= UFC Fight Night: Song vs. Figueiredo =

Mixed martial arts event in 2026

- The poster for UFC Fight Night: Song vs. Figueiredo
- Promotion: Ultimate Fighting Championship
- Date: May 30, 2026
- Venue: Galaxy Arena
- City: Macau SAR, China
- Attendance: 12,647

Event chronology
| UFC Fight Night: Allen vs. Costa | UFC Fight Night: Song vs. Figueiredo | UFC Fight Night: Muhammad vs. Bonfim |

UFC Fight Night: Song vs. Figueiredo (also known as UFC Fight Night 277) was a mixed martial arts event produced by the Ultimate Fighting Championship that took place on May 30, 2026, at the Galaxy Arena in Macau SAR, China.

== Background ==
The event marked the promotion's fifth visit to Macau and first since UFC Fight Night: Yan vs. Figueiredo in November 2024.

A bantamweight bout between Song Yadong and former two-time UFC Flyweight Champion Deiveson Figueiredo headlined the event.

A women's strawweight bout between Road to UFC Season 3 women's strawweight winner Shi Ming and Puja Tomar was originally scheduled at this event. However, the pairing was pulled in order to serve as the featured bout of the Road to UFC Season 5 opening round event a day earlier.

A featherweight bout between Road to UFC Season 3 featherweight winner Zhu Kangjie and Ramon Taveras was scheduled for the event, but Taveras withdrew for undisclosed reasons and was replaced by promotional newcomer Rodrigo Vera.

A flyweight bout between Road to UFC Season 2 flyweight winner Rei Tsuruya and Jesús Santos Aguilar was scheduled for the event, but Aguilar withdrew due to an injury and was replaced by Luis Gurule, shifting the pairing to a bantamweight contest.

A welterweight bout between Muslim Salikhov and Jake Matthews was scheduled for the event. However, Salikhov withdrew for undisclosed reasons and was replaced by Carlston Harris.

== Results ==
Main card (Paramount+)
| Weight class | | | | Method | Round | Time | Notes |
|---|---|---|---|---|---|---|---|
| Bantamweight | Song Yadong | def. | Deiveson Figueiredo | Submission (guillotine choke) | 2 | 4:42 |
| Light Heavyweight | Alonzo Menifield | def. | Zhang Mingyang | TKO (punches) | 1 | 4:15 |
| Heavyweight | Sergei Pavlovich | def. | Tallison Teixeira | KO (punches) | 1 | 0:39 |
| Bantamweight | Kai Asakura | def. | Cameron Smotherman | KO (punch) | 1 | 1:50 |
| Welterweight | Jake Matthews | def. | Carlston Harris | Decision (unanimous) (30–25, 30–27, 30–27) | 3 | 5:00 |
| Flyweight | Alex Perez | vs. | Su Mudaerji | NC (accidental groin kick) | 2 | 1:45 | (Note: Accidental groin kick rendered Perez unable to continue.) |
Preliminary card (Paramount+)
| Middleweight | Luis Felipe Dias | def. | Lee Yi-sak | TKO (punches) | 1 | 3:40 |
| Welterweight | José Henrique Souza | def. | Ding Meng | Decision (split) (30–27, 28–29, 29–28) | 3 | 5:00 |
| Bantamweight | Cody Haddon | def. | Aori Qileng | TKO (knees to the body and punches) | 2 | 2:11 |
| Bantamweight | Rei Tsuruya | def. | Luis Gurule | Submission (neck crank) | 1 | 3:19 |
| Women's Strawweight | Angela Hill | def. | Xiong Jingnan | Decision (unanimous) (30–27, 30–27, 30–27) | 3 | 5:00 |
| Featherweight | Rodrigo Vera | def. | Zhu Kangjie | KO (punches) | 1 | 1:50 |
| Women's Strawweight | Jaqueline Amorim | def. | Loma Lookboonmee | Submission (armbar) | 1 | 4:04 |

== Bonus awards ==
The following fighters received $100,000 bonuses. The other finishes received $25,000 additional bonuses.

- Fight of the Night: Alonzo Menifield vs. Zhang Mingyang
- Performance of the Night: Song Yadong and Kai Asakura

== See also ==
- 2026 in UFC
- List of current UFC fighters
- List of UFC events
