= Road to UFC Season 5 =

Mixed martial arts competition

Information
- Promotion: Ultimate Fighting Championship
- First date aired: May 28, 2026

Road to UFC Season 5 is the 2026 cycle of Road to UFC, a mixed martial arts (MMA) event series in which top Asian MMA prospects compete to win contracts with the Ultimate Fighting Championship (UFC).

== Background ==
The event series featured four divisions—women's strawweight, flyweight, bantamweight, and featherweight—each for which eight fighters compete in a "win-and-advance" tournament format. The tournament winner of each division is awarded a UFC contract. Each event within the series contains five bouts, one of which is a non-tournament match-up.

The quarterfinal stage of the tournament took place over two days on May 28-29, 2026, at the Galaxy Arena in Macau, China, with total of 10 bouts events per day.

The Road to UFC Season 4 flyweight final between Namsrai Batbayar and Yin Shuai took place on May 29, 2026. Yin Shuai, who originally lost to Aaron Tau in the semifinals, was added to the final after Tau missed weight for the February 2026 event tied to UFC 325. Tau's weight miss resulted in his removal from the bout and his subsequent release, allowing Yin to step in as the replacement finalist.

Two UFC bouts took place as well: a lightweight bout between Rong Zhu and Victor Martinez, and a women's strawweight bout between Road to UFC Season 3 women's strawweight winner Shi Ming and Puja Tomar.

The finals are scheduled to take place on February 7, 2027 at UFC Fight Night 298 in Sydney, Australia.

== Road to UFC: Opening Round – Day 1 ==
Road to UFC: Opening Round – Day 1
- Promotion: Road to UFC
- Date: May 28, 2026
- Venue: Galaxy Arena
- City: Macau SAR, China

=== Background ===
A bantamweight bout between Rabindra Dhant and Matty Iann was scheduled for the event. However, Iann withdrew due to a knee injury and was replaced by Kimbert Alintozon.

A bantamweight bout between Ryuho Miyaguchi and Shin You-min was scheduled for the event. However, You-min withdrew due to a knee injury and was replaced by Chungreng Koren.

At the weigh-ins, Victor Martinez weighed in at 158 pounds, two pounds over the weight non-title fight limit. The bout proceeded at catchweight and it is unclear what percent of his purse went to his opponent Road to UFC Season 2 lightweight tournament winner Rong Zhu.

=== Results ===
Fight card (UFC Fight Pass)
Weight class				Method	Round	Time	Notes
Catchweight (158 lb)	Rong Zhu	def.	Victor Martinez	TKO (punches)	1	1:10	(Note: Martinez missed weight (158 lb).)
Featherweight	Xie Bin	def.	Yudi Cahyadi	TKO (punches)	1	2:05
Featherweight	George Mangos	def.	Yuito Yanagawa	KO (knee to the body)	1	3:19	(Note: Road to UFC Season 5 Featherweight Tournament Quarterfinal.)
Featherweight	Ahejiang Ailinuer	def.	Lim Gwan-woo	Decision (unanimous) (30–27, 30–27, 30–27)	3	5:00	(Note: Road to UFC Season 5 Featherweight Tournament Quarterfinal.)
Bantamweight	Kasib Murdoch	def.	Yunosuke Minami	Submission (arm-triangle choke)	3	3:46	(Note: Road to UFC Season 5 Bantamweight Tournament Quarterfinal.)
Featherweight	Dagiisuren Chagnaadorj	def.	Regezhen	Decision (split) (29–28, 28–29, 29–28)	3	5:00	(Note: Road to UFC Season 5 Featherweight Tournament Quarterfinal.)
Bantamweight	Rabindra Dhant	def.	Kimbert Alintozon	TKO (punches)	2	4:37	(Note: Road to UFC Season 5 Bantamweight Tournament Quarterfinal.)
Bantamweight	Ryo Tajima	def.	Ti Haitao	Decision (split) (29–28, 28–29, 29–28)	3	5:00	(Note: Road to UFC Season 5 Bantamweight Tournament Quarterfinal.)
Featherweight	Song Young-jae	def.	Jin Aoi	Submission (rear-naked choke)	2	3:39	(Note: Road to UFC Season 5 Featherweight Tournament Quarterfinal.)
Bantamweight	Chungreng Koren	def.	Ryuho Miyaguchi	Submission (rear-naked choke)	2	4:00	(Note: Road to UFC Season 5 Bantamweight Tournament Quarterfinal; Koren missed weight (139.5 lb).)

== Road to UFC: Opening Round – Day 2 ==
Road to UFC: Opening Round – Day 2
- Promotion: Road to UFC
- Date: May 29, 2026
- Venue: Galaxy Arena
- City: Macau SAR, China

=== Results ===
Fight card (UFC Fight Pass)
Weight class				Method	Round	Time	Notes
Women's Strawweight	Shi Ming	def.	Puja Tomar	Submission (arm-triangle choke)	1	3:12
Flyweight	Namsrai Batbayar	def.	Yin Shuai	TKO (knee and punches)	1	1:48	(Note: Road to UFC Season 4 Flyweight Tournament Final.)
Flyweight	Ji Niushiyue	def.	Kaito Oda	Decision (unanimous) (30–27, 30–27, 29–28)	3	5:00	(Note: Road to UFC Season 5 Flyweight Tournament Quarterfinal.)
Women's Strawweight	Farida Abdueva	def.	Feng Xiaocan	TKO (punch)	1	2:02	(Note: Road to UFC Season 5 Women's Strawweight Tournament Quarterfinal.)
Flyweight	Joseph Larcinese	def.	Ryoga Arimoto	Decision (split) (29–28, 28–29, 29–28)	3	5:00	(Note: Road to UFC Season 5 Flyweight Tournament Quarterfinal.)
Women's Strawweight	Meng Bo	def.	Arisa Matsuda	Decision (unanimous) (30–27, 30–27, 30–27)	3	5:00	(Note: Road to UFC Season 5 Women's Strawweight Tournament Quarterfinal.)
Flyweight	Takaya Suzuki	def.	Otgonbaatar Boldbaatar	TKO (punches)	1	4:36	(Note: Road to UFC Season 5 Flyweight Tournament Quarterfinal.)
Women's Strawweight	Park Bo-hyun	def.	Dong Huaxiang	Decision (split) (28–29, 29–28, 29–28)	3	5:00	(Note: Road to UFC Season 5 Women's Strawweight Tournament Quarterfinal.)
Flyweight	Takeru Uchida	def.	Eros Baluyot	Submission (rear-naked choke)	1	1:18	(Note: Road to UFC Season 5 Flyweight Tournament Quarterfinal.)
Women's Strawweight	Machi Fukuda	def.	Anelya Toktogonova	TKO (punches)	2	1:53	(Note: Road to UFC Season 5 Women's Strawweight Tournament Quarterfinal.)

== Road to UFC: Semifinals ==
Road to UFC: Semifinals
- Promotion: Road to UFC
- Date: August 28, 2026
- Venue: SPD Bank Oriental Sports Center
- City: Shanghai, China

=== Background ===
At the weigh-ins, Takeru Uchida weighed in at 128.5 pounds, 2.5 pounds over the flyweight limit. As a result, the semifinal bout with Ji Niushiyue has been cancelled and Ji advances to the finale.

=== Results ===
Fight card (UFC Fight Pass)
Weight class				Method	Round	Time	Notes
Lightweight	Maheshate Hayisaer	def.	Darrius Flowers	Submission (guillotine choke)	1	2:31
Middleweight	Yilizhati Maimaitijiang	vs.	Tre'ston Vines	Draw (split) (29–28, 28–29, 28–28)	3	5:00
Featherweight	George Mangos	def.	Ahejiang Ailinuer	Submission (rear-naked choke)	2	2:03	(Note: Road to UFC Season 5 Featherweight Tournament Semifinal.)
Bantamweight	Rabindra Dhant	def.	Kasib Murdoch	Decision (split) (29–28, 28–29, 29–28)	3	5:00	(Note: Road to UFC Season 5 Bantamweight Tournament Semifinal.)
Women's Strawweight	Meng Bo	def.	Machi Fukuda	Decision (split) (30–27, 28–29, 29–28)	3	5:00	(Note: Road to UFC Season 5 Women's Strawweight Tournament Semifinal.)
Flyweight	Takaya Suzuki	def.	Joseph Larcinese	TKO (body kick and punches)	3	0:15	(Note: Road to UFC Season 5 Flyweight Tournament Semifinal.)
Featherweight	Dagiisuren Chagnaadorj	def.	Song Young-jae	Submission (rear-naked choke)	1	2:51	(Note: Road to UFC Season 5 Featherweight Tournament Semifinal.)
Bantamweight	Ryo Tajima	def.	Chungreng Koren	Decision (unanimous) (30–27, 29–28, 29–28)	3	5:00	(Note: Road to UFC Season 5 Bantamweight Tournament Semifinal.)
Women's Strawweight	Park Bo-hyun	def.	Farida Abdueva	Decision (unanimous) (29–28, 29–28, 29–28)	3	5:00	(Note: Road to UFC Season 5 Women's Strawweight Tournament Semifinal.)

== Tournament brackets ==
=== Featherweight ===
Quarter-finals
(Australia) George Mangos	KO
(Japan) Yuito Yanagawa	1
(China) Ahejiang Ailinuer	UD
(South Korea) Lim Gwan-woo	3
(China) Regezhen	3
(Mongolia) Dagiisuren Chagnaadorj	SD
(Japan) Jin Aoi	2
(South Korea) Song Young-jae	SUB

Semi-finals
(Australia) George Mangos	SUB
(China) Ahejiang Ailinuer	2
(Mongolia) Dagiisuren Chagnaadorj	SUB
(South Korea) Song Young-jae	1

Final
(Australia) George Mangos
(Mongolia) Dagiisuren Chagnaadorj

=== Bantamweight ===
Quarter-finals
(Japan) Yunosuke Minami	3
(New Zealand) Kasib Murdoch	SUB
(Nepal) Rabindra Dhant	TKO
(Philippines) Kimbert Alintozon (Note: Rabindra's opponent, Matty Iann, was replaced by Kimbert Alintozon due to a knee injury.)	2
(China) Ti Haitao	3
(Japan) Ryo Tajima	SD
(Japan) Ryuho Miyaguchi	2
(India) Chungreng Koren (Note: Miyaguchi's opponent, Shin You-min, was replaced by Chungreng Koren due to a knee injury.)	SUB

Semi-finals
(New Zealand) Kasib Murdoch	3
(Nepal) Rabindra Dhant	SD
(Japan) Ryo Tajima	UD
(India) Chungreng Koren	3

Final
(Nepal) Rabindra Dhant
(Japan) Ryo Tajima

=== Flyweight ===
Quarter-finals
(China) Ji Niushiyue	UD
(Japan) Kaito Oda	3
(Philippines) Eros Baluyot	1
(Japan) Takeru Uchida	SUB
(Japan) Takaya Suzuki	TKO
(Mongolia) Otgonbaatar Boldbaatar	1
(Japan) Ryoga Arimoto	3
(Australia) Joseph Larcinese	SD

Semi-finals
(China) Ji Niushiyue	BYE (Note: Takeru Uchida weighed in at 128.5 pounds, above the flyweight limit by 2.5 pounds. As a result, this bout has been canceled and Ji Niushiyue advances to the finale.)
(Japan) Takeru Uchida	–
(Japan) Takaya Suzuki	TKO
(Australia) Joseph Larcinese	3

Final
(China) Ji Niushiyue
(Japan) Takaya Suzuki

=== Women's Strawweight ===
Quarter-finals
(China) Dong Huaxiang	3
(South Korea) Park Bo-hyun	SD
(Kyrgyzstan) Farida Abdueva	TKO (Note: Originally ruled a no contest due to eye poke, however upon review the punch that paused the action was legal and the bout has been ruled a TKO.)
(China) Feng Xiaocan	1
(China) Meng Bo	UD
(Japan) Arisa Matsuda	3
(Japan) Machi Fukuda	TKO
(Kyrgyzstan) Anelya Toktogonova	2

Semi-finals
(South Korea) Park Bo-hyun	UD
(Kyrgyzstan) Farida Abdueva	3
(China) Meng Bo	SD
(Japan) Machi Fukuda	3

Final
(South Korea) Park Bo-hyun
(China) Meng Bo

== See also ==
- Ultimate Fighting Championship
- Road to UFC
