= UFC Fight Night: Salkilld vs. Saint Denis =

Mixed martial arts event in 2027

- Promotion: Ultimate Fighting Championship
- Date: February 7, 2027
- Venue: Afterpay Arena
- City: Sydney, Australia

Event chronology
UFC 336: Van vs. Kape	UFC Fight Night: Salkilld vs. Saint Denis	UFC Fight Night: Pyfer vs. Nickal

UFC Fight Night: Salkilld vs. Saint Denis (also known as UFC Fight Night 298) is an upcoming mixed martial arts event produced by the Ultimate Fighting Championship that is scheduled to take place on February 7, 2027, at the Afterpay Arena in Sydney, Australia.

== Background ==
The event will mark the promotion's ninth visit to Sydney, first since UFC 325 in February 2026, and first Fight Night event since UFC Fight Night: Werdum vs. Tybura in November 2017.

A lightweight bout between Quillan Salkilld and Benoît Saint Denis is scheduled to headline the event.

The Road to UFC Season 5 finals are scheduled to take place at the event.

== Fight card ==
Main card (Paramount+)
Weight class				Method	Round	Time	Notes
Lightweight	Quillan Salkilld	vs.	Benoît Saint Denis
Light Heavyweight	Bogdan Guskov	vs.	Robert Whittaker
Welterweight	Jonathan Micallef	vs.	Sam Patterson
Featherweight	Marwan Rahiki	vs.	Yoo Joo-sang
Featherweight	Kaan Ofli	vs.	Joanderson Brito

== Announced bouts ==
- Road to UFC Season 5 Featherweight final: George Mangos vs. Dagiisuren Chagnaadorj
- Road to UFC Season 5 Bantamweight final: Rabindra Dhant vs. Ryo Tajima
- Road to UFC Season 5 Flyweight final: Ji Niushiyue vs. Takaya Suzuki
- Road to UFC Season 5 Women's Strawweight final: Park Bo-hyun vs. Meng Bo

== See also ==
- 2027 in UFC
- List of current UFC fighters
- List of UFC events
- Mixed martial arts in Australia
