= Tuco Tokkos =

British mixed martial artist (born 1990)

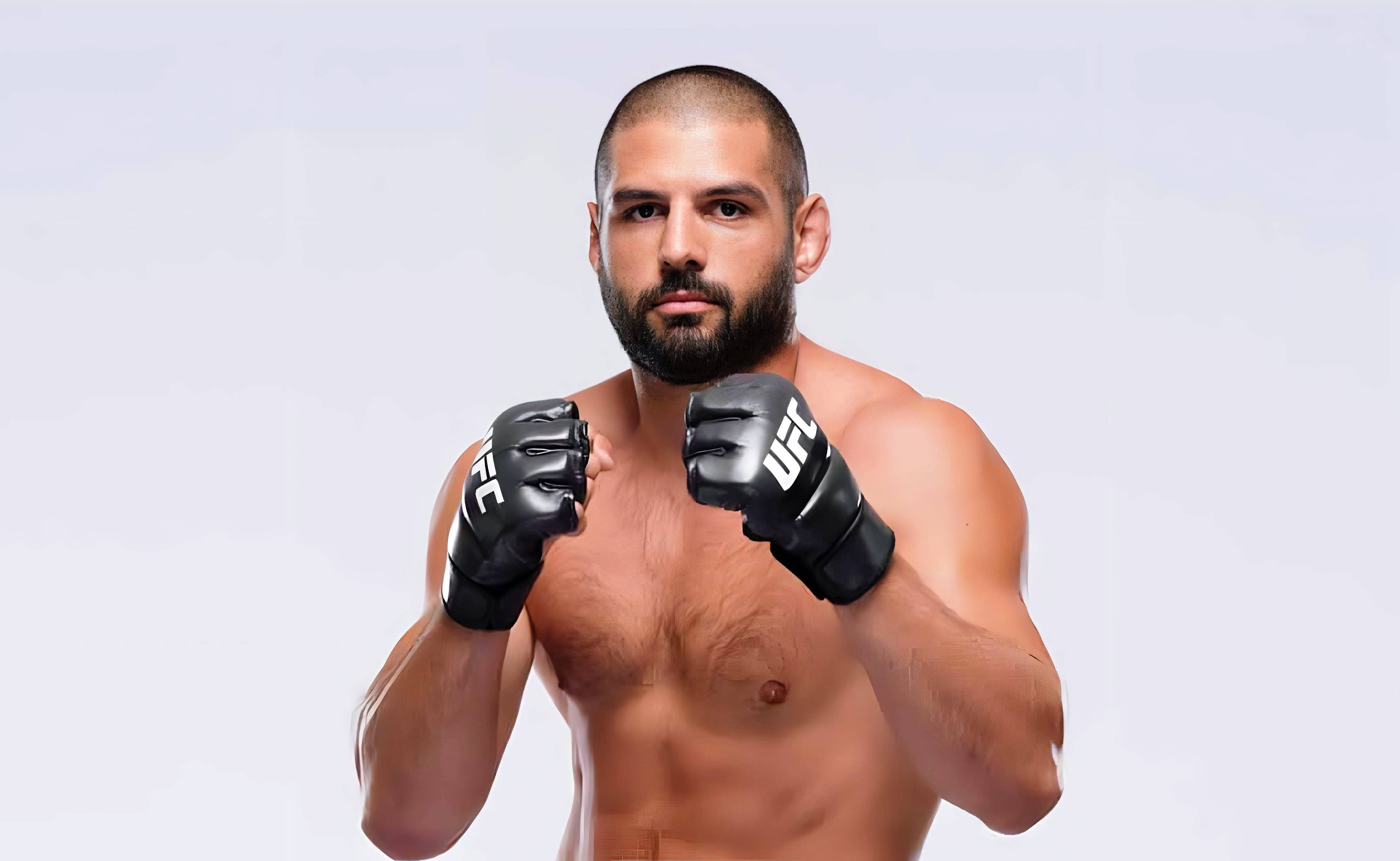
- Tokkos in 2025
- Born: George Tokkos; June 30, 1990 (age 36); London, England
- Other names: Tuco
- Height: 6 ft 4 in (1.93 m)
- Weight: 205 lb (93 kg; 14 st 9 lb)
- Division: Middleweight; Light Heavyweight
- Reach: 76 in (193 cm)
- Fighting out of: Deerfield Beach, Florida, U.S.
- Team: Kill Cliff FC
- Years active: 2017–present

Mixed martial arts record
- Total: 17
- Wins: 11
- By knockout: 6
- By submission: 3
- By decision: 2
- Losses: 6
- By knockout: 2
- By submission: 1
- By decision: 3

Other information
- Mixed martial arts record from Sherdog

George Tokkos (born 30 June 1990), also known as Tuco Tokkos, is a British professional mixed martial artist who competed in the Light heavyweight division of the Ultimate Fighting Championship (UFC).

== Background ==
George Tokkos was born on 30 June 1990 in Camden, London. He is of mixed heritage, with a Brazilian mother and a Greek Cypriot father. His nickname "Tuco" is a from the classic western 'The Good, the Bad and the Ugly'. Tokkos spent his early days in North West London before relocating to Deerfield Beach, Florida to join Kill Cliff FC camp under Henri Hooft.

== Mixed martial arts career ==
=== Early career ===
Tokkos made his professional debut on 9 September 2017 at UCMMA 52, where he defeated Benjamin Veverita via unanimous decision. He spent his early career primarily on the European circuits, including a stint in Bellator MMA, where he faced Kevin Fryer and Ty Gwerder. He moved to the United States in 2018 to compete for Fury FC and secured first-round TKO victories over Ty Flores and Myron Dennis.

=== Road to UFC ===
On 9 June 2022, Tokkos participated in the Road to UFC tournament in Singapore. He faced Zhang Mingyang in a light heavyweight bout but lost via first-round knockout. His performance on the regional circuit led to a formal UFC contract in 2024.

=== Ultimate Fighting Championship ===
Tokkos made his debut against Oumar Sy on 18 May 2024 at UFC Fight Night 241, losing via first-round submission. He then faced Navajo Stirling on 14 December 2024 at UFC on ESPN 63, and lost via unanimous decision.

On 12 July 2025, Tokkos faced Junior Tafa at UFC on ESPN 70, securing his first UFC victory by submitting Tafa with an arm-triangle choke in the second round.

Tokkos faced Ivan Erslan on 16 May 2026 at UFC Fight Night 276. He lost the fight by unanimous decision.

On 22 May 2026, it was reported that Tokkos was removed from the UFC roster.

== Personal life ==
Tokkos is a Brazilian Jiu-Jitsu black belt under Daniel Gracie. He has a close relationship with Brendan Allen.

== Mixed martial arts record ==
Professional record breakdown
17 matches	11 wins	6 losses
By knockout	6	2
By submission	3	1
By decision	2	3

Res.	Record	Opponent	Method	Event	Date	Round	Time	Location	Notes
Loss	11–6	Ivan Erslan	Decision (unanimous)	UFC Fight Night: Allen vs. Costa	May 16, 2026	3	5:00	Las Vegas, Nevada, United States	
Win	11–5	Junior Tafa	Submission (arm-triangle choke)	UFC on ESPN: Lewis vs. Teixeira	July 12, 2025	2	4:25	Nashville, Tennessee, United States	
Loss	10–5	Navajo Stirling	Decision (unanimous)	UFC on ESPN: Covington vs. Buckley	December 14, 2024	3	5:00	Tampa, Florida, United States	
Loss	10–4	Oumar Sy	Submission (face crank)	UFC Fight Night: Barboza vs. Murphy	May 18, 2024	1	3:43	Las Vegas, Nevada, United States	
Win	10–3	Myron Dennis	TKO (arm injury)	Fury FC 86	February 23, 2024	1	1:29	Dallas, Texas, United States	
Win	9–3	Brian Jackson	TKO (punches)	All In Combat 3	August 19, 2023	1	0:40	Mandeville, Louisiana, United States	
Win	8–3	Gabriel Thimoteo	Decision (unanimous)	Shooto Brasil 116	March 17, 2023	3	5:00	Rio de Janeiro, Brazil	
Loss	7–3	Zhang Mingyang	KO (punches)	Road to UFC Season 1: Episode 1	June 9, 2022	1	3:57	Kallang, Singapore	
Win	7–2	Ty Flores	TKO (punches)	Fury FC 59	March 27, 2022	1	4:39	Humble, Texas, United States	Won the vacant Fury FC Light Heavyweight Championship.
Win	6–2	Clayton York	Submission (brabo choke)	Fury FC 53	November 14, 2021	1	3:53	Houston, Texas, United States	
Win	5–2	Yu Ji	Submission (arm-triangle choke)	Premier FC 31	September 18, 2021	4	3:31	Springfield, Massachusetts, United States	Return to Light Heavyweight. Won the vacant Premier FC Light Heavyweight Championship.
Loss	4–2	Ty Gwerder	TKO (punches)	Bellator 246	September 12, 2020	3	1:05	Uncasville, Connecticut, United States	
Loss	4–1	Kevin Fryer	Decision (unanimous)	Bellator London 2	November 23, 2019	3	5:00	London, England	Middleweight debut.
Win	4–0	Feng Shun	TKO (punches)	The Big Fight UK: England vs. China	April 29, 2018	2	2:33	London, England	Catchweight (190 lb) bout.
Win	3–0	Mike Garrett	TKO (punches)	Ultimate Challenge MMA 54	February 10, 2018	1	2:58	London, England	
Win	2–0	Aaron Jones	TKO (punches)	Ultimate Challenge MMA 53	November 11, 2017	1	1:07	London, England	
Win	1–0	Benjamin Veverita	Decision (unanimous)	Ultimate Challenge MMA 52	September 9, 2017	3	5:00	London, England	Light Heavyweight debut.

== See also ==
- List of male mixed martial artists
