= Zhang Mingyang =

Chinese mixed martial artist (born 1998)

- Born: August 16, 1998 (age 28); Fuyang, Anhui, China
- Native name: 张名扬
- Other names: Mountain Tiger
- Height: 6 ft 2 in (1.88 m)
- Weight: 205 lb (93 kg; 14 st 9 lb)
- Division: Light heavyweight Heavyweight; Middleweight
- Reach: 75 in (191 cm)
- Style: Sanda
- Fighting out of: Qingdao, Shandong, China
- Team: Sunkin Fight; Xtreme Couture Mixed Martial Arts
- Rank: Blue belt in Brazilian Jiu-Jitsu
- Years active: 2014–present

Mixed martial arts record
- Total: 27
- Wins: 19
- By knockout: 13
- By submission: 6
- Losses: 8
- By knockout: 5
- By submission: 2
- By decision: 1

Amateur record
- Total: 1
- Wins: 1

Other information
- University: Shandong Sport University
- Children: 1
- Mixed martial arts record from Sherdog

Zhang Mingyang (Chinese: 张名扬; born August 16, 1998) is a Chinese mixed martial artist who currently competes in the Light heavyweight division of the Ultimate Fighting Championship (UFC).

== Background ==
Zhang was born in Taihe County in Fuyang city of Anhui province in 1998. The nickname 'Mountain Tiger' was given to him by his father since he was born in the year of the Tiger and also because his father hoped he would become brave like one.

When Zhang was seven, he met his uncle who finished his training Shaolin Monastery and trained Zhang in martial arts. At age twelve, Zhang's parents sent Zhang to the Shaolin Monastery to train after a strong request from him. He then started practicing sanda becoming the Henan Province Youth Sanda Champion and the National Youth Sanda Champion at the age of thirteen.

At age fourteen, Zhang was selected to become a member of the Shanxi Provincial Sanda Team.

While on the Sanda team, Zhang accidentally saw a UFC video on the internet. After seeing it, he decided to switch to MMA with the goal of entering the UFC. Despite his family's dissuasion, he left his hometown to move to Qingdao in Shandong province. He joined Sunkin Fight which is a subsidiary of Sunkin Group, a real estate company.

== Mixed martial arts career ==
=== Early career ===
In 2014 at age sixteen, Zhang started his MMA career where he fought in the Chinese regional scene.

Zhang represented China in the 2018 Junior World Cup held in St. Petersburg, Russia that was hosted by the Russian MMA Union and the World Mixed Martial Arts Association. He won the gold medal in the 93 kg class.

=== Ultimate Fighting Championship ===
On June 9, 2022, Zhang fought Tuco Tokkos as the opening to Road to UFC Season 1. Despite Tokkos being a betting favorite, Zhang knocked him out via punches in the first round. This victory made Zhang the first Chinese fighter to win a UFC contract in the Road to UFC program.

In 2023, Zhang was originally scheduled to face Tyson Pedro at UFC 284. However Zhang had to withdraw due to a significant waist injury that kept him away from fighting for over a year.

Zhang was originally scheduled to make his UFC debut against Brendson Ribeiro at UFC Fight Night 233. However, the bout was postponed due to the event's change of location and visa issues, and was rescheduled for UFC 298 on February 17, 2024. Zhang won the fight via knockout in the first round. This fight earned his first Performance of the Night award.

On November 23, 2024, Zhang faced Ozzy Diaz at UFC Fight Night 248. He won via TKO in the first round via an elbow strike at distance. This fight earned him another Performance of the Night award.

On April 26, 2025, Zhang faced Anthony Smith for his retirement fight at UFC on ESPN 66. He won via TKO in the first round via elbows. This fight earned him another Performance of the Night award.

Zhang faced Johnny Walker on August 23, 2025 in the main event at UFC Fight Night 257. He lost the fight by technical knockout via leg kicks and punches in the second round.

Zhang faced Alonzo Menifield on May 30, 2026 at UFC Fight Night 277. He lost the fight by technical knockout in the first round. This fight earned him a $100,000 Fight of the Night award.

== Personal life ==
Zhang is married. His wife was previously a dancer who participated on the CMG New Year's Gala.

Zhang has one son. Zhang was not able to witness the birth of his child as he was in training camp at the time.

== Championships and accomplishments ==
=== Mixed martial arts ===
- Ultimate Fighting Championship
  - Fight of the Night (One time) vs. Alonzo Menifield
  - Performance of the Night (Three Times) vs. Brendson Ribeiro, Ozzy Diaz and Anthony Smith
  - UFC.com Awards
    - 2024: Ranked #6 Newcomer of the Year
- Wu Lin Feng
  - 2021 WLF Heavyweight Tournament winner
- MMA Fighting
  - 2024 Second Team MMA All-Star

=== Sanda ===
- 2012 Henan Youth Sanda Championship − 1st place
- 2012 National Youth Sanda Championship − 1st place

== Mixed martial arts record ==
Professional record breakdown
27 matches	19 wins	8 losses
By knockout	13	5
By submission	6	2
By decision	0	1

Res.	Record	Opponent	Method	Event	Date	Round	Time	Location	Notes
Loss	19–8	Alonzo Menifield	TKO (punches)	UFC Fight Night: Song vs. Figueiredo	May 30, 2026	1	4:15	Macau SAR, China	Fight of the Night.
Loss	19–7	Johnny Walker	TKO (leg kicks and punches)	UFC Fight Night: Walker vs. Zhang	August 23, 2025	2	2:37	Shanghai, China	
Win	19–6	Anthony Smith	TKO (elbows)	UFC on ESPN: Machado Garry vs. Prates	April 26, 2025	1	4:03	Kansas City, Missouri, United States	Performance of the Night.
Win	18–6	Ozzy Diaz	TKO (elbow and punches)	UFC Fight Night: Yan vs. Figueiredo	November 23, 2024	1	2:25	Macau SAR, China	Performance of the Night.
Win	17–6	Brendson Ribeiro	KO (punches)	UFC 298	February 17, 2024	1	1:41	Anaheim, California, United States	Performance of the Night.
Win	16–6	Tuco Tokkos	KO (punches)	Road to UFC Season 1: Episode 1	June 19, 2022	1	3:57	Kallang, Singapore	Return to Light Heavyweight.
Win	15–6	Huo Changsheng	TKO (punches)	WLF W.A.R.S. 52	April 30, 2021	1	2:25	Maotai, China	
Win	14–6	Zhang Caibao	TKO (punches)	WLF W.A.R.S. 50	January 14, 2021	1	1:29	Zhengzhou, China	Won the WLF Heavyweight Tournament.
Win	13–6	Kong Handong	TKO (knees and punches)	WLF W.A.R.S. 50	January 14, 2021	1	0:45	Zhengzhou, China	WLF Heavyweight Tournament Semifinal.
Win	12–6	Zhang Caibao	TKO (punches)	WLF W.A.R.S. 49	November 17, 2020	1	1:29	Zhengzhou, China	
Win	11–6	Tian Hongyan	TKO (punches)	Huya FC: Kung Fu Carnival Season 2	September 5, 2020	1	0:50	Guangzhou, China	Won the Huya FC Heavyweight Grand Prix.
Win	10–6	Ma Anding	Submission (rear-naked choke)	Huya FC: Kung Fu Carnival Season 2	September 5, 2020	1	2:09	Guangzhou, China	Huya FC Heavyweight Grand Prix Semifinal.
Win	9–6	Huo Changsheng	TKO (punches)	Huya FC: Kung Fu Carnival Season 2	September 5, 2020	1	2:01	Guangzhou, China	Return to Heavyweight. Huya FC Heavyweight Grand Prix Quarterfinal.
Win	8–6	Alireza Vafaei	Submission (rear-naked choke)	WLF W.A.R.S. 41	January 3, 2020	1	1:53	Zhengzhou, China	
Loss	7–6	Luan Aguirre Elias	Submission (rear-naked choke)	WLF W.A.R.S. 39	July 18, 2019	1	3:36	Zhengzhou, China	
Win	7–5	Nosherwan Khanzada	TKO (punches)	WLF W.A.R.S. 36	July 12, 2019	1	3:26	Zhengzhou, China	Heavyweight bout.
Win	6–5	Nader Ishakov	TKO (punches)	Tatfight 9: China vs. Tatarstan	April 27, 2019	1	1:00	Kazan, Russia	
Loss	5–5	Askar Mozharov	KO (punch)	YunFeng Duel	December 29, 2018	1	N/A	Yantai, China	
Loss	5–4	Sergey Pogodaev	TKO (punches)	MFP 220	May 26, 2018	2	3:45	Khabarovsk, Russia	Light Heavyweight debut.
Win	5–3	Aorigele	Submission (rear-naked choke)	Fight King: Gold Belt Contest	January 28, 2018	1	1:35	Xian'an, China	Heavyweight debut.
Win	4–3	Sayama	Submission (armbar)	YunFeng Showdown 8	December 23, 2017	1	1:53	Yantai, China	Catchweight (198 lb) bout.
Loss	3–3	Koji Shikuwa	Decision (unanimous)	Kunlun Fight MMA 11	May 4, 2017	3	5:00	Jining, China	
Loss	3–2	John Vake	KO (punches)	Kunlun Fight: Cage Fight Series 6	October 21, 2016	1	2:18	Yiwu, China	Catchweight (190 lb) bout.
Win	3–1	Puriya Nemati	Submission (rear-naked choke)	CKF 08/13	August 13, 2016	1	1:11	Qingdao, China	Catchweight (190 lb) bout.
Win	2–1	Atta Izzatullo	TKO (punches)	WBK 16: Day 2	June 26, 2016	1	2:10	Qingdao, China	Middleweight debut.
Win	1–1	Zhang Caibao	Submission (rear-naked choke)	2016 Xinjiang Oriental Summit	January 21, 2016	1	1:55	Qingdao, China	Catchweight (198 lb) bout.
Loss	0–1	Han Qingtao	Submission (guillotine choke)	CKF 12/30	December 30, 2014	2	0:15	Qian'an, China	Catchweight (202 lb) bout.

== See also ==
- List of current UFC fighters
- List of male mixed martial artists
