= Road to UFC =

American reality series and MMA competition

Road to UFC is a recurring mixed martial arts (MMA) event series in which top Asian MMA prospects compete to win contracts with the Ultimate Fighting Championship (UFC).

== Overview ==
Structured into "seasons" and "episodes," it features a number of fighter weight divisions—each for which fighters compete in a "win-and-advance" tournament format. Each event in the series, or "episode," features one bout for each division tournament, and one non-tournament bout. The opening quarterfinal round is typically held hosting four events over a two-day span, with two episodes for each day. The semifinal round is held a few months later. Each season culminates with the tournament finals, which take place during preliminary card of a UFC Fight Night event. The tournament winner for each division is awarded a UFC contract.

The "Road to UFC" branding was previously used in 2015 for Road to UFC: Japan, a similar Japan-based tournament awarding a UFC contract, but formatted as a reality competition, and marketed as an Asian-centric analog to The Ultimate Fighter. Despite the reuse of the "Road to UFC" brand, similar Asian MMA focus, and season/episode nomenclature, the UFC has not characterized the newer event series as inclusive of the earlier 2015 reality competition, and has described the 2022 tournament cycle as the "inaugural tournament," referring to it as "Season 1".

== Seasons ==
Name	Start Date	End Date	Venue	Location	Ref.
Season 5	May 28, 2026	Feb 7, 2027	Galaxy Arena	Macau, China	
Season 5	May 28, 2026	Feb 7, 2027	Afterpay Arena	Sydney, Australia	
Season 4	May 22, 2025	Feb 1, 2026	UFC Performance Institute Shanghai	Shanghai, China	
Season 4	May 22, 2025	Feb 1, 2026	Shanghai Indoor Stadium	Shanghai, China	
Season 4	May 22, 2025	Feb 1, 2026	Qudos Bank Arena	Sydney, Australia	
Season 3	May 18, 2024	May 23, 2025	UFC Performance Institute Shanghai	Shanghai, China	
Season 3	May 18, 2024	May 23, 2025	UFC Apex	Las Vegas, Nevada, U.S.	
Season 2	May 27, 2023	June 22, 2024	UFC Performance Institute Shanghai	Shanghai, China	
Season 2	May 27, 2023	June 22, 2024	Singapore Indoor Stadium	Kallang, Singapore	
Season 2	May 27, 2023	June 22, 2024	UFC Apex	Las Vegas, Nevada, U.S.	
Season 2	May 27, 2023	June 22, 2024	Kingdom Arena	Riyadh, Saudi Arabia	
Season 1	June 8, 2022	February 4, 2023	Singapore Indoor Stadium	Kallang, Singapore	
Season 1	June 8, 2022	February 4, 2023	Etihad Arena	Abu Dhabi, United Arab Emirates	
Season 1	June 8, 2022	February 4, 2023	UFC Apex	Las Vegas, Nevada, U.S.	

== Tournament winners ==
Name	Finale	Division	Winner	Runner-up
Road to UFC Season 1	Feb 4, 2023	Lightweight	(India) Anshul Jubli	(Indonesia) Jeka Saragih
Road to UFC Season 1	Feb 4, 2023	Featherweight	(South Korea) Lee Jeong-yeong	(China) Yi Zha
Road to UFC Season 1	Feb 4, 2023	Bantamweight	(Japan) Rinya Nakamura	(Japan) Toshiomi Kazama
Road to UFC Season 1	Feb 4, 2023	Flyweight	(South Korea) Park Hyun-sung	(South Korea) Choi Seung-guk
Road to UFC Season 2	Feb 3, 2024	Lightweight	(China) Rong Zhu	(Japan) Shin Haraguchi
Road to UFC Season 2	Feb 3, 2024	Featherweight	(China) Yi Zha	(China) Li Kaiwen
Road to UFC Season 2	Feb 3, 2024	Flyweight	(Japan) Rei Tsuruya	(China) Ji Niushiyue
Road to UFC Season 2	Jun 22, 2024	Bantamweight	(South Korea) Lee Chang-ho	(China) Xiao Long
Road to UFC Season 3	Nov 23, 2024	Bantamweight	(South Korea) You Su-young	(China) Baergeng Jieleyisi
Road to UFC Season 3	Nov 23, 2024	Flyweight	(South Korea) Choi Dong-hun	(England) Kiru Singh Sahota
Road to UFC Season 3	Nov 23, 2024	Women's Strawweight	(China) Shi Ming	(China) Feng Xiaocan
Road to UFC Season 3	May 23, 2025	Featherweight	(China) Zhu Kangjie	(China) Xie Bin
Road to UFC Season 4	Feb 1, 2026	Bantamweight	(New Zealand) Lawrence Lui	(China) Sulang Rangbo
Road to UFC Season 4	Feb 1, 2026	Featherweight	(Japan) Keiichiro Nakamura	(Australia) Sebastian Szalay
Road to UFC Season 4	Feb 1, 2026	Lightweight	(Australia) Dom Mar Fan	(South Korea) Kim Sang-wook
Road to UFC Season 4	May 29, 2026	Flyweight	(Mongolia) Namsrai Batbayar	(China) Yin Shuai
Road to UFC Season 5		Women's Strawweight		
Road to UFC Season 5		Flyweight		
Road to UFC Season 5		Bantamweight		
Road to UFC Season 5		Featherweight		
