= Rabindra Dhant =

Nepalese mixed martial artist (born 1998)

- Born: 30 November 1998 (age 27); Bajhang, Nepal
- Nickname: The Tiger of Bajhang
- Nationality: Nepalese
- Height: 5 ft 9 in (175 cm)
- Weight: 135.5 lb (61.46 kg; 9 st 9.5 lb)
- Division: Bantamweight
- Style: Mixed martial arts
- Stance: Orthodox
- Fighting out of: Kathmandu, Nepal
- Team: Lock N Roll MMA (2022-active); Soma Fight Club (2024-active)
- Years active: 2021–present

Mixed martial arts record
- Total: 12
- Wins: 11
- By knockout: 8
- By submission: 1
- By decision: 2
- Losses: 1
- By knockout: 0
- By submission: 0
- By decision: 1

Other information
- Occupation: Mixed martial artist
- Mixed martial arts record from Sherdog

Rabindra Dhant (Note: Nepali: रविन्द्र ढाँट) (born 30 November 1998) is a Nepalese professional mixed martial artist. He became the first Nepali to win a title in a professional MMA promotion after claiming the Matrix Fight Night (MFN) bantamweight championship by defeating Chungreng Koren at MFN 17 in August 2025. He subsequently made history again in 2026, becoming the first Nepalese fighter to advance in Road to UFC by defeating Kimbert Alintozon in the quarterfinals of Season 5. In the semifinals, Dhant faced New Zealand's Kasib Murdoch and defeated him via split decision, advancing to the tournament final.

Dhant currently competes in the bantamweight division and is known for his striking ability and background in karate and Brazilian jiu-jitsu.

== Early life and background ==
Dhant was born in Bitthadchir Rural Municipality of Bajhang District in far-western Nepal. He completed his schooling up to Grade 10 at a local school in his village. At the age of 16, he migrated to Pithoragarh, India, in search of employment and worked there as a manual laborer. In an interview on On Air, he stated that his "back bones had come out" due to excessive manual labour, earning about $1.6 for 8 hours of work per day. He later moved to New Delhi, where he held jobs in small offices, primarily performing cleaning and tea-serving duties.

While in Delhi, Dhant began training in karate, attending sessions early in the morning before work. Encouraged by a local coach, he eventually transitioned to mixed martial arts, despite initially having limited exposure to the sport.

== MFN 17 and title achievement ==
On 2 August 2025, Dhant competed at MFN 17 held in Greater Noida, India. He faced Chungreng Koren, an Indian fighter known as The Indian Rhino, who held a record of 7–1. Dhant entered the bout with an 8–1 record and secured a victory in the third round via knockout. With this win, he became the first Nepali athlete to claim a championship title in the MFN promotion.

== Recognition and impact ==
Following his MFN title win, Dhant received widespread recognition from the Nepali public, media outlets, and political leaders. Despite beginning his career without institutional support, his victory has been hailed as a milestone for combat sports in Nepal. Due to his origin and aggressive fighting style, he is often referred to as Bajhang ko Bagh (The Tiger of Bajhang).

Dhant made his Road to UFC debut in Season 5 at the Galaxy Arena in Macau. He was originally scheduled to face Matty Iann on 28 May 2026, during Episode 1 of the tournament. However, Iann withdrew due to a knee injury and was replaced by Kimbert Alintozon. Dhant won the bout via technical knockout (TKO) in the second round, securing his advancement to semi-finals in the tournament. In the semifinals, Dhant faced New Zealand's Kasib Murdoch and defeated him by split decision, advancing to the tournament final.

Dhant is scheduled to face Ryo Tajima in the Road to UFC Season 5 finals on 7 February 2027 at UFC Fight Night 298.

== Mixed martial arts record ==
Professional record breakdown
12 matches	11 wins	1 loss
By knockout	8	0
By submission	1	0
By decision	2	1

Res.	Record	Opponent	Method	Event	Date	Round	Time	Location	Notes
Win	11–1	Kasib Murdoch	Decision (split)	Road to UFC Season 5: Semifinals	28 August 2026	3	5:00	Shanghai, China	Road to UFC Season 5 Bantamweight Tournament Semifinal.
Win	10–1	Kimbert Alintozon	TKO (punches)	Road to UFC Season 5: Opening Round – Day 1	28 May 2026	2	4:37	Macau SAR, China	Road to UFC Season 5 Bantamweight Tournament Quarterfinal.
Win	9–1	Chungreng Koren	KO (punches)	Matrix Fight Night 17	2 August 2025	3	0:54	Greater Noida, India	Won the MFN Bantamweight Championship.
Win	8–1	Eqiyuebu	TKO (punches)	Brave CF 93	18 April 2025	1	2:56	Zhengzhou, China	
Win	7–1	Korey Sutcliffe	Decision (unanimous)	Nepal Warriors: Fight Night 3	25 May 2024	3	5:00	Kathmandu, Nepal	
Loss	6–1	Ismail Khan	Decision (unanimous)	ONE Friday Fights 45	15 December 2023	3	5:00	Bangkok, Thailand	
Win	6–0	Torepchi Dongak	TKO (punches)	ONE Friday Fights 33	15 September 2023	3	1:55	Bangkok, Thailand	Return to Bantamweight.
Win	5–0	Jason Lyngdoh	Submission (rear-naked choke)	Nepal Warriors: Fight Night 1	16 June 2023	1	1:23	Kathmandu, Nepal	
Win	4–0	Ravi Saw	TKO (punches)	Goa Combat 2022	20 October 2022	2	3:24	Taleigão, India	
Win	3–0	Krishna Payasi	TKO (punches)	Fight of Knights 3	22 May 2022	2	2:02	Nimach, India	Featherweight debut.
Win	2–0	Rohit Pundeer	TKO (punches)	Ultimate Fighting League 3	15 December 2019	1	4:00	Rampur Bushahr, India	Flyweight debut.
Win	1–0	Padeep Singh	TKO (punches)	Hosharafu FC 32	5 May 2019	2	1:04	New Delhi, India	Bantamweight debut.

== See also ==
- List of male mixed martial artists
