= Deiveson Figueiredo =

Brazilian mixed martial artist (born 1987)

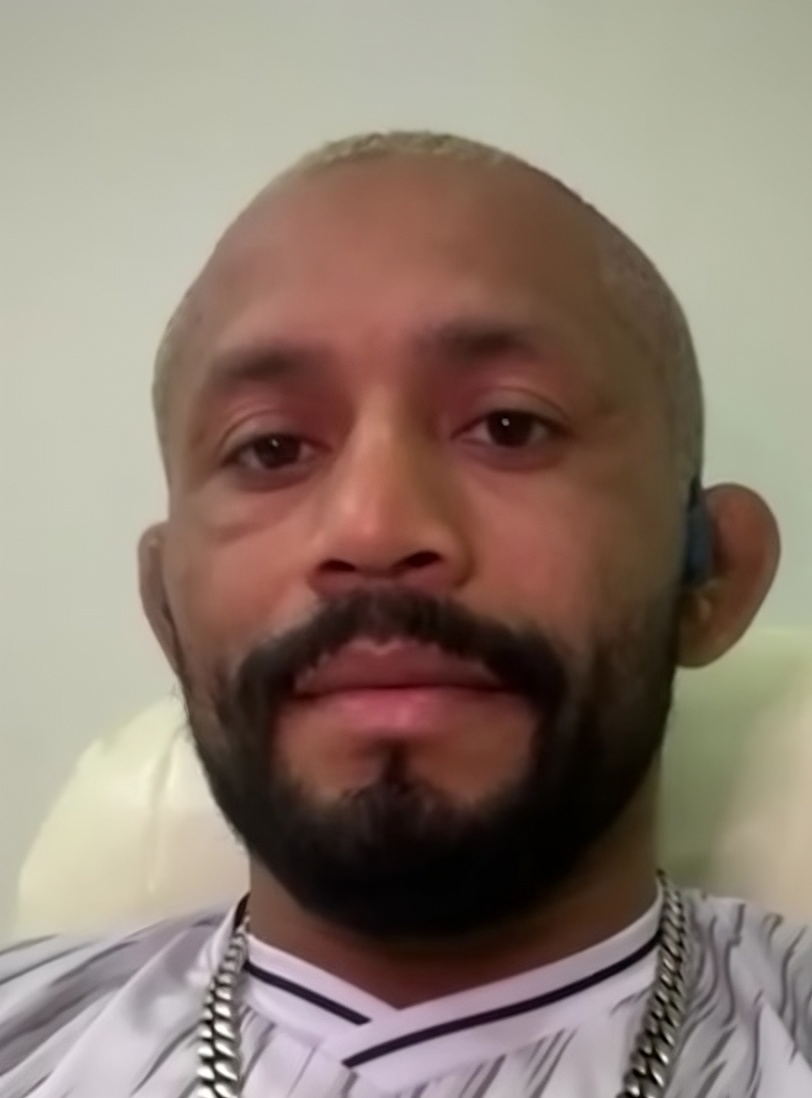
- Figueiredo in 2024
- Born: Deiveson Alcântara Figueiredo; December 18, 1987 (age 38); Soure, Pará, Brazil
- Other names: Daico; Deus Da Guerra (God of War)
- Height: 5 ft 5 in (1.65 m)
- Weight: 135 lb (61 kg; 9 st 9 lb)
- Division: Flyweight (2012–2023); Bantamweight (2023–present)
- Reach: 68 in (173 cm)
- Fighting out of: Soure, Pará, Brazil
- Team: Team Alpha Male (2018–2019); Team Figueiredo (2019–2021); Fight Ready (2021–present); Chute Boxe Diego Lima (2022)
- Rank: Black belt in Brazilian Jiu-Jitsu
- Years active: 2012–present

Mixed martial arts record
- Total: 34
- Wins: 25
- By knockout: 9
- By submission: 9
- By decision: 7
- Losses: 8
- By knockout: 3
- By submission: 2
- By decision: 3
- Draws: 1

Other information
- Notable relatives: Francisco Figueiredo
- Mixed martial arts record from Sherdog

Deiveson Alcântara Figueiredo (born December 18, 1987) is a Brazilian professional mixed martial artist. He currently competes in the Bantamweight division of the Ultimate Fighting Championship (UFC). He has also competed in the Flyweight division, where he is a former two-time UFC Flyweight Champion. He is considered one of the greatest Flyweights of all time, where his Flyweight record stands at 10 wins, 3 losses, and 1 draw.

== Background ==
Figueiredo was born in Soure, Pará, Brazil, a small city on the isle of Marajó. His father was a buffalo herder who practiced luta marajoara, a local folk wrestling style. Deiveson has a younger sister and a brother – Francisco – who also is a professional mixed martial artist who was signed with the UFC. He was a cowboy, working with his father at an animal farm until he was thirteen years old. Around the age of nine, he followed his father's footsteps and began wrestling. He moved to Belém to attend high school and started training in capoeira. He started training MMA under the tutelage of UFC Bantamweight Iuri "Marajó" Alcântara at the age of sixteen.

== Mixed martial arts career ==
=== Early career ===
Figueiredo made his professional debut in February 2012 against a fellow debutante Aluisio Ferreira. He won the fight by first-round submission. In his next six fights, Figueiredo fought in the Pará and Maranhão MMA circuits, mostly against debuting fighters, with David Silva and Joel Silva being the notable exceptions.

In late 2014, Deiveson signed with Jungle Fight, and was scheduled to make his first appearance with the organization at Jungle Fight 75 against Rayner Silva. Figueiredo won the fight by a second-round TKO.

He was then scheduled to fight Jefte Brilhante during Revelation FC 3, but the bout was later cancelled. He was scheduled to fight Henrique Souza during Revelation FC 4, but the fight was likewise later cancelled.

Figueiredo was scheduled to fight Antônio de Miranda during Jungle Fight 87, following a seventeen-month break from the sport. He defeated de Miranda by submission mid-way through the first round. He fought again four months later, during Jungle Fight 90, against the undefeated Denis Araujo Oliveira. He defeated Araujo by a second-round TKO.

=== Ultimate Fighting Championship ===
Figueiredo made his promotional debut on June 3, 2017, at UFC 212, facing Marco Beltran. He won the fight via technical knockout by corner stoppage after round two.

His next fight came on October 28, 2017, at UFC Fight Night: Brunson vs. Machida against Jarred Brooks. He won the fight via split decision.

On February 3, 2018, Figueiredo faced Joseph Morales at UFC Fight Night: Machida vs. Anders. He won the fight via technical knockout in round two.

Figueiredo faced John Moraga on August 25, 2018, at UFC Fight Night 135. He won the fight via technical knockout 3:08 into the second round.

Figueiredo was expected to face Joseph Benavidez on January 19, 2019, at UFC Fight Night 143. However the promotion clarified plans indicating that the pairing was off and that Figueiredo would be rescheduled for a separate event.

Figueiredo faced Jussier Formiga on March 23, 2019, at UFC Fight Night 148. He lost the fight via unanimous decision, thus resulting in Figueiredo's first professional loss.

Figueiredo faced Alexandre Pantoja on July 27, 2019, at UFC 240. He won the fight via unanimous decision. This fight earned him the Fight of the Night award.

Figueiredo faced Tim Elliott on October 12, 2019, at UFC Fight Night 161. He won the fight via submission in the first round.

==== UFC Flyweight Champion ====
Figueiredo faced Joseph Benavidez for the vacant UFC Flyweight Championship at UFC Fight Night 169 on February 29, 2020. At the weigh-in, Figueiredo weighed in at 127.5 pounds, 2.5 pounds over the title fight limit. As a result, Figueiredo forfeited 30 percent of his purse to Benavidez and wasn't eligible to win the UFC Flyweight championship. He won the fight via TKO in round two.

Figueiredo rematched with Joseph Benavidez for the vacant UFC Flyweight Championship at UFC Fight Night 172 on July 19, 2020. On July 11, 2020, Figueiredo tested positive for COVID-19. According to his manager, the bout was not yet officially removed and Figueiredo was administered a second COVID-19 test on July 12, 2020, where the result would be back on July 13, 2020, to determined if Figueiredo was free to fight. Figueiredo passed multiple COVID-19 tests, clearing him to fight in the main event. Figueiredo won the fight via a technical submission in the first round. This win earned him the Performance of the Night award.

As the first fight of his new six-fight contract with the UFC, Figueiredo was scheduled to make his first title defense against former UFC Bantamweight champion Cody Garbrandt on November 21, 2020, at UFC 255. However, it was reported on October 2, 2020, that Garbrandt had torn his bicep and was forced to pull out of the contest. Figueiredo instead made his first title defense against Alex Perez. He won the fight via guillotine choke submission in round one.

After a successful defence of his title at UFC 255, Figueiredo faced Brandon Moreno at UFC 256. This was the UFC's fastest championship turnaround, at 21 days. After five rounds of back–and–forth fighting, the fight was declared a majority draw. Figueiredo had a point taken from him by referee Jason Herzog in the third round for a low blow: the foul proved crucial as it turned two 48–47 scorecards in his favor into even 47–47 decisions, with the third judge seeing the fight 48-46 for the champion. 13 out of 27 media outlets scored the bout for Figueiredo while 14 out of the 27 outlets scored the bout as a draw. Both men won the Fight of the Night award.

==== Title loss and second reign ====
Figueiredo then faced Moreno in a rematch on June 12, 2021, at UFC 263. He lost the bout and the title via a rear-naked choke submission in round three.

A trilogy bout with Moreno for the UFC Flyweight Championship was scheduled on December 11, 2021, at UFC 269 initially, but it was moved to UFC 270. Figueiredo trained with Henry Cejudo at Fight Ready to prepare for the fight. After knocking Moreno down multiple times, he won the bout via unanimous decision, becoming a two time UFC Flyweight champion in the process. This fight earned him the Fight of the Night award.

The tetralogy bout between Figueiredo and Brandon Moreno took place on January 21, 2023, at UFC 283. He lost the bout and title via technical knockout before the fourth round after the ringside doctor stopped the fight due to Figueiredo's eye swelling shut.

==== Post-championship and move to Bantamweight ====
Figueiredo was scheduled to face Manel Kape on July 8, 2023, at UFC 290. However, Figueiredo withdrew after he was not medically cleared to compete and the bout was scrapped.

In his first bout in the bantamweight division, Figueiredo faced Rob Font on December 2, 2023, at UFC on ESPN 52. He won the fight via unanimous decision.

Figueiredo faced former UFC Bantamweight Champion Cody Garbrandt on April 13, 2024, at UFC 300. He won the fight by rear-naked choke submission in the second round.

Figueiredo faced former UFC Bantamweight Championship challenger Marlon Vera on August 3, 2024, at UFC on ABC 7. He won the fight by unanimous decision, becoming the first fighter to score a recorded knockdown of Vera in the UFC.

Figueiredo faced former UFC Bantamweight Champion Petr Yan on November 23, 2024 in the main event at UFC Fight Night 248. He lost the fight by unanimous decision.

Figueiredo faced former interim UFC Bantamweight Championship challenger Cory Sandhagen in the main event on May 3, 2025 at UFC on ESPN 67. He lost the fight by technical knockout in the second round after suffering a knee injury.

Figueiredo faced Montel Jackson on October 11, 2025, at UFC Fight Night 261. He won the fight by split decision.

Figueiredo faced former UFC Bantamweight Championship challenger Umar Nurmagomedov on January 24, 2026 at UFC 324. Figueiredo weighed in at 138.5 pounds, two and a half pounds over the bantamweight non‑title limit. As a result, the bout proceeded at catchweight, and Figueiredo was fined 25 percent of his purse, which was awarded to Nurmagomedov. He lost the fight via unanimous decision.

Figueiredo faced Song Yadong on May 30, 2026 at UFC Fight Night 277. He lost the fight via a guillotine choke submission at the end of the second round.

Figueiredo faced Payton Talbott on October 3, 2026, at UFC 332. He lost the fight by technical knockout in the first round.

== Submission grappling career ==
Figueiredo faced Raul Rosas Jr. in a submission grappling match at Hype FC Brazil: Sao Paulo on April 8, 2026. The bout ended in a draw.

== Personal life ==
Figueiredo worked as a farmer, bricklayer, hairdresser, taxi driver and sushi chef before competing in MMA professionally.

He is a fan of Brazilian football teams Botafogo and Paysandu.

Following a stint at Team Alpha Male, Deiveson returned to his native Brazil and founded Team Figueiredo gym in Belém.

== Championships and accomplishments ==
=== Mixed martial arts ===
- Ultimate Fighting Championship
  - UFC Flyweight Championship (Two times)
    - Two successful title defenses (first reign)
    - The fastest title-fight turnaround in UFC history (21 days in 2020)
    - Tied (Brandon Moreno) for third most title fight wins in UFC Flyweight division history (3)
  - Fight of the Night (Three times) vs. Alexandre Pantoja and Brandon Moreno 1 & 3
  - Performance of the Night (One time) vs. Joseph Benavidez
  - Tied (Demetrious Johnson) for second most finishes in UFC Flyweight division history (7) (behind Alexandre Pantoja)
  - Fastest submission in UFC Flyweight division history (1:57) (vs. Alex Perez)
  - Most knockdowns landed in UFC Flyweight division history (11)
  - Most submission attempts in UFC Flyweight division history (20)
  - Sixth most wins in UFC Flyweight division history (10)
  - Tied (Tatsuro Taira & Kyoji Horiguchi) for the sixth longest win streak in UFC Flyweight division history (5)
  - Tied (John Lineker, Dustin Ortiz, Alex Perez & Joshua Van) for third most knockouts in UFC Flyweight division history (4)
  - Shortest span between a trilogy in UFC history (406 days)
  - First trilogy in UFC history consisting of both fighters' three consecutive bouts
  - UFC Honors Awards
    - 2020: President's Choice Fight of the Year Nominee vs. Brandon Moreno 1
  - UFC.com Awards
    - 2020: Fighter of the Year, Ranked #2 Fight of the Year vs. Brandon Moreno 1 & Ranked #9 Submission of the Year vs. Joseph Benavidez 2
    - 2022: Ranked #6 Fight of the Year vs. Brandon Moreno 3
- MMA Junkie
  - 2019 July Fight of the Month vs. Alexandre Pantoja
  - 2020 December Fight of the Month vs. Brandon Moreno
  - 2022 January Fight of the Month vs. Brandon Moreno
- MMA Mania
  - 2020 Fight of the Year vs. Brandon Moreno
  - 2020 Fighter of the Year
- ESPN
  - 2020 Male Fighter of the Year
- The Athletic
  - 2020 Fighter of the Year
- MMA Fighting
  - 2020 Fighter of the Year
  - 2024 Second Team MMA All-Star
- Combat Press
  - 2020 Male Fighter of the Year
- Sherdog
  - 2020 Fighter of the Year
- The Body Lock MMA
  - 2020 Male Fighter of the Year
- World MMA Awards
  - 2021 Fight of the Year vs. Brandon Moreno at UFC 256
- Bleacher Report
  - 2020 Fighter of the Year
- Bloody Elbow
  - 2020 Fighter of the Year
- Fight Matrix
  - 2020 Male Fighter of the Year
- CBS Sports
  - 2020 UFC Fighter of the Year
  - 2020 #2 Ranked UFC Fight of the Year vs. Brandon Moreno
- MMA Weekly
  - 2020 Fighter of the Year
  - 2020 Submission of the Year vs. Joseph Benavidez at UFC Fight Night: Figueiredo vs. Benavidez 2
- LowKick MMA
  - 2020 Fighter of the Year
- MMA Sucka
  - 2020 Fighter of the Year

=== Grappling ===
- Brazilian jiu-jitsu
  - Brazilian Jiu-jitsu Northeast Brazil champion

== Mixed martial arts record ==
Professional record breakdown
34 matches	25 wins	8 losses
By knockout	9	3
By submission	9	2
By decision	7	3
Draws	1	

Res.	Record	Opponent	Method	Event	Date	Round	Time	Location	Notes
Loss	25–8–1	Payton Talbott	TKO (punches)	UFC 332	October 3, 2026	1	2:09	Salt Lake City, Utah, United States	
Loss	25–7–1	Song Yadong	Submission (guillotine choke)	UFC Fight Night: Song vs. Figueiredo	May 30, 2026	2	4:42	Macau SAR, China	
Loss	25–6–1	Umar Nurmagomedov	Decision (unanimous)	UFC 324	January 24, 2026	3	5:00	Las Vegas, Nevada, United States	Catchweight (138.5 lb) bout; Figueiredo missed weight.
Win	25–5–1	Montel Jackson	Decision (split)	UFC Fight Night: Oliveira vs. Gamrot	October 11, 2025	3	5:00	Rio de Janeiro, Brazil	
Loss	24–5–1	Cory Sandhagen	TKO (knee injury)	UFC on ESPN: Sandhagen vs. Figueiredo	May 3, 2025	2	4:08	Des Moines, Iowa, United States	
Loss	24–4–1	Petr Yan	Decision (unanimous)	UFC Fight Night: Yan vs. Figueiredo	November 23, 2024	5	5:00	Macau SAR, China	
Win	24–3–1	Marlon Vera	Decision (unanimous)	UFC on ABC: Sandhagen vs. Nurmagomedov	August 3, 2024	3	5:00	Abu Dhabi, United Arab Emirates	
Win	23–3–1	Cody Garbrandt	Submission (rear-naked choke)	UFC 300	April 13, 2024	2	4:02	Las Vegas, Nevada, United States	
Win	22–3–1	Rob Font	Decision (unanimous)	UFC on ESPN: Dariush vs. Tsarukyan	December 2, 2023	3	5:00	Austin, Texas, United States	Bantamweight debut.
Loss	21–3–1	Brandon Moreno	TKO (doctor stoppage)	UFC 283	January 21, 2023	3	5:00	Rio de Janeiro, Brazil	Lost the UFC Flyweight Championship.
Win	21–2–1	Brandon Moreno	Decision (unanimous)	UFC 270	January 22, 2022	5	5:00	Anaheim, California, United States	Won the UFC Flyweight Championship. Fight of the Night.
Loss	20–2–1	Brandon Moreno	Submission (rear-naked choke)	UFC 263	June 12, 2021	3	2:26	Glendale, Arizona, United States	Lost the UFC Flyweight Championship.
Draw	20–1–1	Brandon Moreno	Draw (majority)	UFC 256	December 12, 2020	5	5:00	Las Vegas, Nevada, United States	Retained the UFC Flyweight Championship. Figueiredo was deducted one point in round 3 due to a groin strike. Fight of the Night.
Win	20–1	Alex Perez	Submission (guillotine choke)	UFC 255	November 21, 2020	1	1:57	Las Vegas, Nevada, United States	Defended the UFC Flyweight Championship.
Win	19–1	Joseph Benavidez	Technical Submission (rear-naked choke)	UFC Fight Night: Figueiredo vs. Benavidez 2	July 19, 2020	1	4:48	Abu Dhabi, United Arab Emirates	Won the vacant UFC Flyweight Championship. Performance of the Night.
Win	18–1	Joseph Benavidez	TKO (punches)	UFC Fight Night: Benavidez vs. Figueiredo	February 29, 2020	2	1:54	Norfolk, Virginia, United States	For the vacant UFC Flyweight Championship. Figueiredo missed weight (127.5 lb) and became ineligible to win the title.
Win	17–1	Tim Elliott	Submission (guillotine choke)	UFC Fight Night: Joanna vs. Waterson	October 12, 2019	1	3:08	Tampa, Florida, United States	
Win	16–1	Alexandre Pantoja	Decision (unanimous)	UFC 240	July 27, 2019	3	5:00	Edmonton, Alberta, Canada	Fight of the Night.
Loss	15–1	Jussier Formiga	Decision (unanimous)	UFC Fight Night: Thompson vs. Pettis	March 23, 2019	3	5:00	Nashville, Tennessee, United States	
Win	15–0	John Moraga	TKO (punches)	UFC Fight Night: Gaethje vs. Vick	August 25, 2018	2	3:08	Lincoln, Nebraska, United States	
Win	14–0	Joseph Morales	TKO (punches)	UFC Fight Night: Machida vs. Anders	February 3, 2018	2	4:34	Belém, Brazil	
Win	13–0	Jarred Brooks	Decision (split)	UFC Fight Night: Brunson vs. Machida	October 28, 2017	3	5:00	São Paulo, Brazil	
Win	12–0	Marco Beltrán	TKO (corner stoppage)	UFC 212	June 3, 2017	2	5:00	Rio de Janeiro, Brazil	
Win	11–0	Ricardo do Socorro	Submission (arm-triangle choke)	Salvaterra Marajó Fight 5	December 1, 2016	1	1:20	Salvaterra, Brazil	
Win	10–0	Denis Oliveira Fontes Araujo	KO (punches)	Jungle Fight 90	September 3, 2016	2	2:56	São Paulo, Brazil	
Win	9–0	Antônio de Miranda	Submission (guillotine choke)	Jungle Fight 87	May 21, 2016	1	2:55	São Paulo, Brazil	
Win	8–0	Rayner Silva	TKO (punches)	Jungle Fight 75	December 18, 2014	2	3:20	Belém, Brazil	
Win	7–0	João Neto Silva	TKO (punches)	Coalizão Fight 4	November 13, 2014	1	2:18	Benevides, Brazil	
Win	6–0	Joel Silva	KO (punches)	Coalizão Fight 2	August 7, 2014	1	3:30	Belém, Brazil	
Win	5–0	Edvaldo Junior	Submission (guillotine choke)	Jurunense Open Fight MMA 7	July 3, 2014	1	4:55	Belém, Brazil	
Win	4–0	Adailton Pereira	Decision (unanimous)	Lago da Pedra Fight	May 1, 2014	3	5:00	Lago da Pedra, Brazil	
Win	3–0	David Raimundo Silva	Submission (guillotine choke)	Jurunense Open Fight MMA 6	March 20, 2014	1	0:53	Belém, Brazil	
Win	2–0	Jonas Ferreira	TKO (punches)	Amazon Fight 18	August 11, 2012	1	2:04	Santa Isabel do Pará, Brazil	
Win	1–0	Aluisio Ferreira	Submission (armbar)	Knock Out Combat Icoaraci 3	February 17, 2012	1	3:02	Belém, Brazil	

== Pay-per-view bouts ==
No	Event	Fight	Date	Venue	City	PPV buys
1.	UFC 255	Figueiredo vs. Perez	November 21, 2020	UFC Apex	Enterprise, Nevada, United States	Not Disclosed
2.	UFC 256	Figueiredo vs. Moreno	December 12, 2020	UFC Apex	Enterprise, Nevada, United States	Not Disclosed

== See also ==
- List of current UFC fighters
- List of male mixed martial artists

Awards and achievements
Preceded by Henry Cejudo; Vacated	3rd UFC Flyweight Champion; July 19, 2020 – June 21, 2021	Succeeded by Brandon Moreno
Preceded by Brandon Moreno	5th UFC Flyweight Champion; January 22, 2020 – January 21, 2023	Succeeded by Brandon Moreno
