= UFC Fight Night: Walker vs. Zhang =

Mixed martial arts event in 2025

- The poster for UFC Fight Night: Walker vs. Zhang
- Promotion: Ultimate Fighting Championship
- Date: August 23, 2025
- Venue: Shanghai Indoor Stadium
- City: Shanghai, China
- Attendance: Not announced

Event chronology
UFC 319: du Plessis vs. Chimaev	UFC Fight Night: Walker vs. Zhang	UFC Fight Night: Imavov vs. Borralho

UFC Fight Night: Walker vs. Zhang (also known as UFC Fight Night 257 and UFC on ESPN+ 115) was a mixed martial arts event produced by the Ultimate Fighting Championship that took place on August 23, 2025, at the Shanghai Indoor Stadium in Shanghai, China.

== Background ==
The event marked the promotion's second visit to Shanghai and first since UFC Fight Night: Bisping vs. Gastelum in November 2017. It was also the first time since the COVID-19 pandemic that the UFC has returned to Mainland China. The promotion was originally expected to make their return to the location at UFC Fight Night: Song vs. Gutiérrez in December 2023, before moving that event to Las Vegas due to undisclosed reasons.

A light heavyweight bout between Johnny Walker and Zhang Mingyang headlined this event.

A catchweight bout between former UFC Featherweight Championship challenger Brian Ortega and former UFC Bantamweight Champion Aljamain Sterling took place in a five round co-headliner. Originally slated as a featherweight bout, it was changed to a catchweight of 153 pounds after reports that Ortega had complications during his weight cut.

Shi Ming and Bruna Brasil were expected to meet in a women's strawweight bout at the event. However, the pairing was pulled in order to serve as the featured bout of the Road to UFC Season 4 semifinals event a day earlier.

A welterweight bout between Song Kenan and Kiefer Crosbie was scheduled for this event. However, Song withdrew from the fight for unknown reasons and was replaced by promotional newcomer Taiyilake Nueraji.

In addition, a middleweight bout between Michel Pereira and Marco Tulio was also scheduled for this event. However, Tulio withdrew from the fight for unknown reasons and was replaced by returning veteran Kyle Daukaus.

== Results ==
Main card (ESPN+)
Weight class				Method	Round	Time	Notes
Light Heavyweight	Johnny Walker	def.	Zhang Mingyang	TKO (leg kicks and punches)	2	2:37
Catchweight (153 lb)	Aljamain Sterling	def.	Brian Ortega	Decision (unanimous) (50–45, 50–45, 50–45)	5	5:00
Heavyweight	Sergei Pavlovich	def.	Waldo Cortes-Acosta	Decision (unanimous) (30–27, 29–28, 29–28)	3	5:00
Flyweight	Su Mudaerji	def.	Kevin Borjas	Decision (unanimous) (30–27, 30–27, 30–27)	3	5:00
Welterweight	Taiyilake Nueraji	def.	Kiefer Crosbie	TKO (elbows)	1	3:33	(Note: Nueraji was deducted two points in round 1 due to an illegal knee.)
Preliminary card (ESPN+)
Lightweight	Gauge Young	def.	Maheshate Hayisaer	Decision (unanimous) (30–27, 29–28, 29–28)	3	5:00
Flyweight	Charles Johnson	def.	Lone'er Kavanagh	KO (punch)	2	4:35
Lightweight	Rong Zhu	def.	Austin Hubbard	Decision (unanimous) (30–27, 29–28, 29–28)	3	5:00
Middleweight	Kyle Daukaus	def.	Michel Pereira	KO (punches and elbows)	1	0:43
Featherweight	Yi Zha	def.	Westin Wilson	KO (punches)	1	0:37
Bantamweight	You Su-young	def.	Xiao Long	Decision (unanimous) (29–28, 29–28, 29–28)	3	5:00
Light Heavyweight	Uran Satybaldiev	def.	Diyar Nurgozhay	Submission (Ezekiel choke)	1	2:45

== Bonus awards ==
The following fighters received $50,000 bonuses.

- Fight of the Night: No bonus awarded.
- Performance of the Night: Johnny Walker, Charles Johnson, Kyle Daukaus, and Uran Satybaldiev

== See also ==
- 2025 in UFC
- List of current UFC fighters
- List of UFC events
