= Quillan Salkilld =

Australian mixed martial artist (born 1999)

- Born: Quillan Zane Salkilld; 28 December 1999 (age 26); Pinjarra, Western Australia, Australia
- Height: 6 ft 0 in (183 cm)
- Weight: 155 lb (70 kg; 11 st 1 lb)
- Division: Lightweight
- Reach: 75 in (191 cm)
- Stance: Orthodox
- Fighting out of: Perth, Western Australia, Australia
- Team: Luistro Combat Academy
- Rank: Black belt in Brazilian jiu-jitsu
- Years active: 2021–present

Mixed martial arts record
- Total: 14
- Wins: 13
- By knockout: 5
- By submission: 5
- By decision: 3
- Losses: 1
- By submission: 1

Other information
- Mixed martial arts record from Sherdog

Quillan Zane Salkilld (born 28 December 1999) is an Australian mixed martial artist who currently competes in the Lightweight division of the Ultimate Fighting Championship (UFC). He was featured on Dana White's Contender Series, winning by decision and earning a UFC contract. He previously competed in Eternal MMA, where he was the EMMA Lightweight Champion. As of 10 August 2026, he is #6 in the Meta UFC lightweight rankings.

== Early life ==
Salkilld was born on 28 December 1999, in Pinjarra, Western Australia and raised in Broome. He grew up playing Australian rules football and skateboarding, and has cited Mike Tyson as his favorite combat sports athlete. He began training in mixed martial arts in March 2018.

== Mixed martial arts career ==
=== Amateur career ===
Salkilld began his amateur career with a loss at Eternal MMA 37 and concluded it with a first-round submission victory over Abdalla Biayda at Eternal MMA 53. He also competed at the 2019 GAMMA World Championships. He finished his amateur career with a record of 8–3.

=== Early career ===
After opening his professional career with a loss, Salkilld rebounded with three consecutive victories, all by finish. On 10 June 2023, he captured the Eternal MMA Lightweight Championship by knocking out Blake Donnelly just 41 seconds into the first round. He went on to successfully defend the title twice.

=== Dana White's Contender Series ===
On 3 September 2024, Salkilld faced Gauge Young at Dana White's Contender Series 70. He won the fight by unanimous decision, earning himself a UFC contract.

=== Ultimate Fighting Championship ===
Salkilld made his UFC debut against Anshul Jubli at UFC 312 on 8 February 2025. He won the fight via technical knockout just 19 seconds into the fight. This fight earned him his first Performance of the Night award.

Salkilld faced Yanal Ashmouz at UFC 316 on 7 June 2025. He won the fight by unanimous decision.

Salkilld faced Nasrat Haqparast at UFC 321 on 25 October 2025. He won the fight by knockout in the first round. This fight earned him another Performance of the Night award.

Salkilld was scheduled to face Rongzhu at UFC 325 on 31 January 2026. Rongzhu was forced to withdraw due to a knee injury and was replaced by Jamie Mullarkey. Salkilld submitted Mullarkey in the first round. This fight earned him a $100,000 Performance of the Night award.

Salkilld faced Beneil Dariush on 2 May 2026 at UFC Fight Night 275. He won the fight via technical knockout in the first round. This fight earned him another Performance of the Night award.

Salkilld faced former KSW Featherweight and Lightweight Champion Mateusz Gamrot in his first UFC main event on 8 August 2026 at UFC Fight Night 284. He won the fight via a rear naked choke submission in the first round. This fight earned him his fourth consecutive Performance of the Night award.

Salkilld is scheduled to face Benoît Saint Denis in the main event on 7 February 2027 at UFC Fight Night 298.

== Championships and accomplishments ==
=== Mixed martial arts ===
- Ultimate Fighting Championship
  - Performance of the Night (Five times) vs. Anshul Jubli, Nasrat Haqparast, Jamie Mullarkey, Beneil Dariush and Mateusz Gamrot
  - Second fastest knockout victory by a debuting UFC lightweight (0:19) (vs. Anshul Jubli)
  - UFC Honors Awards
    - 2025: Fan's Choice Debut of the Year Winner vs. Anshul Jubli
  - UFC.com Awards
    - 2025: Newcomer of the Year
    - 2025: Ranked #5 Knockout of the Year vs. Nasrat Haqparast
- Eternal MMA
  - Eternal MMA Lightweight Championship (One time)
    - Two successful title defenses
- CBS Sports
  - 2025 UFC Knockout of the Year vs. Nasrat Haqparast at UFC 321
- Yahoo Sports
  - 2025 #4 Ranked Breakthrough Fighter of the Year
- MMA Junkie
  - 2025 October Knockout of the Month vs. Nasrat Haqparast at UFC 321
  - 2026 January Submission of the Month vs. Jamie Mullarkey at UFC 325

== Mixed martial arts record ==
Professional record breakdown
14 matches	13 wins	1 loss
By knockout	5	0
By submission	5	1
By decision	3	0

Res.	Record	Opponent	Method	Event	Date	Round	Time	Location	Notes
Win	13–1	Mateusz Gamrot	Submission (rear-naked choke)	UFC Fight Night: Gamrot vs. Salkilld	8 August 2026	1	4:25	Las Vegas, Nevada, United States	Performance of the Night.
Win	12–1	Beneil Dariush	TKO (punches)	UFC Fight Night: Della Maddalena vs. Prates	2 May 2026	1	3:29	Perth, Australia	Performance of the Night.
Win	11–1	Jamie Mullarkey	Submission (neck crank)	UFC 325	31 January 2026	1	3:02	Sydney, Australia	Performance of the Night.
Win	10–1	Nasrat Haqparast	KO (head kick)	UFC 321	25 October 2025	1	2:30	Abu Dhabi, United Arab Emirates	Performance of the Night.
Win	9–1	Yanal Ashmouz	Decision (unanimous)	UFC 316	7 June 2025	3	5:00	Newark, New Jersey, United States	
Win	8–1	Anshul Jubli	TKO (punch)	UFC 312	8 February 2025	1	0:19	Sydney, Australia	Performance of the Night.
Win	7–1	Gauge Young	Decision (unanimous)	Dana White's Contender Series 70	3 September 2024	3	5:00	Las Vegas, Nevada, United States	
Win	6–1	Dom Mar Fan	Submission (rear-naked choke)	Eternal MMA 82	10 February 2024	2	3:03	Perth, Australia	Defended the Eternal MMA Lightweight Championship.
Win	5–1	Brett Pastore	Decision (unanimous)	Eternal MMA 80	28 October 2023	5	5:00	Perth, Australia	Defended the Eternal MMA Lightweight Championship.
Win	4–1	Blake Donnelly	KO (punches)	Eternal MMA 76	10 June 2023	1	0:32	Perth, Australia	Won the Eternal MMA Lightweight Championship.
Win	3–1	Niam Stephen	TKO (punches)	Eternal MMA 73	11 February 2023	1	4:01	Perth, Australia	
Win	2–1	Dom Mar Fan	Submission (rear-naked choke)	Eternal MMA 68	20 August 2022	2	2:23	Perth, Australia	
Win	1–1	Nicko Flessas	Submission (guillotine choke)	Eternal MMA 62	30 October 2021	1	2:01	Perth, Australia	
Loss	0–1	Pablo Torrealba	Submission (rear-naked choke)	Eternal MMA 56	13 February 2021	2	3:25	Perth, Australia	Lightweight debut.

== See also ==
- List of current UFC fighters
- List of Dana White's Contender Series alumni
- List of male mixed martial artists
