= Road to UFC Season 4 =

Mixed martial arts competition

Information
- Promotion: Ultimate Fighting Championship
- First date aired: May 22, 2025

Road to UFC Season 4 is the 2025 cycle of Road to UFC, a mixed martial arts (MMA) event series in which top Asian MMA prospects compete to win contracts with the Ultimate Fighting Championship (UFC).

== Background ==
The event series featured four divisions—flyweight, bantamweight, featherweight, and lightweight—each for which eight fighters compete in a "win-and-advance" tournament format. The tournament winner of each division is awarded a UFC contract. Each event within the series contains five bouts, one of which is a non-tournament match-up.

The quarterfinal stage of the tournament took place over two days on May 22-23, 2025, at the UFC Performance Institute Shanghai, with two five-bout events for each day for a total of 10 bouts per day.

The finals (with the exception of the flyweight finals due to Aaron Tau missing weight) took place at on February 1, 2026 at UFC 325 in Sydney, Australia. The flyweight final between Namsrai Batbayar and Yin Shuai is scheduled to take place on May 29, 2026.

== Episode 1 ==
Road to UFC: Episode 1
- Promotion: Road to UFC
- Date: May 22, 2025
- Venue: UFC Performance Institute Shanghai
- City: Shanghai, China

Main Card (UFC Fight Pass)
Weight class				Method	Round	Time	Notes
Featherweight	Sebastian Szalay	def.	Baergeng Jieleyisi	Decision (unanimous) (30–27, 30–27, 29–28)	3	5:00	(Note: Road to UFC Season 4 Featherweight Tournament Quarterfinal.)
Flyweight	Yin Shuai	def.	Kai Yoshida	TKO (punches)	1	4:38	(Note: Road to UFC Season 4 Flyweight Tournament Quarterfinal.)
Featherweight	Keiichiro Nakamura	def.	Park Eoh-jin	KO (knee)	2	2:24	(Note: Road to UFC Season 4 Featherweight Tournament Quarterfinal.)
Flyweight	Namsrai Batbayar	def.	Wataru Yamauchi	KO (punch)	2	0:46	(Note: Road to UFC Season 4 Flyweight Tournament Quarterfinal.)
Women's Strawweight	Arisa Matsuda	def.	Feng Xiaocan	Decision (split) (29–28, 28–29, 29–28)	3	5:00

== Episode 2 ==
Road to UFC: Episode 2
- Promotion: Road to UFC
- Date: May 22, 2025
- Venue: UFC Performance Institute Shanghai
- City: Shanghai, China

Main Card (UFC Fight Pass)
Weight class				Method	Round	Time	Notes
Featherweight	Li Kaiwen	def.	Seo Dong-hyun	TKO (punches)	2	3:21	(Note: Road to UFC Season 4 Featherweight Tournament Quarterfinal.)
Flyweight	Agulali	def.	Mridul Saikia	KO (punch)	1	0:37	(Note: Road to UFC Season 4 Flyweight Tournament Quarterfinal.)
Featherweight	Yoon Chang-min	def.	Jin Aoi	Decision (split) (30–27, 28–29, 30–27)	3	5:00	(Note: Road to UFC Season 4 Featherweight Tournament Quarterfinal.)
Flyweight	Aaron Tau	def.	Rio Tirto	TKO (punches and elbows)	1	1:26	(Note: Road to UFC Season 4 Flyweight Tournament Quarterfinal.)
Lightweight	Mansher Khera	def.	Aziz Khaydarov	Decision (unanimous) (30–26, 29–28, 29–28)	3	5:00

== Episode 3 ==
Road to UFC: Episode 3
- Promotion: Road to UFC
- Date: May 23, 2025
- Venue: UFC Performance Institute Shanghai
- City: Shanghai, China

Main Card (UFC Fight Pass)
Weight class				Method	Round	Time	Notes
Bantamweight	Sulang Langbo	def.	Peter Danesoe	KO (punches)	1	3:48	(Note: Road to UFC Season 4 Bantamweight Tournament Quarterfinal.)
Lightweight	Park Jae-hyun	def.	Jack Becker	TKO (punches and elbows)	2	3:56	(Note: Road to UFC Season 4 Lightweight Tournament Quarterfinal.)
Bantamweight	Sim Kai Xiong	def.	Kuya Ito	Decision (unanimous) (30–27, 30–27, 29–28)	3	5:00	(Note: Road to UFC Season 4 Bantamweight Tournament Quarterfinal.)
Lightweight	Ren Yawei	def.	Deni Daffa	Technical Submission (guillotine choke)	1	2:01	(Note: Road to UFC Season 4 Lightweight Tournament Quarterfinal.)
Welterweight	Kitt Campbell	def.	Shogo Sato	TKO (knee and elbows)	1	0:56

== Episode 4 ==
Road to UFC: Episode 4
- Promotion: Road to UFC
- Date: May 23, 2025
- Venue: UFC Performance Institute Shanghai
- City: Shanghai, China

Main Card (UFC Fight Pass)
Weight class				Method	Round	Time	Notes
Featherweight	Zhu Kangjie	def.	Xie Bin	Decision (split) (30–27, 28–29, 29–28)	3	5:00	(Note: Road to UFC Season 3 Featherweight Tournament Final.)
Lightweight	Dom Mar Fan	def.	Yuji Yannick Ephoeviga	Decision (unanimous) (29–27, 29–27, 29–27)	3	5:00	(Note: Road to UFC Season 4 Lightweight Tournament Quarterfinal.)
Bantamweight	Lawrence Lui	def.	Zhang Qinghe	Decision (unanimous) (29–27, 29–28, 29–28)	3	5:00	(Note: Road to UFC Season 4 Bantamweight Tournament Quarterfinal.)
Lightweight	Kim Sang-wook	def.	Daichi Kamiya	TKO (elbows and punches)	2	3:53	(Note: Road to UFC Season 4 Lightweight Tournament Quarterfinal.)
Bantamweight	Nghiêm Văn Ý	def.	Rui Imura	KO (punches and elbows)	2	4:04	(Note: Road to UFC Season 4 Bantamweight Tournament Quarterfinal.)

== Episode 5 ==
Road to UFC: Episode 5
- Promotion: Road to UFC
- Date: August 22, 2025
- Venue: Shanghai Indoor Stadium
- City: Shanghai, China

Main Card (UFC Fight Pass)
Weight class				Method	Round	Time	Notes
Flyweight	Namsrai Batbayar	def.	Agulali	Submission (rear-naked choke)	1	4:45	(Note: Road to UFC Season 4 Flyweight Tournament Semifinal.)
Featherweight	Sebastian Szalay	def.	Yoon Chang-min	TKO (punches)	1	0:47	(Note: Road to UFC Season 4 Featherweight Tournament Semifinal.)
Bantamweight	Lawrence Lui	def.	Nghiêm Văn Ý	TKO (punches)	2	1:48	(Note: Road to UFC Season 4 Bantamweight Tournament Semifinal.)
Flyweight	Aaron Tau	def.	Yin Shuai	Decision (unanimous) (30–27, 29–28, 29–28)	3	5:00	(Note: Road to UFC Season 4 Flyweight Tournament Semifinal.)
Welterweight	Kitt Campbell	def.	Jang Yun-seong	Decision (split) (28–29, 29–28, 29–28)	3	5:00

== Episode 6 ==
Road to UFC: Episode 6
- Promotion: Road to UFC
- Date: August 22, 2025
- Venue: Shanghai Indoor Stadium
- City: Shanghai, China

Main Card (UFC Fight Pass)
Weight class				Method	Round	Time	Notes
Women's Strawweight	Bruna Brasil	def.	Shi Ming	Decision (unanimous) (30–27, 30–27, 30–27)	3	5:00
Flyweight	Nyamjargal Tumendemberel	def.	Terrance Saeteurn	Technical Submission (anaconda choke)	1	2:53
Featherweight	Keiichiro Nakamura	def.	Li Kaiwen	Decision (unanimous) (29–28, 29–28, 29–27)	3	5:00	(Note: Road to UFC Season 4 Featherweight Tournament Semifinal.)
Lightweight	Kim Sang-wook	def.	Ren Yawei	Submission (rear-naked choke)	2	3:42	(Note: Road to UFC Season 4 Lightweight Tournament Semifinal.)
Bantamweight	Sulang Rangbo	def.	Sim Kai Xiong	Decision (unanimous) (30–27, 30–27, 30–27)	3	5:00	(Note: Road to UFC Season 4 Bantamweight Tournament Semifinal.)
Lightweight	Dom Mar Fan	def.	Park Jae-hyun	Decision (unanimous) (30–27, 30–27, 30–27)	3	5:00	(Note: Road to UFC Season 4 Lightweight Tournament Semifinal.)

== Tournament brackets ==
=== Lightweight ===
Quarter-finals
(Japan) Yuji Yannick Ephoeviga	3
(Australia) Dom Mar Fan	UD
(Australia) Jack Becker	2
(South Korea) Park Jae-hyun	TKO
(China) Ren Yawei	SUB
(Indonesia) Deni Daffa	1
(South Korea) Kim Sang-wook	TKO
(Japan) Daichi Kamiya	2

Semi-finals
(Australia) Dom Mar Fan	UD
(South Korea) Park Jae-hyun	3
(China) Ren Yawei	2
(South Korea) Kim Sang-wook	SUB

Final
(Australia) Dom Mar Fan	UD
(South Korea) Kim Sang-wook	3

=== Featherweight ===
Quarter-finals
(Japan) Keiichiro Nakamura	KO
(South Korea) Park Eoh-jin	2
(China) Li Kaiwen	TKO
(South Korea) Seo Dong-hyun	2
(Australia) Sebastian Szalay	UD
(China) Baergeng Jieleyisi	3
(Japan) Jin Aoi	3
(South Korea) Yoon Chang-min	SD

Semi-finals
(Japan) Keiichiro Nakamura	UD
(China) Li Kaiwen	3
(Australia) Sebastian Szalay	TKO
(South Korea) Yoon Chang-min	1

Final
(Japan) Keiichiro Nakamura	TKO
(Australia) Sebastian Szalay	3

=== Bantamweight ===
Quarter-finals
(Japan) Kuya Ito	3
(Singapore) Sim Kai Xiong	UD
(China) Sulang Rangbo	KO
(Thailand) Peter Danesoe	1
(China) Zhang Qinghe	3
(New Zealand) Lawrence Lui	UD
(Japan) Rui Imura	2
(Vietnam) Nghiêm Văn Ý	KO

Semi-finals
(Singapore) Sim Kai Xiong	3
(China) Sulang Rangbo	UD
(New Zealand) Lawrence Lui	TKO
(Vietnam) Nghiêm Văn Ý	2

Final
(China) Sulang Rangbo	3
(New Zealand) Lawrence Lui	SD

=== Flyweight ===
Quarter-finals
(China) Agulali	KO
(India) Mridul Saikia	1
(Japan) Wataru Yamauchi	2
(Mongolia) Namsrai Batbayar	KO
(China) Yin Shuai	TKO
(Japan) Kai Yoshida	1
(Indonesia) Rio Tirto	1
(New Zealand) Aaron Tau	TKO

Semi-finals
(China) Agulali	1
(Mongolia) Namsrai Batbayar	SUB
(China) Yin Shuai	3
(New Zealand) Aaron Tau	UD

Final
(Mongolia) Namsrai Batbayar	TKO
(China) Yin Shuai (Note: Batbayar's originally opponent Aaron Tau, but he rested his arms on the box in an effort to manipulate the scale, which announced at 122 pounds and the commission immediately noticed the irregularity and ordered a re-weigh without the box, Tau tipped the scale at 129 pounds, confirming the attempted deception. Therefore, Tau has been released by the promotion and Yin Shuai advanced to final instead.)	1

== See also ==
- Ultimate Fighting Championship
- Road to UFC
