= UFC Fight Night: Bautista vs. Oliveira =

Mixed martial arts event in 2026

- The poster for UFC Fight Night: Bautista vs. Oliveira
- Promotion: Ultimate Fighting Championship
- Date: February 7, 2026
- Venue: Meta Apex
- City: Enterprise, Nevada, United States
- Attendance: Not announced

Event chronology
UFC 325: Volkanovski vs. Lopes 2	UFC Fight Night: Bautista vs. Oliveira	UFC Fight Night: Strickland vs. Hernandez

UFC Fight Night: Bautista vs. Oliveira (also known as UFC Fight Night 266 and UFC Vegas 113) was a mixed martial arts event produced by the Ultimate Fighting Championship that took place on February 7, 2026, at the Meta Apex in Enterprise, Nevada, part of the Las Vegas Valley, United States.

== Background ==
This was the first Fight Night event to air during the Paramount+ era.

A bantamweight bout between Mario Bautista and Vinicius Oliveira headlined the event.

A middleweight bout between promotional newcomer José Henrique Souza and Eric Nolan was originally scheduled for the event, but Nolan withdrew for undisclosed reasons and was replaced by Nikolay Veretennikov. In turn, Souza withdrew for undisclosed reasons and was replaced by Niko Price.

A heavyweight bout between former LFA Light Heavyweight Champion Ryan Spann and Rizvan Kuniev was scheduled for this event. In turn, Spann withdrew for undisclosed reasons and was replaced by Jailton Almeida.

A light heavyweight bout between former LFA Light Heavyweight Champion Uran Satybaldiev and Julius Walker was scheduled for this event. However, Satybaldiev withdrew for undisclosed reasons and was replaced by Dustin Jacoby.

Said Nurmagomedov was scheduled to face Javid Basharat in a bantamweight bout at this event. However, Nurmagomedov was forced to pull out due to visa issues and was replaced by promotional newcomer Gianni Vázquez on 2 days notice.

At the weigh-ins, four fighters missed weight:

- Gianni Vázquez weighed in at 141 pounds, five pounds over the bantamweight non-title fight limit.
- Wang Cong and Eduarda Moura weighed in at 127.5 pounds, one and a half pounds over the women's flyweight non-title fight limit, respectively.
- Former LFA Bantamweight Champion Muin Gafurov weighed in at 141 pounds, five pounds over the bantamweight non-title fight limit.

All their bouts proceeded at catchweight and all fighters were not eligible for bonuses. Vázquez and Gafurov were fined 25 percent of their individual purses which went to their opponents Javid Basharat and former KSW Bantamweight Champion Jakub Wikłacz, respectively. Wang and Moura, who faced each other, were not fined as a result.

== Results ==
Main card (Paramount+)
Weight class				Method	Round	Time	Notes
Bantamweight	Mario Bautista	def.	Vinicius Oliveira	Submission (rear-naked choke)	2	4:46
Flyweight	Kyoji Horiguchi	def.	Amir Albazi	Decision (unanimous) (30–27, 30–27, 29–28)	3	5:00
Heavyweight	Rizvan Kuniev	def.	Jailton Almeida	Decision (unanimous) (30–27, 30–27, 29–28)	3	5:00
Middleweight	Michał Oleksiejczuk	def.	Marc-André Barriault	Decision (unanimous) (29–28, 29–28, 29–28)	3	5:00
Bantamweight	Farid Basharat	def.	Jean Matsumoto	Decision (split) (29–28, 28–29, 29–28)	3	5:00
Light Heavyweight	Dustin Jacoby	def.	Julius Walker	TKO (punches)	2	1:42
Preliminary card (Paramount+)
Welterweight	Daniil Donchenko	def.	Alex Morono	Decision (unanimous) (30–26, 30–26, 30–27)	3	5:00
Welterweight	Nikolay Veretennikov	def.	Niko Price	KO (elbow and punches)	1	1:42
Women's Strawweight	Ketlen Souza	def.	Bruna Brasil	Decision (unanimous) (29–28, 29–28, 29–28)	3	5:00
Catchweight (141 lb)	Javid Basharat	def.	Gianni Vázquez	Decision (unanimous) (29–28, 29–28, 29–28)	3	5:00
Catchweight (127.5 lb)	Wang Cong	def.	Eduarda Moura	Decision (unanimous) (30–27, 29–28, 29–28)	3	5:00
Catchweight (141 lb)	Jakub Wikłacz	def.	Muin Gafurov	Submission (guillotine choke)	3	4:59
Women's Bantamweight	Klaudia Syguła	def.	Priscila Cachoeira	Decision (unanimous) (30–27, 30–27, 29–28)	3	5:00

== Bonus awards ==
The following fighters received $100,000 bonuses. The other finishes received $25,000 additional bonuses.

- Fight of the Night: Michał Oleksiejczuk vs. Marc-André Barriault
- Performance of the Night: Mario Bautista and Jakub Wikłacz

== See also ==
- 2026 in UFC
- List of current UFC fighters
- List of UFC events
