= Wang Cong =

Chinese martial artist

- Born: 15 May 1992 (age 34); Dalian, Liaoning, China
- Native name: 王聰
- Nickname: The Joker
- Height: 5 ft 7 in (1.70 m)
- Weight: 125 lb (57 kg; 8 st 13 lb)
- Division: Lightweight (Boxing & Kickboxing); Flyweight (MMA)
- Reach: 66.5 in (169 cm)
- Style: Kickboxing, Sanda, Boxing
- Fighting out of: Liaoning Province, China
- Team: Team Alpha Male
- Years active: 2014–present

Kickboxing record
- Total: 9
- Wins: 8
- By knockout: 1
- Draws: 1

Mixed martial arts record
- Total: 12
- Wins: 10
- By knockout: 2
- By submission: 2
- By decision: 6
- Losses: 2
- By submission: 1
- By decision: 1

Other information
- Mixed martial arts record from Sherdog

Wang Cong (Chinese: 王聪; pinyin: Wáng Cōng; born 15 May 1992) is a Chinese mixed martial artist, boxer, and Sanda kickboxer currently competing in the women's Flyweight division of the Ultimate Fighting Championship (UFC). She was the Kunlun Fight Women's Lightweight Champion as well as the Kunlun Fight 2018 Legend of Mulan Tournament winner. As of October 3, 2026, she is #8 in the Meta UFC women's flyweight rankings.

With regards to her amateur credentials, she won a gold medal in Sanda at the 2013 World Wushu Championships and another gold medal at the 2014 Asian Games. She won a silver medal in amateur boxing at the 2019 World Championships.

== Kickboxing ==
Wang faced Tiffany van Soest in Las Vegas, Nevada, on November 16, 2010. The bout was declared a draw after 3 rounds

On October 31, 2015, Wang defeated future UFC Women's Flyweight Champion Valentina Shevchenko by unanimous decision at Kunlun Fight 33.

On September 9, 2018, Wang took part in an eight women one night night tournament at Kunlun Fight 76. In the quarterfinals she defeated Niamh Kinehan by unanimous decision. In the semifinals she defeated Nili Block by unanimous decision. In the final she defeated Zhu Mengjia by unanimous decision to win the tournament.

== Mixed martial arts ==
After winning her first three bouts in MMA, Wang faced her biggest challenge yet, taking on UFC vet Wu Yanan on January 20, 2024 at Kunlun Fight 95, winning the bout via unanimous decision.

Wang faced Paula Luna on May 18, 2024 at Road to UFC Season 3: Episode 2, where she submitted her opponent in the first round and won a UFC contract.

=== Ultimate Fighting Championship ===
Wang faced Victoria Leonardo on August 24, 2024 at UFC on ESPN 62. She won the fight by knockout in the first round. One day after the event, UFC CEO Dana White added a Performance of the Night award for Wang.

Wang faced Gabriella Fernandes on November 23, 2024, at UFC Fight Night 248. She was dropped by a left hook and lost the fight via a rear-naked choke submission in the second round, marking her first loss as a mixed martial artist.

Wang faced Bruna Brasil on February 9, 2025 at UFC 312. She won the fight by unanimous decision.

Wang faced Ariane da Silva on June 7, 2025 at UFC 316. At the weigh-ins, da Silva weighed in at 132 pounds, six pounds over the flyweight non-title fight limit. As a result, the bout proceeded at catchweight and da Silva was fined 25 percent of her purse which went to Wang. Wang won the fight by unanimous decision.

After both fighters missed weight, Wang faced Eduarda Moura on February 7, 2026 at UFC Fight Night 266 in a catchweight bout. She won the fight by unanimous decision.

Wang faced Tracy Cortez on July 11, 2026 at UFC 329. Despite having a point deducted as a result of an illegal knee to the head, Wang won the fight by unanimous decision.

Due to the injury of champion Valentina Shevchenko, Wang competed for the vacant UFC Women's Flyweight Championship against Natália Silva on October 3, 2026 at UFC 332. She lost the fight by unanimous decision.

== Championships and accomplishments ==
=== Kickboxing ===
- Kunlun Fight
  - Kunlun Fight 2018 Women's Tournament Champion
  - Kunlun Fight Women's Lightweight Championship

=== Mixed martial arts ===
- Ultimate Fighting Championship
  - Performance of the Night (One time) vs. Victoria Leonardo
  - Second fastest knockout & finish in UFC Women's Flyweight division history (1:02 vs. Victoria Leonardo)
  - UFC Honors Awards
    - 2024: Fan's Choice Debut of the Year Nominee vs. Victoria Leonardo

== Mixed martial arts record ==
Professional record breakdown
12 matches	10 wins	2 losses
By knockout	2	0
By submission	2	1
By decision	6	1

Res.	Record	Opponent	Method	Event	Date	Round	Time	Location	Notes
Loss	10–2	Natália Silva	Decision (unanimous)	UFC 332	October 3, 2026	5	5:00	Salt Lake City, Utah, United States	For the vacant UFC Women's Flyweight Championship.
Win	10–1	Tracy Cortez	Decision (unanimous)	UFC 329	July 11, 2026	3	5:00	Las Vegas, Nevada, United States	Wang was deducted one point in round 2 due to an illegal knee to a grounded opponent.
Win	9–1	Eduarda Moura	Decision (unanimous)	UFC Fight Night: Bautista vs. Oliveira	February 7, 2026	3	5:00	Las Vegas, Nevada, United States	Catchweight (127.5 lb) bout; both fighters missed weight.
Win	8–1	Ariane da Silva	Decision (unanimous)	UFC 316	June 7, 2025	3	5:00	Newark, New Jersey, United States	Catchweight (132 lb) bout; da Silva missed weight.
Win	7–1	Bruna Brasil	Decision (unanimous)	UFC 312	February 9, 2025	3	5:00	Sydney, Australia	
Loss	6–1	Gabriella Fernandes	Technical Submission (rear-naked choke)	UFC Fight Night: Yan vs. Figueiredo	November 23, 2024	2	3:49	Macau SAR, China	
Win	6–0	Victoria Leonardo	KO (punches)	UFC on ESPN: Cannonier vs. Borralho	August 24, 2024	1	1:02	Las Vegas, Nevada, United States	Performance of the Night.
Win	5–0	Paula Luna	Submission (guillotine choke)	Road to UFC Season 3: Episode 2	May 18, 2024	1	3:04	Shanghai, China	
Win	4–0	Wu Yanan	Decision (unanimous)	Kunlun Fight 95	January 20, 2024	3	5:00	Bangkok, Thailand	
Win	3–0	Amena Hadaya	Decision (unanimous)	UAE Warriors 45	October 17, 2023	3	5:00	Abu Dhabi, United Arab Emirates	Flyweight debut.
Win	2–0	Tae Murayama	TKO (head kick and punches)	Dragon FC 7	July 22, 2023	1	1:53	Daye, China	Catchweight (128 lb) bout.
Win	1–0	Ji Hongfeng	Submission (rear-naked choke)	Huya FC 6	July 9, 2022	2	N/A	Zhengzhou, China	Catchweight (132 lb) bout.

== Kickboxing record ==
Professional Kickboxing and Muay Thai record (Incomplete)
Date	Result	Opponent	Event	Location	Method	Round	Time
2018-09-29	Win	(Netherlands) Sarel de Jong	David Zunwu World Fighting Championship	Macau	Decision	3	3:00
2018-09-09	Win	(China) Zhu Mengjia	Kunlun Fight 76 - 2018 Legend of Mulan Tournament, Final	Shangqiu, China	Decision (Unanimous)	3	3:00
Wins the Kunlun Fight 2018 Legend of Mulan Tournament.
2018-09-09	Win	(Israel) Nili Block	Kunlun Fight 76 - 2018 Legend of Mulan Tournament, Semi Finals	Shangqiu, China	Decision (Unanimous)	3	3:00
2018-09-09	Win	(England) Niamh Kinehan	Kunlun Fight 76 - 2018 Legend of Mulan Tournament, Quarter Finals	Shangqiu, China	Decision (Unanimous)	3	3:00
2018-04-07	Win	(France) Marion Montanari	Wu Lin Feng 2018: Shijiazhuang	Shijiazhuang, China	Decision	3	3:00
2017-10-28	Win	(Ukraine) Natalia Leskiv	WKA World Super Sanda King	Beijing, China	KO (Straight to the body)	3	1:48
2016-01-09	Win	(Russia) Svetlana Vinnikova	Kunlun Fight 36	Shanghai, China	Decision (Unanimous)	3	3:00
2015-10-31	Win	(Kyrgyzstan) Valentina Shevchenko	Kunlun Fight 33	Changde, China	Decision (Unanimous)	3	3:00
Wins the Kunlun Fight Women's Lightweight Championship.
2010-11-13	Draw	(United States) Tiffany van Soest	Wu Lin Feng: Las Vegas Spectacular	Las Vegas, Nevada, USA	Draw (majority)	3	3:00
Legend: Win Loss Draw/No contest Notes
