= Jason Herzog =

American mixed martial arts referee

- Occupation: Mixed martial arts referee
- Known for: Officiating in the UFC and Bellator MMA

Jason Herzog is an American mixed martial arts (MMA) referee. He has officiated for major promotions including the Ultimate Fighting Championship (UFC) and Bellator MMA.

Herzog has been involved in several high-profile and controversial bouts. In 2020, he accepted responsibility for a late stoppage in the fight between Anthony Smith and Glover Teixeira.

He has also faced criticism for other stoppages, including at UFC Louisville in 2024, and UFC 285 in 2023.

Despite controversies, Herzog has been described as one of the most experienced referees in MMA, and has discussed potential reforms to judging and officiating in the sport.

At UFC Fight Night: Cortes-Acosta vs. Walker on November 7, 2026, for the Priscila Cachoeira vs. Nina Nikolija Milošević bout, Herzog refereed his 500th UFC bout.
