= Road to UFC Season 2 =

Mixed martial arts competition

Information
- Promotion: UFC
- First date aired: May 27, 2023

Road to UFC Season 2 is the 2023 cycle of Road to UFC, a mixed martial arts (MMA) event series in which top Asian MMA prospects compete to win contracts with the Ultimate Fighting Championship (UFC).

== Background ==
The event series features four divisions— flyweight, bantamweight, featherweight and lightweight—each for which eight fighters compete in a "win-and-advance" tournament format. The tournament winner for each division is awarded a UFC contract. Each event in the series is to feature five bouts including one non-tournament bout.

The opening quarterfinal round of the tournament was held across two days, May 27-28, 2023 at the UFC Performance Institute Shanghai, with two five-bout events for each day for a total of 10 bouts per day. The semifinals took place on August 27, 2023 – a day after UFC Fight Night: Holloway vs. The Korean Zombie – at Singapore Indoor Stadium. The finals were held at the UFC Apex facility on February 3, 2024.

== Episode 1 ==
Road to UFC: Episode 1
- Promotion: Road to UFC
- Date: May 27, 2023
- Venue: UFC Performance Institute Shanghai
- City: Shanghai, China

Main Card (UFC Fight Pass)
Weight class				Method	Round	Time	Notes
Featherweight	Kim Sang-won	def.	Keisuke Sasu	KO (punches)	2	1:42	(Note: Featherweight quarterfinals)
Flyweight	Mark Climaco	def.	Lee Jung-hyun	Decision (unanimous) (30–27, 30–27, 30–27)	3	5:00	(Note: Flyweight quarterfinals)
Featherweight	Yi Zha	def.	Wuziazibieke Jiahefu	Submission (armbar)	1	2:28	(Note: Featherweight quarterfinals)
Flyweight	Rei Tsuruya	def.	Ronal Siahaan	Submission (scarf hold armlock)	2	1:19	(Note: Flyweight quarterfinals)
Flyweight	Nyamjargal Tumendemberel	def.	Topnoi Kiwram	Decision (split) (29–28, 28–29, 29–28)	3	5:00

== Episode 2 ==
Road to UFC: Episode 2
- Promotion: Road to UFC
- Date: May 27, 2023
- Venue: UFC Performance Institute Shanghai
- City: Shanghai, China

Main Card (UFC Fight Pass)
Weight class				Method	Round	Time	Notes
Featherweight	Li Kaiwen	def.	Lu Kai	KO (punches)	1	1:11	(Note: Featherweight quarterfinals)
Flyweight	Choi Seung-guk	def.	Sumit Kumar	Decision (unanimous) (29–28, 29–28, 29–28)	3	5:00	(Note: Flyweight quarterfinals)
Featherweight	Kouya Kanda	def.	Yibugele	Decision (unanimous) (30–27, 30–27, 29–28)	3	5:00	(Note: Featherweight quarterfinals)
Flyweight	Ji Niushiyue	def.	Billy Pasulatan	TKO (punches)	1	3:04	(Note: Flyweight quarterfinals)
Welterweight	Taiyilake Nueraji	def.	Kim Han-seul	KO (elbow)	2	1:38

== Episode 3 ==
Road to UFC: Episode 3
- Promotion: Road to UFC
- Date: May 28, 2023
- Venue: UFC Performance Institute Shanghai
- City: Shanghai, China

Main Card (UFC Fight Pass)
Weight class				Method	Round	Time	Notes
Lightweight	Rong Zhu	def.	Hong Seong-chan	TKO (punches)	1	2:17	(Note: Lightweight quarterfinals)
Bantamweight	Shuya Kamikubo	def.	Jieleyisi Baergeng	Decision (split) (30–27, 28–29, 29–28)	3	5:00	(Note: Bantamweight quarterfinals)
Lightweight	Kim Sang-wook	def.	Kazuma Maruyama	Submission (barbo choke)	1	3:08	(Note: Lightweight quarterfinals)
Bantamweight	Xiao Long	def.	Shohei Nose	Decision (split) (29–28, 28–29, 29–28)	3	5:00	(Note: Bantamweight quarterfinals)
Welterweight	Yoo Sang-hoon	def.	Chris Hofmann	TKO (knee and punches)	3	3:10

== Episode 4 ==
Road to UFC: Episode 4
- Promotion: Road to UFC
- Date: May 28, 2023
- Venue: UFC Performance Institute Shanghai
- City: Shanghai, China

Main Card (UFC Fight Pass)
Weight class				Method	Round	Time	Notes
Lightweight	Batebolati Bahatebole	def.	Ki Won-bin	Disqualification (punches to back of head)	2	2:22	(Note: Lightweight quarterfinals)
Bantamweight	Lee Chang-ho	def.	Rudra Pratap Singh	TKO (elbows and punches)	1	3:52	(Note: Bantamweight quarterfinals)
Lightweight	Shin Haraguchi	def.	Wendris Patilima	TKO (punches)	2	1:25	(Note: Lightweight quarterfinals)
Bantamweight	Daermisi Zhawupasi	def.	Eperaim Ginting	Submission (rear-naked choke)	1	0:58	(Note: Bantamweight quarterfinals)
Flyweight	Peter Danasoe	def.	Sim Kai Xiong	KO (flying knee)	1	4:23

== Episode 5 ==
Road to UFC: Episode 5
- Promotion: Road to UFC
- Date: August 27, 2023
- Venue: Singapore Indoor Stadium
- City: Kallang, Singapore

Main Card (UFC Fight Pass)
Weight class				Method	Round	Time	Notes
Featherweight	Li Kai Wen	def.	Koya Kanda	Decision (unanimous) (30–27, 29–28, 29–28)	3	5:00	(Note: Featherweight semifinals)
Flyweight	Ji Niushiyue	def.	Choi Seung-guk	Decision (unanimous) (30–27, 30–27, 30–27)	3	5:00	(Note: Flyweight semifinals)
Featherweight	Yi Zha	def.	Kim Sang-won	Decision (unanimous) (29–28, 29–28, 29–28)	3	5:00	(Note: Featherweight semifinals)
Flyweight	Rei Tsuruya	def.	Mark Climaco	Decision (unanimous) (30–27, 29–28, 29–27)	3	5:00	(Note: Flyweight semifinals)
Flyweight	Nyamjargal Tumendemberel	def.	Peter Danasoe	Technical Submission (rear-naked choke)	1	1:02

== Episode 6 ==
Road to UFC: Episode 6
- Promotion: Road to UFC
- Date: August 27, 2023
- Venue: Singapore Indoor Stadium
- City: Kallang, Singapore

Main Card (UFC Fight Pass)
Weight class				Method	Round	Time	Notes
Lightweight	Shin Haraguchi	def.	Park Jae-hyun	Decision (unanimous) (30–27, 29–28, 29–28)	3	5:00	(Note: Lightweight semifinals)
Bantamweight	Lee Chang-ho	def.	Daermisi Zhawupasi	TKO (punches)	3	3:35	(Note: Bantamweight semifinals)
Featherweight	Rong Zhu	def.	Kim Sang-wook	Decision (unanimous) (30–26, 29–28, 29–28)	3	5:00	(Note: Lightweight semifinals)
Bantamweight	Xiao Long	def.	Shuya Kamikubo	Decision (majority) (29–28, 29–27, 28–28)	3	5:00	(Note: Bantamweight semifinals)

== Episode 7 ==
Road to UFC: Episode 7
- Promotion: Road to UFC
- Date: February 3, 2024
- Venue: UFC Apex
- City: Las Vegas, Nevada, United States

The bantamweight final between Xiao Long and Lee Chang-ho was scheduled for this episode. However. Xiao was forced out of the bout due to visa issues and an undisclosed injury. The bout eventually took place at UFC on ABC: Whittaker vs. Aliskerov.

Main Card (UFC Fight Pass)
Weight class				Method	Round	Time	Notes
Lightweight	Rong Zhu	def.	Shin Haraguchi	Submission (rear-naked choke)	3	3:06	(Note: Lightweight Finals)
Featherweight	Yi Zha	def.	Li Kai Wen	Submission (armbar)	1	3:03	(Note: Featherweight Finals. Li missed weight (149.5 lb).)
Flyweight	Rei Tsuruya	def.	Ji Niushiyue	TKO (punches)	1	4:59	(Note: Flyweight Finals)

== Flyweight tournament bracket ==
Quarter-finals
(Japan) Rei Tsuruya	SUB
(Indonesia) Ronal Siahaan	2
(Philippines) Mark Climaco	UD
(South Korea) Lee Jung-hyun	3
(China) Ji Niushiyue	TKO
(Indonesia) Billy Pasulatan	1
(India) Sumit Kumar	3
(South Korea) Choi Seung-guk	UD

Semi-finals
(Japan) Rei Tsuruya	UD
(Philippines) Mark Climaco	3
(China) Ji Niushiyue	UD
(South Korea) Choi Seung-guk	3

Final
(Japan) Rei Tsuruya	TKO
(China) Ji Niushiyue	1

== Bantamweight tournament bracket ==
Quarter-finals
(China) Xiao Long	SD
(Japan) Shohei Nose	3
(Japan) Shuya Kamikubo	SD
(China) Jieleyisi Baergeng	3
(Indonesia) Eperaim Ginting	1
(China) Daermisi Zhawupasi	SUB
(South Korea) Lee Chang-ho	TKO
(India) Rudra Pratap Singh	1

Semi-finals
(China) Xiao Long	MD
(Japan) Shuya Kamikubo	3
(China) Daermisi Zhawupasi	3
(South Korea) Lee Chang-ho	TKO

Final
(China) Xiao Long	3
(South Korea) Lee Chang-ho	SD

== Featherweight tournament bracket ==
Quarter-finals
(China) Yi Zha	SUB
(China) Wuziazibieke Jiahefu	1
(Japan) Keisuke Sasu	2
(South Korea) Kim Sang-won	KO
(China) Yibugele	3
(Japan) Kouya Kanda	UD
(China) Li Kai Wen	KO
(China) Lu Kai	1

Semi-finals
(China) Yi Zha	UD
(South Korea) Kim Sang-won	3
(Japan) Kouya Kanda	3
(China) Li Kai Wen	UD

Final
(China) Yi Zha	SUB
(China) Li Kai Wen	1

== Lightweight tournament bracket ==
Quarter-finals
(South Korea) Hong Seong-chan	1
(China) Rong Zhu	TKO
(Japan) Kazuma Maruyama	1
(South Korea) Kim Sang-wook	SUB
(Indonesia) Wendris Patilima	2
(Japan) Shin Haraguchi	TKO
(South Korea) Ki Won-bin	2
(China) Batebolati Bahatebole	DQ

Semi-finals
(China) Rong Zhu	UD
(South Korea) Kim Sang-wook	3
(Japan) Shin Haraguchi	UD
(South Korea) Park Jae-hyun*	3

Final
(China) Rong Zhu	SUB
(Japan) Shin Haraguchi	3

- Park Jae-hyun, who was scheduled to fight Quillan Salkilld in a non-tournament bout, replaced Batebolati Bahatebole who weighed in at 161lbs and was not medically cleared to fight.

== See also ==
- Ultimate Fighting Championship
- Road to UFC
