= UFC Fight Night: Yan vs. Figueiredo =

Mixed martial arts event in 2024

- The poster for UFC Fight Night: Yan vs. Figueiredo
- Promotion: Ultimate Fighting Championship
- Date: November 23, 2024
- Venue: Galaxy Arena
- City: Macau SAR, China
- Attendance: 12,615
- Total gate: Not announced

Event chronology
UFC 309: Jones vs. Miocic	UFC Fight Night: Yan vs. Figueiredo	UFC 310: Pantoja vs. Asakura

UFC Fight Night: Yan vs. Figueiredo (also known as UFC Fight Night 248 and UFC on ESPN+ 106) was a mixed martial arts event produced by the Ultimate Fighting Championship that took place on November 23, 2024, at the Galaxy Arena in Macau SAR, China.

== Background ==
The event marked the promotion's fourth visit to Macau and first since UFC Fight Night: Bisping vs. Le in August 2014.

A bantamweight bout between former UFC Bantamweight Champion Petr Yan and former two-time UFC Flyweight Champion Deiveson Figueiredo headlined the event.

The four finals of the Road to UFC Season 3 took place at this event. However, the featherweight final between Xie Bin and Zhu Kangjie was postponed as a result of Zhu being injured.

== Results ==
Main card (ESPN+)
Weight class				Method	Round	Time	Notes
Bantamweight	Petr Yan	def.	Deiveson Figueiredo	Decision (unanimous) (50–45, 50–45, 50–45)	5	5:00
Women's Strawweight	Yan Xiaonan	def.	Tabatha Ricci	Decision (unanimous) (30–27, 30–27, 30–27)	3	5:00
Welterweight	Muslim Salikhov	def.	Song Kenan	KO (spinning wheel kick)	1	3:49
Women's Flyweight	Gabriella Fernandes	def.	Wang Cong	Technical Submission (rear-naked choke)	2	3:49
Light Heavyweight	Carlos Ulberg	def.	Volkan Oezdemir	Decision (unanimous) (30–27, 30–27, 29–28)	3	5:00
Light Heavyweight	Zhang Mingyang	def.	Ozzy Diaz	TKO (elbow and punches)	1	2:25
Preliminary card (ESPN+)
Bantamweight	You Su-young	def.	Baergeng Jieleyisi	Decision (unanimous) (30–27, 30–27, 29–28)	3	5:00	(Note: Road to UFC Season 3 Bantamweight Tournament final.)
Flyweight	Choi Dong-hun	def.	Kiru Singh Sahota	KO (punches)	1	2:36	(Note: Road to UFC Season 3 Flyweight Tournament final.)
Women's Strawweight	Shi Ming	def.	Feng Xiaocan	KO (head kick)	3	0:46	(Note: Road to UFC Season 3 Women's Strawweight Tournament final.)
Flyweight	Carlos Hernandez	def.	Nyamjargal Tumendemberel	Decision (split) (29–28, 28–29, 29–28)	3	5:00
Flyweight	Lone'er Kavanagh	def.	Jose Ochoa	Decision (unanimous) (30–27, 29–28, 29–28)	3	5:00
Bantamweight	Xiao Long	def.	Quang Le	KO (punch)	3	1:28
Lightweight	Nikolas Motta	def.	Maheshate Hayisaer	Decision (unanimous) (30–27, 30–27, 30–27)	3	5:00

== Bonus awards ==
The following fighters received $50,000 bonuses.

- Fight of the Night: No bonus awarded.
- Performance of the Night: Muslim Salikhov, Gabriella Fernandes, Zhang Mingyang, and Shi Ming

== See also ==
- 2024 in UFC
- List of current UFC fighters
- List of UFC events
