= Road to UFC Season 3 =

Mixed martial arts competition

Information
- Promotion: UFC
- First date aired: May 18, 2024

Road to UFC Season 3 is the 2024 cycle of Road to UFC, a mixed martial arts (MMA) event series in which top Asian MMA prospects compete to win contracts with the Ultimate Fighting Championship (UFC).

== Background ==
The event series features four divisions—flyweight, bantamweight, featherweight, and, notably, women's strawweight (replacing lightweight)—each for which eight fighters compete in a "win-and-advance" tournament format. The tournament winner of each division is awarded a UFC contract. Each event within the series contains five bouts, one of which is a non-tournament match-up.

The inaugural quarterfinal stage of the tournament took place over two days, May 18-19, 2024, at the UFC Performance Institute Shanghai, with two five-bout events for each day for a total of 10 bouts per day. The semifinals were held at the UFC Apex facility on August 23, 2024. The finals took place at UFC Fight Night: Yan vs. Figueiredo on November 23, 2024.

== Episode 1 ==
Road to UFC: Episode 1
- Promotion: Road to UFC
- Date: May 18, 2024
- Venue: UFC Performance Institute Shanghai
- City: Shanghai, China

Main Card (UFC Fight Pass)
Weight class				Method	Round	Time	Notes
Featherweight	Zhu Kangjie	def.	Tatsuya Ando	Decision (unanimous) (30–26, 30–26, 30–25)	3	5:00	(Note: Road to UFC Season 3 Featherweight Tournament Quarterfinal.)
Featherweight	Shin Haraguchi	def.	Jun Young Hong	Decision (unanimous) (30–25, 30–27, 30–27)	3	5:00	(Note: Road to UFC Season 3 Featherweight Tournament Quarterfinal.)
Women's Strawweight	Feng Xiaocan	def.	Kiran Singh	TKO (punches)	1	2:03	(Note: Road to UFC Season 3 Women's Strawweight Tournament Quarterfinal.)
Welterweight	Bahatebole Batebolati	def.	Han Seul Kim	Decision (unanimous) (29–28, 29–28, 29–28)	3	5:00

== Episode 2 ==
Road to UFC: Episode 2
- Promotion: Road to UFC
- Date: May 18, 2024
- Venue: UFC Performance Institute Shanghai
- City: Shanghai, China

Main Card (UFC Fight Pass)
Weight class				Method	Round	Time	Notes
Featherweight	Xie Bin	def.	Yibugele	Decision (unanimous) (30–27, 30–27, 30–27)	3	5:00	(Note: Road to UFC Season 3 Featherweight Tournament Quarterfinal.)
Women's Strawweight	Shi Ming	def.	Ye Dam Seo	Decision (unanimous) (29–28, 29–28, 29–28)	3	5:00	(Note: Road to UFC Season 3 Women's Strawweight Tournament Quarterfinal.)
Featherweight	Masuto Kawana	def.	Young Jae Song	Decision (unanimous) (30–26, 30–27, 30–27)	3	5:00	(Note: Road to UFC Season 3 Featherweight Tournament Quarterfinal.)
Women's Strawweight	Dong Huaxiang	def.	Priya Sharma	Decision (unanimous) (30–27, 30–27, 30–27)	3	5:00	(Note: Road to UFC Season 3 Women's Strawweight Tournament Quarterfinal.)
Women's Flyweight	Wang Cong	def.	Paula Luna	Submission (guillotine choke)	1	3:04

== Episode 3 ==
Road to UFC: Episode 3
- Promotion: Road to UFC
- Date: May 19, 2024
- Venue: UFC Performance Institute Shanghai
- City: Shanghai, China

Main Card (UFC Fight Pass)
Weight class				Method	Round	Time	Notes
Bantamweight	Daermisi Zhawupasi	def.	Ren Ozaki	Decision (unanimous) (29–28, 29–28, 29–28)	3	5:00	(Note: Road to UFC Season 3 Bantamweight Tournament Quarterfinal.)
Flyweight	Angad Bisht	def.	John Dave Almanza	TKO (elbows and punches)	1	3:39	(Note: Road to UFC Season 3 Flyweight Tournament Quarterfinal.)
Bantamweight	Su Young You	def.	Shohei Nose	Decision (unanimous) (30–27, 30–27, 29–28)	3	5:00	(Note: Road to UFC Season 3 Bantamweight Tournament Quarterfinal.)
Flyweight	Dong Hun Choi	def.	Ji Niushiyue	Decision (split) (29–28, 29–28, 28–29)	3	5:00	(Note: Road to UFC Season 3 Flyweight Tournament Quarterfinal.)
Lightweight	Won Bin Ki	def.	Tatsuya Saika	TKO (punches)	2	0:51

== Episode 4 ==
Road to UFC: Episode 4
- Promotion: Road to UFC
- Date: May 19, 2024
- Venue: UFC Performance Institute Shanghai
- City: Shanghai, China

Main Card (UFC Fight Pass)
Weight class				Method	Round	Time	Notes
Bantamweight	Baergeng Jieleyisi	def.	Li Yunfeng	Technical Submission (rear-naked choke)	2	4:25	(Note: Road to UFC Season 3 Bantamweight Tournament Quarterfinal.)
Flyweight	Kiru Singh Sahota	def.	Yin Shuai	Decision (split) (29–28, 27–30, 29–28)	3	5:00	(Note: Road to UFC Season 3 Flyweight Tournament Quarterfinal.)
Bantamweight	Tokitaka Nakanishi	def.	Kyu Sung Kim	Decision (unanimous) (30–27, 30–27, 29–27)	3	5:00	(Note: Road to UFC Season 3 Flyweight Tournament Quarterfinal.)
Women's Flyweight	Yan Qihui	def.	Lisa Kyriacou	Decision (split) (30–27, 28–29, 30–27)	3	5:00

== Episode 5 ==
Road to UFC: Episode 5
- Promotion: Road to UFC
- Date: August 23, 2024
- Venue: UFC Apex
- City: Las Vegas, Nevada, United States

Main Card (UFC Fight Pass)
Weight class				Method	Round	Time	Notes
Bantamweight	Baergeng Jieleyisi	def.	Tokitaka Nakanishi	Decision (unanimous) (29–28, 29–28, 29–28)	3	5:00	(Note: Road to UFC Season 3 Bantamweight Tournament Semifinal.)
Flyweight	Dong Hun Choi	def.	Angad Bisht	Decision (split) (29–28, 28–29, 29–28)	3	5:00	(Note: Road to UFC Season 3 Flyweight Tournament Semifinal.)
Bantamweight	Su Young You	def.	Daermisi Zhawupasi	Decision (split) (30–27, 28–29, 29–28)	3	5:00	(Note: Road to UFC Season 3 Bantamweight Tournament Semifinal.)
Flyweight	Kiru Singh Sahota	def.	Ruel Pañales	Decision (unanimous) (30–27, 30–27, 29–28)	3	5:00	(Note: Road to UFC Season 3 Flyweight Tournament Semifinal.)
Women's Flyweight	Danni McCormack	def.	Yan Qihui	Decision (unanimous) (30–27, 30–27, 29–27)	3	5:00

== Episode 6 ==
Road to UFC: Episode 6
- Promotion: Road to UFC
- Date: August 23, 2024
- Venue: UFC Apex
- City: Las Vegas, Nevada, United States

Main Card (UFC Fight Pass)
Weight class				Method	Round	Time	Notes
Featherweight	Xie Bin	def.	Masuto Kawana	KO (punches)	1	4:17	(Note: Road to UFC Season 3 Featherweight Tournament Semifinal.)
Women's Strawweight	Shi Ming	vs.	Dong Huaxiang	Decision (split) (29–28, 27–30, 29–28)	3	5:00	(Note: Road to UFC Season 3 Women's Strawweight Tournament Semifinal.)
Featherweight	Zhu Kangjie	def.	Shin Haraguchi	Decision (split) (29–28, 28–29, 29–28)	3	5:00	(Note: Road to UFC Season 3 Featherweight Tournament Semifinal.)
Women's Strawweight	Feng Xiaocan	def.	Miki Motono	Decision (unanimous) (30–27, 29–28, 29–28)	3	5:00	(Note: Road to UFC Season 3 Women's Strawweight Tournament Semifinal.)
Welterweight	Samandar Murodov	def.	Jonathan Piersma	Decision (unanimous) (30–27, 30–27, 30–27)	3	5:00	(Note: Piersma missed weight (174 lb).)

== Brackets ==
=== Flyweight ===
Quarter-finals
(China) Yin Shuai	3
(United Kingdom) Kiru Singh Sahota	SD
(Philippines) Ruel Pañales*	BYE
(Japan) Toki Matsui	–
(China) Ji Niushiyue	3
(South Korea) Dong Hun Choi	SD
(India) Angad Bisht	TKO
(Philippines) John Dave Almanza	1

Semi-finals
(United Kingdom) Kiru Singh Sahota	UD
(Philippines) Ruel Pañales	3
(South Korea) Dong Hun Choi	SD
(India) Angad Bisht	3

Final
(United Kingdom) Kiru Singh Sahota	1
(South Korea) Dong Hun Choi	KO

*Toki Matsui missed weight (132 lbs), therefore the bout was cancelled and Pañales proceeded to the semi-finals

=== Bantamweight ===
Quarter-finals
(South Korea) Kyu Sung Kim	3
(Japan) Tokitaka Nakanishi	UD
(China) Li Yunfeng	2
(China) Baergeng Jieleyisi	SUB
(Japan) Ren Ozaki	3
(China) Daermisi Zhawupasi	UD
(South Korea) Su Young You	UD
(Japan) Shohei Nose	3

Semi-finals
(Japan) Tokitaka Nakanishi	3
(China) Baergeng Jieleyisi	UD
(China) Daermisi Zhawupasi	3
(South Korea) Su Young You	SD

Final
(China) Baergeng Jieleyisi	3
(South Korea) Su Young You	UD

=== Featherweight ===
Quarter-finals
(China) Xie Bin	UD
(China) Yibugele	3
(South Korea) Young Jae Song	3
(Japan) Masuto Kawana	UD
(China) Zhu Kangjie	UD
(Japan) Tatsuya Ando	3
(South Korea) Jun Young Hong	3
(Japan) Shin Haraguchi	UD

Semi-finals
(China) Xie Bin	KO
(Japan) Masuto Kawana	3
(China) Zhu Kangjie	SD
(Japan) Shin Haraguchi	3

Final
(China) Xie Bin	3
(China) Zhu Kangjie	SD

=== Women's Strawweight ===
Quarter-finals
(India) Priya Sharma	3
(China) Dong Huaxiang	UD
(South Korea) Ye Dam Seo	3
(China) Shi Ming	UD
(China) Feng Xiaocan	TKO
(India) Kiran Singh	1
(Japan) Miki Motono*	BYE
(China) Huang Feier	–

Semi-finals
(China) Dong Huaxiang	3
(China) Shi Ming	SD
(China) Feng Xiaocan	UD
(Japan) Miki Motono	3

Final
(China) Shi Ming	KO
(China) Feng Xiaocan	3

* Huang Feier missed weight (116.7 lbs), therefore the bout was canceled and Motono proceeded to semi-final

== See also ==
- Ultimate Fighting Championship
- Road to UFC
