= UFC 325 =

Mixed martial arts event in 2026

UFC 325: Volkanovski vs. Lopes 2
- The poster for UFC 325: Volkanovski vs. Lopes 2
- Promotion: Ultimate Fighting Championship
- Date: February 1, 2026
- Venue: Qudos Bank Arena
- City: Sydney, Australia
- Attendance: 18,102
- Total gate: $10,103,136

Event chronology
UFC 324: Gaethje vs. Pimblett	UFC 325: Volkanovski vs. Lopes 2	UFC Fight Night: Bautista vs. Oliveira

UFC 325: Volkanovski vs. Lopes 2 was a mixed martial arts event produced by the Ultimate Fighting Championship that took place on February 1, 2026, at the Qudos Bank Arena in Sydney, Australia.

== Background ==
The event marked the promotion's eighth visit to Sydney and first since UFC 312 in February 2025.

A UFC Featherweight Championship rematch between reigning two-time champion Alexander Volkanovski and former title challenger Diego Lopes headlined the event. The pair previously met at UFC 314 in April 2025, where Volkanovski captured the vacant championship with a unanimous decision victory.

A welterweight bout between Oban Elliott and Jonathan Micallef took place at the event. The pairing was originally expected to take place at UFC Fight Night: Ulberg vs. Reyes in September 2025, but was cancelled less than 48 hours before the event after Elliott withdrew due to illness.

A heavyweight bout between Serghei Spivac and 2022 PFL Heavyweight Tournament winner Ante Delija was initially scheduled for this event. The bout was later rescheduled to UFC Fight Night: Strickland vs. Hernandez in February.

A lightweight bout between Road to UFC Season 2 lightweight tournament winner Rong Zhu and Quillan Salkilld was originally scheduled for this event. However, Rong withdrew for undisclosed reasons and was replaced by Jamie Mullarkey.

A light heavyweight bout between Jimmy Crute and Dustin Jacoby was scheduled for this event. However, Crute withdrew due to a ruptured ACL and the bout was cancelled. Jacoby was then re-scheduled to compete the following week at UFC Fight Night: Bautista vs. Oliveira.

Additionally, three Road to UFC Season 4 finals took place at the event. The flyweight tournament final between Aaron Tau and Namsrai Batbayar was also scheduled for the event. At the weigh-ins, Tau initially used a curtained privacy box and weighed in at 122.5 pounds, 3.5 pounds under the flyweight non-title fight limit. When asked for a second attempt without the box, he then weighed in at 129 pounds, three pounds over the limit, resulting in the cancellation of the bout.

== Results ==
Main card (Paramount+)
Weight class				Method	Round	Time	Notes
Featherweight	Alexander Volkanovski (c)	def.	Diego Lopes	Decision (unanimous) (49–46, 49–46, 50–45)	5	5:00	(Note: For the UFC Featherweight Championship.)
Lightweight	Benoît Saint Denis	def.	Dan Hooker	TKO (punches)	2	4:45
Lightweight	Maurício Ruffy	def.	Rafael Fiziev	TKO (punches)	2	4:30
Heavyweight	Tallison Teixeira	def.	Tai Tuivasa	Decision (unanimous) (29–28, 29–28, 29–28)	3	5:00
Lightweight	Quillan Salkilld	def.	Jamie Mullarkey	Submission (neck crank)	1	3:02
Preliminary card (Paramount+)
Light Heavyweight	Billy Elekana	def.	Junior Tafa	Submission (rear-naked choke)	2	3:18
Middleweight	Cameron Rowston	def.	Cody Brundage	TKO (punches)	2	4:08
Middleweight	Jacob Malkoun	def.	Torrez Finney	Decision (unanimous) (30–27, 30–26, 30–26)	3	5:00
Welterweight	Jonathan Micallef	def.	Oban Elliott	Technical Submission (rear-naked choke)	2	3:31
Early preliminary card (Paramount+ / UFC Fight Pass)
Featherweight	Kaan Ofli	def.	Yi Zha	Decision (majority) (29–28, 28–28, 29–28)	3	5:00
Lightweight	Dom Mar Fan	def.	Kim Sang-wook	Decision (unanimous) (30–27, 30–27, 30–27)	3	5:00	(Note: Road to UFC Season 4 Lightweight Tournament final.)
Featherweight	Keiichiro Nakamura	def.	Sebastian Szalay	TKO (knee and punches)	3	3:48	(Note: Road to UFC Season 4 Featherweight Tournament final.)
Bantamweight	Lawrence Lui	def.	Sulangrangbo	Decision (split) (29-28, 29-28, 28-29)	3	5:00	(Note: Road to UFC Season 4 Bantamweight Tournament final.)

== Bonus awards ==
The following fighters received $100,000 bonuses. The other finishes received $25,000 additional bonuses.

- Fight of the Night: Alexander Volkanovski vs. Diego Lopes
- Performance of the Night: Maurício Ruffy and Quillan Salkilld

== See also ==
- 2026 in UFC
- List of current UFC fighters
- List of UFC events
- Mixed martial arts in Australia
