= Rong Zhu =

Chinese mixed martial artist (born 2000)

- Born: March 7, 2000 (age 26); Heishui, Aba Prefecture, Sichuan, China
- Native name: 茸主
- Other names: Little Yama
- Height: 5 ft 9 in (1.75 m)
- Weight: 155 lb (70 kg; 11 st 1 lb)
- Division: Lightweight
- Reach: 71 in (180 cm)
- Fighting out of: Chengdu, Sichuan, China
- Team: Enbo Fight Club; American Top Team; City Kickboxing
- Years active: 2016–present

Mixed martial arts record
- Total: 35
- Wins: 29
- By knockout: 16
- By submission: 6
- By decision: 6
- By disqualification: 1
- Losses: 6
- By knockout: 1
- By submission: 4
- By decision: 1

Other information
- Mixed martial arts record from Sherdog

Rong Zhu (Chinese: 茸主; born March 7, 2000) is a Chinese mixed martial artist who competes in the Lightweight division of the Ultimate Fighting Championship (UFC).

== Background ==
An ethnic Tibetan, Rong began practicing Sanda since the age of 12. After three years of training but underachieving, he had decided to switch sports; however, upon seeing MMA on TV, he instantly became attracted to the sport. Later, after being introduced by his uncle, Rong started training at Enbo Fight Club as an assistant and sparring partner for Su Mudaerji, where his duties included tasks such as carrying towels and water.

== Mixed martial arts career ==
=== Early career ===
Having his first pro fight just days after his 16th birthday in 2016, Rong compiled a 17–3 record on the Chinese regional scene, most off it with the promotion WLF, where he captured the Lightweight title and defended it three times.

=== Ultimate Fighting Championship ===
Rong made his UFC debut against Kazula Vargas at UFC 261 on April 24, 2021. He lost the fight via unanimous decision.

For his second fight in the UFC, Rong was initially scheduled to face Dakota Bush on September 18, 2021, at UFC Fight Night 192. However, Bush tested positive for COVID-19 during fight week and was replaced by Brandon Jenkins. At the weigh-ins, Rong weighed in at 158 pounds, two pounds over the lightweight non-title fight limit. The bout proceeded at a catchweight and he forfeited 20% of his purse to his opponent. He won the fight via technical knockout in round three.

Rong faced Ignacio Bahamondes at UFC Fight Night 202 on February 26, 2022. At the weigh-ins, Rong weighed in at 160 pounds, 4 pounds over the lightweight non-title fight limit. It was the second straight fight in which he had missed weight. His bout proceeded at a catchweight and he was fined 40% of his purse, which went to Bahamondes. He lost the bout via third round submission.

=== Post UFC ===
In his first appearance post-release, Rong faced Felipe Maia on October 20, 2022, at UAE Warriors 34. He won the bout via TKO in the second round.

Rong entered the Road to UFC tournament and faced Hong Seong-chan in the Lightweight Quarter-final on May 28, 2023, at Road to UFC Season 2: Episode 3, defeating him via first round TKO stoppage.

In the Semifinals, Rong faced Kim Sang-wook on August 27, 2023, at Road to UFC Season 2: Episode 6, winning the bout via unanimous decision.

Rong was scheduled to face Shin Haraguchi on December 9, 2023, at UFC Fight Night 233. However, they were pulled from this event due to the change of location. The bout eventually took place on February 4, 2024, at the UFC Apex. Rong won the fight via a rear-naked choke submission in the third round to become the Road to UFC 2 Lightweight champion.

=== Return to the UFC ===
Rong faced Chris Padilla on September 7, 2024 at UFC Fight Night 242. He lost the fight by technical knockout via doctor stoppage as a result of an elbow to the eye in the second round.

Rong faced Kody Steele via unanimous decision on February 9, 2025 at UFC 312. He won the fight by unanimous decision. This fight earned him a Fight of the Night award.

Rong faced former LFA Lightweight Champion Austin Hubbard on August 23, 2025 at UFC Fight Night 257. He won the fight via unanimous decision.

Rong was scheduled to face Quillan Salkilld on February 1, 2026 at UFC 325. However, Rong pulled out for unknown reasons and was replaced by Jamie Mullarkey.

Rong faced Victor Martinez on May 28, 2026 in the featured UFC bout at Road to UFC Season 5: Day 1. At the weigh-ins, Martinez weighed in at 158 pounds, two pounds over the weight non-title fight limit. The bout proceeded at catchweight and it is unclear what percent of his purse went to Rong. He won the fight by technical knockout in the first round.

Rong faced Rafa García on September 12, 2026, at UFC Fight Night 288. He won the fight by unanimous decision.

== Championships and accomplishments ==
=== Mixed martial arts ===
- Ultimate Fighting Championship
  - Fight of the Night (One time) vs. Kody Steele
  - Road to UFC Season 2 Lightweight Tournament Winner
- Wu Lin Feng
  - WLF Lightweight Championship (One time)
    - Three successful title defenses

== Mixed martial arts record ==
Professional record breakdown
| 35 matches | 29 wins | 6 losses |
| By knockout | 16 | 1 |
| By submission | 6 | 4 |
| By decision | 6 | 1 |
| By disqualification | 1 | 0 |

| Res. | Record | Opponent | Method | Event | Date | Round | Time | Location | Notes |
|---|---|---|---|---|---|---|---|---|---|
| Win | 29–6 | Rafa García | Decision (unanimous) | UFC Fight Night: Silva vs. Delgado | September 12, 2026 | 3 | 5:00 | Glendale, Arizona, United States | |
| Win | 28–6 | Victor Martinez | TKO (punches) | Road to UFC Season 5: Opening Round – Day 1 | May 28, 2026 | 1 | 1:10 | Macau SAR, China | Catchweight (158 lb) bout; Martinez missed weight. |
| Win | 27–6 | Austin Hubbard | Decision (unanimous) | UFC Fight Night: Walker vs. Zhang | August 23, 2025 | 3 | 5:00 | Shanghai, China | |
| Win | 26–6 | Kody Steele | Decision (unanimous) | UFC 312 | February 9, 2025 | 3 | 5:00 | Sydney, Australia | Fight of the Night. |
| Loss | 25–6 | Chris Padilla | TKO (doctor stoppage) | UFC Fight Night: Burns vs. Brady | September 7, 2024 | 2 | 4:14 | Las Vegas, Nevada, United States | |
| Win | 25–5 | Shin Haraguchi | Submission (rear-naked choke) | Road to UFC Season 2: Episode 7 | February 4, 2024 | 3 | 3:06 | Las Vegas, Nevada, United States | Won the Road to UFC Season 2 Lightweight Tournament. |
| Win | 24–5 | Kim Sang-wook | Decision (unanimous) | Road to UFC Season 2: Episode 6 | August 27, 2023 | 3 | 5:00 | Kallang, Singapore | Road to UFC Season 2 Lightweight Tournament Semifinal. |
| Win | 23–5 | Hong Seong-chan | TKO (punches) | Road to UFC Season 2: Episode 3 | May 28, 2023 | 1 | 2:17 | Shanghai, China | Road to UFC Season 2 Lightweight Tournament Quarterfinal. |
| Win | 22–5 | Felipe da Silva Maia | TKO (punches) | UAE Warriors 34 | October 20, 2022 | 2 | 1:59 | Abu Dhabi, United Arab Emirates | Catchweight (161 lb) bout. |
| Loss | 21–5 | Ignacio Bahamondes | Submission (brabo choke) | UFC Fight Night: Makhachev vs. Green | February 26, 2022 | 3 | 1:40 | Las Vegas, Nevada, United States | Catchweight (160 lb) bout; Rong missed weight. |
| Win | 21–4 | Brandon Jenkins | TKO (punches) | UFC Fight Night: Smith vs. Spann | September 18, 2021 | 3 | 4:35 | Las Vegas, Nevada, United States | Catchweight (158 lb) bout; Rong missed weight. |
| Loss | 20–4 | Kazula Vargas | Decision (unanimous) | UFC 261 | April 24, 2021 | 3 | 5:00 | Jacksonville, Florida, United States | |
| Win | 20–3 | Bi Deliya | TKO (punches) | WLF W.A.R.S. 50 | January 14, 2021 | 3 | 4:16 | Zhengzhou, China | Defended the WLF Lightweight Championship. |
| Win | 19–3 | Shayilan Nuerdanbieke | TKO (punches) | WLF W.A.R.S. 47 | September 25, 2020 | 1 | 2:05 | Zhengzhou, China | Defended the WLF Lightweight Championship. |
| Win | 18–3 | Han Jiaqiang | Submission (arm-triangle choke) | WLF W.A.R.S. 46 | August 21, 2020 | 1 | 2:01 | Zhengzhou, China | |
| Win | 17–3 | Huwanixi Wusikenbieke | KO (punches) | WLF W.A.R.S. 43 | May 22, 2020 | 1 | 1:47 | Zhengzhou, China | |
| Win | 16–3 | Alisson Barbosa | Decision (unanimous) | WLF W.A.R.S. 39 | October 18, 2019 | 5 | 5:00 | Zhengzhou, China | Defended the WLF Lightweight Championship. |
| Win | 15–3 | Mohsen Mohammadseifi | TKO (punches) | WLF W.A.R.S. 35 | June 14, 2019 | 1 | 2:50 | Zhengzhou, China | |
| Win | 14–3 | Marcio Andrade | Submission (rear-naked choke) | WLF W.A.R.S. 31 | January 3, 2019 | 5 | 3:49 | Zhengzhou, China | Won the WLF Lightweight Championship. |
| Win | 13–3 | Nikoloz Kajaia | Submission (guillotine choke) | WLF W.A.R.S. 27 | September 14, 2018 | 2 | 3:47 | Zhengzhou, China | |
| Win | 12–3 | Arben Escayo | TKO (injury) | ABA FC: Hongyuan | August 2, 2018 | 1 | 1:39 | Hongyuan County, China | |
| Win | 11–3 | Aleko Sagliani | TKO (shoulder injury) | WLF W.A.R.S. 25 | June 27, 2018 | 2 | 2:55 | Zhengzhou, China | |
| Win | 10–3 | Arsen Balyants | TKO (elbows and punches) | WLF W.A.R.S. 23 | April 14, 2018 | 3 | 0:55 | Zhengzhou, China | |
| Loss | 9–3 | Guilherme Cadena | Submission (triangle choke) | WLF W.A.R.S. 21 | January 13, 2018 | 1 | 3:32 | Zhengzhou, China | Catchweight (152 lb) bout. |
| Win | 9–2 | Takuma Watanabe | TKO (punches) | WLF W.A.R.S. 18 | October 27, 2017 | 1 | 3:42 | Maerkang, China | Catchweight (150 lb) bout. |
| Win | 8–2 | Vincenzo Tagliamonte | TKO (punches) | WLF W.A.R.S. 17 | September 16, 2017 | 1 | 4:44 | Zhengzhou, China | Lightweight debut. |
| Win | 7–2 | Ruslan Khairulin | TKO (punches) | WLF W.A.R.S. 15 | June 19, 2017 | 2 | 4:02 | Zhengzhou, China | Catchweight (150 lb) bout. |
| Loss | 6–2 | Wuliji Buren | Submission (rear-naked choke) | Chin Woo Men: 2016-2017 Season, Stage 7 | April 7, 2017 | 1 | 1:37 | Guangzhou, China | |
| Win | 6–1 | Shanati Shamaiti | Decision (unanimous) | Chin Woo Men: 2016-2017 Season, Stage 6 | February 18, 2017 | 3 | 5:00 | Guangzhou, China | |
| Win | 5–1 | Feng Kai Niu | Submission (armbar) | Chin Woo Men: 2016-2017 Season, Stage 4 | January 7, 2017 | 1 | 1:43 | Zhengzhou, China | Return to Featherweight. |
| Loss | 4–1 | Shamil Nasrudinov | Submission (guillotine choke) | WLF E.P.I.C. 9 | October 24, 2016 | 1 | 4:01 | Zhengzhou, China | Catchweight (141 lb) bout. |
| Win | 4–0 | Semen Galushko | TKO (punches) | WLF E.P.I.C. 6 | July 23, 2016 | 1 | 2:16 | Zhengzhou, China | |
| Win | 3–0 | Andrey Sapa | Technical Submission (guillotine choke) | WLF E.P.I.C. 4 | May 28, 2016 | 1 | 2:18 | Zhengzhou, China | Bantamweight debut. |
| Win | 2–0 | Vadim Hristoforov | TKO (punches) | WLF E.P.I.C. 3 | April 23, 2016 | 1 | 3:39 | Zhengzhou, China | |
| Win | 1–0 | Roman Lutsenko | DQ (punches to back of head) | Bullet Fly FC 4 | March 26, 2016 | 2 | 2:06 | Beijing, China | Featherweight debut. |

== See also ==
- List of current UFC fighters
- List of male mixed martial artists
