= UFC Performance Institute =

Athletic performance institute

- Interactive map of the UFC Performance Institute area
- Alternative names: UFC PI

General information
- Location: Enterprise, Nevada, U.S., 6650 S Torrey Pines Drive
- Coordinates: 36.0683°N 115.2317°W
- Opened: May 22, 2017
- Cost: $12 million
- Owner: TKO Group Holdings (Endeavor)

Technical details
- Floor area: 30,000 square feet (2,800 m^{2})

Website
- ufc.com/performance-institute

The UFC Performance Institute is the official mixed martial arts (MMA) training facility for American promotion Ultimate Fighting Championship (UFC), a division of TKO Group Holdings, a majority owned subsidiary of Endeavor Group Holdings. The building is located in Enterprise, Nevada, opposite the UFC Apex, and serves as the company headquarters.

== History ==
The Institute was opened in May 2017, and is the world's first mixed martial arts center for innovation, research and training.

As many as 400 MMA athletes have visited the center, as well as NFL, NBA, NHL and MLB athletes.

In June 2019, a second facility was opened in Shanghai, China. The official name of the facility is UFC Performance Institute Shanghai. It has been used to train athletes from China for the Olympic Games.

Two new facilities are proposed for Mexico and Nigeria.

UFC Performance Institute Mexico will open in Q4 2023.. It finally came into operation in February 2024.

== See also ==
- List of professional MMA training camps
- UFC Apex
- Ultimate Fighting Championship
