= UFC Fight Night: Moreno vs. Kavanagh =

2026 mixed martial arts event in Mexico City

- The poster for UFC Fight Night: Moreno vs. Kavanagh
- Promotion: Ultimate Fighting Championship
- Date: February 28, 2026
- Venue: Arena CDMX
- City: Mexico City, Mexico
- Attendance: 16,454
- Total gate: Not announced

Event chronology
UFC Fight Night: Strickland vs. Hernandez	UFC Fight Night: Moreno vs. Kavanagh	UFC 326: Holloway vs. Oliveira 2

UFC Fight Night: Moreno vs. Kavanagh (also known as UFC Fight Night 268) was a mixed martial arts event produced by the Ultimate Fighting Championship that took place on February 28, 2026, at the Arena CDMX in Mexico City, Mexico.

== Background ==
The event marked the promotion's eighth visit to Mexico City and first since UFC on ESPN: Moreno vs. Erceg in March 2025.

A flyweight bout between former two-time UFC Flyweight Champion Brandon Moreno (also former LFA Flyweight Champion) and Asu Almabayev was scheduled to headline the event. However, Almabayev withdrew due to a hand injury and was replaced by Lone'er Kavanagh. Kavanagh had been scheduled to face Bruno Gustavo da Silva at UFC Fight Night: Emmett vs. Vallejos two weeks later, but pulled out of that matchup to step in as the new headliner.

A women's flyweight bout between Ernesta Kareckaitė and promotional newcomer Sofia Montenegro was originally scheduled for this event. However, Montenegro withdrew for undisclosed reasons and was replaced by fellow newcomer Regina Tarín, with the matchup took place at a 130‑pound catchweight.

== Results ==
Main card (Paramount+)
Weight class				Method	Round	Time	Notes
Flyweight	Lone'er Kavanagh	def.	Brandon Moreno	Decision (unanimous) (49–46, 48–47, 48–47)	5	5:00
Bantamweight	David Martínez	def.	Marlon Vera	Decision (unanimous) (29–28, 29–28, 29–28)	3	5:00
Lightweight	King Green	def.	Daniel Zellhuber	TKO (punches)	2	4:55
Flyweight	Édgar Cháirez	def.	Felipe Bunes	Decision (split) (29–28, 28–29, 29–28)	3	5:00
Flyweight	Imanol Rodríguez	def.	Kevin Borjas	TKO (punches)	2	4:21
Bantamweight	Santiago Luna	def.	Angel Pacheco	Decision (unanimous) (30–27, 30–27, 30–27)	3	5:00
Preliminary card (Paramount+)
Middleweight	Ryan Gandra	def.	José Medina	TKO (punches)	1	0:41
Women's Bantamweight	Ailín Pérez	def.	Macy Chiasson	Decision (unanimous) (29–28, 29–28, 29–28)	3	5:00
Bantamweight	Cristian Quiñónez	def.	Kris Moutinho	Decision (unanimous) (30–27, 30–27, 30–27)	3	5:00
Featherweight	Javier Reyes	def.	Douglas Silva de Andrade	TKO (punches)	1	4:59
Catchweight (130 lb)	Regina Tarín	def.	Ernesta Kareckaitė	Decision (unanimous) (30–27, 30–27, 29–28)	3	5:00
Featherweight	Francis Marshall	def.	Erik Silva	Submission (rear-naked choke)	1	2:29
Middleweight	Damian Pinas	def.	Wesley Schultz	TKO (punches)	1	2:30

== Bonus awards ==
The following fighters received $100,000 bonuses. The other finishes received $25,000 additional bonuses.

- Fight of the Night: Regina Tarin vs. Ernesta Kareckaitė
- Performance of the Night: Lone'er Kavanagh and Imanol Rodríguez

== See also ==
- 2026 in UFC
- List of current UFC fighters
- List of UFC events
