= Asu Almabayev =

Kazakh mixed martial artist (born 1994)

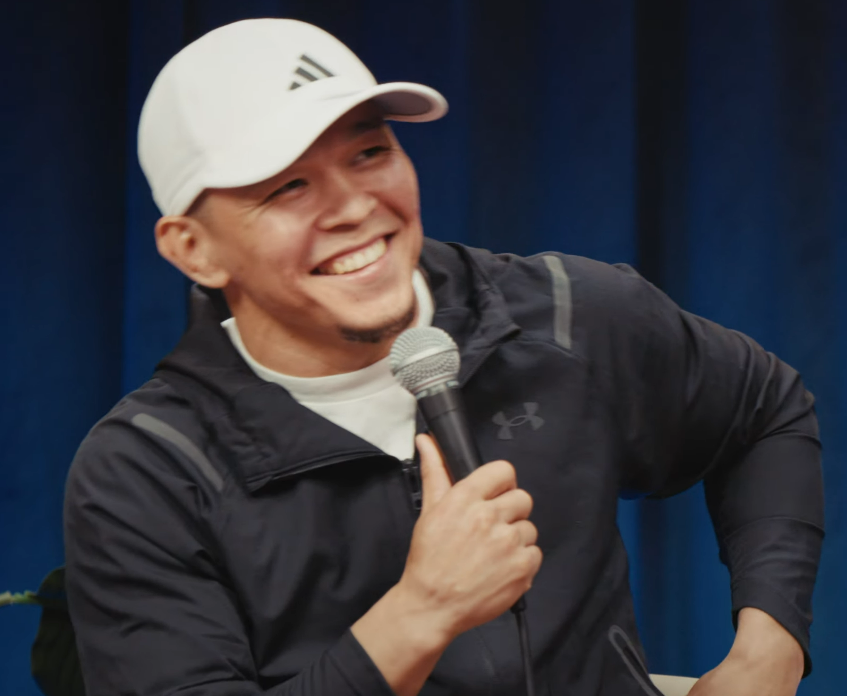
- Almabayev in 2026
- Born: Asu Abaiuly Almabayev; January 25, 1994 (age 32); Janatalap, Sarysu District, Kazakhstan
- Native name: Асу Абайұлы Алмабаев
- Nickname: Zulfikar
- Height: 5 ft 4 in (1.63 m)
- Weight: 125 lb (57 kg; 8 st 13 lb)
- Division: Flyweight
- Reach: 65 in (165 cm)
- Stance: Orthodox
- Fighting out of: Almaty, Kazakhstan
- Team: DAR Pro Team
- Years active: 2013–present

Mixed martial arts record
- Total: 28
- Wins: 24
- By knockout: 3
- By submission: 11
- By decision: 10
- Losses: 4
- By knockout: 2
- By decision: 2

Other information
- Mixed martial arts record from Sherdog

Asu Abaiuly Almabayev (Kazakh: Асу Абайұлы Алмабаев; born January 25, 1994) is a Kazakh professional mixed martial artist. He currently competes in the Flyweight division of the Ultimate Fighting Championship (UFC). A professional since 2013, Almabayev has also competed in M-1 Global, where he is a former Interim M-1 Global Flyweight Champion. As of October 24, 2026, he is #6 in the Meta UFC flyweight rankings.

== Background ==
Almabayev was born on January 25, 1994, in the village of Janatalap in the Sarysu District of the Jambyl Region of Kazakhstan. He was raised by his grandparents until he was ten. At the age of five, he began to train wrestling. When he was in the fifth grade, he and his family moved to Almaty, where he attended other combat sport classes such as karate, boxing, and Brazilian jiu-jitsu. While in Almaty, Almabayev worked at a market, where his parents had a small shop. He worked at the market until he was 23. In BJJ, Almabayev became the champion of Kazakhstan and Asia. However, he eventually chose to compete in mixed martial arts after watching it on television while studying in college.

== Mixed martial arts career ==
=== Early career ===
Almabayev made his professional MMA debut against Vadim Buseev on June 1, 2013, at Rod Fighting: Shield and Sword 4. He won the bout via unanimous decision.

After a three-year layoff, Almabayev returned in 2016 and won three early victories in the Alash Pride FC, Tech-Krep FC and Fight Nights Global promotions. In 2017, he suffered his first defeat at Fight Nights Global 58, losing to current UFC fighter Tagir Ulanbekov. Two months later, Almabayev returned to the cage at the Alash Pride FC tournament and suffered a second defeat, losing to Mehman Mamedov. Almabayev won his next thirteen fights in a row in the ACB, Alash Pride, Fight Nights Global, Naiza, M-1 Global and Brave Combat Federation organizations.

=== M-1 Global ===
Almabayev faced Chris Kelades on October 19, 2019, at M-1 Challenge 105 for the Interim M-1 Global Flyweight Championship. He won the bout via unanimous decision.

=== Brave Combat Federation ===
Almabayev made his Brave Combat Federation debut on August 21, 2021, against Aleksander Doskalchuk at Brave CF 53. He won the bout via a rear-naked choke submission in the second round.

Almabayev faced Imram Magaramov on March 11, 2022, at Brave CF 57. He won the bout via unanimous decision.

Almabayev faced Zach Makovsky on July 30, 2022, at Brave CF 60. He won the bout via split decision.

Almabayev faced Kenneth Maningat on November 26, 2022, at Brave CF 66. He won via a rear-naked choke submission in the second round.

=== Ultimate Fighting Championship ===
Almabayev made his UFC debut against Ode' Osbourne on August 5, 2023, at UFC on ESPN 50. He won the bout via a rear-naked choke submission in the second round. This fight earned him the Performance of the Night award.

Almabayev faced C.J. Vergara on March 9, 2024, at UFC 299. At the weigh ins, Vergara weighed in at 127 pounds, one pound over the flyweight non-title fight limit, which led the bout to proceed at catchweight with 30 percent of Vergara's purse going to Almabayev. He won the bout via unanimous decision.

Almabayev faced Jose Johnson on June 15, 2024, at UFC on ESPN 58. He won the bout via unanimous decision.

Almabayev faced Matheus Nicolau on October 19, 2024, at UFC Fight Night 245. He won the fight by unanimous decision.

Almabayev was scheduled to face Steve Erceg on March 1, 2025, at UFC Fight Night 253. However, Erceg was moved to headline UFC on ESPN 64 and was replaced by Allan Nascimento. However, Almabayev's opponent was changed to Manel Kape due to the injury of Kape's original opponent Brandon Royval, and the bout headlined UFC Fight Night 253. During the fight, Almabayev tried to protest an eye poke but after the referee did not notice it, this led to the finishing sequence which led Kape to win the bout by technical knockout in the third round.

Almabayev was scheduled to face Ramazan Temirov July 26, 2025, at UFC on ABC 9. However, Temirov pulled out due to failing a drug test in early July and was replaced by Jose Ochoa. Almabayev defeated Ochoa by unanimous decision.

Almabaev faced former UFC Flyweight Championship challenger Alex Perez on November 22, 2025, at UFC Fight Night 265. He won the fight via a guillotine choke submission in the third round.

Almabayev was scheduled to face Brandon Moreno in the main event on February 28, 2026, at UFC Fight Night 268. However, Almabayev withdrew due to a hand injury and was replaced by Lone'er Kavanagh.

Almabayev faced Charles Johnson on June 27, 2026 at UFC Fight Night 280. He won the fight via a Suloev submission in the third round. This fight earned him a $100,000 Performance of the Night award.

Almabaev faced former RIZIN Flyweight and Bantamweight Champion (also former Bellator Bantamweight Champion) Kyoji Horiguchi on November 21, 2026 at UFC Fight Night 294. He lost the fight by unanimous decision.

== Championships and accomplishments ==
=== Mixed martial arts ===
- Ultimate Fighting Championship
  - Performance of the Night (Two times) vs. Ode' Osbourne and Charles Johnson
- M-1 Global
  - Interim M-1 Flyweight Championship (One time)

== Mixed martial arts record ==
Professional record breakdown
28 matches	24 wins	4 losses
By knockout	3	2
By submission	11	0
By decision	10	2

Res.	Record	Opponent	Method	Event	Date	Round	Time	Location	Notes
Loss	24–4	Kyoji Horiguchi	Decision (unanimous)	UFC Fight Night: Procházka vs. Stirling	November 21, 2026	3	5:00	Al Rayyan, Qatar	
Win	24–3	Charles Johnson	Submission (hamstring stretch)	UFC Fight Night: Fiziev vs. Torres	June 27, 2026	3	3:33	Baku, Azerbaijan	Performance of the Night.
Win	23–3	Alex Perez	Submission (flying guillotine choke)	UFC Fight Night: Tsarukyan vs. Hooker	November 22, 2025	3	0:22	Al Rayyan, Qatar	
Win	22–3	Jose Ochoa	Decision (unanimous)	UFC on ABC: Whittaker vs. de Ridder	July 26, 2025	3	5:00	Abu Dhabi, United Arab Emirates	
Loss	21–3	Manel Kape	TKO (retirement)	UFC Fight Night: Kape vs. Almabayev	March 1, 2025	3	2:16	Las Vegas, Nevada, United States	
Win	21–2	Matheus Nicolau	Decision (unanimous)	UFC Fight Night: Hernandez vs. Pereira	October 19, 2024	3	5:00	Las Vegas, Nevada, United States	
Win	20–2	Jose Johnson	Decision (unanimous)	UFC on ESPN: Perez vs. Taira	June 15, 2024	3	5:00	Las Vegas, Nevada, United States	
Win	19–2	C.J. Vergara	Decision (unanimous)	UFC 299	March 9, 2024	3	5:00	Miami, Florida, United States	Catchweight (127 lb) bout; Vergara missed weight.
Win	18–2	Ode' Osbourne	Submission (rear-naked choke)	UFC on ESPN: Sandhagen vs. Font	August 5, 2023	2	3:11	Nashville, Tennessee, United States	Performance of the Night.
Win	17–2	Kenneth Maningat	Submission (rear-naked choke)	Brave CF 66	November 26, 2022	2	3:30	Bali, Indonesia	
Win	16–2	Zach Makovsky	Decision (split)	Brave CF 60	July 30, 2022	3	5:00	Isa Town, Bahrain	
Win	15–2	Imram Magaramov	Decision (unanimous)	Brave CF 57	March 11, 2022	3	5:00	Isa Town, Bahrain	
Win	14–2	Kayck Alencar	KO (punch)	Naiza FC 36	December 29, 2021	3	0:27	Almaty, Kazakhstan	
Win	13–2	Aleksander Doskalchuk	Submission (rear-naked choke)	Brave CF 53	August 21, 2021	2	3:47	Almaty, Kazakhstan	
Win	12–2	Darkhan Skakov	Submission (rear-naked choke)	Naiza FC 27	December 24, 2020	1	3:29	Almaty, Kazakhstan	Won the vacant Naiza FC Flyweight Championship.
Win	11–2	Chris Kelades	Decision (unanimous)	M-1 Challenge 105	October 19, 2019	5	5:00	Nur-Sultan, Kazakhstan	Won the interim M-1 Global Flyweight Championship.
Win	10–2	Pierre Ludet	Submission (guillotine choke)	M-1 Challenge 101	March 30, 2019	2	1:45	Almaty, Kazakhstan	
Win	9–2	Kiril Fomenkov	Submission (rear-naked choke)	M-1 Challenge 100	December 15, 2018	2	3:51	Atyrau, Kazakhstan	
Win	8–2	Saud Karagishov	TKO (punches)	Fight Nights Global 88	August 31, 2018	2	4:09	Astana, Kazakhstan	Catchweight (130 lb) bout; Karagishov missed weight.
Win	7–2	Shamil Akhmaev	Decision (unanimous)	Berkut Young Eagles 4	April 29, 2018	3	5:00	Tolstoy-Yurt, Russia	
Win	6–2	Kenan Jafarli	Decision (unanimous)	Alash Pride FC: Almaty Arena	December 30, 2017	2	5:00	Almaty, Kazakhstan	
Win	5–2	Ibrahim Mamaev	Submission (Peruvian necktie)	ACB 69	September 9, 2017	2	2:07	Almaty, Kazakhstan	
Loss	4–2	Mehman Mamedov	Decision (unanimous)	Alash Pride FC: Alash Aibary	April 1, 2017	3	5:00	Almaty, Kazakhstan	
Loss	4–1	Tagir Ulanbekov	TKO (submission to punches)	Fight Nights Global 58	January 28, 2017	3	4:51	Kaspiysk, Russia	
Win	4–0	Galamirza Ayvazov	Submission (armbar)	Fight Nights Global 45	April 22, 2016	1	3:41	Ufa, Russia	Catchweight (130 lb) bout.
Win	3–0	Oleg Erik	Submission (rear-naked choke)	Tech-Krep FC: Southern Front 3	March 3, 2016	1	4:04	Krasnodar, Russia	
Win	2–0	Yeldos Kaliev	TKO (punches)	Alash Pride FC: Selection 13	February 14, 2016	1	4:32	Kaskelen, Kazakhstan	Flyweight debut.
Win	1–0	Vadim Buseev	Decision (unanimous)	R.O.D: Shield and Sword 4	June 1, 2013	3	5:00	Moscow, Russia	Bantamweight debut.

== See also ==
- List of current UFC fighters
- List of male mixed martial artists
