= Bruno Gustavo da Silva =

Brazilian mixed martial artist (born 1990)

Bruno Gustavo
- Born: Bruno Gustavo Aparecido da Silva; 16 March 1990 (age 36); Piracicaba, São Paulo, Brazil
- Other names: Bulldog
- Height: 5 ft 4 in (1.63 m)
- Weight: 125.5 lb (57 kg; 9 st 0 lb)
- Division: Bantamweight (2015–2020); Flyweight (2013–2015, 2017–2018, 2020–present)
- Reach: 65 in (165 cm)
- Fighting out of: Coconut Creek, Florida, U.S.
- Team: Black House (2012–2015); Fight Ready MMA (2015–2024); American Top Team (2024–present)
- Rank: Black belt in Brazilian jiu-jitsu under Felipe Vidal
- Years active: 2011–present

Mixed martial arts record
- Total: 27
- Wins: 15
- By knockout: 6
- By submission: 5
- By decision: 4
- Losses: 9
- By knockout: 3
- By submission: 2
- By decision: 4
- Draws: 2
- No contests: 1

Other information
- Mixed martial arts record from Sherdog

Bruno Gustavo Aparecido da Silva (born 16 March 1990) is a Brazilian mixed martial artist who competes in the Flyweight division of the Ultimate Fighting Championship (UFC).

== Background ==
Silva was born and grew up in the neighbourhoods of Piracicaba, Brazil, with one sister and one brother. Playing various sports in his childhood, Silva dabbled in martial arts by training in capoeira around the age of ten. Eventually, at the age of 19, he started training mixed martial arts.

== Mixed martial arts career ==
=== Early career ===
Starting his career in 2011, Silva racked up a 7–2–1 record in his native Brazil before trying out for The Ultimate Fighter: Brazil 4 in late 2014.

=== TUF Brazil 4 ===
In the preliminary bout for the season, Silva faced Gustavo Sedório. Silva won the fight via first-round technical knockout due to a jaw injury Sedório suffered.

In the quarterfinals, Silva faced Dileno Lopes. Silva lost the bout via first-round submission and was eliminated from the tournament.

=== Post-TUF career ===
After the season, Silva moved to Arizona in 2015 in order to train at Fight Ready MMA. He competed mostly in the United States, racking up 3–1–1 with his most memorable fights being winning the World Fighting Federation Flyweight title and also a draw against fellow future UFC fighter, Casey Kenney at LFA 11.

=== Ultimate Fighting Championship ===
Silva was scheduled to face Khalid Taha on 7 September 2019, at UFC 242. However, on 21 August, it was reported that the bout was moved to UFC 243. He lost the fight via submission in round three. On 23 December 2019, Taha received a one-year USADA suspension for tested positive for furosemide (diuretics) in an in-competition urine sample provided on 6 October 2019 where Taha took a medicine for reducing inflammation and swelling in his eyes which contained furosemide. The fight was ruled a no-contest.

Silva was scheduled to face Su Mudaerji in a flyweight bout at UFC Fight Night 170 on 14 March 2020. However, due to the COVID-19 pandemic in mainland China, Mudaerji was forced to withdraw from the event as he would not travel to prepare for the fight and was replaced by promotional newcomer David Dvořák. He lost the fight via unanimous decision.

Silva was scheduled to face Tagir Ulanbekov on 12 September 2020, at UFC Fight Night 177. However, due to travel restrictions related to the COVID-19 pandemic, the pairing was rescheduled and took place four weeks later at UFC Fight Night 179. He lost the fight by unanimous decision.

As the last fight of his prevailing contract, Silva faced JP Buys on 20 March 2021, at UFC on ESPN 21. After knocking Buys down multiple times during the bout, da Silva won the bout via technical knockout in the second round. This win earned him the Performance of the Night award.

Silva signed a new, four-fight deal with the organisation.

Silva, replacing Denys Bondar, faced Victor Rodriguez on 22 May 2021, at UFC Fight Night 188. He won the fight via knockout a minute into the first round. This win earned him the Performance of the Night award.

Silva faced Tyson Nam on 11 March 2023, at UFC Fight Night 221. He won the fight via technical submission due to a rear-naked choke in round two. This win earned him the Performance of the Night award.

Silva was scheduled to face Cody Durden on 23 September 2023, at UFC Fight Night 228. However, the bout was cancelled because Durden filled in to face Jake Hadley at UFC on ESPN: Sandhagen vs. Font as a result of the withdrawal of Hadley's original opponent. Durden and Silva faced each other on 20 July 2024, at UFC on ESPN 60. Silva won the fight by technical knockout in the second round. This fight earned him another Performance of the Night award.

Silva faced former RIZIN Bantamweight Champion Manel Kape on 14 December 2024 at UFC on ESPN 63. Despite delivering three low-blows resulting in a point deduction for Silva, Silva ended up losing the fight by technical knockout via a body kick and punches in the third round.

Silva was scheduled to face Joshua Van on 8 March 2025, at UFC 313. However, Silva pulled out due to an injury and was replaced by Road to UFC Season 2 flyweight winner Rei Tsuruya. The bout was rescheduled and took place on 7 June 2025 at UFC 316. Silva lost the fight by technical knockout late into the third round.

Silva faced Park Hyun-sung on 18 October 2025 at UFC Fight Night 262. He won the fight via a rear-naked choke submission in the third round.

Silva was scheduled to face Lone'er Kavanagh on 14 March 2026, at UFC Fight Night 269. However, Kavanagh withdrew from the bout to headline UFC Fight Night 268. Former LFA Flyweight Champion Charles Johnson stepped in as a replacement to face Silva. Silva lost the fight by split decision.

Silva faced Édgar Cháirez on 6 June 2026 at UFC Fight Night 278. He lost the fight via a rear-naked choke submission in the first round.

Silva is scheduled to face Jafel Filho on December 5, 2026, at UFC Fight Night 295.

== Championships and accomplishments ==
- Ultimate Fighting Championship
  - Performance of the Night (Four times) vs. JP Buys, Victor Rodriguez, Tyson Nam, and Cody Durden
  - Tied (John Lineker) for fifth most knockdowns in UFC Flyweight division history (7)
- World Fighting Federation
  - WFF Flyweight Championship (One time)

== Mixed martial arts record ==
Professional record breakdown
27 matches	15 wins	9 losses
By knockout	6	3
By submission	5	2
By decision	4	4
Draws	2	
No contests	1	

Res.	Record	Opponent	Method	Event	Date	Round	Time	Location	Notes
Loss	15–9–2 (1)	Édgar Cháirez	Submission (rear-naked choke)	UFC Fight Night: Muhammad vs. Bonfim	6 June 2026	1	4:13	Las Vegas, Nevada, United States	
Loss	15–8–2 (1)	Charles Johnson	Decision (split)	UFC Fight Night: Emmett vs. Vallejos	14 March 2026	3	5:00	Las Vegas, Nevada, United States	
Win	15–7–2 (1)	Park Hyun-sung	Submission (rear-naked choke)	UFC Fight Night: de Ridder vs. Allen	18 October 2025	3	2:15	Vancouver, British Columbia, Canada	
Loss	14–7–2 (1)	Joshua Van	TKO (punches)	UFC 316	7 June 2025	3	4:01	Newark, New Jersey, United States	
Loss	14–6–2 (1)	Manel Kape	TKO (body kick and punches)	UFC on ESPN: Covington vs. Buckley	14 December 2024	3	1:57	Tampa, Florida, United States	Silva was deducted one point in round 2 due to a groin strike.
Win	14–5–2 (1)	Cody Durden	TKO (punches)	UFC on ESPN: Lemos vs. Jandiroba	20 July 2024	2	2:58	Las Vegas, Nevada, United States	Performance of the Night.
Win	13–5–2 (1)	Tyson Nam	Technical Submission (rear-naked choke)	UFC Fight Night: Yan vs. Dvalishvili	11 March 2023	2	1:23	Las Vegas, Nevada, United States	Performance of the Night.
Win	12–5–2 (1)	Victor Rodriguez	KO (punches)	UFC Fight Night: Font vs. Garbrandt	22 May 2021	1	1:00	Las Vegas, Nevada, United States	Performance of the Night.
Win	11–5–2 (1)	JP Buys	TKO (punches)	UFC on ESPN: Brunson vs. Holland	20 March 2021	2	2:56	Las Vegas, Nevada, United States	Performance of the Night.
Loss	10–5–2 (1)	Tagir Ulanbekov	Decision (unanimous)	UFC Fight Night: Moraes vs. Sandhagen	11 October 2020	3	5:00	Abu Dhabi, United Arab Emirates	
Loss	10–4–2 (1)	David Dvořák	Decision (unanimous)	UFC Fight Night: Lee vs. Oliveira	14 March 2020	3	5:00	Brasília, Brazil	Return to Flyweight.
NC	10–3–2 (1)	Khalid Taha	NC (overturned)	UFC 243	6 October 2019	3	3:00	Melbourne, Australia	Bantamweight bout; Taha missed weight (137 lb). Originally a submission (arm-triangle choke) win for Taha; overturned after he tested positive for furosemide.
Win	10–3–2	Ralph Acosta	Decision (unanimous)	World Fighting Federation 40	15 December 2018	3	5:00	Chandler, Arizona, United States	Won the WFF Flyweight Championship.
Win	9–3–2	Joe Madrid	TKO (punches)	World Fighting Federation 35	19 August 2017	1	4:23	Chandler, Arizona, United States	Bantamweight bout.
Draw	8–3–2	Casey Kenney	Draw (split)	LFA 11	5 May 2017	3	5:00	Phoenix, Arizona, United States	
Loss	8–3–1	Adalto Prado	KO (head kick)	Aspera FC 44	10 September 2016	1	0:07	São Pedro, Brazil	Bantamweight bout.
Win	8–2–1	Matt Betzold	Decision (split)	World Fighting Federation 25	7 November 2015	3	5:00	Chandler, Arizona, United States	
Win	7–2–1	Heider Prais	Submission (rear-naked choke)	Team Nogueira: MMA Fight Live	4 September 2014	3	3:23	Rio de Janeiro, Brazil	
Win	6–2–1	Sóslenis Carvalho	Submission (rear-naked choke)	Talent MMA Circuit 8	12 April 2014	3	4:33	Valinhos, Brazil	
Win	5–2–1	Júlio Cesar Moraes	KO (spinning wheel kick)	Team Nogueira: MMA Circuit 4	5 November 2013	3	0:00	Rio de Janeiro, Brazil	
Win	4–2–1	Atila Oliveira	Decision (unanimous)	MMA Challenge: Ponte Preta	20 September 2012	3	5:00	Campinas, Brazil	
Draw	3–2–1	Yury Valenzuela	Draw (majority)	Encontro Fight 2	27 July 2012	3	5:00	Santa Bárbara d'Oeste, Brazil	
Loss	3–2	Wesley Batista	Decision (unanimous)	Corumbatai Fight	14 July 2012	3	5:00	Corumbataí, Brazil	
Win	3–1	James Carvalho	TKO (doctor stoppage)	Arena Fight Uberlandia 4	10 December 2011	1	5:00	Uberlândia, Brazil	
Loss	2–1	Rodrigo Marcos	Submission (armbar)	Hombres de Honor 29	24 September 2011	3	0:22	Sorocaba, Brazil	
Win	2–0	Renato Higen Carriel	Decision (unanimous)	Circuito MMA Kyokushinkaikan 2	4 June 2011	3	5:00	Sorocaba, Brazil	
Win	1–0	Paulo Magueta	Submission	Circuito MMA Kyokushinkaikan 1	6 February 2011	1	1:31	Sorocaba, Brazil	

== Mixed martial arts exhibition record ==
Professional record breakdown
2 matches	1 win	1 loss
By knockout	1	0
By submission	0	1
By decision	0	0

Res.	Record	Opponent	Method	Event	Date	Round	Time	Location	Notes
Loss	1–1	Dileno Lopes	Submission (guillotine choke)	The Ultimate Fighter: Brazil 4	13 February 2015 (airdate)	1	1:05	Las Vegas, Nevada, United States	The Ultimate Fighter: Brazil 4 Quarterfinals round
Win	1–0	Gustavo Sedório	TKO (jaw injury)	The Ultimate Fighter: Brazil 4	2 February 2015 (airdate)	1	5:00	Las Vegas, Nevada, United States	The Ultimate Fighter: Brazil 4 Entry round

== See also ==
- List of current UFC fighters
- List of male mixed martial artists
