= Charles Johnson (fighter) =

American mixed martial artist (born 1991)

- Born: Charles Anthony Johnson; January 10, 1991 (age 35); Topeka, Kansas, U.S.
- Other names: InnerG
- Height: 5 ft 9 in (1.75 m)
- Weight: 125 lb (57 kg; 8 st 13 lb)
- Division: Flyweight (2017–present); Bantamweight (2016, 2018)
- Reach: 70 in (178 cm)
- Fighting out of: St. Louis, Missouri, U.S.
- Team: Murcielago MMA
- Rank: Blue belt in Brazilian Jiu-Jitsu
- Years active: 2016–present

Professional boxing record
- Total: 10
- Wins: 1
- By knockout: 1
- Losses: 5
- By knockout: 1
- Draws: 4

Mixed martial arts record
- Total: 29
- Wins: 20
- By knockout: 8
- By submission: 4
- By decision: 8
- Losses: 9
- By knockout: 1
- By submission: 1
- By decision: 7

Other information
- Boxing record from BoxRec
- Mixed martial arts record from Sherdog

Charles Anthony Johnson (born January 10, 1991) is an American mixed martial artist and former professional boxer who currently competes in the Flyweight division of the Ultimate Fighting Championship (UFC). He is a former Legacy Fighting Alliance (LFA) flyweight champion. As of October 3, 2026, he is #15 in the Meta UFC flyweight rankings.

== Background ==
Johnson was born in Topeka, Kansas, and moved to St. Louis, Missouri, at the age of four. He attended Hazelwood East High School, where he received All-State honors in wrestling, cross country, long distance running, and sprinting, and was competing in the state championships in American football. After high school, Johnson attended Arkansas-Pine Bluff and Southeast Missouri State University, where he continued to compete in track and field.

== Mixed martial arts career ==
=== Early career ===
Starting his professional career in 2016, Johnson fought under various promotions, most notably Legacy Fighting Alliance.

On July 2, 2021, Johnson faced Yuma Horiuchi in the LFA flyweight interim championship match at LFA 110, winning the title by split decision in 5 rounds.

On August 27, 2021, Johnson faced challenger Juan Camilo in the LFA flyweight title match at LFA 114, winning by TKO in the second round with punches. He successfully defended the interim title for the first time, and after the match, regular champion Victor Altamirano moved to UFC, and Johnson was recognized as the regular champion.

On January 21, 2021, Johnson faced challenger Carlos Mota in the LFA flyweight title match at LFA 122, fighting a fierce battle and winning by TKO with a right straight in the fifth round. He successfully defended the title for the first time.

=== Ultimate Fighting Championship ===
Johnson made his UFC debut against Muhammad Mokaev on July 23, 2022, at UFC Fight Night 212. He lost the fight via unanimous decision.

Johnson faced Zhalgas Zhumagulov at UFC Fight Night 215. He won the fight via split decision. 12 out of 13 media outlets scored the fight in favor of Zhumagulov.

Johnson faced Jimmy Flick on January 14, 2023, UFC Fight Night 217. He won the fight via technical knockout in the first round.

Johnson faced Ode' Osbourne on February 25, 2023, at UFC Fight Night 220. He lost the fight via split decision.

Johnson faced Cody Durden on April 29, 2023, at UFC on ESPN 45. He lost the fight via unanimous decision.

Johnson faced Rafael Estevam on November 18, 2023, at UFC Fight Night 232. He lost the fight by unanimous decision.

Johnson faced Azat Maksum on February 3, 2024 at UFC Fight Night 235, replacing Nate Maness on that bout. He won the fight by unanimous decision. This fight earned him his first Fight of the Night award.

In his next fight, he faced Jake Hadley on May 11, 2024, at UFC on ESPN 56. He won the fight via unanimous decision.

Johnson faced Joshua Van on July 13, 2024, at UFC on ESPN 59. He won the bout by knockout in the third round. This earned him his first Performance of the Night award.

Johnson faced Su Mudaerji on October 19, 2024 at UFC Fight Night 245. He won the fight by unanimous decision.

Johnson faced Ramazan Temirov on March 1, 2025 at UFC Fight Night 253. He lost the fight by unanimous decision.

Johnson faced Lone'er Kavanagh on August 23, 2025 at UFC Fight Night 257. He won the fight via knockout in round two. This fight earned him another Performance of the Night award.

Johnson faced Alex Perez on January 24, 2026, at UFC 324. Perez weighed in at 128.5 pounds, two and a half pounds over the flyweight non-title fight limit. As a result, the bout proceeded at catchweight, and Perez was fined 25 percent of his purse, which was awarded to Johnson. He lost the fight via technical knockout in round one.

Johnson faced Bruno Gustavo da Silva on March 14, 2026 at UFC Fight Night 269. He won the fight by split decision.

Johnson faced Asu Almabayev on June 27, 2026 at UFC Fight Night 280. He lost the fight via a Suloev submission in the third round.

Johnson was scheduled to face Jose Ochoa on August 15, 2026 at UFC 330. However, Ochoa pulled out for undisclosed reasons three days before the event and was replaced by promotional newcomer and former LFA Flyweight Champion Eduardo Henrique in a 130 pound catchweight bout. Johnson defeated Henrique via a rare scottish twister submission in the third round. This fight earned him a $100,000 Performance of the Night award.

Johnson is scheduled to face Brandon Moreno on December 12, 2026, at UFC 335.

== Personal life ==
Johnson has a wife named Caitlin. Together they have two children, a daughter named Gia and a son named Sy. Johnson found out that he was going to be a "girl dad" while in the octagon, his team sharing the information with him immediately after his win over Jimmy Flick. Johnson has since embraced the label, and often brings Gia to ceremonial weigh-ins and media events.

Johnson has been a fan of comics and anime since his teenage years, and describes Spider-Man and One Piece as particular favorites. He is also a fan of Yu-Gi-Oh!, and has multiple Yu-Gi-Oh! themed tattoos.

== Championships and accomplishments ==
=== Mixed martial arts ===
- Ultimate Fighting Championship
  - Fight of the Night (One time) vs. Azat Maksum
  - Performance of the Night (Three times) vs. Joshua Van, Lone'er Kavanagh and Eduardo Henrique
- Legacy Fighting Alliance
  - LFA Flyweight Champion (One time)
- MMA Fighting
  - 2024 Second Team MMA All-Star

== Mixed martial arts record ==
Professional record breakdown
29 matches	20 wins	9 losses
By knockout	8	1
By submission	4	1
By decision	8	7

Res.	Record	Opponent	Method	Event	Date	Round	Time	Location	Notes
Win	20–9	Eduardo Henrique	Submission (twister)	UFC 330	August 15, 2026	3	1:36	Philadelphia, Pennsylvania, United States	Catchweight (130 lb) bout. Henrique was deducted one point in round 1 due to an illegal knee. Performance of the Night.
Loss	19–9	Asu Almabayev	Submission (hamstring stretch)	UFC Fight Night: Fiziev vs. Torres	June 27, 2026	3	3:33	Baku, Azerbaijan	
Win	19–8	Bruno Gustavo da Silva	Decision (split)	UFC Fight Night: Emmett vs. Vallejos	March 14, 2026	3	5:00	Las Vegas, Nevada, United States	
Loss	18–8	Alex Perez	TKO (punches)	UFC 324	January 24, 2026	1	3:16	Las Vegas, Nevada, United States	Catchweight (128.5 lb) bout; Perez missed weight.
Win	18–7	Lone'er Kavanagh	KO (punch)	UFC Fight Night: Walker vs. Zhang	August 23, 2025	2	4:35	Shanghai, China	Performance of the Night.
Loss	17–7	Ramazan Temirov	Decision (unanimous)	UFC Fight Night: Kape vs. Almabayev	March 1, 2025	3	5:00	Las Vegas, Nevada, United States	
Win	17–6	Su Mudaerji	Decision (unanimous)	UFC Fight Night: Hernandez vs. Pereira	October 19, 2024	3	5:00	Las Vegas, Nevada, United States	
Win	16–6	Joshua Van	KO (punches)	UFC on ESPN: Namajunas vs. Cortez	July 13, 2024	3	0:20	Denver, Colorado, United States	Performance of the Night.
Win	15–6	Jake Hadley	Decision (unanimous)	UFC on ESPN: Lewis vs. Nascimento	May 11, 2024	3	5:00	St. Louis, Missouri, United States	
Win	14–6	Azat Maksum	Decision (unanimous)	UFC Fight Night: Dolidze vs. Imavov	February 3, 2024	3	5:00	Las Vegas, Nevada, United States	Fight of the Night.
Loss	13–6	Rafael Estevam	Decision (unanimous)	UFC Fight Night: Allen vs. Craig	November 18, 2023	3	5:00	Las Vegas, Nevada, United States	Catchweight (128 lb) bout; Estevam missed weight.
Loss	13–5	Cody Durden	Decision (unanimous)	UFC on ESPN: Song vs. Simón	April 29, 2023	3	5:00	Las Vegas, Nevada, United States	
Loss	13–4	Ode' Osbourne	Decision (split)	UFC Fight Night: Muniz vs. Allen	February 25, 2023	3	5:00	Las Vegas, Nevada, United States	Catchweight (130 lb) bout.
Win	13–3	Jimmy Flick	TKO (elbows and punches)	UFC Fight Night: Strickland vs. Imavov	January 14, 2023	1	4:33	Las Vegas, Nevada, United States	
Win	12–3	Zhalgas Zhumagulov	Decision (split)	UFC Fight Night: Nzechukwu vs. Cuțelaba	November 19, 2022	3	5:00	Las Vegas, Nevada, United States	
Loss	11–3	Muhammad Mokaev	Decision (unanimous)	UFC Fight Night: Blaydes vs. Aspinall	July 23, 2022	3	5:00	London, England	
Win	11–2	Carlos Mota	TKO (punches)	LFA 122	January 22, 2022	5	0:45	St. Louis, Missouri, United States	Defended the LFA Flyweight Championship.
Win	10–2	João Camilo	TKO (punches)	LFA 114	August 27, 2021	2	4:07	St. Louis, Missouri, United States	Defended the interim LFA Flyweight Championship. Later promoted to undisputed champion.
Win	9–2	Yuma Horiuchi	Decision (split)	LFA 110	July 1, 2021	5	5:00	Shawnee, Oklahoma, United States	Won the interim LFA Flyweight Championship.
Win	8–2	Karlee Pangilinan	Submission (anaconda choke)	LFA 100	February 19, 2021	2	1:41	Park City, Kansas, United States	
Loss	7–2	Brandon Royval	Decision (unanimous)	LFA 48	September 7, 2018	3	5:00	Kearney, Nebraska, United States	
Win	7–1	Andrew Kimzey	TKO (punches)	LFA 42	June 8, 2018	1	1:41	Branson, Missouri, United States	
Loss	6–1	Sean Santella	Decision (unanimous)	PA Cage Fight 31	March 31, 2018	3	5:00	Wilkes-Barre, Pennsylvania, United States	For the PACF Flyweight Championship.
Win	6–0	Marc Tong Van	Submission (brabo choke)	Elite Fight League 1	January 20, 2018	1	3:20	Cedar Rapids, Iowa, United States	
Win	5–0	Jeremiah Cullum	Decision (split)	LFA 21	September 1, 2017	3	5:00	Branson, Missouri, United States	
Win	4–0	Michael Graves	Decision (unanimous)	Gateway Fighting Series 9	June 23, 2017	3	5:00	St. Charles, Missouri, United States	
Win	3–0	Ray Allard	Submission (kimura)	Fight Hard MMA 19	January 7, 2017	2	2:20	St. Charles, Missouri, United States	Flyweight debut.
Win	2–0	Alex Stephens	TKO (submission to punches)	True Revelation MMA 31	October 15, 2016	1	N/A	Burlington, Iowa, United States	
Win	1–0	Austin Reed	TKO (punches)	Ultimate Blue Corner FC 1	June 3, 2016	2	2:30	Kansas City, Missouri, United States	Bantamweight debut.

== Professional boxing record ==
10 fights	1 win	5 losses
By knockout	1	1
By decision	0	4
Draws	4	

No.	Result	Record	Opponent	Type	Round, time	Date	Location	Notes
10	Win	1–5–4	Phongsiri Tonabut	TKO	4 (6), 2:56	Feb 15, 2020	Rawai Boxing Stadium, Phuket, Thailand	
9	Loss	0–5–4	Pablo Sanchez	UD	4	Aug 10, 2019	Tyndall Armory, Indianapolis, Indiana, U.S.	
8	Loss	0–4–4	Carltavius Jones Johnson	UD	4	May 4, 2019	Horizons Event Center, Norcross, Georgia, U.S.	
7	Loss	0–3–4	Michael Valentin	MD	4	Apr 26, 2019	Twin River Event Center, Lincoln, Rhode Island, U.S.	
6	Draw	0–2–4	Tyjuan Townsend	MD	4	Apr 6, 2019	Casa Loma Ballroom, St. Louis, Missouri, U.S.	
5	Loss	0–2–3	Robert O'Quinn	TKO	3 (4), 3:00	Feb 23, 2019	Performance Arts Center, Dearborn, Michigan, U.S.	
4	Loss	0–1–3	Jeremy Hill	UD	4	Jul 14, 2018	Lakefront Arena, New Orleans, Louisiana, U.S.	
3	Draw	0–0–3	Kaywann Sistrunk	MD	4	May 11, 2018	Performance Arts Center, Dearborn, Michigan, U.S.	
2	Draw	0–0–2	Joel Flores	MD	4	Feb 2, 2018	WinnaVegas Casino & Resort, Sloan, Iowa, U.S.	
1	Draw	0–0–1	Tyjuan Townsend	UD	4	May 12, 2017	Heart of St. Charles Banquet Center, St. Charles, Missouri, U.S.	

== See also ==
- List of current UFC fighters
- List of male mixed martial artists
