= Muhammad Mokaev =

British mixed martial artist (born 2000)

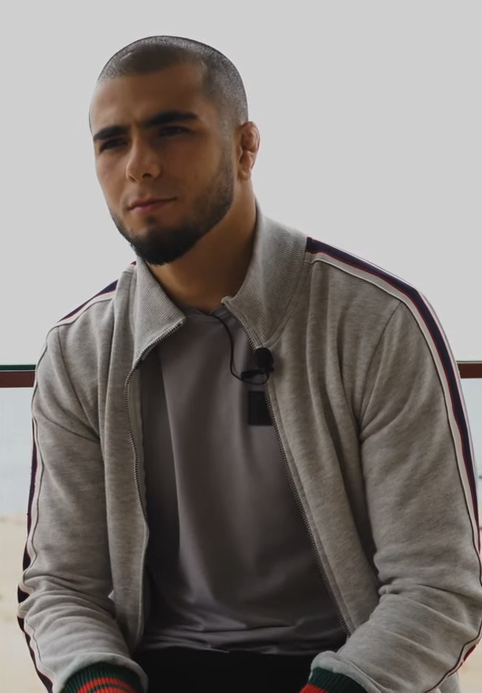
- Mokaev in 2022
- Born: 30 July 2000 (age 26); Buynaksk, Dagestan, Russia
- Other names: The Punisher
- Citizenship: United Kingdom
- Height: 5 ft 7 in (170 cm)
- Weight: 125 lb (57 kg; 8 st 13 lb)
- Division: Bantamweight (2016–2020, 2025–2026); Flyweight (2021–present)
- Reach: 70 in (178 cm)
- Style: Freestyle wrestling, Submission grappling
- Fighting out of: Manchester, England
- Team: KHK MMA; Aspire Combat Sports Academy (2015–present)
- Rank: Purple belt in Brazilian Jiu-Jitsu
- Years active: 2020–present

Mixed martial arts record
- Total: 18
- Wins: 17
- By knockout: 4
- By submission: 7
- By decision: 6
- Losses: 0
- No contests: 1

Amateur record
- Total: 23
- Wins: 23
- By knockout: 4
- By submission: 3
- Losses: 0

Other information
- Mixed martial arts record from Sherdog

Medal record

Amateur mixed martial arts

Representing United Kingdom

IMMAF Junior World Championships
Gold medal – first place	2018 Manama	-61.2 kg
Gold medal – first place	2019 Manama	-61.2 kg

IMMAF Senior Oceania Open Championships
Gold medal – first place	2020 Gold Coast	-61.2 kg

Representing England

IMMAF Junior European Open Championships
Gold medal – first place	2019 Rome	-61.2 kg

Representing England

Men's freestyle wrestling

British Championships
Silver medal – second place	2018 Manchester	65 kg
Bronze medal – third place	2016 Bolton	65 kg

English Nationals
Gold medal – first place	2026 Kettering	61 kg
Gold medal – first place	2019 Salford	61 kg
Silver medal – second place	2018 Salford	61 kg

Men's submission grappling

ADCC UK Championships
Gold medal – first place	2019 Manchester	65 kg (INT)
Gold medal – first place	2018 Manchester	65 kg (INT)

Muhammad Mokaev (Russian: Мухаммад Мурадович Мокаев; born 30 July 2000) is a British professional mixed martial artist and former freestyle wrestler. He currently competes in the Flyweight division of Brave Combat Federation, where he is the inaugural Brave CF Flyweight Champion. He formerly competed in the Flyweight division of the Ultimate Fighting Championship (UFC).

== Background ==
Mokaev was born in Buynaksk, Dagestan, Russia, to a Kumyk family. At the age of 12, he and his father moved to England, shortly after his mother had died. They lived in a refugee centre in Liverpool upon their arrival, being given £5 a day. Within a month they were moved to Wigan.

He had tried his hand in freestyle wrestling in Dagestan, but only started enjoying it when he joined the Manchester Wrestling Club in 2013 and started competing. Mokaev is twice a British Championship medallist and an English National champion (twice medallist), and has competed at the 2021 U23 World Championships finishing 5th and the 2021 Ion Corneanu & Ladislau Simon Memorial. In the junior level, he is a four-time British Champion, winning the tournament from 2014 to 2017, and also competed at the 2017 European Championships.

Mokaev picked up Brazilian jiu-jitsu and submission wrestling as well, becoming a two-time ADCC UK champion (intermediate division) in the latter.

== Mixed martial arts career ==
=== Early career ===
Mokaev made his amateur MMA debut in November 2015 and compiled four wins by the end of the following year in 2016. On 11 February 2017, Mokaev became the flyweight champion for Taking FC, defeating his opponent via unanimous decision. He was 16 years old at the time. Over the next four years he would go undefeated, finishing off as champion as IMMAF Amateur junior bantamweight champion in 2018 and 2019. Originally Mokaev started training in MMA at Kaobon MMA gym in Liverpool under the tutelage of Colin Heron. He worked and earned his gym membership by cleaning mats at the gym.

=== Mixed martial arts ===
==== Brave Combat Federation ====
Mokaev debuted on 1 August 2020, against Glenn McVeigh, in Sweden under the Brave Combat Federation 37 card. He scored a unanimous decision victory. He received a "Fight of the Night Bonus" for this fight.

Mokaev's second fight was against Hayden Sherriff under the Celtic Gladiator 28 card in England. Mokaev won the fight 51 seconds into the first round via TKO. Accredited MMA record keeper website Tapology has listed this bout as ineligible to be recorded as a professional MMA bout. They stated that "(Sherriff) Has purposely participated in bouts with no reasonable path to victory, displayed a lack of competitive effort, and is unjustifiably matched against far more skilled opponents. (He) has knowingly competed and/or listed themself under false names or aliases in order to hide their actual record or identity, or for another improper purpose." Sherriff officially has an 0-13 record in professional MMA and an 0-10 record in amateur MMA according to Sherdog, all of his losses have come in the first round.

His third fight was against Jamie Kelly, from Rochdale, fighting out of SBG gym under Martin Stapleton. He won the fight via a rear-naked choke, and received a "Fight of the Night" bonus.

His next fight was against Dave Jones under the Celtic Gladiator 28 promotion in Glasgow and he won the fight in the third round.

Mokaev faced Abdul Hussein at the Brave Combat Federation 49. It was described as "15 minutes of non-stop scrambling". The fight was won by decision by Mokaev.

His fight with Ibragim Nazurov at Brave Combat Federation 51 was ruled as a no-contest due to a low kick when Ibragim Nazurov was deemed unable to continue after absorbing a first round low blow.

He faced Blaine O'Driscoll at Brave Combat Federation 54 and won the fight via rear-naked choke in the second round.

==== Ultimate Fighting Championship ====
On 17 November 2021, Mokaev signed with UFC.

Mokaev made his UFC debut against Cody Durden on 19 March 2022. He won the fight via guillotine choke in round one. With this win, he received the Performance of the Night award.

Mokaev faced Charles Johnson in his second UFC bout on 23 July 2022, at UFC Fight Night 212. He won the fight via unanimous decision.

Mokaev faced Malcolm Gordon on 22 October 2022, at UFC 280. He won the fight via armbar in the third round.

Mokaev faced Jafel Filho on 18 March 2023 at UFC 286. He won the fight via a neck crank submission in the third round.

Mokaev faced Tim Elliott at UFC 294 on 21 October 2023. He won the fight by arm triangle choke in the third round. This fight earned him the Performance of the Night award.

Mokaev faced Alex Perez on 2 March 2024, at UFC Fight Night 238. Mokaev won the bout by unanimous decision.

Mokaev faced Manel Kape on 27 July 2024, at UFC 304. He won the fight by unanimous decision. At the event's post-fight press conference, UFC CEO Dana White said "‘PFL is going to get a great undefeated guy", that Mokaev's contract would not be renewed "for many different reasons" implying outside-the-cage-issues and that he was no longer with the promotion.

==== Return to Brave CF ====
On 24 August 2024, it was reported that Mokaev re-signed with the Brave Combat Federation.

Mokaev was scheduled to face Luthando Biko on 13 December 2024 at Brave CF 91. However, days before the event, Biko was forced to withdraw due to health issues and was replaced by Joevincent So in a 130 lb catchweight bout on two days' notice. Mokaev won the fight via a brabo choke submission in the first round.

Mokaev was scheduled to face former ONE Flyweight Champion Adriano Moraes on May 16, 2026 at MVP MMA 1. However, Mokaev withdrew from the bout due to visa issues and was replaced by Phumi Nkuta. On June 6, 2026, Mokaev faced former LUX Flyweight Champion Jorge Calvo Martin at WOW FC 31, where he secured a technical knockout victory in just 42 seconds.

== Grappling career ==
Mokaev competed in the no gi featherweight division of the BJJ 247 Manchester Open on 17 March 2024, where he was disqualified from his first match for slamming an opponent and lost his second match by submission.

Mokaev was due to compete against Raul Rosas Jr. in the main event of ADXC 6 on 25 October 2024. Rosas Jr withdrew from the match and was replaced by Rogério Bontorin, which Mokaev blamed on Rosas Jr.’s UFC contract. Mokaev lost the match by split decision.

Mokaev stepped in on just two days’ notice to face Arman Tsarukyan in a grappling match at Hype Fighting: Brazil on March 11, 2026. Despite the weight discrepancy, Mokaev moved up three weight classes—from flyweight—to face the lightweight contender, eventually losing via technical submission (rear-naked choke) at 7:46 of the first round after being rendered unconscious.

== Karate Combat ==
Mokaev won his debut at Karate Combat 54 on 2 May 2025 via flying knee.

== Personal life ==
Mokaev married Khava Eldarbekova in September 2020. He is a devout Muslim and has publicly criticized the act of Quran burning. Mokaev became a UK citizen in 2021. Mokaev is a supporter of the EFL League One football team Wigan Athletic and Super League rugby team, Wigan Warriors.

== Popular culture ==
Beyond the UFC: An Inside Look at BRAVE CF 91: The documentary, directed by MMA filmmaker Will Harris provides an inside look at Muhammad Mokaev's return to BRAVE CF at BRAVE CF 91. The film captures the chaotic fight week leading up to the event, including a last-minute opponent change and weight class adjustment, and offers a behind-the-scenes perspective on Mokaev's training at KHK MMA alongside world champions and Olympic medalists.

== Championships and accomplishments ==
=== Mixed martial arts ===
- Ultimate Fighting Championship
  - Performance of the Night (Two times) vs. Cody Durden and Tim Elliott
  - Tied (Joshua Van) for third longest win streak in UFC Flyweight division history (7)
  - Tied (Brandon Royval) for third most submissions in UFC Flyweight division history (4)
  - Third highest control time percentage in UFC Flyweight division history (51.8%)
  - Fifth highest top-position percentage in UFC Flyweight division history (37.9%)
  - Third fewest strikes absorbed-per-minute in UFC Flyweight division history (1.35)
  - UFC Honors Awards
    - 2022: Fan's Choice Debut of the Year Nominee vs. Cody Durden
  - UFC.com Awards
    - 2022: Ranked #3 Newcomer of the Year
- LowKick MMA
  - 2021 #3 Ranked Prospect of the Year
- MMA Fighting
  - 2022 Third Team MMA All-Star
  - 2023 Third Team MMA All-Star

== Mixed martial arts record ==
Professional record breakdown
18 matches	17 wins	0 losses
By knockout	4	0
By submission	7	0
By decision	6	0
No contests	1	

Res.	Record	Opponent	Method	Event	Date	Round	Time	Location	Notes
Win	17–0 (1)	Jorge Calvo	TKO (punches and elbows)	WOW 31	June 6, 2026	1	0:42	Madrid, Spain	Bantamweight bout.
Win	16–0 (1)	Gerard Burns	KO (head kick and punch)	Brave CF 100	November 7, 2025	2	0:08	Isa Town, Bahrain	Won the inaugural Brave CF Flyweight Championship.
Win	15–0 (1)	Thomas Assis	Decision (unanimous)	971 FC 2	June 14, 2025	3	5:00	Dubai, United Arab Emirates	Bantamweight bout.
Win	14–0 (1)	Joevincent So	Submission (brabo choke)	Brave CF 91	December 13, 2024	1	1:52	Isa Town, Bahrain	Catchweight (130 lb) bout.
Win	13–0 (1)	Manel Kape	Decision (unanimous)	UFC 304	July 27, 2024	3	5:00	Manchester, England	
Win	12–0 (1)	Alex Perez	Decision (unanimous)	UFC Fight Night: Rozenstruik vs. Gaziev	March 2, 2024	3	5:00	Las Vegas, Nevada, United States	
Win	11–0 (1)	Tim Elliott	Submission (arm-triangle choke)	UFC 294	October 21, 2023	3	3:03	Abu Dhabi, United Arab Emirates	Performance of the Night.
Win	10–0 (1)	Jafel Filho	Submission (neck crank)	UFC 286	March 18, 2023	3	4:32	London, England	
Win	9–0 (1)	Malcolm Gordon	Submission (armbar)	UFC 280	October 22, 2022	3	4:26	Abu Dhabi, United Arab Emirates	
Win	8–0 (1)	Charles Johnson	Decision (unanimous)	UFC Fight Night: Blaydes vs. Aspinall	July 23, 2022	3	5:00	London, England	
Win	7–0 (1)	Cody Durden	Submission (guillotine choke)	UFC Fight Night: Volkov vs. Aspinall	March 19, 2022	1	0:58	London, England	Performance of the Night.
Win	6–0 (1)	Blaine O'Driscoll	Submission (rear-naked choke)	Brave CF 54	September 25, 2021	2	1:36	Konin, Poland	Catchweight (130 lb) bout.
NC	5–0 (1)	Ibragim Navruzov	NC (accidental groin kick)	Brave CF 51	June 4, 2021	1	1:24	Minsk, Belarus	Catchweight (130 lb) bout. An accidental groin kick rendered Navruzov unable to continue.
Win	5–0	Abdul Hussein	Decision (unanimous)	Brave CF 49	March 25, 2021	3	5:00	Manama, Bahrain	Flyweight debut.
Win	4–0	Dave Jones	TKO (submission to punches)	Celtic Gladiator 28	November 22, 2020	3	2:11	Glasgow, Scotland	
Win	3–0	Jamie Kelly	Submission (rear-naked choke)	Brave CF 43	October 1, 2020	3	2:11	Manama, Bahrain	
Win	2–0	Hayden Sherriff	TKO (body kick and punches)	Celtic Gladiator 27	August 22, 2020	1	0:51	Manchester, England	
Win	1–0	Glenn McVeigh	Decision (unanimous)	Brave CF 37	August 1, 2020	3	5:00	Stockholm, Sweden	Bantamweight debut.

Amateur record breakdown		
23 matches	23 wins	0 losses
By knockout	5	0
By submission	3	0
By decision	15	0

Res.	Record	Opponent	Method	Event	Date	Round	Time	Location	Notes
Win	23–0	Abdulla Mubarak	Submission (rear-naked choke)	2020 IMMAF-WMMAA Oceania Championships: Finals	8 March 2020	1	1:29	Gold Coast, Australia	Won IMMAF WMMAA OCEANA Championships.
Win	22–0	Abdulla Alyaqoob	Decision (unanimous)	2020 IMMAF-WMMAA Oceania Championships: Semifinals	7 March 2020	3	3:00	Gold Coast, Australia	IMMAF WMMAA OCEANA Championships Semifinal.
Win	21–0	Reo Yamaguchi	Decision (unanimous)	2019 IMMAF-WMMAA Junior World Championships: Day 4, Finals	14 November 2019	3	3:00	Manama, Bahrain	
Win	20–0	Tynyshtyk Zhanibek	Decision (unanimous)	2019 IMMAF-WMMAA Junior World Championships: Day 3, Cage 3	13 November 2019	3	3:00	Manama, Bahrain	
Win	19–0	Nikolay Atanasov	Decision (unanimous)	2019 IMMAF-WMMAA Junior World Championships: Day 2, Cage 2	12 November 2019	3	3:00	Manama, Bahrain	
Win	18–0	Max Hynninen	Decision (unanimous)	2019 IMMAF-WMMAA Junior World Championships: Day 1, Cage 1	11 November 2019	3	3:00	Manama, Bahrain	
Win	17–0	Mikey Boden	TKO (punches)	World Combat FC 3	28 September 2019	2	2:10	Manchester, England	
Win	16–0	Myles Richards	Decision (unanimous)	Caged Steel FC 23	13 July 2019	3	3:00	Sheffield, England	Won vacant Caged Steel FC Bantamweight Championship.
Win	15–0	Reo Yamaguchi	Decision (unanimous)	2019 IMMAF-WMMAA European Junior Open Championships: Junior Finals	22 June 2019	3	3:00	Rome, Italy	
Win	14–0	Batir Sharukhanov	Decision (unanimous)	2019 IMMAF-WMMAA European Junior Open Championships: Day 3	21 June 2019	3	3:00	Rome, Italy	
Win	13–0	Abanoub Fares	TKO (punches)	2019 IMMAF-WMMAA European Junior Open Championships: Day 2	20 June 2019	1	2:32	Rome, Italy	
Win	12–0	Ciaran Mulholland	Decision (unanimous)	UK Fighting Championships 9	23 March 2019	3	3:00	Preston, England	Won vacant UKFC Bantamweight Championship.
Win	11–0	Reo Yamaguchi	Decision (unanimous)	2019 IMMAF-WMMAA Unified Junior World Championships: Day 5, Finals	17 November 2018	3	3:00	Manama, Bahrain	
Win	10–0	Ismael Zamora	Decision (unanimous)	2019 IMMAF-WMMAA Unified Junior World Championships: Day 4, Cage 1	15 November 2018	3	3:00	Manama, Bahrain	
Win	9–0	Nurbolat Oteuov	Decision (unanimous)	2019 IMMAF-WMMAA Unified Junior World Championships: Day 3, Cage 2	14 November 2018	3	3:00	Manama, Bahrain	
Win	8–0	Imran Satiev	Submission (rear-naked choke)	2019 IMMAF-WMMAA Unified Junior World Championships: Day 2, Cage 3	13 November 2018	1	0:57	Manama, Bahrain	
Win	7–0	Jack Eglin	TKO (slam & punches)	UK Fighting Championships 5	7 October 2017	2	2:25	Preston, England	Won vacant UKFC Flyweight Championship.
Win	6–0	Sebastian Gonzalez	TKO (punches)	Tanko FC 4	12 May 2017	1	0:37	Manchester, England	
Win	5–0	Liam Gittins	Decision (unanimous)	Tanko FC 3	11 February 2017	5	3:00	Manchester, England	Won inaugural Tanko FC Amateur Flyweight Championship.
Win	4–0	Markus Hægland	Decision (unanimous)	Tanko FC 2	3 December 2016	3	3:00	Manchester, England	
Win	3–0	Jose Rufino	TKO (punches)	ICE FC 18	28 October 2016	2	1:27	Bolton, England	
Win	2–0	Ash McCracken	Decision (unanimous)	Full Contact Contender 17	24 September 2016	3	3:00	Manchester, England	
Win	1–0	Jake Hinton	Submission (rear-naked choke)	Shinobi War 6	28 November 2015	1	2:25	Manchester, England	

== Submission grappling record ==
3 Matches, 0 Wins, 3 Losses, 0 Draws
Result	Rec.	Opponent	Method	Event	Date	Location
Loss	0–3	Arman Tsarukyan	Technical Submission (rear-naked choke)	Hype FC Brazil: Rio	Mar 11, 2026	Rio De Janeiro, Brazil
Loss	0–2	Rogério Bontorin	Decision (split)	ADXC 6	October 25, 2024	Abu Dhabi, UAE
Loss	0–1	Zain Hayat	DQ (illegal slam)	BJJ 247 Manchester Open	March 17, 2024	Manchester, England

== Karate Combat record ==
Professional record breakdown
1 match	1 win	0 losses
By knockout	1	0

Res.	Record	Opponent	Method	Event	Date	Round	Time	Location	Notes
Win	1–0	Bolat Zamanbekov	TKO (flying knee)	Karate Combat 54	May 2, 2025	2	1:23	Dubai, United Arab Emirates	

== See also ==
- List of male mixed martial artists
- List of undefeated mixed martial artists
