= UFC Fight Night: Rozenstruik vs. Gaziev =

2024 mixed martial event in Nevada, US

- The poster for UFC Fight Night: Rozenstruik vs. Gaziev
- Promotion: Ultimate Fighting Championship
- Date: March 2, 2024
- Venue: UFC Apex
- City: Enterprise, Nevada, United States
- Attendance: Not announced

Event chronology
UFC Fight Night: Moreno vs. Royval 2	UFC Fight Night: Rozenstruik vs. Gaziev	UFC 299: O'Malley vs. Vera 2

UFC Fight Night: Rozenstruik vs. Gaziev (also known as UFC Fight Night 238, UFC on ESPN+ 96 and UFC Vegas 87) was a mixed martial arts event produced by the Ultimate Fighting Championship that took place on March 2, 2024, at the UFC Apex facility, in Enterprise, Nevada, part of the Las Vegas Metropolitan Area, United States.

== Background ==
This event would have marked the promotion's debut in Saudi Arabia. However on January 15, it was reported by Ariel Helwani that the local organization was seeking a deeper and more high-profile card than was being offered by the UFC and the event was postponed to a later date – possibly in June. At the time of publication, it is unclear if the fights scheduled for the event will still take place at a different location, or if the bouts will be rescheduled for new dates. UFC CEO Dana White later dismissed the move was due to a "weak lineup for the event" and said that "a couple of fights that we wanted to line up, weren’t ready to go" as the reason for the postponement, also adding that they "didn't tell Saudi Arabia about one fight".

On January 24, Saudi Arabia's chairman of General Entertainment Authority Turki Alalshikh announced the event in Riyadh (expected to take place at Kingdom Arena) had been officially postponed until June 22, citing "a decision to reschedule was taken to ensure the best caliber of talent will be available to participate". The March 2 event took place at the UFC Apex in Las Vegas with the same fights originally booked for the event.

A heavyweight bout between Jairzinho Rozenstruik and Shamil Gaziev headlined the event.

A flyweight bout between Matt Schnell and Steve Erceg took place at the event. They were originally scheduled for UFC 295 in November 2023, but Schnell withdrew for unknown reasons.

A women's strawweight bout between Josefine Lindgren Knutsson and Julia Polastri was expected to take place at this event. However, Knutsson pulled out due to injury and Polastri was rescheduled to face Stephanie Luciano at UFC Fight Night: Ribas vs. Namajunas.

A featherweight between Mohammad Yahya and Brendon Marotte was scheduled for the event. However, the bout was cancelled after Marotte sustained an injury.

Vinicius Oliveira and Yanis Ghemmouri were expected to meet in a bantamweight bout. However, Ghemmouri withdrew due to injury. He was replaced by Bernardo Sopaj.

A bantamweight bout between Raul Rosas Jr. and The Ultimate Fighter 29 bantamweight winner Ricky Turcios was expected to take place at the event. They were originally expected to meet one week prior at UFC Fight Night: Moreno vs. Royval 2 but the bout was pushed back a week when Rosas Jr. suffered an illness. However, the bout was ultimately scrapped for unknown reasons.

A lightweight bout between Joel Álvarez and Ľudovít Klein was expected to take place at the event. However, Álvarez withdrew for unknown reasons and was replaced by AJ Cunningham.

== Results ==
Fight card (ESPN+)
Weight class				Method	Round	Time	Notes
Heavyweight	Jairzinho Rozenstruik	def.	Shamil Gaziev	TKO (retirement)	4	5:00
Light Heavyweight	Vitor Petrino	def.	Tyson Pedro	Decision (unanimous) (30–27, 30–27, 29–28)	3	5:00
Flyweight	Muhammad Mokaev	def.	Alex Perez	Decision (unanimous) (29–28, 29–28, 29–28)	3	5:00
Bantamweight	Umar Nurmagomedov	def.	Bekzat Almakhan	Decision (unanimous) (30–25, 30–26, 30–26)	3	5:00
Flyweight	Steve Erceg	def.	Matt Schnell	KO (punch)	2	0:26
Preliminary card (ESPN+)
Middleweight	Eryk Anders	def.	Jamie Pickett	Decision (unanimous) (29–27, 29–28, 29–28)	3	5:00
Bantamweight	Vinicius Oliveira	def.	Bernardo Sopaj	KO (flying knee)	3	4:41
Bantamweight	Aiemann Zahabi	def.	Javid Basharat	Decision (unanimous) (29–28, 29–28, 29–28)	3	5:00
Middleweight	Christian Leroy Duncan	def.	Cláudio Ribeiro	TKO (elbows and punches)	2	1:57
Lightweight	Ľudovít Klein	def.	AJ Cunningham	TKO (front kick to the body and punches)	1	4:36
Lightweight	Loik Radzhabov	def.	Abdul-Kareem Al-Selwady	KO (punches)	3	0:49

== Bonus awards ==
The following fighters received $50,000 bonuses.

- Fight of the Night: Vinicius Oliveira vs. Bernardo Sopaj
- Performance of the Night: Steve Erceg and Vinicius Oliveira

== See also ==
- 2024 in UFC
- List of current UFC fighters
- List of UFC events
