= Ode' Osbourne =

Jamaican mixed martial arts fighter

Ode’ Osbourne
- Born: Ode’ Omaani Osbourne; January 9, 1992 (age 34); Kingston, Jamaica
- Other names: The Jamaican Sensation
- Height: 5 ft 7 in (1.70 m)
- Weight: 125 lb (57 kg; 8 st 13 lb)
- Division: Flyweight (2021–present); Bantamweight (2015–2020, 2025); Featherweight (2019, 2021)
- Reach: 73 in (185 cm)
- Stance: Southpaw
- Fighting out of: Milwaukee, Wisconsin, U.S. Las Vegas, Nevada, U.S.
- Team: Waukesha MMA (2012–2015); Roufusport (2015–2018); Pura Vida BJJ/MMA (2018–2021); Syndicate MMA (2021–2022); Black Kobra MMA (2022–present)
- Rank: Purple belt in Brazilian Jiu-Jitsu; Purple belt in Kickboxing
- Years active: 2015–present

Mixed martial arts record
- Total: 25
- Wins: 13
- By knockout: 6
- By submission: 4
- By decision: 3
- Losses: 10
- By knockout: 2
- By submission: 4
- By decision: 4
- No contests: 2

Other information
- Mixed martial arts record from Sherdog

Ode’ Omaani Osbourne (born January 9, 1992) is a Jamaican mixed martial artist who currently competes in the Flyweight division of the Ultimate Fighting Championship (UFC).

== Background ==
Growing up in Kingston, Jamaica, Osbourne lived primarily with his grandmother and then his great grandmother. His mother had him when she was 18 and still in school, and his father moved away to England when he was seven. At the age of 9, Osbourne moved to Flatbush section of Brooklyn, New York. He would bounce around after that, making a stop in Florida where he played high school football alongside Jacoby Brissett in William T. Dwyer High School. After dropping football for wrestling, he excelled as a member of the school’s wrestling team, where he became a three time state finalist. Osbourne enrolled at Wisconsin's Carroll University, where his high school coach Ben Tomes had just accepted a position. After reaching nationals as a freshman, Osbourne hit a bump in the road, as the wrestling program was shut down the ensuing year.

Osbourne works as an assistant teacher for his full-time job.

== Mixed martial arts career ==
=== Early career ===
Osbourne made his amateur mixed martial arts debut in 2013, originally starting his training at small gym in Waukesha, Wisconsin. He made his mixed martial arts debut at NAFC: Explosion in 2015, he submitted Brent Lee via rear-naked choke in the second round, before defeating his next two opponents in David Rhodes and Doug Milbrath. He would then lose his first professional fight against Antonio Sanchez via unanimous decision at RFA 39, Osbourne faced Cory Galloway at Pure Fighting Championships 5, and went on to defeat him via split decision. Osbourne would lose against this time to Jose Luis Calvo via kneebar in the first minute of the bout at United Combat League: Havoc In Hammond 4. Osbourne would win his next three bouts; Seigenald Aurtan Daley Jr in the first round via triangle choke at Pure Fighting Championship 9, Daley Jr for the second time via TKO in round one at Pure FC 10, and finally Kelly Offield in round one via triangle choke at HD MMA 15.

=== Dana White's Contender Series ===
Osbourne faced Armando Villarreal on July 16, 2019, at Dana White's Contender Series 20 for a chance at a UFC contract. He won the bout after submitting Villarreal via armbar in the first round, earning a UFC contract in the process.

=== Ultimate Fighting Championship ===
Osbourne made his UFC debut against Brian Kelleher at UFC 246 on January 18, 2020. He lost the fight via a submission in the first round.

Osbourne was expected to face Jerome Rivera at a UFC event on January 30, 2021. The event never materialized and the pairing was canceled.

Osbourne was expected to face Denys Bondar in a catchweight bout of 130 pounds on February 6, 2021, at UFC Fight Night 184. However, Bondar withdrew during fight week due to undisclosed reasons and was replaced by Jerome Rivera, with their bout taking place at featherweight. Osbourne won the fight via knockout out in round one.

Osbourne was expected to face Amir Albazi on July 17, 2021, at UFC on ESPN 26. However, Albazi pulled out of the fight in late June citing injury. In turn, Osbourne was pulled from the card entirely and rescheduled for a future event.

Osbourne faced Manel Kape on August 7, 2021, at UFC 265. At the weigh-ins, Kape weighed in at 129 pounds, three pounds over the flyweight non-title fight limit. The bout proceeded at catchweight and Kape was fined 20% of his purse, which went to Osbourne. He lost the fight via knockout in round one.

Osbourne faced C.J. Vergara on November 6, 2021, at UFC 268. At the weigh-ins, Vergara weighed in at 127.4 pounds, 1.4 pounds over the flyweight non-title fight limit. The bout proceeded at a catchweight and he forfeited 20% of his purse to Osbourne. Osbourne won the fight via unanimous decision.

Osbourne faced Zarrukh Adashev on June 4, 2022, at UFC Fight Night 207. He won the fight via knockout in the first round. This win earned him the Performance of the Night award.

Osbourne faced Tyson Nam on August 13, 2022 at UFC on ESPN 41. He lost the fight via knockout in round one.

Osbourne was scheduled to face Denys Bondar on February 25, 2023, at UFC Fight Night 220. However, Bondar withdrew from the event for undisclosed reasons and he was replaced by Charles Johnson. Osbourne won the fight via split decision.

Osbourne next faced promotional newcomer Asu Almabayev at UFC on ESPN 50 on August 5, 2023. He lost the fight via a rear-naked choke submission in the second round.

Osbourne faced Jafel Filho on March 16, 2024, at UFC Fight Night 239. He lost via rear-naked choke submission at the end of the first round.

Osbourne faced Ronaldo Rodríguez on September 14, 2024 at UFC 306. He lost the fight by unanimous decision.

Osbourne faced promotional newcomer Luis Gurule on April 5, 2025 at UFC on ESPN 65. He won the fight by technical knockout in the second round. This fight earned him another Performance of the Night award.

Replacing Park Hyun-sung, Osbourne stepped in on short notice to face former UFC Flyweight Championship challenger Steve Erceg in a bantamweight bout on August 9, 2025, at UFC on ESPN 72. He lost the fight by unanimous decision.

Osbourne faced Alibi Idiris on February 21, 2026 at UFC Fight Night 267. The bout was originally a unanimous decision (29–28, 30–27, 30–27) win for Idiris. However, on March 31, 2026, it was reported that the result was overturned to a no contest after Idiris tested positive for hydrochlorothiazide.

Osbourne was scheduled to face Cody Durden on July 11, 2026 at UFC 329. However, Osbourne had to withdraw due to an undisclosed injury and was replaced by Alessandro Costa. His fight with Durden was rescheduled for October 31, 2026 on UFC Fight Night 292. He lost the fight by unanimous decision.

== Championships and accomplishments ==
- Ultimate Fighting Championship
  - Performance of the Night (Two times) vs. Zarrukh Adashev and Luis Gurule

== Mixed martial arts record ==
Professional record breakdown
25 matches	13 wins	10 losses
By knockout	6	2
By submission	4	4
By decision	3	4
No contests	2	

Res.	Record	Opponent	Method	Event	Date	Round	Time	Location	Notes
Loss	13–10 (2)	Cody Durden	Decision (unanimous)	UFC Fight Night: Moicano vs. Nolan	October 31, 2026	3	5:00	Las Vegas, Nevada, United States	
NC	13–9 (2)	Alibi Idiris	NC (overturned)	UFC Fight Night: Strickland vs. Hernandez	February 21, 2026	3	5:00	Houston, Texas, United States	Originally a unanimous decision win for Idiris; overturned after he tested positive for hydrochlorothiazide.
Loss	13–9 (1)	Steve Erceg	Decision (unanimous)	UFC on ESPN: Dolidze vs. Hernandez	August 9, 2025	3	5:00	Las Vegas, Nevada, United States	Bantamweight bout.
Win	13–8 (1)	Luis Gurule	TKO (punches)	UFC on ESPN: Emmett vs. Murphy	April 5, 2025	2	1:54	Las Vegas, Nevada, United States	Performance of the Night.
Loss	12–8 (1)	Ronaldo Rodríguez	Decision (unanimous)	UFC 306	September 14, 2024	3	5:00	Las Vegas, Nevada, United States	
Loss	12–7 (1)	Jafel Filho	Submission (rear-naked choke)	UFC Fight Night: Tuivasa vs. Tybura	March 16, 2024	1	4:27	Las Vegas, Nevada, United States	
Loss	12–6 (1)	Asu Almabayev	Submission (rear-naked choke)	UFC on ESPN: Sandhagen vs. Font	August 5, 2023	2	3:11	Nashville, Tennessee, United States	
Win	12–5 (1)	Charles Johnson	Decision (split)	UFC Fight Night: Muniz vs. Allen	February 25, 2023	3	5:00	Las Vegas, Nevada, United States	Catchweight (130 lb) bout.
Loss	11–5 (1)	Tyson Nam	KO (punches)	UFC on ESPN: Vera vs. Cruz	August 13, 2022	1	2:59	San Diego, California, United States	
Win	11–4 (1)	Zarrukh Adashev	KO (punches)	UFC Fight Night: Volkov vs. Rozenstruik	June 4, 2022	1	1:01	Las Vegas, Nevada, United States	Performance of the Night.
Win	10–4 (1)	C.J. Vergara	Decision (unanimous)	UFC 268	November 6, 2021	3	5:00	New York City, New York, United States	Catchweight (127.4 lb) bout; Vergara missed weight.
Loss	9–4 (1)	Manel Kape	KO (flying knee and punches)	UFC 265	August 7, 2021	1	4:44	Houston, Texas, United States	Flyweight debut; Kape missed weight (129 lb).
Win	9–3 (1)	Jerome Rivera	KO (punches)	UFC Fight Night: Overeem vs. Volkov	February 6, 2021	1	0:26	Las Vegas, Nevada, United States	Featherweight bout.
Loss	8–3 (1)	Brian Kelleher	Submission (guillotine choke)	UFC 246	January 18, 2020	1	2:49	Las Vegas, Nevada, United States	
Win	8–2 (1)	Armando Villarreal	Submission (armbar)	Dana White's Contender Series 20	July 16, 2019	1	4:39	Las Vegas, Nevada, United States	
Win	7–2 (1)	Kelly Offield	Submission (triangle choke)	HD MMA 15	January 19, 2019	1	4:07	Shawnee, Oklahoma, United States	Featherweight bout.
Win	6–2 (1)	Aurtan Daley	TKO (punches)	Pure FC 10	October 20, 2018	1	2:16	Milwaukee, Wisconsin, United States	
Win	5–2 (1)	Aurtan Daley	Submission (triangle choke)	Pure FC 9	July 28, 2018	1	1:44	Milwaukee, Wisconsin, United States	
Loss	4–2 (1)	Jose Luis Calvo	Submission (kneebar)	United Combat League: Havoc in Hammond 4	September 23, 2017	1	0:24	Hammond, Indiana, United States	For the UCL Bantamweight Championship.
Win	4–1 (1)	Cory Galloway	Decision (split)	Pure FC 5	September 24, 2016	3	5:00	Milwaukee, Wisconsin, United States	
Loss	3–1 (1)	Antonio Sanchez	Decision (unanimous)	RFA 39	Jun 17, 2016	3	5:00	Hammond, Indiana, United States	
Win	3–0 (1)	David Rhoads	TKO (submission to punches)	North American FC: Super Brawl	January 30, 2016	1	4:36	Waukesha, Wisconsin, United States	
Win	2–0 (1)	Doug Milbrath	TKO (punches)	North American FC: Battledome	September 12, 2015	1	1:37	Waukesha, Wisconsin, United States	Bantamweight debut.
NC	1–0 (1)	Murjan Flowers	NC (accidental eye poke)	Pure FC 1	May 24, 2015	2	0:00	Milwaukee, Wisconsin, United States	Accidental eye poke rendered Flowers unable to continue.
Win	1–0	Brent Lee	Submission (rear-naked choke)	North American FC: Explosion	April 11, 2015	2	1:10	Waukesha, Wisconsin, United States	Featherweight debut.

== See also ==
- List of current UFC fighters
- List of male mixed martial artists
