= Tyson Pedro =

Australian mixed martial artist

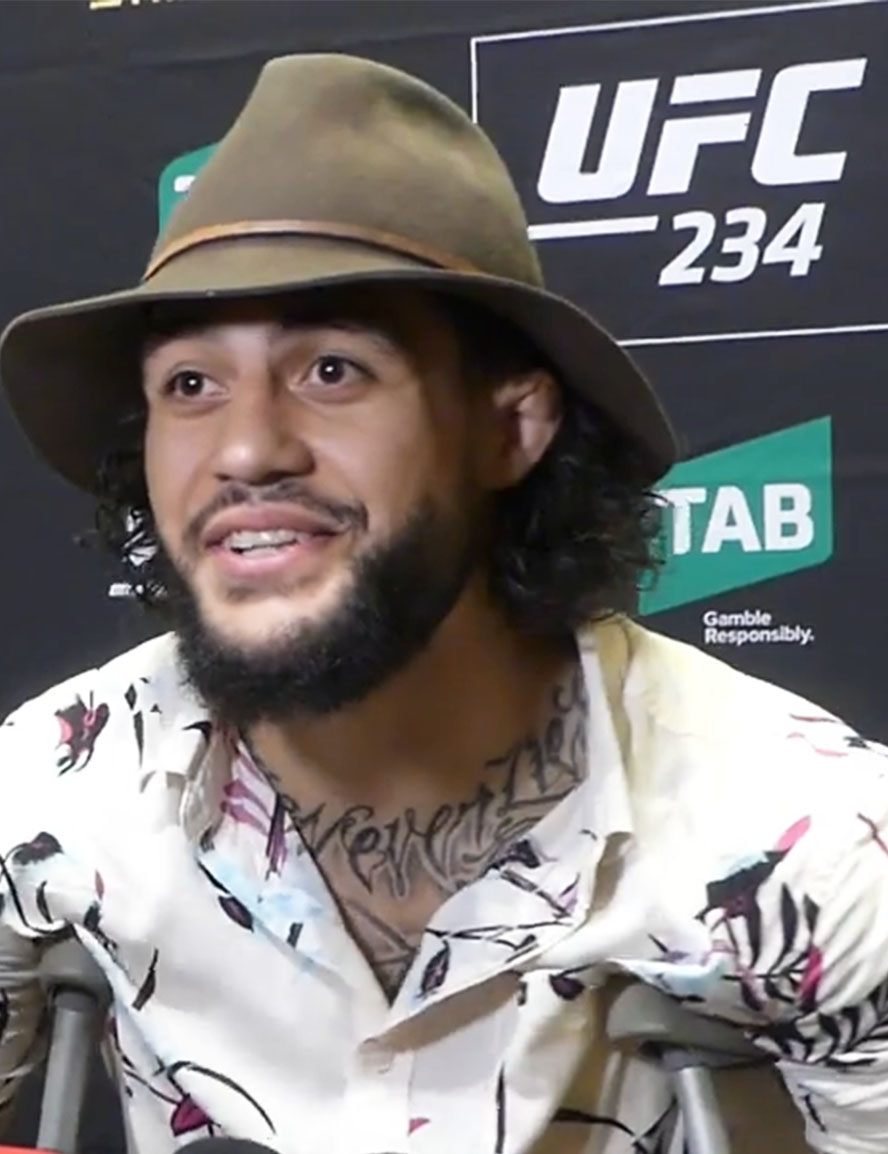
- Tyson Pedro at UFC 234
- Born: 17 September 1991 (age 35); Penrith, New South Wales, Australia
- Height: 6 ft 3 in (1.91 m)
- Weight: 220 lb (100 kg; 16 st)
- Division: Bridgerweight (Boxing); Light heavyweight (MMA)
- Reach: 79 in (201 cm)
- Fighting out of: Sydney, Australia
- Team: City Kickboxing
- Rank: Black belt in Japanese Jiu-Jitsu; Black belt in Kempo; Black belt in Brazilian Jiu-Jitsu
- Years active: 2013–present (MMA); 2025–present (Boxing)

Professional boxing record
- Total: 1
- Wins: 1
- By knockout: 1

Mixed martial arts record
- Total: 17
- Wins: 10
- By knockout: 5
- By submission: 5
- Losses: 7
- By knockout: 2
- By submission: 1
- By decision: 4

Other information
- Boxing record from BoxRec
- Mixed martial arts record from Sherdog

Tyson Pedro (born 17 September 1991) is an Australian professional boxer and mixed martial artist who competes in the Light heavyweight division of the Professional Fighters League. He previously competed in the Ultimate Fighting Championship (UFC). As of March 26, 2026, he is #9 in the PFL light heavyweight rankings.

== Background ==
Pedro is an Australian of American Samoan heritage. He played junior rugby league for St Dominic's College as a teenager but gave the sport away to focus on martial arts. Pedro is the son of John Pedro, who owned King of the Cage in Australia and was one of exponent MMA and fighters fought in the first cage fight in Australia. With seven black belts of different combat sport style, Pedro was introduced to Japanese jiu-jitsu at the age of four. From jujutsu, he progressed to boxing and Brazilian jiu-jitsu before eventually fighting MMA.

== Mixed martial arts career ==
After winning over Kiwi Steven Warby at Australian Fighting Championship 17 via rear-naked choke, Pedro called UFC president Dana White and personally asked him to fight at UFC Fight Night: Whittaker vs. Brunson in Melbourne, should any fighters pull out from the event. He was added to the card after Luke Rockhold withdrew from the event due to a sprained anterior cruciate ligament.

=== Ultimate Fighting Championship ===
Pedro made his promotional debut against Khalil Rountree on November 15, 2016, at UFC Fight Night: Whittaker vs. Brunson. He won the fight via submission in round 1, for which he was awarded a Performance of the Night bonus.

Pedro faced Paul Craig on March 4, 2017, at UFC 209. He won the fight via first round TKO.

Pedro fought Ilir Latifi on September 9, 2017, at UFC 215. Latifi won the fight via unanimous decision, handing Pedro his first professional loss.

Pedro faced Saparbek Safarov on February 11, 2018, at UFC 221. He won the fight via submission due to a kimura in the first round.

Pedro faced Ovince Saint Preux on June 23, 2018, at UFC Fight Night: Cowboy vs. Edwards. He lost the fight via submission in the first round.

On August 10, 2018, it was revealed that Pedro had signed a new, six-fight contract with the UFC.

Pedro faced Maurício Rua on December 2, 2018, at UFC Fight Night 142. Rua defeated Pedro via technical knockout in round three, finishing Pedro after he suffered a leg injury and was unable to defend himself.

Pedro was sidelined for all of 2019 as he recovered from knee reconstruction surgery.

Pedro was scheduled to face Vinicius Moreira on February 23, 2020, at UFC Fight Night: Felder vs. Hooker. However, Pedro pulled out of the fight in early January citing an undisclosed injury.

After a three-year absence from fighting, Pedro returned to face Ike Villanueva on April 23, 2022, at UFC Fight Night 205. He won the fight via knockout in the first round.

Pedro faced Harry Hunsucker on August 20, 2022 at UFC 278 . He won the fight after stopping Hunsucker with a front kick to the body and ground and pound.

Pedro was scheduled to face Zhang Mingyang on February 12, 2023 at UFC 284. However, Mingyang withdrew for unknown reasons and was replaced by Modestas Bukauskas. He lost the fight via unanimous decision.

Pedro faced Anton Turkalj on September 10, 2023, at UFC 293. He won the fight via first round knockout.

Pedro faced Vitor Petrino on March 2, 2024, at UFC Fight Night 238. He lost the bout by unanimous decision and retired from MMA after the bout.

=== Professional Fighters League ===
On December 15, 2025, it was reported that Pedro was returning from retirement and signed with the Professional Fighters League.

Pedro made his PFL debut against Dovletdzhan Yagshimuradov on April 16, 2026, at PFL Belfast. He lost the fight via unanimous decision.

Pedro faced Rafael Xavier on July 25, 2026, at PFL Washington DC. He lost the fight via technical knockout in the final seconds of round one.

== Boxing career ==
Pedro was scheduled to make his pro boxing debut against Kris Terzievski on June 12, 2024 in Moore Park, NSW, Australia. On May 8, 2024 it was announced that Pedro suffered an arm injury and the fight was cancelled.

== Personal life ==
Pedro is married. His father, John Pedro, is famous for bringing MMA to Australia.

Pedro's brother-in-law is UFC heavyweight fighter Tai Tuivasa.

Pedro is a fan of the Penrith Panthers, a professional Rugby league team in Australia.

As of December 2017, Pedro hosted "The Halfcast Podcast" with Tai Tuivasa as co-host.

He is named after former undisputed heavyweight boxing champion Mike Tyson.

Pedro is co-owner of Drink West Brewery with Tai Tuivasa and Nathan Cleary.

== Championships and accomplishments ==
=== Mixed martial arts ===
- Ultimate Fighting Championship
  - Performance of the Night (One time) vs. Khalil Rountree Jr.

== Mixed martial arts record ==
Professional record breakdown
17 matches	10 wins	7 losses
By knockout	5	2
By submission	5	1
By decision	0	4

Res.	Record	Opponent	Method	Event	Date	Round	Time	Location	Notes
Loss	10–7	Rafael Xavier	TKO (elbows)	PFL Washington DC: Jean vs. Rodriguez	July 25, 2026	1	4:59	Washington, D.C., United States	
Loss	10–6	Dovletdzhan Yagshimuradov	Decision (unanimous)	PFL Belfast: Kelly vs. Wilson	April 16, 2026	3	5:00	Belfast, Northern Ireland	
Loss	10–5	Vitor Petrino	Decision (unanimous)	UFC Fight Night: Rozenstruik vs. Gaziev	March 2, 2024	3	5:00	Las Vegas, Nevada, United States	
Win	10–4	Anton Turkalj	KO (punches)	UFC 293	September 10, 2023	1	2:12	Sydney, Australia	
Loss	9–4	Modestas Bukauskas	Decision (unanimous)	UFC 284	February 12, 2023	3	5:00	Perth, Australia	
Win	9–3	Harry Hunsucker	TKO (body kick and punches)	UFC 278	August 20, 2022	1	1:05	Salt Lake City, Utah, United States	
Win	8–3	Ike Villanueva	KO (leg kick and punches)	UFC Fight Night: Lemos vs. Andrade	April 23, 2022	1	4:55	Las Vegas, Nevada, United States	
Loss	7–3	Maurício Rua	TKO (punches)	UFC Fight Night: dos Santos vs. Tuivasa	December 2, 2018	3	0:43	Adelaide, Australia	
Loss	7–2	Ovince Saint Preux	Submission (straight armbar)	UFC Fight Night: Cowboy vs. Edwards	June 23, 2018	1	2:54	Kallang, Singapore	
Win	7–1	Saparbek Safarov	Submission (kimura)	UFC 221	February 10, 2018	1	3:54	Perth, Australia	
Loss	6–1	Ilir Latifi	Decision (unanimous)	UFC 215	September 9, 2017	3	5:00	Edmonton, Alberta, Canada	
Win	6–0	Paul Craig	TKO (elbows)	UFC 209	March 4, 2017	1	4:10	Las Vegas, Nevada, United States	
Win	5–0	Khalil Rountree Jr.	Submission (rear-naked choke)	UFC Fight Night: Whittaker vs. Brunson	November 27, 2016	1	4:07	Melbourne, Australia	Performance of the Night.
Win	4–0	Stephen Warby	Submission (rear-naked choke)	Australian FC 17	October 15, 2016	1	3:05	Melbourne, Australia	
Win	3–0	Don Endermann	Submission (rear-naked choke)	Australian FC 16	June 18, 2016	1	2:27	Melbourne, Australia	
Win	2–0	Michael Fitzgerald	Submission (guillotine choke)	Urban Fight Night 6	March 12, 2016	1	2:20	Sydney, Australia	
Win	1–0	Charlie Ngaheu	KO (punch)	Eternal MMA 3	September 23, 2013	1	0:31	Gold Coast, Australia	

== Professional boxing record ==
1 fight	1 win	0 losses
By knockout	1	0

No.	Result	Record	Opponent	Type	Round, time	Date	Location	Notes
1	Win	1–0	Taimoor Khan	TKO	7 (10), 0:44	Feb 26, 2025	Panthers Rugby League Club, Penrith, Australia	Won inaugural WBC Silver International bridgerweight title

== See also ==
- List of male mixed martial artists
