= Vitor Petrino =

Brazilian mixed martial artist (born 1997)

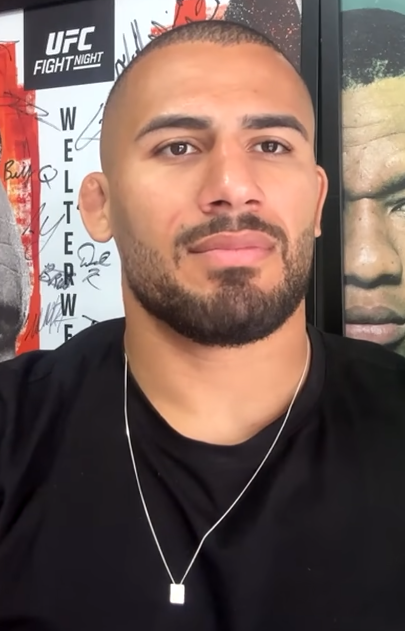
- Petrino in 2026
- Born: Vitor Petrino Malaquias Salvo; August 28, 1997 (age 29); Santa Luzia, Minas Gerais, Brazil
- Nickname: Icão; Cabuloso
- Height: 6 ft 3 in (1.91 m)
- Weight: 249 lb (113 kg)
- Division: Heavyweight; Light Heavyweight
- Reach: 77.5 in (197 cm)
- Fighting out of: Santa Luzia, Minas Gerais, Brazil
- Team: CM System
- Years active: 2019–present

Mixed martial arts record
- Total: 17
- Wins: 15
- By knockout: 8
- By submission: 2
- By decision: 5
- Losses: 2
- By knockout: 1
- By submission: 1

Other information
- Mixed martial arts record from Sherdog

Vitor Petrino Malaquias Salvo (born August 28, 1997) is a Brazilian professional mixed martial artist. He currently competes in the Heavyweight division of the Ultimate Fighting Championship (UFC). As of September 12, 2026, he is #9 in the Meta UFC heavyweight rankings.

== Background ==
Born in Santa Luzia, Minas Gerais, Petrino began his martial arts journey at the age of 13. The first disciplines he devoted himself to were sanda and Chinese boxing, and it was at the age of 18 that he entered the world of amateur MMA.

Petrino worked hard outside the realm of fighting to study and dedicate himself to training. While studying Physical Education, he worked as a salesman, mechanic's assistant, and also worked in a warehouse company.

== Mixed martial arts career ==
=== Early career ===
Petrino made his professional MMA debut facing Rodolfo Bellato at Max Fight 22 in 2019. Petrino won by knockout in 25 seconds. After that fight, he achieved five more victories, including four more knockouts.

=== Dana White's Contender Series ===
On September 6, 2022, Petrino faced Rodolfo Bellato for the second time in his career, for a UFC contract in Dana White's Contender Series: Season 6, Week 7. Petrino won the contract by defeating Bellato via knockout in the second round.

=== Ultimate Fighting Championship ===
Petrino was expected to debut in the UFC on December 17, 2022, at UFC Fight Night 216, facing Tafon Nchukwi. However, Nchukwi withdrew from the fight for unknown reasons.

Petrino made his promotional debut on March 11, 2023, facing Anton Turkalj at UFC Fight Night 221. Petrino won the fight by unanimous decision. This bout earned him his first Fight of the Night award.

Petrino faced Marcin Prachnio on July 8, 2023, at UFC 290. He won the fight by submission in the third round.

Petrino faced Modestas Bukauskas on November 4, 2023, at UFC Fight Night 231. He won the fight by KO in the second round. This bout earned him his first Performance of the Night award.

Petrino faced Tyson Pedro on March 2, 2024, at UFC Fight Night 238. He won the fight by unanimous decision.

Petrino faced Anthony Smith on May 4, 2024, at UFC 301. He lost the fight by submission in the first round.

Petrino faced Dustin Jacoby on December 14, 2024 at UFC on ESPN 63. He lost the fight by knockout via a straight, right punch in the third round.

Petrino was scheduled to face Jhonata Diniz on March 8, 2025, at UFC 313. However, Petrino was forced to withdraw from the fight due to lateral epicondylitis in both elbows.

Petrino made his heavyweight debut against Austen Lane on July 12, 2025, at UFC on ESPN 70. He won the fight via a rear-naked choke submission in the first round.

Petrino faced Thomas Petersen on October 11, 2025, at UFC Fight Night 261. He won the fight by knockout in the third round. This fight earned him another Performance of the Night award.

Petrino was scheduled to face Kennedy Nzechukwu on March 14, 2026 at UFC Fight Night 269. However, Nzechukwu withdrew for undisclosed reasons and was replaced by Steven Asplund. Petrino won the fight by unanimous decision.

Petrino faced Serghei Spivac on August 22, 2026 at UFC Fight Night 285. He won the fight via unanimous decision.

== Championships and accomplishments ==
- Ultimate Fighting Championship
  - Fight of the Night (One time) vs. Anton Turkalj
  - Performance of the Night (Two times) vs. Modestas Bukauskas and Thomas Petersen
- MMA Fighting
  - 2023 Second Team MMA All-Star

== Mixed martial arts record ==
Professional record breakdown
17 matches	15 wins	2 losses
By knockout	8	1
By submission	2	1
By decision	5	0

Res.	Record	Opponent	Method	Event	Date	Round	Time	Location	Notes
Win	15–2	Serghei Spivac	Decision (unanimous)	UFC Fight Night: Hernandez vs. Rodrigues	August 22, 2026	3	5:00	Sacramento, California, United States	
Win	14–2	Steven Asplund	Decision (unanimous)	UFC Fight Night: Emmett vs. Vallejos	March 14, 2026	3	5:00	Las Vegas, Nevada, United States	
Win	13–2	Thomas Petersen	KO (punches)	UFC Fight Night: Oliveira vs. Gamrot	October 11, 2025	3	0:26	Rio de Janeiro, Brazil	Performance of the Night.
Win	12–2	Austen Lane	Submission (rear-naked choke)	UFC on ESPN: Lewis vs. Teixeira	July 12, 2025	1	4:16	Nashville, Tennessee, United States	Heavyweight debut.
Loss	11–2	Dustin Jacoby	KO (punch)	UFC on ESPN: Covington vs. Buckley	December 14, 2024	3	3:44	Tampa, Florida, United States	
Loss	11–1	Anthony Smith	Submission (guillotine choke)	UFC 301	May 4, 2024	1	2:00	Rio de Janeiro, Brazil	
Win	11–0	Tyson Pedro	Decision (unanimous)	UFC Fight Night: Rozenstruik vs. Gaziev	March 2, 2024	3	5:00	Las Vegas, Nevada, United States	
Win	10–0	Modestas Bukauskas	KO (punch)	UFC Fight Night: Almeida vs. Lewis	November 4, 2023	2	1:03	São Paulo, Brazil	Performance of the Night.
Win	9–0	Marcin Prachnio	Submission (arm-triangle choke)	UFC 290	July 8, 2023	3	3:42	Las Vegas, Nevada, United States	
Win	8–0	Anton Turkalj	Decision (unanimous)	UFC Fight Night: Yan vs. Dvalishvili	March 11, 2023	3	5:00	Las Vegas, Nevada, United States	Fight of the Night.
Win	7–0	Rodolfo Bellato	KO (punches)	Dana White's Contender Series 53	September 6, 2022	2	3:36	Las Vegas, Nevada, United States	
Win	6–0	Gadzhimurad Antigulov	KO (punches)	UAE Warriors 22	September 4, 2021	1	3:36	Abu Dhabi, United Arab Emirates	
Win	5–0	Caike Souza	TKO (punches)	Road to Future 2	July 18, 2021	1	4:17	Curitiba, Brazil	
Win	4–0	Fábio Gois	TKO (punches)	Adventure Fighters Tournament 26	February 21, 2021	1	0:45	Curitiba, Brazil	
Win	3–0	Willian Telles	TKO (punches)	Adventure Fighters Tournament 25	November 29, 2020	1	3:06	Curitiba, Brazil	
Win	2–0	Ewerton Polaquini	Decision (unanimous)	Max Fight 23	June 28, 2019	3	5:00	Curitiba, Brazil	
Win	1–0	Rodolfo Bellato	KO (punches)	Max Fight 22	May 3, 2019	1	0:25	Caraguatatuba, Brazil	Light Heavyweight debut.

== See also ==
- List of current UFC fighters
- List of Dana White's Contender Series alumni
- List of male mixed martial artists
