= C. J. Vergara =

American mixed martial artist

CJ Vergara
- Born: Carlos Vergara; June 18, 1991 (age 35); Laredo, Texas, United States
- Height: 5 ft 6 in (1.68 m)
- Weight: 125 lb (57 kg; 8 st 13 lb)
- Division: Flyweight
- Reach: 68 in (173 cm)
- Style: Muay Thai
- Stance: Orthodox
- Fighting out of: San Antonio, Texas
- Team: Pete Spratt Muay Thai
- Trainer: Pete Spratt
- Years active: 2012–present

Mixed martial arts record
- Total: 20
- Wins: 12
- By knockout: 7
- By decision: 5
- Losses: 7
- By knockout: 1
- By submission: 3
- By decision: 3
- Draws: 1

Other information
- Mixed martial arts record from Sherdog

Carlos Vergara (born June 18, 1991) is an American mixed martial artist who competed in the Flyweight division of the Ultimate Fighting Championship (UFC).

== Background ==
Vergara began training in Muay Thai under Pete Spratt at his gym in Texas. He started at age seventeen, driven by a lifelong dream of becoming a UFC fighter. Vergara said he had "always loved hand-to-hand combat" and credited video games like Mortal Kombat for sparking his passion for mixed martial arts. Despite several injuries throughout his career, he remained determined and never gave up.

== Mixed martial arts career ==
=== Early career ===
Vergara made his Mixed Martial Arts debut in 2012, he compiled a record of 8-2 before making his Dana White's Contender Series debut in 2021, throughout his early career he had wins over Jacob Silva, Jose Soto Jr., and more on his resume.

=== Ultimate Fighting Championship ===
Vergara made his Ultimate Fighting Championship debut on November 6, 2021, at UFC 268. At the weigh-ins, Vergara weighed in at 127.4 pounds, 1.4 pounds over the flyweight non-title fight limit. The bout proceeded at a catchweight and he forfeited 20% of his purse to Osbourne. Vergara lost the fight via unanimous decision.

Vergara faced Kleydson Rodrigues on May 7, 2022, at UFC 274, winning the bout via a split decision. After the fight Vergara announced he was doubtful he would get the win due to the fact the fight was very close and assumed he lost the bout.

Vergara faced UFC newcomer Tatsuro Taira on October 15, 2022, at UFC Fight Night: Grasso vs. Araújo. At the weigh-ins, Vergara weighed in at 129 pounds, three pounds over the flyweight non-title fight limit. The bout proceeded at catchweight with Vergara being fined 30% of his purse, which went to his opponent Taira. He lost the bout via armbar in the second round.

Vergara faced Daniel da Silva on March 25, 2023, at UFC Fight Night: Vera vs Sandhagen. After being knocked down in the first, Vergara came back to win the fight via TKO in the second round. This bout earned the Fight of the Night award.

Vergara faced Vinicius Salvador on July 29, 2023 at UFC 291. At the weigh-ins, Vinicius Salvador weighed in at 128.5 pounds, two and a half pounds over the flyweight non-title fight limit. His bout proceeded at catchweight and he was fined 20 percent of his purse, which went to Vergara. He won the bout via unanimous decision.

Vergara faced Asu Almabayev on March 9, 2024, at UFC 299. At the weigh ins, Verara weighed in at 127 pounds, one pound over the flyweight non-title fight limit, which led his bout to proceed at catchweight with 30 percent of his purse going to Almabayev. He lost the fight by unanimous decision marking the third UFC fight he lost after missing weight.

Vergara was scheduled to face Azat Maksum on August 3, 2024 at UFC on ABC 7. However, Maksum withdrew due to an injury and the bout was cancelled.

Vergara faced promotional newcomer Ramazan Temirov on October 12, 2024 at UFC Fight Night 244. He lost the fight by technical knockout in the first round.

Vergara faced Édgar Cháirez on March 29, 2025, at UFC on ESPN 64. He lost the fight via a face crank submission in the first round.

On April 3, 2025, after his third consecutive loss, it was reported that Vergara was removed from the UFC roster.

== Championships and accomplishments ==
=== Mixed martial arts ===
- Ultimate Fighting Championship
  - Fight of the Night (One time) vs. Daniel da Silva
  - UFC Honors Awards
    - 2023: Fan's Choice Comeback of the Year Nominee vs. Daniel da Silva
- Fury Fighting Championship
  - FFC Flyweight Championship (One time)
- GiveMeSport
  - 2023 UFC Comeback Fight of the Year vs. Daniel Lacerda at UFC on ESPN: Vera vs. Sandhagen

== Mixed martial arts record ==
Professional record breakdown
20 matches	12 wins	7 losses
By knockout	7	1
By submission	0	3
By decision	5	3
Draws	1	

Res.	Record	Opponent	Method	Event	Date	Round	Time	Location	Notes
Loss	12–7–1	Édgar Cháirez	Submission (face crank)	UFC on ESPN: Moreno vs. Erceg	March 29, 2025	1	2:30	Mexico City, Mexico	
Loss	12–6–1	Ramazan Temirov	TKO (punches)	UFC Fight Night: Royval vs. Taira	October 12, 2024	1	2:50	Las Vegas, Nevada, United States	
Loss	12–5–1	Asu Almabayev	Decision (unanimous)	UFC 299	March 9, 2024	3	5:00	Miami, Florida, United States	Catchweight (127 lb) bout; Vergara missed weight.
Win	12–4–1	Vinicius Salvador	Decision (unanimous)	UFC 291	July 29, 2023	3	5:00	Salt Lake City, Utah, United States	Catchweight (128.5 lb); Salvador missed weight.
Win	11–4–1	Daniel Lacerda	TKO (punches)	UFC on ESPN: Vera vs. Sandhagen	March 25, 2023	2	4:04	San Antonio, Texas, United States	Fight of the Night.
Loss	10–4–1	Tatsuro Taira	Submission (armbar)	UFC Fight Night: Grasso vs. Araújo	October 15, 2022	2	4:19	Las Vegas Nevada, United States	Catchweight (129 lb) bout; Vergara missed weight.
Win	10–3–1	Kleydson Rodrigues	Decision (split)	UFC 274	May 7, 2022	3	5:00	Phoenix, Arizona, United States	
Loss	9–3–1	Ode' Osbourne	Decision (unanimous)	UFC 268	November 6, 2021	3	5:00	New York City, New York, United States	Catchweight (127.4 lb) bout; Vergara missed weight.
Win	9–2–1	Bruno Korea	KO (knee to the body)	Dana White's Contender Series 38	September 7, 2021	1	0:41	Las Vegas, Nevada, United States	
Win	8–2–1	Jacob Silva	TKO (punches)	Fury FC 44	March 6, 2021	3	2:38	San Antonio, Texas, United States	Won the Fury FC Flyweight Championship.
Win	7–2–1	Shawn Solis	KO (flying knee)	Fury FC 38	October 27, 2019	3	4:05	San Antonio, Texas, United States	Originally for the Fury FC Flyweight Championship, Vergara missed weight (128.2 lbs) and was ineligible to win title.
Win	6–2–1	Emerson Garcia	TKO (punches)	Fury FC: Fight Night San Antonio	June 21, 2019	2	2:30	San Antonio, Texas, United States	Catchweight (130 lb) bout.
Win	5–2–1	Ramiro Ruiz Castillo	TKO (punches)	Fury FC 30	March 3, 2019	1	0:54	Dallas, Texas, United States	
Loss	4–2–1	Devin Miller	Submission (rear-naked choke)	LFA 40	May 25, 2018	1	0:54	Dallas, Texas, United States	Bantamweight bout.
Draw	4–1–1	Emerson Garcia	Draw (majority)	Fury FC 14	November 19, 2016	3	5:00	San Antonio, Texas, United States	
Win	4–1	Jose Soto Jr.	Decision (unanimous)	RFA 41	July 29, 2016	3	5:00	San Antonio, Texas, United States	Catchweight (130 lb) bout.
Loss	3–1	Jonathan Martinez	Decision (split)	Fury FC 3	January 24, 2015	1	2:54	San Antonio, Texas, United States	
Win	3–0	Jonathan Ramirez	TKO (punches)	Legacy FC 23	September 13, 2013	1	2:43	San Antonio, Texas, United States	
Win	2–0	Akira Smith	Decision (unanimous)	Kickass Productions: Crown Center MMA	June 28, 2013	3	3:00	Austin, Texas, United States	Flyweight debut.
Win	1–0	LeRoy Martinez	Decision (unanimous)	ABG Promotions: Alamo Showdown 5	November 17, 2012	3	3:00	San Antonio, Texas, United States	Bantamweight debut.

== See also ==
- List of male mixed martial artists
