= Ramazan Temirov =

Uzbek mixed martial artist

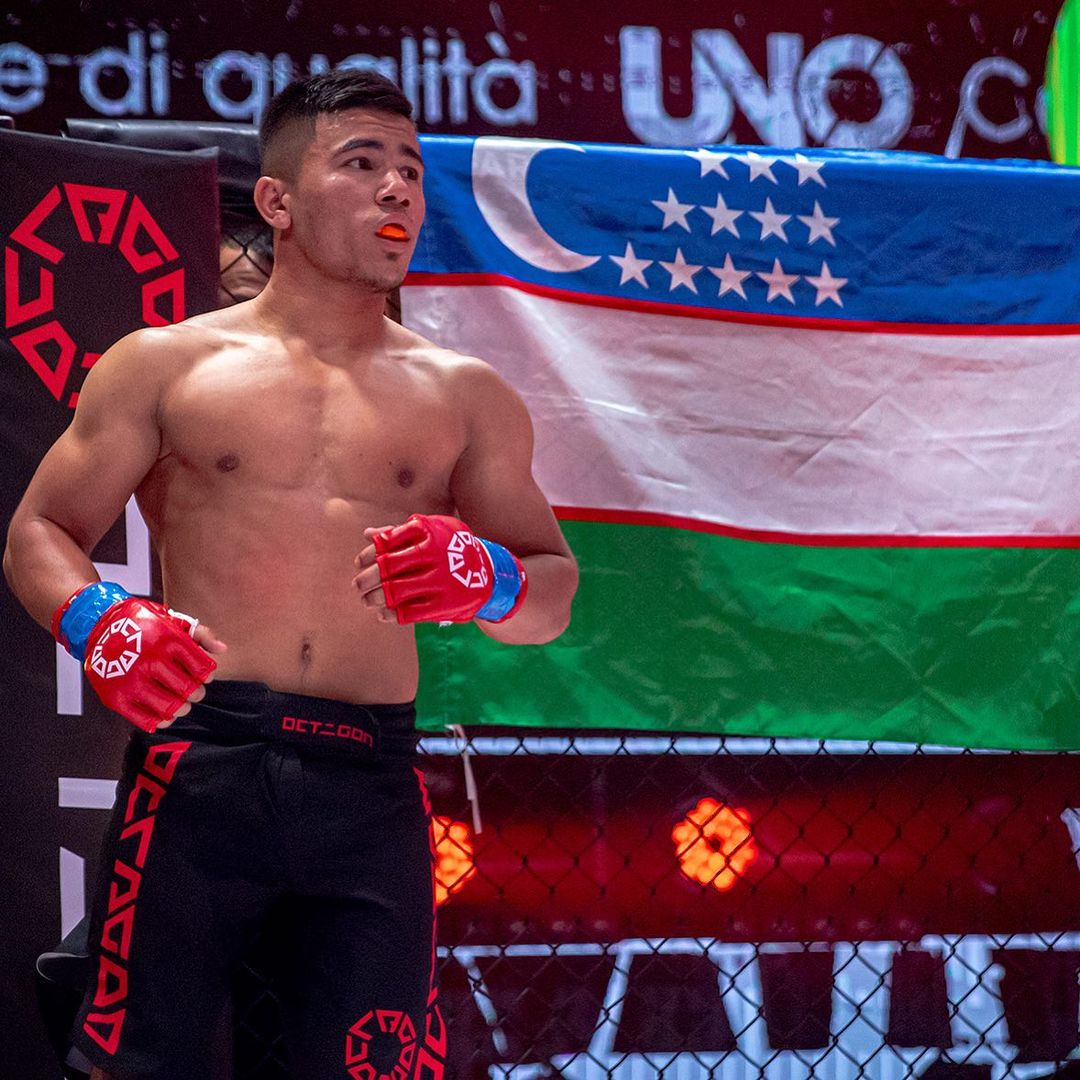
- Temirov in 2021
- Born: Ramazonbek Yuldosh o‘gli Temirov; January 31, 1997 (age 29); Qarshi, Qashqadaryo Region, Uzbekistan
- Native name: Рамазонбек Темиров
- Nickname: Temurlan
- Height: 5 ft 4 in (1.63 m)
- Weight: 125 lb (57 kg; 8.9 st)
- Division: Flyweight
- Reach: 63 in (160 cm)
- Fighting out of: Qarshi, Uzbekistan
- Team: Muradov Legion Team
- Trainer: Jasur Alijanov
- Years active: 2015–present

Mixed martial arts record
- Total: 24
- Wins: 20
- By knockout: 12
- By submission: 1
- By decision: 7
- Losses: 4
- By knockout: 1
- By submission: 1
- By decision: 2

Other information
- Mixed martial arts record from Sherdog
- Last updated on: October 13, 2026

Ramazonbek Yuldosh o‘gli “Ramazan” Temirov (born 31 January 1997) is an Uzbek professional mixed martial artist currently competing in the flyweight division of the Ultimate Fighting Championship (UFC). As of October 24, 2026, he is #10 in the Meta UFC flyweight rankings.

== Early life ==
Temirov began training in hand-to-hand combat and karate in 2006. In 2017, he won the Asian Championship in hand-to-hand combat.

== Professional career ==
Temirov made his professional debut in 2015 at Emperor Fighting Championship 10 in Tyumen, Russia, defeating Saykhan Elmurzaev by TKO. He later competed in Gorilla Fighting Championship, Muradov Professional League, and Rizin.

=== Ultimate Fighting Championship ===
Temirov made his UFC debut on October 12, 2024 at UFC Fight Night 244, facing C.J. Vergara. He defeated Vergara via first-round TKO. This bout earned him a Performance of the Night award.

Temirov faced Charles Johnson on March 1, 2025 at UFC Fight Night 253. He won via unanimous decision.

Temirov was scheduled to Asu Almabayev on July 26, 2025, at UFC on ABC 9. However, Temirov pulled out due to failing a drug test as a result of taking a prohibited substance while treating a festering leg infection in early July and was replaced by Jose Ochoa. It was later revealed that he tested positive for trimetazidine and was suspended by Combat Sports Anti-Doping (CSAD) for one year retroactive to July 5, 2025.

Temirov faced former UFC Flyweight Championship challenger Steve Erceg on July 25, 2026 at UFC Fight Night 282. He won via knockout in the first round. This bout would earn him a Performance of the Night award.

Temirov faced Lone'er Kavanagh on October 24, 2026 at UFC 333. He lost the fight by technical knockout in the first round.

== Championships and accomplishments ==
=== Mixed martial arts ===
- Ultimate Fighting Championship
  - Performance of the Night (Two times) vs. C.J. Vergara and Steve Erceg

== Mixed martial arts record ==
Professional record breakdown
24 matches	20 wins	4 losses
By knockout	12	1
By submission	1	1
By decision	7	2

Res.	Record	Opponent	Method	Event	Date	Round	Time	Location	Notes
Loss	20–4	Lone'er Kavanagh	TKO (punches)	UFC 333	October 24, 2026	1	4:28	Abu Dhabi, United Arab Emirates	
Win	20–3	Steve Erceg	KO (punch)	UFC Fight Night: Ankalaev vs. Guskov	July 25, 2026	1	4:21	Abu Dhabi, United Arab Emirates	Performance of the Night.
Win	19–3	Charles Johnson	Decision (unanimous)	UFC Fight Night: Kape vs. Almabayev	March 1, 2025	3	5:00	Las Vegas, Nevada, United States	
Win	18–3	C.J. Vergara	TKO (punches)	UFC Fight Night: Royval vs. Taira	October 12, 2024	1	2:50	Las Vegas, Nevada, United States	Performance of the Night.
Win	17–3	Takaki Soya	KO (punches)	Rizin 44	September 24, 2023	1	3:15	Saitama, Japan	
Win	16–3	Yuta Hamamoto	TKO (punches)	Rizin 42	May 6, 2023	1	4:06	Tokyo, Japan	
Win	15–3	Kayck Alencar	TKO (punches)	Naiza FC 48	November 21, 2022	1	1:50	Aktobe, Kazakhstan	
Win	14–3	Argen Maratbek uulu	TKO (punches)	Muradov Professional League 5	May 21, 2022	1	4:27	Kokand, Uzbekistan	
Win	13–3	Mikhail Sirbu	Decision (unanimous)	Muradov Professional League 3	February 27, 2022	3	5:00	Tashkent, Uzbekistan	
Win	12–3	Talgat Zhumagaliev	Decision (unanimous)	Muradov Professional League 1	October 22, 2021	3	5:00	Tashkent, Uzbekistan	Featherweight bout.
Win	11–3	Daniel Conceição	KO (punch)	Future MMA 13	September 24, 2021	1	0:34	Santa Luzia, Brazil	Return to Flyweight.
Win	10–3	Satbek Esengeldin	Decision (Unanimous)	Octagon 19	May 28, 2021	3	5:00	Almaty, Kazakhstan	
Win	9–3	Shodavlat Sultonmurodov	Submission (armbar)	Uzbekistan MMA Association: Kokand Mayor Cup	April 8, 2021	1	2:11	Tashkent, Uzbekistan	Return to Bantamweight.
Loss	8–3	Talgat Zhumagaliyev	Submission (armbar)	GFC 17	September 27, 2019	2	3:17	Atyrau, Kazakhstan	
Loss	8–2	Qiu Jilunzhou	Decision (unanimous)	WLF W.A.R.S. 31	January 3, 2019	3	5:00	Zhengzhou, China	
Win	8–1	Qiu Biqie	Decision (unanimous)	WLF W.A.R.S. 24	May 11, 2018	3	5:00	Zhengzhou, China	Strawweight bout.
Win	7–1	Narik Tonyan	Decision (majority)	Legion FC: Universal Battle 1	February 8, 2018	3	5:00	Tashkent, Uzbekistan	Flyweight debut.
Win	6–1	Xie Longlong	TKO (punches)	WLF W.A.R.S. 21	January 13, 2018	2	1:05	Zhengzhou, China	
Loss	5–1	Sanlang Gexi	Decision (unanimous)	WLF W.A.R.S. 20	December 16, 2017	3	5:00	Zhengzhou, China	
Win	5–0	Li Zhe	TKO (punches)	WLF W.A.R.S. 20	December 16, 2017	2	0:54	Zhengzhou, China	Return to Strawweight.
Win	4–0	Alexey Krutoy	Decision (unanimous)	Legion FC: Universal Battle Among Professional	July 30, 2017	3	5:00	Tashkent, Uzbekistan	Bantamweight debut.
Win	3–0	Ru Ze	TKO (unches)	WLF W.A.R.S. 11	March 3, 2017	1	4:29	Chenzhou, China	
Win	2–0	Sun Laqie	KO (head kick)	WLF W.A.R.S. 10	November 26, 2016	1	0:44	Zhengzhou, China	Strawweight debut.
Win	1–0	Saykhan Elmurzaev	TKO (punches)	Emperor FC 10	December 19, 2015	1	2:25	Tyumen, Russia	Featherweight debut.

== See also ==
- List of current UFC fighters
- List of male mixed martial artists
