= UFC Fight Night: Emmett vs. Vallejos =

Mixed martial arts event in 2026

- The poster for UFC Fight Night: Emmett vs. Vallejos
- Promotion: Ultimate Fighting Championship
- Date: March 14, 2026
- Venue: Meta Apex
- City: Enterprise, Nevada, United States
- Attendance: Not announced

Event chronology
UFC 326: Holloway vs. Oliveira 2	UFC Fight Night: Emmett vs. Vallejos	UFC Fight Night: Evloev vs. Murphy

UFC Fight Night: Emmett vs. Vallejos (also known as UFC Fight Night 269 and UFC Vegas 114) was a mixed martial arts event produced by the Ultimate Fighting Championship that took place on March 14, 2026, at the Meta Apex in Enterprise, Nevada, part of the Las Vegas Valley, United States.

== Background ==
A featherweight bout between former interim UFC Featherweight Championship challenger Josh Emmett and Kevin Vallejos headlined the event. With Vallejos at age 24 and Emmett at 41, the headliner featured an age difference of 16 years, 9 months and 4 days — the largest ever for a UFC main event. This was later surpassed in September 2026 at UFC Fight Night: Rosas Jr. vs. Barcelos, where the age gap was 17 years, 5 months and 7 days.

A women's strawweight bout between former UFC Women's Strawweight Championship challenger Amanda Lemos and Gillian Robertson was originally expected to take place at UFC on ESPN: Royval vs. Kape in December 2025, but Lemos was removed from the bout by the Nevada Athletic Commission on the day of the event due to a mouth injury. They met at this event instead.

A heavyweight bout between Kennedy Nzechukwu and Vitor Petrino was originally scheduled for this event. However, Nzechukwu withdrew for undisclosed reasons and was replaced by Steven Asplund.

A flyweight bout between Bruno Gustavo da Silva and Lone'er Kavanagh was scheduled for this event. However, Kavanagh withdrew to headline UFC Fight Night: Moreno vs. Kavanagh two weeks earlier on February 28. Former LFA Flyweight Champion Charles Johnson then stepped in to face Silva.

A bantamweight bout between Road to UFC Season 1 bantamweight winner Rinya Nakamura and Luan Lacerda was scheduled for this event. However, Nakamura withdrew for undisclosed reasons and was replaced by promotional newcomer Hecher Sosa.

== Results ==
Main card (Paramount+)
Weight class				Method	Round	Time	Notes
Featherweight	Kevin Vallejos	def.	Josh Emmett	TKO (knees and punches)	1	3:33
Women's Strawweight	Gillian Robertson	def.	Amanda Lemos	Decision (unanimous) (29–28, 29–28, 29–28)	3	5:00
Featherweight	José Miguel Delgado	def.	Andre Fili	Decision (split) (29–28, 28–29, 29–28)	3	5:00
Featherweight	Marwan Rahiki	def.	Harry Hardwick	TKO (jaw injury)	2	5:00
Light Heavyweight	Ion Cuțelaba	def.	Oumar Sy	Submission (guillotine choke)	1	4:24
Flyweight	Charles Johnson	def.	Bruno Gustavo da Silva	Decision (split) (29–28, 28–29, 30–27)	3	5:00
Preliminary card (Paramount+)
Welterweight	Myktybek Orolbai	def.	Chris Curtis	Decision (unanimous) (30–27, 30–27, 30–27)	3	5:00
Heavyweight	Vitor Petrino	def.	Steven Asplund	Decision (unanimous) (29–28, 29–28, 29–28)	3	5:00
Bantamweight	Elijah Smith	def.	You Su-young	Submission (rear-naked choke)	2	1:04
Lightweight	Manoel Sousa	def.	Bolaji Oki	KO (punch)	3	4:12
Middleweight	Eryk Anders	def.	Brad Tavares	Decision (unanimous) (30–27, 29–28, 29–28)	3	5:00
Women's Bantamweight	Beatriz Mesquita	def.	Montserrat Rendon	Submission (rear-naked choke)	1	2:07
Bantamweight	Hecher Sosa	def.	Luan Lacerda	Decision (unanimous) (30–27, 30–27, 29–28)	3	5:00
Women's Strawweight	Piera Rodríguez	def.	Sam Hughes	Decision (unanimous) (30–27, 30–27, 30–27)	3	5:00

== Bonus awards ==
The following fighters received $100,000 bonuses. The other finishes received $25,000 additional bonuses.

- Fight of the Night: Marwan Rahiki vs. Harry Hardwick
- Performance of the Night: Kevin Vallejos and Manoel Sousa

== See also ==
- 2026 in UFC
- List of current UFC fighters
- List of UFC events
