= Steve Erceg =

Australian mixed martial artist (born 1995)

- Born: Stephen Vincenzo Erceg; July 27, 1995 (age 31); Perth, Australia
- Other names: Astro Boy
- Height: 5 ft 8 in (1.73 m)
- Weight: 125 lb (57 kg; 8 st 13 lb)
- Division: Flyweight (2016–present); Bantamweight (2019, 2021, 2025)
- Reach: 68 in (173 cm)
- Fighting out of: Perth, Western Australia, Australia
- Team: Wilkes MMA
- Years active: 2016–present

Mixed martial arts record
- Total: 19
- Wins: 14
- By knockout: 2
- By submission: 6
- By decision: 6
- Losses: 5
- By knockout: 3
- By decision: 2

Other information
- Mixed martial arts record from Sherdog

Stephen Vincenzo Erceg (born July 27, 1995) is an Australian professional mixed martial artist. He currently competes in the Flyweight division of the Ultimate Fighting Championship (UFC). As of June 20, 2026, he is #13 in the Meta UFC flyweight rankings.

== Early life ==
Erceg was born in Perth, Western Australia into a family of Croatian and Italian descent. He attended Corpus Christi College throughout his upbringing and has stated he was a "big WWE fan" in his younger years. His interest in professional wrestling led to discovering mixed martial arts when he watched Brock Lesnar compete against Frank Mir at UFC 81 and subsequently decided to begin MMA training at his local gym. Along with mixed martial arts, Erceg has competed in muay thai and Brazilian jiu jitsu competitions as well as winning a gold medal in the 65 kg division at the Australian national freestyle wrestling championships.

== Mixed martial arts career ==
=== Early career ===
Starting his career in 2016, Erceg fought in Australian promotions such as Hex Fighting Series and Eternal MMA, winning the flyweight title in the latter and compiling an 9–1 record before signing with the UFC.

=== Ultimate Fighting Championship ===
Erceg was scheduled to face Clayton Carpenter at the sixth season of Dana White's Contender Series in 2022 and UFC Fight Night 223 in May 2023, but Erceg pulled out both times due to visa issues. The bout had been rebooked for UFC on ESPN 48 on July 1, 2023, but it was scrapped after Carpenter pulled out due to an undisclosed injury.

Making his UFC debut, Erceg faced David Dvořák on June 10, 2023, at UFC 289, replacing Matt Schnell. In an upset, he won the bout via unanimous decision. The win also earned Erceg his first Performance of the Night bonus award.

Erceg was scheduled to face Matt Schnell on November 11, 2023, at UFC 295. However, Schnell withdrew from the bout for unknown reasons and was replaced by Alessandro Costa. Erceg won the bout by unanimous decision.

The bout with Matt Schnell was rescheduled on March 2, 2024, at UFC Fight Night 238. Erceg won the bout in the second round by a left-hook knockout. This fight earned him the Performance of the Night award.

Erceg faced Alexandre Pantoja for the UFC Flyweight Championship on May 4, 2024, at UFC 301. He lost the fight by unanimous decision.

Erceg faced Kai Kara-France on August 18, 2024, at UFC 305. He lost the fight by technical knockout in the first round.

Erceg was scheduled to face Asu Almabayev on March 1, 2025 at UFC Fight Night 253. However, Erceg was pulled from the bout in order to compete in the main event against former two-time UFC Flyweight Champion Brandon Moreno on April 5, 2025 at UFC on ESPN 64. Erceg lost to Moreno by unanimous decision.

Erceg was scheduled to face former UFC Flyweight Championship challenger Alex Perez on August 9, 2025 at UFC on ESPN 72. However, Perez pulled out in mid-July due to undisclosed reasons and was replaced by Road to UFC Season 1 flyweight winner Park Hyun-sung. In turn, Park was moved off the card to serve as a replacement fighter the week before and was subsequently replaced by Ode' Osbourne in a bantamweight bout. Erceg won the fight via unanimous decision.

Erceg faced Tim Elliott on May 2, 2026 at UFC Fight Night 275. He won the fight via unanimous decision.

Erceg faced Ramazan Temirov on July 25, 2026 in the co-main event at UFC Fight Night 282. He lost the fight by knockout in the first round.

== Personal life ==
Erceg's nickname 'Astroboy' comes from Erceg's resemblance in his younger years to the Japanese manga character.

== Championships and accomplishments ==
=== Mixed martial arts ===
- Ultimate Fighting Championship
  - Performance of the Night (Two times) vs. David Dvořák and Matt Schnell
  - UFC.com Awards
    - 2023: Ranked #5 Newcomer of the Year
- Eternal MMA
  - Eternal MMA Flyweight Championship (One time)
    - One successful title defense

== Mixed martial arts record ==
Professional record breakdown
| 19 matches | 14 wins | 5 losses |
| By knockout | 2 | 2 |
| By submission | 6 | 0 |
| By decision | 6 | 3 |

| Res. | Record | Opponent | Method | Event | Date | Round | Time | Location | Notes |
|---|---|---|---|---|---|---|---|---|---|
| Loss | 14–5 | Ramazan Temirov | KO (punch) | UFC Fight Night: Ankalaev vs. Guskov | July 25, 2026 | 1 | 4:21 | Abu Dhabi, United Arab Emirates | |
| Win | 14–4 | Tim Elliott | Decision (unanimous) | UFC Fight Night: Della Maddalena vs. Prates | May 2, 2026 | 3 | 5:00 | Perth, Australia | |
| Win | 13–4 | Ode' Osbourne | Decision (unanimous) | UFC on ESPN: Dolidze vs. Hernandez | August 9, 2025 | 3 | 5:00 | Las Vegas, Nevada, United States | Bantamweight bout. |
| Loss | 12–4 | Brandon Moreno | Decision (unanimous) | UFC on ESPN: Moreno vs. Erceg | March 29, 2025 | 5 | 5:00 | Mexico City, Mexico | |
| Loss | 12–3 | Kai Kara-France | TKO (punches) | UFC 305 | August 18, 2024 | 1 | 4:04 | Perth, Australia | |
| Loss | 12–2 | Alexandre Pantoja | Decision (unanimous) | UFC 301 | May 4, 2024 | 5 | 5:00 | Rio de Janeiro, Brazil | For the UFC Flyweight Championship. |
| Win | 12–1 | Matt Schnell | KO (punch) | UFC Fight Night: Rozenstruik vs. Gaziev | March 2, 2024 | 2 | 0:26 | Las Vegas, Nevada, United States | Performance of the Night. |
| Win | 11–1 | Alessandro Costa | Decision (unanimous) | UFC 295 | November 11, 2023 | 3 | 5:00 | New York City, New York, United States | |
| Win | 10–1 | David Dvořák | Decision (unanimous) | UFC 289 | June 10, 2023 | 3 | 5:00 | Vancouver, British Columbia, Canada | Performance of the Night. |
| Win | 9–1 | Soichiro Hirai | Submission (rear-naked choke) | Eternal MMA 73 | February 11, 2023 | 1 | 1:46 | Perth, Australia | |
| Win | 8–1 | Paul Loga | Submission (guillotine choke) | Eternal MMA 62 | October 30, 2021 | 1 | 2:31 | Perth, Australia | Defended the Eternal MMA Flyweight Championship. |
| Win | 7–1 | Cody Haddon | Decision (unanimous) | Eternal MMA 60 | June 5, 2021 | 3 | 5:00 | Perth, Australia | Bantamweight bout. |
| Win | 6–1 | Shannon Ross | Submission (rear-naked choke) | Eternal MMA 52 | March 7, 2020 | 1 | 4:28 | Gold Coast, Australia | Won the Eternal MMA Flyweight Championship. |
| Win | 5–1 | Paul Loga | KO (punch) | Eternal MMA 47 | September 7, 2019 | 1 | 1:31 | Perth, Australia | |
| Win | 4–1 | Tim Moore | Submission (rear-naked choke) | Eternal MMA 45 | May 25, 2019 | 3 | 3:15 | Southport, Australia | Return to Flyweight. |
| Win | 3–1 | Mark Familiari | Submission (rear-naked choke) | Eternal MMA 41 | March 2, 2019 | 1 | 4:15 | Perth, Australia | Bantamweight debut. |
| Win | 2–1 | Choi Seung-guk | Decision (unanimous) | Hex Fight Series 15 | July 21, 2018 | 3 | 5:00 | Northbridge, Australia | |
| Loss | 1–1 | Sean Gauci | Decision (unanimous) | Hex Fight Series 11 | September 1, 2017 | 3 | 5:00 | Melbourne, Australia | |
| Win | 1–0 | Ryan Robertson | Submission (guillotine choke) | CDL Promotions: Super Card | February 12, 2016 | 2 | N/A | Perth, Australia | Flyweight debut. |

== Pay-per-view bouts ==
| No | Event | Fight | Date | Venue | City | PPV buys |
|---|---|---|---|---|---|---|
| 1. | UFC 301 | Pantoja vs. Erceg | May 4, 2024 | Farmasi Arena | Rio de Janeiro, Brazil | Not Disclosed |

== See also ==
- List of current UFC fighters
- List of male mixed martial artists
