= Édgar Cháirez =

Mexican mixed martial artist (born 1996)

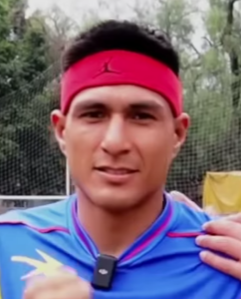
- Cháirez in 2024
- Born: Édgar José Cháirez Ayala; January 27, 1996 (age 30); Mexicali, Baja California, Mexico
- Nickname: Puro Chicali (Pure Mexicali)
- Height: 5 ft 7 in (1.70 m)
- Weight: 125 lb (57 kg; 8 st 13 lb)
- Division: Flyweight
- Reach: 71 in (180 cm)
- Fighting out of: Tijuana, Baja California, Mexico
- Team: Entram Gym
- Years active: 2016–present

Mixed martial arts record
- Total: 22
- Wins: 14
- By knockout: 4
- By submission: 9
- By decision: 1
- Losses: 7
- By submission: 2
- By decision: 5
- No contests: 1

Other information
- Mixed martial arts record from Sherdog

Édgar José Cháirez Ayala (born January 27, 1996) is a Mexican professional mixed martial artist who currently competes in the Flyweight division of Ultimate Fighting Championship (UFC).

== Mixed martial arts career ==
=== Combate Americas ===
On March 30, 2017, Cháirez faced Oscar Quintero in his Combate Americas debut and won by submission in the first round. Three months later, he faced Erick Villaluz Orellano at Combate Americas 15 and again won by submission, this time in just 18 seconds.

Cháirez subsequently had six more fights, winning four and losing two. Among those victories, his win against Mefi Monterroso on April 9, 2021, stands out.

=== Fights in UWC, Naciones and Fury FC ===
In addition to his time in Combate, he had fights scheduled in the Mexican promotions Ultimate Warrior Challenge Mexico and Naciones MMA. In one of those fights, Cháirez faced Jesús Santos Aguilar for the UWC Flyweight Championship at UWC Mexico 23, though he was defeated by submission in the final round.

On March 24, 2023, Cháirez faced Gianni Vázquez in the main event of Fury FC 76. He redeemed himself after his UWC defeat, securing a fourth-round victory by submitting Vázquez with an armbar. The fight garnered media attention due to an officiating incident, in which the referee failed to notice that Vázquez had been rendered unconscious by the armbar just before Cháirez transitioned to a regular armbar after he regained consciousness.

=== Ultimate Fighting Championship ===
Cháirez made his promotional debut on July 8, 2023, at UFC 290 against Tatsuro Taira in a catchweight bout at 130 pounds. He lost the fight by unanimous decision.

Cháirez faced Daniel Lacerda on September 16, 2023, at UFC Fight Night 227. He initially won the fight by submitting Lacerda with a rear-naked choke, but the result was changed to a no contest due to a referee error, which sparked controversy.

Cháirez was expected to face Daniel Lacerda again at UFC Fight Night 230, but the fight was canceled due to Lacerda's medical issues after the weigh-in. The rematch was rescheduled for February 24, 2024, at UFC Fight Night 237. At the weigh ins, both fighters missed weight with Cháirez weighing in at 131 pounds and Lacerda at 127 pounds, five pounds and one pound over the flyweight non-title fight limit, respectively. The bout proceeded at catchweight, where Cháirez won via submission in the first round.

Cháirez was scheduled to face Kevin Borjas on September 14, 2024, at UFC 306, but weeks prior, it was announced that Joshua Van would take Borjas's place for unknown reasons. He lost the fight by unanimous decision.

Cháirez faced C.J. Vergara on March 29, 2025, at UFC on ESPN 64. He won the fight by submission in the first round. This victory earned him the Performance of the Night award.

Cháirez was scheduled to face Alessandro Costa on September 13, 2025, at UFC Fight Night 259. However, he withdrew from the card due to injury, and Alden Coira took his place.

Cháirez faced Felipe Bunes on February 28, 2026, at UFC Fight Night 268. He won the fight by split decision.

Cháirez faced Bruno Gustavo da Silva on June 6, 2026 at UFC Fight Night 278. He won the fight via a neck crank submission in the first round. This fight earned him a $100,000 Performance of the Night award.

Cháirez faced Tim Elliott in a 130 pound catchweight bout on September 12, 2026 at UFC Fight Night 288. He lost the fight by unanimous decision.

== Personal life ==
Cháirez has also shown his passion for football and is a fan of Club América.

== Championships and accomplishments ==
- Ultimate Fighting Championship
  - Performance of the Night (Two times) vs. C.J. Vergara and Bruno Gustavo da Silva

== Mixed martial arts record ==
Professional record breakdown
22 matches	14 wins	7 losses
By knockout	4	0
By submission	9	2
By decision	1	5
No contests	1	

Res.	Record	Opponent	Method	Event	Date	Round	Time	Location	Notes
Loss	14–7 (1)	Tim Elliott	Decision (unanimous)	UFC Fight Night: Silva vs. Delgado	September 12, 2026	3	5:00	Glendale, Arizona, United States	Catchweight (130 lb) bout.
Win	14–6 (1)	Bruno Gustavo da Silva	Submission (rear-naked choke)	UFC Fight Night: Muhammad vs. Bonfim	June 6, 2026	1	4:13	Las Vegas, Nevada, United States	Performance of the Night.
Win	13–6 (1)	Felipe Bunes	Decision (split)	UFC Fight Night: Moreno vs. Kavanagh	February 28, 2026	3	5:00	Mexico City, Mexico	
Win	12–6 (1)	C.J. Vergara	Submission (face crank)	UFC on ESPN: Moreno vs. Erceg	March 29, 2025	1	2:30	Mexico City, Mexico	Performance of the Night.
Loss	11–6 (1)	Joshua Van	Decision (unanimous)	UFC 306	September 14, 2024	3	5:00	Las Vegas, Nevada, United States	
Win	11–5 (1)	Daniel Lacerda	Submission (triangle choke)	UFC Fight Night: Moreno vs. Royval 2	February 24, 2024	1	2:17	Mexico City, Mexico	Catchweight (131 lb) bout; both fighters missed weight.
NC	10–5 (1)	Daniel Lacerda	NC (premature stoppage)	UFC Fight Night: Grasso vs. Shevchenko 2	September 16, 2023	1	3:47	Las Vegas, Nevada, United States	Originally a technical submission (anaconda choke) win for Cháirez; overturned after review due to a referee error.
Loss	10–5	Tatsuro Taira	Decision (unanimous)	UFC 290	July 8, 2023	3	5:00	Las Vegas, Nevada, United States	Catchweight (130 lb) bout.
Win	10–4	Gianni Vázquez	Submission (armbar)	Fury FC 76	March 24, 2023	4	2:04	San Antonio, Texas, United States	
Win	9–4	Roberto Guerrero	Submission (guillotine choke)	UWC Mexico 40	November 25, 2022	1	1:03	Tijuana, Mexico	
Loss	8–4	Clayton Carpenter	Decision (unanimous)	Dana White's Contender Series 49	August 9, 2022	3	5:00	Las Vegas, Nevada, United States	
Win	8–3	Ivan Hernandez Flores	TKO (punches)	Naciones MMA 3	January 21, 2022	1	1:47	Tijuana, Mexico	
Win	7–3	Mefi Monterroso	TKO (body kick and punches)	Combate Global: Chairez vs. Monterroso	April 9, 2021	2	0:10	Miami, Florida, United States	
Loss	6–3	Jesús Santos Aguilar	Submission (guillotine choke)	UWC Mexico 23	September 4, 2020	5	4:41	Tijuana, Mexico	For the UWC Flyweight Championship.
Win	6–2	David Macias Ruiz	Submission (rear-naked choke)	Combate Americas 55	February 20, 2020	2	3:58	Mexicali, Mexico	
Loss	5–2	Alberto Trujillo	Decision (unanimous)	Combate Americas 44	September 20, 2019	3	5:00	Mexicali, Mexico	
Win	5–1	Alejandro Salazar	Submission (armbar)	Combate Americas 30	February 8, 2019	1	3:12	Mexicali, Mexico	
Loss	4–1	Axel Osuna	Submission (triangle armbar)	Combate Americas 27	October 26, 2018	2	3:57	Guadalajara, Mexico	
Win	4–0	Alan Cantu Garcia	TKO (spinning back elbow and punches)	Combate Americas 23	May 18, 2018	1	2:58	Tijuana, Mexico	
Win	3–0	Erick Villaluz Orellano	Submission (armbar)	Combate Americas 15	June 30, 2017	1	0:18	Mexico City, Mexico	
Win	2–0	Oscar Quintero	Submission (triangle choke)	Combate Americas 12	March 30, 2017	1	1:19	Tijuana, Mexico	
Win	1–0	Enrique Diarte	KO (flying knee)	Warrior CF 8	December 3, 2016	1	0:45	Mexicali, Mexico	Flyweight debut.

== See also ==
- List of current UFC fighters
- List of male mixed martial artists
- List of Mexican UFC fighters
