= Lone'er Kavanagh =

British mixed martial artist (born 1999)

Lone'er Kavanagh 龍儿
- Born: 9 June 1999 (age 27); London, England
- Height: 5 ft 6 in (168 cm)
- Weight: 125 lb (57 kg; 8 st 13 lb)
- Division: Flyweight
- Reach: 67 in (170 cm)
- Stance: Orthodox
- Fighting out of: London, England
- Team: Great Britain Top Team
- Rank: Black belt in kickboxing Purple belt in Brazilian Jiu-Jitsu
- Years active: 2019–present

Mixed martial arts record
- Total: 13
- Wins: 11
- By knockout: 5
- By submission: 1
- By decision: 5
- Losses: 2
- By knockout: 1
- By submission: 1

Other information
- Mixed martial arts record from Sherdog

Lone'er (Note: pronounced "Lonny") Kavanagh (Chinese: 龍儿; born 9 June 1999) is a English professional mixed martial artist currently competing in the Flyweight division of the Ultimate Fighting Championship (UFC). He trains out of Great Britain Top Team in London. As of 24 October 2026, he is #5 in the Meta UFC flyweight rankings.

== Early life ==
Kavanagh earned a degree in sports science and previously worked as a coach and personal trainer.

== Mixed martial arts career ==
=== Cage Warriors ===
Kavanagh competed extensively for Cage Warriors, he made his promotional debut at Cage Warriors 134 in March 2022, earning a third-round knockout victory over Ryan Morgan via punches.

He followed this performance with a unanimous decision win against Ander Sanchez at Cage Warriors 141 in July 2022. In March 2023, Kavanagh scored a highlight-reel victory at Cage Warriors 150, defeating Davide Scarano via technical knockout from a spinning back kick and punches in the third round.

Kavanagh returned to the promotion in March 2024 at Cage Warriors 169 in London, where he earned a unanimous decision victory over Shawn Marcos da Silva, extending his unbeaten professional record at the time to 6-0.

=== Dana White's Contender Series ===
Kavanagh competed for a UFC contract on Dana White's Contender Series season 8 in 2024. In the opening fight of Season 8, Week 1 on 13 August 2024, he faced undefeated prospect An Tuan Ho. He won the fight via first-round knockout and was awarded a contract by Dana White.

=== Ultimate Fighting Championship ===
Following his DWCS success, Kavanagh made his UFC debut on 23 November 2024, at UFC Fight Night 248 against Jose Ochoa, winning by unanimous decision.

Kavanagh would next face Felipe dos Santos on 22 March 2025, at UFC Fight Night 255 where he earned another unanimous decision win.

Kavanagh suffered the first loss of his professional career on 23 August 2025, being knocked out by Charles Johnson in the second round at UFC Fight Night 257.

Kavanagh was scheduled to face Bruno Silva at UFC Fight Night 269. However, he was pulled from this fight to replace an injured Asu Almabayev to face former two-time champion Brandon Moreno in the main event of UFC Fight Night 268 on 28 February 2026. Kavanagh won the fight by unanimous decision. This fight earned him his first $100,000 Performance of the Night award.

Kavanagh faced Brandon Royval on 11 July 2026 at UFC 329. He lost the fight via a rear-naked choke submission in the third round. This fight earned him a $100,000 Fight of the Night award.

Kavanagh faced Ramazan Temirov on 24 October 2026 at UFC 333. He won the fight by technical knockout in the first round. This fight earned him a $100,000 Performance of the Night award.

== Personal life ==
Kavanagh lives in London. Kavanagh's father was Irish and died when he was six years old. His mother is Chinese, as is the origin of his first name "Lone'er", which translates to "Dragon Son".

== Championships and accomplishments ==
=== Mixed martial arts ===
- Ultimate Fighting Championship
  - Fight of the Night (One time) vs. Brandon Royval
  - Performance of the Night (Two times) vs. Brandon Moreno and Ramazan Temirov

== Mixed martial arts record ==
Professional record breakdown
13 matches	11 wins	2 losses
By knockout	5	1
By submission	1	1
By decision	5	0

Res.	Record	Opponent	Method	Event	Date	Round	Time	Location	Notes
Win	11–2	Ramazan Temirov	TKO (punches)	UFC 333	24 October 2026	1	4:28	Abu Dhabi, United Arab Emirates	Performance of the Night.
Loss	10–2	Brandon Royval	Submission (rear-naked choke)	UFC 329	11 July 2026	3	3:40	Las Vegas, Nevada, United States	Fight of the Night.
Win	10–1	Brandon Moreno	Decision (unanimous)	UFC Fight Night: Moreno vs. Kavanagh	28 February 2026	5	5:00	Mexico City, Mexico	Performance of the Night.
Loss	9–1	Charles Johnson	KO (punch)	UFC Fight Night: Walker vs. Zhang	23 August 2025	2	4:35	Shanghai, China	
Win	9–0	Felipe dos Santos	Decision (unanimous)	UFC Fight Night: Edwards vs. Brady	22 March 2025	3	5:00	London, England	
Win	8–0	Jose Ochoa	Decision (unanimous)	UFC Fight Night: Yan vs. Figueiredo	23 November 2024	3	5:00	Macau, SAR, China	
Win	7–0	An Tuan Ho	KO (punch)	Dana White's Contender Series 67	13 August 2024	1	2:35	Las Vegas, Nevada, United States	
Win	6–0	Shawn Marcos da Silva	Decision (unanimous)	Cage Warriors 169	30 March 2024	3	5:00	London, England	
Win	5–0	Davide Scarano	TKO (spinning back kick and punches)	Cage Warriors 150	17 March 2023	3	0:58	London, England	
Win	4–0	Ander Sanchez	Decision (unanimous)	Cage Warriors 141	22 July 2022	3	5:00	London, England	
Win	3–0	Ryan Morgan	KO (punches)	Cage Warriors 134	18 March 2022	3	1:13	London, England	
Win	2–0	Danny Missin	Submission (guillotine choke)	FightStar Championship 19	14 December 2019	1	0:56	London, England	
Win	1–0	Glody Matusiwa	TKO (punches)	Rise of Champions 7	2 March 2019	1	N/A	Brentwood, England	Flyweight debut.

== See also ==
- List of current UFC fighters
- List of Dana White's Contender Series alumni
- List of male mixed martial artists
