= UFC on ESPN: Moreno vs. Erceg =

2025 mixed martial arts event in Mexico City

- The poster for UFC on ESPN: Moreno vs. Erceg
- Promotion: Ultimate Fighting Championship
- Date: March 29, 2025
- Venue: Arena CDMX
- City: Mexico City, Mexico
- Attendance: 19,731
- Total gate: $2,530,474

Event chronology
UFC Fight Night: Edwards vs. Brady	UFC on ESPN: Moreno vs. Erceg	UFC on ESPN: Emmett vs. Murphy

UFC on ESPN: Moreno vs. Erceg (also known as UFC on ESPN 64) was a mixed martial arts event produced by the Ultimate Fighting Championship that took place on March 29, 2025, at Arena CDMX in Mexico City, Mexico.

== Background ==
The event marked the promotion's seventh visit to Mexico City and first since UFC Fight Night: Moreno vs. Royval 2 in February 2024.

A flyweight bout between former two-time UFC Flyweight Champion Brandon Moreno and former title challenger Steve Erceg headlined the event.

A featherweight bout between former interim UFC Featherweight Champion Yair Rodríguez and Diego Lopes was rumored to be the headliner of the event, but Lopes later denied the fight ever happened.

A women's flyweight bout between Yazmin Jauregui and Dione Barbosa was scheduled for this event. However, due to Jauregui not wanting to face Barbosa, Barbosa replaced by former LFA Women's Strawweight Champion Julia Polastri in a strawweight bout. In turn, Jauregui withdrew from the bout due to an injury and was replaced by another former LFA strawweight champion in Loopy Godínez.

A lightweight bout between Joaquim Silva and Rafa García was scheduled for this event. However, Silva withdrew from the fight for undisclosed reasons and was replaced by Vinc Pichel.

A lightweight bout between Daniel Zellhuber and Elves Brener was scheduled for this event. However, Brener withdrew from the fight and was replaced by former LFA Lightweight Champion Austin Hubbard. In turn, Zellhuber was pulled from the card due to injury and was replaced by MarQuel Mederos.

A middleweight bout between former interim UFC Middleweight Championship challenger (also The Ultimate Fighter: Team Jones vs. Team Sonnen middleweight winner) Kelvin Gastelum and Joe Pyfer was scheduled for this event. Despite both men weighing in for the match, the fight was cancelled the day of the event due to Pyfer's illness.

At the weigh-ins, Ronaldo Rodríguez weighed in at 127 pounds, one pound over the flyweight non-title fight limit. The bout proceeded at catchweight and Rodríguez was fined 20 percent of his purse which went to his opponent Kevin Borjas.

== Results ==
Main card (ESPN2 / ESPN+)
Weight class				Method	Round	Time	Notes
Flyweight	Brandon Moreno	def.	Steve Erceg	Decision (unanimous) (49–46, 49–46, 49–46)	5	5:00
Lightweight	Manuel Torres	def.	Drew Dober	TKO (punches)	1	1:45
Flyweight	Édgar Cháirez	def.	C.J. Vergara	Submission (face crank)	1	2:30
Bantamweight	Raul Rosas Jr.	def.	Vince Morales	Decision (unanimous) (29–28, 29–28, 29–28)	3	5:00
Bantamweight	David Martínez	def.	Saimon Oliveira	TKO (knee and punches)	1	4:38
Catchweight (127 lb)	Kevin Borjas	def.	Ronaldo Rodríguez	Decision (unanimous) (30–27, 30–27, 29–28)	3	5:00
Preliminary card (ESPN2 / ESPN+)
Middleweight	Ateba Gautier	def.	José Medina	KO (punches and knee)	1	3:32
Featherweight	Melquizael Costa	def.	Christian Rodriguez	Decision (unanimous) (29–28, 29–28, 29–28)	3	5:00
Women's Strawweight	Loopy Godínez	def.	Julia Polastri	Decision (unanimous) (29–28, 29–28, 29–28)	3	5:00
Lightweight	Rafa García	def.	Vinc Pichel	Decision (unanimous) (30–27, 30–27, 29–28)	3	5:00
Featherweight	Jamall Emmers	def.	Gabriel Miranda	TKO (knee to the body and punches)	1	4:06
Lightweight	MarQuel Mederos	def.	Austin Hubbard	Decision (split) (28–29, 29–28, 29–28)	3	5:00

== Bonus awards ==
The following fighters received $50,000 bonuses.

- Fight of the Night: No bonus awarded.
- Performance of the Night: Manuel Torres, Édgar Cháirez, David Martínez, and Ateba Gautier

== See also ==
- 2025 in UFC
- List of current UFC fighters
- List of UFC events
