= Farman Hasanov =

Azerbaijani mixed martial artist (born 1995)

- Born: August 1, 1995 (age 31); Baku, Azerbaijan
- Other names: The Lion
- Height: 5 ft 11 in (180 cm)
- Weight: 170 lb (77 kg; 12 st 2 lb)
- Division: Welterweight
- Reach: 74 in (188 cm)
- Style: Freestyle wrestling
- Stance: Orthodox
- Fighting out of: Baku, Azerbaijan
- Team: American Top Team
- Rank: Master of Sport in Freestyle Wrestling
- Years active: 2022–present

Mixed martial arts record
- Total: 6
- Wins: 5
- By knockout: 3
- By decision: 2
- Losses: 1
- By knockout: 1

Other information
- Mixed martial arts record from Sherdog

Farman Hasanov (born August 1, 1995) is an Azerbaijani professional mixed martial artist currently competing in the Welterweight division of the Ultimate Fighting Championship (UFC). A former competitive freestyle wrestler, Hasanov previously competed for Legacy Fighting Alliance (LFA) before signing with the UFC.

== Background ==
Hasanov was born and raised in Baku, Azerbaijan. Prior to transitioning to mixed martial arts, he was a high-level wrestler, achieving the title of Master of Sport in Freestyle Wrestling. He began training in MMA in 2021. In 2022, Hasanov represented Azerbaijan as an amateur and earned a silver medal at the European MMA Championships.

In 2023, Hasanov moved to the United States to further his MMA career, initially training at Stout PGH in Pittsburgh, Pennsylvania, before relocating to Florida to join American Top Team in Coconut Creek.

== Mixed martial arts career ==
=== Early career ===
Hasanov made his professional MMA debut on July 3, 2022, at Ased Fighting Championship in Baku, defeating Emil Salimov via first-round technical knockout in 47 seconds. Later that month, on July 30, 2022, he stopped Ibragim Sariev via second-round TKO under the Iron Fist promotion.

=== Legacy Fighting Alliance ===
Following his initial pro fights, Hasanov signed with Legacy Fighting Alliance (LFA). He made his promotional debut at LFA 177 on February 23, 2024, defeating Luke Roberts via unanimous decision.

After a hiatus, Hasanov returned to action at LFA 211 on June 20, 2025, where he defeated Marc-Ari Lewis via technical knockout in the second round. On November 20, 2025, at LFA 223, Hasanov secured a first-round TKO victory over Abdurakhmon Fazilov via doctor stoppage near the end of the opening round.

=== Ultimate Fighting Championship ===
Compiling an undefeated 5–0 record with four finishes, Hasanov was signed by the Ultimate Fighting Championship in 2026.

Hasanov made his UFC debut on June 27, 2026, at UFC Fight Night 280 in Baku against Eric Nolan. Utilizing his wrestling control, Hasanov secured 17 takedowns and won the fight by unanimous decision.

Hasanov faced Jean-Paul Lebosnoyani on October 31, 2026, at UFC Fight Night 292. He lost the fight by technical knockout via doctor stoppage due to a cut in the third round.

== Championships and accomplishments ==
=== Mixed martial arts ===
- International Mixed Martial Arts Federation (IMMAF)
  - 2022 European MMA Championships Silver Medalist (Amateur)
- Ultimate Fighting Championship
  - Most takedowns landed in a UFC welterweight round (9) (R1 vs. Eric Nolan)
  - Most takedowns attempted in a UFC welterweight round (12) (R1 vs. Eric Nolan)
  - Second most takedowns landed in a UFC welterweight bout (17) (vs. Eric Nolan)
  - Fourth most takedowns landed in a UFC bout (17) (vs. Eric Nolan)

=== Freestyle wrestling ===
- Master of Sport in Freestyle Wrestling

== Mixed martial arts record ==
Professional record breakdown
6 matches	5 wins	1 loss
By knockout	3	1
By decision	2	0

Res.	Record	Opponent	Method	Event	Date	Round	Time	Location	Notes
Loss	5–1	Jean-Paul Lebosnoyani	TKO (doctor stoppage)	UFC Fight Night: Moicano vs. Nolan	October 31, 2026	3	2:11	Las Vegas, Nevada, United States	
Win	5–0	Eric Nolan	Decision (unanimous)	UFC Fight Night: Fiziev vs. Torres	June 27, 2026	3	5:00	Baku, Azerbaijan	
Win	4–0	Abdurakhmon Fazilov	TKO (doctor stoppage)	LFA 223	November 20, 2025	1	4:58	Niagara Falls, New York, United States	
Win	3–0	Marc-Ari Lewis	TKO (punches)	LFA 211	June 20, 2025	2	2:14	Shawnee, Oklahoma, United States	
Win	2–0	Luke Roberts	Decision (unanimous)	LFA 177	February 23, 2024	3	5:00	Prior Lake, Minnesota, United States	
Win	1–0	Emil Salimov	TKO (punches)	Ased FC: Selection 2	July 3, 2022	1	0:47	Baku, Azerbaijan	Welterweight debut.

== See also ==
- List of current UFC fighters
- List of male mixed martial artists
