= List of current UFC fighters =

American MMA promotion company fighters

This list of current UFC fighters records current Ultimate Fighting Championship (UFC) fighters' information, country origins, recent fighter signings and departures, fight schedules and results and the champion of each division. As of 31 October 2026, the UFC roster consisted of fighters from 76 countries.

== Notes/key ==
1. This list provides an up-to-date roster of all fighters currently competing under the UFC promotional banner. The list excludes fighters who have not fought for more than two years and are not subjected to suspension. (Note: Unless otherwise cited, all fighters listed are retrieved from ufc.com.)
2. All names presented are in accordance with Sherdog website profiles and may include common nicknames or alternative spellings rather than birth names. (Note: All names presented are in accordance with profiles and may include common nicknames or alternative spellings rather than birth names.)
3. Fighters are organized by weight class and within their weight class by the date of their debut in Endeavor (WEC, Strikeforce or UFC – whichever was the earliest debut date). (Note: Unless otherwise cited, all records are retrieved from sherdog.com.)
4. TKO records below are based on the combination of total fights which fighters fought under Endeavor, UFC, Strikeforce and WEC. (Note: All asterisked fighters are listed by a combination of their UFC, Strikeforce and WEC records.)
5. MMA records below are retrieved from Sherdog's website. (Note: All fighters' MMA records listed are retrieved from Sherdog's website.)
6. All asterisked fighters listed include a combination of their UFC, Strikeforce and WEC records.
7. The flags listed in these tables are in accordance with the UFC's official telecasts and may not fully or accurately represent the full citizenship of the people listed. (Note: The flags listed in these tables are in accordance with the UFC's official telecasts and may not fully or accurately represent the full citizenship of the people listed.)
8. WC = Weight Class; G = Gender; SW = Strawweight; FYW = Flyweight; BW = Bantamweight; FW = Featherweight; LW = Lightweight; WW = Welterweight; MW = Middleweight; LHW = Light heavyweight; HW = Heavyweight; WSW = Women's strawweight; WFYW = Women's flyweight; WBW = Women's bantamweight; and WFW = Women's featherweight.
9. Fighters' age and height are based on information obtained from Sherdog's website. (Note: Fighters' age and height are based on information obtained from Sherdog's website.)
10. Each fight record has four categories: wins, losses, draws and no-contests (NC). (Note: All fight records in this article are displayed in that order, with fights resulting in a no-contest listed in parentheses.)
11. Number of fighters in each division is counted as per the date indicated and the number could change week by week. (Note: Number of fighters in each division is counted as per the date indicated and the number could change week by week.)
12. Rankings are based on information obtained from the UFC's website and updated when information has been obtained from the UFC's website (▲ / ▼ = movement in rankings, (C) = Champion, (IC) = Interim Champion, and ^{(NR)} = not previously ranked). (Note: Ranking is based on information obtained from the UFC's website. Note: ▲ / ▼ = movement in rankings, (IC) = Interim Champion, ^{(NR)} = not previously ranked.)
13. The tables are sortable and the calculation for Endeavor and MMA records are formulated as follows: (Note: Fight records calculation: (1) Plus one point of the total wins for fighters who have not lost a fight; (2) Negative points of total loses for fighters who have not won a fight; (3) Add number of wins to the winning percentage; (4) A draw counts as 0.5 (5) No contest does not factor in as one of the variables of the calculation.)
  - Plus one point of the total wins for fighters having not lost a fight: 5–0–0 = 6
  - Negative points of total losses for fighters having not won a fight: 0–3–0 = −3
  - Add number of wins to the winning percentage: 10–1–0 = 10.90 | 10 + (10/11)
  - A draw counts as 0.5: 8–4–1 = 8.65 | 8 + (8.5/13)
  - No contest does not factor in as one of the variables of the calculation: 8–2–0 (1 NC) = 8.80 | 8 + (8/10)

== Recent releases and retirements ==
These fighters have either announced their retirement or have been released from their UFC contracts over the course of the last month. If their release has not been announced, then they have been listed here based upon their removal from the UFC's roster.

Date	ISO	Name	Nickname	Reason	Division	Ref	Endeavor record	MMA record
Oct 31, 2026	(United States)	Julian Erosa	Juicy J	Retired	Featherweight		10–9	32–13
Nov 10, 2026	(Brazil)	Norma Dumont	The Immortal	Released	Women's Bantamweight		9–4	13–4
Nov 14, 2026	(United States)	Stephen Thompson	Wonderboy	Retired	Welterweight		13–9–1	18–9–1
Nov 18, 2026	(Brazil)	Virna Jandiroba	Carcará	Released	Women's Strawweight		9–5	23–5
Nov 18, 2026	(United States)	Ryan Hall	The Wizard	Released	Featherweight		5–1	9–2
Nov 18, 2026	(Brazil)	Wellington Turman	The Prodigy	Released	Middleweight		3–7	18–9
Nov 20, 2026	(South Korea)	Lee Jeong-yeong	The Korean Tiger	Retired	Featherweight		2–3	11–3
Nov 20, 2026	(Brazil)	Douglas Silva de Andrade	D'Silva	Released	Featherweight		7–7	29–7 (1 NC)
Nov 20, 2026	(Georgia (country))	Giga Chikadze	Ninja	Released	Featherweight		8–5	15–7
Nov 20, 2026	(France)	William Gomis	The Jaguar	Released	Featherweight		5–2	15–4
Nov 21, 2026	(United States)	Brian Ortega	T-City	Retired	Lightweight		8–6 (1 NC)	16–6 (1 NC)

== Recent signings ==
The fighters in this section have either signed with the UFC and yet to be debuted, have recently returned from an announced retirement, or have yet to make their UFC return.

Date	ISO	Name	Nickname	Division	Status / next fight / Info	Ref	MMA record
December 13, 2024	(England)	Kennedy Freeman	The Machine 2.0	Women's Flyweight			6–0
August 19, 2025	(Mexico)	Ramiro Jimenez	El Cachanilla	Featherweight	(September 4, 2026) – Vera's visa issues – Bout cancelled – UFC Fight Night 288 (Glendale) – Rodrigo Vera		11–0
August 19, 2025	(England)	Louis Lee Scott	Lightning	Bantamweight	UFC 336 (Toronto) – Serhiy Sidey		9–0
October 1, 2025	(United States)	Christopher Alvidrez	The Newborn	Welterweight	(March 28, 2026) – Unknown reasons – No longer scheduled for UFC 327 (Miami) – Francisco Prado		7–1
May 25, 2026	(Russia)	Magomedrasul Gasanov		Middleweight	(June 21, 2026) – Unknown reasons – Pulled out of UFC Fight Night 282 (Abu Dhabi) – Abubakar Vagaev		23–2
August 11, 2026	(United States)	Tom Pagliarulo	The Phenom	Featherweight			11–2
August 18, 2026	(United States)	Roman Puga		Featherweight			6–1
August 18, 2026	(United States)	Taner Trembley	Killemquick	Featherweight			7–1
August 18, 2026	(United States)	Trent Miller	The Terminator	Middleweight			10–3
August 18, 2026	(Brazil)	Kaik Brito		Welterweight			20–6
August 25, 2026	(United States)	Ronald Humphrey		Welterweight	UFC 335 (Las Vegas) – Nikolay Veretennikov		5–0
August 25, 2026	(Scotland)	Sean Clancy Jr.	The One	Welterweight	UFC 336 (Toronto) – Cameron Nelson		9–0
August 25, 2026	(Brazil)	Guilherme Uriel	Urso	Heavyweight			8–2
August 25, 2026	(United States)	Alex Apodaca		Women's Bantamweight			4–1
September 1, 2026	(United States)	Adam Livingston	Bomb	Lightweight			8–1
September 1, 2026	(Mexico)	Silvestre Sanchez	Gorilla	Lightweight			10–1
September 1, 2026	(Brazil)	Modestino Rodrigues	The Slanderman	Middleweight	UFC Fight Night 295 (Riyadh) – Matthieu Letho Duclos		8–1
September 1, 2026	(Republic of Ireland)	Adam Darby	The Plank	Welterweight			8–1
September 8, 2026	(United States)	Christian Natividad	The Hawaiian Punch	Flyweight			10–0
September 8, 2026	(Slovakia)	Martin Kozák	CEO	Middleweight			7–0
September 8, 2026	(United States)	Isaac Moreno	Primetime	Welterweight			9–0
September 8, 2026	(United States)	Quentin Pasley		Light Heavyweight	UFC 335 (Las Vegas) – Junior Tafa		4–0
September 15, 2026	(Kyrgyzstan)	Akbar Abdullaev	Bakal	Lightweight	UFC Fight Night 295 (Riyadh) – Mairon Santos		14–0
September 15, 2026	(Brazil)	Igor Cavalcanti	Jacaré	Middleweight			14–2
September 15, 2026	(Ecuador)	Mayton Perea	The Lion	Welterweight			9–3
September 22, 2026	(Poland)	Damian Piwowarczyk	Damsyn	Light Heavyweight			12–4
September 22, 2026	(Peru)	Piero Guaylupo	El Lobo	Lightweight	UFC Fight Night 296 (Dallas) – Magomed Zaynukov		13–0
September 22, 2026	(England)	Callum Connor	007	Lightweight			8–1
September 22, 2026	(Belgium)	Alvi Dasuyev	Spartan	Welterweight			10–0
September 22, 2026	(United States)	Jaden Ortega		Welterweight			6–1
September 29, 2026	(Brazil)	Aieza Ramos Bertolso		Women's Strawweight			8–0
September 29, 2026	(Peru)	Ian Escuza	El Especimen	Featherweight			8–0
September 29, 2026	(Senegal)	Adama Diop	Blindé	Heavyweight			7–1
September 29, 2026	(England)	George Staines	Saint	Lightweight			9–0
October 6, 2026	(Brazil)	Mateus Soares	I'm Ready	Bantamweight			12–2
October 6, 2026	(Brazil)	Roque Conceição Moreira Jr.		Flyweight	UFC 335 (Las Vegas) – Nilson Rojas		12–3
October 6, 2026	(United States)	Salhahuddin Everett	Bundy	Welterweight			5–0
October 6, 2026	(United States)	Preston LaGrange	One Shot	Light Heavyweight			7–1
October 13, 2026	(United States)	Gregory Foster	Punch First	Lightweight			9–1
October 13, 2026	(Brazil)	Douglas da Lapa	Robozinho	Middleweight			7–0
October 13, 2026	(Brazil)	Luis Francischinelli		Welterweight			7–1
October 13, 2026	(Sweden)	Smilla Sundell	The Hurricane	Women's Bantamweight			3–0
October 15, 2026	(Russia)	Ivan Gnizditskiy	Samurai	Light Heavyweight	UFC Fight Night 295 (Riyadh) – Uran Satybaldiev		7–0
October 27, 2026	(Australia)	George Mangos		Featherweight	UFC Fight Night 298 (Sydney) – Dagiisuren Chagnaadorj		10–1
October 27, 2026	(Mongolia)	Dagiisuren Chagnaadorj		Featherweight	UFC Fight Night 298 (Sydney) – George Mangos		12–2
October 27, 2026	(Nepal)	Rabindra Dhant		Bantamweight	UFC Fight Night 298 (Sydney) – Ryo Tajima		11–1
October 27, 2026	(Japan)	Ryo Tajima		Bantamweight	UFC Fight Night 298 (Sydney) – Rabindra Dhant		12–3
October 27, 2026	(China)	Ji Niushiyue	Little King Kong	Flyweight	UFC Fight Night 298 (Sydney) – Takaya Suzuki		17–4
October 27, 2026	(Japan)	Takaya Suzuki		Flyweight	UFC Fight Night 298 (Sydney) – Ji Niushiyue		9–1
October 27, 2026	(South Korea)	Park Bo-hyun	The Rush	Women's Strawweight	UFC Fight Night 298 (Sydney) – Meng Bo		10–3
October 27, 2026	(China)	Meng Bo		Women's Strawweight	UFC Fight Night 298 (Sydney) – Park Bo-hyun		24–8
November 14, 2026	(United States)	Mike Perry	Platinum	Welterweight			15–9

== Suspended fighters ==
The list below is based on fighters suspended either by (1) United States Anti-Doping Agency (USADA), World Anti-Doping Agency (WADA) or Combat Sports Anti-Doping (CSAD) for violation of taking prohibited substances or non-analytical incidents, (2) by local commissions on misconduct during the fights or at event venues, or (3) by the UFC.

As of May 16, 2019, a total of 76 UFC fighters have been sanctioned by USADA since the UFC USADA testing program started.

Beginning in January 2024, the UFC announced a new partnership with Drug Free Sport International, a company that oversees the anti-doping programs of the NCAA, MLB, NFL, and NBA. The administration of the UFC Anti-Doping Program, including sanctioning decisions, will be handled exclusively and independently by Combat Sports Anti-Doping (CSAD), where the former FBI agent George Piro will serve as the independent administrator of the UFC's anti-doping program.

ISO	Name	Nickname	Division	From	Duration	Tested positive for / Info	By	Eligible to fight again	Ref.	Notes
(Kazakhstan)	Alibi Idiris		Flyweight	February 21, 2026	12 months	Hydrochlorothiazide	CSAD	February 21, 2027		Result vs. Ode Osbourne overturned separately by the Texas Department of Licensing and Regulation (TDLR).
(United States)	Bassil Hafez	The Habibi	Welterweight	March 20, 2026	12 months	Ipamorelin	CSAD	March 20, 2027		
(Switzerland)	Volkan Oezdemir	No Time	Light Heavyweight	February 16, 2026	16 months	EPO	CSAD	June 17, 2027		
(Brazil)	Jaqueline Amorim	Jacque	Women's Strawweight	August 17, 2026	6 months	Ostarine	CSAD	February 17, 2027		
(France)	Manon Fiorot	The Beast	Women's Flyweight	October 19, 2026	3 months	Ostarine	CSAD	January 19, 2027		

== Debuted fighters' countries of origin ==
The flagicon listed in these tables are in accordance with the UFC's official telecasts and may not fully or accurately represent the full citizenship of the peoples listed.

Updated as of November 21, 2026 after UFC Fight Night: Procházka vs. Stirling.

ISO	FLW	BW	FW	LW	WW	MW	LHW	HW	WSW	WFYW	WBW	Total
(Angola)	1											1
(Albania)		1										1
(Argentina)			1	2	1				1		1	6
(Armenia)			1	1								2
(Aruba)						1						1
(Australia)	1	2	5	3	3	3	3	2				22
(Austria)			1			1		1				3
(Azerbaijan)		1		3	2							6
(Bahrain)								1				1
(Belgium)			2									2
(Brazil)	7	7	12	13	7	9	8	11	19	9	7	108
(Canada)		7		4	2	2		1	1	2	1	20
(Chile)					2							2
(China)	1	3	1	2	2	2	2		3	2		18
(Cameroon)						1						1
(Colombia)			1									1
(Croatia)					1			1				2
(Cuba)			1					1				2
(Czech Republic)							1			1		2
(Denmark)				1	1							2
(Dominican Republic)								1				1
(Ecuador)		3			1							4
(England)	1	1	6	3	2	1		2	1		1	18
(Finland)		1										1
(France)	1		1	5		2	1	1	1	1	1	14
(Georgia (country))		3		1	1		1					6
(Germany)				1	1	1		1				4
(Democratic Republic of the Congo)		1										1
(Hungary)			1									1
(Iceland)					1							1
(India)				1					1			2
(Indonesia)	1											1
(Iran)								1				1
(Republic of Ireland)				1	2				1			4
(Iraq)	1											1
(Italy)		1	1			1						3
(Jamaica)	1				1							2
(Japan)	3	3	1						1			8
(Kazakhstan)	2				2		1					5
(Kyrgyzstan)		1	1		1		1			1		5
(Lithuania)						1	1			1		3
(Mexico)	4	4	6	4					3	2		23
(Moldova)			1				1	1				3
(Morocco)			2	1		1						4
(Myanmar)	1											1
(Mongolia)	2											2
(Montenegro)				1								1
(Netherlands)						1	1					2
(New Zealand)	1	1		1			2				1	6
(Nigeria)				1		2		1				4
(Norway)					1							1
(Palestine)				1								1
(Panama)											1	1
(Peru)	3	1	2	1								7
(Poland)		1	1	3		3	2	1	1		1	13
(Portugal)								1			1	2
(Romania)									1			1
(Russia)	1	5	1	1	2	7	4	3			2	26
(Scotland)				1				1		1		3
(Serbia)		1			1	2		1	1		1	7
(Slovakia)				1						1		2
(South Africa)		1				1						2
(South Korea)	2	2	2		1	2						9
(Spain)	1	1			1							3
(Sweden)					1							1
(Switzerland)						1	1					2
(Tajikistan)		1		1								2
(Thailand)									1			1
(Turkey)							2	1				3
(Uganda)			1									1
(Ukraine)				1	2		1					4
(United Arab Emirates)						1						1
(United States)	10	24	33	35	26	29	13	18	7	11	5	210
(Uzbekistan)	1					1	1					3
(Venezuela)			1						1	2		4
(Wales)				1	1							2
Total	46	77	86	96	70	73	47	51	45	33	24	648
WC	FLW	BW	FW	LW	WW	MW	LHW	HW	WSW	WFLW	WBW	

== Rankings ==
The UFC introduced official rankings in February 2013 using a weekly media voting panel. On June 20, 2026, the promotion began replacing that system with the Meta UFC Rankings, an Elo‑based mathematical model designed to prioritize objectivity through factors such as opponent quality, activity, and decay for long layoffs or outdated wins. The new framework removes pound‑for‑pound rankings and minimizes human involvement, with the media panel continuing only during a transition period.

== Current champions, weight classes and status ==
The UFC currently uses nine different weight classes. This list of champions is updated as of November 14, 2026, after UFC 334.

WC	Min	Upper limit	G	Champion	Flag	Date won	Ref	Days held	Defenses	Next Fight / Info	Ref
SW	SW	115 Ib; 52.2 kg	W	Mackenzie Dern	(Brazil)	October 25, 2025		393	1. def. Gillian Robertson at UFC 330 on Aug 15, 2026	TBD	
FLW	>115 Ib >52.2 kg	125 Ib; 56.7 kg	M	Joshua Van	(Myanmar)	December 6, 2025		351	1. def. Tatsuro Taira at UFC 328 on May 9, 2026; 2. def. Alexandre Pantoja at UFC 331 on Sep 19, 2026	UFC 336 - Manel Kape	
FLW	>115 Ib >52.2 kg	125 Ib; 56.7 kg	W	Natália Silva	(Brazil)	October 3, 2026		50		TBD	
BW	>125 Ib >56.7 kg	135 Ib; 61.2 kg	M	Petr Yan	(Russia)	December 6, 2025		351	1. def. Merab Dvalishvili at UFC 333 on Oct 24, 2026	TBD	
BW	>125 Ib >56.7 kg	135 Ib; 61.2 kg	W	Kayla Harrison	(United States)	June 7, 2025		533	1. def. Amanda Nunes at UFC 334 on Nov 14, 2026	TBD	
FTW	>135 Ib >61.2 kg	145 Ib; 65.8 kg	M	Alexander Volkanovski	(Australia)	April 12, 2025		589	1. def. Diego Lopes at UFC 325 on Feb 1, 2026; 2. def. Movsar Evloev at UFC 333 on Oct 24, 2026	TBD	
LW	>145 Ib >65.8 kg	155 Ib; 70.3 kg	M	Justin Gaethje	(United States)	June 14, 2026		161		TBD	
WW	>155 Ib >70.3 kg	170 Ib; 77.1 kg	M	Islam Makhachev	(Russia)	November 15, 2025		371	1. def. Ian Machado Garry at UFC 330 on Aug 15, 2026	TBD	
MW	>170 Ib >77.1 kg	185 Ib; 83.9 kg	M	Sean Strickland	(United States)	May 9, 2026		197		TBD	
LHW	>185 Ib >83.9 kg	205 Ib; 93 kg	M	Carlos Ulberg	(New Zealand)	April 11, 2026		225		TBD	
HW	>205 Ib >93 kg	265 Ib; 120.2 kg	M	Ciryl Gane	(France)	September 14, 2026		69	1. def. Josh Hokit at UFC 334 on Nov 14, 2026	TBD	

== Debuted fighters ==
=== Heavyweights (265lb, 120 kg) ===
ISO	Name	Age	Ht.	Nickname	Result / next fight / status	Ref	Endeavor record	MMA record
(United States)	Derrick Lewis	41	6 ft 3 in (1.91 m)	The Black Beast	Loss – UFC Freedom 250 (Washington) – Josh Hokit		20–12	28–14 (1 NC)
(United States)	Curtis Blaydes	35	6 ft 4 in (1.93 m)	Razor	Win – UFC Fight Night 288 (Glendale) – Waldo Cortes-Acosta		15–6 (1 NC)	20–6 (1 NC)
(Poland)	Marcin Tybura	41	6 ft 3 in (1.91 m)	Tybur	Loss – UFC Fight Night 283 (Belgrade) – Aleksandar Rakić		14–11	27–12
(Russia)	Alexander Volkov	38	6 ft 7 in (2.01 m)	Drago	Win – UFC 333 (Abu Dhabi) – Rizvan Kuniev		15–5	41–11
(Australia)	Tai Tuivasa	33	6 ft 2 in (1.88 m)	Bam Bam	Loss – UFC 331 (Los Angeles) – Robelis Despaigne		8–11	14–11
(Austria)	Aleksandar Rakić	34	6 ft 5 in (1.96 m)	Rocket	Win – UFC Fight Night 283 (Belgrade) – Marcin Tybura		7–5	15–6
(United States)	Ryan Spann	35	6 ft 5 in (1.96 m)	Superman	UFC Fight Night 296 (Dallas) – Louie Sutherland		10–7	24–12
(Brazil)	Johnny Walker	34	6 ft 5 in (1.96 m)		Win – UFC Fight Night 293 (Las Vegas) – Waldo Cortes-Acosta		10–7 (1 NC)	24–10 (1 NC)
(Russia)	Sergei Pavlovich	34	6 ft 3 in (1.91 m)		UFC 335 (Las Vegas) – Alex Pereira		9–3	21–3
(Nigeria)	Kennedy Nzechukwu	34	6 ft 5 in (1.96 m)	The African Savage	UFC Fight Night 296 (Dallas) – Elisha Ellison		8–7–1	14–7–1
(Moldova)	Serghei Spivac	31	6 ft 3 in (1.91 m)	The Polar Bear	UFC Fight Night 295 (Riyadh) – Mário Pinto		9–7	18–7
(France)	Ciryl Gane (c)	36	6 ft 5 in (1.96 m)	Bon Gamin	Win – UFC 334 (New York City) – Josh Hokit		11–2 (1 NC)	14–2 (1 NC)
(Canada)	Tanner Boser	35	6 ft 2 in (1.88 m)	The Bulldozer	Win – UFC Fight Night 291 (Edmonton) – Jhonata Diniz		6–6	23–11–1
(England)	Tom Aspinall	33	6 ft 5 in (1.96 m)				8–1 (1 NC)	15–3 (1 NC)
(Brazil)	Alex Pereira	39	6 ft 4 in (1.93 m)	Poatan	UFC 335 (Las Vegas) – Sergei Pavlovich		10–3	13–4
(Dominican Republic)	Waldo Cortes-Acosta	35	6 ft 4 in (1.93 m)	Salsa Boy	Loss – UFC Fight Night 293 (Las Vegas) – Johnny Walker		10–5	17–5
(Brazil)	Vitor Petrino	29	6 ft 2 in (1.88 m)	Icão	Win – UFC Fight Night 285 (Sacramento) – Serghei Spivac		8–2	15–2
(England)	Mick Parkin	31	6 ft 4 in (1.93 m)		Loss – UFC 332 (Salt Lake City) – Johnny Walker		4–2	10–2
(Bahrain)	Shamil Gaziev	36	6 ft 4 in (1.93 m)		Loss – UFC Fight Night 294 (Al Rayyan) – Tallison Teixeira		4–4	15–4
(United States)	Thomas Petersen	31	6 ft 1 in (1.85 m)	The Train	Win – UFC Fight Night 293 (Las Vegas) – Gabriel Lorenço		4–4	12–5
(Cuba)	Robelis Despaigne	38	6 ft 7 in (2.01 m)	The Bad Boy	Win – UFC 331 (Los Angeles) – Tai Tuivasa		2–2	7–2
(Brazil)	Valter Walker	28	6 ft 6 in (1.98 m)	The Foot Hunter	Win – UFC Fight Night 282 (Abu Dhabi) – Thomas Petersen		5–1	16–1
(Brazil)	Jhonata Diniz	35	6 ft 4 in (1.93 m)		Loss – UFC Fight Night 291 (Edmonton) – Tanner Boser		3–3	9–3
(United States)	Sean Sharaf	33	6 ft 2 in (1.88 m)	The Smoke	Win – UFC 331 (Los Angeles) – Gable Steveson		1–2	5–2
(Brazil)	Tallison Teixeira	26	6 ft 7 in (2.01 m)	Xicao	Win – UFC Fight Night 294 (Al Rayyan) – Shamil Gaziev		3–2	10–2
(Portugal)	Mário Pinto	28	6 ft 5 in (1.96 m)		UFC Fight Night 295 (Riyadh) – Serghei Spivac		4–0	13–0
(Russia)	Rizvan Kuniev	34	6 ft 4 in (1.93 m)		Loss – UFC 333 (Abu Dhabi) – Alexander Volkov		2–2	14–4–1 (1 NC)
(United States)	Alvin Hines	35	6 ft 2 in (1.88 m)	Goozie	(October 8, 2026) – Vertigo – Forced to pull out from UFC Fight Night 293 (Las Vegas) – Gabriel Lorenço		0–2	7–2
(Brazil)	Marcus Buchecha	36	6 ft 3 in (1.91 m)		Loss – UFC Fight Night 274 (Las Vegas) – Ryan Spann		0–2–1	5–3–1
(Croatia)	Ante Delija	36	6 ft 5 in (1.96 m)	Walking Trouble	(June 21, 2026) – Injury – Out of UFC Fight Night 283 (Belgrade) – Johnny Walker		1–2	26–8
(Australia)	Brando Peričić	32	6 ft 5 in (1.96 m)	The Balkan Bear	Win – UFC Fight Night 275 (Perth) – Shamil Gaziev		3–0	7–1
(United States)	Elisha Ellison	29	5 ft 11 in (1.80 m)	Snack Panther	UFC Fight Night 296 (Dallas) – Kennedy Nzechukwu		0–2	5–3
(Scotland)	Louie Sutherland	32	6 ft 3 in (1.91 m)	The Vanilla Gorilla	UFC Fight Night 296 (Dallas) – Ryan Spann		1–3	11–6
(United States)	Josh Hokit	29	6 ft 1 in (1.85 m)	The Incredible Hok	Loss – UFC 334 (New York City) – Ciryl Gane		4–1	10–1
(Brazil)	Max Gimenis	33	6 ft 0 in (1.83 m)		(July 23, 2026) – Undisclosed injury – Out of UFC Fight Night 283 (Belgrade) – Jovan Leka		0–1	6–2
(United States)	Denzel Freeman	35	6 ft 1 in (1.85 m)	Luke Fox	Loss – UFC 324 (Las Vegas) – Josh Hokit		1–1	7–2
(Brazil)	Guilherme Pat	32	6 ft 5 in (1.96 m)	Kong	Loss – UFC Fight Night 284 (Las Vegas) – Steven Asplund		1–2	6–2
(United States)	Allen Frye Jr.	31	6 ft 4 in (1.93 m)	AJ	Win – UFC Fight Night 290 (Las Vegas) – RJ Harris		1–1	7–1
(United States)	Steven Asplund	28	6 ft 5 in (1.96 m)	Concrete	UFC Fight Night 296 (Dallas) – Gökhan Saricam		2–1	7–2
(United States)	Tyrell Fortune	36	6 ft 2 in (1.88 m)		Loss – UFC Fight Night 282 (Abu Dhabi) – Rizvan Kuniev		1–1	18–4 (2 NC)
(Turkey)	Gökhan Saricam	35	6 ft 3 in (1.91 m)		UFC Fight Night 296 (Dallas) – Steven Asplund		1–0	12–2
(United States)	Gable Steveson	26	6 ft 1 in (1.85 m)		UFC 336 (Toronto) – Terrance Chatman		1–1	4–1
(United States)	RJ Harris	28	6 ft 6 in (1.98 m)	The Hammer	Loss – UFC Fight Night 290 (Las Vegas) – Allen Frye Jr.		1–1	6–1
(Serbia)	Jovan Leka	24	6 ft 4 in (1.93 m)		Win – UFC Fight Night 283 (Belgrade) – Alexander Poppeck		1–0	14–2
(Germany)	Alexander Poppeck	34	6 ft 2 in (1.88 m)	Ironside	(September 29, 2026) – Unknown reasons – Pulled out of UFC Fight Night 290 (Las Vegas) – Felipe Franco / Moving to Light Heavyweight		0–1	21–6 (1 NC)
(Brazil)	José Luiz	30	6 ft 6 in (1.98 m)	Montanha	Win – UFC Fight Night 284 (Las Vegas) – Louie Sutherland		1–0	7–1
(United States)	Anthony Wint	31	5 ft 11 in (1.80 m)	Bow Down	Win – UFC 332 (Salt Lake City) – Lucas Armand		2–0	9–0
(United States)	Terrance Chatman	29	6 ft 0 in (1.83 m)	The Answer	UFC 336 (Toronto) – Gable Steveson		0–1	5–2
(United States)	Lucas Armand	31	6 ft 4 in (1.93 m)	Do or Die	Loss – UFC 332 (Salt Lake City) – Anthony Wint		0–1	6–1
(Iran)	Javad Mahjoub	35	6 ft 1 in (1.85 m)		Loss – UFC Fight Night 291 (Edmonton) – Joel Faglier		0–1	5–1
(United States)	Joel Faglier	25	6 ft 2 in (1.88 m)	The Sniper	Win – UFC Fight Night 291 (Edmonton) – Javad Mahjoub		1–0	7–0
(Brazil)	Gabriel Lorenço	27	6 ft 2 in (1.88 m)	Black Mamba	Loss – UFC Fight Night 293 (Las Vegas) – Thomas Petersen		0–1	8–2

=== Light heavyweights (205 lb, 93 kg) ===
ISO	Name	Age	Ht.	Nickname	Result / next fight / status	Ref	Endeavor record	MMA record
(United States)	Dustin Jacoby	38	6 ft 4 in (1.93 m)	The Hanyak	Loss – UFC Fight Night 282 (Abu Dhabi) – Muhammad Saidov		10–7–1	22–9–1
(Australia)	Robert Whittaker	35	6 ft 0 in (1.83 m)	The Reaper	UFC Fight Night 298 (Sydney) – Bogdan Guskov		18–7	27–9
(Russia)	Nikita Krylov	34	6 ft 2 in (1.88 m)	The Miner	Loss – UFC 333 (Abu Dhabi) – Abdul-Rakhman Yakhyaev		12–11	31–13
(Poland)	Jan Błachowicz	43	6 ft 2 in (1.88 m)		Loss – UFC Fight Night 283 (Belgrade) – Navajo Stirling		12–9–2	29–12–2
(Moldova)	Ion Cuțelaba	32	6 ft 1 in (1.85 m)	The Hulk	UFC Fight Night 295 (Riyadh) – Magomed Tuchalov		9–11–1	20–12–1 (1 NC)
(United States)	Khalil Rountree Jr.	36	6 ft 1 in (1.85 m)	The War Horse	(July 13, 2026) – Undisclosed injury – Out of UFC Fight Night 282 (Abu Dhabi) – Magomed Ankalaev		10–7 (1 NC)	14–7 (1 NC)
(Switzerland)	Volkan Oezdemir	37	6 ft 2 in (1.88 m)	No Time	(February 16, 2026) – Tested positive for EPO – Suspended for 16 months until June 17, 2027		9–7	21–8
(Brazil)	Paulo Costa	35	6 ft 0 in (1.83 m)	The Eraser	Win – UFC 327 (Miami) – Azamat Murzakanov		8–4	16–4
(United States)	Dominick Reyes	36	6 ft 4 in (1.93 m)	The Devastator	Win – UFC 333 (Abu Dhabi) – Azamat Murzakanov		11–5	17–5
(Russia)	Magomed Ankalaev	34	6 ft 2 in (1.88 m)		Win – UFC Fight Night 282 (Abu Dhabi) – Bogdan Guskov		13–2–1 (1 NC)	22–2–1 (1 NC)
(Australia)	Jimmy Crute	31	6 ft 2 in (1.88 m)	The Brute	(January 14, 2026) – Torn ACL – Out of UFC 325 (Sydney) – Dustin Jacoby		6–4–2	14–4–2
(United States)	Alonzo Menifield	39	6 ft 0 in (1.83 m)	Atomic	Win – UFC 331 (Los Angeles) – Iwo Baraniewski		12–6–1	19–6–1
(United States)	Jamahal Hill	35	6 ft 4 in (1.93 m)	Sweet Dreams			7–3 (1 NC)	13–3 (1 NC)
(Czech Republic)	Jiří Procházka	34	6 ft 4 in (1.93 m)	BJP	Loss – UFC Fight Night 294 (Al Rayyan) – Navajo Stirling		6–4	32–7–1
(Lithuania)	Modestas Bukauskas	32	6 ft 3 in (1.91 m)	The Baltic Gladiator	Win – UFC Fight Night 287 (Paris) – Oumar Sy		9–5	21–7
(Georgia (country))	Roman Dolidze	38	6 ft 3 in (1.91 m)	Bazooka	Loss – UFC Fight Night 285 (Sacramento) – Reinier de Ridder		9–5	15–6
(New Zealand)	Carlos Ulberg (c)	36	6 ft 4 in (1.93 m)	Black Jag	Win – UFC 327 (Miami) – Jiří Procházka (April 18, 2026) – Torn ACL injury		10–1	14–1
(Russia)	Azamat Murzakanov	37	5 ft 10 in (1.78 m)	The Professional	Loss – UFC 333 (Abu Dhabi) – Dominick Reyes		6–2	16–2
(United States)	Sedriques Dumas	31	6 ft 2 in (1.88 m)	The Reaper	Loss – UFC Fight Night 289 (Las Vegas) – Luis Hernandez		3–6 (1 NC)	10–6 (1 NC)
(Australia)	Junior Tafa	30	6 ft 3 in (1.91 m)	The Juggernaut	UFC 335 (Las Vegas) – Quentin Pasley		3–6	7–6
(Uzbekistan)	Bogdan Guskov	34	6 ft 3 in (1.91 m)	Czarevitch	UFC Fight Night 298 (Sydney) – Robert Whittaker		4–2–1	18–4–1
(Brazil)	Rodolfo Bellato	30	6 ft 3 in (1.91 m)	Trator	Loss – UFC Fight Night 289 (Las Vegas) – Christian Edwards		2–2–1 (1 NC)	13–4–1 (1 NC)
(China)	Zhang Mingyang	28	6 ft 2 in (1.88 m)	Mountain Tiger	Loss – UFC Fight Night 277 (Macau) – Alonzo Menifield		3–2	19–8
(Brazil)	Brendson Ribeiro	30	6 ft 3 in (1.91 m)	The Gorilla	Win – UFC Fight Night 290 (Las Vegas) – Felipe Franco		3–6	18–11 (1 NC)
(Turkey)	İbo Aslan	30	6 ft 3 in (1.91 m)	The Last Ottoman			2–3	14–4
(France)	Oumar Sy	31	6 ft 4 in (1.93 m)		Loss – UFC Fight Night 287 (Paris) – Modestas Bukauskas		3–3	12–3
(Netherlands)	Reinier de Ridder	36	6 ft 4 in (1.93 m)	The Dutch Knight	Win – UFC Fight Night 285 (Sacramento) – Roman Dolidze		5–2	22–4
(New Zealand)	Navajo Stirling	29	6 ft 4 in (1.93 m)		Win – UFC Fight Night 294 (Al Rayyan) – Jiří Procházka		7–0	12–0
(United States)	Billy Elekana	31	6 ft 3 in (1.91 m)		Loss – UFC Fight Night 293 (Las Vegas) – Lucas Fernando		3–2	10–3
(United States)	Julius Walker	27	6 ft 4 in (1.93 m)	Juice Box	Win – UFC Fight Night 290 (Las Vegas) – Gerald Meerschaert		2–3	8–3
(Kazakhstan)	Diyar Nurgozhay	29	6 ft 2 in (1.88 m)		Win – UFC Fight Night 294 (Al Rayyan) – Alik Lorenz		3–2	13–2
(Kyrgyzstan)	Uran Satybaldiev	32	6 ft 4 in (1.93 m)	Gorilla	UFC Fight Night 295 (Riyadh) – Ivan Gnizditskiy		1–1	10–1
(Brazil)	Kevin Christian	31	6 ft 7 in (2.01 m)		Loss – UFC Fight Night 275 (Perth) – Junior Tafa		0–2	9–4
(Turkey)	Abdul-Rakhman Yakhyaev	25	6 ft 2 in (1.88 m)	Hunter	Win – UFC 333 (Abu Dhabi) – Nikita Krylov		4–0	11–0
(Poland)	Iwo Baraniewski	28	6 ft 0 in (1.83 m)	Rudy	Loss – UFC 331 (Los Angeles) – Alonzo Menifield		3–1	9–1
(United States)	Luke Fernandez	31	6 ft 1 in (1.85 m)		Loss – UFC 326 (Las Vegas) – Rodolfo Bellato		0–1	6–1
(Brazil)	Rafael Tobias	26	6 ft 2 in (1.88 m)	Bipolar	Loss - UFC 330 (Philadelphia) – Lucas Fernando		0–2	14–3
(Brazil)	Felipe Franco	24	6 ft 1 in (1.85 m)	Negao	Loss – UFC Fight Night 290 (Las Vegas) – Brendson Ribeiro		1–2	11–3
(United States)	Christian Edwards	28	6 ft 5 in (1.96 m)	Pain	Win – UFC Fight Night 289 (Las Vegas) – Rodolfo Bellato		1–1	9–5
(Brazil)	Levi Rodrigues Jr.	31	6 ft 0 in (1.83 m)	Baby Monster	Loss – UFC Fight Night 286 (Shanghai) – Liu Ce		0–2	5–2 (1 NC)
(Russia)	Magomed Tuchalov	26	6 ft 3 in (1.91 m)		UFC Fight Night 295 (Riyadh) – Ion Cuțelaba		1–0	6–0
(Russia)	Muhammad Saidov	30	6 ft 2 in (1.88 m)	Kubik	Win – UFC Fight Night 282 (Abu Dhabi) – Dustin Jacoby		1–0	10–0
(Brazil)	Lucas Fernando	29	6 ft 3 in (1.91 m)		Win – UFC Fight Night 293 (Las Vegas) – Billy Elekana		2–0	15–3
(China)	Liu Ce	30	6 ft 3 in (1.91 m)	The Oriental Dragon	Win – UFC Fight Night 286 (Shanghai) – Levi Rodrigues Jr.		1–0	4–1
(United States)	Luis Hernandez	30	5 ft 9 in (1.75 m)	The Stache	Win – UFC Fight Night 289 (Las Vegas) – Sedriques Dumas		1–0	9–0
(United States)	Alik Lorenz	29	6 ft 2 in (1.88 m)		Loss – UFC Fight Night 294 (Al Rayyan) – Diyar Nurgozhay		0–1	8–3

=== Middleweights (185 lb, 84 kg) ===
ISO	Name	Age	Ht.	Nickname	Result / next fight / status	Ref	Endeavor record	MMA record
(United States)	Brad Tavares	38	6 ft 1 in (1.85 m)		(July 9, 2026) – Withdrew due to undisclosed reasons – Bout cancelled – UFC Fight Night 281 (Oklahoma City) – Marc-André Barriault		16–12	21–12
(United States)	Kelvin Gastelum	35	5 ft 9 in (1.75 m)		(August 3, 2026) – Undisclosed reasons – UFC Fight Night 288 (Glendale) – Yousri Belgaroui		14–11 (1 NC)	20–11 (1 NC)
(United States)	Sean Strickland (c)	35	6 ft 1 in (1.85 m)	Tarzan	(October 3, 2026) – Strickland pay dispute – Bout not taking place – UFC 335 (Las Vegas) – Nassourdine Imavov		18–7	31–7
(United States)	Jared Cannonier	42	5 ft 11 in (1.80 m)	Tha Killa Gorilla	Loss – UFC Fight Night 294 (Al Rayyan) – Ikram Aliskerov		11–11	18–11
(Brazil)	Vicente Luque	34	5 ft 11 in (1.80 m)	The Silent Assassin	Win - UFC 330 (Philadelphia) – Tresean Gore		17–9	24–13–1
(Nigeria)	Kamaru Usman	39	6 ft 0 in (1.83 m)	The Nigerian Nightmare	Loss – UFC Fight Night 281 (Oklahoma City) – Dricus du Plessis		16–4	21–5
(United States)	Mickey Gall	34	6 ft 2 in (1.88 m)		Loss – UFC Fight Night 292 (Las Vegas) – Zachary Reese		6–8	7–8
(Italy)	Marvin Vettori	33	6 ft 0 in (1.83 m)	The Italian Dream	Loss – UFC 332 (Salt Lake City) – Ismail Naurdiev		9–10–1	19–11–1
(Poland)	Michał Oleksiejczuk	31	6 ft 0 in (1.83 m)	Hussar	Loss – UFC Fight Night 280 (Baku) – Abusupiyan Magomedov		10–8 (1 NC)	22–10 (1 NC)
(Nigeria)	Israel Adesanya	37	6 ft 4 in (1.93 m)	The Last Stylebender	UFC Fight Night 295 (Riyadh) – Sharabutdin Magomedov		13–6	24–6
(United States)	Edmen Shahbazyan	29	6 ft 2 in (1.88 m)	The Golden Boy	Win – UFC 331 (Los Angeles) – Brunno Ferreira		10–6	17–6
(United States)	Anthony Hernandez	33	6 ft 0 in (1.83 m)	Fluffy	Loss – UFC Fight Night 285 (Sacramento) – Gregory Rodrigues		9–4	15–4 (1 NC)
(Austria)	Ismail Naurdiev	30	6 ft 0 in (1.83 m)	The Austrian Wonderboy	Win – UFC 332 (Salt Lake City) – Marvin Vettori		5–3	26–8
(Canada)	Marc-André Barriault	36	6 ft 1 in (1.85 m)	Power Bar	Win – UFC Fight Night 291 (Edmonton) – Kyle Daukaus		7–10 (1 NC)	18–10 (1 NC)
(Brazil)	Rodolfo Vieira	37	5 ft 11 in (1.80 m)	Tha Black Belt Hunter	Win – UFC Fight Night 289 (Las Vegas) – Robert Bryczek		7–5	12–5
(South Korea)	Park Jun-yong	35	6 ft 0 in (1.83 m)	The Iron Turtle	UFC Fight Night 295 (Riyadh) – Marco Tulio		8–5	18–8
(United States)	Brendan Allen	30	6 ft 2 in (1.88 m)	All In	Win – UFC Fight Night 290 (Las Vegas) – Christian Leroy Duncan		16–4	28–7
(Russia)	Roman Kopylov	35	6 ft 0 in (1.83 m)		Win – UFC 332 (Salt Lake City) – Ateba Gautier		8–5	16–5
(United States)	Kyle Daukaus	33	6 ft 3 in (1.91 m)	The D'Arce Knight	Loss – UFC Fight Night 291 (Edmonton) – Marc-André Barriault		4–6 (1 NC)	17–6 (1 NC)
(United Arab Emirates)	Khamzat Chimaev	32	6 ft 2 in (1.88 m)	Borz	Loss – UFC 328 (Newark) – Sean Strickland		9–1	15–1
(France)	Nassourdine Imavov	31	6 ft 3 in (1.91 m)		(October 3, 2026) – Strickland pay dispute – Bout not taking place – UFC 335 (Las Vegas) – Sean Strickland		9–2 (1 NC)	17–4 (1 NC)
(Serbia)	Duško Todorović	32	6 ft 1 in (1.85 m)	Thunder	Loss – UFC Fight Night 283 (Belgrade) – Robert Valentin		4–7	13–7
(South Africa)	Dricus du Plessis	32	6 ft 0 in (1.83 m)	Stillknocks	Win – UFC Fight Night 281 (Oklahoma City) – Kamaru Usman		10–1	24–3
(United States)	Gilbert Urbina	30	6 ft 3 in (1.91 m)		UFC Fight Night 296 (Dallas) – Robert Valentin		2–3	8–4
(United States)	Cody Brundage	32	6 ft 0 in (1.83 m)		Win – UFC Fight Night 276 (Las Vegas) – Andre Petroski		6–8–1 (1 NC)	12–9–1 (1 NC)
(Australia)	Jacob Malkoun	31	6 ft 1 in (1.85 m)	Mamba	Loss – UFC 333 (Abu Dhabi) – Abubakar Vagaev		6–4	10–4
(United States)	Dustin Stoltzfus	35	5 ft 11 in (1.80 m)		Win - UFC 330 (Philadelphia) – Mansur Abdul-Malik		4–7	17–8
(Brazil)	Gregory Rodrigues	34	6 ft 3 in (1.91 m)	Robocop	Win – UFC Fight Night 285 (Sacramento) – Anthony Hernandez		11–3	20–6
(United States)	Andre Petroski	35	6 ft 0 in (1.83 m)		Win – UFC Fight Night 293 (Las Vegas) – Mantas Kondratavičius		9–5	14–6
(United States)	Tresean Gore	32	6 ft 0 in (1.83 m)	Mr. Vicious	Win - UFC 330 (Philadelphia) – Vicente Luque		4–4	7–4
(Brazil)	Caio Borralho	33	6 ft 2 in (1.88 m)	The Natural	Win – UFC 334 (New York City) – Yousri Belgaroui		9–1	19–2 (1 NC)
(Germany)	Abusupiyan Magomedov	36	6 ft 2 in (1.88 m)	Abus	Win – UFC 333 (Abu Dhabi) – Cameron Rowston		6–3	30–7–1
(United States)	Joe Pyfer	30	6 ft 2 in (1.88 m)	Bodybagz	UFC Fight Night 299 (Cleveland) – Bo Nickal		7–1	16–3
(Brazil)	Brunno Ferreira	34	5 ft 10 in (1.78 m)	The Hulk	Loss – UFC 331 (Los Angeles) – Edmen Shahbazyan		6–5	15–5
(United States)	Bo Nickal	30	6 ft 1 in (1.85 m)		UFC Fight Night 299 (Cleveland) – Joe Pyfer		6–1	9–1
(England)	Christian Leroy Duncan	31	6 ft 2 in (1.88 m)		Loss – UFC Fight Night 290 (Las Vegas) – Brendan Allen		8–3	15–3
(Russia)	Ikram Aliskerov	33	6 ft 0 in (1.83 m)		Win – UFC Fight Night 294 (Al Rayyan) – Jared Cannonier		6–1	19–2
(Uzbekistan)	Nursulton Ruziboev	33	6 ft 5 in (1.96 m)	Black	Loss – UFC Fight Night 287 (Paris) – Michael Page		5–2	37–10–2 (2 NC)
(Russia)	Sharabutdin Magomedov	32	6 ft 2 in (1.88 m)	Bullet	UFC Fight Night 295 (Riyadh) – Israel Adesanya		6–1	17–1
(United States)	Zachary Reese	32	6 ft 4 in (1.93 m)	Savage	Win – UFC Fight Night 292 (Las Vegas) – Mickey Gall		5–4 (1 NC)	11–4 (1 NC)
(Poland)	Robert Bryczek	36	6 ft 0 in (1.83 m)		UFC Fight Night 289 (Las Vegas) – Rodolfo Vieira		1–2	18–7
(Brazil)	César Almeida	38	6 ft 1 in (1.85 m)	Cesinha	Win – UFC 334 (New York City) – Donte Johnson		4–3	8–3
(Switzerland)	Robert Valentin	31	6 ft 2 in (1.88 m)	Robzilla	UFC Fight Night 296 (Dallas) – Gilbert Urbina		2–3	12–6
(United States)	Ryan Loder	35	6 ft 2 in (1.88 m)	Man of Steel			1–2	7–3
(United States)	Mansur Abdul-Malik	29	6 ft 2 in (1.88 m)		Loss - UFC 330 (Philadelphia) – Dustin Stoltzfus		4–2–1	10–2–1
(United States)	Osman Diaz	36	6 ft 4 in (1.93 m)	Ozzy	Loss – UFC 331 (Los Angeles) – Ryan Gandra		1–3	10–5
(Brazil)	Marco Tulio	32	6 ft 0 in (1.83 m)	Matuto	UFC Fight Night 295 (Riyadh) – Park Jun-yong		2–2	14–3
(Russia)	Azamat Bekoev	30	6 ft 0 in (1.83 m)	Iron	(October 25, 2026) – Medical emergency – Out of UFC Fight Night 292 (Las Vegas) – Andre Petroski		2–2	20–5
(United States)	Eric McConico	36	6 ft 0 in (1.83 m)		Loss - UFC Fight Night 284 (Las Vegas) – Donte Johnson		2–3	11–5–1
(United States)	Nick Klein	31	6 ft 1 in (1.85 m)	Blue Collar	Loss – UFC Fight Night 292 (Las Vegas) – Joseph Kropschot		0–3	6–4
(Brazil)	Djorden Santos	29	6 ft 2 in (1.88 m)	Shakur	Loss – UFC Fight Night 288 (Glendale) – Yousri Belgaroui		1–3	11–4
(Russia)	Andrey Pulyaev	29	6 ft 4 in (1.93 m)		Loss – UFC 332 (Salt Lake City) – Damian Pinas		1–4	10–6
(Cameroon)	Ateba Gautier	24	6 ft 4 in (1.93 m)	The Silent Assassin	Loss – UFC 332 (Salt Lake City) – Roman Kopylov		5–1	11–2
(United States)	Torrez Finney	28	5 ft 7 in (1.70 m)	The Punisher	Loss – UFC 325 (Sydney) – Jacob Malkoun		1–1	11–1
(United States)	Jackson McVey	27	6 ft 4 in (1.93 m)	The Moose	Win – UFC Fight Night 285 (Sacramento) – Wesley Schultz		2–2	8–2
(Russia)	Baisangur Susurkaev	25	6 ft 2 in (1.88 m)	Hunter	UFC 335 (Las Vegas) – Damian Pinas		3–0	12–0
(Australia)	Cameron Rowston	31	6 ft 3 in (1.91 m)	Battle Giraffe	Loss – UFC 333 (Abu Dhabi) – Abusupiyan Magomedov		3–1	15–4
(United States)	Tre'ston Vines	30	6 ft 0 in (1.83 m)	The Black Mamba	Draw – Road to UFC Season 5: Semifinals (Shanghai) – Yilizhati Maimaitijiang		0–1–1	10–4–1
(Netherlands)	Yousri Belgaroui	34	6 ft 5 in (1.96 m)	Baby Face Assassin	Loss – UFC 334 (New York City) – Caio Borralho		3–1	11–4
(United States)	Donte Johnson	27	5 ft 8 in (1.73 m)	Lockjaw	Loss – UFC 334 (New York City) – César Almeida		3–1	9–1
(Poland)	Cezary Oleksiejczuk	26	6 ft 3 in (1.91 m)				1–0	17–3
(Aruba)	Damian Pinas	24	6 ft 1 in (1.85 m)	The Baba Yaga	UFC 335 (Las Vegas) – Baisangur Susurkaev		3–0	11–1
(United States)	Wesley Schultz	30	6 ft 1 in (1.85 m)	Party Time	(October 25, 2026) – Unknown reasons – Pulled out of UFC Fight Night 293 (Las Vegas) – Mantas Kondratavičius		1–2	9–4
(Brazil)	Ryan Gandra	31	6 ft 1 in (1.85 m)	Problema	(October 26, 2026) – Undisclosed reasons – Out of UFC 335 (Las Vegas) – Baisangur Susurkaev		3–0	11–1
(Lithuania)	Mantas Kondratavičius	27	6 ft 2 in (1.88 m)		Loss – UFC Fight Night 293 (Las Vegas) – Andre Petroski		1–1	9–2
(Canada)	Julien Leblanc	34	6 ft 2 in (1.88 m)		Loss – UFC Fight Night 291 (Edmonton) – Nick Galanti		0–2	10–4
(Australia)	Ben Johnston	36	6 ft 4 in (1.93 m)		Loss – UFC Fight Night 275 (Perth) – Wesley Schultz		0–1	5–2
(South Korea)	Lee Yi-sak	26	6 ft 0 in (1.83 m)		Loss – UFC Fight Night 277 (Macau) – Luis Felipe Dias		0–1	8–2
(Brazil)	Luis Felipe Dias	31	5 ft 10 in (1.78 m)		Loss – UFC Fight Night 287 (Paris) – Matthieu Letho Duclos		1–1	18–6
(Russia)	Abubakar Vagaev	33	5 ft 11 in (1.80 m)		Win – UFC 333 (Abu Dhabi) – Jacob Malkoun		2–0	26–4
(Serbia)	Vlasto Čepo	31	6 ft 0 in (1.83 m)	El Chapo	Loss – UFC Fight Night 283 (Belgrade) – Gilbert Urbina		0–1	14–4
(China)	Yilizhati Maimaitijiang	27	6 ft 4 in (1.93 m)		Draw – Road to UFC Season 5: Semifinals (Shanghai) – Tre'ston Vines		0–0–1	7–1–1
(France)	Matthieu Letho Duclos	31	6 ft 3 in (1.91 m)		UFC Fight Night 295 (Riyadh) – Modestino Rodrigues		1–0	11–3
(United States)	Nick Galanti	28	6 ft 1 in (1.85 m)		Win – UFC Fight Night 291 (Edmonton) – Julien Leblanc		1–0	10–1
(United States)	Joseph Kropschot	31	6 ft 3 in (1.91 m)	The Land Animal	Win – UFC Fight Night 292 (Las Vegas) – Nick Klein		1–0	10–3

=== Welterweights (170 lb, 77 kg) ===
ISO	Name	Age	Ht.	Nickname	Result / next fight / status	Ref	Endeavor record	MMA record		
(United States)	Max Holloway	34	5 ft 11 in (1.80 m)	Blessed	Win – UFC 329 (Las Vegas) – Conor McGregor		24–9	28–9		
(Iceland)	Gunnar Nelson	38	5 ft 11 in (1.80 m)	Gunni			10–6	19–6–1		
(United States)	Neil Magny	39	6 ft 3 in (1.91 m)	The Haitian Sensation	Win - UFC 330 (Philadelphia) – Ramiz Brahimaj		25–13	32–14		
(Republic of Ireland)	Conor McGregor	38	5 ft 9 in (1.75 m)	Notorious	Loss – UFC 329 (Las Vegas) – Max Holloway (July 19, 2026) – ACL and torn meniscus		10–5	22–7		
(Argentina)	Santiago Ponzinibbio	40	6 ft 0 in (1.83 m)	Gente Boa	Loss – UFC Fight Night 282 (Abu Dhabi) – Sam Patterson		12–9	30–10		
(Australia)	Jake Matthews	32	5 ft 11 in (1.80 m)	The Celtic Kid	Loss – UFC Fight Night 294 (Al Rayyan) – Tahir Abdullayev		16–9	23–9		
(England)	Leon Edwards	35	6 ft 0 in (1.83 m)	Rocky	(May 25, 2026) – Undisclosed reasons – Bout not scheduled – UFC 329 (Las Vegas) – Daniel Rodriguez		14–5 (1 NC)	22–6 (1 NC)		
(Russia)	Islam Makhachev (c)	35	5 ft 10 in (1.78 m)		(October 23, 2026) – Undisclosed reasons – Out of UFC 336 (Toronto) – Carlos Prates		18–1	29–1		
(Denmark)	Nicolas Dalby	42	5 ft 11 in (1.80 m)	Lokomotivo	(May 5, 2026) – Undisclosed injury – Bout cancelled – UFC Fight Night 276 (Las Vegas) – Jeremiah Wells		8–5–1 (2 NC)	24–6–1 (2 NC)		
(Jamaica)	Randy Brown	36	6 ft 3 in (1.91 m)	Rude Boy	Loss – UFC Fight Night 292 (Las Vegas) – Jacobe Smith		14–9	20–9		
(United States)	Belal Muhammad	38	5 ft 10 in (1.78 m)	Remember the Name	Loss – UFC Fight Night 278 (Las Vegas) – Gabriel Bonfim		15–5 (1 NC)	24–5 (1 NC)		
(Norway)	Jack Hermansson	38	6 ft 1 in (1.85 m)	The Joker			11–8	24–10		
(Russia)	Muslim Salikhov	42	5 ft 11 in (1.80 m)	King of Kung Fu	Loss – UFC Fight Night 288 (Glendale) – Ignacio Bahamondes		9–6	22–7		
(United States)	Geoff Neal	36	5 ft 11 in (1.80 m)	Handz of Steel	UFC Fight Night 296 (Dallas) – Chris Curtis		8–6	16–8		
(United States)	Kevin Holland	34	6 ft 3 in (1.91 m)	Trailblazer	Draw - UFC 334 (New York City) – Uroš Medić		16–12–1 (1 NC)	29–15–1 (1 NC)		
(Spain)	Joel Álvarez	33	6 ft 3 in (1.91 m)	El Fenomeno	Loss - UFC 330 (Philadelphia) – Chidi Njokuani		8–4	23–5	3–7	18–9
(United States)	Sean Brady	33	5 ft 9 in (1.75 m)		UFC Fight Night 297 (Las Vegas) – Gabriel Bonfim		9–2	19–2		
(United States)	Punahele Soriano	34	6 ft 0 in (1.83 m)	Story Time	Loss – UFC Fight Night 287 (Paris) – Daniil Donchenko		7–5	13–5		
(United States)	Khaos Williams	32	6 ft 0 in (1.83 m)	Khaos The Ox Fighter	Loss – UFC 332 (Salt Lake City) – Roberto Soldić		7–5	16–6		
(United States)	Joaquin Buckley	32	5 ft 8 in (1.73 m)	New Mansa	Loss – UFC Fight Night 291 (Edmonton) – Mike Malott		11–7	21–9		
(United States)	Daniel Rodriguez	39	6 ft 2 in (1.88 m)	D-Rod	UFC Fight Night 296 (Dallas) – Roberto Soldić		10–5	20–6		
(Kazakhstan)	Shavkat Rakhmonov	32	6 ft 1 in (1.85 m)	Nomad	(January 31, 2026) – Knee injury – Unable to compete for nine-to-ten months		7–0	19–0		
(United States)	Ramiz Brahimaj	34	5 ft 10 in (1.78 m)		Loss - UFC 330 (Philadelphia) – Neil Magny		5–5	13–7		
(Serbia)	Uroš Medić	33	6 ft 1 in (1.85 m)	The Doctor	Draw - UFC 334 (New York City) – Kevin Holland		8–3–1	14–3–1		
(Chile)	Ignacio Bahamondes	29	6 ft 3 in (1.91 m)	La Jaula	UFC Fight Night 296 (Dallas) – Chidi Njokuani		7–4	18–7		
(United States)	Jeremiah Wells	40	5 ft 9 in (1.75 m)		Win - UFC 330 (Philadelphia) – Myktybek Orolbai		6–2	14–4–1		
(United States)	Chris Curtis	39	5 ft 10 in (1.78 m)	The Action Man	UFC Fight Night 296 (Dallas) – Geoff Neal		6–5 (1 NC)	32–13 (1 NC)		
(Republic of Ireland)	Ian Machado Garry	29	6 ft 3 in (1.91 m)	The Future	UFC Fight Night 295 (Riyadh) – Yaroslav Amosov		10–2	17–2		
(Australia)	Jack Della Maddalena	30	5 ft 11 in (1.80 m)		Loss – UFC Fight Night 275 (Perth) – Carlos Prates		8–2	18–4		
(Ecuador)	Michael Morales	27	6 ft 0 in (1.83 m)		UFC 336 (Toronto) – Carlos Prates		7–0	19–0		
(United States)	Chidi Njokuani	37	6 ft 3 in (1.91 m)	Chidi Bang Bang	UFC Fight Night 296 (Dallas) – Ignacio Bahamondes		6–5	26–12 (1 NC)		
(Canada)	Mike Malott	35	6 ft 1 in (1.85 m)	Proper	Win – UFC Fight Night 291 (Edmonton) – Joaquin Buckley		8–1	15–2–1		
(Brazil)	Gabriel Bonfim	29	6 ft 1 in (1.85 m)	Marretinha	UFC Fight Night 297 (Las Vegas) – Sean Brady		6–1	19–1		
(England)	Sam Patterson	30	6 ft 3 in (1.91 m)	The Future	UFC Fight Night 298 (Sydney) – Jonathan Micallef		5–2	15–3–1		
(United States)	Bassil Hafez	34	5 ft 11 in (1.80 m)	The Habibi	(March 20, 2026) – Tested positive for ipamorelin – Suspended for 12 months until March 20, 2027		1–2	9–5–1		
(United States)	Jonny Parsons	35	5 ft 9 in (1.75 m)	The Sluggernaut	Loss – UFC Fight Night 293 (Las Vegas) – José Henrique Souza		1–1	9–4		
(United States)	Billy Ray Goff	28	5 ft 10 in (1.78 m)		Loss – UFC Fight Night 284 (Las Vegas) – Ty Miller		1–3	9–5		
(United States)	Charles Radtke	36	5 ft 9 in (1.75 m)	Chuck Buffalo	Loss – UFC 334 (New York City) – Stephen Thompson		5–3	12–6		
(Kyrgyzstan)	Myktybek Orolbai	28	5 ft 10 in (1.78 m)	Kyrgyz	Loss - UFC 330 (Philadelphia) – Jeremiah Wells		5–2	16–3–1		
(Brazil)	Carlos Prates	33	6 ft 1 in (1.85 m)	Carlão	UFC 336 (Toronto) – Michael Morales		7–1	24–7		
(Wales)	Oban Elliott	28	6 ft 0 in (1.83 m)	The Welsh Gangster	Loss – UFC Fight Night 283 (Belgrade) – Michael Oliveira		3–3	12–5		
(Kazakhstan)	Nikolay Veretennikov	36	6 ft 1 in (1.85 m)		UFC 335 (Las Vegas) – Ronald Humphrey		2–4	14–8		
(Brazil)	Carlos Leal	32	5 ft 11 in (1.80 m)	The Lion	(October 3, 2026) – Injury – Out of UFC Fight Night 292 (Las Vegas) – Randy Brown		2–2	23–7		
(United States)	Jacobe Smith	30	5 ft 10 in (1.78 m)	Cobe	Win – UFC Fight Night 292 (Las Vegas) – Randy Brown		5–0	14–0		
(Australia)	Jonathan Micallef	27	6 ft 0 in (1.83 m)	The Captain	UFC Fight Night 298 (Sydney) – Sam Patterson		3–0	10–1		
(United States)	Austin Vanderford	36	5 ft 11 in (1.80 m)	The Gentleman	(January 22, 2026) – Undisclosed reasons – Out of UFC Fight Night 267 (Houston) – Jean-Paul Lebosnoyani		1–1	13–3		
(South Korea)	Ko Seok-hyeon	33	5 ft 10 in (1.78 m)	The Korean Tyson	Win – UFC Fight Night 293 (Las Vegas) – Wellington Turman		3–1	14–3		
(Germany)	Islam Dulatov	28	6 ft 3 in (1.91 m)	The Ripper	UFC Fight Night 295 (Riyadh) – Levan Chokheli		1–0	12–1		
(United States)	Eric Nolan	29	6 ft 0 in (1.83 m)	Night Time	Win – UFC 332 (Salt Lake City) – Court McGee		1–2	9–5		
(China)	Taiyilake Nueraji	25	6 ft 2 in (1.88 m)	Super Saiyan	(August 20, 2026) – Unknown reasons – Pulled out of Road to UFC Season 5: Semifinals (Shanghai) – Darrius Flowers		1–0	12–1 (1 NC)		
(Brazil)	Rodrigo Sezinando	28	6 ft 0 in (1.83 m)		Win – UFC Fight Night 292 (Las Vegas) – Theodor Berggren		1–1	9–2		
(Ukraine)	Daniil Donchenko	25	5 ft 11 in (1.80 m)		Win – UFC Fight Night 287 (Paris) – Punahele Soriano		4–0	15–2		
(Ukraine)	Yaroslav Amosov	33	5 ft 11 in (1.80 m)	Dynamo	UFC Fight Night 295 (Riyadh) – Ian Machado Garry		2–0	30–1		
(United States)	Ty Miller	26	6 ft 2 in (1.88 m)	Thriller	Win – UFC Fight Night 284 (Las Vegas) – Billy Ray Goff		2–0	8–0		
(United States)	Jean-Paul Lebosnoyani	27	5 ft 11 in (1.80 m)	Mufasa	Win – UFC Fight Night 292 (Las Vegas) – Farman Hasanov		3–0	12–2		
(Chile)	Victor Valenzuela	32	5 ft 9 in (1.75 m)	Psicosis	Win – UFC Fight Night 274 (Las Vegas) – Max Griffin		1–0	14–4		
(China)	Ding Meng	32	6 ft 2 in (1.88 m)	The Ruthless Assassin	Loss – UFC Fight Night 286 (Shanghai) – Cameron Nelson		0–2	35–11		
(Brazil)	José Henrique Souza	24	6 ft 3 in (1.91 m)	Canela	Win – UFC Fight Night 293 – Jonny Parsons		2–0	10–1		
(United States)	Leon Shahbazyan	31	6 ft 4 in (1.93 m)	S.O.G.	Loss – UFC Fight Night 290 (Las Vegas) – Niko Price		0–2	12–6		
(Georgia (country))	Levan Chokheli	30	5 ft 11 in (1.80 m)		UFC Fight Night 295 (Riyadh) – Islam Dulatov		1–0	15–3		
(Azerbaijan)	Tahir Abdullayev	29	5 ft 8 in (1.73 m)	Tank	UFC Fight Night 294 (Al Rayyan) – Jake Matthews		2–0	21–3		
(Brazil)	Jefferson Nascimento	28	5 ft 8 in (1.73 m)	Toddynho	(October 8, 2026) – Injury – Bout cancelled – UFC 334 (New York City) – Nazim Sadykhov / Moving to Lightweight		0–1	13–1		
(Sweden)	Theodor Berggren	26	5 ft 11 in (1.80 m)	Simba	Loss – UFC Fight Night 292 (Las Vegas) – Rodrigo Sezinando		0–2	8–5		
(Azerbaijan)	Farman Hasanov	31	5 ft 11 in (1.80 m)		Loss – UFC Fight Night 292 (Las Vegas) – Jean-Paul Lebosnoyani		1–1	5–1		
(Brazil)	Michael Oliveira	28	6 ft 1 in (1.85 m)	PQD / The Missile	Win – UFC Fight Night 283 (Belgrade) – Oban Elliott		1–0	10–0		
(Canada)	Cameron Nelson	28	5 ft 11 in (1.80 m)		UFC 336 (Toronto) – Sean Clancy Jr.		1–0	8–1		
(United States)	Bruce Whitehead	29	5 ft 10 in (1.78 m)	The Goose	Loss – UFC 332 (Salt Lake City) – Jacobe Smith		0–1	8–3		
(Croatia)	Roberto Soldić	31	5 ft 11 in (1.80 m)	Robocop	UFC Fight Night 296 (Dallas) – Daniel Rodriguez		1–0	22–4 (1 NC)		

=== Lightweights (155 lb, 70 kg) ===
ISO	Name	Age	Ht.	Nickname	Result / next fight / status	Ref	Endeavor record	MMA record
(United States)	Jeremy Stephens	40	5 ft 9 in (1.75 m)	Lil Heathen	Loss - UFC 328 (Newark) – King Green		15–20 (1 NC)	29–23 (1 NC)
(Brazil)	Rafael dos Anjos	42	5 ft 8 in (1.73 m)		Loss – UFC 332 (Salt Lake City) – Alexander Hernandez		21–16	32–18
(United States)	Jim Miller	43	5 ft 8 in (1.73 m)	A-10	Loss – UFC 334 (New York City) – Terrance McKinney		28–19 (1 NC)	39–20 (1 NC)
(Brazil)	Charles Oliveira	37	5 ft 10 in (1.78 m)	Do Bronx	UFC 335 (Las Vegas) – Diego Lopes		25–11 (1 NC)	37–11 (1 NC)
(United States)	Michael Johnson	40	5 ft 9 in (1.75 m)	The Menace	UFC 336 (Toronto) – Lance Gibson Jr.		16–16	24–20
(United States)	King Green *	40	5 ft 10 in (1.78 m)	King	Loss – UFC 332 (Salt Lake City) – Esteban Ribovics		21–14–1 (1 NC)	36–18–1 (1 NC)
(United States)	Drew Dober	38	5 ft 8 in (1.73 m)		Loss – UFC 334 (New York City) – Chris Duncan		15–10 (1 NC)	29–16 (1 NC)
(United States)	Beneil Dariush	37	5 ft 10 in (1.78 m)		Loss – UFC Fight Night 275 (Perth) – Quillan Salkilld		17–8–1	23–8–1
(New Zealand)	Dan Hooker	36	6 ft 0 in (1.83 m)	The Hangman	Win – UFC Fight Night 294 (Al Rayyan) – Brian Ortega		15–11	25–15
(Brazil)	Carlos Diego Ferreira	42	5 ft 8 in (1.73 m)		UFC Fight Night 296 (Dallas) – MarQuel Mederos		11–7	20–7
(Brazil)	Renato Moicano	37	5 ft 11 in (1.80 m)	Money Moicano	Loss – UFC Fight Night 292 (Las Vegas) – Tom Nolan		13–8	21–8–1
(Brazil)	Joaquim Silva	37	5 ft 8 in (1.73 m)	Netto BJJ			7–5	14–5
(Denmark)	Damir Hadžović	40	5 ft 11 in (1.80 m)	The Bosnian Bomber			4–6	14–8
(Peru)	Claudio Puelles	30	5 ft 11 in (1.80 m)	Prince of Peru			5–4	12–5
(United States)	Drakkar Klose	38	5 ft 8 in (1.73 m)		Loss – UFC Fight Night 288 (Glendale) – Thomas Gantt		10–4	16–4–1
(United States)	Jared Gordon	38	5 ft 9 in (1.75 m)	Flash	Loss – UFC 334 (New York City) – Melquizael Costa		9–9 (1 NC)	21–10 (1 NC)
(United States)	Justin Gaethje (c)	38	5 ft 11 in (1.80 m)	The Highlight	Win – UFC Freedom 250 (Washington) – Ilia Topuria		11–5	28–5
(Morocco)	Nasrat Haqparast	31	5 ft 10 in (1.78 m)		Loss – UFC Fight Night 285 (Sacramento) – Chris Padilla		10–6	18–7
(United States)	Matt Frevola	36	5 ft 9 in (1.75 m)	Steamrolla			5–6–1	11–6–1
(United States)	Alexander Hernandez	34	5 ft 9 in (1.75 m)	The Great / El Gran Chango	Win – UFC 332 (Salt Lake City) – Rafael dos Anjos		11–8	19–9
(United States)	Jalin Turner	31	6 ft 3 in (1.91 m)		Win - UFC 330 (Philadelphia) – Kauê Fernandes		9–6	16–9
(Nigeria)	Sodiq Yusuff	33	5 ft 9 in (1.75 m)	Super			6–4	13–5
(Canada)	Kyle Nelson	35	5 ft 11 in (1.80 m)	The Monster	Loss – UFC Fight Night 291 (Edmonton) – Cristian Pérez		5–8–1	17–8–1
(United States)	Grant Dawson	32	5 ft 10 in (1.78 m)	The Prophet	Win – UFC 333 (Abu Dhabi) – Nurullo Aliev		13–2–1	25–3–1
(Azerbaijan)	Rafael Fiziev	33	5 ft 8 in (1.73 m)	Ataman	Win – UFC Fight Night 280 (Baku) – Manuel Torres		9–5	14–5
(Armenia)	Arman Tsarukyan	30	5 ft 9 in (1.75 m)	The Batman	Win – UFC 331 (Los Angeles) – Maurício Ruffy		11–2	24–3
(United States)	Mike Davis	34	6 ft 0 in (1.83 m)	Beast Boy	Loss – UFC Fight Night 282 (Abu Dhabi) – Nurullo Aliev		5–3	12–4
(Canada)	Kyle Prepolec	37	5 ft 10 in (1.78 m)	Kill Shot	Loss – UFC Fight Night 283 (Belgrade) – Mateusz Rębecki		0–5	18–11
(France)	Farès Ziam	29	6 ft 1 in (1.85 m)	Smile Killer	Loss – UFC Fight Night 287 (Paris) – Axel Sola		8–4	18–6
(Germany)	Ottman Azaitar	36	5 ft 8 in (1.73 m)	Bulldozer			2–3	13–3
(United States)	Billy Quarantillo	37	5 ft 10 in (1.78 m)		Loss – UFC Fight Night 284 (Las Vegas) – Carlos Diego Ferreira		6–6	18–8
(United States)	Chase Hooper	27	6 ft 1 in (1.85 m)	The Dream	UFC 335 (Las Vegas) – Chris Padilla		9–5	17–5–1
(United States)	Nate Landwehr	38	5 ft 9 in (1.75 m)	The Train	Loss – UFC Fight Night 291 (Edmonton) – Mandel Nallo		5–7	18–9
(United States)	Gabriel Green	33	5 ft 10 in (1.78 m)	Gifted			3–3	12–5
(England)	Jai Herbert	38	6 ft 1 in (1.85 m)	The Black Country Banger	Win – UFC Fight Night 290 (Las Vegas) – Matheus Camilo		5–5–1	15–6–1
(Slovakia)	Ľudovít Klein	31	5 ft 8 in (1.73 m)	Mr. Highlight	Loss – UFC Fight Night 283 (Belgrade) – Tofiq Musayev		8–4–1	24–6–1
(Georgia (country)) (Spain)	Ilia Topuria	29	5 ft 7 in (1.70 m)	El Matador	Loss – UFC Freedom 250 (Washington) – Justin Gaethje		9–1	17–1
(Poland)	Mateusz Gamrot	35	5 ft 10 in (1.78 m)	Gamer	(October 26, 2026) – Gamrot denied bout was taking place at UFC Fight Night 297 (Las Vegas) – Axel Sola		9–5	26–5 (1 NC)
(Wales)	Mason Jones	31	5 ft 10 in (1.78 m)	The Dragon	Loss – UFC Fight Night 285 (Sacramento) – MarQuel Mederos		4–3 (1 NC)	18–3 (1 NC)
(United States)	Michael Chandler	40	5 ft 8 in (1.73 m)	Iron	Loss – UFC Freedom 250 (Washington) – Maurício Ruffy		2–6	23–11
(Mexico)	Rafa García	32	5 ft 7 in (1.70 m)	Gifted	Loss – UFC Fight Night 288 (Glendale) – Rong Zhu		7–5	18–5
(China)	Rong Zhu	26	5 ft 9 in (1.75 m)		Win – UFC Fight Night 288 (Glendale) – Rafa García		5–3	29–6
(United States)	Terrance McKinney	32	5 ft 10 in (1.78 m)	T.Wrecks	Win – UFC 334 (New York City) – Jim Miller		9–6	19–9
(England)	Paddy Pimblett	31	5 ft 10 in (1.78 m)	The Baddy	Win – UFC 329 (Las Vegas) – Benoît Saint Denis		8–1	24–4
(France)	Benoît Saint Denis	30	5 ft 11 in (1.80 m)	God of War	UFC Fight Night 298 (Sydney) – Quillan Salkilld		9–4	17–4 (1 NC)
(Brazil)	Nikolas Motta	33	5 ft 9 in (1.75 m)	Iron	Loss – UFC Fight Night 294 (Al Rayyan) – Dom Mar Fan		3–4 (1 NC)	15–7 (1 NC)
(United States)	Trey Ogden	37	5 ft 11 in (1.80 m)	Shamurai	(May 11, 2026) – Injury – Out of UFC Fight Night 276 (Las Vegas) – Thomas Gantt		2–3 (1 NC)	17–7 (1 NC)
(United States)	Evan Elder	29	5 ft 10 in (1.78 m)	The Phenom	Win – UFC 334 (New York City) – Samuel Sanches		4–2	11–2
(Mexico)	Manuel Torres	31	5 ft 10 in (1.78 m)	El Loco	Loss – UFC Fight Night 280 (Baku) – Rafael Fiziev		5–2	17–4
(China)	Maheshate Hayisaer	26	6 ft 0 in (1.83 m)		Win – Road to UFC Season 5: Semifinals (Shanghai) – Darrius Flowers		3–4	12–5
(Mexico)	Daniel Zellhuber	27	6 ft 1 in (1.85 m)	Golden Boy	Loss – UFC Fight Night 268 (Mexico City) – King Green		3–4	15–4
(Poland)	Mateusz Rębecki	34	5 ft 7 in (1.70 m)	Chińczyk	UFC Fight Night 295 (Riyadh) – Elves Brener		5–4	21–5
(Brazil)	Melquizael Costa	30	5 ft 10 in (1.78 m)	The Dalmatian	Win – UFC 334 (New York City) – Jared Gordon		8–3	27–8
(India)	Anshul Jubli	31	6 ft 0 in (1.83 m)	King of Lions			1–2	7–2
(Brazil)	Elves Brener	29	5 ft 10 in (1.78 m)		UFC Fight Night 295 (Riyadh) – Mateusz Rębecki		4–3	17–6
(Argentina)	Francisco Prado	24	5 ft 10 in (1.78 m)		Win – UFC Fight Night 290 (Las Vegas) – Ismael Bonfim		2–5	13–5
(Azerbaijan)	Nazim Sadykhov	32	5 ft 10 in (1.78 m)	Black Wolf	(October 8, 2026) – Nascimento injury – Bout cancelled – UFC 334 (New York City) – Jefferson Nascimento		4–2–1	11–3–1
(Tajikistan)	Nurullo Aliev	27	5 ft 10 in (1.78 m)	Tajik Eagle	Loss – UFC 333 (Abu Dhabi) – Grant Dawson		4–1	11–1
(Argentina)	Esteban Ribovics	30	5 ft 10 in (1.78 m)	Gringo	Win – UFC 332 (Salt Lake City) – King Green		6–3	17–3
(Scotland)	Chris Duncan	33	5 ft 10 in (1.78 m)	The Problem	Win – UFC 334 (New York City) – Drew Dober		7–2	16–2
(United States)	Darrius Flowers	32	5 ft 9 in (1.75 m)	Beast Mode	Loss – Road to UFC Season 5: Semifinals (Shanghai) – Maheshate Hayisaer		1–4	13–9–1
(United States)	Charlie Campbell	31	6 ft 0 in (1.83 m)	The Cannibel			2–1	9–3
(Brazil)	Kauê Fernandes	31	5 ft 9 in (1.75 m)		Loss - UFC 330 (Philadelphia) – Jalin Turner		3–2	11–3
(Australia)	Tom Nolan	26	6 ft 3 in (1.91 m)	Big Train	Win – UFC Fight Night 292 (Las Vegas) – Renato Moicano		6–1	12–1
(United States)	MarQuel Mederos	29	5 ft 10 in (1.78 m)		UFC Fight Night 296 (Dallas) – Carlos Diego Ferreira		4–0–1	12–1–1
(Palestine)	Abdul-Kareem Al-Selwady	31	5 ft 8 in (1.73 m)	Pride of Palestine	Win – UFC Fight Night 270 (London) – Shaqueme Rock		1–1	16–4
(United States)	Mitch Ramirez	34	5 ft 11 in (1.80 m)	The Fight Stalker	Loss – UFC Fight Night 281 (Oklahoma City) – Chase Hooper		0–3	8–4
(United States)	Chris Padilla	31	5 ft 9 in (1.75 m)	Taco	UFC 335 (Las Vegas) – Chase Hooper		5–0–1	18–6–1
(Brazil)	Maurício Ruffy	30	5 ft 11 in (1.80 m)		Loss – UFC 331 (Los Angeles) – Arman Tsarukyan		5–2	14–3
(Australia)	Quillan Salkilld	26	6 ft 0 in (1.83 m)		UFC Fight Night 298 (Sydney) – Benoît Saint Denis		6–0	13–1
(United States)	Kody Steele	31	5 ft 9 in (1.75 m)		Win – UFC 333 (Abu Dhabi) – Noah Gugnon		2–1	9–1
(United States)	Gauge Young	26	5 ft 9 in (1.75 m)	Gee Money	Loss – UFC Fight Night 285 (Sacramento) – Stanley Dorsainvil		2–2	13–4
(Brazil)	Matheus Camilo	25	5 ft 10 in (1.78 m)		Loss – UFC Fight Night 290 (Las Vegas) – Jai Herbert		2–2	10–4
(United States)	Mark Choinski	31	5 ft 8 in (1.73 m)	The Shark			0–1	7–1
(Azerbaijan)	Tofiq Musayev	36	5 ft 10 in (1.78 m)		Win – UFC Fight Night 283 (Belgrade) – Ľudovít Klein		2–1	24–6
(France)	Axel Sola	29	5 ft 11 in (1.80 m)		(October 26, 2026) – Gamrot denied bout was taking place at UFC Fight Night 297 (Las Vegas) – Mateusz Gamrot		3–1	13–1–1
(Canada)	Lance Gibson Jr.	31	5 ft 10 in (1.78 m)	Fearless	UFC 336 (Toronto) – Michael Johnson		1–1	10–2
(Australia)	Dom Mar Fan	26	5 ft 11 in (1.80 m)	Street Buddha	Win – UFC Fight Night 294 (Al Rayyan) – Nikolas Motta		2–1	10–3
(United States)	Josiah Harrell	28	5 ft 7 in (1.70 m)	Muscle Hamster	Loss – UFC Fight Night 289 (Las Vegas) – Elves Brener		0–2	11–2
(Brazil)	Manoel Sousa	29	5 ft 9 in (1.75 m)	Manumito	(September 28, 2026) – UFC Fight Night 294 (Al Rayyan) – TBD		2–0	15–1
(Canada)	Mandel Nallo	37	6 ft 0 in (1.83 m)	Mango / Rat Garbage	Win – UFC Fight Night 291 (Edmonton) – Nate Landwehr		1–1	15–4
(United States)	Lucas Brennan	26	5 ft 10 in (1.78 m)	Skywalker	(October 29, 2026) – Torn ACL – Out of UFC Fight Night 293 (Las Vegas) – Austin Bashi / Moving to Featherweight		0–1	11–3
(United States)	Thomas Gantt	33	5 ft 11 in (1.80 m)		Win – UFC Fight Night 288 (Glendale) – Drakkar Klose		2–0	13–0
(Ukraine)	Artur Minev	22	5 ft 9 in (1.75 m)	Headhunter	(September 10, 2026) – Unknown reasons – Out of UFC Fight Night 290 (Las Vegas) – Francisco Prado		0–1	7–1
(Russia)	Magomed Zaynukov	31	5 ft 10 in (1.78 m)	Wild Chanco	UFC Fight Night 296 (Dallas) – Piero Guaylupo		1–0	8–0
(Poland)	Damian Rzepecki	24	5 ft 10 in (1.78 m)	The Butcher	Loss – UFC Fight Night 282 (Abu Dhabi) – Magomed Zaynukov		0–1	10–1
(Montenegro)	Miloš Janičić	29	5 ft 11 in (1.80 m)	Cobra	Loss – UFC Fight Night 283 (Belgrade) – Noah Gugnon		0–1	19–4
(France)	Noah Gugnon	26	5 ft 11 in (1.80 m)		Loss – UFC 333 (Abu Dhabi) – Kody Steele		1–1	10–3
(United States)	Richie Miranda	32	5 ft 8 in (1.73 m)	El Machete	Loss – UFC Fight Night 284 (Las Vegas) – Manoel Sousa		0–1	13–2
(United States)	Stanley Dorsainvil	26	5 ft 9 in (1.75 m)	The Drill	Win – UFC Fight Night 285 (Sacramento) – Gauge Young		1–0	6–0
(France)	Salahdine Parnasse	28	5 ft 10 in (1.78 m)	Lion of Atlas	Win – UFC Fight Night 287 (Paris) – Dan Hooker		1–0	24–2
(Mexico)	Cristian Pérez	27	5 ft 9 in (1.75 m)	Puas	Win – UFC Fight Night 291 (Edmonton) – Kyle Nelson		1–0	16–2
(Brazil)	Samuel Sanches	23	5 ft 10 in (1.78 m)	The Prodigy	Loss – UFC 334 (New York City) – Evan Elder		0–1	11–2
(England)	Shoaib Yousaf	31	5 ft 11 in (1.80 m)	The Assassin	Loss – UFC Fight Night 294 (Al Rayyan) – John Mitchell		0–1	14–4
(Republic of Ireland)	John Mitchell	31	6 ft 1 in (1.85 m)	The Cork Horse	Win – UFC Fight Night 294 (Al Rayyan) – Shoaib Yousaf		1–0	12–3

=== Featherweights (145 lb, 65 kg) ===
ISO	Name	Age	Ht.	Nickname	Result / next fight / status	Ref	Endeavor record	MMA record
(United States)	Andre Fili	36	5 ft 11 in (1.80 m)	Touchy	Win – UFC Fight Night 290 (Las Vegas) – Kai Kamaka III		14–13 (1 NC)	26–14 (1 NC)
(United States)	Aljamain Sterling	37	5 ft 7 in (1.70 m)	Funk Master	Loss – UFC Fight Night 294 (Al Rayyan) – Kevin Vallejos		18–6	26–6
(Mexico)	Yair Rodríguez	34	5 ft 11 in (1.80 m)	El Pantera	UFC Fight Night 296 (Dallas) – Steve Garcia		11–5 (1 NC)	16–5 (1 NC)
(South Korea)	Choi Doo-ho	35	5 ft 10 in (1.78 m)	The Korean Superboy	Loss – UFC 331 (Los Angeles) – Patrício Pitbull		6–4–1	17–5–1
(England)	Arnold Allen	32	5 ft 8 in (1.73 m)	Almighty	(September 18, 2026) – Injury – Out of UFC 333 (Abu Dhabi) – Aaron Pico		12–3	21–4
(United States)	Josh Emmett	41	5 ft 7 in (1.70 m)	CC0	Loss – UFC Fight Night 269 (Las Vegas) – Kevin Vallejos		10–7	19–7
(Australia)	Alexander Volkanovski (c)	38	5 ft 6 in (1.68 m)	The Great	Win – UFC 333 (Abu Dhabi) – Movsar Evloev		16–3	29–4
(United States)	Calvin Kattar	38	5 ft 11 in (1.80 m)	The Boston Finisher			7–7	23–9
(United States)	Dan Ige	35	5 ft 7 in (1.70 m)	100 Grand	Loss – UFC Fight Night 288 (Glendale) – David Martínez / Moving to Bantamweight		11–11	19–12
(England)	Nathaniel Wood	33	5 ft 6 in (1.68 m)	The Prospect	Loss – UFC Fight Night 287 (Paris) – Pavel Andrusca		11–4	24–7
(Russia)	Movsar Evloev	34	5 ft 8 in (1.73 m)		Loss – UFC 333 (Abu Dhabi) – Alexander Volkanovski		10–1	20–1
(England)	Lerone Murphy	35	5 ft 10 in (1.78 m)	The Miracle	Loss – UFC Fight Night 270 (London) – Movsar Evloev		9–1–1	17–1–1
(United States)	Miles Johns	32	5 ft 7 in (1.70 m)	Chapo	Win – UFC Fight Night 284 (Las Vegas) – Gianni Vázquez		7–5 (1 NC)	16–5 (1 NC)
(United States)	Sean Woodson	34	6 ft 2 in (1.88 m)	The Sniper	Win – UFC Fight Night 286 (Shanghai) – Jack Jenkins		8–2–1	14–2–1
(Morocco)	Youssef Zalal	30	5 ft 10 in (1.78 m)	The Moroccan Devil	Loss – UFC Fight Night 274 (Las Vegas) – Aljamain Sterling		8–4–1	18–6–1
(United States)	Steve Garcia	34	6 ft 0 in (1.83 m)	Mean Machine	UFC Fight Night 296 (Dallas) – Yair Rodríguez		8–3	19–6
(United States)	Jamall Emmers	37	5 ft 10 in (1.78 m)	Pretty Boy	Win – UFC Fight Night 285 (Sacramento) – Lerryan Douglas		6–4	23–8
(United States)	Kai Kamaka III	31	5 ft 7 in (1.70 m)	The Fighting Hawaiian	Loss – UFC Fight Night 290 (Las Vegas) – Andre Fili		2–4–1	18–9–1
(United States)	Jordan Leavitt	31	5 ft 11 in (1.80 m)	The Monkey King	Loss – UFC Fight Night 278 (Las Vegas) – Joanderson Brito		6–4	13–4
(United States)	Pat Sabatini	36	5 ft 8 in (1.73 m)		UFC Fight Night 297 (Las Vegas) – Vinicius Oliveira		9–2	22–5
(Armenia)	Melsik Baghdasaryan	34	5 ft 9 in (1.75 m)	The Gun	Loss – UFC Fight Night 279 (Las Vegas) – Murtazali Magomedov		3–3	8–4
(United States)	Ricky Turcios	33	5 ft 9 in (1.75 m)	Pretty Ricky	Loss – UFC 326 (Las Vegas) – Alberto Montes		2–4	12–6
(Uganda)	David Onama	32	5 ft 11 in (1.80 m)	Silent Assassin			6–3	14–3
(Brazil)	Joanderson Brito	31	5 ft 8 in (1.73 m)	Tubarão	UFC Fight Night 298 (Sydney) – Kaan Ofli		8–3	20–5–1
(United States)	Christian Rodriguez	28	5 ft 7 in (1.70 m)	CeeRod	Win – UFC Fight Night 279 (Las Vegas) – Hyder Amil		6–4	13–4
(Brazil)	Daniel Santos	31	5 ft 7 in (1.70 m)	Willycat	Win – UFC 333 (Abu Dhabi) – Bolaji Oki		5–2	14–3
(United States)	Francis Marshall	27	5 ft 9 in (1.75 m)	Fire	Loss – UFC Fight Night 292 (Las Vegas) – Dakota Hope		4–4	10–4
(China)	Yi Zha	29	5 ft 7 in (1.70 m)		Loss – UFC 325 (Sydney) – Kaan Ofli		1–3	26–6
(Australia)	Jack Jenkins	33	5 ft 7 in (1.70 m)	Phar	Loss – UFC Fight Night 286 (Shanghai) – Sean Woodson		4–3	14–5
(United States)	Trevor Peek	31	5 ft 9 in (1.75 m)		Loss – UFC Fight Night 287 (Paris) – Kurtis Campbell		2–4	9–4 (1 NC)
(Brazil)	Gabriel Santos	29	5 ft 9 in (1.75 m)	Mosquitinho	UFC Fight Night 295 (Riyadh) – Luke Riley		2–2	12–2
(Peru)	Gastón Bolaños	34	5 ft 7 in (1.70 m)	The Dreamkiller	(October 8, 2026) – Eye laceration – Out of UFC Fight Night 292 (Las Vegas) – Francis Marshall		3–2	9–5
(United States)	Marcus McGhee	36	5 ft 8 in (1.73 m)	The Maniac	Win – UFC 332 (Salt Lake City) – Anthony Romero		6–1	12–2
(Mexico)	Fernando Padilla	29	6 ft 1 in (1.85 m)	El Valiente			2–2	16–6
(Brazil)	Diego Lopes	31	5 ft 11 in (1.80 m)		UFC 335 (Las Vegas) – Charles Oliveira / Moving to Lightweight		7–3	28–8
(United States)	Chepe Mariscal	34	5 ft 7 in (1.70 m)	Machine Gun			5–1	18–7
(France)	Morgan Charrière	31	5 ft 8 in (1.73 m)	The Last Pirate	Loss – UFC Fight Night 287 (Paris) – Felipe Lima		3–4	21–13–1
(Italy)	Manolo Zecchini	30	5 ft 8 in (1.73 m)	Angelo Veneziano	Loss – UFC Fight Night 272 (Las Vegas) – Tommy McMillen		0–2	11–5
(Brazil)	Jean Silva	29	5 ft 7 in (1.70 m)	Lord	Win – UFC Fight Night 288 (Glendale) – Jose Miguel Delgado		7–1	18–3
(United States)	Ramon Taveras	32	5 ft 8 in (1.73 m)	The Savage	(May 9, 2026) – Undisclosed reasons – Out of UFC Fight Night 277 (Macau) – Zhu Kangjie		1–2	10–4
(United States)	Hyder Amil	36	5 ft 9 in (1.75 m)	The Hurricane	Loss – UFC Fight Night 279 (Las Vegas) – Christian Rodriguez		3–3	11–3
(Belgium)	Bolaji Oki	31	5 ft 10 in (1.78 m)	The Zulu Warrior	Loss – UFC 333 (Abu Dhabi) – Daniel Santos		2–4	10–5
(Brazil)	Vinicius Oliveira	30	5 ft 9 in (1.75 m)	Lok Dog	UFC Fight Night 297 (Las Vegas) – Pat Sabatini		5–1	24–4
(United States)	Danny Silva	29	5 ft 11 in (1.80 m)	El Puma	(August 4, 2026) – Withdrew due to pulmonary embolism – Bout cancelled – UFC Fight Night 285 (Sacramento) – Márcio Barbosa		3–1	11–2
(United States)	Steven Nguyen	33	5 ft 11 in (1.80 m)	The Ninja			1–1	10–2
(Brazil)	Felipe Lima	28	5 ft 6 in (1.68 m)	D'Ouro	Win – UFC Fight Night 287 (Paris) – Morgan Charrière		3–1	15–2
(Brazil)	Mairon Santos	26	5 ft 7 in (1.70 m)	A Lenda	UFC Fight Night 295 (Riyadh) – Akbar Abdullaev / Moving to Lightweight		4–0	17–1
(Australia)	Kaan Ofli	33	5 ft 7 in (1.70 m)	Genghis	UFC Fight Night 298 (Sydney) – Joanderson Brito		3–2	14–4–1
(Mexico)	Roberto Romero	26	5 ft 7 in (1.70 m)	El Charro Negro			0–2	8–5–1
(United States)	Austin Bashi	25	5 ft 6 in (1.68 m)		Win – UFC Fight Night 293 (Las Vegas) – Carlos Calderon		2–2	15–2
(Austria)	Bogdan Grad	31	5 ft 8 in (1.73 m)	The Unleashed	Win – UFC Fight Night 283 (Belgrade) – Dennis Buzukja		2–2	16–4
(Mexico)	José Miguel Delgado	28	5 ft 11 in (1.80 m)		Loss – UFC Fight Night 288 (Glendale) – Jean Silva		4–2	12–3
(Argentina)	Kevin Vallejos	25	5 ft 7 in (1.70 m)	El Chino	Win – UFC Fight Night 294 (Al Rayyan) – Aljamain Sterling		5–0	19–1
(Brazil)	Patrício Pitbull	39	5 ft 6 in (1.68 m)		Win – UFC 331 (Los Angeles) – Choi Doo-ho		2–2	38–9
(Cuba)	Yadier del Valle	30	5 ft 8 in (1.73 m)	The Cuban Problem	UFC Fight Night 297 (Las Vegas) – Ezra Elliott		3–1	10–1
(United States)	Michael Aswell Jr.	26	5 ft 8 in (1.73 m)	The Texas Kid	Win – UFC 331 (Los Angeles) – Yoo Joo-sang		2–3	12–5
(South Korea)	Yoo Joo-sang	32	5 ft 9 in (1.75 m)	Zombie Jr.	UFC Fight Night 298 (Sydney) – Marwan Rahiki		1–2	9–2
(United States)	Aaron Pico	30	5 ft 8 in (1.73 m)		Win – UFC 333 (Abu Dhabi) – Losene Keita		2–1	15–5
(England)	Harry Hardwick	32	5 ft 10 in (1.78 m)	Houdini	Loss – UFC Fight Night 269 (Las Vegas) – Marwan Rahiki		0–2	13–5–1
(Poland)	Robert Ruchała	28	5 ft 10 in (1.78 m)	Faker	Loss – UFC Fight Night 272 (Las Vegas) – José Mauro Delano		0–2	11–3
(England)	Luke Riley	27	5 ft 9 in (1.75 m)		UFC Fight Night 295 (Riyadh) – Gabriel Santos		3–0	14–0
(Australia)	Isaac Thomson	24	5 ft 11 in (1.80 m)				0–1	9–3
(Japan)	Keiichiro Nakamura	27	5 ft 8 in (1.73 m)		Loss – UFC Fight Night 293 (Las Vegas) – Ollie Schmid		1–1	8–2
(Mexico)	Gianni Vázquez	32	5 ft 7 in (1.70 m)	Kriptonita	Loss – UFC Fight Night 284 (Las Vegas) – Miles Johns		0–2	14–7
(Colombia)	Javier Reyes	33	5 ft 7 in (1.70 m)	Blair	Loss – UFC Fight Night 280 (Baku) – Kaan Ofli		1–1	23–6
(Venezuela)	Alberto Montes	32	5 ft 7 in (1.70 m)	The Promise	Loss – UFC Fight Night 281 (Oklahoma City) – Tommy McMillen		1–1	12–2
(Morocco)	Marwan Rahiki	24	5 ft 8 in (1.73 m)	Freaky	UFC Fight Night 298 (Sydney) – Yoo Joo-sang		2–1	9–1
(Belgium)	Losene Keita	28	5 ft 7 in (1.70 m)	Black Panther	Loss – UFC 333 (Abu Dhabi) – Aaron Pico		1–2	17–3
(England)	Kurtis Campbell	24	5 ft 9 in (1.75 m)	The Pink Panther	Win – UFC Fight Night 287 (Paris) – Trevor Peek		1–1	9–1
(Brazil)	Lerryan Douglas	31	5 ft 9 in (1.75 m)	Gunslinger	Loss – UFC Fight Night 285 (Sacramento) – Jamall Emmers		1–1	14–6
(Brazil)	José Mauro Delano	30	5 ft 8 in (1.73 m)	Ze	Loss – UFC Fight Night 293 (Las Vegas) – Murtazali Magomedov		1–1	16–4
(United States)	Dakota Hope	29	5 ft 6 in (1.68 m)	Huracán	Win – UFC Fight Night 292 (Las Vegas) – Francis Marshall		1–1	12–2
(United States)	Tommy McMillen	28	6 ft 0 in (1.83 m)	Gun	Win – UFC Fight Night 288 (Glendale) – Marwan Rahiki		3–0	12–0
(Brazil)	Márcio Barbosa	28	5 ft 6 in (1.68 m)	Ticoto	Win - UFC Fight Night 285 (Sacramento) – Ryan Kuse		2–0	19–2
(Hungary)	Ollie Schmid	25	5 ft 11 in (1.80 m)	The Hungarian Stallion	Win – UFC Fight Night 293 (Las Vegas) – Keiichiro Nakamura		1–1	5–3
(China)	Zhu Kangjie	30	5 ft 8 in (1.73 m)	The Hypnotist / One Punch Man	Loss – UFC Fight Night 277 (Macau) – Rodrigo Vera		0–1	21–5 (1)
(Peru)	Rodrigo Vera	31	5 ft 7 in (1.70 m)	El Gato Loco	(September 4, 2026) – Visa issues – Bout cancelled – UFC Fight Night 288 (Glendale) – Ramiro Jimenez		1–0	22–1–1
(United States)	Shane Collins	26	5 ft 10 in (1.78 m)	Hollywood	Win – UFC Fight Night 279 (Las Vegas) – Otari Tanzilovi		1–0	8–0
(Kyrgyzstan)	Murtazali Magomedov	27	5 ft 9 in (1.75 m)	The Highlight	Win – UFC Fight Night 293 (Las Vegas) – José Mauro Delano		2–0	12–0
(United States)	Ezra Elliott	26	5 ft 9 in (1.75 m)		UFC Fight Night 297 (Las Vegas) – Yadier del Valle		1–0	8–0
(United States)	Damien Anderson	29	5 ft 8 in (1.73 m)	Demon Hands	Loss – UFC Fight Night 281 (Oklahoma City) – Ezra Elliott		0–1	5–1
(United States)	Ryan Kuse	32	5 ft 8 in (1.73 m)	Third Street Savage	Loss – UFC Fight Night 285 (Sacramento) – Márcio Barbosa		0–1	9–3
(Moldova)	Pavel Andrusca	24	5 ft 7 in (1.70 m)		UFC Fight Night 295 (Riyadh) – Mehemmedeli Osmanli		1–0	9–0
(Mexico)	Jessie Rosas	23	5 ft 7 in (1.70 m)	Tachidito	Loss – UFC Fight Night 288 (Glendale) – Sean King III		0–1	8–2
(United States)	Sean King III	23	5 ft 11 in (1.80 m)	The King of New Orleans	Win – UFC Fight Night 288 (Glendale) – Jessie Rosas		1–0	7–0
(United States)	Anthony Romero	30	5 ft 5 in (1.65 m)	The Bully	Loss – UFC 332 (Salt Lake City) – Marcus McGhee		0–1	7–3 (1 NC)
(United States)	Carlos Calderon	30	5 ft 9 in (1.75 m)	The Chief	Loss – UFC Fight Night 293 (Las Vegas) – Austin Bashi		0–1	11–5

=== Bantamweights (135 lb, 61 kg) ===
ISO	Name	Age	Ht.	Nickname	Result / next fight / status	Ref	Endeavor record	MMA record
(England)	Davey Grant	40	5 ft 8 in (1.73 m)	Dangerous	Loss – UFC Fight Night 293 (Las Vegas) – Elijah Smith		9–8	18–9
(United States)	Rob Font	39	5 ft 8 in (1.73 m)		Loss – UFC 326 (Las Vegas) – Raul Rosas Jr.		12–9	22–10
(Ecuador)	Marlon Vera	33	5 ft 8 in (1.73 m)	Chito	Win – UFC 331 (Los Angeles) – Charles Jourdain		16–11	24–12–1
(United States)	Cody Garbrandt	35	5 ft 7 in (1.70 m)	No Love	Loss – UFC 329 (Las Vegas) – Adrian Yañez		10–8	15–8
(Canada)	Aiemann Zahabi	39	5 ft 8 in (1.73 m)		Loss – UFC Freedom 250 (Washington) – Sean O'Malley		8–3	14–3
(Brazil)	Deiveson Figueiredo	38	5 ft 5 in (1.65 m)	Deus da Guerra	Loss – UFC 332 (Salt Lake City) – Payton Talbott		14–8–1	25–8–1
(China)	Song Yadong	28	5 ft 6 in (1.68 m)	Kung Fu Kid	Win – UFC Fight Night 286 (Shanghai) – Umar Nurmagomedov		13–4–1	24–9–1 (1 NC)
(United States)	Sean O'Malley	32	5 ft 11 in (1.80 m)	Sugar	Win – UFC Freedom 250 (Washington) – Aiemann Zahabi		12–3 (1 NC)	20–3 (1 NC)
(Georgia (country))	Merab Dvalishvili	35	5 ft 6 in (1.68 m)	The Machine	Loss – UFC 333 (Abu Dhabi) – Petr Yan		14–4	21–6
(United States)	Cory Sandhagen	34	5 ft 11 in (1.80 m)	The Sandman	Loss – UFC 329 (Las Vegas) – Mario Bautista		11–6	18–7
(United States)	Ricky Simón	34	5 ft 6 in (1.68 m)		Loss – UFC Fight Night 289 (Las Vegas) – Montel Jackson		10–7–1	22–8–1
(United States)	Bryce Mitchell	32	5 ft 10 in (1.78 m)	Thug Nasty	Win – UFC Fight Night 278 (Las Vegas) – Santiago Luna		10–3	19–3
(Brazil)	Raoni Barcelos	39	5 ft 7 in (1.70 m)		Loss – UFC Fight Night 289 (Las Vegas) – Raul Rosas Jr.		11–5	22–6
(Russia)	Petr Yan (c)	33	5 ft 7 in (1.70 m)	No Mercy	Win – UFC 333 (Abu Dhabi) – Merab Dvalishvili		13–4	21–5
(Russia)	Said Nurmagomedov	34	5 ft 8 in (1.73 m)		(February 5, 2026) – Visa issues – Out of UFC Fight Night 266 (Las Vegas) – Javid Basharat		7–4	18–5
(United States)	Montel Jackson	34	5 ft 10 in (1.78 m)	Quik	Win – UFC Fight Night 289 (Las Vegas) – Ricky Simón		10–4	16–4
(United States)	Chris Gutiérrez	35	5 ft 8 in (1.73 m)	El Guapo			10–4–1	22–7–2
(United States)	Mario Bautista	33	5 ft 9 in (1.75 m)		Win – UFC 329 (Las Vegas) – Cory Sandhagen		12–3	18–3
(Canada)	Charles Jourdain	30	5 ft 9 in (1.75 m)	Air	Loss – UFC 331 (Los Angeles) – Marlon Vera		9–8–1	18–9–1
(China)	Alateng Heili	34	5 ft 6 in (1.68 m)		Loss – UFC 334 (New York City) – Juan Díaz		6–4–1	18–11–2
(United States)	Kyler Phillips	31	5 ft 8 in (1.73 m)	The Matrix	UFC 335 (Las Vegas) – Ethyn Ewing		6–4	12–5
(United States)	John Castañeda	34	5 ft 7 in (1.70 m)	Sexi Mexi	Loss – UFC Fight Night 289 (Las Vegas) – Alateng Heili		4–5–1	21–9–1
(United States)	Adrian Yañez	32	5 ft 7 in (1.70 m)		(October 17, 2026) – Unknown reasons – Pulled out of UFC 334 (New York City) – Juan Díaz		7–3–1	18–6–1
(Russia)	Umar Nurmagomedov	30	5 ft 8 in (1.73 m)		Loss – UFC Fight Night 286 (Shanghai) – Song Yadong		8–2	20–2
(United States)	Brady Hiestand	27	5 ft 8 in (1.73 m)		Win – UFC Fight Night 289 (Las Vegas) – Rinya Nakamura		4–1	9–2
(Brazil)	Saimon Oliveira	35	5 ft 6 in (1.68 m)				0–4	18–7
(United States)	Victor Henry	39	5 ft 7 in (1.70 m)	La Mangosta	(May 28, 2026) – Undisclosed reasons – Out of UFC Fight Night 278 (Las Vegas) – Bryce Mitchell		4–2 (1 NC)	25–7 (1 NC)
(Canada)	Chad Anheliger	39	5 ft 6 in (1.68 m)	The Monster	Loss – UFC Fight Night 291 (Edmonton) – Steven Koslow		2–4	13–9
(United States)	Da'Mon Blackshear	32	5 ft 10 in (1.78 m)	Da Monster			5–4–1	17–8–1
(Mexico)	Cristian Quiñónez	30	5 ft 8 in (1.73 m)	Problema	Win – UFC Fight Night 268 (Mexico City) – Kris Moutinho		2–2	19–5
(South Africa)	Cameron Saaiman	25	5 ft 8 in (1.73 m)				3–3	9–3
(United States)	Steven Koslow	29	5 ft 7 in (1.70 m)	Obi Won Shinobi The Pillow	Win – UFC Fight Night 291 (Edmonton) – Chad Anheliger		1–1	7–1
(Mexico)	Raul Rosas Jr.	22	5 ft 9 in (1.75 m)	El Niño Problema	Win – UFC Fight Night 289 (Las Vegas) – Raoni Barcelos		7–1	13–1
(Japan)	Rinya Nakamura	31	5 ft 7 in (1.70 m)	Hybrid	Loss – UFC Fight Night 289 (Las Vegas) – Brady Hiestand		4–2	10–2
(Japan)	Toshiomi Kazama	29	5 ft 7 in (1.70 m)	Silent Finisher	UFC Fight Night 296 (Dallas) – John Garza		1–3	11–5
(Brazil)	Jafel Filho	33	5 ft 7 in (1.70 m)	Pastor	UFC Fight Night 295 (Riyadh) – Bruno Gustavo da Silva		3–3	17–5
(Tajikistan)	Muin Gafurov	30	5 ft 7 in (1.70 m)	Tajik	(July 7, 2026) – Leg injury – Out of UFC Fight Night 282 (Abu Dhabi) – Abdul Hussein		2–3	20–7
(Brazil)	Rafael Estevam	30	5 ft 8 in (1.73 m)	Macapá	Loss – UFC Fight Night 272 (Las Vegas) – Ethyn Ewing		3–1	14–1
(United States)	Payton Talbott	28	5 ft 10 in (1.78 m)		Win – UFC 332 (Salt Lake City) – Deiveson Figueiredo		6–1	12–1
(Canada)	Serhiy Sidey	30	5 ft 11 in (1.80 m)		UFC 336 (Toronto) – Louis Lee Scott		2–1	12–2
(United States)	Timothy Cuamba	27	5 ft 9 in (1.75 m)	Twilight Timmy	Win – UFC Fight Night 291 (Edmonton) – Louis Jourdain		3–3	11–4
(Ecuador)	Carlos Vera	39	5 ft 6 in (1.68 m)	Pequeno			1–1	12–4
(Albania)	Bernardo Sopaj	26	5 ft 6 in (1.68 m)	The Lion King	(September 30, 2026) – Injury – Out of UFC 332 (Salt Lake City) – Marcus McGhee		2–1	13–3
(United States)	Angel Pacheco	34	5 ft 8 in (1.73 m)		Loss – UFC Fight Night 268 (Mexico City) – Santiago Luna		0–2	7–4
(Brazil)	Jean Matsumoto	27	5 ft 6 in (1.68 m)		Win – UFC Fight Night 280 (Baku) – Bekzat Almakhan		4–2	18–2
(South Korea)	Lee Chang-ho	32	5 ft 8 in (1.73 m)				2–1	11–2
(China)	Xiao Long	28	5 ft 8 in (1.73 m)		Loss – UFC Fight Night 286 (Shanghai) – Francesco Nuzzi		1–4	27–12
(Australia)	Cody Haddon	28	5 ft 7 in (1.70 m)		Win – UFC Fight Night 277 (Macau) – Aori Qileng		2–0	9–1
(South Korea)	You Su-young	30	5 ft 6 in (1.68 m)	You-Jitsu	Win – UFC Fight Night 291 (Edmonton) – Cody Chovancek		4–1	17–4 (2 NC)
(Japan)	Kai Asakura	33	5 ft 8 in (1.73 m)		Win – UFC Fight Night 286 (Shanghai) – Aori Qileng		2–2	23–6
(Australia)	Colby Thicknesse	27	5 ft 7 in (1.70 m)	Slickness	Win – UFC 333 (Abu Dhabi) – Asaf Chopurov		3–1	10–1
(Georgia (country))	Aleksandre Topuria	30	5 ft 7 in (1.70 m)	El Conquistador	Loss – UFC Fight Night 294 (Al Rayyan) – Santiago Luna		2–1	7–2
(United States)	Elijah Smith	24	5 ft 9 in (1.75 m)	Swift	Win – UFC Fight Night 293 (Las Vegas) – Davey Grant		4–0	11–1
(Democratic Republic of the Congo)	Josias Musasa	28	5 ft 8 in (1.73 m)	The K.O. Wizard	(July 24, 2026) – Unknown reasons – Out of UFC Fight Night 283 (Belgrade) – Mark Vologdin		0–2	8–2
(Mexico)	David Martínez	28	5 ft 5 in (1.65 m)	Black Spartan	Win – UFC Fight Night 288 (Glendale) – Dan Ige		4–0	15–1
(United States)	Malcolm Wellmaker	32	5 ft 9 in (1.75 m)	The Machine	Loss – UFC Fight Night 290 (Las Vegas) – Otari Tanzilovi		2–3	10–3
(United States)	John Yannis	32	5 ft 7 in (1.70 m)	Angel	Loss – UFC Fight Night 278 (Las Vegas) – Marcus McGhee		1–2	10–5
(Mexico)	Santiago Luna	22	5 ft 9 in (1.75 m)	Border Boy	Win – UFC Fight Night 294 (Al Rayyan) – Aleksandre Topuria		3–1	9–1
(Poland)	Jakub Wikłacz	30	5 ft 9 in (1.75 m)	Masa	(May 2, 2026) – Injury – Out of UFC Fight Night 278 (Las Vegas) – Marcus McGhee		2–0	18–3–2
(United States)	Ethyn Ewing	28	5 ft 8 in (1.73 m)	The Professor Finesser	UFC 335 (Las Vegas) – Kyler Phillips		2–0	10–2
(New Zealand)	Lawrence Lui	30	5 ft 7 in (1.70 m)	Lok Yin / Lozza	Loss – UFC Fight Night 286 (Shanghai) – Hector Santiago		1–1	8–2
(Spain)	Hecher Sosa	31	5 ft 8 in (1.73 m)	Guanche Warrior	UFC Fight Night 295 (Riyadh) – Abdul Hussein		1–0	14–1
(Canada)	Jamie Siraj	32	5 ft 8 in (1.73 m)	The Gremlin	Loss – UFC Fight Night 273 (Winnipeg) – John Yannis		0–1	14–4
(Russia)	Mark Vologdin	26	5 ft 3 in (1.60 m)		Loss – UFC Fight Night 283 (Belgrade) – Borislav Nikolić		0–1–1	12–5–2
(Ecuador)	Adrián Luna Martinetti	31	5 ft 8 in (1.73 m)		Loss – UFC Fight Night 274 (Las Vegas) – Davey Grant		0–1	17–1
(Peru)	Juan Díaz	28	5 ft 8 in (1.73 m)	Pegajoso	Win – UFC 334 (New York City) – Alateng Heili		2–0	17–1–1
(Georgia (country))	Otari Tanzilovi	28	5 ft 10 in (1.78 m)		Win – UFC Fight Night 290 (Las Vegas) – Malcolm Wellmaker		1–1	11–2
(United States)	John Garza	24	5 ft 8 in (1.73 m)	Mowgli	UFC Fight Night 296 (Dallas) – Toshiomi Kazama		0–1	7–2
(Finland)	Abdul Hussein	29	5 ft 5 in (1.65 m)	Abba	UFC Fight Night 295 (Riyadh) – Hecher Sosa		1–0	16–2
(Serbia)	Borislav Nikolić	33	5 ft 9 in (1.75 m)	Zombee	Win – UFC Fight Night 283 (Belgrade) – Mark Vologdin		1–0	17–2
(Brazil)	Hector Santiago	33	5 ft 5 in (1.65 m)		Win – UFC Fight Night 286 (Shanghai) – Lawrence Lui		1–0	7–1
(Italy)	Francesco Nuzzi	30	5 ft 6 in (1.68 m)	Berserker	Win – UFC Fight Night 286 (Shanghai) – Xiao Long		1–0	12–2 (2 NC)
(Azerbaijan)	Mehemmedeli Osmanli	22	5 ft 9 in (1.75 m)	Ineffable	UFC Fight Night 295 (Riyadh) – Pavel Andrusca		0–1	11–2
(Kyrgyzstan)	Ilimbek Akylbek Uulu	23	5 ft 7 in (1.70 m)		Win – UFC Fight Night 289 (Las Vegas) – Mehemmedeli Osmanli		1–0	10–3
(Canada)	Cody Chovancek	28	5 ft 8 in (1.73 m)	The Best Fisherman in MMA	Loss – UFC Fight Night 291 (Edmonton) – You Su-young		0–1	9–1
(Canada)	Louis Jourdain	29	5 ft 9 in (1.75 m)	Mad Prince	Loss – UFC Fight Night 291 (Edmonton) – Timothy Cuamba		0–1	9–4
(Russia)	Asaf Chopurov	25	5 ft 7 in (1.70 m)	Honey Badger	Loss – UFC 333 (Abu Dhabi) – Colby Thicknesse		0–1	11–1

=== Flyweights (125 lb, 56 kg) ===
ISO	Name	Age	Ht.	Nickname	Result / next fight / status	Ref	Endeavor record	MMA record
(United States)	Tim Elliott	39	5 ft 7 in (1.70 m)		Win – UFC Fight Night 288 (Glendale) – Édgar Cháirez		11–12	21–15–1
(Japan)	Kyoji Horiguchi	33	5 ft 5 in (1.65 m)	Karate Kid	Win – UFC Fight Night 294 (Al Rayyan) – Asu Almabayev		10–2	37–6 (1 NC)
(Mexico)	Brandon Moreno	32	5 ft 7 in (1.70 m)	The Assassin Baby	UFC 335 (Las Vegas) – Charles Johnson		13–7–2	24–10–2
(Brazil)	Alexandre Pantoja	36	5 ft 5 in (1.65 m)	The Cannibal	Loss – UFC 331 (Los Angeles) – Joshua Van		14–5	30–7
(United States)	Joseph Morales	32	5 ft 6 in (1.68 m)	Bopo	Loss – UFC Fight Night 288 (Glendale) – Brandon Moreno		3–3	14–3
(United States)	Alex Perez	34	5 ft 4 in (1.63 m)		Loss – UFC Fight Night 286 (Shanghai) – Su Mudaerji		8–7 (1 NC)	26–11 (1 NC)
(China)	Su Mudaerji	30	5 ft 8 in (1.73 m)	The Tibetan Eagle	Win – UFC Fight Night 286 (Shanghai) – Alex Perez		7–4 (1 NC)	20–7 (1 NC)
(New Zealand)	Kai Kara-France	33	5 ft 5 in (1.65 m)	Don't Blink			8–5	25–12 (1 NC)
(Brazil)	Bruno Gustavo da Silva	36	5 ft 4 in (1.63 m)	Bulldog	UFC Fight Night 295 (Riyadh) – Jafel Filho		5–6 (1 NC)	15–9–2 (1 NC)
(Jamaica)	Ode' Osbourne	34	5 ft 7 in (1.70 m)	The Oddity	Loss – UFC Fight Night 292 (Las Vegas) – Cody Durden		5–8 (1 NC)	13–10 (2 NC)
(United States)	Brandon Royval	34	5 ft 7 in (1.70 m)	Raw Dawg	Win – UFC 329 (Las Vegas) – Lone'er Kavanagh		8–5	18–9
(Iraq)	Amir Albazi	33	5 ft 5 in (1.65 m)	The Prince	Win – UFC Fight Night 294 (Al Rayyan) – Alessandro Costa		6–2	18–3
(United States)	Cody Durden	35	5 ft 7 in (1.70 m)		Win – UFC Fight Night 292 (Las Vegas) – Ode' Osbourne		8–9–1	19–11–1
(Russia)	Tagir Ulanbekov	35	5 ft 6 in (1.68 m)	Gifted			6–2	17–3
(Angola)	Manel Kape	33	5 ft 5 in (1.65 m)	Starboy	UFC 336 (Toronto) – Joshua Van		8–3	23–7
(Japan)	Tatsuro Taira	26	5 ft 7 in (1.70 m)		Loss - UFC 328 (Newark) – Joshua Van		8–2	18–2
(United States)	Charles Johnson	35	5 ft 9 in (1.75 m)	InnerG	UFC 335 (Las Vegas) – Brandon Moreno		9–7	20–9
(Brazil)	Alessandro Costa	30	5 ft 4 in (1.63 m)	Nono	Loss – UFC Fight Night 294 (Al Rayyan) – Amir Albazi		5–4	17–6
(South Korea)	Park Hyun-sung	31	5 ft 7 in (1.70 m)	Peace of Mind			3–2	10–2
(United States)	Clayton Carpenter	30	5 ft 6 in (1.68 m)	Concrete	Loss - UFC 328 (Newark) – Jose Ochoa		2–3	8–3
(Australia)	Steve Erceg	31	5 ft 8 in (1.73 m)	Astro Boy	Loss – UFC Fight Night 282 (Abu Dhabi) – Ramazan Temirov		5–4	14–5
(Myanmar)	Joshua Van (c)	25	5 ft 5 in (1.65 m)	The Fearless	UFC 336 (Toronto) – Manel Kape		11–1	18–2
(Mexico)	Édgar Cháirez	30	5 ft 7 in (1.70 m)	Pitbull	Loss – UFC Fight Night 288 (Glendale) – Tim Elliott		4–3 (1 NC)	14–7
(Kazakhstan)	Asu Almabayev	32	5 ft 4 in (1.63 m)	Zulfikar	Loss – UFC Fight Night 294 (Al Rayyan) – Kyoji Horiguchi		7–2	24–4
(Peru)	Kevin Borjas	28	5 ft 5 in (1.65 m)	El Gallo Negro	Loss – UFC Fight Night 286 (Shanghai) – Rei Tsuruya		2–5	11–6
(Mexico)	Ronaldo Rodríguez	27	5 ft 6 in (1.68 m)	Lazy Boy			2–1	17–3
(Brazil)	André Lima	27	5 ft 7 in (1.70 m)	Mascote	Win – UFC Fight Night 286 (Shanghai) – Namsrai Batbayar		5–1	12–1
(United States)	Mitch Raposo	28	5 ft 5 in (1.65 m)		Win – UFC Fight Night 293 (Las Vegas) – Marcos Degli		3–2	12–2
(Japan)	Rei Tsuruya	24	5 ft 6 in (1.68 m)		Win – UFC Fight Night 286 (Shanghai) – Kevin Borjas		3–1	12–1
(Brazil)	Lucas Rocha	26	5 ft 4 in (1.63 m)	Fenomeno	(April 20, 2026) – Undisclosed reasons – Out of UFC Fight Night 274 (Las Vegas) – Jafel Filho		1–1	18–2
(Uzbekistan)	Ramazan Temirov	29	5 ft 5 in (1.65 m)	Temurlan	Loss – UFC 333 (Abu Dhabi) – Lone'er Kavanagh		3–1	18–3
(England)	Lone'er Kavanagh	27	5 ft 4 in (1.63 m)		Win – UFC 333 (Abu Dhabi) – Ramazan Temirov		4–2	11–2
(Peru)	José Ochoa	25	5 ft 4 in (1.63 m)	Kalzifer	(August 12, 2026) – Undisclosed reasons – Out of UFC 330 (Philadelphia) – Charles Johnson		2–2	9–2
(Mongolia)	Nyamjargal Tumendemberel	28	5 ft 7 in (1.70 m)	Art of Knockout	Win – UFC 326 (Las Vegas) – Cody Durden		2–1	10–1
(South Korea)	Choi Dong-hun	27	5 ft 6 in (1.68 m)		(March 24, 2026) – Injury – Out of UFC Fight Night 273 (Winnipeg) – André Lima		1–0	9–0
(United States)	Luis Gurule	33	5 ft 5 in (1.65 m)	Grim	Win – UFC 334 (New York City) – Bilal Hasan		2–4	12–4
(Kazakhstan)	Alibi Idiris	32	5 ft 6 in (1.68 m)		NC – UFC Fight Night 267 (Houston) – Ode' Osbourne (February 21, 2026) – Suspended for one year until February 21, 2027 after testing positive for hydrochlorothiazide		0–1 (1 NC)	10–1 (1 NC)
(United States)	Alden Coria	28	5 ft 8 in (1.73 m)	Cobra	UFC Fight Night 296 (Dallas) – Michael Aljarouj		3–1	13–4 (1 NC)
(Mexico)	Imanol Rodríguez	27	5 ft 4 in (1.63 m)	Himan	Win – UFC 332 (Salt Lake City) – Alden Coria		2–0	8–0
(Brazil)	Eduardo Henrique	30	5 ft 7 in (1.70 m)	Chapolin	Loss - UFC 330 (Philadelphia) – Charles Johnson		0–1	15–3
(Mongolia)	Namsrai Batbayar	25	5 ft 4 in (1.63 m)	Steppe Warrior	Loss – UFC Fight Night 286 (Shanghai) – André Lima		0–1	10–2
(Indonesia)	Bilal Hasan	25	5 ft 7 in (1.70 m)	The IndoNinja	Loss – UFC 334 (New York City) – Luis Gurule		1–1	10–1 (1 NC)
(Peru)	Nilson Rojas	27	5 ft 6 in (1.68 m)	El Rayo	UFC 335 (Las Vegas) – Roque Conceição Moreira Jr.		0–1	9–1
(France)	Michael Aljarouj	29	5 ft 5 in (1.65 m)	The Soldier	UFC Fight Night 296 (Dallas) – Alden Coria		0–1	13–4 (2 NC)
(Spain)	Fabià Sintes	32	5 ft 7 in (1.70 m)	El Potro Menorquin	Win – UFC Fight Night 287 (Paris) – Michael Aljarouj		1–0	12–3
(Brazil)	Marcos Degli	26	5 ft 6 in (1.68 m)	Tailandês	Loss – UFC Fight Night 293 (Las Vegas) – Mitch Raposo		0–1	15–4

=== Women's bantamweights (135 lb, 61 kg) ===
ISO	Name	Age	Ht.	Nickname	Result / next fight / status	Ref	Endeavor record	MMA record
(United States)	Miesha Tate *	40	5 ft 6 in (1.68 m)	Cupcake			7–7	20–10
(Brazil)	Amanda Nunes *	38	5 ft 8 in (1.73 m)	The Lioness	Loss – UFC 334 (New York City) – Kayla Harrison		16–3	23–6
(United States)	Julianna Peña	37	5 ft 7 in (1.70 m)	The Venezuelan Vixen			8–4	12–6
(Brazil)	Priscila Cachoeira	38	5 ft 7 in (1.70 m)	Zombie Girl	Loss – UFC Fight Night 293 (Las Vegas) – Nina Nikolija Milošević		5–10	13–10
(Russia)	Yana Santos	37	5 ft 6 in (1.68 m)	Foxy	Loss – UFC Fight Night 292 (Las Vegas) – Luana Santos		7–6	17–9 (1 NC)
(United States)	Macy Chiasson	35	5 ft 9 in (1.75 m)		Loss – UFC 334 (New York City) – Beatriz Mesquita		8–7	10–7
(Brazil)	Karol Rosa	31	5 ft 7 in (1.70 m)		Loss – UFC Fight Night 279 (Las Vegas) – Luana Santos		8–5	19–8
(Panama)	Joselyne Edwards	31	5 ft 6 in (1.68 m)	La Pantera	Win – UFC Fight Night 274 (Las Vegas) – Norma Dumont		9–4	18–6
(Brazil)	Josiane Nunes	32	5 ft 2 in (1.57 m)	Josi			3–3	10–4
(Argentina)	Ailín Pérez	32	5 ft 5 in (1.65 m)	Fiona	Win – UFC Fight Night 289 (Las Vegas) – Norma Dumont		7–1	14–2
(United States)	Chelsea Chandler	32	5 ft 8 in (1.73 m)		Win – UFC Fight Night 291 (Edmonton) – Melissa Croden		4–3	8–4
(Brazil)	Luana Santos	26	5 ft 6 in (1.68 m)		Win – UFC Fight Night 292 (Las Vegas) – Yana Santos		7–1	12–2
(Portugal)	Jacqueline Cavalcanti	29	5 ft 8 in (1.73 m)	The Nightmare	UFC Fight Night 294 (Al Rayyan) – Michelle Montague		5–1	10–2
(France)	Nora Cornolle	36	5 ft 7 in (1.70 m)		Win – UFC Fight Night 287 (Paris) – Klaudia Syguła		4–3	10–4
(England)	Melissa Mullins	35	5 ft 7 in (1.70 m)	No Mess	Loss – UFC Fight Night 279 (Las Vegas) – Beatriz Mesquita		2–3	7–3
(Russia)	Darya Zheleznyakova	30	5 ft 9 in (1.75 m)	Iron Lady	Loss – UFC Fight Night 290 (Las Vegas) – Alice Pereira		2–3	10–4
(United States)	Kayla Harrison (c)	36	5 ft 8 in (1.73 m)		Win – UFC 334 (New York City) – Amanda Nunes		4–0	20–1
(Poland)	Klaudia Syguła	27	5 ft 8 in (1.73 m)		Loss – UFC Fight Night 287 (Paris) – Nora Cornolle		2–2	8–3
(Brazil)	Alice Pereira	20	5 ft 10 in (1.78 m)	Golden Girl	Win – UFC Fight Night 290 (Las Vegas) – Darya Zheleznyakova		2–1	8–1
(New Zealand)	Michelle Montague	32	5 ft 9 in (1.75 m)	The Wild One	UFC 335 (Las Vegas) – Jacqueline Cavalcanti		2–0	8–0
(Brazil)	Beatriz Mesquita	35	5 ft 4 in (1.63 m)	The Lady GOAT	Win – UFC 334 (New York City) – Macy Chiasson		4–0	9–0
(Canada)	Melissa Croden	35	5 ft 10 in (1.78 m)	Scare	Loss – UFC Fight Night 291 (Edmonton) – Chelsea Chandler		2–2	8–4
(Serbia)	Nina Nikolija Milošević	31	5 ft 5 in (1.65 m)	Queen Beast	Win – UFC Fight Night 293 (Las Vegas) – Priscila Cachoeira		2–0	10–1

=== Women's flyweights (125 lb, 56 kg) ===
ISO	Name	Age	Ht.	Nickname	Result / next fight / status	Ref	Endeavor record	MMA record
(United States)	Rose Namajunas	34	5 ft 5 in (1.65 m)	Thug	Loss – UFC 324 (Las Vegas) – Natália Silva		12–7	14–8
(Kyrgyzstan)	Valentina Shevchenko	38	5 ft 5 in (1.65 m)	Bullet	(September 1, 2026) – Injury – Sidelined for over a year – Out of UFC 332 (Salt Lake City) – Natália Silva		15–3–1	26–5–1
(Venezuela)	Veronica Hardy	31	5 ft 4 in (1.63 m)		(July 7, 2026) – Suffered a cut in training – Out of UFC Fight Night 281 (Oklahoma City) – Dione Barbosa		5–5	10–5–1
(United States)	Katlyn Cerminara	37	5 ft 9 in (1.75 m)	Blonde Fighter	Win – UFC Fight Night 291 (Edmonton) – Mackenzie Stiller		12–6	19–6
(Mexico)	Alexa Grasso	33	5 ft 5 in (1.65 m)		Win – UFC Fight Night 288 (Glendale) – Manon Fiorot		10–5–1	18–5–1
(United States)	JJ Aldrich	34	5 ft 5 in (1.65 m)		Loss – UFC Fight Night 288 (Glendale) – Regina Tarin		11–7	15–8
(China)	Zhang Weili	37	5 ft 3 in (1.60 m)	Magnum			10–3	26–4
(United States)	Maycee Barber	28	5 ft 7 in (1.70 m)	The Future	(November 5, 2026) – Undisclosed reasons – Out of UFC 335 (Las Vegas) – Carli Judice		10–3	15–3
(United States)	Tracy Cortez	32	5 ft 5 in (1.65 m)		Loss – UFC 329 (Las Vegas) – Wang Cong		6–3	12–4
(United States)	Miranda Maverick	29	5 ft 3 in (1.60 m)	Fear The			8–4	15–6
(France)	Manon Fiorot	36	5 ft 7 in (1.70 m)	The Beast	Loss – UFC Fight Night 288 (Glendale) – Alexa Grasso		8–2	13–3
(Scotland)	Casey O'Neill	29	5 ft 6 in (1.68 m)	King	Win – UFC 331 (Los Angeles) – Eduarda Moura		7–2	13–2
(Brazil)	Melissa Gatto	30	5 ft 5 in (1.65 m)		Draw - UFC Fight Night 290 (Las Vegas) – Ernesta Kareckaitė		3–3–1	9–3–3
(United States)	Erin Blanchfield	27	5 ft 4 in (1.63 m)	Cold Blooded	Loss – UFC Fight Night 291 (Edmonton) – Jasmine Jasudavicius		8–2	14–3
(Canada)	Jasmine Jasudavicius	37	5 ft 7 in (1.70 m)		Win – UFC Fight Night 291 (Edmonton) – Erin Blanchfield		10–3	16–4
(Brazil)	Karine Silva	32	5 ft 5 in (1.65 m)	Killer	Win – UFC Fight Night 293 (Las Vegas) – Gabriella Fernandes		6–3	20–7
(Brazil)	Natália Silva (c)	29	5 ft 4 in (1.63 m)		Win – UFC 332 (Salt Lake City) – Wang Cong		9–0	21–5–1
(United States)	Juliana Miller	30	5 ft 7 in (1.70 m)	Killer	Win – UFC Fight Night 284 (Las Vegas) – Ravena Oliveira		3–3	5–4
(Czech Republic)	Tereza Bledá	24	5 ft 9 in (1.75 m)	Ronda			1–2	7–2
(Brazil)	Gabriella Fernandes	33	5 ft 6 in (1.68 m)	Gabi	Loss – UFC Fight Night 293 (Las Vegas) – Karine Silva		3–4	11–5
(Canada)	Jamey-Lyn Horth	36	5 ft 7 in (1.70 m)		(September 27, 2026) – Undisclosed injury – Out of UFC Fight Night 291 (Edmonton) – Katlyn Cerminara		4–3	10–3
(Brazil)	Tainara Lisboa	35	5 ft 6 in (1.68 m)	Thai Panther	Loss – UFC Fight Night 292 (Las Vegas) – Lucia Szabová		2–3	7–5
(Brazil)	Dione Barbosa	34	5 ft 6 in (1.68 m)	The Witch	Win – UFC Fight Night 281 (Oklahoma City) – Anna Melisano		4–2	10–4
(Lithuania)	Ernesta Kareckaitė	28	5 ft 9 in (1.75 m)	Heavy-Handed	Draw - UFC Fight Night 290 (Las Vegas) – Melissa Gatto		1–2–1	6–2–2
(Brazil)	Eduarda Moura	32	5 ft 6 in (1.68 m)	Ronda	Loss – UFC 331 (Los Angeles) – Casey O'Neill		3–3	12–3
(United States)	Carli Judice	27	5 ft 9 in (1.75 m)	Crispy	UFC 335 (Las Vegas) – TBD		4–1	7–2
(China)	Wang Cong	34	5 ft 6 in (1.68 m)	The Joker	Loss – UFC 332 (Salt Lake City) – Natália Silva		5–2	10–2
(Venezuela)	Yuneisy Duben	30	5 ft 4 in (1.63 m)		Loss – UFC Fight Night 278 (Las Vegas) – Jeisla Chaves		0–2	6–2 (1 NC)
(Mexico)	Regina Tarín	22	5 ft 7 in (1.70 m)	Kill Bill	Win – UFC Fight Night 288 (Glendale) – JJ Aldrich		2–0	9–0
(Brazil)	Jeisla Chaves	29	5 ft 6 in (1.68 m)	A Braba	Loss – UFC Fight Night 285 (Sacramento) – Carli Judice		1–1	8–1
(United States)	Anna Melisano	29	5 ft 6 in (1.68 m)	Bandana	Loss – UFC Fight Night 281 (Oklahoma City) – Dione Barbosa		0–1	6–2
(United States)	Mackenzie Stiller	27	5 ft 2 in (1.57 m)	Mack Judo	Loss – UFC Fight Night 291 (Edmonton) – Katlyn Cerminara		0–1	6–2
(Slovakia)	Lucia Szabová	28	5 ft 7 in (1.70 m)	Silent Killer	Win – UFC Fight Night 292 (Las Vegas) – Tainara Lisboa		1–0	11–0

=== Women's strawweights (115 lb, 52 kg) ===
ISO	Name	Age	Ht.	Nickname	Result / next fight / status	Ref	Endeavor record	MMA record
(Brazil)	Jéssica Andrade	35	5 ft 2 in (1.57 m)	Bate Estaca			17–13	26–15
(United States)	Angela Hill	41	5 ft 3 in (1.60 m)	Overkill	UFC 335 (Las Vegas) – Shanelle Dyer		14–16	19–16
(Poland)	Karolina Kowalkiewicz	41	5 ft 3 in (1.60 m)	Polish Princess	UFC Fight Night 296 (Dallas) – Sam Hughes		10–9	17–9
(United States)	Tatiana Suarez	35	5 ft 5 in (1.65 m)		Win – UFC Fight Night 293 (Las Vegas) – Virna Jandiroba		10–1	13–1
(Brazil)	Amanda Lemos	39	5 ft 4 in (1.63 m)	Amandinha	Loss – UFC Fight Night 284 (Las Vegas) – Alexia Thainara		9–7	15–7–1
(China)	Yan Xiaonan	37	5 ft 5 in (1.65 m)	Nine	Loss – UFC Fight Night 286 (Shanghai) – Denise Gomes		9–5	18–6 (1 NC)
(Canada)	Gillian Robertson	31	5 ft 5 in (1.65 m)	The Savage	Loss - UFC 330 (Philadelphia) – Mackenzie Dern		14–7	17–9
(Brazil)	Polyana Viana	34	5 ft 7 in (1.70 m)	Dama de Ferro	Loss – UFC Fight Night 276 (Las Vegas) – Alice Ardelean		4–8	13–9
(Brazil)	Mackenzie Dern (c)	33	5 ft 4 in (1.63 m)		Win - UFC 330 (Philadelphia) – Gillian Robertson		12–5	17–5
(Brazil)	Amanda Ribas	33	5 ft 4 in (1.63 m)		(June 17, 2026) – Dizziness – Out of UFC Fight Night 281 (Oklahoma City) – Fatima Kline		7–6	12–7
(Japan)	Mizuki Inoue	32	5 ft 4 in (1.63 m)				3–1	16–6
(Thailand)	Loma Lookboonmee	30	5 ft 1 in (1.55 m)		Loss – UFC Fight Night 277 (Macau) – Jaqueline Amorim		7–4	10–5
(United States)	Sam Hughes	34	5 ft 5 in (1.65 m)	Sampage	UFC Fight Night 296 (Dallas) – Karolina Kowalkiewicz		6–6	11–7
(Mexico)	Montserrat Ruiz	33	5 ft 0 in (1.52 m)	Conejo			1–4	10–5
(Mexico)	Loopy Godinez	33	5 ft 2 in (1.57 m)	Loopy	Win – UFC Fight Night 290 (Las Vegas) – Ketlen Souza		10–6	15–6
(Brazil)	Luana Pinheiro	33	5 ft 2 in (1.57 m)				3–4	11–5
(Brazil)	Tabatha Ricci	31	5 ft 1 in (1.55 m)	Baby Shark	Loss – UFC Fight Night 281 (Oklahoma City) – Fatima Kline		7–5	12–5
(United States)	Elise Reed	33	5 ft 3 in (1.60 m)		Loss – UFC Fight Night 285 (Sacramento) – Shanelle Dyer		4–6	8–6
(United States)	Vanessa Demopoulos	38	5 ft 2 in (1.57 m)	Lil Monster	Loss – UFC Fight Night 289 (Las Vegas) – Yazmin Jauregui		5–6	11–9
(Venezuela)	Piera Rodríguez	34	5 ft 3 in (1.60 m)	La Fiera	Win – UFC Fight Night 292 (Las Vegas) – Talita Alencar		6–2	13–2
(Mexico)	Yazmin Jauregui	27	5 ft 3 in (1.60 m)		Win – UFC Fight Night 289 (Las Vegas) – Vanessa Demopoulos		4–2	12–2
(Brazil)	Iasmin Lucindo	24	5 ft 3 in (1.60 m)		Win – UFC 333 (Abu Dhabi) – Nicolle Caliari		6–2	19–6
(Brazil)	Denise Gomes	26	5 ft 5 in (1.65 m)		Win – UFC Fight Night 286 (Shanghai) – Yan Xiaonan		7–2	13–3
(Brazil)	Jaqueline Amorim	31	5 ft 3 in (1.60 m)	Jacque	(August 17, 2026) – Tested positive for Ostarine – Suspended for 6 months until February 17, 2027		5–2	11–2
(Brazil)	Ketlen Souza	31	5 ft 3 in (1.60 m)	Esquentadinha	Loss – UFC Fight Night 290 (Las Vegas) – Loopy Godínez		4–4	17–7
(Republic of Ireland)	Shauna Bannon	33	5 ft 5 in (1.65 m)	Mama B	Loss – UFC Fight Night 276 (Las Vegas) – Nicolle Caliari		2–3	7–3
(Brazil)	Talita Alencar	36	5 ft 1 in (1.55 m)	The Problem Child	Loss – UFC Fight Night 292 (Las Vegas) – Piera Rodríguez		4–2	8–2–1
(Brazil)	Rayanne dos Santos	31	5 ft 2 in (1.57 m)				0–3	14–8
(India)	Puja Tomar	32	5 ft 4 in (1.63 m)	The Cyclone	Loss – Road to UFC Season 5 (Macau) – Shi Ming		1–2	9–6
(Brazil)	Julia Polastri	28	5 ft 2 in (1.57 m)	The Dragon	Win – UFC Fight Night 286 (Shanghai) – Xiong Jingnan		3–3	15–5
(United States)	Fatima Kline	26	5 ft 6 in (1.68 m)	The Archangel	Win – UFC Fight Night 281 (Oklahoma City) – Tabatha Ricci		4–1	10–1
(Brazil)	Nicolle Caliari	30	5 ft 3 in (1.60 m)		Loss – UFC 333 (Abu Dhabi) – Iasmin Lucindo		1–3	9–5
(Romania)	Alice Ardelean	34	5 ft 3 in (1.60 m)		Win – UFC Fight Night 276 (Las Vegas) – Polyana Viana		3–2	12–7
(Brazil)	Stephanie Luciano	26	5 ft 6 in (1.68 m)	Rondinha	Win – UFC Fight Night 283 (Belgrade) – Marina Spasić		3–1	8–2–1
(China)	Shi Ming	32	5 ft 3 in (1.60 m)	Bunny Bomb	Win – Road to UFC Season 5 (Macau) – Puja Tomar		2–1	18–6
(Brazil)	Alexia Thainara	29	5 ft 4 in (1.63 m)	Burguesinha	Win – UFC Fight Night 284 (Las Vegas) – Amanda Lemos		4–0	15–1
(England)	Shanelle Dyer	25	5 ft 6 in (1.68 m)	The Nightmare	UFC 335 (Las Vegas) – Angela Hill		2–0	8–1
(China)	Xiong Jingnan	38	5 ft 5 in (1.65 m)	The Panda	Loss – UFC Fight Night 286 (Shanghai) – Julia Polastri		0–2	19–4
(Serbia)	Marina Spasić	32	5 ft 4 in (1.63 m)		Loss – UFC Fight Night 283 (Belgrade) – Stephanie Luciano		0–1	7–2
(Brazil)	Giovanna Canuto	24	5 ft 2 in (1.57 m)	GiGi / Diamond	Loss – UFC Fight Night 284 (Las Vegas) – Carol Foro		0–1	7–2
(Brazil)	Carol Foro	29	5 ft 2 in (1.57 m)	Anabelle	Win – UFC Fight Night 284 (Las Vegas) – Giovanna Canuto		1–0	10–1
(France)	Delphine Benouaich	31	5 ft 3 in (1.60 m)		Win – UFC Fight Night 287 (Paris) – Sofia Montenegro		1–0	8–2
(Argentina)	Sofia Montenegro	27	5 ft 6 in (1.68 m)	La Bruja	Loss – UFC Fight Night 287 (Paris) – Delphine Benouaich		0–1	6–3
(United States)	Melissa Amaya	31	5 ft 4 in (1.63 m)	Mamba	Loss – UFC Fight Night 289 (Las Vegas) – Valesca Machado		0–1	8–1
(Brazil)	Valesca Machado	30	5 ft 4 in (1.63 m)	Tina Black	Win – UFC Fight Night 289 (Las Vegas) – Melissa Amaya		1–0	16–4 (1 NC)

== See also ==
- List of UFC champions
- List of UFC events
- List of current ACA fighters
- List of current Brave CF fighters
- List of Dana White's Contender Series alumni
- List of current Invicta FC fighters
- List of current KSW fighters
- List of current Oktagon MMA fighters
- List of current ONE fighters
- List of current PFL fighters
- List of current Rizin FF fighters
- List of current Road FC fighters
