= UFC Fight Night: Adesanya vs. Magomedov =

2026 mixed martial event in Saudi Arabia

- The poster for UFC Fight Night: Adesanya vs. Magomedov
- Promotion: Ultimate Fighting Championship
- Date: December 5, 2026
- Venue: anb Arena
- City: Riyadh, Saudi Arabia

Event chronology
UFC Fight Night: Procházka vs. Stirling	UFC Fight Night: Adesanya vs. Magomedov	UFC 335: Oliveira vs. Lopes

UFC Fight Night: Adesanya vs. Magomedov (also known as UFC Fight Night 295) is an upcoming mixed martial arts event produced by the Ultimate Fighting Championship that is scheduled to take place on December 5, 2026, at the anb Arena in Riyadh, Saudi Arabia.

== Background ==
The event will mark the promotion's third visit to Riyadh and first since UFC Fight Night: Adesanya vs. Imavov in February 2025. The event was initially reported for November 28 before being moved to December 5 for undisclosed reasons.

Despite concerns regarding the realization of this event due to the Houthi attacks on Saudi airports, less than eight weeks before the event is scheduled to take place, UFC CEO Dana White assured the event will continue as scheduled.

A middleweight bout between former two-time UFC Middleweight Champion Israel Adesanya and Sharabutdin Magomedov is scheduled to headline the event.

A five-round welterweight bout between former UFC Welterweight Championship challenger Ian Machado Garry and former Bellator Welterweight World Champion Yaroslav Amosov is scheduled to serve as the co-main event. They were originally scheduled to compete at UFC 335 one week later, but the bout was moved to this event for undisclosed reasons.

A featherweight bout between former LFA Featherweight Champion Gabriel Santos and undefeated prospect Luke Riley is scheduled for the event. The bout was originally scheduled for UFC 335 one week later, but was moved to this event for undisclosed reasons.

== Fight card ==
Main card (Paramount+)
Weight class				Method	Round	Time	Notes
Middleweight	Israel Adesanya	vs.	Sharabutdin Magomedov
Welterweight	Ian Machado Garry	vs.	Yaroslav Amosov
Heavyweight	Serghei Spivac	vs.	Mário Pinto
Welterweight	Levan Chokheli	vs.	Islam Dulatov
Lightweight	Mairon Santos	vs.	Akbar Abdullaev
Light Heavyweight	Magomed Tuchalov	vs.	Ion Cuțelaba
Preliminary card (Paramount+)
Flyweight	Bruno Gustavo da Silva	vs.	Jafel Filho
Light Heavyweight	Uran Satybaldiev	vs.	Ivan Gnizditskiy
Middleweight	Marco Tulio	vs.	Park Jun-yong
Bantamweight	Pavel Andrusca	vs.	Mehemmedeli Osmanli
Middleweight	Modestino Rodrigues	vs.	Matthieu Letho Duclos
Bantamweight	Abdul Hussein	vs.	Hecher Sosa

== Announced bouts ==
- Lightweight bout: Mateusz Rębecki vs. Elves Brener
- Featherweight bout: Luke Riley vs. Gabriel Santos

== See also ==
- 2026 in UFC
- List of current UFC fighters
- List of UFC events
- Riyadh Season
