= UFC rankings =

Athletic rankings

Ultimate Fighting Championship (UFC) rankings, which were introduced in February 2013, are generated by a voting panel made up of media members. These media members are asked to vote for whom they feel are the top fighters in the UFC by weight class and pound-for-pound. A fighter is only eligible to be voted on if they are of active status in the UFC. A fighter can appear in more than one weight division at a time. The champion and interim champion are considered to be in top positions of their respective divisions and therefore are not eligible for voting by weight class. However, the champions can be voted on for the pound-for-pound rankings.

On June 20, 2026, the promotion began replacing that system with the Meta UFC Rankings, an Elo‑based mathematical model built in partnership with Meta, Inc. It's designed to prioritize objectivity through factors such as opponent quality, activity, and decay for long layoffs or outdated wins. The new framework removes pound‑for‑pound rankings and minimizes human involvement, with the media panel continuing only during a transition period.

== Legend ==
Legend
▲ +1	Move up
Steady	No change
▼ −1	Move down
New entry	Not previously ranked

== Men's Meta rankings ==
=== Heavyweight ===
Weight limit: 206 to 265 lb • 93.44 kg to 120.20 kg
Rankings released on November 14, 2026, after UFC 334.

Rank	ISO	Fighter	Record	M	Win streak	Last fight				Next fight		
Rank	ISO	Fighter	Record	M	Win streak	Result	Event	Opponent	Ref.	Event	Opponent	Ref.
C	(France)	Ciryl Gane	15–2 (1 NC)	Steady	2 (1 def)	Win	UFC 334	Josh Hokit		TBD		
1	(England)	Tom Aspinall	15–3 (1 NC)	Steady	0	NC	UFC 321	Ciryl Gane		(March 7, 2026) – Eye surgery		
2	(Russia)	Alexander Volkov	41–11	Steady	3	Win	UFC 333	Rizvan Kuniev		TBD		
3	(Brazil)	Alex Pereira	13–4	Steady	0	Loss	UFC Freedom 250	Ciryl Gane		UFC 335	Sergei Pavlovich	
4	(Russia)	Sergei Pavlovich	21–3	Steady	3	Win	UFC Fight Night 277	Tallison Teixeira		UFC 335	Alex Pereira	
5	(United States)	Josh Hokit	10–1	Steady	0	Loss	UFC 334	Ciryl Gane		TBD		
6	(Russia)	Rizvan Kuniev	14–4–1 (1 NC)	Steady	0	Loss	UFC 333	Alexander Volkov		TBD		
7	(United States)	Curtis Blaydes	20–6 (1 NC)	Steady	1	Win	UFC Fight Night 288	Waldo Cortes-Acosta		TBD		
8	(Brazil)	Johnny Walker	24–10 (1 NC)	Steady	2	Win	UFC Fight Night 293	Waldo Cortes-Acosta		TBD		
9	(Brazil)	Vitor Petrino	15–2	Steady	4	Win	UFC Fight Night 285	Serghei Spivac		TBD		
10	(Portugal)	Mario Pinto	13–0	Steady	13	Win	UFC Fight Night 287	Ryan Spann		UFC Fight Night 295	Serghei Spivac	
11	(Brazil)	Valter Walker	16–1	Steady	5	Win	UFC Fight Night 282	Thomas Petersen		TBD		
12	(Dominican Republic)	Waldo Cortes-Acosta	17–5	Steady	0	Loss	UFC Fight Night 293	Johnny Walker		TBD		
13	(Australia)	Brando Peričić	7–1	Steady	5	Win	UFC Fight Night 275	Shamil Gaziev		TBD		
14	(Moldova)	Serghei Spivac	18–7	Steady	0	Loss	UFC Fight Night 285	Vitor Petrino		UFC Fight Night 295	Mario Pinto	
15	(United States)	Anthony Wint	9–0	Steady	9	Win	UFC 332	Lucas Armand		TBD		

=== Light Heavyweight ===
Weight limit: 186 to 205 lbs • 84.36 to 92.98 kg
Rankings released on November 14, 2026, after UFC 334.

Rank	ISO	Fighter	Record	M	Win streak	Last fight				Next fight		
Rank	ISO	Fighter	Record	M	Win streak	Result	Event	Opponent	Ref.	Event	Opponent	Ref.
C	(New Zealand)	Carlos Ulberg	14–1	Steady	10 (0 def)	Win	UFC 327	Jiří Procházka		(April 18, 2026) – Torn ACL		
1	(Brazil)	Alex Pereira	13–4	Steady	0	Loss	UFC Freedom 250	Ciryl Gane		UFC 335	Sergei Pavlovich	
2	(Russia)	Magomed Ankalaev	21–2–1 (1 NC)	Steady	1	Win	UFC Fight Night 282	Bogdan Guskov		TBD		
3	(Czech Republic)	Jiří Procházka	32–7–1	Steady	0	Loss	UFC Fight Night 294	Navajo Stirling		TBD		
4	(United States)	Dominick Reyes	17–5	Steady	2	Win	UFC 333	Azamat Murzakanov		TBD		
5	(Brazil)	Paulo Costa	16–4	Steady	2	Win	UFC 327	Azamat Murzakanov		TBD		
6	(United States)	Khalil Rountree Jr.	14–7 (1 NC)	Steady	0	Loss	UFC 320	Jiří Procházka		(July 13, 2026) – Undisclosed injury		
7	(New Zealand)	Navajo Stirling	12–0	Steady	12	Win	UFC Fight Night 294	Jiří Procházka		TBD		
8	(Netherlands)	Reinier de Ridder	22–4	Steady	1	Win	UFC Fight Night 285	Roman Dolidze		TBD		
9	(United States)	Alonzo Menifield	19–6–1	Steady	2	Win	UFC 331	Iwo Baraniewski		TBD		
10	(Uzbekistan)	Bogdan Guskov	18–4–1	Steady	0	Loss	UFC Fight Night 282	Magomed Ankalaev		UFC Fight Night 298	Robert Whittaker	
11	(Australia)	Robert Whittaker	27–9	Steady	1	Win	UFC 329	Nikita Krylov		UFC Fight Night 298	Bogdan Guskov	
12	(Russia)	Muhammad Saidov	10–0	Steady	10	Win	UFC Fight Night 282	Dustin Jacoby		TBD		
13	(Turkey)	Abdul-Rakhman Yakhyaev	11–0	Steady	11	Win	UFC 333	Nikita Krylov		TBD		
14	(Russia)	Azamat Murzakanov	16–2	Steady	0	Loss	UFC 333	Dominick Reyes		TBD		
15	(Lithuania)	Modestas Bukauskas	21–7	Steady	2	Win	UFC Fight Night 287	Oumar Sy		TBD		

=== Middleweight ===
Weight limit: 171 to 185 lb • 77.56 to 83.91 kg
Rankings released on November 14, 2026, after UFC 334.

Rank	ISO	Fighter	Record	M	Win streak	Last fight				Next fight		
Rank	ISO	Fighter	Record	M	Win streak	Result	Event	Opponent	Ref.	Event	Opponent	Ref.
C	(United States)	Sean Strickland	31–7	Steady	2 (0 def)	Win	UFC 328	Khamzat Chimaev		TBD		
1	(United Arab Emirates)	Khamzat Chimaev	15–1	Steady	0	Loss	UFC 328	Sean Strickland		TBD		
2	(South Africa)	Dricus du Plessis	24–3	Steady	1	Win	UFC Fight Night 281	Kamaru Usman		TBD		
3	(France)	Nassourdine Imavov	17–4 (1 NC)	Steady	5	Win	UFC Fight Night 258	Caio Borralho		TBD		
4	(United States)	Brendan Allen	28–7	Steady	4	Win	UFC Fight Night 290	Christian Leroy Duncan		TBD		
5	(Brazil)	Caio Borralho	19–2 (1 NC)	▲ +1	2	Win	UFC 334	Yousri Belgaroui		TBD		
6	(United States)	Joe Pyfer	16–3	▼ −1	4	Win	UFC Fight Night 271	Israel Adesanya		UFC Fight Night 299	Bo Nickal	
7	(Brazil)	Gregory Rodrigues	20–6	Steady	4	Win	UFC Fight Night 285	Anthony Hernandez		TBD		
8	(United States)	Anthony Hernandez	15–4 (1 NC)	Steady	0	Loss	UFC Fight Night 285	Gregory Rodrigues		TBD		
9	(Germany)	Abusupiyan Magomedov	30–7–1	Steady	2	Win	UFC 333	Cameron Rowston		TBD		
10	(Nigeria)	Israel Adesanya	24–6	Steady	0	Loss	UFC Fight Night 271	Joe Pyfer		UFC Fight Night 295	Sharabutdin Magomedov	
11	(Russia)	Ikram Aliskerov	19–2	Steady	4	Win	UFC Fight Night 294	Jared Cannonier		TBD		
12	(England)	Christian Leroy Duncan	15–3	Steady	0	Loss	UFC Fight Night 290	Brendan Allen		TBD		
13	(United States)	Bo Nickal	9–1	Steady	2	Win	UFC Freedom 250	Kyle Daukaus		UFC Fight Night 299	Joe Pyfer	
14	(Russia)	Roman Kopylov	16–5	Steady	2	Win	UFC 332	Ateba Gautier		TBD		
15	(United States)	Edmen Shahbazyan	17–6	Steady	1	Win	UFC Fight Night 280	Brunno Ferreira		TBD		

=== Welterweight ===
Weight limit: 156 to 170 lb • 70.76 to 77.11 kg
Rankings released on November 14, 2026, after UFC 334.

Rank	ISO	Fighter	Record	M	Win streak	Last fight				Next fight		
Rank	ISO	Fighter	Record	M	Win streak	Result	Event	Opponent	Ref.	Event	Opponent	Ref.
C	(Russia)	Islam Makhachev	29–1	Steady	17 (1 def)	Win	UFC 330	Ian Machado Garry		TBD		
1	(Brazil)	Carlos Prates	24–7	Steady	3	Win	UFC Fight Night 275	Jack Della Maddalena		UFC 336	Michael Morales	
2	(Republic of Ireland)	Ian Machado Garry	17–2	Steady	0	Loss	UFC 330	Islam Makhachev		UFC Fight Night 295	Yaroslav Amosov	
3	(Ecuador)	Michael Morales	19–0	Steady	19	Win	UFC 322	Sean Brady		UFC 336	Carlos Prates	
4	(Australia)	Jack Della Maddalena	18–4	Steady	0	Loss	UFC Fight Night 275	Carlos Prates		TBD		
5	(United States)	Sean Brady	19–2	Steady	1	Win	UFC 328	Joaquin Buckley		UFC Fight Night 297	Gabriel Bonfim	
6	(Brazil)	Gabriel Bonfim	20–1	Steady	5	Win	UFC Fight Night 278	Belal Muhammad		UFC Fight Night 297	Sean Brady	
7	(United States)	Belal Muhammad	24–6 (1 NC)	Steady	0	Loss	UFC Fight Night 278	Gabriel Bonfim		TBD		
8	(Canada)	Mike Malott	15–2–1	Steady	5	Win	UFC Fight Night 291	Joaquin Buckley		TBD		
9	(United States)	Kevin Holland	29–15–1 (1 NC)	▲ +6	0	Draw	UFC 334	Uroš Medić		TBD		
10	(Serbia)	Uroš Medić	14–3–1	▼ −1	0	Draw	UFC 334	Kevin Holland		TBD		
11	(England)	Leon Edwards	22–6 (1 NC)	▼ −1	0	Loss	UFC 322	Carlos Prates		TBD		
12	(Nigeria)	Kamaru Usman	21–5	▼ −1	0	Loss	UFC Fight Night 281	Dricus du Plessis		TBD		
13	(United States)	Joaquin Buckley	21–9	▼ −1	0	Loss	UFC Fight Night 291	Mike Malott		TBD		
14	(Ukraine)	Yaroslav Amosov	30–1	▼ −1	3	Win	UFC 328	Joel Álvarez		UFC Fight Night 295	Ian Machado Garry	
15	(United States)	Jacobe Smith	14–0	▼ −1	14	Win	UFC Fight Night 292	Randy Brown		TBD		

=== Lightweight ===
Weight limit: 146 to 155 lb • 66.22 to 70.30 kg
Rankings released on November 14, 2026, after UFC 334.

Rank	ISO	Fighter	Record	M	Win streak	Last fight				Next fight		
Rank	ISO	Fighter	Record	M	Win streak	Result	Event	Opponent	Ref.	Event	Opponent	Ref.
C	(United States)	Justin Gaethje	28–5	Steady	3 (0 def)	Win	UFC Freedom 250	Ilia Topuria		TBD		
1	(Georgia (country))	Ilia Topuria	17–1	Steady	0	Loss	UFC Freedom 250	Justin Gaethje		(June 14, 2026) – Broken orbital		
2	(Armenia)	Arman Tsarukyan	24–3	Steady	6	Win	UFC 331	Maurício Ruffy		TBD		
3	(Brazil)	Charles Oliveira	37–11 (1 NC)	Steady	2	Win	UFC 326	Max Holloway		UFC 335	Diego Lopes	
4	(United States)	Max Holloway	28–9	Steady	1	Win	UFC 329	Conor McGregor		TBD		
5	(England)	Paddy Pimblett	24–4	Steady	1	Win	UFC 329	Benoît Saint Denis		TBD		
6	(Australia)	Quillan Salkilld	13–1	Steady	13	Win	UFC Fight Night 284	Mateusz Gamrot		UFC Fight Night 298	Benoît Saint Denis	
7	(Australia)	Tom Nolan	12–1	Steady	6	Win	UFC Fight Night 292	Renato Moicano		TBD		
8	(France)	Benoît Saint Denis	17–4 (1 NC)	Steady	0	Loss	UFC 329	Paddy Pimblett		UFC Fight Night 298	Quillan Salkilld	
9	(Poland)	Mateusz Gamrot	26–5 (1 NC)	Steady	0	Loss	UFC Fight Night 284	Quillan Salkilld		TBD		
10	(Brazil)	Maurício Ruffy	14–3	Steady	0	Loss	UFC 331	Arman Tsarukyan		TBD		
11	(United States)	Grant Dawson	25–3–1	Steady	2	Win	UFC 333	Nurullo Aliev		TBD		
12	(Azerbaijan)	Tofiq Musayev	24–6	Steady	2	Win	UFC Fight Night 283	Ľudovít Klein		TBD		
13	(Azerbaijan)	Rafael Fiziev	14–5	Steady	1	Win	UFC Fight Night 280	Manuel Torres		TBD		
14	(Brazil)	Renato Moicano	21–8–1	Steady	0	Loss	UFC Fight Night 292	Tom Nolan		TBD		
15	(Argentina)	Esteban Ribovics	17–3	Steady	2	Win	UFC 332	King Green		TBD		

=== Featherweight ===
Weight limit: 136 to 145 lb • 61.68 to 65.77 kg
Rankings released on November 14, 2026, after UFC 334.

Rank	ISO	Fighter	Record	M	Win streak	Last fight				Next fight		
Rank	ISO	Fighter	Record	M	Win streak	Result	Event	Opponent	Ref.	Event	Opponent	Ref.
C	(Australia)	Alexander Volkanovski	29–4	Steady	3 (2 def)	Win	UFC 333	Movsar Evloev		TBD		
1	(Russia)	Movsar Evloev	20–1	Steady	0	Loss	UFC 333	Alexander Volkanovski		TBD		
2	(Brazil)	Diego Lopes	28–8	Steady	1	Win	UFC Freedom 250	Steve Garcia		UFC 335	Charles Oliveira	
3	(England)	Lerone Murphy	17–1–1	Steady	0	Loss	UFC Fight Night 270	Movsar Evloev		TBD		
4	(United States)	Aljamain Sterling	26–6	Steady	0	Loss	UFC Fight Night 294	Kevin Vallejos		TBD		
5	(Brazil)	Jean Silva	18–3	Steady	2	Win	UFC Fight Night 288	Jose Delgado		TBD		
6	(England)	Arnold Allen	21–4	Steady	1	Win	UFC Fight Night 276	Melquizael Costa		(September 18, 2026) – Undisclosed injury		
7	(United States)	Pat Sabatini	22–5	Steady	4	Win	UFC 328	William Gomis		UFC Fight Night 297	Vinicius Oliveira	
8	(Morocco)	Youssef Zalal	18–6–1	Steady	0	Loss	UFC Fight Night 274	Aljamain Sterling		TBD		
9	(United States)	Aaron Pico	15–5	Steady	2	Win	UFC 333	Losene Keita		TBD		
10	(Argentina)	Kevin Vallejos	19–1	Steady	8	Win	UFC Fight Night 294	Aljamain Sterling		TBD		
11	(Brazil)	Joanderson Brito	20–5–1	▲ +1	3	Win	UFC 331	Giga Chikadze		UFC Fight Night 298	Kaan Ofli	
12	(United States)	Steve Garcia	19–6	▲ +1	0	Loss	UFC Freedom 250	Diego Lopes		UFC Fight Night 296	Yair Rodríguez	
13	(United States)	Jamall Emmers	23–8	▲ +1	3	Win	UFC Fight Night 285	Lerryan Douglas		TBD		
14	(Brazil)	Patrício Pitbull	38–9	▲ +1	1	Win	UFC 331	Choi Doo-ho		TBD		
15	(England)	Nathaniel Wood	23–7	New entry	0	Loss	UFC Fight Night 287	Pavel Andrusca		TBD		

=== Bantamweight ===
Weight limit: 126 to 135 lbs • 57.15 to 61.23 kg
Rankings released on November 14, 2026, after UFC 334.

Rank	ISO	Fighter	Record	M	Win streak	Last fight				Next fight		
Rank	ISO	Fighter	Record	M	Win streak	Result	Event	Opponent	Ref.	Event	Opponent	Ref.
C	(Russia)	Petr Yan	21–5	Steady	5 (1 def)	Win	UFC 333	Merab Dvalishvili		TBD		
1	(Georgia (country))	Merab Dvalishvili	21–6	Steady	0	Loss	UFC 333	Petr Yan		TBD		
2	(China)	Song Yadong	24–9–1 (1 NC)	Steady	2	Win	UFC Fight Night 286	Umar Nurmagomedov		TBD		
3	(United States)	Sean O'Malley	20–3 (1 NC)	Steady	2	Win	UFC Freedom 250	Aiemann Zahabi		TBD		
4	(United States)	Mario Bautista	18–3	Steady	2	Win	UFC 329	Cory Sandhagen		TBD		
5	(Russia)	Umar Nurmagomedov	20–2	Steady	0	Loss	UFC Fight Night 286	Song Yadong		TBD		
6	(United States)	Cory Sandhagen	18–7	Steady	0	Loss	UFC 329	Mario Bautista		TBD		
7	(Mexico)	David Martínez	15–1	Steady	11	Win	UFC Fight Night 288	Dan Ige		TBD		
8	(Mexico)	Raul Rosas Jr.	13–1	Steady	6	Win	UFC Fight Night 289	Raoni Barcelos		TBD		
9	(United States)	Marcus McGhee	12–2	Steady	2	Win	UFC 332	Anthony Romero		TBD		
10	(United States)	Payton Talbott	12–1	Steady	3	Win	UFC 332	Deiveson Figueiredo		TBD		
11	(United States)	Montel Jackson	16–4	Steady	1	Win	UFC Fight Night 289	Ricky Simón		TBD		
12	(Canada)	Aiemann Zahabi	14–3	Steady	0	Loss	UFC Freedom 250	Sean O'Malley		TBD		
13	(United States)	Bryce Mitchell	19–3	Steady	2	Win	UFC Fight Night 278	Santiago Luna		TBD		
14	(Ecuador)	Marlon Vera	24–12–1	Steady	1	Win	UFC 331	Charles Jourdain		TBD		
15	(Brazil)	Raoni Barcelos	22–6	Steady	0	Loss	UFC Fight Night 289	Raul Rosas Jr.		TBD		

=== Flyweight ===
Weight limit: 116 to 125 lb • 52.61 to 56.69 kg
Rankings released on November 14, 2026, after UFC 334.

Rank	ISO	Fighter	Record	M	Win streak	Last fight				Next fight		
Rank	ISO	Fighter	Record	M	Win streak	Result	Event	Opponent	Ref.	Event	Opponent	Ref.
C	(Myanmar)	Joshua Van	18–2	Steady	8 (2 def)	Win	UFC 331	Alexandre Pantoja		UFC 336	Manel Kape	
1	(Portugal)	Manel Kape	23–7	Steady	4	Win	UFC Fight Night 279	Kyoji Horiguchi		UFC 336	Joshua Van	
2	(Brazil)	Alexandre Pantoja	30–7	Steady	0	Loss	UFC 331	Joshua Van		TBD		
3	(United States)	Brandon Royval	18–9	Steady	1	Win	UFC 329	Lone'er Kavanagh		TBD		
4	(Japan)	Tatsuro Taira	18–2	Steady	0	Loss	UFC 328	Joshua Van		TBD		
5	(England)	Lone'er Kavanagh	11–2	Steady	1	Win	UFC 333	Ramazan Temirov		TBD		
6	(Kazakhstan)	Asu Almabayev	24–4	Steady	0	Loss	UFC Fight Night 294	Kyoji Horiguchi		TBD		
7	(Japan)	Kyoji Horiguchi	37–6 (1 NC)	Steady	1	Win	UFC Fight Night 294	Asu Almabayev		TBD		
8	(Iraq)	Amir Albazi	18–3	Steady	1	Win	UFC Fight Night 294	Alessandro Costa		TBD		
9	(Mexico)	Brandon Moreno	24–10–2	Steady	1	Win	UFC Fight Night 288	Joseph Morales		UFC 335	Charles Johnson	
10	(Uzbekistan)	Ramazan Temirov	20–4	Steady	0	Loss	UFC 333	Lone'er Kavanagh		TBD		
11	(China)	Su Mudaerji	20–7 (1 NC)	Steady	1	Win	UFC Fight Night 286	Alex Perez		TBD		
12	(United States)	Mitch Raposo	12–3	Steady	3	Win	UFC Fight Night 293	Marcos Degli		TBD		
13	(Mexico)	Imanol Rodríguez	8–0	Steady	8	Win	UFC 332	Alden Coria		TBD		
14	(Japan)	Rei Tsuruya	12–1	Steady	2	Win	UFC Fight Night 286	Kevin Borjas		TBD		
15	(United States)	Charles Johnson	20–9	Steady	1	Win	UFC 330	Eduardo Henrique		UFC 335	Brandon Moreno	

== Women's Meta rankings ==
=== Women's Bantamweight ===
Weight limit: 126 to 135 lb • 57.15 to 61.23 kg
Rankings released on November 14, 2026, after UFC 334.

Rank	ISO	Fighter	Record	M	Win streak	Last fight				Next fight		
Rank	ISO	Fighter	Record	M	Win streak	Result	Event	Opponent	Ref.	Event	Opponent	Ref.
C	(United States)	Kayla Harrison	20–1	Steady	5 (1 def)	Win	UFC 334	Amanda Nunes		TBD		
1	(Panama)	Joselyne Edwards	18–6	Steady	5	Win	UFC Fight Night 274	Norma Dumont		TBD		
2	(Argentina)	Ailín Pérez	14–2	Steady	7	Win	UFC Fight Night 289	Norma Dumont		TBD		
3	(Brazil)	Luana Santos	12–2	Steady	4	Win	UFC Fight Night 292	Yana Santos		TBD		
4	(United States)	Julianna Peña	12–6	▲ +1	0	Loss	UFC 316	Kayla Harrison		TBD		
5	(Brazil)	Beatriz Mesquita	9–0	▲ +6	9	Win	UFC 334	Macy Chiasson		TBD		
6	(Portugal)	Jacqueline Cavalcanti	10–2	Steady	0	Loss	UFC Fight Night 276	Ketlen Vieira		UFC 335	Michelle Montague	
7	(New Zealand)	Michelle Montague	8–0	Steady	8	Win	UFC Fight Night 274	Mayra Bueno Silva		UFC 335	Jacqueline Cavalcanti	
8	(Russia)	Yana Santos	17–9 (1 NC)	Steady	0	Loss	UFC Fight Night 292	Luana Santos		TBD		
9	(United States)	Chelsea Chandler	8–4	Steady	2	Win	UFC Fight Night 291	Melissa Croden		TBD		
10	(Brazil)	Karol Rosa	19–8	Steady	0	Loss	UFC Fight Night 279	Luana Santos		TBD		
11	(Brazil)	Alice Pereira	8–1	▲ +1	2	Win	UFC Fight Night 290	Darya Zheleznyakova		TBD		
12	(France)	Nora Cornolle	10–4	▲ +1	1	Win	UFC Fight Night 287	Klaudia Syguła		TBD		
13	(Canada)	Melissa Croden	8–4	▲ +2	0	Loss	UFC Fight Night 291	Chelsea Chandler		TBD		
14	(Serbia)	Nina Milošević	10–1	New entry	10	Win	UFC Fight Night 293	Priscila Cachoeira		TBD		
15	(United States)	Macy Chiasson	11–7	▼ −1	0	Loss	UFC 334	Beatriz Mesquita		TBD		

=== Women's Flyweight ===
Weight limit: 116 to 125 lb • 52.61 to 56.69 kg
Rankings released on November 14, 2026, after UFC 334.

Rank	ISO	Fighter	Record	M	Win streak	Last fight				Next fight		
Rank	ISO	Fighter	Record	M	Win streak	Result	Event	Opponent	Ref.	Event	Opponent	Ref.
C	(Brazil)	Natália Silva	21–5–1	Steady	15 (0 def)	Win	UFC 332	Wang Cong		TBD		
1	(Kyrgyzstan)	Valentina Shevchenko	26–4–1	Steady	3	Win	UFC 322	Zhang Weili		(September 1, 2026) – Back/Shoulder injury		
2	(Mexico)	Alexa Grasso	18–5–1	Steady	2	Win	UFC Fight Night 288	Manon Fiorot		TBD		
3	(Canada)	Jasmine Jasudavicius	16–4	Steady	2	Win	UFC Fight Night 291	Erin Blanchfield		TBD		
4	(France)	Manon Fiorot	13–3	Steady	0	Loss	UFC Fight Night 288	Alexa Grasso		(October 19, 2026) – 3-month CSAD suspension		
5	(United States)	Erin Blanchfield	14–3	Steady	0	Loss	UFC Fight Night 291	Jasmine Jasudavicius		TBD		
6	(China)	Zhang Weili	26–4	Steady	0	Loss	UFC 322	Valentina Shevchenko		TBD		
7	(United States)	Rose Namajunas	14–8	Steady	0	Loss	UFC 324	Natália Silva		TBD		
8	(China)	Wang Cong	10–2	Steady	0	Loss	UFC 332	Natália Silva		TBD		
9	(United States)	Maycee Barber	15–3	Steady	0	Loss	UFC Fight Night 271	Alexa Grasso		(November 6, 2026) – Undisclosed withdrawal		
10	(United States)	Tracy Cortez	12–4	Steady	0	Loss	UFC 329	Wang Cong		TBD		
11	(Australia)	Casey O'Neill	12–2	Steady	3	Win	UFC 331	Eduarda Moura		TBD		
12	(Brazil)	Karine Silva	20–7	Steady	1	Win	UFC Fight Night 293	Gabriella Fernandes		TBD		
13	(United States)	Miranda Maverick	15–6	Steady	0	Loss	UFC on ESPN 69	Rose Namajunas		TBD		
14	(Mexico)	Regina Tarín	9–0	Steady	9	Win	UFC Fight Night 288	JJ Aldrich		TBD		
15	(United States)	Carli Judice	7–2	Steady	2	Win	UFC Fight Night 285	Jeisla Chaves		UFC 335	TBA	

=== Women's Strawweight ===
Weight limit: 106 to 115 lb • 48.08 to 52.16 kg
Rankings released on November 14, 2026, after UFC 334.

Rank	ISO	Fighter	Record	M	Win streak	Last fight				Next fight		
Rank	ISO	Fighter	Record	M	Win streak	Result	Event	Opponent	Ref.	Event	Opponent	Ref.
C	(Brazil)	Mackenzie Dern	17–5	Steady	4 (1 def)	Win	UFC 330	Gillian Robertson		TBD		
1	(United States)	Tatiana Suarez	13–1	Steady	3	Win	UFC Fight Night 293	Virna Jandiroba		TBD		
2	(China)	Zhang Weili	26–4	Steady	0	Loss	UFC 322	Valentina Shevchenko		TBD		
3	(Brazil)	Virna Jandiroba	23–5	Steady	0	Loss	UFC Fight Night 293	Tatiana Suarez		TBD		
4	(Brazil)	Denise Gomes	13–3	Steady	5	Win	UFC Fight Night 286	Yan Xiaonan		TBD		
5	(Canada)	Gillian Robertson	17–9	Steady	0	Loss	UFC 330	Mackenzie Dern		TBD		
6	(United States)	Fatima Kline	10–1	Steady	4	Win	UFC Fight Night 281	Tabatha Ricci		TBD		
7	(Venezuela)	Piera Rodríguez	13–2	Steady	4	Win	UFC Fight Night 292	Talita Alencar		TBD		
8	(Brazil)	Iasmin Lucindo	19–6	Steady	2	Win	UFC 333	Nicolle Caliari		TBD		
9	(Brazil)	Alexia Thainara	15–1	Steady	13	Win	UFC Fight Night 284	Amanda Lemos		TBD		
10	(Mexico)	Loopy Godínez	15–6	Steady	1	Win	UFC Fight Night 290	Ketlen Souza		TBD		
11	(China)	Yan Xiaonan	18–6 (1 NC)	Steady	0	Loss	UFC Fight Night 286	Denise Gomes		TBD		
12	(Japan)	Mizuki Inoue	16–6	Steady	2	Win	UFC 321	Jaqueline Amorim		TBD		
13	(Brazil)	Tabatha Ricci	12–5	Steady	0	Loss	UFC Fight Night 281	Fatima Kline		TBD		
14	(Brazil)	Amanda Lemos	15–7–1	Steady	0	Loss	UFC Fight Night 284	Alexia Thainara		TBD		
15	(United States)	Sam Hughes	11–7	Steady	0	Loss	UFC Fight Night 269	Piera Rodríguez		UFC Fight Night 296	Karolina Kowalkiewicz	

== Men's media rankings ==
=== Men's pound-for-pound ===
Rankings released on November 17, 2026, after UFC 334.

Rank	ISO	Fighter	Record	Win streak	M	Weight class	Status	Next fight		
Rank	ISO	Fighter	Record	Win streak	M	Weight class	Status	Event	Opponent	Ref.
1	(Russia)	Islam Makhachev	29–1	17	Steady	Welterweight	Welterweight Champion			
2	(Australia)	Alexander Volkanovski	29–4	3	Steady	Featherweight	Featherweight Champion			
3	(Russia)	Petr Yan	21–5	5	Steady	Bantamweight	Bantamweight Champion			
4	(United States)	Justin Gaethje	28–5	3	Steady	Lightweight	Lightweight Champion			
5	(Georgia (country))	Ilia Topuria	17–1	0	Steady	Lightweight	#1 in lightweight rankings	(June 14, 2026) – Broken orbital		
6	(Myanmar)	Joshua Van	18–2	8	Steady	Flyweight	Flyweight Champion	UFC 336	Manel Kape	
7	(United States)	Sean Strickland	31–7	2	Steady	Middleweight	Middleweight Champion			
8	(France)	Ciryl Gane	15–2 (1 NC)	2	▲ +4	Heavyweight	Heavyweight Champion			
9	(England)	Tom Aspinall	15–3 (1 NC)	0	▼ −1	Heavyweight	#1 in heavyweight rankings	(March 7, 2026) – Eye surgery		
10	(Georgia (country))	Merab Dvalishvili	21–6	0	▼ −1	Bantamweight	#1 in bantamweight rankings			
11	(Brazil)	Alex Pereira	13–4	0	▼ −1	Heavyweight	#3 in light heavyweight rankings	UFC 335	Sergei Pavlovich	
12	(United Arab Emirates)	Khamzat Chimaev	15–1	0	▼ −1	Middleweight	#1 in middleweight rankings			
13	(Armenia)	Arman Tsarukyan	24–3	6	Steady	Lightweight	#2 in lightweight rankings			
14	(Brazil)	Alexandre Pantoja	30–7	0	Steady	Flyweight	#1 in flyweight rankings			
15	(New Zealand)	Carlos Ulberg	15–1	10	Steady	Light heavyweight	Light Heavyweight Champion	(April 18, 2026) – Torn ACL		

=== Heavyweight ===
Weight limit: 206 to 265 lb • 93.44 kg to 120.20 kg
Rankings released on November 17, 2026, after UFC 334.

Rank	ISO	Fighter	Record	M	Win streak	Last fight				Next fight		
Rank	ISO	Fighter	Record	M	Win streak	Result	Event	Opponent	Ref.	Event	Opponent	Ref.
C	(France)	Ciryl Gane	15–2 (1 NC)	Steady	2 (1 def)	Win	UFC 334	Josh Hokit		TBD		
1	(England)	Tom Aspinall	15–3 (1 NC)	Steady	0	NC	UFC 321	Ciryl Gane		(March 7, 2026) – Eye surgery		
2	(Russia)	Alexander Volkov	41–11	Steady	3	Win	UFC 333	Rizvan Kuniev		TBD		
3	(Russia)	Sergei Pavlovich	21–3	Steady	3	Win	UFC Fight Night 277	Tallison Teixeira		UFC 335	Alex Pereira	
4	(United States)	Josh Hokit	10–1	Steady	0	Loss	UFC 334	Ciryl Gane		TBD		
5	(United States)	Curtis Blaydes	20–6 (1 NC)	Steady	1	Win	UFC Fight Night 288	Waldo Cortes-Acosta		TBD		
6	(Brazil)	Johnny Walker	24–10 (1 NC)	▲ +1	2	Win	UFC Fight Night 293	Waldo Cortes-Acosta		TBD		
7	(Russia)	Rizvan Kuniev	14–4–1 (1 NC)	▼ −1	0	Loss	UFC 333	Alexander Volkov		TBD		
8	(Dominican Republic)	Waldo Cortes-Acosta	17–5	Steady	0	Loss	UFC Fight Night 293	Johnny Walker		TBD		
9	(Brazil)	Vitor Petrino	15–2	Steady	4	Win	UFC Fight Night 285	Serghei Spivac		TBD		
10	(Moldova)	Serghei Spivac	18–7	Steady	0	Loss	UFC Fight Night 285	Vitor Petrino		UFC Fight Night 295	Mario Pinto	
11	(Croatia)	Ante Delija	26–8	Steady	0	Loss	UFC Fight Night 267	Serghei Spivac		(July 17, 2026) – Undisclosed injury		
12	(Brazil)	Valter Walker	16–1	Steady	5	Win	UFC Fight Night 282	Thomas Petersen		TBD		
13	(United States)	Tyrell Fortune	18–4 (2 NC)	Steady	0	Loss	UFC Fight Night 282	Rizvan Kuniev		TBD		
14	(United States)	Derrick Lewis	29–14 (1 NC)	Steady	0	Loss	UFC Freedom 250	Josh Hokit		TBD		
15	(Serbia)	Aleksandar Rakić	15–6	Steady	1	Win	UFC Fight Night 283	Marcin Tybura		TBD		

=== Light Heavyweight ===
Weight limit: 186 to 205 lbs • 84.36 to 92.98 kg
Rankings released on November 17, 2026, after UFC 334.

Rank	ISO	Fighter	Record	M	Win streak	Last fight				Next fight		
Rank	ISO	Fighter	Record	M	Win streak	Result	Event	Opponent	Ref.	Event	Opponent	Ref.
C	(New Zealand)	Carlos Ulberg	14–1	Steady	10 (0 def)	Win	UFC 327	Jiří Procházka		(April 18, 2026) – Torn ACL		
1	(Russia)	Magomed Ankalaev	21–2–1 (1 NC)	Steady	1	Win	UFC Fight Night 282	Bogdan Guskov		TBD		
2	(Czech Republic)	Jiří Procházka	32–7–1	Steady	0	Loss	UFC Fight Night 294	Navajo Stirling		TBD		
3	(Brazil)	Alex Pereira	13–4	Steady	0	Loss	UFC Freedom 250	Ciryl Gane		UFC 335	Sergei Pavlovich	
4	(United States)	Khalil Rountree Jr.	14–7 (1 NC)	Steady	0	Loss	UFC 320	Jiří Procházka		(July 13, 2026) – Undisclosed injury		
5	(New Zealand)	Navajo Stirling	12–0	Steady	12	Win	UFC Fight Night 294	Jiří Procházka		TBD		
6	(Brazil)	Paulo Costa	16–4	Steady	2	Win	UFC 327	Azamat Murzakanov		TBD		
7	(United States)	Dominick Reyes	17–5	Steady	2	Win	UFC 333	Azamat Murzakanov		TBD		
8	(Uzbekistan)	Bogdan Guskov	18–4–1	Steady	0	Loss	UFC Fight Night 282	Magomed Ankalaev		UFC Fight Night 298	Robert Whittaker	
9	(Russia)	Azamat Murzakanov	16–2	Steady	0	Loss	UFC 333	Dominick Reyes		TBD		
10	(Australia)	Robert Whittaker	27–9	Steady	1	Win	UFC 329	Nikita Krylov		UFC Fight Night 298	Bogdan Guskov	
11	(Poland)	Jan Błachowicz	29–12–2	Steady	0	Loss	UFC Fight Night 283	Navajo Stirling		TBD		
12	(Turkey)	Abdul-Rakhman Yakhyaev	11–0	Steady	11	Win	UFC 333	Nikita Krylov		TBD		
13	(United States)	Alonzo Menifield	19–6–1	Steady	2	Win	UFC 331	Iwo Baraniewski		TBD		
14	(Netherlands)	Reinier de Ridder	22–4	Steady	1	Win	UFC Fight Night 285	Roman Dolidze		TBD		
15	(Russia)	Nikita Krylov	31–13	Steady	0	Loss	UFC 333	Abdul-Rakhman Yakhyaev		TBD		

=== Middleweight ===
Weight limit: 171 to 185 lb • 77.56 to 83.91 kg
Rankings released on November 17, 2026, after UFC 334.

Rank	ISO	Fighter	Record	M	Win streak	Last fight				Next fight		
Rank	ISO	Fighter	Record	M	Win streak	Result	Event	Opponent	Ref.	Event	Opponent	Ref.
C	(United States)	Sean Strickland	31–7	Steady	2 (0 def)	Win	UFC 328	Khamzat Chimaev		TBD		
1	(United Arab Emirates)	Khamzat Chimaev	15–1	Steady	0	Loss	UFC 328	Sean Strickland		TBD		
2	(South Africa)	Dricus du Plessis	24–3	Steady	1	Win	UFC Fight Night 281	Kamaru Usman		TBD		
3	(France)	Nassourdine Imavov	17–4 (1 NC)	Steady	5	Win	UFC Fight Night 258	Caio Borralho		TBD		
4	(United States)	Brendan Allen	28–7	Steady	4	Win	UFC Fight Night 290	Christian Leroy Duncan		TBD		
5	(Brazil)	Caio Borralho	19–2 (1 NC)	Steady	2	Win	UFC 334	Yousri Belgaroui		TBD		
6	(United States)	Joe Pyfer	16–3	Steady	4	Win	UFC Fight Night 271	Israel Adesanya		UFC Fight Night 299	Bo Nickal	
7	(Brazil)	Gregory Rodrigues	20–6	Steady	4	Win	UFC Fight Night 285	Anthony Hernandez		TBD		
8	(United States)	Anthony Hernandez	15–4 (1 NC)	Steady	0	Loss	UFC Fight Night 285	Gregory Rodrigues		TBD		
9	(Nigeria)	Israel Adesanya	24–6	Steady	0	Loss	UFC Fight Night 271	Joe Pyfer		UFC Fight Night 295	Sharabutdin Magomedov	
10	(England)	Christian Leroy Duncan	15–3	Steady	0	Loss	UFC Fight Night 290	Brendan Allen		TBD		
11	(Germany)	Abusupiyan Magomedov	30–7–1	Steady	2	Win	UFC 333	Cameron Rowston		TBD		
12	(United States)	Jared Cannonier	18–11	Steady	0	Loss	UFC Fight Night 294	Ikram Aliskerov		TBD		
13	(Russia)	Ikram Aliskerov	19–2	Steady	4	Win	UFC Fight Night 294	Jared Cannonier		TBD		
14	(United States)	Bo Nickal	9–1	Steady	2	Win	UFC Freedom 250	Kyle Daukaus		UFC Fight Night 299	Joe Pyfer	
15	(Russia)	Sharabutdin Magomedov	18–1	Steady	2	Win	UFC Fight Night 280	Michel Pereira		UFC Fight Night 295	Israel Adesanya	

=== Welterweight ===
Weight limit: 156 to 170 lb • 70.76 to 77.11 kg
Rankings released on November 10, 2026, after UFC 334.

Rank	ISO	Fighter	Record	M	Win streak	Last fight				Next fight		
Rank	ISO	Fighter	Record	M	Win streak	Result	Event	Opponent	Ref.	Event	Opponent	Ref.
C	(Russia)	Islam Makhachev	29–1	Steady	17 (1 def)	Win	UFC 330	Ian Machado Garry		TBD		
1	(Republic of Ireland)	Ian Machado Garry	17–2	Steady	0	Loss	UFC 330	Islam Makhachev		UFC Fight Night 295	Yaroslav Amosov	
2	(Brazil)	Carlos Prates	24–7	Steady	3	Win	UFC Fight Night 275	Jack Della Maddalena		UFC 336	Michael Morales	
3	(Ecuador)	Michael Morales	19–0	Steady	19	Win	UFC 322	Sean Brady		UFC 336	Carlos Prates	
4	(Australia)	Jack Della Maddalena	18–4	Steady	0	Loss	UFC Fight Night 275	Carlos Prates		TBD		
5	(Brazil)	Gabriel Bonfim	20–1	Steady	5	Win	UFC Fight Night 278	Belal Muhammad		UFC Fight Night 297	Sean Brady	
6	(United States)	Sean Brady	19–2	Steady	1	Win	UFC 328	Joaquin Buckley		UFC Fight Night 297	Gabriel Bonfim	
7	(United States)	Belal Muhammad	24–6 (1 NC)	Steady	0	Loss	UFC Fight Night 278	Gabriel Bonfim		TBD		
8	(England)	Leon Edwards	22–6 (1 NC)	Steady	0	Loss	UFC 322	Carlos Prates		TBD		
9	(Canada)	Mike Malott	15–2–1	Steady	5	Win	UFC Fight Night 291	Joaquin Buckley		TBD		
10	(Nigeria)	Kamaru Usman	21–5	Steady	0	Loss	UFC Fight Night 281	Dricus du Plessis		TBD		
11	(Ukraine)	Yaroslav Amosov	30–1	▲ +1	3	Win	UFC 328	Joel Álvarez		UFC Fight Night 295	Ian Machado Garry	
12	(Serbia)	Uroš Medić	14–3–1	▼ −1	0	Draw	UFC 334	Kevin Holland		TBD		
13	(United States)	Joaquin Buckley	21–9	Steady	0	Loss	UFC Fight Night 291	Mike Malott		TBD		
14	(United States)	Kevin Holland	29–15–1 (1 NC)	▲ +1	0	Draw	UFC 334	Uroš Medić		TBD		
15	(United States)	Daniel Rodriguez	20–6	▼ −1	0	Loss	UFC Fight Night 283	Uroš Medić		UFC Fight Night 296	Roberto Soldić	

=== Lightweight ===
Weight limit: 146 to 155 lb • 66.22 to 70.30 kg
Rankings released on November 17, 2026, after UFC 334.

Rank	ISO	Fighter	Record	M	Win streak	Last fight				Next fight		
Rank	ISO	Fighter	Record	M	Win streak	Result	Event	Opponent	Ref.	Event	Opponent	Ref.
C	(United States)	Justin Gaethje	28–5	Steady	3 (0 def)	Win	UFC Freedom 250	Ilia Topuria		TBD		
1	(Georgia (country))	Ilia Topuria	17–1	Steady	0	Loss	UFC Freedom 250	Justin Gaethje		(June 14, 2026) – Broken orbital		
2	(Armenia)	Arman Tsarukyan	24–3	Steady	6	Win	UFC 331	Maurício Ruffy		TBD		
3	(Brazil)	Charles Oliveira	37–11 (1 NC)	Steady	2	Win	UFC 326	Max Holloway		UFC 335	Diego Lopes	
4	(United States)	Max Holloway	28–9	Steady	1	Win	UFC 329	Conor McGregor		TBD		
5	(England)	Paddy Pimblett	24–4	Steady	1	Win	UFC 329	Benoît Saint Denis		TBD		
6	(France)	Benoît Saint Denis	17–4 (1 NC)	Steady	0	Loss	UFC 329	Paddy Pimblett		UFC Fight Night 298	Quillan Salkilld	
7	(Australia)	Quillan Salkilld	13–1	Steady	13	Win	UFC Fight Night 284	Mateusz Gamrot		UFC Fight Night 298	Benoît Saint Denis	
8	(Brazil)	Maurício Ruffy	14–3	Steady	0	Loss	UFC 331	Arman Tsarukyan		TBD		
9	(France)	Salahdine Parnasse	24–2	Steady	6	Win	UFC Fight Night 287	Dan Hooker		TBD		
10	(Poland)	Mateusz Gamrot	26–5 (1 NC)	Steady	0	Loss	UFC Fight Night 284	Quillan Salkilld		TBD		
11	(Azerbaijan)	Rafael Fiziev	14–5	Steady	1	Win	UFC Fight Night 280	Manuel Torres		TBD		
12	(Australia)	Tom Nolan	12–1	Steady	6	Win	UFC Fight Night 292	Renato Moicano		TBD		
13	(Brazil)	Renato Moicano	21–8–1	Steady	0	Loss	UFC Fight Night 292	Tom Nolan		TBD		
14	(New Zealand)	Dan Hooker	25–15	Steady	1	Win	UFC Fight Night 294	Brian Ortega		TBD		
15	(United States)	Grant Dawson	25–3–1	Steady	2	Win	UFC 333	Nurullo Aliev		TBD		

=== Featherweight ===
Weight limit: 136 to 145 lb • 61.68 to 65.77 kg
Rankings released on November 17, 2026, after UFC 334.

Rank	ISO	Fighter	Record	M	Win streak	Last fight				Next fight		
Rank	ISO	Fighter	Record	M	Win streak	Result	Event	Opponent	Ref.	Event	Opponent	Ref.
C	(Australia)	Alexander Volkanovski	29–4	Steady	3 (2 def)	Win	UFC 333	Movsar Evloev		TBD		
1	(Russia)	Movsar Evloev	20–1	Steady	0	Loss	UFC 333	Alexander Volkanovski		TBD		
2	(Brazil)	Diego Lopes	28–8	Steady	1	Win	UFC Freedom 250	Steve Garcia		UFC 335	Charles Oliveira	
3	(England)	Lerone Murphy	17–1–1	Steady	0	Loss	UFC Fight Night 270	Movsar Evloev		TBD		
4	(United States)	Aljamain Sterling	26–6	Steady	0	Loss	UFC Fight Night 294	Kevin Vallejos		TBD		
5	(Brazil)	Jean Silva	18–3	Steady	2	Win	UFC Fight Night 288	Jose Delgado		TBD		
6	(England)	Arnold Allen	21–4	Steady	1	Win	UFC Fight Night 276	Melquizael Costa		(September 18, 2026) – Undisclosed injury		
7	(Mexico)	Yair Rodríguez	20–5 (1 NC)	Steady	1	Win	UFC 314	Patrício Pitbull		UFC Fight Night 296	Steve Garcia	
8	(Morocco)	Youssef Zalal	18–6–1	Steady	0	Loss	UFC Fight Night 274	Aljamain Sterling		TBD		
9	(Argentina)	Kevin Vallejos	19–1	Steady	8	Win	UFC Fight Night 294	Aljamain Sterling		TBD		
10	(United States)	Steve Garcia	19–6	Steady	0	Loss	UFC Freedom 250	Diego Lopes		UFC Fight Night 296	Yair Rodríguez	
11	(United States)	Aaron Pico	15–5	Steady	2	Win	UFC 333	Losene Keita		TBD		
12	(Brazil)	Patrício Pitbull	38–9	▲ +2	1	Win	UFC 331	Choi Doo-ho		TBD		
13	(United States)	Brian Ortega	16–6 (1 NC)	Steady	0	Loss	UFC Fight Night 294	Dan Hooker		TBD		
14	(Uganda)	David Onama	14–3	▲ +1	0	Loss	UFC Fight Night 263	Steve Garcia		TBD		
15	(United States)	Pat Sabatini	22–5	New entry	4	Win	UFC 328	William Gomis		UFC Fight Night 297	Vinicius Oliveira	

=== Bantamweight ===
Weight limit: 126 to 135 lbs • 57.15 to 61.23 kg
Rankings released on November 17, 2026, after UFC 334.

Rank	ISO	Fighter	Record	M	Win streak	Last fight				Next fight		
Rank	ISO	Fighter	Record	M	Win streak	Result	Event	Opponent	Ref.	Event	Opponent	Ref.
C	(Russia)	Petr Yan	21–5	Steady	5 (1 def)	Win	UFC 333	Merab Dvalishvili		TBD		
1	(Georgia (country))	Merab Dvalishvili	21–6	Steady	0	Loss	UFC 333	Petr Yan		TBD		
2	(United States)	Sean O'Malley	20–3 (1 NC)	Steady	2	Win	UFC Freedom 250	Aiemann Zahabi		TBD		
3	(China)	Song Yadong	24–9–1 (1 NC)	Steady	2	Win	UFC Fight Night 286	Umar Nurmagomedov		TBD		
4	(Russia)	Umar Nurmagomedov	20–2	Steady	0	Loss	UFC Fight Night 286	Song Yadong		TBD		
5	(United States)	Mario Bautista	18–3	Steady	2	Win	UFC 329	Cory Sandhagen		TBD		
6	(United States)	Cory Sandhagen	18–7	Steady	0	Loss	UFC 329	Mario Bautista		TBD		
7	(United States)	Payton Talbott	12–1	Steady	3	Win	UFC 332	Deiveson Figueiredo		TBD		
8	(Mexico)	David Martínez	15–1	Steady	11	Win	UFC Fight Night 288	Dan Ige		TBD		
9	(Canada)	Aiemann Zahabi	14–3	Steady	0	Loss	UFC Freedom 250	Sean O'Malley		TBD		
10	(Mexico)	Raul Rosas Jr.	13–1	Steady	6	Win	UFC Fight Night 289	Raoni Barcelos		TBD		
11	(Ecuador)	Marlon Vera	24–12–1	Steady	1	Win	UFC 331	Charles Jourdain		TBD		
12	(Brazil)	Deiveson Figueiredo	25–8–1	Steady	0	Loss	UFC 332	Payton Talbott		TBD		
13	(United States)	Marcus McGhee	12–2	Steady	2	Win	UFC 332	Anthony Romero		TBD		
14	(Brazil)	Raoni Barcelos	22–6	Steady	0	Loss	UFC Fight Night 289	Raul Rosas Jr.		TBD		
15	(United States)	Bryce Mitchell	19–3	Steady	2	Win	UFC Fight Night 278	Santiago Luna		TBD		

=== Flyweight ===
Weight limit: 116 to 125 lb • 52.61 to 56.69 kg
Rankings released on November 17, 2026, after UFC 334.

Rank	ISO	Fighter	Record	M	Win streak	Last fight				Next fight		
Rank	ISO	Fighter	Record	M	Win streak	Result	Event	Opponent	Ref.	Event	Opponent	Ref.
C	(Myanmar)	Joshua Van	18–2	Steady	8 (2 def)	Win	UFC 331	Alexandre Pantoja		UFC 336	Manel Kape	
1	(Brazil)	Alexandre Pantoja	30–7	Steady	0	Loss	UFC 331	Joshua Van		TBD		
2	(Portugal)	Manel Kape	23–7	Steady	4	Win	UFC Fight Night 279	Kyoji Horiguchi		UFC 336	Joshua Van	
3	(United States)	Brandon Royval	18–9	Steady	1	Win	UFC 329	Lone'er Kavanagh		TBD		
4	(Japan)	Tatsuro Taira	18–2	Steady	0	Loss	UFC 328	Joshua Van		TBD		
5	(Japan)	Kyoji Horiguchi	37–6 (1 NC)	Steady	1	Win	UFC Fight Night 294	Asu Almabayev		TBD		
6	(England)	Lone'er Kavanagh	11–2	Steady	1	Win	UFC 333	Ramazan Temirov		TBD		
7	(Kazakhstan)	Asu Almabayev	24–4	Steady	0	Loss	UFC Fight Night 294	Kyoji Horiguchi		TBD		
8	(Mexico)	Brandon Moreno	24–10–2	Steady	1	Win	UFC Fight Night 288	Joseph Morales		UFC 335	Charles Johnson	
9	(Iraq)	Amir Albazi	18–3	Steady	1	Win	UFC Fight Night 294	Alessandro Costa		TBD		
10	(Uzbekistan)	Ramazan Temirov	20–4	Steady	0	Loss	UFC 333	Lone'er Kavanagh		TBD		
11	(United States)	Tim Elliott	22–14–1	Steady	1	Win	UFC Fight Night 288	Édgar Cháirez		TBD		
12 (T)	(China)	Su Mudaerji	20–7 (1 NC)	Steady	1	Win	UFC Fight Night 286	Alex Perez		TBD		
12 (T)	(Australia)	Steve Erceg	14–5	Steady	0	Loss	UFC Fight Night 282	Ramazan Temirov		TBD		
14	(United States)	Charles Johnson	20–9	Steady	1	Win	UFC 330	Eduardo Henrique		UFC 335	Brandon Moreno	
15	(Russia)	Tagir Ulanbekov	17–3	Steady	0	Loss	UFC Fight Night 265	Kyoji Horiguchi		TBD		

== Women's media rankings ==
=== Women's pound-for-pound ===
Rankings released on November 17, 2026, after UFC 334.

Rank	ISO	Fighter	Record	Win streak	M	Weight class	Status	Next fight		
Rank	ISO	Fighter	Record	Win streak	M	Weight class	Status	Event	Opponent	Ref.
1	(United States)	Kayla Harrison	20–1	5	▲ +1	Bantamweight	Bantamweight Champion			
2	(Kyrgyzstan)	Valentina Shevchenko	26–4–1	3	▼ −1	Flyweight	#1 in flyweight rankings	(September 1, 2026) – Back/Shoulder injury		
3	(China)	Zhang Weili	26–4	0	Steady	Flyweight; Strawweight	#1 in strawweight rankings			
4	(Brazil)	Natália Silva	21–5–1	15	Steady	Flyweight	Flyweight Champion			
5	(Brazil)	Mackenzie Dern	17–5	4	Steady	Strawweight	Strawweight Champion			
6	(Mexico)	Alexa Grasso	18–5–1	2	Steady	Flyweight	#2 in flyweight rankings			
7	(France)	Manon Fiorot	13–3	0	Steady	Flyweight	#3 in flyweight rankings	(October 19, 2026) – 3-month CSAD suspension		
8	(United States)	Tatiana Suarez	13–1	3	Steady	Strawweight	#2 in strawweight rankings			
9	(Canada)	Jasmine Jasudavicius	16–4	2	Steady	Flyweight	#4 in flyweight rankings			
10	(Brazil)	Amanda Nunes	23–6	0	New entry	Bantamweight	#1 in bantamweight rankings			
11	(United States)	Erin Blanchfield	14–3	0	▼ −1	Flyweight	#5 in flyweight rankings			
12	(United States)	Julianna Peña	12–6	0	▼ −1	Bantamweight	#2 in bantamweight rankings			
13	(Brazil)	Virna Jandiroba	23–5	0	▼ −1	Strawweight	#3 in strawweight rankings			
14	(United States)	Rose Namajunas	14–8	0	▼ −1	Flyweight	#6 in flyweight rankings			
15	(Brazil)	Denise Gomes	13–3	5	▼ −1	Strawweight	#4 in strawweight rankings			

=== Women's Bantamweight ===
Weight limit: 126 to 135 lb • 57.15 to 61.23 kg
Rankings released on November 17, 2026, after UFC 334.

Rank	ISO	Fighter	Record	M	Win streak	Last fight				Next fight		
Rank	ISO	Fighter	Record	M	Win streak	Result	Event	Opponent	Ref.	Event	Opponent	Ref.
C	(United States)	Kayla Harrison	20–1	Steady	5 (1 def)	Win	UFC 334	Amanda Nunes		TBD		
1	(Brazil)	Amanda Nunes	23–6	New entry	0	Loss	UFC 334	Kayla Harrison		TBD		
2 (T)	(Panama)	Joselyne Edwards	18–6	▼ −1	5	Win	UFC Fight Night 274	Norma Dumont		TBD		
2 (T)	(United States)	Julianna Peña	12–6	▼ −1	0	Loss	UFC 316	Kayla Harrison		TBD		
4	(Argentina)	Ailín Pérez	14–2	▼ −1	7	Win	UFC Fight Night 289	Norma Dumont		TBD		
5	(Brazil)	Luana Santos	12–2	Steady	4	Win	UFC Fight Night 292	Yana Santos		TBD		
6	(Russia)	Yana Santos	17–9 (1 NC)	▲ +1	0	Loss	UFC Fight Night 292	Luana Santos		TBD		
7	(United States)	Raquel Pennington	16–9	▼ −2	0	Loss	UFC 307	Julianna Peña		(August 7, 2025) – Undisclosed injury		
8	(Brazil)	Beatriz Mesquita	9–0	▲ +3	9	Win	UFC 334	Macy Chiasson		TBD		
9	(Portugal)	Jacqueline Cavalcanti	10–2	▼ −1	0	Loss	UFC Fight Night 276	Ketlen Vieira		UFC 335	Michelle Montague	
10	(Brazil)	Karol Rosa	19–8	▼ −1	0	Loss	UFC Fight Night 279	Luana Santos		TBD		
11	(New Zealand)	Michelle Montague	8–0	▲ +1	8	Win	UFC Fight Night 274	Mayra Bueno Silva		UFC 335	Jacqueline Cavalcanti	
12	(United States)	Macy Chiasson	11–7	▼ −2	0	Loss	UFC 334	Beatriz Mesquita		TBD		
13	(France)	Nora Cornolle	10–4	Steady	1	Win	UFC Fight Night 287	Klaudia Syguła		TBD		
14	(Brazil)	Alice Pereira	8–1	Steady	2	Win	UFC Fight Night 290	Darya Zheleznyakova		TBD		
15	(United States)	Chelsea Chandler	8–4	Steady	2	Win	UFC Fight Night 291	Melissa Croden		TBD		

=== Women's Flyweight ===
Weight limit: 116 to 125 lb • 52.61 to 56.69 kg
Rankings released on November 17, 2026, after UFC 334.

Rank	ISO	Fighter	Record	M	Win streak	Last fight				Next fight		
Rank	ISO	Fighter	Record	M	Win streak	Result	Event	Opponent	Ref.	Event	Opponent	Ref.
C	(Brazil)	Natália Silva	21–5–1	Steady	15 (0 def)	Win	UFC 332	Wang Cong		TBD		
1	(Kyrgyzstan)	Valentina Shevchenko	26–4–1	Steady	3	Win	UFC 322	Zhang Weili		(September 1, 2026) – Back/Shoulder injury		
2	(Mexico)	Alexa Grasso	18–5–1	Steady	2	Win	UFC Fight Night 288	Manon Fiorot		TBD		
3	(France)	Manon Fiorot	13–3	Steady	0	Loss	UFC Fight Night 288	Alexa Grasso		(October 19, 2026) – 3-month CSAD suspension		
4	(Canada)	Jasmine Jasudavicius	16–4	Steady	2	Win	UFC Fight Night 291	Erin Blanchfield		TBD		
5	(United States)	Erin Blanchfield	14–3	Steady	0	Loss	UFC Fight Night 291	Jasmine Jasudavicius		TBD		
6	(United States)	Rose Namajunas	14–8	Steady	0	Loss	UFC 324	Natália Silva		TBD		
7	(United States)	Maycee Barber	15–3	Steady	0	Loss	UFC Fight Night 271	Alexa Grasso		(November 6, 2026) – Undisclosed withdrawal		
8	(China)	Wang Cong	10–2	Steady	0	Loss	UFC 332	Natália Silva		TBD		
9	(United States)	Tracy Cortez	12–4	Steady	0	Loss	UFC 329	Wang Cong		TBD		
10	(United States)	Miranda Maverick	15–6	Steady	0	Loss	UFC on ESPN 69	Rose Namajunas		TBD		
11	(Brazil)	Karine Silva	20–7	Steady	1	Win	UFC Fight Night 293	Gabriella Fernandes		TBD		
12	(Australia)	Casey O'Neill	12–2	Steady	3	Win	UFC 331	Eduarda Moura		TBD		
13	(Brazil)	Eduarda Moura	12–3	Steady	0	Loss	UFC 331	Casey O'Neill		TBD		
14	(Mexico)	Regina Tarín	9–0	Steady	9	Win	UFC Fight Night 288	JJ Aldrich		TBD		
15	(Brazil)	Gabriella Fernandes	11–5	Steady	0	Loss	UFC Fight Night 293	Karine Silva		TBD		

=== Women's Strawweight ===
Weight limit: 106 to 115 lb • 48.08 to 52.16 kg
Rankings released on November 17, 2026, after UFC 334.

Rank	ISO	Fighter	Record	M	Win streak	Last fight				Next fight		
Rank	ISO	Fighter	Record	M	Win streak	Result	Event	Opponent	Ref.	Event	Opponent	Ref.
C	(Brazil)	Mackenzie Dern	17–5	Steady	4 (1 def)	Win	UFC 330	Gillian Robertson		TBD		
1	(China)	Zhang Weili	26–4	Steady	0	Loss	UFC 322	Valentina Shevchenko		TBD		
2	(United States)	Tatiana Suarez	13–1	Steady	3	Win	UFC Fight Night 293	Virna Jandiroba		TBD		
3	(Brazil)	Virna Jandiroba	23–5	Steady	0	Loss	UFC Fight Night 293	Tatiana Suarez		TBD		
4	(Brazil)	Denise Gomes	13–3	Steady	5	Win	UFC Fight Night 286	Yan Xiaonan		TBD		
5	(Canada)	Gillian Robertson	17–9	Steady	0	Loss	UFC 330	Mackenzie Dern		TBD		
6	(United States)	Fatima Kline	10–1	Steady	4	Win	UFC Fight Night 281	Tabatha Ricci		TBD		
7	(China)	Yan Xiaonan	18–6 (1 NC)	Steady	0	Loss	UFC Fight Night 286	Denise Gomes		TBD		
8	(Mexico)	Loopy Godínez	15–6	Steady	1	Win	UFC Fight Night 290	Ketlen Souza		TBD		
9	(Brazil)	Alexia Thainara	15–1	Steady	13	Win	UFC Fight Night 284	Amanda Lemos		TBD		
10	(Brazil)	Tabatha Ricci	12–5	Steady	0	Loss	UFC Fight Night 281	Fatima Kline		TBD		
11	(Brazil)	Amanda Lemos	15–7–1	Steady	0	Loss	UFC Fight Night 284	Alexia Thainara		TBD		
12	(Brazil)	Jéssica Andrade	26–15	Steady	0	Loss	UFC 319	Loopy Godínez		TBD		
13	(Brazil)	Amanda Ribas	13–7	Steady	0	Loss	UFC on ABC 9	Tabatha Ricci		(June 17, 2026) – Dizziness		
14	(Venezuela)	Piera Rodríguez	13–2	Steady	4	Win	UFC Fight Night 292	Talita Alencar		TBD		
15	(United States)	Angela Hill	19–16	Steady	1	Win	UFC Fight Night 277	Xiong Jingnan		UFC 335	Shanelle Dyer	

== See also ==
- List of undefeated mixed martial artists
- List of current UFC fighters
- List of UFC champions
