= Iasmin Lucindo =

Brazilian mixed martial artist (born 2002)

- Born: Iasmin Lucindo Bezerra; January 8, 2002 (age 24); Fortaleza, Ceara, Brazil
- Height: 5 ft 3 in (1.60 m)
- Weight: 116 lb (53 kg; 8.3 st)
- Division: Strawweight (2017, 2022–present); Flyweight (2017–2023)
- Reach: 66 in (170 cm)
- Fighting out of: Feira de Santana, Brazil
- Team: Academia Fight House
- Years active: 2017–present

Mixed martial arts record
- Total: 25
- Wins: 19
- By knockout: 8
- By submission: 3
- By decision: 8
- Losses: 6
- By knockout: 1
- By submission: 2
- By decision: 3

Other information
- Mixed martial arts record from Sherdog

Iasmin Lucindo Bezerra (born January 8, 2002) is a Brazilian mixed martial artist who competes in the women's Strawweight division of the Ultimate Fighting Championship (UFC). As of October 31, 2026, she is #8 in the Meta UFC women's strawweight rankings.

== Mixed martial arts career ==
=== Early career ===
Lucindo made her MMA debut in 2017 when she was 15 years old, after initially training to deal with domestic violence in her family. She would go on to amass a fight record of 13–4 prior to signing with the UFC.

=== Ultimate Fighting Championship ===
Lucindo made her UFC debut on August 13, 2022 against fellow debutant Yazmin Jauregui at UFC on ESPN 41, replacing an injured Istela Nunes. She lost by unanimous decision.

Lucindo was expected to face Melissa Martinez on April 22, 2023 at UFC Fight Night 222. However Martinez withdrew for undisclosed reasons and was replaced by Brogan Walker in a flyweight bout. Lucindo won by unanimous decision.

Lucindo faced Polyana Viana on August 12, 2023, at UFC on ESPN 51. She won by second round arm-triangle choke, earning her a Performance of the Night award.

Lucindo was slated to fight Elise Reed on September 16, 2023 at UFC Fight Night 227 in a catchweight bout of 120 pounds, replacing Cynthia Calvillo. However, Reed withdrew due to undisclosed reasons, replaced by newcomer Josefine Lindgren Knutsson. Lucindo would then withdraw due to an undisclosed injury and was replaced by another newcomer, Marnic Mann.

Lucindo faced Karolina Kowalkiewicz on May 4, 2024, at UFC 301. She won by unanimous decision.

Lucindo faced Marina Rodriguez on October 5, 2024, at UFC 307. She won by split decision.

Lucindo faced former UFC Women's Strawweight Championship challenger Amanda Lemos on March 8, 2025, at UFC 313. She lost by unanimous decision.

Lucindo faced Angela Hill on August 9, 2025, at UFC on ESPN 72. She won by unanimous decision.

Lucindo was slated to fight Gillian Robertson on December 13, 2025 at UFC on ESPN 73. However, Lucindo withdrew due to an undisclosed injury and was replaced by Amanda Lemos. It was later revealed that Lucindo was temporarily suspended by the Nevada State Athletic Commission after failing a drug test in September from a tainted supplement. As a result, she was suspended for nine months and was not eligible to compete again until June 24, 2026.

Lucindo faced Nicolle Caliari on October 24, 2026 at UFC 333. At the weigh-ins, Caliari weighed in at 120.5 pounds, four and a half pound over the women's strawweight non-title fight limit. As a result, she was fined 30 percent of her purse, which went to Lucindo. Lucindo won the bout via unanimous decision.

== Championships and accomplishments ==
- Ultimate Fighting Championship
  - Performance of the Night (One time) vs. Polyana Viana
- Samurai Fight House
  - Samurai Fight House Women's Flyweight Champion (One time)

== Mixed martial arts record ==
Professional record breakdown
25 matches	19 wins	6 losses
By knockout	8	1
By submission	3	2
By decision	8	3

Res.	Record	Opponent	Method	Event	Date	Round	Time	Location	Notes
Win	19–6	Nicolle Caliari	Decision (unanimous)	UFC 333	October 24, 2026	3	5:00	Abu Dhabi, United Arab Emirates	Catchweight (120.5 lb) bout; Caliari missed weight.
Win	18–6	Angela Hill	Decision (unanimous)	UFC on ESPN: Dolidze vs. Hernandez	August 9, 2025	3	5:00	Las Vegas, Nevada, United States	
Loss	17–6	Amanda Lemos	Decision (unanimous)	UFC 313	March 8, 2025	3	5:00	Las Vegas, Nevada, United States	
Win	17–5	Marina Rodriguez	Decision (split)	UFC 307	October 5, 2024	3	5:00	Salt Lake City, Utah, United States	
Win	16–5	Karolina Kowalkiewicz	Decision (unanimous)	UFC 301	May 4, 2024	3	5:00	Rio de Janeiro, Brazil	
Win	15–5	Polyana Viana	Submission (arm-triangle choke)	UFC on ESPN: Luque vs. dos Anjos	August 12, 2023	2	3:42	Las Vegas, Nevada, United States	Performance of the Night.
Win	14–5	Brogan Walker	Decision (unanimous)	UFC Fight Night: Pavlovich vs. Blaydes	April 22, 2023	3	5:00	Las Vegas, Nevada, United States	Flyweight bout.
Loss	13–5	Yazmin Jauregui	Decision (unanimous)	UFC on ESPN: Vera vs. Cruz	August 13, 2022	3	5:00	San Diego, California, United States	Return to Strawweight.
Win	13–4	Lucrezia Ria	Decision (unanimous)	Cage Fight Series 10	April 9, 2022	3	5:00	Graz, Austria	
Win	12–4	Sharolayne Almeida	TKO (punches)	Natal Fight Championship 21	November 13, 2021	1	1:08	Feira de Santana, Brazil	Catchweight (143 lb) bout.
Win	11–4	Beriuzka Canelon	TKO (punch)	Samurai Fight House 1	August 21, 2021	2	2:13	Feira de Santana, Brazil	Won the inaugural SFH Women's Flyweight Championship.
Win	10–4	Sarah Frota	Decision (split)	Road to Future 3	August 1, 2021	3	5:00	Goiânia, Brazil	
Win	9–4	Tainá Santos	TKO (punches)	Action Fight 16	October 31, 2020	3	2:24	Fortaleza, Brazil	Strawweight bout.
Win	8–4	Layze Cerqueira	Decision (unanimous)	BrazilMMA 1	August 17, 2019	1	1:53	Salvador, Brazil	
Win	7–4	Jéssica Coelho	TKO (punches)	Victorious MMA 2	June 15, 2019	1	4:50	Fortaleza, Brazil	
Loss	6–4	Barbara Acioly	Submission (guillotine choke)	Invictus Kombat 1	May 10, 2019	3	4:00	Rio Largo, Brazil	
Win	6–3	Ana Nicoly	Submission (armbar)	Caucaia Fight Champions	May 5, 2019	1	4:58	Caucaia, Brazil	
Loss	5–3	Sthefanie Jessika Oliveira	Submission (armbar)	Ita Fight 4	December 14, 2018	2	2:53	Itapajé, Brazil	
Win	5–2	Ana Jeize	TKO (punches)	Punch Fight	August 11, 2018	1	1:35	Mossoró, Brazil	
Win	4–2	Jéssica Coelho	Submission (armbar)	Action Fight 9	April 29, 2018	2	0:54	Fortaleza, Brazil	
Loss	3–2	Gabriella Fernandes	TKO (punches)	Parelhas Fight Combat 5	March 24, 2018	1	3:20	Parelhas, Brazil	
Loss	3–1	Sthefanie Jessika Oliveira	Decision (split)	Action Fight 7	December 16, 2017	3	5:00	Fortaleza, Brazil	Return to Flyweight.
Win	3–0	Ana Jeize	TKO (punches)	Coronel Combate 9	September 2, 2017	1	2:10	Maranguape, Brazil	Strawweight debut.
Win	2–0	Jardiane Cardoso	TKO (punches)	1º Round Combat 4	July 29, 2017	1	1:55	Tiangua, Brazil	
Win	1–0	Alline Khyra	TKO (punches)	Big Fight	May 10, 2017	3	4:12	Maracanaú, Brazil	Flyweight debut.

== See also ==
- List of current UFC fighters
- List of female mixed martial artists
