= UFC Fight Night: Moicano vs. Nolan =

Mixed martial arts event in 2026

- The poster for UFC Fight Night: Moicano vs. Nolan
- Promotion: Ultimate Fighting Championship
- Date: October 31, 2026
- Venue: Meta Apex
- City: Enterprise, Nevada, United States
- Attendance: Not announced

Event chronology
UFC 333: Volkanovski vs. Evloev	UFC Fight Night: Moicano vs. Nolan	UFC Fight Night: Cortes-Acosta vs. Walker

UFC Fight Night: Moicano vs. Nolan (also known as UFC Fight Night 292 and UFC Vegas 123) was a mixed martial arts event produced by the Ultimate Fighting Championship that took place on October 31, 2026, at the Meta Apex in Enterprise, Nevada, part of the Las Vegas Valley, United States.

== Background ==
A lightweight bout between former UFC Lightweight Championship challenger Renato Moicano and Tom Nolan headlined the event.

A welterweight bout between Randy Brown and former LFA Welterweight Champion Carlos Leal was scheduled for the event. However, Leal withdrew due to an injury and was replaced by undefeated prospect Jacobe Smith.

A featherweight bout between Francis Marshall and Gastón Bolaños was scheduled for the event. However, Bolaños withdrew due to an eye laceration suffered in training and was replaced by Dakota Hope. At the weigh-ins, Marshall weighed in at 148 pounds, two pounds over the division's non-title fight limit. The bout proceeded at catchweight and he was fined 20 percent of his purse, which went to Hope.

A flyweight bout between Cody Durden and Ode' Osbourne is scheduled for the event. They were previously scheduled for UFC 329 in July, but Osbourne had to withdraw due to an undisclosed injury.

A middleweight bout between former LFA Middleweight Champion Azamat Bekoev and Andre Petroski was scheduled at the event. However, the bout was removed from the event due to Bekoev suffering a medical emergency and Petroski was rescheduled to compete at UFC Fight Night: Bonfim vs. Brady one week later.

== Results ==
Fight card (Paramount+)
Weight class				Method	Round	Time	Notes
Lightweight	Tom Nolan	def.	Renato Moicano	TKO (punches and elbows)	3	1:28
Welterweight	Jacobe Smith	def.	Randy Brown	Decision (unanimous) (30–26, 30–26, 30–26)	3	5:00	(Note: Brown was deducted one point in round 2 due to repeatedly grabbing the fence.)
Flyweight	Cody Durden	def.	Ode' Osbourne	Decision (unanimous) (29–28, 29–28, 29–28)	3	5:00
Women's Bantamweight	Luana Santos	def.	Yana Santos	Decision (unanimous) (29–28, 29–28, 29–28)	3	5:00
Welterweight	Jean-Paul Lebosnoyani	def.	Farman Hasanov	TKO (doctor stoppage)	3	2:11
Preliminary card (Paramount+)
Catchweight (148 lb)	Dakota Hope	def.	Francis Marshall	Decision (split) (28–29, 29–28, 29–28)	3	5:00
Welterweight	Rodrigo Sezinando	def.	Theodor Berggren	TKO (doctor stoppage)	2	5:00
Featherweight	Julian Erosa	def.	Lee Jeong-yeong	KO (punches)	1	1:31
Middleweight	Zachary Reese	def.	Mickey Gall	Decision (unanimous) (29–27, 29–27, 29–27)	3	5:00	(Note: Reese was deducted one point in round 1 due to an eye poke.)
Middleweight	Joseph Kropschot	def.	Nick Klein	Submission (reverse triangle armbar)	2	1:25
Women's Strawweight	Piera Rodríguez	def.	Talita Alencar	Decision (unanimous) (30–27, 30–27, 30–27)	3	5:00
Women's Flyweight	Lucia Szabová	def.	Tainara Lisboa	TKO (punches)	3	3:20

== Bonus awards ==
The following fighters received $100,000 bonuses. The other finishes received $25,000 additional bonuses.

- Fight of the Night: No bonus awarded.
- Performance of the Night: Tom Nolan, Julian Erosa, Joseph Kropschot, and Lucia Szabová

== See also ==
- 2026 in UFC
- List of current UFC fighters
- List of UFC events
