= Gabriel Bonfim =

Brazilian mixed martial artist (born 1997)

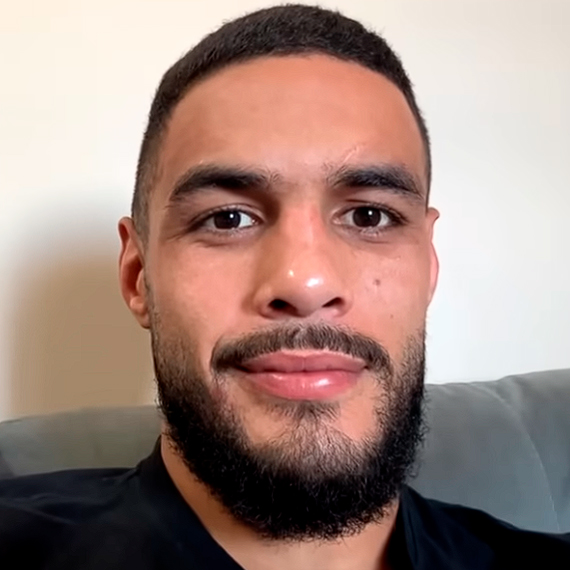
- Bonfim in 2025
- Born: Gabriel de Souza Bonfim; August 20, 1997 (age 29); Brasília, Brazil
- Other names: Marretinha
- Height: 6 ft 1 in (1.85 m)
- Weight: 170 lb (77 kg; 12 st 2 lb)
- Division: Bantamweight (2014); Lightweight (2016–2018); Welterweight (2016–present)
- Reach: 72 in (183 cm)
- Fighting out of: Brasília, Brazil
- Team: Bonfim Brothers Academy
- Years active: 2014–present

Professional boxing record
- Total: 5
- Wins: 5
- By knockout: 1

Mixed martial arts record
- Total: 21
- Wins: 20
- By knockout: 4
- By submission: 13
- By decision: 3
- Losses: 1
- By knockout: 1

Other information
- Notable relatives: Ismael Bonfim (brother)
- Boxing record from BoxRec
- Mixed martial arts record from Sherdog

Gabriel de Souza Bonfim (born August 20, 1997) is a Brazilian mixed martial artist and former boxer. He currently competes in the welterweight division of the Ultimate Fighting Championship. He previously competed in Legacy Fighting Alliance, where he is a former LFA Welterweight Champion. As of August 11, 2026, he is #6 in the Meta UFC welterweight rankings.

== Background ==
Bonfim was born in Brasília, Brazil, into a family of eleven children. His older brother, Ismael Bonfim, is also a professional mixed martial artist who competed in the lightweight division of the UFC. During his childhood, his father struggled with alcoholism and abandoned the family, prompting his older brother and sister to seek employment to financially support the household.

== Mixed martial arts career ==
=== Early career ===
During 2014–2019, Bonfim completing in Brazil regional promotion and turned pro in boxing. He amassed a record of 10–0 in MMA and 5–0 (1 KO) in boxing, before his fighting at Legacy Fighting Alliance.

=== Legacy Fighting Alliance ===
Bonfim joined the one-night of LFA Welterweight Grand Prix at LFA 112 on July 19, 2021. In the semifinal, he knocked Brenner Alberth in round three. Bonfim advance to the final against Carlos Leal, but he was removed from the matchup due to concussion-like symptoms.

Bonfim was scheduled to face Quemuel Ottoni for the vacant LFA Welterweight Championship on March 11, 2022, at LFA 126, but Ottoni withdrew from the bout and was replaced by Eduardo Garvon. Despite as Garvon missed weight at 175.8 pounds and was ineligible for the title, Bonfim won the title via an arm-triangle choke in round one.

=== Dana White's Contender Series ===
Bonfim was invited to face Felix Klinkhammer on September 6, 2022, at Dana White's Contender Series 53, but Klinkhammer withdrew from the bout and was replaced by Trey Waters. He won the fight via a Von Flue choke in round one and he was awarded a UFC contract.

=== Ultimate Fighting Championship ===
In his promotional debut, Bonfim faced Mounir Lazzez on January 21, 2023, at UFC 283. He won the fight via a guillotine choke in round one.

Bonfim faced Trevin Giles on July 29, 2023, at UFC 291. He won the fight via a guillotine choke in round one.

Bonfim faced Nicolas Dalby on November 4, 2023, at UFC Fight Night 231. He lost the fight via technical knockout in round two. This bout was earned him the Fight of the Night bonus.

Bonfim faced Ange Loosa on July 13, 2024, at UFC on ESPN 59. He won the fight via unanimous decision.

Bonfim was scheduled to face Rinat Fakhretdinov on February 15, 2025, at UFC Fight Night 251. However, Fakhretdinov withdrew from the fight due to an undisclosed injury and was replaced by Khaos Williams. He won the fight after he choked Williams unconscious via a brabo choke in round two. This win earned him the Performance of the Night award.

Bonfim faced Stephen Thompson on July 12, 2025, at UFC on ESPN 70. He won the fight via split decision. 12 out of 14 media outlets scored the bout for Thompson.

Bonfim was scheduled to face Randy Brown on October 11, 2025, at UFC Fight Night 261. However, the bout was moved to UFC Fight Night 264 on November 8, 2025, to serve as the main event. He won via technical knockout in the second round. This fight earned him another Performance of the Night award.

Bonfim faced the former UFC Welterweight Champion Belal Muhammad in the main event of UFC Fight Night 278 on June 6, 2026. He won the fight by unanimous decision.

Bonfim was scheduled to face Sean Brady in the main event on November 7, 2026 at UFC Fight Night 293. However, on October 29, the bout was cancelled after Brady withdrew due to a staph infection in his knee. The bout has been re-scheduled and will take place on January 23, 2027 at UFC Fight Night 297 as the main event.

== Championships and accomplishments ==
- Ultimate Fighting Championship
  - Performance of the Night (Two times) vs. Khaos Williams and Randy Brown
  - Fight of the Night (One time) vs. Nicolas Dalby
- Legacy Fighting Alliance
  - LFA Welterweight Championship (One time)
- MMA Fighting
  - 2025 Third Team MMA All-Star

== Mixed martial arts record ==
Professional record breakdown
21 matches	20 wins	1 loss
By knockout	4	1
By submission	13	0
By decision	3	0

Res.	Record	Opponent	Method	Event	Date	Round	Time	Location	Notes
Win	20–1	Belal Muhammad	Decision (unanimous)	UFC Fight Night: Muhammad vs. Bonfim	June 6, 2026	5	5:00	Las Vegas, Nevada, United States	
Win	19–1	Randy Brown	TKO (knee)	UFC Fight Night: Bonfim vs. Brown	November 8, 2025	2	1:40	Las Vegas, Nevada, United States	Performance of the Night.
Win	18–1	Stephen Thompson	Decision (split)	UFC on ESPN: Lewis vs. Teixeira	July 12, 2025	3	5:00	Nashville, Tennessee, United States	
Win	17–1	Khaos Williams	Technical Submission (brabo choke)	UFC Fight Night: Cannonier vs. Rodrigues	February 15, 2025	2	4:58	Las Vegas, Nevada, United States	Performance of the Night.
Win	16–1	Ange Loosa	Decision (unanimous)	UFC on ESPN: Namajunas vs. Cortez	July 13, 2024	3	5:00	Denver, Colorado, United States	
Loss	15–1	Nicolas Dalby	TKO (knees and punches)	UFC Fight Night: Almeida vs. Lewis	November 4, 2023	2	4:33	São Paulo, Brazil	Fight of the Night.
Win	15–0	Trevin Giles	Submission (guillotine choke)	UFC 291	July 29, 2023	1	1:13	Salt Lake City, Utah, United States	
Win	14–0	Mounir Lazzez	Submission (guillotine choke)	UFC 283	January 21, 2023	1	0:49	Rio de Janeiro, Brazil	
Win	13–0	Trey Waters	Submission (Von Flue choke)	Dana White's Contender Series 53	September 6, 2022	1	4:13	Las Vegas, Nevada, United States	
Win	12–0	Eduardo Garvon	Submission (brabo choke)	LFA 126	March 11, 2022	1	1:19	Rio de Janeiro, Brazil	Won the vacant LFA Welterweight Championship; Garvon missed weight (175.8 lb) and was ineligible to win the title.
Win	11–0	Brenner Alberth	KO (punches)	LFA 112	July 19, 2021	3	0:38	Rio de Janeiro, Brazil	LFA Welterweight Grand Prix Semifinal.
Win	10–0	Mario Barreto	Submission (rear-naked choke)	Samurai Fight 2	April 6, 2019	1	3:33	Brasília, Brazil	
Win	9–0	Moacir Rocha	Submission (rear-naked choke)	Future FC 2	February 22, 2019	2	2:30	Indaiatuba, Brazil	
Win	8–0	Alan Pereira	KO (punches)	Lutadors MMA 4	November 17, 2018	1	0:45	Planaltina, Brazil	Return to Welterweight.
Win	7–0	Luis Felipe Alvim	Submission (rear-naked choke)	JF Fight 19	October 20, 2018	3	4:52	Juiz de Fora, Brazil	
Win	6–0	Breno José	Submission (arm-triangle choke)	Socam Fight MMA 1	September 29, 2018	1	4:02	São Sebastião, Brazil	Welterweight bout.
Win	5–0	Samuel Nunes	Submission (guillotine choke)	Samurai Fight 1	September 7, 2018	1	1:03	Brasília, Brazil	
Win	4–0	Vinicius Luiz da Silva	Submission (guillotine choke)	Centro Oeste Fight 8	May 19, 2018	2	3:07	Brasília, Brazil	Welterweight bout.
Win	3–0	Lucas Silva	Submission (rear-naked choke)	Aspera FC 45	June 8, 2016	2	4:05	Brasília, Brazil	Lightweight debut.
Win	2–0	Kleverson Cruz	TKO (punches)	Brazilian MMA League 11	September 10, 2016	2	4:59	Brasília, Brazil	Welterweight debut.
Win	1–0	Kleuve Santos	Submission (triangle choke)	Açaí do Japa Fight 2	December 13, 2014	2	3:20	Paranoá, Brazil	Bantamweight debut.

== Professional boxing record ==
5 fights	5 wins	0 losses
By knockout	1	0
By decision	4	0

No.	Result	Record	Opponent	Type	Round, time	Date	Location	Notes
5	Win	5–0	Ademir de Jesus Machado	TKO	1 (10), 1:48	Dec 16, 2017	Ginásio Poliesportivo São Bartolomeu, São Sebastião, Brazil	Won vacant Brazilian (CNB) super-welterweight title
4	Win	4–0	Claudiomar Pedra dos Santos	UD	6	Mar 18, 2017	Ginásio Poliesportivo São Bartolomeu, São Sebastião, Brazil	
3	Win	3–0	Pablo Luiz Meireles	UD	4	Jan 20, 2017	Ginasio Rebouças, Santos, Brazil	
2	Win	2–0	José Conceição Nascimento	UD	4	May 21, 2016	Combat Club, São Paulo, Brazil	
1	Win	1–0	Paulo Cesar Galdino	UD	4	Feb 27, 2016	Combat Club, São Paulo, Brazil	

== See also ==
- List of current UFC fighters
- List of Dana White's Contender Series alumni
- List of male mixed martial artists
