= Tom Nolan (fighter) =

Australian mixed martial artist (born 2000)

- Born: Thomas Joseph Nolan; 8 March 2000 (age 26); Toowoomba, Queensland, Australia
- Other names: Big Train
- Height: 6 ft 2 in (1.88 m)
- Weight: 155 lb (70 kg; 11 st 1 lb)
- Division: Lightweight
- Reach: 73 in (185 cm)
- Fighting out of: Brisbane, Australia
- Team: Team Compton Training Centre
- Years active: 2020–present

Mixed martial arts record
- Total: 13
- Wins: 12
- By knockout: 6
- By submission: 1
- By decision: 5
- Losses: 1
- By knockout: 1

Other information
- Mixed martial arts record from Sherdog

Thomas Joseph Nolan (born 8 March 2000) is an Australian professional mixed martial artist. He currently competes in the lightweight division of the Ultimate Fighting Championship (UFC). As of 31 October 2026, he is #7 in the Meta UFC lightweight rankings.

== Early life ==
Nolan was born on 8 March 2000, and is from Toowoomba, Queensland, Australia. He grew up playing rugby league, and his brother had tryouts with National Rugby League (NRL) teams. Nolan played for the Toowoomba Clydesdales and was a tearaway backrower. To become a better defender in rugby, he started training in wrestling and jujutsu, later competing in mixed martial arts events. After three MMA fights, Nolan decided at the age of 15 to focus on MMA instead of rugby.

== Mixed martial arts career ==
=== Early career ===
Nolan began his MMA career as an amateur, compiling a record of eight wins and one loss. Trained by Elijah Kennedy and Zac Talbot in Toowoomba, and a member of the Integrated Martial Arts Gym, Nolan was a two-time champion of the XFC Australia promotion and also competed under Eternal MMA during his amateur career. He was also employed by the plumbing business run by his brother, Luke.

Nolan made his professional debut on December 12, 2020, at XFC 46, defeating Sam Flint by unanimous decision. His next fight was at Eternal MMA 63, against Trevor Sinclair, on November 20, 2021. Nolan won by unanimous decision. He followed it by three more wins under the Eternal MMA promotion, all by technical knockout (TKO) and two in the first round.

=== Dana White's Contender Series ===
Nolan competed at Dana White's Contender Series season 7 against Bogdan Grad on August 8, 2023. He won in the first round with a knockout punch and then was awarded the Ultimate Fighting Championship (UFC) contract. Dana White called Nolan a "straight killer" and Paul Felder said his knockout punch against Grad was "one of the most deadly shots I've seen in a long time".

=== Ultimate Fighting Championship ===
Nolan made his UFC debut on January 13, 2024, at UFC Fight Night 234, against Nikolas Motta. He lost the fight for the first time in his career by TKO in the first round.

Nolan faced Victor Martinez on May 18, 2024, at UFC Fight Night 241. He won the fight via technical knockout with through a knee to the body and punches in round one.

Nolan faced Alex Reyes on August 17, 2024, at UFC 305. He won the fight by unanimous decision.

Nolan faced Viacheslav Borshchev on February 9, 2025, at UFC 312. He won the fight via unanimous decision.

Nolan was scheduled to face Evan Elder on September 28, 2025, at UFC Fight Night 260. However, Elder pulled out and was replaced by Charlie Campbell. He won the fight via a rear-naked choke in round one. This fight earned him his first Performance of the Night award.

Nolan faced Farès Ziam on June 6, 2026, at UFC Fight Night 278. He won the fight by unanimous decision.

Nolan faced Renato Moicano on October 31, 2026 in the main event at UFC Fight Night 292. He won the fight by technical knockout in the third round. This fight earned him a $100,000 Performance of the Night award.

== Championships and accomplishments ==
- Ultimate Fighting Championship
  - Performance of the Night (Two times) vs. Charlie Campbell and Renato Moicano

== Mixed martial arts record ==
Professional record breakdown
13 matches	12 wins	1 loss
By knockout	6	1
By submission	1	0
By decision	5	0

Res.	Record	Opponent	Method	Event	Date	Round	Time	Location	Notes
Win	12–1	Renato Moicano	TKO (punches and elbows)	UFC Fight Night: Moicano vs. Nolan	October 31, 2026	3	1:28	Las Vegas, Nevada, United States	Performance of the Night.
Win	11–1	Farès Ziam	Decision (unanimous)	UFC Fight Night: Muhammad vs. Bonfim	June 6, 2026	3	5:00	Las Vegas, Nevada, United States	
Win	10–1	Charlie Campbell	Submission (rear-naked choke)	UFC Fight Night: Ulberg vs. Reyes	September 28, 2025	1	4:08	Perth, Australia	Performance of the Night.
Win	9–1	Viacheslav Borshchev	Decision (unanimous)	UFC 312	February 9, 2025	3	5:00	Sydney, Australia	
Win	8–1	Alex Reyes	Decision (unanimous)	UFC 305	August 17, 2024	3	5:00	Perth, Australia	
Win	7–1	Victor Martinez	TKO (knee to the body and punches)	UFC Fight Night: Barboza vs. Murphy	May 18, 2024	1	3:50	Las Vegas, Nevada, United States	
Loss	6–1	Nikolas Motta	TKO (punches)	UFC Fight Night: Ankalaev vs. Walker 2	January 13, 2024	1	1:03	Las Vegas, Nevada, United States	
Win	6–0	Bogdan Grad	KO (punches)	Dana White's Contender Series 57	August 8, 2023	1	1:23	Las Vegas, Nevada, United States	
Win	5–0	Aidan Aguilera	TKO (knee and punches)	Eternal MMA 74	March 18, 2023	1	2:22	Southport, Australia	
Win	4–0	Adam Cook	TKO (punches)	Eternal MMA 72	December 2, 2022	2	3:58	Gold Coast, Australia	
Win	3–0	Niam Stephen	TKO (punches)	Eternal MMA 67	July 16, 2022	1	3:54	Gold Coast, Australia	
Win	2–0	Trevor Sinclair	Decision (unanimous)	Eternal MMA 63	November 20, 2021	3	5:00	Gold Coast, Australia	
Win	1–0	Sam Flint	Decision (unanimous)	Xtreme FC 46	December 12, 2020	3	5:00	Brisbane, Australia	Lightweight debut.

== See also ==
- List of current UFC fighters
- List of Dana White's Contender Series alumni
- List of male mixed martial artists
