= Mike Malott =

Canadian mixed martial artist (born 1991)

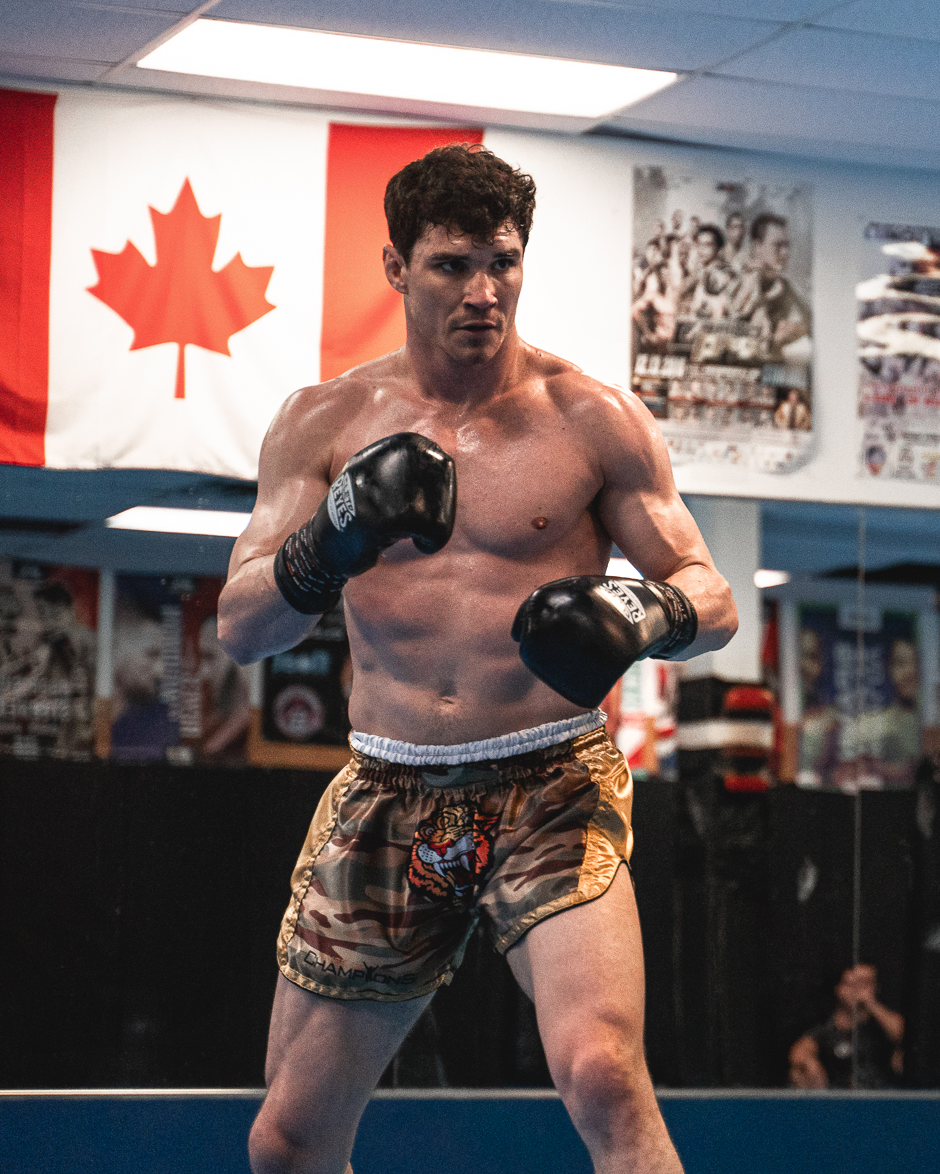
- Mike Malott in 2023
- Born: Michael Malott; November 7, 1991 (age 34); Cleveland, Ohio, U.S.
- Other names: Proper
- Nationality: Canadian
- Height: 6 ft 1 in (1.85 m)
- Weight: 170 lb (77 kg; 12 st 2 lb)
- Division: Welterweight (2020–present); Lightweight (2014–2017); Featherweight (2011–2014)
- Reach: 73 in (185 cm)
- Fighting out of: Burlington, Ontario, Canada
- Team: House of Champions; Niagara Top Team; Ouroboros BJJ
- Rank: Black belt in Brazilian Jiu-Jitsu
- Years active: 2011–present

Mixed martial arts record
- Total: 18
- Wins: 15
- By knockout: 7
- By submission: 6
- By decision: 2
- Losses: 2
- By knockout: 2
- Draws: 1

Other information
- University: Dalhousie University
- Mixed martial arts record from Sherdog

Michael Malott (born November 7, 1991) is an American-born Canadian mixed martial artist who currently competes in the Welterweight division of the Ultimate Fighting Championship (UFC). In the past he has competed for the WSOF, Bellator MMA and Cage Fury Fighting Championships. As of October 17, 2026, he is #8 in the Meta UFC welterweight rankings.

== Mixed martial arts career ==
=== Early career ===
Mike Malott started training at House of Champions in Stoney Creek, Ontario with Kru Alin Halmagean when he was 17 years old.

Malott went to post-secondary education at Dalhousie University in Halifax, Nova Scotia and trained at Titans MMA while on the east coast. During his time at university Malott took his first professional MMA fight at ECC 12: Rage against James Saunders winning by submission in the first round.

After winning his first four professional fights, Malott suffered his first loss against Hakeem Dawodu in 2014 and his following match-up went to a majority draw against Ousmane Thomas Diagne in 2015. Malott took his next bout in 2017 against Craig Shintani for the vacant XFFC Lightweight Championship. He won the bout via knockout in 36 seconds.

Malott took an extended hiatus from competing in mixed martial arts at the end of 2017. Instead, he focused on his grappling skills competing in many BJJ super fights and earning his black belt. At this time he also began coaching striking at Team Alpha Male in Sacramento, California. During his time there he cornered many UFC fighters including Urijah Faber and Cody Garbrandt.

After a three-year hiatus, Malott returned to MMA in December 2020 for Cage Fury 91 in Lancaster, Pennsylvania, United States. He won the bout against Solomon Renfro in the first round.

After his win over Renfro, Malott earned a spot on season 5 of Dana White's Contender Series and was scheduled against Shimon Smotritsky. Malott beat Smotritsky with a guillotine choke submission in the first round and was awarded a UFC contract by Dana White.

=== Ultimate Fighting Championship ===
Malott's promotional debut came against Mickey Gall on April 9, 2022, at UFC 273. Malott won the fight via technical knockout in the first round.

Malott next faced fellow Canadian Yohan Lainesse on February 25, 2023 at UFC Fight Night 220. He won the fight via submission by arm-triangle choke in the first round. The win earned Malott his first Performance of the Night bonus award.

Malott faced Adam Fugitt on June 10, 2023, at UFC 289 in Vancouver, British Columbia. He won the bout via submission in the second round, knocking Fugitt down and submitting him with a guillotine choke. The win also earned Malott his second Performance of the Night bonus award.

Malott faced Neil Magny on January 20, 2024, at UFC 297. After dominating Magny on the ground and landing leg kicks throughout the majority of the fight, Malott lost the fight via technical knockout in round three.

Malott was scheduled to face Gilbert Urbina on July 13, 2024, at UFC on ESPN 59. However, Urbina withdrew from the bout due to undisclosed reasons and Malott decided not to fight another opponent as a result of an injury sustained during training, so the bout was scrapped.

Malott faced Trevin Giles on November 2, 2024 at UFC Fight Night 246. He won the fight by unanimous decision.

Malott faced Charlie Radtke on May 10, 2025 at UFC 315. He won the fight by knockout in the second round.

Malott faced Kevin Holland on October 18, 2025 at UFC Fight Night 262. Despite delivering two inadvertent groin strikes to Holland in the first round, which resulted in a full five-minute timeout, Malott went on to win the bout via unanimous decision.

Malott faced former UFC Welterweight Championship challenger Gilbert Burns in the main event on April 18, 2026, at UFC Fight Night 273. He won the fight by technical knockout in the third round. This fight earned him a $100,000 Performance of the Night award.

Malott faced Joaquin Buckley in the main event on October 17, 2026 at UFC Fight Night 291. He won the fight by knockout in the second round. This fight earned him a $100,000 Performance of the Night award.

== Personal life ==
Malott's younger brother Jeff Malott is a professional hockey player who currently is signed with the Anaheim Ducks organization of the National Hockey League.

== Championships and accomplishments ==
=== Mixed martial arts ===
- Ultimate Fighting Championship
  - Performance of the Night (Four times) vs. Yohan Lainesse, Adam Fugitt, Gilbert Burns and Joaquin Buckley
- Xcessive Force Fighting Championship
  - XFFC Lightweight Champion (One time)

== Mixed martial arts record ==
Professional record breakdown
18 matches	15 wins	2 losses
By knockout	7	2
By submission	6	0
By decision	2	0
Draws	1	

Res.	Record	Opponent	Method	Event	Date	Round	Time	Location	Notes
Win	15–2–1	Joaquin Buckley	KO (knee and punch)	UFC Fight Night: Buckley vs. Malott	October 17, 2026	2	2:32	Edmonton, Alberta, Canada	Performance of the Night.
Win	14–2–1	Gilbert Burns	TKO (punches)	UFC Fight Night: Burns vs. Malott	April 18, 2026	3	2:08	Winnipeg, Manitoba, Canada	Performance of the Night.
Win	13–2–1	Kevin Holland	Decision (unanimous)	UFC Fight Night: de Ridder vs. Allen	October 18, 2025	3	5:00	Vancouver, British Columbia, Canada	
Win	12–2–1	Charles Radtke	KO (punches)	UFC 315	May 10, 2025	2	0:26	Montreal, Quebec, Canada	
Win	11–2–1	Trevin Giles	Decision (unanimous)	UFC Fight Night: Moreno vs. Albazi	November 2, 2024	3	5:00	Edmonton, Alberta, Canada	
Loss	10–2–1	Neil Magny	TKO (punches)	UFC 297	January 20, 2024	3	4:45	Toronto, Ontario, Canada	
Win	10–1–1	Adam Fugitt	Submission (guillotine choke)	UFC 289	June 10, 2023	2	1:06	Vancouver, British Columbia, Canada	Performance of the Night.
Win	9–1–1	Yohan Lainesse	Submission (arm-triangle choke)	UFC Fight Night: Muniz vs. Allen	February 25, 2023	1	4:15	Las Vegas, Nevada, United States	Performance of the Night.
Win	8–1–1	Mickey Gall	TKO (punches)	UFC 273	April 9, 2022	1	3:41	Jacksonville, Florida, United States	
Win	7–1–1	Shimon Smotritsky	Submission (guillotine choke)	Dana White's Contender Series 42	October 5, 2021	1	0:39	Las Vegas, Nevada, United States	
Win	6–1–1	Solomon Renfro	Submission (rear-naked choke)	Cage Fury FC 91	December 18, 2020	1	1:42	Lancaster, Pennsylvania, United States	Welterweight debut.
Win	5–1–1	Craig Shintani	KO (punches)	Xcessive Force FC 13	February 3, 2017	1	0:36	Grande Prairie, Alberta, Canada	Won the vacant XFFC Lightweight Championship.
Draw	4–1–1	Ousmane Thomas Diagne	Draw (majority)	Bellator 142: Dynamite	September 15, 2015	3	5:00	San Jose, California, United States	
Loss	4–1	Hakeem Dawodu	TKO (punches and elbows)	WSOF 14	October 11, 2014	1	4:13	Edmonton, Alberta, Canada	Return to Featherweight; Malott missed weight (147.3 lb).
Win	4–0	Allan Wilson	KO (knee and punches)	Substance Cage Combat 2.0	May 30, 2014	1	1:29	Toronto, Ontario, Canada	Lightweight debut.
Win	3–0	Jon Williams	TKO (knee)	Extreme Cage Combat 16	March 9, 2013	1	0:15	Halifax, Nova Scotia, Canada	
Win	2–0	Michael Imperato	Submission (armbar)	East Coast FP: Resurgence	May 27, 2011	1	2:00	Trenton, Nova Scotia, Canada	
Win	1–0	James Saunders	Submission (armbar)	Extreme Cage Combat 12	April 16, 2011	1	0:32	Halifax, Nova Scotia, Canada	Featherweight debut.

== See also ==
- List of current UFC fighters
- List of Dana White's Contender Series alumni
- List of male mixed martial artists
