= UFC 307 =

Mixed martial arts event in 2024

UFC 307: Pereira vs. Rountree Jr.
- The poster for UFC 307: Pereira vs. Rountree Jr.
- Promotion: Ultimate Fighting Championship
- Date: October 5, 2024
- Venue: Delta Center
- City: Salt Lake City, Utah, United States
- Attendance: 17,487
- Total gate: $5,005,643

Event chronology
UFC Fight Night: Moicano vs. Saint Denis	UFC 307: Pereira vs. Rountree Jr.	UFC Fight Night: Royval vs. Taira

UFC 307: Pereira vs. Rountree Jr. was a mixed martial arts event produced by the Ultimate Fighting Championship that took place on October 5, 2024, at the Delta Center in Salt Lake City, Utah, United States.

== Background ==
The event marked the promotion's fourth visit to Salt Lake City and first since UFC 291 in July 2023.

A UFC Light Heavyweight Championship bout between current champion (also former UFC Middleweight Champion and former Glory Middleweight and Light Heavyweight Champion) Alex Pereira and Khalil Rountree Jr. headlined the event.

A UFC Women's Bantamweight Championship bout between current champion Raquel Pennington and former champion (also The Ultimate Fighter: Team Rousey vs. Team Tate bantamweight winner) Julianna Peña served as the co-main event.

A middleweight bout between Kevin Holland and Chris Curtis was scheduled for this event. However, Curtis withdrew from the fight due to a foot fracture and was replaced by Roman Dolidze.

A light heavyweight bout between former interim UFC Light Heavyweight Championship challenger Ovince Saint Preux and former LFA Light Heavyweight Champion Ryan Spann was initially scheduled for UFC Fight Night: Burns vs. Brady. However, on the week of the event, Saint Preux withdrew from the fight due to an illness, so the bout was moved to this event as a result.

A lightweight bout between Nate Landwehr and former LFA Lightweight Champion Austin Hubbard was reportedly scheduled for this event. However, Landwehr withdrew from the bout for unknown reasons and was replaced by Alexander Hernandez on short notice.

A featherweight bout between former UFC Bantamweight Champion Aljamain Sterling and Movsar Evloev was scheduled for this event. However, Sterling withdrew from the fight due to an injury sustained in sparring and the bout was scrapped. The pairing was eventually rescheduled for UFC 310.

Mauricio Ruffy was expected to participate in a lightweight bout at the event, but the promotion wasn't able to find an opponent and he was pulled from the card.

== Results ==
Main card
Weight class				Method	Round	Time	Notes
Light Heavyweight	Alex Pereira (c)	def.	Khalil Rountree Jr.	TKO (punches)	4	4:32	(Note: For the UFC Light Heavyweight Championship.)
Women's Bantamweight	Julianna Peña	def.	Raquel Pennington (c)	Decision (split) (48–47, 47–48, 48–47)	5	5:00	(Note: For the UFC Women's Bantamweight Championship.)
Bantamweight	Mario Bautista	def.	José Aldo	Decision (split) (28–29, 29–28, 29–28)	3	5:00
Middleweight	Roman Dolidze	def.	Kevin Holland	TKO (corner stoppage)	1	5:00
Women's Bantamweight	Kayla Harrison	def.	Ketlen Vieira	Decision (unanimous) (30–27, 30–27, 29–28)	3	5:00
Preliminary card (ESPNews / ESPN+)
Welterweight	Joaquin Buckley	def.	Stephen Thompson	KO (punch)	3	2:17
Women's Strawweight	Iasmin Lucindo	def.	Marina Rodriguez	Decision (split) (29–28, 28–29, 29–28)	3	5:00
Lightweight	Alexander Hernandez	def.	Austin Hubbard	Decision (split) (27–30, 29–28, 29–28)	3	5:00
Middleweight	César Almeida	def.	Ihor Potieria	Decision (unanimous) (30–27, 30–27, 30–27)	3	5:00
Early preliminary card (ESPN+ / UFC Fight Pass)
Light Heavyweight	Ryan Spann	def.	Ovince Saint Preux	Submission (guillotine choke)	1	1:35
Women's Strawweight	Tecia Pennington	def.	Carla Esparza	Decision (unanimous) (29–28, 29–28, 30–27)	3	5:00
Welterweight	Court McGee	def.	Tim Means	Submission (neck crank)	1	3:19

== Bonus awards ==
The following fighters received $50,000 bonuses.

- Fight of the Night: Alex Pereira vs. Khalil Rountree Jr.
- Performance of the Night: Joaquin Buckley and Ryan Spann

== See also ==
- 2024 in UFC
- List of current UFC fighters
- List of UFC events
