= UFC Fight Night: Bonfim vs. Brady =

Mixed martial arts event in 2027

- Promotion: Ultimate Fighting Championship
- Date: January 23, 2027
- Venue: Meta Apex
- City: Enterprise, Nevada, United States

Event chronology
UFC Fight Night: Rodríguez vs. Garcia	UFC Fight Night: Bonfim vs. Brady	UFC 336: Van vs. Kape

UFC Fight Night: Bonfim vs. Brady (also known as UFC Fight Night 297 and UFC Vegas 125) is an upcoming mixed martial arts event produced by the Ultimate Fighting Championship that is scheduled to take place on January 23, 2027, at the Meta Apex in Enterprise, Nevada, part of the Las Vegas Valley, United States.

== Background ==
A welterweight bout between former LFA Welterweight Champion Gabriel Bonfim and Sean Brady is scheduled to headline the event. They were originally scheduled to headline UFC Fight Night: Cortes-Acosta vs. Walker in November 2026, but Brady had to withdraw due to a staph infection in his knee, resulting in the cancellation of the bout.

== Fight card ==
Fight card (Paramount+)
Weight class				Method	Round	Time	Notes
Welterweight	Gabriel Bonfim	vs.	Sean Brady

== Announced bouts ==
- Featherweight bout: Pat Sabatini vs. Vinicius Oliveira
- Featherweight bout: Yadier del Valle vs. Ezra Elliott

== See also ==
- 2027 in UFC
- List of UFC events
- List of current UFC fighters
