= UFC 291 =

Mixed martial arts event in 2023

UFC 291: Poirier vs. Gaethje 2
- The poster for UFC 291: Poirier vs. Gaethje 2
- Promotion: Ultimate Fighting Championship
- Date: July 29, 2023
- Venue: Delta Center
- City: Salt Lake City, Utah, United States
- Attendance: 18,467
- Total gate: $6,556,443.97

Event chronology
UFC Fight Night: Aspinall vs. Tybura	UFC 291: Poirier vs. Gaethje 2	UFC on ESPN: Sandhagen vs. Font

UFC 291: Poirier vs. Gaethje 2 was a mixed martial arts event produced by the Ultimate Fighting Championship that took place on July 29, 2023, at the Delta Center in Salt Lake City, Utah, United States.

== Background ==
The event marked the promotion's third visit to Salt Lake City and first since UFC 278 in August 2022.

A lightweight rematch between former interim UFC Lightweight Champions Dustin Poirier and Justin Gaethje (also former WSOF Lightweight Champion) headlined the event. They also competed for the symbolic "BMF" (baddest motherfucker) title, which was vacated after the original holder Jorge Masvidal retired in April. The pairing first met at UFC on Fox: Poirier vs. Gaethje in April 2018 which Poirier won by fourth-round TKO. The fight was considered "Fight of the Year" by several media channels.

A welterweight bout between former UFC Welterweight Championship challenger Stephen Thompson and Michel Pereira was expected to take place at UFC 289, but contracts were never signed and the bout was rescheduled for this event instead. At the weigh-ins, Pereira weighed in at 174 pounds, three pounds over the welterweight non-title fight limit. As a result, the bout was scrapped.

Matthew Semelsberger and Yohan Lainesse were scheduled to meet in a welterweight bout at the event. However on July 10, Lainesse was removed from the event for undisclosed reasons and replaced by Uroš Medić.

Joanne Wood was expected to face Priscila Cachoeira in a women's flyweight bout on the preliminary card. However, Wood pulled out in mid-July due to undisclosed reasons and was replaced by Miranda Maverick.

A welterweight matchup between Jake Matthews and Miguel Baeza was booked for this event. However on July 19, Baeza pulled out due to an undisclosed reason. He was replaced by promotional newcomer Darrius Flowers.

Former UFC Middleweight Championship challenger Paulo Costa and Ikram Aliskerov were expected to meet at the event. However, the promotion opted to scrap the pairing and instead move them to UFC 294 in October matching them up with Khamzat Chimaev and Nassourdine Imavov, respectively.

At the weigh-ins, Vinicius Salvador weighed in at 128.5 pounds, two and a half pounds over the flyweight non-title fight limit. His bout proceeded at catchweight and he was fined 20 percent of his purse, which went to his opponent C.J. Vergara.

== Results ==
Main card
Weight class				Method	Round	Time	Notes
Lightweight	Justin Gaethje	def.	Dustin Poirier	KO (head kick)	2	1:00	(Note: For the vacant symbolic UFC "BMF" belt)
Light Heavyweight	Alex Pereira	def.	Jan Błachowicz	Decision (split) (29–28, 28–29, 29–28)	3	5:00
Heavyweight	Derrick Lewis	def.	Marcos Rogério de Lima	TKO (punches)	1	0:33
Lightweight	Bobby Green	def.	Tony Ferguson	Technical Submission (arm-triangle choke)	3	4:54
Welterweight	Kevin Holland	def.	Michael Chiesa	Submission (brabo choke)	1	2:39
Preliminary card (ABC / ESPN / ESPN+)
Welterweight	Gabriel Bonfim	def.	Trevin Giles	Submission (guillotine choke)	1	1:13
Catchweight (128.5 lb)	C.J. Vergara	def.	Vinicius Salvador	Decision (unanimous) (29–28, 29–28, 29–28)	3	5:00
Middleweight	Roman Kopylov	def.	Claudio Ribeiro	KO (head kick)	2	0:33
Welterweight	Jake Matthews	def.	Darrius Flowers	Submission (rear-naked choke)	2	2:37
Early preliminary card (ESPN / ESPN+ / UFC Fight Pass)
Welterweight	Uroš Medić	def.	Matthew Semelsberger	TKO (spinning backfist and punches)	3	2:36
Women's Flyweight	Miranda Maverick	def.	Priscila Cachoeira	Submission (armbar)	3	2:11

== Bonus awards ==
The following fighters received $50,000 bonuses.

- Fight of the Night: No bonus awarded.
- Performance of the Night: Justin Gaethje, Derrick Lewis, Bobby Green, and Kevin Holland

== Reported payout ==
The following is the limited reported payout to the athletes as reported to the Pete Suazo Utah Athletic Commission. The athletes were able to choose whether or not they wanted to disclose their purse to the public. It does not include sponsor money or "locker room" bonuses often given by the UFC.

- Kevin Holland: $356,000 (includes $178,000 win bonus) def. Michael Chiesa
- Bobby Green: $300,000 (includes $150,000 win bonus) def. Tony Ferguson
- CJ Vergara: $60,000 (includes $30,000 win bonus) def. Vinicius Salvador
- Gabriel Bonfim: $24,000 (includes $12,000 win bonus) def. Trevin Giles

== See also ==
- List of UFC events
- List of current UFC fighters
- 2023 in UFC
