= UFC Fight Night: Buckley vs. Malott =

Mixed martial arts event in 2026

- The poster for UFC Fight Night: Buckley vs. Malott
- Promotion: Ultimate Fighting Championship
- Date: October 17, 2026
- Venue: Rogers Place
- City: Edmonton, Alberta, Canada
- Attendance: 16,903
- Total gate: $2,206,902

Event chronology
UFC Fight Night: Allen vs. Duncan	UFC Fight Night: Buckley vs. Malott	UFC 333: Volkanovski vs. Evloev

UFC Fight Night: Buckley vs. Malott (also known as UFC Fight Night 291) was a mixed martial arts event produced by the Ultimate Fighting Championship that took place on October 17, 2026, at Rogers Place in Edmonton, Alberta, Canada.

== Background ==
The event marked the promotion's fourth visit to Edmonton and first since UFC Fight Night: Moreno vs. Albazi in November 2024.

A welterweight bout between Joaquin Buckley and Mike Malott headlined the event.

A women's flyweight bout between Erin Blanchfield and Jasmine Jasudavicius served as the co-main event. They were initially scheduled to compete at UFC 330 in August, but Blanchfield withdrew due to an injury.

A women's flyweight bout between former UFC Women's Flyweight Championship challenger Katlyn Cerminara and former LFA Women's Flyweight Champion Jamey-Lyn Horth was scheduled for the event. However, Horth had to withdraw due to an injury and was replaced by promotional newcomer Mackenzie Stiller.

A heavyweight bout between promotional newcomer Javad Mahjoub and Louie Sutherland was originally scheduled at the event, but Sutherland pulled out and was replaced by fellow promotional newcomer Joel Faglier.

In addition, a middleweight bout between Julien Leblanc and Gilbert Urbina was scheduled for the event. However, Urbina withdrew for undisclosed reasons and was replaced by promotional newcomer Nick Galanti.

== Results ==
Main card (Paramount+)
Weight class				Method	Round	Time	Notes
Welterweight	Mike Malott	def.	Joaquin Buckley	KO (knee and punch)	2	2:32
Women's Flyweight	Jasmine Jasudavicius	def.	Erin Blanchfield	Decision (unanimous) (29–28, 29–28, 29–28)	3	5:00
Lightweight	Cristian Pérez	def.	Kyle Nelson	KO (punches)	1	0:27
Middleweight	Marc-André Barriault	def.	Kyle Daukaus	TKO (punches and elbows)	1	4:28
Bantamweight	Timothy Cuamba	def.	Louis Jourdain	Submission (neck crank)	2	2:48
Lightweight	Mandel Nallo	def.	Nate Landwehr	TKO (leg kick and punches)	2	0:47
Preliminary card (Paramount+)
Heavyweight	Tanner Boser	def.	Jhonata Diniz	TKO (punches)	3	4:26
Middleweight	Nick Galanti	def.	Julien Leblanc	Submission (neck crank)	1	1:26
Heavyweight	Joel Faglier	def.	Javad Mahjoub	TKO (punches)	2	2:11
Women's Flyweight	Katlyn Cerminara	def.	Mackenzie Stiller	TKO (head kick and punches)	1	4:46
Bantamweight	Steven Koslow	def.	Chad Anheliger	Submission (rear-naked choke)	3	4:31
Women's Bantamweight	Chelsea Chandler	def.	Melissa Croden	Submission (kimura)	1	4:52
Bantamweight	You Su-young	def.	Cody Chovancek	Submission (kimura)	3	4:19

== Bonus awards ==
The following fighters received $100,000 bonuses. The other finishes received $25,000 additional bonuses.

- Fight of the Night: No bonus awarded.
- Performance of the Night: Mike Malott, Marc-André Barriault, Mandel Nallo, and Joel Faglier

== Records set ==
The event ties UFC Fight Night: Medić vs. Rodriguez for most finishes in a modern UFC event with twelve.

It also featured 11 consecutive stoppage results, tying UFC Fight Night: Rockhold vs. Bisping (November 2014) for the single-event record in UFC history.

== See also ==
- 2026 in UFC
- List of current UFC fighters
- List of UFC events
