= UFC Fight Night: Medić vs. Rodriguez =

Mixed martial arts event in 2026

- The poster for UFC Fight Night: Medić vs. Rodriguez
- Promotion: Ultimate Fighting Championship
- Date: August 1, 2026
- Venue: Belgrade Arena
- City: Belgrade, Serbia
- Attendance: 18,623
- Total gate: $2,490,023

Event chronology
UFC Fight Night: Ankalaev vs. Guskov	UFC Fight Night: Medić vs. Rodriguez	UFC Fight Night: Gamrot vs. Salkilld

UFC Fight Night: Medić vs. Rodriguez (also known as UFC Fight Night 283) was a mixed martial arts event produced by the Ultimate Fighting Championship that took place on August 1, 2026, at the Belgrade Arena in Belgrade, Serbia.

== Background ==
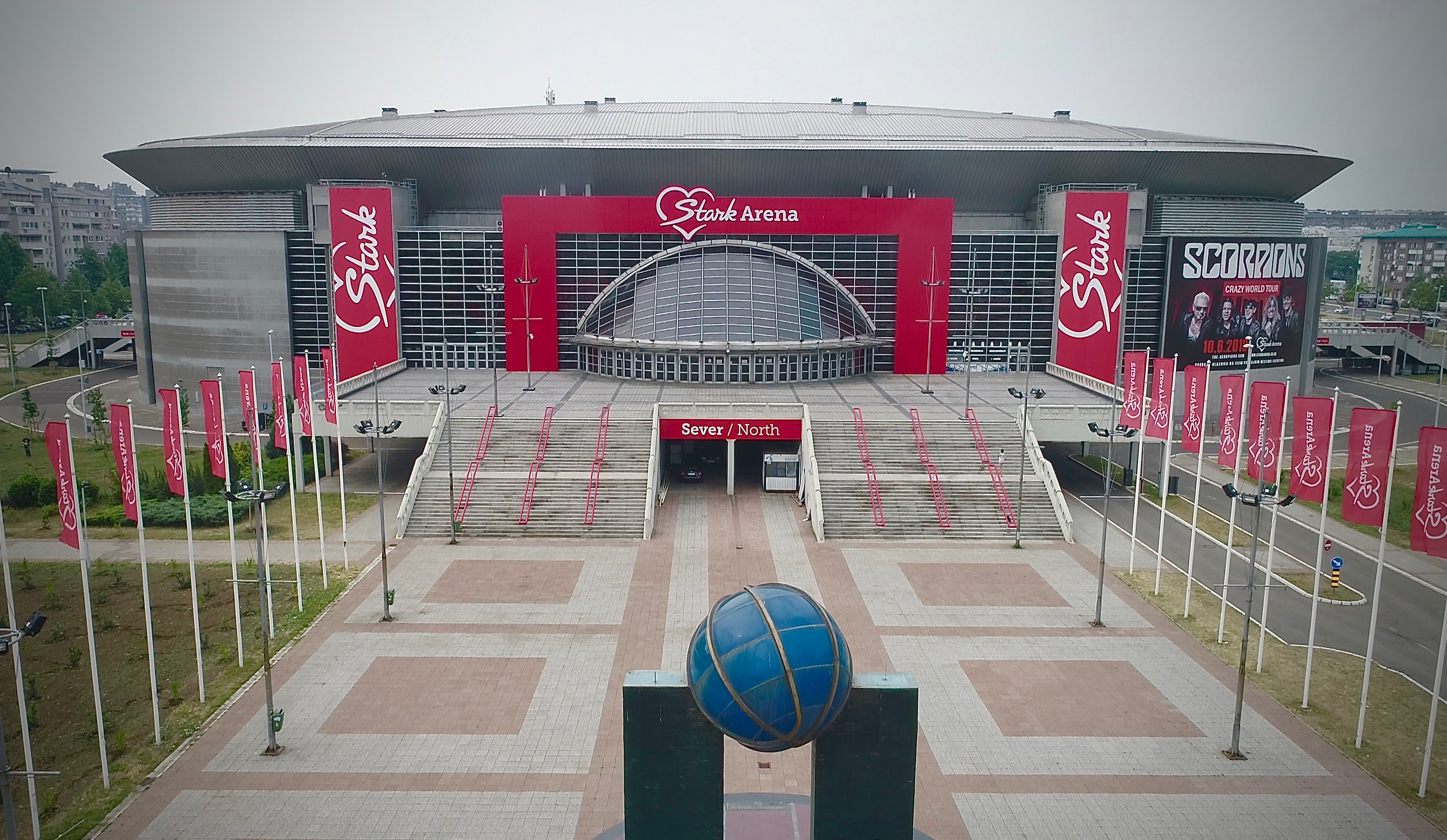
The Belgrade Arena hosted the promotion's debut in Serbia, which became the 33rd country to hold a UFC event.

A welterweight bout between Uroš Medić and Daniel Rodriguez headlined the event.

A light heavyweight rematch between former KSW and UFC Light Heavyweight Champion Jan Błachowicz and Bogdan Guskov was scheduled to take place at the event. However, on July 13, Guskov was moved to headline the previous week's event, UFC Fight Night: Ankalaev vs. Guskov, after Khalil Rountree Jr. withdrew due to injury, resulting in Błachowicz facing Navajo Stirling instead. The rematch between Błachowicz and Guskov was originally scheduled for UFC 328 in May 2026, but Błachowicz withdrew due to a torn meniscus, so the pairing was scrapped. The pair previously fought at UFC 323 in December 2025, where their bout ended in a majority draw after being moved from UFC Fight Night: Tsarukyan vs. Hooker for undisclosed reasons.

A heavyweight bout between 2022 PFL Heavyweight Tournament winner Ante Delija and Johnny Walker (who's moving up a weight class) was expected to take place at the event. However, Delija pulled out due to injury and after a replacement was unsuccessfully sought, the bout was cancelled.

Jovan Leka and Max Gimenis were expected to meet in a heavyweight bout at the preliminary card. However, Gimenis pulled due to injury and was replaced by promotional newcomer Alexander Poppeck.

Mark Vologdin was scheduled to face Josias Musasa in a bantamweight bout at this event. However, Musasa withdrew from the event for unknown reasons and was replaced by promotional newcomer Borislav Nikolić.

== Results ==
Main card (Paramount+)
Weight class				Method	Round	Time	Notes
Welterweight	Uroš Medić	def.	Daniel Rodriguez	TKO (punches)	1	0:30
Light Heavyweight	Navajo Stirling	def.	Jan Błachowicz	TKO (elbows and punches)	1	2:56
Heavyweight	Aleksandar Rakić	def.	Marcin Tybura	Decision (unanimous) (30–27, 30–27, 30–27)	3	5:00
Middleweight	Robert Valentin	def.	Duško Todorović	Submission (guillotine choke)	1	4:14
Middleweight	Gilbert Urbina	def.	Vlasto Čepo	TKO (punches and elbows)	1	1:01
Lightweight	Noah Gugnon	def.	Miloš Janičić	Submission (rear-naked choke)	1	1:21
Preliminary card (Paramount+)
Lightweight	Tofiq Musayev	def.	Ľudovít Klein	TKO (punches)	2	4:07
Welterweight	Michael Oliveira	def.	Oban Elliott	TKO (punches)	1	1:49
Bantamweight	Borislav Nikolić	def.	Mark Vologdin	Decision (unanimous) (29–27, 29–27, 29–27)	3	5:00
Featherweight	Bogdan Grad	def.	Dennis Buzukja	Submission (arm-triangle choke)	2	4:33
Lightweight	Mateusz Rębecki	def.	Kyle Prepolec	TKO (punches)	1	4:41
Women's Bantamweight	Nina Nikolija Milošević	def.	Hailey Cowan	TKO (punch to the body)	1	3:41
Heavyweight	Jovan Leka	def.	Alexander Poppeck	TKO (body kick and punches)	1	2:22
Women's Strawweight	Stephanie Luciano	def.	Marina Spasić	Submission (rear-naked choke)	1	3:20

== Bonus awards ==
The following fighters received $100,000 bonuses. The other finishes received $25,000 additional bonuses.

- Fight of the Night: No bonus awarded.
- Performance of the Night: Uroš Medić, Navajo Stirling, Gilbert Urbina, and Nina Nikolija Milošević

== Records set ==
The event broke the modern UFC record for most first-round finishes, recording ten and surpassing the eight set one month earlier at UFC 329.

In addition, the event recorded twelve finishes, surpassing the previous modern UFC record of eleven shared by UFC Fight Night: Rockhold vs. Bisping, UFC 224, UFC 281, UFC Fight Night: Imavov vs. Borralho, UFC 329 and later UFC 332. The record was later tied by UFC Fight Night: Buckley vs. Malott in October 2026.

== See also ==
- 2026 in UFC
- List of current UFC fighters
- List of UFC events
