= UFC 333 =

Mixed martial arts event in 2026

UFC 333: Volkanovski vs. Evloev
- The poster for UFC 333: Volkanovski vs. Evloev
- Promotion: Ultimate Fighting Championship
- Date: October 24, 2026
- Venue: Etihad Arena
- City: Abu Dhabi, United Arab Emirates
- Attendance: Not announced

Event chronology
UFC Fight Night: Buckley vs. Malott	UFC 333: Volkanovski vs. Evloev	UFC Fight Night: Moicano vs. Nolan

UFC 333: Volkanovski vs. Evloev was a mixed martial arts event produced by the Ultimate Fighting Championship that took place on October 24, 2026, at the Etihad Arena in Abu Dhabi, United Arab Emirates.

== Background ==
The event marked the promotion's 24th visit to Abu Dhabi and its first since UFC Fight Night: Ankalaev vs. Guskov in July 2026. It was also the eleventh numbered event held in the city, following UFC 321 in 12th October 2025.

A UFC Featherweight Championship bout between reigning two-time champion Alexander Volkanovski and undefeated contender Movsar Evloev headlined the event.

A UFC Bantamweight Championship trilogy bout between reigning two-time champion Petr Yan and former champion Merab Dvalishvili took place as the co-main event. The pair first met in March 2023 at UFC Fight Night: Yan vs. Dvalishvili, where Dvalishvili defeated Yan via unanimous decision. Their second meeting took place in December 2025 at UFC 323, where Yan defeated Dvalishvili to reclaim the bantamweight title, ending the latter's 14-fight winning streak at the time.

A featherweight bout between Arnold Allen and Aaron Pico was scheduled for the event. However, Allen withdrew due to an injury and was replaced by Losene Keita.

At the weigh-ins, Nicolle Caliari weighed in at 120.5 pounds, four and a half pounds over the women's strawweight non-title fight limit. Her bout proceeded at catchweight and she was fined 30 percent of her purse, which went to her opponent Iasmin Lucindo.

== Results ==
Main card (Paramount+)
Weight class				Method	Round	Time	Notes
Featherweight	Alexander Volkanovski (c)	def.	Movsar Evloev	TKO (punches)	2	4:54	(Note: For the UFC Featherweight Championship.)
Bantamweight	Petr Yan (c)	def.	Merab Dvalishvili	Decision (unanimous) (48–47, 48–47, 48–47)	5	5:00	(Note: For the UFC Bantamweight Championship.)
Flyweight	Lone'er Kavanagh	def.	Ramazan Temirov	TKO (punches)	1	4:28
Heavyweight	Alexander Volkov	def.	Rizvan Kuniev	Decision (unanimous) (29–28, 30–27, 30–27)	3	5:00
Featherweight	Aaron Pico	def.	Losene Keita	TKO (punches)	1	1:14
Preliminary card (Paramount+)
Light Heavyweight	Dominick Reyes	def.	Azamat Murzakanov	TKO (head kick and punches)	1	2:40
Light Heavyweight	Abdul-Rakhman Yakhyaev	def.	Nikita Krylov	TKO (knee and punches)	1	2:38
Middleweight	Abusupiyan Magomedov	def.	Cameron Rowston	Technical Submission (guillotine choke)	1	1:44
Lightweight	Grant Dawson	def.	Nurullo Aliev	Decision (unanimous) (29–27, 29–27, 29–27)	3	5:00	(Note: Aliev was deducted one point in round 1 due to illegal strikes to the back of the head.)
Early preliminary card (Paramount+)
Bantamweight	Colby Thicknesse	def.	Asaf Chopurov	Decision (split) (28–29, 29–28, 29–28)	3	5:00
Middleweight	Abubakar Vagaev	def.	Jacob Malkoun	Decision (unanimous) (29–28, 29–28, 29–28)	3	5:00
Featherweight	Daniel Santos	def.	Bolaji Oki	Decision (unanimous) (29–28, 29–28, 29–28)	3	5:00
Lightweight	Kody Steele	def.	Noah Gugnon	KO (punches)	1	3:54
Catchweight (120.5 lb)	Iasmin Lucindo	def.	Nicolle Caliari	Decision (unanimous) (30–27, 30–27, 30–27)	3	5:00

== Bonus awards ==
The following fighters received bonuses: $100,000. The other finishes received $25,000 additional bonuses.

- Fight of the Night: Petr Yan vs. Merab Dvalishvili
- Performance of the Night: Alexander Volkanovski and Lone'er Kavanagh

== See also ==
- 2026 in UFC
- List of current UFC fighters
- List of UFC events
