= UFC Fight Night: Hernandez vs. Rodrigues =

Mixed martial arts event in 2026

- The poster for UFC Fight Night: Hernandez vs. Rodrigues
- Promotion: Ultimate Fighting Championship
- Date: August 22, 2026
- Venue: Golden 1 Center
- City: Sacramento, California, United States
- Attendance: 16,867
- Total gate: $3,300,000

Event chronology
UFC 330: Makhachev vs. Machado Garry	UFC Fight Night: Hernandez vs. Rodrigues	UFC Fight Night: Nurmagomedov vs. Song

UFC Fight Night: Hernandez vs. Rodrigues (also known as UFC Fight Night 285) was a mixed martial arts event produced by the Ultimate Fighting Championship that took place on August 22, 2026, at the Golden 1 Center in Sacramento, California, United States.

== Background ==
The event marked the promotion's seventh visit to Sacramento and first since UFC Fight Night: de Randamie vs. Ladd in July 2019. There were initial reports that the event would take place at the Meta Apex in Las Vegas, Nevada, but for undisclosed reasons, it was later shifted to Sacramento.

A middleweight bout between former LFA Middleweight Champions Anthony Hernandez and Gregory Rodrigues headlined the event.

A featherweight bout between Danny Silva and Márcio Barbosa was scheduled for the event. However, Silva withdrew due to being hospitalized by sudden pulmonary embolism. As a result, Barbosa competed at this event against promotional newcomer Ryan Kuse instead.

A lightweight bout between Kody Steele and Gauge Young was scheduled for this event. However, Steele withdrew from the fight for unknown reasons and was replaced by promotional newcomer Stanley Dorsainvil.

== Results ==
Main card (Paramount+)
Weight class				Method	Round	Time	Notes
Middleweight	Gregory Rodrigues	def.	Anthony Hernandez	Decision (unanimous) (48–47, 49–46, 48–47)	5	5:00
Heavyweight	Vitor Petrino	def.	Serghei Spivac	Decision (unanimous) (30–27, 30–27, 30–27)	3	5:00
Light Heavyweight	Reinier de Ridder	def.	Roman Dolidze	TKO (punches)	1	4:01
Lightweight	MarQuel Mederos	def.	Mason Jones	TKO (elbows and punches)	2	2:07
Women's Flyweight	Carli Judice	def.	Jeisla Chaves	TKO (front kick to the body and punches)	1	1:39
Heavyweight	Anthony Wint	def.	Terrance Chatman	Technical Submission (arm-triangle choke)	1	4:29
Preliminary card (Paramount+)
Featherweight	Jamall Emmers	def.	Lerryan Douglas	TKO (punches)	1	3:38
Heavyweight	Shamil Gaziev	def.	Kennedy Nzechukwu	KO (punch)	1	1:20
Lightweight	Chris Padilla	def.	Nasrat Haqparast	Technical Submission (arm-triangle choke)	3	4:59
Featherweight	Márcio Barbosa	def.	Ryan Kuse	TKO (punch)	1	2:47
Lightweight	Stanley Dorsainvil	def.	Gauge Young	Decision (unanimous) (29–28, 29–28, 29–28)	3	5:00
Middleweight	Jackson McVey	def.	Wesley Schultz	TKO (knee to the body and punches)	1	4:13
Women's Strawweight	Shanelle Dyer	def.	Elise Reed	TKO (punches)	3	1:42

== Bonus awards ==
The following fighters received $100,000 bonuses. The other finishes received $25,000 additional bonuses.

- Fight of the Night: Gregory Rodrigues vs. Anthony Hernandez
- Performance of the Night: MarQuel Mederos and Carli Judice

== Reported payout ==
The following is the reported payout to the fighters as reported by the California State Athletic Commission. The amounts do not include sponsor money, discretionary bonuses, viewership points, or additional earnings.

- Gregory Rodrigues: $340,000 (includes $170,000 win bonus) def. Anthony Hernandez: $170,000
- Vitor Petrino: $200,000 (includes $100,000 win bonus) def. Serghei Spivak: $125,000
- Reinier de Ridder: $300,000 (includes $150,000 win bonus) def. Roman Dolidze: $180,000
- MarQuel Medeiros: $48,000 (includes $24,000 win bonus) def. Mason Jones: $33,000
- Carli Judice: $56,000 (includes $28,000 win bonus) def. Jeisla Chaves: $12,000
- Anthony Wint: $20,000 (includes $10,000 win bonus) def. Terrance Chatman: $12,000
- Jamall Emmers: $126,000 (includes $63,000 win bonus) def. Lerryan Douglas: $12,000
- Shamil Gaziev: $100,000 (includes $50,000 win bonus) def. Kennedy Nzechukwu: $105,000
- Chris Padilla: $78,000 (includes $39,000 win bonus) def. Nasrat Haqparast: $90,000
- Márcio Barbosa: $24,000 (includes $12,000 win bonus) def. Ryan Kuse: $12,000
- Stan Dorsainvil: $24,000 (includes $12,000 win bonus) def. Gauge Young: $16,000
- Jackson McVey: $50,000 (includes $25,000 win bonus) def. Wes Schultz: $12,000
- Shanelle Dyer: $24,000 (includes $12,000 win bonus) def. Elise Reed: $35,000

== See also ==
- 2026 in UFC
- List of current UFC fighters
- List of UFC events
