= UFC Fight Night: Gamrot vs. Salkilld =

Mixed martial arts event in 2026

- The poster for UFC Fight Night: Gamrot vs. Salkilld
- Promotion: Ultimate Fighting Championship
- Date: August 8, 2026
- Venue: Meta Apex
- City: Enterprise, Nevada, United States
- Attendance: Not announced

Event chronology
UFC Fight Night: Medić vs. Rodriguez	UFC Fight Night: Gamrot vs. Salkilld	UFC 330: Makhachev vs. Machado Garry

UFC Fight Night: Gamrot vs. Salkilld (also known as UFC Fight Night 284 and UFC Vegas 120) was a mixed martial arts event produced by the Ultimate Fighting Championship that took place on August 8, 2026, at the Meta Apex in Enterprise, Nevada, part of the Las Vegas Valley, United States.

== Background ==
For the event, the Apex debuted a significant renovation that expanded the facility's seating capacity.

A lightweight bout between former KSW Featherweight and Lightweight Champion Mateusz Gamrot and Quillan Salkilld headlined the event.

A women's strawweight bout between former UFC Women's Strawweight Championship challenger Amanda Lemos and Denise Gomes was scheduled for the event. However, for undisclosed reasons, Gomes had to withdraw and was replaced by Alexia Thainara.

A middleweight bout between Eric McConico and undefeated prospect Donte Johnson was scheduled for the event. However, for undisclosed reasons, the bout was shifted to one week later at UFC 330.

A featherweight bout between Miles Johns and promotional newcomer Jessie Rosas was scheduled for the event. However, Rosas was removed from the bout just hours before weigh-ins after a UFC doctor did not clear him to compete due to a wound on his forehead, and he was replaced by Gianni Vázquez, rejoining the promotion after being released earlier in the year.

== Results ==
Fight card (Paramount+)
Weight class				Method	Round	Time	Notes
Lightweight	Quillan Salkilld	def.	Mateusz Gamrot	Submission (rear-naked choke)	1	4:25
Lightweight	Carlos Diego Ferreira	def.	Billy Quarantillo	Decision (unanimous) (30–27, 30–27, 30–27)	3	5:00
Featherweight	Yadier del Valle	def.	Darren Elkins	TKO (punch)	1	0:35
Women's Strawweight	Alexia Thainara	def.	Amanda Lemos	Decision (unanimous) (29–28, 29–28, 30–27)	3	5:00
Welterweight	Ty Miller	def.	Billy Ray Goff	TKO (punches)	3	0:15
Preliminary card (Paramount+)
Heavyweight	Steven Asplund	def.	Guilherme Pat	Decision (unanimous) (29–28, 29–28, 29–28)	3	5:00
Light Heavyweight	Diyar Nurgozhay	def.	Bruno Lopes	TKO (punches)	1	4:59
Heavyweight	José Montanha	def.	Louie Sutherland	Submission (neck crank)	1	1:50
Lightweight	Manoel Sousa	def.	Richie Miranda	Decision (unanimous) (29–28, 29–28, 29–28)	3	5:00
Featherweight	Miles Johns	def.	Gianni Vázquez	TKO (punches)	1	3:09
Women's Flyweight	Juliana Miller	def.	Ravena Oliveira	Submission (rear-naked choke)	2	1:38
Women's Strawweight	Carol Foro	def.	Giovanna Canuto	Decision (unanimous) (29–28, 29–28, 29–28)	3	5:00

== Bonus awards ==
The following fighters received $100,000 bonuses. The other finishes received $25,000 additional bonuses.

- Fight of the Night: Carlos Diego Ferreira vs. Billy Quarantillo
- Performance of the Night: Quillan Salkilld and Ty Miller

== See also ==
- 2026 in UFC
- List of current UFC fighters
- List of UFC events
