= UFC Fight Night: Nurmagomedov vs. Song =

Mixed martial arts event in 2026

- The poster for UFC Fight Night: Nurmagomedov vs. Song
- Promotion: Ultimate Fighting Championship
- Date: August 29, 2026
- Venue: SPD Bank Oriental Sports Center
- City: Shanghai, China
- Attendance: 16,188

Event chronology
UFC Fight Night: Hernandez vs. Rodrigues	UFC Fight Night: Nurmagomedov vs. Song	UFC Fight Night: Hooker vs. Parnasse

UFC Fight Night: Nurmagomedov vs. Song (also known as UFC Fight Night 286) was a mixed martial arts event produced by the Ultimate Fighting Championship that took place on August 29, 2026, at the SPD Bank Oriental Sports Center in Shanghai, China.

== Background ==
The event marked the promotion's third visit to Shanghai and first since UFC Fight Night: Walker vs. Zhang in August 2025.

A bantamweight bout between former UFC Bantamweight Championship challenger Umar Nurmagomedov and Song Yadong headlined this event.

Liu Ce and Junior Tafa were expected to meet in a light heavyweight bout at the event, but Tafa pulled out due to undisclosed reasons and was replaced by Levi Rodrigues Jr.

At the weigh-ins, three fighters missed weight:

- André Lima weighed in at 127 pounds, one pound over the flyweight non-title fight limit.
- Former ONE Women's Strawweight World Champion Xiong Jingnan and former LFA Women's Strawweight Champion Julia Polastri weighed in at 117 and 118.5 pounds, one pound and one and a half pounds over the women's strawweight non-title fight limit, respectively.

All their bouts proceeded at catchweight and all fighters were not eligible for bonuses. Lima was fined 20 percent of his individual purse which went to his opponent Road to UFC Season 4 flyweight winner Namsrai Batbayar. Xiong and Polastri, who faced each other, were not fined as a result.

== Results ==
Main card (Paramount+)
Weight class				Method	Round	Time	Notes
Bantamweight	Song Yadong	def.	Umar Nurmagomedov	KO (punch)	2	1:48
Women's Strawweight	Denise Gomes	def.	Yan Xiaonan	KO (elbow and punches)	1	4:49
Bantamweight	Kai Asakura	def.	Aori Qileng	TKO (head kick and punches)	2	0:34
Flyweight	Su Mudaerji	def.	Alex Perez	Decision (unanimous) (29–28, 29–28, 29–28)	3	5:00
Light Heavyweight	Liu Ce	def.	Levi Rodrigues Jr.	KO (punch)	1	4:26
Flyweight	Bilal Hasan	def.	Nilson Rojas	KO (punch)	2	2:28
Preliminary card (Paramount+)
Catchweight (127 lb)	André Lima	def.	Namsrai Batbayar	Submission (guillotine choke)	3	3:03
Flyweight	Rei Tsuruya	def.	Kevin Borjas	Submission (rear-naked choke)	1	4:14
Featherweight	Sean Woodson	def.	Jack Jenkins	Decision (split) (29–28, 28–29, 29–28)	3	5:00
Bantamweight	Francesco Nuzzi	def.	Xiao Long	TKO (punches)	1	1:00
Bantamweight	Hector Santiago	def.	Lawrence Lui	KO (punches)	2	0:53
Catchweight (118.5 lb)	Julia Polastri	def.	Xiong Jingnan	KO (head kick)	1	3:06
Welterweight	Cameron Nelson	def.	Ding Meng	Decision (unanimous) (29–28, 29–28, 29–28)	3	5:00

== Bonus awards ==
The following fighters received $100,000 bonuses. The other finishes received $25,000 additional bonuses.

- Fight of the Night: Liu Ce vs. Levi Rodrigues Jr.
- Performance of the Night: Song Yadong and Bilal Hasan

== See also ==
- 2026 in UFC
- List of current UFC fighters
- List of UFC events
