= UFC Fight Night: Cortes-Acosta vs. Walker =

Mixed martial arts event in 2026

- The poster for UFC Fight Night: Cortes-Acosta vs. Walker
- Promotion: Ultimate Fighting Championship
- Date: November 7, 2026
- Venue: Meta Apex
- City: Enterprise, Nevada, United States
- Attendance: Not announced

Event chronology
| UFC Fight Night: Moicano vs. Nolan | UFC Fight Night: Cortes-Acosta vs. Walker | UFC 334: Gane vs. Hokit |

UFC Fight Night: Cortes-Acosta vs. Walker (also known as UFC Fight Night 293 and UFC Vegas 124) was a mixed martial arts event produced by the Ultimate Fighting Championship that took place on November 7, 2026, at the Meta Apex in Enterprise, Nevada, part of the Las Vegas Valley, United States.

== Background ==
A welterweight bout between former LFA Welterweight Champion Gabriel Bonfim and Sean Brady was scheduled to headline the event. However, on October 29, Brady withdrew due to a staph infection in his knee, resulting in the cancellation of the bout. In turn, a non-scheduled heavyweight bout between former LFA Heavyweight Champion Waldo Cortes-Acosta and Johnny Walker was subsequently booked as the event's new headliner.

A women's strawweight bout between former UFC Women's Strawweight Championship challenger (also The Ultimate Fighter: Team Joanna vs. Team Cláudia strawweight winner) Tatiana Suarez and former Invicta FC Strawweight Champion (also former fellow strawweight title challenger) Virna Jandiroba took place at this event. They were originally scheduled to compete at UFC on ESPN: Sandhagen vs. Font in August 2023, but Jandiroba had to withdraw due to a knee injury. They were later scheduled to compete at UFC 310 in December 2024, but Suarez had to withdraw due to an unspecified health issue.

A heavyweight bout between Alvin Hines and promotional newcomer Gabriel Lorenço was scheduled for this event. However, Hines was forced to pull out from the bout due to vertigo and was replaced by former LFA heavyweight champion Thomas Petersen.

Mantas Kondratavičius and Wesley Schultz were scheduled to meet in a middleweight bout. However, Schultz pulled out from the event and was replaced by Andre Petroski.

A featherweight bout between Austin Bashi and Lucas Brennan was scheduled for the event. However, Brennan had to withdraw due to a full-thickness tear of his ACL and was replaced by promotional newcomer Carlos Calderon on four days' notice.

== Results ==
Fight card (Paramount+)
| Weight class | | | | Method | Round | Time | Notes |
|---|---|---|---|---|---|---|---|
| Heavyweight | Johnny Walker | def. | Waldo Cortes-Acosta | TKO (punches) | 3 | 2:27 |
| Women's Strawweight | Tatiana Suarez | def. | Virna Jandiroba | Decision (unanimous) (30–27, 30–27, 29–28) | 3 | 5:00 |
| Bantamweight | Elijah Smith | def. | Davey Grant | KO (punches) | 1 | 1:00 |
| Light Heavyweight | Lucas Fernando | def. | Billy Elekana | Decision (unanimous) (29–28, 29–28, 29–28) | 3 | 5:00 |
| Women's Bantamweight | Nina Nikolija Milošević | def. | Priscila Cachoeira | TKO (elbows and punches) | 2 | 3:40 |
| Flyweight | Mitch Raposo | def. | Marcos Degli | Decision (unanimous) (29–28, 29–28, 29–28) | 3 | 5:00 |
Preliminary card (Paramount+)
| Featherweight | Ollie Schmid | def. | Keiichiro Nakamura | Decision (unanimous) (29–28, 29–28, 29–28) | 3 | 5:00 |
| Heavyweight | Thomas Petersen | def. | Gabriel Lorenço | TKO (punches) | 3 | 4:47 |
| Women's Flyweight | Karine Silva | def. | Gabriella Fernandes | Decision (unanimous) (29–28, 29–28, 29–28) | 3 | 5:00 |
| Featherweight | Murtazali Magomedov | def. | José Mauro Delano | Decision (unanimous) (29–28, 29–28, 29–28) | 3 | 5:00 |
| Featherweight | Austin Bashi | def. | Carlos Calderon | Submission (rear-naked choke) | 1 | 1:07 |
| Middleweight | Andre Petroski | def. | Mantas Kondratavičius | TKO (elbows and punches) | 2 | 4:39 |
| Welterweight | Ko Seok-hyeon | def. | Wellington Turman | Decision (unanimous) (30–27, 30–27, 30–27) | 3 | 5:00 |
| Welterweight | José Henrique Souza | def. | Jonny Parsons | KO (punches) | 1 | 4:16 |

== Bonus awards ==
The following fighters received bonuses: $100,000. The other finishes received $25,000 additional bonuses.

- Fight of the Night: Johnny Walker vs. Waldo Cortes-Acosta
- Performance of the Night: Elijah Smith and Thomas Petersen

== See also ==
- 2026 in UFC
- List of current UFC fighters
- List of UFC events
