= 2023 in Oktagon MMA =

Czech mixed martial arts promotion

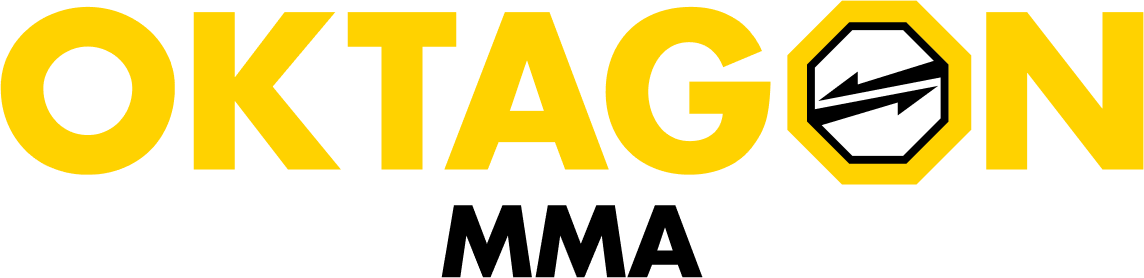

Information
- First date: February 11, 2023
- Last date: December 29, 2023

Events
- Total events: 14

Fights
- Total fights: 147
- Title fights: 13

Chronology
2022 in Oktagon MMA	2023 in Oktagon MMA	2024 in Oktagon MMA

The year 2023 was the 7th year in the history of the Oktagon MMA, a mixed martial arts promotion based in Czech Republic and Slovakia. 2023 began with Oktagon 39.

== List of events ==
#	Event	Date	Venue	Location
1	Oktagon 39: Jungwirth vs. Oliveira	Feb 11, 2023	Audi Dome	Munich, Germany
2	Oktagon 40: Kozma vs. Siwiec	Mar 4, 2023	Ostravar Aréna	Ostrava, Czech Republic
3	Oktagon 41: Mågård vs. Lopez	Apr 15, 2023	Home Credit Arena	Liberec, Czech Republic
4	Oktagon 42: Keita vs. Tichota	Apr 29, 2023	Ondrej Nepela Arena	Bratislava, Slovakia
5	Oktagon 43: Kincl vs. Vémola 2	May 20, 2023	O2 Arena	Prague, Czech Republic
6	Oktagon 44: Langer vs. Poppeck	Jun 17, 2023	Rudolf Weber-Arena	Oberhausen, Germany
7	Oktagon 45 Special: Mågård vs. Lima	Jul 28, 2023	Central Tennis Court Štvanice	Prague, Czech Republic
8	Oktagon 45: Sanikidze vs. Keita	Jul 29, 2023	Central Tennis Court Štvanice	Prague, Czech Republic
9	Oktagon 46: Dalisda vs. Austin	Sep 16, 2023	Festhalle Frankfurt	Frankfurt, Germany
10	Oktagon 47: Vémola vs. Langer	Oct 7, 2023	Tipos Aréna	Bratislava, Slovakia
11	Oktagon 48: Aby vs. Garcia	Nov 4, 2023	AO Arena	Manchester, England
12	Oktagon 49: Moeil vs. Todev	Nov 18, 2023	Lanxess Arena	Cologne, Germany
13	Oktagon 50: Keita vs. Samsonidse	Dec 9, 2023	Ostravar Aréna	Ostrava, Czech Republic
14	Oktagon 51: Tipsport Gamechanger Final	Dec 29, 2023	O2 Arena	Prague, Czech Republic

== Oktagon Welterweight Tournament ==
First round
(Poland) Łukasz Siwiec	3
(Czech Republic) David Kozma	SD
(Slovakia) Samuel Krištofič	3
(France) Alex Lohoré	UD
(Serbia) Bojan Veličković	SUB
(Moldova) Ion Surdu	1
(Germany) Christian Jungwirth	3
(Spain) Tato Primera	UD
(Hungary) Máté Kertész	1
(Germany) Marcel Mohamed Grabinski	KO
(Brazil) Leandro Silva	3
(Greece) Andreas Michailidis	UD
(Slovakia) Radovan Úškrt	3
(Netherlands) Melvin van Suijdam	UD
(Denmark) Louis Glismann	UD
(Czech Republic) Andrej Kalašnik	3

Second round
(Czech Republic) David Kozma	UD
(France) Alex Lohoré	3
(Serbia) Bojan Veličković	UD
(Germany) Christian Jungwirth	3
(Germany) Marcel Mohamed Grabinski	2
(Greece) Andreas Michailidis	SUB
(Netherlands) Melvin van Suijdam	1
(Denmark) Louis Glismann	SUB

Semi-finals
(Czech Republic) David Kozma	1
(Serbia) Bojan Veličković	KO
(Greece) Andreas Michailidis	KO
(Denmark) Louis Glismann	1

Finals
(Serbia) Bojan Veličković	SUB
(Greece) Andreas Michailidis	3

== Title fights ==
Title fights in 2023
Weight class				Method	Round	Time	Event	Notes
Bantamweight	Jonas Mågård (c)	def.	Gustavo Lopez (ic)	TKO (punches)	2	0:31	Oktagon 41	(Note: For the Oktagon Bantamweight Championship.)
Featherweight	Losene Keita	def.	Jakub Tichota	TKO (punch)	4	3:53	Oktagon 42	(Note: For the interim Oktagon Featherweight Championship.)
Middleweight	Patrik Kincl (c)	def.	Karlos Vémola	Decision (unanimous) (49–46, 50–45, 50–45)	5	5:00	Oktagon 43	(Note: For the Oktagon Middleweight Championship.)
Light Heavyweight	Pavol Langer	def.	Alexander Poppeck	Decision (split) (48–47, 47–48, 48–47)	5	5:00	Oktagon 44	(Note: For the interim Oktagon Light Heavyweight Championship.)
Bantamweight	Felipe Lima	def.	Jonas Mågård (c)	Decision (unanimous) (48–45, 48–45, 48–46)	5	5:00	Oktagon 45 Special	(Note: For the Oktagon Bantamweight Championship. Lima was deducted one point in round 4 due to an illegal knees.)
Featherweight	Mate Sanikidze (c)	def.	Losene Keita (ic)	TKO (leg injury)	1	1:08	Oktagon 45	(Note: For the Oktagon Featherweight Championship.)
Women's Strawweight	Katharina Dalisda	def.	Jacinta Austin	Submission (guillotine choke)	3	3:40	Oktagon 46	(Note: For the inaugural Oktagon Women's Strawweight Championship.)
Light Heavyweight	Karlos Vémola (c)	def.	Pavol Langer (ic)	KO (punches)	1	0:07	Oktagon 47	(Note: For the Oktagon Light Heavyweight Championship.)
Flyweight	Elias Garcia	def.	Aaron Aby	TKO (doctor stoppage)	2	5:00	Oktagon 48	(Note: For the inaugural Oktagon Flyweight Championship.)
Heavyweight	Hatef Moeil	def.	Lazar Todev	Decision (unanimous) (49–46, 49–46, 48–47)	5	5:00	Oktagon 49	(Note: For the vacant Oktagon Heavyweight Championship.)
Lightweight	Ronald Paradeiser	def.	Ivan Buchinger	TKO (doctor stoppage)	3	5:00	Oktagon 50	(Note: For the vacant Oktagon Lightweight Championship.)
Featherweight	Losene Keita	def.	Niko Samsonidse	KO (punches)	2	0:23	Oktagon 50	(Note: For the vacant Oktagon Featherweight Championship.)
Middleweight	Piotr Wawrzyniak	def.	Vlasto Čepo	TKO (punches)	3	3:19	Oktagon 51	(Note: For the interim Oktagon Middleweight Championship.)

== Oktagon 39: Jungwirth vs. Oliveira ==
Oktagon 39: Jungwirth vs. Oliveira
- Promotion: Oktagon MMA
- Date: February 11, 2023
- Venue: Audi Dome
- City: Munich, Germany
- Attendance: 7,000

Oktagon 39: Jungwirth vs. Oliveira was a mixed martial arts event held by Oktagon MMA on February 11, 2023, in Munich, Germany.

=== Background ===
A welterweight bout between Christian Jungwirth and Denilson Neves de Oliveira headlined the event.

=== Results ===
Main card (DAZN)
Weight class				Method	Round	Time	Notes
Welterweight	Christian Jungwirth	def.	Denilson Neves de Oliveira	Decision (split) (29–28, 28–29, 29–28)	3	5:00	(Note: Neves missed weight (177 lb).)
Light Heavyweight	Alexander Poppeck	def.	Martin Zawada	Decision (unanimous) (30–26, 30–25, 30–25)	3	5:00
Featherweight	Losene Keita	def.	Samuel Bark	TKO (punches)	3	0:30
Light Heavyweight	Pavol Langer	def.	Rafael Xavier	Decision (split) (29–28, 27–30, 29–28)	3	5:00
Lightweight	Ronald Paradeiser	def.	Vladimir Šikić	TKO (punches)	2	2:08
Heavyweight	Hatef Moeil	def.	Wallyson Carvalho	Decision (unanimous) (30–27, 30–27, 30–27)	3	5:00
Preliminary card (DAZN)
Catchweight (213 lb)	Vlasto Čepo	vs.	Héctor Lombard	Draw (time limit)	3	3:00	(Note: Boxing bout.)
Featherweight	Vladimír Lengal	def.	Cem Kuyumcuoglu	TKO (punches)	2	4:30
Welterweight	Marek Bartl	def.	Kevin Hangs	KO (punches)	1	2:03
Free Prelims (YouTube)
Welterweight	Lukas Cruz	def.	Tayo Odunjo	Decision (unanimous) (30–27, 30–27, 29–28)	3	5:00

== Oktagon 40: Kozma vs. Siwiec ==
Oktagon 40: Kozma vs. Siwiec
- Promotion: Oktagon MMA
- Date: February 10, 2023
- Venue: Ostravar Aréna
- City: Ostrava, Czech Republic

Oktagon 40: Kozma vs. Siwiec was a mixed martial arts event held by Oktagon MMA on March 4, 2023, in Ostrava, Czech Republic.

=== Background ===
The event featured the opening rounds of Tipsport Gamechanger Tournament 1 in a welterweight divisions and headlined between former Oktagon Welterweight Champion David Kozma and Łukasz Siwiec.

=== Results ===
Main card (DAZN)
Weight class				Method	Round	Time	Notes
Welterweight	David Kozma	def.	Łukasz Siwiec	Decision (split) (29–28, 28–29, 29–28)	3	5:00	(Note: Oktagon Welterweight Tournament Round of 16.)
Welterweight	Alex Lohoré	def.	Samuel Krištofič	Decision (unanimous) (29–27, 29–27, 29–28)	3	5:00	(Note: Oktagon Welterweight Tournament Round of 16.)
Welterweight	Christian Jungwirth	def.	Tato Primera	Decision (unanimous) (29–28, 29–28, 29–28)	3	5:00	(Note: Oktagon Welterweight Tournament Round of 16.)
Welterweight	Louis Glismann	def.	Andrej Kalašnik	Decision (unanimous) (30–26, 30–26, 30–27)	3	5:00	(Note: Oktagon Welterweight Tournament Round of 16.)
Welterweight	Andreas Michailidis	def.	Leandro Silva	Decision (unanimous) (30–27, 30–27, 29–28)	3	5:00	(Note: Oktagon Welterweight Tournament Round of 16.)
Lightweight	Jaroslav Pokorný	def.	Jan Široký	TKO (punches)	2	3:09
Preliminary card (DAZN)
Welterweight	Marcel Mohamed Grabinski	def.	Máté Kertész	KO (punches)	1	2:50	(Note: Oktagon Welterweight Tournament Round of 16.)
Welterweight	Bojan Veličković	def.	Ion Surdu	Submission (anaconda choke)	1	2:55	(Note: Oktagon Welterweight Tournament Round of 16.)
Welterweight	Melvin van Suijdam	def.	Radovan Úškrt	Decision (unanimous) (29–28, 29–28, 29–28)	3	5:00	(Note: Oktagon Welterweight Tournament Round of 16.)
Free Prelims (YouTube)
Welterweight	Matúš Juráček	def.	John Palaiologos	Decision (unanimous) (30–27, 30–27, 30–27)	3	5:00	(Note: Oktagon Welterweight Tournament Reserve bout.)

== Oktagon 41: Mågård vs. Lopez ==
Oktagon 41: Mågård vs. Lopez
- Promotion: Oktagon MMA
- Date: April 15, 2023
- Venue: Home Credit Arena
- City: Liberec, Czech Republic

Oktagon 41: Mågård vs. Lopez was a mixed martial arts event held by Oktagon MMA on April 15, 2023, in Liberec, Czech Republic.

=== Background ===
A Oktagon Bantamweight Championship unification bout between current champion Jonas Mågård and interim champion Gustavo Lopez headlined the event.

=== Results ===
Main card (DAZN)
Weight class				Method	Round	Time	Notes
Bantamweight	Jonas Mågård (c)	def.	Gustavo Lopez (ic)	TKO (punches)	2	0:31	(Note: For the Oktagon Bantamweight Championship.)
Catchweight (203 lb)	Karlos Vémola	def.	Al Matavao	Submission (rear-naked choke)	1	3:18	(Note: Matavao missed weight (209 lb).)
Light Heavyweight	Dan Vinni	def.	Daniel Škvor	Submission (heel hook)	1	1:20
Heavyweight	Lazar Todev	def.	Adam Pałasz	Decision (unanimous) (29–28, 29–28, 29–28)	3	5:00
Catchweight (161 lb)	Jan Malach	def.	Ebrahim Hosseinpour	TKO (elbows)	1	2:03	(Note: Malach missed weight (165 lb).)
Preliminary card (DAZN)
Light Heavyweight	Mateusz Strzelczyk	def.	Jorick Montagnac	KO (punch)	1	2:51
Catchweight (192 lb)	Václav Mikulášek	def.	Matyas Viszlay	KO (knee to the body)	1	4:47
Catchweight (214 lb)	Nermin Hajdarpašić	vs.	Robin Fošum	Draw (split) (29–28, 28–29, 28–28)	3	5:00
Middleweight	Jamie Cordero	def.	Ondřej Raška	KO (punches)	1	1:07
Lightweight	Hafeni Nafuka	def.	Peter Gabal	Submission (guillotine choke)	2	2:42
Free Prelims (YouTube)
Catchweight (192 lb)	Melvin Mané	def.	Szymon Broncel	TKO (elbows)	2	2:20

== Oktagon 42: Keita vs. Tichota ==
Oktagon 42: Keita vs. Tichota
- Promotion: Oktagon MMA
- Date: April 29, 2023
- Venue: Zimny Stadion Ondreja Nepelu
- City: Bratislava, Slovakia

Oktagon 42: Keita vs. Tichota was a mixed martial arts event held by Oktagon MMA on April 29, 2023, in Bratislava, Slovakia.

=== Background ===
A Oktagon Featherweight Championship bout between current champion Mate Sanikidze and current Oktagon Lightweight Champion Losene Keita was scheduled to headline the event. However, Sanikidze withdrew shoulder injury and was replaced by Jakub Tichota for the interim title.

=== Results ===
Main card (DAZN)
Weight class				Method	Round	Time	Notes
Featherweight	Losene Keita	def.	Jakub Tichota	TKO (punch)	4	3:53	(Note: For the interim Oktagon Featherweight Championship.)
Middleweight	Vlasto Čepo	def.	Ion Taburceanu	TKO (punches)	2	1:54
Lightweight	Karol Ryšavý	def.	Matouš Kohout	Decision (unanimous) (30–27, 30–27, 29–28)	3	5:00
Catchweight (229 lb)	Jeremy Kimball	def.	Ruben Wolf	TKO (punches)	2	4:05
Catchweight (157 lb)	Shem Rock	vs.	Arthur Lima	Draw (majority) (29–28, 28–28, 28–28)	3	5:00
Preliminary card (DAZN)
Featherweight	Niko Samsonidse	def.	Roman Paulus	Decision (unanimous) (30–27, 30–27, 30–27)	3	5:00
Heavyweight	Stuart Austin	def.	John Winter	Decision (unanimous) (30–27, 30–27, 30–27)	3	5:00
Women's Strawweight	Katharina Dalisda	def.	Isabela de Pádua	TKO (elbows)	3	4:42
Featherweight	Jakub Dohnal	def.	Callum Mullen	Decision (unanimous) (30–27, 29–28, 29–28)	3	5:00
Free Prelims (YouTube)
Catchweight (187 lb)	Marek Bartl	def.	Ole Magnor	Decision (unanimous) (30–27, 29–28, 29–28)	3	5:00	(Note: Oktagon Underground Rules (3min / 3R).)

== Oktagon 43: Kincl vs. Vémola 2 ==
Oktagon 43: Kincl vs. Vémola 2
- Promotion: Oktagon MMA
- Date: May 20, 2023
- Venue: O2 Arena
- City: Prague, Czech Republic

Oktagon 43: Kincl vs. Vémola 2 was a mixed martial arts event held by Oktagon MMA on May 20, 2023, in Prague, Czech Republic.

=== Background ===
A Oktagon Middleweight Championship between current champion Patrik Kincl and former champion (also a current Oktagon Light Heavyweight Champion) Karlos Vémola headlined the event. While, this event also featured the two bouts quarterfinals of Tipsport Gamechanger Tournament 1 in a welterweight divisions.

=== Results ===
Main card (DAZN)
Weight class				Method	Round	Time	Notes
Middleweight	Patrik Kincl (c)	def.	Karlos Vémola	Decision (unanimous) (49–46, 50–45, 50–45)	5	5:00	(Note: For the Oktagon Middleweight Championship.)
Welterweight	David Kozma	def.	Alex Lohoré	Decision (unanimous) (30–27, 30–27, 30–27)	3	5:00	(Note: Oktagon Welterweight Tournament Quarterfinal; Lehoré missed weight (173.5 lb).)
Welterweight	Louis Glismann	def.	Melvin van Suijdam	Submission (reserve omoplata)	1	4:57	(Note: Oktagon Welterweight Tournament Quarterfinal.)
Middleweight	Robert Bryczek	def.	Lee Chadwick	KO (punch)	1	2:41
Lightweight	Mateusz Legierski	def.	Matěj Kuzník	Decision (unanimous) (29–28, 29–28, 29–28)	3	5:00
Catchweight (175 lb)	Miroslav Brož	def.	Robert Pukač	Decision (split) (28–29, 29–28, 29–28)	3	5:00
Preliminary card (DAZN)
Middleweight	Marek Mazúch	def.	Giovanni Melillo	KO (punches)	2	1:53
Catchweight (179 lb)	Amiran Gogoladze	def.	Liam Etebar	Decision (unanimous) (30–27, 30–27, 30–26)	3	5:00	(Note: Oktagon Welterweight Tournament Reserve bout.)
Light Heavyweight	Marc Doussis	def.	Daniel Toledo Canellas	Submission (guillotine choke)	1	2:59
Catchweight (150 lb)	Ahmed Vila	def.	Kimbo Tinghaugen	Submission (rear-naked choke)	1	3:55
Free Prelims (YouTube)
Middleweight	Matěj Daněk	def.	Endrit Brajshori	Submission (rear-naked choke)	2	3:26

== Oktagon 44: Langer vs. Poppeck ==
Oktagon 44: Langer vs. Poppeck
- Promotion: Oktagon MMA
- Date: June 17, 2023
- Venue: Rudolf Weber-Arena
- City: Oberhausen, Germany

Oktagon 44: Langer vs. Poppeck is a mixed martial arts event held by Oktagon MMA on June 14, 2023, in Oberhausen, Germany.

=== Background ===
An interim Oktagon Light Heavyweight Championship bout between Pavol Langer and Alexander Poppeck headlined the event.

=== Results ===
Main card (DAZN)
Weight class				Method	Round	Time	Notes
Light Heavyweight	Pavol Langer	def.	Alexander Poppeck	Decision (split) (48–47, 47–48, 48–47)	5	5:00	(Note: For the interim Oktagon Light Heavyweight Championship.)
Welterweight	Bojan Veličković	def.	Christian Jungwirth	Decision (unanimous) (30–27, 30–27, 29–28)	3	5:00	(Note: Oktagon Welterweight Tournament Quarterfinal.)
Welterweight	Andreas Michailidis	def.	Marcel Mohamed Grabinski	Submission (arm-triangle choke)	2	3:02	(Note: Oktagon Welterweight Tournament Quarterfinal.)
Light Heavyweight	Rafael Xavier	def.	Mateusz Strzelczyk	TKO (leg injury)	3	2:47
Lightweight	Ronald Paradeiser	def.	Andrew Fisher	TKO (punches)	3	1:29
Middleweight	Hojat Khajevand	def.	Zdeněk Polívka	Submission (rear-naked choke)	2	1:04
Preliminary card (DAZN)
Bantamweight	Antun Račić	def.	Josivaldo Costa Araújo	TKO (foot injury)	1	3:43
Welterweight	Łukasz Siwiec	def.	John Hathaway	Decision (unanimous) (30–27, 30–27, 30–27)	3	5:00	(Note: Oktagon Welterweight Tournament Reserve bout.)
Women's Strawweight	Jacinta Austin	def.	Sofiia Bagishvili	Submission (rear-naked choke)	1	2:19
Catchweight (161 lb)	Hafeni Nafuka	def.	Adrian Kępa	Submission (armbar)	1	2:15
Free Prelims (YouTube)
Catchweight (159 lb)	Hassan Shaaban	def.	Denis Gondžala	Decision (unanimous) (30–26, 30–27, 30–27)	3	5:00

== Oktagon 45 Special: Mågård vs. Lima ==
Oktagon 45 Special: Mågård vs. Lima
- Promotion: Oktagon MMA
- Date: July 28, 2023
- Venue: Central Tennis Court Štvanice
- City: Prague, Czech Republic

Oktagon 45 Special: Mågård vs. Lima was a mixed martial arts event held by Oktagon MMA on July 28, 2023, in Prague, Czech Republic.

=== Background ===
A Oktagon Bantamweight Championship bout between current champion Jonas Mågård and former KSW Bantamweight Champion Antun Račić was scheduled to headline the event. However, Račić withdrew for unknown reasons and was replaced by Felipe Lima.

=== Results ===
Main card (DAZN)
Weight class				Method	Round	Time	Notes
Bantamweight	Felipe Lima	def.	Jonas Mågård (c)	Decision (unanimous) (48–45, 48–45, 48–46)	5	5:00	(Note: For the Oktagon Bantamweight Championship. Lima was deducted one point in round 4 due to illegal knees.)
Middleweight	Robert Bryczek	def.	Samuel Krištofič	TKO (punches)	1	0:55	(Note: Oktagon Middleweight title eliminator.)
Featherweight	Vladimír Lengál	def.	Michael Deiga-Scheck	KO (knee)	1	2:59
Welterweight	Ion Surdu	def.	Máté Kertész	Decision (unanimous) (30–27, 29–28, 29–28)	3	5:00
Lightweight	Shem Rock	def.	Jan Malach	Submission (rear-naked choke)	1	2:08
Preliminary card (DAZN)
Catchweight (176 lb)	Radovan Úškrt	def.	Tato Primera	TKO (doctor stoppage)	2	4:55
Middleweight	Ole Magnor	def.	Václav Mikulášek	Submission (rear-naked choke)	1	0:55
Middleweight	Jamie Cordero	def.	Gabriel Török	KO (head kick)	1	0:22
Featherweight	Radek Roušal	def.	Armand Herczeg	Decision (split) (30–27, 28–29, 29–28)	3	5:00
Free Prelims (YouTube)
Women's Bantamweight	Róża Gumienna	def.	Lucia Krajčovič	Decision (unanimous) (30–27, 30–27, 29–28)	3	5:00

== Oktagon 45: Sanikidze vs. Keita ==
Oktagon 45: Sanikidze vs. Keita
- Promotion: Oktagon MMA
- Date: July 29, 2023
- Venue: Central Tennis Court Štvanice
- City: Prague, Czech Republic

Oktagon 45: Sanikidze vs. Keita was a mixed martial arts event held by Oktagon MMA on July 29, 2023, in Prague, Czech Republic.

=== Background ===
A Oktagon Featherweight Championship unification bout between current champion Mate Sanikidze and interim champion (also a current Oktagon Lightweight Champion) Losene Keita headlined the event.

=== Results ===
Main card (DAZN)
Weight class				Method	Round	Time	Notes
Featherweight	Mate Sanikidze (c)	def.	Losene Keita (ic)	TKO (leg injury)	1	1:08	(Note: For the Oktagon Featherweight Championship.)
Catchweight (201 lb)	Karlos Vémola	def.	Lucas Alsina	Decision (unanimous) (30–26, 30–26, 30–26)	3	5:00
Lightweight	Ivan Buchinger	def.	Aboubakar Tounkara	TKO (punches)	1	0:55
Light Heavyweight	Daniel Škvor	def.	Nermin Hajdarpašić	Submission (guillotine choke)	1	1:40
Heavyweight	Lazar Todev	def.	Wallyson Carvalho	Submission (Achilles lock)	1	4:57
Lightweight	Jan Široký	def.	Ondřej Petrášek	TKO (punches)	2	4:45	(Note: Petrášek missed weight (157.1 lb).)
Preliminary card (DAZN)
Catchweight (148 lb)	Eduard Kexel	def.	Michal Jančuška	Decision (unanimous) (30–27, 30–27, 30–27)	3	5:00
Lightweight	Akonne Wanliss	def.	Giorgi Gogotchuri	TKO (punches and elbows)	1	2:07
Featherweight	Roman Paulus	def.	Callum Mullen	Decision (unanimous) (30–27, 30–27, 30–27)	3	5:00	(Note: Mullen missed weight (148.8 lb).)
Welterweight	Vladislav Kanchev	def.	James Lewis	TKO (punches)	2	1:54
Free Prelims (YouTube)
Featherweight	Nikolaos Serbezis	def.	Ivan Klevets	Submission (armbar)	2	4:13	(Note: Serbezis missed weight (147.5 lb).)

== Oktagon 46: Dalisda vs. Austin ==
Oktagon 46: Dalisda vs. Austin
- Promotion: Oktagon MMA
- Date: September 16, 2023
- Venue: Festhalle Frankfurt
- City: Frankfurt, Germany

Oktagon 46: Dalisda vs. Austin was a mixed martial arts event held by Oktagon MMA on September 16, 2023, in Frankfurt, Germany.

=== Background ===
The inaugural Oktagon Women's Strawweight Championship bout between Katharina Dalisda and Jacinta Austin headlined the event. While, this event also featured the semifinals of Tipsport Gamechanger 1 welterweight tournament.

=== Results ===
Main card (DAZN)
Weight class				Method	Round	Time	Notes
Women's Strawweight	Katharina Dalisda	def.	Jacinta Austin	Submission (guillotine choke)	3	3:40	(Note: For the inaugural Oktagon Women's Strawweight Championship.)
Welterweight	Bojan Veličković	def.	David Kozma	KO (punches)	1	3:45	(Note: Oktagon Welterweight Tournament Semifinal.)
Welterweight	John Palaiologos	def.	Christian Jungwirth	Submission (kimura)	1	3:46	(Note: Oktagon Welterweight Tournament Reserve bout.)
Welterweight	Andreas Michailidis	def.	Louis Glismann	KO (punches)	1	0:33	(Note: Oktagon Welterweight Tournament Semifinal.)
Welterweight	Leandro Silva	def.	Marcel Mohamed Grabinski	Submission (rear-naked choke)	3	4:34	(Note: Oktagon Welterweight Tournament Reserve bout; Grabinski missed weight (173.9 lb).)
Middleweight	Kerim Engizek	def.	Matias Juarez	KO (punch)	1	1:39
Preliminary card (DAZN)
Featherweight	Deniz Ilbay	def.	Marco Novák	TKO (punches)	3	4:11
Featherweight	Niko Samsonidse	def.	Nicolae Hantea	Submission (triangle choke)	1	4:10
Lightweight	František Fodor	def.	Vladimir Šikić	TKO (doctor stoppage)	1	3:36	(Note: Šikić missed weight (157.2 lb).)
Catchweight (176 lb)	Tayo Odunjo	def.	Selim Topuz	Decision (unanimous) (29–28, 29–28, 29–28)	3	5:00	(Note: Topuz missed weight (176.4 lb).)
Free Prelims (YouTube)
Welterweight	Daniel Hromek	def.	Zoran Solaja	Decision (unanimous) (30–27, 30–27, 29–28)	3	5:00

== Oktagon 47: Vémola vs. Langer ==
Oktagon 47: Vémola vs. Langer
- Promotion: Oktagon MMA
- Date: October 7, 2023
- Venue: Tipos Aréna
- City: Bratislava, Slovakia

Oktagon 47: Vémola vs. Langer was a mixed martial arts event held by Oktagon MMA on October 7, 2023, in Bratislava, Slovakia.

=== Background ===
A Oktagon Light Heavyweight Championship unification bout between current champion (also former Oktagon Middleweight Champion) Karlos Vémola and interim champion Pavol Langer headlined the event.

=== Results ===
Main card (DAZN)
Weight class				Method	Round	Time	Notes
Light Heavyweight	Karlos Vémola (c)	def.	Pavol Langer (ic)	KO (punches)	1	0:07	(Note: For the Oktagon Light Heavyweight Championship.)
Lightweight	Ivan Buchinger	def.	Jakub Dohnal	TKO (punches)	2	4:46
Heavyweight	Adam Pałasz	def.	Sofiane Boukichou	Decision (unanimous) (30–27, 30–27, 30–27)	3	5:00
Lightweight	Mateusz Legierski	def.	Karol Ryšavý	Decision (unanimous) (30–27, 30–27, 30–27)	3	5:00
Middleweight	Marek Mazúch	def.	Jamie Cordero	TKO (punches)	3	0:33
Welterweight	Amiran Gogoladze	def.	Łukasz Siwiec	Decision (unanimous) (29–27, 29–27, 30–26)	3	5:00	(Note: Siwiec was deducted one point in round 3 due to an illegal upkick.)
Preliminary card (DAZN)
Welterweight	Matouš Kohout	def.	Robert Pukač	Decision (unanimous) (29–28, 29–28, 30–27)	3	5:00
Women's Bantamweight	Lucia Szabová	def.	Alexandra Andersrod	Decision (unanimous) (30–27, 30–27, 30–27)	3	3:00	(Note: Oktagon Underground Rules (3min / 3R).)
Bantamweight	Beno Adamia	def.	Gustavo Lopez	Decision (unanimous) (29–28, 29–28, 29–28)	3	5:00	(Note: Lopez missed weight (139.7 lb).)
Catchweight (132 lb)	Megan Morris	def.	Veronika Smolková	Submission (armbar)	3	4:47
Free Prelims (YouTube)
Middleweight	Ahmed Sami	def.	Adam Horváth	TKO (punches)	1	3:49	(Note: Sami missed weight (187 lb).)

== Oktagon 48: Aby vs. Garcia ==
Oktagon 48: Aby vs. Garcia
- Promotion: Oktagon MMA
- Date: November 4, 2023
- Venue: AO Arena
- City: Manchester, England

Oktagon 48: Aby vs. Garcia was a mixed martial arts event held by Oktagon MMA on November 4, 2023, in Manchester, England.

=== Background ===
The event was headlined by an inaugural Oktagon Flyweight Championship bout between Aaron Aby and Elias Garcia.

=== Results ===
Main card (DAZN)
Weight class				Method	Round	Time	Notes
Flyweight	Elias Garcia	def.	Aaron Aby	TKO (doctor stoppage)	2	5:00	(Note: For the inaugural Oktagon Flyweight Championship.)
Catchweight (204 lb)	Scott Askham	def.	Marc Doussis	Decision (unanimous) (29–28, 29–28, 30–27)	3	5:00
Lightweight	Jakub Bahník	vs.	Akonne Wanliss	No Contest (accidental knee to groin)	1	0:25	(Note: Accidental knee to the groin rendered Bahník unable to continue.)
Middleweight	Jake Quickenden	def.	Paul Smith	TKO (punches)	1	1:16	(Note: Oktagon's UK reality show: Stage to the Cage Final.)
Bantamweight	Jack Cartwright	def.	Júnior Assis	Submission (scarf hold armlock)	1	2:15
Lightweight	George Staines	def.	Denis Frimpong	Submission (guillotine choke)	4	2:02	(Note: Oktagon Challenge: England vs. Ireland Tournament Final.)
Preliminary card (DAZN)
Welterweight	Ion Surdu	def.	Alex Lehoré	KO (punches)	1	4:10
Catchweight (150 lb)	Shoaib Yousaf	def.	Konmon Deh	Decision (unanimous) (29–28, 29–28, 30–27)	3	5:00
Catchweight (190 lb)	Zdeněk Polívka	def.	Lee Chadwick	Decision (unanimous) (29–28, 29–28, 29–28)	3	5:00
Free Prelims (YouTube)
Lightweight	Hascen Neri Gelezi	def.	Aaron McDonald	Decision (unanimous) (29–28, 29–28, 29–28)	3	5:00

== Oktagon 49: Moeil vs. Todev ==
Oktagon 49: Moeil vs. Todev
- Promotion: Oktagon MMA
- Date: November 18, 2023
- Venue: Lanxess Arena
- City: Cologne, Germany

Oktagon 49: Moeil vs. Todev was a mixed martial arts event held by Oktagon MMA on November 18, 2023, in Cologne, Germany.

=== Background ===
A Oktagon Heavyweight Championship bout for the vacant title between Hatef Moeil and Lazar Todev headlined the event.

=== Results ===
Main card (DAZN)
Weight class				Method	Round	Time	Notes
Heavyweight	Hatef Moeil	def.	Lazar Todev	Decision (unanimous) (49–46, 49–46, 48–47)	5	5:00	(Note: For the vacant Oktagon Heavyweight Championship.)
Catchweight (176 lb)	Leandro Silva	def.	Christian Eckerlin	Decision (unanimous) (29–28, 29–28, 29–28)	3	5:00
Middleweight	Kerim Engizek	def.	Adam Horváth	TKO (punches)	1	3:48
Featherweight	Corey Fry	def.	Deniz Ilbay	Submission (armbar)	1	3:35	(Note: Ilbay missed weight (148 lb).)
Welterweight	Niklas Stolze	def.	Andrej Kalašnik	KO (punches)	1	3:40
Middleweight	Matthew Bonner	def.	Cihad Akipa	Decision (unanimous) (29–28, 29–28, 29–28)	3	5:00
Preliminary card (DAZN)
Lightweight	Konrad Dyrschka	def.	Thiago Silva	Decision (majority) (28–28, 28–27, 29–27)	3	5:00
Light Heavyweight	Jorick Montagnac	def.	Steve MacDonald	KO (punches)	1	4:10
Catchweight (150 lb)	Arijan Topallaj	def.	Roman Paulus	Submission (brabo choke)	1	1:40	(Note: Topallaj missed weight (156.3 lb).)
Featherweight	Jake McHugh	def.	Ivan Klevets	Technical Submission (triangle choke)	2	2:32
Free Prelims (YouTube)
Welterweight	Lukáš Eliáš	def.	Finn Griessmann	KO (punches)	1	2:39

== Oktagon 50: Keita vs. Samsonidse ==
Oktagon 50: Keita vs. Samsonidse
- Promotion: Oktagon MMA
- Date: December 9, 2023
- Venue: Ostravar Aréna
- City: Ostrava, Czech Republic

Oktagon 50: Keita vs. Samsonidse was a mixed martial arts event held by Oktagon MMA on December 9, 2023, in Ostrava, Czech Republic.

=== Background ===
A Oktagon Featherweight Championship for the vacant title between former Oktagon Lightweight Champion Losene Keita and Niko Samsonidse headlined the event. Former champion Mate Sanikidze announced that he vacated the title when he moved down to bantamweight.

A Oktagon Lightweight Championship rematch for the vacant title between Ronald Paradeiser and former champion (also former Oktagon Featherweight Champion) Ivan Buchinger served as co-main event. The pairing previously met at Oktagon 27 in February 2021, with Buchinger captured the title via first round submission.

=== Results ===
Main card (DAZN)
Weight class				Method	Round	Time	Notes
Featherweight	Losene Keita	def.	Niko Samsonidse	KO (punches)	2	0:23	(Note: For the vacant Oktagon Featherweight Championship.)
Lightweight	Ronald Paradeiser	def.	Ivan Buchinger	TKO (doctor stoppage)	3	5:00	(Note: For the vacant Oktagon Lightweight Championship.)
Featherweight	Samuel Bark	def.	Vladimír Lengál	Decision (split) (29–28, 28–29, 29–28)	3	5:00
Middleweight	Matěj Peňáz	def.	Ole Magnor	KO (punches)	1	0:29
Lightweight	Stefano Catacoli	def.	Jan Široký	Decision (unanimous) (29–28, 29–28, 29–27)	3	5:00
Preliminary card (DAZN)
Light Heavyweight	Rafael Xavier	def.	Dan Vinni	TKO (punches)	2	1:27
Lightweight	Ebrahim Hosseinpour	def.	Matěj Kuzník	Decision (unanimous) (30–27, 30–27, 30–27)	3	5:00
Welterweight	Máté Kertész	def.	Ammari Diedrick	Decision (unanimous) (30–27, 30–27, 30–27)	3	5:00
Catchweight (196 lb)	Ondřej Raška	def.	Michal Kotalík	TKO (foot injury)	2	0:28	(Note: Kotalík missed weight (197.5 lb).)
Free Prelims (YouTube)
Featherweight	Marco Novák	def.	Michal Konrád	TKO (punches and elbows)	2	4:07

== Oktagon 51: Tipsport Gamechanger Final ==
Oktagon 51: Tipsport Gamechanger Final
- Promotion: Oktagon MMA
- Date: December 29, 2023
- Venue: O2 Arena
- City: Prague, Czech Republic

Oktagon 51: Tipsport Gamechanger Final was a mixed martial arts event held by Oktagon MMA on December 29, 2023, in Prague, Czech Republic.

=== Background ===
The Tipsport Gamechanger 1 welterweight tournament final between Bojan Veličković and Andreas Michailidis headlined the event. While, an interim Oktagon Middleweight Championship bout between Vlasto Čepo and Piotr Wawrzyniak served as the co-main event.

=== Results ===
Main card (DAZN)
Weight class				Method	Round	Time	Notes
Welterweight	Bojan Veličković	def.	Andreas Michailidis	Submission (rear-naked choke)	3	3:21	(Note: Oktagon Welterweight Tournament Final.)
Middleweight	Piotr Wawrzyniak	def.	Vlasto Čepo	TKO (punches)	3	3:19	(Note: For the interim Oktagon Middleweight Championship.)
Catchweight (195 lb)	Samuel Krištofič	def.	Karlos Vémola	KO (punch)	1	1:48
Light Heavyweight	Daniel Škvor	def.	Martin Zawada	Decision (unanimous) (30–27, 30–27, 30–27)	3	5:00
Welterweight	Stefano Paternò	def.	Ion Surdu	Submission (armbar)	2	2:37	(Note: Surdu missed weight (172 lb).)
Preliminary card (DAZN)
Catchweight (150 lb)	Karol Ryšavý	def.	Henrique Madureira	TKO (punches)	1	1:59
Women's Strawweight	Eva Dourthe	def.	Chiara Penco	Decision (unanimous) (29–28, 29–28, 29–28)	3	5:00	(Note: Oktagon Women's Strawweight title eliminator.)
Featherweight	Radek Roušal	def.	Kallum Parker	Decision (unanimous) (29–28, 29–28, 29–28)	3	5:00
Catchweight (121 lb)	Mallory Martin	def.	Magdaléna Šormová	Decision (split) (29–28, 28–29, 29–28)	3	5:00
Free Prelims (YouTube)
Lightweight	Hassan Shaaban	def.	Tomáš Fiala	KO (flying knee)	1	1:58	(Note: Shaaban missed weight (157.6 lb).)

== See also ==
- List of current Oktagon MMA fighters
- 2023 in UFC
- 2023 in Bellator MMA
- 2023 in Professional Fighters League
- 2023 in ONE Championship
- 2023 in Absolute Championship Akhmat
- 2023 in Rizin Fighting Federation
- 2023 in LUX Fight League
- 2023 in Konfrontacja Sztuk Walki
- 2023 in Brave Combat Federation
- 2023 in Legacy Fighting Alliance
- 2023 in UAE Warriors
