= 2024 in Oktagon MMA =

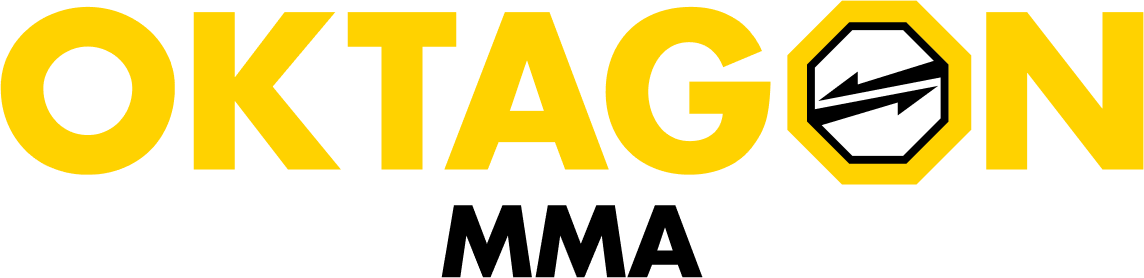

Information
- First date: January 27, 2024
- Last date: December 29, 2024

Events
- Total events: 13

Fights
- Total fights: 148
- Title fights: 9

Chronology
2023 in Oktagon MMA	2024 in Oktagon MMA	2025 in Oktagon MMA

The year 2024 was the 8th year in the history of the Oktagon MMA, a mixed martial arts promotion based in Czech Republic and Slovakia. 2024 begin with Oktagon 52.

== List of events ==
#	Event title	Date	Arena	Location
1	Oktagon 52: Mågård vs. Cartwright	Jan 27, 2024	Utilita Arena	Newcastle, England
2	Oktagon 53: Dalisda vs. Dourthe	Feb 10, 2024	Rudolf Weber-Arena	Oberhausen, Germany
3	Oktagon 54: Kincl vs. Wawrzyniak	Mar 2, 2024	Ostravar Aréna	Ostrava, Czech Republic
4	Oktagon 55: Jungwirth vs. Pukač 2	Mar 23, 2024	Hanns-Martin-Schleyer-Halle	Stuttgart, Germany
5	Oktagon 56: Aby vs. Creasey	Apr 20, 2024	Resorts World Arena	Birmingham, England
6	Oktagon 57: Eckerlin vs. Brož	May 4, 2024	Festhalle Frankfurt	Frankfurt, Germany
7	Oktagon 58: Vémola vs Végh 2	Jun 8, 2024	Fortuna Arena	Prague, Czech Republic
8	Oktagon 59: Summer Party	Jul 20, 2024	Peugeot Arena	Bratislava, Slovakia
9	Oktagon 60: Buchinger vs. Eskiev	Sep 7, 2024	Rudolf Weber-Arena	Oberhausen, Germany
10	Oktagon 61: Paradeiser vs. Duque	Sep 21, 2024	Winning Group Arena	Brno, Czech Republic
11	Oktagon 62: Bigger Than Ever	Oct 12, 2024	Deutsche Bank Park	Frankfurt, Germany
12	Oktagon 63: Buchinger vs. Nafuka	Nov 9, 2024	Tipos Aréna	Bratislava, Slovakia
13	Oktagon 64: Brito vs. Surdu	Dec 7, 2024	SAP Garden	Munich, Germany
14	Oktagon 65: Paradeiser vs. Keita 2	Dec 29, 2024	O2 Arena	Prague, Czech Republic

== Oktagon Lightweight 1 Million Euro Tournament ==
=== Background ===
Opening round
(England) Akonne Wanliss	KO
(Sweden) Sahil Siraj	1
(Poland) Mateusz Legierski	SUB
(Czech Republic) Matouš Kohout	1
(Germany) Hafeni Nafuka	3r.
(Serbia) Predrag Bogdanović	UD
(Belgium) Losene Keita	3
(Netherlands) Agy Sardari	UD
(Germany) Mohamed Grabinski	3
(Spain) Acoidan Duque	SD
(Finland) Makwan Amirkhani	3r.
(Austria) Mochamed Machaev	KO
(Slovakia) Ronald Paradeiser	SD
(Turkey) Attila Korkmaz	3
(Czech Republic) Vladimír Lengál	3
(Austria) Daniel Torres	UD

Quarter-finals
(England) Akonne Wanliss	3
(Poland) Mateusz Legierski	UD
(Serbia) Predrag Bogdanović	2
(Belgium) Losene Keita	TKO
(Spain) Acoidan Duque	UD
(Austria) Mochamed Machaev	3
(Slovakia) Ronald Paradeiser	UD
(Austria) Daniel Torres	3

Semi-finals
(Poland) Mateusz Legierski	3
(Belgium) Losene Keita	UD
(Spain) Acoidan Duque	1
(Slovakia) Ronald Paradeiser	TKO

Finals
(Belgium) Losene Keita	TKO
(Slovakia) Ronald Paradeiser (c)	2

== Oktagon 52: Mågård vs. Cartwright ==
Oktagon 52: Mågård vs. Cartwright
- Promotion: Oktagon MMA
- Date: January 27, 2024
- Venue: Utilita Arena
- City: Newcastle, England

Oktagon 52: Mågård vs. Cartwright was a mixed martial arts event held by Oktagon MMA on January 27, 2024, at the Utilita Arena in Newcastle, England.

=== Background ===
A bantamweight bout between former champion Jonas Mågård and former Cage Warriors Bantamweight champion Jack Cartwright headlined the event.

A lightweight bout between Shoaib Yousaf and Eduard Kexel was expected to take place at the event. However, Yousaf withdrew from the bout due to injury and was replaced by Rafael Hudson.

=== Results ===
Main card (DAZN)
Weight class				Method	Round	Time	Notes
Bantamweight	Jonas Mågård	def.	Jack Cartwright	Decision (unanimous) (30–27, 30–27, 30–27)	3	5:00	(Note: Oktagon Bantamweight title eliminator.)
Middleweight	Matěj Peňáz	def.	Matthew Bonner	TKO (punches to the body)	2	4:43
Flyweight	Aaron Aby	def.	Christopher Daniel	Decision (unanimous) (29–28, 29–28, 29–28)	3	5:00
Heavyweight	Stuart Austin	def.	Adam Pałasz	Submission (arm-triangle choke)	1	3:52
Featherweight	Max Holzer	def.	Corey Fry	Submission (rear-naked choke)	2	2:12
Preliminary card (DAZN)
Lightweight	Denis Frimpong	def.	Jan Široký	Decision (unanimous) (30–27, 30–27, 30–27)	3	5:00
Bantamweight	Roman Paulus	def.	Nathan Haywood	Submission (rear-naked choke)	3	4:05	(Note: Paulus missed weight (137.6 lb).)
Lightweight	Eduard Kexel	def.	Rafael Hudson Gomes	Submission (rear-naked choke)	1	4:29
Featherweight	Jake McHugh	def.	Armand Herczeg	Submission (rear-naked choke)	1	4:30
Free Prelims (YouTube)
Catchweight (137 lb)	Daniel Bainbridge	def.	Hamza Dagdeviren	Decision (unanimous) (29–28, 29–28, 30–27)	3	5:00

== Oktagon 53: Dalisda vs. Dourthe ==
Oktagon 53: Dalisda vs. Dourthe
- Promotion: Oktagon MMA
- Date: February 10, 2024
- Venue: Rudolf Weber-Arena
- City: Oberhausen, Germany

Oktagon 53: Dalisda vs. Dourthe was a mixed martial arts event held by Oktagon MMA on February 10, 2024, at the Rudolf Weber-Arena in Oberhausen, Germany.

=== Background ===
An Oktagon Women's strawweight Championship bout between reigning champion Katharina Dalisda and contender Eva Dourthe headlined the event.

=== Results ===
Main card (DAZN)
Weight class				Method	Round	Time	Notes
Women's Strawweight	Katharina Dalisda (c)	def.	Eva Dourthe	Decision (unanimous) (48–47, 48–47, 49–46)	5	5:00	(Note: For the Oktagon Women's Strawweight Championship.)
Welterweight	Islam Dulatov	def.	John Palaiologos	TKO (knee to the body)	1	4:59
Welterweight	Miroslav Brož	def.	Tom Crosby	Decision (split) (29–28, 28–29, 29–28)	3	5:00
Middleweight	David Zawada	def.	Hojat Khajevand	Submission (heel hook)	3	4:24
Welterweight	Ivica Trušček	def.	Cihad Akipa	Technical Submission (guillotine choke)	2	2:10
Preliminary card (DAZN)
Welterweight	Jan Malach	def.	Luka Milidragović	TKO (knee to the body and punches)	2	3:01
Featherweight	Gjoni Palokaj	def.	Jaroslav Pokorný	Decision (unanimous) (29–28, 29–28, 30–27)	3	5:00
Welterweight	Endrit Brajshori	def.	Jan Fajk	Submission (guillotine choke)	3	0:47
Welterweight	Emir-Can Al	def.	Tomáš Votava	KO (punches)	1	1:49
Free Prelims (YouTube)
Featherweight	Sami Zarabi	def.	Jakub Batfalský	Decision (unanimous) (30–27, 30–27, 30–27)	3	5:00

== Oktagon 54: Kincl vs. Wawrzyniak ==
Oktagon 54: Kincl vs. Wawrzyniak
- Promotion: Oktagon MMA
- Date: March 2, 2024
- Venue: Ostravar Aréna
- City: Ostrava, Czech Republic

Oktagon 54: Kincl vs. Wawrzyniak was a mixed martial arts event held by Oktagon MMA on March 2, 2024, at the Ostravar Aréna in Ostrava, Czech Republic.

=== Background ===
An unification Oktagon Middleweight Championship bout between reigning champion Patrik Kincl and interim champion Piotr Wawrzyniak headlined the event.

=== Results ===
Main card (DAZN)
Weight class				Method	Round	Time	Notes
Middleweight	Patrik Kincl (c)	def.	Piotr Wawrzyniak (ic)	Submission (arm-triangle choke)	3	1:50	(Note: For the Oktagon Middleweight Championship.)
Lightweight	Ronald Paradeiser	def.	Atilla Korkmaz	Decision (split) (28–29, 30–27, 29–28)	3	5:00	(Note: Oktagon Lightweight Tournament Round of 16.)
Lightweight	Mochamed Machaev	def.	Makwan Amirkhani	KO (punches)	3	0:06	(Note: Oktagon Lightweight Tournament Round of 16.)
Lightweight	Daniel Torres	def.	Vladimír Lengál	Decision (unanimous) (30–26, 30–26, 30–26)	3	5:00	(Note: Oktagon Lightweight Tournament Round of 16. Lengál was deducted one point in round 1 due to an illegal knee.)
Lightweight	Mateusz Legierski	def.	Matouš Kohout	Submission (rear-naked choke)	1	4:38	(Note: Oktagon Lightweight Tournament Round of 16.)
Lightweight	Acoidan Duque	def.	Marcel Grabinski	Decision (split) (29–28, 28–29, 29–28)	3	5:00	(Note: Oktagon Lightweight Tournament Round of 16.)
Lightweight	Predrag Bogdanović	def.	Hafeni Nafuka	Decision (unanimous) (30–27, 30–27, 30–27)	3	5:00	(Note: Oktagon Lightweight Tournament Round of 16.)
Preliminary card (DAZN)
Lightweight	Łukasz Rajewski	def.	Jason Ponet	Decision (split) (29–28, 28–29, 29–28)	3	5:00	(Note: Oktagon Lightweight Tournament Reserve bout.)
Free Prelims (YouTube)
Lightweight	Miloš Janičić	def.	Ebrahim Hosseinpour	TKO (knee)	2	1:23	(Note: Oktagon Lightweight Tournament Reserve bout; Hosseinpour missed weight (162.7 lb).)

== Oktagon 55: Jungwirth vs. Pukač 2 ==
Oktagon 55: Jungwirth vs. Pukač 2
- Promotion: Oktagon MMA
- Date: March 23, 2024
- Venue: Hanns-Martin-Schleyer-Halle
- City: Stuttgart, Germany

Oktagon 55: Jungwirth vs. Pukač 2 was a mixed martial arts event held by Oktagon MMA on March 23, 2024, at the Hanns-Martin-Schleyer-Halle in Stuttgart, Germany.

=== Background ===
A welterweight rematch between Christian Jungwirth and Robert Pukač headlined the event. The pair previously fought at Oktagon Prime 5 in March 2022, where Jungwirth won by TKO at the end of second-round.

=== Results ===
Main card (DAZN)
Weight class				Method	Round	Time	Notes
Welterweight	Christian Jungwirth	def.	Robert Pukač	Decision (unanimous) (50–45, 49–46, 50–45)	5	5:00
Light Heavyweight	Alexander Poppeck	def.	Jeremy Kimball	TKO (punches)	1	3:30	(Note: Kimball missed weight (213 lb).)
Welterweight	Máté Kertész	def.	Niklas Stolze	Submission (rear-naked choke)	2	2:42
Middleweight	Jamie Cordero	def.	Dominic Schober	Decision (unanimous) (30–27, 30–27, 30–27)	3	5:00
Heavyweight	Sebastian Herzberg	def.	Ruben Wolf	TKO (leg injury)	3	5:00
Lightweight	Arijan Topallaj	def.	Karol Ryšavý	KO (punches)	1	0:36
Preliminary card (DAZN)
Catchweight (163 lb)	Wahid Najand	def.	Jakub Bahník	Decision (split) (28–29, 29–28, 29–28)	3	5:00
Light Heavyweight	Jorick Montagnac	def.	Sebastian Heil	Decision (unanimous) (30–27, 30–27, 30–26)	3	5:00
Featherweight	Michael Deiga-Scheck	def.	Nikolaos Serbezis	KO (punch)	1	0:53
Women's Bantamweight	Lucia Szabová	def.	Róża Gumienna	Submission (armbar)	3	4:38
Catchweight (192 lb)	Ion Taburceanu	vs.	Nenad Avramović	No Contest (overturned)	2	5:00	(Note: Originally a TKO (retirement) win for Taburceanu; overturned after he tested positive for banned substance.)
Free Prelims (YouTube)
Women's Strawweight	Jacinta Austin	def.	Karolina Wójcik	Decision (unanimous) (30–27, 29–28, 30–27)	3	5:00

== Oktagon 56: Aby vs. Creasey ==
Oktagon 56: Aby vs. Creasey
- Promotion: Oktagon MMA
- Date: April 20, 2024
- Venue: Resorts World Arena
- City: Birmingham, England

Oktagon 56: Aby vs. Creasey was a mixed martial arts event held by Oktagon MMA on April 20, 2024, at the Resorts World Arena in Birmingham, England.

=== Background ===
A rematch for the vacant Oktagon Flyweight Championship between former title challenger Aaron Aby and former Cage Warriors Flyweight champion Sam Creasey headlined the event. The pair previously fought at Cage Warriors 123 in June 2021, where Creasey won via unanimous decision.

=== Results ===
Main card (DAZN)
Weight class				Method	Round	Time	Notes
Flyweight	Sam Creasey	def.	Aaron Aby	Decision (unanimous) (50–45, 50–45, 50–45)	5	5:00	(Note: For the vacant Oktagon Flyweight Championship.)
Lightweight	Akonne Wanliss	def.	Sahil Siraj	KO (punch)	1	0:48	(Note: Oktagon Lightweight Tournament Round of 16.)
Catchweight (150 lb)	Shem Rock	def.	Stefano Catacoli	Submission (rear-naked choke)	1	4:47
Light Heavyweight	Will Fleury	def.	Daniel Škvor	Submission (arm-triangle choke)	2	1:14
Welterweight	Andrej Kalašnik	def.	Liam Etebar	TKO (punched)	1	0:43
Lightweight	George Staines	def.	Tomáš Cigánik	Decision (unanimous) (29–26, 29–27, 29–27)	3	5:09
Preliminary card (DAZN)
Featherweight	James Hendin	def.	Jakub Dohnal	TKO (elbows and punches)	2	4:43
Lightweight	Denis Frimpong	def.	Callum Mullen	Decision (unanimous) (30–27, 30–27, 30–27)	3	5:00
Middleweight	Mick Stanton	def.	Kamil Wojciechowski	TKO (punches)	3	4:01
Welterweight	Ammari Diedrick	def.	Daniel Hromek	KO (punches)	1	4:56	(Note: Hromek missed weight (172.6 lb).)
Catchweight (157 lb)	Bakhtyaar Oryakhail	def.	Mbaye Gaye	TKO (submission to elbows)	3	2:04
Free Prelims (YouTube)
Women's Flyweight	Aitana Álvarez	def.	Megan Morris	Decision (unanimous) (30–27, 30–27, 30–26)	3	5:00

== Oktagon 57: Eckerlin vs. Brož ==
Oktagon 57: Eckerlin vs. Brož
- Promotion: Oktagon MMA
- Date: May 4, 2024
- Venue: Festhalle
- City: Frankfurt, Germany

Oktagon 57: Eckerlin vs. Brož is a mixed martial arts event held by Oktagon MMA on May 4, 2024, at the Festhalle in Frankfurt, Germany.

=== Background ===
An Oktagon Heavyweight Championship bout between reigning champion Hatef Moeil and #1 contender Stuart Austin was expected to headline the event. However, Moeil withdrew from the fight due to elbow injury. As a results, a 176-pound catchweight bout between Christian Eckerlin and Miroslav Brož was promoted to the main event status.

=== Results ===
Main card (DAZN)
Weight class				Method	Round	Time	Notes
Catchweight (176 lb)	Christian Eckerlin	def.	Miroslav Brož	TKO (elbows)	2	4:49
Lightweight	Losene Keita	def.	Agy Sardari	Decision (unanimous) (29–28, 29–28, 29–28)	3	5:00	(Note: Oktagon Lightweight Tournament Round of 16.)
Light Heavyweight	Pavol Langer	def.	Marc Doussis	KO (knee and punches)	1	4:06
Bantamweight	Farbod Iran Nezhad	def.	Mate Sanikidze	Decision (unanimous) (30–27, 30–27, 30–27)	3	5:00
Welterweight	Louis Glismann	def.	Łukasz Siwiec	Decision (unanimous) (29–28, 29–27, 29–27)	3	5:00
Welterweight	Matouš Kohout	def.	Islam Khapilaev	Decision (unanimous) (29–27, 29–28, 29–28)	3	5:00
Preliminary card (DAZN)
Catchweight (150 lb)	Max Holzer	def.	Eemil Kurhela	Submission (rear-naked choke)	2	1:53
Flyweight	Beno Adamia	def.	Stipe Brčić	Decision (unanimous) (29–28, 29–28, 29–28)	3	5:00
Women's Strawweight	Mallory Martin	def.	Anita Bekus	Decision (unanimous) (30–27, 30–27, 30–27)	3	5:00
Welterweight	Endrit Brajshori	def.	Tayo Odunjo	Decision (split) (29–28, 28–29, 29–28)	3	5:00
Women's Bantamweight	Laura Kirtzel	def.	Sandra Peterhoff	Submission (rear-naked choke)	1	2:09	(Note: Projekt Y Bantamweight Semifinal.)
Free Prelims (YouTube)
Women's Bantamweight	Haifa Reso	def.	Erika Tomm	TKO (punches)	3	2:06	(Note: Projekt Y Bantamweight Semifinal.)

== Oktagon 58: Vémola vs Végh 2 ==
Oktagon 58: Vémola vs Végh 2
- Promotion: Oktagon MMA
- Date: June 8, 2024
- Venue: Fortuna Arena
- City: Prague, Czech Republic

Oktagon 58: Vémola vs Végh 2 was a mixed martial arts event held by Oktagon MMA on June 8, 2024, at the Fortuna Arena in Prague, Czech Republic.

=== Background ===
An Oktagon Light Heavyweight Championship between reigning champion Karlos Vemola and former Bellator Light Heavyweight champion Attila Végh headlined the event. The pair previously fought at Oktagon 15 in November 2019, where Végh won via knockout in the first round.

=== Results ===
Main card (DAZN)
Weight class				Method	Round	Time	Notes
Light Heavyweight	Karlos Vemola (c)	def.	Attila Végh	Submission (arm-triangle choke)	2	0:45	(Note: For the Oktagon Light Heavyweight Championship.)
Welterweight	Ion Surdu	def.	David Kozma	KO (punches)	1	2:27
Middleweight	Marek Mazúch	def.	David Zawada	KO (punches)	1	1:15
Lightweight	Shem Rock	def.	Jaroslav Pokorný	Technical Submission (rear-naked choke)	1	3:06
Preliminary card (DAZN)
Lightweight	Mateusz Legierski	def.	Akonne Wanliss	Decision (unanimous) (30–27, 29–28, 30–27)	3	5:00	(Note: Oktagon Lightweight Tournament Quarterfinal.)
Catchweight (194 lb)	Miloš Petrášek	def.	Kamil Wojciechowski	Decision (unanimous) (30–27, 30–27, 30–27)	3	5:00
Lightweight	Acoidan Duque	def.	Mochamed Machaev	Decision (unanimous) (29–28, 29–28, 29–28)	3	5:00	(Note: Oktagon Lightweight Tournament Quarterfinal.)
Welterweight	Amiran Gogoladze	def.	Leandro Silva	Decision (split) (29–28, 28–29, 30–27)	3	5:00
Featherweight	Deniz Ilbay	def.	Denis Tripšanský	KO (knee and punches)	2	2:16
Free Prelims (YouTube)
Lightweight	Attila Korkmaz	def.	Makwan Amirkhani	Submission (rear-naked choke)	3	3:37	(Note: Oktagon Lightweight Tournament Reserve bout.)

== Oktagon 59: Summer Party ==
Oktagon 59: Summer Party
- Promotion: Oktagon MMA
- Date: July 20, 2024
- Venue: Peugeot Arena
- City: Bratislava, Slovakia

Oktagon 59: Summer Party was a mixed martial arts event held by Oktagon MMA on July 20, 2024, at the Peugeot Arena in Bratislava, Slovakia.

=== Background ===
The event marked the promotion's twelve visit to Bratislava and first since OKTAGON 47 in October 2023.

A rematch for the OKTAGON Bantamweight Championship between champion Felipe Lima and former champion and #1 contender, Jonas Magard, was expected to headline the event. The pairing previously fought at OKTAG0N 45 Special in June 2023, where Lima won via decision. On June 18, Lima activated clausula in his contract and left organization to step in on short notice at UFC on ABC: Whittaker vs. Aliskerov against Muhammad Naimov in featherweight bout.

=== Results ===
Main card (DAZN)
Weight class				Method	Round	Time	Notes
Lightweight	Ronald Paradeiser	def.	Daniel Torres	Decision (unanimous) (30–27, 30–27, 30–26)	3	5:00	(Note: Oktagon Lightweight Tournament Quarterfinal.)
Lightweight	Losene Keita	def.	Predrag Bogdanović	TKO (punch to the body)	2	4:15	(Note: Oktagon Lightweight Tournament Quarterfinal.)
Lightweight	Ivan Buchinger	def.	Łukasz Rajewski	Submission (ninja choke)	2	1:11	(Note: Oktagon Lightweight Tournament Reserve bout.)
Catchweight (130 lb)	Lucia Szabová	def.	Aitana Álvarez	Decision (unanimous) (30–27, 30–27, 30–26)	3	5:00
Middleweight	Petr Kníže	def.	Radovan Úškrt	Submission (arm-triangle choke)	2	3:47
Preliminary card (DAZN)
Middleweight	Piotr Wawrzyniak	def.	Andreas Michailidis	Decision (split) (28–29, 29–28, 29–28)	3	5:00
Catchweight (150 lb)	Marco Novák	def.	Radek Roušal	Decision (unanimous) (29–28, 29–28, 29–28)	3	5:00
Bantamweight	Jonas Mågård	def.	Josh Hill	Decision (unanimous) (30–27, 30–27, 30–27)	3	5:00
Middleweight	Milan Ďatelinka	def.	Ondřej Raška	KO (punch)	1	0:14
Free Prelims (YouTube)
Women's Flyweight	Veronika Smolková	def.	Jovana Đukić	TKO (punches)	2	2:26

== Oktagon 60: Buchinger vs. Eskiev ==
Oktagon 60: Buchinger vs. Eskiev
- Promotion: Oktagon MMA
- Date: September 7, 2024
- Venue: Rudolf Weber-Arena
- City: Oberhausen, Germany

Oktagon 60: Buchinger vs. Eskiev was a mixed martial arts event held by Oktagon MMA on September 7, 2024, at the Rudolf Weber-Arena in Oberhausen, Germany.

=== Background ===
A lightweight bout between former Oktagon Featherweight and Lightweight Champion Ivan Buchinger and Lom-Ali Eskiev headlined the event.

=== Results ===
Main card (DAZN)
Weight class				Method	Round	Time	Notes
Lightweight	Lom-Ali Eskiev	def.	Ivan Buchinger	TKO (punches)	1	4:10
Welterweight	Niklas Stolze	def.	Matouš Kohout	TKO (flying knee and punches)	1	2:04
Middleweight	Jamie Cordero	vs.	Milan Ďatelinka	No Contest (illegal elbow)	1	0:34	(Note: Accidental elbow to the back of the head rendered Ďatelinka unable to continue.)
Lightweight	Jakub Bahník	def.	Marcel Mohamed Grabinski	Decision (split) (30–27, 28–29, 30–27)	3	5:00
Welterweight	Wahed Nazhand	def.	Max Handanagić	Technical Submission (rear-naked choke)	1	3:00
Catchweight (152 lb)	Gjoni Palokaj	def.	Karol Jesus Arteaga	Decision (unanimous) (30–27, 30–27, 29–28)	3	5:00
Preliminary card (DAZN)
Welterweight	Hassan Shaaban	def.	Kevin Enz	Decision (split) (29–28, 28–29, 29–28)	3	5:00
Middleweight	Cihad Akipa	def.	Dominic Schober	Decision (unanimous) (29–28, 29–28, 29–28)	3	5:00
Welterweight	Daniel Hromek	def.	Emir-Can Al	Decision (unanimous) (30–27, 29–28, 29–28)	3	5:00
Welterweight	Marek Bartl	def.	Zoran Solaja	TKO (elbow and punches)	1	2:53
Free Prelims (YouTube)
Women's Bantamweight	Laura Kirtzel	def.	Haifa Reso	Decision (split) (29–28, 28–29, 29–28)	3	5:00

== Oktagon 61: Paradeiser vs. Duque ==
Oktagon 61: Paradeiser vs. Duque
- Promotion: Oktagon MMA
- Date: September 21, 2024
- Venue: Winning Group Arena
- City: Brno, Czech Republic

Oktagon 61: Paradeiser vs. Duque was a mixed martial arts event held by Oktagon MMA on September 21, 2024, at the Winning Group Arena in Brno, Czech Republic.

=== Background ===
The two semifinals of Oktagon Lightweight Tournament took place at the event. At the weigh-ins, Acoidan Duque weighed in at 158 pounds, two pounds over the lightweight tournament limit and he was fined a percent of his purse which go to Ronald Paradeiser.

The co-main event was a middleweight bout between Makhmud Muradov and former KSW Middleweight Champion Scott Askham.

=== Results ===
Main card (DAZN)
Weight class				Method	Round	Time	Notes
Bantamweight	Ronald Paradeiser	def.	Acoidan Duque	KO (punches)	1	1:28	(Note: Oktagon Lightweight Tournament Semifinal; Duque missed weight (158 lb).)
Middleweight	Makhmud Muradov	def.	Scott Askham	Decision (unanimous) (30–27, 30–27, 30–27)	3	5:00
Lightweight	Losene Keita	def.	Mateusz Legierski	Decision (unanimous) (29–28, 30–27, 29–28)	3	5:00	(Note: Oktagon Lightweight Tournament Semifinal.)
Women's Bantamweight	Lucie Pudilová	def.	Cecilie Maria Bolander	Decision (split) (29–28, 28–29, 29–28)	3	5:00
Welterweight	Andrej Kalašnik	def.	John Palaiologos	Decision (unanimous) (29–27, 29–27, 29–27)	3	5:00
Lightweight	Vladimír Lengál	def.	Corey Fry	TKO (knee and punches)	2	2:25
Preliminary card (DAZN)
Catchweight (209 lb)	Tomáš Hron	def.	Fred Sikking	TKO (doctor stoppage)	1	3:00	(Note: Special Rules bout.)
Bantamweight	Jack Cartwright	def.	Mate Sanikidze	Decision (unanimous) (29–28, 29–28, 29–28)	3	5:00
Lightweight	George Staines	def.	Jakub Tichota	Decision (unanimous) (30–27, 30–27, 30–27)	3	5:00
Featherweight	Radek Roušal	def.	Nezar Bahaji	Decision (unanimous) (29–28, 30–27, 30–27)	3	5:00
Lightweight	Agy Sardari	def.	Attila Korkmaz	Decision (unanimous) (30–27, 29–28, 30–27)	3	5:00	(Note: Oktagon Lightweight Tournament Reserve bout.)
Free Prelims (YouTube)
Lightweight	Jan Stanovský	def.	Gleb Shadrin	Decision (unanimous) (29–28, 29–28, 29–28)	3	5:00

== Oktagon 62: Bigger Than Ever ==
Oktagon 62: Bigger Than Ever
- Promotion: Oktagon MMA
- Date: October 12, 2024
- Venue: Deutsche Bank Park
- City: Frankfurt, Germany

Oktagon 62: Bigger Than Ever was a mixed martial arts event held by Oktagon MMA on October 12, 2024, at the Deutsche Bank Park in Frankfurt, Germany.

=== Background ===
A welterweight bout between Christian Jungwirth and Christian Eckerlin headlined the event. They also competed for the symbolic "King of Germany" title.

The co-main event took place an Oktagon Middleweight Championship bout between current champion Patrik Kincl and Kerim Engizek.

=== Results ===
Main card (DAZN)
Weight class				Method	Round	Time	Notes
Welterweight	Christian Eckerlin	def.	Christian Jungwirth	Decision (unanimous) (50–45, 50–45, 50–45)	5	5:00	(Note: For the symbolic "King of Germany" title.)
Middleweight	Kerim Engizek	def.	Patrik Kincl (c)	Decision (unanimous) (49–46, 49–46, 48–47)	5	5:00	(Note: For the Oktagon Middleweight Championship.)
Lightweight	Max Coga	def.	Antun Račić	TKO (knee and punches)	2	1:41
Lightweight	Niko Samsonidse	def.	Daniel Torres	Submission (rear-naked choke)	2	4:07	(Note: Torres missed weight (149.3 lb).)
Heavyweight	Lazar Todev	def.	Adam Pałasz	TKO (punches)	2	2:19	(Note: Oktagon Heavyweight title eliminator.)
Featherweight	Max Holzer	def.	Mohammed Sadok Trabelsi	TKO (punches)	1	3:23
Preliminary card (DAZN)
Women's Strawweight	Mallory Martin	def.	Katharina Dalisda (c)	Decision (unanimous) (50–45, 50–45, 49–46)	5	5:00	(Note: For the Oktagon Women's Strawweight Championship.)
Featherweight	Mochamed Machaev	def.	James Hendin	Decision (unanimous) (30–27, 29–28, 29–28)	3	5:00
Light Heavyweight	Will Fleury	def.	Pavol Langer	KO (punch)	1	1:31
Lightweight	Hafeni Nafuka	def.	Arijan Topallaj	Decision (unanimous) (30–27, 30–27, 30–27)	3	5:00	(Note: Topallaj missed weight (159.8 lb).)
Free Prelims (YouTube)
Featherweight	Deniz Ilbay	def.	Michael Deiga-Scheck	TKO (punches)	1	3:19

== Oktagon 63: Buchinger vs. Nafuka ==
Oktagon 63: Buchinger vs. Nafuka
- Promotion: Oktagon MMA
- Date: November 9, 2024
- Venue: Tipos Aréna
- City: Bratislava, Slovakia

Oktagon 63: Buchinger vs. Nafuka will be a mixed martial arts event held by Oktagon MMA on November 9, 2024, at the Tipos Aréna in Bratislava, Slovakia.

=== Results ===
Main card (DAZN)
Weight class				Method	Round	Time	Notes
Lightweight	Ivan Buchinger	def.	Hafeni Nafuka	TKO (punches)	2	3:23
Catchweight (176 lb)	Leandro Silva	def.	Máté Kertész	Decision (unanimous) (29–28, 29–28, 30–27)	3	5:00
Catchweight (175 lb)	Robert Pukač	def.	Ammari Diedrick	Decision (unanimous) (29–28, 29–28, 30–27)	3	5:00
Featherweight	Gjoni Palokaj	def.	Karol Ryšavý	Decision (unanimous) (30–27, 29–28, 29–28)	3	5:00
Catchweight (159 lb)	Damien Lapilus	def.	František Fodor	TKO (body kick and punches)	1	1:19	(Note: Lapilus missed weight (160.3 lb).)
Flyweight	Zhalgas Zhumagulov	def.	Aaron Aby	Decision (unanimous) (30–26, 30–26, 30–26)	3	5:00
Preliminary card (DAZN)
Catchweight (150 lb)	Jack Maguire	def.	Radek Roušal	Decision (unanimous) (30–27, 30–27, 30–27)	2	3:44
Catchweight (139 lb)	Roman Paulus	def.	Janne Elonen-Kulmala	Submission (rear-naked choke)	3	2:12
Women's Flyweight	Veronika Smolková	def.	Mileide Simplicio	TKO (punches)	1	1:06
Free Prelims (YouTube)
Catchweight (159 lb)	Tomáš Cigánik	def.	Kevin Enz	Decision (unanimous) (30–27, 30–27, 30–27)	3	5:00

== Oktagon 64: Brito vs. Surdu ==
Oktagon 64: Brito vs. Surdu
- Promotion: Oktagon MMA
- Date: December 7, 2024
- Venue: SAP Garden
- City: Munich, Germany

Oktagon 64: Brito vs. Surdu was a mixed martial arts event held by Oktagon MMA on December 7, 2024, at the SAP Garden in Munich, Germany.

=== Results ===
Main card (DAZN)
Weight class				Method	Round	Time	Notes
Welterweight	Ion Surdu	def.	Kaik Brito	KO (head kick)	1	2:34	(Note: For the vacant Oktagon Welterweight Championship.)
Light Heavyweight	Alexander Poppeck	vs.	Mateusz Strzelczyk	No Contest (illegal knee)	1	2:28	(Note: Accidental illegal knee rendered Strzelczyk unable to continue.)
Catchweight (150 lb)	Max Holzer	def.	Eugen Black-Dell	Decision (unanimous) (30–27, 30–27, 30–27)	3	5:00
Heavyweight	Patrick Vespaziani	def.	Sebastian Herzberg	TKO (punches)	1	2:57
Catchweight (150 lb)	Jakub Dohnal	def.	Michael Deiga-Scheck	Submission (rear-naked choke)	3	2:43
Preliminary card (DAZN)
Middleweight	Jamie Cordero	def.	Ion Taburceanu	Submission (kimura)	1	1:00
Catchweight (161 lb)	Gökhan Aksu	def.	Jan Malach	Submission (rear-naked choke)	1	3:28
Welterweight	Marek Bartl	def.	Endrit Brajshori	Submission (reserve triangle choke)	1	2:57
Free Prelims (YouTube)
Lightweight	Fedor Duric	def.	Jan Stanovský	Decision (unanimous) (30–27, 30–27, 30–27)	3	5:00

== Oktagon 65: Paradeiser vs. Keita 2 ==
Oktagon 65: Paradeiser vs. Keita 2
- Promotion: Oktagon MMA
- Date: December 29, 2024
- Venue: O2 Arena
- City: Prague, Czech Republic

Oktagon 65: Paradeiser vs. Keita 2 will be a mixed martial arts event held by Oktagon MMA on December 29, 2024, at the O2 Arena in Prague, Czech Republic.

=== Background ===
The final of the Oktagon Lightweight Tournament is expected to take place at this event.

=== Results ===
Main card (DAZN)
Weight class				Method	Round	Time	Notes
Lightweight	Losene Keita	def.	Ronald Paradeiser (c)	TKO (elbow and punches)	2	4:02	(Note: Oktagon Lightweight Tournament Final. For the Oktagon Lightweight Championship.)
Light Heavyweight	Will Fleury	def.	Karlos Vémola (c)	Decision (unanimous) (50–44, 50–44, 50–44)	5	5:00	(Note: For the Oktagon Light Heavyweight Championship.)
Women's Bantamweight	Cecilie Maria Bolander	def.	Lucie Pudilová	Decision (split) (48–47, 47–48, 48–47)	5	5:00	(Note: For the inaugural Oktagon Women's Bantamweight Championship.)
Bantamweight	Igor Severino	def.	Jonas Mågård	Decision (split) (29–28, 28–29, 29–28)	3	5:00
Middleweight	Daniel Schwindt	def.	Radovan Úškrt	TKO (punches)	2	2:23
Preliminary card (DAZN)
Lightweight	Agy Sardari	def.	Ognjen Dimić	Submission (rear-naked choke)	2	1:13
Lightweight	Ozan Aslaner	def.	Jakub Tichota	Decision (split) (29–28, 28–29, 29–28)	3	5:00
Featherweight	Marco Novák	def.	Eemil Kurhela	Decision (unanimous) (29–28, 29–28, 30–27)	3	5:00
Welterweight	Peter Gabal	def.	Benny Bajrami	Decision (unanimous) (30–26, 30–26, 29–27)	3	5:00
Free Prelims (YouTube)
Featherweight	Jakub Batfalský	def.	Dominik Toporcer	TKO (punches)	1	1:41

== See also ==
- List of current Oktagon MMA fighters
- 2024 in UFC
- 2024 in Bellator MMA
- 2024 in Professional Fighters League
- 2024 in ONE Championship
- 2024 in Absolute Championship Akhmat
- 2024 in Rizin Fighting Federation
- 2024 in LUX Fight League
- 2024 in Konfrontacja Sztuk Walki
- 2024 in Brave Combat Federation
- 2024 in Legacy Fighting Alliance
- 2024 in UAE Warriors
