= Losene Keita =

Guinean mixed martial artist (born 1997)

- Born: December 30, 1997 (age 28); Conakry, Guinea
- Other names: Black Panther
- Nationality: Belgian
- Height: 5 ft 9 in (175 cm)
- Weight: 154 lb (70 kg)
- Division: Featherweight; Lightweight; Welterweight
- Fighting out of: Kortrijk, West Flanders, Belgium
- Team: Lamiro Fight Club
- Years active: 2019–present

Mixed martial arts record
- Total: 20
- Wins: 17
- By knockout: 11
- By decision: 6
- Losses: 3
- By knockout: 2
- By decision: 1

Other information
- Mixed martial arts record from Sherdog

Losene Keita (born December 30, 1997) is a Guinean-born Belgian mixed martial artist. He currently competes in the Featherweight division of the Ultimate Fighting Championship (UFC). He most notably competed in the Featherweight and Lightweight divisions of Oktagon MMA, where he was the former two-time Oktagon Lightweight Champion and Oktagon Featherweight Champion, along with holding the interim titles in both divisions.

== Early life ==
Keita was born in Conakry, Guinea and lived there until he was 11. Then he moved with his family to Paris in France and moved to Kortrijk in Belgium and lives there to this day. Keita holds both Belgian and French nationalities. As a child, he played basketball and football. He also had trouble dealing with emotions at school, which is why he constantly got into fights. Even on the streets, he got into a lot of trouble, which is why the police constantly showed up at his doorstep. All the bad things that Keita did led to him being imprisoned for four months. After he got out, he continued to get into street fights because of his reputation. A friend of Keita's saw talent in him, eventually inviting him to a mixed martial arts club. After some thought and consideration, Keita agreed to go there and after his first training session, he became addicted to the discipline of MMA.

== Mixed martial arts career ==
=== Early career ===
After two months of training, he had his first fight, having over eight amateur fights in total, after which he turned professional in 2019 because no one else would continue to fight him as an amateur.

On March 5, 2019, in his professional debut, he defeated Gracjan Golebiowski by a decision at Strength & Honor Championship 15 in Dessel. Until his 6th professional fight, Keita fought exclusively in the welterweight and then lightweight, apart from some amateur fights.

He won his second professional fight again on points, this time against Karol Michalak at Atlas MMA 6, which took place in the Netherlands.

In his last, third fight in 2019, Keita defeated the more experienced Soufiene Oudin by the same verdict at Ultimate Contest in December.

Keita fought his next three fights for the Dutch promotion World Fighting League (WFL). He knocked out his opponents three times in the first rounds, including Tayron Chavarro, Raymond Jarman and Bartosz Gorczyca. Keita won the WFL welterweight championship by defeating Gorcyzca.

=== Oktagon MMA ===
In 2021, Keita signed with Oktagon MMA in the lightweight division. In his debut for this promotion, Keita faced Karol Ryšavý on December 4, 2021, at Oktagon 29. He won the bout by knockout after less than three minutes of the first round.

Keita faced former Oktagon MMA lightweight title contender, Ronald Paradeiser on February 26, 2022, at Oktagon 31. He won the bout by unanimous decision.

Keita, being on a two-fight winning streak for Oktagon MMA, got a chance to fight for the title against the double champion in two weight categories (lightweight and featherweight), Ivan Buchnger. At Oktagon 33 on June 4, 2022, he faced Buchinger for the lightweight title, winning it with a technical knockout after strong blows under the belt. Keits fought his next fight on his birthday in 202 BC under May Hai rules, at Oktagon 38, in which he faced kickboxer Milan Paleš. There was no championship title at stake in the fight. This fight was so even after three rounds that instead of a potential draw, it went to a fourth, overtime round, after which Keita won by unanimous decision.

Keita faced Samuel Bark on February 11, 2023, at Oktagon 39. He won the bout by TKO in the third round.

Keita was scheduled to face featherweight champion Mate Sanikidze on April 29, 2023, at Oktagon 42. However, Sanikidze withdrew due to a shoulder injury and was replaced by Jakub Tichota. Keita won the bout by TKO in the fourth round to win the interim featherweight title.

The match between Keita and Sanikidze was rebooked on July 29, 2023, at Oktagon 45. Mushida lost the bout by TKO in the first round due to an unexpected foot injury.

In his next fight, Keita faced Niko Samsonidse for the Oktagon featherweight title on December 9, 2023, at Oktagon 50, he won the bout by TKO in the second round to win the title.

Keita faced Agy Sardari on May 4, 2024, at Oktagon 57, in the second edition of the Tipsport Gamechange, dubbed the Oktagon Lightweight Tournament. Keita won the bout by unanimous decision on points.

Keita faced Predrag Bogdanović on July 20, 2024, at Oktagon 59: Summer Party, during the quarterfinal of the lightweight tournament. He won the bout by knockout in the second round.

Heading to the semi-finals, Keita faced Mateusz Legierski on September 21, 2024, at Oktagon 61. He won the bout by unanimous decision, advancing to the tournament final.

Keita faced Ronald Paradeiser in the lightweight tournament final on December 29, 2024, at Oktagon 65, in which the lightweight championship was also on the line. He won the bout by TKO to win the lightweight title and tournament.

=== Ultimate Fighting Championship ===
On August 15, 2025, it was reported that Keita had signed with the Ultimate Fighting Championship.

Keita was scheduled to make his promotional debut against Patrício Pitbull on September 6, 2025, at UFC Fight Night 258. However at the weigh-ins, Keita weighed in at 149 pounds, three pounds over the division's non-title fight limit, resulting in the cancellation of the bout.

Keita faced Nathaniel Wood on March 21, 2026, at UFC Fight Night 270. He lost the fight by split decision.

Keita faced Muhammad Naimov on September 5, 2026, at UFC Fight Night 287. He won the fight by knockout in the first round. This fight earned him his first $100,000 Performance of the Night award.

Replacing Arnold Allen who withdrew due to an injury, Keita faced Aaron Pico on October 24, 2026 at UFC 333. He lost the fight by technical knockout in the first round.

== Championships and accomplishments ==
=== Mixed martial arts ===
- Oktagon MMA
  - Oktagon MMA Lightweight Champion (Two times)
  - Oktagon MMA Featherweight Champion (One time)
  - 2024 Oktagon Lightweight Tournament champion
  - First simultaneous two-weight Champion in Oktagon MMA history
- World Fighting League
  - WFL Welterweight Championship (One time)
- Cageside Press
  - 2022 African Prospect of the Year
- Ultimate Fighting Championship
  - Performance of the Night (One time) vs. Muhammad Naimov

== Mixed martial arts record ==
Professional record breakdown
20 matches	17 wins	3 losses
By knockout	11	2
By decision	6	1

Res.	Record	Opponent	Method	Event	Date	Round	Time	Location	Notes
Loss	17–3	Aaron Pico	TKO (punches)	UFC 333	October 24, 2026	1	1:14	Abu Dhabi, United Arab Emirates	
Win	17–2	Muhammad Naimov	KO (punch)	UFC Fight Night: Hooker vs. Parnasse	September 5, 2026	1	2:54	Paris, France	Performance of the Night.
Loss	16–2	Nathaniel Wood	Decision (split)	UFC Fight Night: Evloev vs. Murphy	March 21, 2026	3	5:00	London, England	Return to Featherweight.
Win	16–1	Ronald Paradeiser	TKO (elbow and punches)	Oktagon 65	December 29, 2024	2	1:02	Prague, Czech Republic	Won the Oktagon Lightweight Championship and the Oktagon Lightweight Tournament. Performance of the Night.
Win	15–1	Mateusz Legierski	Decision (unanimous)	Oktagon 61	September 21, 2024	3	5:00	Brno, Czech Republic	Oktagon Lightweight Tournament Semifinal.
Win	14–1	Predrag Bogdanović	TKO (punch to the body)	Oktagon 59	July 20, 2024	2	4:15	Bratislava, Slovakia	Oktagon Lightweight Tournament Quarterfinal.
Win	13–1	Agy Sardari	Decision (unanimous)	Oktagon 57	May 4, 2024	3	5:00	Frankfurt, Germany	Return to Lightweight. Oktagon Lightweight Tournament Round of 16.
Win	12–1	Niko Samsonidse	KO (punches)	Oktagon 50	December 9, 2023	2	0:23	Ostrava, Czech Republic	Won the vacant Oktagon Featherweight Championship.
Loss	11–1	Mate Sanikidze	TKO (leg injury)	Oktagon 45	July 29, 2023	1	1:08	Prague, Czech Republic	For the Oktagon Featherweight Championship.
Win	11–0	Jakub Tichota	TKO (punch)	Oktagon 42	April 29, 2023	4	3:53	Bratislava, Slovakia	Won the interim Oktagon Featherweight Championship.
Win	10–0	Samuel Bark	TKO (punches)	Oktagon 39	February 11, 2023	1	0:30	Munich, Germany	Featherweight debut. Performance of the Night.
Win	9–0	Ivan Buchinger	TKO (punches)	Oktagon 33	June 4, 2022	1	3:00	Frankfurt, Germany	Won and unified the Oktagon Lightweight Championship.
Win	8–0	Ronald Paradeiser	Decision (unanimous)	Oktagon 31	February 26, 2022	5	5:00	Prague, Czech Republic	Won the interim Oktagon Lightweight Championship.
Win	7–0	Karol Ryšavý	KO (punch)	Oktagon 29	December 4, 2021	1	2:55	Ostrava, Czech Republic	Lightweight debut.
Win	6–0	Bartosz Gorczyca	KO (punch)	World Fighting League 6	August 15, 2021	1	N/A	Eindhoven, Netherlands	Won the WFL Welterweight Championship.
Win	5–0	Raymond Jarman	KO (punch)	World Fighting League 5	May 30, 2020	1	N/A	IJsselstein, Netherlands	
Win	4–0	Tayron Chavarro	TKO (punches)	World Fighting League 4	February 16, 2020	1	N/A	Hoofddorp, Netherlands	
Win	3–0	Soufiene Oudina	Decision (unanimous)	Team Bushido: Ultimate Contest 11	December 7, 2019	3	5:00	Wevelgem, Belgium	
Win	2–0	Karol Michalak	Decision (unanimous)	Atlas MMA 6	November 2, 2019	3	5:00	Eindhoven, Netherlands	
Win	1–0	Gracjan Golebiowski	Decision (unanimous)	Strength and Honour 15	October 5, 2019	3	5:00	Dessel, Belgium	Welterweight debut.

== Muay Thai record ==
Muay Thai record
1 Win
Date	Result	Opponent	Event	Location	Method	Round	Time
2022-12-30	Win	(Slovakia) Milan Paleš	Oktagon 38	Prague, Czech Republic	Decision (unanimous)	4	5:00
Legend: Win Loss Draw/No contest Notes
