= Leandro Silva (fighter) =

Brazilian mixed martial arts fighter

- Born: November 11, 1985 (age 40); São Paulo, Brazil
- Other names: Buscapé; Apollo
- Height: 5 ft 9 in (1.75 m)
- Weight: 155 lb (70 kg; 11.1 st)
- Division: Lightweight; Welterweight
- Reach: 72 in (183 cm)
- Style: Brazilian Jiu-Jitsu
- Team: American Top Team (2015–present)
- Rank: Black belt in Brazilian Jiu-Jitsu under Rocian Gracie
- Years active: 2008–present

Mixed martial arts record
- Total: 44
- Wins: 30
- By knockout: 3
- By submission: 12
- By decision: 15
- Losses: 12
- By decision: 12
- Draws: 1
- No contests: 1

Other information
- Mixed martial arts record from Sherdog

Leandro Silva (born November 11, 1985) is a Brazilian professional mixed martial artist who competed in the lightweight and welterweight divisions of the Ultimate Fighting Championship.

== Mixed martial arts career ==
Silva began training in Muay Thai at the age of 20, transitioning to mixed martial arts a couple of years later. He compiled a professional record of 11–1–1 before signing with the UFC in May 2013.

=== Ultimate Fighting Championship ===
Silva made his promotional debut as a short notice replacement against Ildemar Alcântara on June 8, 2013, at UFC on Fuel TV 10. Silva lost the fight via unanimous decision.

After a string of victories on the regional circuit, Silva returned to the UFC against Francisco Trinaldo on September 13, 2014, at UFC Fight Night 51. Silva lost the fight via unanimous decision.

Silva next faced Charlie Brenneman on November 8, 2014, at UFC Fight Night 56. Silva defeated Brenneman via submission in the first round.

Silva faced Drew Dober on March 21, 2015, at UFC Fight Night 62. Silva won the fight via technical submission in the second round. Silva was attempting to secure a guillotine choke after dropping to the mat with Dober's neck secured in his arm. Dober defended and moved his body to the side to stave off being caught in the choke. Silva appeared to be losing his grip on the submission as Dober continued to work free. However, the referee stepped in and touched the fighters as if to motion that he was standing them up. In reality, he was stopping the fight due to submission despite the fact that Dober never tapped and was in no significant danger of being choked out from the hold. The fight was later overturned to a no contest by the Brazilian MMA Athletic Commission (CABMMA) after the referee Eduardo Herdy admitted his mistake.

Silva faced promotional newcomer Lewis Gonzalez on June 27, 2015, at UFC Fight Night 70. Silva won the fight via unanimous decision.

Silva faced Efraín Escudero on November 21, 2015, at The Ultimate Fighter Latin America 2 Finale. Silva won the fight by unanimous decision.

Silva next faced Jason Saggo on June 18, 2016, at UFC Fight Night 89. Silva lost the fight via split decision.

Silva next faced Rustam Khabilov on September 3, 2016, at UFC Fight Night 93, replacing an injured Reza Madadi. Silva lost the fight by unanimous decision and was subsequently released from the promotion.

=== Absolute Championship Berkut ===
After being released, Silva signed with ACB and made his promotional debut against Pat Healy on January 13, 2017, at ACB 51: Silva vs. Torgeson. He won the fight via TKO in the first round.

Silva was expected to face Musa Khamanaev on 20 May 2017 at ACB 61. But Khamanev pulled out from the event.

Silva faced Joshua Aveleson July 23, 2017, at ACB 65. He lost the fight via unanimous decision.

Silva then faced Islam Makoev at ACB 73: Silva vs. Makoev on October 21, 2017. He won the fight via unanimous decision.

Silva faced Ali Bagov at ACB 80: Tumenov vs. Burrell on February 16, 2018. He lost the fight via unanimous decision.

Silva faced Paulo Goncalves Silva in the inaugural Kumite 1 League event on September 28, 2018. He won the fight via unanimous decision.

Silva faced Tilek Mashrapov at Titan FC 52: Soares vs. Uruguai on January 25, 2019. He won the fight via second-round technical knockout.

Silva then faced Maxim Shvets at ProFC 65 on May 19, 2019. He lost the fight via unanimous decision.

=== Oktagon MMA ===
Silva faced Robert Bryczek at OKTAGON 15 on November 9, 2019. He won the fight via unanimous decision.

Silva faced Alex Lohoré at OKTAGON 21 on January 30, 2021. He won the fight via split decision.

Silva faced David Kozma at OKTAGON 24 on May 29, 2021. He lost the fight via unanimous decision.

Silva, as a replacement for Micah Terrill, faced Magomed Umalatov on August 13, 2021, at PFL 7. At weigh-ins, Silva weighed in at 172.5 pounds, missing weight by 1.5 pounds. The bout proceeded at catchweight and he was fined 20% of his purse, which went to Umalatov. He lost the bout via unanimous decision.

Silva faced Bojan Veličković on October 15, 2022, at Oktagon 36. He won the bout via split decision.

Silva faced Andreas Michailidis on March 4, 2023, at Oktagon 40 in the Oktagon Welterweight Tournament Round of 16, losing the bout via unanimous decision.

Silva faced Mohamed Grabinski on September 16, 2023, at Oktagon 46, submitting him in the third round via rear-naked choke.

Silva faced Christian Ecklerlin on November 18, 2023 at Oktagon 49, winning the bout via unanimous decision.

== Mixed martial arts record ==
Professional record breakdown
44 matches	30 wins	12 losses
By knockout	3	0
By submission	12	0
By decision	15	12
Draws	1	
No contests	1	

Res.	Record	Opponent	Method	Event	Date	Round	Time	Location	Notes
Win	30–12–1 (1)	Liam Etebar	Submission (neck crank)	Real Fight Arena 22	April 26, 2025	1	N/A	Trenčín, Slovakia	Catchweight (176 lb) bout.
Win	29–12–1 (1)	Máté Kertész	Decision (unanimous)	Oktagon 63	November 9, 2024	3	5:00	Bratislava, Slovakia	Catchweight (176 lb) bout.
Loss	28–12–1 (1)	Amiran Gogoladze	Decision (split)	Oktagon 58	June 8, 2024	3	5:00	Prague, Czech Republic	
Win	28–11–1 (1)	Christian Eckerlin	Decision (unanimous)	Oktagon 49	November 18, 2023	3	5:00	Cologne, Germany	
Win	27–11–1 (1)	Marcel Mohamed Grabinski	Submission (rear-naked choke)	Oktagon 46	September 16, 2023	3	4:34	Frankfurt, Germany	Oktagon Welterweight Tournament Reserve bout; Grabinski missed weight (173.9 lb).
Loss	26–11–1 (1)	Andreas Michailidis	Decision (unanimous)	Oktagon 40	March 4, 2023	3	5:00	Ostrava, Czech Republic	Oktagon Welterweight Tournament Round of 16.
Win	26–10–1 (1)	Bojan Veličković	Decision (split)	Oktagon 36	October 15, 2022	3	5:00	Frankfurt, Germany	
Loss	25–10–1 (1)	Magomed Umalatov	Decision (unanimous)	PFL 7 (2021)	August 13, 2021	3	5:00	Hollywood, Florida, United States	Catchweight (172.5 lb) bout; Silva missed weight.
Loss	25–9–1 (1)	David Kozma	Decision (unanimous)	Oktagon 24	May 29, 2021	5	5:00	Brno, Czech Republic	For the Oktagon Welterweight Championship.
Win	25–8–1 (1)	Alex Lohoré	Decision (split)	Oktagon 21	January 30, 2021	3	5:00	Brno, Czech Republic	Catchweight (176 lb) bout; Silva missed weight (178 lb).
Win	24–8–1 (1)	Robert Bryczek	Decision (unanimous)	Oktagon 15	November 9, 2019	3	5:00	Prague, Czech Republic	
Loss	23–8–1 (1)	Maxim Shvets	Decision (unanimous)	ProFC 65	May 19, 2019	3	5:00	Rostov-on-Don, Russia	
Win	23–7–1 (1)	Tilek Mashrapov	TKO (punches)	Titan FC 52	January 25, 2019	2	4:39	Fort Lauderdale, Florida, United States	Return to Welterweight.
Win	22–7–1 (1)	Paulo Bananada	Decision (unanimous)	Kumite 1 League	September 30, 2018	3	5:00	Mumbai, India	
Loss	21–7–1 (1)	Ali Bagov	Decision (unanimous)	ACB 80	February 16, 2018	3	5:00	Krasnodar, Russia	
Win	21–6–1 (1)	Islam Makoev	Decision (unanimous)	ACB 73	October 21, 2017	3	5:00	Rio de Janeiro, Brazil	
Loss	20–6–1 (1)	Joshua Aveles	Decision (unanimous)	ACB 65	July 22, 2017	3	5:00	Sheffield, England	
Win	20–5–1 (1)	Pat Healy	TKO (punches)	ACB 51	January 13, 2017	1	0:38	Irvine, California, United States	
Loss	19–5–1 (1)	Rustam Khabilov	Decision (unanimous)	UFC Fight Night: Arlovski vs. Barnett	September 3, 2016	3	5:00	Hamburg, Germany	
Loss	19–4–1 (1)	Jason Saggo	Decision (split)	UFC Fight Night: MacDonald vs. Thompson	June 18, 2016	3	5:00	Ottawa, Ontario, Canada	
Win	19–3–1 (1)	Efraín Escudero	Decision (unanimous)	The Ultimate Fighter Latin America 2 Finale: Magny vs. Gastelum	November 21, 2015	3	5:00	Monterrey, Mexico	
Win	18–3–1 (1)	Lewis Gonzalez	Decision (unanimous)	UFC Fight Night: Machida vs. Romero	June 27, 2015	3	5:00	Hollywood, Florida, United States	Welterweight bout; Gonzalez missed weight (174 lb).
NC	17–3–1 (1)	Drew Dober	NC (overturned)	UFC Fight Night: Maia vs. LaFlare	March 21, 2015	2	2:45	Rio de Janeiro, Brazil	Originally a submission (guillotine choke) win for Silva; overturned after review due to a referee error.
Win	17–3–1	Charlie Brenneman	Submission (rear-naked choke)	UFC Fight Night: Shogun vs. Saint Preux	November 8, 2014	1	4:15	Uberlândia, Brazil	Performance of the Night.
Loss	16–3–1	Francisco Trinaldo	Decision (unanimous)	UFC Fight Night: Bigfoot vs. Arlovski	September 13, 2014	3	5:00	Brasília, Brazil	
Win	16–2–1	Gilson Lomanto	TKO (head kick and punches)	MMA Super Heroes 5	August 2, 2014	1	3:50	São Paulo, Brazil	
Win	15–2–1	Lindeclecio Oliveira Batista	Submission (guillotine choke)	MMA Super Heroes 4	May 30, 2014	3	0:25	São Paulo, Brazil	
Win	14–2–1	Yoshiaki Takahashi	Decision (unanimous)	Pancrase 257	March 30, 2014	3	5:00	Yokohama, Japan	
Win	13–2–1	Carlos Leal Miranda	Decision (unanimous)	Talent MMA Circuit 5	November 23, 2013	3	5:00	Campinas, Brazil	
Win	12–2–1	Wilson Teixeira Nascimento	Submission (rear-naked choke)	Bitetti Combat 16	July 19, 2013	2	3:32	Rio de Janeiro, Brazil	
Loss	11–2–1	Ildemar Alcântara	Decision (unanimous)	UFC on Fuel TV: Nogueira vs. Werdum	June 8, 2013	3	5:00	Fortaleza, Brazil	Welterweight bout.
Win	11–1–1	Chris Wilson	Decision (split)	Predador FC 23	March 9, 2013	3	5:00	São José do Rio Preto, Brazil	Lightweight debut.
Win	10–1–1	Gilmar Dutra Lima	Decision (unanimous)	Nitrix Champion Fight 12	August 18, 2012	3	5:00	Blumenau, Brazil	
Win	9–1–1	Franklin Jensen	Decision (unanimous)	Nitrix Champion Fight 11	May 5, 2012	3	5:00	Joinville, Brazil	
Win	8–1–1	Celso Bezerra	Submission (rear-naked choke)	The Coliseum 1	April 13, 2012	1	2:02	Ribeirão Preto, Brazil	
Win	7–1–1	Julio Rafael Rodrigues	Submission (rear-naked choke)	Valiant FC 8	December 8, 2011	2	1:29	Porto Alegre, Brazil	
Draw	6–1–1	Gilmar Dutra Lima	Draw	Kumite MMA Combate 1	October 28, 2011	3	5:00	Porto Alegre, Brazil	
Win	6–1	Lourenco Filho	Submission (rear-naked choke)	Super Power Combat 1	October 8, 2011	1	1:27	Barueri, Brazil	
Win	5–1	Marcio Alves	Submission (rear-naked choke)	Fight Stars 1	September 14, 2011	2	3:03	São Paulo, Brazil	
Win	4–1	Deivid Santos	Submission (arm-triangle choke)	Full Heroes Battle 4	June 25, 2011	1	3:09	Paranaguá, Brazil	
Win	3–1	Fernando Lima	Technical Submission (arm-triangle choke)	Amerad Fighter 1	June 17, 2011	2	2:01	Guarujá, Brazil	
Win	2–1	Osmar Osmar	Submission (armbar)	Blessed Fight 2	May 22, 2009	2	3:20	São Paulo, Brazil	
Loss	1–1	André Santos	Decision (unanimous)	Kawai Arena 1	December 13, 2008	3	5:00	São José dos Campos, Brazil	
Win	1–0	Viscardi Andrade	Decision (unanimous)	Beach Fight Festival 1	May 10, 2008	3	5:00	São Vicente, Brazil	Welterweight debut.

=== Mixed martial arts exhibition record ===
Exhibition record breakdown		
1 match	0 wins	1 loss
By decision	0	1

Res.	Record	Opponent	Method	Event	Date	Round	Time	Location	Notes
Loss	0–1	David Vieira	Decision (unanimous)	The Ultimate Fighter: Brazil 2	N/A	2	5:00	São Paulo, Brazil	TUF: Brazil 2 house entry bout.

== See also ==
- List of male mixed martial artists
