= Francisco Albano Barrio =

Croatian mixed martial artist

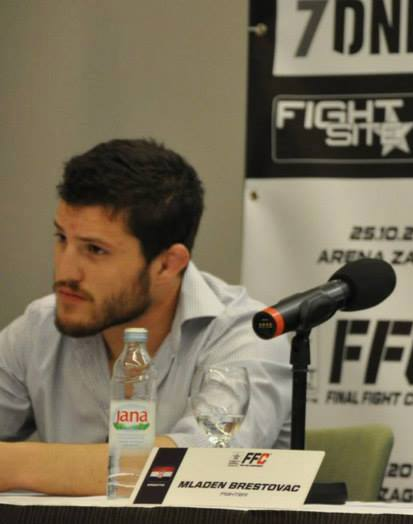
- Born: Francisco Albano Barrio; 22 June 1989 (age 37); Buenos Aires, Argentina
- Other names: El Croata
- Nationality: Argentine-Croatian
- Height: 5 ft 7 in (170 cm)
- Weight: 145 lb (66 kg)
- Division: Lightweight
- Style: Greco-Roman wrestling
- Fighting out of: Zagreb, Croatia
- Team: SBG Ireland; American Top Team Zagreb
- Years active: 2012–present

Mixed martial arts record
- Total: 20
- Wins: 16
- By knockout: 2
- By submission: 9
- By decision: 5
- Losses: 4
- By knockout: 3
- By decision: 1

Other information
- Mixed martial arts record from Sherdog

Francisco Albano Barrio
Medal record

Representing Argentina

Greco-Roman wrestling

ALBA Games
Bronze medal – third place	2011 Caracas, Venezuela	74 kg

Pan American Championship
Bronze medal – third place	2017 Salvador, Bahia, Brazil	71 kg
Bronze medal – third place	2010 Monterrey, Mexico	74 kg

South American Games
Gold medal – first place	2010 Medellin, Colombia	66 kg

Pan American Championship
Silver medal – second place	2008 Cuenca, Ecuador	66 kg

Pan American Championship
Silver medal – second place	2007 Maracaibo, Venezuela	66 kg

Francisco Albano Barrio (born 22 June 1989), commonly known as Croata Barrio, is an Argentina-born Croatian mixed martial artist who competes in the Lightweight division of KSW.

== Background ==
Barrio was born in Buenos Aires, Argentina. In 1994, he and his family moved to Zagreb, Croatia. It was here that he began Greco-Roman wrestling, in which he competed for the Argentina national team from 2005 to 2012. Today, he is a professional mixed martial artist and is signed with Final Fight Championship, one of the fastest growing MMA promotions in Europe.

== Greco-Roman Wrestling career ==
At the age of seven, Barrio became interested in the sport, and practiced various disciplines. He began training in Lokomotiva Wrestling Club, Zagreb. He soon started to win tournaments, which led to him participating in national championships, and then in international events. In Croatia, he gained experience by competing regularly with wrestlers from all across Europe. He stood out as a wrestler with great potential.

At seventeen he returned with his family to their home country, Argentina, where he continued with the training activities. He has managed several victories both locally and internationally, Multiple Argentine champion in the junior and senior categories, being undefeated in the 66 kg category. He excelled in international competitions such as the Pan American and South American, taking three medals in the first tournament and two in the second.

He competed in various international tournaments in America, Asia and Europe, and later in the Olympic Wrestling trials in Orlando, Florida ahead of the 2012 games in London. He lost on points in a close fight against Wuileixis Rivas, in which the winner qualified directly to the Olympic Games.

Francisco accumulated over 100 wins in all his Greco-Roman Wrestling career.

He competed in Croatian Wrestling League, in -74 kg weight category, on 12 October 2013 while preparing for his Final Fight Championship debut. In 2nd league round he scored victory for Lokomotiva Wrestling Club, the same club where he made his first steps in wrestling.

== Mixed martial arts career ==
=== Early career ===
Francisco Barrio started his mixed martial arts career while training at Nova União and the Pana Wrestling Team in Buenos Aires. His debut was in the lightweight division, on 14 July 2012, at Real Combat Conviction. He won via submission, with a rear-naked choke just 1:14 into the first round.

On 20 October 2012, Francisco win Alexander Ceballos via Submission (keylock). At KIF 2 - Killer Instinct Fight 2, Croata defeated Esteban Zuñiga via TKO in first round.

=== FFC ===
On 27 June 2013, Croata signed with the European MMA promotion, Final Fight Championship. Francisco won in his Final Fight Championship debut by unanimous decision against Darko Banović in the Featherweight division. Francisco next defeated Patrick Peresa, after 54 seconds of the third round, by submission (Rear-Naked Choke) at FFC13.

The official public page of Final Fight Championship announced that Francisco will fight Vaso Bakočević in FFC on 31 October 2014, in a featherweight title eliminator. The fight failed to materialize, and Barrio was rescheduled to fight Filip Pejić at FFC 15. Pejić won the fight by a first-round knockout.

After his loss to Pejić, Barrio took a five-year break from the sport. He returned in December 2019, when he was scheduled to fight Adi Duraković at FNC 2. The fight ended after 18 seconds, as Duraković collapsed to the floor. Barrio fought again at FNC 3, against Aleksandar Janković. He beat Janković by a third-round submission via neck crank.

=== KSW ===
Barrio signed with KSW on 31 October 2020, and faced Mateusz Legierski at KSW 56: Polska vs. Chorwacja on 14 November 2020. He lost the fight via majority decision. His second fight with KSW came at KSW 58: Kołecki vs. Zawada, when he faced Bartłomiej Kopera. Barrio won the fight by unanimous decision.

Barrio was scheduled to face Vaso Bakočević at FNC: Armagedon Quarterfinals on 11 September 2021. He won the fight by a first-round submission.

Barrio stepped in as a short notice opponent for Łukasz Rajewski at KSW 70: Pudzianowski vs. Materla on 28 May 2022. He won the bout via rear-naked choke in the second round.

Barrio faced Maciej Kazieczko at KSW 76: Parnasse vs. Rajewski on 12 November 2022. He lost the fight by a third-round knockout.

Barrio stepped in as a short notice opponent for Aymard Guih at XTB KSW 93: Parnasse vs Mircea on 6 April 2024, in Paris and lost by Split Decision.

== Personal life ==
Francisco is son of popular brigadier Rodolfo Barrio Saavedra who was actively involved in the Croatian War of Independence.

== Rankings ==
- Barrio was ranked second in division at the 2007 Pan American Championship in Maracaibo, Venezuela
- Barrio was ranked second in the 2008 Pan American Championship in Ecuador.
- Barrio was ranked 20th World Championship held in Beijing, China
- Barrio was ranked third in the 2010 Pan American Championship in Monterrey, Mexico
- Barrio was ranked number one in the 2010 South American Games.
- Argentinian champion: 2006, 2007, 2008, 2009, 2010, 2011 and 2012.
- 2014 No. 7 prospect in the world up to 66 kg.

=== Honors ===
- Olimpia de plata: 2008.
- Revelacion Clarin: 2010.

== Mixed martial arts record ==
Professional record breakdown
21 matches	16 wins	5 losses
By knockout	2	3
By submission	9	0
By decision	5	2

Res.	Record	Opponent	Method	Event	Date	Round	Time	Location	Notes
Win	16–5	Fabiano Silva	Decision (unanimous)	FNC 33	12 September 2026	3	5:00	Zagreb, Croatia	
Loss	15–5	Lom-Ali Eskiev	KO (punches)	FNC 27	7 February 2026	1	4:20	Munich, Germany	Lost the FNC Lightweight Championship.
Win	15–4	Antun Račić	Submission (arm-triangle choke)	FNC 22	12 April 2025	2	3:00	Ljubljana, Slovenia	Won the vacant FNC Lightweight Championship.
Win	14–4	Bojan Kosednar	Decision (unanimous)	FNC 20	23 November 2024	3	5:00	Zagreb, Croatia	Catchweight (160 lb) bout.
Win	13–4	Dušan Džakić	Decision (unanimous)	FNC 17	1 June 2024	3	5:00	Belgrade, Serbia	
Loss	12–4	Aymard Guih	Decision (Split)	KSW 93	6 April 2024	3	5:00	Paris, France	Catchweight (161 lb) bout.
Win	12–3	Vaso Bakočević	Submission (rear-naked choke)	FNC 13	4 November 2023	2	3:24	Belgrade, Serbia	Welterweight debut.
Win	11–3	Arlen Ribeiro	Submission (rear-naked choke)	FNC 10	4 March 2023	3	3:31	Ljubuški, Bosnia and Herzegovina	Won the vacant FNC Lightweight Championship.
Loss	10–3	Maciej Kazieczko	KO (punches)	KSW 76	12 November 2022	3	3:20	Grodzisk Mazowiecki, Poland	Fight of the Night.
Win	10–2	Łukasz Rajewski	Submission (rear-naked choke)	KSW 70	28 May 2022	2	2:51	Łódź, Poland	Catchweight (163 lb) bout.
Win	9–2	Vaso Bakočević	Technical Submission (guillotine choke)	FNC: Armagedon 2 Semifinals	11 September 2021	1	1:00	Šibenik, Croatia	
Win	8–2	Bartłomiej Kopera	Decision (unanimous)	KSW 58	30 January 2021	3	5:00	Łódź, Poland	
Loss	7–2	Mateusz Legierski	Decision (majority)	KSW 56	14 November 2020	3	5:00	Łódź, Poland	Catchweight (161 lb) bout.
Win	7–1	Aleksandar Janković	Submission (neck crank)	FNC 3	31 July 2020	3	2:19	Zagreb, Croatia	
Win	6–1	Adi Duraković	TKO (retirement)	FNC 2	14 December 2019	1	0:18	Zagreb, Croatia	
Loss	5–1	Filip Pejić	KO (punch)	Final Fight Championship 15	21 November 2014	1	4:20	Poreč, Croatia	Featherweight bout.
Win	5–0	Patrick Pereša	Submission (rear-naked choke)	Final Fight Championship 13	6 June 2014	3	0:50	Zadar, Croatia	Lightweight debut.
Win	4–0	Darko Banović	Decision (unanimous)	Final Fight Championship 8	25 October 2013	3	5:00	Zagreb, Croatia	
Win	3–0	Esteban Zuñiga	TKO (doctor stoppage)	Killer Instinct Fight 2	25 May 2013	1	1:05	Neuquen, Argentina	
Win	2–0	Alexander Ceballos	Submission (keylock)	Killer Instinct Fight 1	20 October 2012	1	3:35	Neuquen, Argentina	
Win	1–0	Santiago Mendez	Submission (rear-naked choke)	Conviction MMA 3	14 July 2012	1	0:51	Buenos Aires, Argentina	Featherweight debut.

== See also ==
- List of current KSW fighters
- List of male mixed martial artists
