= Mateusz Legierski =

Polish mixed martial artist (born 1996)

- Born: Mateusz Legierski; July 23, 1996 (age 30); Koniaków, Poland
- Other names: Dynamit
- Height: 5 ft 10 in (1.78 m)
- Weight: 155 lb (70 kg; 11 st 1 lb)
- Division: Lightweight (2018–present)
- Reach: 71.7 in (182 cm)
- Fighting out of: Koniaków, Poland
- Team: Octagon Team Cieszyn
- Years active: 2018–present

Mixed martial arts record
- Total: 16
- Wins: 14
- By knockout: 5
- By submission: 3
- By decision: 6
- Losses: 2
- By knockout: 1
- By submission: 0
- By decision: 1

Other information
- Mixed martial arts record from Sherdog

Mateusz Legierski (born July 23, 1996) is a Polish professional mixed martial artist. He currently competes in the Lightweight division of Oktagon MMA, where he is the current, two-time, and inaugural Lightweight Champion.

== Mixed martial arts career ==
=== Early career ===
Legierski made his professional debut on September 22, 2018 against Kamil Czyżewski. Legierski won the fight via a second-round TKO.

His next fight came a month later on October 27 against Konrad Furmanek. Legierski won the fight via a first-round submission.

=== Oktagon MMA ===
Legierski made his debut under Czech-based federation Oktagon MMA against Michal Konrád on March 16, 2019. Legierski won the fight via a first-round TKO.

His next fight came on June 8, 2019 against Ronald Paradeiser. Legierski won the fight via a second-round TKO.

His next fight came on November 9, 2019 against Jakub Bahník. Legierski won via a first-round knockout.

==== Inaugural Oktagon Lightweight Champion ====
Legierski faced Miroslav Štrbák for the inaugural Oktagon lightweight championship on February 15, 2020. Legierski won the fight via a split decision, becoming the inaugural champion, and winning his first career championship in the process.

=== Konfrontacja Sztuk Walki ===
Legierski returned to his native Poland after signing with Konfrontacja Sztuk Walki (KSW) on May 25, 2020, while vacating his Oktagon lightweight championship in the process.

Legierski was scheduled to face Roman Szymański in his promotional debut. The bout was later cancelled after Legierski withdrew due to injury, and was replaced with Filip Pejić.

His debut came on November 14, 2020 against Francisco Barrio. Legierski won the fight via a Majority Decision.

His final fight with the federation came on December 18, 2021 against Roman Szymański. Legierski lost the fight via a second-round TKO.

=== Return to Oktagon MMA ===
Legierski returned to Oktagon MMA on July 23, 2022 against Matouš Kohout. Legierski won the fight via a third-round submission.

His next fight came on May 20, 2023 against Matěj Kuzník. Legierski won the fight via a Unanimous Decision.

His next fight came on October 7, 2023 against Karol Ryšavý. Legierski won the fight via a Unanimous Decision.

==== Oktagon Lightweight Tournament ====
His next fight came on March 2, 2024 in a rematch against Matouš Kohout in the opening round of the Oktagon Lightweight Tournament. Legierski won the fight via a first-round submission.

In the quarterfinals, he faced Akonne Wanliss on June 8, 2024. Legierski won the fight via a Unanimous Decision.

In the semifinals, he faced Losene Keita on September 21, 2024. Legierski lost the fight via a Unanimous Deicision.

==== Oktagon MMA Lightweight Champion ====
Following a fourteen-month hiatus, Legierski returned on November 22, 2025 where he faced Attila Korkmaz for the vacant Oktagon lightweight championship. Legierski won the fight via a Unanimous Decision, winning the championship for the second time in his career.

== Championships and accomplishments ==
=== Mixed martial arts ===
- Oktagon MMA
  - Oktagon lightweight championship (Two time; current; inaugural)

== Mixed martial arts record ==
Professional record breakdown
16 matches	14 wins	2 losses
By knockout	5	1
By submission	3	0
By decision	6	1

Res.	Record	Opponent	Method	Event	Date	Round	Time	Location	Notes
Win	14–2	Gökhan Aksu	TKO (punches)	Oktagon 90	June 20, 2026	1	3:23	Berlin, Germany	Defended the Oktagon Lightweight Championship.
Win	13–2	Attila Korkmaz	Decision (unanimous)	Oktagon 80	November 22, 2025	5	5:00	Munich, Germany	Won the vacant Oktagon Lightweight Championship.
Loss	12–2	Losene Keita	Decision (unanimous)	Oktagon 61	September 21, 2024	3	5:00	Brno, Czech Republic	Oktagon Lightweight Tournament Semifinal.
Win	12–1	Akonne Wanliss	Decision (unanimous)	Oktagon 58	June 8, 2024	3	5:00	Prague, Czech Republic	Oktagon Lightweight Tournament Quarterfinal.
Win	11–1	Matouš Kohout	Submission (rear-naked choke)	Oktagon 54	March 2, 2024	1	4:38	Ostrava, Czech Republic	Oktagon Lightweight Tournament Round of 16.
Win	10–1	Karol Ryšavý	Decision (unanimous)	Oktagon 47	October 7, 2023	3	5:00	Bratislava, Slovakia	
Win	9–1	Matěj Kuzník	Decision (unanimous)	Oktagon 43	May 20, 2023	3	5:00	Prague, Czech Republic	
Win	8–1	Matouš Kohout	Submission (rear-naked choke)	Oktagon 34	July 23, 2022	3	2:56	Prague, Czech Republic	Catchweight (160 lb) bout.
Loss	7–1	Roman Szymański	TKO (punches)	KSW 65	December 18, 2021	2	4:47	Gliwice, Poland	
Win	7–0	Francisco Barrio	Decision (majority)	KSW 56	November 14, 2020	3	5:00	Łódź, Poland	Catchweight (161 lb) bout.
Win	6–0	Miroslav Štrbák	Decision (split)	Oktagon Prime 3	February 15, 2020	5	5:00	Šamorín, Slovakia	Won the inaugural Oktagon Lightweight Championship.
Win	5–0	Jakub Bahník	KO (punch)	Oktagon 15	November 9, 2019	1	1:46	Prague, Czech Republic	
Win	4–0	Ronald Paradeiser	TKO (punches)	Oktagon 12	June 8, 2019	2	1:41	Bratislava, Slovakia	
Win	3–0	Michal Konrád	TKO (punches)	Oktagon 11	March 16, 2018	1	4:47	Ostrava, Czech Republic	Catchweight (163 lb) bout.
Win	2–0	Konrad Furmanek	Submission (triangle choke)	Gala Sportów Walki 9	October 27, 2018	1	2:03	Międzychód, Poland	
Win	1–0	Kamil Czyżewski	TKO (punches)	PLMMA 76	September 22, 2018	2	2:29	Białystok, Poland	Lightweight debut; Legierski missed weight (156.5 lb).

== Kickboxing record ==
Professional Kickboxing Record
1 Wins (1 (T)KO's), 0 Losses, 0 Draws
Date	Result	Opponent	Event	Location	Method	Round	Time
2018-06-16	Win	(Poland) Adam Piastowski	Silesian MMA 1	Mysłowice, Poland	KO (Flying Knee)	1	0:20

== See also ==
- List of current mixed martial arts champions
- List of current Oktagon MMA fighters
- List of male mixed martial artists
