= UFC Fight Night: Evloev vs. Murphy =

2026 mixed martial arts event in London

- The poster for UFC Fight Night: Evloev vs. Murphy
- Promotion: Ultimate Fighting Championship
- Date: March 21, 2026
- Venue: The O_{2} Arena
- City: London, England
- Attendance: 18,629
- Total gate: $4,520,137

Event chronology
UFC Fight Night: Emmett vs. Vallejos	UFC Fight Night: Evloev vs. Murphy	UFC Fight Night: Adesanya vs. Pyfer

UFC Fight Night: Evloev vs. Murphy (also known as UFC Fight Night 270) was a mixed martial arts event produced by the Ultimate Fighting Championship that took place on March 21, 2026, at The O_{2} Arena in London, England.

== Background ==
The event marked the promotion's 17th visit to London and first since UFC Fight Night: Edwards vs. Brady in March 2025.

A featherweight title eliminator bout between undefeated contenders Movsar Evloev and Lerone Murphy headlined the event. The bout featured a combined 36–0–1 record, the largest undefeated total for any matchup in UFC history.

A heavyweight bout between Mick Parkin and undefeated prospect Mario Pinto was scheduled for this event. However, Parkin withdrew for undisclosed reasons and was replaced by promotional newcomer Felipe Franco.

At the weigh-ins, two fighters missed weight:

- Ravena Oliveira weighed in at 116.5 pounds, half a pound over the women's strawweight non-title fight limit.
- Luana Carolina weighed in at 144 pounds, eight pounds over the women's bantamweight non-title fight limit.

Oliveira's bout proceeded at catchweight and she was fined a percentage of her individual purse which went to her opponent Shanelle Dyer. Carolina's bout against Melissa Mullins was cancelled as a result of the weight miss.

== Results ==
Main card (Paramount+)
Weight class				Method	Round	Time	Notes
Featherweight	Movsar Evloev	def.	Lerone Murphy	Decision (majority) (48–46, 48–46, 47–47)	5	5:00	(Note: UFC Featherweight title eliminator. Evloev was deducted one point in round 4 due to an illegal groin strike.)
Featherweight	Luke Riley	def.	Michael Aswell Jr.	Decision (unanimous) (30–27, 30–27, 30–27)	3	5:00
Welterweight	Michael Page	def.	Sam Patterson	Decision (unanimous) (30–27, 29–28, 29–28)	3	5:00
Light Heavyweight	Iwo Baraniewski	def.	Austen Lane	TKO (punches)	1	0:28
Middleweight	Christian Leroy Duncan	def.	Roman Dolidze	Decision (unanimous) (29–28, 29–28, 29–28)	3	5:00
Featherweight	Danny Silva	def.	Kurtis Campbell	TKO (punches)	2	0:31
Preliminary card (Paramount+)
Lightweight	Mason Jones	def.	Axel Sola	Decision (unanimous) (30–27, 29–28, 29–28)	3	5:00
Featherweight	Nathaniel Wood	def.	Losene Keita	Decision (split) (28–29, 29–28, 29–28)	3	5:00
Heavyweight	Mario Pinto	def.	Felipe Franco	Decision (unanimous) (29–28, 29–28, 29–28)	3	5:00
Middleweight	Mantas Kondratavičius	def.	Antonio Trócoli	Decision (unanimous) (30–27, 29–27, 29–27)	3	5:00
Heavyweight	Brando Peričić	def.	Louie Sutherland	TKO (punches)	1	1:48
Lightweight	Abdul-Kareem Al-Selwady	def.	Shaqueme Rock	Decision (unanimous) (30–27, 30–27, 30–27)	3	5:00
Catchweight (116.5 lb)	Shanelle Dyer	def.	Ravena Oliveira	TKO (knee and punches)	2	1:17

== Bonus awards ==
The following fighters received $100,000 bonuses. The other finishes received $25,000 additional bonuses.

- Fight of the Night: Mason Jones vs. Axel Sola
- Performance of the Night: Iwo Baraniewski and Shanelle Dyer

== See also ==
- List of UFC events
- List of current UFC fighters
- 2026 in UFC
