= Nathaniel Wood (fighter) =

English mixed martial artist (born 1993)

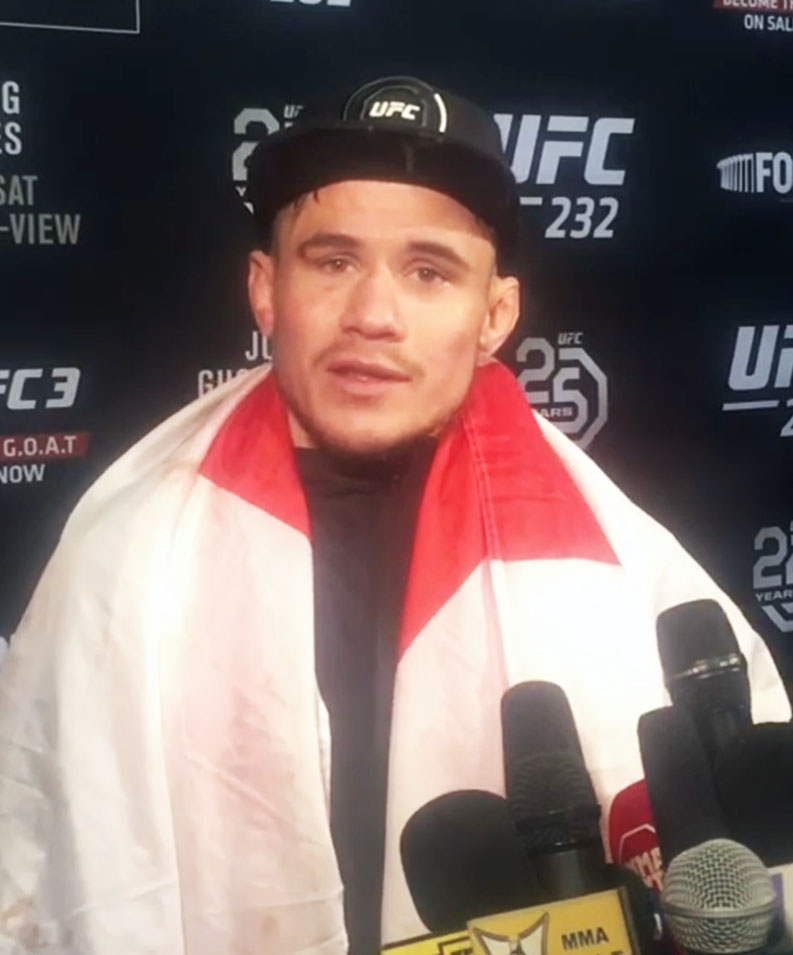
- Wood at UFC 232 in 2018
- Born: 5 August 1993 (age 33); London, England
- Other names: The Prospect, The Last Kingsman
- Height: 5 ft 6 in (1.68 m)
- Weight: 145 lb (66 kg)
- Division: Bantamweight (2012–2022); Featherweight (2022–present)
- Reach: 69 in (175 cm)
- Fighting out of: Morden, England
- Team: Nova Forca; Raptors Strike Force; Team Titan (2017–2019); Great Britain Top Team (2019–present)
- Trainer: Brad Pickett
- Rank: Black belt in Brazilian Jiu-Jitsu under Ashley Grimshaw
- Years active: 2011–present

Mixed martial arts record
- Total: 30
- Wins: 23
- By knockout: 8
- By submission: 5
- By decision: 10
- Losses: 7
- By knockout: 2
- By submission: 2
- By decision: 3

Other information
- Mixed martial arts record from Sherdog

Nathaniel Wood (born 5 August 1993) is an English professional mixed martial artist who competes in the Featherweight division of the Ultimate Fighting Championship (UFC). A professional competitor since 2012, he formerly competed for Cage Warriors, where he was the Bantamweight Champion. As of November 14, 2026, he is #15 in the Meta UFC featherweight rankings.

== Background ==
Growing up playing football, Wood followed his father to a Brazilian jiu-jitsu practice at the age of 16. He attended college for carpentry for a spell, but dropped out in order to pursue a career in mixed martial arts.

== Professional mixed martial arts career ==
=== Early career ===
Wood amassed a record of 8–3 record, before signing with Cage Warriors.

=== Cage Warriors Bantamweight champion ===
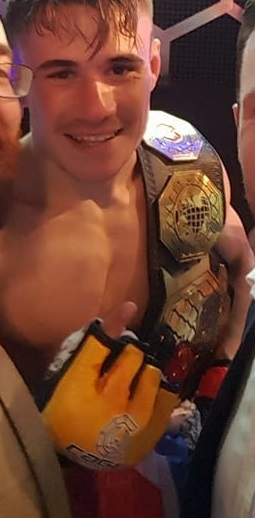
Nathaniel Wood won the Cage Warriors Bantamweight Championship

Wood was scheduled to face Vaughan Lee at CWFC 82 on 1 April 2017. They were originally scheduled to meet at CWFC 80, before the fight was postponed due to an anomaly found on Wood's brain in a pre-fight scan. Wood staggered Lee near the beginning of the second round, and pursued him for the remainder of the fight, knocking him out with a right straight at the 4:22 minute mark.

Following his dominant victory against Lee, Wood was scheduled to fight Marko Kovacevic for the vacant Cage Warriors Bantamweight Championship at CWFC 84 on 2 June 2017. Wood won the fight by a first-round technical knockout, after weathering some early counter right hands by Kovacic.

Wood was scheduled to make his first title defense against Josh Reed at CWFC 86 on 17 September 2017. Reed dominated the champion for the duration of the short-lived bout, surging forward with power shots and managing to drop Wood with a combination of punches. Wood however managed to stagger back to his feet and counter the onrushing Reed with a counter left, winning the fight by a first-round knockout.

Wood made his second and final title defense against Luca Iovine at CWFC 92 on 24 March 2018. Wood made quick work of the challenger, knocking him out with a left hook after just 50 seconds.

It was announced on 5 April 2018 that Wood had signed with the UFC.

=== Ultimate Fighting Championship ===
Wood made his promotional debut against Johnny Eduardo on 1 June 2018 at UFC Fight Night 131. He won the fight via submission in Round 2, for which he was awarded with a Performance of the Night bonus.

Wood was originally scheduled to face Tom Duquesnoy on 29 December 2018 at UFC 232. However, Dusquenoy pulled out due to an injury and was replaced by Andre Ewell. He won the bout via submission in the third round.

Wood faced José Alberto Quiñónez on 16 March 2019 at UFC Fight Night 147. He won the fight via a submission in round two.

Wood faced John Dodson on 15 February 2020 at UFC Fight Night 167. He lost the fight via TKO in round three.

Wood was scheduled to face Umar Nurmagomedov on 26 July 2020 at UFC on ESPN 14. However, Nurmagomedov withdrew from the bout due to his uncle Abdulmanap Nurmagomedov's passing He was replaced by promotional newcomer John Castañeda. Wood won the fight via unanimous decision.

Wood faced Casey Kenney on 24 October 2020 at UFC 254. He lost the back-and-forth fight via unanimous decision. This fight earned him the Fight of the Night award.

Wood was scheduled to face Jonathan Martinez on 4 September 2021 at UFC Fight Night 191. However, Wood was removed from the bout in mid-August for undisclosed reasons and replaced by Marcelo Rojo.

Wood was scheduled to face Liudvik Sholinian on 19 March 2022 at UFC Fight Night 204. However due to the Russian invasion of Ukraine, Sholinian was unable to leave the country or train so he was replaced by Vince Morales. In turn, just days before the event, Morales withdrew due to illness.

In his debut at featherweight, Wood faced Charles Rosa on 23 July 2022 at UFC Fight Night 208. He won the fight by unanimous decision.

Wood faced Charles Jourdain on 3 September 2022 at UFC Fight Night 209. He won the fight via unanimous decision.

Wood was scheduled to face Lerone Murphy on 18 March 2023 at UFC 286. However, Wood was forced to withdraw from the event due to leg injury.

Wood faced Andre Fili on 22 July 2023 at UFC Fight Night 224. He won the fight via unanimous decision.

Wood faced Muhammad Naimov on 21 October 2023, at UFC 294. He lost the fight via unanimous decision.

Wood faced Daniel Pineda on 27 July 2024, at UFC 304. He won the fight by unanimous decision.

Wood faced former Cage Warriors Featherweight Champion Morgan Charrière on 22 March 2025 at UFC Fight Night 255. He won the fight by unanimous decision.

Wood faced José Miguel Delgado on 25 October 2025, at UFC 321. At the weigh-ins, Delgado weighed in at 147 pounds, one pound over the featherweight non-title fight limit. The bout proceeded at catchweight. Wood won the fight by unanimous decision.

Wood faced Losene Keita on 21 March 2026, at UFC Fight Night 270. He won the fight by split decision.

Wood was scheduled to face Mairon Santos on 5 September 2026 at UFC Fight Night 287. However, Santos was forced to withdraw due to an unspecified health issue and was replaced by promotional newcomer Pavel Andrusca. Wood lost the fight by unanimous decision.

== Professional grappling career ==
Wood was booked to compete in a superfight against Aljamain Sterling at Polaris 25 on 30 September 2023. However, Wood withdrew from the match and was replaced by Mike Grundy instead.

Wood was scheduled to compete against Mason Jones in a superfight at Polaris 27 on 23 March 2024. However, Wood ended up facing Alex Caceres and won via decision.

Wood competed against Cameron Else at Polaris 30 on 2 November 2024. He won the match by decision.

== Championships and accomplishments ==
=== Mixed martial arts ===
- Ultimate Fighting Championship
  - Performance of the Night (One time) vs. Johnny Eduardo
  - Fight of the Night (One time) vs. Casey Kenney
- Cage Warriors
  - Cage Warriors Bantamweight Championship (One time; first)
    - Two successful title defenses
- MMA Junkie
  - 2020 October Fight of the Month vs. Casey Kenney
- Slacky Awards
  - 2022 Technical Turn-Around of the Year

== Mixed martial arts record ==
Professional record breakdown
30 matches	23 wins	7 losses
By knockout	8	2
By submission	5	2
By decision	10	3

Res.	Record	Opponent	Method	Event	Date	Round	Time	Location	Notes
Loss	23–7	Pavel Andrusca	Decision (unanimous)	UFC Fight Night: Hooker vs. Parnasse	5 September 2026	3	5:00	Paris, France	
Win	23–6	Losene Keita	Decision (split)	UFC Fight Night: Evloev vs. Murphy	21 March 2026	3	5:00	London, England	
Win	22–6	José Miguel Delgado	Decision (unanimous)	UFC 321	25 October 2025	3	5:00	Abu Dhabi, United Arab Emirates	Catchweight (147 lb) bout; Delgado missed weight.
Win	21–6	Morgan Charrière	Decision (unanimous)	UFC Fight Night: Edwards vs. Brady	22 March 2025	3	5:00	London, England	
Win	20–6	Daniel Pineda	Decision (unanimous)	UFC 304	27 July 2024	3	5:00	Manchester, England	
Loss	19–6	Muhammad Naimov	Decision (unanimous)	UFC 294	21 October 2023	3	5:00	Abu Dhabi, United Arab Emirates	
Win	19–5	Andre Fili	Decision (unanimous)	UFC Fight Night: Aspinall vs. Tybura	22 July 2023	3	5:00	London, England	
Win	18–5	Charles Jourdain	Decision (unanimous)	UFC Fight Night: Gane vs. Tuivasa	3 September 2022	3	5:00	Paris, France	
Win	17–5	Charles Rosa	Decision (unanimous)	UFC Fight Night: Blaydes vs. Aspinall	23 July 2022	3	5:00	London, England	Featherweight debut.
Loss	16–5	Casey Kenney	Decision (unanimous)	UFC 254	24 October 2020	3	5:00	Abu Dhabi, United Arab Emirates	Catchweight (140 lb) bout. Fight of the Night.
Win	16–4	John Castañeda	Decision (unanimous)	UFC on ESPN: Whittaker vs. Till	26 July 2020	3	5:00	Abu Dhabi, United Arab Emirates	
Loss	15–4	John Dodson	TKO (punches)	UFC Fight Night: Anderson vs. Błachowicz 2	15 February 2020	3	0:16	Rio Rancho, New Mexico, United States	
Win	15–3	José Alberto Quiñónez	Submission (rear-naked choke)	UFC Fight Night: Till vs. Masvidal	16 March 2019	2	2:46	London, England	
Win	14–3	Andre Ewell	Submission (rear-naked choke)	UFC 232	29 December 2018	3	4:12	Inglewood, California, United States	
Win	13–3	Johnny Eduardo	Submission (brabo choke)	UFC Fight Night: Rivera vs. Moraes	1 June 2018	2	2:18	Utica, New York, United States	Performance of the Night.
Win	12–3	Luca Iovine	KO (punch)	Cage Warriors 92	24 March 2018	1	0:50	London, England	Defended the Cage Warriors Bantamweight Championship.
Win	11–3	Josh Reed	TKO (punches)	Cage Warriors 86	17 September 2017	1	2:19	London, England	Defended the Cage Warriors Bantamweight Championship.
Win	10–3	Marko Kovacevic	KO (punches)	Cage Warriors 84	2 June 2017	1	3:41	London, England	Won the vacant Cage Warriors Bantamweight Championship.
Win	9–3	Vaughan Lee	TKO (punches)	Cage Warriors 82	1 April 2017	2	4:22	Liverpool, England	
Win	8–3	Chase Morton	Submission (rear naked choke)	Bellator 158	16 July 2016	2	0:48	London, England	
Loss	7–3	Alan Philpott	TKO (doctor stoppage)	BAMMA 24	26 February 2016	3	3:40	Dublin, Ireland	For the Lonsdale Bantamweight Championship.
Win	7–2	Bryan Creighton	Decision (unanimous)	BAMMA 23	14 November 2015	3	5:00	Birmingham, England	
Win	6–2	Thiago Aguiar	Decision (unanimous)	Phoenix Fight Night 27	12 September 2015	3	5:00	Bournemouth, England	
Loss	5–2	Mike Cutting	Submission (armbar)	BAMMA 18	21 February 2015	1	3:26	Wolverhampton, England	
Win	5–1	Steve McCombe	TKO (arm injury)	Cage Warriors 74	15 November 2014	1	2:23	London, England	
Win	4–1	Alexander Bilobrovka	TKO (punches)	Ultimate Challenge MMA 39	3 May 2014	1	0:34	London, England	
Loss	3–1	Ed Arthur	Submission (rear naked choke)	BAMMA 15	5 April 2014	3	1:48	London, England	
Win	3–0	Abdullah Saleh	TKO (punches)	Ultimate Challenge MMA 38	1 February 2014	1	0:22	London, England	
Win	2–0	Grisha Adams	Submission (triangle choke)	Ultimate Challenge MMA 35	3 August 2013	1	3:01	London, England	
Win	1–0	Damo Weeden	TKO (punches)	Fusion FC: Reality Check	9 February 2013	2	2:10	Epsom, England	Bantamweight debut.

== Personal life ==
Wood has a wife and two daughters. He has Obsessive–compulsive disorder (OCD).

== See also ==
- List of current UFC fighters
- List of male mixed martial artists
