= Muhammad Naimov =

Tajik mixed martial arts fighter

- Born: Muhammadjon Naimov; 7 August 1994 (age 32); Kulob, Tajikistan
- Native name: Муҳаммад Наимов
- Other names: Hillman
- Height: 5 ft 9 in (1.75 m)
- Weight: 146 lb (66 kg; 10.4 st)
- Division: Featherweight; Lightweight
- Style: Taekwondo
- Fighting out of: Dushanbe, Tajikistan
- Team: Elevation Fight Team
- Years active: 2018–present

Mixed martial arts record
- Total: 18
- Wins: 13
- By knockout: 6
- By submission: 2
- By decision: 5
- Losses: 5
- By knockout: 2
- By submission: 1
- By decision: 2

Other information
- Mixed martial arts record from Sherdog

Muhammadjon Naimov (Tajik: Муҳаммад Наимов; born 7 August 1994) is a Tajik mixed martial artist who competed in the featherweight division of the Ultimate Fighting Championship (UFC). A professional since 2018, Naimov has also competed in the Titan Fighting Championships.

== Background ==
Muhammad Naimov was born in Kulob on 7 August 1994. He studied at the Tajik National University. He speaks three languages.

Naimov began competing in taekwondo, where he won the Asian Junior Championships in Kazakhstan (2010), Tajikistan (2012), Bulgaria (2013) and Nepal (2014), and won a medal at the World Junior Championships in Estonia (2012) and Tajikistan (2014). He then began his amateur MMA career in 2016 before turning professional in 2018.

== Mixed martial arts career ==
=== Early career ===
Naimov made his professional MMA career in on November 1, 2018, at Jonathan Ogden Foundation's 13th Annual 'An Evening Ringside' against Jernato Harris, winning the bout via second-round TKO.

Naimov made his Titan FC debut against Harrison Melendez on January 25, 2019, at Titan FC 52. He won the bout by first-round TKO.

Naimov faced Landon Quinones at Titan FC 54 on April 26, 2019. He won the bout via split decision.

Naimov faced Shawn Brown at Titan FC 58 on December 20, 2019. He won the bout via technical submission in the first round.

Naimov faced Shawn Brown at Titan FC 62 on July 23, 2020. He won the bout via second-round TKO.

Naimov faced Collin Anglin at Dana White's Contender Series 33 on September 15, 2020. He lost the fight via unanimous decision.

Returning to Titan FC, Naimov faced Olivier Murad for the vacant Titan FC Featherweight Championship at Titan FC 67. He lost the bout by unanimous decision.

=== Ultimate Fighting Championship ===
In his UFC debut, Naimov faced Jamie Mullarkey on June 3, 2023, at UFC on ESPN 46 as a replacement for Guram Kutateladze. He won the bout via technical knockout in the second round, earning him his first Performance of the Night bonus award.

Moving down to featherweight, Naimov faced Nathaniel Wood on October 21, 2023, at UFC 294. He won the fight via unanimous decision.

Naimov faced Erik Silva on February 24, 2024, at UFC Fight Night 237. He won by first round technical knockout after Silva injured his leg.

Naimov was scheduled to face Melsik Baghdasaryan on June 22, 2024 at UFC on ABC 6. However, Baghdasaryan pulled out during fight week due to a torn labrum in his left shoulder and was replaced by promotional newcomer Felipe Lima. Naimov lost the fight by a rear-naked choke submission in the third round.

Naimov faced Kaan Ofli on February 1, 2025 at UFC Fight Night 250. He won the fight by unanimous decision.

Naimov faced Bogdan Grad on June 21, 2025 at UFC on ABC 8. He won the fight by unanimous decision.

Naimov was scheduled to face Mairon Santos on November 22, 2025 at UFC Fight Night 265. However, for undisclosed reasons, the matchup was rescheduled to take place two weeks later at UFC 323. At the weigh-ins, Santos weighed in at 147.5 pounds, 1.5 pounds over the featherweight non-title fight limit. The bout proceeded at catchweight and he was fined 20 percent of his purse, which went to Naimov. Naimov lost the fight by technical knockout in the third round.

Naimov faced Losene Keita on September 5, 2026, at UFC Fight Night 287. He lost the fight by knockout in the first round.

On October 16, 2026, it was reported that Naimov was removed from the UFC roster.

== Championships and accomplishments ==
- Ultimate Fighting Championship
  - Performance of the Night (One time) vs. Jamie Mullarkey

== Mixed martial arts record ==
Professional record breakdown
18 matches	13 wins	5 losses
By knockout	6	2
By submission	2	1
By decision	5	2

Res.	Record	Opponent	Method	Event	Date	Round	Time	Location	Notes
Loss	13–5	Losene Keita	KO (punch)	UFC Fight Night: Hooker vs. Parnasse	September 5, 2026	1	2:54	Paris, France	
Loss	13–4	Mairon Santos	TKO (punches)	UFC 323	December 6, 2025	3	0:21	Las Vegas, Nevada, United States	Catchweight (147.5 lb) bout; Santos missed weight.
Win	13–3	Bogdan Grad	Decision (unanimous)	UFC on ABC: Hill vs. Rountree Jr.	June 21, 2025	3	5:00	Baku, Azerbaijan	
Win	12–3	Kaan Ofli	Decision (unanimous)	UFC Fight Night: Adesanya vs. Imavov	February 1, 2025	3	5:00	Riyadh, Saudi Arabia	
Loss	11–3	Felipe Lima	Submission (rear-naked choke)	UFC on ABC: Whittaker vs. Aliskerov	June 22, 2024	3	1:15	Riyadh, Saudi Arabia	
Win	11–2	Erik Silva	TKO (leg injury)	UFC Fight Night: Moreno vs. Royval 2	February 24, 2024	1	0:44	Mexico City, Mexico	
Win	10–2	Nathaniel Wood	Decision (unanimous)	UFC 294	October 21, 2023	3	5:00	Abu Dhabi, United Arab Emirates	Return to Featherweight.
Win	9–2	Jamie Mullarkey	TKO (punches)	UFC on ESPN: Kara-France vs. Albazi	June 3, 2023	2	2:59	Las Vegas, Nevada, United States	Lightweight debut. Performance of the Night.
Win	8–2	Dylan Schulte	TKO (head kick and punches)	Tuff-N-Uff 131	March 3, 2023	1	0:34	Las Vegas, Nevada, United States	
Win	7–2	Sitik Muduev	Decision (split)	Tuff-N-Uff 129	August 12, 2022	3	5:00	Las Vegas, Nevada, United States	
Win	6–2	Andres Ponce	Submission (arm-triangle choke)	Titan FC 72	September 17, 2021	1	4:53	Miami, Florida, United States	
Loss	5–2	Olivier Murad	Decision (unanimous)	Titan FC 67	February 12, 2021	5	5:00	Miami, Florida, United States	For the vacant Titan FC Featherweight Championship.
Loss	5–1	Collin Anglin	Decision (unanimous)	Dana White's Contender Series 33	September 15, 2020	2	2:23	Las Vegas, Nevada, United States	
Win	5–0	Josh Augustine	TKO (submission to leg kick)	Titan FC 62	July 23, 2020	2	0:22	Miami, Florida, United States	
Win	4–0	Shawn Brown	Technical Submission (rear-naked choke)	Titan FC 58	December 20, 2019	1	4:41	Fort Lauderdale, Florida, United States	
Win	3–0	Landon Quiñones	Decision (split)	Titan FC 54	April 26, 2019	3	5:00	Fort Lauderdale, Florida, United States	
Win	2–0	Harrison Melendez	TKO (retirement)	Titan FC 52	January 25, 2019	1	5:00	Fort Lauderdale, Florida, United States	
Win	1–0	Jernato Harris	TKO (punches)	The Jonathan Ogden Foundation: 13th Annual 'An Evening Ringside'	November 1, 2018	2	1:18	Hunt Valley, Maryland, United States	Featherweight debut.

== See also ==
- List of male mixed martial artists
