= Aaron Aby =

Welsh martial artist (born 1990)

- Born: 8 February 1990 (age 36); Wrexham, Wales
- Height: 5 ft 5 in (1.65 m)
- Weight: 125 lb (57 kg; 8 st 13 lb)
- Division: Flyweight
- Fighting out of: Liverpool, England
- Team: The MMA Academy Liverpool
- Years active: 2013–present

Mixed martial arts record
- Total: 32
- Wins: 20
- By knockout: 2
- By submission: 7
- By decision: 11
- Losses: 11
- By knockout: 2
- By decision: 9
- Draws: 1

Other information
- Mixed martial arts record from Sherdog

Aaron Aby (born 8 February 1990) is a Welsh professional mixed martial artist and former footballer who represented Wales at youth level.

== Mixed martial arts career ==
Aby had numerous bouts in various MMA promotions before main eventing UK Fighting Championships 12 against Daryl Grant on 7 December 2019, which was declared a draw.

Aby faced Elias Garcia for the Oktagon MMA Flyweight Championship on 4 November 2023 at Oktagon 48: Aby vs. Garcia and lost by technical knockout as a result of a doctor stoppage.

Aby later faced Sam Creasey in a trilogy bout again for the Oktagon MMA Flyweight Championship on 20 April 2024 at Oktagon 56: Aby vs. Creasey and lost via unanimous decision.

Aby faced Zhalgas Zhumagulov on 9 November 2024 at Oktagon 63. He lost the fight by unanimous decision.

== Personal life ==
Aby runs a fitness and MMA gym in his hometown of Wrexham, with his father - former professional rugby player Jon Aby.

Aby was diagnosed with cystic fibrosis during childhood and recovered from testicular cancer following being diagnosed with it in 2017.

== Mixed martial arts record ==
Professional record breakdown
31 matches	20 wins	11 losses
By knockout	2	2
By submission	7	0
By decision	11	9

Res.	Record	Opponent	Method	Event	Date	Round	Time	Location	Notes
Win	20–11–1	David Dvořák	Decision (split)	Oktagon 95	October 17, 2026	3	5:00	Karlovy Vary, Czech Republic	
Win	19–11–1	Zoran Milić	Decision (unanimous)	Oktagon 91	July 11, 2026	3	5:00	Cologne, Germany	
Win	18–11–1	Resant Ashırov	Submission (arm-triangle choke)	Professional Muaythai League 18	January 24, 2026	1	0:56	Hlohovec, Slovakia	
Win	17–11–1	Danijel Špoljarić	TKO (retirement)	Professional Muaythai League 17	November 8, 2025	1	N/A	Prague, Czech Republic	
Loss	16–11–1	Mohammed Walid	Decision (unanimous)	Oktagon 69	April 5, 2025	3	5:00	Dortmund, Germany	
Loss	16–10–1	Zhalgas Zhumagulov	Decision (unanimous)	Oktagon 63	November 9, 2024	3	5:00	Bratislava, Slovakia	
Loss	16–9–1	Sam Creasey	Decision (unanimous)	Oktagon 56	April 20, 2024	3	5:00	Birmingham, England	For the vacant Oktagon Flyweight Championship.
Win	16–8–1	Christopher Daniel	Decision (unanimous)	Oktagon 52	January 27, 2024	3	5:00	Newcastle, England	
Loss	15–8–1	Elias Garcia	TKO (doctor stoppage)	Oktagon 48	November 4, 2023	3	5:00	Manchester, England	For the Oktagon Flyweight Championship.
Win	15–7–1	Joevincent So	Decision (unanimous)	UAE Warriors 44	August 26, 2023	3	5:00	Abu Dhabi, United Arab Emirates	
Win	14–7–1	Junior Willian da Silva Pereira	Submission (triangle choke)	Full Contact Contender 33	March 25, 2023	1	N/A	Bolton, England	
Loss	13–7–1	Victor Nunes	Decision (unanimous)	UAE Warriors 36	February 25, 2023	3	5:00	Abu Dhabi, United Arab Emirates	
Loss	13–6–1	Stipe Brcic	Decision (unanimous)	Cage Warriors 146	August 13, 2022	3	5:00	Manchester, England	
Loss	13–5–1	Michelangelo Lupoli	Decision (unanimous)	Cage Warriors 142	August 13, 2022	3	5:00	Ebbw Vale, Wales	
Win	13–4–1	Gerardo Fanny	Submission (rear-naked choke)	Cage Warriors 136	April 2, 2022	3	2:25	Manchester, England	
Win	12–4–1	Samir Faiddine	Decision (unanimous)	Cage Warriors 132	December 11, 2021	3	5:00	London, England	
Loss	11–4–1	Sam Creasey	Decision (unanimous)	Cage Warriors 123	June 24, 2021	3	5:00	London, England	
Win	11–3–1	Mohamed Gamal	Decision (unanimous)	Probellum MMA: Dubai	February 7, 2020	3	5:00	Dubai, United Arab Emirates	
Draw	10–3–1	Daryl Grant	Draw (majority)	UKFC 12	December 7, 2019	3	5:00	Preston, England	
Win	10–3	Danny Missin	Decision (majority)	ACB 70	September 23, 2017	3	5:00	Sheffield, England	Catchweight (129.2 lb) bout; Missin missed weight.
Win	9–3	Sam Halliday	Submission (arm-triangle choke)	ACB 65	July 22, 2017	3	5:00	Sheffield, England	Catchweight (130 lb) bout.
Win	8–3	Coner Hignett	Decision (split)	ACB 54	March 11, 2017	3	5:00	Manchester, England	Catchweight (130 lb) bout.
Loss	7–3	Andy Young	Decision (unanimous)	Full Contact Contender 16	June 18, 2016	3	5:00	Bolton, England	For the vacant FCC Flyweight Championship.
Win	7–2	Adrian Ponz	Decision (unanimous)	UKFC 1	March 7, 2016	3	5:00	Preston, England	
Win	6–2	Karim Miard	Decision (unanimous)	Full Contact Contender 14	October 17, 2015	3	5:00	Bolton, England	Catchweight (130 lb) bout.
Win	5–2	Sebastien Louchet	Submission (guillotine choke)	ICE FC 6	June 12, 2015	3	5:00	Manchester, England	
Win	4–2	Ben Dearden	TKO (punches)	Full Contact Contender 12	March 28, 2015	1	4:42	Bolton, England	
Loss	3–2	Danny Missin	TKO (punches)	Full Contact Contender 11	October 18, 2014	1	4:06	Bolton, England	
Win	3–1	Scott Gregory	Submission (armbar)	Full Contact Contender 10	June 21, 2014	1	3:23	Bolton, England	
Loss	2–1	Mick Gerrard	Decision (unanimous)	Full Contact Contender 9	March 22, 2014	3	5:00	Bolton, England	
Win	2–0	John Spencer	Submission (rear-naked choke)	OMMAC 18	September 8, 2013	1	3:40	Liverpool, England	
Win	1–0	Simon Osborne	Decision (unanimous)	OMMAC 17	June 1, 2013	3	5:00	Liverpool, England	Flyweight debut.
