= List of current Oktagon MMA fighters =

Oktagon MMA, is widely considered to be the premiere mixed martial arts organization in Czech Republic/Slovakia and one of the leading ones in Europe.

This list is an up-to-date roster of those fighters currently under contract with the Oktagon MMA. With fighters whose contract status cannot be determined, if will be included on this list if they have fought within the last two years for the promotion. Each fight record has four categories: wins, losses, draws, and no-contests. All fight records in this article are displayed in that order, with fights resulting in a no-contest listed in parentheses.

== Notes ==
1. The tables are sortable and the calculation for Endeavor and MMA records (win–loss–draw (no contest)) are formulated as follows: Fight records calculation: (1) Plus one point of the total wins for fighters have not loss a fight; (2) Negative points of total loses for fighters have not won a fight; (3) Add number of wins to the winning percentage; (4) A draw counts as 0.5 (5) No contest does not factor as one of the variables of the calculation.
  - Plus one point of the total wins for fighters having not lost a fight: 5–0–0 = 6
  - Negative points of total losses for fighters having not won a fight: 0–3–0 = -3
  - Add number of wins to the winning percentage: 10–1–0 = 10.90 | 10 + (10/11)
  - A draw counts as 0.5: 8–4–1 = 8.65 | 8 + (8.5/13)
  - No contest does not factor as one of the variables of the calculation: 8–2–0 (1 NC) = 8.80 | 8 + (8/10)

== Recent signings ==
The fighters in this section have either signed with the Oktagon MMA and yet to be debuted, have recently returned from an announced retirement, or have yet to make their Oktagon return.

Date	ISO	Name	Nickname	Division	Status / next fight / Info	Ref	MMA record
Dec 28, 2024	(France)	Anthony Salamone	Ours Blanc	Middleweight			8–2
Mar 3, 2025	(Sweden)	Elin Öberg	The Amazon	Women's Strawweight			5–3
Jul 20, 2025	(Poland)	Paweł Biernat	Bieszczadzki Rosomak	Heavyweight			4–2 (3 NC)
Sep 4, 2025	(Afghanistan)	Amir Shah Bayat		Featherweight			6–2–1
Oct 9, 2025	(Bosnia and Herzegovina)	Denis Stojnić	The Menace	Heavyweight			16–3
Nov 1, 2025	(Poland)	Michał Materla	Cipao	Middleweight			33–11
Nov 24, 2025	(Czech Republic)	Stanislav Mašek		Welterweight			0–1
Dec 21, 2025	(Poland)	Gracjan Miś		Featherweight			5–3
Jan 3, 2026	(Poland)	Dawid Januszewski	Dziki	Middleweight	(February 1) – Unknown reasons – Pulled out of Oktagon 84 (Ostrava) – Vašek Klimša		5–4
Jan 22, 2026	(Germany)	Maiwand Hamras		Welterweight	(March 2) – Injury – Out of Oktagon 85 (Hamburg) – Michael Obodozie		2–1
Feb 8, 2026	(Poland)	Dawid Romański		Flyweight	(March 9) – Injury – Bout cancelled – Oktagon 86 (Szczecin) – Aaron Aby		8–3
Feb 12, 2026	(Germany)	Jan Holzer		Light Heavyweight			0–0
Feb 25, 2026	(Netherlands)	Jarno Errens		Featherweight	Oktagon 88 (Hanover) – Damien Lapilus		17–6–1
Feb 28, 2026	(Germany)	Haci Akseker		Featherweight	Oktagon 88 (Hanover) – Andrei Oniscenco		2–0
Feb 28, 2026	(Moldova)	Andrei Oniscenco	Moldavinaction	Featherweight	Oktagon 88 (Hanover) – Haci Akseker		4–1
Mar 19, 2026	(Croatia)	Ivana Petrović		Women's Bantamweight	Oktagon 88 (Hanover) – Danielle Misteli		7–4
Mar 24, 2026	(Poland)	Dawid Jarowienko	The Polish Tank	Lightweight	Oktagon 88 (Hanover) – Altin Zenuni		3–0
Mar 31, 2026	(Poland)	Dawid Śmiełowski	Królik	Lightweight	Oktagon 90 (Berlin) – Attila Korkmaz		12–3
Apr 4, 2026	(United States)	Jackson Ross		Heavyweight			3–0
Apr 7, 2026	(Austria)	Christian Draxler	The Austrian Emperor	Welterweight	Oktagon 88 (Hanover) – Daniel Makin		20–9
Apr 26, 2026	(England)	Jack Grant		Welterweight	Oktagon 89 (Bratislava) – Ronald Paradeiser		20–9

== Current champions, weight classes and status ==
The Oktagon MMA currently uses nine different weight classes. This list of champions is updated as of April 25, 2026, after Oktagon 87.

WC	Min	Upper limit	G	Champion	Flag	Date won	Days held	Defenses	Next Fight / Info
SW	None	115 Ib; 52.2 kg	W	Mallory Martin	(United States)	Oct 10, 2024	661	1. def. Eva Dourthe at Oktagon 70 on Apr 26, 2025	TBD
FLW	>115 Ib >52.2 kg	125 Ib; 56.7 kg	M	Zhalgas Zhumagulov	(Kazakhstan)	Jun 28, 2025	400	1. def. David Dvořák at Oktagon 81 on Dec 28, 2025	TBD
FLW	>115 Ib >52.2 kg	125 Ib; 56.7 kg	W	Lucia Szabová	(Slovakia)	Apr 25, 2026	99		
BW	>125 Ib >56.7 kg	135 Ib; 61.2 kg	M	Igor Severino	(Brazil)	Mar 7, 2026	148		Oktagon 89 – Zhalgas Zhumagulov
BW	>125 Ib >56.7 kg	135 Ib; 61.2 kg	W	Lucia Szabová	(Slovakia)	Aug 9, 2025	358		TBD
FTW	>135 Ib >61.2 kg	145 Ib; 65.8 kg	M	Mochamed Machaev	(Austria)	Jan 31, 2026	183		Oktagon 88 – Gjoni Palokaj
LW	>145 Ib >65.8 kg	155 Ib; 70.3 kg	M	Mateusz Legierski	(Poland)	Nov 22, 2025	253		TBD
WW	>155 Ib >70.3 kg	170 Ib; 77.1 kg	M	Kaik Brito	(Brazil)	Feb 14, 2026	169		
MW	>170 Ib >77.1 kg	185 Ib; 83.9 kg	M	Kerim Engizek	(Turkey)	Oct 10, 2024	661		Oktagon 91 – Krzysztof Jotko
MW	>170 Ib >77.1 kg	185 Ib; 83.9 kg	M	Makhmud Muradov (ic)	(Uzbekistan)	Jun 14, 2025	414		TBD
LHW	>185 Ib >83.9 kg	205 Ib; 93 kg	M	Will Fleury	(Republic of Ireland)	Dec 29, 2024	581		TBD
HW	>205 Ib >93 kg	265 Ib; 120.2 kg	M	Will Fleury	(Republic of Ireland)	Mar 8, 2025	512	1. def. Martin Buday at Oktagon 81 on Dec 28, 2025	TBD

== Heavyweight (265 lb, 120 kg) ==
ISO	Name	Age	Ht.	Nickname	Result / next fight / status	Oktagon record	MMA record
(Slovakia)	Martin Buday	34	6 ft 4 in (1.93 m)	Badys	Oktagon 89 (Bratislava) – Lazar Todev	5–1	16–3
(Ukraine)	Yevhenii Orlov	37	6 ft 1 in (1.85 m)		Oktagon 88 (Hanover) – Simon Biyong	0–1	9–1
(Czech Republic)	Daniel Škvor	37	6 ft 4 in (1.93 m)	DeeDee		10–4	11–4
(Poland)	Adam Pałasz	36	6 ft 4 in (1.93 m)	Adaś z Jawora	Oktagon 89 (Bratislava) – Patrick Vespaziani	3–4	9–5
(Bulgaria)	Lazar Todev	30	6 ft 2 in (1.88 m)	The Punisher	Oktagon 89 (Bratislava) – Martin Buday	5–2	13–7
(Germany)	Ruben Wolf	40	6 ft 2 in (1.88 m)	The Viking	(March 7) – Injured during warm-up – Out of Oktagon 85 (Hamburg) – Olutobi Ayodeji Kalejaiye	0–2	12–13
(Germany)	Marc Doussis	37	6 ft 0 in (1.83 m)		Oktagon 91 (Cologne) – Olutobi Ayodeji Kalejaiye	1–3	9–5
(Germany)	Sebastian Herzberg	40	6 ft 2 in (1.88 m)			1–1	5–1
(Republic of Ireland)	Will Fleury (c)	37	6 ft 4 in (1.93 m)		Oktagon 90 (Berlin) – Kasim Aras	5–0	16–3 (1 NC)
(Germany)	Patrick Vespaziani	34	6 ft 7 in (2.01 m)	IL Gladiatore	Oktagon 89 (Bratislava) – Adam Pałasz	3–1	6–3
(Serbia)	Jovan Zeljkovic	30	6 ft 1 in (1.85 m)			0–1	5–2
(Turkey)	Kasim Aras	39	5 ft 10 in (1.78 m)		Oktagon 90 (Berlin) – Will Fleury	2–0	11–5
(Brazil)	Luis Henrique	32	6 ft 1 in (1.85 m)	Lion Heart		0–1	17–10 (1 NC)
(Italy)	Simon Biyong	35	6 ft 5 in (1.96 m)	Hemlé	Oktagon 88 (Hanover) – Yevhenii Orlov	0–1	11–6
(Netherlands)	Olutobi Ayodeji Kalejaiye	46	6 ft 3 in (1.91 m)	Mad Dog	Oktagon 91 (Cologne) – Marc Doussis	1–1	10–9
(Germany)	Nicolaj Wagner	36	6 ft 2 in (1.88 m)	Zangief	Loss – Oktagon 85 (Hamburg) – Olutobi Ayodeji Kalejaiye	0–1	4–4
(Poland)	Michał Piwowarski	37	6 ft 0 in (1.83 m)	Piwo	Win – Oktagon 86 (Szczecin) – Timo Feucht	1–0	8–4
(Germany)	Timo Feucht	30	6 ft 3 in (1.91 m)		Loss – Oktagon 86 (Szczecin) – Michał Piwowarski	0–1	8–2

== Light Heavyweight (205 lb, 93 kg) ==
ISO	Name	Age	Ht.	Nickname	Result / next fight / status	Oktagon record	MMA record
(Slovakia)	Pavol Langer	35	6 ft 5 in (1.96 m)			6–6	13–12
(Slovakia)	Attila Végh	40	6 ft 5 in (1.96 m)	Pumukli		4–3	33–11–2
(Czech Republic)	Zdeněk Polívka	28	6 ft 1 in (1.85 m)	Game Over		7–4	10–8
(Poland)	Mateusz Strzelczyk	35	6 ft 4 in (1.93 m)	Pająk	Loss – Oktagon 87 (Liberec) – Vojtech Garba	5–6 (1 NC)	16–16–1 (1 NC)
(France)	Jorick Montagnac	32	6 ft 2 in (1.88 m)	Publiuss	Loss – Oktagon 83 (Stuttgart) – Emilo Quissua	6–3	7–4
(Germany)	Alexander Poppeck	34	6 ft 3 in (1.91 m)	Ironside	Win – Oktagon 86 (Szczecin) – Tomasz Narkun	8–1 (1 NC)	21–5 (1 NC)
(Germany)	Sebastian Heil	40	6 ft 2 in (1.88 m)			0–1	7–3
(Republic of Ireland)	Will Fleury (c)	37	6 ft 4 in (1.93 m)		Oktagon 91 (Berlin) – Kasim Aras	5–0	16–3 (1 NC)
(Poland)	Mateusz Duczmal	N/A	6 ft 4 in (1.93 m)			0–2	4–3
(Germany)	Harun Uzun	34	6 ft 0 in (1.83 m)	The Turkish Airline		0–1	5–2
(Germany)	Frederic Vosgröne	30	6 ft 0 in (1.83 m)	Neandertaler	(January 26) – Shoulder injury – Out of Oktagon 83 (Stuttgart) – Jesus Samuel Chavarría	2–0	5–0
(Germany)	Emilio Quissua	35	6 ft 4 in (1.93 m)	Rixa	Win – Oktagon 83 (Stuttgart) – Jorick Montagnac	2–0	8–0
(Brazil)	Fabio Moraes	35	6 ft 0 in (1.83 m)			0–1	7–2
(Honduras)	Jesus Samuel Chavarría	25	6 ft 1 in (1.85 m)		Loss – Oktagon 83 (Stuttgart) – Alexander Poppeck	1–1	7–1
(Poland)	Tomasz Narkun	36	6 ft 3 in (1.91 m)		Loss – Oktagon 86 (Szczecin) – Alexander Poppeck	0–1	21–7
(Czech Republic)	Vojtech Garba	30	6 ft 4 in (1.93 m)	Silesian Knight	Win – Oktagon 87 (Liberec) – Mateusz Strzelczyk	1–0	9–8

== Middleweight (185 lb, 84 kg) ==
ISO	Name	Age	Ht.	Nickname	Result / next fight / status	Oktagon record	MMA record
(Slovakia)	Milan Ďatelinka	30	6 ft 2 in (1.88 m)	Mr. Comeback	(January 10) – Ligocki's pulled to face Zawada – Removed from Oktagon 84 (Ostrava) – Daniel Ligocki	8–4 (1 NC)	10–8 (1 NC)
(Slovakia)	Samuel Krištofič	36	6 ft 0 in (1.83 m)	Pirát		11–7	17–8
(Slovakia)	Ondřej Raška	35	6 ft 2 in (1.88 m)	Andrés	Oktagon 89 (Bratislava) – Radovan Úškrt	6–5	12–9
(Slovakia)	Radovan Úškrt	34	5 ft 11 in (1.80 m)		Oktagon 89 (Bratislava) – Ondřej Raška	6–5	8–6
(Czech Republic)	David Hošek	33	5 ft 11 in (1.80 m)		(April 28) – Mazúch's injury – Bout cancelled – Oktagon 89 (Bratislava) – Marek Mazúch	7–4–1	13–8–1
(Slovakia)	Robert Pukač	34	5 ft 11 in (1.80 m)		Oktagon 89 (Bratislava) – Brian Manning	7–9	20–14–1
(Uzbekistan)	Makhmud Muradov (ic)	36	6 ft 0 in (1.83 m)	Mach		5–0	29–8 (1 NC)
(Slovakia)	Marek Mazúch	30	6 ft 0 in (1.83 m)		(April 28) – Injury – Bout cancelled – Oktagon 89 (Bratislava) – David Hošek	4–4	9–4
(Serbia)	Vlasto Čepo	31	6 ft 1 in (1.85 m)	El Chapo	(April 3) – Unknown reasons – Not competing at Oktagon 89 (Bratislava) – TBA	5–3	14–3
(Czech Republic)	Matěj Peňáz	29	6 ft 4 in (1.93 m)	Money		10–0	10–1
(Czech Republic)	Patrik Kincl	37	5 ft 11 in (1.80 m)	The Inspector		5–2	29–12 (1 NC)
(Germany)	Jamie Cordero	34	5 ft 10 in (1.78 m)			9–2 (1 NC)	10–2 (1 NC)
(Germany)	David Zawada	36	6 ft 0 in (1.83 m)	Sagat	Win – Oktagon 82 (Düsseldorf) – Daniel Ligocki	3–3	20–12
(Greece)	Andreas Michailidis	38	6 ft 0 in (1.83 m)	The Spartan		3–3	16–9
(Iran)	Hojat Khajevand	N/A	6 ft 2 in (1.88 m)			5–2	10–5
(Moldova)	Ion Taburceanu	N/A	5 ft 10 in (1.78 m)			1–1 (1 NC)	6–3 (1 NC)
(Turkey)	Kerim Engizek (c)	35	6 ft 0 in (1.83 m)		Oktagon 91 (Cologne) – Krzysztof Jotko	6–1	24–5
(England)	Scott Askham	38	6 ft 3 in (1.91 m)			1–1	20–7
(Germany)	Cihad Akipa	30	6 ft 3 in (1.91 m)	Punisher		3–2	11–2
(Poland)	Piotr Wawrzyniak	35	5 ft 11 in (1.80 m)	Pitrek	(April 7) – Injury – Out of Oktagon 86 (Szczecin) – Mateusz Janur	3–2	14–7
(England)	Mick Stanton	39	5 ft 11 in (1.80 m)	The Huyton Hammer		2–1	14–9
(Germany)	Zoran Solaja	35	5 ft 9 in (1.75 m)		Loss – Oktagon 86 (Szczecin) – Kacper Frątczak	1–2	3–4
(Germany)	Daniel Schwindt	27	6 ft 2 in (1.88 m)		Loss – Oktagon 83 (Stuttgart) – Brian Manning	2–2	8–5
(Poland)	Kamil Oniszczuk	29	6 ft 3 in (1.91 m)		Win – Oktagon 82 (Düsseldorf) – Marek Bartl	2–1	12–5
(Switzerland)	Yasubey Enomoto	42	5 ft 11 in (1.80 m)	The Swiss Samurai		0–1	22–16
(Czech Republic)	Daniel Ligocki	29	6 ft 4 in (1.93 m)		Loss – Oktagon 82 (Düsseldorf) – David Zawada	3–2	5–3
(South Africa)	Mark Hulme	35	6 ft 2 in (1.88 m)			1–1	13–4
(Poland)	Krzysztof Jotko	36	6 ft 1 in (1.85 m)		Oktagon 91 (Cologne) – Kerim Engizek	4–0	29–6 (1 NC)
(Czech Republic)	Dominik Humburger	30	6 ft 1 in (1.85 m)		Win – Oktagon 87 (Liberec) – Zebaztian Kadestam	3–1	12–3
(Germany)	Andre Langen	N/A	6 ft 1 in (1.85 m)	Angry		0–1	3–3 (1 NC)
(Croatia)	Georg Bilogrevic	32	6 ft 1 in (1.85 m)			0–1	7–5
(Germany)	David Piechaczek	27	6 ft 3 in (1.91 m)			0–1	4–2
(Czech Republic)	Vašek Klimša	N/A	6 ft 1 in (1.85 m)		Loss – Oktagon 84 (Ostrava) – Brajan Przysiwek	1–1	2–1
(Republic of Ireland)	Brian Manning	31	6 ft 1 in (1.85 m)		Oktagon 89 (Bratislava) – Robert Pukač	1–0	6–0
(Poland)	Brajan Przysiwek	N/A	5 ft 7 in (1.70 m)		Win – Oktagon 84 (Ostrava) – Vašek Klimša	1–0	5–1
(Poland)	Kacper Frątczak	30	5 ft 10 in (1.78 m)	Chini / The Polish Robocop	Win – Oktagon 86 (Szczecin) – Zoran Solaja	1–0	3–0
(Poland)	Mateusz Janur	34	5 ft 11 in (1.80 m)		Win – Oktagon 86 (Szczecin) – Robin Roos	1–0	12–6
(Sweden)	Robin Roos	31	5 ft 10 in (1.78 m)	Pretty Boy	Loss – Oktagon 86 (Szczecin) – Mateusz Janur	0–1	8–7
(Sweden)	Zebaztian Kadestam	35	6 ft 0 in (1.83 m)	The Bandit	Loss – Oktagon 87 (Liberec) – Dominik Humburger	0–1	15–9

== Welterweight (170 lb, 77 kg) ==
ISO	Name	Age	Ht.	Nickname	Result / next fight / status	Oktagon record	MMA record
(Czech Republic)	Marek Bartl	32	5 ft 11 in (1.80 m)		Oktagon 89 (Bratislava) – Jozef Wittner	9–8	16–16
(Slovakia)	Ronald Paradeiser	29	6 ft 2 in (1.88 m)	Rony	Oktagon 89 (Bratislava) – Jack Grant	17–6	23–10
(Czech Republic)	David Kozma	33	6 ft 0 in (1.83 m)	Pink Panther	Win – Oktagon 84 (Ostrava) – Jozef Wittner	13–4	33–15
(Hungary)	Máté Kertész	33	6 ft 0 in (1.83 m)	The Cold Blooded		10–9	15–10 (1 NC)
(Slovakia)	Jozef Wittner	33	6 ft 0 in (1.83 m)		Oktagon 89 (Bratislava) – Marek Bartl	3–2	16–6
(Germany)	Niklas Stolze	33	6 ft 1 in (1.85 m)	Green Mask	Oktagon 90 (Berlin) – Tyrone Pfeifer	3–3	14–9
(Czech Republic)	Andrej Kalašnik	32	6 ft 2 in (1.88 m)	Vagabund	Oktagon 93 (Brno) – TBA	9–5	13–6
(Czech Republic)	Matouš Kohout	33	6 ft 0 in (1.83 m)	Mighty Rooster	Loss – Oktagon 85 (Hamburg) – Christian Eckerlin	9–7	12–10
(Brazil)	Kaik Brito (c)	29	5 ft 11 in (1.80 m)		Oktagon 93 (Brno) – Amiran Gogoladze	6–2	19–6
(Brazil)	Leandro Silva	40	5 ft 9 in (1.75 m)			6–3	30–12–1 (1 NC)
(Czech Republic)	Petr Bartoněk	N/A	6 ft 0 in (1.83 m)	Pitras	Loss – Oktagon 84 (Ostrava) – Endrit Brajshori	0–3	5–7
(Germany)	Christian Jungwirth	39	5 ft 11 in (1.80 m)	The Kelt		8–7	16–9
(Germany)	Felix Klinkhammer	30	6 ft 0 in (1.83 m)			2–0	11–0
(Germany)	Christian Eckerlin	39	5 ft 11 in (1.80 m)		Win – Oktagon 85 (Hamburg) – Matouš Kohout	5–3 (1 NC)	18–8 (1 NC)
(Bosnia and Herzegovina)	Max Handanagić	29	5 ft 11 in (1.80 m)			2–2	9–7–1
(Moldova)	Ion Surdu	31	6 ft 1 in (1.85 m)	Dracula	Loss – Oktagon 86 (Szczecin) – Amiran Gogoladze	5–4	17–8
(Georgia (country))	Amiran Gogoladze	34	6 ft 1 in (1.85 m)	The Sniper	Oktagon 93 (Brno) – Kaik Brito	4–0	18–3
(Germany)	Marcel Mohamed Grabinski	34	6 ft 0 in (1.83 m)			2–4	24–11
(Germany)	Endrit Brajshori	N/A	6 ft 0 in (1.83 m)	AK47	Win – Oktagon 84 (Ostrava) – Petr Bartoněk	4–2	6–2
(Slovakia)	Lukáš Eliáš	N/A	5 ft 11 in (1.80 m)	TongPo		2–1	5–2
(Germany)	Emir-Can Al	N/A	5 ft 10 in (1.78 m)	The Turkish Bull	Loss – Oktagon 82 (Düsseldorf) – Patrik Šebek	2–3	2–3
(Afghanistan)	Wahed Nazhand	32	5 ft 9 in (1.75 m)	The Stoneeater		3–0	10–2
(Germany)	Tamerlan Dulatov	26	6 ft 3 in (1.91 m)	Most Wanted	Oktagon 91 (Cologne) – TBA	3–0	4–0
(Slovakia)	Viktor Kováč	N/A	N/A			0–2	1–2
(Germany)	Jessin Ayari	34	6 ft 0 in (1.83 m)	Abacus		2–0	19–6
(Sweden)	Andreas Stahl	38	6 ft 0 in (1.83 m)	Real Steel		0–1	17–6
(Germany)	Daniel Makin	N/A	5 ft 10 in (1.78 m)		Oktagon 88 (Hanover) – Christian Draxler	0–1	10–16
(Brazil)	Joilton Lutterbach	33	6 ft 0 in (1.83 m)	Peregrino		0–1	42–10 (1 NC)
(Czech Republic)	Jixie Molapo	N/A	N/A		Loss – Oktagon 82 (Düsseldorf) – Arian Sadiković	1–1	1–2
(Brazil)	Geraldo Neto	35	5 ft 11 in (1.80 m)	Luan Santana		0–1	18–8
(Germany)	Arian Sadiković	31	5 ft 11 in (1.80 m)	Game Over	(March 26) – Illness – Not competing at Oktagon 88 (Hanover) – TBA	1–0	2–0
(Slovakia)	Patrik Šebek	N/A	N/A		Win – Oktagon 82 (Düsseldorf) – Emir-Can Al	1–0	3–0
(Czech Republic)	Adam Havran	30	5 ft 11 in (1.80 m)	OP	Loss – Oktagon 84 (Ostrava) – Oskar Staszczak	0–1	1–1
(Poland)	Oskar Staszczak	N/A	6 ft 1 in (1.85 m)		Win – Oktagon 84 (Ostrava) – Adam Havran	1–0	5–0
(Germany)	Michael Obodozie	N/A	N/A		Win – Oktagon 85 (Hamburg) – Sebastian Horvath	1–0	1–0
(Slovakia)	Sebastian Horvath	N/A	N/A		Loss – Oktagon 85 (Hamburg) – Michael Obodozie	0–1	0–1
(Germany)	Tyrone Pfeifer	27	5 ft 9 in (1.75 m)		Oktagon 90 (Berlin) – Niklas Stolze	1–0	7–1
(Poland)	Natan Niewiadomski	26	5 ft 11 in (1.80 m)		Win – Oktagon 86 (Szczecin) – Patrick Spirk	1–0	3–0
(Austria)	Patrick Spirk	35	5 ft 8 in (1.73 m)	Panzer	Loss – Oktagon 86 (Szczecin) – Natan Niewiadomski	0–1	5–4

== Lightweight (155 lb, 70 kg) ==
ISO	Name	Age	Ht.	Nickname	Result / next fight / status	Oktagon record	MMA record
(Slovakia)	František Fodor	36	5 ft 11 in (1.80 m)		Win – Oktagon 84 (Ostrava) – Jan Široký	7–5	11–9
(Czech Republic)	Jakub Bahník	32	6 ft 0 in (1.83 m)	Bahňas		6–3 (1 NC)	10–5 (1 NC)
(Czech Republic)	Jan Široký	38	5 ft 7 in (1.70 m)		Loss – Oktagon 84 (Ostrava) – František Fodor	4–8	13–20 (1 NC)
(Slovakia)	Matěj Kuzník	30	5 ft 10 in (1.78 m)	Spartacus	Loss – Oktagon 84 (Ostrava) – Hafeni Nafuka	5–7	19–10
(Czech Republic)	Jan Malach	34	5 ft 11 in (1.80 m)	Kral Severu	Win – Oktagon 87 (Liberec) – Stefan Končar	4–8	19–17
(Czech Republic)	Jakub Dohnal	34	5 ft 10 in (1.78 m)	Hezoun		9–6	13–7
(Poland)	Mateusz Legierski (c)	30	5 ft 10 in (1.78 m)	Dynamite	(March 3) – Broken his thumb – Bout cancelled – Oktagon 86 (Szczecin) – Gökhan Aksu	10–1	13–2
(Czech Republic)	Jakub Tichota	27	6 ft 0 in (1.83 m)	CHIMP		5–4	5–4
(Czech Republic)	Peter Gabal	27	5 ft 11 in (1.80 m)	PIMP		3–4	7–4
(Slovakia)	Ivan Buchinger	40	5 ft 9 in (1.75 m)	Buki		8–3	46–10
(Czech Republic)	Vladimír Lengál	37	5 ft 9 in (1.75 m)	Valdo	Loss – Oktagon 87 (Liberec) – Ozan Aslaner	5–6	9–6
(Germany)	Ozan Aslaner	29	5 ft 10 in (1.78 m)		Win – Oktagon 87 (Liberec) – Vladimír Lengál	3–2	11–6–1
(Germany)	Konrad Dyrschka	34	5 ft 11 in (1.80 m)			3–0	17–2 (1 NC)
(Namibia)	Hafeni Nafuka	23	5 ft 9 in (1.75 m)	The Namibian Nightmare	Win – Oktagon 84 (Ostrava) – Matěj Kuzník	5–4	12–4
(Ukraine)	Ivan Klevets	N/A	5 ft 7 in (1.70 m)			1–2	4–3
(France)	Aboubakar Tounkara	37	5 ft 11 in (1.80 m)	Yondaime		0–2	12–7
(England)	Hascen Neri Gelezi	N/A	6 ft 0 in (1.83 m)	Morning Breakfast		3–3	10–3
(Republic of Ireland)	Denis Frimpong	31	6 ft 2 in (1.88 m)	The Menace	Oktagon 90 (Berlin) – Niko Samsonidse	6–2	8–3
(Germany)	Arijan Topallaj	27	6 ft 1 in (1.85 m)	The Albanian Eagle	Oktagon 90 (Berlin) – Jan Stanovský	4–2	9–2–1
(Slovakia)	Tomáš Cigánik	27	5 ft 6 in (1.68 m)		Loss – Oktagon 85 (Hamburg) – Denis Frimpong	3–3	7–4
(Poland)	Łukasz Rajewski	37	5 ft 10 in (1.78 m)	Raju	Loss – Oktagon 86 (Szczecin) – Jan Stanovský	1–2	13–11 (1 NC)
(Serbia)	Predrag Bogdanović	N/A	6 ft 0 in (1.83 m)			2–1	17–2
(Germany)	Attila Korkmaz	34	5 ft 8 in (1.73 m)	The Fearless	Oktagon 90 (Berlin) – Dawid Śmiełowski	2–4	16–11
(Czech Republic)	Jan Stanovský	27	5 ft 11 in (1.80 m)		Oktagon 90 (Berlin) – Arijan Topallaj	3–1	8–2
(Germany)	Max Coga	37	5 ft 8 in (1.73 m)	Mad		1–0	27–8–1
(Germany)	Kevin Enz	27	5 ft 10 in (1.78 m)	Violenz		1–3	4–4
(Turkey)	Gökhan Aksu	34	5 ft 9 in (1.75 m)	Abinator	(March 3) – Legierski broken his thumb – Bout cancelled – Oktagon 86 (Szczecin) – Mateusz Legierski	3–0	14–6–1
(Germany)	Fedor Duric	21	6 ft 1 in (1.85 m)		Win – Oktagon 84 (Ostrava) – Tomáš Murdoch	3–1	9–1
(Serbia)	Ognjen Dimić	N/A	6 ft 0 in (1.83 m)			0–3	8–5–1 (1 NC)
(Germany)	Benny Bajrami	24	5 ft 9 in (1.75 m)	The Prodigy	(January 18) – Unknown reasons – Pulled out of Oktagon 84 (Ostrava) – Lukáš Závičák / Moving to Featherweight	0–2	6–4
(Czech Republic)	Tomáš Mudroch	28	5 ft 8 in (1.73 m)		Loss – Oktagon 84 (Ostrava) – Fedor Duric	3–1	8–2
(Moldova)	Petru Buzdugan	26	5 ft 8 in (1.73 m)	The Mace		0–2	6–3
(Germany)	Robin Frank	28	6 ft 0 in (1.83 m)		(January 17) – Injury – Bout cancelled – Oktagon 83 (Stuttgart) – Elias Jakobi	0–1	5–1
(Iraq)	Alan Omer	37	5 ft 9 in (1.75 m)	Mr. Erbil		1–0	25–5
(Poland)	Łukasz Kopera	37	5 ft 9 in (1.75 m)	Dajmos		0–1	11–9
(Germany)	Elias Jakobi	N/A	5 ft 11 in (1.80 m)		(February 27) – Illness – Out of Oktagon 85 (Hamburg) – Denis Frimpong	0–1	4–1
(Germany)	Ahmad Halimson	29	5 ft 11 in (1.80 m)		Oktagon 90 (Berlin) – TBA	1–1	7–4–1
(Albania)	Altin Zenuni	23	5 ft 11 in (1.80 m)		Oktagon 88 (Hanover) – Dawid Jarowienko	3–0	3–0
(Slovakia)	Tibor Balázs	N/A	N/A	Tibi		0–1	3–3–1
(Republic of Ireland)	Richie Smullen	34	5 ft 9 in (1.75 m)		Oktagon 90 (Berlin) – Zafar Mohsen / Moving to Featherweight	1–1	15–4–1
(France)	David-Tonatiuh Crol	29	5 ft 7 in (1.70 m)	The Immortal / Tona		0–1	11–11
(Germany)	Daniel Weichel	41	5 ft 10 in (1.78 m)	Drake		1–0	43–15
(Germany)	Hassan Kayani	N/A	N/A			0–1	3–1–1
(Poland)	Bartłomiej Skowyra	N/A	6 ft 1 in (1.85 m)	Bucketboy		0–1	5–4
(Czech Republic)	Alex Hutyra	22	6 ft 2 in (1.88 m)		Win – Oktagon 87 (Liberec) – Umut Birdal	2–0	4–0
(Turkey)	Murat Tüysüz	N/A	N/A		Loss – Oktagon 82 (Düsseldorf) – Altin Zenuni	0–1	4–1
(Germany)	Maurice Adorf	N/A	N/A		Loss – Oktagon 82 (Düsseldorf) – Tomáš Cigánik	0–1	6–4
(Serbia)	Stefan Končar	24	N/A	The Butcher	Loss – Oktagon 87 (Liberec) – Jan Malach	0–2	4–2
(Germany)	Umut Birdal	29	6 ft 0 in (1.83 m)	The Sniper	Loss – Oktagon 87 (Liberec) – Alex Hutyra	0–1	3–1

== Featherweight (145 lb, 66 kg) ==
ISO	Name	Age	Ht.	Nickname	Result / next fight / status	Oktagon record	MMA record
(Slovakia)	Vojto Barborík	33	6 ft 0 in (1.83 m)	NRP	(April 6) – Unknown reasons – Out of Oktagon 86 (Szczecin) – Łukasz Rajewski	3–2	16–4
(Slovakia)	Karol Ryšavý	33	5 ft 11 in (1.80 m)	Bomby	Oktagon 89 (Bratislava) – Daniel Schordje	13–8	15–10
(France)	Damien Lapilus	38	5 ft 8 in (1.73 m)	Walking Dead	Oktagon 88 (Hanover) – Jarno Errens	1–1	22–15–3 (3 NC)
(Georgia (country))	Mate Sanikidze	27	6 ft 0 in (1.83 m)	The NextGen		4–3	11–5
(Germany)	Michael Deiga-Scheck	40	5 ft 10 in (1.78 m)	Vivo		2–4	11–8
(Slovakia)	Marco Novák	36	5 ft 11 in (1.80 m)		Oktagon 89 (Bratislava) – Ayton De Paepe	4–2	7–2
(Sweden)	Samuel Bark	34	5 ft 9 in (1.75 m)	Sammon Decker	Loss – Oktagon 87 (Liberec) – Radek Roušal	2–3	13–4
(Germany)	Niko Samsonidse	31	5 ft 11 in (1.80 m)	One Love	Oktagon 90 (Berlin) – Denis Frimpong / Moving to Lightweight	4–2	12–4
(Czech Republic)	Radek Roušal	31	5 ft 10 in (1.78 m)	Ruchy	Win – Oktagon 87 (Liberec) – Samuel Bark	7–2	7–2
(Germany)	Nikolaos Serbezis	34	5 ft 9 in (1.75 m)	Niko		1–2	8–5
(Germany)	Deniz Ilbay	31	5 ft 6 in (1.68 m)	El Pistolero	Win – Oktagon 85 (Hamburg) – Adrian Hamerski	5–3	9–3
(Germany)	Daniel Solaja	N/A	5 ft 9 in (1.75 m)			1–3	3–3
(England)	Corey Fry	N/A	5 ft 6 in (1.68 m)	The Sniper		1–3	6–4
(Germany)	Max Holzer	24	5 ft 7 in (1.70 m)	Stifler	Oktagon 88 (Hanover) – Khalid Taha	5–0	11–0
(Germany)	Gjoni Palokaj	31	5 ft 8 in (1.73 m)		Oktagon 88 (Hanover) – Mochamed Machaev	6–0	13–3
(Czech Republic)	Jakub Batfalský	23	6 ft 0 in (1.83 m)	Batfal	Win – Oktagon 84 (Ostrava) – Eugen Black-Dell	4–2	9–2
(Austria)	Mochamed Machaev (c)	26	5 ft 7 in (1.70 m)	Mago	Oktagon 88 (Hanover) – Gjoni Palokaj	4–1	17–2 (1 NC)
(England)	James Hendin	28	5 ft 8 in (1.73 m)	The Honeybadger	Loss – Oktagon 82 (Düsseldorf) – Gjoni Palokaj	2–2	10–4
(Finland)	Eemil Kurhela	30	5 ft 11 in (1.80 m)	Sergeant		0–3	8–4
(Germany)	Mohammed Sadok Trabelsi	29	5 ft 11 in (1.80 m)	Momo		0–1	12–7
(Republic of Ireland)	Jack Maguire	N/A	5 ft 8 in (1.73 m)		(February 11) – Injury – Out of Oktagon 84 (Ostrava) – Lukáš Závičák	1–0	4–1
(Germany)	Eugen Black-Dell	N/A	5 ft 8 in (1.73 m)		Loss – Oktagon 84 (Ostrava) – Jakub Batfalský	1–3	11–9
(Italy)	Raphael Federico	26	5 ft 8 in (1.73 m)	Virtuoso		0–2	5–2
(Costa Rica)	Édgar Delgado Jimenez	37	5 ft 8 in (1.73 m)	Cebollero		0–2	15–8
(Germany)	Joel Batobo	N/A	N/A			0–1	4–1
(Germany)	Khalid Taha	33	5 ft 5 in (1.65 m)	The Warrior	Oktagon 88 (Hanover) – Max Holzer	2–0	16–5 (1 NC)
(Belgium)	Ayton De Paepe	31	5 ft 10 in (1.78 m)	Hitman	Oktagon 89 (Bratislava) – Marco Novák	2–1	14–6
(Poland)	Adrian Hamerski	33	6 ft 0 in (1.83 m)	Adi	Loss – Oktagon 85 (Hamburg) – Deniz Ilbay	0–2	4–3
(Czech Republic)	Vojtěch Khol	26	5 ft 7 in (1.70 m)	Vichr Z Hor		1–1	3–1
(Brazil)	Henrique Madureira	37	5 ft 9 in (1.75 m)	Mad Max	Win – Oktagon 86 (Szczecin) – Jonatan Kujawa	3–1	11–7
(Germany)	Hugo Vach	26	5 ft 9 in (1.75 m)	The German Tarzan	Oktagon 88 (Hanover) – Teo Saldaña Smith	2–0	7–1
(Germany)	Moritz Merten	25	N/A			0–1	2–2
(Czech Republic)	Marcel Máša	23	5 ft 9 in (1.75 m)			0–1	0–1
(Czech Republic)	Václav Štěpán	25	5 ft 9 in (1.75 m)		Win – Oktagon 87 (Liberec) – Firas Daud	2–0	4–0
(Albania)	Eriglent Prizreni	28	5 ft 9 in (1.75 m)	Bisha		0–1	3–1
(Switzerland)	Teo Saldaña Smith	31	5 ft 9 in (1.75 m)	Sangre	Oktagon 88 (Hanover) – Hugo Vach	1–0	4–1
(Germany)	Zafar Mohsen	31	5 ft 7 in (1.70 m)		Oktagon 90 (Berlin) – Richie Smullen	1–0	14–4 (1 NC)
(Czech Republic)	Lukáš Závičák	30	5 ft 9 in (1.75 m)		Loss – Oktagon 84 (Ostrava) – Daniel Schordje	0–1	6–7
(Austria)	Daniel Schordje	35	6 ft 1 in (1.85 m)		Oktagon 89 (Bratislava) – Karol Ryšavý	1–0	10–1
(Poland)	Jonatan Kujawa	32	5 ft 9 in (1.75 m)		Loss – Oktagon 86 (Szczecin) – Henrique Madureira	0–1	5–3
(Germany)	Firas Daud	25	5 ft 10 in (1.78 m)		Loss – Oktagon 87 (Liberec) – Václav Štěpán	0–1	5–1

== Bantamweight (135 lb, 61 kg) ==
ISO	Name	Age	Ht.	Nickname	Result / next fight / status	Oktagon record	MMA record
(Slovakia)	Roman Paulus	26	5 ft 9 in (1.75 m)			8–6	9–6
(Denmark)	Jonas Mågård	34	5 ft 8 in (1.73 m)	Shark		7–2	19–7
(Iran)	Farbod Iran Nezhad	36	5 ft 7 in (1.70 m)			1–1	12–4–1
(Brazil)	Igor Severino (c)	23	5 ft 7 in (1.70 m)	The Hannibal	Oktagon 89 (Bratislava) – Zhalgas Zhumagulov	2–0	10–1
(Brazil)	Wanderley Junior	32	5 ft 7 in (1.70 m)	Mexicano	Loss – Oktagon 83 (Stuttgart) – Dastan Amangeldy	1–3	18–12
(Brazil)	Elvis Batista da Silva	36	5 ft 6 in (1.68 m)	Karate Kid		1–1	15–9 (1 NC)
(Azerbaijan)	Raul Lemberanskij	24	5 ft 5 in (1.65 m)		Win – Oktagon 85 (Hamburg) – Ali Gündüz	2–0	9–0
(Germany)	Harun Kurt	30	5 ft 7 in (1.70 m)		Win – Oktagon 83 (Stuttgart) – Nathan Haywood	2–0	6–0
(Czech Republic)	Šimon Bruknar	26	5 ft 5 in (1.65 m)	Hobbit		0–1	5–2
(Sweden)	Liam Pitts	23	5 ft 11 in (1.80 m)		Win – Oktagon 87 (Liberec) – Kacper Matyszewski	2–0	4–0
(Germany)	Stephan Guidea	N/A	5 ft 5 in (1.65 m)			0–1	2–3
(Czech Republic)	Lukáš Chotěnovský	N/A	6 ft 0 in (1.83 m)		Win – Oktagon 86 (Szczecin) – Michał Hawro	1–1	7–2
(England)	Nathan Haywood	28	5 ft 7 in (1.70 m)	Little Red	Loss – Oktagon 83 (Stuttgart) – Harun Kurt	1–1	4–3
(Kazakhstan)	Dastan Amangeldy	N/A	5 ft 6 in (1.68 m)		Win – Oktagon 83 (Stuttgart) – Wanderley Junior	1–0	10–1
(Germany)	Ali Gündüz	22	5 ft 9 in (1.75 m)	The Gorilla	Loss – Oktagon 85 (Hamburg) – Raul Lemberanskij	0–1	6–1
(Tajikistan)	Khurshed Kakhorov	33	5 ft 8 in (1.73 m)	Killer	Loss – Oktagon 85 (Hamburg) – Igor Severino	0–1	13–2
(Poland)	Michał Hawro	25	5 ft 7 in (1.70 m)		Loss – Oktagon 86 (Szczecin) – Lukáš Chotěnovský	0–1	7–3
(Poland)	Kacper Matyszewski	25	6 ft 0 in (1.83 m)		Loss – Oktagon 87 (Liberec) – Liam Pitts	0–1	3–4

== Flyweight (125 lb, 57 kg) ==
ISO	Name	Age	Ht.	Nickname	Result / next fight / status	Oktagon record	MMA record
(Czech Republic)	David Dvořák	34	5 ft 5 in (1.65 m)	The Undertaker		2–1	22–7
(Georgia (country))	Beno Adamia	30	5 ft 8 in (1.73 m)			3–1	12–9–2
(Wales)	Aaron Aby	35	5 ft 4 in (1.63 m)		(March 9) – Romański injury – Bout cancelled – Oktagon 86 (Szczecin) – Dawid Romański	1–4	18–11–1
(England)	Sam Creasey	38	5 ft 6 in (1.68 m)	Urai		1–1	19–6
(Kazakhstan)	Zhalgas Zhumagulov (c)	37	5 ft 4 in (1.63 m)	Zhako	Oktagon 89 (Bratislava) – Igor Severino	3–0	19–9
(Iraq)	Mohammed Walid	31	5 ft 6 in (1.68 m)	No Mercy	Loss – Oktagon 85 (Hamburg) – Abdullah Sultani	1–2	8–6
(Germany)	Shawn Marcos da Silva	30	5 ft 7 in (1.70 m)	Vato Loco	Loss – Oktagon 85 (Hamburg) – Matheus Severino	0–1	7–2
(Brazil)	Matheus Severino	29	5 ft 5 in (1.65 m)		Win – Oktagon 85 (Hamburg) – Shawn Marcos da Silva	1–0	15–5
(Germany)	Abdullah Sultani	25	5 ft 7 in (1.70 m)		Win – Oktagon 85 (Hamburg) – Mohammed Walid	1–0	5–2

== Women's Bantamweight (135 lb, 61 kg) ==
ISO	Name	Age	Ht.	Nickname	Result / next fight / status	Oktagon record	MMA record
(France)	Clara Ricignuolo	28	5 ft 7 in (1.70 m)	Rici		2–2	3–4
(Slovakia)	Lucia Szabová (c)	28	5 ft 8 in (1.73 m)	Silent Killer	Win – Oktagon 87 (Liberec) – Leidiane Fernandes	9–0	9–0
(Czech Republic)	Lucie Pudilová	32	5 ft 8 in (1.73 m)		Win – Oktagon 83 (Stuttgart) – Katharina Lehner	8–2	17–11
(Poland)	Róża Gumienna	36	5 ft 9 in (1.75 m)			1–3	5–5
(Norway)	Cecilie Bolander	30	5 ft 5 in (1.65 m)			1–2	4–2
(Switzerland)	Danielle Misteli	N/A	5 ft 8 in (1.73 m)	The Housewife	Oktagon 88 (Hanover) – Ivana Petrović	1–0	5–4
(Germany)	Alina Dalaslan	25	5 ft 7 in (1.70 m)		Win – Oktagon 83 (Stuttgart) – Karolina Sobek	5–0	5–0
(United States)	Brittney Cloudy	36	5 ft 9 in (1.75 m)	The Quiet Storm		0–1	6–6
(England)	Niamh Kinehan	27	5 ft 7 in (1.70 m)		Win – Oktagon 86 (Szczecin) – Emilia Czerwińska	2–0	2–0
(Germany)	Katharina Lehner	36	5 ft 7 in (1.70 m)		Loss – Oktagon 83 (Stuttgart) – Lucie Pudilová	0–2	9–9
(Poland)	Karolina Sobek	26	5 ft 9 in (1.75 m)	The Alligator	Loss – Oktagon 83 (Stuttgart) – Alina Dalaslan	0–1	5–4
(Poland)	Emilia Czerwińska	36	5 ft 8 in (1.73 m)		Loss – Oktagon 86 (Szczecin) – Niamh Kinehan	0–1	3–2

== Women's Flyweight (125 lb, 57 kg) ==
ISO	Name	Age	Ht.	Nickname	Result / next fight / status	Oktagon record	MMA record
(Slovakia)	Lucia Szabová (c)	28	5 ft 8 in (1.73 m)	Silent Killer	Win – Oktagon 87 (Liberec) – Leidiane Fernandes	9–0	9–0
(England)	Megan Morris	28	5 ft 5 in (1.65 m)			1–1	2–3
(Slovakia)	Veronika Smolková	24	5 ft 4 in (1.63 m)	Sweetheart	Oktagon 89 (Bratislava) – TBA	6–1	9–3
(Poland)	Marta Sós	22	5 ft 5 in (1.65 m)			0–1	2–1
(Switzerland)	Stephanie Egger	37	5 ft 6 in (1.68 m)		Loss – Oktagon 85 (Hamburg) – Veronika Smolková	0–1	8–6
(Brazil)	Leidiane Fernandes	34	5 ft 4 in (1.63 m)		Loss – Oktagon 87 (Liberec) – Lucia Szabová	0–1	7–3

== Women's Strawweight (115 lb, 52.2 kg) ==
ISO	Name	Age	Ht.	Nickname	Result / next fight / status	Oktagon record	MMA record
(Slovakia)	Monika Chochlíková	30	5 ft 7 in (1.70 m)			2–1	3–1
(Germany)	Katharina Dalisda	34	5 ft 3 in (1.60 m)	Tigress		5–1	11–4
(United States)	Mallory Martin (c)	32	5 ft 4 in (1.63 m)			4–1	11–6
(Brazil)	Mileide Simplicio	25	5 ft 5 in (1.65 m)		Win – Oktagon 87 (Liberec) – Josefine Lindgren Knutsson	1–1	7–3
(Sweden)	Josefine Lindgren Knutsson	30	5 ft 3 in (1.60 m)	Thunder	Loss – Oktagon 87 (Liberec) – Mileide Simplicio	0–1	8–2

(c)	Indicates the current champion
(ic)	Indicates the current interim champion

- Unless otherwise cited, all records are retrieved from tapology.com.

== See also ==
- 2026 in Oktagon MMA
- List of Oktagon MMA champions
- List of Oktagon events
- Oktagon Rankings
- List of current UFC fighters
- List of current ACA fighters
- List of current Bellator fighters
- List of current Brave CF fighters
- List of current PFL fighters
- List of current Invicta FC fighters
- List of current KSW fighters
- List of current ONE fighters
- List of current Rizin FF fighters
- List of current Road FC fighters
