= 2027 in Oktagon MMA =

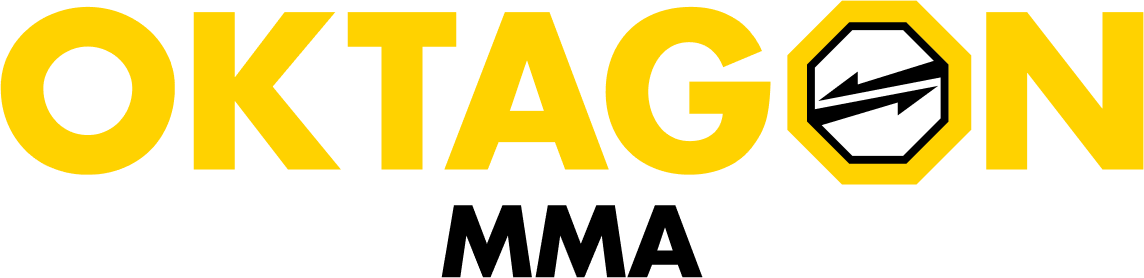

Information
- First date: January 16, 2027

Events

Fights

Chronology
2026 in Oktagon MMA	2027 in Oktagon MMA	2028 in Oktagon MMA

The year 2027 is the 11th year in the history of the Oktagon MMA, a mixed martial arts promotion based in Czech Republic and Slovakia.

== List of events ==
#	Event	Date	Venue	Location
1	Oktagon 101: Dalaslan vs. Kinehan	Jan 16, 2027	Hanns-Martin-Schleyer-Halle	Stuttgart, Germany
2	Oktagon 102: Kincl vs. Humburger	Jan 30, 2027	Home Credit Arena	Liberec, Czech Republic
3	Oktagon 103: Vienna	Feb 20, 2027	Wiener Stadthalle	Vienna, Austria
–	Oktagon: Bratislava 2027	May 1, 2027	Ondrej Nepela Arena	Bratislava, Slovakia
–	Oktagon Infinity: Düsseldorf	May 15, 2027	Merkur Spiel-Arena	Düsseldorf, Germany

== Oktagon 101: Dalaslan vs. Kinehan ==
Oktagon 101: Dalaslan vs. Kinehan
- Promotion: Oktagon MMA
- Date: January 16, 2027
- Venue: Hanns-Martin-Schleyer-Halle
- City: Stuttgart, Germany

Oktagon 101: Dalaslan vs. Kinehan is an upcoming mixed martial arts event promoted by Oktagon MMA that is scheduled to take place on January 16, 2027, in Stuttgart, Germany.

=== Background ===
A Oktagon Women's Bantamweight Championship bout for the vacant title between undefeated contenders Alina Dalaslan and Niamh Kinehan is scheduled to headline the event.

=== Fight card ===
Main card (DAZN)
Weight class				Method	Round	Time	Notes
Women's Bantamweight	Alina Dalaslan	vs.	Niamh Kinehan				(Note: For the inaugural Oktagon Women's Bantamweight Championship.)
Light Heavyweight	Emilio Quissua	vs.	Mick Stanton
Flyweight	Shawn Marcos da Silva	vs.	Fayaz Haqparast

== Oktagon 102: Kincl vs. Humburger ==
Oktagon 102: Kincl vs. Humburger
- Promotion: Oktagon MMA
- Date: January 30, 2027
- Venue: Home Credit Arena
- City: Liberec, Czech Republic

Oktagon 102: Kincl vs. Humburger is an upcoming mixed martial arts event promoted by Oktagon MMA that is scheduled to take place on January 30, 2027, in Liberec, Czech Republic.

=== Background ===
A middleweight bout between former Oktagon Middleweight Champion Patrik Kincl and Dominik Humburger is scheduled to headline the event. The pairing had been originally slated for the main event at Oktagon 95 in October 2026, but Humburger missed weight and Kincl has declined to fight at a catchweight.

=== Fight card ===
Main card (DAZN)
Weight class				Method	Round	Time	Notes
Middleweight	Patrik Kincl	vs.	Dominik Humburger

== Oktagon 103 ==
Oktagon 103
- Promotion: Oktagon MMA
- Date: February 20, 2027
- Venue: Wiener Stadthalle
- City: Vienna, Austria

Oktagon 103 is an upcoming mixed martial arts event promoted by Oktagon MMA that is scheduled to take place on February 20, 2027, in Vienna, Austria.

=== Background ===
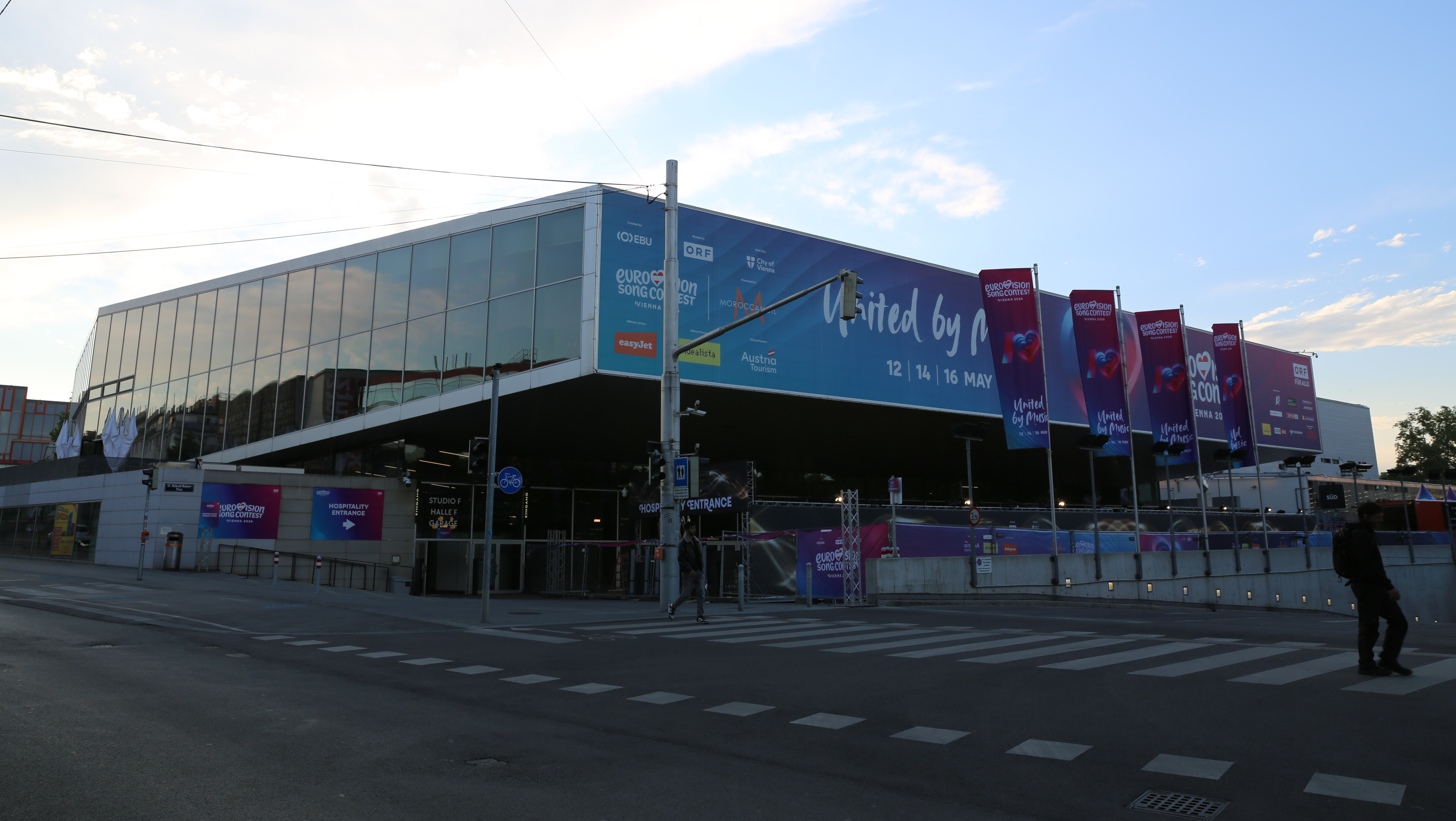
The Wiener Stadthalle will host the promotion's debut in Austria, which will become the 6th country to hold an Oktagon event.

== See also ==
- List of current Oktagon MMA fighters
- 2027 in UFC
- 2027 in Professional Fighters League
- 2027 in ONE Championship
- 2027 in Konfrontacja Sztuk Walki
- 2027 in Legacy Fighting Alliance
- 2027 in Absolute Championship Akhmat
- 2027 in Rizin Fighting Federation
- 2027 in LUX Fight League
- 2027 in Cage Warriors
