= 2026 in Oktagon MMA =

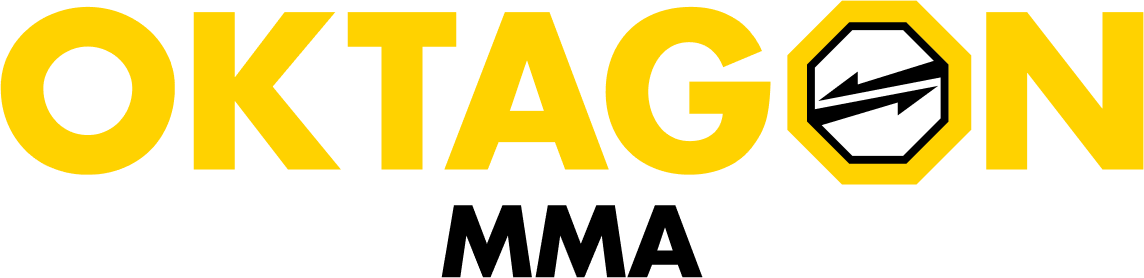

Information
- First date: January 17, 2026

Events

Fights

Chronology
2025 in Oktagon MMA	2026 in Oktagon MMA	2027 in Oktagon MMA

The year 2026 is the 10th year in the history of the Oktagon MMA, a mixed martial arts promotion based in Czech Republic and Slovakia.

== List of events ==
#	Event	Date	Venue	Location
1	Oktagon 82: Engizek vs. Jotko	Jan 17, 2026	PSD Bank Dome	Düsseldorf, Germany
2	Oktagon 83: Samsonidse vs. Machaev	Jan 31, 2026	Hanns-Martin-Schleyer-Halle	Stuttgart, Germany
3	Oktagon 84: Paradeiser vs. Brito	Feb 14, 2026	Ostravar Aréna	Ostrava, Czech Republic
4	Oktagon 85: Severino vs. Kakhorov	Mar 7, 2026	Barclays Arena	Hamburg, Germany
5	Oktagon 86: Materla vs. Jungwirth	Apr 11, 2026	Enea Arena	Szczecin, Poland
6	Oktagon 87: Szabová vs. Fernandes	Apr 25, 2026	Home Credit Arena	Liberec, Czech Republic
7	Oktagon 88: Holzer vs. Taha	May 16, 2026	ZAG-Arena	Hanover, Germany
8	Oktagon 89: Severino vs. Zhumagulov	Jun 9, 2026	Tipos Aréna	Bratislava, Slovakia
9	Oktagon 90: Fleury vs. Aras	Jun 20, 2026	Uber Arena	Berlin, Germany
10	Oktagon 91: Engizek vs. Jotko 2	Jul 11, 2026	Lanxess Arena	Cologne, Germany
11	Oktagon 92: Szabová vs. Pudilová	Aug 1, 2026	Central Tennis Court Štvanice	Prague, Czech Republic
12	Oktagon 93: Roušal vs. Mågård	Sep 12, 2026	Winning Group Arena	Brno, Czech Republic
13	Oktagon 94: Eckerlin vs. Kozma	Sep 26, 2026	Deutsche Bank Park	Frankfurt, Germany
14	Oktagon 95: Škvor vs. Narkun	Oct 17, 2026	Mattoni Arena	Karlovy Vary, Czech Republic
15	Oktagon 96: Gogoladze vs. Klinkhammer	Oct 31, 2026	SAP Arena	Munich, Germany
16	Oktagon 97: Severino vs. Holzer	Nov 7, 2026	ZAG-Arena	Hanover, Germany
17	Oktagon 98: Batfalský vs. De Paepe	Nov 21, 2026	Werk Arena	Třinec, Czech Republic
18	Oktagon 99: Aras vs. Flores	Dec 5, 2026	Westfalenhalle	Dortmund, Germany
19	Oktagon 100: Jotko vs. Muradov	Dec 29, 2026	O_{2} Arena	Prague, Czech Republic

== Oktagon 82: Engizek vs. Jotko ==
Oktagon 82: Engizek vs. Jotko
- Promotion: Oktagon MMA
- Date: January 17, 2026
- Venue: PSD Bank Dome
- City: Düsseldorf, Germany
- Attendance: 15,000

Oktagon 82: Engizek vs. Jotko was a mixed martial arts event held by Oktagon MMA on January 17, 2026, in Düsseldorf, Germany.

=== Background ===
In the final of Oktagon Middleweight Tournament bout between the current Oktagon Middleweight Champion Kerim Engizek and Krzysztof Jotko headlined the event.

A middleweight bout between Dominik Humburger and Jamie Cordero was scheduled for this event. However, Cordero withdrew from the bout due to an injury and was replaced by David Zawada. In turn, Humburger had to withdraw from the bout due to health reasons and was replaced by Daniel Ligocki. On January 11, the promotion announced that Humburger will return at Oktagon 87 on April 25.

=== Bonus awards ===
The following fighter received €5,000 bonus.

- Performance of the Night: David Zawada

=== Results ===
Main card (Oktagon.tv)
Weight class				Method	Round	Time	Notes
Middleweight	Krzysztof Jotko	def.	Kerim Engizek	Submission (rear-naked choke)	1	3:37	(Note: Oktagon Middleweight Tournament Final.)
Featherweight	Gjoni Palokaj	def.	James Hendin	Decision (unanimous) (30–27, 30–27, 30–27)	3	5:00
Featherweight	Karol Ryšavý	def.	Deniz Ilbay	Submission (guillotine choke)	1	3:49
Catchweight (180 lb)	Tamerlan Dulatov	def.	Stefan Končar	Submission (armbar)	1	4:46
Middleweight	David Zawada	def.	Daniel Ligocki	Decision (split) (29–28, 28–29, 29–28)	3	5:00	(Note: Oktagon Middleweight Tournament Reserve bout; Ligocki missed weight (187 lb).)
Preliminary card (Oktagon.tv)
Featherweight	Zafar Mohsen	def.	Samuel Bark	Decision (unanimous) (29–28, 29–28, 30–27)	3	5:00
Middleweight	Kamil Oniszczuk	def.	Marek Bartl	Technical Submission (arm-triangle choke)	2	4:32
Lightweight	Tomáš Cigánik	def.	Maurice Adorf	Submission (rear-naked choke)	1	4:11
Lightweight	Altin Zenuni	def.	Murat Tüysüz	TKO (punches)	2	2:44
Welterweight	Patrik Šebek	def.	Emir-Can Al	Decision (unanimous) (30–27, 30–27, 30–27)	3	5:00
Free Prelims (YouTube)
Catchweight (173 lb)	Arian Sadiković	def.	Jixie Molapo	TKO (punches)	2	0:38

== Oktagon 83: Samsonidse vs. Machaev ==
Oktagon 83: Samsonidse vs. Machaev
- Promotion: Oktagon MMA
- Date: January 31, 2026
- Venue: Hanns-Martin-Schleyer-Halle
- City: Stuttgart, Germany

Oktagon 83: Samsonidse vs. Machaev was a mixed martial arts event held by Oktagon MMA on January 31, 2026, in Stuttgart, Germany.

=== Background ===
A Oktagon Featherweight Championship bout for the vacant title between Niko Samsonidse and Mochamed Machaev headlined the event.

Undefeated prospects Frederic Vosgröne and Jesus Samuel Chavarría were scheduled to meet at this event. The pairing was originally scheduled to take place at Oktagon 78 in October 2025, but Vosgröne withdrew from the bout before the weigh-ins due to suffered an injury. In turn, Vosgröne withdrew from the bout due to a shoulder injury and was replaced by Alexander Poppeck.

=== Bonus awards ===
The following fighter received €5,000 bonus.

- Performance of the Night: Mochamed Machaev

=== Results ===
Main card (Oktagon.tv)
Weight class				Method	Round	Time	Notes
Featherweight	Mochamed Machaev	def.	Niko Samsonidse	KO (punches)	1	1:47	(Note: For the vacant Oktagon Featherweight Championship.)
Women's Bantamweight	Alina Dalaslan	def.	Karolina Sobek	TKO (punches)	3	3:30
Heavyweight	Lazar Todev	def.	Josh Parisian	TKO (knees to the body)	2	4:55
Light Heavyweight	Emilio Quissua	def.	Jorick Montagnac	TKO (knee injury)	1	1:43
Catchweight (203 lb)	Alexander Poppeck	def.	Jesus Samuel Chavarría	Submission (rear-naked choke)	1	3:30
Catchweight (161 lb)	Arijan Topallaj	def.	Marco Antonio Elpidio	Decision (unanimous) (29–28, 29–28, 29–28)	3	5:00
Preliminary card (Oktagon.tv)
Middleweight	Brian Manning	def.	Daniel Schwindt	KO (punches)	1	3:59
Women's Bantamweight	Lucie Pudilová	def.	Katharina Lehner	Decision (unanimous) (30–27, 30–27, 29–28)	3	5:00
Bantamweight	Dastan Amangeldy	def.	Wanderley Junior	Decision (unanimous) (30–27, 30–27, 30–27)	3	5:00
Lightweight	Ahmad Halimson	def.	Jan Malach	Decision (unanimous) (30–27, 30–27, 30–27)	3	5:00
Free Prelims (YouTube)
Bantamweight	Harun Kurt	def.	Nathan Haywood	Decision (unanimous) (29–28, 29–28, 30–27)	3	5:00

== Oktagon 84: Paradeiser vs. Brito ==
Oktagon 84: Paradeiser vs. Brito
- Promotion: Oktagon MMA
- Date: February 14, 2026
- Venue: Ostravar Aréna
- City: Ostrava, Czech Republic

Oktagon 84: Paradeiser vs. Brito was a mixed martial arts event held by Oktagon MMA on February 14, 2026, in Ostrava, Czech Republic.

=== Background ===
A Oktagon Welterweight Championship bout for the vacant title between former Oktagon Lightweight Champion Ronald Paradeiser and former champion Kaik Brito headlined the event.

A Oktagon Women's Flyweight Championship bout for the vacant title between the reigning Oktagon Women's Bantamweight Champion Lucia Szabová and Leidiane Fernandes was scheduled to co-headline the event. However, Fernandes withdrew from the bout due to an injury and the fight is expected to be rescheduled for a later date.

A Oktagon Bantamweight Championship bout for the vacant title between Igor Severino and 2023 PFL Europe Bantamweight Tournament winner Khurshed Kakhorov was scheduled to take place at the event. They were originally scheduled to compete at Oktagon 78 in October 2025, but Kakhorov has been forced to withdraw from the event due to health issues. In turn, the bout was moved to Oktagon 85 on March 7, for unknown reasons.

Konrad Dyrschka was expected to face returning veteran Matěj Kuzník in a 161 pounds bout. However, Dyrschka was forced to withdraw due to an injury and was replaced by Hafeni Nafuka.

A middleweight bout between Daniel Ligocki and Milan Ďatelinka was scheduled for this event. However, the bout was removed from the event after Ligocki pulled to face David Zawada at Oktagon 82 on January 17.

A middleweight bout between Vašek Klimša and Dawid Januszewski was originally scheduled at this event, but Januszewski pulled out due to an injury and was replaced by Brajan Przysiwek.

=== Bonus awards ===
The following fighter received €5,000 bonus.

- Performance of the Night: Kaik Brito

=== Results ===
Main card (Oktagon.tv)
Weight class				Method	Round	Time	Notes
Welterweight	Kaik Brito	def.	Ronald Paradeiser	TKO (spinning backfist)	3	1:18	(Note: For the vacant Oktagon Welterweight Championship.)
Welterweight	David Kozma	def.	Jozef Wittner	Decision (unanimous) (30–27, 30–27, 30–27)	3	5:00
Lightweight	Fedor Duric	def.	Tomáš Mudroch	TKO (punches)	2	3:15
Featherweight	Jakub Batfalský	def.	Eugen Black-Dell	Decision (unanimous) (29–28, 29–28, 29–28)	3	5:00
Catchweight (161 lb)	Hafeni Nafuka	def.	Matěj Kuzník	Submission (rear-naked choke)	2	4:54
Preliminary card (Oktagon.tv)
Lightweight	František Fodor	def.	Jan Široký	Decision (unanimous) (29–28, 29–28, 29–28)	3	5:00
Middleweight	Brajan Przysiwek	def.	Vašek Klimša	Decision (unanimous) (30–27, 30–27, 30–27)	3	5:00
Welterweight	Endrit Brajshori	def.	Petr Bartoněk	Submission (rear-naked choke)	1	0:55
Catchweight (152 lb)	Daniel Schordje	def.	Lukáš Závičák	Decision (split) (29–28, 28–29, 29–28)	3	5:00
Free Prelims (YouTube)
Welterweight	Oskar Staszczak	def.	Adam Havran	Decision (unanimous) (30–27, 30–27, 30–27)	3	5:00

== Oktagon 85: Severino vs. Kakhorov ==
Oktagon 85: Severino vs. Kakhorov
- Promotion: Oktagon MMA
- Date: March 7, 2026
- Venue: Barclays Arena
- City: Hamburg, Germany

Oktagon 85: Severino vs. Kakhorov was a mixed martial arts event held by Oktagon MMA on March 7, 2026, in Hamburg, Germany.

=== Background ===
A Oktagon Bantamweight Championship bout for the vacant title between Igor Severino and 2023 PFL Europe Bantamweight Tournament winner Khurshed Kakhorov headlined the event. The bout was originally scheduled at Oktagon 84, but the bout was moved to this event for unknown reasons. They were originally scheduled to compete at Oktagon 78 in October 2025, but Kakhorov has been forced to withdraw from the event due to health issues.

Elias Jakobi was scheduled to face Denis Frimpong at this event, but he withdrew due to illness and was replaced by Tomáš Cigánik.

=== Bonus awards ===
The following fighter received €5,000 bonus.

- Performance of the Night: Igor Severino

=== Results ===
Main card (Oktagon.tv)
Weight class				Method	Round	Time	Notes
Bantamweight	Igor Severino	def.	Khurshed Kakhorov	TKO (punches)	2	1:38	(Note: For the vacant Oktagon Bantamweight Championship.)
Catchweight (176 lb)	Christian Eckerlin	def.	Matouš Kohout	Decision (unanimous) (29–28, 29–28, 30–27)	3	5:00
Bantamweight	Raul Lemberanskij	def.	Ali Gündüz	Decision (split) (28–29, 29–28, 29–28)	2	5:00
Catchweight (152 lb)	Deniz Ilbay	def.	Adrian Hamerski	Decision (unanimous) (29–28, 29–28, 29–28)	3	5:00
Heavyweight	Olutobi Ayodeji Kalejaiye	def.	Nicolaj Wagner	TKO (punch to the body)	2	3:20
Welterweight	Tyrone Pfeifer	def.	Marek Bartl	TKO (punches and elbows)	3	3:12
Preliminary card (Oktagon.tv)
Catchweight (130 lb)	Abdullah Sultani	def.	Mohammed Walid	Decision (unanimous) (30–27, 30–27, 30–27)	3	5:00
Catchweight (161 lb)	Denis Frimpong	def.	Tomáš Cigánik	Decision (unanimous) (29–28, 29–28, 30–27)	3	5:00
Catchweight (130 lb)	Veronika Smolková	def.	Stephanie Egger	TKO (punches)	1	2:34	(Note: Egger missed weight (131.6 lb).)
Flyweight	Matheus Severino	def.	Shawn Marcos da Silva	Decision (unanimous) (30–27, 29–28, 29–28)	3	5:00
Free Prelims (YouTube)
Welterweight	Michael Obodozie	def.	Sebastian Horvath	KO (punch)	1	1:53

== Oktagon 86: Materla vs. Jungwirth ==
Oktagon 86: Materla vs. Jungwirth
- Promotion: Oktagon MMA
- Date: April 11, 2026
- Venue: Enea Arena
- City: Szczecin, Poland

Oktagon 86: Materla vs. Jungwirth was a mixed martial arts event held by Oktagon MMA on April 11, 2026, in Szczecin, Poland.

=== Background ===
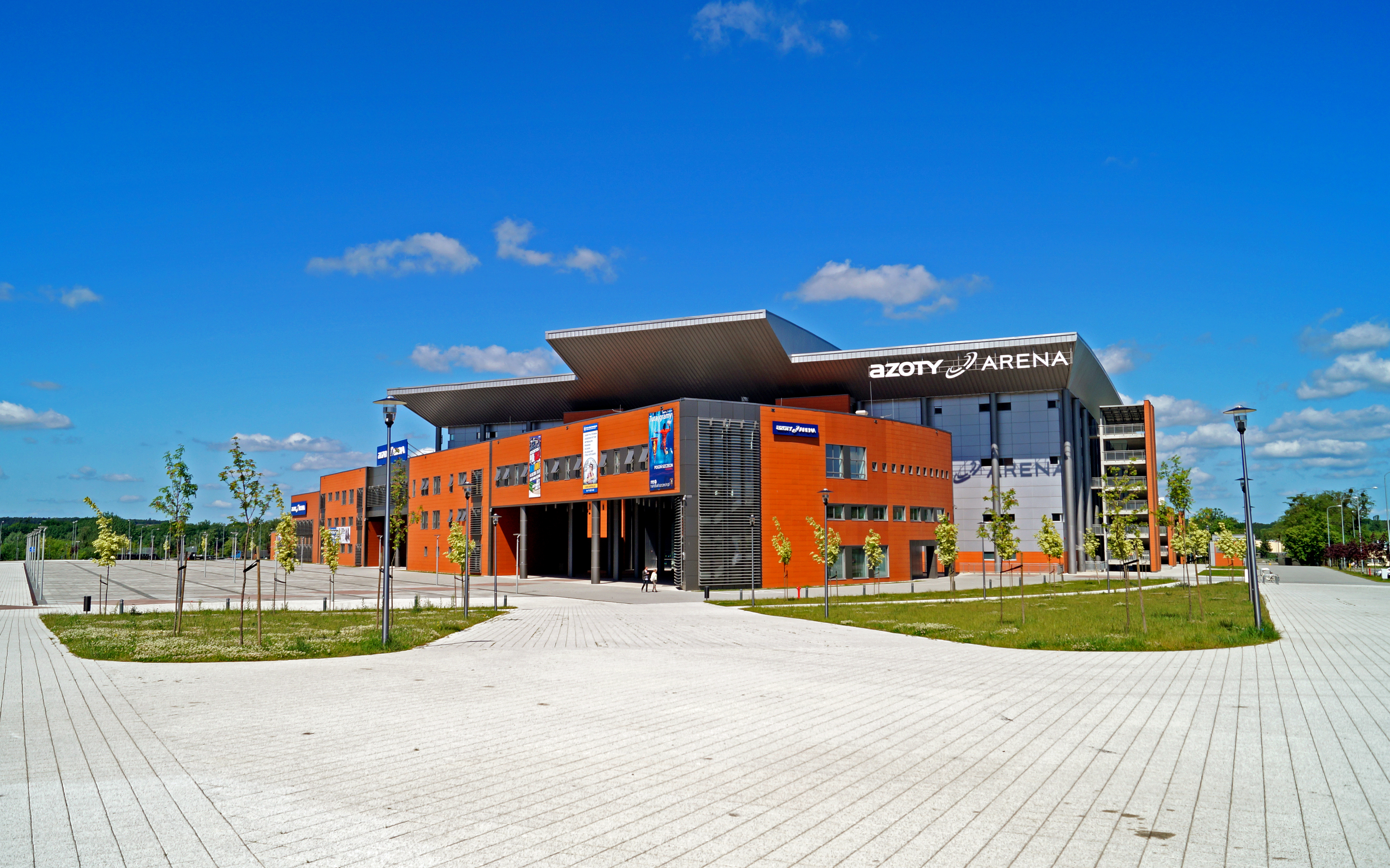
The Enea Arena hosted the promotion's debut in Poland, which became the 5th country to hold a Oktagon event.

A Oktagon Lightweight Championship bout between current two-time champion Mateusz Legierski and Gökhan Aksu was scheduled to headline this event. However, Legierski announced that he has broken his thumb and not competing at this event.

As a results, a catchweight bout of 196 pounds between former KSW Middleweight Champion Michał Materla and Christian Jungwirth served as the new main event, which the bout contested under "Stand and Bang" rules with five three-minute rounds.

A lightweight bout between Łukasz Rajewski and Vojto Barborík was scheduled at this event. However, Barborík withdrew for unknown reasons and was replaced by Jan Stanovský.

Former interim Oktagon Middleweight Champion Piotr Wawrzyniak and promotional newcomer Mateusz Janur were scheduled to meet in a middleweight bout at this event. However, Wawrzyniak withdrew from the bout due to an injury and was replaced by fellow newcomer Robin Roos.

=== Bonus awards ===
The following fighter received €5,000 bonus.

- Performance of the Night: Amiran Gogoladze

=== Results ===
Main card (Oktagon.tv)
Weight class				Method	Round	Time	Notes
Catchweight (196 lb)	Michał Materla	def.	Christian Jungwirth	Decision (unanimous) (48–46, 49–45, 48–46)	5	3:00	(Note: Oktagon "Stand and Bang" Rules (5R / 3min).)
Light Heavyweight	Alexander Poppeck	def.	Tomasz Narkun	Decision (unanimous) (29–28, 29–28, 29–28)	3	5:00
Welterweight	Amiran Gogoladze	def.	Ion Surdu	KO (punch)	1	2:34
Catchweight (194 lb)	Mateusz Janur	def.	Robin Roos	Decision (unanimous) (30–27, 30–27, 30–27)	3	5:00
Heavyweight	Michał Piwowarski	def.	Timo Feucht	TKO (punches and elbows)	2	3:57
Featherweight	Henrique Madureira	def.	Jonatan Kujawa	Decision (unanimous) (29–28, 30–26, 30–26)	3	5:00
Preliminary card (Oktagon.tv)
Lightweight	Jan Stanovský	def.	Łukasz Rajewski	TKO (elbows)	2	4:16
Middleweight	Kacper Frątczak	def.	Zoran Solaja	TKO (punches)	3	2:39
Welterweight	Natan Niewiadomski	def.	Patrick Spirk	Submission (rear-naked choke)	1	3:08
Bantamweight	Lukáš Chotěnovský	def.	Michał Hawro	Submission (rear-naked choke)	3	4:14
Free Prelims (YouTube)
Catchweight (130 lb)	Niamh Kinehan	def.	Emilia Czerwińska	TKO (punches)	3	4:48

== Oktagon 87: Szabová vs. Fernandes ==
Oktagon 87: Szabová vs. Fernandes
- Promotion: Oktagon MMA
- Date: April 25, 2026
- Venue: Home Credit Arena
- City: Liberec, Czech Republic

Oktagon 87: Szabová vs. Fernandes was a mixed martial arts event held by Oktagon MMA on April 26, 2026, in Liberec, Czech Republic.

=== Background ===
A Oktagon Women's Flyweight Championship bout for the vacant title between the reigning Oktagon Women's Bantamweight Champion Lucia Szabová and Leidiane Fernandes headlined the event. The pairing was originally expected to take place at Oktagon 84 in February, but Fernandes withdrew from the bout due to an injury.

=== Bonus awards ===
The following fighter received €5,000 bonus.

- Performance of the Night: Lucia Szabová

=== Results ===
Main card (Oktagon.tv)
Weight class				Method	Round	Time	Notes
Women's Flyweight	Lucia Szabová	def.	Leidiane Fernandes	TKO (elbows and punches)	3	2:12	(Note: For the vacant Oktagon Women's Flyweight Championship.)
Middleweight	Dominik Humburger	def.	Zebaztian Kadestam	Decision (unanimous) (30–27, 30–26, 30–26)	3	5:00
Featherweight	Radek Roušal	def.	Samuel Bark	KO (punches)	1	1:15
Welterweight	Josef Hála	def.	Tomáš Mudroch	KO (punches)	2	4:48	(Note: Oktagon "Stand and Bang" rules (3R / 3min).)
Lightweight	Ozan Aslaner	def.	Vladimír Lengál	Decision (unanimous) (29–28, 29–28, 29–28)	3	5:00
Catchweight (165 lb)	Jan Malach	def.	Stefan Končar	TKO (knee to the body and punches)	3	1:58	(Note: Končar missed weight (166 lb).)
Preliminary card (Oktagon.tv)
Light Heavyweight	Vojtech Garba	def.	Mateusz Strzelczyk	TKO (punches)	1	3:48
Featherweight	Václav Štěpán	def.	Firas Daud	Decision (split) (28–29, 29–28, 29–28)	3	5:00
Women's Strawweight	Mileide Simplicio	def.	Josefine Lindgren Knutsson	Submission (rear-naked choke)	1	4:55
Catchweight (140 lb)	Liam Pitts	def.	Kacper Matyszewski	Submission (rear-naked choke)	1	3:52
Free Prelims (YouTube)
Lightweight	Alex Hutyra	def.	Umut Birdal	Submission (rear-naked choke)	2	3:44

== Oktagon 88: Holzer vs. Taha ==
Oktagon 88: Holzer vs. Taha
- Promotion: Oktagon MMA
- Date: May 16, 2026
- Venue: ZAG-Arena
- City: Hanover, Germany

Oktagon 88: Holzer vs. Taha was a mixed martial arts event held by Oktagon MMA on May 16, 2026, in Hanover, Germany.

=== Background ===
The event marked the promotion's second visit to Hanover and first since Oktagon 75 in September 2025.

A Oktagon Featherweight Championship bout between current champion Mochamed Machaev and Gjoni Palokaj was scheduled to headline the event. However, Palokaj withdrew from the event due to an injury, so the bout was scrapped.

As a results, a featherweight bout between undefeated prospect Max Holzer and Khalid Taha served as the new headliner. The pairing was originally scheduled to headline at Oktagon 75 in September 2025, but Holzer withdrew from the event due to health issues.

A featherweight bout between UFC veteran Jarno Errens and Damien Lapilus was removed from the event due to an undisclosed reasons.

=== Bonus awards ===
The following fighter received €5,000 bonus.

- Performance of the Night: Max Holzer

=== Results ===
Main card (Oktagon.tv)
Weight class				Method	Round	Time	Notes
Featherweight	Max Holzer	def.	Khalid Taha	TKO (knee to the body and punches)	1	3:14
Featherweight	Hugo Vach	def.	Teo Saldaña Smith	KO (punch)	1	2:50
Heavyweight	Simon Biyong	def.	Yevhenii Orlov	TKO (punches)	1	3:45
Lightweight	Altin Zenuni	def.	Dawid Jarowienko	KO (punches)	1	0:52
Featherweight	Raphael Federico	def.	Haci Akseker	Decision (split) (29–28, 28–29, 29–28)	3	5:00
Preliminary card (Oktagon.tv)
Welterweight	Christian Draxler	def.	Daniel Makin	Decision (unanimous) (30–27, 30–27, 30–27)	3	5:00
Women's Bantamweight	Ivana Petrović	def.	Danielle Misteli	TKO (punches)	1	3:42
Middleweight	Justin Detzel	def.	Mate Kola	Submission (kneebar)	3	2:03
Welterweight	Bedirhan Kabak	def.	Imran Daurbekov	TKO (punches)	3	1:11
Free Prelims: Amateur bout (YouTube)
Middleweight	Jan Holzer	def.	Paul Kulze	TKO (punches)	1	1:54

== Oktagon 89: Severino vs. Zhumagulov ==
Oktagon 89: Severino vs. Zhumagulov
- Promotion: Oktagon MMA
- Date: June 6, 2026
- Venue: Tipos Aréna
- City: Bratislava, Slovakia

Oktagon 89: Severino vs. Zhumagulov was a mixed martial arts event held by Oktagon MMA on June 6, 2026, in Bratislava, Slovakia.

=== Background ===
The reigning Oktagon Bantamweight Champion Igor Severino put his bantamweight title on the line against the reigning Oktagon Flyweight Champion Zhalgas Zhumagulov at the main event. Severino and Zhumagulov has been a record unbeaten since his UFC release.

A 194-pounds catchweight bout between Marek Mazúch and David Hošek was scheduled at this event. However, Mazúch withdrew from the event due to an injury, so the bout was cancelled.

=== Bonus awards ===
The following fighter received €5,000 bonus.

- Performance of the Night: Jack Grant

=== Results ===
Main card (Oktagon.tv)
Weight class				Method	Round	Time	Notes
Bantamweight	Igor Severino (c)	vs.	Zhalgas Zhumagulov	No Contest (accidental punch to the groin)	2	2:26	(Note: For the Oktagon Bantamweight Championship. Accidental punch to the groin rendered Zhumagulov unable to continue.)
Welterweight	Jack Grant	def.	Ronald Paradeiser	Submission (twister)	1	1:14
Heavyweight	Lazar Todev	def.	Martin Buday	Decision (unanimous) (30–27, 30–27, 30–27)	3	5:00
Middleweight	Robert Pukač	def.	Brian Manning	Decision (unanimous) (30–27, 30–27, 30–27)	3	5:00
Women's Flyweight	Veronika Smolková	def.	Lisa Kyriacou	Submission (armbar)	2	3:04
Welterweight	Marek Bartl	def.	Jozef Wittner	TKO (knee to the body and punches)	2	3:46	(Note: Bartl missed weight (178.8 lb).)
Preliminary card (Oktagon.tv)
Middleweight	Radovan Úškrt	def.	Ondřej Raška	KO (punch)	1	1:49
Middleweight	Rastislav Zvara	def.	Michal Novotný	TKO (punches)	1	2:15	(Note: Oktagon Celebrity Series 2.)
Heavyweight	Adam Pałasz	def.	Patrick Vespaziani	TKO (punches)	1	1:37
Featherweight	Karol Ryšavý	vs.	Daniel Schordje	Draw (unanimous) (28–28, 28–28, 28–28)	3	5:00
Featherweight	Ayton De Paepe	def.	Marco Novák	Decision (unanimous) (29–28, 30–27, 30–27)	2	5:00
Free Prelims (YouTube)
Bantamweight	Dastan Amangeldy	def.	Moktar Benkaci	Decision (unanimous) (30–27, 30–27, 30–27)	3	5:00

== Oktagon 90: Fleury vs. Aras ==
Oktagon 90: Fleury vs. Aras
- Promotion: Oktagon MMA
- Date: June 20, 2026
- Venue: Uber Arena
- City: Berlin, Germany

Oktagon 90: Fleury vs. Aras was a mixed martial arts event held by Oktagon MMA on June 20, 2026, in Berlin, Germany.

=== Background ===
The event marked the promotion's first visit to Berlin, which will be the 8th city to hold in Germany.

A Oktagon Heavyweight Championship bout between current champion (also a current Oktagon Light Heavyweight Champion) Will Fleury and Kasim Aras headlined this event.

A Oktagon Lightweight Championship bout between current two-time champion Mateusz Legierski and Gökhan Aksu served as the co-main event.

=== Bonus awards ===
The following fighter received €5,000 bonus.

- Performance of the Night: Niko Samsonidse

=== Results ===
Main card (Oktagon.tv)
Weight class				Method	Round	Time	Notes
Heavyweight	Will Fleury (c)	def.	Kasim Aras	KO (punch)	2	1:29	(Note: For the Oktagon Heavyweight Championship.)
Lightweight	Mateusz Legierski (c)	def.	Gökhan Aksu	TKO (punches)	1	3:23	(Note: For the Oktagon Lightweight Championship)
Women's Bantamweight	Alina Dalaslan	def.	Djulia Ariana	TKO (doctor stoppage)	2	2:39
Lightweight	Niko Samsonidse	def.	Denis Frimpong	KO (punch)	1	0:53
Welterweight	Tyrone Pfeifer	def.	Niklas Stolze	TKO (punches)	1	0:22
Catchweight (165 lb)	Said-Khusein Akhyadov	def.	Attila Korkmaz	Decision (split) (29–28, 28–29, 29–28)	3	5:00
Preliminary card (Oktagon.tv)
Lightweight	Arijan Topallaj	def.	Jan Stanovský	Submission (ninja choke)	2	1:22
Middleweight	Matěj Peňáz	def.	Alan Silva	TKO (punches)	1	2:30
Lightweight	Ahmad Halimson	def.	Joseph Donkor	Decision (unanimous) (30–27, 30–27, 30–27)	3	5:00
Featherweight	Zafar Mohsen	def.	Richie Smullen	KO (punch to the body)	1	2:18
Free Prelims (YouTube)
Lightweight	Davlet Karataev	def.	Daniel Salas	Decision (unanimous) (30–27, 30–26, 30–24)	3	5:00

== Oktagon 91: Engizek vs. Jotko 2 ==
Oktagon 91: Engizek vs. Jotko 2
- Promotion: Oktagon MMA
- Date: July 11, 2026
- Venue: Lanxess Arena
- City: Cologne, Germany

Oktagon 91: Engizek vs. Jotko 2 was a mixed martial arts event held by Oktagon MMA on July 11, 2026, in Cologne, Germany.

=== Background ===
A Oktagon Middleweight Championship bout between current champion Kerim Engizek and Oktagon Middleweight Tournament winner Krzysztof Jotko headlined the event. The pairing previously fought at Oktagon 82 in January, which Jotko won the tournament by first round submission.

A Oktagon Featherweight Championship bout between current champion Mochamed Machaev and Gjoni Palokaj co-headlined the event. Machaev and Palokaj were originally scheduled to meet at Oktagon 88 in May, but Palokaj withdrew from the event due to an injury. At the weigh-ins, Machaev weighed in at 147.4 pounds, 2.4 pounds over the featherweight title fight limit. As a results, Machaev was stripped of the title and the bout proceeded with the title available only Palokaj was eligible to win it.

A heavyweight bout between Olutobi Ayodeji Kalejaiye and Marc Doussis was scheduled as the main card, but Kalejaiye was forced to withdraw before the weigh-ins due to health problems and was replaced by Sascha Weinpolter.

Before the event, the welterweight bout between Tamerlan Dulatov and Nikola Janković was pulled from the card at the last minute due to Dulatov's health problems.

=== Bonus awards ===
The following fighter received €5,000 bonus.

- Performance of the Night: Patrik Kincl

=== Results ===
Main card (Oktagon.tv)
Weight class				Method	Round	Time	Notes
Middleweight	Krzysztof Jotko	def.	Kerim Engizek (c)	Decision (unanimous) (48–46, 48–46, 48–46)	5	5:00	(Note: For the Oktagon Middleweight Championship. Engizek was deducted one point in round 3 due to grabbing the fence.)
Featherweight	Mochamed Machaev	def.	Gjoni Palokaj	KO (punches)	1	2:34	(Note: For the vacant Oktagon Featherweight Championship. Machaev missed weight (147.4 lb) and was stripped of the title, only Palokaj was eligible to win the title.)
Middleweight	Patrik Kincl	def.	Hojat Khajevand	Submission (arm-triangle choke)	2	2:08
Welterweight	Cihad Akipa	def.	Máté Kertész	TKO (knee and punches)	3	2:06	(Note: Akipa was deducted one point in round 2 due to an eye poke.)
Heavyweight	Marc Doussis	def.	Sascha Weinpolter	Submission (arm-triangle choke)	1	3:22
Preliminary card (Oktagon.tv)
Catchweight (194 lb)	Kamil Oniszczuk	def.	Mick Stanton	Decision (unanimous) (29–28, 29–28, 29–28)	3	5:00
Lightweight	Altin Zenuni	def.	Patrik Šebek	Decision (unanimous) (29–28, 29–28, 29–28)	3	5:00
Welterweight	Iwan Tagner	def.	Maiwand Hamras	Submission (rear-naked choke)	1	4:06
Heavyweight	Nicolaj Wagner	def.	Jackson Ross	TKO (punches)	1	4:13
Free Prelims (YouTube)
Flyweight	Aaron Aby	def.	Zoran Milić	Decision (unanimous) (30–27, 30–27, 30–27)	3	5:00
Amateur bout
Lightweight	Furkan Ugur	def.	Jakub Zacpal	Submission (brabo choke)	3	1:25

== Oktagon 92: Szabová vs. Pudilová ==
Oktagon 92: Szabová vs. Pudilová
- Promotion: Oktagon MMA
- Date: August 1, 2026
- Venue: Central Tennis Court Štvanice
- City: Prague, Czech Republic

Oktagon 92: Szabová vs. Pudilová was a mixed martial arts event held by Oktagon MMA on August 1, 2026, in Prague, Czech Republic.

=== Background ===
A Oktagon Women's Bantamweight Championship bout between current champion (also the reigning Oktagon Women's Flyweight Champion) Lucia Szabová and Lucie Pudilová headlined the event.

A Oktagon Light Heavyweight Championship bout between current champion (also a current Oktagon Heavyweight Champion) Will Fleury and Daniel Škvor was scheduled to serve as the co-main event. The pairing previously fought at Oktagon 56 in April 2024, which Fleury won by arm-triangle choke in round two. However, Škvor withdrew from the bout due to injury his pectoral muscle and was replaced by the interim Oktagon Middleweight Champion Makhmud Muradov (who's moving up a weight class debut).

=== Bonus awards ===
The following fighter received €5,000 bonus.

- Performance of the Night: Makhmud Muradov

=== Results ===
Main card (Oktagon.tv)
Weight class				Method	Round	Time	Notes
Women's Bantamweight	Lucia Szabová (c)	def.	Lucie Pudilová	Decision (unanimous) (49–46, 49–46, 50–45)	5	5:00	(Note: For the Oktagon Women's Bantamweight Championship.)
Light Heavyweight	Makhmud Muradov	def.	Will Fleury (c)	TKO (punches)	2	0:19	(Note: For the Oktagon Light Heavyweight Championship.)
Welterweight	David Kozma	def.	David Zawada	Decision (unanimous) (30–27, 30–27, 30–27)	3	5:00
Lightweight	Tomáš Mudroch	def.	Hafeni Nafuka	Decision (unanimous) (29–28, 29–28, 29–28)	3	5:00
Featherweight	Jakub Batfalský	def.	Vojtěch Khol	Decision (unanimous) (29–28, 29–28, 29–28)	3	5:00
Preliminary card (Oktagon.tv)
Middleweight	Daniel Schwindt	def.	David Hošek	Decision (split) (29–28, 27–30, 29–28)	3	5:00
Catchweight (176 lb)	Rafael Aronov	def.	Miroslav Brož	TKO (punches)	1	1:56
Featherweight	Firas Daud	def.	Jakub Tichota	Decision (unanimous) (30–26, 30–27, 30–27)	3	5:00
Bantamweight	Roman Paulus	def.	Harun Kurt	Decision (split) (29–28, 28–29, 29–28)	3	5:00
Free Prelims (YouTube)
Lightweight	Ivan Klevets	def.	Kevin Enz	KO (spinning back kick)	1	2:41

== Oktagon 93: Roušal vs. Mågård ==
Oktagon 93: Roušal vs. Mågård
- Promotion: Oktagon MMA
- Date: September 12, 2026
- Venue: Winning Group Arena
- City: Brno, Czech Republic

Oktagon 93: Roušal vs. Mågård was a mixed martial arts event held by Oktagon MMA on September 12, 2026, in Brno, Czech Republic.

=== Background ===
A Oktagon Welterweight Championship bout between current two-time champion Kaik Brito and Amiran Gogoladze was scheduled to headline this event. However on July 3, Brito vacated his title and he will compete at Dana White's Contender Series for the second time in his career instead. Therefore, the bout was cancelled.

A featherweight bout between Radek Roušal and former Oktagon Bantamweight Champion Jonas Mågård headlined the event.

Tomáš Cigánik was originally scheduled to face Murat Tüysüz in a lightweight bout, but Tüysüz pulled out for unknown reasons and was replaced by Berkan Badur.

=== Bonus awards ===
The following fighter received €5,000 bonus.

- Performance of the Night: Jakub Dohnal

=== Results ===
Main card (DAZN)
Weight class				Method	Round	Time	Notes
Featherweight	Jonas Mågård	def.	Radek Roušal	Submission (guillotine choke)	3	0:35
Welterweight	Kennedy Rayomba	def.	Andrej Kalašnik	Decision (unanimous) (29–28, 29–28, 29–27)	3	5:00
Lightweight	Vladimír Lengál	def.	Maurice Adorf	KO (punches)	1	3:02
Catchweight (176 lb)	Josef Hála	def.	Radovan Úškrt	TKO (punches to the body)	2	3:00	(Note: Oktagon "Stand and Bang" rules (3R / 3min).)
Middleweight	Daniel Ligocki	def.	Brajan Przysiwek	KO (knee)	2	3:06
Light Heavyweight	Robert Lau	def.	Vojtech Garba	KO (punches)	2	0:51
Preliminary card (DAZN)
Lightweight	Jakub Dohnal	def.	Vojto Barborík	KO (spinning wheel kick and punches)	2	0:11
Catchweight (163 lb)	Tomáš Cigánik	def.	Berkan Badur	Decision (split) (27–29, 28–27, 29–26)	3	5:00
Light Heavyweight	Robin Fošum	def.	Dustin Rabiega	KO (punches)	2	1:56	(Note: Oktagon "Stand and Bang" rules (3R / 3min).)
Bantamweight	Šimon Bruknar	def.	Nathan Haywood	Decision (unanimous) (30–27, 30–26, 30–27)	3	5:00
Women's Bantamweight	Niamh Kinehan	def.	Alana Cook	KO (punches)	2	0:48
Free Prelims (YouTube)
Bantamweight	Ali Gündüz	def.	Dávid Dániel Komár	Decision (split) (28–29, 29–28, 29–28)	3	5:00

== Oktagon 94: Eckerlin vs. Kozma ==
Oktagon 94: Eckerlin vs. Kozma
- Promotion: Oktagon MMA
- Date: September 26, 2026
- Venue: Deutsche Bank Park
- City: Frankfurt, Germany

Oktagon 94: Eckerlin vs. Kozma was a mixed martial arts event held by Oktagon MMA on September 26, 2026, in Frankfurt, Germany.

=== Background ===
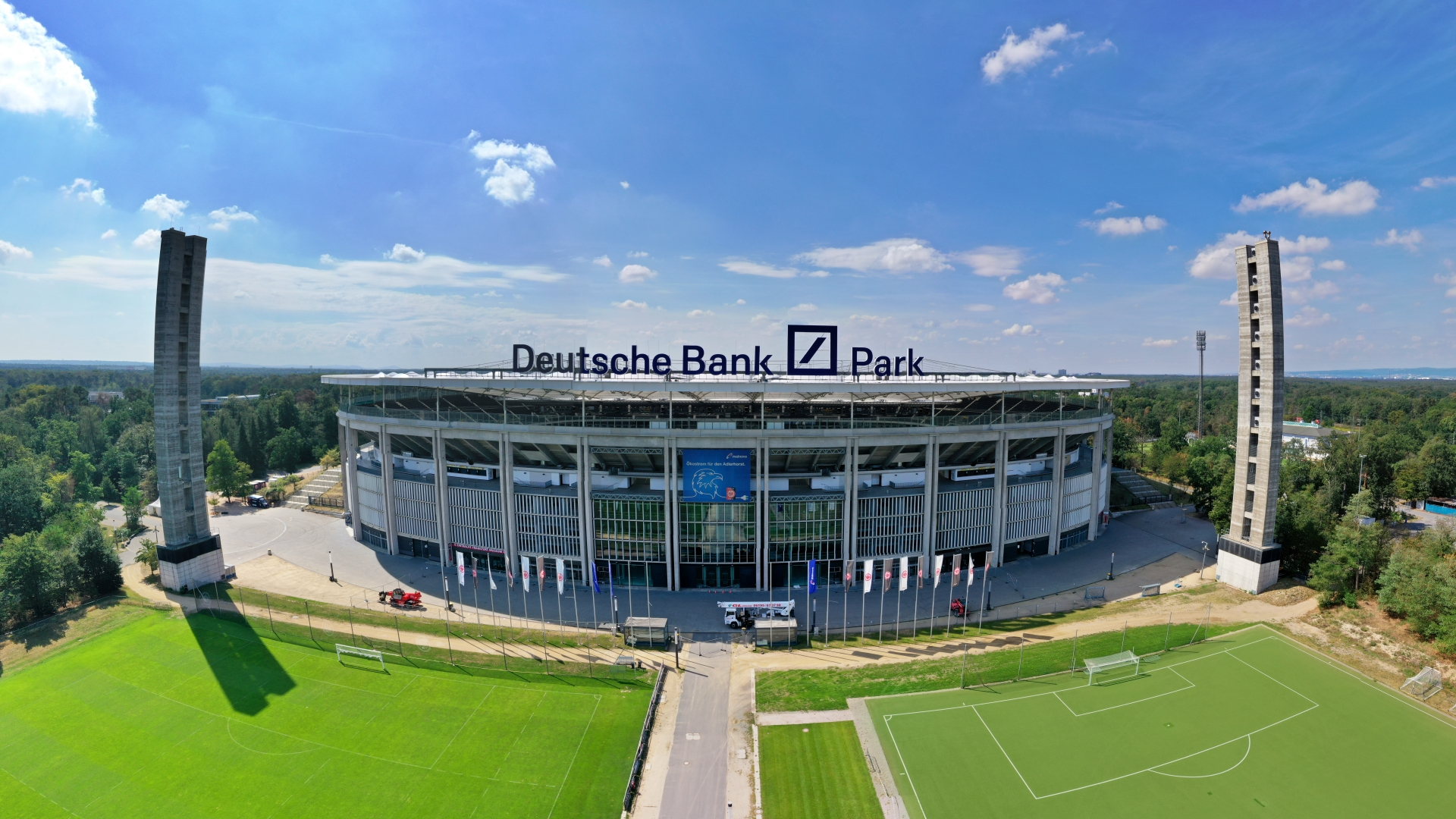
The Deutsche Bank Park – home of Eintracht Frankfurt, hosted the event for the second time, following Oktagon 62 in October 2024. The stadium was shattered the world record for MMA event packed the attendance at 59,148 fans.

A 176-pounds catchweight bout between Christian Eckerlin and former Oktagon Welterweight Champion David Kozma headlined the event.

=== Bonus awards ===
The following fighter received bonuses.

- Fight of the Night (€10,000): Max Coga vs. Christian Jungwirth
- Performance of the Night (€5,000): Karlos Vémola

=== Results ===
Main card (DAZN)
Weight class				Method	Round	Time	Notes
Catchweight (176 lb)	David Kozma	def.	Christian Eckerlin	Submission (rear-naked choke)	1	4:58
Welterweight	Max Coga	def.	Christian Jungwirth	Decision (unanimous) (29–28, 30–27, 29–28)	3	5:00
Catchweight (196 lb)	Karlos Vémola	def.	Frederic Vosgröne	TKO (punches)	2	2:50
Lightweight	Fedor Duric	def.	Marc Diakiese	Decision (unanimous) (30–27, 30–27, 30–27)	3	5:00
Catchweight (176 lb)	Edmon Avagyan	def.	Dominic Schober	TKO (punches)	1	2:53	(Note: Oktagon "Stand and Bang" Rules (3R / 3min).)
Preliminary card (DAZN)
Featherweight	Deniz Ilbay	def.	Hugo Vach	KO (punch)	1	2:23
Middleweight	Jamie Cordero	def.	Robert Pukač	TKO (body kick and punches)	1	3:55
Welterweight	Tamerlan Dulatov	def.	Nikola Janković	Technical Submission (triangle choke)	1	1:24
Bantamweight	Raul Lemberanskij	def.	Roman Paulus	Decision (unanimous) (30–27, 30–27, 30–27)	3	5:00
Free Prelims (YouTube)
Welterweight	Michael Obodozie	def.	Oskar Staszczak	TKO (punches)	1	1:04

== Oktagon 95: Škvor vs. Narkun ==
Oktagon 95: Škvor vs. Narkun
- Promotion: Oktagon MMA
- Date: October 17, 2026
- Venue: Mattoni Arena
- City: Karlovy Vary, Czech Republic

Oktagon 95: Škvor vs. Narkun was a mixed martial arts event held by Oktagon MMA on October 17, 2026, in Karlovy Vary, Czech Republic.

=== Background ===
A middleweight bout between former Oktagon Middleweight Champion Patrik Kincl and Dominik Humburger was scheduled to headline the event. However at the weigh-ins, Humburger weighed in at 187.3 pounds (first attempt weighed in at 189 pounds), 1.3 pounds over the middleweight limit. Therefore, the bout has been cancelled after Kincl has declined to fight at a catchweight.

As a results, a light heavyweight bout between Daniel Škvor and former KSW Light Heavyweight Champion Tomasz Narkun was promoted to new headliner instead.

On September 27, two lightweight fights originally scheduled for the event were cancelled including: Alex Hutyra vs. František Fodor and Nick Stamidis vs. Ahmad Halimson, due to Hutyra and Stamidis were being injured.

=== Bonus awards ===
The following fighter received €5,000 bonus.

- Performance of the Night: Marco Novák

=== Results ===
Main card (DAZN)
Weight class				Method	Round	Time	Notes
Light Heavyweight	Tomasz Narkun	def.	Daniel Škvor	Submission (rear-naked choke)	1	2:29
Welterweight	Matúš Juráček	def.	Jozef Wittner	TKO (punches)	3	3:17
Flyweight	Aaron Aby	def.	David Dvořák	Decision (split) (29–28, 28–29, 29–28)	3	5:00
Light Heavyweight	Timo Feucht	def.	Zdeněk Polívka	TKO (punches)	1	0:13
Preliminary card (DAZN)
Catchweight (152 lb)	Václav Štěpán	def.	Aria Azarnoosh	Decision (unanimous) (30–27, 30–27, 30–27)	3	5:00
Light Heavyweight	Robin Fošum	def.	Tomáš Klabík	Decision (unanimous) (29–28, 29–28, 29–28)	3	3:00	(Note: Oktagon "Stand and Bang" Rules (3R / 3min).)
Featherweight	Marco Novák	def.	Anatolij Baal	KO (knees and elbows)	1	0:57
Welterweight	Viktor Červinský	def.	Daniel Hromek	Decision (unanimous) (30–27, 29–28, 29–28)	3	5:00
Catchweight (159 lb)	Husein Kadimagomaev	def.	Marco Elpidio	Decision (unanimous) (30–27, 30–27, 29–28)	3	5:00	(Note: Elpidio missed weight (160 lb).)
Free Prelims: Amateur bout (YouTube)
Lightweight	Rakhim Iliskhanov	def.	Patrik Pikeš	Decision (split) (28–29, 29–28, 29–28)	3	3:00

== Oktagon 96: Gogoladze vs. Ayari ==
Oktagon 96: Gogoladze vs. Ayari
- Promotion: Oktagon MMA
- Date: October 31, 2026
- Venue: SAP Garden
- City: Munich, Germany

Oktagon 96: Gogoladze vs. Ayari was a mixed martial arts event held by Oktagon MMA on October 31, 2026, in Munich, Germany.

=== Background ===
A Oktagon Welterweight Championship bout for the vacant title between Amiran Gogoladze and undefeated contender Felix Klinkhammer was scheduled to headline the event. However, Klinkhammer withdrew from the event during the fight week due to an injury and was replaced by Jessin Ayari. Ayari was originally scheduled to face former champion Ion Surdu, but Surdu withdrew for unknown reasons and Kevin Pastran replacement to fight, before Ayari was moved to face Gogoladze.

Gökhan Aksu was originally scheduled to face Niko Samsonidse in a lightweight bout, but Samsonidse pulled out due to an injury and was replaced by Rene Runge.

Hafeni Nafuka and Ivan Klevets were scheduled to meet in a 72 kg (159 pounds) catchweight bout, which was the final addition to the event. Due to Nafuka missed weight for the limit at 3 kg (6.3 pounds), and was removed from the event. In a late minute, Ronaldo Ferreira, who is Nafuka's corner team, stepped in to face Klevets instead.

=== Results ===
Main card (DAZN)
Weight class				Method	Round	Time	Notes
Welterweight	Amiran Gogoladze	def.	Jessin Ayari	Decision (unanimous) (49–46, 49–46, 49–46)	5	5:00	(Note: For the vacant Oktagon Welterweight Championship.)
Welterweight	Ronald Paradeiser	def.	Tyrone Pfeifer	Decision (unanimous) (30–27, 30–27, 30–27)	3	5:00
Heavyweight	Lazar Todev	def.	Simon Biyong	Decision (split) (29–28, 28–29, 29–28)	3	5:00
Catchweight (161 lb)	Gökhan Aksu	def.	Rene Runge	TKO (punches)	1	1:58
Bantamweight	Michael Deiga-Scheck	def.	Lukáš Chotěnovský	Decision (unanimous) (29–28, 29–28, 29–28)	3	5:00
Preliminary card (DAZN)
Middleweight	Marek Bartl	def.	Brian Manning	TKO (punches)	1	3:03
Welterweight	Endrit Brajshori	def.	Christian Mach	TKO (punches)	1	4:38
Featherweight	Henrique Madureira	def.	Daniel Schordje	Decision (unanimous) (30–27, 29–28, 29–28)	3	5:00
Catchweight (159 lb)	Ivan Klevets	def.	Ronaldo Ferreira	Decision (unanimous) (29–28, 30–27, 30–27)	3	5:00
Welterweight	Burak Kizilirmak	def.	Kevin Hangs	TKO (punches)	1	1:54	(Note: Hangs missed weight (173 lb).)
Free Prelims (YouTube)
Lightweight	Abdulmalik Aliev	def.	Marat Nessar	Decision (unanimous) (29–27, 29–27, 30–26)	3	5:00	(Note: Nessar missed weight (158.7 lb).)

== Oktagon 97: Severino vs. Holzer ==
Oktagon 97: Severino vs. Holzer
- Promotion: Oktagon MMA
- Date: November 7, 2026
- Venue: ZAG-Arena
- City: Hanover, Germany

Oktagon 97: Severino vs. Holzer was a mixed martial arts event held by Oktagon MMA on November 7, 2026, in Hanover, Germany.

=== Background ===
A Oktagon Bantamweight Championship bout between current champion Igor Severino and undefeated prospect Max Holzer (who's moving down a weight class) headlined the event.

A middleweight bout between Jan Holzer and Rastislav Zvara was scheduled for the event. However, Zvara withdrew from the event due to a knee injury and was replaced by Ján Švagerko.

Matheus Severino and Abdul Karim Badakhshi are scheduled to meet in a flyweight bout. However, Badakhshi pulled out and was replaced by Mohammed Walid, which the bout changed to bantamweight contest.

=== Results ===
Main card (DAZN)
Weight class				Method	Round	Time	Notes
Bantamweight	Igor Severino (c)	def.	Max Holzer	TKO (punches)	1	0:54	(Note: For the Oktagon Bantamweight Championship.)
Featherweight	Gjoni Palokaj	def.	Zafar Mohsen	Submission (triangle choke)	2	3:12
Catchweight (159 lb)	Ozan Aslaner	def.	Denis Frimpong	TKO (punches)	1	4:16
Middleweight	Justin Detzel	def.	Kacper Frątczak	Decision (unanimous) (30–26, 30–27, 30–27)	3	5:00
Featherweight	Karol Ryšavý	def.	Samuel Bark	DQ (illegal knee)	1	2:49
Welterweight	Petr Bartoněk	def.	Daniel Makin	Submission (rear-naked choke)	3	2:29
Preliminary card (DAZN)
Featherweight	Haci Akseker	def.	Jonatan Kujawa	TKO (punches and elbows)	2	1:25
Welterweight	Jan Holzer	def.	Ján Švagerko	Submission (guillotine choke)	1	1:52
Featherweight	Islam Djabrailov	def.	Kenji Bortoluzzi	Submission (guillotine choke)	2	0:49
Women's Strawweight	Josefine Lindgren Knutsson	def.	Yasmin Guimarães	Decision (unanimous) (30–27, 30–27, 29–28)	3	5:00	(Note: Guimarães missed weight (122.8 lb).)
Flyweight	Matheus Severino	def.	Mohammed Walid	KO (punch)	1	1:49
Free Prelims (YouTube)
Women's Bantamweight	Kathrin Haberle	def.	Poliana Albuquerque	TKO (punch to the body and knee)	1	2:29

== Oktagon 98: Batfalský vs. De Paepe ==
Oktagon 98: Batfalský vs. De Paepe
- Promotion: Oktagon MMA
- Date: November 21, 2026
- Venue: Werk Arena
- City: Třinec, Czech Republic

Oktagon 98: Batfalský vs. De Paepe was a mixed martial arts event held by Oktagon MMA on November 21, 2026, in Třinec, Czech Republic.

=== Background ===
A Oktagon Lightweight Championship bout between the reigning two-time champion Mateusz Legierski and former champion Ivan Buchinger (who is also a former Oktagon Featherweight Champion) was scheduled to headline the event. However, in the final seconds before their walkouts, Legierski had to withdraw due to torn hamstring injury during warm-ups. Therefore, a featherweight bout between Jakub Batfalský and Ayton De Paepe inadvertently headlined the event.

Matěj Peňáz was scheduled to face Kamil Oniszczuk in a middleweight bout at this event, but Oniszczuk withdrew from the bout due to an injury, so the bout was cancelled.

Mateusz Janur was originally scheduled to face Hojat Khajevand in a middleweight bout, but Khajevand withdrew due to an injury and was replaced by David Hošek.

Ondřej Raška was scheduled to face Dominic Schober in a middleweight bout, but Schober withdrew for unknown reasons and was replaced by Ahmet Rasim Pala.

At the weigh-ins, Patrik Šebek weighed in at 157 pounds, one pound over the lightweight limit and he will be fined a percentage of his purse, which will go to Adrian Hamerski. In addition, a lightweight bout between Dawid Śmiełowski and Arbi Mezhidov was removed from the event due to Śmiełowski missed weight for the limit at 71.5 kg (157.6 pounds), which exceeded the promotion allowed limit by 900 grams.

=== Results ===
Main card (DAZN)
Weight class				Method	Round	Time	Notes
Featherweight	Jakub Batfalský	def.	Ayton De Paepe	Decision (split) (28–29, 29–28, 29–28)	3	5:00
Women's Flyweight	Veronika Smolková	def.	Ivana Petrović	Decision (unanimous) (30–27, 30–27, 30–27)	3	5:00
Catchweight (163 lb)	Tomáš Mudroch	def.	Jason Ponet	Submission (triangle armbar)	1	0:28
Catchweight (152 lb)	Dominik Tabor	def.	Deniz Ilbay	Decision (unanimous) (29–28, 29–28, 29–28)	3	3:00	(Note: Oktagon Underground Rules (3R / 3min).)
Catchweight (190 lb)	Mateusz Janur	def.	David Hošek	Submission (guillotine choke)	2	4:18
Preliminary card (DAZN)
Middleweight	Martin Prázdný	def.	Jindřich Byrtus	Decision (unanimous) (30–26, 29–25, 30–26)	3	3:00	(Note: Oktagon "Stand and Bang" rules (3R / 3min).)
Catchweight (190 lb)	Ondřej Raška	def.	Ahmet Rasim Pala	Decision (unanimous) (29–28, 29–28, 29–28)	3	5:00
Lightweight	Patrik Šebek	def.	Adrian Hamerski	Submission (rear-naked choke)	2	2:47
Featherweight	James Hendin	def.	Sayed Murtaza Sadat	KO (punches)	3	0:31
Free Prelims (YouTube)
Women's Flyweight	Marta Sós	def.	Michaela Hlaváčiková	Submission (rear-naked choke)	1	2:55

== Oktagon 99: Aras vs. Flores ==
Oktagon 99: Aras vs. Flores
- Promotion: Oktagon MMA
- Date: December 5, 2026
- Venue: Westfalenhalle
- City: Dortmund, Germany

Oktagon 99: Aras vs. Flores will be a mixed martial arts event held by Oktagon MMA on December 5, 2026, in Dortmund, Germany.

=== Background ===
A heavyweight bout between Kasim Aras and PFL veteran Ty Flores is scheduled to headline the event.

A heavyweight bout between Marc Doussis and Adam Pałasz was scheduled at the event. However, Pałasz withdrew from the event due to an injury and the bout was cancelled.

=== Fight card ===
Main card (DAZN)
Weight class				Method	Round	Time	Notes
Heavyweight	Kasim Aras	vs.	Ty Flores
Catchweight (152 lb)	Khalid Taha	vs.	João Pedro Saldanha
Catchweight (190 lb)	Matěj Peňáz	vs.	Jonathan Figueroa
Heavyweight	Patrick Vespaziani	vs.	Nicolaj Wagner
Heavyweight	Marc Doussis	vs.	Adam Pałasz
Bantamweight	Ali Gündüz	vs.	Abdullah Sultani
Welterweight	Emir-Can Al	vs.	Adam Havran
Lightweight	Murat Tüysüz	vs.	Jan Stanovský
Lightweight	Altin Zenuni	vs.	Tomáš Cigánik
Welterweight	Iwan Tagner	vs.	Bedirhan Kabak
Featherweight	Mohamed Eter	vs.	Tomáš Holeček
Catchweight (151 lb)	Ahmad Chikh Mousa	vs.	Zinedine El Mahdi
Light Heavyweight	Harun Uzun	vs.	Aleksandar Stefanovic
Amateur bout
Lightweight	Furkan Ugur	vs.	Said Osmanov

== Oktagon 100: Jotko vs. Muradov ==
Oktagon 100: Jotko vs. Muradov
- Promotion: Oktagon MMA
- Date: December 29, 2026
- Venue: O_{2} Arena
- City: Prague, Czech Republic

Oktagon 100: Jotko vs. Muradov will be a mixed martial arts event held by Oktagon MMA on December 29, 2026, in Prague, Czech Republic.

=== Background ===
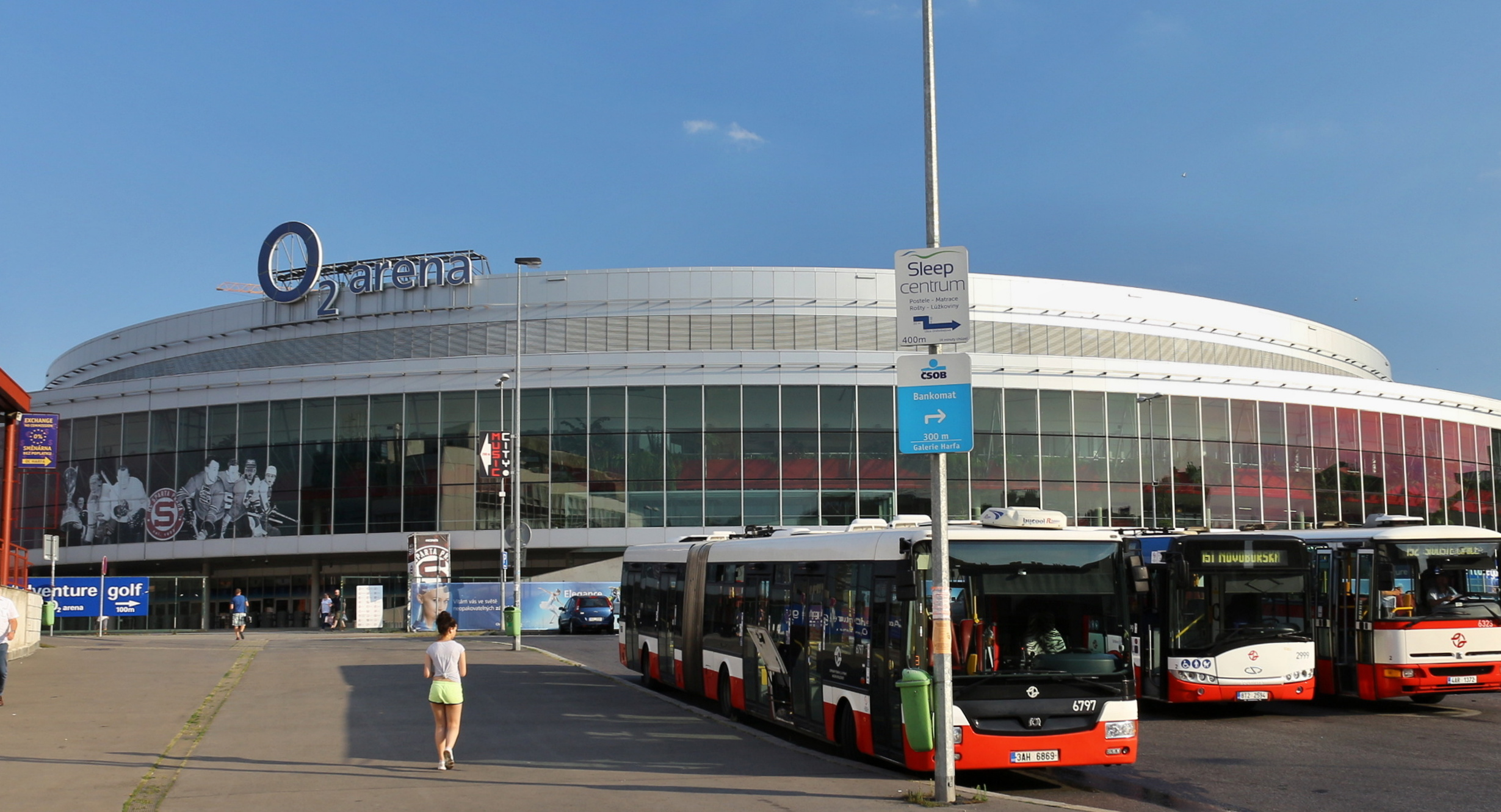
The O_{2} Arena in Prague, will host the 100th numbered event of the organization, since its inception just ten years ago.

A Oktagon Middleweight Championship bout between the reigning champion Krzysztof Jotko and current interim champion (also the reigning Oktagon Light Heavyweight Champion) Makhmud Muradov is scheduled for the event. They were initially scheduled to compete at UFC Fight Night: Ortega vs. The Korean Zombie in October 2020, before the bout being moved to UFC Fight Night: Hall vs. Silva in two weeks later. In turn, Jotko withdrew from the bout due to an injury and was replaced by Kevin Holland.

Josef Hála and Vladimír Lengál is scheduled is scheduled to compete for the inaugural 75 kg (165 pounds) Oktagon title under "Stand and Bang" rules at the co-main event. This will mark the first title match under "Stand and Bang" rules.

Former Oktagon Middleweight and Light Heavyweight Champion Karlos Vémola and former KSW Light Heavyweight Champion Tomasz Narkun are scheduled to meet in a light heavyweight bout.

UFC veteran Luke Barnatt is scheduled to make his return to combat sports after retirement since December 2020, against former Bellator Middleweight World champion Attila Végh in a catchweight of 98 kg (216 pounds) bout under the "Stand and Bang" rules.

Marek Mazúch is scheduled to move up to light heavyweight division against Robin Fošum.

=== Fight card ===
Main card (DAZN)
Weight class				Method	Round	Time	Notes
Middleweight	Krzysztof Jotko (c)	vs.	Makhmud Muradov (ic)				(Note: For the Oktagon Middleweight Championship.)
Catchweight (165 lb)	Josef Hála	vs.	Vladimír Lengál				(Note: For the inaugural Oktagon "Stand and Bang" 75 kg Championship.)
Light Heavyweight	Karlos Vémola	vs.	Tomasz Narkun
Catchweight (216 lb)	Attila Végh	vs.	Luke Barnatt				(Note: Oktagon "Stand and Bang" rules (3R / 3min).)
Light Heavyweight	Robin Fošum	vs.	Marek Mazúch

== See also ==
- List of current Oktagon MMA fighters
- 2026 in UFC
- 2026 in ONE Championship
- 2026 in Professional Fighters League
- 2026 in Cage Warriors
- 2026 in Absolute Championship Akhmat
- 2026 in Konfrontacja Sztuk Walki
- 2026 in Legacy Fighting Alliance
- 2026 in Rizin Fighting Federation
- 2026 in LUX Fight League
- 2026 in Brave Combat Federation
