= Orinta van der Zee =

Dutch kickboxer

- Born: 1984 (age 41–42); Haarlem, Netherlands
- Height: 1.73 m (5 ft 8 in)
- Weight: 61 kg (134 lb; 9 st 8 lb)
- Division: Lightweight
- Style: Muay Thai, Kickboxing
- Stance: Orthodox
- Fighting out of: Haarlem, Netherlands
- Team: Elite Training Center; Vos Gym; Team Real Toro
- Trainer: Ivan Hippolyte, Kamal Chabrani

Kickboxing record
- Total: 31
- Wins: 28
- By knockout: 5
- Losses: 2
- Draws: 1

Other information
- University: Nova College Haarlem
- Spouse: Jorge Loren

Orinta van der Zee is a retired Dutch kickboxer.

== Biography and career ==
Van der Zee was introduced to kickboxing at the age of seven through an uncle who taught in Haarlem. She then joined Vos Gym to turn professional.

Van der Zee was scheduled to face former boxing world champion Myriam Lamare in a full contact bout at "La Nuit des Champions 2008" event. She lost the fight by decision.

On September 26, 2009, van der Zoo took part in a 4-women tournament at the Time2Fight event. In semifinals she defeated Hatice Özyurt by technical knockout. In the final she faced reigning ISKA world champion Jorina Baars and defeated her by unanimous decision.

Van der Zee faced Helen Garnett at the "Duel at the Dome" event on November 27, 2010, for the vacant WMC European 66 kg title. She won the fight by unanimous decision.

On September 16, 2017, Van der Zee faced Niamh Kinehan at Enfusion #52 for the vacant Enfusion Women's Bantamweight (-61kg) title. She won the bout by split decision.

== Championships and accomplishments ==
- Enfusion
  - 2017 Enfusion Women's Bantamweight (-61kg) Champion
- World Muaythai Council
  - 2011 WMC MAD European 66 kg Champion
- Time2Fight
  - 2009 Time2Fight Ladies Tournament Winner

== Fight record ==
Kickboxing and Muay Thai record
29 wins (5 (T)KOs), 3 losses, 1 draw
Date	Result	Opponent	Event	Location	Method	Round	Time
2017-12-08	Win	(France) Nora Cornolle	Enfusion Live 59	Abu Dhabi, United Arab Emirates	Ext.R Decision	4	3:00
2017-09-16	Win	(United Kingdom) Niamh Kinehan	Enfusion 52	Zwolle, Netherlands	Decision (Split)	5	2:00
Wins the vacant Enfusion Women's Bantamweight (-61kg) title.
2017-05-20	Loss	(Belgium) Anke Van Gestel	Battle Royal	Mariakerke, Belgium	Decision (Unanimous)	3	3:00
2016-02-28	Win	(Netherlands) Lorena Klijn	Haarlem Fight Night	Haarlem, Netherlands	Decision (Unanimous)	3	3:00
2015-10-18	Loss	(Netherlands) Ilona Wijmans	World Fighting League, Final	Hoofddorp, Netherlands	Decision (Unanimous)	3	3:00
2015-10-18	Win	(Netherlands) Sarah Debaieb	World Fighting League, Semifinals	Hoofddorp, Netherlands	Decision (Unanimous)	3	3:00
2011-01-08	Win	(Spain) Mar Rodriguez	K-1 Max Madrid	Madrid, Spain	Decision (Unanimous)	3	3:00
2010-11-27	Win	(United Kingdom) Helene Garnett	Duel at the Dome	Doncaster, United Kingdom	Decision (Unanimous)	5	3:00
Wins the WMC MAD European 66kg title.
2009-09-26	Win	(Netherlands) Jorina Baars	Time2Fight - Ladies Tournament, Final	Hoorn, Netherlands	Decision	5	3:00
2009-09-26	Win	(Netherlands) Hatice Özyurt	Time2Fight - Ladies Tournament, Semifinals	Hoorn, Netherlands	TKO (retirement)		
2009-03-08	Win	(Morocco) Rachida Hilali	Beatdown 10	Amsterdam, Netherlands	Decision	3	3:00
2008-11-29	Loss	(France) Myriam Lamare	La Nuit des Champions	Marseille, France	Decision (Unanimous)	5	2:00
2008-11-08	Win	(United Kingdom) Zoe Mason	WFCA: Ice Cold Assassins	Amsterdam, Netherlands	Decision	5	2:00
2007-10-28	Win	(Netherlands) Marloes Merza	Hoofddorp Fight Night 2007	Hoofddorp, Netherlands	Decision	5	3:00
2006-11-25	Draw	(Netherlands) Colette van de Ham	Beatdown 3	Amsterdam, Netherlands	Decision	5	2:00
2006-06-18	Win	(Belgium) Najat Hasnouni-Alaoui	Berchem Fight Night 2006	Berchem, Belgium	Decision	5	2:00
2006-02-04	Win	(Netherlands) Marloes Coenen	Rumble Of Amsterdam 2	Amsterdam, Netherlands	Decision	5	2:00
Legend: Win Loss Draw/No contest Notes

Amateur Kickboxing and Muay Thai record
Date	Result	Opponent	Event	Location	Method	Round	Time
2005-06-25	Win	(Netherlands) Fiona Lampers	2 Hot 2 Handle	Badhoevedorp, Netherlands	Decision	3	2:00
2005-04-24	Win	(Netherlands) Jessica van Hoof	Bushido Europe	Amsterdam, Netherlands	Decision	3	2:00
2005-03-05	Win	(Morocco) Rachida Hilali	Kumite Holland 3	Hilversum, Netherlands	Decision	3	2:00
2005-02-05	Win	(Netherlands) Angelique Ammerlaan	Fight 4 Life	Amsterdam, Netherlands	TKO		
2004-11-21	Win	(Netherlands) Simone Vergeer	Battle Under The Tower 2004	Steenwijk, Netherlands	Decision	3	2:00
Legend: Win Loss Draw/No contest Notes

== See also ==
- List of female kickboxers
