= Niamh Kinehan =

English competitive fighter (born 1999)

- Born: Niamh Charlotte Kinehan; 22 April 1999 (age 27); Wythenshawe, Manchester, England
- Height: 170 cm (5 ft 7 in)
- Weight: 61 kg (134.5 lb; 9.6 st)
- Style: Muay Thai
- Stance: Southpaw
- Fighting out of: Manchester, England
- Team: Franks Gym, Wythenshawe

Kickboxing record
- Total: 30
- Wins: 24
- By knockout: 9
- Losses: 5
- By knockout: 0
- Draws: 1

Mixed martial arts record
- Total: 3
- Wins: 3
- By knockout: 2
- By decision: 1
- Losses: 0

Other information
- Mixed martial arts record from Sherdog

Niamh Kinehan (born 4 April 1999) is an English mixed martial artist, kickboxer and Muay Thai fighter. She is a former WBC, WMO and ISKA Muay Thai 135 lbs world champion.

Kinehan has continually been considered a top 10 pound-for-pound muay thai fighter in the world by the WMO and Combat Press since the creation of the rankings in July 2023 and February 2024.

== Muay Thai and kickboxing career ==
=== Early career ===
Kinehan made her A-class debut on November 26, 2016, when she faced Anke Van Gestel at Prime Time 7. She lost the fight by unanimous decision.

Kinehan and Anke Van Gestel rematched on March 24, 2017, for the Enfusion -64 kg title at Enfusion 48. She lost the fight by decision.

On September 16, 2017, Kinehan faced Orinta van der Zee at Enfusion #52 for the Enfusion -61 kg title. She lost the bout by split decision.

Kinehan rematched Nora Cornolle in the semifinals of the Enfusion Reality Tournament on June 20, 2017. She lost by decision.

On September 9, 2018, Kinehan travelled to Shangqiu, China, to face Wang Cong in the quarterfinals bout of an eight women one night night tournament at Kunlun Fight 76. She lost the fight by unanimous decision.

On November 18, 2018, Kinehan faced Sarah Worsfold for the KGP -61 kg title at Muay Thai Grand Prix 21. She won the fight by unanimous decision.

On June 29, 2019, Kinehan faced Isa Tiblad for the vacant MTGP World -61 kg title at Muay Thai Grand Prix 27. She won the fight by unanimous decision.

On March 7, 2020, Kinehan faced Stéphanie Ielo Page at YOKKAO 47–48. She won the fight by unanimous decision.

On December 3, 2021, Kinehan travelled to the United States to face Ashley Smallwood at Lion Fight 72. She won the fight by doctor stoppage in the third round.

=== World Champion ===
On February 12, 2022, Kinehan faced Ludovica Ciarpaglini for the vacant WBC Muaythai lightweight world title. She won the fight by unanimous decision.

Kinehan successfully defende her WBC Muaythai world lightweight on June 25, 2022, when she defeated Shannon Gardiner by unanimous decision at Muay Thai Grand Prix Australia.

On June 10, 2023, Kinehan faced Kèro Riefstahl for the WMO World lightweight title at Hitman Fight League 2. She won the fight by unanimous decision making her a simultaneous WBC, WMO and ISKA world champion.

On August 10, 2024, Kinehan faced Michaela Hlavacikova for the vacant WKA Muay Thai world lightweight title. She won by unanimous decision.

On February 25, 2025, Kinehan traveled to Perth, Australia to defend her WBC Muay Thai world title against Kaitlyn Tucker. She won the fight by fourth-round technical knockout.

On March 4, 2025, Kinehan announced her retirement from Muay Thai after running out of challenges and a transition to MMA.

== Titles and accomplishments ==
=== Professional ===
- World Boxing Council Muaythai
  - 2022 WBC Muaythai World Lightweight (135 lbs) Champion
    - Three successful title defenses
  - 2022 WBC Muaythai Female Fighter of the Year
- World Muaythai Organization
  - 2023 WMO World Lightweight (135 lbs) Champion
  - 2024 WMO World Super Lightweight (140 lbs) Champion
- Muay Thai Grand Prix
  - 2018 KGP Super-lightweight (63.5 kg) Champion
    - One successful title defense
  - 2019 MTGP World Lightweight (-61 kg) Champion
- International Sport Kickboxing Association
  - 2022 ISKA Muay Thai World Lightweight (135 lbs) Champion
- World Kickboxing Association
  - 2024 WKA Muay Thai World Lightweight (135 lbs) Champion
- World Karate and Kickboxing Union
  - 2018 WKU Muay Thai European 61 kg Champion

=== Amateur ===
- International Federation of Muaythai Associations
  - 2014 IFMA World Championship Junior -60 kg (gold)
  - 2015 IFMA Royal World Cup Junior -63.5 kg (gold)

== Mixed martial arts record ==
Professional record breakdown
3 matches	3 wins	0 losses
By knockout	2	0
By decision	1	0

Res.	Record	Opponent	Method	Event	Date	Round	Time	Location	Notes
		Alina Dalaslan		Oktagon 101	January 16, 2027			Stuttgart, Germany	For the vacant Oktagon Women's Bantamweight Championship
Win	3–0	Alana Cook	TKO (punches)	Oktagon 93	September 12, 2026	2	0:48	Brno, Czech Republic	
Win	2–0	Emilia Czerwińska	TKO (punches)	Oktagon 86	April 11, 2026	3	4:48	Szczecin, Poland	Catchweight (130 lb) bout.
Win	1–0	Michaela Hlaváčiková	Decision (unanimous)	Oktagon 74	August 9, 2025	3	5:00	Prague, Czech Republic	Bantamweight debut.

== Muay Thai and Kickboxing record ==
Professional Muay Thai and Kickboxing record
23 Wins (8 (T)KOs), 5 Losses, 1 Draws
Date	Result	Opponent	Event	Location	Method	Round	Time
2025-02-25	Win	(New Zealand) Kaitlyn Tucker	Muay Thai Grand Prix	Perth, Australia	TKO (Referee stoppage)	4	
Defends the WBC Muaythai World Lightweight (135 lbs) title.
2024-11-02	Win	(Portugal) Maria Mariani	SuperShowDown	Bolton, England	TKO (Doctor stoppage)	3	
2024-09-28	Win	(England) Naomi Ridley	Hitman Fight League	Perth, Australia	Decision (Unanimous)	5	2:00
Wins the WMO World Super Lightweight (140 lbs) title.
2024-08-10	Win	(Czech Republic) Michaela Hlavacikova	Hungryside Super Show	Glasgow, Scotland	Decision (Unanimous)	5	2:00
Wins the vacant WKA Muay Thai World Lightweight (135 lbs) title.
2023-06-10	Win	(France) Kèro Riefstahl	Hitman Fight League 2	Manchester, England	Decision (Unanimous)	5	2:00
Wins the vacant WMO World Lightweight (135 lbs) title.
2023-03-04	Win	(France) Hawa Balde	SuperShowdown 5	Bolton, England	Decision (Unanimous)	5	2:00
Defends the WBC Muaythai World Lightweight (135 lbs) title.
2022-09-10	Win	(Poland) Emilka Krupczak	Franks Gym	Manchester, England	KO (Spinning back elbow)	3	
Wins the ISKA Muay Thai World Lightweight (135 lbs) title.
2022-06-25	Win	(Australia) Shannon Gardiner	Muay Thai Grand Prix	Perth, Australia	Decision (Unanimous)	5	2:00
Defends the WBC Muaythai World Lightweight (135 lbs) title.
2022-02-12	Win	(Italy) Ludovica Ciarpaglini	SuperShowDown	Bolton, England	Decision (Unanimous)	5	2:00
Wins the vacant WBC Muaythai World Lightweight (135 lbs) title.
2021-12-03	Win	(United States) Ashley Smallwood	Lion Fight 72	Boston, United States	TKO (Doctor stoppage)	3	1:06
2021-10-24	Win	(Denmark) Eva Schultz	SuperShowdown 1	Bolton, England	TKO (Knees)	1	
2021-10-09	Win	(England) Sarah Worsfold	Road to ONE: Muay Thai Grand Prix	London, England	Decision (Unanimous)	3	3:00
Defends the KGP Super-lightweight (63.5kg) title.
2021-08-07	Win	(Italy) Chiara Vincis	Yokkao 50	London, England	Decision (Unanimous)	5	3:00
2020-03-07	Win	(France) Stéphanie Ielö Page	Yokkao 47-48	Bolton, England	Decision (Unanimous)	5	3:00
2019-10-26	Win	(Spain) Laura De Blas	Yokkao 43-44	Bolton, England	KO (High kick)	3	2:33
2019-06-29	Win	(Sweden) Isa Tiblad	Muay Thai Grand Prix 27	Manchester, England	Decision (Unanimous)	5	3:00
Wins the MTGP World Lightweight (-61kg) title.
2019-03-23	Win	(England) Lucy Payne	Yokkao 38	Bolton, England	Decision (Unanimous)	5	3:00
2019-03-02	Win	(France) Lucie Dumont	Nuit Des Guerriers 3	Pont-à-Mousson, France	Decision	3	3:00
2018-11-18	Win	(England) Sarah Worsfold	Muay Thai Grand Prix 21	London, England	Decision (Unanimous)	3	3:00
Wins the KGP Super-lightweight (63.5kg) title.
2018-10-13	Win	(England) Lucy Lister	Yokkao 31	Manchester, England	KO (High kick)	1	
2018-09-09	Loss	(China) Wang Cong	Kunlun Fight 76 - Legend of Mulan Tournament, Quarter Finals	Shangqiu, China	Decision (Unanimous)	3	3:00
2018-07-21	Win	(France) Laure Bailacq	Muay Thai Grand Prix	Samoens, France	TKO (High kick)		
2018-06-30	Win	(Poland) Emilka Krupczak	Franks Gym	Manchester, England	TKO	1	
Wins the WKU Muay Thai European 61kg title.
2018-02-25	Win	(United Kingdom) Jo Price	Inferno Championship Muay Thai	Liverpool, England	Decision	3	3:00
2017-12-02	Win	(Switzerland) Jessica Marazzi	Franks Gym	Manchester, England	Decision (Unanimous)	3	3:00
2017-09-16	Loss	(Netherlands) Orinta van der Zee	Enfusion 52	Zwolle, Netherlands	Decision (Split)	5	2:00
For the vacant Enfusion Women's Bantamweight (-61kg) title.
2017-06-20	Loss	(France) Nora Cornolle	Enfusion Reality - Final Tournament, Semifinals	Koh Samui, Thailand	Decision (Unanimous)	3	3:00
2017-04-29	Draw	(France) Nora Cornolle	Hanuman Fight 3	Saint-Hilaire-de-Riez, France	Decision (Split)	3	3:00
2017-03-24	Loss	(Belgium) Anke Van Gestel	Enfusion 48	Abu Dhabi, United Arab Emirates	Decision (Unanimous)	5	2:00
For the Enfusion Women's Featherweight (-64kg) Championship title.
2016-11-26	Loss	(Belgium) Anke Van Gestel	Prime Time 7	Merchtem, Belgium	Decision (Unanimous)	3	3:00
Legend: Win Loss Draw/No contest Notes

Amateur Muay Thai record
Date	Result	Opponent	Event	Location	Method	Round	Time
2022-07-16	Loss	(Israel) Nili Block	2022 World Games, Tournament Semifinals	Birmingham, United States	Decision (Unanimous)	3	3:00
2022-07-15	Win	(Poland) Dominika Filec	2022 World Games, Tournament Quarterfinals	Birmingham, United States	Decision (Unanimous)	3	3:00
2016-07-02	Win	(Republic of Ireland) Sarah McGowan	Mayhem	Derry, Northern Ireland	Decision	3	2:00
2016-03-13	Win	(United Kingdom) Ralista Andreva	Beastmasters 2	Nantwich, England	Decision	3	3:00
2015-10-03	Win	(United Kingdom) Orsolya Farkas	MTGP The Contender Cup - Women 63 kg Final	England	Decision (Unanimous)	3	3:00
2015-08-	Win	(Netherlands) Maryem Rayhi	IFMA Royal World Cup 2015, Final	Bangkok, Thailand	TKO	1	
Wins 2015 IFMA Royal World Cup Junior -63.5kg Gold Medal.
2015-08-	Win	(New Zealand) Ihipera Mackay	IFMA Royal World Cup 2015, Semifinals	Bangkok, Thailand	Decision (Unanimous)	3	3:00
2014-09-06	Win	(England) Bee Kolcak	Smash 10	Liverpool, England	Decision (Unanimous)	5	1:30
2014-07-05	Win	(England) Amber Kitchen	Smash 9	Watford, England	TKO (retirement)	1	2:00
2014-05-	Win	(Turkey) Aynur Akar	IFMA World Championship 2014, Final	Langkawi, Malaysia	Decision	3	3:00
Wins 2014 IFMA World Championship Junior -60kg Gold Medal.
2014-05-	Win	(Australia) Carley Gangell	IFMA World Championship 2014, Semifinals	Langkawi, Malaysia	Decision	3	3:00
Legend: Win Loss Draw/No contest Notes

== See also ==
- List of female kickboxers
