= Lucia Szabová =

Slovak mixed martial artist (born 1997)

- Born: December 23, 1997 (age 28); Bratislava, Slovakia
- Other names: Silent Killer
- Height: 5 ft 7 in (170 cm)
- Weight: 134 lb (61 kg; 9 st 8 lb)
- Division: Bantamweight (2020 — present); Flyweight (2026)
- Style: Muay Thai, kickboxing
- Fighting out of: Bratislava, Slovakia
- Team: Hanuman Gym Prague
- Years active: 2020–present

Mixed martial arts record
- Total: 13
- Wins: 13
- By knockout: 5
- By submission: 5
- By decision: 3
- Losses: 0

Other information
- Mixed martial arts record from Sherdog

Lucia Szabová (born December 23, 1997) is a Slovak professional mixed martial artist. She currently competes in the women's bantamweight division of the Ultimate Fighting Championship (UFC). She previously competed in Oktagon MMA, where she is a former women's bantamweight champion and flyweight champion. Szabová is the first (and so far only) woman to become a two-division Oktagon champion, and the third fighter to hold Oktagon titles in two weight classes simultaneously.

== Background ==
Born in Bratislava, Szabová started training in judo and later kickboxing and Muay Thai, becoming the Slovak champion in the latter. In 2019, Szabová competed in the fourth season of Oktagon Challenge, which she won.

== Professional mixed martial arts career ==
=== Oktagon ===
Szabová faced Anzelika Petkevičiute on November 21, 2020, at Oktagon 18. She won the bout by submission in the first round.

Szabová faced Rizlen Zouak on January 30, 2021, at Oktagon 21. She won the bout by submission in the second round.

Szabová faced Christina Netsa on March 27, 2021, at Oktagon 22. She won the bout by knockout in the second round.

Szabová faced Cornelia Holm on July 24, 2021, at Oktagon 26. She won the bout by unanimous decision.

After returning from a three year hiatus, Szabová faced Roza Gumienna at Oktagon 55 on March 23, 2024. She won the bout by submission.

Szabová faced Aitana Álvarez on July 20, 2024, at Oktagon 59: Summer Party. She won the bout by knockout in the second round.

Szabová faced Kalindra Faria on February 22, 2025, at Oktagon 67. She won the bout by submission.

==== Women's Bantamweight and Flyweight Champion ====
Szabová faced Cecile Bolander for the Oktagon Women's Bantamweight Championship on August 9, 2025, at Oktagon 74. She won the title by TKO in the first round.

Szabová was scheduled to face Leidiane Fernandes for the vacant Oktagon Women's Flyweight Championship on at Oktagon 84 on February 14, 2026. However, Fernandes withdrew from the bout due to an injury. The bout was rebooked on April 26, 2026, at Oktagon 87. Szabová won the title by TKO in the third round.

Szabová faced Lucie Pudilová for the Oktagon bantamweight title on August 1, 2026, at Oktagon 92. She defended the title by unanimous decision.

=== Ultimate Fighting Championship ===
On August 25, 2026, it was reported that Szabová had signed with the Ultimate Fighting Championship.

Szabová made her promotional debut against Tainara Lisboa on October 31, 2026, at UFC Fight Night 292. She won the fight by technical knockout in the third round. This fight earned her a $100,000 Performance of the Night award.

== Personal life ==
Szabová has a son who was born in September 2022.

== Championships and accomplishments ==
=== Mixed martial arts ===
- Oktagon MMA
  - Oktagon Women's Bantamweight Championship (One time)
  - Oktagon Women's Flyweight Championship (One time)
  - First female and third overall simultaneous two-weight Champion in Oktagon MMA history
- Ultimate Fighting Championship
  - Performance of the Night (One time) vs. Tainara Lisboa

=== Muay Thai and Kickboxing ===
==== Professional ====
- World Kickboxing Network
  - 2018 WKN 8-Woman Girl Power -62 kg Tournament Winner
- World Karate and Kickboxing Union
  - 2017 WKU Muay Thai Slovakia-60 kg Championship

==== Amateur ====
- World Association of Kickboxing Organizations
  - 2018 WAKO Slovak Open K-1 -60 kg (gold)

== Mixed martial arts record ==
Professional record breakdown
13 matches	13 wins	0 losses
By knockout	5	0
By submission	5	0
By decision	3	0

Res.	Record	Opponent	Method	Event	Date	Round	Time	Location	Notes
Win	13–0	Tainara Lisboa	TKO (punches)	UFC Fight Night: Moicano vs. Nolan	October 31, 2026	3	3:20	Las Vegas, Nevada, United States	Performance of the Night.
Win	12–0	Lucie Pudilová	Decision (unanimous)	Oktagon 92	August 1, 2026	5	5:00	Prague, Czech Republic	Defended the Oktagon Women's Bantamweight Championship.
Win	11–0	Leidiane Fernandes	TKO (elbows and punches)	Oktagon 87	April 25, 2026	3	2:12	Liberec, Czech Republic	Flyweight debut. Won the vacant Oktagon Women's Flyweight Championship.
Win	10–0	Cecile Bolander	TKO (elbows and punches)	Oktagon 74	August 9, 2025	1	3:11	Prague, Czech Republic	Won the Oktagon Women's Bantamweight Championship.
Win	9–0	Kalindra Faria	Submission (keylock)	Oktagon 67	February 23, 2025	1	4:16	Třinec, Czech Republic	
Win	8–0	Aitana Álvarez	Decision (decision)	Oktagon 59	July 20, 2024	3	5:00	Bratislava, Slovakia	Catchweight (131 lb) bout.
Win	7–0	Róża Gumienna	Submission (armbar)	Oktagon 55	March 23, 2024	3	4:38	Stuttgart, Germany	
Win	6–0	Cornelia Holm	Decision (unanimous)	Oktagon 26	July 24, 2021	3	5:00	Bratislava, Slovakia	
Win	5–0	Christina Netza	KO (head kick)	Oktagon 22	March 27, 2021	1	1:30	Brno, Czech Republic	
Win	4–0	Rizlen Zouak	Submission (armbar)	Oktagon 21	January 30, 2021	2	1:25	Brno, Czech Republic	
Win	3–0	Anželika Petkevičiūtė	Submission (armbar)	Oktagon 18	November 21, 2020	1	0:43	Brno, Czech Republic	
Win	2–0	Michaela Dostalova	TKO (punches)	Oktagon 4 Challenge Qualification: Semifinal 2	September 1, 2019	1	4:28	Bratislava, Slovakia	
Win	1–0	Kamila Eliášová	Submission (armbar)	Oktagon 4 Challenge Qualification: Quarterfinals 4	August 22, 2019	1	1:31	Bratislava, Slovakia	Bantamweight debut.

== Muay Thai and Kickboxing record ==
Professional Muay Thai and Kickboxing record
Date	Result	Opponent	Event	Location	Method	Round	Time
2023-11-04	Win	(Czech Republic) Marcela Šafránová	Hanuman Cup 46	Bratislava, Slovakia	Decision (unanimous)	3	3:00
2023-03-31	Loss	(Czech Republic) Michaela Hlaváčiková	MTO Fight Night	Olomouc, Czech Republic	Decision (split)	3	3:00
2019-04-06	Win	(Poland) Dominika Filec	Hanuman Cup 40	Bratislava, Slovakia	TKO	2	
2018-12-07	Win	(Austria) Nina Scheucher	Hanuman Cup 39	Bratislava, Slovakia	Decision (unanimous)	3	3:00
2018-09-19	Win	(Czech Republic) Tereza Dvořáková	Noc válečníků 15 - Girl Power 7 Tournament, Final	Wrocław, Poland	Decision (unanimous)	3	2:00
Wins WKN Girl Power -62kg Tournament title.
2018-09-19	Win	(Italy) Paola Cappucci	Noc válečníků 15 - Girl Power 7 Tournament, Semifinals	Wrocław, Poland	Decision (unanimous)	3	2:00
2018-09-19	Win	(Czech Republic) Zarina Apakova	Noc válečníků 15 Girl - Power 7 Tournament, Quarterfinals	Wrocław, Poland	Decision (unanimous)	3	2:00
2018-05-12	Win	(Poland) Kamila Bałanda	Ladies Fight Night 9	Wrocław, Poland	Decision (unanimous)	3	3:00
2017-10-14	Win	(Ukraine) Viktoria Evtushenko	Hanuman Cup 35	Bratislava, Slovakia	Decision (unanimous)	3	3:00
2017-06-24	Win	(Slovakia) Viktória Lipianská	Hanuman Cup 34	Bratislava, Slovakia	TKO (doctor stoppage)	2	
Wins the WKU Muay Thai Slovakia -60kg title.
2017-03-18	Win	(Slovakia) Petra Částková	Hanuman Cup 33	Bratislava, Slovakia	Decision (unanimous)	3	2:00
Legend: Win Loss Draw/No contest Notes

Amateur Muay Thai & Kickboxing record
Date	Result	Opponent	Event	Location	Method	Round	Time
2019-07-25	Loss	(Israel) Nili Block	2019 IFMA World Championships, Tournament Quarterfinals	Bangkok, Thailand	Decision (29:28)	3	3:00
2019-07-22	Win	(Peru) Elisabeth van der Molen	2019 IFMA World Championships, Tournament Opening Round	Bangkok, Thailand	Decision (29:28)	3	3:00
2019-04-13	Loss	(Netherlands) Sarel de Jong	2019 Worldcup Austrian Classics K-1, Semifinal	Innsbruck, Austria	Decision	3	2:00
Legend: Win Loss Draw/No contest Notes

== See also ==
- List of current UFC fighters
- List of female mixed martial artists
