= Felipe Lima =

Felipe Lima may refer to:

- Felipe Lima (swimmer) (born 1985), Brazilian swimmer
- Felipe Lima (footballer) (born 1989), Brazilian footballer
- Felipe Lima (fighter) (born 1998), Brazilian UFC fighter
