= Oktagon MMA =

MMA promotion based in Czech Republic and Slovakia

- Current season, competition or edition: 2026 in Oktagon MMA
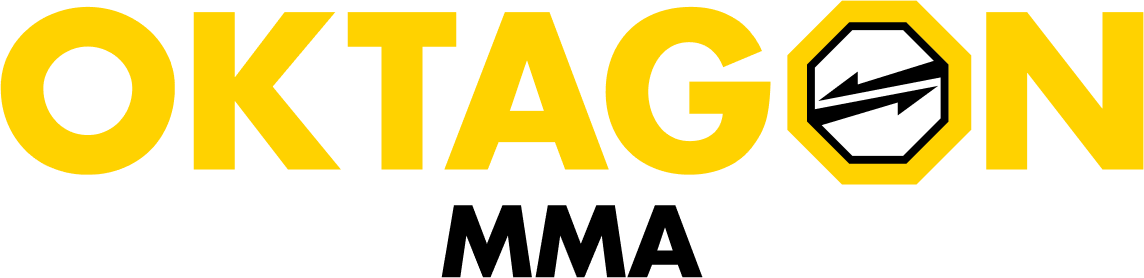
- Sport: Mixed martial arts promotion
- Founded: 22 June 2016; 10 years ago
- Founder: Pavol Neruda (formerly Šipkovský); Ondřej Novotný
- Owner: Private
- Country: Czech Republic; Slovakia
- Website: oktagonmma.com

Oktagon MMA is a mixed martial arts organization based in the Czech Republic and Slovakia, considered the largest Czech-Slovak organization. The founders and owners are Pavol Neruda (formerly Šipkovský) and Ondřej Novotný.

== History ==
The organization was founded in June 2016, when it came up with the reality show Oktagon Challenge. The project culminated in the Oktagon 1 tournament. Gábor Boráros and Jakub Běle faced each other in the final. The winner of the main match and the entire reality show was Gábor Boráros, and Oktagon started a series of gala evenings. The following 3 series brought several winners from Slovakia. Samuel Krištofič, Karol Ryšavý and Lucia Szabová completed the collection of champions. The final of the 5th series took place at the Oktagon 20 tournament, in which Roman Paulus won on points over Tomáš Zajac.

Oktagon organizes several tournaments every year in the largest Czech and Slovak arenas and cities as well as Germany and England. It created a reality show with professional fighters called Oktagon Challenge, Project X, which followed the journey of an ordinary person to the cage, Project Y - an all-female MMA reality show, and last but not least, a talk show about fighters and people from the Oktagon Majk scene. It also publishes the weekly Oktagon Magazín which maps the scene of combat sports. The organization now has more than 450,000 fans on social networks and YouTube, where their videos had over 46 million views in 2024.

== Rankings ==
The rankings for the Oktagon MMA's fighters are both recorded and updated when information has been obtained from the Oktagon's website.

- Updated as of June 20, 2026.

Oktagon Rankings
Rank	Pound for Pound	Heavyweight	Light Heavyweight	Middleweight	Welterweight	Lightweight
C	—N/a	(Republic of Ireland) Will Fleury	(Republic of Ireland) Will Fleury	(Turkey) Kerim Engizek (Uzbekistan) Makhmud Muradov (ic)	Vacant	(Poland) Mateusz Legierski
1	(Republic of Ireland) Will Fleury	(Bulgaria) Lazar Todev	(Germany) Alexander Poppeck	(Poland) Krzysztof Jotko	(Georgia (country)) Amiran Gogoladze	(Slovakia) Ivan Buchinger
2	(Slovakia) Lucia Szabová	(Turkey) Kasim Aras	(Czech Republic) Daniel Škvor	(Czech Republic) Patrik Kincl	(England) Jack Grant	(Turkey) Gökhan Aksu
3	(Kazakhstan) Zhalgas Zhumagulov	(Slovakia) Martin Buday	(Slovakia) Pavol Langer	(Czech Republic) Dominik Humburger	(Moldova) Ion Surdu	(Germany) Fedor Duric ▲1
4	(Brazil) Kaik Brito	(Poland) Adam Pałasz	(Germany) Emilio Quissua	(Iran) Hojat Khajevand	(Slovakia) Ronald Paradeiser	(Germany) Niko Samsonidse
5	(Austria) Mochamed Machaev	(Poland) Michał Piwowarski	(Germany) Frederic Vosgröne	(Poland) Piotr Wawrzyniak	(Germany) Jessin Ayari	(Germany) Ozan Aslaner
6	(Brazil) Igor Severino	(Italy) Simon Biyong	(Poland) Tomasz Narkun	(Slovakia) Matĕj Peňáz	(Germany) Felix Klinkhammer	(Germany) Arijan Topallaj ▲1
7	(Poland) Mateusz Legierski	(Germany) Patrick Vespaziani	(Czech Republic) Vojtĕch Garba	(Germany) Jamie Cordero ▼1	(Czech Republic) Andrej Kalašnik	(Namibia) Hafeni Nafuka ▲1
8	(Poland) Krzysztof Jotko	(Netherlands) Olutobi Ayodeji Kalejaiye	(Honduras) Jesus Samuel Chavarría	(Poland) Kamil Oniszczuk ▼1	(Germany) Marcel Mohamed Grabinski	(Germany) Konrad Dyrschka ▲1
9	(Turkey) Kerim Engizek	(Ukraine) Yevhenii Orlov	(Poland) Mateusz Strzelczyk	(England) Mick Stanton ▼1	(Germany) Christian Jungwirth	(Turkey) Attila Korkmaz ▼6
10	(Uzbekistan) Makhmud Muradov	(Germany) Nicolaj Wagner	(France) Jorick Montagnac	(Slovakia) Robert Pukač ▼1	(Germany) Christian Eckerlin	(Republic of Ireland) Denis Frimpong ▼4
Rank	Featherweight	Bantamweight	Flyweight	Women's Bantamweight	Women's Flyweight	
C	(Austria) Mochamed Machaev	(Brazil) Igor Severino	(Kazakhstan) Zhalgas Zhumagulov	(Slovakia) Lucia Szabová	(Slovakia) Lucia Szabová	
1	(Germany) Gjoni Palokaj	(Denmark) Jonas Mågård	(Georgia (country)) Beno Adamia	(Germany) Alina Dalaslan ▲1	(Slovakia) Veronika Smolková	
2	(Germany) Max Holzer	(Kazakhstan) Dastan Amangeldy	(Czech Republic) David Dvořák	(Czech Republic) Lucie Pudilová ▲1	(Brazil) Leidiane Fernandes	
3	(Germany) Zafar Mohsen ▲1	(Tajikistan) Khurshed Kakhorov	(Brazil) Matheus Severino ▲1	(Norway) Ivana Petrović ▲1	(Australia) Lisa Kyriacou	
4	(Czech Republic) Radek Roušal ▲2	(Azerbaijan) Raul Lemberanskij	(Iraq) Mohammed Walid ▲1	(Norway) Cecilie Bolander ▼3	(Brazil) Mileide Simplico ▼1	
5	(Germany) Khalid Taha ▲2	(Brazil) Wanderley Junior	(Wales) Aaron Aby ▲1	(England) Niamh Kinehan	(Spain) Aitana Álvarez ▼1	
6	(Republic of Ireland) Richie Smullen ▼1	(Brazil) Elvis Batista da Silva	(Germany) Shawn Marcos da Silva ▲1	(Poland) Karolina Sobek	(Poland) Marta Sós ▼1	
7	(Czech Republic) Jakub Batfalský ▲1	(Germany) Ali Gündüz	(Croatia) Stipe Brčić ▲1	(Brazil) Djulia Ariana	(Slovakia) Jovana Ðukić ▼1	
8	(England) James Hendin ▲1	(Slovakia) Roman Paulus	(United States) Christopher Daniel ▲1	(Switzerland) Stephanie Egger ▼1		
9	(Belgium) Ayton De Paepe ▲1	(Germany) Harun Kurt		(Germany) Katharina Lehner ▼1		
10	(Germany) Hugo Vach	(Germany) Abdullah Sultani		(Switzerland) Danielle Mistelli ▼1		

== List of Oktagon events ==
=== Scheduled events ===
Event	Date	Venue	Location	Ref.
Oktagon: Brno	Jun 19, 2027	Arena Brno	(Czech Republic) Brno, Czechia	
Oktagon 107: Infinity	May 15, 2027	Merkur Spiel-Arena	Düsseldorf, Germany	
Tipsport Cage Game 3	May 6, 2027	Zoner Bobyhall	(Czech Republic) Brno, Czechia	
Oktagon 106	May 1, 2027	Tipos Arena	Bratislava, Slovakia	
Oktagon 105	TBD, 2027	TBA	TBA	
Oktagon 104	Mar 6, 2027	Ostravar Arena	(Czech Republic) Ostrava, Czechia	
Oktagon 103	Feb 20, 2027	Wiener Stadthalle	Vienna, Austria	
Oktagon 102: Kincl vs. Humburger	Jan 30, 2027	Home Credit Arena	(Czech Republic) Liberec, Czechia	
Oktagon 101: Dalaslan vs. Kinehan	Jan 16, 2027	Hans-Martin-Schleyer-Halle	Stuttgart, Germany	
Oktagon 100: Jotko vs. Muradov	Dec 29, 2026	O2 Arena	(Czech Republic) Prague, Czechia	
Oktagon 99: Aras vs. Flores	Dec 5, 2026	Westfalenhalle	Dortmund, Germany	
Oktagon 98: Legierski vs. Buchinger	Nov 21, 2026	Werk Arena	(Czech Republic) Třinec, Czechia	

=== Past events ===
#	Event	Date	Venue	Location	Attendance	Ref.
114	Tipsport Cage Game 2	Nov 11, 2026	Zoner Bobyhall	(Czech Republic) Brno, Czechia	1,000	
113	Oktagon 97: Severino vs. Holzer	Nov 7, 2026	ZAG Arena	Hanover, Germany	11,000	
112	Oktagon 96: Gogoladze vs. Ayari	Oct 31, 2026	SAP Garden	Munich, Germany	11,000	
111	Oktagon 95: Škvor vs. Narkun	Oct 17, 2026	Mattoni Arena	(Czech Republic) Karlovy Vary, Czechia	7,000	
110	Oktagon 94: Eckerlin vs. Kozma	Sep 26, 2026	Deutsche Bank Park	Frankfurt am Main, Germany	50,000	
109	Oktagon 93: Roušal vs. Mågård	Sep 12, 2026	Winning Group Arena	(Czech Republic) Brno, Czechia	8,000	
108	Oktagon 92: Szabová vs. Pudilová	Aug 1, 2026	Centre Court, I. ČLTK Prague	(Czech Republic) Prague, Czechia	7,500	
107	Oktagon 91: Engizek vs. Jotko 2	Jul 11, 2026	Lanxess Arena	Cologne, Germany	19,500	
106	Tipsport Cage Game	Jun 24, 2026	X-Bionic Sphere	Šamorín, Slovakia		
105	Oktagon 90: Fleury vs. Aras	Jun 20, 2026	Uber Arena	Berlin, Germany	14,500	
104	Oktagon 89: Severino vs. Zhumagolov	Jun 6, 2026	Tipos Arena	Bratislava, Slovakia	9,000	
103	Oktagon 88: Holzer vs. Taha	May 16, 2026	ZAG Arena	Hanover, Germany	11,000	
102	Oktagon 87: Szabová vs. Fernandes	Apr 25, 2026	Home Credit Arena	(Czech Republic) Liberec, Czechia	8,000	
101	Oktagon 86: Materla vs. Jungwirth	Apr 11, 2026	Enea Arena	Szczecin, Poland	5,000	
100	Oktagon 85: Severino vs. Kakhorov	Mar 7, 2026	Barclays Arena	Hamburg, Germany	13,500	
99	Oktagon 84: Paradeiser vs. Brito	Feb 14, 2026	Ostravar Arena	(Czech Republic) Ostrava, Czechia	11,000	
98	Oktagon 83: Samsonidse vs. Machaev	Jan 31, 2026	Hans-Martin-Schleyer-Halle	Stuttgart, Germany	13,500	
97	Oktagon 82: Engizek vs. Jotko	Jan 17, 2026	PSD Bank Dome	Düsseldorf, Germany	15,500	
96	Oktagon 81: Fleury vs. Buday	Dec 29, 2025	O2 Arena	(Czech Republic) Prague, Czechia	18,000	
95	Oktagon 80: Legierski vs. Korkmaz	Nov 22, 2025	SAP Garden	Munich, Germany	11,500	
94	Oktagon 79: Surdu vs. Kalašnik	Nov 1, 2025	Winning Group Arena	(Czech Republic) Brno, Czechia	8,500	
93	Oktagon 78: Eckerlin vs. Trušček	Oct 18, 2025	Lanxess Arena	Cologne, Germany	19,500	
92	Oktagon 77: Engizek vs. Hamburger	Oct 4, 2025	Tipos Arena	Bratislava, Slovakia	8,500	
91	Oktagon 76: Weichel vs. Tounkara	Sep 20, 2025	Festhalle Frankfurt	Frankfurt am Main, Germany	10,000	
90	Oktagon 75: Palokaj vs. Batfalský	Sep 13, 2025	ZAG Arena	Hanover, Germany	11,000	
89	Oktagon 74: Bolander vs. Szabová	Aug 9, 2025	Centre Court, I. ČLTK Prague	(Czech Republic) Prague, Czechia	6,500	
88	Oktagon 73: Eckerlin vs. Pukač	Jun 28, 2025	Barclays Arena	Hamburg, Germany	14,000	
87	Oktagon 72: Vémola vs. Végh 3	Jun 14, 2025	Fortuna Arena	(Czech Republic) Prague, Czechia	25,417	
86	Oktagon 71: Poppeck vs. Langer	May 17, 2025	BMW Park	Munich, Germany	7,000	
85	Oktagon 70: Krištofič vs. Humburger	Apr 26, 2025	KV Arena	(Czech Republic) Karlovy Vary, Czechia	6,500	
84	Oktagon 69: Holzer vs. Ilbay	Apr 5, 2025	Westfalenhalle	Dortmund, Germany	15,000	
83	Oktagon 68: Todev vs. Fleury	Mar 8, 2025	Hans-Martin-Schleyer-Halle	Stuttgart, Germany	14,500	
82	Oktagon 67: Creasey vs. Adamia	Feb 22, 2025	Werk Arena	(Czech Republic) Třinec, Czechia	6,500	
81	Oktagon 66: Engizek vs. Salamone	Feb 1, 2025	PSD Bank Dome	Düsseldorf, Germany	15,000	
80	Oktagon 65: Paradeiser vs. Keita 2	Dec 29, 2024	O2 Arena	(Czech Republic) Prague, Czechia	18,000	
79	Oktagon 64: Brito vs. Surdu	Dec 7, 2024	SAP Garden	Munich, Germany	12,000	
78	Oktagon 63: Buchinger vs. Nafuka	Nov 9, 2024	Tipos Arena	Bratislava, Slovakia	9,000	
77	Oktagon 62: Eckerlin vs. Jungwirth	Oct 12, 2024	Deutsche Bank Park	Frankfurt am Main, Germany	59,148	
76	Oktagon 61: Paradeiser vs. Duque	Sep 21, 2024	Winning Group Arena	(Czech Republic) Brno, Czechia	8,500	
75	Oktagon 60: Buchinger vs. Eskiev	Sep 7, 2024	Rudolf Weber Arena	Oberhausen, Germany	10,000	
74	Oktagon 59: Paradeiser vs. Torres	Jul 20, 2024	Peugeot Arena	Bratislava, Slovakia	4,500	
73	Oktagon 58: Vémola vs. Végh 2	Jun 8, 2024	Fortuna Arena	(Czech Republic) Prague, Czechia	27,000	
72	Oktagon 57: Eckerlin vs. Brož	May 4, 2024	Festhalle Frankfurt	Frankfurt am Main, Germany	10,000	
71	Oktagon 56: Aby vs. Creasy	Apr 20, 2024	BP Pulse Live	(United Kingdom) Birmingham, England, UK	3,000	
70	Oktagon 55: Jungwirth vs. Pukač 2	Mar 23, 2024	Hanns-Martin-Schleyer-Halle	Stuttgart, Germany	15,000	
69	Oktagon 54: Kincl vs. Wawrzyniak	Mar 2, 2024	Ostravar Arena	(Czech Republic) Ostrava, Czechia	9,000	
68	Oktagon 53: Dalisda vs. Dourthe	Feb 10, 2024	Rudolf Weber Arena	Oberhausen, Germany	10,000	
67	Oktagon 52: Mågård vs. Cartwright	Jan 27, 2024	Utilita Arena	(United Kingdom) Newcastle upon Tyne, England, UK	3,000	
66	Oktagon 51: Veličković vs. Michaildis	Dec 29, 2023	O2 Arena	(Czech Republic) Prague, Czechia	17,000	
65	Oktagon 50: Keita vs. Samsonisde	Dec 9, 2023	Ostravar Arena	(Czech Republic) Ostrava, Czechia	9,000	
64	Oktagon 49: Moeil vs. Todev	Nov 18, 2023	Lanxess Arena	Cologne, Germany	19,000	
63	Oktagon 48: Aby vs. Garcia	Nov 4, 2023	AO Arena	(United Kingdom) Manchester, England, UK	4,500	
62	Oktagon 47: Vémola vs. Langer	Oct 7, 2023	Tipos Arena	Bratislava, Slovakia	9,000	
61	Oktagon 46: Dalisda vs. Austin	Sep 16, 2023	Festhalle Frankfurt	Frankfurt am Main, Germany	9,000	
60	Oktagon 45: Sanikidze vs. Keita	Jul 29, 2023	Centre Court, I. ČLTK Prague	(Czech Republic) Prague, Czechia	7,000	
59	Oktagon 45 Special: Mågård vs. Lima	Jul 28, 2023	Centre Court, I. ČLTK Prague	(Czech Republic) Prague, Czechia	6,000	
58	Oktagon 44: Langer vs. Poppeck	Jun 17, 2023	Rudolf Weber Arena	Oberhausen, Germany	10,000	
57	Oktagon 43: Kincl vs. Vémola 2	May 20, 2023	O2 Arena	(Czech Republic) Prague, Czechia	17,500	
56	Oktagon 42: Keita vs. Tichota	Apr 29, 2023	Tipos Arena	Bratislava, Slovakia	8,500	
55	Oktagon 41: Mågård vs. Lopez	Apr 15, 2023	Home Credit Arena	(Czech Republic) Liberec, Czechia	7,000	
54	Oktagon 40: Kozma vs. Siwiec	Mar 4, 2023	Ostravar Arena	(Czech Republic) Ostrava, Czechia	10,500	
53	Oktagon 39: Jungwirth vs. Neves	Feb 11, 2023	BMW Park	Munich, Germany	7,000	
52	Oktagon 38: Macek vs. Lopez	Dec 30, 2022	O2 Arena	(Czech Republic) Prague, Czechia	18,000	
51	Oktagon 37: Kozma vs. Brito	Dec 3, 2022	Ostravar Arena	(Czech Republic) Ostrava, Czechia	10,000	
50	Oktagon 36: Eckerlin vs. Neves 2	Oct 15, 2022	Festhalle Frankfurt	Frankfurt am Main, Germany	9,000	
49	Oktagon 35: Kincl vs. Lohoré	Sep 17, 2022	Winning Group Arena	(Czech Republic) Brno, Czechia	8,000	
48	Oktagon 34: Vémola vs. Ilič	Jul 23, 2022	Centre Court, I. ČLTK Prague	(Czech Republic) Prague, Czechia	7,000	
47	Oktagon 33: Buchinger vs. Keita	Jun 4, 2022	Festhalle Frankfurt	Frankfurt am Main, Germany	9,000	
46	Oktagon: Vémola vs. Marpo	May 21, 2022	O2 Arena	(Czech Republic) Prague, Czechia	18,000	
45	Oktagon 32: Kozma vs. Kníže	Apr 9, 2022	Ostravar Arena	(Czech Republic) Ostrava, Czechia	11,000	
44	Oktagon Prime 5: Kertész vs. Veličković	Mar 26, 2022	X-Bionic Sphere	Šamorín, Slovakia	3,500	
43	Oktagon 31: Krištofič vs. Kincl	Feb 26, 2022	O2 Arena	(Czech Republic) Prague, Czechia	10,000	
42	Oktagon 30: Peňáz vs. Kone	Dec 30, 2021	Zoner Bobyhall	(Czech Republic) Brno, Czechia	1,000	
41	Oktagon 29: Kozma vs. Veličković	Dec 4, 2021	Zoner Bobyhall	(Czech Republic) Brno, Czechia	1,000	
40	Oktagon Prime 4: Macek vs. Mågård	Nov 6, 2021	Enteria Arena	(Czech Republic) Pardubice, Czechia	5,000	
39	Oktagon 28: Pešta vs. Pütz	Sep 25, 2021	O2 Universum	(Czech Republic) Prague, Czechia	3,000	
38	Oktagon 27: Buchinger vs. Barborík	Sep 11, 2021	Tipos Arena	Bratislava, Slovakia	8,500	
37	Oktagon 26: Naruszczka vs. Krištofič	Jul 24, 2021	Centre Court, I. ČLTK Prague	(Czech Republic) Prague, Czechia	5,000	
36	Oktagon 25: Buday vs. Minda	Jun 19, 2021	Zoner Bobyhall	(Czech Republic) Brno, Czechia	0	
35	Oktagon 24: Kozma vs. Apollo	May 29, 2021	Zoner Bobyhall	(Czech Republic) Brno, Czechia	0	
34	Oktagon 23: Kníže vs. Fusi	May 1, 2021	Zoner Bobyhall	(Czech Republic) Brno, Czechia	0	
33	Oktagon 22: Vémola vs. Ďatelinka	Mar 27, 2021	Zoner Bobyhall	(Czech Republic) Brno, Czechia	0	
32	Underground: Last Man Standing	Feb 27, 2021	Zoner Bobyhall	(Czech Republic) Brno, Czechia	0	
31	Oktagon 21: Paradeiser vs. Buchinger	Jan 30, 2021	Zoner Bobyhall	(Czech Republic) Brno, Czechia	0	
30	Oktagon 20: Vémola vs. Lohoré	Dec 30, 2020	Zoner Bobyhall	(Czech Republic) Brno, Czechia	0	
29	Oktagon 19: Vémola vs. Mikulášek	Dec 5, 2020	Zoner Bobyhall	(Czech Republic) Brno, Czechia	0	
28	Oktagon 18: Wittner vs. Pukač	Nov 21, 2020	Zoner Bobyhall	(Czech Republic) Brno, Czechia	0	
27	Oktagon 17: Kozma vs. Kertész	Oct 17, 2020	Zoner Bobyhall	(Czech Republic) Brno, Czechia	0	
26	Oktagon 16: Ryšavý vs. Paradeiser	Sep 26, 2020	Zoner Bobyhall	(Czech Republic) Brno, Czechia	1,000	
25	Underground: Super Final	Jul 4, 2020	Zoner Bobyhall	(Czech Republic) Brno, Czechia	1,200	
24	Underground 6	Jun 20, 2020	OFA Kajot Gym	Bratislava, Slovakia	0	
23	Underground 5	Jun 13, 2020	Reinders MMA Gym	(Czech Republic) Prague, Czechia	0	
22	Underground 4	Jun 6, 2020	OFA Kajot Gym	Bratislava, Slovakia	0	
21	Underground 3	May 30, 2020	Reinders MMA Gym	(Czech Republic) Prague, Czechia	0	
20	Underground 2	May 23, 2020	OFA Kajot Gym	Bratislava, Slovakia	0	
19	Underground 1	May 16, 2020	Reinders MMA Gym	(Czech Republic) Prague, Czechia	0	
18	Oktagon Prime 3: Štrbák vs. Legierski	Feb 15, 2020	X-Bionic Sphere	Šamorín, Slovakia	3,200	
17	Oktagon 15: Végh vs. Vémola	Nov 9, 2019	O2 Arena	(Czech Republic) Prague, Czechia	19,500	
16	Oktagon Prime 2: Štrbák vs. Lima	Oct 25, 2019	Crow Arena	Košice, Slovakia	2,500	
15	Oktagon 14: Krištofič vs. Pukač	Sep 14, 2019	Tipos Arena	Bratislava, Slovakia	8,500	
14	Oktagon 13: Vémola vs. da Silva	Jul 27, 2019	Centre Court, I. ČLTK Prague	(Czech Republic) Prague, Czechia	7,000	
13	Oktagon 12: Végh vs. Zwicker	Jun 8, 2019	Tipos Arena	Bratislava, Slovakia	10,000	
12	Oktagon Prime 1: Wittner vs. Horváth	Apr 26, 2019	Crow Arena	Košice, Slovakia	2,000	
11	Oktagon 11: Kozma vs. Krištofič	Mar 16, 2019	Ostravar Arena	(Czech Republic) Ostrava, Czechia	10,500	
10	Oktagon 10: Deák vs. Golloway	Nov 17, 2018	O2 Arena	(Czech Republic) Prague, Czechia	10,500	
9	Oktagon 9: Krištofič vs. Siwy	Sep 15, 2018	Tipos Arena	Bratislava, Slovakia	8,000	
8	Oktagon 8: Ryšavý vs. Dauliatov	Jul 25, 2018	Hotel Imperial	(Czech Republic) Karlovy Vary, Czechia	200	
7	Oktagon 7: Martínek vs. Dittrich	Jul 28, 2018	Centre Court, I. ČLTK Prague	(Czech Republic) Prague, Czechia	7,000	
6	Oktagon 6: Krištofič vs. Raška	May 26, 2018	Steel Arena	Košice, Slovakia	3,000	
5	Oktagon 5: Kuzník vs. Klein	Mar 17, 2018	RT Torax Arena	(Czech Republic) Ostrava, Czechia	5,000	
4	Oktagon 4: Krištofič vs. Úškrt	Nov 12, 2017	Gopass Arena	Bratislava, Slovakia	4,500	
3	Oktagon 3: Végh vs. Byrne	Jul 29, 2017	Centre Court, I. ČLTK Prague	(Czech Republic) Prague, Czechia	2,500	
2	Oktagon 2: Boráros vs. Čambal	Apr 7, 2017	Gopass Arena	Bratislava, Slovakia	2,500	
1	Oktagon 1: Boráros vs. Běle	Dec 10, 2016	Královka Arena	(Czech Republic) Prague, Czechia	2,000	

=== Event locations ===
- The following cities have hosted a total of 104 events as of Oktagon 95 (October 17, 2026)

Czech Republic (total: 58)

- Prague (25)
  - O2 arena (9)
  - Centre Court, Štvanice (8)
  - Reinders MMA Gym (3)
  - Fortuna arena (2)
  - Královka arena (1)
  - O2 universum (1)
- Brno (18)
- Ostrava (8)
- Karlovy Vary (3)
- Liberec (2)
- Pardubice (1)
- Třinec (1)

Germany (total: 28)

- Frankfurt (7)
- Munich (4)
- Oberhausen (3)
- Stuttgart (3)
- Cologne (3)
- Düsseldorf (2)
- Hamburg (2)
- Hanover (2)
- Dortmund (1)
- Berlin (1)

Slovakia (total: 20)

- Bratislava (15)
- Košice (3)
- Šamorín (2)

United Kingdom (total: 3)

- Manchester, England (1)
- Newcastle, England (1)
- Birmingham, England (1)

Poland (total: 1)

- Szczecin (1)

== Current champions ==
=== Men's divisions ===
Division	Upper weight limit	Champion	Since	Title defenses
Heavyweight	120 kg (264.6 lb; 18.9 st)	(Republic of Ireland) Will Fleury	Mar 8, 2025	2
Light Heavyweight	93 kg (205.0 lb; 14.6 st)	(Uzbekistan) Makhmud Muradov	August 1, 2026	0
Middleweight	84 kg (185.2 lb; 13.2 st)	(Poland) Krzysztof Jotko	Jul 11, 2026	0
Middleweight	84 kg (185.2 lb; 13.2 st)	(Uzbekistan) Makhmud Muradov (interim)	Jun 14, 2025	0
Welterweight	77 kg (169.8 lb; 12.1 st)	(Georgia (country)) Amiran Gogoladze	Oct 31, 2026	0
Lightweight	71 kg (156.5 lb; 11.2 st)	(Poland) Mateusz Legierski	Nov 20, 2025	1
Featherweight	66 kg (145.5 lb; 10.4 st)	Vacant	Jul 10, 2026	
Bantamweight	61 kg (134.5 lb; 9.6 st)	(Brazil) Igor Severino	Mar 7, 2026	0
Flyweight	57 kg (125.7 lb; 9.0 st)	(Kazakhstan) Zhalgas Zhumagulov	Jun 28, 2025	1

=== Women's divisions ===
Division	Upper weight limit	Champion	Since	Title defenses
Bantamweight	61 kg (134.5 lb; 9.6 st)	Vacant	August 25, 2026	
Flyweight	57 kg (125.7 lb; 9.0 st)	Vacant	August 25, 2026	
Strawweight	53 kg (116.8 lb; 8.3 st)	(United States) Mallory Martin	Oct 12, 2024	(division has been terminated)

== Championship history ==
=== Heavyweight championship ===
120 kg (264.6 lb; 18.9 st)

No.	Name	Event	Date	Reign (total)	Defenses
1	(Czech Republic) Michal Martínek def. Daniel Dittrich	Oktagon 7 Prague, Czech Republic	Jul 28, 2018	768 days	1. def. Viktor Pešta at Oktagon 15 on Nov 29, 2019
Martínek vacated the title on September 3, 2020, when he signed with Absolute Championship Akhmat.
2	(Slovakia) Martin Buday def. Kamil Minda	Oktagon 25; Brno, Czech Republic	Jun 19, 2021	115 days	
Buday vacated the title on October 12, 2021, when he signed with Ultimate Fighting Championship.
3	(Germany) Hatef Moeil def. Lazar Todev	Oktagon 49; Cologne, Germany	Nov 18, 2023	395 days	
Moeil was stripped of the title and released by promotion on December 17, 2024, due to various incidents.
4	(Republic of Ireland) Will Fleury def. Lazar Todev	Oktagon 68; Frankfurt, Germany	Mar 8, 2025	623 days (incumbent)	1. def. Martin Buday at Oktagon 81 on Dec 28, 2025; 2. def. Kasim Aras at Oktagon 90 on Jun 20, 2026

=== Light heavyweight championship ===
93 kg (205.0 lb; 14.6 st)

No.	Name	Event	Date	Reign (total)	Defenses
1	(Czech Republic) Viktor Pešta def. Stephan Pütz	Oktagon 28; Prague, Czech Republic	Sep 25, 2021	178 days	
Pešta vacated the title on March 22, 2022, when he signed with Professional Fighters League.
2	(Czech Republic) Karlos Vémola def. Aleksandar Ilić	Oktagon 34; Prague, Czech Republic	Jul 23, 2022	890 days	1. def. interim champion Pavol Langer at Oktagon 47 on Oct 7, 2023; 2. def. Attila Végh at Oktagon 58 on Jun 8, 2024
–	(Slovakia) Pavol Langer def. Alexander Poppeck for interim title	Oktagon 44; Oberhausen, Germany	Jun 17, 2023	–	
3	(Republic of Ireland) Will Fleury	Oktagon 65; Prague, Czech Republic	Dec 29, 2024	692 days	
4	(Uzbekistan) Makhmud Muradov	Oktagon 92; Prague, Czech Republic	Aug 1, 2026	112 days (incumbent)	

=== Middleweight championship ===
84 kg (185.2 lb; 13.2 st)

No.	Name	Event	Date	Reign (total)	Defenses
1	(Czech Republic) Karlos Vémola def. Alex Lohoré	Oktagon 20; Brno, Czech Republic	Dec 30, 2020	86 days	
Vémola was stripped of the title on March 26, 2021, after failing to make weight for his title defense against Milan Ďatelinka at Oktagon 22.
–	(Slovakia) Samuel Kristofič def. Marcin Naruszczka for interim title	Oktagon 26; Prague, Czech Republic	Jul 24, 2021	–	
2	(Czech Republic) Patrik Kincl def. Samuel Kristofič	Oktagon 31; Prague, Czech Republic	Feb 26, 2022	957 days	1. def. Alex Lohoré at Oktagon 35 on Sep 17, 2022; 2. def. Karlos Vémola at Oktagon 43 on May 20, 2023; 3. def. interim champion Piotr Wawrzyniak at Oktagon 54 on Mar 2, 2024
–	(Poland) Piotr Wawrzyniak def. Vlasto Čepo for interim title	Oktagon 51; Prague, Czech Republic	Dec 29, 2023	–	
3	(Turkey) Kerim Engizek	Oktagon 62; Frankfurt, Germany	Oct 10, 2024	639 days	
–	(Uzbekistan) Makhmud Muradov def. Patrik Kincl for interim title	Oktagon 72; Prague, Czech Republic	Jun 14, 2025	525 days (incumbent)	
4	(Poland) Krzysztof Jotko	Oktagon 91; Cologne, Germany	Jul 11, 2026	133 days (incumbent)	

=== Welterweight championship ===
77 kg (169.8 lb; 12.1 st)

No.	Name	Event	Date	Reign (total)	Defenses
1	(Czech Republic) David Kozma def. Gábor Boráros	Oktagon 10; Prague, Czech Republic	Nov 17, 2018	1477 days	1. def. Samuel Krištofič at Oktagon 11 on Mar 16, 2019; 2. def. Maté Kertész at Oktagon 17 on Oct 17, 2020; 3. def. Leandro Silva at Oktagon 24 on May 29, 2021; 4. def. Bojan Veličković at Oktagon 29 on Dec 4, 2021; 5. def. Petr Kníže at Oktagon 32 on Apr 9, 2022
2	(Brazil) Kaik Brito	Oktagon 37; Ostrava, Czech Republic	Dec 3, 2022	173 days	
Brito vacated the title on May 25, 2023, when he completed to participate in the Dana White's Contender Series.
3	(Moldova) Ion Surdu def. Kaik Brito	Oktagon 64; Munich, Germany	Dec 7, 2024	321 days	
Surdu was stripped of the title on October 31, 2025, after failing to make weight for his title defense against Andrej Kalašnik at Oktagon 79.
4	(Brazil) Kaik Brito (2) def. Ronald Paradeiser	Oktagon 84; Ostrava, Czech Republic	Feb 14, 2026	139 days	
Brito vacated the title on July 3, 2026 to compete at Dana White's Contender Series.
5	(Georgia (country)) Amiran Gogoladze def. Jessin Ayari	Oktagon 96; Munich, Germany	Oct 31, 2026	21 days (incumbent)	

=== Lightweight championship ===
71 kg (156.5 lb; 11.2 st)

No.	Name	Event	Date	Reign (total)	Defenses
1	(Poland) Mateusz Legierski def. Miroslav Štrbák	Oktagon Prime 3 Šamorín, Slovakia	Feb 15, 2020	100 days	
Legierski vacated the title on May 25, 2020, when he signed with Konfrontacja Sztuk Walki.
2	(Slovakia) Ivan Buchinger def. Ronald Paradeiser	Oktagon 21; Brno, Czech Republic	Jan 30, 2021	490 days	
–	(Belgium) Losene Keita def. Ronald Paradeiser for interim title	Oktagon 31; Prague, Czech Republic	Feb 26, 2022	–	
3	(Belgium) Losene Keita	Oktagon 33; Frankfurt, Germany	Jun 4, 2022	501 days	
Keita has officially vacated the title on October 18, 2023, after he moving down to featherweight and challenge to title.
4	(Slovakia) Ronald Paradeiser def. Ivan Buchinger	Oktagon 50; Ostrava, Czech Republic	Dec 9, 2023	386 days	
5	(Belgium) Losene Keita (2)	Oktagon 65; Prague, Czech Republic	Dec 29, 2024	229 days	
Keita vacated the title on August 15, 2025, when he signed with the Ultimate Fighting Championship.
6	(Poland) Mateusz Legierski (2) def. Attila Korkmaz	Oktagon 80; Munich, Germany	Nov 22, 2025	364 days (incumbent)	1. def. Gökhan Aksu at Oktagon 90 on Jun 20, 2026

=== Featherweight championship ===
66 kg (145.5 lb; 10.4 st)

No.	Name	Event	Date	Reign (total)	Defenses
1	(Slovakia) Ivan Buchinger def. Vojto Barborík	Oktagon 27; Bratislava, Slovakia	Nov 9, 2021	317 days	
Buchinger has officially vacated the title on September 22, 2022, due to injury.
2	(Georgia (country)) Mate Sanikidze def. Jakub Tichota	Oktagon 37; Ostrava, Czech Republic	Dec 3, 2022	238 days	1. def. interim champion Losene Keita at Oktagon 45 on Jul 29, 2023
–	(Belgium) Losene Keita def. Jakub Tichota for interim title	Oktagon 42; Bratislava, Slovakia	Apr 29, 2023	–	
Sanikidze vacated the title on October 11, 2023, after he moved down to Bantamweight division.
3	(Belgium) Losene Keita def. Niko Samsonidse	Oktagon 50; Ostrava, Czech Republic	Dec 9, 2023	615 days	
Keita vacated the title on August 15, 2025, when he signed with the Ultimate Fighting Championship.
4	(Austria) Mochamed Machaev def. Niko Samsonidse	Oktagon 83; Stuttgart, Germany	Jan 31, 2026	160 days	
Machaev was stripped of the title on July 10, 2026, after failing to make weight for his title defense against Gjoni Palokaj at Oktagon 91.

=== Bantamweight championship ===
61 kg (134.5 lb; 9.6 st)

No.	Name	Event	Date	Reign (total)	Defenses
1	(Slovakia) Tomáš Deák def. Filip Macek	Oktagon 14; Bratislava, Slovakia	Sep 14, 2019	391 days	
Deák vacated the title on October 9, 2020, when he signed with Absolute Championship Akhmat.
2	(Denmark) Jonas Mågård def. Filip Macek	Oktagon Prime 4 Pardubice, Czech Republic	Nov 6, 2021	265 days	1. def. interim champion Gustavo Lopez at Oktagon 41 on Apr 15, 2023
–	(United States) Gustavo Lopez def. Filip Macek for interim title	Oktagon 38; Prague, Czech Republic	Dec 30, 2022	–	
3	(Brazil) Felipe Lima	Oktagon 45; Prague, Czech Republic	Jul 29, 2023	364 days	
Lima vacated the title on June 17, 2024, when he signed with the Ultimate Fighting Championship.
4	(Brazil) Igor Severino def. Khurshed Kakhorov	Oktagon 85; Hamburg, Germany	Mar 7, 2026	259 days (incumbent)	NC. vs. Zhalgas Zhumagulov at Oktagon 89 on Jun 6, 2026; 1. def. Max Holzer at Oktagon 97 on Nov 7, 2026

=== Flyweight championship ===
57 kg (125.7 lb; 9.0 st)

No.	Name	Event	Date	Reign (total)	Defenses
1	(United States) Elias Garcia def. Aaron Aby	Oktagon 48; Manchester, England	Nov 4, 2023	138 days	
Garcia was stripped of the title on March 21, 2024, due to repeatedly refusing to fight.
2	(England) Sam Creasey def. Aaron Aby	Oktagon 56; Birmingham, England	Apr 20, 2024	308 days	
3	(Georgia (country)) Beno Adamia	Oktagon 67; Třinec, Czech Republic	Feb 22, 2025	125 days	
Adamia was stripped of the title on June 27, 2025, after failing to make weight for his title defense against Zhalgas Zhumagulov at Oktagon 73.
4	(Kazakhstan) Zhalgas Zhumagulov def. Beno Adamia	Oktagon 73; Hamburg, Germany	Jun 28, 2025	511 days (incumbent)	1. def. David Dvořák at Oktagon 81 on Dec 28, 2025

=== Women's bantamweight championship ===
61 kg (134.5 lb; 9.6 st)

No.	Name	Event	Date	Reign (total)	Defenses
1	(Norway) Cecilie Bolander def. Lucie Pudilová	Oktagon 65; Prague, Czech Republic	Dec 29, 2024	223 days	
2	(Slovakia) Lucia Szabová	Oktagon 74; Prague, Czech Republic	Aug 9, 2025	381 days	1. def. Lucie Pudilová at Oktagon 92 on Aug 01, 2026
Szabová vacated the title on August 25, 2026, when she signed with the Ultimate Fighting Championship.

=== Women's flyweight championship ===
57 kg (125.7 lb; 9.0 st)

No.	Name	Event	Date	Reign (total)	Defenses
1	(Czech Republic) Tereza Bledá def. Mabelly Lima	Oktagon 30; Brno, Czech Republic	Dec 30, 2021	306 days	
Bledá vacated the title on October 11, 2022, when she signed with the Ultimate Fighting Championship.
2	(Slovakia) Lucia Szabová def. Leidiane Fernandes	Oktagon 87; Liberec, Czech Republic	Apr 25, 2026	122 days	
Szabová vacated the title on August 25, 2026, when she signed with the Ultimate Fighting Championship.

=== Women's strawweight championship ===
53 kg (116.8 lb; 8.3 st)

No.	Name	Event	Date	Reign (total)	Defenses
1	(Germany) Katharina Dalisda def. Jacinta Austin	Oktagon 46; Frankfurt, Germany	Sep 16, 2023	390 days	1. def. Eva Dourthe at Oktagon 53 on Feb 11, 2024
2	(United States) Mallory Martin	Oktagon 62; Frankfurt, Germany	Oct 10, 2024	772 days (incumbent)	1. def. Eva Dourthe at Oktagon 70 on Apr 26, 2025

== Tournament winners ==
Event	Date	Division	Winner	Runner-up
Oktagon 51	Dec 29, 2023	Welterweight	(Serbia) Bojan Veličković	(Greece) Andreas Michailidis
Oktagon 65	Dec 29, 2024	Lightweight	(Belgium) Losene Keita	(Slovakia) Ronald Paradeiser
Oktagon 82	Jan 17, 2026	Middleweight	(Poland) Krzysztof Jotko	(Turkey) Kerim Engizek
