= UFC Fight Night: Bonfim vs. Brown =

Mixed martial arts event in 2025

- The poster for UFC Fight Night: Bonfim vs. Brown
- Promotion: Ultimate Fighting Championship
- Date: November 8, 2025
- Venue: UFC Apex
- City: Enterprise, Nevada, United States
- Attendance: Not announced

Event chronology
UFC Fight Night: Garcia vs. Onama	UFC Fight Night: Bonfim vs. Brown	UFC 322: Della Maddalena vs. Makhachev

UFC Fight Night: Bonfim vs. Brown (also known as UFC Fight Night 264, UFC Vegas 111 and UFC on ESPN+ 122) was a mixed martial arts event produced by the Ultimate Fighting Championship that took place on November 8, 2025, at the UFC Apex in Enterprise, Nevada, part of the Las Vegas Valley, United States.

== Background ==
A welterweight bout between former LFA Welterweight Champion Gabriel Bonfim and Randy Brown headlined the event. They were originally scheduled to compete at UFC Fight Night: Oliveira vs. Gamrot one month before, but the bout was moved to this event in order to serve as the main event.

Austin Bashi was expected to face Jamall Emmers in a featherweight bout at the event. However, Bashi pulled out due to an injury and was replaced by Hyder Amil.

A women's bantamweight bout between Luana Santos and Dariya Zheleznyakova was scheduled for this event. However, Zheleznyakova withdrew from the fight for unknown reasons and was replaced by Melissa Croden. The rescheduled bout between Santos and Croden was later moved to UFC on ESPN: Royval vs. Kape in December.

A bantamweight bout between former LFA Bantamweight Champion Miles Johns and Daniel Marcos took place at this event. Johns was initially booked to face fellow former LFA champion Muin Gafurov one week prior at UFC Fight Night: Garcia vs. Onama, but Gafurov withdrew for undisclosed reasons. Meanwhile, Marcos was slated to fight Felipe Lima at UFC Fight Night: Tsarukyan vs. Hooker on November 22, until Lima also withdrew. Following both cancellations, Johns and Marcos were rebooked to face each other at this event.

A bantamweight bout between Adrian Yañez and Cristian Quiñónez was scheduled for this event. However during fight week, Quiñónez withdrew from the bout for unknown reasons and the bout was subsequently cancelled.

In addition, Robert Valentin withdrew from his middleweight bout against Jackson McVey due to a back injury. Undefeated prospect Donte Johnson was initially considered as a replacement, having competed a week earlier at UFC Fight Night: Garcia vs. Onama, in a 190-pound catchweight bout. However, the Nevada State Athletic Commission declined the substitution because Johnson was under a two-week medical suspension. As a result, Zachary Reese stepped in to face McVey in a catchweight bout at 195 pounds.

At the weigh-ins, Ismael Bonfim weighed in at 161 pounds, five pounds over the lightweight non-title fight limit. The bout proceeded at catchweight and he was fined 25 percent of his purse, which went to his opponent Chris Padilla.

== Results ==
Main card (ESPN+)
Weight class				Method	Round	Time	Notes
Welterweight	Gabriel Bonfim	def.	Randy Brown	TKO (knee)	2	1:40
Flyweight	Joseph Morales	def.	Matt Schnell	Submission (guillotine choke)	1	2:54
Welterweight	Uroš Medić	def.	Muslim Salikhov	TKO (punches)	1	1:03
Catchweight (161 lb)	Chris Padilla	def.	Ismael Bonfim	TKO (punches)	2	4:30
Middleweight	Christian Leroy Duncan	def.	Marco Tulio	KO (spinning backfist and punches)	2	3:20
Preliminary card (ESPN+)
Featherweight	Jamall Emmers	def.	Hyder Amil	Decision (unanimous) (29–27, 30–27, 30–27)	3	5:00
Bantamweight	Raoni Barcelos	def.	Ricky Simón	Decision (unanimous) (29–28, 29–28, 29–28)	3	5:00
Women's Bantamweight	Jacqueline Cavalcanti	def.	Mayra Bueno Silva	Decision (unanimous) (30–27, 30–27, 29–28)	3	5:00
Heavyweight	Josh Hokit	def.	Max Gimenis	TKO (punches)	1	0:56
Women's Strawweight	Denise Gomes	def.	Tecia Pennington	Decision (unanimous) (30–27, 30–27, 30–27)	3	5:00
Bantamweight	Daniel Marcos	def.	Miles Johns	Technical Submission (rear-naked choke)	2	4:23
Catchweight (195 lb)	Zachary Reese	def.	Jackson McVey	Submission (rear-naked choke)	2	1:38

== Bonus awards ==
The following fighters received $50,000 bonuses.

- Fight of the Night: No bonus awarded.
- Performance of the Night: Gabriel Bonfim, Christian Leroy Duncan, Josh Hokit, and Zachary Reese

== See also ==
- 2025 in UFC
- List of current UFC fighters
- List of UFC events
