= Vinicius Oliveira =

Brazilian mixed martial artist and rapper

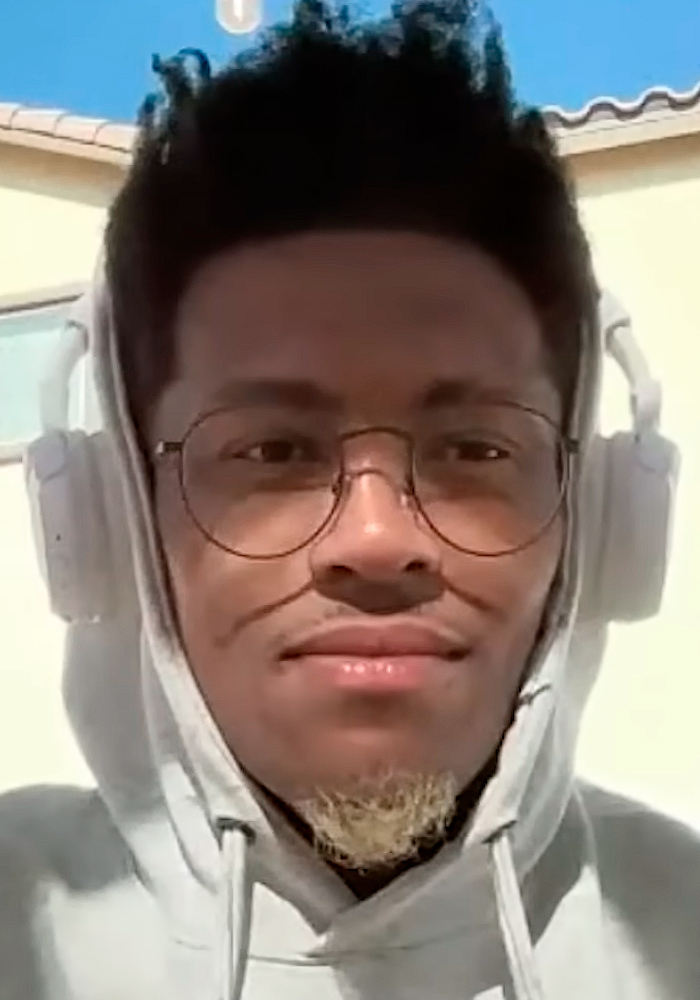
- Vinicius Oliveira in 2026
- Born: Vinicius de Oliveira Prestes de Matos; November 30, 1995 (age 30); Porto Alegre, Rio Grande do Sul, Brazil
- Other names: Lok Dog
- Height: 5 ft 9 in (1.75 m)
- Division: Flyweight (2016, 2019); Bantamweight (2015, 2017–2026); Featherweight (2026–present)
- Fighting out of: Porto Alegre, Rio Grande do Sul, Brazil
- Team: Sombra Team MMA
- Years active: 2017–present

Mixed martial arts record
- Total: 28
- Wins: 24
- By knockout: 17
- By submission: 2
- By decision: 5
- Losses: 4
- By knockout: 3
- By submission: 1
- By decision: 0
- No contests: 0

Other information
- Mixed martial arts record from Sherdog

Vinicius de Oliveira Prestes de Matos (born November 30, 1995), also known as Vinicius LokDog, is a Brazilian professional mixed martial artist and rapper currently competing in the featherweight division of the Ultimate Fighting Championship (UFC).

== Early life and background ==
Oliveira was born in Porto Alegre, in the southern Brazilian state of Rio Grande do Sul. He began training in combat sports at a young age, developing a strong foundation in Brazilian jiu-jitsu and striking. He turned professional in 2017 and quickly gained regional acclaim on the Brazilian scene. Oliveira later competed for UAE Warriors and other international promotions before being invited to Dana White's Contender Series in 2023.

== Mixed martial arts career ==
=== Dana White's Contender Series ===
On September 26, 2023, Oliveira faced Victor Madrigal during Dana White's Contender Series and won via knockout in the first round, earning a UFC contract.

=== Ultimate Fighting Championship ===
Oliveira made his promotional debut on March 2, 2024, at UFC Fight Night 238, where he defeated Bernardo Sopaj by third-round flying knee knockout. The bout earned both the Performance of the Night and Fight of the Night bonuses.

He next fought Ricky Simón at UFC 303 on June 29, 2024, at the T-Mobile Arena in Las Vegas, winning via unanimous decision.

On February 1, 2025, he defeated Said Nurmagomedov via unanimous decision at UFC Fight Night 250, held in Riyadh, Saudi Arabia. This fight earned him another Fight of the Night award.

Oliveira faced Kyler Phillips at UFC 318 on July 19, 2025. He won the fight by unanimous decision.

Oliveira faced Mario Bautista on February 7, 2026 in the main event at UFC Fight Night 266. He lost the fight via a rear-naked choke submission at the end of the second round.

Moving up to featherweight, Oliveira was scheduled to face Giga Chikadze on June 20, 2026, at UFC Fight Night 279. However, Chikadze had to withdraw for undisclosed reasons and was replaced by Andre Fili. Oliveira won the fight by technical knockout in the second round. This fight earned him a $100,000 Fight of the Night award.

Oliveira is scheduled to face Pat Sabatini on January 23, 2027 at UFC Fight Night 297.

== Championships and accomplishments ==
=== Mixed martial arts ===
- Ultimate Fighting Championship
  - Fight of the Night (Three times) vs. Bernardo Sopaj, Said Nurmagomedov and Andre Fili
  - Performance of the Night (One time) vs. Bernardo Sopaj

== Mixed martial arts record ==
Professional record breakdown
28 matches	24 wins	4 losses
By knockout	17	3
By submission	2	1
By decision	5	0

Res.	Record	Opponent	Method	Event	Date	Round	Time	Location	Notes
Win	24–4	Andre Fili	TKO (punches and elbows)	UFC Fight Night: Kape vs. Horiguchi	June 20, 2026	2	4:56	Las Vegas, Nevada, United States	Featherweight debut. Fight of the Night.
Loss	23–4	Mario Bautista	Submission (rear-naked choke)	UFC Fight Night: Bautista vs. Oliveira	February 7, 2026	2	4:46	Las Vegas, Nevada, United States	
Win	23–3	Kyler Phillips	Decision (unanimous)	UFC 318	July 19, 2025	3	5:00	New Orleans, Louisiana, United States	
Win	22–3	Said Nurmagomedov	Decision (unanimous)	UFC Fight Night: Adesanya vs. Imavov	February 1, 2025	3	5:00	Riyadh, Saudi Arabia	Fight of the Night.
Win	21–3	Ricky Simón	Decision (unanimous)	UFC 303	June 29, 2024	3	5:00	Las Vegas, Nevada, United States	
Win	20–3	Benardo Sopaj	KO (flying knee)	UFC Fight Night: Rozenstruik vs. Gaziev	March 2, 2024	3	4:41	Las Vegas, Nevada, United States	Performance of the Night. Fight of the Night.
Win	19–3	Victor Madrigal	KO (punch)	Dana White's Contender Series 64	September 26, 2023	1	3:02	Las Vegas, Nevada, United States	
Win	18–3	Hikaru Yoshino	TKO (punches)	UAE Warriors 39	March 18, 2023	1	4:02	Abu Dhabi, United Arab Emirates	
Loss	17–3	Ali Taleb	KO (punches)	UAE Warriors 30	July 2, 2022	3	2:30	Abu Dhabi, United Arab Emirates	Lost the UAE Warriors Bantamweight Championship.
Win	17–2	Sylvester Chipfumbu	Submission (rear-naked choke)	UAE Warriors 24	October 29, 2021	1	3:13	Abu Dhabi, United Arab Emirates	Defended the UAE Warriors Bantamweight Championship.
Win	16–2	Xavier Alaoui	TKO (head kick and punches)	UAE Warriors 18	March 20, 2021	2	3:42	Abu Dhabi, United Arab Emirates	Won the UAE Warriors Bantamweight Championship.
Win	15–2	Sultan Zholdoshbek	Decision (unanimous)	UAE Warriors 15	January 15, 2021	3	5:00	Abu Dhabi, United Arab Emirates	
Win	14–2	Furkatbek Yokubov	TKO (punches)	UAE Warriors 14	November 27, 2020	1	2:11	Abu Dhabi, United Arab Emirates	
Win	13–2	Caionã Batista	Decision (unanimous)	Future FC 10	December 6, 2019	3	5:00	São Paulo, Brazil	
Win	12–2	Leosvaldo Alves dos Santos	TKO (punches)	Future FC 6	June 28, 2019	2	2:01	São Paulo, Brazil	
Loss	11–2	Adriano Ramos	KO (punch)	Future FC 1	January 25, 2019	1	1:36	Indaiatuba, Brazil	Flyweight bout.
Win	11–1	Rubem Barca de Souza	TKO (punches)	New Corpore Extreme 32	December 8, 2018	2	2:30	Rio de Janeiro, Brazil	
Loss	10–1	Cristian Quiñónez	TKO (doctor stoppage)	Combate Americas 23	May 18, 2018	2	0:44	Tijuana, Mexico	
Win	10–0	Leonilson Azevedo	TKO (punches)	Circuito World Combat 4	December 16, 2017	1	1:58	Alvorada, Brazil	
Win	9–0	Luiz Fernando Correa	TKO (punches)	Taura MMA 1	September 16, 2017	1	2:42	Viamão, Brazil	
Win	8–0	Amauri Carpes	TKO (punches)	Major Fight Night	August 5, 2017	1	2:40	Taquari, Brazil	
Win	7–0	Junior Cesar	TKO (punches)	Circuito Team Nogueira Viamão 1	June 24, 2017	1	1:57	Viamão, Brazil	
Win	6–0	Thiago dos Santos Ebertz	TKO (punches)	JVT Championship 12	May 20, 2017	1	1:57	Caxias do Sul, Brazil	
Win	5–0	Guilherme Paes Ferreira	TKO (punches)	Copa do Brasil	February 18, 2017	1	1:14	Barracão, Brazil	
Win	4–0	Ulisses Cesar Neto Barcelos	TKO (punches)	Beach Fight Quintao	January 14, 2017	1	2:50	Palmares do Sul, Brazil	Return to Bantamweight.
Win	3–0	Michael Teixeira	TKO (punches)	Warriors Fighters: 2nd Edition	November 12, 2016	1	1:19	Santo Ângelo, Brazil	
Win	2–0	Aleczander Castilhos	Submission (guillotine choke)	X-Fest MMA 9	June 11, 2016	1	4:22	Porto Alegre, Brazil	Flyweight debut.
Win	1–0	Michael Teixeira	KO (punch)	Brothers Fighting 2	December 19, 2015	1	2:00	Porto Alegre, Brazil	Bantamweight debut.

== See also ==
- List of current UFC fighters
- List of Dana White's Contender Series alumni
- List of male mixed martial artists
