= Dana White's Contender Series season 7 =

UFC mixed martial arts event in 2023

Dana White's Contender Series
- Season 7

Release
- Original network: ESPN+
- Original release: August 8 – October 10, 2023

Season chronology
- ← Previous; Season 6 Next → Season 8

Season 7 of Dana White's Contender Series commences in August 2023 and in the US is exclusive to ESPN+, ESPN's new over-the-top subscription package.

== Week 1 – August 8 ==
=== Background ===
Joshua Van was expected to face Kevin Borjas in a flyweight bout at the event, but he was pulled in order to face Zhalgas Zhumagulov at UFC on ABC: Emmett vs. Topuria. He was replaced by Rickson Zenidim. However, Zenidim had visa issues and was replaced by Victor Dias.

Dana White's Contender Series 57
- Promotion: DWCS
- Date: August 8, 2023
- Venue: UFC Apex Centre
- City: Las Vegas, Nevada, United States

Main Card
Weight class				Method	Round	Time	Notes
Middleweight	César Almeida	def.	Lucas Fernando	Decision (unanimous) (30–26, 29–28, 29–27)	3	5:00
Lightweight	Tom Nolan	def.	Bogdan Grad	KO (punches)	1	1:23
Heavyweight	Caio Machado	def.	Kevin Szaflarski	Decision (unanimous) (30–27, 30–27, 30–27)	3	5:00
Bantamweight	Payton Talbott	def.	Reyes Cortez	Decision (unanimous) (29–28, 29–28, 29–28)	3	5:00
Flyweight	Kevin Borjas	def.	Victor Dias	Decision (unanimous) (29–28, 29–28, 29–28)	3	5:00

=== Contract awards ===
The following fighters (all winners of the night) were awarded contracts with the UFC:

- Kevin Borjas, Payton Talbott, Caio Machado, Tom Nolan, and César Almeida

== Week 2 – August 15 ==
Dana White's Contender Series 58
- Promotion: DWCS
- Date: August 15, 2023
- Venue: UFC Apex Centre
- City: Las Vegas, Nevada, United States

Main Card
Weight class				Method	Round	Time	Notes
Lightweight	Abdul-Kerim Al-Selwady	def.	George Hardwick	Decision (unanimous) (30–27, 30–27, 30–27)	3	5:00
Light Heavyweight	Ibo Aslan	def.	Paulo Renato Jr.	TKO (punches)	1	2:22
Featherweight	Hyder Amil	def.	Emrah Sonmez	Decision (unanimous) (29–28, 29–28, 29–28)	3	5:00	(Note: Sonmez missed weight (147 lbs))
Women's Strawweight	Eduarda Moura	def.	Janaína Silva	Submission (rear-naked choke)	1	4:00
Bantamweight	Charalampos Grigoriou	def.	Cameron Smotherman	TKO (punches)	1	1:00

=== Contract awards ===
The following fighters (all winners of the night) were awarded contracts with the UFC:

- Charalampos Grigoriou, Eduarda Moura, Hyder Amil, Ibo Aslan, and Abdul-Kerim Al-Selwady

== Week 3 – August 22 ==
=== Background ===
Edgar Chairez was expected to face Felipe dos Santos in a flyweight bout at the event, but he was pulled in order to face Tatsuro Taira at UFC 290. He was briefly replaced by Luciano Pereira. At the weigh-ins, Pereira did not step onto the scale due to a medical issue and the bout was scrapped entirely.

Dana White's Contender Series 59
- Promotion: DWCS
- Date: August 22, 2023
- Venue: UFC Apex Centre
- City: Las Vegas, Nevada, United States

Main Card
Weight class				Method	Round	Time	Notes
Middleweight	Zachary Reese	def.	Eli Aronov	Submission (armbar)	1	1:14
Welterweight	Oban Elliott	def.	Kaik Brito	Decision (majority) (29–28, 29–28, 28–28)	3	5:00
Women's Strawweight	Josefine Lindgren Knutsson	def.	Isis Verbeek	Decision (unanimous) (30–27, 30–27, 30–27)	3	5:00
Featherweight	Luis Pajuelo	def.	Robbie Ring	TKO (knee to the body and punches)	1	3:43

=== Contract awards ===
The following fighters were awarded contracts with the UFC:

- Luis Pajuelo, Oban Elliott, and Zachary Reese

== Week 4 – August 29 ==
=== Background ===
Val Woodburn was expected to face Marco Tulio Silva in a middleweight bout at the event, but he was pulled in order to face Bo Nickal at UFC 290. He was replaced by Yousri Belgaroui.

Dana White's Contender Series 60
- Promotion: DWCS
- Date: August 29, 2023
- Venue: UFC Apex Centre
- City: Las Vegas, Nevada, United States

Main Card
Weight class				Method	Round	Time	Notes
Welterweight	Carlos Prates	def.	Mitch Ramirez	TKO (punch)	2	1:14
Middleweight	Marco Tulio Silva	def.	Yousri Belgaroui	Decision (unanimous) (30–27, 29–28, 29–28)	3	5:00
Featherweight	Timothy Cuamba	def.	Mateo Vogel	Decision (unanimous) (29–28, 29–28, 29–28)	3	5:00
Heavyweight	Thomas Petersen	def.	Chandler Cole	Submission (keylock)	2	1:08
Lightweight	Bolaji Oki	def.	Dylan Salvador	TKO (punches)	1	2:46

=== Contract awards ===
The following fighters were awarded contracts with the UFC:

- Bolaji Oki, Thomas Petersen, and Carlos Prates

== Week 5 – September 5 ==
=== Background ===
Corinne Laframboise was expected to face Rainn Guerrero in a women's flyweight bout at the event, but she was pulled after discovering she was pregnant during pre-fight medical screenings. She was replaced by Dione Barbosa. Cam Rowston was expected to face Chad Hanekom in a middleweight bout but was replaced by Dylan Budka for unknown reasons.

Dana White's Contender Series 61
- Promotion: DWCS
- Date: September 5, 2023
- Venue: UFC Apex Centre
- City: Las Vegas, Nevada, United States

Main Card
Weight class				Method	Round	Time	Notes
Light Heavyweight	Brendson Ribeiro	def.	Bruno Lopes	KO (punches)	1	3:47
Bantamweight	Serhiy Sidey	def.	Ramon Taveras	TKO (punches)	1	2:26
Middleweight	Dylan Budka	def.	Chad Hanekom	Decision (unanimous) (29–28, 29–28, 29–28)	3	5:00
Featherweight	Jean Silva	def.	Kevin Vallejos	Decision (unanimous) (29–28, 29–28, 29–28)	3	5:00
Women's Flyweight	Dione Barbosa	def.	Rainn Guerrero	Submission (armbar)	1	4:35

=== Contract awards ===
The following fighters (all winners of the night) were awarded contracts with the UFC:

- Dione Barbosa, Jean Silva, Dylan Budka, Serhiy Sidey, and Brendson Ribeiro

== Week 6 – September 12 ==
Dana White's Contender Series 62
- Promotion: DWCS
- Date: September 12, 2023
- Venue: UFC Apex Centre
- City: Las Vegas, Nevada, United States

Main Card
Weight class				Method	Round	Time	Notes
Lightweight	James Llontop	def.	Malik Lewis	Decision (unanimous) (30–27, 30–26, 30–26)	3	5:00
Heavyweight	Jhonata Diniz	def.	Eduardo Neves	TKO (punches)	1	3:15
Featherweight	Steven Nguyen	def.	A.J. Cunningham	TKO (punches)	2	4:06
Women's Strawweight	Julia Polastri	def.	Patricia Alujas	Submission (rear-naked choke)	2	4:05
Bantamweight	Jean Matsumoto	def.	Kasey Tanner	Decision (unanimous) (30–27, 29–28, 29–28)	3	5:00

=== Contract awards ===
The following fighters were awarded contracts with the UFC:

- James Llontop, Jhonata Diniz, Steven Nguyen, Julia Polastri, and Jean Matsumoto

== Week 7 – September 19 ==
Dana White's Contender Series 63
- Promotion: DWCS
- Date: September 19, 2023
- Venue: UFC Apex Centre
- City: Las Vegas, Nevada, United States

Main Card
Weight class				Method	Round	Time	Notes
Heavyweight	Shamil Gaziev	def.	Greg Velasco	Submission (rear-naked choke)	1	2:38
Lightweight	Daniel James Allen	def.	JaCobi Jones	Decision (unanimous) (30–27, 30–27, 29–28)	3	5:00
Women's Strawweight	Talita Alencar	vs.	Stephanie Luciano	Draw (unanimous) (28–28, 28–28, 28–28)	3	5:00
Welterweight	Kaynan Kruschewsky	def.	Dylan Mantello	Technical Submission (rear-naked choke)	1	2:52
Flyweight	Igor Severino	def.	Jhonata Silva	TKO (punches)	2	2:37

=== Contract awards ===
The following fighters were awarded contracts with the UFC:

- Igor Severino, Kaynan Kruschewsky, Stephanie Luciano, and Shamil Gaziev

== Week 8 – September 26 ==
Dana White's Contender Series 64
- Promotion: DWCS
- Date: September 26, 2023
- Venue: UFC Apex Centre
- City: Las Vegas, Nevada, United States

Main Card
Weight class				Method	Round	Time	Notes
Welterweight	Danny Barlow	def.	Raheam Forest	TKO (punches)	1	1:19
Heavyweight	Mario Piazzon	def.	Alexander Soldatkin	DQ (illegal knee)	3	0:20
Featherweight	Danny Silva	def.	Angel Pacheco	Decision (unanimous) (30–27, 30–27, 30–27)	3	5:00
Women's Flyweight	Ernesta Kareckaitė	def.	Carli Judice	Decision (split) (29–28, 28–29, 29–28)	3	5:00
Bantamweight	Vinicius Oliveira	def.	Victor Hugo Madrigal	KO (punch)	1	3:02

=== Contract awards ===
The following fighters were awarded contracts with the UFC:

- Vinicius de Oliveira, Ernesta Kareckaitė, Carli Judice, Danny Silva, Angel Pacheco, and Danny Barlow

== Week 9 – October 3 ==
Dana White's Contender Series 65
- Promotion: DWCS
- Date: October 3, 2023
- Venue: UFC Apex Centre
- City: Las Vegas, Nevada, United States

=== Background ===
Lucas Rocha and Davi Bittencourt were scheduled to fight on this card in a flyweight bout. However, Rocha missed weight by five pounds and the bout was cancelled. The bout was rebooked for the following week.

Main Card
Weight class				Method	Round	Time	Notes
Light Heavyweight	Rodolfo Bellato	def.	Murtaza Talha	TKO (punches)	2	4:46
Bantamweight	Victor Hugo Silva	def.	Eduardo Matias Torres	Submission (kneebar)	2	2:16
Light Heavyweight	Magomed Gadzhiyasulov	def.	José Daniel Medina	Decision (unanimous) (30–27, 30–27, 30–27)	3	5:00
Welterweight	Maurício Ruffy	def.	Raimond Magomedaliev	TKO (punches)	3	4:45

=== Contract awards ===
The following fighters were awarded contracts with the UFC:

- Maurício Ruffy, Magomed Gadzhiyasulov, José Daniel Medina, Victor Hugo Silva, and Rodolfo Bellato

== Week 10 – October 10 ==
Dana White's Contender Series 66
- Promotion: DWCS
- Date: October 10, 2023
- Venue: UFC Apex Centre
- City: Las Vegas, Nevada, United States

Main Card
Weight class				Method	Round	Time	Notes
Bantamweight	Ramon Taveras	def.	Cortavious Romious	KO (punch)	1	0:29
Flyweight	André Lima	def.	Rickson Thai Zenidim	Decision (unanimous) (30–27, 30–27, 30–27)	3	5:00
Featherweight	Connor Matthews	def.	Jair Farias	Decision (unanimous) (30–27, 30–27, 29–28)	3	5:00
Middleweight	Torrez Finney	def.	Yuri Panferov	Submission (rear-naked choke)	2	2:43
Lightweight	MarQuel Mederos	def.	Issa Isakov	KO (knee)	1	4:09
Flyweight	Lucas Rocha	def.	Davi Bittencourt	KO (knee)	2	0:18

=== Contract awards ===
The following fighters were awarded contracts with the UFC:

- Lucas Rocha, MarQuel Mederos, Connor Matthews, André Lima, and Ramon Taveras
