= UFC Fight Night: Kape vs. Horiguchi =

Mixed martial arts event in 2026

- The poster for UFC Fight Night: Kape vs. Horiguchi
- Promotion: Ultimate Fighting Championship
- Date: June 20, 2026
- Venue: Meta Apex
- City: Enterprise, Nevada, United States
- Attendance: Not announced

Event chronology
UFC Freedom 250	UFC Fight Night: Kape vs. Horiguchi	UFC Fight Night: Fiziev vs. Torres

UFC Fight Night: Kape vs. Horiguchi (also known as UFC Fight Night 279 and UFC Vegas 119) was a mixed martial arts event produced by the Ultimate Fighting Championship that took place on June 20, 2026, at the Meta Apex in Enterprise, Nevada, part of the Las Vegas Valley, United States.

== Background ==
A flyweight rematch between former RIZIN Bantamweight Champion Manel Kape and former UFC Flyweight Championship challenger Kyoji Horiguchi (who is also a former RIZIN Flyweight and two-time RIZIN Bantamweight Champion, as well as former Bellator Bantamweight World Champion) served as the event headliner. The pair first met in December 2017 at Rizin World Grand Prix 2017: Final Round, where Horiguchi defeated Kape in the semi-finals via arm-triangle choke submission in the third round.

Mitch Raposo and Allan Nascimento were expected to meet in a flyweight bout at UFC Fight Night: Burns vs. Malott in April. However, Raposo was forced off the event due to illness, so the bout was re-scheduled for this event.

A heavyweight bout between Jhonata Diniz and José Luiz was scheduled for the event. However, Diniz had to withdraw for unknown reasons and the bout was scrapped.

A bantamweight bout between Farid Basharat and Ethyn Ewing was scheduled for the event. However, for undisclosed reasons, the bout was moved to UFC 329, which was re-scheduled to take place three weeks later.

A featherweight bout between Giga Chikadze and Vinicius Oliveira was scheduled for the event. However, Chikadze had to withdraw for undisclosed reasons and was replaced by Andre Fili.

At the weigh-ins, Kevin Borjas weighed in at 129 pounds, three pounds over the flyweight non-title fight limit. His bout proceeded at catchweight and he was fined 30 percent of his purse, which went to his opponent André Lima.

== Results ==
Main card (Paramount+)
Weight class				Method	Round	Time	Notes
Flyweight	Manel Kape	def.	Kyoji Horiguchi	TKO (punches)	3	2:42
Light Heavyweight	Navajo Stirling	def.	Ion Cuțelaba	TKO (punches and elbows)	2	3:23
Featherweight	Christian Rodriguez	def.	Hyder Amil	Technical Submission (guillotine choke)	1	3:43
Featherweight	Murtazali Magomedov	def.	Melsik Baghdasaryan	Submission (twister)	1	1:17
Featherweight	Vinicius Oliveira	def.	Andre Fili	TKO (elbows and punches)	2	4:56
Preliminary card (Paramount+)
Catchweight (129 lb)	Kevin Borjas	def.	André Lima	Decision (unanimous) (30–27, 29–28, 29–28)	3	5:00
Women's Bantamweight	Beatriz Mesquita	def.	Melissa Mullins	Submission (armbar)	1	3:16
Flyweight	Mitch Raposo	def.	Allan Nascimento	Decision (split) (29–28, 28–29, 29–28)	3	5:00
Featherweight	Gastón Bolaños	def.	Michael Aswell Jr.	Decision (unanimous) (29–28, 29–28, 29–28)	3	5:00
Welterweight	Levan Chokheli	def.	Leon Shahbazyan	TKO (leg kicks and punches)	1	0:23
Women's Bantamweight	Luana Santos	def.	Karol Rosa	Decision (unanimous) (30–27, 30–27, 30–27)	3	5:00
Featherweight	Shane Collins	def.	Otari Tanzilovi	Decision (unanimous) (30–27, 30–27, 30–27)	3	5:00

== Bonus awards ==
The following fighters received $100,000 bonuses. The other finishes received $25,000 additional bonuses.

- Fight of the Night: Vinicius Oliveira vs. Andre Fili
- Performance of the Night: Manel Kape and Murtazali Magomedov

== See also ==
- 2026 in UFC
- List of current UFC fighters
- List of UFC events
