= UFC on ESPN: Ribas vs. Namajunas =

2024 mixed martial event in Nevada, US

- The poster for UFC on ESPN: Ribas vs. Namajunas
- Promotion: Ultimate Fighting Championship
- Date: March 23, 2024
- Venue: UFC Apex
- City: Enterprise, Nevada, United States
- Attendance: Not announced

Event chronology
UFC Fight Night: Tuivasa vs. Tybura	UFC on ESPN: Ribas vs. Namajunas	UFC on ESPN: Blanchfield vs. Fiorot

UFC on ESPN: Ribas vs. Namajunas (also known as UFC on ESPN 53 and UFC Vegas 89) was a mixed martial arts event produced by the Ultimate Fighting Championship that took place on March 23, 2024, at the UFC Apex in Enterprise, Nevada, part of the Las Vegas Valley, United States.

== Background ==
A women's flyweight bout between Amanda Ribas and former two-time UFC Women's Strawweight Champion Rose Namajunas headlined the event.

A heavyweight bout between Chris Barnett and The Ultimate Fighter: Team Peña vs. Team Nunes heavyweight winner Mohammed Usman was scheduled for this event. However, Barnett withdrew due to unknown reason and was replaced by Mick Parkin.

Edmen Shahbazyan and Duško Todorović were expected to meet in a middleweight bout at the event. However, Todorović pulled out due to a serious knee injury and was replaced by A.J. Dobson.

A women's strawweight bout between Shauna Bannon and Stephanie Luciano was expected to take place at this event. However, Bannon pulled out for unknown reasons and was replaced by Julia Polastri. In turn, the bout was cancelled when Luciano was forced to withdraw due to falling ill with dengue fever.

A heavyweight bout between Junior Tafa and Karl Williams was expected to take place at the event. However, Tafa stepped in on short notice as a replacement for his brother Justin Tafa against Marcos Rogério de Lima at UFC 298 and was eventually unable to compete at this event after losing via TKO. He was eventually replaced by Justin at this event.

A featherweight bout between Billy Quarantillo and Gabriel Miranda was expected to take place at the event. However, Miranda was replaced by Youssef Zalal for unknown reasons.

A bantamweight bout between Cody Gibson and Davey Grant was expected to take place at the event. However, Grant withdrew due to injury and was replaced by former LFA Bantamweight Champion Miles Johns.

== Results ==
Main card (ESPN / ESPN+)
Weight class				Method	Round	Time	Notes
Women's Flyweight	Rose Namajunas	def.	Amanda Ribas	Decision (unanimous) (49–46, 49–46, 48–47)	5	5:00
Heavyweight	Karl Williams	def.	Justin Tafa	Decision (unanimous) (30–27, 29–28, 29–28)	3	5:00
Middleweight	Edmen Shahbazyan	def.	A.J. Dobson	KO (punches)	1	4:43
Bantamweight	Payton Talbott	def.	Cameron Saaiman	TKO (punches)	2	0:21
Featherweight	Youssef Zalal	def.	Billy Quarantillo	Submission (rear-naked choke)	2	1:50
Featherweight	Fernando Padilla	def.	Luis Pajuelo	Submission (brabo choke)	1	2:45
Preliminary card (ESPN+)
Lightweight	Trey Ogden	def.	Kurt Holobaugh	Decision (unanimous) (30–27, 30–27, 30–27)	3	5:00
Featherweight	Julian Erosa	def.	Ricardo Ramos	Submission (guillotine choke)	1	2:15
Bantamweight	Miles Johns	def.	Cody Gibson	Decision (unanimous) (30–27, 30–27, 30–27)	3	5:00
Featherweight	Jarno Errens	def.	Steven Nguyen	Decision (unanimous) (30–27, 30–27, 30–27)	3	5:00
Women's Bantamweight	Darya Zheleznyakova	def.	Montserrat Rendon	Decision (unanimous) (29–28, 29–28, 29–28)	3	5:00
Flyweight	André Lima	def.	Igor Severino	DQ (biting)	2	2:52
Heavyweight	Mick Parkin	def.	Mohammed Usman	Decision (unanimous) (29–28, 29–28, 29–28)	3	5:00

== Bonus awards ==
The following fighters received $50,000 bonuses.

- Fight of the Night: Jarno Errens vs. Steven Nguyen
- Performance of the Night: Payton Talbott and Fernando Padilla

== Aftermath ==
After the first ever disqualification due to biting took place at this event, UFC CEO Dana White gave a Bite of the Night $50,000 bonus to André Lima whose bout ended prematurely as a result of being bit on the arm by opponent Igor Severino. Severino was subsequently released from his contract with the promotion. The Nevada Athletic Commission also announced that it would withhold Severino's purse and he is expected to receive a heavy fine and lengthy suspension when the NAC holds its monthly meeting in April.

== See also ==
- 2024 in UFC
- List of current UFC fighters
- List of UFC events
