= Hyder Amil =

Filipino and American mixed martial artist (born 1990)

- Born: Hyder Osman Amil; May 28, 1990 (age 36); Cebu City, Central Visayas, Philippines
- Other names: The Hurricane
- Height: 5 ft 9 in (1.75 m)
- Weight: 145 lb (66 kg; 10 st 5 lb)
- Division: Featherweight
- Reach: 70 in (178 cm)
- Fighting out of: San Francisco, California, U.S.
- Team: El Niño Training Center
- Years active: 2017–present

Mixed martial arts record
- Total: 14
- Wins: 11
- By knockout: 6
- By submission: 1
- By decision: 4
- Losses: 3
- By knockout: 1
- By submission: 1
- By decision: 1

Other information
- Mixed martial arts record from Sherdog

Hyder Osman Amil (born May 28, 1990) is a Filipino and American mixed martial artist. He currently competes in the Featherweight division of the Ultimate Fighting Championship (UFC).

== Background ==
Amil was born in Cebu City, Philippines to a Turkish-Indian father and a Filipino mother. As a kid, Amil, his mother and sister, were physically abused by his father. He learned martial arts, which gave him confidence and helped protect his family. At the age of six, he and his family moved to United States to escape the abuse of his father.

== Mixed martial arts career ==
=== Early career ===
Starting his career in 2017, Amil fought exclusively for Bellator MMA and Legacy Fighting Alliance, where he acquired a 7–0 record before his fight at Dana White's Contender Series.

=== Dana White's Contender Series ===
Amil faced Emrah Sonmez on August 15, 2023, at DWCS season 7 - Week 2. At the weigh-ins, Sonmez came in at 147 pounds, 1 pounds over the featherweight non-title fight limit. Despite the relatively small miss, Nevada Athletic Commission officials did not allow Sonmez to continue his cut. That the bout proceeded at catchweight, with Sonmez was fined a percentage of his purse, which went to Amil. He won the fight via unanimous decision and he was awarded a UFC contract.

=== Ultimate Fighting Championship ===
In his promotional debut, Amil was scheduled to face Shayilan Nuerdanbieke on February 10, 2024, at UFC Fight Night 236. However, Nuerdanbieke pulled out due to undisclosed reasons and was replaced by Melsik Baghdasaryan. In turn, Baghdasaryan pulled out on fight week due to injury and was replaced by Fernie Garcia. He won the fight via technical knockout in round two.

Amil faced Lee Jeong-yeong on July 20, 2024, at UFC on ESPN 60. He won the fight via technical knockout in round one. This fight earned his another Performance of the Night award.

Amil faced William Gomis on March 1, 2025, at UFC Fight Night 253. He won the fight via split decision.

Amil faced José Miguel Delgado on June 28, 2025, at UFC 317. He lost the fight by technical knockout 26 seconds into the first round.

Replacing an injured Austin Bashi, Amil faced Jamall Emmers on November 8, 2025, at UFC Fight Night 264. He lost the fight by unanimous decision.

Amil faced Christian Rodriguez on June 20, 2026 at UFC Fight Night 279. He lost the fight via a ninja choke submission in the first round.

== Championships and accomplishments ==
- Ultimate Fighting Championship
  - Performance of the Night (One time) vs. Lee Jeong-yeong

== Mixed martial arts record ==
Professional record breakdown
14 matches	11 wins	3 losses
By knockout	6	1
By submission	1	1
By decision	4	1

Res.	Record	Opponent	Method	Event	Date	Round	Time	Location	Notes
Loss	11–3	Christian Rodriguez	Technical Submission (guillotine choke)	UFC Fight Night: Kape vs. Horiguchi	June 20, 2026	1	3:43	Las Vegas, Nevada, United States	
Loss	11–2	Jamall Emmers	Decision (unanimous)	UFC Fight Night: Bonfim vs. Brown	November 8, 2025	3	5:00	Las Vegas, Nevada, United States	
Loss	11–1	José Miguel Delgado	KO (knee and elbows)	UFC 317	June 28, 2025	1	0:26	Las Vegas, Nevada, United States	
Win	11–0	William Gomis	Decision (split)	UFC Fight Night: Kape vs. Almabayev	March 1, 2025	3	5:00	Las Vegas, Nevada, United States	
Win	10–0	Lee Jeong-yeong	TKO (punches)	UFC on ESPN: Lemos vs. Jandiroba	July 20, 2024	1	1:05	Las Vegas, Nevada, United States	Performance of the Night.
Win	9–0	Fernie Garcia	TKO (punches)	UFC Fight Night: Hermansson vs. Pyfer	February 10, 2024	2	2:12	Las Vegas, Nevada, United States	
Win	8–0	Emrah Sonmez	Decision (unanimous)	Dana White's Contender Series 58	August 15, 2023	3	5:00	Las Vegas, Nevada, United States	Catchweight (147 lb) bout; Sonmez missed weight.
Win	7–0	Chase Gibson	TKO (punches)	LFA 137	July 29, 2022	2	0:11	Commerce, California, United States	
Win	6–0	Devante Sewell	Decision (split)	LFA 129	April 15, 2022	3	5:00	Prior Lake, Minnesota, United States	
Win	5–0	Robson Junior	TKO (knees and punches)	LFA 117	November 5, 2021	2	3:26	Visalia, California, United States	Catchweight (150 lb) bout.
Win	4–0	Ignacio Ortiz	Decision (split)	Bellator 226	September 7, 2019	3	5:00	San Jose, California, United States	
Win	3–0	Paradise Vaovasa	Submission (rear-naked choke)	Bellator 220	April 27, 2019	1	2:34	San Jose, California, United States	
Win	2–0	Elias Anderson	TKO (punches)	Bellator 199	May 12, 2018	2	3:01	San Jose, California, United States	Catchweight (140 lb) bout.
Win	1–0	Adam Cruz	TKO (punches)	Dragon House 27	November 18, 2017	2	1:04	San Francisco, California, United States	Featherweight debut.

== See also ==
- List of current UFC fighters
- List of male mixed martial artists
