= Igor Severino =

Brazilian mixed martial artist (born 2003)

- Born: April 21, 2003 (age 23); Juruti, Pará, Brazil
- Other names: The Hannibal
- Height: 5 ft 7 in (1.70 m)
- Weight: 135 lb (61 kg; 9 st 9 lb)
- Division: Flyweight (2018–2024); Bantamweight (2024–present)
- Reach: 69.5 in (177 cm)
- Fighting out of: Bauru, Brazil
- Team: Chute Boxe João Emilio
- Years active: 2017–present

Mixed martial arts record
- Total: 13
- Wins: 11
- By knockout: 6
- By submission: 4
- By decision: 1
- Losses: 1
- By disqualification: 1
- No contests: 1

Other information
- Mixed martial arts record from Sherdog

Igor da Silva Severino (born April 21, 2003) is a Brazilian mixed martial artist. He currently competes in the Bantamweight division of Oktagon MMA, where he is the current Oktagon Bantamweight Champion. He previously competed in the Ultimate Fighting Championship (UFC).

== Mixed martial arts career ==
=== Early career ===
During 2018–2022, Severino completed in Brazil regional promotion. He amassed a record of 7–0 record before his fight at Dana White's Contender Series.

=== Dana White's Contender Series ===
Severino completed at DWCS season 7: Week 7 on September 19, 2023, against Jhonata Silva. He won the fight via technical knockout in round two and he was awarded a UFC contract.

=== Ultimate Fighting Championship ===
In his UFC debut, Severino faced André Lima on March 23, 2024, at UFC on ESPN 53. He lost the fight via disqualification after attempting to bite a chunk out of his opponent, with Lima left showing off a deep bite mark on his arm following the bout.

After his fight was disqualified for biting opponent, Severino was subsequently released from his contract with the promotion. On June 25, 2024, Severino then received a nine-month suspension and was fined $2,000 by the Nevada State Athletic Commission (NSAC) and was eligible to return on December 23, 2024.

=== Oktagon MMA ===
On April 27, 2024, it was reported that Severino signed with the Oktagon MMA.

In his promotional debut, Severino made his return against Jonas Mågård on December 29, 2024, at Oktagon 65. He won the fight via split decision.

Severino was scheduled to face Jack Cartwright for the vacant Oktagon Bantamweight Championship on April 26, 2025, at Oktagon 70. However on April 12, the promotion announced that Cartwright had suffered an injury. The bout was then re-scheduled to take place on August 9, 2025, at Oktagon 74. In turn, Cartwright withdrew once again due to injury and was replaced by Elvis Batista da Silva. Subsequently, the bout was cancelled once again due to an injury, although it isn’t clear which fighter couldn’t compete at this time.

Severino was scheduled to face Khurshed Kakhorov for the vacant Oktagon Bantamweight Championship on October 18, 2025, at Oktagon 78. At the weigh-ins, Kakhorov weighed in at 135.8 lb, 0.8 pounds over the limit. As a result, Balart was ineligible for the title, which left only Severino eligible to win the title. However, before the event started, Kakhorov was forced to withdraw from the event due to health issues. Therefore, the bantamweight title bout was cancelled once again.

== Championships and accomplishments ==
- Jungle Fight
  - Jungle Fight Flyweight Championship (One time)
- Oktagon MMA
  - Oktagon Bantamweight Championship (One time, current)

== Mixed martial arts record ==
Professional record breakdown
13 matches	11 wins	1 loss
By knockout	6	0
By submission	4	0
By decision	1	0
By disqualification	0	1
No contests	1	

Res.	Record	Opponent	Method	Event	Date	Round	Time	Location	Notes
Win	11–1 (1)	Max Holzer	TKO (punches)	Oktagon 97	November 7, 2026	1	0:54	Hanover, Germany	Defended the Oktagon Bantamweight Championship. Performance of the Night.
NC	10–1 (1)	Zhalgas Zhumagulov	NC (accidental punch to the groin)	Oktagon 89	June 6, 2026	2	2:26	Bratislava, Slovakia	Retained the Oktagon Bantamweight Championship. Accidental punch to the groin rendered Zhumagulov unable to continue.
Win	10–1	Khurshed Kakhorov	TKO (punches)	Oktagon 85	March 7, 2026	2	1:38	Hamburg, Germany	Won the vacant Oktagon Bantamweight Championship. Performance of the Night.
Win	9–1	Jonas Mågård	Decision (split)	Oktagon 65	December 29, 2024	3	5:00	Prague, Czech Republic	Bantamweight debut.
Loss	8–1	André Lima	DQ (biting)	UFC on ESPN: Ribas vs. Namajunas	March 23, 2024	2	2:52	Las Vegas, Nevada, United States	
Win	8–0	Jhonata Silva	TKO (punches)	Dana White's Contender Series 63	September 19, 2023	2	2:37	Las Vegas, Nevada, United States	
Win	7–0	Manoel Rodrigues de Lima	TKO (punches)	Jungle Fight 110	August 27, 2022	2	4:58	Rio de Janeiro, Brazil	Won the vacant Jungle Fight Flyweight Championship.
Win	6–0	Lucas Kenner	Submission (north-south choke)	Jungle Fight 106	March 27, 2022	1	4:04	Santa Luzia, Brazil	
Win	5–0	Davi de Souza Almeida	TKO (punches to the body)	Jungle Fight 104	December 28, 2021	2	1:08	São Paulo, Brazil	
Win	4–0	Wellington Rocha Moura	Submission (guillotine choke)	Jungle Fight 103	November 28, 2021	1	1:58	São Paulo, Brazil	
Win	3–0	Gabriel Rodrigues Oliveira	TKO (doctor stoppage)	Rei da Selva Combat 15	September 28, 2019	1	1:27	Manaus, Brazil	Catchweight (128 lb) bout.
Win	2–0	Jhonatas Souza	Submission (armbar)	Pitbull Fight Combat 3	July 6, 2019	3	2:01	Terra Santa, Brazil	
Win	1–0	Jean Carlos Santino	Submission (rear-naked choke)	Alternativa Fight Combat 4	December 15, 2018	1	1:58	Juruti, Brazil	Flyweight debut.

== See also ==
- List of current Oktagon MMA fighters
- List of male mixed martial artists
