= Payton Talbott =

American mixed martial artist (born 1998)

- Born: Payton Anthony Talbott; September 9, 1998 (age 28); Las Vegas, Nevada, U.S.
- Height: 5 ft 10 in (178 cm)
- Weight: 135 lb (61 kg; 9 st 9 lb)
- Division: Bantamweight
- Reach: 70.5 in (179 cm)
- Fighting out of: Reno, Nevada, U.S.
- Team: Reno Academy of Combat
- Trainer: Rick Collup
- Years active: 2021–present

Mixed martial arts record
- Total: 13
- Wins: 12
- By knockout: 8
- By submission: 1
- By decision: 3
- Losses: 1
- By decision: 1

Amateur record
- Total: 5
- Wins: 5
- By knockout: 3
- By submission: 2

Other information
- Mixed martial arts record from Sherdog
- Last updated on: October 3, 2026

Payton Anthony Talbott (born September 9, 1998) is an American professional mixed martial artist. He currently competes in the Bantamweight division of the Ultimate Fighting Championship (UFC). A professional since 2021, he earned his contract with the promotion after going through Dana White's Contender Series. As of October 17, 2026, he is #10 in the Meta UFC bantamweight rankings.

== Background ==
Talbott was born on September 9, 1998, in Las Vegas, Nevada, and grew up in Reno, Nevada. He is partly of African American and Choctaw descent. His mother is a plastic surgeon, and he has four siblings: one sister and three brothers. Before discovering mixed martial arts, Talbott played football and competitively wrestled while attending Reno High School.

Talbott graduated from the University of Nevada in 2022 with a bachelor's degree in psychology and a minor in music. Early in his martial arts career he worked as a barista and had plans of becoming a firefighter.

== Mixed martial arts career ==
=== Early career ===
In 2017, Talbott started training in mixed martial arts at the Reno Academy of Combat. He chose to begin mixed martial arts classes when he saw Conor McGregor’s highlights while sitting at a restaurant, having stopped sports for his college studies. After seven to eight months of training, his coaches proposed to him to make his amateur debut. Talbott then faced all his first opponents in several amateur King of the Cage: Future Legends events from March 2018 to August 2021. He became a two-time KOTC Amateur Bantamweight Champion during his amateur run before turning professional with a total 5–0 amateur record and a 100% finish rate.

Talbott made his professional debut on November 27, 2021, at FirePower 3: Magnum Force in Sacramento, California and finished his opponent in the second round. After a second technical knockout win at FirePower 4: Sudden Impact, he made his third fight at Urijah Faber's A1 Combat and won the A1 Combat Bantamweight Championship on May 28, 2022 in Wheatland, California, beating Hector Fajardo by technical knockout in the second round. He then successfully defended his title twice and won both fights via technical knockout. First, he finished Anthony Jimenez with a flying knee and punches in the second round on October 22, 2022. Talbott then defeated Cristhian Rivas with punches and elbow strikes in round three on March 18, 2023.

=== Dana White’s Contender Series ===
On August 8, 2023, Talbott faced Reyes Cortez Jr. on Dana White's Contender Series: Season 7, Week 1. Talbott won the fight via unanimous decision. This victory earned him a contract in the Ultimate Fighting Championship.

=== Ultimate Fighting Championship ===
Talbott then made his promotional debut on November 18, 2023, facing Nick Aguirre at UFC Fight Night 232. He won the fight by submission in the third round via rear-naked choke.

For his second bout in the UFC, he faced Cameron Saaiman on March 23, 2024, at UFC on ESPN 53. He ended up winning the fight by technical knockout in round two. This victory earned him his first Performance of the Night bonus award.

Talbott faced French-Algerian fighter Yanis Ghemmouri on June 29, 2024, at UFC 303. He won the fight via knockout 19 seconds in the first round. This win earned him another Performance of the Night award.

Talbott faced Raoni Barcelos on January 18, 2025 at UFC 311. In a bout where he was largely controlled and outwrestled, he lost the fight by unanimous decision leading to his first loss in mixed martial arts.

Talbott faced Felipe Lima on June 28, 2025, at UFC 317. He won the fight by unanimous decision.

Talbott faced former UFC Flyweight and Bantamweight Champion Henry Cejudo on December 6, 2025 at UFC 323. He won the fight by unanimous decision becoming the last fight of Henry Cejudo’s career.

Talbott faced former UFC Flyweight Champion Deiveson Figueiredo on October 3, 2026, at UFC 332. He won the fight by technical knockout in the first round.

== Championships and accomplishments ==
=== Mixed martial arts ===
==== Professional ====
- Ultimate Fighting Championship
  - Performance of the Night (Two times) vs. Cameron Saaiman and Yanis Ghemmouri
  - Third fastest knockout/finish in UFC Bantamweight division history (0:19) vs. Yanis Ghemmouri
- Urijah Faber's A1 Combat
  - A1 Combat Bantamweight Championship (One time)
    - Two successful title defenses
- MMA Fighting
  - 2024 Third Team MMA All-Star
- ESPN
  - 2025 Most Improved Fighter

==== Amateur ====
- King of the Cage
  - KOTC Amateur Bantamweight Championship (One time)

== Mixed martial arts record ==
Professional record breakdown
13 matches	12 wins	1 loss
By knockout	8	0
By submission	1	0
By decision	3	1

Res.	Record	Opponent	Method	Event	Date	Round	Time	Location	Notes
Win	12–1	Deiveson Figueiredo	TKO (punches)	UFC 332	October 3, 2026	1	2:09	Salt Lake City, Utah, United States	
Win	11–1	Henry Cejudo	Decision (unanimous)	UFC 323	December 6, 2025	3	5:00	Las Vegas, Nevada, United States	
Win	10–1	Felipe Lima	Decision (unanimous)	UFC 317	June 28, 2025	3	5:00	Las Vegas, Nevada, United States	
Loss	9–1	Raoni Barcelos	Decision (unanimous)	UFC 311	January 18, 2025	3	5:00	Inglewood, California, United States	
Win	9–0	Yanis Ghemmouri	KO (punches)	UFC 303	June 29, 2024	1	0:19	Las Vegas, Nevada, United States	Performance of the Night.
Win	8–0	Cameron Saaiman	TKO (punches)	UFC on ESPN: Ribas vs. Namajunas	March 23, 2024	2	0:21	Las Vegas, Nevada, United States	Performance of the Night.
Win	7–0	Nick Aguirre	Submission (rear-naked choke)	UFC Fight Night: Allen vs. Craig	November 18, 2023	3	0:58	Las Vegas, Nevada, United States	
Win	6–0	Reyes Cortez Jr.	Decision (unanimous)	Dana White's Contender Series 57	August 8, 2023	3	5:00	Las Vegas, Nevada, United States	
Win	5–0	Cristhian Rivas	TKO (punches and elbows)	Urijah Faber's A1 Combat 9	March 18, 2023	3	1:35	Long Beach, California, United States	Defended the A1 Combat Bantamweight Championship.
Win	4–0	Anthony Jimenez	TKO (flying knee and punches)	Urijah Faber's A1 Combat 6	October 22, 2022	2	4:26	Commerce, California, United States	Defended the A1 Combat Bantamweight Championship.
Win	3–0	Hector Fajardo	TKO (punches)	Urijah Faber's A1 Combat 2	May 28, 2022	2	4:51	Wheatland, California, United States	Won the A1 Combat Bantamweight Championship.
Win	2–0	Billy Brand	TKO (punches)	FirePower 4	February 12, 2022	3	2:36	Sacramento, California, United States	
Win	1–0	Abdikabyl Kaldar	TKO (punches)	FirePower 3	November 27, 2021	2	3:06	Sacramento, California, United States	Bantamweight debut.

=== Amateur record ===
Amateur record breakdown		
5 matches	5 wins	0 losses
By knockout	3	0
By submission	2	0

Res.	Record	Opponent	Method	Event	Date	Round	Time	Location	Notes
Win	5–0	Alex Gamez	TKO (punch and head kick)	KOTC: Future Legends 47	August 21, 2021	2	0:12	Reno, Nevada, U.S.	Won the KOTC Bantamweight Championship.
Win	4–0	Cameron Sandoval	Submission (rear-naked choke)	KOTC: Future Legends 45	November 16, 2019	3	1:35	Reno, Nevada, U.S.	
Win	3–0	Taylor Cuisinot	TKO (punches)	KOTC: Future Legends 44	July 13, 2019	2	0:42	Reno, Nevada, U.S.	
Win	2–0	Joseph Lee	TKO (punches)	KOTC: Future Legends 41	August 25, 2018	3	2:42	Reno, Nevada, U.S.	
Win	1–0	Ernesto Villegas	Submission (rear-naked choke)	KOTC: Future Legends 40	March 16, 2018	2	1:12	Reno, Nevada, U.S.	

== See also ==
- List of current UFC fighters
- List of Dana White's Contender Series alumni
- List of male mixed martial artists
