= André Lima (fighter) =

Brazilian mixed martial artist (born 1999)

- Born: André Luis Lima Cardoso; February 4, 1999 (age 27); Feira de Santana, Bahia, Brazil
- Other names: Mascote
- Height: 5 ft 7 in (1.70 m)
- Weight: 56 kg (123 lb; 8 st 11 lb)
- Division: Flyweight
- Reach: 67 in (170 cm)
- Fighting out of: Guarulhos, Brazil
- Team: Team Lucas Mineiro; Mascote Team
- Years active: 2022–present

Mixed martial arts record
- Total: 13
- Wins: 12
- By knockout: 5
- By submission: 2
- By decision: 4
- By disqualification: 1
- Losses: 1
- By decision: 1

Other information
- Mixed martial arts record from Sherdog

André Luis Lima Cardoso (born 4 February 1999) is a Brazilian professional mixed martial artist who currently competes in the Flyweight division of the Ultimate Fighting Championship (UFC).

== Mixed martial arts career ==
=== Early career ===
Lima began his MMA career competing with five consecutive victories (four by knockout) on the Brazilian regional scene. His sixth win was against Igor Taylon at a LFA 162 event held in his home country. The fight was originally announced as a flyweight bout, but Lima was unable to make the required weight, so it was announced as a catchweight fight.

=== Dana White's Contender Series ===
On October 10, 2023, as part of the seventh season of Dana White's Contender Series, Lima was scheduled for the co-main event against Rickson Thai Zenidim Bueno. Lima not only defeated his opponent by unanimous decision and a favorable judges' scorecard, but he was also one of four fighters who earned a UFC contract.

=== Ultimate Fighting Championship ===
Lima made his promotional debut on March 23, 2024, facing Igor Severino at UFC on ESPN 53. He won the fight by disqualification after Severino bit him on the arm. As a result, Lima was awarded the Bite of the Night honor. The biting incident also resulted in Severino being released from his contract with the promoter.

Lima was expected to face Park Hyun-sung on June 1, 2024, at UFC 302. However, Hyun-sung was pulled from the event due to injury; Nyamjargal Tumendemberel had taken his place, but later withdrew due to visa issues, and his spot was filled by Mitch Raposo. At the event, Lima won the fight by split decision.

Lima faced Felipe Dos Santos on September 7, 2024, at UFC Fight Night 242. He won the fight by unanimous decision.

Lima faced Daniel Barez on March 15, 2025, at UFC Fight Night 254. He won the fight by submission in the third round. This victory earned him the Performance of the Night award.

Lima was scheduled to face Felipe Bunes on August 2, 2025, at UFC on ESPN 71. However, Lima withdrew from the fight due to an undisclosed injury and was replaced by Rafael Estevam.

Lima was scheduled to face Choi Dong-hun on April 11, 2026, at UFC 327. However, the bout was moved to UFC Fight Night 273 on April 18, 2026, for undisclosed reasons. In turn, Choi withdrew due to an injury, so the bout was scrapped.

Lima faced Kevin Borjas on June 20, 2026 at UFC Fight Night 279. At the weigh-ins, Borjas weighed in at 129 pounds, three pounds over the flyweight non-title fight limit. The bout proceeded at catchweight and he was fined 30 percent of his purse, which went to Lima. Lima lost the fight by unanimous decision.

Lima faced promotional newcomer Namsrai Batbayar on August 29, 2026 at UFC Fight Night 286. He won the fight via a guillotine choke submission in the third round.

== Championships and accomplishments ==
- Ultimate Fighting Championship
  - Performance of the Night (One time) vs. Daniel Barez
  - Bite of the Night (One time) vs. Igor Severino

== Mixed martial arts record ==
Professional record breakdown
13 matches	12 wins	1 loss
By knockout	5	0
By submission	2	0
By decision	4	1
By disqualification	1	0

Res.	Record	Opponent	Method	Event	Date	Round	Time	Location	Notes
Win	12–1	Namsrai Batbayar	Submission (guillotine choke)	UFC Fight Night: Nurmagomedov vs. Song	August 29, 2026	3	3:03	Shanghai, China	Catchweight (127 lb) bout; Lima missed weight.
Loss	11–1	Kevin Borjas	Decision (unanimous)	UFC Fight Night: Kape vs. Horiguchi	June 20, 2026	3	5:00	Las Vegas, Nevada, United States	Catchweight (129 lb) bout; Borjas missed weight.
Win	11–0	Daniel Barez	Submission (rear-naked choke)	UFC Fight Night: Vettori vs. Dolidze 2	March 15, 2025	3	3:03	Las Vegas, Nevada, United States	Performance of the Night.
Win	10–0	Felipe dos Santos	Decision (unanimous)	UFC Fight Night: Burns vs. Brady	September 7, 2024	3	5:00	Las Vegas, Nevada, United States	
Win	9–0	Mitch Raposo	Decision (split)	UFC 302	June 1, 2024	3	5:00	Newark, New Jersey, United States	Catchweight (130 lb) bout; Lima missed weight.
Win	8–0	Igor Severino	DQ (biting)	UFC on ESPN: Ribas vs. Namajunas	March 23, 2024	2	2:52	Las Vegas, Nevada, United States	
Win	7–0	Rickson Thai Zenidim	Decision (unanimous)	Dana White's Contender Series 66	October 10, 2023	3	5:00	Las Vegas, Nevada, United States	
Win	6–0	Igor Taylon	TKO (elbows)	LFA 162	July 7, 2023	2	4:59	Cajamar, Brazil	Catchweight (127 lb) bout; Lima missed weight.
Win	5–0	Alexandre Rodrigues	KO (punch)	R1 Fighting Series 2	May 28, 2023	1	2:11	Caraguatatuba, Brazil	Flyweight debut.
Win	4–0	Natan Ziele	TKO (punches)	Spartacus MMA 29	February 11, 2023	1	3:45	São Paulo, Brazil	
Win	3–0	Victor Santos	Decision (unanimous)	Spartacus MMA 25	December 17, 2022	3	5:00	São Paulo, Brazil	
Win	2–0	Luiz Henrique Martin	TKO (punches)	Spartacus MMA 20	November 12, 2022	1	1:01	São Paulo, Brazil	
Win	1–0	João Vitor Oliveira	KO (punch to the body)	Spartacus MMA 16	October 8, 2022	1	1:55	São Paulo, Brazil	Bantamweight debut.

== See also ==
- List of current UFC fighters
- List of male mixed martial artists
