= Jamall Emmers =

American mixed martial artist

- Born: Jamall Leantwean Emmers; July 24, 1989 (age 37); Miami, Florida, U.S.
- Nickname: Prettyboy
- Height: 5 ft 10 in (1.78 m)
- Weight: 145 lb (66 kg; 10.4 st)
- Division: Featherweight
- Reach: 74 in (188 cm)
- Fighting out of: Redlands, California, U.S.
- Team: Pinnacle MMA
- Rank: Black belt in Brazilian Jiu-Jitsu
- Years active: 2012–present

Mixed martial arts record
- Total: 31
- Wins: 23
- By knockout: 10
- By submission: 3
- By decision: 10
- Losses: 8
- By knockout: 3
- By submission: 2
- By decision: 3

Other information
- Mixed martial arts record from Sherdog

Jamall Leantwean Emmers (born July 24, 1989) is an American mixed martial artist who currently competes in the Featherweight division of the Ultimate Fighting Championship. As of November 14, 2026, he is #13 in the Meta UFC featherweight rankings.

== Background ==
Emmers transitioned to MMA from a high school and college wrestling background, but it was actually MMA that first inspired him. A fan of watching MMA fights with his dad and brother, Jamall's dad would rent PRIDE FC tapes from Blockbuster for them to watch. Emmers said he joined his high school wrestling team specifically to lay a foundation for a career in MMA.

== Mixed martial arts career ==
=== Early career and DWCS ===
Emmers racked up 13–3 record in American regional circuit, most notably holding a decision wins against future UFC fighters Alexander Hernandez and Cory Sandhagen at LFA 5. Emmers was invited to the Dana White's Contender Series. He faced Julian Erosa at Dana White's Contender Series 11 on June 26, 2018. Despite knocking Erosa down in the first round, Emmers lost the fight via second-round knockout.

=== Ultimate Fighting Championship ===
After the Contender Series loss Emmers won four straight fights and was signed to the UFC to fight Movsar Evloev at UFC 248 on March 7, 2020, on short notice, replacing Douglas Silva de Andrade. However, Evloev was injured in a motorcycle accident and was replaced by Giga Chikadze. Emmers lost the fight via split decision.

Emmers was expected to make his sophomore appearance in the organization against Timur Valiev at UFC Fight Night 173 on August 1, 2020. However, Valiev withdrew from the bout and was replaced by Vince Cachero. Emmers won the fight via unanimous decision.

Emmers was next expected to face Chas Skelly at UFC Fight Night 185 on February 20, 2021. However, the bout was cancelled moments before it was expected to begin as Emmers suffered back spasms backstage rendering him unable to compete.

Emmers faced Pat Sabatini on August 28, 2021, at UFC on ESPN 30. Emmers knocked down Sabatini early in the fight, but was caught by a heel hook and forced to submit in round one.

Emmers was scheduled to face Daniel Pineda on May 14, 2022, at UFC on ESPN 36. However, the bout was scrapped in late April for unknown reasons.

Emmers faced Khusein Askhabov on February 18, 2023, at UFC Fight Night 219. He won the fight via unanimous decision.

Emmers faced Jack Jenkins on June 24, 2023 at UFC on ABC 5. He lost the fight via split decision. 10 out of 10 media sources scored the fight in favor of Emmers.

Emmers faced Dennis Buzukja on November 11, 2023, at UFC 295. At the weigh-ins, Emmers came in at 147 pounds (one pound over the featherweight non-title bout limit). His bout with Buzukja proceeded at catchweight with Emmers forfeiting 20 percent of his purse. He won the fight via TKO in the first minute of the first round.

Emmers faced Nate Landwehr on March 30, 2024, at UFC on ESPN 54. He lost the fight via knockout in round one.

Emmers faced Gabriel Miranda on March 29, 2025 at UFC on ESPN 64. He won the fight by technical knockout in the first round.

Emmers was scheduled to face Austin Bashi on November 8, 2025, at UFC Fight Night 264. However, Bashi pulled out due to an injury and was replaced by Hyder Amil. Emmers won the fight by unanimous decision.

Emmers faced Lerryan Douglas on August 22, 2026 at UFC Fight Night 285. He won the fight via technical knockout in round one.

== Championships and accomplishments ==
- Hero FC
  - Hero FC Featherweight Championship (one time; former)
    - Two successful title defenses
- SMASH Global
  - SMASH Global Featherweight Championship (one time; former)

== Mixed martial arts record ==
Professional record breakdown
31 matches	23 wins	8 losses
By knockout	10	3
By submission	3	2
By decision	10	3

Res.	Record	Opponent	Method	Event	Date	Round	Time	Location	Notes
Win	23–8	Lerryan Douglas	TKO (punches)	UFC Fight Night: Hernandez vs. Rodrigues	August 22, 2026	1	3:38	Sacramento, California, United States	
Win	22–8	Hyder Amil	Decision (unanimous)	UFC Fight Night: Bonfim vs. Brown	November 8, 2025	3	5:00	Las Vegas, Nevada, United States	
Win	21–8	Gabriel Miranda	TKO (knee to the body and punches)	UFC on ESPN: Moreno vs. Erceg	March 29, 2025	1	4:06	Mexico City, Mexico	
Loss	20–8	Nate Landwehr	KO (punches)	UFC on ESPN: Blanchfield vs. Fiorot	March 30, 2024	1	4:43	Atlantic City, New Jersey, United States	
Win	20–7	Dennis Buzukja	TKO (punches)	UFC 295	November 11, 2023	1	0:49	New York City, New York, United States	Catchweight (147 lb) bout; Emmers missed weight.
Loss	19–7	Jack Jenkins	Decision (split)	UFC on ABC: Emmett vs. Topuria	June 24, 2023	3	5:00	Jacksonville, Florida, United States	
Win	19–6	Khusein Askhabov	Decision (unanimous)	UFC Fight Night: Andrade vs. Blanchfield	February 18, 2023	3	5:00	Las Vegas, Nevada, United States	
Loss	18–6	Pat Sabatini	Submission (heel hook)	UFC on ESPN: Barboza vs. Chikadze	August 28, 2021	1	1:53	Las Vegas, Nevada, United States	
Win	18–5	Vince Cachero	Decision (unanimous)	UFC Fight Night: Brunson vs. Shahbazyan	August 1, 2020	3	5:00	Las Vegas, Nevada, United States	
Loss	17–5	Giga Chikadze	Decision (split)	UFC 248	March 7, 2020	3	5:00	Las Vegas, Nevada, United States	
Win	17–4	Rafael Barbosa	Technical Submission (arm-triangle choke)	LFA 81	January 31, 2020	3	2:39	Costa Mesa, California, United States	
Win	16–4	Jay Cucciniello	TKO (punches)	Final Fight Championship 38	June 20, 2019	1	4:53	Las Vegas, Nevada, United States	
Win	15–4	Caio Machado	TKO (retirement)	M-1 Global: Road to M-1 USA 2	April 4, 2019	1	5:00	Fort Yuma Indian Reservation, California, United States	
Win	14–4	Fard Muhammad	TKO (punches)	SMASH Global 8	December 13, 2018	2	1:55	Los Angeles, California, United States	Won the vacant SMASH Global Featherweight Championship.
Loss	13–4	Julian Erosa	KO (head kick and punches)	Dana White's Contender Series 11	June 26, 2018	2	1:10	Las Vegas, Nevada, United States	
Win	13–3	Guilherme Faria de Souza	TKO (punches)	LFA 36	March 23, 2018	3	1:18	Cabazon, California, United States	
Win	12–3	Chris Avila	Decision (unanimous)	Global Knockout 11	November 4, 2017	3	5:00	Jackson, California, United States	Catchweight (150 lb) bout.
Win	11–3	Cory Sandhagen	Decision (unanimous)	LFA 5	February 24, 2017	3	5:00	Broomfield, Colorado, United States	
Win	10–3	Rivaldo Junior	Decision (unanimous)	RFA 41	July 29, 2016	3	5:00	San Antonio, Texas, United States	Return to Featherweight; Emmers missed weight (149 lb).
Loss	9–3	Thiago Moisés	TKO (punches)	RFA 38	June 3, 2016	5	2:52	Costa Mesa, California, United States	Lightweight debut. For the RFA Lightweight Championship.
Win	9–2	Ray Cervera	Decision (unanimous)	Tachi Palace Fights 25	November 19, 2015	3	5:00	Lemoore, California, United States	Catchweight (150 lb) bout.
Win	8–2	Merwyn Rivera	Submission (rear-naked choke)	Tachi Palace Fights 23	May 7, 2015	1	0:34	Lemoore, California, United States	
Loss	7–2	Rey Trujillo	Submission (triangle choke)	Hero FC: Best of the Best 4	January 17, 2015	2	1:48	Brownsville, Texas, United States	Lost the Hero FC Featherweight Championship.
Win	7–1	Michael Rodriguez	TKO (punches)	Hero FC: Best of the Best 3	September 12, 2014	1	0:27	Brownsville, Texas, United States	Defended the Hero FC Featherweight Championship.
Win	6–1	Chris Pecero	TKO (punches)	Hero FC: Best of the Best 2	June 14, 2014	3	3:39	Brownsville, Texas, United States	Defended the Hero FC Featherweight Championship.
Win	5–1	Brett Ewing	Decision (unanimous)	Hero FC: Best of the Best 1	February 1, 2014	3	5:00	Harlingen, Texas, United States	Won the vacant Hero FC Featherweight Championship.
Win	4–1	Brett Ewing	TKO (punches)	Hero FC: Texas Pride	September 28, 2013	2	0:54	Beaumont, Texas, United States	
Win	3–1	Alexander Hernandez	Decision (split)	Hero FC: Pride of the Valley 2	June 21, 2013	3	5:00	Pharr, Texas, United States	
Win	2–1	Ernest de la Cruz	Decision (unanimous)	Legacy FC 17	February 1, 2013	3	5:00	San Antonio, Texas, United States	
Loss	1–1	Matt Mazurek	Decision (split)	ABG Promotions: Alamo Showdown 5	November 17, 2012	3	5:00	San Antonio, Texas, United States	Featherweight debut.
Win	1–0	James Gonzalez	Submission (rear-naked choke)	Big Dawg Promotions: In Cage I Trust 1	October 6, 2012	2	0:54	Texas City, Texas, United States	Catchweight (150 lb) bout.

== See also ==
- List of current UFC fighters
- List of Dana White's Contender Series alumni
- List of male mixed martial artists
