= Mixed martial arts cage =

MMA combat arena

Types of MMA combat areas

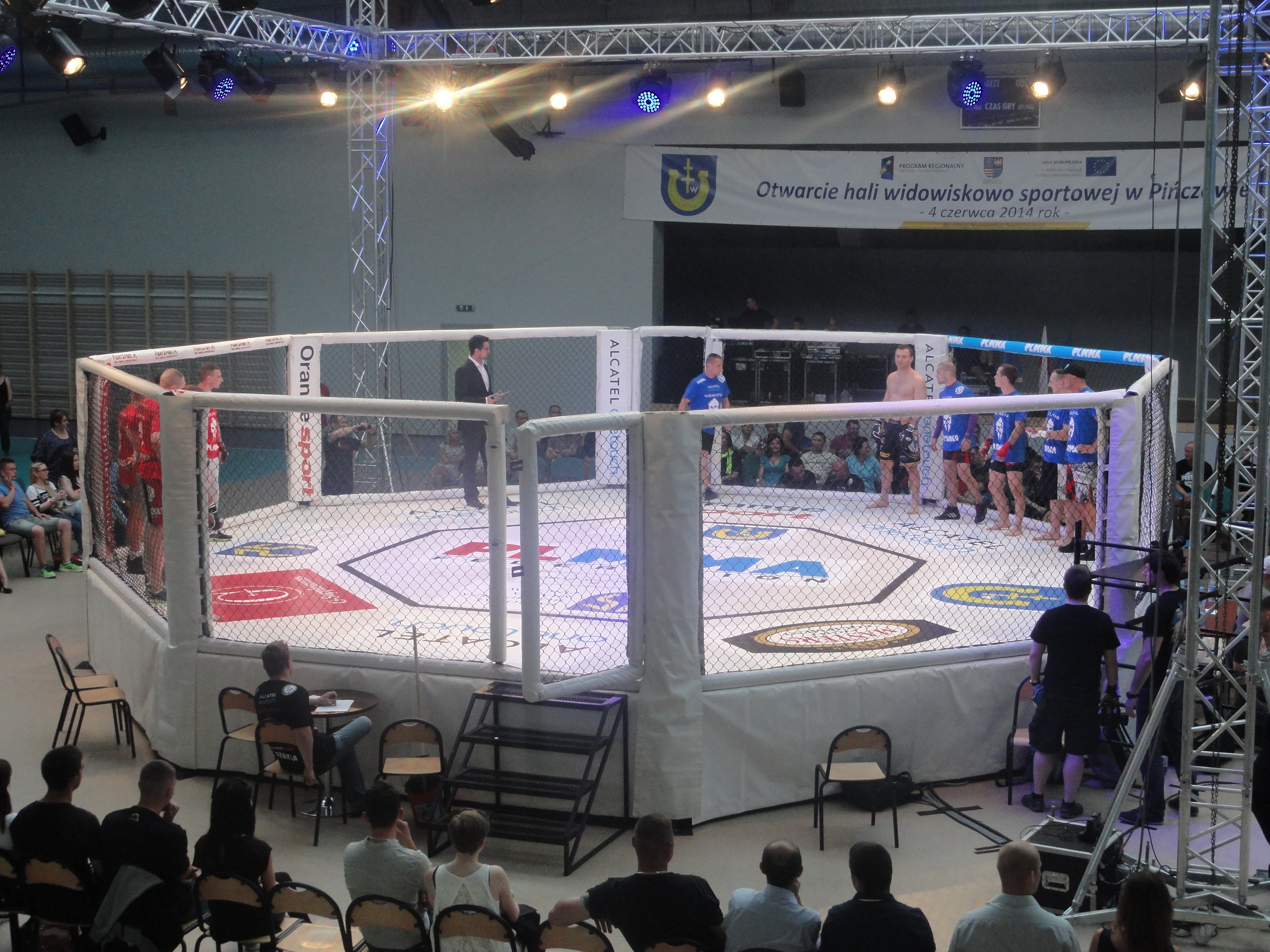
Octagonal cage

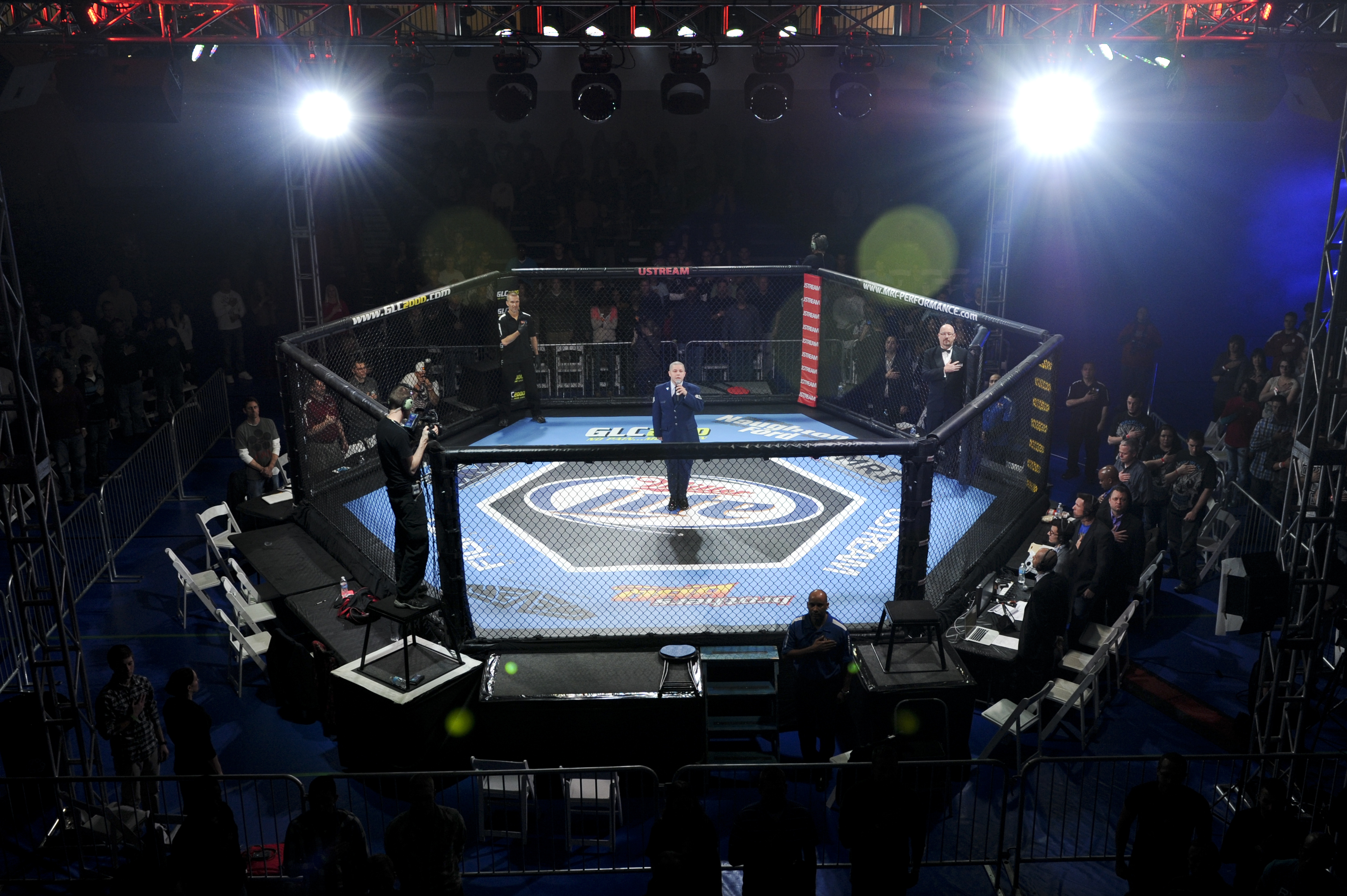
Hexagonal cage

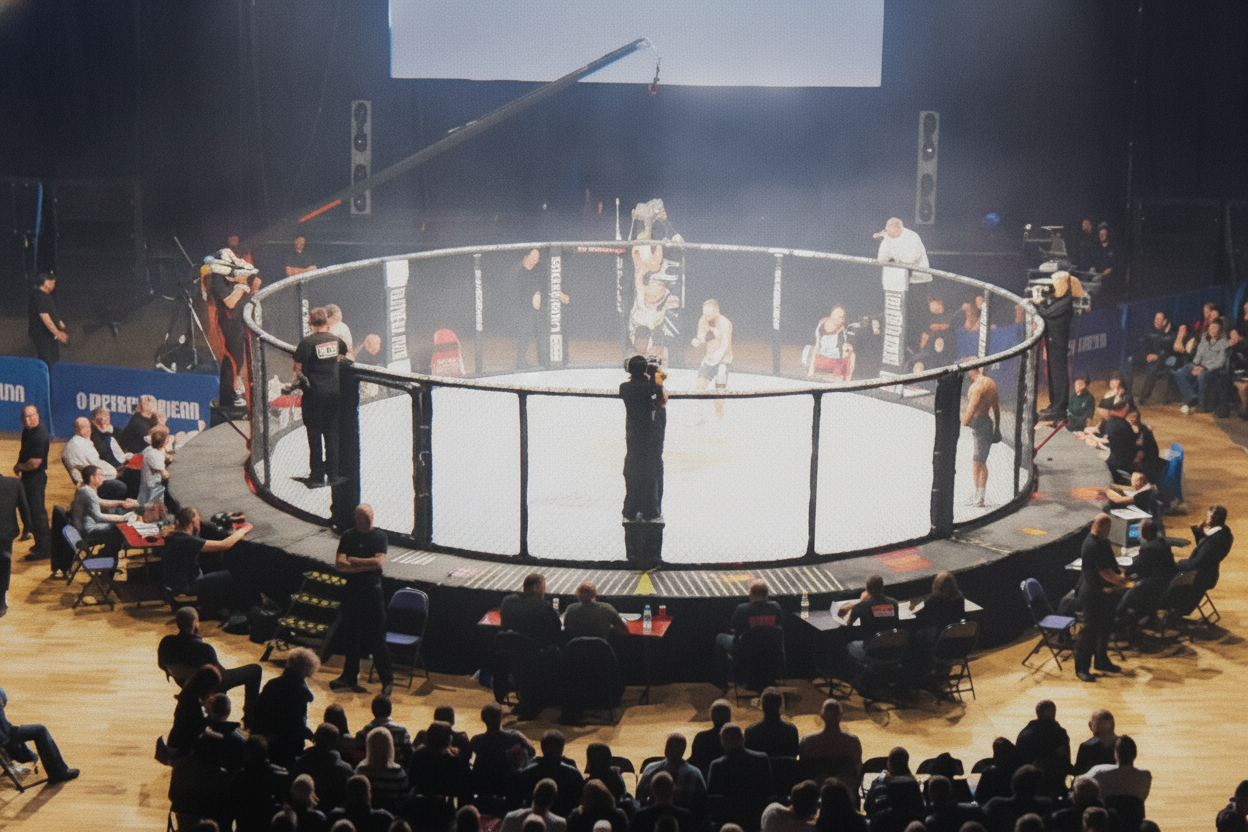
Circular cage

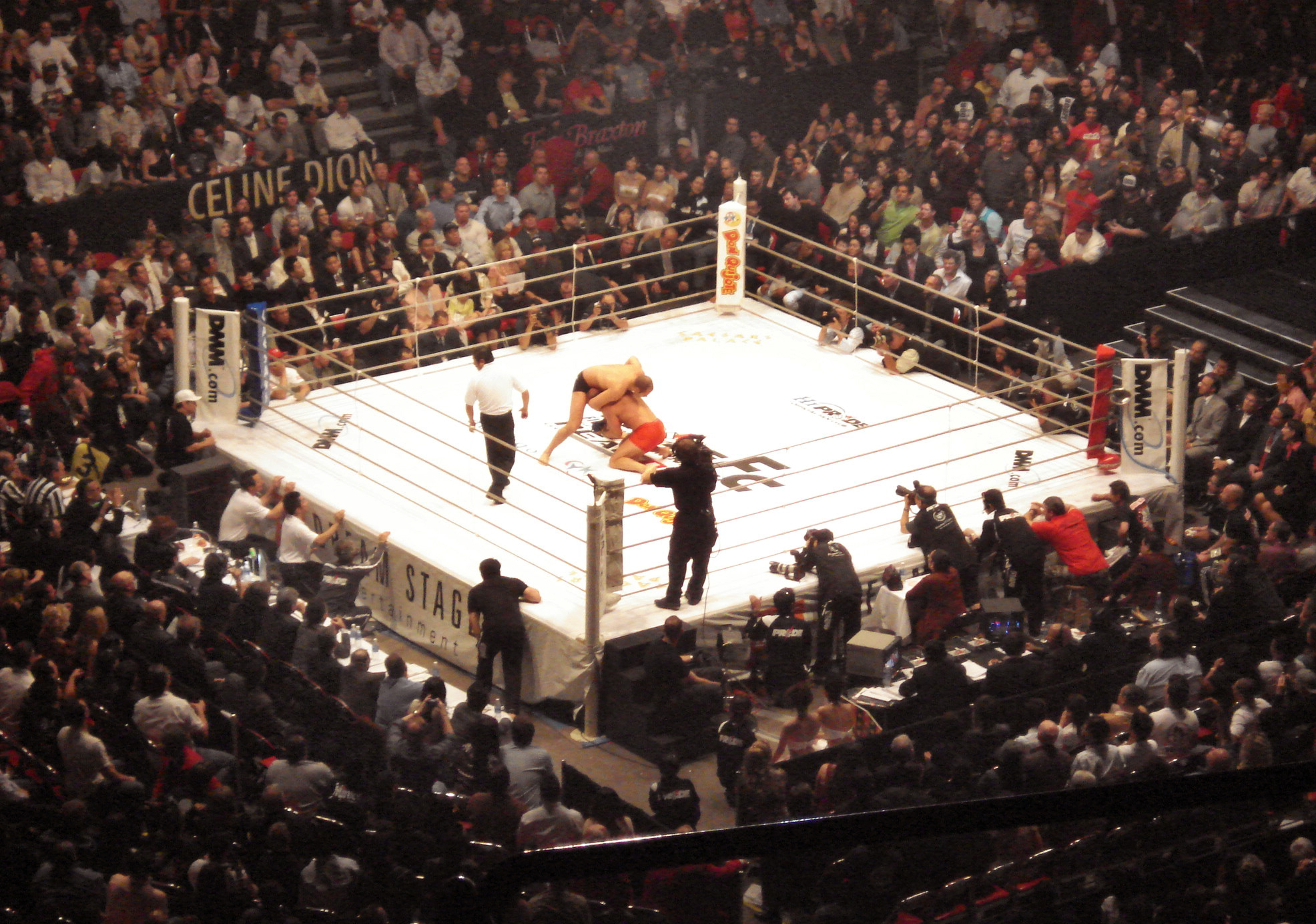
Ring

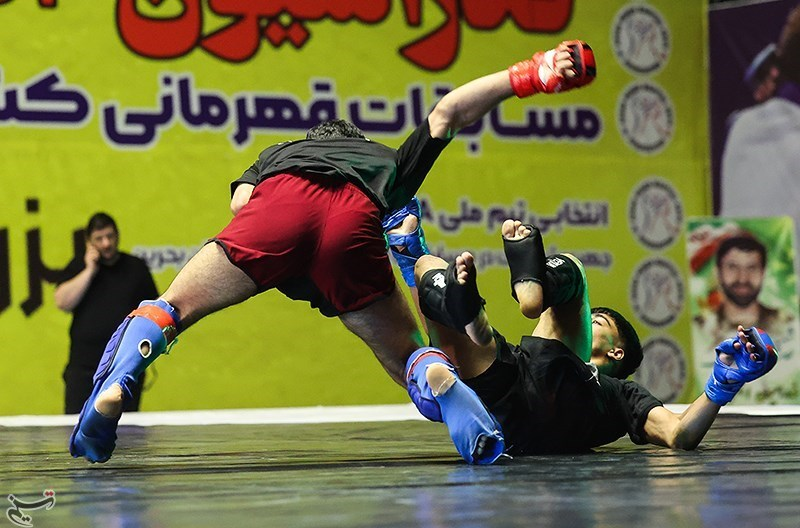
Open mat

Mixed martial arts cage is the typical combat area of most mixed martial arts (MMA) promotions.

According to the Unified Rules of Mixed Martial Arts, an MMA competition or exhibition may be held in a ring or a fenced area. The fenced area can be round or have at least six sides. Cages vary; some replace the metal fencing with a net, others have a different shape from an octagon, as the term "The Octagon" is trademarked by the UFC (although the 8-sided shape itself is not trademarked). The fenced area is called a cage generically, or a hexagon, an octagon or an octagon cage, depending on the shape.

On the contrary amateur MMA endorsed by United World Wrestling and Asian Mixed Martial Arts Association use open wrestling mat, instead. Global Association of Mixed Martial Arts uses both cage and open mat (tatami).

Also, some armored combat matches take place in cages.

== Ultimate Fighting Championship ==
The UFC stages bouts in an eight-sided enclosure officially named "The Octagon". Originally, SEG trademarked the concept as well as the term and prevented other mixed martial arts promotions from using the same type of cage, but in 2001 Zuffa gave permission for other promotions to use octagonal cages, reasoning that the young sport needed uniformity to continue to win official sanctioning. Today Zuffa reserves exclusive use of the name "The Octagon".

The UFC cage is an octagonal structure with walls of metal chain-link fence coated with black vinyl. The standard octagon has a diameter of 30 ft (9.1 m) with a 6 ft (1.8 m) high fence. The cage sits atop a platform, raising it 4 ft (1.2 m) from the ground. It has foam padding around the top of the fence and between each of the eight sections. It also has two entry-exit gates opposite each other. The mat (also referred to as the canvas), painted with sponsorship logos and art, is replaced for each event. For smaller venues and events, the UFC often uses a smaller cage, which is only 25 ft (7.6 m) across.
