= Felipe Lima (footballer) =

Brazilian footballer (born 1989)

Personal information
- Full name: Felipe Lima Lopes
- Date of birth: 2 February 1989 (age 37)
- Place of birth: Rio de Janeiro, Brazil
- Height: 1.81 m (5 ft 11 in)
- Position: Defensive midfielder

Youth career
- 2007–2009: CFZ
- 2009: → Botafogo (loan)

Senior career*
Years	Team	Apps	(Gls)
2009	CFZ		
2009–2013	Botafogo	1	(0)
2011	→ Duque de Caxias (loan)	0	(0)
2012	→ América-RJ (loan)		
2012	→ Bangu (loan)		
2013–2014	Tupi	15	(0)
2014	Sioni Bolnisi	4	(0)
2015	FC Amirani	5	(3)
2015–2017	Yeni Altındağ Belediyespor		
- * Club domestic league appearances and goals

Felipe Lima Lopes, or just Felipe Lima, (born 2 February 1989) is a Brazilian former professional footballer who played as a midfielder.
