= Felipe Lima (fighter) =

Brazilian mixed martial artist

- Born: May 7, 1998 (age 28); Coari, Amazonas, Brazil
- Height: 5 ft 6 in (1.68 m)
- Weight: 145 lb (66 kg; 10 st 5 lb)
- Division: Featherweight; Bantamweight
- Reach: 68 in (173 cm)
- Team: Allstars Training Center
- Years active: 2015–present

Mixed martial arts record
- Total: 17
- Wins: 15
- By knockout: 4
- By submission: 3
- By decision: 8
- Losses: 2
- By submission: 1
- By decision: 1

Other information
- Mixed martial arts record from Sherdog

Felipe Lima (born May 7, 1998) is a Brazilian mixed martial artist. He currently competes in the Bantamweight division of the Ultimate Fighting Championship. He previously competed in Brave Combat Federation and Oktagon MMA, where he is a former Oktagon Bantamweight Champion.

== Early life and background ==
Born and raised in Coari, a remote city in the Amazonas region of Brazil, Lima began training in Brazilian jiu-jitsu before transitioning to mixed martial arts. After facing visa issues in his home country, he moved to Sweden and joined the Allstars Training Center, where he adapted to European MMA culture.

== Mixed martial arts career ==
=== Early career ===
Felipe Lima amassed a record of 11-1 competing in his native Brazil and his adopted country of Sweden competing for promotions such as Fight Club Rush and Brave Combat Federation.

=== Oktagon MMA ===
In his promotional debut, Lima stepped in for Antun Račić to face Jonas Mågård for the Oktagon Bantamweight Championship on July 28, 2023, at Oktagon 45 Special. Despite being deducted one point due to an illegal knee, Lima won the fight via unanimous decision.

The rematch between Lima and Mågård for the Oktagon Bantamweight Championship was scheduled for July 20, 2024, at Oktagon 59. However, Lima was signed to UFC and was subsequently replaced by Josh Hill.

=== Ultimate Fighting Championship ===
Lima made his UFC debut replacing Melsik Baghdasaryan to face Muhammad Naimov at UFC on ABC 6 on June 22, 2024. He won the fight by a rear-naked choke submission in the third round. This fight earned him a Performance of the Night bonus.

Lima was scheduled to face Taylor Lapilus on September 28, 2024, at UFC Fight Night 243. However, Lima withdrew from the fight for unknown reasons and was replaced by Vince Morales.

Lima next faced Miles Johns on December 14, 2024, at UFC on ESPN 63. He won the fight via unanimous decision.

Lima faced Payton Talbott on June 28, 2025, at UFC 317. He lost the fight by unanimous decision.

Lima was scheduled to face Daniel Marcos on November 22, 2025, at UFC Fight Night 265. However, Lima withdrew due to a back injury and Marcos was re-scheduled to face a new opponent two weeks prior.

Returning to the featherweight division, Lima faced Morgan Charrière on September 5, 2026 at UFC Fight Night 287. He won the fight by unanimous decision.

== Championships and accomplishments ==
- Ultimate Fighting Championship
  - Performance of the Night (One time) vs. Muhammad Naimov
- Oktagon MMA
  - Oktagon Bantamweight Championship (One time)
- Fight Club Rush
  - FCR Bantamweight Championship (One time)
- Amazon Talent
  - Amazon Talent Bantamweight Championship (One time)

== Mixed martial arts record ==
Professional record breakdown
17 matches	15 wins	2 losses
By knockout	4	0
By submission	3	1
By decision	8	1

Res.	Record	Opponent	Method	Event	Date	Round	Time	Location	Notes
Win	15–2	Morgan Charrière	Decision (unanimous)	UFC Fight Night: Hooker vs. Parnasse	September 5, 2026	3	5:00	Paris, France	
Loss	14–2	Payton Talbott	Decision (unanimous)	UFC 317	June 28, 2025	3	5:00	Las Vegas, Nevada, United States	Bantamweight bout.
Win	14–1	Miles Johns	Decision (unanimous)	UFC on ESPN: Covington vs. Buckley	December 14, 2024	3	5:00	Tampa, Florida, United States	
Win	13–1	Muhammad Naimov	Submission (rear-naked choke)	UFC on ABC: Whittaker vs. Aliskerov	June 22, 2024	3	1:15	Riyadh, Saudi Arabia	Featherweight debut. Performance of the Night.
Win	12–1	Jonas Mågård	Decision (unanimous)	Oktagon 45 Special	July 28, 2023	5	5:00	Prague, Czech Republic	Won the Oktagon Bantamweight Championship. Lima was deducted one point in round 4 due to illegal knees.
Win	11–1	Evgeniy Odnorog	KO (flying knee)	Fight Club Rush 10	November 20, 2021	1	0:35	Västerås, Sweden	Won the inaugural FCR Bantamweight Championship.
Win	10–1	Fernando Flores	Decision (unanimous)	Fight Club Rush 8	March 6, 2021	3	5:00	Västerås, Sweden	Catchweight (141 lb) bout.
Win	9–1	Farbod Iran Nezhad	Decision (unanimous)	Brave CF 39	August 15, 2020	3	5:00	Stockholm, Sweden	Catchweight (141 lb) bout.
Win	8–1	Gustavo Oliveira	Decision (unanimous)	Mr. Cage 39	October 13, 2019	3	5:00	Maia, Portugal	
Win	7–1	Eurides Bandeira	TKO (retirement)	Amazon Talent 10	December 5, 2018	3	3:40	Manaus, Brazil	Won the vacant Amazon Talent Bantamweight Championship.
Win	6–1	Adalberto Mota da Silva Jr.	TKO (punches)	Arena Fight Championship 4	June 30, 2018	1	0:43	Coari, Brazil	Bantamweight debut.
Win	5–1	Admilson Pimentel	KO (punch)	Amazon Talent 8	March 10, 2018	1	1:38	Manaus, Brazil	
Win	4–1	Sebastiao da Silva Calixto	Decision (unanimous)	Rei da Selva Combat 10	November 11, 2017	3	5:00	Manaus, Brazil	
Win	3–1	Isaias Monteiro da Silva	Decision (unanimous)	Arena Fight Championship 3	July 29, 2017	3	5:00	Coari, Brazil	
Win	2–1	Dionatan Carvalho	Submission (armbar)	Amazon Talent 7	March 4, 2017	1	2:33	Manaus, Brazil	
Win	1–1	Tiago Santos	Submission (rear-naked choke)	Amazon Talent 3	October 29, 2015	1	3:25	Manaus, Brazil	
Loss	0–1	Ivan Luiz	Submission (triangle choke)	EnerGym Fight 1	August 8, 2015	1	N/A	Manaus, Brazil	Flyweight debut.

== See also ==
- List of current UFC fighters
- List of male mixed martial artists
