= David Zawada =

German mixed martial arts fighter

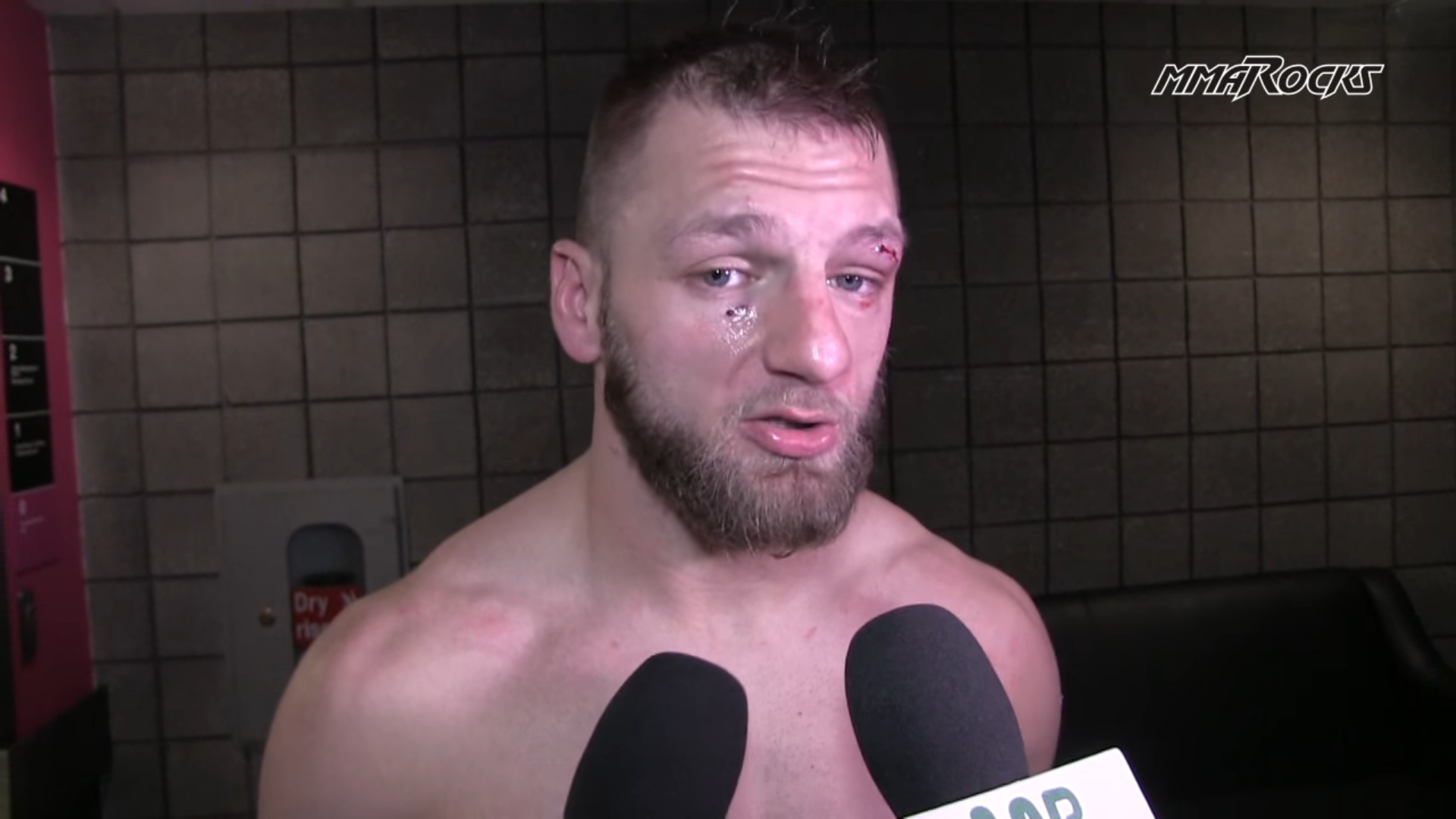
- Born: 1 August 1990 (age 36); Düsseldorf, West Germany
- Other names: Sagat
- Height: 6 ft 0 in (1.83 m)
- Weight: 170 lb (77 kg; 12 st 2 lb)
- Division: Welterweight
- Reach: 75 in (1.91 m)
- Fighting out of: Düsseldorf, Germany
- Team: UFD Gym; More Power Concepte
- Trainer: Christian Mohr (strength and conditioning)
- Years active: 2010–present

Mixed martial arts record
- Total: 33
- Wins: 20
- By knockout: 12
- By submission: 5
- By decision: 3
- Losses: 13
- By knockout: 6
- By submission: 1
- By decision: 6

Other information
- Mixed martial arts record from Sherdog

David Zawada (born 1 August 1990) is a German mixed martial artist currently competing in the Middleweight division of the Oktagon MMA. A professional since 2010, he has formerly competed for the Ultimate Fighting Championship (UFC), Konfrontacja Sztuk Walki (KSW), and Respect FC where he is the former Welterweight Champion.

== Background ==
Zawada trains at UFD Gym in Düsseldorf where he trains alongside Roberto Soldić, Erko Jun, Antun Racic and his brother, Martin Zawada.

== Mixed martial arts career ==
=== Early career ===
Zawada participated in various regional MMA promotions, notable in KSW primarily in the Europe. He was the former welterweight Respect Fighting Championship and Shooto Kings champion. He amassed a record of 16–3 prior to signing with the Ultimate Fighting Championship (UFC).

=== Ultimate Fighting Championship ===
Zawada made his UFC debut on July 22, 2018, against Danny Roberts, replacing injured Alan Jouban at UFC Fight Night: Shogun vs. Smith. He lost the fight via split decision. This fight earned him the Fight of the Night award.

His next faced Li Jingliang on November 24, 2018, replacing Elizeu Zaleski dos Santos at UFC Fight Night: Blaydes vs. Ngannou 2. He lost the fight via technical knockout in round three.

Zawada faced Abubakar Nurmagomedov on November 9, 2019 at UFC on ESPN+ 21. He won the fight via a submission in round one. This fight earned him the Performance of the Night award.

Zawada was scheduled to face Anthony Rocco Martin on April 25, 2020. However, on April 9, the promotion indicated that the pairing was scrapped due to the COVID-19 pandemic.

Zawada was expected to face Mounir Lazzez on October 18, 2020 at UFC Fight Night 180. However, on October 6, 2020 it was reported that Lazzez tested positive for COVID-19 and was removed from the bout. It is unclear at the stage if a replacement would be sought by the UFC officials.

Zawada faced Ramazan Emeev on January 16, 2021 at UFC on ABC 1. He lost a close fight by split decision.

Zawada was scheduled to face Sergey Khandozhko on September 4, 2021 at UFC Fight Night 191. However, the week before the event, Khandozhko was pulled from the contest for unknown reasons and replaced by Alex Morono. Zawada lost the fight via unanimous decision.

On February 10, 2022, it was announced that Zawada was no longer on the UFC roster.

=== Professional Fighters League ===
Zawada made his first appearance after his UFC release against Erhan Kartal on June 4, 2022 at Oktagon 33. He won the bout via doctor stoppage after the first round.

Zawada faced Carlos Leal on April 14, 2023 at PFL 3. He lost the bout in the first round via TKO stoppage.

Zawada faced Magomed Magomedkerimov on June 23, 2023 at PFL 6. He lost the fight via TKO in the first round.

=== Oktagon MMA ===
Zawada returned to Oktagon MMA on February 10, 2024 at Oktagon 53, defeating Hojat Khajevand in his Middleweight debut via heel hook at the end of the third round after being down on the scorecards for the bout.

Zawada faced Marek Mazuch on June 8, 2024 at Oktagon 58, losing via knockout early in the first round.

== Championships and accomplishments ==
=== Mixed martial arts ===
- Ultimate Fighting Championship
  - Performance of the Night (One time) vs. Abubakar Nurmagomedov
  - Fight of the Night (One time) vs. Danny Roberts
  - UFC.com Awards
    - 2019: Ranked #10 Submission of the Year vs. Abubakar Nurmagomedov
- MMAJunkie.com
  - 2019 November Submission of the Month vs. Abubakar Nurmagomedov
- Respect Fighting Championship
  - 2016 Respect FC welterweight champion
- Shooto Kings
  - 2016 Shooto Kings welterweight champion

== Personal life ==
Zawada older brother, Martin Zawada, is also a MMA fighter for the Konfrontacja Sztuk Walki promotion.

== Mixed martial arts record ==
Professional record breakdown
33 matches	20 wins	13 losses
By knockout	12	6
By submission	5	1
By decision	3	6

Res.	Record	Opponent	Method	Event	Date	Round	Time	Location	Notes
Loss	20–13	David Kozma	Decision (unanimous)	Oktagon 92	August 1, 2026	3	5:00	Prague, Czech Republic	
Win	20–12	Daniel Ligocki	Decision (split)	Oktagon 82	January 17, 2026	3	5:00	Düsseldorf, Germany	Catchweight (187 lb) bout; Ligocki missed weight. Performance of the Night.
Loss	19–12	Kamil Oniszczuk	Decision (unanimous)	Oktagon 74	August 9, 2025	3	5:00	Prague, Czech Republic	Oktagon Middleweight Tournament Reserve bout.
Loss	19–11	Matěj Peňáz	TKO (knee and punches)	Oktagon 66	February 1, 2025	1	4:42	Düsseldorf, Germany	Oktagon Middleweight Tournament Round of 16.
Loss	19–10	Marek Mazúch	KO (punches)	Oktagon 58	June 8, 2024	1	1:15	Prague, Czech Republic	
Win	19–9	Hojat Khajevand	Submission (heel hook)	Oktagon 53	February 10, 2024	3	4:24	Oberhausen, Germany	Middleweight debut.
Loss	18–9	Magomed Magomedkerimov	TKO (punches)	PFL 6 (2023)	June 23, 2023	1	3:54	Atlanta, Georgia, United States	
Loss	18–8	Carlos Leal	TKO (punches)	PFL 3 (2023)	April 14, 2023	1	2:25	Las Vegas, Nevada, United States	
Win	18–7	Erhan Kartal	TKO (doctor stoppage)	Oktagon 33	June 4, 2022	1	5:00	Frankfurt, Germany	
Loss	17–7	Alex Morono	Decision (unanimous)	UFC Fight Night: Brunson vs. Till	September 4, 2021	3	5:00	Las Vegas, Nevada, United States	
Loss	17–6	Ramazan Emeev	Decision (split)	UFC on ABC: Holloway vs. Kattar	January 16, 2021	3	5:00	Abu Dhabi, United Arab Emirates	
Win	17–5	Abubakar Nurmagomedov	Submission (triangle choke)	UFC Fight Night: Magomedsharipov vs. Kattar	November 9, 2019	1	2:50	Moscow, Russia	Performance of the Night.
Loss	16–5	Li Jingliang	KO (body kick)	UFC Fight Night: Blaydes vs. Ngannou 2	November 24, 2018	3	4:07	Beijing, China	
Loss	16–4	Danny Roberts	Decision (split)	UFC Fight Night: Shogun vs. Smith	July 22, 2018	3	5:00	Hamburg, Germany	Fight of the Night.
Win	16–3	Michał Michalski	Submission (rear-naked choke)	KSW 43	April 14, 2018	3	0:48	Wrocław, Poland	Fight of the Night.
Win	15–3	Maciej Jewtuszko	Decision (unsnimous)	KSW 40	October 22, 2017	3	5:00	Dublin, Ireland	Fight of the Night.
Win	14–3	Andreas Ståhl	TKO (punches)	German MMA Championship 11	April 22, 2017	1	1:24	Castrop-Rauxel, Germany	
Win	13–3	Robert Radomski	TKO (punches)	KSW 37	December 3, 2016	1	1:24	Kraków, Poland	
Win	12–3	Stefan Larisch	KO (punches)	Respect FC 16	April 9, 2016	1	0:30	Cologne, Germany	Won the Respect FC Welterweight Championship.
Loss	11–3	Kamil Szymuszowski	Decision (split)	KSW 33	July 7, 2015	3	5:00	Kraków, Poland	
Win	11–2	Stefan Sekulić	TKO (punches)	Serbian Battle Championship 6	September 19, 2015	2	2:24	Vojvodina, Serbia	
Win	10–2	Aldin Osmančević	TKO (punches)	Montenegro FC 3	July 27, 2015	1	0:47	Budva, Montenegro	
Loss	9–2	Borys Mańkowski	Submission (arm-triangle choke)	KSW 29	July 7, 2014	1	1:20	Kraków, Poland	For the KSW Welterweight Championship.
Win	9–1	Sebastian Risch	TKO (doctor stoppage)	German MMA Championship 5	September 13, 2014	1	2:39	Castrop-Rauxel, Germany	
Win	8–1	Luca Vitali	KO (punch)	Swiss MMA Championship 1	December 1, 2013	2	0:48	Basel, Switzerland	
Loss	7–1	Djamil Chan	KO (knees)	Respect FC 9	July 7, 2013	1	1:34	Dormagen, Germany	For the Respect FC Welterweight Championship.
Win	7–0	Kerim Engizek	Decision (majority)	Superior FC 11	September 15, 2012	3	5:00	Düren, Germany	
Win	6–0	Egny Borges	Submission (guillotine choke)	Superior FC 10	June 2, 2012	1	1:04	Mainz, Germany	
Win	5–0	Garcia Chambe	TKO (corner stoppage)	Superior FC 9	March 31, 2012	1	4:37	Göppingen, Germany	
Win	4–0	Maurice Skrober	TKO (corner stoppage)	Superior FC 8	February 4, 2012	1	4:50	Mainz, Germany	
Win	3–0	Florian Ziebert	KO (flying knee and punches)	Respect FC 5	April 9, 2011	2	0:21	Essen, Germany	
Win	2–0	Nerijus Slepetis	Submission (guillotine choke)	German MMA Association 7	April 3, 2011	1	4:27	Düsseldorf, Germany	
Win	1–0	Michael Zabrocki	TKO (punches)	German MMA Association 6	July 7, 2010	1	2:34	Düsseldorf, Germany	

== See also ==
- List of male mixed martial artists
