= Luigi Vendramini =

Brazilian mixed martial arts fighter

- Born: January 16, 1996 (age 30); Brasília, Federal District, Brazil
- Other names: The Italian Stallion
- Height: 5 ft 8 in (1.73 m)
- Weight: 155.0 lb (70.3 kg; 11.07 st)
- Division: Lightweight
- Reach: 73 in (185 cm)
- Team: Constrictor Team; Factory X Team Alpha Male
- Rank: Black belt in Brazilian jiu-jitsu
- Years active: 2016–present

Mixed martial arts record
- Total: 16
- Wins: 13
- By knockout: 7
- By submission: 6
- Losses: 3
- By knockout: 2
- By decision: 1

Other information
- Mixed martial arts record from Sherdog

Luigi Vendramini (born January 16, 1996) is a Brazilian professional male mixed martial artist who competed in the Lightweight division of the Ultimate Fighting Championship.

== Background ==
Vendramini started practising Brazilian jiu-jitsu at the age of 12 to lose weight, transitioning to mixed martial arts a year later. His father Augusto is a Brazilian jiu-jitsu black belt, and he put Vendramini on the path to becoming a fighter, remaining his trainer to this day.

A native of Brazil, Vendramini also owns Italian and Swiss passports through his father and mother, respectively.

Being away from the cage for 758 days after his UFC debut, and unable to get paid for his work as a fighter, Vendramini decided to help his family business in the meantime. His parents are mushroom producers and have run a bakery in Brasilia for half a century.

== Mixed martial arts career ==
=== Early career ===
Starting his professional career in 2016, Vendramini compiled an undefeated 8–0 record on the regional Brazilian scene, winning all 8 bouts via stoppage.

=== Ultimate Fighting Championship ===
Vendramini, as a replacement for Belal Muhammad, moved up in weight and faced Elizeu Zaleski dos Santos on a weeks notice on September 22, 2018, at UFC Fight Night: Santos vs. Anders. He lost the fight via knockout in round two.

Vendramini suffered an injury – a tear in the knee ligament – which he felt in the first round left “The Italian Stallion” about seven months away from training. After the inactive period, Vendramini was scheduled to face Nick Hein on June 1, 2019, at UFC on ESPN+ 11. However, Vendramini pulled out of the bout in late April citing a new tear in the same knee and subsequent surgery, which left him unable to compete for eight months.

Following the second surgery, the doctor said that the first surgeon did the wrong surgery, meaning that he lost a year of his career due to a medical error.

Vendramini made his sophomore appearance in the organization against Jessin Ayari on October 4, 2020, at UFC on ESPN: Holm vs. Aldana. He won the fight via technical knockout in round one. This win earned him the Performance of the Night bonus.

Vendramini faced Farès Ziam on June 12, 2021, at UFC 263. He lost the fight via majority decision.

Vendramini faced Paddy Pimblett on September 4, 2021, at UFC Fight Night 191. He lost the fight via knockout in round one.

In May 2022 it was reported that Vendramini was released by UFC.

=== Post UFC ===
Vendramini faced Leomir Nascimento for the inaugural SC Vacant Welterweight Championship at "Soldado Combat 3" on August 24, 2024 and won the championship by first round technical knockout.

== Championships and accomplishments ==
=== Mixed martial arts ===
- Ultimate Fighting Championship
  - Performance of the Night (One Time) vs. Jessin Ayari
- Soldado Combat
  - SC Welterweight Championship (One time, current)

== Mixed martial arts record ==
Professional record breakdown
16 matches	13 wins	3 losses
By knockout	7	2
By submission	6	0
By decision	0	1

Res.	Record	Opponent	Method	Event	Date	Round	Time	Location	Notes
Win	13–3	Marcelo Romero	Submission (rear-naked choke)	BSB Fight 1	July 26, 2025	1	2:17	Brasília, Brazil	Return to Lightweight. Won the inaugural BSB Lightweight Championship.
Win	12–3	Marcelino Carvalho	TKO (punches)	MFC 81 Combat: In The House	February 1, 2025	1	0:12	Brasília, Brazil	
Win	11–3	Leomir Nascimento	TKO (punches)	Soldado Combat 3	August 24, 2024	1	2:54	Brasília, Brazil	Return to Welterweight. Won the inaugural SC Welterweight Championship.
Win	10–3	Arlindo Sena	Submission (buggy choke)	Clube Fight Show 001	August 17, 2024	1	1:54	Valparaiso de Goias, Brazil	Catchweight (161 lb) bout.
Loss	9–3	Paddy Pimblett	KO (punches)	UFC Fight Night: Brunson vs. Till	September 4, 2021	1	4:25	Las Vegas, Nevada, United States	
Loss	9–2	Farès Ziam	Decision (majority)	UFC 263	June 12, 2021	3	5:00	Glendale, Arizona, United States	
Win	9–1	Jessin Ayari	TKO (head kick and punches)	UFC on ESPN: Holm vs. Aldana	October 4, 2020	1	1:12	Abu Dhabi, United Arab Emirates	Return to Lightweight. Performance of the Night.
Loss	8–1	Elizeu Zaleski dos Santos	KO (flying knee and punches)	UFC Fight Night: Santos vs. Anders	September 22, 2018	2	1:20	São Paulo, Brazil	Welterweight debut.
Win	8–0	Lucas Eurico	TKO (punches)	Samurai Fight 1	September 7, 2018	1	3:57	Brasília, Brazil	
Win	7–0	Adriano Andre	TKO (punches)	Aspera FC 56	August 19, 2017	1	0:33	Brasília, Brazil	
Win	6–0	Geter Lírio	Submission (rear-naked choke)	The Warriors Combat 4	May 13, 2017	1	2:45	Brasília, Brazil	
Win	5–0	David Alan Silva	TKO (punches)	IFC MMA Combat 6	March 11, 2017	1	0:10	Ceres, Brazil	
Win	4–0	Robson Correira da Silva	Submission (anaconda choke)	Centro Oeste Fight 6	December 17, 2016	1	1:16	Brasília, Brazil	
Win	3–0	João Paulo	Submission (kimura)	Aspera FC 45	October 8, 2016	1	3:25	Brasília, Brazil	Lightweight debut.
Win	2–0	Odair Tarrafa	Submission (anaconda choke)	Centro Oeste Fight 5	July 1, 2016	1	1:40	Brasília, Brazil	
Win	1–0	Guilherme de Carvalho	TKO (punches)	Magal Fight 1	April 16, 2016	2	2:05	Alexânia, Brazil	Featherweight debut.

== See also ==
- List of male mixed martial artists
