= Jessin Ayari =

German mixed martial arts fighter

- Born: May 31, 1992 (age 34); Tunisia
- Other names: Abacus
- Nationality: German
- Height: 6 ft 0 in (1.83 m)
- Weight: 170.0 lb (77.1 kg; 12.14 st)
- Division: Welterweight
- Reach: 73 in (185 cm)
- Style: Sambo, Kickboxing, BJJ
- Fighting out of: Nuremberg, Germany
- Team: Hammers Team; Planet Eater; Phuket Top Team Original Fighting
- Years active: 2009–present

Mixed martial arts record
- Total: 26
- Wins: 19
- By knockout: 5
- By submission: 9
- By decision: 5
- Losses: 7
- By knockout: 3
- By submission: 1
- By decision: 3

Other information
- Notable relatives: Cousin - Khaled Ayari -footballer for Lokomotiv Plovdiv in the Bulgarian First League; Cousin - Hassine Ayari Tunisia Olympian in Greco-Roman wrestling Uncle - Omrane Ayari -Tunisia Olympian in Greco-Roman wrestling
- Mixed martial arts record from Sherdog

Jessin Ayari (born May 31, 1992) is a Tunisian-German professional mixed martial artist. He was the formal Superior Fighting Championship Welterweight Champion. and competed in welterweight division of Ultimate Fighting Championship (UFC).

== Background ==
Ayari started playing football when he was young, and played for TSV 1904 Feucht youth team as a defensive midfielder in Germany. He started training in MMA at the age of fifteen after becoming frustrated with his football teammates who did not pull their weight and give as much as him. Ayari soon transitioned to MMA and completed his first MMA fight two years later.

Since MMA gyms are hard to find in Germany, Ayari goes to different gyms to train in each specific combat sport discipline. A typical day for his training starts with strength and conditioning training at Power Athletics. In the evening, he either does boxing training at West End, BJJ training at Fight Gym, MMA sparring with Hammers Team or wrestling training at Johannis Grizzlys.

== Mixed martial arts career ==
=== Early career ===
Ayari made his professional MMA debut on October 17, 2009, at Bavaria, Germany, and he was the former Superior Fighting Championship Welterweight Champion. He had a six fight win streak with a victory win over former UFC fighter Mickael Lebout at GMC 8 in Castrop-Rauxel on April 16, 2016, with professional MMA record of 15–3 prior being signed by UFC.

=== Ultimate Fighting Championship ===
Ayari was expected to make his UFC debut against Emil Meek on September 3, 2016, at UFC Fight Night: Arlovski vs. Barnett in Hamburg, Germany. However, Meek was pulled from the fight due to a USADA conflict where receiving medical treatment of the fight against Rousimar Palhares prior to signing with the UFC and he was replaced by Jim Wallhead. Ayari won his first UFC fight via split decision.

He next faced Darren Till on May 28, 2017, at UFC Fight Night: Gustafsson vs. Teixeira. After three rounds of fighting, the judges handed down the win to Till via unanimous decision.

Ayari faced Stevie Ray in a lightweight bout on October 27, 2018, at UFC Fight Night 138 He lost the fight by controversial decision.

Returning from an extended hiatus, Ayari faced Luigi Vendramini on October 4, 2020, at UFC on ESPN 16. He lost the fight via technical knockout in round one.

It was announced that after his loss to Vendramini, he was released from the UFC.

== Championships and accomplishments ==
=== Mixed martial arts ===
- Superior Fighting Championship
  - Superior Fighting Championship Welterweight Champion (one time) vs. Kerim Engizek

=== Amateur Sambo Competition ===
- Bavarian Combat Sambo Championship
  - Bavarian Combat Sambo Champion

== Personal life ==
Ayari comes from a family of athletes; his cousin Khaled Ayari was a footballer for Lokomotiv Plovdiv in the Bulgarian First League, and another cousin Hassine Ayari and uncle Omrane Ayari represented Tunisia in Greco-Roman wrestling in the Olympics.

He worked as an automotive mechanic engineer prior to fighting professionally.

== Mixed martial arts record ==
Professional record breakdown
26 matches	19 wins	7 losses
By knockout	5	3
By submission	9	1
By decision	5	3

Res.	Record	Opponent	Method	Event	Date	Round	Time	Location	Notes
Loss	19–7	Amiran Gogoladze	Decision (unanimous)	Oktagon 95	October 30, 2026	5	5:00	Munich, Germany	For the vacant Oktagon Welterweight Championship.
Win	19–6	Niklas Stolze	Submission (rear-naked choke)	Oktagon 73	June 28, 2025	2	3:25	Hamburg, Germany	
Win	18–6	Andreas Stahl	TKO (punches)	Oktagon 68	March 8, 2025	3	4:01	Stuttgart, Germany	
Win	17–6	Ayub Gaziev	TKO (punches)	Innferno FC 8	June 15, 2024	2	3:20	Innsbruck, Austria	Return to Welterweight. Won the vacant Innferno FC Welterweight Championship.
Loss	16–6	Luigi Vendramini	TKO (head kick and punches)	UFC on ESPN: Holm vs. Aldana	October 4, 2020	1	1:12	Abu Dhabi, United Arab Emirates	
Loss	16–5	Stevie Ray	Decision (unanimous)	UFC Fight Night: Volkan vs. Smith	October 27, 2018	3	5:00	Moncton, New Brunswick, Canada	Lightweight debut.
Loss	16–4	Darren Till	Decision (unanimous)	UFC Fight Night: Gustafsson vs. Teixeira	May 28, 2017	3	5:00	Stockholm, Sweden	
Win	16–3	Jim Wallhead	Decision (split)	UFC Fight Night: Arlovski vs. Barnett	September 3, 2016	3	5:00	Hamburg, Germany	
Win	15–3	Mickaël Lebout	Decision (unanimous)	German MMA Championship 8	April 16, 2016	3	5:00	Castrop-Rauxel, Germany	
Win	14–3	Twan van Buuren	TKO (punches)	Respect FC: Caged 2	December 19, 2015	3	1:50	Karlsruhe, Germany	
Win	13–3	Stanislav Futera	Submission (rear-naked choke)	Innferno FC 1	June 13, 2015	1	3:22	Tyrol, Austria	
Win	12–3	Juan Manuel Suarez	Decision (Unanimous)	Ansgar Fighting League 2	March 14, 2015	3	5:00	Telde, Spain	
Win	11–3	Ramon Boixader	Submission (guillotine choke)	Ansgar Fighting League 2	November 29, 2014	1	4:56	Madrid, Spain	
Win	10–3	Roman Kapranov	Decision (unanimous)	Rhein Neckar Championship: Martial Arts Gala	November 30, 2013	3	5:00	Frankenthal, Germany	Middleweight bout.
Loss	9–3	Abusupiyan Magomedov	TKO (punches)	German MMA Championship 3	February 16, 2013	1	1:49	Herne, Germany	For the GMC Welterweight Championship.
Win	9–2	Kerim Engizek	Submission (rear-naked choke)	Superior FC: Tournament 2012 Part V	November 24, 2012	2	3:56	Manz, Germany	Won the vacant Superior FC Welterweight Championship.
Win	8–2	Aleksandar Rajacic	Decision (unanimous)	Superior FC: Tournament 2012 Part IV	September 15, 2012	3	5:00	Düren, Germany	
Loss	7–2	Alan Johnston	KO (punches)	On Top 5	June 2, 2012	2	2:52	Glasgow, Scotland	
Win	7–1	Matthias Merkle	Submission (rear-naked choke)	Superior FC: Tournament 2012 Part 2	March 31, 2012	1	2:09	Göppingen, Germany	
Win	6–1	Sebastian Baron	TKO (retirement)	Respect FC 6	September 17, 2011	1	5:00	Wuppertal, Germany	
Win	5–1	Volker Dietz	TKO (broken hand)	Respect FC 5	April 9, 2011	1	1:37	Essen, Germany	
Loss	4–1	Ruben Crawford	Submission (rear-naked choke)	Outsider Cup: Cage Fight Night 9	October 17, 2010	1	3:59	Bielefeld, Germany	
Win	4–0	Wahid Beisel	Submission (armbar)	Outsider Cup 19	July 10, 2010	1	1:58	Berlin, Germany	
Win	3–0	Arsan Tepsaev	Submission (triangle choke)	Outsider Cup 19	July 10, 2010	1	1:36	Berlin, Germany	
Win	2–0	Frank van Lessiel	Submission (arm-triangle choke)	Outsider Cup 15	November 14, 2009	1	3:06	Koblenz, Germany	
Win	1–0	Tobias Hollubetz	Submission (armbar)	Fighting Masters Championship 1	October 17, 2009	1	2:43	Bavaria, Germany	

== See also ==
- List of male mixed martial artists
