= Niklas Stolze =

German mixed martial arts fighter

- Born: December 28, 1992 (age 33); Schönebeck, Germany
- Other names: Green Mask
- Nationality: German
- Height: 6 ft 0 in (1.83 m)
- Weight: 155 lb (70 kg; 11 st 1 lb)
- Division: Lightweight; Welterweight
- Reach: 75.0 in (191 cm)
- Fighting out of: Magdeburg, Germany
- Team: La Onda Fight Club
- Years active: 2014–2026

Mixed martial arts record
- Total: 24
- Wins: 14
- By knockout: 6
- By submission: 5
- By decision: 3
- Losses: 10
- By knockout: 3
- By submission: 3
- By decision: 4

Other information
- Mixed martial arts record from Sherdog

Niklas Stolze (born December 28, 1992) is a German former mixed martial artist who competed in the Lightweight division. A professional since 2014, he most notably competed for the Ultimate Fighting Championship (UFC) and Oktagon MMA.

== Background ==
Stolze began his career in Combat Jiu-Jitsu at the age of 15, then switched to kickboxing two years later through his coach Sascha Poppendieck. But the goal was always MMA, deciding in 2014 to pursue a career as an MMA professional. On top of MMA, Stolze also completed training as a welder.

He is the first East German to be signed to the UFC.

== Mixed martial arts career ==
=== Early career ===
Stolze spent most of his pre-UFC career fighting on the European regional scene, compiling a 12–3 record, with two of his losses coming the way of unanimous decision at BAMMA, losing to Terry Brazier at BAMMA 27 and Chris Stringer at BAMMA 30.

=== Ultimate Fighting Championship ===
Stolze made his UFC debut, as a replacement for Shavkat Rakhmonov, against Ramazan Emeev on July 26, 2020, at UFC on ESPN: Whittaker vs. Till. Stolze lost the fight via unanimous decision.

Stolze was scheduled to face Mounir Lazzez on July 31, 2021, at UFC on ESPN: Hall vs. Strickland. However, Lazzez pulled out just a few days before the event due to visa issues and was replaced by Jared Gooden. He lost the fight via knockout in round one.

Stolze faced Benoît Saint-Denis on June 4, 2022, at UFC Fight Night: Volkov vs. Rozenstruik. Stolze lost the bout after getting submitted in the second round.

On June 9, 2022, it was announced that Stolze was released from the UFC.

=== Oktagon MMA ===
Stolze faced Andrej Kalašnik on November 18, 2023, at Oktagon 49, winning the bout via first-round knockout.

In his sophomore performance, Stolze faced Máté Kertész on Marc 23, 2024 at Oktagon 55, being submitted in the second round via rear-naked choke.

Stolze faced Matouš Kohout on September 7, 2024, at Oktagon 60, winning the bout via flying knee TKO in the first round.

== Mixed martial arts record ==
Professional record breakdown
24 matches	14 wins	10 losses
By knockout	6	3
By submission	5	3
By decision	3	4

Res.	Record	Opponent	Method	Event	Date	Round	Time	Location	Notes
Loss	14–10	Tyrone Pfeifer	TKO (punches)	Oktagon 90	June 20, 2026	1	0:22	Berlin, Germany	
Loss	14–9	Christian Jungwirth	TKO (punches)	Oktagon 80	November 22, 2025	4	4:19	Munich, Germany	
Loss	14–8	Jessin Ayari	Submission (rear-naked choke)	Oktagon 73	June 28, 2025	2	3:25	Hamburg, Germany	
Win	14–7	Matouš Kohout	TKO (flying knee and punches)	Oktagon 60	September 7, 2024	1	2:04	Oberhausen, Germany	Performance of the Night.
Loss	13–7	Máté Kertész	Submission (rear-naked choke)	Oktagon 55	March 23, 2024	2	2:42	Stuttgart, Germany	
Win	13–6	Andrej Kalašnik	KO (punches)	Oktagon 49	November 18, 2023	1	3:40	Cologne, Germany	
Loss	12–6	Benoît Saint-Denis	Submission (rear-naked choke)	UFC Fight Night: Volkov vs. Rozenstruik	June 4, 2022	2	1:32	Las Vegas, Nevada, United States	Lightweight bout.
Loss	12–5	Jared Gooden	KO (punch)	UFC on ESPN: Hall vs. Strickland	July 31, 2021	1	1:08	Las Vegas, Nevada, United States	
Loss	12–4	Ramazan Emeev	Decision (unanimous)	UFC on ESPN: Whittaker vs. Till	July 26, 2020	3	5:00	Abu Dhabi, United Arab Emirates	
Win	12–3	Omar Jesus Santana	Decision (unanimous)	Nova FC 1	April 13, 2019	3	5:00	Balingen, Germany	
Win	11–3	Christian Draxler	TKO (punches)	Cage Fight Series 9	February 2, 2019	1	3:43	Graz, Austria	
Win	10–3	Jan Janka	Submission (rear-naked choke)	Oktagon 7	July 28, 2018	2	3:32	Prague, Czech Republic	
Win	9–3	Johannes Michalik	Submission (rear-naked choke)	Hype FC 8	May 12, 2018	1	2:47	Bremen, Germany	Return to Welterweight.
Loss	8–3	Chris Stringer	Decision (unanimous)	BAMMA 30	July 7, 2017	3	5:00	Dublin, Ireland	
Win	8–2	Mahmod Faour	Decision (unanimous)	Magdeburger Cage 1	April 1, 2017	3	5:00	Magdeburg, Germany	Lightweight debut.
Loss	7–2	Terry Brazier	Decision (unanimous)	BAMMA 27	December 16, 2016	3	5:00	Dublin, Ireland	
Win	7–1	Maxime Vanelstraete	Submission (rear-naked choke)	Imperium FC 5	August 27, 2016	2	3:25	Leipzig, Germany	
Win	6–1	Johannes Grebe	Submission (armbar)	Superior FC 14	May 21, 2016	1	2:32	Düren, Germany	
Win	5–1	Rastislav Hanulay	Decision (unanimous)	Imperium FC 4	March 26, 2016	2	5:00	Leipzig, Germany	
Win	4–1	Florent Conte	TKO (punches)	Imperium FC 3	October 10, 2015	2	4:39	Leipzig, Germany	
Loss	3–1	Sebastian Reimitz	Decision (split)	Ravage Series: Finest MMA	August 29, 2015	3	5:00	Hamburg, Germany	
Win	3–0	Max Rose	KO (head kick)	Imperium FC 2	April 4, 2015	1	1:28	Leipzig, Germany	
Win	2–0	Nils Fischer	Submission (guillotine choke)	La Onda Fight Club: MMA Gladiators	March 15, 2015	1	0:50	Magdeburg, Germany	Catchweight (176 lb) bout.
Win	1–0	Lauris Leitans	TKO (punches)	Imperium FC 1	June 1, 2014	1	1:48	Leipzig, Germany	Welterweight debut.

== See also ==
- List of male mixed martial artists
