= 2025 in Oktagon MMA =

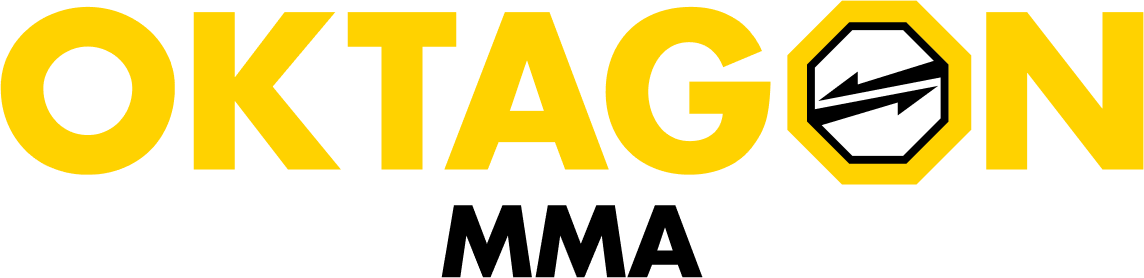

Information
- First date: February 1, 2025
- Last date: December 28, 2025

Events
- Total events: 16

Fights
- Total fights: 171
- Title fights: 10

Chronology
2024 in Oktagon MMA	2025 in Oktagon MMA	2026 in Oktagon MMA

The year 2025 was the 9th year in the history of the Oktagon MMA, a mixed martial arts promotion based in Czech Republic and Slovakia.

== List of events ==
#	Event	Date	Venue	Location
1	Oktagon 66: Engizek vs. Oniszczuk	February 1, 2025	PSD Bank Dome	Düsseldorf, Germany
2	Oktagon 67: Creasey vs. Adamia	February 23, 2025	Werk Arena	Třinec, Czech Republic
3	Oktagon 68: Todev vs. Fleury	March 9, 2025	Hanns-Martin-Schleyer-Halle	Stuttgart, Germany
4	Oktagon 69: Holzer vs. Ilbay	April 5, 2025	Westfalenhallen	Dortmund, Germany
5	Oktagon 70: Krištofič vs. Humburger	April 26, 2025	KV Arena	Karlovy Vary, Czech Republic
6	Oktagon 71: Poppeck vs. Langer	May 17, 2025	BMW Park	Munich, Germany
7	Oktagon 72: Vémola vs. Végh 3	June 14, 2025	Fortuna Arena	Prague, Czech Republic
8	Oktagon 73: Eckerlin vs. Pukač	June 28, 2025	Barclays Arena	Hamburg, Germany
9	Oktagon 74: Bolander vs. Szabová	August 9, 2025	Central Tennis Court Štvanice	Prague, Czech Republic
10	Oktagon 75: Palokaj vs. Batfalský	September 13, 2025	ZAG-Arena	Hanover, Germany
11	Oktagon 76: Weichel vs. Tounkara	September 20, 2025	Festhalle Frankfurt	Frankfurt, Germany
12	Oktagon 77: Engizek vs. Humburger	October 4, 2025	Ondrej Nepela Stadium	Bratislava, Slovakia
13	Oktagon 78: Eckerlin vs. Trušček	October 18, 2025	Lanxess Arena	Cologne, Germany
14	Oktagon 79: Surdu vs. Kalašnik	November 1, 2025	Winning Group Arena	Brno, Czech Republic
15	Oktagon 80: Legierski vs. Korkmaz	November 22, 2025	SAP Garden	Munich, Germany
16	Oktagon 81: Fleury vs. Buday	December 28, 2025	O_{2} Arena	Prague, Czech Republic

== Title fights ==
Title fights in 2025
Weight class				Method	Round	Time	Event	Notes
Flyweight	Beno Adamia	def.	Sam Creasey (c)	Decision (split) (48–47, 47–48, 48–47)	5	5:00	Oktagon 67	(Note: For the Oktagon Flyweight Championship.)
Heavyweight	Will Fleury	def.	Lazar Todev	Decision (unanimous) (49–46, 48–47, 48–47)	5	5:00	Oktagon 68	(Note: For the Oktagon Heavyweight Championship.)
Women's Strawweight	Mallory Martin (c)	def.	Eva Dourthe	Decision (unanimous) (49–46, 49–46, 50–45)	5	5:00	Oktagon 70	(Note: For the Oktagon Women's Strawweight Championship.)
Middleweight	Makhmud Muradov	def.	Patrik Kincl	Decision (unanimous) (50–45, 49–46, 49–46)	5	5:00	Oktagon 72	(Note: For the interim Oktagon Middleweight Championship.)
Flyweight	Zhalgas Zhumagulov	def.	Beno Adamia	Decision (unanimous) (49–46, 49–46, 50–45)	5	5:00	Oktagon 73	(Note: For the vacant Oktagon Flyweight Championship. Adamia missed weight (127 lb) and was stripped of the title. Only Zhumagulov was eligible to win the title.)
Women's Bantamweight	Lucia Szabová	def.	Cecilie Bolander (c)	TKO (elbows and punches)	1	3:11	Oktagon 74	(Note: For the Oktagon Women's Bantamweight Championship.)
Welterweight	Ion Surdu	def.	Andrej Kalašnik	TKO (punches and elbow)	1	4:27	Oktagon 79	(Note: For the vacant Oktagon Welterweight Championship. Surdu missed weight (177.9 lb) and was stripped of the title, only Kalašnik was eligible to win the title.)
Lightweight	Mateusz Legierski	def.	Attila Korkmaz	Decision (unanimous) (49–45, 49–45, 49–45)	5	5:00	Oktagon 80	(Note: For the vacant Oktagon Lightweight Championship.)
Flyweight	Zhalgas Zhumagulov (c)	def.	David Dvořák	TKO (doctor stoppage)	3	5:00	Oktagon 81	(Note: For the Oktagon Flyweight Championship.)
Heavyweight	Will Fleury (c)	def.	Martin Buday	TKO (punches)	1	1:40	Oktagon 81	(Note: For the Oktagon Heavyweight Championship.)

== Oktagon Middleweight Tournament ==
=== Background ===
On December 18, 2024, it was announced that a Tipsport Gamechanger 3 took place in 2025, for the middleweight division. On same day, the promotion revealed first two fighters taking part in the tournament includes a current Oktagon Middleweight Champion Kerim Engizek and David Zawada. In the two weeks later, the promotion's has officially released the lineup includes Marek Mazúch, Miloš Petrášek, Vlasto Čepo, Samuel Krištofič, Ion Surdu, Andreas Michailidis, Mark Hulme, Matěj Peňáz, Mick Stanton, Piotr Wawrzyniak, Anthony Salamone and Krzysztof Jotko completed in the tournament. The tournament kicked off at Oktagon 66 on February 1.

=== Tournament brackets ===
Opening round
(Slovakia) Samuel Krištofič	2
(Czech Republic) Dominik Humburger	KO
(Greece) Andreas Michailidis	1
(South Africa) Mark Hulme	SUB
(Czech Republic) Miloš Petrášek	3
(England) Mick Stanton	UD
(Turkey) Kerim Engizek	UD
(Poland) Kamil Oniszczuk (Note: Engizek was originally scheduled to face Anthony Salamone, but Salamone was forced to pulled out due to respective doping violations and was replaced by Kamil Oniszczuk.)	3
(Czech Republic) Matěj Peňáz	TKO
(Germany) David Zawada	1
(Poland) Piotr Wawrzyniak	KO
(Slovakia) Marek Mazúch	1
(Slovakia) Vlasto Čepo	KO
(Austria) Erhan Kartal	1
(Moldova) Ion Surdu	3
(Poland) Krzysztof Jotko	UD

Quarter-finals
(Czech Republic) Dominik Humburger	KO
(South Africa) Mark Hulme	2
(England) Mick Stanton	1
(Turkey) Kerim Engizek	TKO
(Iran) Hojat Khajevand (Note: Matěj Peňáz was forced to withdraw due to an infection of Staphylococcus and was replaced by Hojat Khajevand.)	3
(Poland) Piotr Wawrzyniak	UD
(Slovakia) Marek Mazúch (Note: Vlasto Čepo withdrew from the tournament due to an injury and was replaced by Marek Mazúch.)	2
(Poland) Krzysztof Jotko	TKO

Semi-finals
(Czech Republic) Dominik Humburger	3
(Turkey) Kerim Engizek	UD
(Iran) Hojat Khajevand	3
(Poland) Krzysztof Jotko	UD

Finals
(Turkey) Kerim Engizek	1
(Poland) Krzysztof Jotko	SUB

== Oktagon 66: Engizek vs. Oniszczuk ==
Oktagon 66: Engizek vs. Oniszczuk
- Promotion: Oktagon MMA
- Date: February 1, 2025
- Venue: PSD Bank Dome
- City: Düsseldorf, Germany

Oktagon 66: Engizek vs. Oniszczuk was a mixed martial arts event held by Oktagon MMA on February 1, 2025, in Düsseldorf, Germany.

=== Background ===
The first round of Oktagon Middleweight Tournament between the current Oktagon Middleweight Champion Kerim Engizek and Anthony Salamone was expected to headline the event. While, the event took place the first round middleweight tournament between Matěj Peňáz and David Zawada.

However, Salamone and Damien Lapilus were removed from the event due to two fighters respective doping violations and subsequent suspensions by the French Anti-Doping Agency. As a results, Lapilus opponent Lom-Ali Eskiev faced Wanderley Junior instead. Engizek faced Kamil Oniszczuk, who was scheduled to face Hojat Khajevand at this event. Khajevand completed at this event against Kennedy Rayomba instead.

=== Bonus awards ===
The following fighters received €5,000 bonus.

- Performance of the Night: Deniz Ilbay

=== Results ===
Main card (Oktagon.tv)
Weight class				Method	Round	Time	Notes
Middleweight	Kerim Engizek	def.	Kamil Oniszczuk	Decision (unanimous) (30–27, 30–27, 30–27)	3	5:00	(Note: Oktagon Middleweight Tournament Round of 16.)
Lightweight	Lom-Ali Eskiev	def.	Wanderley Junior	TKO (punches)	2	4:45
Middleweight	Matěj Peňáz	def.	David Zawada	TKO (knee and punches)	1	4:42	(Note: Oktagon Middleweight Tournament Round of 16.)
Featherweight	Deniz Ilbay	def.	Vladimír Lengál	TKO (punches)	1	0:33	(Note: Lengál missed weight (148.3 lb).)
Welterweight	Cihad Akipa	def.	Matouš Kohout	Decision (unanimous) (30–27, 29–28, 29–28)	3	5:00
Middleweight	Hojat Khajevand	def.	Kennedy Rayomba	KO (punches)	1	2:12	(Note: Oktagon Middleweight Tournament Reserve bout; Rayomba missed weight (187 lb).)
Preliminary card (Oktagon.tv)
Lightweight	Daniel Solaja	def.	Raphael Federico	Decision (unanimous) (30–27, 30–27, 30–27)	3	5:00
Welterweight	Emir-Can Al	def.	Viktor Kováč	TKO (punches)	1	3:47
Catchweight (176 lb)	Tamerlan Dulatov	def.	Ghith Ighzawi	Technical Submission (guillotine choke)	1	0:16
Welterweight	Zoran Solaja	def.	Lukáš Eliáš	TKO (punches)	1	1:34
Free Prelims (YouTube)
Women's Bantamweight	Danielle Misteli	def.	Sara Luzar-Smajić	Submission (rear-naked choke)	2	2:30

== Oktagon 67: Creasey vs. Adamia ==
Oktagon 67: Creasey vs. Adamia
- Promotion: Oktagon MMA
- Date: February 22, 2025
- Venue: Werk Arena
- City: Třinec, Czech Republic

Oktagon 67: Creasey vs. Adamia was a mixed martial arts event held by Oktagon MMA on February 22, 2025, in Třinec, Czech Republic.

=== Background ===
An Oktagon Flyweight Championship bout between current champion Sam Creasey and Beno Adamia headlined the event.

The event also was held two bouts opening rounds of Oktagon Middleweight Tournament. However, the match between Piotr Wawrzyniak and Marek Mazúch was moved to Oktagon 70 due to Mazúch injury.

=== Bonus awards ===
The following fighters received €5,000 bonus.

- Performance of the Night: Robert Pukač

=== Results ===
Main card (Oktagon.tv)
Weight class				Method	Round	Time	Notes
Flyweight	Beno Adamia	def.	Sam Creasey (c)	Decision (split) (48–47, 47–48, 48–47)	3	5:00	(Note: For the Oktagon Flyweight Championship.)
Welterweight	Robert Pukač	def.	David Kozma	KO (punches)	1	2:15	(Note: Pukač missed weight (172 lb).)
Middleweight	Mick Stanton	def.	Miloš Petrášek	Decision (unanimous) (30–27, 30–27, 30–27)	3	5:00	(Note: Oktagon Middleweight Tournament Round of 16.)
Middleweight	Mark Hulme	def.	Andreas Michailidis	Submission (guillotine choke)	1	2:20	(Note: Oktagon Middleweight Tournament Round of 16.)
Featherweight	Niko Samsonidse	def.	Édgar Delgado Jimenez	TKO (leg kick)	3	0:27
Women's Bantamweight	Lucia Szabová	def.	Kalindra Faria	Submission (keylock)	1	4:16
Preliminary card (Oktagon.tv)
Light Heavyweight	Daniel Škvor	def.	Antonio Zovak	Submission (guillotine choke)	1	0:26
Middleweight	Jaime Cordero	def.	Milan Ďatelinka	Technical Submission (arm-triangle choke)	1	4:10	(Note: Oktagon Middleweight Tournament Reserve bout.)
Catchweight (159 lb)	Tomáš Mudroch	def.	Petru Buzdugan	TKO (upkick and punches)	1	1:22
Women's Flyweight	Veronika Smolková	def.	Aitana Álvarez	Decision (unanimous) (30–27, 30–27, 30–27)	3	5:00
Free Prelims (YouTube)
Middleweight	Daniel Ligocki	def.	Dominic Schober	TKO (punches)	1	3:29

== Oktagon 68: Todev vs. Fleury ==
Oktagon 68: Todev vs. Fleury
- Promotion: Oktagon MMA
- Date: March 8, 2025
- Venue: Hanns-Martin-Schleyer-Halle
- City: Stuttgart, Germany

Oktagon 68: Todev vs. Fleury was a mixed martial arts event held by Oktagon MMA on March 8, 2025, in Stuttgart, Germany.

=== Background ===
An Oktagon Heavyweight Championship bout for the vacant title between a current Oktagon Light Heavyweight Champion Will Fleury and Lazar Todev headlined the event.

A welterweight bout between Christian Jungwirth and Marek Bartl was expected to serve as co-main the event. However, for health reasons, Jungwirth and Radovan Úškrt withdrew from the event. Subsequently, Úškrt originally opponent Daniel Schwindt stepped in to face Bartl in a 181 pounds bout instead.

A welterweight bout between Niklas Stolze and Jessin Ayari was scheduled for this event. However, Stolze withdrew due to injury and was replaced by Andreas Stahl.

Promotional newcomer Joliton Lutterbach and Makhmud Muradov were scheduled to meet in a middleweight bout. However, Lutterbach was forced to withdraw due to injury and was replaced by another newcomer Yasubey Enomoto.

=== Bonus awards ===
The following fighters received €5,000 bonus.

- Performance of the Night: Daniel Schwindt

=== Results ===
Main card (Oktagon.tv)
Weight class				Method	Round	Time	Notes
Heavyweight	Will Fleury	def.	Lazar Todev	Decision (unanimous) (49–46, 48–47, 48–47)	5	5:00	(Note: For the vacant Oktagon Heavyweight Championship.)
Catchweight (163 lb)	Alan Omer	def.	Łukasz Kopera	Decision (unanimous) (29–28, 29–27, 29–28)	3	5:00
Middleweight	Makhmud Muradov	def.	Yasubey Enomoto	KO (knee and punches)	2	0:40
Catchweight (181 lb)	Daniel Schwindt	def.	Marek Bartl	TKO (punches and elbows)	2	4:41
Welterweight	Jessin Ayari	def.	Andreas Stahl	TKO (punches)	3	4:01
Preliminary card (Oktagon.tv)
Lightweight	Denis Frimpong	def.	Robin Frank	Decision (unanimous) (30–26, 30–27, 30–27)	3	5:00
Bantamweight	Elvis Batista da Silva	def.	Roman Paulus	Decision (split) (29–28, 28–29, 29–28)	3	5:00
Featherweight	Jakub Batfalský	def.	Joel Batobo	TKO (corner stoppage)	2	5:00
Catchweight (194 lb)	Daniel Ligocki	def.	Erik Lorenz	Submission (brabo choke)	1	2:05
Women's Bantamweight	Alina Dalaslan	def.	Kamila Šimková	TKO (punches and knees)	3	3:49
Free Prelims (YouTube)
Catchweight (161 lb)	Kevin Enz	def.	Benny Bajrami	Decision (unanimous) (29–28, 30–27, 29–28)	3	5:00	(Note: Enz missed weight (162.9 lb).)

== Oktagon 69: Holzer vs. Ilbay ==
Oktagon 69: Holzer vs. Ilbay
- Promotion: Oktagon MMA
- Date: April 5, 2025
- Venue: Westfalenhallen
- City: Dortmund, Germany

Oktagon 69: Holzer vs. Ilbay was a mixed martial arts event held by Oktagon MMA on April 5, 2025, in Dortmund, Germany.

=== Background ===
A featherweight bout between undefeated prospect Max Holzer and Deniz Ilbay headlined the event.

A featherweight bout between Mochamed Machaev and Emrah Sonmez was scheduled for this event. However, the bout was moved to Oktagon 71 on May 17 for unknown reasons.

=== Bonus awards ===
The following fighters received €5,000 bonus.

- Performance of the Night: Frederic Vosgröne

=== Results ===
Main card (Oktagon.tv)
Weight class				Method	Round	Time	Notes
Featherweight	Max Holzer	def.	Deniz Ilbay	Submission (rear-naked choke)	4	4:14
Welterweight	Ediz Tasci	def.	Uwe Schüder	TKO (knees and punches)	1	2:51
Catchweight (150 lb)	Khalid Taha	def.	Jose Zarauz	TKO (elbows and punches)	2	4:04	(Note: Zarauz missed weight (150.4 lb).)
Lightweight	Predrag Bogdanović	def.	Fedor Duric	Decision (split) (29–28, 28–29, 29–28)	3	5:00
Featherweight	Gjoni Palokaj	def.	Marco Novák	Decision (unanimous) (30–27, 30–27, 30–27)	3	5:00
Light Heavyweight	Frederic Vosgröne	def.	Jorick Montagnac	Technical Submission (arm-triangle choke)	2	3:36
Preliminary card (Oktagon.tv)
Catchweight (174 lb)	Marcel Mohamed Grabinski	def.	Karol Skrzypek	Decision (unanimous) (29–28, 29–28, 29–28)	3	5:00
Women's Bantamweight	Lucie Pudilová	def.	Brittney Cloudy	Decision (unanimous) (29–28, 30–27, 30–27)	3	5:00
Featherweight	Karol Ryšavý	def.	Eugen Black-Dell	Submission (guillotine choke)	2	4:53
Flyweight	Mohammed Walid	def.	Aaron Aby	Decision (unanimous) (29–28, 29–28, 29–28)	3	5:00
Free Prelims (YouTube)
Catchweight (190 lb)	David Hošek	def.	Aleksandar Stefanovic	Submission (triangle choke)	1	3:38	(Note: Stefanovic missed weight (202 lb).)

== Oktagon 70: Krištofič vs. Humburger ==
Oktagon 70: Krištofič vs. Humburger
- Promotion: Oktagon MMA
- Date: April 26, 2025
- Venue: KV Arena
- City: Karlovy Vary, Czech Republic

Oktagon 70: Krištofič vs. Humburger was a mixed martial arts event held by Oktagon MMA on April 26, 2025, in Karlovy Vary, Czech Republic.

=== Background ===
The event marked the promotion's second visit to Karlovy Vary and first since Oktagon 8 in July 2018.

An Oktagon Bantamweight Championship bout between Igor Severino and former Cage Warriors Bantamweight Champion Jack Cartwright was scheduled to headline the event. However on April 12, the promotion announced that Cartwright has suffered an injury and the pairing would be postponed to a future date.

An Oktagon Women's Strawweight Championship bout between current champion Mallory Martin and Eva Dourthe took place at the event.

The four bouts opening rounds of Oktagon Middleweight Tournament took place at the event.

A women's strawweight bout between former champion Katharina Dalisda and Elin Öberg was removed from the event due to Dalisda's suffered an illness.

=== Bonus awards ===
The following fighters received €5,000 bonus.

- Performance of the Night: Dominik Humburger

=== Results ===
Main card (Oktagon.tv)
Weight class				Method	Round	Time	Notes
Middleweight	Dominik Humburger	def.	Samuel Krištofič	KO (punch)	2	1:58	(Note: Oktagon Middleweight Tournament Round of 16.)
Middleweight	Vlasto Čepo	def.	Erhan Kartal	KO (punch)	1	4:01	(Note: Oktagon Middleweight Tournament Round of 16.)
Middleweight	Krzysztof Jotko	def.	Ion Surdu	Decision (unanimous) (30–27, 30–27, 30–27)	3	5:00	(Note: Oktagon Middleweight Tournament Round of 16.)
Middleweight	Piotr Wawrzyniak	def.	Marek Mazúch	KO (punch)	1	4:36	(Note: Oktagon Middleweight Tournament Round of 16.)
Welterweight	Andrej Kalašnik	def.	Máté Kertész	KO (punch)	1	1:35
Light Heavyweight	Daniel Škvor	def.	Marc Doussis	KO (punch)	1	1:51	(Note: Doussis missed weight (207.6 lb).)
Preliminary card (Oktagon.tv)
Women's Strawweight	Mallory Martin (c)	def.	Eva Dourthe	Decision (unanimous) (49–46, 49–46, 50–45)	5	5:00	(Note: For the Oktagon Women's Strawweight Championship.)
Featherweight	Radek Roušal	def.	Karol Kutyła	TKO (punches)	2	3:36
Middleweight	Hojat Khajevand	def.	Łukasz Siwiec	TKO (punches)	1	3:25	(Note: Oktagon Middleweight Tournament Reserve bout.)
Free Prelims (YouTube)
Light Heavyweight	Mateusz Strzelczyk	def.	Mateusz Duczmal	Submission (heel hook)	1	1:31

== Oktagon 71: Poppeck vs. Langer ==
Oktagon 71: Poppeck vs. Langer
- Promotion: Oktagon MMA
- Date: May 17, 2025
- Venue: BMW Park
- City: Munich, Germany

Oktagon 71: Poppeck vs. Langer was a mixed martial arts event held by Oktagon MMA on May 17, 2025, in Munich, Germany.

=== Background ===
A light heavyweight rematch between former interim Oktagon Light Heavyweight Champion Pavol Langer and Alexander Poppeck headlined the event. The pairing previously met for the interim title at Oktagon 44 in June 2023, which Langer won the title by split decision.

A lightweight bout between Lom-Ali Eskiev and Shem Rock was scheduled for this event. However, Eskiev withdrew due to injury as car crash and was replaced by Abdullo Khodzhaev. In turn, Khodzhaev pulled out due to visa issues and was replaced by Attila Korkmaz.

On May 7, it was announced that featherweight bout between Mochamed Machaev and Emrah Sonmez was cancelled due to Sonmez injury. In addition, Rony Bouzy withdrew from the bout against Patrick Vespaziani and was replaced by Jovan Zeljkovic.

A welterweight bout between Tamerlan Dulatov and Emmanuel Binyet was removed from the event due to Dulatov's infection.

=== Bonus awards ===
The following fighters received €5,000 bonus.

- Performance of the Night: Alexander Poppeck

=== Results ===
Main card (Oktagon.tv)
Weight class				Method	Round	Time	Notes
Light Heavyweight	Alexander Poppeck	def.	Pavol Langer	KO (punch)	1	1:15
Catchweight (163 lb)	Denis Frimpong	def.	Arijan Topallaj	TKO (punches and elbows)	3	0:44
Catchweight (161 lb)	Shaqueme Rock	def.	Attila Korkmaz	Decision (split) (28–29, 29–28, 30–27)	3	5:00
Heavyweight	Patrick Vespaziani	def.	Jovan Zeljkovic	TKO (elbows)	1	0:41
Catchweight (159 lb)	Gökhan Aksu	def.	Ognjen Dimić	TKO (knee and punches)	1	2:43
Lightweight	Tomáš Mudroch	def.	Ozan Aslaner	KO (punches)	1	2:03	(Note: Mudroch missed weight (159.4 lb).)
Preliminary card (Oktagon.tv)
Lightweight	George Staines	def.	Hafeni Nafuka	Decision (unanimous) (29–28, 30–27, 30–27)	3	5:00
Featherweight	Wanderley Junior	def.	Jakub Dohnal	KO (punch)	1	0:19
Light Heavyweight	Zdeněk Polívka	def.	Harun Uzun	Decision (unanimous) (29–28, 29–28, 29–28)	3	5:00
Lightweight	Peter Gabal	def.	Elias Jakobi	TKO (punches)	1	2:07
Free Prelims (YouTube)
Welterweight	Endrit Brajshori	def.	Jan Malach	KO (punches)	1	1:33

== Oktagon 72: Vémola vs. Végh 3 ==
Oktagon 72: Vémola vs. Végh 3
- Promotion: Oktagon MMA
- Date: June 14, 2025
- Venue: Fortuna Arena
- City: Prague, Czech Republic

Oktagon 72: Vémola vs. Végh 3 was a mixed martial arts event held by Oktagon MMA on June 14, 2025, in Prague, Czech Republic.

=== Background ===
The event marked the promotion's second held in Fortuna Arena and first since Oktagon 58 in June 2024.

A light heavyweight trilogy between former Oktagon Middleweight and Light Heavyweight Champion Karlos Vémola and former Bellator Light Heavyweight World Champion Attila Végh headlined the event. The pairing first met at Oktagon 15 in November 2019, where Végh won by first round knockout. Their second meeting took place at Oktagon 58 in March 2023, which Vémola defended the light heavyweight title by second round submission.

The co-main event took place an interim Oktagon Middleweight Championship bout between Makhmud Muradov and former champion Patrik Kincl.

An interim Oktagon Women's Bantamweight Championship bout between undefeated contender Lucia Szabová and Lucie Pudilová was scheduled to take place at this event. However on May 14, it was announced that Pudilová withdrew from the bout due to injury.

Current Oktagon Middleweight Champion Kerim Engizek and Mick Stanton were scheduled to meet in a quarterfinal of Oktagon Middleweight Tournament, but Engizek withdrew from the event due to injury and the pairing would be postponed to a future date.

On June 9, the middleweight tournament quarterfinal between Matěj Peňáz and former interim middleweight champion Piotr Wawrzyniak was removed from the event due to Peňáz has suffered an infection. Subsequently, Frederic Vosgröne withdrew from the bout against Lucas Alsina due to suffered an infection and was replaced by Daniel Škvor.

=== Bonus awards ===
The following fighters received €5,000 bonus.

- Performance of the Night: Karlos Vémola

=== Results ===
Main card (Oktagon.tv)
Weight class				Method	Round	Time	Notes
Light Heavyweight	Karlos Vémola	def.	Attila Végh	Decision (unanimous) (49–46, 48–47, 48–47)	5	5:00	(Note: For the symbolic "Infinity" title.)
Middleweight	Makhmud Muradov	def.	Patrik Kincl	Decision (unanimous) (50–45, 49–46, 49–46)	5	5:00	(Note: For the interim Oktagon Middleweight Championship.)
Lightweight	Ivan Buchinger	def.	Vladimír Lengál	Submission (rear-naked choke)	2	4:31
Welterweight	Ronald Paradeiser	def.	Bojan Veličković	TKO (leg injury)	1	1:31
Preliminary card (Oktagon.tv)
Light Heavyweight	Daniel Škvor	def.	Lucas Alsina	TKO (elbow and punches)	2	4:39
Middleweight	Jaime Cordero	def.	David Hošek	TKO (doctor stoppage)	2	4:42
Featherweight	Jakub Batfalský	def.	Karol Ryšavý	Decision (unanimous) (30–27, 30–27, 29–28)	3	5:00
Women's Bantamweight	Alina Dalaslan	def.	Róża Gumienna	TKO (punches)	3	3:19
Catchweight (143 lb)	Ayton De Paepe	def.	Roman Paulus	Decision (split) (29–28, 28–29, 30–27)	3	5:00	(Note: De Paepe missed weight (145.5 lb).)
Free Prelims (YouTube)
Catchweight (159 lb)	Jan Stanovský	def.	Daniel Solaja	Submission (armbar)	3	4:33	(Note: Stanovský missed weight (160.4 lb).)

== Oktagon 73: Eckerlin vs. Pukač ==
Oktagon 73: Eckerlin vs. Pukač
- Promotion: Oktagon MMA
- Date: June 28, 2025
- Venue: Barclays Arena
- City: Hamburg, Germany

Oktagon 73: Eckerlin vs. Pukač was a mixed martial arts event held by Oktagon MMA on June 28, 2025, in Hamburg, Germany.

=== Background ===
A welterweight bout between Christian Eckerlin and Robert Pukač headlined the event.

An Oktagon Flyweight Championship bout between current champion Beno Adamia and Zhalgas Zhumagulov took place at the event. At the weigh-ins, Adamia weighed in at 127 pounds, 2 pounds over the flyweight limit. As a results, Adamia was stripped of the title and only Zhumagulov was eligible to win it.

=== Bonus awards ===
The following fighters received €5,000 bonus.

- Performance of the Night: Wahed Nazhand

=== Results ===
Main card (Oktagon.tv)
Weight class				Method	Round	Time	Notes
Welterweight	Robert Pukač	def.	Christian Eckerlin	TKO (punches)	3	1:05	(Note: Pukač missed weight (175 lb).)
Heavyweight	Kasim Aras	def.	Adam Pałasz	KO (punches)	1	1:42
Welterweight	Kaik Brito	def.	Joilton Lutterbach	KO (knee and punches)	1	1:43
Welterweight	Jessin Ayari	def.	Niklas Stolze	Submission (rear-naked choke)	2	3:25
Bantamweight	Jonas Mågård	def.	Farbod Iran Nezhad	Decision (unanimous) (30–27, 30–27, 30–27)	3	5:00	(Note: Nezhad missed weight (140 lb).)
Welterweight	Wahed Nazhand	def.	Faridun Shokhnazarov	Submission (kimura)	2	3:42
Preliminary card (Oktagon.tv)
Flyweight	Zhalgas Zhumagulov	def.	Beno Adamia	Decision (unanimous) (49–46, 49–46, 50–45)	5	5:00	(Note: For the vacant Oktagon Flyweight Championship. Adamia missed weight (127 lb) and was stripped of the title. Only Zhumagulov was eligible to win the title.)
Catchweight (181 lb)	Marek Bartl	def.	Daniel Makin	Submission (kimura)	2	4:18
Catchweight (150 lb)	Richie Smullen	def.	Vojto Barborík	TKO (punches and elbows)	2	3:49
Lightweight	Tomáš Cigánik	def.	Ahmad Halimson	Decision (split) (29–28, 28–29, 29–28)	3	5:00
Free Prelims (YouTube)
Lightweight	Altin Zenuni	def.	Tibor Balázs	Submission (rear-naked choke)	1	2:01

== Oktagon 74: Bolander vs. Szabová ==
Oktagon 74: Bolander vs. Szabová
- Promotion: Oktagon MMA
- Date: August 9, 2025
- Venue: Central Tennis Court Štvanice
- City: Prague, Czech Republic

Oktagon 74: Bolander vs. Szabová was a mixed martial arts event held by Oktagon MMA on August 9, 2025, in Prague, Czech Republic.

=== Background ===
The event was headlined by an Oktagon Women's Bantamweight Championship bout between current champion Cecilie Bolander and undefeated contender Lucia Szabová.

An Oktagon Bantamweight Championship bout between Igor Severino and former Cage Warriors Bantamweight Champion Jack Cartwright was scheduled to serve as the featured bout of the preliminary card. They were originally scheduled to headline Oktagon 70 in last April, but Cartwright withdrew due to has suffered an injury. In turn, Cartwright withdrew once again due to has suffered an injury and was replaced by Elvis Batista da Silva. Subsequently, the bout was cancelled once again due to an injury, but though it isn’t clear which fighter couldn’t compete at this time.

The quarterfinals of Oktagon Middleweight Tournament took place at this event. On July 9, it was reported that Vlasto Čepo withdrew from the event against Krzysztof Jotko due to injury and was replaced by Marek Mazúch, who scheduled to face Hojat Khajevand at this event. On August 2, Matěj Peňáz was forced to withdraw from the event against former interim Oktagon Middleweight Champion Piotr Wawrzyniak due to an infection of Staphylococcus and was replaced by Khajevand.

In addition, Jakub Tichota and Raphael Federico were scheduled at this event, but Tichota withdrew from the event due to health problems and was replaced by promotional newcomer Vojtěch Khol in a 152 pounds bout.

=== Bonus awards ===
The following fighters received €5,000 bonus.

- Performance of the Night: Dominik Humburger

=== Results ===
Main card (Oktagon.tv)
Weight class				Method	Round	Time	Notes
Women's Bantamweight	Lucia Szabová	def.	Cecilie Bolander (c)	TKO (elbows and punches)	1	3:11	(Note: For the Oktagon Women's Bantamweight Championship.)
Middleweight	Kerim Engizek	def.	Mick Stanton	TKO (punches)	1	3:03	(Note: Oktagon Middleweight Tournament Quarterfinal.)
Middleweight	Dominik Humburger	def.	Mark Hulme	KO (elbow and punches)	2	2:59	(Note: Oktagon Middleweight Tournament Quarterfinal; Humburger missed weight (187.2 lb).)
Middleweight	Krzysztof Jotko	def.	Marek Mazúch	TKO (elbows)	2	4:36	(Note: Oktagon Middleweight Tournament Quarterfinal; both fighters missed weight: Jotko (190.6 lb) and Mazúch (191 lb).)
Middleweight	Hojat Khajevand	def.	Piotr Wawrzyniak	Decision (unanimous) (29–28, 29–28, 29–28)	3	5:00	(Note: Oktagon Middleweight Tournament Quarterfinal.)
Preliminary card (Oktagon.tv)
Featherweight	Radek Roušal	def.	Adrian Hamerski	TKO (punches)	2	1:09
Middleweight	Kamil Oniszczuk	def.	David Zawada	Decision (unanimous) (30–27, 30–27, 30–27)	3	5:00	(Note: Oktagon Middleweight Tournament Reserve bout.)
Catchweight (192 lb)	Daniel Ligocki	def.	Andre Langen	TKO (knees and punches)	1	2:00
Catchweight (152 lb)	Vojtěch Khol	def.	Raphael Federico	Submission (guillotine choke)	3	1:11
Free Prelims (YouTube)
Women's Bantamweight	Niamh Kinehan	def.	Michaela Hlaváčiková	Decision (unanimous) (30–27, 30–27, 29–28)	3	5:00

== Oktagon 75: Palokaj vs. Batfalský ==
Oktagon 75: Palokaj vs. Batfalský
- Promotion: Oktagon MMA
- Date: September 13, 2025
- Venue: ZAG-Arena
- City: Hanover, Germany

Oktagon 75: Palokaj vs. Batfalský was a mixed martial arts event held by Oktagon MMA on September 13, 2025, in Hanover, Germany.

=== Background ===
The event marked the promotion's debut in Hanover.

A featherweight bout between undefeated prospect Max Holzer and Khalid Taha was scheduled to headline the event. However on August 30, Holzer withdrew from the event due to health issues and was replaced by former LUX Featherweight Champion Édgar Delgado Jimenez. As a results, a featherweight bout between Gjoni Palokaj and Jakub Batfalský will be promoted to main event status.

Zdeněk Polívka and undefeated promotional newcomer Emilio Quissua were scheduled to meet in a light heavyweight bout. However, Polívka withdrew from the bout due to an injury and was replaced by Mateusz Strzelczyk.

A featherweight bout between Nikolaos Serbezis and Joel Batobo was scheduled for this event. However, Batobo withdrew from the event due to health issues and was replaced by promotional newcomer Amir Shah Bayat. In turn, Bayat was pulled out and was replaced by Henrique Madureira.

During the fight week, Jack Maguire withdrew from the event against promotional newcomer Hugo Vach due to an injury and was replaced by another newcomer Abdullah Sultani. In turn, Sultani withdrew from the event during the weigh-ins and was replaced by Moritz Mertens.

=== Bonus awards ===
The following fighters received €5,000 bonus.

- Performance of the Night: Khalid Taha

=== Results ===
Main card (Oktagon.tv)
Weight class				Method	Round	Time	Notes
Featherweight	Gjoni Palokaj	def.	Jakub Batfalský	Decision (unanimous) (30–27, 30–27, 30–26)	3	5:00
Heavyweight	Lazar Todev	def.	Luis Henrique	Decision (unanimous) (30–27, 30–27, 29–28)	3	5:00
Flyweight	David Dvořák	def.	Mohammed Walid	KO (punches)	1	3:56
Featherweight	Khalid Taha	def.	Édgar Delgado Jimenez	KO (punches)	3	0:38
Light Heavyweight	Emilio Quissua	def.	Mateusz Strzelczyk	TKO (punches)	1	3:03
Preliminary card (Oktagon.tv)
Featherweight	Mochamed Machaev	def.	Wanderley Junior	TKO (punches)	2	4:37
Catchweight (153 lb)	Hugo Vach	def.	Moritz Mertens	TKO (doctor stoppage)	1	5:00
Welterweight	Lukáš Eliáš	def.	Emir-Can Al	Submission (rear-naked choke)	2	3:35
Featherweight	Henrique Madureira	def.	Nikolaos Serbezis	KO (punch)	1	2:35
Free Prelims (YouTube)
Catchweight (176 lb)	Jixie Molapo	def.	Finn Griessmann	Decision (unanimous) (29–28, 29–28, 29–28)	3	5:00

== Oktagon 76: Weichel vs. Tounkara ==
Oktagon 76: Weichel vs. Tounkara
- Promotion: Oktagon MMA
- Date: September 20, 2025
- Venue: Festhalle Frankfurt
- City: Frankfurt, Germany

Oktagon 76: Weichel vs. Tounkara was a mixed martial arts event held by Oktagon MMA on September 20, 2025, in Frankfurt, Germany.

=== Background ===
A lightweight bout between Daniel Weichel and Aboubakar Tounkara headlined the event. The main event was originally scheduled as a light heavyweight bout between Frederic Vosgröne and Fabio Moraes, but the bout was shifted to the co-main event instead.

A 161 pounds bout between Hassan Shaaban and Hafeni Nafuka was scheduled for this event. However, due to repeated unprofessional behaviour towards with promotion, Shaaban was pulled out from the event and he was subsequently released by the promotion. He was replaced by Kevin Enz and changed to 163 pounds catchweight bout.

During fight week, the heavyweight bout between Patrick Vespaziani and Paweł Biernat was removed from the event for unknown reasons. In addition, the welterweight featuring Tamerlan Dulatov and Nesarahmad Nadri, but Nadri withdrew from the bout due to an injury and was replaced by Sebastian Hirtenlehner. Before the event started, the bout was cancelled due to health issues with Hirtenlehner.

=== Bonus awards ===
The following fighters received €5,000 bonus.

- Performance of the Night: Alina Dalaslan

=== Results ===
Main card (Oktagon.tv)
Weight class				Method	Round	Time	Notes
Lightweight	Daniel Weichel	def.	Aboubakar Tounkara	Decision (unanimous) (30–27, 30–27, 30–27)	3	5:00
Light Heavyweight	Frederic Vosgröne	def.	Fabio Moraes	Submission (rear-naked choke)	1	4:15
Lightweight	Attila Korkmaz	def.	David-Tonatiuh Crol	Decision (unanimous) (30–27, 30–27, 30–27)	3	5:00
Lightweight	Denis Frimpong	def.	Peter Gabal	TKO (punches)	3	1:42
Catchweight (132 lb)	Alina Dalaslan	def.	Clara Ricignuolo	KO (spinning back elbow)	2	4:45
Preliminary card (Oktagon.tv)
Lightweight	Fedor Duric	def.	Petru Buzdugan	Submission (face crank)	1	3:58
Catchweight (163 lb)	Hafeni Nafuka	def.	Kevin Enz	Submission (rear-naked choke)	1	2:28
Featherweight	James Hendin	def.	Ayton De Paepe	Decision (unanimous) (29–28, 29–28, 29–28)	3	5:00
Bantamweight	Raul Lemberanskij	def.	Jose Zarauz	Decision (unanimous) (30–27, 29–28, 29–28)	3	5:00	(Note: Zarauz missed weight (137.7 lb).)
Free Prelims (YouTube)
Middleweight	David Hošek	def.	Georg Bilogrevic	Decision (unanimous) (29–28, 30–27, 30–27)	3	5:00	(Note: Bilogrevic missed weight (189 lb).)

== Oktagon 77: Engizek vs. Humburger ==
Oktagon 77: Engizek vs. Humburger
- Promotion: Oktagon MMA
- Date: October 4, 2025
- Venue: Ondrej Nepela Stadium
- City: Bratislava, Slovakia

Oktagon 77: Engizek vs. Humburger was a mixed martial arts event held by Oktagon MMA on October 4, 2025, in Bratislava, Slovakia.

=== Background ===
An Oktagon Heavyweight Championship bout between current champion (also a current Oktagon Light Heavyweight Champion) Will Fleury and former champion Martin Buday was rumoured to headline the event, but it never materialized due to Fleury had been announced in advance that his cousin would be holding a wedding ceremony that day.

The semifinals of Oktagon Middleweight Tournament took place at this event.

A lightweight rematch between former Oktagon Featherweight and Lightweight Champion Ivan Buchinger and Vojto Barborík was scheduled for this event. They previously competed for the featherweight title at Oktagon 27 in September 2021, where Buchinger won the title via unanimous decision. However, Barborík withdrew from the bout due to personal reasons and was replaced by Richie Smullen.

Karol Ryšavý and Samuel Bark were scheduled to meet in a featherweight bout. However, Bark withdrew due to an injury and was replaced by Ayton De Paepe, who last fought a two weeks ago at Oktagon 76.

=== Bonus awards ===
The following fighters received €5,000 bonus.

- Performance of the Night: Vlasto Čepo

=== Results ===
Main card (Oktagon.tv)
Weight class				Method	Round	Time	Notes
Middleweight	Kerim Engizek	def.	Dominik Humburger	Decision (unanimous) (29–28, 29–28, 29–28)	3	5:00	(Note: Oktagon Middleweight Tournament Semifinal.)
Middleweight	Vlasto Čepo	def.	Daniel Schwindt	KO (punch)	1	3:38
Middleweight	Krzysztof Jotko	def.	Hojat Khajevand	Decision (unanimous) (29–28, 29–28, 30–27)	3	5:00	(Note: Oktagon Middleweight Tournament Semifinal; Jotko missed weight (187 lb).)
Lightweight	Ivan Buchinger	def.	Richie Smullen	Submission (ninja choke)	3	1:40
Middleweight	Jaime Cordero	def.	Samuel Krištofič	TKO (arm injury)	1	2:49	(Note: Oktagon Middleweight Tournament Reserve bout.)
Featherweight	Marco Novák	def.	Daniel Solaja	TKO (punches)	3	0:30
Preliminary card (Oktagon.tv)
Catchweight (159 lb)	Konrad Dyrschka	def.	Tomáš Cigánik	Decision (split) (29–28, 28–29, 29–28)	3	5:00
Women's Flyweight	Veronika Smolková	def.	Ana Carolina Araujo	Decision (unanimous) (30–27, 30–27, 30–27)	3	5:00
Featherweight	Ayton De Paepe	def.	Karol Ryšavý	Decision (split) (29–28, 28–29, 29–28)	3	5:00
Catchweight (121 lb)	Monika Chochlíková	def.	Atenea Flores	Decision (unanimous) (30–27, 30–27, 29–28)	3	5:00	(Note: Oktagon Underground Rules (3min / 3R).)
Free Prelims (YouTube)
Light Heavyweight	Jorick Montagnac	def.	Mateusz Duczmal	Decision (unanimous) (30–27, 30–27, 30–27)	3	5:00

== Oktagon 78: Eckerlin vs. Trušček ==
Oktagon 78: Eckerlin vs. Trušček
- Promotion: Oktagon MMA
- Date: October 18, 2025
- Venue: Lanxess Arena
- City: Cologne, Germany

Oktagon 78: Eckerlin vs. Trušček was a mixed martial arts event held by Oktagon MMA on October 18, 2025, in Cologne, Germany.

=== Background ===
A welterweight bout between Christian Eckerlin and Ivica Trušček headlined the event.

An Oktagon Bantamweight Championship bout for the vacant title between Igor Severino and 2023 PFL Europe Bantamweight Tournament winner Khurshed Kakhorov was scheduled to take place at the event. At the weigh-ins, Kakhorov weighed in at 135.8 lb, 0.8 pounds over the limit. As a result, Kakhorov was ineligible for the title, which only Severino was eligible to win the title. However, before the event started, Kakhorov has been forced to withdraw from the event due to health issues. Therefore, the bantamweight title bout was cancelled once again.

A welterweight bout between former Oktagon Lightweight Champion Ronald Paradeiser and Marcel Mohamed Grabinski was scheduled for this event. However, the bout was cancelled after Grabinski withdrew.

A heavyweight bout between Patrick Vespaziani and Yevhenii Orlov was scheduled for this event. However, Orlov was forced to withdraw due to an injury and was replaced by UFC veteran Denis Stojnić. In turn, Stojnić pulled out at the last minute and was replaced by Olutobi Ayodeji Kalejaiye.

Deniz Ilbay was scheduled to face Teo Saldaña Smith in a featherweight bout. However, the bout was cancelled during the fight week due to Ilbay's injury.

Undefeated prospects Frederic Vosgröne and Jesus Samuel Chavarría were scheduled to meet in a light heavyweight bout. However, Vosgröne withdrew from the bout before the weigh-ins due to suffered an injury and was replaced by Aleksandar Stefanovic.

=== Bonus awards ===
The following fighters received €5,000 bonus.

- Performance of the Night: Marek Bartl

=== Results ===
Main card (Oktagon.tv)
Weight class				Method	Round	Time	Notes
Welterweight	Ivica Trušček	def.	Christian Eckerlin	TKO (elbows)	1	3:34
Women's Bantamweight	Alina Dalaslan	def.	Katharina Lehner	Decision (unanimous) (30–27, 30–27, 29–28)	3	5:00
Heavyweight	Kasim Aras	def.	Simon Biyong	Decision (unanimous) (30–27, 30–27, 30–27)	3	5:00
Middleweight	Cihad Akipa	def.	David Piechaczek	TKO (punches)	2	2:12
Heavyweight	Patrick Vespaziani	def.	Olutobi Ayodeji Kalejaiye	TKO (punches and elbows)	1	2:23
Catchweight (163 lb)	Arijan Topallaj	def.	Hassan Kayani	Decision (unanimous) (29–27, 29–27, 29–27)	3	5:00	(Note: Topallaj was deducted one point in round 1 due to an eye poke.)
Preliminary card (Oktagon.tv)
Welterweight	Tamerlan Dulatov	def.	Henrique Melo	TKO (knee and punches)	1	0:52
Middleweight	Marek Bartl	def.	Kennedy Rayomba	KO (spinning back elbow)	1	2:59
Catchweight (209 lb)	Jesus Samuel Chavarría	def.	Aleksandar Stefanovic	TKO (shoulder injury)	1	2:19
Catchweight (150 lb)	Altin Zenuni	def.	Marcel Máša	Decision (unanimous) (29–28, 29–28, 30–27)	3	5:00
Free Prelims: Amateur bout (YouTube)
Catchweight (176 lb)	Michael Obodozie	def.	Kirill Negru	KO (punch)	1	0:19

== Oktagon 79: Surdu vs. Kalašnik ==
Oktagon 79: Surdu vs. Kalašnik
- Promotion: Oktagon MMA
- Date: November 1, 2025
- Venue: Winning Group Arena
- City: Brno, Czech Republic

Oktagon 79: Surdu vs. Kalašnik was a mixed martial arts event held by Oktagon MMA on November 1, 2025, in Brno, Czech Republic.

=== Background ===
An Oktagon Welterweight Championship bout between current champion Ion Surdu and Andrej Kalašnik headlined this event. At the weigh-ins, Surdu weighed in at 177.9 pounds, 7.9 pounds over the welterweight title-fight limit. As a results, Surdu was stripped of the title and only Kalašnik was eligible to win it.

Undefeated promotional newcomer Brian Manning was expected to face Daniel Ligocki at this event. However, Manning withdrew from the bout due to an injury. He was replaced by Pedro Oliveira.

In addition, a lightweight bout between Jan Stanovský and Ozan Aslaner was removed from the event due to Stanovský's illness.

=== Bonus awards ===
The following fighters received €5,000 bonus.

- Performance of the Night: Radek Roušal

=== Results ===
Main card (Oktagon.tv)
Weight class				Method	Round	Time	Notes
Welterweight	Ion Surdu	def.	Andrej Kalašnik	TKO (punches and elbow)	1	4:27	(Note: For the vacant Oktagon Welterweight Championship. Surdu missed weight (177.9 lb) and was stripped of the title, only Kalašnik was eligible to win the title.)
Lightweight	Vladimír Lengál	def.	Ognjen Dimić	TKO (elbows)	2	4:52
Lightweight	Tomáš Mudroch	def.	Jakub Dohnal	KO (punches and elbows)	1	2:01	(Note: Mudroch missed weight (157 lb).)
Featherweight	Radek Roušal	def.	Corey Fry	KO (punches)	1	1:54	(Note: Roušal missed weight (148.2 lb).)
Catchweight (190 lb)	Pedro Oliveira	def.	Daniel Ligocki	Decision (unanimous) (30–27, 30–27, 30–27)	3	5:00
Featherweight	Samuel Bark	def.	Mate Sanikidze	Submission (rear-naked choke)	3	4:31
Preliminary card (Oktagon.tv)
Catchweight (139 lb)	Nathan Haywood	def.	Lukáš Chotěnovský	KO (head kick and punches)	1	2:58
Featherweight	Václav Štěpán	def.	Karol Kutyła	Submission (kimura)	2	3:46
Catchweight (139 lb)	Liam Pitts	def.	Stephan Guidea	Submission (rear-naked choke)	1	2:29
Middleweight	Vašek Klimša	def.	Jessy Joaquim	Technical Submission (Von Flue choke)	1	1:23
Free Prelims (YouTube)
Bantamweight	Harun Kurt	def.	Šimon Bruknar	Decision (unanimous) (30–27, 29–28, 29–28)	3	5:00

== Oktagon 80: Legierski vs. Korkmaz ==
Oktagon 80: Legierski vs. Korkmaz
- Promotion: Oktagon MMA
- Date: November 22, 2025
- Venue: SAP Garden
- City: Munich, Germany

Oktagon 80: Legierski vs. Korkmaz was a mixed martial arts event held by Oktagon MMA on November 22, 2025, in Munich, Germany.

=== Background ===
An Oktagon Lightweight Championship bout for the vacant title between former champion Mateusz Legierski and Attila Korkmaz headlined the event.

The main event was originally scheduled as a welterweight bout between Christian Jungwirth and UFC veteran Niklas Stolze, but the bout was shifted to the co-main event instead and remained five rounds.

A welterweight bout between former Oktagon Welterweight Champion Kaik Brito and Jessin Ayari was scheduled for this event. However, the bout was cancelled due to an injury with Ayari.

A welterweight bout between former lightweight champion Ronald Paradeiser and Joilton Lutterbach was scheduled for this event. However, Lutterbach pulled out due to an injury and was replaced by former LFA Welterweight Champion Geraldo Neto.

In addition, Marek Mazúch withdrew from his 194 pounds bout against Alexander Poppeck due to health complications with an infection and was replaced by David Hošek.

Endrit Brajshori was scheduled to face Matouš Kohout in a welterweight bout, but he withdrew from the event due to an infection and was replaced by Hafeni Nafuka.

=== Bonus awards ===
The following fighters received €5,000 bonus.

- Performance of the Night: Gökhan Aksu

=== Results ===
Main card (Oktagon.tv)
Weight class				Method	Round	Time	Notes
Lightweight	Mateusz Legierski	def.	Attila Korkmaz	Decision (unanimous) (49–45, 49–45, 49–45)	5	5:00	(Note: For the vacant Oktagon Lightweight Championship.)
Welterweight	Christian Jungwirth	def.	Niklas Stolze	TKO (punches)	4	4:19
Catchweight (196 lb)	Alexander Poppeck	def.	David Hošek	TKO (elbows)	2	2:25
Welterweight	Ronald Paradeiser	def.	Geraldo Neto	TKO (elbow and punches)	2	2:24
Lightweight	Gökhan Aksu	def.	Denis Frimpong	TKO (punches)	1	3:58
Welterweight	Matouš Kohout	def.	Hafeni Nafuka	Decision (split) (29–28, 28–29, 29–28)	3	5:00
Preliminary card (Oktagon.tv)
Welterweight	Felix Klinkhammer	def.	Máté Kertész	Submission (kneebar)	1	4:46
Catchweight (150 lb)	Teo Saldaña Smith	def.	Michael Deiga-Scheck	TKO (elbows)	1	4:35
Lightweight	Ozan Aslaner	def.	Marco Antonio Elpidio	Decision (split) (29–28, 28–29, 29–28)	3	5:00	(Note: Elpidio missed weight (157.9 lb).)
Catchweight (152 lb)	Henrique Madureira	def.	Eriglent Prizreni	Submission (inverted triangle choke)	1	1:10
Free Prelims (YouTube)
Featherweight	Eugen Black-Dell	def.	Eemil Kurhela	TKO (punches)	2	3:30

== Oktagon 81: Fleury vs. Buday ==
Oktagon 81: Fleury vs. Buday
- Promotion: Oktagon MMA
- Date: December 28, 2025
- Venue: O_{2} Arena
- City: Prague, Czech Republic

Oktagon 81: Fleury vs. Buday was a mixed martial arts event held by Oktagon MMA on December 28, 2025, in Prague, Czech Republic.

=== Background ===
An Oktagon Heavyweight Championship bout between current champion (also a current Oktagon Light Heavyweight Champion) Will Fleury and former champion Martin Buday headlined the event.

An Oktagon Flyweight Championship bout between current champion Zhalgas Zhumagulov and David Dvořák served as the co-main event.

A welterweight bout between former Oktagon Welterweight Champion Kaik Brito and Amiran Gogoladze was scheduled for this event. However, Gogoladze withdrew from the event due to a knee injury. The matchup for Brito was moved to Oktagon 84 in February 2026, to challenge for the vacant title with former lightweight champion Ronald Paradeiser.

On December 13, it was reported that promotional newcomer Stanislav Mašek pulled out from the bout against Viktor Kováč and was replaced by another newcomer Alex Hutyra.

A women's flyweight bout between Veronika Smolková and promotional newcomer (also a UFC veteran) Stephanie Egger was scheduled for this event. However, Egger pulled out from the bout due to an illness and was replaced by another newcomer Marta Sós.

=== Bonus awards ===
The following fighters received €5,000 bonus.

- Performance of the Night: Will Fleury

=== Results ===
Main card (Oktagon.tv)
Weight class				Method	Round	Time	Notes
Heavyweight	Will Fleury (c)	def.	Martin Buday	TKO (punches)	1	1:40	(Note: For the Oktagon Heavyweight Championship.)
Flyweight	Zhalgas Zhumagulov (c)	def.	David Dvořák	TKO (doctor stoppage)	3	5:00	(Note: For the Oktagon Flyweight Championship.)
Middleweight	Patrik Kincl	def.	Robert Pukač	Decision (unanimous) (30–27, 30–27, 30–27)	3	5:00
Heavyweight	Daniel Škvor	def.	Patrick Vespaziani	Technical Submission (guillotine choke)	2	3:16
Middleweight	Ondřej Raška	def.	Pavel Tóth	TKO (punches)	1	1:19	(Note: Oktagon Celebrity Series bout.)
Preliminary card (Oktagon.tv)
Light Heavyweight	Mateusz Strzelczyk	def.	Miloš Petrášek	Submission (armbar)	2	1:51
Bantamweight	Jonas Mågård	def.	Elvis Batista da Silva	Decision (unanimous) (30–27, 30–25, 30–26)	3	5:00
Catchweight (131 lb)	Veronika Smolková	def.	Marta Sós	TKO (elbows and punches)	1	2:29
Featherweight	Hugo Vach	def.	Vojtěch Khol	Decision (unanimous) (30–27, 30–27, 30–27)	3	5:00
Welterweight	Alex Hutyra	def.	Viktor Kováč	Submission (rear-naked choke)	2	2:52
Free Prelims (YouTube)
Lightweight	Ivan Klevets	def.	Bartłomiej Skowyra	Decision (unanimous) (29–28, 29–28, 30–27)	3	5:00

== See also ==
- List of current Oktagon MMA fighters
- 2025 in UFC
- 2025 in ONE Championship
- 2025 in Professional Fighters League
- 2025 in Cage Warriors
- 2025 in Absolute Championship Akhmat
- 2025 in Konfrontacja Sztuk Walki
- 2025 in Legacy Fighting Alliance
- 2025 in Rizin Fighting Federation
- 2025 in LUX Fight League
- 2025 in Brave Combat Federation
- 2025 in UAE Warriors
