= Kamil Oniszczuk =

Polish mixed martial artist (born 1996)

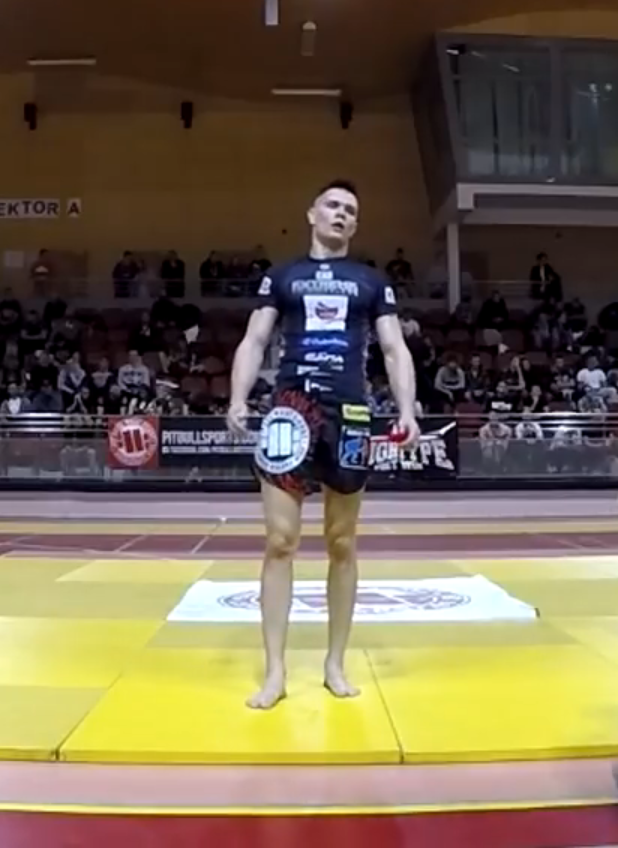
- Oniszczuk during the Polish No Gi Jiu Jitsu Cup 2017
- Born: Kamil Oniszczuk; 28 September 1996 (age 30); Międzyrzecz, Poland
- Other names: KO
- Height: 6 ft 3 in (1.91 m)
- Weight: 185 lb (84 kg; 13 st 3 lb)
- Division: Welterweight (2016–2021); Middleweight (2021–present)
- Reach: 74 in (188 cm)
- Style: Brazilian Jiu-jitsu
- Fighting out of: Deerfield Beach, Florida, United States
- Team: Kill Cliff FC; Oleksiejczuk Team
- Rank: Brown belt in Brazilian Jiu-jitsu
- Years active: 2016–present

Mixed martial arts record
- Total: 18
- Wins: 13
- By knockout: 5
- By submission: 2
- By decision: 6
- By disqualification: 0
- Losses: 5
- By knockout: 2
- By submission: 1
- By decision: 2

Other information
- Mixed martial arts record from Sherdog

Kamil Oniszczuk (born 28 September 1996) is a Polish professional mixed martial artist. He currently competes in the Middleweight division of Oktagon MMA. He has previously competed under Fight Nation Championship (FNC), Bellator MMA, Absolute Championship Akhmat (ACA) and Babilon MMA.

== Professional career ==
=== Early career ===
Oniszczuk made his professional debut on March 12, 2016, against Bartosz Siwek. Oniszczuk won the fight via a Unanimous Decision.

His next fight came on October 15, 2016, against Dominik Szalczyk. Oniszczuk won the fight via a third-round TKO.

His next fight came on June 24, 2017, against Paweł Szaja. Oniszczuk won the fight via a Unanimous Decision.

=== Babilon MMA ===
Oniszczuk made his debut under Babilon MMA on December 2, 2017. His original opponent was scheduled to be Paweł Celiński, however, he pulled out due to an injury, with his replacement being Paweł Karwowski. Oniszczuk won the fight via a Unanimous Decision.

His next fight came on March 16, 2018, against Maksim Potapov. Oniszczuk won the fight via a submission just under a minute of the first round.

His next fight came on August 18, 2018, against Said-Magomed Abdulkadyrov. Oniszczuk won the fight via a Unanimous Decision.

His next fight came on January 25, 2019, against Guilherme Cadena. Oniszczuk won the fight via a TKO, after his opponent retired on the stool following the first round.

=== Absolute Championship Akhmat ===
Oniszczuk made his debut under Russian federation Absolute Championship Akhmat (ACA) on August 20, 2020, against Mindaugas Veržbickas. Oniszczuk lost the fight via a Unanimous Decision, suffering his first career defeat in the process.

His next fight came on November 26, 2020, against Krystian Bielski. Oniszczuk won the fight via a third-round knockout. This performance earned him his first career Knockout of the Night bonus.

His final fight with the federation came on December 4, 2021, against Vladimir Fedin. Oniszczuk won the fight via a first-round TKO.

=== Bellator MMA ===
On March 29, 2022, it was announced that Oniszczuk had signed with American federation Bellator MMA.

His debut came on October 29, 2022, against Costello van Steenis on the undercard of Bellator 287. Oniszczuk lost the fight via a second-round submission.

His final fight with the federation came on June 16, 2023, against Norbert Növényi Jr.. on the undercard of Bellator 297. Oniszczuk lost the fight via a first-round knockout.

=== CaveMMA ===
Oniszczuk returned to his native Poland, where he faced Carlo Prater on March 1, 2024, under the federation CaveMMA. Oniszczuk won the fight via a TKO less than a minute into the first round.

=== Fight Nation Championship ===
Oniszczuk made his debut under Croatian federation Fight Nation Championship (FNC) on November 23, 2024, against Andi Vrtačić. Oniszczuk lost the fight via a third-round TKO.

=== Oktagon MMA ===
Oniszczuk made his debut under Oktagon MMA on February 1, 2025. His debut was originally scheduled to be against Hojat Khajevand in a reserve bout for the Oktagon Middleweight Tournament. However, he was then moved to face Kerim Engizek in the main event of the event with the bout being in the opening round of the aforementioned tournament. The change was made after Engizek's original opponent, Anthony Salamone was forced to withdraw after failing doping tests, and being suspended by the French Anti-Doping Agency. Oniszczuk lost the fight via a Unanimous Decision.

His next fight came on August 9, 2025, against David Zawada. Oniszczuk won the fight via a Unanimous Decision.

His next fight came on January 17, 2026, against Marek Bartl. Oniszczuk won the fight via a second-round submission.

His next fight came on July 11, 2026, against Mick Stanton. Oniszczuk won the fight via a Unanimous Decision.

== Championships and accomplishments ==
=== Mixed martial arts ===
- Absolute Championship Akhmat
  - Knockout of the Night (One time)

== Mixed martial arts record ==
Professional record breakdown
18 matches	13 wins	5 losses
By knockout	5	2
By submission	2	1
By decision	6	2
By disqualification	0	0

Res.	Record	Opponent	Method	Event	Date	Round	Time	Location	Notes
Win	13–5	Mick Stanton	Decision (unanimous)	Oktagon 91	July 11, 2026	3	5:00	Cologne, Germany	
Win	12–5	Marek Bartl	Technical Submission (arm-triangle choke)	Oktagon 82	January 17, 2026	2	4:32	Düsseldorf, Germany	
Win	11–5	David Zawada	Decision (unanimous)	Oktagon 74	August 9, 2025	3	5:00	Prague, Czech Republic	Oktagon Middleweight Tournament Reserve bout.
Loss	10–5	Kerim Engizek	Decision (unanimous)	Oktagon 66	February 1, 2025	3	5:00	Düsseldorf, Germany	Oktagon Middleweight Tournament Round of 16.
Loss	10–4	Andi Vrtačić	TKO (punches)	FNC 20	November 23, 2024	3	2:28	Zagreb, Croatia	
Win	10–3	Carlo Prater	TKO (leg kick)	CAVEMMA 4	March 1, 2024	1	0:33	Jastrzębie-Zdrój, Poland	
Loss	9–3	Norbert Növényi Jr.	KO (punches)	Bellator 297	June 16, 2023	1	0:46	Chicago, Illinois, United States	
Loss	9–2	Costello van Steenis	Submission (brabo choke)	Bellator 287	October 29, 2022	2	3:02	Milan, Italy	
Win	9–1	Vladimir Fedin	TKO (body kick and punches)	ACA 133	December 4, 2021	1	1:24	Saint Petersburg, Russia	Middleweight debut.
Win	8–1	Krystian Bielski	KO (head kick)	ACA 114	November 25, 2020	3	1:52	Łódź, Poland	Knockout of the Night.
Loss	7–1	Mindaugas Veržbickas	Decision (unanimous)	ACA 109	August 20, 2020	3	5:00	Łódź, Poland	
Win	7–0	Guilherme Cadena	TKO (shoulder injury)	Babilon MMA 7	January 25, 2019	1	5:00	Żyrardów, Poland	
Win	6–0	Said-Magomed Abdulkadyrov	Decision (unanimous)	Babilon MMA 5	August 18, 2018	3	5:00	Międzyzdroje, Poland	
Win	5–0	Maksim Potapov	Submission (arm-triangle choke)	Babilon MMA 3	March 16, 2018	1	0:53	Radom, Poland	
Win	4–0	Paweł Karwowski	Decision (unanimous)	Babilon MMA 2	December 2, 2017	3	5:00	Legionowo, Poland	
Win	3–0	Paweł Szaja	Decision (unanimous)	MMA Way 1	June 24, 2017	3	5:00	Żary, Poland	
Win	2–0	Dominik Szalczyk	TKO (punches)	Gala Sportów Walki 7	October 15, 2016	3	3:20	Międzychód, Poland	
Win	1–0	Bartosz Siwek	Decision (unanimous)	Soul FC 4	March 12, 2016	3	5:00	Zielona Góra, Poland	Welterweight debut.

== See also ==
- List of male mixed martial artists
- List of current Oktagon MMA fighters
