= Will Fleury =

Irish mixed martial artist (born 1989)

- Born: 13 March 1989 (age 37); Cahir, County Tipperary, Ireland
- Nationality: Irish
- Height: 6 ft 3 in (191 cm)
- Weight: 205 lb (93 kg)
- Division: Heavyweight (2025 — present); Light heavyweight (2020, 2022 — present); Middleweight (2016 — 2021)
- Fighting out of: Ireland
- Team: SBG Ireland
- Years active: 2016–present

Mixed martial arts record
- Total: 22
- Wins: 17
- By knockout: 5
- By submission: 4
- By decision: 8
- Losses: 4
- By knockout: 2
- By submission: 1
- By decision: 1
- No contests: 1

Other information
- Mixed martial arts record from Sherdog

Will Fleury (born 13 March 1989) is an Irish professional mixed martial artist. He competes in Oktagon MMA, where he is the heavyweight champion and former light heavyweight champion. He has previously competed for organizations such as BAMMA, Bellator MMA, Brave Combat Federation (Brave CF) and Professional Fighters League (PFL).

== Mixed martial arts career ==
=== Early career ===
Fleury made his professional MMA debut on 2 April 2016 against John Redmond, at BFC 15, winning the bout by submission via arm-triangle choke.

In his next bout, Fleury faced Kyle McClurkin at BAMMA 28, winning the bout by TKO. He then competed at EFC 66 and Brave CF 10, winning both bouts.

=== Bellator MMA ===
Fleury made his Bellator debut against Alen Amedovski at Bellator 203 on 14 July 2018. He lost the fight via first-round knockout.

Fleury faced Shaun Taylor at Bellator 217 on 2 February 2019. He won the bout by submission in the second round.

Fleury faced Antonio Jones at Bellator 224 on 12 July 2019. He won the bout by unanimous decision.

Fleury faced Norbert Növényi Jr. on 27 September 2019, at Bellator 227. He lost the fight by unanimous decision.

Fleury faced Justin Moore at Bellator 240 on 22 February 2020. He won the bout by submission in the first round.

Fleury faced Kent Kauppinen on 26 September 2020, at Bellator Milan 2. He won the bout by unanimous decision.

=== Post Bellator career ===
Fleury faced Tarek Suleiman at UAE Warriors 28 on 26 March 2022. He won the bout by unanimous decision to become the inaugural middleweight champion.

=== Professional Fighters League ===
In his PFL debut, Fleury faced Anthony Salamone on 13 August 2022 at PFL 8. He won the bout by unanimous decision.

Fleury started the 2023 season against Krzysztof Jotko on 1 April 2023, at PFL 1. He initially won the bout via split decision. The result of the bout was later overturned to a no contest after Fluery tested positive for Drostanolone.

Fleury was scheduled to face Rob Wilkinson on 8 June 2023 at PFL 4. After Fleury had failed a commission drug test, he was replaced by Ty Flores. On May 31, it was revealed that Wilkinson also failed a drug test. Fleury and Wilkinson were later suspended 9 months and fined for their positive drug tests.

=== Oktagon MMA ===
Making his Oktagon MMA debut, Fleury faced Daniel Škvor on 20 April 2024, at Oktagon 56. He won the bout by submission in the second round.

Fleury faced Pavol Langer on 12 October 2024, at Oktagon 62. He won the bout by knockout in the first round.

Fleury faced Karlos Vémola for the Oktagon Light Heavyweight Championship on 29 December 2024, at Oktagon 65. He won the bout by unanimous decision to win the title.

Fleury faced Lazar Todev for the vacant Oktagon Heavyweight Championship on 8 March 2025, at Oktagon 68. He won the bout by unanimous decision to win the vacant title.

In his first heavyweight title defense, Fleury was reportedly to face Martin Buday on 4 October 2025, at Oktagon 77, but it did not materialize due to Fleury had been announced in advance that his cousin would be holding a wedding ceremony that day. The bout with Buday took place on 28 December 2025, at Oktagon 81. Fleury defended the title by TKO in the first round.

Fleury faced Kasim Aras for the heavyweight title on 20 June 2026, at Oktagon 90. He defended the title by knockout in the second round.

Fleury was scheduled to face Daniel Škvor for the light heavyweight title on 1 August 2026, at Oktagon 92. However, Škvor withdrew from the bout due to injury his pectoral muscle and was replaced by the interim Oktagon Middleweight Champion Makhmud Muradov (who moved up a weight class debut). Fleury lost the title by TKO in the second round.

== Championships and accomplishments ==
- Oktagon MMA
  - Oktagon Heavyweight Championship (One time, current)
  - Oktagon Light Heavyweight Championship (One time)
  - Second simultaneous two-weight Champion in Oktagon MMA history
- UAE Warriors
  - UAE Warriors Middleweight Championship (One time)

== Mixed martial arts record ==
Professional record breakdown
22 matches	17 wins	4 losses
By knockout	5	2
By submission	4	1
By decision	8	1
No contests	1	

Res.	Record	Opponent	Method	Event	Date	Round	Time	Location	Notes
Loss	17–4 (1)	Makhmud Muradov	TKO (punches)	Oktagon 92	August 1, 2026	2	0:19	Prague, Czech Republic	Lost the Oktagon Light Heavyweight Championship.
Win	17–3 (1)	Kasim Aras	KO (punch)	Oktagon 90	June 20, 2026	2	1:29	Berlin, Germany	Defended the Oktagon Heavyweight Championship.
Win	16–3 (1)	Martin Buday	TKO (punches)	Oktagon 81	December 28, 2025	1	1:40	Prague, Czech Republic	Defended the Oktagon Heavyweight Championship. Performance of the Night.
Win	15–3 (1)	Lazar Todev	Decision (unanimous)	Oktagon 68	March 8, 2025	5	5:00	Stuttgart, Germany	Heavyweight debut. Won the vacant Oktagon Heavyweight Championship.
Win	14–3 (1)	Karlos Vémola	Decision (unanimous)	Oktagon 65	December 29, 2024	5	5:00	Prague, Czech Republic	Won the Oktagon Light Heavyweight Championship.
Win	13–3 (1)	Pavol Langer	KO (punch)	Oktagon 62	October 12, 2024	1	1:31	Frankfurt, Germany	
Win	12–3 (1)	Daniel Škvor	Submission (arm-triangle choke)	Oktagon 56	April 20, 2024	2	1:14	Birmingham, England	
NC	11–3 (1)	Krzysztof Jotko	NC (overturned)	PFL 1 (2023)	April 1, 2023	3	5:00	Las Vegas, Nevada, United States	Originally a split decision win for Fleury; overturned after he tested positive for drostanolone.
Win	11–3	Anthony Salamone	Decision (unanimous)	PFL 8 (2022)	August 13, 2022	3	5:00	Cardiff, Wales	Return to Light Heavyweight.
Win	10–3	Tarek Suleiman	Decision (unanimous)	UAE Warriors 28	March 26, 2022	5	5:00	Abu Dhabi, United Arab Emirates	Won the inaugural UAE Warriors Middleweight Championship.
Win	9–3	Hojat Khajevand	Decision (unanimous)	EFM Show 2	September 11, 2021	3	5:00	Sofia, Bulgaria	
Win	8–3	Kent Kauppinen	Decision (unanimous)	Bellator Milan 2	September 26, 2020	3	5:00	Milan, Italy	Return to Middleweight.
Loss	7–3	Maciej Różański	Submission (arm-triangle choke)	EFM 3	June 20, 2020	2	4:00	Dortmund, Germany	Light Heavyweight debut. For the inaugural EFM Light Heavyweight Championship.
Win	7–2	Justin Moore	Submission (arm-triangle choke)	Bellator 240	February 20, 2020	1	4:14	Dublin, Ireland	
Loss	6–2	Norbert Növényi Jr.	Decision (unanimous)	Bellator 227	September 27, 2019	3	5:00	Dublin, Ireland	
Win	6–1	Antonio Jones	Decision (unanimous)	Bellator 224	July 12, 2019	3	5:00	Thackerville, Oklahoma, United States	Catchweight (190 lb) bout.
Win	5–1	Shaun Taylor	Submission (rear-naked choke)	Bellator 217	February 23, 2019	2	1:32	Dublin, Ireland	Catchweight (190.4 lb) bout; Taylor missed weight.
Loss	4–1	Alen Amedovski	KO (punches)	Bellator 203	July 14, 2018	1	1:39	Rome, Italy	
Win	4–0	Tarek Suleiman	Decision (unanimous)	Brave CF 10	March 2, 2018	3	5:00	Amman, Jordan	
Win	3–0	Gordon Roodman	TKO (punches)	EFC Worldwide 66	December 16, 2017	2	1:35	Pretoria, South Africa	
Win	2–0	Kyle McClurkin	TKO (punches)	BAMMA 28	February 24, 2017	1	2:49	Belfast, Northern Ireland	
Win	1–0	John Redmond	Submission (arm-triangle choke)	Battle Zone FC 15	April 2, 2016	1	N/A	Donaghmede, Ireland	Middleweight debut.
