= Norbert Növényi Jr. =

Hungarian mixed martial artist (born 1999)

- Born: Norbert Növényi Jr. 6 October 1999 (age 27); Budapest, Hungary
- Other names: Magic
- Height: 5 ft 11 in (1.80 m)
- Weight: 185 lb (84 kg; 13 st 3 lb)
- Division: Middleweight (2018–present)
- Reach: 75 in (191 cm)
- Fighting out of: London, England
- Team: London Shootfighters
- Years active: 2018–present

Mixed martial arts record
- Total: 12
- Wins: 11
- By knockout: 4
- By submission: 5
- By decision: 2
- By disqualification: 0
- Losses: 1
- By knockout: 0
- By submission: 0
- By decision: 1

Other information
- Mixed martial arts record from Sherdog

Norbert Növényi Jr. (born 6 October 1999) is a Hungarian professional mixed martial artist. He currently competes in the Middleweight division of Hexagone MMA. He has previously competed under Bellator MMA.

== Professional career ==
=== Early career ===
Növényi Jr. made his professional debut on February 10, 2018, against Ben Reeve. Növényi Jr. won the fight via a first-round submission.

=== Bellator MMA ===
Növényi made his debut under Bellator MMA on April 6, 2018, against Mehmet Yueksel on the undercard of Bellator 196. Növényi Jr. won the fight via a first-round submission.

Following this debut bout, he officially signed a contract with the federation three weeks later on April 28.

His next fight came on March 22, 2019, against William Lavine on the undercard of Bellator 218. Növényi Jr. won the fight via a second-round submission.

His next fight came on September 27, 2019, against Will Fleury on the undercard of Bellator 227. Növényi Jr. won the fight via a Unanimous Decision.

His next fight came over a year later on October 1, 2020, against Laïd Zerhouni on the undercard of Bellator 247. Növényi Jr. won the fight via a first-round submission.

He was scheduled to face Charlie Ward on November 5, 2021, on the undercard of Bellator 270. However, on October 6, he announced he has torn his ACL, and will be withdrawing from the fight, with his replacement being Fabian Edwards.

Following a three-year hiatus from fighting, it was announced that Növényi Jr. will be returning to fighting on February 25, 2023, against Andy Manzolo on the undercard of Bellator 291. Növényi Jr. won the fight via a first-round TKO.

His next fight came on June 16, 2023, against Kamil Oniszczuk on the undercard of Bellator 297. Növényi Jr. won the fight via a first-round knockout.

His final fight with the federation came on June 22, 2024, against Dalton Rosta on the undercard of Bellator Champions Series 3. Növényi Jr. lost the fight via a Majority Decision, suffering his first career defeat.

He officially departed from the federation on January 31, 2025.

=== Hexagone MMA ===
Növényi Jr. made his debut under French federation Hexagone MMA on April 12, 2025, against Arley Figueiredo. Növényi Jr. won the fight via a first-round TKO.

His next fight came on November 7, 2025, against Mădălin Pîrvulescu. Növényi Jr. won the fight via a first-round submission.

His next fight came on March 26, 2026, against Clement Giordanengo. Növényi Jr. won the fight via a first-round TKO.

He was scheduled to face Matthieu Duclos on June 12, 2026, but withdrew from the bout due to an injury.

=== Dana White's Contender Series ===
Növényi Jr. competed on Dana White's Contender Series 93 on September 22, 2026, against Theo Haig in the headliner. Despite winning, he was not offered a contract to the UFC.

== Personal life ==
He is the son of Olympic gold medalist Norbert Növényi.

== Mixed martial arts record ==
Professional record breakdown
12 matches	11 wins	1 loss
By knockout	4	0
By submission	5	0
By decision	2	1

Res.	Record	Opponent	Method	Event	Date	Round	Time	Location	Notes
Win	11–1	Theo Haig	Decision (unanimous)	Dana White's Contender Series 93	September 22, 2026	3	5:00	Las Vegas, Nevada, United States	
Win	10–1	Clement Giordanengo	TKO (punches)	Hexagone MMA 42	March 26, 2026	1	4:39	Nantes, France	Hexagone MMA Middleweight Tournament Semifinal.
Win	9–1	Mădălin Pîrvulescu	Submission (triangle choke)	Hexagone MMA 36	November 7, 2025	1	1:36	Székesfehérvár, Hungary	Hexagone MMA Middleweight Tournament Quarterfinal.
Win	8–1	Arley Figueiredo	TKO (punches)	Hexagone MMA 26	April 12, 2025	1	3:53	Győr, Hungary	
Loss	7–1	Dalton Rosta	Decision (majority)	Bellator Champions Series 3	June 22, 2024	3	5:00	Dublin, Ireland	
Win	7–0	Kamil Oniszczuk	KO (punches)	Bellator 297	June 16, 2023	1	0:46	Chicago, Illinois, United States	
Win	6–0	Andy Manzolo	TKO (punch)	Bellator 291	February 25, 2023	1	3:12	Dublin, Ireland	
Win	5–0	Laïd Zerhouni	Submission (triangle choke)	Bellator 247	October 1, 2020	1	4:36	Milan, Italy	
Win	4–0	Will Fleury	Decision (unanimous)	Bellator 227	September 27, 2019	3	5:00	Dublin, Ireland	
Win	3–0	William Lavine	Submission (arm-triangle choke)	Bellator 218	March 22, 2019	2	4:05	Thackerville, Oklahoma, United States	
Win	2–0	Mehmet Yueksel	Submission (rear-naked choke)	Bellator 196	April 6, 2018	1	4:42	Budapest, Hungary	
Win	1–0	Ben Reeve	Submission (rear-naked choke)	Ultimate Challenge MMA 54	February 10, 2018	1	0:27	London, England	Middleweight debut.

== See also ==
- List of male mixed martial artists
