= UFD Gym =

Mixed martial arts training organization in Düsseldorf, Germany

University Of Fighting Düsseldorf (UFD)
- Est.: 2013
- Founded by: Ivan and Tomislav Dijaković
- Primary trainers: Sukru Asku (boxing); Ivan Hyppolyte (MMA); Leozada Nogueira; (BJJ)
- Website: ufd-gym.de

University of Fighting in Düsseldorf (UFD Gym) is a professional martial arts gym situated in Düsseldorf, Germany. It was founded in 2013 by brothers Ivan and Tomislav Dijaković. In 2016 they were voted the best MMA Gym in Germany by the German martial arts portal GNP1.de. In 2017 UFD Gym was voted as "the best gym of the year in Germany" by the German web portal GFN (German Fight News).

UFD Gym features professional fighters who have competed in promotions such as the Ultimate Fighting Championship (UFC), Konfrontacja Sztuk Walki (KSW), Professional Fighters League (PFL) and Final Fight Championship (FFC). It also features professional boxers including World Boxing Association heavyweight champion Manuel Charr and European EBU heavyweight champion Agit Kabayel.

== Notable students ==
- Hector Lombard
- Thiago Silva
- Roberto Soldić
- David Zawada
- Geard Ajetovic
- Manuel Charr
- Agit Kabayel
- Erko Jun

== Awards ==
- 2016 The best fighting gym in Germany
- 2017 The best gym in Germany
