= Martin Buday =

Slovak mixed martial artist (born 1991)

- Born: November 11, 1991 (age 34); Nitra, Czechoslovakia
- Other names: Badys
- Height: 6 ft 5 in (1.96 m)
- Weight: 266 lb (121 kg; 19 st 0 lb)
- Division: Heavyweight
- Reach: 77 in (196 cm)
- Fighting out of: Trnava, Slovakia
- Team: Spartakus Fight Gym
- Years active: 2017–present

Mixed martial arts record
- Total: 20
- Wins: 16
- By knockout: 7
- By submission: 2
- By decision: 7
- Losses: 4
- By knockout: 2
- By decision: 2

Other information
- Mixed martial arts record from Sherdog

Martin Buday (born November 11, 1991) is a Slovak mixed martial artist. He competes in the heavyweight division of the Oktagon MMA, where he is a former Oktagon Heavyweight Champion. He previously competed in Ultimate Fighting Championship (UFC).

== Background ==
Buday was born in Nitra, Czechoslovakia (now Slovakia). He started martial arts at the age of eighteen to lose weight. He started his first practiced as a Brazilian jiu-jitsu, which he trained at the Gracie Barra Pitbull club in Nitra. He was successful in this sport and placed in various European tournaments, with his greatest achievement being two gold medals from the European IBJJF Championships at the blue and purple belt levels. He later switched to MMA, which he began training under former Bellator Light Heavyweight Champion Attila Végh at Spartakus Fight Gym.

== Mixed martial arts career ==
=== Early career ===
Buday started in professional career in 2015, he fought exclusively regional Slovakia promotion and Oktagon MMA, where he acquired a 8–1 record and Won his the Oktagon Heavyweight Championship before his fight at Dana White's Contender Series.

=== Dana White's Contender Series ===
In June 2021, it was reported that Buday had received an invitation to Dana White's Contender Series, which fighters compete for a chance to earn a UFC contract. His fight took place on October 12, 2021, and he was originally supposed to face Hugo Cunha, but he withdrew and was replaced by Lorenzo Hood. He won the fight via technical knockout in round one and he was awarded a UFC contract.

=== Ultimate Fighting Championship ===
In his promotional debut, Buday faced Chris Barnett on April 16, 2022, at UFC on ESPN 34. He won the fight via technical unanimous decision after Barnett rendered unable to continue due to an unintentional elbow to the back of the head in the third round.

Buday faced Łukasz Brzeski on August 13, 2022, at UFC on ESPN 41. He won the fight via split decision. 12 out of 13 media outlets scored the bout for Brzeski.

Buday was scheduled to face Jake Collier on April 15, 2023, at UFC on ESPN 44. However, the bout was moved to UFC on ESPN 45 on April 29, 2023, for unknown reasons. He won the fight via unanimous decision.

Buday faced Josh Parisian on August 12, 2023, at UFC on ESPN 51. He won the fight via a kimura in round one.

Buday faced Shamil Gaziev on December 16, 2023, at UFC 296. He lost the fight via technical knockout in round two.

Buday faced Andrei Arlovski on June 15, 2024, at UFC on ESPN 58. However, the bout was moved to UFC 303 on June 29, 2024, for unknown reasons. He won the fight via split decision. 7 out of 12 media outlets scored the fight for Arlovski.

Buday was scheduled to face Rizvan Kuniev on December 7, 2024, at UFC 310. However, Buday withdrew due to an injury and the bout was removed from the card.

Buday was scheduled to face Kennedy Nzechukwu on April 5, 2025, at UFC on ESPN 65. However, Nzechukwu was removed from the event due to injury and replaced by Uran Satybaldiev. He won the fight via unanimous decision.

Buday faced Marcus Buchecha on July 26, 2025, at UFC on ABC 9. He won the fight via unanimous decision.

On July 31, 2025, it was reported that Buday was removed from the UFC roster after completing the final bout of his contract and was not renewed.

=== Return to Oktagon MMA ===
On August 9, 2025, during Oktagon 74, Buday announced that he'd re-signed with Oktagon MMA.

Buday was reportedly to face Will Fleury for the Oktagon Heavyweight Championship on October 4, 2025, at Oktagon 77, but it never materialized due to Fleury had been announced in advance that his cousin would be holding a wedding ceremony that day. The bout with Fleury took place on December 28, 2025, at Oktagon 81. He lost the fight via technical knockout in round one.

Buday faced Lazar Todev on June 6, 2026, at Oktagon 89. He lost the fight via unanimous decision.

== Personal life ==
Buday's father died in late June 2024, a few days prior to Buday's bout with Andre Arlovski.

== Championships and accomplishments ==
- Oktagon MMA
  - Oktagon Heavyweight Championship (One time)

== Mixed martial arts record ==
Professional record breakdown
20 matches	16 wins	4 losses
By knockout	7	2
By submission	2	0
By decision	7	2

Res.	Record	Opponent	Method	Event	Date	Round	Time	Location	Notes
Loss	16–4	Lazar Todev	Decision (unanimous)	Oktagon 89	June 6, 2026	3	5:00	Bratislava, Slovakia	
Loss	16–3	Will Fleury	TKO (punches)	Oktagon 81	December 28, 2025	1	1:40	Prague, Czech Republic	For the Oktagon Heavyweight Championship.
Win	16–2	Marcus Buchecha	Decision (unanimous)	UFC on ABC: Whittaker vs. de Ridder	July 26, 2025	3	5:00	Abu Dhabi, United Arab Emirates	
Win	15–2	Uran Satybaldiev	Decision (unanimous)	UFC on ESPN: Emmett vs. Murphy	April 5, 2025	3	5:00	Las Vegas, Nevada, United States	
Win	14–2	Andrei Arlovski	Decision (split)	UFC 303	June 29, 2024	3	5:00	Las Vegas, Nevada, United States	
Loss	13–2	Shamil Gaziev	TKO (punches)	UFC 296	December 16, 2023	2	0:56	Las Vegas, Nevada, United States	
Win	13–1	Josh Parisian	Submission (kimura)	UFC on ESPN: Luque vs. dos Anjos	August 12, 2023	1	4:11	Las Vegas, Nevada, United States	
Win	12–1	Jake Collier	Decision (unanimous)	UFC on ESPN: Song vs. Simón	April 29, 2023	3	5:00	Las Vegas, Nevada, United States	
Win	11–1	Łukasz Brzeski	Decision (split)	UFC on ESPN: Vera vs. Cruz	August 13, 2022	3	5:00	San Diego, California, United States	
Win	10–1	Chris Barnett	Technical Decision (unanimous)	UFC on ESPN: Luque vs. Muhammad 2	April 16, 2022	3	1:37	Las Vegas, Nevada, United States	An inadvertent elbow to the back of head rendered Barnett unable to continue.
Win	9–1	Lorenzo Hood	TKO (knee)	Dana White's Contender Series 43	October 12, 2021	1	4:56	Las Vegas, Nevada, United States	
Win	8–1	Kamil Minda	KO (punches)	Oktagon 25	June 19, 2021	2	4:41	Brno, Czech Republic	Won the vacant Oktagon Heavyweight Championship.
Win	7–1	Daniel Dittrich	Submission (kimura)	Oktagon 14	September 14, 2019	2	1:13	Bratislava, Slovakia	
Win	6–1	Yevhen Orlov	TKO (punches)	Oktagon Prime 1	April 26, 2019	1	3:32	Košice, Slovakia	
Win	5–1	José Rodrigo Guelke	TKO (retirement)	Spartakus Fight Gym: Night of Champions 5	October 26, 2018	2	5:00	Trnava, Slovakia	
Win	4–1	Łukasz Łysoniewski	TKO (punches)	Oktagon 9	September 15, 2018	1	4:45	Bratislava, Slovakia	
Win	3–1	Dzhangir Nasibov	TKO (retirement)	Oktagon 6	May 26, 2018	1	5:00	Košice, Slovakia	
Win	2–1	Milan Vrbić	TKO (submission to punchea)	X Fight Nights 9	April 21, 2018	2	4:05	Nitra, Slovakia	Return to Heavyweight.
Loss	1–1	Juan Espino	Decision (unanimous)	FECALUMA: MMA-K1-BJJ	October 14, 2017	3	5:00	Santa Cruz de Tenerife, Spain	Super Heavyweight debut.
Win	1–0	Uroš Stefanović	Decision (unanimous)	Fight of Gladiators: Night of Champions 2	October 23, 2015	2	5:00	Trnava, Slovakia	Heavyweight debut.

== See also ==
- List of current Oktagon MMA fighters
- List of male mixed martial artists
