= Erko Jun =

Bosnian mixed martial artist (born 1990)

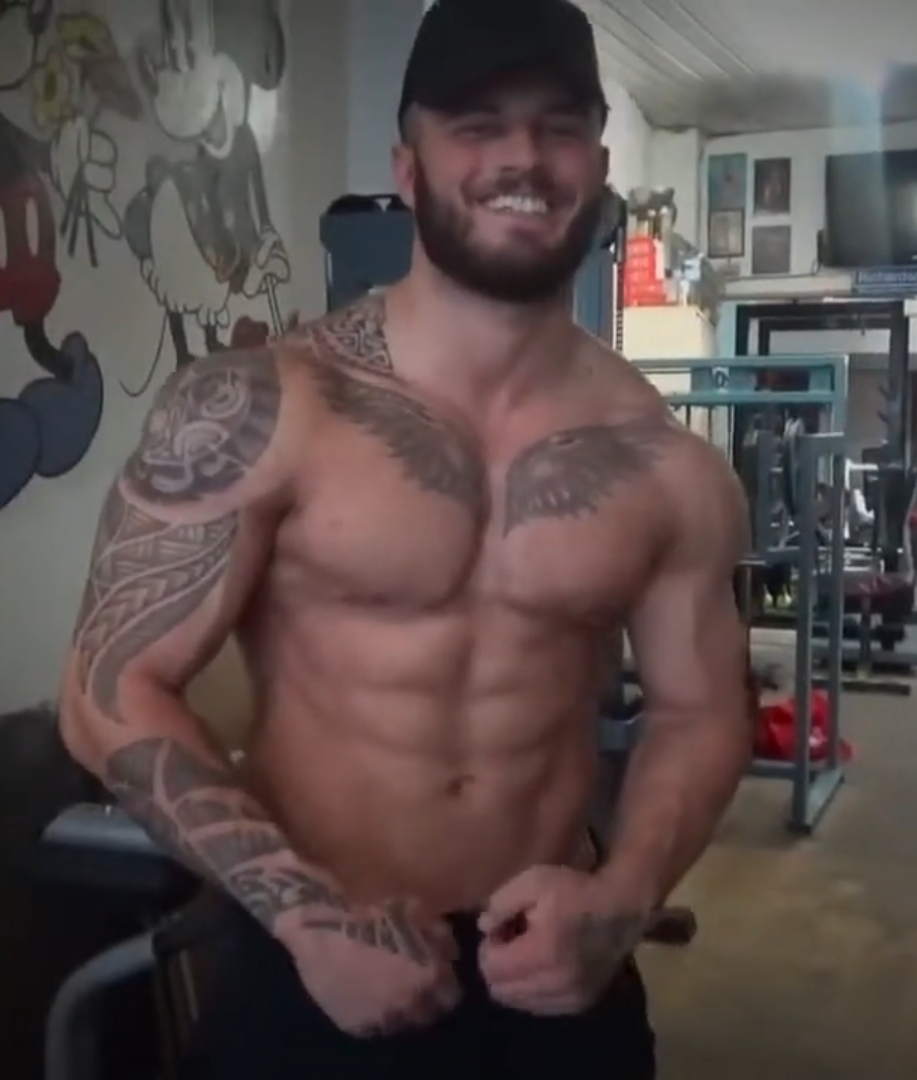
- Born: June 28, 1990 (age 36); Janja, Bosnia and Herzegovina
- Other names: The Bounty Hunter
- Height: 5 ft 10 in (1.78 m)
- Weight: 205 lb (93 kg; 14 st 9 lb)
- Division: Light Heavyweight (2021–present); Heavyweight (2018–2020)
- Reach: 72 in (183 cm)
- Style: Kickboxing
- Stance: Orthodox
- Fighting out of: Antwerp, Belgium
- Team: UFD Gym; Combat Brothers; Celtix Gym
- Years active: 2018–present

Kickboxing record
- Total: 2
- Losses: 2
- By knockout: 1

Mixed martial arts record
- Total: 13
- Wins: 9
- By knockout: 9
- Losses: 4
- By knockout: 4

Other information
- Mixed martial arts record from Sherdog

Erko Jun (born June 28, 1990) is a Bosnian professional mixed martial artist. He currently competes in the Light Heavyweight division for Brave Combat Federation where he is the former Brave CF Light Heavyweight Champion.

== Professional career ==
=== Konfrontacja Sztuk Walki ===
Jun made his professional debut on 9 June 2018 for Polish promotion, Konfrontacja Sztuk Walki. He faced Tomasz Oświeciński, whom he would beat via a first round Knockout. This win would also see him earning a Knockout of the Night bonus.

His next fight would come four months later, where he took on Polish rapper, Paweł "Popek" Mikołajuw. Jun would win via TKO in the second round.

After a seven month hiatus, Jun would return in a bout against Akop Szostak. Jun would win the fight via TKO within the first minute of the first round.

Almost half a year later, Jun would return in a bout against decorated Polish strongman, Mariusz Pudzianowski. Jun would suffer his first defeat after a second round TKO. This would also mark Jun's last fight with the promotion.

=== Elite MMA Championship ===
Jun would make his debut with German promotion, Elite MMA Championship on 5 September 2020 in a bout against Damian Olszewski. Jun would lose the fight via Knockout thirty seconds into the fight.

After over a year out of the cage, Jun would return in a bout against Italy's Gianluca Locicero. Jun would return to the win column after winning via TKO within the first minute of the first round.

Jun would return four months later in a bout against Poland's Szymon Wrzesień. Jun would win the fight via TKO twelve seconds into the third round. This would also mark his last fight with the promotion.

=== Brave Combat Federation ===
A year later, Jun would have his first fight under the Brave Combat Federation promotion, when he took on Slovenia's Marko Drmonjič in the main event of Brace CF 70. Jun would win the fight via TKO in the first round.

=== Prime Show MMA ===
After a nine month hiatus, Jun would return to the cage. He would return to Poland and fight under the promotion Prime Show MMA. He fought Paweł Trybała, who he would knock out in just under a minute in the first round.

=== Return to Brave CF ===
Jun would return to Brave CF three months later, where he took on Algeria's Mohamed Said Maalem. Jun would win via TKO in the first round.

==== Brave CF Light Heavyweight Champion ====
Five months after his last fight, Jun would face Germany's Alexander Wesner for the vacant Brave CF Light Heavyweight Championship. Jun would win the fight via TKO in the fourth round, and thus winning the title, and claiming his first career championship.

Jun later fought for the middleweight belt, facing Mohammad Fakhreddine. He lost this fight via a first-round knockout.

== Kickboxing career ==
Jun made his kickboxing debut against Russia's Vladimir Mineev on 16 September 2022. Jun would lose the fight via a Referee Stoppage in the third round.

== Karate Combat career ==
Jun made his debut under Karate Combat on December 5, 2025 against Montè Deon Ogbonna-Morrison. Jun lost the fight via a third-round TKO.

== Championships and accomplishments ==
=== Mixed martial arts ===
- Brave Combat Federation
  - Brave CF Light Heavyweight Championship (One time)
- Konfrontacja Sztuk Walki
  - Knockout of the Night (One time) vs. Tomasz Oświeciński

== Mixed martial arts record ==
Professional record breakdown
13 matches	9 wins	4 losses
By knockout	9	4

Res.	Record	Opponent	Method	Event	Date	Round	Time	Location	Notes
Loss	9–4	Mohamed Said Maalem	TKO (punches)	Brave CF 106	June 6, 2026	4	2:19	Ljubljana, Slovenia	Lost the Brave CF Light Heavyweight Championship.
Loss	9–3	Mohammad Fakhreddine	KO (punch)	Brave CF 96	June 7, 2025	1	4:43	Ljubljana, Slovenia	Middleweight debut. For the vacant Brave CF Middleweight Championship.
Win	9–2	Alexander Wesner	TKO (leg kick and punches)	Brave CF 88	September 28, 2024	4	1:27	Ljubljana, Slovenia	Won the vacant Brave CF Light Heavyweight Championship.
Win	8–2	Mohamed Said Maalem	KO (punches)	Brave CF 81	April 20, 2024	1	3:06	Ljubljana, Slovenia	
Win	7–2	Paweł Trybała	KO (punch)	Prime Show MMA 7	January 13, 2024	1	0:57	Koszalin, Poland	
Win	6–2	Marko Drmonjič	TKO (punches)	Brave CF 70	April 23, 2023	1	2:52	Ljubljana, Slovenia	
Win	5–2	Szymon Wrzesień	TKO (punches)	Elite MMA Championship 9	April 16, 2022	3	0:12	Düsseldorf, Germany	Catchweight (225 lb) bout.
Win	4–2	Gianluca Locicero	TKO (leg kicks)	Elite MMA Championship 8	December 4, 2021	1	0:39	Düsseldorf, Germany	Light Heavyweight debut.
Loss	3–2	Damian Olszewski	KO (punch)	Elite MMA Championship 5	September 5, 2020	1	0:36	Düsseldorf, Germany	
Loss	3–1	Mariusz Pudzianowski	TKO (punches)	KSW 51	November 9, 2019	2	1:43	Zagreb, Croatia	
Win	3–0	Akop Szostak	TKO (punches)	KSW 49	May 18, 2019	1	0:37	Gdańsk, Poland	
Win	2–0	Paweł Mikołajuw	TKO (punches)	KSW 45	October 6, 2018	2	2:08	London, England	
Win	1–0	Tomasz Oświeciński	KO (punch)	KSW 44	June 9, 2018	1	2:21	Gdańsk, Poland	Heavyweight debut. Knockout of the Night.

== Kickboxing record ==
Professional kickboxing record
0 Wins (0 (T)KOs), 2 Losses, 0 Draw
Date	Result	Opponent	Event	Location	Method	Round	Time
2026-10-17	Loss	(Poland) Michał Pasternak	Fame 33: Grand Freaks	Warsaw, Poland	Decision (majority)	3	3:00
2022-09-16	Loss	(Russia) Vladimir Mineev	Cup of Lotus	Elista, Russia	TKO (Referee stoppage)	3	2:46

== Karate Combat record ==
Professional record breakdown
1 match	0 wins	1 loss
By knockout	0	1
By decision	0	0

Res.	Record	Opponent	Method	Event	Date	Round	Time	Location	Notes
Loss	0–1	Montè Deon Ogbonna-Morrison	TKO (punches)	Karate Combat 58	December 5, 2025	3	0:28	Doral, Florida, United States	
