= UFC on ESPN: Nicolau vs. Perez =

2024 mixed martial event in Nevada, US

- The poster for UFC on ESPN: Nicolau vs. Perez
- Promotion: Ultimate Fighting Championship
- Date: April 27, 2024
- Venue: UFC Apex
- City: Enterprise, Nevada, United States
- Attendance: Not announced

Event chronology
UFC 300: Pereira vs. Hill	UFC on ESPN: Nicolau vs. Perez	UFC 301: Pantoja vs. Erceg

UFC on ESPN: Nicolau vs. Perez (also known as UFC on ESPN 55 and UFC Vegas 91) was a mixed martial arts event produced by the Ultimate Fighting Championship that took place on April 27, 2024, at the UFC Apex facility, in Enterprise, Nevada, part of the Las Vegas Metropolitan Area, United States.

== Background ==
A flyweight rematch between former Rizin Bantamweight Champion Manel Kape and Matheus Nicolau was expected to headline the event. The pairing previously met at UFC Fight Night: Edwards vs. Muhammad in March 2021 which Nicolau won by controversial split decision. Their second meeting was previously scheduled for UFC Fight Night: Ankalaev vs. Walker 2 in January 2024 but Kape missed weight and the bout was subsequently cancelled. In turn, Kape pulled out due to a rib injury and was replaced by former UFC Flyweight Championship challenger Alex Perez.

A lightweight bout between Road to UFC Season 1 lightweight winner Anshul Jubli and Maheshate Hayisaer was scheduled for this event. However, Jubli pulled out for unknown reasons and was replaced by Gabriel Benítez.

A lightweight bout between James Llontop and Lando Vannata was scheduled for this event. However, Vannata pulled out for unknown reasons and was replaced by Gabriel Green. Green was also withdrew from the bout for unknown reasons and he was replaced by newcomer Chris Padilla.

Joel Álvarez and Mateusz Rębecki were expected to meet in a lightweight bout. However, Álvarez pulled out due to undisclosed reasons. Rębecki instead faced Carlos Diego Ferreira at UFC on ESPN: Lewis vs. Nascimento on May 11.

At the weigh-ins, James Llontop and David Onama missed weight. Llontop weighed in at 156.5 pounds, half a pound over the lightweight non-title fight limit. Onama weighed in at 148.5 pounds, two and a half pounds over the featherweight non-title fight limit. Both bouts proceeded at catchweight with both fighters forfeiting 20% of their purses, which went to their opponents Chris Padilla and Jonathan Pearce, respectively.

== Results ==
Main card (ESPN / ESPN+)
Weight class				Method	Round	Time	Notes
Flyweight	Alex Perez	def.	Matheus Nicolau	KO (punch)	2	2:16
Light Heavyweight	Bogdan Guskov	def.	Ryan Spann	TKO (punches)	2	3:16
Women's Flyweight	Karine Silva	def.	Ariane Lipski	Decision (unanimous) (30–27, 29–28, 29–28)	3	5:00
Heavyweight	Jhonata Diniz	def.	Austen Lane	KO (punches)	2	2:12
Catchweight (148.5 lb)	David Onama	def.	Jonathan Pearce	Decision (unanimous) (29–28, 29–28, 29–28)	3	5:00
Welterweight	Uroš Medić	def.	Tim Means	TKO (punches)	1	2:09
Preliminary card (ESPN2 / ESPN+)
Bantamweight	Victor Henry	def.	Rani Yahya	TKO (head kick and punches)	3	2:36
Lightweight	Austin Hubbard	def.	Michał Figlak	Decision (unanimous) (29–28, 29–28, 29–28)	3	5:00
Heavyweight	Don'Tale Mayes	def.	Caio Machado	Decision (unanimous) (29–28, 29–28, 29–28)	3	5:00
Women's Strawweight	Ketlen Souza	def.	Marnic Mann	Decision (unanimous) (30–27, 30–27, 30–27)	3	5:00
Catchweight (156.5 lb)	Chris Padilla	def.	James Llontop	Submission (rear-naked choke)	1	4:33
Women's Flyweight	Ivana Petrović	def.	Liang Na	Submission (arm-triangle choke)	3	1:29
Lightweight	Maheshate Hayisaer	def.	Gabriel Benítez	Decision (split) (28–29, 29–28, 29–28)	3	5:00

== Bonus awards ==
The following fighters received $50,000 bonuses.

- Fight of the Night: No bonus awarded.
- Performance of the Night: Alex Perez, Bogdan Guskov, Jhonata Diniz, and Uroš Medić

== Aftermath ==
As the starting ring announcer Joe Martinez became ill during the event, UFC's roving reporter Charly Arnolt replaced him briefly and became the first female ring announcer in the promotion's history.

== See also ==
- 2024 in UFC
- List of current UFC fighters
- List of UFC events
