= Ashley Yoder =

American mixed martial artist (born 1987)

- Born: October 20, 1987 (age 39); Indianapolis, Indiana, United States
- Other names: Spider Monkey
- Height: 5 ft 7 in (1.70 m)
- Weight: 115 lb (52 kg; 8 st 3 lb)
- Division: Strawweight
- Reach: 69 1/2 in (177 cm)
- Fighting out of: Temecula, California, United States
- Team: Team Atchison Martial Arts (2008–2012); Team Quest (2012–present) Checkmat Murrieta
- Rank: Black belt in Brazilian Jiu-Jitsu under Ricardo Feliciano
- Years active: 2008–present

Mixed martial arts record
- Total: 20
- Wins: 9
- By submission: 4
- By decision: 5
- Losses: 11
- By decision: 11

Other information
- University: Indiana University Bloomington
- Mixed martial arts record from Sherdog

Ashley Yoder (born October 20, 1987) is an American mixed martial artist and competes in Strawweight division. A professional since 2008, Yoder is most known for her time in the Ultimate Fighting Championship (UFC).

== Biography ==
Yoder was born on October 20, 1987, in Indianapolis, Indiana, United States. At the age of three, her parents got divorced and she and her brother were raised by her mother. During her high school years at Mitchell High School (Indiana), Yoder was involved in cheerleading, dance and competed in track and field. She attended Indiana University Bloomington and received two bachelor's degrees in Criminal Justice and African American Diaspora Studies.

Prior to starting to fight professionally, Yoder worked as a lifeguard.

== Mixed martial arts career ==
=== Early career ===
On her 18th birthday, Yoder lost her brother in a car accident, followed by the death of her cousin two years later. She started training in MMA after a friend introduced her to the combat sport. Yoder only fell in love with mixed martial arts after she had her first fight. Prior to that, she mainly used MMA as a channel to vent out her anger of the loss of her brother.

Yoder participated in the UFC's The Ultimate Fighter 20 tryouts, but did not make the cut to be a cast member. She attempted to make it into the show again in April 2016, trying out for TUF 23. Yoder was chosen to appear on that season of TUF, and was signed by UFC later that year.

Yoder fought most of her fights in the California circuit under BAMMA USA, Invicta and Gladiator Challenge promotions and amassed a record of 5–1 prior joining UFC.

=== The Ultimate Fighter ===
Yoder competed in the strawweight tournament under Joanna Jędrzejczyk's team on the Ultimate Fighting Championship (UFC) produced reality television series The Ultimate Fighter (TUF) 23, also known as The Ultimate Fighter: Team Joanna vs. Team Cláudia. Yoder took on Jodie Esquibel in round 1 and won the fight via split decision. Yoder moved on to face Kate Jackson, where she lost the fight via unanimous decision.

=== Ultimate Fighting Championship ===
Yoder made her promotional debut on December 9, 2016, at UFC Fight Night: Lewis vs. Abdurakhimov in Albany, New York against Justine Kish. At the weight-in Kish came in at 116.4 Ibs, over the strawweight limit of 116 Ibs, and she was fined 20% of her pay to Yoder. She lost the fight via unanimous decision with the scorecards 29-28 across the board.

Yoder faced Angela Hill on July 7, 2017, at The Ultimate Fighter 25 Finale. She lost the fight by unanimous decision.

Yoder faced promotional newcomer Mackenzie Dern on March 3, 2018, at UFC 222. She lost the fight via split decision.

Yoder faced Amanda Cooper on November 10, 2018 UFC Fight Night 139. She won the fight via a split decision.

Yoder faced Syuri Kondo on June 22, 2019, at UFC Fight Night 153. She won the fight via unanimous decision.

Yoder was scheduled to face Yan Xiaonan on October 26, 2019, at UFC Fight Night 162. However, Yan pulled out of the fight in late-September citing a foot injury. She was replaced by Randa Markos. She lost the fight via split decision.

As the first fight of her new four-fight contract, Yoder faced Lívia Renata Souza on August 15, 2020, at UFC 252. She lost the fight via unanimous decision.

Yoder faced Miranda Granger on November 14, 2020, at UFC Fight Night: Felder vs. dos Anjos. She won the fight via unanimous decision.

Yoder was scheduled to face Angela Hill in a rematch on February 27, 2021, at UFC Fight Night 186. However, day of the fight it was announced that the bout was scrapped due to safety protocols after one of Yoder's cornermen tested positive for COVID-19. The bout was rescheduled and took place at UFC Fight Night: Edwards vs. Muhammad on March 13. Yoder lost the fight via unanimous decision.

Yoder faced Jinh Yu Frey on July 31, 2021, at UFC on ESPN 28. She lost the fight via unanimous decision.

As the first bout of her new four-fight contract, Yoder was scheduled to face Vanessa Demopoulos on January 15, 2022, at UFC on ESPN 32. However, Yoder withdrew from the event for undisclosed reasons and she was replaced by Silvana Gómez Juárez.

After a two-year layoff, Yoder faced Emily Ducote on October 14, 2023, at UFC Fight Night 230. She lost the fight via unanimous decision.

On October 25, 2023, it was announced that Yoder was no longer on the UFC roster.

=== Post-UFC career ===
Yoder made her first appearance outside the UFC at LFA 190 against fellow UFC veteran Gloria de Paula on August 23, 2024. She won the fight via unanimous decision.

== Professional grappling career ==
Yoder represented Team Patriot Empowerment in a Combat Jiu-Jitsu team tournament at Subversiv 10 on April 13, 2024. She lost her only match to Alex Enriquez by submission and her team were eliminated.

Yoder then defeated Taylor Mauldin by decision at Subversiv: Fight Club 1 on March 8, 2025.

== Personal life ==
Yoder is a dog lover and owns a dog named "Beth".

== Mixed martial arts record ==
Professional record breakdown
20 matches	9 wins	11 losses
By submission	4	0
By decision	5	11

Res.	Record	Opponent	Method	Event	Date	Round	Time	Location	Notes
Loss	9–11	Hilarie Rose	Decision (split)	Cage Titans 77	July 18, 2026	3	5:00	Plymouth, Massachusetts, United States	
Loss	9–10	Natalia Kuziutina	Decision (split)	Tuff-N-Uff 144	May 22, 2025	3	5:00	San Diego, California, United States	
Win	9–9	Gloria de Paula	Decision (unanimous)	LFA 190	August 23, 2024	3	5:00	Commerce, California, United States	
Loss	8–9	Emily Ducote	Decision (unanimous)	UFC Fight Night: Yusuff vs. Barboza	October 14, 2023	3	5:00	Las Vegas, Nevada, United States	
Loss	8–8	Jinh Yu Frey	Decision (unanimous)	UFC on ESPN: Hall vs. Strickland	July 31, 2021	3	5:00	Las Vegas, Nevada, United States	
Loss	8–7	Angela Hill	Decision (unanimous)	UFC Fight Night: Edwards vs. Muhammad	March 13, 2021	3	5:00	Las Vegas, Nevada, United States	
Win	8–6	Miranda Granger	Decision (unanimous)	UFC Fight Night: Felder vs. dos Anjos	November 14, 2020	3	5:00	Las Vegas, Nevada, United States	
Loss	7–6	Lívia Renata Souza	Decision (unanimous)	UFC 252	August 15, 2020	3	5:00	Las Vegas, Nevada, United States	
Loss	7–5	Randa Markos	Decision (split)	UFC Fight Night: Maia vs. Askren	October 26, 2019	3	5:00	Kallang, Singapore	
Win	7–4	Syuri Kondo	Decision (unanimous)	UFC Fight Night: Moicano vs. The Korean Zombie	June 22, 2019	3	5:00	Greenville, South Carolina, United States	
Win	6–4	Amanda Cooper	Decision (split)	UFC Fight Night: The Korean Zombie vs. Rodríguez	November 10, 2018	3	5:00	Denver, Colorado, United States	
Loss	5–4	Mackenzie Dern	Decision (split)	UFC 222	March 3, 2018	3	5:00	Las Vegas, Nevada, United States	
Loss	5–3	Angela Hill	Decision (unanimous)	The Ultimate Fighter: Redemption Finale	July 7, 2017	3	5:00	Las Vegas, Nevada, United States	
Loss	5–2	Justine Kish	Decision (unanimous)	UFC Fight Night: Lewis vs. Abdurakhimov	December 9, 2016	3	5:00	Albany, New York, United States	
Win	5–1	Amber Brown	Submission (armbar)	Invicta FC 20	November 18, 2016	2	2:31	Kansas City, Missouri, United States	Catchweight (117 lb) bout; Yoder missed weight.
Win	4–1	Angela Danzig	Submission (armbar)	BAMMA USA: Badbeat 17	October 2, 2015	1	4:50	Commerce, California, United States	
Win	3–1	Liz Tracy	Decision (split)	BAMMA USA: Badbeat 16	June 9, 2015	3	5:00	Commerce, California, United States	Catchweight (118 lb) bout.
Win	2–1	Misha Nassiri	Submission (armbar)	BAMMA USA: Badbeat 14	January 9, 2015	1	1:02	Commerce, California, United States	
Loss	1–1	Maria Rios	Decision (unanimous)	BAMMA USA: Badbeat 13	October 10, 2014	3	3:00	Commerce, California, United States	
Win	1–0	Catalina Madril	Submission (armbar)	Gladiator Challenge: Uprising	February 1, 2014	1	0:15	San Jacinto, California, United States	

== See also ==
- List of female mixed martial artists
