= David Dvořák =

Czech professional mixed martial artist

- Born: David Dvořák; June 5, 1992 (age 34); Hořice, Czech Republic
- Other names: Undertaker
- Height: 5 ft 5 in (1.65 m)
- Weight: 125 lb (57 kg; 8.9 st)
- Division: Flyweight
- Reach: 68 in (173 cm)
- Stance: Orthodox
- Fighting out of: Hradec Králové, Czech Republic
- Team: All Sports Academy
- Years active: 2010–present

Mixed martial arts record
- Total: 30
- Wins: 22
- By knockout: 9
- By submission: 8
- By decision: 5
- Losses: 8
- By knockout: 2
- By decision: 6

Other information
- Website: https://www.daviddvorakmma.com
- Mixed martial arts record from Sherdog

David Dvořák (born June 5, 1992) is a Czech professional mixed martial artist. He competed in the Flyweight division in the Ultimate Fighting Championship (UFC).

== Background ==
During his professional career in combat sports, he graduated in 2015 with a bachelor's degree in Sports Management from the University of Hradec Králové. In addition to his studies, he had to combine training with his job to earn a living and prepare for fights. For three years he worked as a construction engineer in highway construction and for five years he worked as a gravedigger, following his father's example. His past as a gravedigger is reflected in his nickname "Undertaker".

In his spare time, he enjoys recreational shooting, chess, gardening, and animals. He has had a positive relationship with the latter since childhood, having grown up on a farm surrounded by farm animals. He now keeps a domestic cat of the Sphynx breed. Before combat sports, he played competitive chess, in which he competed in the junior chess league until the age of seventeen.

== Mixed martial arts career ==
=== Early career ===
He started with MMA in 2009 in Valetudo club in Hradec Králové. He had his first professional fight at the age of 18 in 2010, when he lost on points to Filip Mack. Dvořák would then compile a 17–3 record fighting across various Czech regional promotions. Now he trains in clubs TopAtlet and All Sports Academy. His main coaches are Patrik Kincl, Jan Maršálek and Lukáš Chotěnovský. Apart from domestic clubs, he has also gained experience abroad. He has attended training camps in London, Poland, and Thailand, where he spent six months training with clubs such as Team Quest, Phuket Top Team and Tiger Muay Thai.

=== XFN ===
Dvořák made his debut with the Czech-based XFN at XFN 5 on October 21, 2017, when he was booked to face Miroslav Kubáň. He won the fight by a second-round technical knockout.

Dvořák made three more appearances with XFN. Dvořák first faced Marco Manovali at XFN 8 on March 3, 2018. He won the fight by a first-round technical knockout. Dvořák next faced Salambek Damaev at XFN 13 on November 10, 2018. He won the fight by a second-round submission. Dvořák faced Zaka Fatullazade at XFN 15 on December 27, 2018, in his fourth and final appearance with the promotion. He won the fight by a first-round technical knockout.

Dvořák faced Arsen Taigibov at Oktagon 13 on July 27, 2019. He won the fight by a second-round submission.

=== Ultimate Fighting Championship ===
He signed a contract with the UFC in 2020, becoming the fourth Czech to achieve such a feat. He accepted the offer with only five weeks' notice before the UFC Fight Night: Lee vs. Oliveira event in Brazil on March 14, 2020, where he replaced fighter Su Mudaerji. In his debut bout, he faced Bruno Gustavo da Silva, whom he defeated on points after three rounds.

At the UFC Fight Night: Covington vs. Woodley event held in Las Vegas on September 19, 2020, he faced Jordan Espinosa, who was ranked 13th in the flyweight rankings before the fight. Dvořák defeated his better-ranked opponent on points by unanimous decision, extending his unbeaten streak to 15 fights.

Dvořák was scheduled to face Raulian Paiva on May 22, 2021, at the UFC Fight Night: Font vs. Garbrandt event. However, Paiva pulled out of the fight the day before the event due to ill effects related to his weight cut. He was replaced by promotional newcomer Juancamilo Ronderos. At the weigh-ins, Ronderos weighed in at 128.5 pounds, two and a half pounds over the division's non-title fight limit. The bout proceeded at catchweight and he was fined 20% of his purse, which went to Dvořák. Dvořák won the fight via a rear-naked choke submission in the first round.

Dvořák faced Matheus Nicolau on March 26, 2022, at UFC on ESPN 33. He lost the fight by unanimous decision.

Dvořák faced Manel Kape on December 17, 2022, at UFC Fight Night 216. He lost the fight via unanimous decision.

Dvořák was scheduled to face Matt Schnell on June 10, 2023, at UFC 289. However, Schnell pulled out in late May due to injury and was replaced by promotional newcomer Steve Erceg. In an upset, he lost the bout via unanimous decision.

Dvořák was scheduled to face Tatsuro Taira on October 14, 2023, at UFC Fight Night 230. However, the bout was cancelled for unknown reasons. On June 29, 2024, it was reported that Dvorak was removed from UFC roster.

=== Post-UFC career ===
Dvořák faced Mikhail Sirbu on March 22, 2025, at the "Real Fight Arena 21 x ZHS". He won the fight via unanimous decision.

=== Return to the Oktagon MMA ===
Dvořák faced Mohammed Walid on September 13, 2025, at Oktagon 75. He won the fight via knockout in round one.

== Championships and accomplishments ==
- Gladiator Championship Fighting
  - GCF Flyweight Championship (One time)

== Mixed martial arts record ==
Professional record breakdown
30 matches	22 wins	8 losses
By knockout	9	2
By submission	8	0
By decision	5	6

Res.	Record	Opponent	Method	Event	Date	Round	Time	Location	Notes
Loss	22–8	Aaron Aby	Decision (split)	Oktagon 95	October 17, 2026	3	5:00	Karlovy Vary, Czech Republic	
Loss	22–7	Zhalgas Zhumagulov	TKO (doctor stoppage)	Oktagon 81	December 28, 2025	3	5:00	Prague, Czech Republic	For the Oktagon Flyweight Championship.
Win	22–6	Mohammed Walid	KO (punches)	Oktagon 75	September 13, 2025	1	3:56	Hanover, Germany	
Win	21–6	Mikhail Sirbu	Decision (unanimous)	Real Fight Arena 21 x ZHS	March 22, 2025	3	5:00	Sosnowiec, Poland	
Loss	20–6	Steve Erceg	Decision (unanimous)	UFC 289	June 10, 2023	3	5:00	Vancouver, British Columbia, Canada	
Loss	20–5	Manel Kape	Decision (unanimous)	UFC Fight Night: Cannonier vs. Strickland	December 17, 2022	3	5:00	Las Vegas, Nevada, United States	
Loss	20–4	Matheus Nicolau	Decision (unanimous)	UFC on ESPN: Blaydes vs. Daukaus	March 26, 2022	3	5:00	Columbus, Ohio, United States	
Win	20–3	Juancamilo Ronderos	Submission (rear-naked choke)	UFC Fight Night: Font vs. Garbrandt	May 22, 2021	1	2:43	Las Vegas, Nevada, United States	Catchweight (128.5 lb) bout; Ronderos missed weight.
Win	19–3	Jordan Espinosa	Decision (unanimous)	UFC Fight Night: Covington vs. Woodley	September 19, 2020	3	5:00	Las Vegas, Nevada, United States	
Win	18–3	Bruno Gustavo da Silva	Decision (unanimous)	UFC Fight Night: Lee vs. Oliveira	March 14, 2020	3	5:00	Brasília, Brazil	
Win	17–3	Arsen Taigibov	Submission (rear-naked choke)	Oktagon 13	July 27, 2019	2	4:02	Prague, Czech Republic	
Win	16–3	Igor Goncharov	TKO (punches)	Night of Warriors 15	April 6, 2019	1	3:10	Liberec, Czech Republic	
Win	15–3	Zaka Fatullazade	TKO (punches)	XFN 15	December 27, 2018	1	2:26	Prague, Czech Republic	
Win	14–3	Salambek Damaev	Submission (rear-naked choke)	XFN 13	November 10, 2018	2	2:10	Pardubice, Czech Republic	
Win	13–3	Marco Manovali	TKO (punches and elbows)	XFN 8	March 3, 2018	1	3:56	Pardubice, Czech Republic	
Win	12–3	Miroslav Kubáň	TKO (punches)	XFN 5	October 21, 2017	2	3:58	Pardubice, Czech Republic	
Win	11–3	Shely Santana	Submission (rear-naked choke)	Night of Masters 11	December 10, 2016	1	4:30	Prague, Czech Republic	
Win	10–3	Miroslav Kubáň	TKO (doctor stoppage)	Fight Nights Global 49	June 4, 2016	2	2:41	Banská Bystrica, Slovakia	Catchweight (130 lb) bout.
Win	9–3	Tomáš Žák	TKO (punches)	GCF 31	May 22, 2015	1	1:03	Brno, Czech Republic	Won the vacant GCF Flyweight Championship.
Win	8–3	Martin Fexa	Submission (rear-naked choke)	GCF 30	February 25, 2015	1	4:19	Prague, Czech Republic	
Win	7–3	Kamil Wójcik	Submission (armbar)	GCF 29	December 12, 2014	1	4:25	Mladá Boleslav, Czech Republic	Catchweight (130 lb) bout.
Win	6–3	Petr Neumann	TKO	GCF Challenge: Eastern Best 3	October 11, 2014	1	N/A	Pardubice, Czech Republic	
Win	5–3	Ondrej Skalnik	Submission (rear-naked choke)	GCF 16	October 7, 2012	1	2:30	Pardubice, Czech Republic	
Loss	4–3	Filip Macek	TKO (cut)	GCF 12	May 11, 2012	2	0:15	Brno, Czech Republic	
Win	4–2	Artur Jevsejčik	Decision (unanimous)	GCF 9	February 18, 2012	3	5:00	Ostrava, Czech Republic	
Win	3–2	Michal Malata	Submission (heel hook)	Fighters Fight Night	December 16, 2011	2	1:13	Pardubice, Czech Republic	
Loss	2–2	Leszek Kulik	Decision (unanimous)	Heroes Gate 4	June 23, 2011	3	5:00	Prague, Czech Republic	
Win	2–1	Tomas Masojidek	TKO (punches)	GCF 3	April 23, 2011	2	2:03	Říčany, Czech Republic	
Win	1–1	Petr Neuman	Decision (unanimous)	GCF 1	December 4, 2010	3	3:00	Prague, Czech Republic	
Loss	0–1	Filip Macek	Decision (unanimous)	Nord Bohemia Ring	June 6, 2010	2	5:00	Ústí nad Labem, Czech Republic	

== Professional boxing record ==
1 fight	1 win	0 losses
By knockout	1	0

No.	Result	Record	Opponent	Type	Round, time	Date	Location	Notes
1	Win	1–0	Dmytro Tverdokhlibov	TKO	3 (4), 0:44	Nov 9, 2024	PETROF Gallery, Hradec Králové, Czech Republic	

== See also ==
- List of male mixed martial artists
