= UFC on ESPN: Blaydes vs. Daukaus =

Mixed martial arts event in 2022

- The poster for UFC on ESPN: Blaydes vs. Daukaus
- Promotion: Ultimate Fighting Championship
- Date: March 26, 2022
- Venue: Nationwide Arena
- City: Columbus, Ohio, United States
- Attendance: 18,630
- Total gate: $1,921,988.24

Event chronology
UFC Fight Night: Volkov vs. Aspinall	UFC on ESPN: Blaydes vs. Daukaus	UFC 273: Volkanovski vs. The Korean Zombie

UFC on ESPN: Blaydes vs. Daukaus (also known as UFC on ESPN 33) was a mixed martial arts event produced by the Ultimate Fighting Championship that took place on March 26, 2022, at the Nationwide Arena in Columbus, Ohio, United States.

== Background ==
A light heavyweight bout between former KSW and UFC Light Heavyweight Champion Jan Błachowicz and Aleksandar Rakić was expected to serve as the event headliner. However, in late January, Błachowicz withdrew due to an injury and the bout was rescheduled for UFC on ESPN 36. Instead, a heavyweight bout between Curtis Blaydes and Chris Daukaus headlined the event.

A women's flyweight bout between Joanne Wood and Alexa Grasso was originally scheduled for UFC Fight Night: Vieira vs. Tate, but Grasso pulled out due to injury and the pairing was scrapped. They were then rescheduled for this event.

A welterweight bout between Matt Brown and Bryan Barberena was expected to take place at UFC on ESPN: Font vs. Aldo in last December, but Brown was removed from the contest due to testing positive for COVID-19. They instead met at this event.

A bantamweight bout between Montel Jackson and Danaa Batgerel was scheduled for this event. However, Jackson had to pull out of the bout and was replaced by Chris Gutiérrez.

A women's strawweight bout between former Invicta FC Atomweight Champion Michelle Waterson and Amanda Ribas was expected to take place at this event. However, Waterson was forced to withdraw in early March due to an undisclosed injury and the bout was postponed to UFC 274. At first, they were expected to meet at UFC 257, but Waterson pulled out of that bout due to undisclosed reasons.

Lerone Murphy and Nate Landwehr were expected to meet in a featherweight bout. However, Murphy withdrew from the bout due to undisclosed reasons and was replaced by David Onama. In turn, Landwehr had to pull out of the bout and the bout was scrapped.

Undefeated middleweights Aliaskhab Khizriev and Abusupiyan Magomedov were expected to meet at the event. However, Magomedov pulled out for unknown reasons and was replaced by Denis Tiuliulin.

A featherweight bout between Tucker Lutz and Seung Woo Choi was scheduled for the event. However, Choi was forced to withdraw from the event due to an undisclosed injury and the bout was scrapped.

A heavyweight bout between Aleksei Oleinik and Ilir Latifi was expected to take place at event. However, the bout was canceled as Latifi withdrew on the day of the event due to illness. The pairing was rescheduled for two weeks later at UFC 273.

== Results ==
Main card (ESPN / ESPN+)
Weight class				Method	Round	Time	Notes
Heavyweight	Curtis Blaydes	def.	Chris Daukaus	TKO (punches)	2	0:17
Women's Flyweight	Alexa Grasso	def.	Joanne Wood	Submission (rear-naked choke)	1	3:57
Welterweight	Bryan Barberena	def.	Matt Brown	Decision (split) (29–28, 28–29, 29–28)	3	5:00
Flyweight	Kai Kara-France	def.	Askar Askarov	Decision (unanimous) (29–28, 29–28, 29–28)	3	5:00
Welterweight	Neil Magny	def.	Max Griffin	Decision (split) (29–28, 28–29, 29–28)	3	5:00
Lightweight	Marc Diakiese	def.	Viacheslav Borshchev	Decision (unanimous) (30–27, 30–27, 30–27)	3	5:00
Preliminary card (ESPN+)
Women's Bantamweight	Sara McMann	def.	Karol Rosa	Decision (unanimous) (29–28, 29–28, 29–28)	3	5:00
Bantamweight	Chris Gutiérrez	def.	Danaa Batgerel	TKO (spinning back fist and elbows)	2	2:34
Middleweight	Aliaskhab Khizriev	def.	Denis Tiuliulin	Technical Submission (rear-naked choke)	2	1:58
Women's Flyweight	Manon Fiorot	def.	Jennifer Maia	Decision (unanimous) (30–27, 30–27, 30–27)	3	5:00
Flyweight	Matheus Nicolau	def.	David Dvořák	Decision (unanimous) (29–28, 29–28, 29–28)	3	5:00
Featherweight	Luis Saldaña	def.	Bruno Souza	Decision (unanimous) (29–28, 29–28, 29–28)	3	5:00

== Bonus awards ==
The following fighters received $50,000 bonuses.

- Fight of the Night: Bryan Barberena vs. Matt Brown
- Performance of the Night: Curtis Blaydes and Chris Gutiérrez

== Records set ==
The event had the highest grossing gate for a U.S.-based fight night.

== Reported payout ==
The following is the reported payout to the fighters as reported to the Ohio Athletic Commission. The amounts do not include sponsor money, discretionary bonuses, viewership points or additional earnings. The total disclosed payout for the event was $1,717,000.

- Curtis Blaydes: $262,000 (includes $131,000 win bonus) def. Chris Daukaus: $80,000
- Alexa Grasso: $86,000 (includes $43,000 win bonus) def. Joanne Wood: $70,000
- Kai Kara-France: $102,000 (includes $51,000 win bonus) def. Askar Askarov: $26,000
- Bryan Barberena: $122,000 (includes $61,000 win bonus) def. Matt Brown: $105,000
- Manon Fiorot: $80,000 (includes $40,000 win bonus) def. Jennifer Maia: $60,000
- Neil Magny: $230,000 (includes $115,000 win bonus) def. Max Griffin: $53,000
- Marc Diakiese: $66,000 (includes $33,000 win bonus) def. Viachaslav Borshchev: $12,000
- Sara McMann: $88,000 (includes $44,000 win bonus) def. Karol Rosa: $28,000
- Chris Gutiérrez: $72,000 (includes $36,000 win bonus) def. Batgerel Danaa: $28,000
- Matheus Nicolau: $44,000 (includes $22,000 win bonus) def. David Dvořák: $35,000
- Aliaskhab Khizriev: $20,000 (includes $10,000 win bonus) def. Denis Tiuliulin: $12,000
- Luis Saldaña: $24,000 (includes $12,000 win bonus) def. Bruno Souza: $12,000

== See also ==
- List of UFC events
- List of current UFC fighters
- 2022 in UFC
