= Joaquim Silva (fighter) =

Brazilian mixed martial artist

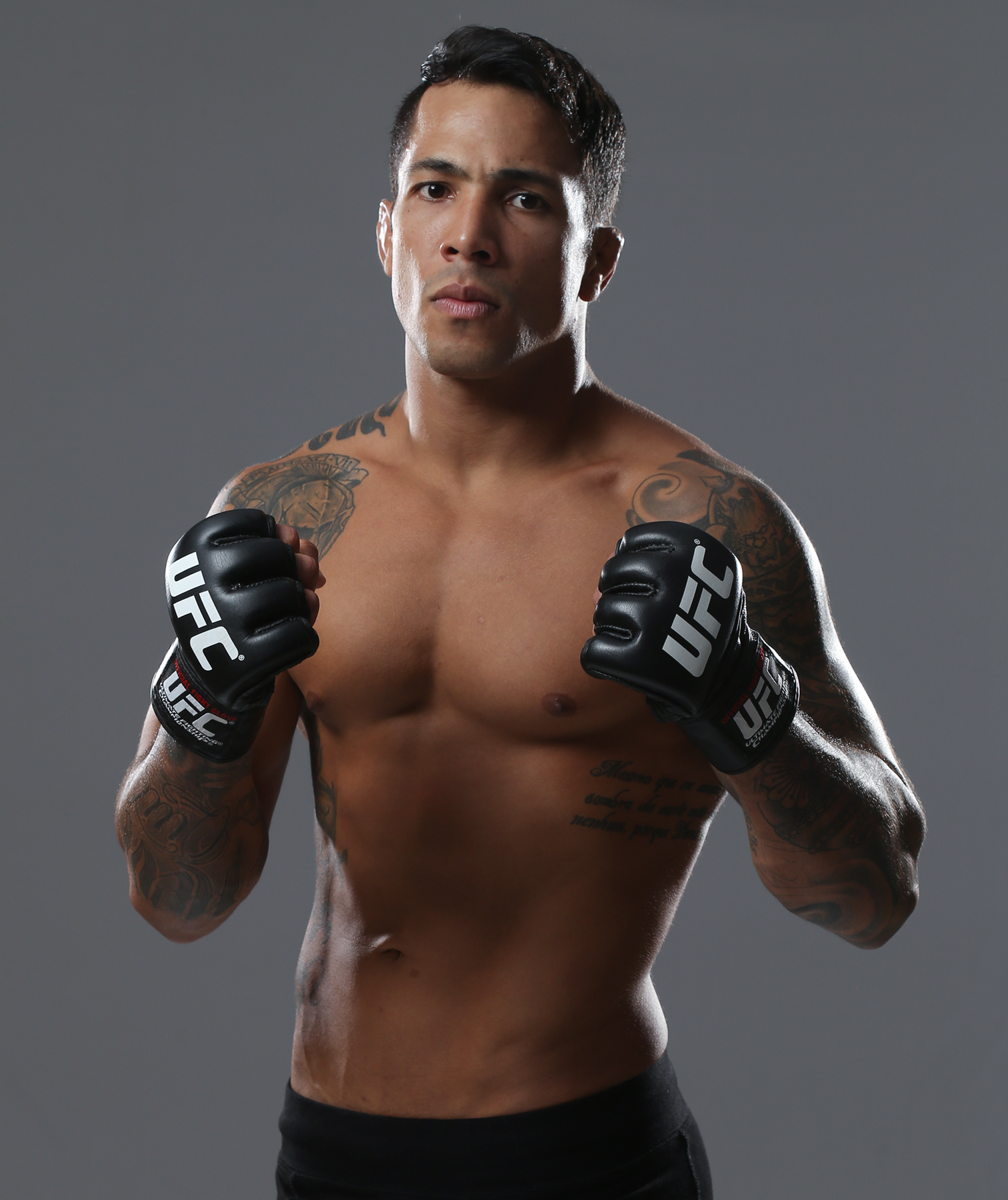
- Born: Joaquim Antônio Magalhães da Silva; February 5, 1989 (age 37); Anápolis, Goiás, Brazil
- Other names: Netto BJJ
- Height: 5 ft 8 in (1.73 m)
- Weight: 155 lb (70 kg; 11.1 st)
- Division: Lightweight
- Reach: 69 in (175 cm)
- Stance: Orthodox
- Fighting out of: Curitiba, Parana, Brazil
- Team: Evolução Thai
- Rank: Black belt in Brazilian Jiu-Jitsu; Black kruang in Muay Thai
- Years active: 2010–present

Mixed martial arts record
- Total: 19
- Wins: 14
- By knockout: 7
- By submission: 3
- By decision: 4
- Losses: 5
- By knockout: 3
- By decision: 2

Other information
- Mixed martial arts record from Sherdog

Joaquim Antônio Magalhães Silva (born February 5, 1989) is a Brazilian mixed martial artist who currently competes in the lightweight division of the Ultimate Fighting Championship.

== Background ==
Silva began training in various forms of martial arts as a youngster. He then starting training in Muay Thai, boxing and Brazilian jiu-jitsu as a teenager before transitioning to mixed martial arts in 2009.

== Mixed martial arts career ==
Silva made his professional mixed martial arts debut in October 2010. He compiled an undefeated record of 7-0, competing for various regional promotions in Brazil before trying out for The Ultimate Fighter in early 2014.

=== The Ultimate Fighter ===
In March 2015, it was announced that Silva was one of the fighters selected to be on The Ultimate Fighter: Brazil 4.

In his first fight on the show, Silva faced Carlos Costa. He won the fight via TKO in the third round.

In the quarterfinals, Silva faced off against Erick da Silva. He won the fight via unanimous decision.

In the semifinals, Silva faced Glaico França. He lost via submission in the first round.

=== Ultimate Fighting Championship ===
Silva made his official debut for the promotion on September 5, 2015, at UFC 191 where he faced fellow castmate Nazareno Malegarie. He won the fight via split decision.

Luque next faced Andrew Holbrook on July 8, 2016, at The Ultimate Fighter 23 Finale. He won the fight by knockout in the first round.

Silva was expected to face promotional newcomer Gregor Gillespie on September 24, 2016, at UFC Fight Night 95. However, Silva pulled out of the fight citing injury and was replaced by former opponent Glaico França.

Silva was expected to face Mairbek Taisumov on May 28, 2017, at UFC Fight Night 109. However, Taisumov pulled out due to injury and was replaced by Reza Madadi. Silva won the fight via split decision.

Silva faced Vinc Pichel on January 27, 2018, at UFC on Fox: Jacaré vs. Brunson 2. He lost the fight by unanimous decision.

Silva faced Jared Gordon on December 15, 2018, at UFC on Fox 31. He won the fight via technical knockout in round three. This win earned him the Fight of the Night award.

Silva faced Nasrat Haqparast on August 3, 2019, at UFC on ESPN 5. He lost the fight via knockout in the second round.

Silva faced Ricky Glenn on June 19, 2021, at UFC on ESPN 25. He lost the bout via knockout just 37 seconds into the first round.

Silva faced Jesse Ronson, replacing injured Vinc Pichel, on October 1, 2022, at UFC Fight Night 211. He won the bout in the second round, dropping Ronson with a flying knee and then finishing him with ground and pound. This win earned him the Performance of the Night award.

Silva faced Arman Tsarukyan on June 17, 2023, at UFC on ESPN 47. He lost the bout via TKO in the third round.

Silva faced Clay Guida on December 2, 2023, at UFC on ESPN 52. He won the fight via unanimous decision.

Silva faced Drakkar Klose on May 3, 2024, at UFC 301. He lost the fight by unanimous decision.

Silva was scheduled to face Rafa García on March 29, 2025 at UFC on ESPN 64. However, Silva withdrew from the fight for unknown reasons and was replaced by Vinc Pichel.

Silva faced Claudio Puelles on September 13, 2025, at UFC Fight Night 259. He won the fight by split decision.

== Championships and accomplishments ==
=== Mixed martial arts ===
- Ultimate Fighting Championship
  - Fight of the Night (One time) vs.Jared Gordon
  - Performance of the Night (One time) vs. Jesse Ronson

== Mixed martial arts record ==
Professional record breakdown
19 matches	14 wins	5 losses
By knockout	7	3
By submission	3	0
By decision	4	2

Res.	Record	Opponent	Method	Event	Date	Round	Time	Location	Notes
Win	14–5	Claudio Puelles	Decision (split)	UFC Fight Night: Lopes vs. Silva	September 13, 2025	3	5:00	San Antonio, Texas, United States	
Loss	13–5	Drakkar Klose	Decision (unanimous)	UFC 301	May 4, 2024	3	5:00	Rio de Janeiro, Brazil	
Win	13–4	Clay Guida	Decision (unanimous)	UFC on ESPN: Dariush vs. Tsarukyan	December 2, 2023	3	5:00	Austin, Texas, United States	
Loss	12–4	Arman Tsarukyan	TKO (punches)	UFC on ESPN: Vettori vs. Cannonier	June 17, 2023	3	3:25	Las Vegas, Nevada, United States	
Win	12–3	Jesse Ronson	TKO (knee and punches)	UFC Fight Night: Dern vs. Yan	October 1, 2022	2	3:08	Las Vegas, Nevada, United States	Performance of the Night.
Loss	11–3	Ricky Glenn	KO (punches)	UFC on ESPN: The Korean Zombie vs. Ige	June 19, 2021	1	0:37	Las Vegas, Nevada, United States	
Loss	11–2	Nasrat Haqparast	KO (punches)	UFC on ESPN: Covington vs. Lawler	August 3, 2019	2	0:36	Newark, New Jersey, United States	
Win	11–1	Jared Gordon	KO (punches)	UFC on Fox: Lee vs. Iaquinta 2	December 15, 2018	3	2:39	Milwaukee, Wisconsin, United States	Fight of the Night.
Loss	10–1	Vinc Pichel	Decision (unanimous)	UFC on Fox: Jacaré vs. Brunson 2	January 27, 2018	3	5:00	Charlotte, North Carolina, United States	
Win	10–0	Reza Madadi	Decision (split)	UFC Fight Night: Gustafsson vs. Teixeira	May 28, 2017	3	5:00	Stockholm, Sweden	
Win	9–0	Andrew Holbrook	KO (punches)	The Ultimate Fighter: Team Joanna vs. Team Cláudia Finale	July 8, 2016	1	0:34	Las Vegas, Nevada, United States	
Win	8–0	Nazareno Malegarie	Decision (split)	UFC 191	September 5, 2015	3	5:00	Las Vegas, Nevada, United States	Lightweight debut.
Win	7–0	Leandro Vasconcelos	TKO (punches)	The Hill Fighters 3	September 20, 2014	1	0:06	Bento Gonçalves, Brazil	
Win	6–0	Victor Rizzo	Submission (armbar)	Reto de Campeones 1	February 14, 2014	1	4:57	Mexico City, Mexico	
Win	5–0	Fabio Lima Ferreira	TKO (punches)	Shooto Brazil 44	November 14, 2013	1	4:45	Goiânia, Brazil	
Win	4–0	Juilo Cezar Alves	Submission (armbar)	High Fight Rock 3	June 15, 2013	1	3:15	Anápolis, Brazil	
Win	3–0	Adalton Fernandes	KO (punch)	Budokukai Martial Arts Tournament	September 29, 2012	1	0:30	Palmas, Brazil	
Win	2–0	Lucas Blade	Submission (rear-naked choke)	Anapolis Fight Championship	May 19, 2012	1	3:58	Anápolis, Brazil	
Win	1–0	Alan Lima	TKO (punches)	Hot Fight: Vale Tudo	October 15, 2010	1	4:10	Ipameri, Brazil	

== Mixed martial arts exhibition record ==
Professional record breakdown
3 matches	2 wins	1 loss
By knockout	1	0
By submission	0	1
By decision	1	0

Res.	Record	Opponent	Method	Event	Date	Round	Time	Location	Notes
Loss	2–1	Glaico França	Submission (rear-naked choke)	The Ultimate Fighter: Brazil 4	June 15, 2015 (airdate)	1	2:48	Las Vegas, Nevada, United States	The Ultimate Fighter: Brazil 4 Semifinals round
Win	2–0	Erick da Silva	Decision (unanimous)	The Ultimate Fighter: Brazil 4	May 26, 2015 (airdate)	3	5:00	Las Vegas, Nevada, United States	The Ultimate Fighter: Brazil 4 Quarterfinals round
Win	1–0	Carlos Costa	TKO (punches)	The Ultimate Fighter: Brazil 4	April 14, 2015 (airdate)	3	1:47	Las Vegas, Nevada, United States	The Ultimate Fighter: Brazil 4 Entry round

== See also ==
- List of current UFC fighters
- List of male mixed martial artists
