= The Ultimate Fighter: Team Joanna vs. Team Cláudia =

UFC mixed martial arts television series and event in 2016

- Genre: Reality, Sports
- Created by: Frank Fertitta III, Lorenzo Fertitta, Dana White
- Starring: Dana White, Joanna Jędrzejczyk, Cláudia Gadelha
- Country of origin: United States

Production
- Running time: 60 minutes

Original release
- Network: Fox Sports 1
- Release: April 20 – July 6, 2016

The Ultimate Fighter: Team Joanna vs. Team Cláudia (also known as The Ultimate Fighter 23) was an installment of the Ultimate Fighting Championship (UFC)-produced reality television series The Ultimate Fighter.

On January 17, 2016, during the live broadcast of UFC Fight Night 81, it was announced that the coaches for the season would be Joanna Jędrzejczyk and Cláudia Gadelha. The coaches faced each other in a UFC Women's Strawweight Championship bout at the conclusion of the season.

The UFC held open tryouts for the show on December 14, 2015. The casting call was for light heavyweight, women's bantamweight and women's strawweight fighters who were at least 21 years old and had a minimum of two wins in three professional fights. Subsequently, it was announced that eight light heavyweight and eight women's strawweight competitors would compete on the show. The cast was revealed on April 6, 2016.

== Cast ==
=== Teams ===
Team Joanna

- Joanna Jędrzejczyk, Head Coach
- Robert Drysdale, Jiu Jitsu Coach
- Daniel Woirin, Muay Thai Coach
- Paweł Derlacz
- Szymon Bońkowski

Team Cláudia:
- Cláudia Gadelha, Head Coach
- Jair Lourenço, Assistant Coach
- Nenzão, Boxing Coach
- Ronaldo Candido, Jiu Jitsu Coach
- Rafael Vinícius, Kickboxing Coach

=== Fighters ===
- Team Joanna
  - Light heavyweights: Josh Stansbury, Khalil Rountree, Myron Dennis, and Elias Urbina IV.
  - Women's Strawweights: JJ Aldrich, Jamie Moyle, Ashley Yoder, and Helen Harper.
- Team Cláudia
  - Light heavyweights: Andrew Sanchez, Eric Spicely, Abdel Medjedoub, and Cory Hendricks.
  - Women's Strawweights: Tatiana Suarez, Kate Jackson, Amanda Cooper, and Lanchana Green.
- Fighters eliminated before entry round
  - Light heavyweights: Kenneth Bergh, Muhammed Dereese, Jamelle Jones, Norman Paraisy, John Paul Elias, Phil Hawes, Marcel Fortuna, and Trevor Carlson.
  - Women's Strawweights: Mellony Geugjes, Ashley Cummins, Alyssa Krahn, Jodie Esquibel, Kristi Lopez, Chel-c Bailey, Irene Cabello Rivera, and Amy Montenegro.

== Episodes ==
Episode 1: Ladies and Gents (April 20, 2016)

- Dana White welcomed the 32 fighters, consisting of light heavyweights and women's strawweights, to the show. He introduced them to the coaches, Joanna Jędrzejczyk and Cláudia Gadelha.
- The preliminary fights began:

Women's Strawweight – Amanda Cooper defeated Mellony Geugjes via submission (armbar) in the first round.
Light heavyweight – Eric Spicely defeated Kenneth Bergh via submission (rear-naked choke) in the first round.
Women's Strawweight – Lanchana Green defeated Ashley Cummins via TKO (knees and punches) in the second round.
Light heavyweight – Khalil Rountree defeated Muhammed Dereese via TKO (punches and soccer kicks to the body) in the second round.
Women's Strawweight – Jamie Moyle defeated Alyssa Krahn via submission (rear-naked choke) in the first round.
Light heavyweight – Myron Dennis defeated Jamelle Jones via TKO (punches) in the first round.
Women's Strawweight- Ashley Yoder defeated Jodie Esquibel via split decision after two rounds.
Light heavyweight – Elias Urbina IV defeated Norman Paraisy via unanimous decision after three rounds.
Women's Strawweight – JJ Aldrich defeated Kristi Lopez via unanimous decision after two rounds.
Light heavyweight – Abdel Medjedoub defeated John Paul Elias via unanimous decision after two rounds.
Women's Strawweight – Tatiana Suarez defeated Chel-c Bailey via unanimous decision after two rounds.
Light heavyweight – Andrew Sanchez defeated Phil Hawes via unanimous decision after two rounds.
Women's Strawweight – Kate Jackson defeated Irene Cabello Rivera via TKO (punches) in the second round.
Light heavyweight – Cory Hendricks defeated Marcel Fortuna via unanimous decision after three rounds.
Women's Strawweight – Helen Harper defeated Amy Montenegro via submission (armbar) in the first round.
Light heavyweight – Josh Stansbury defeated Trevor Carlson via submission (americana) in the first round.

- White reminds the fighters that the winning fighter and coach will get a Harley Davidson motorcycle.
- White kicked off the tournament by flipping a coin (red for Joanna, blue for Cláudia) to determine which team will pick the first fight. Team Cláudia wins the coin toss and opts to choose the first fighter.
- Women's Strawweights selection:

Coach	1st Pick	2nd Pick	3rd Pick	4th Pick
Cláudia	Tatiana Suarez	Kate Jackson	Amanda Cooper	Lanchana Green
Joanna	JJ Aldrich	Jamie Moyle	Ashley Yoder	Helen Harper

- Light Heavyweights selection:

Coach	1st Pick	2nd Pick	3rd Pick	4th Pick
Cláudia	Andrew Sanchez	Eric Spicely	Abdel Medjedoub	Cory Hendricks
Joanna	Josh Stansbury	Khalil Rountree	Myron Dennis	Elias Urbina IV

- Jędrzejczyk announces the first fight and matches training partners Rountree against Hendricks.

Episode 2: Friends and Foes (April 27, 2016)

- The fighters make their way into the TUF house and choose their bedrooms. However, there's a problem when Abdel Medjedoub arrives late and finds out there's only one bed left, which is in one of the female fighters' rooms. Being a Muslim and married, he cannot be put in that situation, so he asks Cory Hendricks, who is single, to room with the women. He takes "one for the team" and moves into their room.
- Hurt from his last fight to get into the house, Hendricks gets his swollen feet checked out by orthopedic surgeon and even though the bones in his feet are not broken, he suffers from a severe contusions to the soft tissue and must rest up before his next fight with his training partner Khalil Rountree.
- Things heat up between the coaches Joanna and Cláudia, and a lot of trash talk commences.
- Helen Harper gets sick and can't train with her team. She is found by Rountree, huddled on the floor in kitchen cupboard with her hands shaking, and is taken to the doctor.
- Cory Hendricks defeated Khalil Rountree via submission (rear-naked choke) in the first round.
- Gadelha announces the first women's fight: Tatiana Suarez vs. JJ Aldrich.

Episode 3: Who I Am (May 4, 2016)

- After recovering from being sick, Helen Harper injures her shoulder during grappling training and quickly gets upset, losing mental focus. Once again, Khalil Rountree is there for positive reinforcement.
- At the TUF house, Rountree challenges Cory Hendricks to a "UFC Doughnut Eating Championship"; who could eat a dozen donuts the fastest in 5 minutes. Rountree is the winner and earns the golden donut while Hendricks has to have one of the women apply makeup and wear a sports bra. Amanda Cooper gives him a full makeover.
- As a reward for their hard work, the fighters receive a letter from an impressed Dana White inviting them to play a sneak peek of the new Doom video game.
- Before the fight, UFC welterweight champion Robbie Lawler and UFC Hall of Famer Matt Hughes visit Suarez with words of encouragement.
- Tatiana Suarez defeated JJ Aldrich via submission (rear-naked choke) 3 minutes and 14 seconds into the second round.
- Gadelha announces the next men's fight: Andrew Sanchez vs. Myron Dennis.

Episode 4: Wake Up, Guys! (May 11, 2016)

- After her team goes 0–2 losing the last two fights, Jędrzejczyk, being the extremely competitive person she is, lashes out at her fighters saying they "train like pussies," because she thinks they're slacking off in practice.
- Team Joanna responds with mixed feelings. When they get back to the TUF house, Myron Dennis huddles his teammates together and starts a rally cry, chanting what he's going to do to his opponent, Andrew Sanchez.
- Cláudia visits the house with her coaches to cook Brazilian barbecue for the fighters.
- As a joke, Kahlil Rountree wears a referee shirt and blows a whistle to kick the blue team out of the gym when it was Team Joanna's time to train. But Gadelha and her assistant coaches take their time leaving. Feeling disrespected, Jędrzejczyk gets angry and throws their kicking pads at them.
- As a way to blow off steam, both teams have a water balloon fight at the house.
- Andrew Sanchez defeated Myron Dennis via unanimous decision after two rounds.
- Gadelha announces the next women's fight: Lanchana Green vs. Helen Harper.

Episode 5: Battle of the Brits (May 18, 2016)

- Jędrzejczyk brings in former Invicta and UFC strawweight champion, and The Ultimate Fighter 20 winner, Carla Esparza, to help coach her team with wrestling and grappling.
- Since the fighters cannot have contact with the outside world, TUF producer Lewis Massoll gets an emergency phone call from Abdel Medjedoub's wife Caroline and allows him to talk to her. Apparently, Medjedoub did something that she was not happy with before the show. She says that she is going to leave him if he does not come back home to Montreal.
- Lanchana Green defeated Helen Harper via unanimous decision after three rounds.
- After the fight, Team Cláudia goes crazy celebrating the victory and Gadelha shakes hands with Team Joanna's corner. But adding more to the drama, she walks right past Jędrzejczyk herself, which the champion takes this as a huge sign of disrespect to her.
- Gadelha announces the next men's fight: Eric Spicely vs. Elias Urbina.

Episode 6: The Situation (May 25, 2016)

- White calls Abdel Medjedoub into his office to discuss his situation about his wife's ultimatum to quit the show or she's going to leave him. White lets him talk to her on the phone but she wants him to answer for his mistake in person.
- Not wanting Medjedoub chose between his career or his marriage, White gives him a few days to straighten this emergency out and he will fly him back to the show.
- Elias Urbina shows a few teammates the poster of his TUF alumni older brother, Hector Urbina, who was a cast member of TUF season 19.
- Khalil Rountree's knees have been sore and the doctor says he has minor tendinitis. During training, he has been getting sharp pain while in different grappling positions and his positive attitude suddenly goes to frustration. So he takes a few days off to rest.
- At the TUF house, Rountree and Urbina decide to prank the female fighters by putting baby powder in their hairdryers. In retaliation, the women throw baby powder on some of the men, while they are in the hot tub. Also, Myron Dennis gets a scare from Rountree who jumps out of the tub in the bathroom.
- As promised, Medjedoub handles his business, flying back in a few days and continues to compete on the show.
- Eric Spicely defeated Elias Urbina via unanimous decision after two rounds.
- Gadelha announces the next women's fight: Amanda Cooper vs. Jamie Moyle.

Episode 7: No Easy Fight (June 1, 2016)

- Since Team Cláudia could potentially go down as the first team to pull a sweep, Jędrzejczyk is feeling the pressure and will do anything to get her fighters motivated, including saying the upcoming women's match-up with Amanda Cooper will be an "easy fight" for Jamie Moyle. Team Cláudia just brushes the comment off.
- Jędrzejczyk also brings in former UFC bantamweight champion T.J. Dillashaw to guest coach.
- At the TUF house, Khalil Rountree breaks down because he nearly forget his late father's birthday, which he still celebrates in his honor, since he died when Rountree was only 2-year's-old.
- White surprises the fighters for their hardcore performances this season with a night out on the Las Vegas Strip. He rents them a party bus and things get crazy when Ashley Yoder gets on the stripper pole. They then see the show Absinthe and things heat up when Josh Stansbury and Myron Dennis are called up on stage to do a strip tease on Jamie Moyle.
- Amanda Cooper defeated Jamie Moyle via majority decision after two rounds.
- After the fight, believing it should have gone to a third round, Jędrzejczyk tells off the judges. Team Joanna is down 0–6.
- Gadelha announces the next men's fight: Abdel Medjedoub vs. Josh Stansbury.

Episode 8: It's a Mental Thing (June 8, 2016)

- Team Cláudia remains unbeaten, winning six straight fights and are very close to making TUF history by becoming the first team ever to sweep the preliminaries.
- During grappling practice, Cory Hendricks injures his shoulder, causing him to have severe neck and arm pain. So he decides to take it easy before he goes back to hard training again. Instead of going to the doctor, due to fearing that he will be told not to fight, Hendricks sees an acupuncturist, who along with basic needle acupuncture, she performed a therapy called "cupping" and a Chinese technique called "gua sha".
- Later, Hendricks has to go to the doctor anyway since his pain continues. The doctor orders an MRI and has to wait for a diagnoses.
- Josh Stansbury defeated Abdel Medjedoub via majority decision after two rounds.
- The red team finally gets their first win of the season, stopping Team Cláudia's 6–0 win streak.
- Jędrzejczyk announces the next women's fight: Ashley Yoder vs. Kate Jackson.

Episode 9: Beast Inside of You (June 15, 2016)

- The doctor visits Hendricks with the results from the MRI. It showed nothing serious, it's just a pain issue, so he can continue in the competition.
- Since their strawweight title match is coming up soon, Jędrzejczyk and Gadelha have to not only coach, but they have to train as well, and do so at their respected gyms.
- Kate Jackson defeated Ashley Yoder via unanimous decision after two rounds.
- One man and no women from Team Joanna will move on to the semi-finals.
- Team Cláudia finished 7–1, but ends up in an unfortunate situation that most of them will be fighting against each other. Gadelha states that this hurts her because her team are like a family.
- White announces the semi-final fights:
  - Andrew Sanchez vs. Eric Spicely.
  - Amanda Cooper vs. Lanchana Green.
  - Tatiana Suarez vs. Kate Jackson.
  - Josh Stansbury vs. Cory Hendricks.

Episode 10: Friends Hurting Friends (June 22, 2016)

- Team Cláudia still has seven fighters in the competition and has claimed every semifinal in the strawweight division and every light heavyweight, except for one.
- With a nerve injury in his neck, Cory Hendricks initially decides to push through the pain and continue to train, however, after being in intense constant pain, he takes Cláudia's advice and drops out of the competition to fight in the future.
- Dana rewards the fighters and arranges to take them out for a night on the town. They feast at Brooklyn Bowl Buffet, and the High Roller at The Linq but Cláudia gets annoyed the Joanna keeps taking the credit for all of Dana's surprises.
- Khalil Rountree replaces Cory Hendricks in the competition, but it's bittersweet because he has to fight Josh Stansbury, his teammate, and he gets upset.
- Dana gives Cory another chance after he heals by letting him fight in the TUF finale.
- This is the first time that Team Cláudia has to fight each other and they get emotional, especially for Eric Spicely, who breaks down, not wanting to fight Andrew Sanchez, his friend and training partner.
- It's that time of the season for the Coach's Challenge. This year, it's the biggest and craziest one they've ever done. There are two massive dunk tanks high off the ground. Both coaches stand at the top and shoot an air rifle that fires tennis balls at a target. If one of them hits the bullseye of 20 points, the other gets dunked into the ice cold water. The first coach to 100 points wins $10,000 cash, with each fighter getting $1,500 each.
- Cláudia wins by dunking Joanna 3 times to her 2 and is first to rack up 100 points. So Dana issues one more challenge; see if she can dunk him for another $5,000 and her team getting $500 each. Dana is afraid of heights, but he isn't up there for long since Cláudia hits the bullseye on the first try.
- Andrew Sanchez defeated Eric Spicely via knockout (punches) in the first round.
- After the fight, Andrew is distraught and concerned about knocking out Eric and crushing his dream.

Episode 11: Bump in the Road (June 29, 2016)

- Cláudia invites UFC bantamweight champion Miesha Tate to guest coach, helping her team with wrestling techniques.
- At the TUF house, the fighters decide to have some fun and put on their own bowling tournament with water bottles as pins. Lanchana Green wins the homemade paper medal.
- During the weigh-in, Amanda Cooper fails to make weight and weights in at 117 1/2 lb. She has only one hour to lose 1 1/2 pounds. The entire team helps her with the cut and she makes weight.
- Amanda Cooper defeated Lanchana Green via submission (rear-naked choke) in the first round.

Episode 12: Fight of the Season (July 6, 2016)

- Tatiana Suarez defeated Kate Jackson via submission (Guillotine choke) in the first round.
- Khalil Rountree defeated Josh Stansbury via TKO (Technical Knockout) in the first round.

== Tournament Bracket ==
=== Light heavyweight Bracket ===
Elimination Round
Myron Dennis	2
Andrew Sanchez	UD
Elias Urbina IV	2
Eric Spicely	UD
Josh Stansbury	MD
Abdel Medjedoub	2
Khalil Rountree	1
Cory Hendricks	SUB

Semi-finals
Andrew Sanchez	KO
Eric Spicely	1
Josh Stansbury	1
Khalil Rountree *	TKO

Finale
Andrew Sanchez	UD
Khalil Rountree	3

- Hendricks was replaced by Rountree after he pulled out of the competition due to a neck injury.

=== Strawweight Bracket ===
Elimination Round
Jamie Moyle	2
Amanda Cooper	MD
Helen Harper	3
Lanchana Green	UD
JJ Aldrich	2
Tatiana Suarez	SUB
Ashley Yoder	2
Kate Jackson	UD

Semi-finals
Amanda Cooper	SUB
Lanchana Green	1
Tatiana Suarez	SUB
Kate Jackson	1

Finale
Amanda Cooper	1
Tatiana Suarez	SUB

Legend
	Team Joanna
	Team Cláudia
UD	Unanimous Decision
MD	Majority Decision
SUB	Submission
(T)KO	(Technical) Knock Out

== The Ultimate Fighter 23 Finale ==
The Ultimate Fighter: Team Joanna vs. Team Cláudia Finale
- The poster for The Ultimate Fighter: Team Joanna vs. Team Cláudia Finale
- Promotion: Ultimate Fighting Championship
- Date: July 8, 2016
- Venue: MGM Grand Garden Arena
- City: Las Vegas, Nevada
- Attendance: 8,115
- Total gate: $736,408

Event chronology
UFC Fight Night: dos Anjos vs. Alvarez	The Ultimate Fighter: Team Joanna vs. Team Cláudia Finale	UFC 200: Tate vs. Nunes

The Ultimate Fighter: Team Joanna vs. Team Cláudia Finale (also known as The Ultimate Fighter 23 Finale) was a mixed martial arts event held on July 8, 2016 at the MGM Grand Garden Arena in Las Vegas, Nevada. This event was a part of UFC International Fight Week.

=== Background ===
The event was headlined by a UFC Women's Strawweight Championship bout between current champion Joanna Jędrzejczyk and top contender Cláudia Gadelha. The pair previously met at UFC on Fox: dos Santos vs. Miocic in December 2014, with Jędrzejczyk winning via split decision.

Scott Askham was expected to face Anthony Smith at the event, but pulled out on April 28 due to injury and was replaced by The Ultimate Fighter: Brazil winner Cezar Ferreira.

Stevie Ray was expected to face Jake Matthews at the event, but pulled out on June 2 citing alleged visa issues and was replaced by Kevin Lee.

James Krause was scheduled to face The Ultimate Fighter: United States vs. United Kingdom lightweight winner Ross Pearson at the event. However, on June 13, he was pulled from the fight for undisclosed reasons. He was replaced by former Bellator Lightweight Champion and promotional newcomer Will Brooks.

=== Results ===
Main Card (Fox Sports 1)
Weight class				Method	Round	Time	Notes
Women's Strawweight	Joanna Jędrzejczyk (c)	def.	Cláudia Gadelha	Decision (unanimous) (48–46, 48–45, 48–46)	5	5:00	(Note: For the UFC Women's Strawweight Championship.)
Light Heavyweight	Andrew Sanchez	def.	Khalil Rountree Jr.	Decision (unanimous) (30–25, 30–25, 30–26)	3	5:00	(Note: The Ultimate Fighter 23 Light Heavyweight tournament final.)
Women's Strawweight	Tatiana Suarez	def.	Amanda Cooper	Submission (D'Arce choke)	1	3:43	(Note: The Ultimate Fighter 23 Women's Strawweight tournament final.)
Lightweight	Will Brooks	def.	Ross Pearson	Decision (unanimous) (29–28, 29–28, 29–28)	3	5:00
Featherweight	Choi Doo-ho	def.	Thiago Tavares	TKO (punches)	1	2:42
Lightweight	Joaquim Silva	def.	Andrew Holbrook	TKO (punches)	1	0:34
Preliminary Card (Fox Sports 1)
Featherweight	Gray Maynard	def.	Fernando Bruno	Decision (unanimous) (30–27, 30–27, 30–27)	3	5:00
Flyweight	Matheus Nicolau	def.	John Moraga	Decision (split) (29–28, 28–29, 29–28)	3	5:00
Light Heavyweight	Josh Stansbury	def.	Cory Hendricks	Decision (majority) (29–27, 29–27, 28–28)	3	5:00
Middleweight	Cezar Ferreira	def.	Anthony Smith	Decision (unanimous) (29–28, 29–28, 29–28)	3	5:00
Preliminary Card (UFC Fight Pass)
Lightweight	Kevin Lee	def.	Jake Matthews	TKO (punches)	1	4:06
Welterweight	Li Jingliang	def.	Anton Zafir	KO (punches)	1	2:46

=== Scorecard for Jędrzejczyk and Gadelha ===
Judge	Fighter	1	2	3	4	5	Total
Dave Hagen	Jędrzejczyk	9	9	10	10	10	48
Dave Hagen	Gadelha	10	10	9	8	8	45
Jeff Mullen	Jędrzejczyk	9	9	10	10	10	48
Jeff Mullen	Gadelha	10	10	9	8	9	46
Marcos Rosales	Jędrzejczyk	9	9	10	10	10	48
Marcos Rosales	Gadelha	10	10	9	8	9	46

=== Bonus awards ===
The following fighters were awarded $50,000 bonuses:

- Fight of the Night: Joanna Jędrzejczyk vs. Cláudia Gadelha
- Performance of the Night: Tatiana Suarez and Doo Ho Choi

== Reported payout ==
The following is the reported payout to the fighters as reported to the Nevada State Athletic Commission. It does not include sponsor money and also does not include the UFC's traditional "fight night" bonuses.

- Joanna Jędrzejczyk: $210,000 (includes $105,000 win bonus) def. Cláudia Gadelha: $100,000
- Andrew Sanchez: $30,000 (includes $15,000 win bonus) def. Khalil Rountree: $15,000
- Tatiana Suarez: $30,000 (includes $15,000 win bonus) def. Amanda Cooper: $15,000
- Will Brooks: $100,000 (includes $50,000 win bonus) def. Ross Pearson: $54,000
- Doo Ho Choi: $24,000 (includes $12,000 win bonus) def. Thiago Tavares: $37,000
- Joaquim Silva: $24,000 (includes $12,000 win bonus) def. Andrew Holbrook: $12,000
- Gray Maynard: $96,000 (includes $48,000 win bonus) def. Fernando Bruno: $12,000
- Matheus Nicolau: $24,000 (includes $17,000 win bonus) def. John Moraga: $24,000
- Josh Stansbury: $20,000 (includes $10,000 win bonus) def. Cory Hendricks: $10,000
- Cezar Ferreira: $54,000 (includes $27,000 win bonus) def. Anthony Smith: $15,000
- Kevin Lee: $54,000 (includes $27,000 win bonus) def. Jake Matthews: $22,000
- Li Jingliang: $24,000 (includes $12,000 win bonus) def. Anton Zafir: $10,000

== See also ==
- The Ultimate Fighter
- List of current UFC fighters
- List of UFC events
- 2016 in UFC
