= UFC Fight Night: Lee vs. Oliveira =

UFC mixed marial arts event in 2020

- The poster for UFC Fight Night: Lee vs. Oliveira
- Promotion: Ultimate Fighting Championship
- Date: March 14, 2020
- Venue: Ginásio Nilson Nelson
- City: Brasília, Brazil
- Attendance: None (behind closed doors)

Event chronology
UFC 248: Adesanya vs. Romero	UFC Fight Night: Lee vs. Oliveira	UFC Fight Night: Woodley vs. Edwards

UFC Fight Night: Lee vs. Oliveira (also known as UFC Fight Night 170 and UFC on ESPN+ 28) was a mixed martial arts event produced by the Ultimate Fighting Championship that took place on March 14, 2020 at Ginásio Nilson Nelson in Brasília, Brazil.

== Background ==
A lightweight bout between former interim UFC Lightweight Championship challenger Kevin Lee and Charles Oliveira served as the event headliner.

A middleweight bout between Brad Tavares and The Ultimate Fighter: Brazil 3 heavyweight winner Antônio Carlos Júnior was scheduled for the event. However, Tavares was forced to pull out of the fight due to an anterior cruciate ligament (ACL) injury. He was replaced by Makhmud Muradov. In turn, Júnior suffered an unspecified injury and the bout was cancelled from the event.

A women's strawweight bout between Paige VanZant and Amanda Ribas was scheduled for the event. However, VanZant was forced to pull out of the fight due to an undisclosed injury. VanZant requested to reschedule the bout one month later, but Ribas decided to remain at the event and Randa Markos stepped in as the replacement.

A flyweight bout between Su Mudaerji and Bruno Gustavo da Silva was scheduled for the event. However, due to the COVID-19 pandemic in mainland China, Mudaerji was forced to withdraw from the event as he would not travel to prepare for the fight and was replaced by promotional newcomer David Dvořák.

At the weigh-ins, Lee weighed in at 158.5 lb, 2.5 lb over the lightweight non-title fight limit of 156 pounds. He was fined 20% of his purse and his bout with Oliveira proceeded as scheduled at a catchweight.

=== COVID-19 pandemic ===
On March 12, the UFC announced that this event would take place behind closed doors (for the first time in the promotion's history) after Ibaneis Rocha, the governor of the Federal District (where Brasília is located), announced that large gatherings will be suspended or closed for a period of 5 days due to the COVID-19 pandemic. Both the UFC's planned Thursday media day and Friday ceremonial weigh-ins were cancelled ahead of the card, with the official early morning weigh-ins being the only official fighter obligations that remained ahead of fight night. In response, UFC president Dana White stated "We [The UFC] always go overboard with health and safety, and that’s what we’re going to do here", although none of the fighters were tested for the COVID-19 virus by the commission leading up to the event.

== Results ==
Main card (ESPN / ESPN+)
Weight class				Method	Round	Time	Notes
Catchweight (158.5 lb)	Charles Oliveira	def.	Kevin Lee	Submission (guillotine choke)	3	0:28
Welterweight	Gilbert Burns	def.	Demian Maia	TKO (punches)	1	2:34
Lightweight	Renato Moicano	def.	Damir Hadžović	Submission (rear-naked choke)	1	0:44
Light Heavyweight	Nikita Krylov	def.	Johnny Walker	Decision (unanimous) (30–27, 29–28, 29–28)	3	5:00
Lightweight	Francisco Trinaldo	def.	John Makdessi	Decision (unanimous) (30–27, 30–27, 29–28)	3	5:00
Preliminary card (ESPN / ESPN+)
Flyweight	Brandon Moreno	def.	Jussier Formiga	Decision (unanimous) (30–27, 29–28, 29–28)	3	5:00
Women's Strawweight	Amanda Ribas	def.	Randa Markos	Decision (unanimous) (30–26, 30–25, 30–25)	3	5:00
Welterweight	Elizeu Zaleski dos Santos	def.	Alexey Kunchenko	Decision (unanimous) (29–28, 29–28, 29–28)	3	5:00
Bantamweight	Enrique Barzola	vs.	Rani Yahya	Draw (majority) (29–28, 28–28, 28–28)	3	5:00
Women's Flyweight	Maryna Moroz	def.	Mayra Bueno Silva	Decision (unanimous) (29–28, 29–28, 29–28)	3	5:00
Flyweight	David Dvořák	def.	Bruno Gustavo da Silva	Decision (unanimous) (29–28, 29–28, 29–28)	3	5:00
Women's Bantamweight	Bea Malecki	def.	Veronica Macedo	Decision (unanimous) (29–28, 29–28, 29–28)	3	5:00

== Bonus awards ==
The following fighters received $50,000 bonuses.

- Fight of the Night: Maryna Moroz vs. Mayra Bueno Silva
- Performance of the Night: Charles Oliveira and Gilbert Burns

== See also ==
- List of UFC events
- List of current UFC fighters
- 2020 in UFC
