= Nasrat Haqparast =

Afghan mixed martial artist

- Born: Mohammad Nasrat Haqparast; August 22, 1995 (age 31); Hamburg, Germany
- Nationality: Afghan
- Height: 5 ft 10 in (1.78 m)
- Weight: 155 lb (70 kg; 11 st 1 lb)
- Division: Lightweight
- Reach: 72 in (183 cm)
- Stance: Southpaw
- Fighting out of: Rabat, Morocco
- Team: Tristar Gym
- Trainer: Firas Zahabi
- Years active: 2012–present

Mixed martial arts record
- Total: 25
- Wins: 18
- By knockout: 10
- By decision: 8
- Losses: 7
- By knockout: 2
- By submission: 2
- By decision: 3

Other information
- University: Hamburg University of Applied Sciences
- Mixed martial arts record from Sherdog

Mohammad Nasrat Haqparast (born August 22, 1995) is an Afghan mixed martial artist who currently competes in the Lightweight division of the Ultimate Fighting Championship (UFC).

== Background ==
Haqparast was born in Germany to Afghan parents from Kandahar who came as refugees from Afghanistan. He attended kickboxing classes as his parents believed he was overweight at fourteen years old. Subsequently, Haqparast joined an MMA class and decided to be an MMA fighter after witnessing a sparring session in the room next to the kickboxing class.

== Mixed martial arts career ==
=== Early career ===
Haqparast started his professional MMA career in 2012 and amassed a record of 8–1 before being signed by the UFC.

=== Ultimate Fighting Championship ===
Haqparast made his UFC debut on October 21, 2017, against Marcin Held, replacing injured Teemu Packalén at UFC Fight Night 118. He lost the fight via unanimous decision.

Haqparast was scheduled to face Alex Reyes on March 17, 2018, at UFC Fight Night 127. However, on March 8, it was reported that Alex Reyes pulled out of the fight due to injury and he was replaced by Nad Narimani. The bout was scrapped on the day of the event as Haqparast was deemed unfit to fight by the medical team due to an infectious eye condition.

His next fight came on July 22, 2018, at UFC Fight Night 134 against Marc Diakiese. He won the fight via unanimous decision.

Haqparast faced Thibault Gouti on October 27, 2018, at UFC Fight Night 138. He won the fight via unanimous decision. This fight earned him the Fight of the Night award.

Haqparast was expected to face John Makdessi on March 23, 2019, at UFC Fight Night 148. However, on March 13, 2019, it was reported that Haqparast was pulled from the bout due to injury.

Haqparast faced on August 3, 2019 Joaquim Silva on UFC on ESPN 5. He won the fight via knockout in the second round. The win earned him the Performance of the Night bonus award.

Haqparast faced Drew Dober on January 18, 2020, at UFC 246. He lost the fight via knockout in the first round.

Haqparast faced Alexander Muñoz on August 8, 2020, at UFC Fight Night 174. He won the fight via unanimous decision.

Haqparast was scheduled to face Arman Tsarukyan on January 24, 2021 at UFC 257. However, on the day of the weigh-ins, Haqparast pulled out of the fight, citing illness.

Haqparast was scheduled to face Don Madge, replacing injured Guram Kutateladze, on March 13, 2021, at UFC Fight Night 187. However, Madge withdrew from the bout due to visa issues and was replaced by UFC newcomer Rafa García. Haqparast won the fight via unanimous decision.

Haqparast faced Dan Hooker on September 25, 2021, at UFC 266. He lost the fight via unanimous decision.

Haqparast faced Bobby Green on February 12, 2022, at UFC 271. He lost the bout via unanimous decision.

Haqparast faced John Makdessi on September 3, 2022, at UFC Fight Night 209. He won the fight via unanimous decision.

Haqparast was scheduled to face Jamie Mullarkey February 12, 2023, at UFC 284. However, Haqparast withdrew due to undisclosed reason and was replaced by promotional newcomer Francisco Prado.

Haqparast was scheduled to face Sam Patterson on September 2, 2023, at UFC Fight Night 226. However, Patterson pulled out due to health issues, and he was replaced by Landon Quinones, with the pair meeting the following week at UFC 293. Haqparast won the fight by unanimous decision.

Haqparast faced Jamie Mullarkey on December 9, 2023 at UFC Fight Night 233. He won the fight via knockout in round one. This fight earned him the Performance of the Night award.

Haqparast faced Jared Gordon on June 22, 2024, at UFC on ABC 6. He won the fight by a close split decision. 14 out of 16 media outlets scored the bout for Gordon.

In his next fight, he faced Esteban Ribovics on March 1, 2025 at UFC Fight Night 253. He won the fight by split decision. 9 out of 11 media outlets scored the bout for Ribovics. This fight earned him another Fight of the Night award.

Haqparast faced Quillan Salkilld on October 25, 2025 at UFC 321. He lost the fight by knockout via a head kick in the first round.

Haqparast faced Chris Padilla on August 22, 2026 at UFC Fight Night 285. He lost the fight by technical submission via arm-triangle choke in last second of round three.

== Championships and accomplishments ==
- Ultimate Fighting Championship
  - Fight of the Night (Two times) vs. Thibault Gouti and Esteban Ribovics
  - Performance of the Night (Two times) vs. Joaquim Silva and Jamie Mullarkey

== Personal life ==
Haqparast was a mechanical engineering student at Hamburg University of Applied Sciences.

When Haqparast made his UFC debut, he was dubbed by several media members as a “mini” version of middleweight fighter Kelvin Gastelum due to their close physical resemblance. This has resulted in many media outlets comparing their fighting styles often.

Haqparast's mother died in September 2021, which was weeks prior to his fight at UFC 266.

Haqparast previously fought under the Afghan flag in the UFC, but revealed on his social networks that he was no longer allowed to do so. At UFC Fight Night 209, Haqparast announced that he will represent Morocco from September 3, 2022, onwards, due to training and living there.

== Mixed martial arts record ==
Professional record breakdown
25 matches	18 wins	7 losses
By knockout	10	2
By submission	0	2
By decision	8	3

Res.	Record	Opponent	Method	Event	Date	Round	Time	Location	Notes
Loss	18–7	Chris Padilla	Technical Submission (arm-triangle choke)	UFC Fight Night: Hernandez vs. Rodrigues	August 22, 2026	3	4:59	Sacramento, California, United States	
Loss	18–6	Quillan Salkilld	KO (head kick)	UFC 321	October 25, 2025	1	2:30	Abu Dhabi, United Arab Emirates	
Win	18–5	Esteban Ribovics	Decision (split)	UFC Fight Night: Kape vs. Almabayev	March 1, 2025	3	5:00	Las Vegas, Nevada, United States	Fight of the Night.
Win	17–5	Jared Gordon	Decision (split)	UFC on ABC: Whittaker vs. Aliskerov	June 22, 2024	3	5:00	Riyadh, Saudi Arabia	
Win	16–5	Jamie Mullarkey	TKO (punches)	UFC Fight Night: Song vs. Gutiérrez	December 9, 2023	1	1:44	Las Vegas, Nevada, United States	Performance of the Night.
Win	15–5	Landon Quiñones	Decision (unanimous)	UFC 293	September 10, 2023	3	5:00	Sydney, Australia	
Win	14–5	John Makdessi	Decision (unanimous)	UFC Fight Night: Gane vs. Tuivasa	September 3, 2022	3	5:00	Paris, France	
Loss	13–5	Bobby Green	Decision (unanimous)	UFC 271	February 12, 2022	3	5:00	Houston, Texas, United States	
Loss	13–4	Dan Hooker	Decision (unanimous)	UFC 266	September 25, 2021	3	5:00	Las Vegas, Nevada, United States	
Win	13–3	Rafa García	Decision (unanimous)	UFC Fight Night: Edwards vs. Muhammad	March 13, 2021	3	5:00	Las Vegas, Nevada, United States	
Win	12–3	Alexander Muñoz	Decision (unanimous)	UFC Fight Night: Lewis vs. Oleinik	August 8, 2020	3	5:00	Las Vegas, Nevada, United States	
Loss	11–3	Drew Dober	KO (punches)	UFC 246	January 18, 2020	1	1:10	Las Vegas, Nevada, United States	
Win	11–2	Joaquim Silva	KO (punches)	UFC on ESPN: Covington vs. Lawler	August 3, 2019	2	0:36	Newark, New Jersey, United States	Performance of the Night.
Win	10–2	Thibault Gouti	Decision (unanimous)	UFC Fight Night: Volkan vs. Smith	October 27, 2018	3	5:00	Moncton, New Brunswick, Canada	Fight of the Night.
Win	9–2	Marc Diakiese	Decision (unanimous)	UFC Fight Night: Shogun vs. Smith	July 22, 2018	3	5:00	Hamburg, Germany	
Loss	8–2	Marcin Held	Decision (unanimous)	UFC Fight Night: Cowboy vs. Till	October 21, 2017	3	5:00	Gdańsk, Poland	
Win	8–1	Ruslan Kalyniuk	TKO (punches)	Superior FC 17	May 20, 2017	3	1:44	Dueren, Germany	
Win	7–1	Patrik Berisha	TKO (punches)	We Love MMA 24	October 15, 2016	2	0:18	Hamburg, Germany	
Win	6–1	Lampros Pistikos	TKO (punches)	Ravage Series 2	February 20, 2016	1	3:36	Hamburg, Germany	Return to Lightweight.
Win	5–1	Fabrice Kindombe	KO (punch)	We Love MMA 16	October 10, 2015	1	0:53	Hamburg, Germany	
Win	4–1	Patrick Schwellnus	TKO (punches)	We Love MMA 13	March 14, 2015	1	2:57	Hannover, Germany	
Win	3–1	Tolga Ozgun	TKO (punches)	We Love MMA 9	September 27, 2014	1	2:20	Hamburg, Germany	Welterweight debut.
Win	2–1	Jiri Flajsar	TKO (punches)	Anatolia FC 1	February 23, 2014	1	0:38	Hamburg, Germany	
Win	1–1	Iles Ganijev	TKO (punches)	Superior FC 13	June 1, 2013	1	N/A	Hamburg, Germany	
Loss	0–1	Adrian Ruf	Submission (triangle choke)	We Love MMA 4	December 15, 2012	1	3:30	Berlin, Germany	Lightweight debut.

== See also ==
- List of current UFC fighters
- List of male mixed martial artists
