= The Ultimate Fighter: Brazil 4 =

UFC mixed martial arts television series and event in 201 5

- Season 4
- Starring: Dana White, Anderson Silva, Antônio Rodrigo Nogueira, and Maurício Rua

Release
- Original network: Globo
- Original release: April 5 – June 21, 2015

Season chronology
- ← Previous; The Ultimate Fighter: Brazil 3

The Ultimate Fighter: Brazil 4 was an installment of the Ultimate Fighting Championship (UFC)-produced reality television series The Ultimate Fighter. It was the eighth international series and the fourth to feature mainly Brazilian fighters.

On October 29, 2014, it was announced that the coaches for the season would be Anderson Silva and Maurício Rua. Despite being coaches on the show, they were not expected to face each other at the end of the season. After Silva tested positive for anabolic steroids in a pre-fight drug test for UFC 183, Dana White initially announced that Silva would remain on the show as a coach. Subsequently, Silva was pulled as one of the coaches and was replaced by Antônio Rodrigo Nogueira.

The UFC held open tryouts for the show on October 27, 2014. The casting call was for Bantamweight and Lightweight fighters who are at least 21 years old and have a minimum of two wins in three professional fights. The open tryout session drew more than 600 UFC hopefuls to Brazil's Windsor Barra Hotel just two days after UFC 179. It was also announced that for the first time in The Ultimate Fighter: Brazil's history, filming would take place at Las Vegas. The cast was revealed on March 18, 2015.

== Cast ==
=== Teams ===
Team Anderson / Nogueira

- Anderson Silva, head coach (Episodes 1–3)
- Antônio Rodrigo Nogueira, head coach (Episode 3-)
- Antônio Rogério Nogueira (Episode 3-)
- Ramon Lemos
- Rogério Camões
- Edelson Silva
- Richardson Moreira
- Kenny Johnson

Team Shogun

- Maurício Rua, head coach
- Eduardo Alonso
- Demian Maia
- Wagner Mota
- Michael Costa
- Dave Esposito
- Kody Hamrah
- Ivan de Oliveira

=== Fighters ===
- Team Anderson
  - Bantamweights: Bruno Gustavo da Silva, Matheus Mattos, Reginaldo Vieira, and Leandro Higo.
  - Lightweights: Erick da Silva, Fernando Bruno, Nikolas Motta, and André Ricardo.
- Team Shogun
  - Bantamweights: Bruno Korea, Dileno Lopes, Matheus Nicolau, and Giovanni Santos.
  - Lightweights: Joaquim Silva, Nazareno Malegarie, Glaico França, and Adílson Fernandes.
- Fighters eliminated during entry round
  - Bantamweights: Franklyn Santos, Renato Mônaco, Mateus Vasco, Gustavo Sedório, Marcos Lima, Peter Montibeller, Eduardo Diez, and Maycon Silvan.

== Episodes ==
Episode 1: (April 5, 2015)

- The episode starts with the fighters arriving in Las Vegas. They visit the UFC Training Center and Dana White comes to greet them with both coaches: Anderson Silva and Maurício Rua. Silva and Rua expressed their desires about respect and commitment to the opportunity all fighters were receiving and hoped they would all respect each other as the season goes by.
- The fighters get the chance to watch Silva's fight at UFC 183 against Nick Diaz.
- The fights to get into the house were divided into two parts, half on this episode and half on the second episode.
- The 16 preliminary fights began:

Bruno Korea defeated Franklyn Santos via knockout (spinning hook kick) in the first round.
Joaquim Silva defeated Carlos Costa via TKO (punches) in the third round.
Dileno Lopes defeated Renato Mônaco via submission (rear-naked choke) in the first round.
Nazareno Malegarie defeated Edson Pereira via unanimous decision after two rounds.
Matheus Nicolau defeated Mateus Vasco via submission (rear-naked choke) in the first round.
Glaico França defeated Raush Manfio via submission (rear-naked choke) in the second round.
Bruno Silva defeated Gustavo Sedório via TKO (jaw injury) in the first round.
Erick da Silva defeated Gabriel Macário via TKO (punches and elbows) in the second round.

Episode 2: (April 12, 2015)

- The 16 preliminary fights continued:

Matheus Mattos defeated Marcos Lima via TKO (punches) in the second round.
Adílson Fernandes defeated Arlen Viana via submission (arm triangle choke) in the second round.
Reginaldo Vieira defeated Peter Montibeller via submission (guillotine choke) in the first round.
Fernando Bruno defeated Bruno Murata via submission (rear-naked choke) in the third round.
Giovanni Santos defeated Eduardo Diez via unanimous decision after two rounds.
Nikolas Motta defeated Alexandre Cidade via unanimous decision after three rounds.
Leandro Higo defeated Maycon Silvan via submission (arm triangle choke) in the first round.
André Ricardo defeated Jeferson Negrini via TKO (kick to the body and punches) in the second round.

- Antônio Rodrigo Nogueira appears as a special guest and flips a coin (blue for Anderson, red for Shogun) to decide who would get first pick (either first fight or first fighter). Rua wins it and opts to choose the first fight.
- Lightweights selection:

Coach	1st Pick	2nd Pick	3rd Pick	4th Pick
Anderson	André Ricardo	Nikolas Motta	Erick da Silva	Fernando Bruno
Shogun	Nazareno Malegarie	Glaico França	Joaquim Silva	Adílson Fernandes

- Bantamweights selection:

Coach	1st Pick	2nd Pick	3rd Pick	4th Pick
Anderson	Matheus Mattos	Leandro Higo	Reginaldo Vieira	Bruno Silva
Shogun	Matheus Nicolau	Dileno Lopes	Bruno Korea	Giovanni Santos

- Rua announces the first fight and matches Nicolau against Vieira.

Episode 3: (April 19, 2015)

- Silva receives a call from his manager, Ed Soares, informing him that he failed his pre-fight drug test for UFC 183. After several moments of denying any use of prohibited substances to his teammates and manager, Silva and his team have a meeting to inform that he will no longer be able to coach as the Nevada State Athletic Commission has suspended him from any activities related to the sport while an investigation is held.
- Silva announces that his coaching staff will remain on the show and Antônio Rodrigo Nogueira will replace him as head coach of the blue team, while his brother Antônio Rogério Nogueira will be added to the coaching staff. Everyone in the room is moved by the situation.
- White introduces the Nogueira brothers to their team, who asked for their fighters to remain focused on the tournament. Silva says farewell to his former team and admits that leaving so early makes him feel defeated.
- Matheus Nicolau defeated Reginaldo Vieira via unanimous decision after three rounds.
- The next fight is announced: Nazareno Malegarie vs. André Ricardo.

Episode 4: (April 26, 2015)

- Nazareno Malegarie defeated André Ricardo via TKO (punches and elbows) in the second round.
- The next fight is announced: Dileno Lopes vs. Bruno Silva.

Episode 5: (May 3, 2015)

- Dileno Lopes defeated Bruno Silva via submission (guillotine choke) in the first round.
- The next fight is announced: Glaico França vs. Nikolas Motta.

Episode 6: (May 10, 2015)

- Glaico França defeated Nikolas Motta via submission (rear-naked choke) in the second round.
- The next fight is announced: Bruno Korea vs. Leandro Higo.

Episode 7: (May 17, 2015)

- Giovanni Santos injures his shoulder and foot, but he doesn't sustain serious damage. He's able to continue in the competition.
- Bruno Korea defeated Leandro Higo via submission (rear-naked choke) in the first round.
- The next fight is announced: Joaquim Silva vs. Erick da Silva.

Episode 8: (May 24, 2015)

- Giovanni Santos' dealing with an infection and has a hard time going through the antibiotics and symptoms of it. After struggling to continue, he decides to leave as he doesn't feel healthy enough to train and fight. Dana White gathers everyone in the gym to ask him if he wants to quit. After hesitating to answer, he finally says he quit. White seems to be a little upset at Santos and tells him that he should leave at that moment as they would take him back to Brazil. Santos confesses that he's feeling very bad about leaving the competition.
- White says Santos may be a good guy, but "he wasn't able to handle the competition". He decides to give Leangro Higo a second chance. Higo is hesitant due to having a small injury and also fears he won't be able to make weight. White tells him to not feel pressured into taking the spot, but a still reluctant Higo accepts it. He faces off against Matheus Mattos, but does not make eye contact. Mattos urges Higo to look at him during the staredown.
- Joaquim Silva defeated Erick da Silva via unanimous decision after three rounds.
- After the fight, Higo tells Antônio Rodrigo Nogueira that his injury has worsened. He asks for a doctor, who advises him to really consider taking the fight as the pain will not go away quickly.
- Nogueira announces that Higo withdrew and Reginaldo Vieira will take his spot. Vieira and Mattos face off.

Episode 9: (May 31, 2015)

- Vieira and Mattos are close friends but both fighters share the same desire to win the tournament and they know it's just part of their professionalism. They do not let the upcoming duel interfere in their friendship.
- Reginaldo Vieira defeated Matheus Mattos via unanimous decision after two rounds.
- The final preliminary fight is announced: Adílson Fernandes vs. Fernando Bruno.

Episode 10: (June 7, 2015)

- Fernando Bruno defeated Adílson Fernandes via unanimous decision after two rounds.
- The semi finals are announced:
  - Lightweight: Joaquim Silva vs. Glaico França and Nazareno Malegarie vs. Fernando Bruno.
  - Bantamweight: Dileno Lopes vs. Matheus Nicolau and Bruno Korea vs. Reginaldo Vieira.

Episode 11: (June 14, 2015)

- Glaico França defeated Joaquim Silva via submission (rear-naked choke) in the first round.
- This season's "Coaches Challenge" put Rua and Nogueira against each other in a "dig it" competition while driving excavators. Rua won the competition earning $10,000 for his team ($1,500 per fighter).
- Dileno Lopes defeated Matheus Nicolau via unanimous decision after three rounds.

Episode 12: (June 21, 2015)

- Reginaldo Vieira defeated Bruno Korea via submission (guillotine choke) in the second round.
- Fernando Bruno defeated Nazareno Malegarie via unanimous decision after three rounds.

== Tournament Bracket ==
=== Bantamweight Bracket ===
Elimination Round
Matheus Nicolau	UD
Reginaldo Vieira	3
Dileno Lopes	SUB
Bruno Silva	1
Bruno Korea	SUB
Leandro Higo	1
Reginaldo Vieira *	UD
Matheus Mattos	2

Semi-finals
Matheus Nicolau	3
Dileno Lopes	UD
Bruno Korea	2
Reginaldo Vieira	SUB

Finale
Dileno Lopes	3
Reginaldo Vieira	UD

* Giovanni Santos decided to leave the competition due to feeling unhealthy after having an infection and was replaced by Higo, who had previously lost his first round fight. Higo subsequently withdrew after an injury contracted on his fight got worsened. Vieira was selected as his replacement, who also lost his first round fight.

=== Lightweight Bracket ===
Elimination Round
Joaquim Silva	UD
Erick da Silva	3
Glaico França	SUB
Nikolas Motta	2
Nazareno Malegarie	TKO
André Ricardo	2
Adílson Fernandes	2
Fernando Bruno	UD

Semi-finals
Joaquim Silva	1
Glaico França	SUB
Nazareno Malegarie	3
Fernando Bruno	UD

Finale
Glaico França	SUB
Fernando Bruno	3

Legend
	Team Anderson / Nogueira
	Team Shogun
UD	Unanimous Decision
SUB	Submission
(T)K	(Technical) Knock Out

== Finale ==
After several changes in location and venue, the finale was contested on August 1, 2015, at UFC 190.

== See also ==
- The Ultimate Fighter
