= Amanda Brundage =

American mixed martial artist (born 1991)

- Born: October 22, 1991 (age 35); Bath, Michigan, U.S.
- Other names: ABC
- Height: 5 ft 3 in (1.60 m)
- Weight: 115 lb (52 kg; 8.2 st)
- Division: Strawweight
- Reach: 64 in (163 cm)
- Style: Boxing, Brazilian jiu-jitsu
- Fighting out of: Denver, Colorado, United States
- Team: Scorpion Fighting System (until 2020); Factory X (2020–present)
- Rank: Purple belt in Brazilian Jiu-Jitsu
- Years active: 2015–2019

Professional boxing record
- Total: 3
- Wins: 2
- By knockout: 1
- Losses: 1

Mixed martial arts record
- Total: 9
- Wins: 4
- By knockout: 2
- By submission: 1
- By decision: 1
- Losses: 5
- By submission: 4
- By decision: 1

Other information
- Website: https://twitter.com/ABCNation115
- Boxing record from BoxRec
- Mixed martial arts record from Sherdog

Amanda Bobby Brundage (née Cooper, born October 22, 1991) is an American former professional mixed martial artist who competed in the Strawweight division of the Invicta Fighting Championships (Invicta FC) and Ultimate Fighting Championship (UFC).

== Mixed martial arts career ==
=== King of the Cage ===
Cooper made her professional MMA debut with the King of the Cage promotion in February 2014. She defeated Brittany Dugas by armbar submission in the second round.

=== Invicta FC ===
Cooper next fought for Invicta FC in September 2015. She lost to Aspen Ladd at Invicta 14.

=== The Ultimate Fighter ===
In April 2016, it was announced that Cooper would be a contestant on The Ultimate Fighter: Team Joanna vs. Team Cláudia. She defeated Mellony Geugjes in the opening qualifying round to gain entry into the house.

At The Ultimate Fighter: Team Joanna vs. Team Cláudia finale, she lost to Tatiana Suarez in the women's strawweight final.

=== Ultimate Fighting Championship ===
Cooper faced Anna Elmose at UFC Fight Night 99. She won the fight via unanimous decision.

Cooper faced TUF 20 contestant Angela Magaña at UFC 218 on December 2, 2017. She won the fight by TKO in the second round, giving Cooper her first win via TKO.

Cooper faced Mackenzie Dern on May 12, 2018 at UFC 224. At the weigh-ins, Dern weighed in at 123 pounds, 7 pounds over the strawweight non-title fight upper limit of 116 pounds. As a result, the bout proceeded at catchweight and Dern was fined 30% of her purse. Cooper lost the bout via submission in the first round.

In what marked the last fight of her contract, Cooper faced Ashley Yoder on November 10, 2018 UFC Fight Night 139. She lost the fight via a split decision. UFC opted not to renew her contract after the fight.

=== Post-UFC career ===
On July 17, 2019, it was reported that Cooper was signed by Invicta Fighting Championships.

Cooper defeated Jamie Milanowski via first-round TKO at Lights Out Championship 5 on September 7, 2019

== Personal life ==
Amanda is married to Cody Brundage, a fellow mixed martial artist with whom she has a daughter, Kingsley.

== Mixed martial arts record ==
Professional record breakdown
| 9 matches | 4 wins | 5 losses |
| By knockout | 2 | 0 |
| By submission | 1 | 4 |
| By decision | 1 | 1 |

| Res. | Record | Opponent | Method | Event | Date | Round | Time | Location | Notes |
|---|---|---|---|---|---|---|---|---|---|
| Win | 4–5 | Jamie Milanowski | TKO (elbows) | Lights Out Championship 5 | September 7, 2019 | 1 | 4:16 | Grand Rapids, Michigan, United States | |
| Loss | 3–5 | Ashley Yoder | Decision (split) | UFC Fight Night: The Korean Zombie vs. Rodríguez | November 10, 2018 | 3 | 5:00 | Denver, Colorado, United States | |
| Loss | 3–4 | Mackenzie Dern | Submission (rear-naked choke) | UFC 224 | May 12, 2018 | 1 | 2:27 | Rio de Janeiro, Brazil | Catchweight (123 lb) bout; Dern missed weight. |
| Win | 3–3 | Angela Magaña | TKO (punches) | UFC 218 | December 2, 2017 | 2 | 4:32 | Detroit, Michigan, United States | |
| Loss | 2–3 | Cynthia Calvillo | Submission (rear-naked choke) | UFC 209 | March 4, 2017 | 1 | 3:19 | Las Vegas, Nevada, United States | |
| Win | 2–2 | Anna Elmose | Decision (unanimous) | UFC Fight Night: Mousasi vs. Hall 2 | November 19, 2016 | 3 | 5:00 | Belfast, Northern Ireland | |
| Loss | 1–2 | Tatiana Suarez | Submission (D'Arce choke) | The Ultimate Fighter: Team Joanna vs. Team Cláudia Finale | July 8, 2016 | 1 | 3:43 | Las Vegas, Nevada, United States | Lost The Ultimate Fighter 23 Women's Strawweight Tournament final. |
| Loss | 1–1 | Aspen Ladd | Submission (armbar) | Invicta FC 14: Evinger vs. Kianzad | September 12, 2015 | 2 | 4:42 | Kansas City, Missouri, United States | Flyweight bout. |
| Win | 1–0 | Brittany Dugas | Submission (armbar) | KOTC: Unrestricted | February 15, 2014 | 2 | 4:59 | Walker, Minnesota, United States | |
