= Matheus Nicolau =

Brazilian mixed martial artist (born 1993)

- Born: Matheus Nicolau Pereira; January 6, 1993 (age 33); Belo Horizonte, Minas Gerais, Brazil
- Height: 5 ft 6 in (1.68 m)
- Weight: 125 lb (57 kg; 8.9 st)
- Division: Flyweight (2010 – 2019, 2021 – present); Bantamweight (2015, 2019 – 2021)
- Reach: 66 in (168 cm)
- Fighting out of: Rio de Janeiro, Brazil
- Team: Jackson's MMA; Yee MMA
- Rank: Black belt in Brazilian jiu-jitsu
- Years active: 2010–present

Mixed martial arts record
- Total: 25
- Wins: 19
- By knockout: 5
- By submission: 5
- By decision: 9
- Losses: 5
- By knockout: 4
- By decision: 1
- Draws: 1

Other information
- Mixed martial arts record from Sherdog

Matheus Nicolau Pereira (born January 6, 1993) is a Brazilian professional mixed martial artist who competed in the Flyweight division of the Ultimate Fighting Championship (UFC). He has also competed in the Brave Combat Federation (Brave CF) and the Future FC.

== Mixed martial arts career ==
Nicolau made his professional mixed martial arts debut in August 2010 at the age of 17. He compiled a record of 10-1-1, competing primarily for various regional promotions in Brazil before trying out for The Ultimate Fighter in early 2015.

=== The Ultimate Fighter ===
In March 2015, it was announced that Nicolau was one of the fighters selected to be on The Ultimate Fighter: Brazil 4.

In his first fight on the show, Nicolau faced Mateus Vasco. He won the fight via submission (rear-naked choke) in the first round.

In the quarterfinals, Nicolau faced off against Reginaldo Vieira. He won the fight via unanimous decision after three rounds.

In the semifinals, Nicolau faced Dileno Lopes. He lost via unanimous decision.

=== Ultimate Fighting Championship ===
Nicolau made his official debut for the promotion on November 7, 2015 at UFC Fight Night 77 where he faced fellow castmate Bruno Rodrigues. He won the fight submission in the third round.

Nicolau next faced John Moraga on July 8, 2016 at The Ultimate Fighter 23 Finale. He won the fight via split decision.

Nicolau was expected to face Ulka Sasaki on November 19, 2016 at UFC Fight Night 100. However Nicolau was pulled from the bout on November 3 after the USADA revealed a potential anti-doping violation from a sample that was taken October 13.

Nicolau faced Louis Smolka on December 30, 2017 at UFC 219. He won the fight via unanimous decision.

Nicolau faced Dustin Ortiz on July 28, 2018 at UFC on Fox 30. He lost the fight via knockout due to a head kick and follow-up punches in the first round.

In February 2019, news surfaced that Nicolau had been released from the UFC.

=== Future FC ===
After being released from the UFC, Nicolau signed with Brazilian mixed martial arts promotion Future FC where he fought in the bantamweight division. In his promotional debut he faced Alan Gabriel at Future FC 5 on May 24, 2019. He won the fight via anaconda choke.

In August 2019, it was also announced that Nicolau had signed with Brave CF, making his promotional debut against Felipe Efrain at Brave CF 25 on August 31, 2019. Nicolau won the fight via unanimous decision.

In February 2020, news surfaced that Nicolau would be participating in Brave CF Flyweight tournament. In the initial round, Nicolau was expected to face Jose Torres at Brave CF 35 on March 28, 2020. However, the event was postponed until a to-be-determined date due to the COVID-19 pandemic

=== Return to UFC ===
Nicolau was scheduled to face Tagir Ulanbekov on January 24, 2021 at UFC 257. However, Ulanbekov withdrew due to undisclosed reasons. The pairing was eventually rescheduled for UFC Fight Night 187. However, Ulanbekov withdrew from the bout the second time for undisclosed reason and he was replaced by Manel Kape. He won the fight via controversial split decision. 21 out of 21 media members scored the fight for his opponent Kape.

Nicolau faced Tim Elliott on October 9, 2021 at UFC Fight Night 194. He won the fight via unanimous decision.

Nicolau faced David Dvořák on March 26, 2022 at UFC on ESPN 33. He won the fight by unanimous decision.

Nicolau faced Matt Schnell on December 3, 2022 at UFC on ESPN 42. He won the bout via knockout in the second round.

Nicolau faced Brandon Royval on April 15, 2023 at UFC on ESPN 44. He lost the fight via knockout in the first round.

Nicolau was scheduled for a rematch against Manel Kape on January 13, 2024, at UFC Fight Night 234. At the weigh-ins, Kape weighed in at 129.5 pounds, three and a half pounds over the flyweight non-title fight limit, and the bout was cancelled. The pair was rescheduled for April 27, 2024 at UFC on ESPN 55. However, Kape withdrew for unknown reasons and he was replaced by Alex Perez. Nicolau lost the fight to Perez by knockout in the second round.

Nicolau faced Asu Almabayev on October 19, 2024 at UFC Fight Night 245. He lost the fight by unanimous decision.

On October 29, 2024, it was announced that Nicolau was released from the UFC.

== Mixed martial arts record ==
Professional record breakdown
25 matches	19 wins	5 losses
By knockout	5	4
By submission	5	0
By decision	9	1
Draws	1	

Res.	Record	Opponent	Method	Event	Date	Round	Time	Location	Notes
Loss	19–5–1	Asu Almabayev	Decision (unanimous)	UFC Fight Night: Hernandez vs. Pereira	October 19, 2024	3	5:00	Las Vegas, Nevada, United States	
Loss	19–4–1	Alex Perez	KO (punch)	UFC on ESPN: Nicolau vs. Perez	April 27, 2024	2	2:16	Las Vegas, Nevada, United States	
Loss	19–3–1	Brandon Royval	KO (knee and elbows)	UFC on ESPN: Holloway vs. Allen	April 15, 2023	1	2:09	Kansas City, Missouri, United States	
Win	19–2–1	Matt Schnell	KO (punches)	UFC on ESPN: Thompson vs. Holland	December 3, 2022	2	1:44	Orlando, Florida, United States	
Win	18–2–1	David Dvořák	Decision (unanimous)	UFC on ESPN: Blaydes vs. Daukaus	March 26, 2022	3	5:00	Columbus, Ohio, United States	
Win	17–2–1	Tim Elliott	Decision (unanimous)	UFC Fight Night: Dern vs. Rodriguez	October 8, 2021	3	5:00	Las Vegas, Nevada, United States	
Win	16–2–1	Manel Kape	Decision (split)	UFC Fight Night: Edwards vs. Muhammad	March 13, 2021	3	5:00	Las Vegas, Nevada, United States	Return to Flyweight.
Win	15–2–1	Felipe Efrain	Decision (unanimous)	Brave CF 25	August 30, 2019	3	5:00	Belo Horizonte, Brazil	
Win	14–2–1	Alan Gabriel	Submission (Japanese necktie)	Future FC 5	May 24, 2019	1	1:18	São Paulo, Brazil	Return to Bantamweight.
Loss	13–2–1	Dustin Ortiz	KO (head kick and punches)	UFC on Fox: Alvarez vs. Poirier 2	July 28, 2018	1	3:49	Calgary, Alberta, Canada	
Win	13–1–1	Louis Smolka	Decision (unanimous)	UFC 219	December 30, 2017	3	5:00	Las Vegas, Nevada, United States	
Win	12–1–1	John Moraga	Decision (split)	The Ultimate Fighter: Team Joanna vs. Team Cláudia Finale	July 8, 2016	3	5:00	Las Vegas, Nevada, United States	
Win	11–1–1	Bruno Mesquita	Submission (Japanese necktie)	UFC Fight Night: Belfort vs. Henderson 3	November 7, 2015	3	3:27	São Paulo, Brazil	Bantamweight bout.
Win	10–1–1	Derinaldo Guerra da Silva	KO (punch)	Shooto Brazil 49	August 24, 2014	2	4:35	Rio de Janeiro, Brazil	
Win	9–1–1	Pedro Arruda	KO (punch)	Brazil Fight 8	June 6, 2014	1	2:49	Belo Horizonte, Brazil	
Win	8–1–1	Vanderlei Carvalho Leite	Decision (unanimous)	Shooto Brazil 45	December 20, 2013	3	5:00	Rio de Janeiro, Brazil	
Loss	7–1–1	Pedro Nobre	TKO (punches)	Bitetti Combat 13	December 9, 2012	1	3:11	Rio de Janeiro, Brazil	Bitetti Combat Flyweight Tournament Final.
Win	7–0–1	Denison Silva	Decision (unanimous)	Bitetti Combat 13	December 9, 2012	2	5:00	Rio de Janeiro, Brazil	Bitetti Combat Flyweight Tournament Semifinal.
Win	6–0–1	Larry Passos Vargas	KO (punches)	Brazil Fight 6	September 21, 2012	3	4:09	Belo Horizonte, Brazil	
Win	5–0–1	Gilberto Dias	Decision (unanimous)	Shooto Brazil 31	June 29, 2012	3	5:00	Brasília, Brazil	
Win	4–0–1	Michael Daboville	Submission (triangle choke)	Lions FC 2	March 12, 2012	1	N/A	Neuchâtel, Switzerland	
Win	3–0–1	Damien Pighiera	Submission (arm-triangle choke)	Lions FC 1	October 15, 2011	2	4:26	Neuchâtel, Switzerland	
Draw	2–0–1	Larry Passos Vargas	Draw (unanimous)	Brazil Fight 5	September 3, 2011	3	5:00	Belo Horizonte, Brazil	
Win	2–0	Fernando Silva	TKO (doctor stoppage)	Brazil Fight 4	April 9, 2011	2	N/A	Nova Lima, Brazil	
Win	1–0	Pedro Alves Chalita	Submission (rear-naked choke)	Pedro Leopoldo Extreme Fight	August 7, 2010	1	1:35	Pedro Leopoldo, Brazil	

== Mixed martial arts exhibition record ==
Professional record breakdown
3 matches	2 wins	1 loss
By submission	1	0
By decision	1	1

Res.	Record	Opponent	Method	Event	Date	Round	Time	Location	Notes
Loss	2–1	Dileno Lopes	Decision (unanimous)	The Ultimate Fighter: Brazil 4	June 14, 2015 (airdate)	3	5:00	Las Vegas, Nevada, United States	The Ultimate Fighter: Brazil 4 Semifinals round
Win	2–0	Reginaldo Vieira	Decision (unanimous)	The Ultimate Fighter: Brazil 4	April 21, 2015 (airdate)	3	5:00	Las Vegas, Nevada, United States	The Ultimate Fighter: Brazil 4 Quarterfinals round
Win	1–0	Mateus Vasco	Submission (rear-naked choke)	The Ultimate Fighter: Brazil 4	April 14, 2015 (airdate)	1	3:46	Las Vegas, Nevada, United States	The Ultimate Fighter: Brazil 4 Entry round

== See also ==
- List of male mixed martial artists
