= Manel Kape =

Angolan-Portuguese mixed martial artist (born 1993)

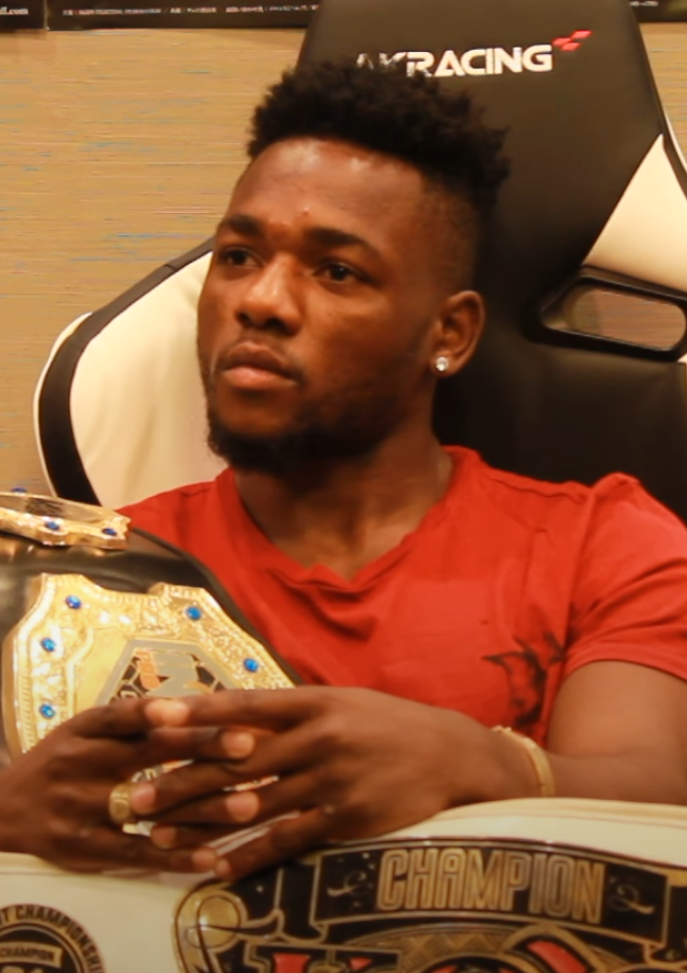
- Kape in 2017
- Born: Manuel Pedro Gomes; November 14, 1993 (age 33); Luanda, Angola
- Nickname: Starboy
- Citizenship: Angola; Portugal
- Height: 5 ft 5 in (1.65 m)
- Weight: 125 lb (57 kg; 8 st 13 lb)
- Division: Flyweight (2012–2014, 2021–present); Bantamweight (2014–2019)
- Reach: 68 in (173 cm)
- Fighting out of: Porto, Portugal
- Team: AKA Thailand
- Rank: Black belt in Brazilian jiu-jitsu
- Years active: 2012–present

Mixed martial arts record
- Total: 30
- Wins: 23
- By knockout: 15
- By submission: 5
- By decision: 3
- Losses: 7
- By submission: 2
- By decision: 5

Other information
- Mixed martial arts record from Sherdog

Manuel Pedro Gomes (born November 14, 1993), known as Manel Kape, is an Angolan-Portuguese professional mixed martial artist. He currently competes in the Flyweight division of the Ultimate Fighting Championship (UFC). A professional since 2012, he has formerly competed for Cage Fighters, Knock Out Championship, and Rizin Fighting Federation. He is the former Rizin Bantamweight Champion and the former Knock Out Championship Bantamweight champion. As of September 19, 2026, he is #1 in the Meta UFC flyweight rankings.

== Mixed martial arts career ==
=== Early career ===
Kape had several boxing matches prior to beginning his mixed martial arts career, all of which occurred before his first MMA fight at the age of 14.

He made his professional debut at 17, fighting with Cage Fighters, at Cage Fighters 2, when he faced Artur Gomes. Kape won the bout in the first round by way of TKO. Fighting at Cage Fighters - Challengers Norte 1 he was scheduled to face Renato Ferreira. He made quick work of his opponent, ending the fight by TKO, after just 45 seconds. Next he fought Ricardo Teixeira, earning his first submission win, ending the fight in the first round with a rear naked choke. His last fight with Cage Fighters was at Cage Fighters 3, when he fought Marco Santos. He won the fight with a unanimous decision.

Moving to Knock Out Championship he fought Souksavanh Khampasath. He would suffer his first professional loss, losing through a rear naked choke. Recouping, he fought Hicham Rachid at Invictus 1, and won the fight with a flying knee to the body. He next fought at Ansgar Fighting League 2, against Daniel Barez. He beat Barez through a verbal tapout, forced by a tight armbar cinched by Kape. Returning to the second Invictus event, Kape faced Miguel Valverde. He won the fight with a rear naked choke in the first round. He was then scheduled to fight Antoine Gallinaro. Kape won the fight in the fourth round through an armbar, which earned him the KOC Bantamweight title. Kape continued his winning streak by beating Francisco Javier Asprilla by way of a third-round TKO.

Kape was scheduled to fight Damien ‘The Rage’ Rooney at BAMMA 22 in the 3Arena in Dublin. Kape would later pull out of the bout. Kape was then set to fight against the Brazilian João Elias, but the fight would likewise be cancelled. Manel Kape was scheduled to fight at Knock Out Championship 9 against Moktar Benkaci for the KOC bantamweight championship. This would be the third consecutive fight that fizzled out for Manel Kape.

=== Rizin Fighting Federation ===
Following a two-year hiatus, due to the three canceled bouts, Kape would sign with Rizin Fighting Federation and was set to take part in the Rizin bantamweight Grand Prix. He made his debut at Rizin 6 when he faced Erson Yamamoto. Yamamoto was confused by Kape's trash-talk during the fight, as he allegedly said "[your] mom just lost and [you] are next", since Erson's mother had lost earlier in the evening. Kape would go on to win the fight after just 71 seconds with a left leg head kick KO, although the stoppage was considered early by many observers.

In the second round of the Grand Prix, Kape was scheduled to fight the former Tachi Palace flyweight champion Ian McCall. The two got into a physical altercation at the weigh-ins, with Kape slapping McCall and McCall responding with a strike to the face of Kape. The two had to be separated by the officials present. Kape would win the fight by Doctor Stoppage TKO in the second minute of the first round, after the ringside doctors stopped the fight due to a cut.

In the Grand Prix semifinals he fought one of the world's best bantamweights in Kyoji Horiguchi. Although Kape gave his opponent a competitive fight, he would lose the bout in the third round, after Horiguchi locked in an arm triangle choke.

Kape was scheduled to fight Kai Asakura Rizin 10. He would lose a split decision, in a close and exciting fight, which would be nominated as the Fight of the Month by MMA Junkie.

At Rizin 13, Kape was scheduled to face Yusaku Nakamura. Kape beat Nakamura with a rear naked choke at the end of the third round.

Kape's next fight was against Ulka Sasaki. Sasaki would win a comfortable unanimous decision combining good striking with a strong ground game to beat Kape.

Kape was to fight the ZST flyweight champion Seiichiro Ito at Rizin 15. Kape defeated Ito with a strong left hook to the body, which gave him a KO win in the second round.

At Rizin 18, Kape was scheduled to fight the 14 fight UFC veteran and former World Extreme Cagefighting bantamweight title challenger Takeya Mizugaki. Kape would earn a dominant second-round KO win, stunning Mizugaki with a powerful uppercut, before landing a right hook to the jaw of Mizugaki. Following the win, Kape called out the Rizin bantamweight champion Kyoji Horiguchi.

Kyoji Horiguchi would in the meantime vacate the belt due to a knee injury. Kape was scheduled to fight Kai Asakura in a rematch, this time with the vacant bantamweight title on the line. The fight was preceded with peculiar trash-talk, as Kape tore a cardboard cutout of Kai Asakura, declaring "You are already dead", and proceeding to chew up the cardboard remains. During the fight itself, Asakura tried to make use of his reach to outfight, while Kape looked to blitz in and land strikes. He would find success in the second round, earning a TKO victory following a barrage of punches. This win would earn him a Fighter of the Year nomination for the Asian MMA awards.

=== Ultimate Fighting Championship ===
On March 30, 2020, Kape announced that he had signed a four-fight deal with the Ultimate Fighting Championship, becoming first Portuguese-Angolan fighter to be signed with the UFC.

Kape was expected to make his promotional debut against Rogério Bontorin on August 15, 2020, at UFC 252. The fight was later canceled, as Bontorin suffered an ankle injury.

Kape was scheduled to fight Alexandre Pantoja December 19, 2020, at UFC Fight Night 183. However, Pantoja pulled out of the fight in early December due to COVID-19 symptoms. Kape served as a potential replacement for the UFC Flyweight Championship bout between Deiveson Figueiredo and Brandon Moreno a week earlier at UFC 256. The pairing was rescheduled on February 6, 2021 at UFC Fight Night: Overeem vs. Volkov. Kape lost the fight via unanimous decision.

Kape faced Matheus Nicolau, as a replacement for Tagir Ulanbekov, on March 13, 2021, at UFC Fight Night 187. He lost the fight via controversial split decision. 21 out of 21 media members scored the fight for Kape.

Kape faced Ode' Osbourne on August 7, 2021, at UFC 265. At the weigh-ins, Kape weighed in at 129 pounds, three pounds over the flyweight non-title fight limit. The bout proceeded at catchweight and Kape was fined 20% of his purse, which went to Osbourne. He won the fight via knockout in round one after connecting with a flying knee and following it up with punches.

Kape faced Zhalgas Zhumagulov on December 4, 2021, at UFC on ESPN 31. He won the fight via technical knockout in round one.

Kape was scheduled to face Su Mudaerji on April 23, 2022, at UFC Fight Night 205. However, just three days before the event, the bout was scrapped after Kape tested positive for a metabolite of the banned substance DHCMT (specifically the M3 metabolite). The detected level was 17 picograms per milliliter, which is below the USADA threshold for a violation (100 pg/mL) but triggered a review by the Nevada State Athletic Commission (NSAC). Consequently, the commission required Kape to undergo a six-month monitoring program before he could be licensed to fight in Nevada again, though he remained eligible to compete in other jurisdictions.

Kape was scheduled to face Rogério Bontorin on June 11, 2022, at UFC 275. However, the bout was scrapped the day before the event due to Bontorin suffering kidney issues related to cutting weight.

Kape faced David Dvořák on December 17, 2022, at UFC Fight Night 216. He won the fight via unanimous decision.

Kape was scheduled to face Alex Perez on March 25, 2023, at UFC on ESPN 43. However, the pairing was canceled on the day of the event as Perez suffered a seizure backstage.

Kape was scheduled to face Deiveson Figueiredo on July 8, 2023, at UFC 290. However, Figueiredo withdrew after he was not medically cleared to compete and the bout as scrapped.

Kape was scheduled to face former flyweight champion Deiveson Figueiredo on July 8, 2023, at UFC 290. However, on April 26, Figueiredo stated that he had not signed the bout agreement and was not medically cleared to compete, citing eye issues. Despite the fighter's claims, the promotion officially announced the bout on May 10. During the UFC on ABC: Rozenstruik vs. Almeida post-fight press conference on May 13, UFC President Dana White expressed frustration with the situation, stating that Figueiredo was cleared to fight but if he refused, the bout would be scrapped. The bout ultimately did not materialize.

Kape was scheduled to face Kai Kara-France on September 10, 2023, at UFC 293. However Kara-France pulled out of the fight in late August after suffering a concussion during training, and was replaced by promotional newcomer Felipe dos Santos. Kape won the fight via unanimous decision. The win also earned Kape his first Fight of the Night bonus award.

Kape was scheduled for a rematch against Matheus Nicolau on January 13, 2024, at UFC Fight Night 234. At the weigh-ins, Kape weighed in at 129.5 pounds, three and a half pounds over the flyweight non-title fight limit, and the bout was cancelled. The pair was rescheduled for April 27, 2024 at UFC on ESPN 55. However, Kape withdrew for unknown reasons.

Kape faced Muhammad Mokaev on July 27, 2024, at UFC 304. He lost the fight by unanimous decision.

Kape faced Bruno Gustavo da Silva on December 14, 2024, at UFC on ESPN 63. After receiving three low-blows resulting in a point deduction for Silva, Kape won the fight by technical knockout via a body kick and punches in the third round.

Kape was scheduled to face former UFC Flyweight Championship title challenger Brandon Royval on March 1, 2025, at UFC Fight Night 253. However, Royval withdrew due to multiple concussions, and was replaced by Asu Almabayev. Kape won the bout by technical knockout in the third round. This fight earned him a Performance of the Night award.

Kape's bout against Brandon Royval was rescheduled to take place on June 28, 2025, at UFC 317. However, Kape pulled out due to a broken foot and was replaced by Joshua Van. His fight with Royval was re-scheduled and eventually took place on December 13, 2025, at UFC on ESPN 73. He won the fight via knockout in round one. This fight earned him another Performance of the Night award.

Kape faced Kyoji Horiguchi in a rematch on June 20, 2026 in the main event at UFC Fight Night 279. He won the fight by technical knockout in the third round. This fight earned him a $100,000 Performance of the Night award.

Kape is scheduled to compete for the UFC Flyweight Championship against champion Joshua Van on January 30, 2027 at UFC 336.

== Championships and accomplishments ==
=== Mixed martial arts ===
- Ultimate Fighting Championship
  - Fight of the Night (One time) vs. Felipe dos Santos
  - Performance of the Night (Three times) vs. Asu Almabayev, Brandon Royval and Kyoji Horiguchi
  - Most knockouts in UFC Flyweight division history (6)
  - Longest knockout streak in UFC Flyweight division history (4)
  - Tied (Kai Kara-France & Joshua Van) for second most knockdowns in UFC Flyweight division history (8) (behind Deiveson Figueiredo)
  - Tied (Joseph Benavidez, Brandon Moreno & Tatsuro Taira) for fourth most finishes in UFC Flyweight division history (6)
  - Fifth highest significant strike accuracy percentage in UFC Flyweight division history (55.1%)
  - Fifth highest knockdowns-per-fifteen-minutes in UFC Flyweight division history (0.97)
- Rizin Fighting Federation
  - RIZIN Bantamweight Championship (One time)
- Knock Out Championship
  - KOC Bantamweight Championship (One time)
- MMA Fighting
  - 2025 Second Team MMA All-Star

== Mixed martial arts record ==
Professional record breakdown
30 matches	23 wins	7 losses
By knockout	15	0
By submission	5	2
By decision	3	5

Res.	Record	Opponent	Method	Event	Date	Round	Time	Location	Notes
Win	23–7	Kyoji Horiguchi	TKO (punches)	UFC Fight Night: Kape vs. Horiguchi	June 20, 2026	3	2:42	Las Vegas, Nevada, United States	Performance of the Night.
Win	22–7	Brandon Royval	KO (punches)	UFC on ESPN: Royval vs. Kape	December 13, 2025	1	3:18	Las Vegas, Nevada, United States	Performance of the Night.
Win	21–7	Asu Almabayev	TKO (retirement)	UFC Fight Night: Kape vs. Almabayev	March 1, 2025	3	2:16	Las Vegas, Nevada, United States	Performance of the Night.
Win	20–7	Bruno Gustavo da Silva	TKO (body kick and punches)	UFC on ESPN: Covington vs. Buckley	December 14, 2024	3	1:57	Tampa, Florida, United States	Silva was deducted 1 point in round 2 due to repeated groin strikes.
Loss	19–7	Muhammad Mokaev	Decision (unanimous)	UFC 304	July 27, 2024	3	5:00	Manchester, England	
Win	19–6	Felipe dos Santos	Decision (unanimous)	UFC 293	September 10, 2023	3	5:00	Sydney, Australia	Fight of the Night.
Win	18–6	David Dvořák	Decision (unanimous)	UFC Fight Night: Cannonier vs. Strickland	December 17, 2022	3	5:00	Las Vegas, Nevada, United States	
Win	17–6	Zhalgas Zhumagulov	TKO (punches)	UFC on ESPN: Font vs. Aldo	December 4, 2021	1	4:02	Las Vegas, Nevada, United States	
Win	16–6	Ode' Osbourne	KO (flying knee and punches)	UFC 265	August 7, 2021	1	4:44	Houston, Texas, United States	Catchweight (129 lb) bout; Kape missed weight.
Loss	15–6	Matheus Nicolau	Decision (split)	UFC Fight Night: Edwards vs. Muhammad	March 13, 2021	3	5:00	Las Vegas, Nevada, United States	
Loss	15–5	Alexandre Pantoja	Decision (unanimous)	UFC Fight Night: Overeem vs. Volkov	February 6, 2021	3	5:00	Las Vegas, Nevada, United States	Return to Flyweight.
Win	15–4	Kai Asakura	TKO (punches)	Rizin 20	December 31, 2019	2	0:38	Saitama, Japan	Won the vacant Rizin Bantamweight Championship.
Win	14–4	Takeya Mizugaki	KO (punch)	Rizin 18	August 18, 2019	2	1:36	Nagoya, Japan	
Win	13–4	Seiichiro Ito	TKO (punch to the body)	Rizin 15	April 21, 2019	2	3:59	Yokohama, Japan	
Loss	12–4	Ulka Sasaki	Decision (unanimous)	Rizin 14	December 31, 2018	3	5:00	Saitama, Japan	
Win	12–3	Yusaku Nakamura	Technical Submission (rear-naked choke)	Rizin 13	September 30, 2018	3	4:27	Saitama, Japan	Flyweight bout.
Loss	11–3	Kai Asakura	Decision (split)	Rizin 10	May 6, 2018	3	5:00	Fukuoka, Japan	
Loss	11–2	Kyoji Horiguchi	Submission (arm-triangle choke)	Rizin World Grand Prix 2017: Final Round	December 31, 2017	3	4:27	Saitama, Japan	2017 Rizin Bantamweight Grand Prix Semifinal.
Win	11–1	Ian McCall	TKO (doctor stoppage)	Rizin World Grand Prix 2017: 2nd Round	December 29, 2017	1	1:46	Saitama, Japan	2017 Rizin Bantamweight Grand Prix Quarterfinal.
Win	10–1	Erson Yamamoto	TKO (head kick and punch)	Rizin World Grand Prix 2017: Opening Round Part 2	October 15, 2017	1	1:11	Saitama, Japan	2017 Rizin Bantamweight Grand Prix First Round.
Win	9–1	Francisco Javier Asprilla	TKO (punches)	International Pro Combat 7	April 27, 2015	3	4:59	Lisbon, Portugal	
Win	8–1	Antoine Gallinaro	Submission (armbar)	Knock Out Championship 8	April 18, 2015	4	2:26	Cognac, France	Won the KOC Bantamweight Championship.
Win	7–1	Miguel Valverde	Submission (rear-naked choke)	Invictus Pro MMA League 2	December 19, 2014	3	N/A	Porto, Portugal	Bantamweight debut.
Win	6–1	Daniel Barez	Submission (armbar)	Ansgar Fighting League 2	November 29, 2014	1	3:25	Madrid, Spain	
Win	5–1	Hicham Rachid	KO (flying knee to the body)	Invictus Pro MMA League 1	July 27, 2014	1	2:42	Porto, Portugal	
Loss	4–1	Souksavanh Khampasath	Submission (rear-naked choke)	Knock Out Championship 7	April 5, 2014	3	3:27	Cognac, France	
Win	4–0	Marco Santos	Decision (unanimous)	Cage Fighters 3	July 28, 2013	3	5:00	Matosinhos, Portugal	
Win	3–0	Ricardo Teixeira	Submission (rear-naked choke)	Cage Fighters: Challengers Norte 2	February 3, 2013	1	2:38	Matosinhos, Portugal	
Win	2–0	Renato Ferreira	TKO (punches)	Cage Fighters: Challengers Norte 1	November 4, 2012	1	0:45	Matosinhos, Portugal	
Win	1–0	Artur Gomes	TKO (punches)	Cage Fighters 2	May 13, 2012	1	4:27	Matosinhos, Portugal	Flyweight debut.

== See also ==
- List of current UFC fighters
- List of male mixed martial artists
