= Alex Perez (fighter) =

American mixed martial artist

- Born: Alexander Salvador Perez; March 21, 1992 (age 34); Hanford, California, U.S.
- Other names: The Insider
- Height: 5 ft 6 in (1.68 m)
- Weight: 125 lb (57 kg; 8 st 13 lb)
- Division: Flyweight
- Reach: 65 in (165 cm)
- Fighting out of: Lemoore, California, U.S.
- Team: Team Oyama
- Years active: 2011–present

Mixed martial arts record
- Total: 38
- Wins: 26
- By knockout: 7
- By submission: 7
- By decision: 12
- Losses: 11
- By knockout: 2
- By submission: 6
- By decision: 3
- No contests: 1

Other information
- University: West Hills College Lemoore
- Mixed martial arts record from Sherdog

Alexander Salvador Perez (born March 21, 1992) is an American professional mixed martial artist who currently competes in the Flyweight division of the Ultimate Fighting Championship (UFC). As of July 25, 2026, he is #15 in the Meta UFC flyweight rankings.

== Background ==
Perez is of Mexican descent and has eight siblings. He started wrestling in the sixth grade alongside his two brothers Silverio Esparza and Julian Perez. Perez represent West Hills College Lemoore in junior college wrestling and he was the regional champion and All-American wrestler in his sophomore year in college. After Perez completed high school at Lemoore for California Hall of Fame coach Kent Olson, he began helping friends train for their MMA fights due to his wrestling experience.

== Mixed martial arts career ==
=== Early career ===
Perez fought all of his fights in United States where he made his professional debut on May 6, 2011, at TPF 9. He faced Jesus Castro and knockout Castro in round one. He amassed a total of 16–4 before joining Dana White's Contender Series 5, facing Kevin Gray. He defeated Gray, and with the win, he was signed by UFC.

=== Ultimate Fighting Championship ===
Perez made his promotional debut on December 9, 2017, at UFC Fight Night 123 against Carlos John de Tomas. He won the fight via submission in round two.

On February 24, 2018, Perez faced Eric Shelton at UFC on Fox 28. At the weigh-ins, Perez weighed in at 126.5 pounds, a half pound over the flyweight non-title fight upper limit of 126 pounds. As a result, the bout proceeded at catchweight and Perez was fined 20% of his purse which went to Shelton. He won the fight via unanimous decision.

Perez faced Jose Torres on August 9, 2018, at UFC 227. He won the fight via knockout in round one.

Perez faced Joseph Benavidez on November 30, 2018, at The Ultimate Fighter 28 Finale. He lost the fight via technical knockout out in round one.

Perez faced Mark De La Rosa in a bantamweight bout on March 30, 2019, at UFC on ESPN 2. He won the fight via unanimous decision.

Perez was scheduled to face Sergio Pettis on September 21, 2019, at UFC Fight Night 159. However, Perez pulled out of the bout on August 26 citing an injury.

Perez faced Jordan Espinosa on January 25, 2020, at UFC Fight Night 166. He won the fight via an arm-triangle choke in round one. This win earned him the Performance of the Night award. Perez's arm triangle was an on the fly adjustment and the first time he had submitted someone from that position.

Perez was expected to face Kai Kara-France on May 16, 2020 at UFC on ESPN 8. However, on April 9, Dana White, the president of UFC announced that the event would be postponed to a future date due to the COVID-19 pandemic. Instead Perez faced Jussier Formiga on June 6, 2020, at UFC 250. He won the fight via first-round technical knockout. This win earned him the Performance of the Night.

Perez was expected to face Brandon Moreno on November 21, 2020, at UFC 255. However, on October 2, it was announced that Perez would face Deiveson Figueiredo, replacing an injured Cody Garbrandt for the UFC Flyweight Championship at the same event. He lost the fight via guillotine choke submission in round one.

Perez was scheduled to meet Matt Schnell on May 15, 2021, at UFC 262. However, for undisclosed reasons Perez was forced to pull out from the event and was replaced by Rogério Bontorin.

Perez was scheduled to face Askar Askarov on July 31, 2021, on UFC on ESPN 28. However, Askarov pulled out of the fight in early July citing injury. In turn, Perez was removed from the card entirely and rescheduled to face Matt Schnell four weeks later on August 28, 2021, at UFC on ESPN 30. However, for undisclosed reasons, the bout was moved to UFC Fight Night: Brunson vs. Till. However, the bout was yet again moved for unknown reasons to UFC 269. At the weigh-ins, Alex Perez weighed in at 126.25 pounds, a quarter-pound over the flyweight non-title fight limit. Shortly after the weigh-ins, officials had announced that the bout had been canceled due to Schnell withdrawing from the event because of a medical issue. The pair was rescheduled to UFC 271 on February 12, 2022. At weigh-ins, Perez came in at 128 pounds and did not attempt to try again, resulting in Matt Schnell refusing to accept the catchweight bout and the fight being canceled.

Perez faced Alexandre Pantoja on July 30, 2022, at UFC 277. He lost the fight via a neck crank submission early in the first round.

Perez was scheduled to face Amir Albazi on December 17, 2022, at UFC Fight Night 216. However, he pulled out due to undisclosed reasons in late October and was replaced by Brandon Royval.

Perez was scheduled to face Kai Kara-France on February 12, 2023, at UFC 284. However, Kara-France withdrew from the fight, citing a knee injury and the bout was canceled.

Perez was scheduled to face Manel Kape on March 25, 2023, at UFC on ESPN 43. However, the pairing was cancelled during the broadcast as Perez suffered an undisclosed medical issue.

Perez faced Muhammad Mokaev on March 2, 2024, at UFC Fight Night 238. After being taken down a number of times, Perez lost the bout by unanimous decision.

Perez faced Matheus Nicolau, as a replacement for Manel Kape, on April 27, 2024, at UFC on ESPN 55. Perez won the fight by knockout in the second round. This fight earned him another Performance of the Night award.

Perez was scheduled to face Tagir Ulanbekov on June 15, 2024, at UFC on ESPN 58. However, the bout was changed and Perez ended up headlining the main event against Tatsuro Taira. Perez lost the fight by technical knockout as a result of a knee injury in the second round.

Perez was scheduled to face former UFC Flyweight Championship challenger Steve Erceg on August 9, 2025, at UFC on ESPN 72. However, Perez pulled out in mid-July due to undisclosed reasons, so the bout was scrapped.

Perez faced Asu Almabayev on November 22, 2025, at UFC Fight Night 265. He lost the fight via a guillotine choke submission in the third round.

Perez faced Charles Johnson on January 24, 2026, at UFC 324. Perez weighed in at 128.5 pounds, two and a half pounds over the flyweight non-title fight limit. As a result, the bout proceeded at catchweight, and Perez was fined 25 percent of his purse, which was awarded to Johnson. He won the fight via technical knockout in round one.

Perez faced Su Mudaerji on May 30, 2026 at UFC Fight Night 277. The bout was ruled a no contest midway through the second round due to an accidental low blow by Mudaerji that left Perez unable to continue.

The rematch with Mudaerji took place on August 30, 2026 at UFC Fight Night 286. He lost the fight by unanimous decision.

== Professional grappling career ==
Perez was booked to compete against two-time NCAA champion wrestler Roman Bravo-Young in a Brazilian jiu-jitsu match at UFC Fight Pass Invitational 4 on June 29, 2023. The match ended in a draw.

== Personal life ==
Alex and his wife have a son (born 2021).

== Championships and accomplishments ==
=== Mixed martial arts ===
- Ultimate Fighting Championship
  - Performance of the Night (Three times) vs. Jordan Espinosa, Jussier Formiga and Matheus Nicolau
  - Tied (Deiveson Figueiredo, John Lineker, Dustin Ortiz & Joshua Van) for third most knockouts in UFC Flyweight division history (4)
  - Second shortest average fight time in UFC Flyweight division history (6:25)
  - Third most knockdowns-per-15 minutes in UFC Flyweight division history (1.17)
- Tachi Palace Fights
  - TPC Flyweight Champion (One time; former)

== Mixed martial arts record ==
Professional record breakdown
38 matches	26 wins	11 losses
By knockout	7	2
By submission	7	6
By decision	12	3
No contests	1	

Res.	Record	Opponent	Method	Event	Date	Round	Time	Location	Notes
Loss	26–11 (1)	Su Mudaerji	Decision (unanimous)	UFC Fight Night: Nurmagomedov vs. Song	August 29, 2026	3	5:00	Shanghai, China	
NC	26–10 (1)	Su Mudaerji	NC (accidental groin kick)	UFC Fight Night: Song vs. Figueiredo	May 30, 2026	2	1:45	Macau SAR, China	Accidental groin kick rendered Perez unable to continue.
Win	26–10	Charles Johnson	TKO (punch)	UFC 324	January 24, 2026	1	3:16	Las Vegas, Nevada, United States	Catchweight (128.5 lb) bout; Perez missed weight.
Loss	25–10	Asu Almabayev	Submission (flying guillotine choke)	UFC Fight Night: Tsarukyan vs. Hooker	November 22, 2025	3	0:22	Al Rayyan, Qatar	
Loss	25–9	Tatsuro Taira	TKO (knee injury)	UFC on ESPN: Perez vs. Taira	June 15, 2024	2	2:59	Las Vegas, Nevada, United States	
Win	25–8	Matheus Nicolau	KO (punch)	UFC on ESPN: Nicolau vs. Perez	April 27, 2024	2	2:16	Las Vegas, Nevada, United States	Performance of the Night.
Loss	24–8	Muhammad Mokaev	Decision (unanimous)	UFC Fight Night: Rozenstruik vs. Gaziev	March 2, 2024	3	5:00	Las Vegas, Nevada, United States	
Loss	24–7	Alexandre Pantoja	Submission (neck crank)	UFC 277	July 30, 2022	1	1:31	Dallas, Texas, United States	
Loss	24–6	Deiveson Figueiredo	Submission (guillotine choke)	UFC 255	November 21, 2020	1	1:57	Las Vegas, Nevada, United States	For the UFC Flyweight Championship.
Win	24–5	Jussier Formiga	TKO (leg kicks)	UFC 250	June 6, 2020	1	4:06	Las Vegas, Nevada, United States	Performance of the Night.
Win	23–5	Jordan Espinosa	Technical Submission (arm-triangle choke)	UFC Fight Night: Blaydes vs. dos Santos	January 25, 2020	1	2:33	Raleigh, North Carolina, United States	Performance of the Night.
Win	22–5	Mark De La Rosa	Decision (unanimous)	UFC on ESPN: Barboza vs. Gaethje	March 30, 2019	3	5:00	Philadelphia, Pennsylvania, United States	Bantamweight bout.
Loss	21–5	Joseph Benavidez	TKO (punches)	The Ultimate Fighter: Heavy Hitters Finale	November 30, 2018	1	4:21	Las Vegas, Nevada, United States	
Win	21–4	Jose Torres	KO (punches)	UFC 227	August 9, 2018	1	3:34	Los Angeles, California, United States	
Win	20–4	Eric Shelton	Decision (unanimous)	UFC on Fox: Emmett vs. Stephens	February 24, 2018	3	5:00	Orlando, Florida, United States	Catchweight (126.5 lb) bout; Perez missed weight.
Win	19–4	Carls John de Tomas	Submission (anaconda choke)	UFC Fight Night: Swanson vs. Ortega	December 9, 2017	2	1:54	Fresno, California, United States	Bantamweight bout.
Win	18–4	Kevin Gray	Technical Submission (anaconda choke)	Dana White's Contender Series 5	August 8, 2017	1	2:54	Las Vegas, Nevada, United States	Return to Flyweight.
Win	17–4	Tyler Bialecki	Decision (unanimous)	Cage Fury FC 64	March 25, 2017	3	5:00	San Diego, California, United States	
Win	16–4	Andrew Natividad	Submission (anaconda choke)	Tachi Palace Fights 30	February 2, 2017	1	2:27	Lemoore, California, United States	Return to Bantamweight.
Win	15–4	Ralph Acosta	Decision (unanimous)	KOTC: Warranted Aggression	December 18, 2016	3	5:00	Ontario, California, United States	Catchweight (130 lb) bout; Perez missed weight (131.4 lb).
Win	14–4	Ray Elizalde	Decision (split)	RFA 42	August 19, 2016	3	5:00	Visalia, California, United States	
Loss	13–4	Jared Papazian	Submission (armbar)	Tachi Palace Fights 27	May 19, 2016	1	3:26	Lemoore, California, United States	Catchweight (130 lb) bout.
Loss	13–3	Adam Antolin	Submission (guillotine choke)	Tachi Palace Fights 25	November 19, 2015	1	1:15	Lemoore, California, United States	Lost the TPF Flyweight Championship.
Win	13–2	Martin Sandoval	Decision (unanimous)	Tachi Palace Fights 24	August 6, 2015	3	5:00	Lemoore, California, United States	Catchweight (127.2 lb) bout; Perez missed weight.
Win	12–2	Anthony Figueroa	Decision (unanimous)	Tachi Palace Fights 22	February 5, 2015	5	5:00	Lemoore, California, United States	Won the vacant TPF Flyweight Championship.
Win	11–2	Del Hawkins	TKO (punches)	Tachi Palace Fights 19	June 19, 2014	1	2:23	Lemoore, California, United States	Bantamweight bout.
Win	10–2	Eloy Garza	Decision (unanimous)	Tachi Palace Fights 18	February 6, 2014	3	5:00	Lemoore, California, United States	
Win	9–2	Jeff Carson	Submission (standing guillotine)	Tachi Palace Fights 16	August 22, 2013	1	2:23	Lemoore, California, United States	
Win	8–2	Peter Baltimore	Decision (unanimous)	MEZ Sports: Pandemonium 8	March 23, 2013	3	5:00	Pomona, California, United States	
Win	7–2	Carlos DeSoto	TKO (punches)	Tachi Palace Fights 15	November 15, 2012	1	1:52	Lemoore, California, United States	Bantamweight bout; Perez missed weight (138.8 lb).
Win	6–2	Javier Galas	Submission (rear-naked choke)	Tachi Palace Fights 14	September 7, 2012	1	1:37	Lemoore, California, United States	Catchweight (139 lb) bout.
Win	5–2	Edgar Diaz	Submission (kimura)	Tachi Palace Fights 12	March 9, 2012	1	2:33	Lemoore, California, United States	Catchweight (130.2 lb) bout; Perez missed weight.
Win	4–2	Kevin Michel	Decision (unanimous)	California Fight Syndicate: Rivalry	January 28, 2012	3	5:00	Santa Monica, California, United States	
Loss	3–2	John MaCalolooy	Decision (unanimous)	West Coast FC 1	January 7, 2012	3	5:00	Placerville, California, United States	
Loss	3–1	Edgar Diaz	Submission (guillotine choke)	Tachi Palace Fights 11	December 2, 2011	1	0:43	Lemoore, California, United States	Flyweight debut.
Win	3–0	Sam Stevens-Milo	Decision (unanimous)	Up and Comers Unlimited 6	September 10, 2011	3	5:00	Turlock, California, United States	
Win	2–0	Ruben Trujillo	Decision (unanimous)	Up and Comers Unlimited 4	Jun 24, 2011	3	5:00	Madera, California, United States	
Win	1–0	Jesus Castro	TKO (punches)	Tachi Palace Fights 9	May 6, 2011	1	1:56	Lemoore, California, United States	Bantamweight debut.

== Pay-per-view bouts ==
No	Event	Fight	Date	Venue	City	PPV buys
1.	UFC 255	Figueiredo vs. Perez	November 21, 2020	UFC Apex	Enterprise, Nevada, United States	Not Disclosed

== See also ==
- List of current UFC fighters
- List of Dana White's Contender Series alumni
- List of male mixed martial artists
