= UFC Fight Night: Edwards vs. Muhammad =

Mixed martial arts event in 2021

- The poster for UFC Fight Night: Edwards vs. Muhammad
- Promotion: Ultimate Fighting Championship
- Date: March 13, 2021
- Venue: UFC Apex
- City: Enterprise, Nevada, United States
- Attendance: None (behind closed doors)

Event chronology
UFC 259: Błachowicz vs. Adesanya	UFC Fight Night: Edwards vs. Muhammad	UFC on ESPN: Brunson vs. Holland

UFC Fight Night: Edwards vs. Muhammad (also known as UFC Fight Night 187, UFC on ESPN+ 45 and UFC Vegas 21) was a mixed martial arts event produced by the Ultimate Fighting Championship that took place on March 13, 2021 at the UFC Apex facility in Enterprise, Nevada, part of the Las Vegas Metropolitan Area, United States.

== Background ==
A welterweight bout between Leon Edwards and Khamzat Chimaev was expected to serve as the main event. The pairing has been scheduled as headliner and cancelled on two previous occasions due to COVID-19 related issues affecting both fighters. First at UFC Fight Night: Thompson vs. Neal in December 2020, and again at UFC on ESPN: Chiesa vs. Magny in January 2021. On February 11, the fight was cancelled a third time as it was announced that Chimaev was still suffering from lingering effects of COVID-19 and pulled out of the fight. Edwards faced Belal Muhammad instead.

A bantamweight bout between Irwin Rivera and Ray Rodriguez was scheduled for the event. However, on January 7, news surfaced that Rivera was arrested for two counts of attempted murder in Palm Beach County, Florida after he allegedly stabbed his two sisters. He is currently being held in the Palm Beach County jail without bail. He was replaced by Rani Yahya.

Tagir Ulanbekov and returning veteran Matheus Nicolau were expected to meet in a flyweight bout at UFC 257, but Ulanbekov withdrew in late December due to undisclosed reasons. The pairing was eventually rescheduled for this event. However, Ulanbekov pulled out once again and was replaced by former Rizin FF Bantamweight Champion Manel Kape.

A heavyweight bout between Jairzinho Rozenstruik and Ciryl Gane was originally scheduled for this event. However, they were moved to headline UFC Fight Night: Rozenstruik vs. Gane after the original main event between former UFC Light Heavyweight Championship challenger Dominick Reyes and former Rizin Light Heavyweight Champion Jiří Procházka was cancelled due to undisclosed reasons.

Guram Kutateladze was expected to face Don Madge in a lightweight bout at the event. However, Kutateladze pulled out in early February due to a knee injury. He was replaced by Nasrat Haqparast. In turn, Madge pulled out on March 6 due to visa issues. Haqparast eventually faced promotional newcomer Rafa García.

The Ultimate Fighter: Team McGregor vs. Team Faber lightweight winner Ryan Hall was expected to face Dan Ige in a featherweight bout at the event. However, Hall pulled out of the fight on February 11 due to undisclosed reasons. Ige faced Gavin Tucker instead.

Misha Cirkunov was expected to face Ryan Spann in a light heavyweight bout at UFC Fight Night: Thompson vs. Neal. However, Cirkunov pulled out due to an injury. The fight took place at this event.

Charles Jourdain was expected to face Steve Garcia in a featherweight bout at the event. However, Garcia withdrew from the fight for unknown reasons and was replaced by Marcelo Rojo.

A women's strawweight rematch between former Invicta FC Strawweight Champion Angela Hill and Ashley Yoder was expected to take place at UFC Fight Night: Rozenstruik vs. Gane. The two met before at The Ultimate Fighter: Redemption Finale in July 2017, with Hill winning via unanimous decision. Their second meeting was postponed on the day of that event, as it was announced that one of Yoder's cornermen tested positive for COVID-19. The bout took place at this card.

A featherweight bout between Ricardo Ramos and Zubaira Tukhugov was expected to take place during the preliminary portion of the event. A week before the event, Tukhugov pulled out due to undisclosed reasons. Promotion officials elected to remove Ramos from the card entirely and he will be rescheduled for a future event.

A heavyweight bout between Ben Rothwell and Philipe Lins was expected to take place at the event. However, during the week leading up to the event the bout was removed from the card due to undisclosed reasons. The pairing is expected to remain intact and rescheduled for UFC on ESPN: Rodriguez vs. Waterson.

== Results ==
Main card (ESPN+)
Weight class				Method	Round	Time	Notes
Welterweight	Leon Edwards	vs.	Belal Muhammad	No Contest (accidental eye poke)	2	0:18	(Note: Accidental eye poke rendered Muhammad unable to continue.)
Light Heavyweight	Ryan Spann	def.	Misha Cirkunov	TKO (punches)	1	1:11
Featherweight	Dan Ige	def.	Gavin Tucker	KO (punch)	1	0:22
Bantamweight	Davey Grant	def.	Jonathan Martinez	KO (punch)	2	3:03
Flyweight	Matheus Nicolau	def.	Manel Kape	Decision (split) (28–29, 29–28, 29–28)	3	5:00
Middleweight	Eryk Anders	vs.	Darren Stewart	No Contest (illegal knee)	1	4:37	(Note: Accidental illegal knee rendered Stewart unable to continue.)
Preliminary card (ESPN+)
Women’s Strawweight	Angela Hill	def.	Ashley Yoder	Decision (unanimous) (30–27, 30–27, 30–27)	3	5:00
Featherweight	Charles Jourdain	def.	Marcelo Rojo	TKO (punches)	3	4:31
Bantamweight	Rani Yahya	def.	Ray Rodriguez	Submission (arm-triangle choke)	2	3:09
Lightweight	Nasrat Haqparast	def.	Rafa García	Decision (unanimous) (30–27, 29–28, 29–28)	3	5:00
Women’s Flyweight	JJ Aldrich	def.	Cortney Casey	Decision (split) (28–29, 29–28, 29–28)	3	5:00
Women’s Strawweight	Jinh Yu Frey	def.	Gloria de Paula	Decision (unanimous) (29–28, 29–28, 29–28)	3	5:00
Welterweight	Matthew Semelsberger	def.	Jason Witt	KO (punch)	1	0:16

== Bonus awards ==
The following fighters received $50,000 bonuses.

- Fight of the Night: No bonus awarded.
- Performance of the Night: Ryan Spann, Dan Ige, Davey Grant and Matthew Semelsberger

== See also ==
- List of UFC events
- List of current UFC fighters
- 2021 in UFC
