= Terrance McKinney =

American mixed martial artist (born 1994)

- Born: Terrance Kitarius McKinney; September 15, 1994 (age 32); Spokane, Washington, U.S.
- Other names: T Wrecks
- Height: 5 ft 10 in (1.78 m)
- Weight: 155 lb (70 kg; 11 st 1 lb)
- Division: Lightweight (2021–present); Featherweight (2017–2019)
- Reach: 73 in (185 cm)
- Fighting out of: Spokane, Washington, U.S.
- Team: Warrior Camp MMA
- Rank: Purple belt in Brazilian Jiu-Jitsu under Pablo Alfonso
- Wrestling: NCAA Division II Wrestling
- Years active: 2017–present

Mixed martial arts record
- Total: 28
- Wins: 19
- By knockout: 10
- By submission: 9
- Losses: 9
- By knockout: 6
- By submission: 3

Other information
- Mixed martial arts record from Sherdog

Terrance Kitarius McKinney (born September 15, 1994) is an American professional mixed martial artist who currently competes in the lightweight division of the Ultimate Fighting Championship (UFC). A professional since 2017, McKinney also competed for Legacy Fighting Alliance (LFA).

== Background ==
McKinney was born to and raised by his mother Kitara Johnson, a former gang member. McKinney and his family moved to a military base in Germany, where he was picked on due to being small, and after relocating to Davenport, Washington once his mother joined the US Army, he was picked on for being black. McKinney eventually ended up at Spokane, Washington in 2007, where he took up wrestling.

During his high school years, McKinney was a standout high school wrestler, becoming a two-time WIAA state champion out of Shadle Park High School and a Fargo All-American in freestyle. The sixth-ranked senior recruit in the country, McKinney considered skipping college wrestling to jump into MMA, a sport he had decided to pursue as a freshman, but went on to wrestle at North Idaho College, where he went 31–11 and was the top-ranked athlete during his first year in junior college ('13–'14). After a quick stint at NIC, he transferred to Chadron State College and redshirted during '14–'15.

During the summer of 2015, McKinney was extremely intoxicated after abusing LSD, psilocybin mushrooms and alcohol, and the friends he was partying with called the police and left the scene. Once police found him covered in blood (after cutting his neck with glass) and experiencing excited delirium, McKinney was transported to the hospital. In the ambulance, his heart beat stopped and died twice, though he was resuscitated twice as well. In return to the police officers who saved his life, McKinney served as a leader for the Youth Police Initiative. Referring to the incident years later, McKinney expressed:

“I was so embarrassed, to be honest, I was really disappointed in myself. Just seeing my mom’s face in tears. She could have lost me forever, and I’m her first born. That was a huge game changer for me. Seeing my family members crying and sad. Just seeing that inspired me to make a change. I tried to be around them every day, and I still feel they’re hurt. That pushes me to be the man I am today.”

McKinney was not kicked off the wrestling team and went on to be ranked as high as second in the nation in the NCAA Division II level during the 2015–16 season, before transferring to Notre Dame College and dropping out after one semester in order to pursue mixed martial arts.

== Mixed martial arts career ==
=== Early career ===
After ending his college wrestling career, McKinney made his amateur mixed martial arts debut in August 2016, winning by knockout fifteen seconds into the first round. A year later, he would turn professional, and went on to compile a 7–1 record before appearing on Dana White's Contender Series 21 in July 2019, losing by knockout to Sean Woodson. After also losing his next fight to Darrick Minner, McKinney took time off and came back in early 2021 in the lightweight division, racking up three knockouts in a row (two in the LFA) with a combined octagon time of less than two minutes in a span of four months, before signing with the Ultimate Fighting Championship.

=== Ultimate Fighting Championship ===
Eight days after a first round knockout win in the headliner of LFA 109, McKinney made his promotional debut against Matt Frevola on June 12, 2021, at UFC 263, replacing an injured Frank Camacho. He won the fight by knockout seven seconds into the first round, setting the record for the fastest finish in UFC lightweight history. After the event, UFC president Dana White announced that even though McKinney did not receive an official Performance of the Night bonus, he would receive an unofficial one.

On February 26, 2022, McKinney faced Farès Ziam at UFC Fight Night 202, earning a victory via rear-naked choke in the first.

In a fourteen-day turnaround, McKinney stepped in short notice to take on Drew Dober on March 12, at UFC Fight Night 203, replacing an injured Ricky Glenn. McKinney knocked down Dober twice within the opening minute, but ultimately lost the fight via technical knockout in round one.

McKinney faced Erick Gonzalez on August 6, 2022, at UFC on ESPN 40. He won the fight via a rear-naked choke submission in round one.

McKinney faced Ismael Bonfim on January 21, 2023, at UFC 283. He lost the fight via a flying knee knockout in the second round.

McKinney next faced Nazim Sadykhov at UFC on ESPN 49 on July 15, 2023, losing the fight via a rear-naked choke submission in the second round.

Replacing Lando Vannata, McKinney took a short notice fight with Mike Breeden on August 12, 2023, at UFC on ESPN 51. He won the fight via technical knockout in round one.

McKinney was scheduled to face Chris Duncan on October 14, 2023, at UFC Fight Night 230. However, Duncan withdrew due to visa issues, and was replaced by promotional newcomer Brendon Marotte. McKinney won the fight via technical knockout just twenty seconds into the bout.

McKinney faced Esteban Ribovics on May 11, 2024, at UFC on ESPN 56. He lost the fight early in the first round by knockout via a head kick.

McKinney was scheduled to face an opponent to-be-announced on October 12, 2024 at UFC Fight Night 244. However, his name was removed from the card for unknown reasons.

McKinney faced Damir Hadžović on February 1, 2025 at UFC Fight Night 250. He won the fight by technical knockout via ground-and-pound in the first round.

McKinney faced Viacheslav Borshchev on June 28, 2025 at UFC 317. He won the fight via a guillotine choke submission within the first minute of the first round.

McKinney faced Chris Duncan on December 6, 2025, at UFC 323. He lost the fight via an anaconda choke submission in the first round.

McKinney faced Kyle Nelson on March 28, 2026 at UFC Fight Night 271. He won the fight via technical knockout 24 seconds into the first round.

McKinney faced King Green on July 11, 2026 at UFC 329. He lost the fight by technical knockout with one second remaining in the first round.

McKinney faced Jim Miller on November 14, 2026 at UFC 334. At the weigh-ins, McKinney weighed in at 160.2 pounds, 4.2 pounds over the lightweight non-title fight limit. The fight proceeded at catchweight and McKinney was fined 30 percent of his individual purse which went to Miller. McKinney won the fight by knockout in the first round.

== Professional grappling career ==
McKinney competed against Sidney Outlaw in a grappling match at ADXC 2 on January 19, 2024. He lost the match by submission in the first round.

== Championships and accomplishments ==
- Ultimate Fighting Championship
  - Fastest finish in UFC Lightweight division history (0:07 vs. Matt Frevola)
  - Fastest knockout in UFC Lightweight division history (0:07 vs. Matt Frevola)
    - Fastest debut in UFC history (0:07 vs. Matt Frevola)
  - Tied (Vitor Belfort) for second most sub-minute finishes in UFC history (4) (behind Anthony Johnson)
    - Tied (Michał Oleksiejczuk, Francis Ngannou, Joe Lauzon and Donald Cerrone) for sixth most first-round finishes in UFC history (8)
    - Second most first-round finishes in UFC Lightweight division history (9) (behind Jim Miller)
  - Highest striking differential in UFC Lightweight division history (3.11)
  - Second most significant strikes landed-per-minute in UFC Lightweight division history (8.06)
  - Shortest average fight time in UFC Lightweight division history (2:25)
    - Third shortest average fight time in UFC history (2:28)
  - Fourth most knockdowns landed per fifteen minutes in UFC Lightweight division history (1.65)
  - UFC Honors Awards
    - 2021: Fan's Choice Debut of the Year Nominee vs. Matt Frevola
  - UFC.com Awards
    - 2021: Ranked #7 Newcomer of the Year Ranked #7 Knockout of the Year vs. Matt Frevola & Ranked #4 Upset of the Year vs. Matt Frevola
- Front Street Fights
  - FSF Lightweight Championship (one time)
- Sherdog
  - 2022 Round of the Year vs. Drew Dober
- MMA Fighting
  - 2022 Second Team MMA All-Star

== Mixed martial arts record ==
Professional record breakdown
| 28 matches | 19 wins | 9 losses |
| By knockout | 10 | 6 |
| By submission | 9 | 3 |

| Res. | Record | Opponent | Method | Event | Date | Round | Time | Location | Notes |
|---|---|---|---|---|---|---|---|---|---|
| Win | 19–9 | Jim Miller | TKO (punches) | UFC 334 | November 14, 2026 | 1 | 1:53 | New York City, New York, United States | Catchweight (160.2 lb) bout; McKinney missed weight. |
| Loss | 18–9 | King Green | TKO (punches) | UFC 329 | July 11, 2026 | 1 | 4:59 | Las Vegas, Nevada, United States | |
| Win | 18–8 | Kyle Nelson | TKO (head kick and punches) | UFC Fight Night: Adesanya vs. Pyfer | March 28, 2026 | 1 | 0:24 | Seattle, Washington, United States | |
| Loss | 17–8 | Chris Duncan | Submission (anaconda choke) | UFC 323 | December 6, 2025 | 1 | 2:30 | Las Vegas, Nevada, United States | |
| Win | 17–7 | Viacheslav Borshchev | Submission (guillotine choke) | UFC 317 | June 28, 2025 | 1 | 0:55 | Las Vegas, Nevada, United States | |
| Win | 16–7 | Damir Hadžović | TKO (punches) | UFC Fight Night: Adesanya vs. Imavov | February 1, 2025 | 1 | 2:01 | Riyadh, Saudi Arabia | |
| Loss | 15–7 | Esteban Ribovics | KO (head kick) | UFC on ESPN: Lewis vs. Nascimento | May 11, 2024 | 1 | 0:37 | St. Louis, Missouri, United States | |
| Win | 15–6 | Brendan Marotte | TKO (knee and punches) | UFC Fight Night: Yusuff vs. Barboza | October 14, 2023 | 1 | 0:20 | Las Vegas, Nevada, United States | |
| Win | 14–6 | Mike Breeden | TKO (punches) | UFC on ESPN: Luque vs. dos Anjos | August 12, 2023 | 1 | 1:25 | Las Vegas, Nevada, United States | |
| Loss | 13–6 | Nazim Sadykhov | Submission (rear-naked choke) | UFC on ESPN: Holm vs. Bueno Silva | July 15, 2023 | 2 | 1:07 | Las Vegas, Nevada, United States | |
| Loss | 13–5 | Ismael Bonfim | KO (flying knee) | UFC 283 | January 21, 2023 | 2 | 2:17 | Rio de Janeiro, Brazil | |
| Win | 13–4 | Erick Gonzalez | Submission (rear-naked choke) | UFC on ESPN: Santos vs. Hill | August 6, 2022 | 1 | 2:17 | Las Vegas, Nevada, United States | |
| Loss | 12–4 | Drew Dober | TKO (knee and punches) | UFC Fight Night: Santos vs. Ankalaev | March 12, 2022 | 1 | 3:17 | Las Vegas, Nevada, United States | |
| Win | 12–3 | Farès Ziam | Submission (rear-naked choke) | UFC Fight Night: Makhachev vs. Green | February 26, 2022 | 1 | 2:11 | Las Vegas, Nevada, United States | |
| Win | 11–3 | Matt Frevola | KO (punches) | UFC 263 | June 12, 2021 | 1 | 0:07 | Glendale, Arizona, United States | |
| Win | 10–3 | Michael Irizarry Ortiz | KO (punches) | LFA 109 | June 4, 2021 | 1 | 1:12 | Shawnee, Oklahoma, United States | Catchweight (160 lb) bout. |
| Win | 9–3 | Toninho Gavinho | KO (head kick) | LFA 106 | April 30, 2021 | 1 | 0:17 | Shawnee, Oklahoma, United States | |
| Win | 8–3 | Dedrek Sanders | TKO (punches) | Strike Hard Productions 59 | March 6, 2021 | 1 | 0:16 | Chattanooga, Tennessee, United States | Return to Lightweight; McKinney missed weight (156.7 lb). |
| Loss | 7–3 | Darrick Minner | Submission (triangle choke) | Midwest CF 18 | October 19, 2019 | 1 | 0:57 | North Platte, Nebraska, United States | |
| Loss | 7–2 | Sean Woodson | KO (flying knee) | Dana White's Contender Series 21 | July 23, 2019 | 2 | 1:49 | Las Vegas, Nevada, United States | |
| Win | 7–1 | Charon Spain | Submission (rear-naked choke) | ExciteFight: Conquest of the Cage 31 | May 18, 2019 | 1 | 0:43 | Airway Heights, Washington, United States | Return to Featherweight. |
| Win | 6–1 | Bobby McIntyre | Submission (rear-naked choke) | Front Street Fights 19 | April 19, 2019 | 1 | 2:57 | Boise, Idaho, United States | Won the FSF Lightweight Championship. |
| Win | 5–1 | Jeff Coleman | TKO (punches) | ExciteFight: Conquest of the Cage 30 | February 8, 2019 | 1 | 0:07 | Airway Heights, Washington, United States | Welterweight debut. |
| Loss | 4–1 | Tyrone Henderson | TKO (leg injury) | CageSport 52 | July 21, 2018 | 1 | 0:39 | Tacoma, Washington, United States | Featherweight bout. |
| Win | 4–0 | Brandon Todd | Submission (kneebar) | CageSport 50 | April 28, 2018 | 3 | 0:43 | Tacoma, Washington, United States | Lightweight debut. |
| Win | 3–0 | Tyrone Henderson | Submission (armbar) | CageSport 49 | February 10, 2018 | 1 | 1:39 | Tacoma, Washington, United States | |
| Win | 2–0 | Armando Best | Submission (rear-naked choke) | CageSport 48 | December 16, 2017 | 1 | 1:23 | Tacoma, Washington, United States | |
| Win | 1–0 | Armando Best | Submission (rear-naked choke) | CageSport 47 | October 14, 2017 | 1 | 2:15 | Tacoma, Washington, United States | Featherweight debut. |

== See also ==
- List of current UFC fighters
- List of Dana White's Contender Series alumni
- List of male mixed martial artists
