= UFC 263 =

2021 MMA event

UFC 263: Adesanya vs. Vettori 2
- The poster for UFC 263: Adesanya vs. Vettori 2
- Promotion: Ultimate Fighting Championship
- Date: June 12, 2021
- Venue: Gila River Arena
- City: Glendale, Arizona, United States
- Attendance: 17,208
- Total gate: $4,200,000
- Buyrate: 600,000

Event chronology
UFC Fight Night: Rozenstruik vs. Sakai	UFC 263: Adesanya vs. Vettori 2	UFC on ESPN: The Korean Zombie vs. Ige

UFC 263: Adesanya vs. Vettori 2 was a mixed martial arts event produced by the Ultimate Fighting Championship that took place on June 12, 2021, at the Gila River Arena in Glendale, Arizona, United States.

== Background ==
The event was the second that the promotion has contested in Glendale, following UFC on Fox: Poirier vs. Gaethje in April 2018. Zuffa had previously hosted the final World Extreme Cagefighting event, WEC 53, at the arena in December 2010.

A UFC Middleweight Championship bout between then champion Israel Adesanya and Marvin Vettori headlined the event. The pair previously met at UFC on Fox: Poirier vs. Gaethje, where Adesanya won via split decision.

A UFC Flyweight Championship rematch between champion Deiveson Figueiredo and former title challenger Brandon Moreno took place as the co-main event. The pairing previously met in December 2020 at UFC 256, where Figueiredo retained the title after the bout was scored a majority draw.

A light heavyweight bout between Paul Craig and Jamahal Hill took place at the event. The pairing was previously scheduled to take place at UFC on ESPN: Brunson vs. Holland, but Hill withdrew from that event on March 10 after testing positive for COVID-19.

A welterweight fight between Leon Edwards and former UFC Lightweight Championship challenger Nate Diaz (also The Ultimate Fighter 5 lightweight winner) was expected to take place at UFC 262. However, Diaz pulled out due to a minor injury in early May and the bout took place at this event. Despite the different date, the pairing retained its original status, marking the first time in UFC history that a non-title bout other than the main event was scheduled for five rounds.

A women's bantamweight bout between Karol Rosa and Sijara Eubanks was scheduled to take place at the event. However, Rosa pulled out of the fight in late-May citing an eye injury. In turn, Eubanks was removed from the card and will face Priscila Cachoeira six weeks later at UFC Fight Night: Sandhagen vs. Dillashaw instead.

A lightweight bout between Frank Camacho and Matt Frevola was originally scheduled to take place at UFC on ESPN: Blaydes vs. Volkov in June 2020, but Frevola was pulled from the fight during the week leading up to the event after teammate and cornerman Billy Quarantillo tested positive for COVID-19. Despite two negative tests, Frevola was removed from the bout in an abundance of caution. They were then rescheduled for this event. In turn, Camacho pulled out of the fight four days before the event after being injured in a car accident. Frevola faced promotional newcomer Terrance McKinney instead.

At the weigh-ins, Steven Peterson weighed in at 148.5 pounds, two and a half pounds over the featherweight non-title fight limit. His bout proceeded at catchweight and he was fined 20% of his purse, which went to his opponent Chase Hooper.

== Results ==
Main card
Weight class				Method	Round	Time	Notes
Middleweight	Israel Adesanya (c)	def.	Marvin Vettori	Decision (unanimous) (50–45, 50–45, 50–45)	5	5:00	(Note: For the UFC Middleweight Championship.)
Flyweight	Brandon Moreno	def.	Deiveson Figueiredo (c)	Submission (rear-naked choke)	3	2:26	(Note: For the UFC Flyweight Championship.)
Welterweight	Leon Edwards	def.	Nate Diaz	Decision (unanimous) (49–46, 49–46, 49–46)	5	5:00
Welterweight	Belal Muhammad	def.	Demian Maia	Decision (unanimous) (30–27, 29–28, 29–28)	3	5:00
Light Heavyweight	Paul Craig	def.	Jamahal Hill	TKO (elbows and punches)	1	1:59
Preliminary card (ESPN / ESPN+)
Lightweight	Brad Riddell	def.	Drew Dober	Decision (unanimous) (29–28, 29–28, 29–28)	3	5:00
Light Heavyweight	Eryk Anders	def.	Darren Stewart	Decision (unanimous) (29–28, 29–27, 29–27)	3	5:00
Women's Flyweight	Lauren Murphy	def.	Joanne Calderwood	Decision (split) (29–28, 28–29, 29–28)	3	5:00
Featherweight	Movsar Evloev	def.	Hakeem Dawodu	Decision (unanimous) (29–27, 29–27, 29–27)	3	5:00
Early preliminary card (ESPN+ / UFC Fight Pass)
Women's Bantamweight	Pannie Kianzad	def.	Alexis Davis	Decision (unanimous) (30–27, 30–27, 29–28)	3	5:00
Lightweight	Terrance McKinney	def.	Matt Frevola	KO (punches)	1	0:07
Catchweight (148.5 lb)	Steven Peterson	def.	Chase Hooper	Decision (unanimous) (30–27, 30–27, 29–28)	3	5:00
Lightweight	Farès Ziam	def.	Luigi Vendramini	Decision (majority) (29–28, 29–28, 28–28)	3	5:00
Heavyweight	Carlos Felipe	def.	Jake Collier	Decision (split) (28–29, 29–28, 29–28)	3	5:00

== Bonus awards ==
The following fighters received $50,000 bonuses.

- Fight of the Night: Brad Riddell vs. Drew Dober
- Performance of the Night: Brandon Moreno and Paul Craig

== Reported payout ==
The following is the reported payout to the fighters as reported by the Arizona Department of Gaming. It does not include sponsor money and also does not include the UFC's traditional "fight night" bonuses. Total disclosed purses for the event was $3,233,000.

- Israel Adesanya: $500,000 (no win bonus) def. Marvin Vettori: $350,000
- Brandon Moreno: $200,000 (includes $100,000 win bonus) def. Deiveson Figueiredo: $210,000
- Leon Edwards: $220,000 (includes $110,000 win bonus) def. Nate Diaz: $250,000
- Belal Muhammad: $160,000 (includes $80,000) def. Demian Maia: $175,000
- Paul Craig: $110,000 (includes $55,000 win bonus) def. Jamahal Hill: $28,000
- Brad Riddell: $80,000 (includes $40,000 win bonus) def. Drew Dober: $87,000
- Eryk Anders: $150,000 (includes $75,000 win bonus) def. Darren Stewart: $45,000
- Lauren Murphy: $140,000 (includes $70,000 win bonus) def. Joanne Calderwood: $51,000
- Movsar Evloev: $72,000 (includes $36,000 win bonus) def. Hakeem Dawodu: $55,000
- Pannie Kinziad: $56,000 (includes $28,000 win bonus) def. Alexis Davis: $43,000
- Terrance McKinney: $24,000 (includes $12,000 win bonus) def. Matt Frevola: $23,000
- Steven Peterson: $46,000 (includes $23,000 win bonus) def. Chase Hooper: $37,000 ¹
- Farès Ziam: $28,000 (includes $14,000 win bonus) def. Luigi Vendramini: $15,000
- Carlos Felipe: $50,000 (includes $25,000 win bonus) def. Jake Collier: $28,000

¹ Although not recognized on the official pay sheet, Steven Peterson was fined 20 percent of his purse ($9,200) for failing to make the required weight for his fight with Chase Hooper. That money was issued to Hooper, an ADOG official confirmed.

== Records set ==
The event broke the record for the most decisions on a single UFC card with 11 (later tied with UFC Fight Night: Sterling vs. Zalal), breaking the five-way tie with UFC 169, UFC Fight Night: Machida vs. Mousasi, UFC Fight Night: Silva vs. Bisping, UFC Fight Night: Werdum vs. Tybura, and UFC on ESPN: dos Anjos vs. Edwards and later UFC Fight Night: Vieira vs. Tate. This event was also the longest UFC event with 3:19:32 of fight time.

== See also ==
- List of UFC events
- List of current UFC fighters
- 2021 in UFC
