= List of UFC records =

Below is a list of records held in the Ultimate Fighting Championship (UFC).

== Fighting ==
=== Most bouts ===
==== Most bouts - All fighters ====
On December 16, 1994, Royce Gracie became the first fighter to reach 10 fights in the UFC.

On July 7, 2007, Tito Ortiz became the first fighter to reach 20 fights in the UFC.

On September 8, 2018, Jim Miller became the first fighter to reach 30 fights in the UFC.

On July 2, 2022, Jim Miller became the first fighter to reach 40 fights in the UFC.

**Bold** - Active UFC fighters

Updated as of November 14, 2026 after UFC 334.

In any bout
	Fighter	Division	Bouts
1	(United States) **Jim Miller**	LW \ WW \ CW	48
2	(Belarus) Andrei Arlovski	HW	42
3	(United States) **Neil Magny**	WW	38
3	(United States) Donald Cerrone	WW \ LW	38
5	(Brazil) **Charles Oliveira**	LW \ FTW \ CW	37
5	(Brazil) **Rafael dos Anjos**	WW \ LW \ CW	37
5	(United States) Clay Guida	LW \ FTW	37
8	(United States) **Jeremy Stephens**	FTW \ LW	36

In title bouts
	Fighter	Division	Wins	Losses	Draws	NC	Total
1	(United States) Jon Jones	HW \ LHW	16	0	0	1	17
2	(United States) Randy Couture	HW \ LHW	9	6	0	0	15
2	(Canada) Georges St-Pierre	MW \ WW	13	2	0	0	15
4	**(Kyrgyzstan) Valentina Shevchenko**	W-FLW \ W-BW	11	2	1	0	14
4	(United States) Demetrious Johnson	FLW \ BW	12	2	0	0	14
6	(Brazil) **Amanda Nunes**	W-BW \ W-FTW	11	2	0	0	13
6	(Brazil) Anderson Silva	MW	11	2	0	0	13
7	**(Nigeria) Israel Adesanya**	MW \ LHW	8	4	0	0	12
7	(Australia) **Alexander Volkanovski**	FTW \ LW	9	3	0	0	12
7	(United States) Matt Hughes	WW	9	3	0	0	12
7	(Brazil) José Aldo	BW \ FTW	8	4	0	0	12

==== Most bouts - By division ====
Updated as of November 14, 2026 after UFC 334.

In any bout
Division	Fighter	Bouts
Heavyweight	(Belarus) Andrei Arlovski	42
Light Heavyweight	(United States) Ovince Saint Preux	26
Middleweight	**(United States) Brad Tavares**	28
Welterweight	(United States) **Neil Magny**	38
Lightweight	(United States) **Jim Miller**	45
Featherweight	(United States) Darren Elkins	29
Bantamweight	(Ecuador) **Marlon Vera**	24
Flyweight	(Mexico) **Brandon Moreno**	21
Women's Featherweight	(Brazil) Norma Dumont	6
Women's Featherweight	(Australia) Megan Anderson	6
Women's Featherweight	(Canada) Felicia Spencer	6
Women's Bantamweight	(United States) **Raquel Pennington**	18
Women's Flyweight	(United States) **Katlyn Cerminara**	15
Women's Strawweight	(United States) **Angela Hill**	29

In title bouts
Division	Fighter	Bouts
Heavyweight	(United States) Tim Sylvia	9
Heavyweight	(United States) Randy Couture	9
Heavyweight	(United States) Stipe Miocic	9
Light Heavyweight	(United States) Jon Jones	15
Middleweight	(Brazil) Anderson Silva	13
Welterweight	(Canada) Georges St-Pierre	14
Lightweight	(United States) B.J. Penn	8
Featherweight	(Brazil) José Aldo	11
Bantamweight	(United States) T.J. Dillashaw	7
Flyweight	(United States) Demetrious Johnson	13
Women's Featherweight	(Brazil) Cris Cyborg	4
Women's Bantamweight	(Brazil) **Amanda Nunes**	10
Women's Flyweight	(Kyrgyzstan) **Valentina Shevchenko**	13
Women's Strawweight	(Poland) Joanna Jędrzejczyk	9

==== Most bouts or wins - In a calendar year ====
	Fighter	Division/s	Year	Bouts (Note: Does not include multiple-bout tournaments)	Wins
1	(United States) Chris Leben	MW	2006	5	3
1	(United States) Roger Huerta	LW	2007	5	**5**
1	(United States) Donald Cerrone	LW	2011	5	4
1	(United States) Daron Cruickshank	LW	2014	5	3
1	(United States) **Neil Magny**	WW	2014	5	**5**
1	(United States) **Neil Magny**	WW	2015	5	4
1	(Jamaica) Uriah Hall	MW	2015	5	3
1	(England) Ross Pearson	LW \ WW	2016	5	1
1	(Brazil) Thiago Santos	MW \ LHW	2018	5	4
1	(United States) Greg Hardy	HW	2019	5	2
1	(United States) **Kevin Holland**	MW \ WW	2020	5	**5**
1	(United States) **Kevin Holland**	MW \ WW	2025	5	2
1	(Portugal) André Fialho	WW	2022	5	2
1	(Brazil) **Jéssica Andrade**	W-SW \ W-FW	2023	5	2
1	(Dominican Republic) **Waldo Cortes-Acosta**	HW	2025	5	4

==== Most bouts in a single event ====
Updated as of July 12, 2025 after UFC on ESPN: Lewis vs. Teixeira.

	Event	Date	Number of bouts
1	UFC 2	March 11, 1994	15
1	UFC on ESPN 14	July 26, 2020	15
1	UFC 259	March 6, 2021	15
1	UFC 283	January 21, 2023	15
1	UFC 286	March 18, 2023	15
1	UFC Fight Night 224	July 22, 2023	15

=== Most total fight time ===
==== Most total fight time - All fighters ====
Updated as of November 15, 2026 after UFC 334.

In any bout
	Fighter	Division/s	Time (hh:mm:ss)
1	(United States) **Max Holloway**	FTW \ LW	8:53:52
2	(Brazil) **Rafael dos Anjos**	LW \ WW	8:43:19
3	(United States) Frankie Edgar	FTW \ LW \ BW	7:57:10
4	(United States) **Jim Miller**	LW \ WW	7:34:50
5	(United States) **Neil Magny**	WW	7:31:09
6	(United States) **Angela Hill**	W-SW	7:12:45

In title bouts
	Fighter	Division	Time (hh:mm:ss)
1	(United States) Jon Jones	LHW \ HW	4:56:20
2	(Kyrgyzstan) **Valentina Shevchenko**	W-FLW \ W-BW	4:48:22
3	(Canada) Georges St-Pierre	WW \ MW	4:14:28
4	(Nigeria) **Israel Adesanya**	MW \ LHW	4:02:32
5	(United States) Demetrious Johnson	FLW \ BW	3:45:57
6	(Australia) **Alexander Volkanovski**	FTW \ LW	3:47:36
7	(Brazil) José Aldo	FTW \ BW	3:44:40

==== Most total fight time - By division ====
Updated as of November 15, 2026 after UFC 334.

In any bout
Division/s	Fighter	Time (hh:mm:ss)
Heavyweight	(Belarus) Andrei Arlovski	6:49:58
Light Heavyweight	(United States) Jon Jones	5:40:15
Middleweight	(United States) **Brad Tavares**	6:04:18
Welterweight	(United States) **Neil Magny**	7:31:09
Lightweight	**(United States) Jim Miller**	7:10:53
Featherweight	**(United States) Max Holloway**	6:58:57
Bantamweight	(Ecuador) **Marlon Vera**	5:21:23
Flyweight	(Mexico) **Brandon Moreno**	5:55:52
Women's Featherweight	(Brazil) Norma Dumont	1:31:26
Women's Bantamweight	(United States) **Raquel Pennington**	4:42:33
Women's Flyweight	(Kyrgyzstan) **Valentina Shevchenko**	4:32:47
Women's Strawweight	(United States) **Angela Hill**	6:57:45

=== Most PPV Main Events ===
	Fighter	Division/s	PPV Main Events	Total
1	(United States) Randy Couture	LHW \ HW	Japan, 28, 31, 34, 36, 39, 43, 44, 46, 49, 52, 57, 68, 74, 91, 102, 105, 109	18
2	(United States) Jon Jones	LHW \ HW	128, 135, 140, 145, 152, 159, 165, 172, 182, 197, 214, 232, 235, 239, 247, 285, 309	17
2	(Brazil) Anderson Silva	MW \ LHW	64, 67, 73, 77, 82, 90, 97, 112, 117, 126, 134, 148 153, 162, 168, 183, 234	17
4	(United States) Tito Ortiz	LHW	13, 19, 22, 25, 29, 30, 32, 33, 40, 44, 47, 50, 51, 66, 106, 133	16
5	(Canada) Georges St-Pierre	WW \ MW	65, 69, 79, 83, 87, 94, 111, 124, 129, 154, 158, 167, 217	13
6	(Nigeria) **Israel Adesanya**	MW \ LHW	234, 243, 248, 253, 259, 263, 271, 276, 281, 287, 293, 305	12

1.Minimum 10 pay-per-view main events.

=== Largest age gap in UFC main event history ===
#	Fighter	Age	Opponent	Age	Event	Age gap
1	(Mexico) **Raul Rosas Jr.**	21y 353d	(Brazil) **Raoni Barcelos**	39y 148d	UFC Fight Night 289	17y 160d
2	(Argentina) **Kevin Vallejos**	24y 96d	(United States) **Josh Emmett**	41y 10d	UFC Fight Night 269	16y 279d
3	(United States) Jon Jones	23y 13d	(Belarus) Vladimir Matyushenko	39y 209d	UFC on Versus 2	16y 196d
4	(Brazil) Gabriel Gonzaga	28y 99d	(United States) Randy Couture	44y 64d	UFC 74	15y 330d
5	(Brazil) Pedro Rizzo	26y 142d	(United States) Dan Severn	42y 106d	UFC 27	15y 329d

== Winning ==
=== Most wins ===
==== Most wins - All fighters ====
**Bold** - Active fighters

Updated as of October 24, 2026 after UFC 333..

In any bout
	Fighter	Division	Wins
1	(United States) **Jim Miller**	LW \ WW \ CW	28
2	(Brazil) **Charles Oliveira**	LW \ FTW	25
2	(United States) **Neil Magny**	WW	25
4	(United States) **Max Holloway**	FTW \ CW \ LW \ WW	24
5	(United States) Donald Cerrone	LW \ WW	23
5	(Belarus) Andrei Arlovski	HW	23
7	(Brazil) Demian Maia	MW \ WW	22
7	(United States) Dustin Poirier	LW \ FTW	22
7	(United States) Jon Jones	HW \ LHW	22

In title bouts
	Fighter	Division	Wins
1	(United States) Jon Jones	HW \ LHW	16
2	(Canada) Georges St-Pierre	MW \ WW	13
3	(United States) Demetrious Johnson	FLW	12
4	(Kyrgyzstan) **Valentina Shevchenko**	W-FLW	11
4	(Brazil) Anderson Silva	MW	11
4	(Brazil) **Amanda Nunes**	W-BW \ W-FTW	11
7	(Australia) **Alexander Volkanovski**	FTW	9
7	(United States) Matt Hughes	WW	9
7	(United States) Randy Couture	LHW \ HW	9

==== Most wins - By division ====
Updated as of October 24, 2026 after UFC 333.

In any bout
Division	Fighter	Wins
Heavyweight	(Belarus) Andrei Arlovski	23
Light Heavyweight	(United States) Jon Jones	20
Middleweight	**(United States) Brad Tavares**	16
Middleweight	(England) Michael Bisping	16
Welterweight	(United States) **Neil Magny**	25
Lightweight	**(United States) Jim Miller**	23
Featherweight	**(United States) Max Holloway**	20
Bantamweight	**(United States) Aljamain Sterling**	14
Bantamweight	(Ecuador) **Marlon Vera**	14
Flyweight	(Brazil) **Alexandre Pantoja**	14
Women's Featherweight	(Brazil) Norma Dumont	5
Women's Bantamweight	(Brazil) **Amanda Nunes**	13
Women's Flyweight	(Kyrgyzstan) **Valentina Shevchenko**	12
Women's Strawweight	(United States) **Angela Hill**	12

In title bouts
Division	Fighter	Wins
Heavyweight	(United States) Stipe Miocic	6 (Note: Not listed in source. Information found in fighter's page.)
Heavyweight	(United States) Randy Couture	6
Light Heavyweight	(United States) Jon Jones	14
Middleweight	(Brazil) Anderson Silva	11
Welterweight	(Canada) Georges St-Pierre	12
Lightweight	**(Russia) Islam Makhachev**	5
Featherweight	**(Australia) Alexander Volkanovski**	9
Bantamweight	(United States) T.J. Dillashaw	5
Flyweight	(United States) Demetrious Johnson	12
Women's Featherweight	(Brazil) **Amanda Nunes**	3
Women's Featherweight	(Brazil) Cris Cyborg	3
Women's Bantamweight	(Brazil) **Amanda Nunes**	8
Women's Flyweight	**(Kyrgyzstan) Valentina Shevchenko**	11
Women's Strawweight	**(China) Zhang Weili**	6
Women's Strawweight	(Poland) Joanna Jedrzejczyk	6

==== Most wins by a woman ====
**Bold** - Active fighters

Updated as of March 14, 2026 after UFC Fight Night: Emmett vs. Vallejos.

In any bout
	Fighter	Division	Wins
1	(Brazil) **Jéssica Andrade**	W-BW \ W-SW \ W-FW	17
2	(Brazil) **Amanda Nunes**	W-BW \ W-FTW	16
3	(Kyrgyzstan) **Valentina Shevchenko**	W-BW \ W-FW	15
4	(Canada) **Gillian Robertson**	W-FW \ W-SW \ CW	14

=== Highest win percentage ===
Win percentage is calculated from UFC bouts only and does not include fights in other promotions.

	Fighter	Division	Wins	Losses	NC	Draw	%
1	(Russia) Khabib Nurmagomedov	LW \ CW	13	0	0	0	100.00
2	**(Russia) Islam Makhachev**	LW \ CW \ WW	18	1	0	0	94.74
3	(Myanmar) **Joshua Van**	FW	11	1	0	0	91.67
3	(United States) Jon Jones	HW \ LHW	22	1	1	0	91.67
5	(New Zealand) **Carlos Ulberg**	LHW	10	1	0	0	90.91
5	(South Africa) **Dricus du Plessis**	MW	10	1	0	0	90.91
5	(Russia) **Movsar Evloev**	FTW \ CW	10	1	0	0	90.91
5	(United States) **Tatiana Suarez**	W-SW \ W-FW	10	1	0	0	90.91
5	(Canada) Georges St-Pierre	MW \ WW	20	2	0	0	90.91
10	(United Arab Emirates) **Khamzat Chimaev**	WW \ MW	9	1	0	0	90.00
10	(Georgia (country)) **Ilia Topuria**	LW \ FTW	9	1	0	0	90.00
10	(Brazil) **Caio Borralho**	MW	9	1	0	0	90.00

- Minimum of 10 UFC fights

=== Most consecutive wins ===
Updated as of October 6, 2026 after UFC 332.

All fighters
	Fighter	Division	Began	Ended	Winning streak
1	(Russia) **Islam Makhachev**	LW \ CW \ WW	Sept 17, 2016	Active	17
2	(Brazil) Anderson Silva	LHW \ MW	Jun 28, 2006	Jul 6, 2013	16
3	(Nigeria) **Kamaru Usman**	WW	Jul 12, 2015	Aug 20, 2022	15
4	(Georgia (country)) **Merab Dvalishvili**	BW	Sept 15, 2018	Dec 6, 2025	14
5	(United States) **Max Holloway**	FTW \ CW	Jan 4, 2014	Apr 13, 2019	13
5	(Canada) Georges St-Pierre	MW \ WW	Aug 25, 2007	Retired	13
5	(United States) Jon Jones	LHW	Mar 21, 2010	Jul 29, 2017	13
5	(United States) Demetrious Johnson	FLW	Jun 8, 2012	Aug 4, 2018	13
5	(Russia) Khabib Nurmagomedov	LW \ CW	Jan 20, 2012	Retired	13
10	(Australia) **Alexander Volkanovski**	FTW \ CW \ LW	Nov 26, 2016	Feb 12, 2023	12
10	(United States) Tony Ferguson	LW	Oct 17, 2013	May 9, 2020	12
10	(Brazil) Amanda Nunes	W-FTW \ W-BW	Mar 21, 2015	Dec 11, 2021	12

By division
Division	Fighter	Began	Ended	Winning streak
Heavyweight	(Brazil) Junior dos Santos	Oct 25, 2008	Dec 29, 2012	9
Light Heavyweight	(United States) Jon Jones	Mar 21, 2010	Jul 29, 2017	13
Middleweight	(Brazil) Anderson Silva	Jun 28, 2006	Jul 6, 2013	13
Welterweight	(Nigeria) **Kamaru Usman**	Jul 12, 2015	Aug 20, 2022	15
Lightweight	(Russia) **Islam Makhachev**	Sept 17, 2016	Active	14
Featherweight	**(United States) Max Holloway**	Jan 4, 2014	Dec 14, 2019	13
Bantamweight	(Georgia (country)) **Merab Dvalishvili**	Sept 15, 2018	Dec 6, 2025	13
Flyweight	(United States) Demetrious Johnson	Jun 8, 2012	Aug 4, 2018	13
Women's Featherweight	(Brazil) Norma Dumont	Nov 28, 2020	Division Defunct	5
Women's Bantamweight	(Brazil) Amanda Nunes	Mar 21, 2015	Dec 11, 2021	9
Women's Flyweight	**(Brazil) Natália Silva**	Jun 18, 2022	Active	9
Women's Flyweight	**(Kyrgyzstan) Valentina Shevchenko**	Feb 3, 2018	Mar 4, 2023	9
Women's Strawweight	(Poland) Joanna Jedrzejczyk	Dec 13, 2014	Nov 4, 2017	8

== Finishes ==
**Bold** - Active fighters

=== Most finishes ===
==== Most finishes - All fighters ====
Updated as of July 11, 2026 after UFC 329.

In any bout
	Fighter	Division	Finishes
1	(Brazil) **Charles Oliveira**	LW \ FTW \ CW	21
2	(United States) **Jim Miller**	WW \ CW \ LW	20
3	(United States) **Derrick Lewis**	HW	16
3	(United States) Donald Cerrone	WW \ LW	16
5	(Brazil) **Vicente Luque**	WW \ MW	15
5	(United States) **Max Holloway**	FTW \ CW \ LW \ WW	15
5	(United States) Matt Brown	WW	15
5	(United States) Dustin Poirier	LW \ FTW \ CW	15
9	(Brazil) Anderson Silva	MW \ LHW	14
9	(Brazil) Vitor Belfort (Note: Not listed in source, information found in fighter's page.)	MW \ LHW \ HW	14

In title bouts
	Fighter	Division	Finishes
1	(Brazil) Anderson Silva	MW	9
2	(United States) Matt Hughes	WW	8
2	(United States) Jon Jones	LHW \ HW	8
4	(United States) Demetrious Johnson	FLW	7
5	(Brazil) **Alex Pereira**	LHW \ MW	6
5	(United States) Ronda Rousey	W-BW	6
5	(Brazil) **Amanda Nunes**	W-BW \ W-FW	6

==== Most finishes - By division ====
Updated as of September 19, 2026 after UFC 331.

In any bout
Division	Fighter	Finishes
Heavyweight	(United States) **Derrick Lewis**	16
Light Heavyweight	(Brazil) Glover Teixeira	13
Middleweight	(United States) Gerald Meerschaert	12
Welterweight	(United States) Matt Brown	15
Lightweight	(United States) **Jim Miller**	18
Featherweight	(United States) **Max Holloway**	11
Bantamweight	(Ecuador) **Marlon Vera**	11
Flyweight	(Brazil) **Alexandre Pantoja**	8
Women's Featherweight	(Australia) Megan Anderson	3
Women's Featherweight	(Canada) Felicia Spencer	3
Women's Bantamweight	(Brazil) **Amanda Nunes**	8
Women's Flyweight	(Canada) **Gillian Robertson**	7
Women's Strawweight	(Brazil) **Jéssica Andrade**	6

In title bouts
Division	Fighter	Finishes
Heavyweight	(United States) Stipe Miocic	4
Light Heavyweight	(United States) Jon Jones	6
Middleweight	(Brazil) Anderson Silva	9
Welterweight	(United States) Matt Hughes	8
Lightweight	(Russia) **Islam Makhachev**	4
Lightweight	(United States) B.J. Penn	4
Featherweight	(United States) **Max Holloway**	4
Bantamweight	(United States) T.J. Dillashaw	5
Flyweight	(United States) Demetrious Johnson	7
Women's Featherweight	(Brazil) Cris Cyborg	2
Women's Featherweight	(Brazil) **Amanda Nunes**	2
Women's Bantamweight	(United States) Ronda Rousey	6
Women's Flyweight	(Kyrgyzstan) **Valentina Shevchenko**	4
Women's Strawweight	(China) **Zhang Weili**	2
Women's Strawweight	(United States) **Rose Namajunas**	2
Women's Strawweight	(Poland) Joanna Jędrzejczyk	2

==== Most consecutive finishes - All fighters ====
Updated as of July 12, 2025 after UFC on ESPN: Lewis vs. Teixeira.

In any bout
	Fighter	Division	Consecutive Finishes
1	(Brazil) Royce Gracie	OW	11
2	(Brazil) Anderson Silva	MW \ LHW	8
3	(Brazil) **Charles Oliveira**	LW	7
3	(United States) Chuck Liddell	LHW	7

==== Most finishes - In a single event ====
	Event	Date	Venue	City	Finishes
1	UFC Fight Night 283	August 1, 2026	Belgrade Arena	Belgrade, Serbia	12
1	UFC Fight Night 291	October 17, 2026	Rogers Place	Edmonton, Alberta, Canada	12
2	UFC Fight Night 55	November 8, 2014	Allphones Arena	Sydney, Australia	11
2	UFC 224	May 12, 2018	Jeunesse Arena	Rio de Janeiro, Brazil	11
2	UFC 281	November 12, 2022	Madison Square Garden	New York City, New York	11
2	UFC Fight Night 258	September 6, 2025	Accor Arena	Paris, France	11
2	UFC 329	July 11, 2026	T-Mobile Arena	Las Vegas, Nevada	11
2	UFC 332	October 3, 2026	Delta Center	Salt Lake City, Utah	11

==== Most first-round finishes - In a single event ====
	Event	Date	Venue	City	1st RD Finishes
1	UFC Fight Night 283	August 1, 2026	Belgrade Arena	Belgrade, Serbia	10
2	UFC 332	October 3, 2026	Delta Center	Salt Lake City, Utah	9
3	UFC 329	July 11, 2026	T-Mobile Arena	Las Vegas, Nevada	8

==== Highest percentage of finishes - In a single event ====
	Event	Date	Venue	City	Fights	Finishes	Finish Percentage
1	UFC Fight Night 55	November 8, 2014	Allphones Arena	Sydney, Australia	11	11	100%
1	UFC Vegas 59	August 6, 2022	UFC Apex	Enterprise, Nevada, U.S.	10	10	100%
1	UFC Freedom 250	June 14, 2026	White House	Washington, DC, U.S.	7	7	100%

=== Fastest finishes ===
==== Fastest finishes - All fighters ====
Updated as of July 12, 2025 after UFC on ESPN: Lewis vs. Teixeira.

In any bout
	Fighter	Opponent	Division	Event	Type of finish	Time
1	(United States) Jorge Masvidal	Ben Askren	WW	UFC 239	Knockout	0:05
2	(United States) Duane Ludwig	Jonathan Goulet	WW	UFC Fight Night 3	Knockout	0:06
3	(United States) Todd Duffee	Tim Hague	HW	UFC 102	Knockout	0:07
3	(South Korea) Chan Sung Jung	Mark Hominick	FTW	UFC 140	Knockout	0:07
3	(Canada) Ryan Jimmo	Anthony Perosh	LHW	UFC 149	Knockout	0:07
3	(United States) **Terrance McKinney**	**Matt Frevola**	LW	UFC 263	Knockout	0:07
7	(United States) Don Frye	Thomas Ramirez	HW	UFC 8	Knockout	0:08
7	(United States) James Irvin	Houston Alexander	LHW	UFC Fight Night 13	Knockout	0:08
7	(England) **Leon Edwards**	Seth Baczynski	WW	UFC Fight Night 64	Knockout	0:08
7	(Finland) Makwan Amirkhani	Andy Ogle	FTW	UFC on Fox 14	Knockout	0:08

In title bouts
	Fighter	Opponent	Championship	Event	Type of finish	Time
1	(Republic of Ireland) **Conor McGregor**	José Aldo	FTW	UFC 194	Knockout	0:13
2	(United States) Ronda Rousey	Cat Zingano	W-BW	UFC 184	Submission	0:14
3	(Belarus) Andrei Arlovski	Paul Buentello	HW	UFC 55	Knockout	0:15
4	(United States) Ronda Rousey	Alexis Davis	W-BW	UFC 175	Knockout	0:16
4	(United States) Frank Shamrock	Kevin Jackson	LHW	UFC 15.5	Submission	0:16

==== Fastest finishes - By division ====
Updated as of December 6, 2025 after UFC 323.

In any bout
Division	Fighter	Opponent	Event	Type of finish	Time
Heavyweight	(United States) Todd Duffee	Tim Hague	UFC 102	Knockout	0:07
Light Heavyweight	(Canada) Ryan Jimmo	Anthony Perosh	UFC 149	Knockout	0:07
Middleweight	(England) Mark Weir	Eugene Jackson	UFC 38	Knockout	0:10
Welterweight	(United States) Jorge Masvidal	Ben Askren	UFC 239	Knockout	0:05
Lightweight	(United States) **Terrance McKinney**	**Matt Frevola**	UFC 263	Knockout	0:07
Featherweight	(South Korea) Chan Sung Jung	Mark Hominick	UFC 140	Knockout	0:07
Bantamweight	(Mexico) Erik Perez	Ken Stone	UFC 150	Knockout	0:17
Flyweight	(United States) Dustin Ortiz	Hector Sandoval	UFC Fight Night 114	Knockout	0:15
Women's Featherweight	(Brazil) **Amanda Nunes**	Cris Cyborg	UFC 232	Knockout	0:51
Women's Bantamweight	(United States) Ronda Rousey	Cat Zingano	UFC 184	Submission	0:14
Women's Flyweight	(Brazil) **Priscila Cachoeira**	Shana Dobson	UFC Fight Night 168	Knockout	0:40
Women's Strawweight	(Brazil) **Denise Gomes**	**Yazmin Jauregui**	UFC 290	Knockout	0:20

In title bouts
Division	Fighter	Opponent	Event	Type of finish	Time
Heavyweight	(Belarus) Andrei Arlovski	Paul Buentello	UFC 55	Knockout	0:15
Light Heavyweight	(United States) Frank Shamrock	Kevin Jackson	UFC 15.5	Submission	0:16
Middleweight	(United States) Rich Franklin	Nate Quarry	UFC 56	Knockout	2:34
Welterweight	(United States) Tyron Woodley	Robbie Lawler	UFC 201	Knockout	2:12
Lightweight	(Brazil) **Rafael dos Anjos**	Donald Cerrone	UFC on Fox 17	Knockout	1:06
Featherweight	(Republic of Ireland) **Conor McGregor**	José Aldo	UFC 194	Knockout	0:13
Bantamweight	(Brazil) Renan Barão	Urijah Faber	UFC 169	Knockout	3:42
Flyweight	(Myanmar) **Joshua Van**	**Alexandre Pantoja**	UFC 323	Knockout	0:26
Women's Featherweight	(Brazil) **Amanda Nunes**	Cris Cyborg	UFC 232	Knockout	0:51
Women's Bantamweight	(United States) Ronda Rousey	Cat Zingano	UFC 184	Submission	0:14
Women's Flyweight	(Kyrgyzstan) **Valentina Shevchenko**	Jessica Eye	UFC 238	Knockout	5:26
Women's Strawweight	(China) **Zhang Weili**	**Jéssica Andrade**	UFC Fight Night 157	Knockout	0:42

=== Latest finishes ===
==== Latest finishes - All fighters ====
In any bout
	Fighter	Opponent	Division	Event	Type of finish	Round	Time
1	(United States) Demetrious Johnson	Kyoji Horiguchi	FLW	UFC 186	Submission	5	4:59
1	(Mexico) **Yair Rodríguez**	Chan Sung Jung	FTW	UFC Fight Night 139	Knockout	5	4:59
1	(United States) **Max Holloway**	**Justin Gaethje**	LW	UFC 300	Knockout	5	4:59
4	(United States) Frankie Edgar	Cub Swanson	FTW	UFC Fight Night 57	Submission	5	4:56
4	(Suriname) Jairzinho Rozenstruik	Alistair Overeem	HW	UFC on ESPN 7	Knockout	5	4:56
6	(Czech Republic) **Jiří Procházka**	Glover Teixeira	LHW	UFC 275	Submission	5	4:32
7	(Nigeria) **Kamaru Usman**	**Colby Covington**	WW	UFC 245	Knockout	5	4:10
8	(England) **Leon Edwards**	**Kamaru Usman**	WW	UFC 278	Knockout	5	4:04

In title bouts
	Fighter	Opponent	Championship	Event	Type of finish	Round	Time
1	(United States) Demetrious Johnson	Kyoji Horiguchi	FLW	UFC 186	Submission	5	4:59
2	(Czech Republic) **Jiří Procházka**	Glover Teixeira	LHW	UFC 275	Submission	5	4:32
3	(Nigeria) **Kamaru Usman**	**Colby Covington**	WW	UFC 245	Knockout	5	4:10
4	(England) **Leon Edwards**	**Kamaru Usman**	WW	UFC 278	Knockout	5	4:04
5	(United States) Demetrious Johnson	John Moraga	FLW	UFC on Fox 8	Submission	5	3:43
6	(United States) **Justin Gaethje**	Tony Ferguson	LW	UFC 249	Knockout	5	3:39
7	(United States) **Miesha Tate**	**Holly Holm**	W-BW	UFC 196	Submission	5	3:30

==== Latest finishes - By division ====
In any bout
Division	Fighter	Opponent	Event	Type of finish	Round	Time
Heavyweight	(Suriname) Jairzinho Rozenstruik	Alistair Overeem	UFC on ESPN 7	Knockout	5	4:56
Light Heavyweight	(Czech Republic) **Jiří Procházka**	Glover Teixeira	UFC 275	Submission	5	4:32
Middleweight	(Brazil) Anderson Silva	Chael Sonnen	UFC 117	Submission	5	3:10
Welterweight	(Nigeria) **Kamaru Usman**	**Colby Covington**	UFC 245	Knockout	5	4:10
Lightweight	(United States) **Max Holloway**	**Justin Gaethje**	UFC 300	Knockout	5	4:59
Featherweight	(Mexico) **Yair Rodríguez**	Chan Sung Jung	UFC Fight Night 139	Knockout	5	4:59
Bantamweight	(Russia) **Petr Yan**	José Aldo	UFC 251	Knockout	5	3:24
Flyweight	(United States) Demetrious Johnson	Kyoji Horiguchi	UFC 186	Submission	5	4:59
Women's Featherweight	(Brazil) Cris Cyborg	Tonya Evinger	UFC 214	Knockout	3	1:56
Women's Bantamweight	(United States) **Miesha Tate**	**Holly Holm**	UFC 196	Submission	5	3:30
Women's Flyweight	**(Mexico) Alexa Grasso**	**Valentina Shevchenko**	UFC 285	Submission	4	4:34
Women's Strawweight	(United States) **Rose Namajunas**	Paige VanZant	UFC Fight Night 80	Submission	5	2:25

In title bouts
Division	Fighter	Opponent	Event	Type of finish	Round	Time
Heavyweight	(United States) Cain Velasquez	Junior dos Santos	UFC 166	Knockout	5	3:09
Light Heavyweight	(Czech Republic) **Jiří Procházka**	Glover Teixeira	UFC 275	Submission	5	4:32
Middleweight	(Brazil) Anderson Silva	Chael Sonnen	UFC 117	Submission	5	3:10
Welterweight	(Nigeria) **Kamaru Usman**	**Colby Covington**	UFC 245	Knockout	5	4:10
Lightweight	(United States) **Justin Gaethje**	Tony Ferguson	UFC 249	Knockout	5	3:39
Featherweight	(United States) **Max Holloway**	Brian Ortega	UFC 231	Knockout	4	5:00
Bantamweight	(Russia) **Petr Yan**	José Aldo	UFC 251	Knockout	5	3:24
Flyweight	(United States) Demetrious Johnson	Kyoji Horiguchi	UFC 186	Submission	5	4:59
Women's Featherweight	(Brazil) Cris Cyborg	Tonya Evinger	UFC 214	Knockout	3	1:56
Women's Bantamweight	(United States) **Miesha Tate**	**Holly Holm**	UFC 196	Submission	5	3:30
Women's Flyweight	**(Mexico) Alexa Grasso**	**Valentina Shevchenko**	UFC 285	Submission	4	4:34
Women's Strawweight	(Poland) Joanna Jędrzejczyk	**Jessica Penne**	UFC Fight Night 69	Knockout	3	4:22

=== Highest finishes per win percentage ===
Since UFC adopted the rounds and judges system in UFC 21.

Updated as of April 11, 2026, after UFC 327.

	Fighter	Division/s	Finishes	Wins	%
1	(United States) Gerald Meerschaert	MW	12	12	100.00%
2	(Brazil) Vitor Belfort	MW \ LHW \ HW \ CW	14	15	93.33%
3	(Brazil) Gabriel Gonzaga	HW	11	12	91.67%
3	(United States) B.J. Penn	LW \ WW	11	12	91.67%
3	(Cameroon) Francis Ngannou	HW	11	12	91.67%
6	(Brazil) **Vicente Luque**	WW \ MW	15	17	88.24%
6	(United States) Matt Brown	WW	15	17	88.24%
8	(Brazil) **Charles Oliveira**	LW \ FTW \ CW	21	25	84.00%

1.Minimum 10 UFC wins.

== Knockouts ==
**Bold** - Active fighters

=== Most knockouts ===
==== Most knockouts - All fighters ====
Updated as of July 11, 2026 after UFC 329.

In any bout
	Fighter	Division	Knockouts
1	(United States) **Derrick Lewis**	HW	16
2	(United States) Matt Brown	WW	13
3	(United States) **Max Holloway**	LW \ FTW \ CW	12
3	(Brazil) Vitor Belfort (Note: Includes knockouts prior to UFC 28, which is when the Unified Rules of MMA started.)	HW \ LHW \ MW \ CW	12
5	(United States) **Drew Dober**	LW	11
5	(Brazil) Anderson Silva	LHW \ MW	11
5	(United States) Anthony Johnson	LHW \ MW \ WW	11
5	(Brazil) Thiago Santos	LHW \ MW	11
5	(United States) Dustin Poirier	LW \ FTW \ CW	11
In title bouts
	Fighter	Division	Knockouts
1	(Brazil) Anderson Silva	MW	7
2	(Brazil) **Alex Pereira**	LHW \ MW	6
3	(United States) Matt Hughes	WW	5
3	(United States) Randy Couture	HW \ LHW	5
3	(United States) Chuck Liddell	LHW	5
3	(United States) T.J. Dillashaw	BW	5

==== Most knockouts - By division ====
Updated to September 19, 2026 (after UFC 331).

In any bout
Division	Fighter	Knockouts
Heavyweight	(United States) **Derrick Lewis**	16
Light Heavyweight	(United States) Chuck Liddell (Note: Not listed in source. Information found in fighter's page.)	10
Middleweight	(Brazil) Anderson Silva	8
Middleweight	(Brazil) Thiago Santos	8
Middleweight	(United States) Uriah Hall	8
Welterweight	(United States) Matt Brown	13
Lightweight	(United States) **Drew Dober**	11
Featherweight	(United States) **Max Holloway**	9
Bantamweight	(United States) **Sean O'Malley**	7
Bantamweight	(Ecuador) **Marlon Vera**	7
Bantamweight	(United States) T.J. Dillashaw	7
Flyweight	(Angola) **Manel Kape**	6
Women's Featherweight	(Brazil) Cris Cyborg	2
Women's Featherweight	(Australia) Megan Anderson	2
Women's Featherweight	(Canada) Felicia Spencer	2
Women's Bantamweight	(Brazil) **Amanda Nunes**	6
Women's Flyweight	(Kyrgyzstan) **Valentina Shevchenko**	4
Women's Strawweight	(Brazil) **Jéssica Andrade**	4
Women's Strawweight	(Brazil) **Denise Gomes**	4

In title bouts
Division	Fighter	Knockouts
Heavyweight	(United States) Stipe Miocic	4
Light Heavyweight	(Brazil) **Alex Pereira**	5
Light Heavyweight	(United States) Chuck Liddell	5
Middleweight	(Brazil) Anderson Silva	7
Welterweight	(United States) Matt Hughes	5
Lightweight	(United States) **Justin Gaethje**	2
Lightweight	(United States) B.J. Penn	2
Featherweight	(United States) **Max Holloway**	4
Bantamweight	(United States) T.J. Dillashaw	5
Flyweight	(United States) Demetrious Johnson	2
Women's Featherweight	(Brazil) Cris Cyborg	2
Women's Bantamweight	(Brazil) **Amanda Nunes**	3
Women's Bantamweight	(United States) Ronda Rousey	3
Women's Flyweight	(Kyrgyzstan) **Valentina Shevchenko**	4
Women's Strawweight	**(United States) Rose Namajunas**	2
Women's Strawweight	(Poland) Joanna Jędrzejczyk	2

==== Most consecutive knockouts - All fighters ====
Updated as of July 12, 2025 after UFC on ESPN: Lewis vs. Teixeira.

In any bout
	Fighter	Division	Consecutive Knockouts
1	(United States) Chuck Liddell	LHW	7
2	(Russia) Sergei Pavlovich	HW	6
3	(United States) Ricco Rodriguez	HW	5
3	(Brazil) Thiago Alves	WW \ CW	5
3	(Brazil) Junior dos Santos	HW	5
3	(United States) Matt Brown	WW	5
3	(Republic of Ireland) Conor McGregor	FTW	5
3	(United States) Stipe Miocic	HW	5
3	(Russia) Mairbek Taisumov	LW	5
3	(Cameroon) Francis Ngannou	HW	5
3	(Australia) Tai Tuivasa	HW	5
3	(United States) Steve Garcia	LW \ FTW	5

==== Most knockouts - In a single event ====
Updated as of October 3, 2026 after UFC 332.

	Event	Date	Knockouts
1	UFC 332	October 3, 2026	11
2	UFC Fight Night 258	September 6, 2025	9
3	UFC 92	December 27, 2008	8
3	UFC on Fox 7	April 20, 2013	8
3	UFC Fight Night 45	July 16, 2014	8
3	UFC 199	June 4, 2016	8
3	UFC 218	December 2, 2017	8
3	UFC Fight Night 197	November 13, 2021	8
3	UFC on ESPN 37	June 18, 2022	8
3	UFC on ESPN 42	December 3, 2022	8
3	UFC on ESPN 54	March 30, 2024	8
3	UFC Fight Night 271	March 28, 2026	8
3	UFC Fight Night 283	August 1, 2026	8
3	UFC Fight Night 285	August 22, 2026	8
3	UFC Fight Night 286	August 29, 2026	8

==== Most first-round knockouts - In a single event ====
	Event	Date	Venue	City	1st RD KOs
1	UFC 332	October 3, 2026	Delta Center	Salt Lake City, Utah	9
2	TUF 1 Finale	April 9, 2005	Cox Pavilion	Las Vegas, Nevada	7
2	UFC 329	July 11, 2026	T-Mobile Arena	Las Vegas, Nevada	7
2	UFC Fight Night 283	August 1, 2026	Belgrade Arena	Belgrade, Serbia	7

==== Highest percentage of knockouts - In a single event ====
	Event	Date	Venue	City	Fights	Knockouts	KO Finish Percentage
1	UFC Freedom 250	June 14, 2026	White House	Washington, DC	7	7	100%

=== Fastest knockouts ===
==== Fastest knockouts - All fighters ====
In any bout
	Fighter	Opponent	Division	Event	Time
1	(United States) Jorge Masvidal	Ben Askren	WW	UFC 239	0:05
2	(United States) Duane Ludwig	Jonathan Goulet	WW	UFC Fight Night 3	0:06 (Note: Official UFC records have the bout time at 0:11, Dana White and UFC officials have admitted the actual KO time was 0:06. The NSAC cannot retroactively amend bout times.)
3	(United States) Todd Duffee	Tim Hague	HW	UFC 102	0:07
3	(South Korea) Chan Sung Jung	Mark Hominick	FTW	UFC 140	0:07
3	(Canada) Ryan Jimmo	Anthony Perosh	LHW	UFC 149	0:07
3	(United States) **Terrance McKinney**	**Matt Frevola**	LW	UFC 263	0:07
6	(United States) Don Frye	Thomas Ramirez	HW	UFC 8	0:08
6	(United States) James Irvin	Houston Alexander	LHW	UFC Fight Night 13	0:08
6	(England) **Leon Edwards**	Seth Baczynski	WW	UFC Fight Night 64	0:08
6	(Finland) Makwan Amirkhani	Andy Ogle	FTW	UFC on Fox 14	0:08
6	(Turkey) **Abdul-Rakhman Yakhayev**	**Julius Walker**	LHW	UFC Fight Night 280	0:08

In title bouts
	Fighter	Opponent	Championship	Event	Time
1	(Republic of Ireland) **Conor McGregor**	José Aldo	FTW	UFC 194	0:13
2	(Belarus) Andrei Arlovski	Paul Buentello	HW	UFC 55	0:15
3	(United States) Ronda Rousey	Alexis Davis	W-BW	UFC 175	0:16
4	(United States) Frank Shamrock	Igor Zinoviev	LHW	UFC 16	0:22
5	(Myanmar) **Joshua Van**	**Alexandre Pantoja**	FLW	UFC 323	0:26

==== Fastest knockouts - By division ====
In any bout
Division	Fighter	Opponent	Event	Time
Heavyweight	(United States) Todd Duffee	Tim Hague	UFC 102	0:07
Light Heavyweight	(Canada) Ryan Jimmo	Anthony Perosh	UFC 149	0:07
Middleweight	(England) Mark Weir	Eugene Jackson	UFC 38	0:10
Welterweight	(United States) Jorge Masvidal	Ben Askren	UFC 239	0:05
Lightweight	(United States) **Terrance McKinney**	**Matt Frevola**	UFC 263	0:07
Featherweight	(South Korea) Chan Sung Jung	Mark Hominick	UFC 140	0:07
Bantamweight	(Mexico) Erik Perez	Ken Stone	UFC 150	0:17
Flyweight	(United States) Dustin Ortiz	Hector Sandoval	UFC Fight Night 114	0:15
Women's Featherweight	(Netherlands) Germaine de Randamie	Aspen Ladd	UFC Fight Night 155	0:16
Women's Bantamweight	(United States) Ronda Rousey	Alexis Davis	UFC 175	0:16
Women's Flyweight	(Brazil) **Priscila Cachoeira**	Shana Dobson	UFC Fight Night 168	0:40
Women's Strawweight	(Brazil) **Denise Gomes**	**Yazmin Jauregui**	UFC 290	0:20

In title bouts
Division	Fighter	Opponent	Event	Time
Heavyweight	(Belarus) Andrei Arlovski	Paul Buentello	UFC 55	0:15
Light Heavyweight	(United States) Frank Shamrock	Igor Zinoviev	UFC 16	0:22
Middleweight	(United States) Rich Franklin	Nate Quarry	UFC 56	2:34
Welterweight	(United States) Tyron Woodley	Robbie Lawler	UFC 201	2:12
Lightweight	(Brazil) **Rafael dos Anjos**	Donald Cerrone	UFC on Fox 17	1:06
Featherweight	(Republic of Ireland) **Conor McGregor**	José Aldo	UFC 194	0:13
Bantamweight	(Brazil) Renan Barão	Urijah Faber	UFC 169	3:42
Flyweight	(Myanmar) **Joshua Van**	**Alexandre Pantoja**	UFC 323	0:26
Women's Featherweight	(Brazil) **Amanda Nunes**	Cris Cyborg	UFC 232	0:51
Women's Bantamweight	(United States) Ronda Rousey	Alexis Davis	UFC 175	0:16
Women's Flyweight	(Kyrgyzstan) **Valentina Shevchenko**	Jessica Eye	UFC 238	5:26
Women's Strawweight	(China) **Zhang Weili**	**Jessica Andrade**	UFC Fight Night 157	0:42

=== Latest knockouts ===
==== Latest knockouts - All fighters ====
In any bout
	Fighter	Opponent	Division	Event	Round	Time
1	(Mexico) **Yair Rodríguez**	Chan Sung Jung	FTW	UFC Fight Night 139	5	4:59
1	(United States) **Max Holloway**	**Justin Gaethje**	LW	UFC 300	5	4:59
3	(Suriname) Jairzinho Rozenstruik	Alistair Overeem	HW	UFC on ESPN 7	5	4:56
4	(Nigeria) **Kamaru Usman**	**Colby Covington**	WW	UFC 245	5	4:10
5	(England) **Leon Edwards**	**Kamaru Usman**	WW	UFC 278	5	4:04
6	(United States) **Justin Gaethje**	Tony Ferguson	LW	UFC 249	5	3:39
7	(United States) Cain Velasquez	Junior Dos Santos	HW	UFC 166	5	3:09
8	(United States) Ricco Rodriguez	Randy Couture	HW	UFC 39	5	3:04

In title bouts
	Fighter	Opponent	Division	Event	Round	Time
1	(Nigeria) **Kamaru Usman**	**Colby Covington**	WW	UFC 245	5	4:10
2	(England) **Leon Edwards**	**Kamaru Usman**	WW	UFC 278	5	4:04
3	(United States) Cain Velasquez	Junior Dos Santos	HW	UFC 166	5	3:09
4	(United States) Ricco Rodriguez	Randy Couture	HW	UFC 39	5	3:04
5	(United States) B.J. Penn	Diego Sanchez	LW	UFC 107	5	2:37
6	(United States) T.J. Dillashaw	Renan Barão	BW	UFC 173	5	2:26
7	(United States) T.J. Dillashaw	Joe Soto	BW	UFC 177	5	2:20

==== Latest knockouts - By division ====
In any bout
Division	Fighter	Opponent	Event	Round	Time
Heavyweight	(Suriname) Jairzinho Rozenstruik	Alistair Overeem	UFC on ESPN 7	5	4:56
Light Heavyweight	(Sweden) Alexander Gustafsson	Glover Teixeira	UFC Fight Night 109	5	1:07
Middleweight	(United States) **Anthony Hernandez**	**Michel Pereira**	UFC Fight Night 245	5	2:22
Welterweight	(Nigeria) **Kamaru Usman**	**Colby Covington**	UFC 245	5	4:10
Lightweight	(United States) **Max Holloway**	**Justin Gaethje**	UFC 300	5	4:59
Featherweight	(Mexico) **Yair Rodríguez**	Chan Sung Jung	UFC Fight Night 139	5	4:59
Bantamweight	(Russia) **Petr Yan**	**Jose Aldo**	UFC 251	5	3:24
Flyweight	(Mexico) **Brandon Moreno**	**Deiveson Figueiredo**	UFC 283	3	5:00
Women's Featherweight	(Brazil) Cris Cyborg	Tonya Evinger	UFC 214	3	1:56
Women's Bantamweight	(Brazil) **Amanda Nunes**	**Raquel Pennington**	UFC 224	5	2:36
Women's Flyweight	(Kyrgyzstan) **Valentina Shevchenko**	Lauren Murphy	UFC 266	4	4:00
Women's Strawweight	(Poland) Joanna Jędrzejczyk	**Jessica Penne**	UFC Fight Night 69	3	4:22

In title bouts
Division	Fighter	Opponent	Event	Round	Time
Heavyweight	(United States) Cain Velasquez	Junior Dos Santos	UFC 166	5	3:09
Light Heavyweight (Note: Light Heavyweight bout in deprecated UFC Middleweight (171-199 lbs.) class (now known as Light Heavyweight))	(United States) Frank Shamrock	Tito Ortiz	UFC 22	4	4:42
Middleweight	(Brazil) **Alex Pereira**	**Israel Adesanya**	UFC 281	5	2:01
Welterweight	(Nigeria) **Kamaru Usman**	**Colby Covington**	UFC 245	5	4:10
Lightweight	(United States) **Justin Gaethje**	Tony Ferguson	UFC 249	5	3:39
Featherweight	(United States) **Max Holloway**	Brian Ortega	UFC 231	4	5:00
Bantamweight	(Russia) **Petr Yan**	**Jose Aldo**	UFC 251	5	3:24
Flyweight	(Mexico) **Brandon Moreno**	**Deiveson Figueiredo**	UFC 283	3	5:00
Women's Featherweight	(Brazil) Cris Cyborg	Tonya Evinger	UFC 214	3	1:56
Women's Bantamweight	(Brazil) **Amanda Nunes**	**Raquel Pennington**	UFC 224	5	2:36
Women's Flyweight	(Kyrgyzstan) **Valentina Shevchenko**	Lauren Murphy	UFC 266	4	4:00
Women's Strawweight	(Poland) Joanna Jędrzejczyk	**Jessica Penne**	UFC Fight Night 69	3	4:22

== Submissions ==
**Bold** - Active fighters

=== Most submissions ===
==== Most submissions - All fighters ====
Updated as of May 9, 2026 after UFC 328.

In any bout
	Fighter	Division	Submissions
1	(Brazil) **Charles Oliveira**	LW \ FTW	17
2	(United States) **Jim Miller**	LW \ WW \ CW	14
3	(Brazil) Demian Maia	MW \ WW	11
3	(United States) Gerald Meerschaert	MW	11
5	(Brazil) Royce Gracie (Note: Not listed in source. Information found in fighter's page.)	WW \ OW \ CW	10
6	(United States) Nate Diaz	WW \ LW \ CW	9
6	(United States) Michael Chiesa	WW \ LW	9
8	(Iceland) **Gunnar Nelson**	WW \ CW	8
8	(Russia) **Islam Makhachev**	LW	8
8	(United States) Frank Mir	HW	8

In title bouts
	Fighter	Division	Submissions
1	(United States) Demetrious Johnson	FLW	5
2	(United States) Jon Jones	LHW \ HW	4
3	(Russia) **Islam Makhachev**	LW	3
3	(United States) B.J. Penn	WW \ LW	3
3	(United States) Ronda Rousey	W-BW	3
3	(United States) Matt Hughes	WW	3
3	(Russia) Khabib Nurmagomedov	LW	3

==== Most submissions - By division ====
Updated as of November 14, 2026 after UFC 334.

In any bout
Division	Fighter	Submissions
Heavyweight	(United States) Frank Mir	8
Light Heavyweight	(Brazil) Glover Teixeira	7
Middleweight	(United States) Gerald Meerschaert	11
Welterweight	(Iceland) **Gunnar Nelson**	7
Lightweight	(United States) **Jim Miller**	12
Featherweight	(Brazil) **Charles Oliveira**	6
Bantamweight	(Brazil) **Rani Yahya**	6
Bantamweight	(United States) Urijah Faber	6
Flyweight	(Brazil) **Alexandre Pantoja**	6
Women's Featherweight	(United States) **Macy Chiasson**	1
Women's Featherweight	(United States) **Raquel Pennington**	1
Women's Featherweight	(Canada) Felicia Spencer	1
Women's Featherweight	(Brazil) **Amanda Nunes**	1
Women's Featherweight	(Australia) Megan Anderson	1
Women's Featherweight	(Switzerland) Stephanie Egger	1
Women's Bantamweight	(Brazil) **Beatriz Mesquita**	4
Women's Flyweight	(Canada) **Gillian Robertson**	6
Women's Strawweight	(Brazil) **Mackenzie Dern**	5

In title bouts
Division	Fighter	Submissions
Heavyweight	(Belarus) Andrei Arlovski	1
Heavyweight	(United States) Brock Lesnar	1
Heavyweight	(United States) Frank Mir	1
Heavyweight	(Brazil) Antônio Rodrigo Nogueira	1
Heavyweight	(United States) Mark Coleman	1
Heavyweight	(Brazil) Fabrício Werdum	1
Heavyweight	(United States) Daniel Cormier	1
Heavyweight	(United States) Jon Jones	1
Light Heavyweight	(United States) Frank Shamrock (Note: 2 of 3 submissions in deprecated UFC Middleweight (171-199 lbs.) class (now known as Light Heavyweight) and 1 of 3 submissions in first deprecated UFC Lightweight (< 199 lbs.) class (now known as Light Heavyweight))	3
Light Heavyweight	(United States) Jon Jones	3
Middleweight	(Brazil) Anderson Silva	2
Welterweight	(United States) Matt Hughes	3
Lightweight	(Russia) **Islam Makhachev**	3
Lightweight	(Russia) Khabib Nurmagomedov	3
Featherweight	(Mexico) **Yair Rodríguez**	1
Bantamweight	(Georgia (country)) **Merab Dvalishvili**	1
Bantamweight	(Brazil) Renan Barão	1
Flyweight	(United States) Demetrious Johnson	5
Women's Featherweight	(Brazil) **Amanda Nunes**	1
Women's Bantamweight	(United States) Ronda Rousey	3
Women's Flyweight	(Mexico) **Alexa Grasso**	1
Women's Strawweight	(United States) Carla Esparza	1
Women's Strawweight	(China) **Zhang Weili**	1

==== Most consecutive submissions - All fighters ====
Updated as of November 14, 2026 after UFC 334.

In any bout
	Fighter	Division	Consecutive Submissions
1	(Brazil) Royce Gracie	OW	6
2	(Brazil) **Valter Walker**	HW	5
2	(Brazil) Demian Maia	MW	5
4	(Brazil) **Charles Oliveira**	LW	4
4	(United States) **Brendan Allen**	MW	4
4	(Brazil) **Beatriz Mesquita**	W-BW	4

==== Most submissions - In a single event ====
	Event	Date	Submissions
1	UFC 2	March 11, 1994	10
2	UFC 4	December 16, 1994	8
2	The Ultimate Fighter: Brazil 2 Finale	June 8, 2013	8
4	Ultimate Ultimate 1995	December 16, 1995	6
4	The Ultimate Fighter 6 Finale	December 8, 2007	6
4	UFC Fight Night 17	February 7, 2009	6
4	UFC on Fuel TV 2	April 14, 2012	6
4	UFC Fight Night 80	December 10, 2015	6
4	UFC Fight Night 90	July 7, 2016	6
4	UFC Fight Night 232	November 18, 2023	6
4	UFC Fight Night 239	March 16, 2024	6
4	UFC Fight Night 263	November 1, 2025	6

=== Fastest submissions ===
==== Fastest submissions - All fighters ====
In any bout
	Fighter	Opponent	Division	Event	Time
1	(Russia) Oleg Taktarov	Anthony Macias	HW	UFC 6	0:09
2	(United States) Joe Charles	Kevin Rosier	HW	UFC 4	0:14
2	(United States) Ronda Rousey	Cat Zingano	W-BW	UFC 184	0:14
2	(United States) Justin Martin	Eric Martin	HW	UFC 12	0:14
5	(United States) Frank Shamrock	Kevin Jackson	LHW	UFC 15.5	0:16
5	(Brazil) Marcus Aurélio	Ryan Roberts	LW	UFC Fight Night 13	0:16

In title bouts
	Fighter	Opponent	Championship	Event	Time
1	(United States) Ronda Rousey	Cat Zingano	W-BW	UFC 184	0:14
2	(United States) Frank Shamrock	Kevin Jackson	LHW	UFC 15.5	0:16
3	(Belarus) Andrei Arlovski	Tim Sylvia	HW	UFC 51	0:47
4	(United States) Frank Mir	Tim Sylvia	HW	UFC 48	0:50
5	(United States) Tito Ortiz	Yuki Kondo	LHW	UFC 29	1:52

==== Fastest submissions - By division ====
In any bout
Division	Fighter	Opponent	Event	Time
Heavyweight	(Russia) Oleg Taktarov	Anthony Macias	UFC 6	0:09
Light Heavyweight	(United States) Frank Shamrock	Kevin Jackson	UFC Japan	0:16 (Note: Light Heavyweight submission in first deprecated UFC Lightweight (< 199 lbs.) class (now known as Light Heavyweight))
Middleweight	(United States) Rory Singer	Ross Pointon	The Ultimate Fighter 3 Finale	0:44
Welterweight	(United States) Dennis Hallman	Matt Hughes	UFC 29	0:20
Lightweight	(Brazil) Marcus Aurélio	Ryan Roberts	UFC Fight Night 13	0:16
Featherweight	(United States) Chas Skelly	Maximo Blanco	UFC Fight Night 94	0:19
Bantamweight	(United States) Patrick Williams	Alejandro Pérez	UFC 188	0:23
Flyweight	(United States) Ben Nguyen	**Tim Elliott**	UFC Fight Night 110	0:49
Women's Featherweight	(Brazil) **Amanda Nunes**	Megan Anderson	UFC 259	2:03
Women's Bantamweight	(United States) Ronda Rousey	Cat Zingano	UFC 184	0:14
Women's Flyweight	(Canada) **Gillian Robertson**	Emily Whitmire	The Ultimate Fighter 26 Finale	2:12
Women's Strawweight	(United States) Emily Whitmire	Aleksandra Albu	UFC on ESPN 1	1:01

In title bouts
Division	Fighter	Opponent	Event	Time
Heavyweight	(Belarus) Andrei Arlovski	Tim Sylvia	UFC 51	0:47
Light Heavyweight	(United States) Frank Shamrock	Kevin Jackson	UFC Japan	0:16
Middleweight	(Brazil) Anderson Silva	Dan Henderson	UFC 82	9:52
Welterweight	(United States) Matt Hughes	Frank Trigg	UFC 45	3:54
Lightweight	(Brazil) **Charles Oliveira**	**Justin Gaethje**	UFC 274	3:22
Featherweight	(Mexico) **Yair Rodriguez**	**Josh Emmett**	UFC 284	9:19
Bantamweight	(Georgia (country)) **Merab Dvalishvili**	**Sean O’Malley**	UFC 316	14:42
Flyweight	(Brazil) **Deiveson Figueiredo**	**Alex Perez**	UFC 255	1:57
Women's Featherweight	(Brazil) **Amanda Nunes**	Megan Anderson	UFC 259	2:03
Women's Bantamweight	(United States) Ronda Rousey	Cat Zingano	UFC 184	0:14
Women's Flyweight	(Mexico) **Alexa Grasso**	**Valentina Shevchenko**	UFC 285	19:34
Women's Strawweight	(China) **Zhang Weili**	Carla Esparza	UFC 281	6:05

=== Latest submissions ===
==== Latest submissions - All fighters ====
In any bout
	Fighter	Opponent	Division	Event	Round	Time
1	(United States) Demetrious Johnson	Kyoji Horiguchi	FLW	UFC 186	5	4:59
2	(United States) Frankie Edgar	Cub Swanson	FTW	UFC Fight Night 57	5	4:56
3	(Czech Republic) **Jiří Procházka**	Glover Teixeira	LHW	UFC 275	5	4:32
4	(United States) Demetrious Johnson	John Moraga	FLW	UFC on Fox 8	5	3:43
5	(United States) **Miesha Tate**	**Holly Holm**	W-BW	UFC 196	5	3:30

In title bouts
	Fighter	Opponent	Division	Event	Round	Time
1	(United States) Demetrious Johnson	Kyoji Horiguchi	FLW	UFC 186	5	4:59
2	(Czech Republic) **Jiří Procházka**	Glover Teixeira	LHW	UFC 275	5	4:32
3	(United States) Demetrious Johnson	John Moraga	FLW	UFC on Fox 8	5	3:43
4	(United States) **Miesha Tate**	**Holly Holm**	W-BW	UFC 196	5	3:30
5	(United States) Demetrious Johnson	Ray Borg	FLW	UFC 216	5	3:15

==== Latest submissions - By division ====
In any bout
Division	Fighter	Opponent	Event	Round	Time
Heavyweight	(France) **Ciryl Gane**	**Don'Tale Mayes**	UFC Fight Night 162	3	4:46
Light Heavyweight	(Czech Republic) **Jiří Procházka**	Glover Teixeira	UFC 275	5	4:32
Middleweight	(Brazil) Anderson Silva	Chael Sonnen	UFC 117	5	3:10
Welterweight	(United States) Benson Henderson	Brandon Thatch	UFC Fight Night 60	4	3:58
Lightweight	(Russia) **Islam Makhachev**	Dustin Poirier	UFC 302	5	2:42
Featherweight	(United States) Frankie Edgar	Cub Swanson	UFC Fight Night 57	5	4:56
Bantamweight	(Brazil) Renan Barão	Michael McDonald	UFC on Fuel TV 7	4	3:57
Flyweight	(United States) Demetrious Johnson	Kyoji Horiguchi	UFC 186	5	4:59
Women's Featherweight	(United States) **Raquel Pennington**	**Macy Chiasson**	UFC Fight Night 199	2	3:07
Women's Bantamweight	(United States) **Miesha Tate**	**Holly Holm**	UFC 196	5	3:30
Women's Flyweight	(Mexico) **Alexa Grasso**	**Valentina Shevchenko**	UFC 285	4	4:34
Women's Strawweight	(United States) **Rose Namajunas**	Paige VanZant	UFC Fight Night 80	5	2:25

In title bouts
Division	Fighter	Opponent	Event	Round	Time
Heavyweight	(Brazil) Fabrício Werdum	Cain Velasquez	UFC 188	3	2:13
Light Heavyweight	(Czech Republic) **Jiří Procházka**	Glover Teixeira	UFC 275	5	4:32
Middleweight	(Brazil) Anderson Silva	Chael Sonnen	UFC 117	5	3:10
Welterweight	(Canada) Carlos Newton	Pat Miletich	UFC 31	3	2:50
Lightweight	(Russia) **Islam Makhachev**	Dustin Poirier	UFC 302	5	2:42
Featherweight	(Mexico) **Yair Rodríguez**	**Josh Emmett**	UFC 284	2	4:19
Bantamweight	(Brazil) Renan Barão	Michael McDonald	UFC on Fuel TV 7	4	3:57
Flyweight	(United States) Demetrious Johnson	Kyoji Horiguchi	UFC 186	5	4:59
Women's Featherweight	(Brazil) **Amanda Nunes**	Megan Anderson	UFC 259	1	2:03
Women's Bantamweight	(United States) **Miesha Tate**	**Holly Holm**	UFC 196	5	3:30
Women's Flyweight	(Mexico) **Alexa Grasso**	**Valentina Shevchenko**	UFC 285	4	4:34
Women's Strawweight	(United States) Carla Esparza	**Rose Namajunas**	The Ultimate Fighter 20 Finale	3	1:26

=== Highest submissions per win percentage ===
	Fighter	Division	SUBs	Wins	%
1	(Brazil) **Valter Walker**	HW	5	5	100.00%
1	(Brazil) **Beatriz Mesquita**	W-BW	4	4	100.00%
3	(United States) Gerald Meerschaert	MW	11	12	91.67%
4	(Brazil) Royce Gracie	WW \ OW \ CW	10	11	90.91%
5	(United States) **Mickey Gall**	WW	5	6	83.33%
5	(Russia) Oleg Taktarov	OW	5	6	83.33%
7	(Iceland) **Gunnar Nelson**	WW \ CW	8	10	80.00%

=== First-ever Submissions executed in UFC history ===
Submission	Fighter	Opponent	Event	Round	Time
Heel Hook	(United States) Ken Shamrock	Patrick Smith	UFC 1	-	1:49
Rear-Naked Choke	(Brazil) Royce Gracie	Ken Shamrock	UFC 1	-	0:57
Lapel Choke	(Brazil) Royce Gracie	Minoki Ichihara	UFC 2	-	5:08
Triangle Choke	(United States) Jason DeLucia	Scott Baker	UFC 2	-	6:41
Forearm Choke	(Netherlands) Remco Pardoel	Alberto Cerra Leon	UFC 2	-	9:51
Armbar	(Netherlands) Frank Hamaker	Thaddeus Luster	UFC 2	-	4:52
Guillotine Choke	(United States) Patrick Smith	Ray Wizard	UFC 2	-	0:58
Bulldog Choke	(United States) Johnny Rhodes	Fred Ettish	UFC 2	-	3:07
Blood Choke (Finger Choke)	(United States) Keith Hackney	Joe Son	UFC 4	-	2:44
Arm Triangle Choke	(United States) Dan Severn	Marcus Bossett	UFC 4	-	0:52
Key Lock (Americana)	(United States) Dan Severn	Dave Beneteau	UFC 5	-	3:01
Neck Crank	(United States) Tank Abbott	Steve Jennum	Ultimate Ultimate 1995	-	1:14
Knee Bar	(United States) Ken Shamrock	Kimo Leopoldo	UFC 8	-	4:24
Scarf Hold Choke	(United States) Mark Coleman	Julian Sanchez	UFC 11	-	0:45
Achilles Lock (Ankle Lock)	(United States) Don Frye	Mark Hall	Ultimate Ultimate 1996	-	0:20
Chin to the Eye	(United States) Mark Kerr	Dan Bobish	UFC 14	-	1:38
Shoulder choke	(United States) Pat Miletich	Townsend Saunders	UFC 16	1	9:01
Inverted Arm Triangle Choke	(United States) Jeremy Horn	Chuck Liddell	UFC 19	1	12:00
Inside Shoulder Lock (Mir Lock)	(United States) Frank Mir	Pete Williams	UFC 36	1	0:46
Toe Hold	(United States) Frank Mir	Tank Abbott	UFC 41	1	0:45
Body Triangle	(Canada) Ivan Salaverry	Tony Fryklund	UFC 50	1	1:36
Von Flue choke	(United States) Jason Von Flue	Alex Karalexis	UFC Ultimate Fight Night 3	3	1:17
North-South choke	(United States) Jeff Monson	Branden Lee Hinkle	UFC 57	1	4:35
D'Arce Choke (Brabo Choke)	(United States) Kendall Grove	Alan Belcher	UFC 69	2	4:42
Anaconda choke	(Brazil) Renato Sobral	David Heath	UFC 74	2	3:30
Mounted Triangle Choke	(Brazil) Damian Maia	Ed Herman	UFC 83	2	2:27
Peruvian Necktie	(United States) C. B. Dollaway	Jesse Taylor	UFC Fight Night: Silva vs. Irvin	1	3:58
Schultz Choke	(United States) Matt Hughes	Ricardo Almeida	UFC 117	1	3:15
Pillory choke	(United States) Nick Pace	Will Campuzano	The Ultimate Fighter 12 Finale	3	4:32
Twister	(South Korea) Chan Sung Jung	Leonard Garcia	UFC Fight Night: Nogueira vs. Davis	2	4:59
Reverse Calf Slicer	(Brazil) **Charles Oliveira**	Eric Wisely	UFC on Fox: Evans vs. Davis	1	1:43
Mounted Triangle Armbar	(United States) Dustin Poirier	**Max Holloway**	UFC 143	1	3:23
Omoplata	(United States) Ben Saunders	Chris Heatherly	UFC Fight Night: Henderson vs. dos Anjos	1	2:18
Suloev Stretch	(United States) Kenny Robertson	Brock Jardine	UFC 157	1	2:57
Inverted Triangle Kimura	(United States) Luke Rockhold	Tim Boetsch	UFC 172	1	2:08
Reverse Bulldog Choke	(United States) Yancy Medeiros	**Damon Jackson**	UFC 177	2	1:54
Japanese Necktie	(Brazil) **Matheus Nicolau**	Bruno Mesquita	UFC Fight Night: Belfort vs. Henderson 3	3	3:27
Ezekiel Choke	(Russia) Aleksei Oleinik	Viktor Pešta	UFC Fight Night: Rodríguez vs. Penn	1	2:57
Straight Armlock	(Spain) **Juan Espino**	**Justin Frazier**	The Ultimate Fighter 28 Finale	1	3:36
Standing Arm Triangle Choke	(Brazil) **Jéssica Andrade**	**Amanda Lemos**	UFC Fight Night: Lemos vs. Andrade	1	3:13
Inverted Triangle Choke	(England) **Davey Grant**	**Raphael Assunção**	UFC Fight Night: Yan vs. Dvalishvili	3	4:43
Ninja Choke	(Brazil) **Joanderson Brito**	**Jonathan Pearce**	UFC Fight Night 232	2	3:54
Capsule Lock (Ankle Lock)	(Romania) **Alice Ardelean**	**Polyana Viana**	UFC Fight Night: Allen vs. Costa	2	4:36
Scottish Twister	(Kyrgyzstan) **Murtazali Magomedov**	**Melsik Baghdasaryan**	UFC Fight Night 279	1	1:17

1.Minimum 5 UFC SUBs.

== Decisions ==
=== Most Decision bouts ===
All fighters
	Fighter	Division	Wins	Losses	Draws	Total
1	(United States) Angela Hill	W-SW	11	14	0	25
2	(Brazil) Rafael dos Anjos	LW \ WW	12	10	0	22
3	(United States) Jim Miller	LW \ WW	8	13	0	21
3	(United States) Diego Sanchez	FTW \ LW \ WW \ MW	12	9	0	21
5	(United States) Brad Tavares	MW	14	6	0	20
5	(United States) Clay Guida	FTW \ LW	11	9	0	20
7	(United States) Jeremy Stephens	FTW \ LW	7	12	0	19
7	(Belarus) Andrei Arlovski	HW	12	7	0	19
7	(Brazil) Demian Maia	WW \ MW	10	9	0	19
10	(United States) Darren Elkins	FTW	12	6	0	18
10	(United States) Frankie Edgar	FTW \ LW	11	6	1	18

By division
Division	Fighter	Wins	Losses	Draws	Total
Heavyweight	(Belarus) Andrei Arlovski	12	7	0	19
Light Heavyweight	(Poland) Jan Błachowicz	5	6	2	13
Middleweight	(United States) Brad Tavares	14	6	0	20
Welterweight	(United States) Neil Magny	14	3	0	17
Lightweight	(United States) Jim Miller	7	13	0	20
Featherweight	(United States) Darren Elkins	12	6	0	18
Bantamweight	(Ecuador) Marlon Vera	4	11	0	15
Flyweight	(United States) Tim Elliott	7	7	0	14
Women's Featherweight	(Brazil) Norma Dumont	5	0	0	5
Women's Bantamweight	(United States) Raquel Pennington	10	4	0	14
Women's Flyweight	(United States) Andrea Lee	3	9	0	12
Women's Flyweight	(Brazil) Viviane Araújo	6	6	0	12
Women's Strawweight	(United States) Angela Hill	10	14	0	24

=== Most Decision wins - All fighters ===
Unanimous Decision wins
	Fighter	Division	Wins
1	(Georgia (country)) Merab Dvalishvili	BW	12
2	(Brazil) Rafael dos Anjos	LW	11
2	(United States) Belal Muhammad	WW	11
2	(United States) Brad Tavares	MW	11
2	(Nigeria) Kamaru Usman	WW	11
6	(United States) Neil Magny	WW	10
6	(Australia) Robert Whittaker	WW \ MW	10
6	(United States) Angela Hill	W-SW	10
6	(Canada) Georges St-Pierre	WW	10
6	(United States) Frankie Edgar	FTW \ LW	10
6	(Brazil) José Aldo	BW \ FTW	10
6	(United States) Darren Elkins	FW	10

Split Decision wins
	Fighter	Division	Wins
1	(United States) Andre Fili	FTW	5
1	(United States) Sean Strickland	MW \ WW	5
1	(Brazil) Gleison Tibau	LW	5
4	(United States) Neil Magny	WW	4
4	(United States) Rashad Evans	LHW \ HW	4
4	(United States) Benson Henderson	LW \ WW	4
4	(United States) John Howard	WW \ MW	4
4	(United States) Clay Guida	FTW \ LW	4

=== Most Decision wins - By division ===
Unanimous Decision wins
Division	Fighter	Wins
Heavyweight	(Belarus) Andrei Arlovski	9
Light Heavyweight	(United States) Jon Jones	9
Middleweight	(United States) Brad Tavares	11
Welterweight	(United States) Belal Muhammad	11
Welterweight	(Nigeria) Kamaru Usman	11
Lightweight	(Brazil) Rafael dos Anjos	7
Lightweight	(Brazil) Francisco Trinaldo	7
Featherweight	(United States) Darren Elkins	10
Bantamweight	(Georgia (country)) Merab Dvalishvili	11
Flyweight	(United States) Tim Elliott	7
Women's Featherweight	(Brazil) Norma Dumont	4
Women's Bantamweight	(United States) Raquel Pennington	7
Women's Flyweight	(United States) Katlyn Cerminara	8
Women's Strawweight	(United States) Angela Hill	9

Split Decision wins
Division	Fighter	Wins
Heavyweight	(Belarus) Andrei Arlovski	3
Light Heavyweight	(United States) Rashad Evans	3
Light Heavyweight	(United States) Gian Villante	3
Middleweight	(United States) Brad Tavares	3
Middleweight	(United States) Sean Strickland	3
Middleweight	(Poland) Krzysztof Jotko	3
Welterweight	(United States) Neil Magny	4
Lightweight	(Brazil) Gleison Tibau	5
Featherweight	(United States) Andre Fili	5
Bantamweight	(Brazil) Raphael Assunção	3
Bantamweight	(Japan) Takeya Mizugaki	3
Bantamweight	(Canada) Yves Jabouin	3
Bantamweight	(South Korea) Kang Kyung-ho	3
Flyweight	(United States) Brandon Royval	3
Flyweight	(United States) Dustin Ortiz	3
Women's Featherweight	(Brazil) Norma Dumont	1
Women's Featherweight	(Brazil) Karol Rosa	1
Women's Bantamweight	(United States) Raquel Pennington	3
Women's Bantamweight	(Brazil) Ketlen Vieira	3
Women's Flyweight	(United States) Lauren Murphy	3
Women's Flyweight	(Scotland) Joanne Wood	3
Women's Strawweight	(United States) Carla Esparza	3

=== Most Decision bouts in one event ===
	Event	Date	Venue	City	Decisions
1	UFC 263	June 12, 2021	Gila River Arena	Glendale, Arizona, U.S.	11
1	UFC Fight Night 274	April 25, 2026	Meta Apex	Las Vegas, Nevada, U.S.	11
2	UFC 169	February 1, 2014	Prudential Center	Newark, New Jersey, U.S.	10
2	UFC Fight Night 36	February 15, 2014	Arena Jaraguá	Jaraguá do Sul, Brazil	10
2	UFC Fight Night 84	February 27, 2016	The O_{2} Arena	London, England	10
2	UFC Fight Night 121	November 19, 2017	Qudos Bank Arena	Sydney, Australia	10
2	UFC on ESPN 4	July 20, 2019	AT&T Center	San Antonio, Texas, U.S.	10
2	UFC on ESPN+ 56	November 20, 2021	UFC Apex	Las Vegas, Nevada, U.S.	10
2	UFC on ABC 8	June 21, 2025	Baku Crystal Hall	Baku, Azerbaijan	10

=== Most Split Decision bouts in one event ===
	Event	Date	Venue	City	Split Decisions
1	UFC Fight Night 79	November 28, 2015	Olympic Gymnastics Arena	Seoul, South Korea	5
1	UFC 222	March 3, 2018	T-Mobile Arena	Paradise, Nevada, U.S.	5
1	UFC 274	May 7, 2022	Footprint Center	Phoenix, Arizona, U.S.	5

=== Highest Decision wins per win percentage ===
	Fighter	Division	Dec.Wins	Wins	%
1	(Russia) Movsar Evloev	FLW	10	10	100.00%
2	(United States) Katlyn Cerminara	W-FW \ W-BW	11	12	91.67%
3	(United States) JJ Aldrich	W-FW	10	11	90.91%
3	(United States) Gray Maynard	FTW \ LW	10	11	90.91%
3	(Poland) Krzysztof Jotko	MW	10	11	90.91%
6	(Brazil) Ketlen Vieira	W-BW \ W-FTW	9	10	90.00%
7	(United States) Brad Tavares	MW	14	16	87.50%
8	(Georgia (country)) Merab Dvalishvili	BW	12	14	85.71%
9	(United States) Benson Henderson	LW \ WW	9	11	81.82%
10	(United States) Belal Muhammad	WW	12	15	80.00%

1.Minimum 10 UFC wins.

== Zuffa records ==
Zuffa, LLC includes several companies acquired by the promotion, such as the Ultimate Fighting Championship, Pride Fighting Championships (2007), World Extreme Cagefighting (2010) and Strikeforce (2013).

=== Most bouts under the Zuffa banner ===
**Bold** - Active UFC fighters

Updated as of November 14, 2026 after UFC 334.

	Fighter	Organizations	Bouts
1	(United States) **Jim Miller**	UFC	48
1	(United States) Donald Cerrone	UFC \ WEC	48
3	(Belarus) Andrei Arlovski	UFC \ Strikeforce	45
4	(Brazil) Wanderlei Silva	UFC \ Pride	40
4	(United States) Clay Guida	UFC \ Strikeforce \ WEC	40

=== Most wins under the Zuffa banner ===
Updated as of August 16, 2026 after UFC 330.

	Fighter	Organizations	Wins
1	(United States) Donald Cerrone	UFC \ WEC	29
2	(United States) **Jim Miller**	UFC	28
3	(Brazil) Wanderlei Silva	UFC \ Pride	27
4	(Brazil) **Charles Oliveira**	UFC	25
4	(United States) **Neil Magny**	UFC	25
4	(United States) Dan Henderson	UFC \ Pride \ Strikeforce	25

=== Most finishes under the Zuffa banner ===
Updated as of August 16, 2026 after UFC 330.

	Fighter	Organizations	Finishes
1	(Brazil) **Charles Oliveira**	UFC	21
1	(Croatia) Mirko Cro Cop	UFC \ Pride	21
3	(United States) **Jim Miller**	UFC	20
3	(Brazil) Wanderlei Silva	UFC \ Pride	20
3	(United States) Donald Cerrone	UFC \ WEC	20
6	(Brazil) Maurício Rua	UFC \ Pride	18

=== Most knockouts under the Zuffa banner ===
Updated as of October 8, 2016 after UFC 204.

	Fighter	Organizations	Knockouts
1	(Brazil) Wanderlei Silva	UFC \ Pride	19
2	(Croatia) Mirko Cro Cop	UFC \ Pride	18
3	(Brazil) Maurício Rua	UFC \ Pride	17
4	(United States) **Derrick Lewis**	UFC	16
5	(United States) Dan Henderson	UFC \ Pride \ Strikeforce	15

=== Most knockdowns under the Zuffa banner ===
Updated as of May 19, 2019 after UFC 204.

	Fighter	Organizations	Knockdowns
1	(Brazil) Wanderlei Silva	UFC \ Pride	27
2	(United States) Donald Cerrone	UFC \ WEC	25
3	(United States) Dan Henderson	UFC \ Pride \ Strikeforce	20
4	(Brazil) Anderson Silva	UFC \ Pride	19
4	(Brazil) Maurício Rua	UFC \ Pride	19
6	(United States) **Jeremy Stephens**	UFC	18
6	(Croatia) Mirko Cro Cop	UFC \ Pride	18

== Striking ==
=== Most significant strikes landed ===
==== Most significant strikes landed - Career ====
Updated to October 24, 2026 after UFC 333.

In any bout
	Fighter	Division	Strikes
1	(United States) Max Holloway	LW \ FTW	3693
2	(United States) Sean Strickland	MW \ WW	2430
3	(United States) Angela Hill	W-SW	2364
4	(United States) King Green	LW	2151
5	(Australia) Alexander Volkanovski	LW \ FTW	1871

In title bouts
	Fighter	Division	Strikes
1	(United States) Max Holloway	FTW \ LW	1414
2	(Poland) Joanna Jędrzejczyk	W-SW	1385
3	(United States) Jon Jones	LHW \ HW	1362
4	(Australia) Alexander Volkanovski	FTW \ LW	1344
5	(Canada) Georges St-Pierre	WW \ MW	999

==== Most significant strikes landed - In a single bout ====
Updated to July 18, 2026 (after UFC Fight Night: du Plessis vs. Usman).

In any bout
	Fighter	Opponent	Division	Event	Strikes
1	(United States) Max Holloway	(United States) Calvin Kattar	Featherweight	UFC on ABC: Holloway vs. Kattar	445
2	(United States) Max Holloway	(United States) Brian Ortega	Featherweight	UFC 231	290
3	(United States) Rob Font	(Ecuador) Marlon Vera	Bantamweight	UFC on ESPN: Font vs. Vera	271
4	(United States) Tommy McMillen	(Venezuela) Alberto Montes	Featherweight	UFC Fight Night: du Plessis vs. Usman	252
5	(United States) Jared Cannonier	(Italy) Marvin Vettori	Middleweight	UFC on ESPN: Vettori vs. Cannonier	241

In a title bout
	Fighter	Opponent	Division	Event	Strikes
1	(United States) Max Holloway	(United States) Brian Ortega	Featherweight	UFC 231	290
2	(United States) Jamahal Hill	(Brazil) Glover Teixeira	Light Heavyweight	UFC 283	232
3	(United States) Sean O'Malley	(Ecuador) Marlon Vera	Bantamweight	UFC 299	230
4	(Poland) Joanna Jędrzejczyk	(Brazil) Jéssica Andrade	Women's Strawweight	UFC 211	225
5	(Australia) Alexander Volkanovski	(United States) Brian Ortega	Featherweight	UFC 266	214

==== Most significant strikes landed - In a single event ====
Updated to December 3, 2022.

	Event	Date	Strikes
1	UFC 268	November 6, 2021	1973
2	UFC 238	June 8, 2019	1818
3	UFC 241	August 17, 2019	1717
4	UFC 271	February 12, 2022	1710
5	UFC on ESPN 42	December 3, 2022	1686

=== Highest significant strike percentage ===
	Fighter	Division	Landed	Attempted	%
1	(France) Ciryl Gane	HW	1220	1936	63.02%
2	(United States) Chidi Njokuani	WW / MW	633	1026	61.70%
3	(Brazil) Alex Pereira	MW \ LHW \ HW	697	1136	61.36%
4	(United States) Sean O'Malley	BW	1131	1875	60.32%
5	(United States) Randy Couture	LHW \ HW	778	1294	60.12%

2.Minimum 1000 significant strike attempts.

Updated to November 15, 2026

	Fighter	Division	Landed	Attempted	%
1	(Netherlands) Alistair Overeem	HW	715	962	74.32%
2	(France) Ciryl Gane	HW	1220	1936	63.02%
3	(Russia) Sharabutdin Magomedov	MW	488	775	63.00%
4	(United States) Chidi Njokuani	WW / MW	633	1026	61.70%
5	(United States) Josh Barnett	HW	392	637	61.54%

1.Minimum 5 UFC bouts and 500 significant strikes attempted.

=== Highest significant strikes landed per minute ===
Updated to September 19, 2026

	Fighter	Division	Strikes \ minute
1	(United States) Carli Judice	W-FLW	8.70
2	(Myanmar) Joshua Van	FLW	8.26
3	(United States) Terrance McKinney	LW	7.95
4	(England) Tom Aspinall	HW	7.63
5	(Australia) Casey O'Neill	W-FLW	7.60

1.Minimum 5 UFC bouts.

== Knockdowns ==
**Bold** - Active fighters

=== Most knockdowns - Career ===
Updated to July 19, 2025.

In any bout
	Fighter	Division	Knockdowns
1	(United States) Donald Cerrone	WW \ LW	20
2	(United States) **Jeremy Stephens**	LW \ FTW	18
2	(Brazil) Anderson Silva	LHW \ MW	18
4	(Ecuador) **Marlon Vera**	BW \ FW	16
4	(Brazil) Edson Barboza	FTW \ LW	16
6	(United States) Dustin Poirier	FW \ LW	15
6	(United States) **Khalil Rountree Jr.**	LHW	14
6	(United States) Chuck Liddell	LHW	14
6	(Brazil) Maurício Rua	LHW	14
6	(Brazil) Lyoto Machida	LHW \ MW	14
6	(Brazil) Junior dos Santos	HW	14
6	(Brazil) Thiago Santos	LHW	14

In title bouts
	Fighter	Division	Knockdowns
1	(Brazil) Anderson Silva	MW	10
2	(Nigeria) **Israel Adesanya**	MW	9
3	(Nigeria) **Kamaru Usman**	WW	7
3	(United States) Chuck Liddell	LHW	7
3	(Canada) Georges St-Pierre	WW \ MW	7

=== Most knockdowns - By division ===
Updated to October 3, 2026.

Division	Fighter	Knockdowns
Heavyweight	(Brazil) Junior dos Santos	14
Light Heavyweight	(United States) **Khalil Rountree Jr.**	14
Light Heavyweight	(United States) Chuck Liddell	14
Light Heavyweight	(Brazil) Maurício Rua	14
Middleweight	(Nigeria) **Israel Adesanya**	13
Middleweight	(Brazil) Anderson Silva	13
Welterweight	(Brazil) Thiago Alves	13
Lightweight	(United States) **Michael Johnson**	13
Lightweight	(United States) Melvin Guillard	13
Featherweight	(United States) **Josh Emmett**	12
Featherweight	(United States) Cub Swanson	12
Bantamweight	(Ecuador) **Marlon Vera**	14
Bantamweight	(United States) **Montel Jackson**	14
Flyweight	(Brazil) **Deiveson Figueiredo**	11
Women's Featherweight	(Brazil) **Josiane Nunes**	2
Women's Featherweight	(Brazil) **Amanda Nunes**	2
Women's Bantamweight	(Brazil) **Amanda Nunes**	6
Women's Flyweight	(United States) **Carli Judice**	3
Women's Flyweight	(Brazil) **Natália Silva**	3
Women's Flyweight	(Mexico) **Alexa Grasso**	3
Women's Flyweight	(Brazil) Ariane da Silva	3
Women's Flyweight	(Brazil) Taila Santos	3
Women's Strawweight	(Brazil) **Amanda Lemos**	6

=== Most knockdowns - In a single bout ===
Updated to July 26, 2025.

In any bout
	Fighter	Opponent	Division	Event	Knockdowns
1	(United States) **Steven Nguyen**	Mohammad Yahya	FTW	UFC on ABC 9	6
2	(United States) Jeremy Stephens	Gilbert Melendez	FTW	UFC 215	5
2	(United States) Forrest Petz	Sammy Morgan	WW	UFC Fight Night 6	5
4	(Nigeria) **Israel Adesanya**	**Kelvin Gastelum**	MW	UFC 236	4
4	(United States) Nate Marquardt	Dean Lister	MW	UFC Fight Night 8	4
4	(United States) Brad Blackburn	James Giboo	HW	UFC Fight Night 14	4
4	(United States) **Josh Emmett**	Felipe Arantes	FTW	UFC Fight Night 118	4
4	(United States) **Khalil Rountree Jr.**	**Eryk Anders**	LHW	UFC 236	4
4	(United States) **Montel Jackson**	JP Buys	BTW	UFC Fight Night 192	4
4	(United States) **Matt Frevola**	Genaro Valdéz	LW	UFC 270	4
4	(Brazil) **Jéssica Andrade**	Mackenzie Dern	W-SW	UFC 295	4

In title bouts
	Fighter	Opponent	Division	Event	Knockdowns
1	(Nigeria) **Israel Adesanya**	**Kelvin Gastelum**	MW	UFC 236	4
2	(Republic of Ireland) **Conor McGregor**	Eddie Alvarez	LW	UFC 205	3
2	(United States) Frank Mir	Antônio Rodrigo Nogueira	HW	UFC 92	3
2	(United States) Gray Maynard	Frankie Edgar	LW	UFC 125	3
2	(Brazil) Anderson Silva	Rich Franklin	MW	UFC 77	3
2	(Canada) Georges St-Pierre	Jon Fitch	WW	UFC 87	3
2	(Brazil) Lyoto Machida	Rashad Evans	LHW	UFC 98	3

=== Most knockdowns - In a single event ===
Updated to October 3, 2026.

	Event	Date	Knockdowns
1	UFC 332	October 3, 2026	16
2	UFC 199	June 4, 2016	15
2	UFC Fight Night 192	September 18, 2021	15
4	UFC Fight Night 126	February 18, 2018	13
5	UFC 160	May 25, 2013	12
5	UFC 215	September 9, 2017	12
5	UFC 230	November 3, 2018	12
5	UFC 271	February 12, 2022	12
5	UFC on ESPN 37	June 18, 2022	12
5	UFC 323	December 6, 2025	12

== Takedowns ==
=== Most Takedowns Landed - All fighters ===
Updated to October 25, 2026.

In any bout
	Fighter	Division	Takedowns
1	(Georgia (country)) Merab Dvalishvili	BW	124
2	(Canada) Georges St-Pierre	MW \ WW	90
3	(Brazil) Gleison Tibau	LW	84
4	(United States) Clay Guida	LW \ FTW	78
5	(United States) Demetrious Johnson	FW \ BW	74
6	(United States) Frankie Edgar	LW \ FTW	73
In title bouts
	Fighter	Division	Takedowns
1	(Canada) Georges St-Pierre	MW \ WW	69
2	(United States) Demetrious Johnson	BW \ FLW	57
3	(Kyrgyzstan) Valentina Shevchenko	W-FLW	52
4	(Georgia (country)) Merab Dvalishvili	BW	45
5	(United States) Jon Jones	LHW \ HW	30

=== Most Takedowns Landed - By division ===
Updated to November 14, 2026.

Division	Fighter	Takedowns
Heavyweight	(United States) Curtis Blaydes	70
Light Heavyweight	(United States) Tito Ortiz (Note: 8 of 58 Light Heavyweight takedowns in deprecated UFC Middleweight (171-199 lbs.) class (now known as Light Heavyweight) and 2 of 58 Light Heavyweight takedowns in first deprecated UFC Lightweight (< 199 lbs.) class (now known as Light Heavyweight))	58
Middleweight	(United States) Anthony Hernandez	57
Welterweight	(Canada) Georges St-Pierre	87
Lightweight	(Brazil) Gleison Tibau	84
Featherweight	(United States) Darren Elkins	65
Bantamweight	(Georgia (country)) Merab Dvalishvili	111
Flyweight	(United States) Tim Elliott	63
Women's Featherweight	(Brazil) Norma Dumont	9
Women's Bantamweight	(Brazil) Amanda Nunes	34
Women's Flyweight	(Kyrgyzstan) Valentina Shevchenko	54
Women's Strawweight	(United States) Carla Esparza	49

=== Most Takedowns Landed - In a single bout ===
Updated to March 15, 2026.

In any bout
	Fighter	Opponent	Division	Event	Rounds	Takedowns
1	(Russia) Khabib Nurmagomedov	Abel Trujillo	CW	UFC 160	3	21
2	(Georgia (country)) Merab Dvalishvili	Cory Sandhagen	BW	UFC 320	5	20
3	(Kyrgyzstan) Myktybek Orolbai	Chris Curtis	WW	UFC Fight Night 269	3	19
4	(United States) Sean Sherk	Hermes França	LW	UFC 73	5	16
4	(United States) Raul Rosas Jr.	Rob Font	BW	UFC 326	3	16
5	(United States) Demetrious Johnson	Kyoji Horiguchi	FLW	UFC 186	5	14
5	(United States) Curtis Blaydes	Alexander Volkov	HW	UFC on ESPN 11	5	14

In title bouts
	Fighter	Opponent	Division	Event	Rounds	Takedowns
1	(Georgia (country)) Merab Dvalishvili	Cory Sandhagen	BW	UFC 320	5	20
2	(United States) Sean Sherk	Hermes França	LW	UFC 73	5	16
3	(United States) Demetrious Johnson	Kyoji Horiguchi	FLW	UFC 186	5	14
4	(United States) Demetrious Johnson	John Moraga	FLW	UFC on Fox 8	5	12
4	(United Arab Emirates) Khamzat Chimaev	Dricus du Plessis	MW	UFC 319	5	12
6	(Canada) Georges St-Pierre	Dan Hardy	WW	UFC 111	5	11
6	(United States) Cain Velasquez	Junior dos Santos	HW	UFC 155	5	11

=== Most Takedowns Landed - In a single event ===
Updated to October 25, 2025.

	Event	Date	Takedowns
1	UFC 321	October 25, 2025	60
2	UFC Fight Night 221	March 11, 2023	59
3	UFC 171	March 15, 2014	55
4	UFC 299	March 9, 2024	54
5	UFC 94	January 31, 2009	49

=== Highest takedown accuracy ===
Updated to March 9, 2024.

	Fighter	Division	%
1	(Canada) Nordine Taleb	MW \ WW	76.2%
2	(Brazil) Taila Santos	W-FLW	75.0%
3	(United States) Robbie Lawler	MW \ WW	73.9%
4	(Canada) Georges St-Pierre	MW \ WW	73.8%
5	(Poland) Bartosz Fabinski	MW \ WW	70.6%

== Submission attempts ==
=== Submission attempts - Career ===
In any bout
	Fighter	Division	Attempts
1	(United States) Jim Miller	LW \ CW	52
2	(Brazil) Charles Oliveira	FTW \ LW	51
3	(United States) Chris Lytle	WW	31
4	(United States) Joe Lauzon	LW	29
5	(Brazil) Demian Maia	WW \ MW	27

In title bouts
	Fighter	Division	Attempts
1	(Canada) Georges St-Pierre	WW	13
2	(United States) Demetrious Johnson	FLW \ BW	12
3	(United States) Frank Shamrock	LHW	9 (Note: 8 of 9 Light Heavyweight title submission attempts in deprecated UFC Middleweight (171-199 lbs.) class (now known as Light Heavyweight) and 1 of 9 Light Heavyweight title submission attempts in first deprecated UFC Lightweight (< 199 lbs.) class (now known as Light Heavyweight))
4	(United States) Matt Hughes	WW	8
4	(United States) Ronda Rousey	W-BW	8

=== Submission attempts - In a single bout ===
In any bout
	Fighter	Opponent	Division	Event	Attempts
1	(United States) Cole Miller	Leonard Garcia	LW	UFC Fight Night 11	10
2	(Brazil) Hermes Franca	Rich Crunkilton	LW	UFC 42	9
3	(England) James Wilks	DaMarques Johnson	WW	TUF 9 Finale	8
3	(Canada) Ivan Salaverry	Andrei Semenov	MW	UFC 37	8
5	12 fighters	—	—	—	7

In a title bout
	Fighter	Opponent	Division	Event	Attempts
1	(Canada) Georges St-Pierre	Dan Hardy	WW	UFC 111	6
2	(Brazil) Deiveson Figueiredo	Joseph Benavidez	FLW	UFC Fight Night 172	4
2	(United States) Kenny Florian	Sean Sherk	LW	UFC 64	4
2	(United States) Frank Shamrock (Note: 4 of 4 Light Heavyweight title submission attempts in deprecated UFC Middleweight (171-199 lbs.) class (now known as Light Heavyweight))	John Lober	LHW	UFC Brazil	4
2	(United States) Dave Menne	Gil Castillo	WW	UFC 33	4

=== Highest submission attempt rate ===
	Fighter	Division	Submission attempts \ 5 minute round
1	(United States) Dustin Hazelett	LW \ WW	1.404
2	(Brazil) Royce Gracie	OW \ CW	1.282
3	(Brazil) Rousimar Palhares	WW \ MW	1.047
4	(Brazil) Renato Sobral	LHW \ HW	1.041
5	(Brazil) Charles Oliveira	FTW \ LW	0.807

1.Minimum 10 UFC bouts.

== Losses ==
Updated as of May 9, 2026 after UFC 328.

=== Most losses ===
In any bout
	Fighter	Division	Losses
1	(United States) Jeremy Stephens	FTW \ LW \ CW	20
2	(United States) Jim Miller	LW	19
2	(United States) Clay Guida	LW \ FTW	19
4	(Belarus) Andrei Arlovski	HW	18
5	(United States) Angela Hill	W-SW	16
5	(Brazil) Rafael dos Anjos	LW	16

=== Most consecutive losses ===
In any bout
	Fighter	Division	Consecutive losses
1	(Australia) Tai Tuivasa	HW	8
1	(United States) Tony Ferguson	LW \ WW	8
3	(United States) B.J. Penn	FTW \ LW \ WW	7
4	(Australia) Elvis Sinosic	LHW	6
4	(United States) Phil Baroni	WW \ MW	6
4	(Cuba) Héctor Lombard	WW \ MW	6
4	(United States) Andrea Lee	W-FLW	6
4	(United States) Vince Morales	BW	6

=== Most consecutive losses by a woman ===
In any bout
	Fighter	Division	Consecutive losses
1	(United States) Andrea Lee	W-FLW	6
2	(United States) Marion Reneau	W-BW	5
2	(Poland) Karolina Kowalkiewicz	W-SW	5
2	(United States) Cynthia Calvillo	W-FLW \ W-SW	5
2	(South Korea) Ji Yeon Kim	W-FLW \ W-BW	5
2	(United States) Michelle Waterson-Gomez	W-SW \ W-FLW	5
2	(Brazil) Istela Nunes	W-SW	5
2	(Brazil) Mayra Bueno Silva	W-BW \ W-FLW	5

=== Longest winless streak ===
In any bout
	Fighter	Division	Winless streak
1	(United States) Sam Alvey	MW \ LHW	9
2	(United States) Jeremy Stephens	FTW \ LW	8
2	(Australia) Tai Tuivasa	HW	8
2	(United States) B.J. Penn	FTW \ LW \ WW	8
2	(United States) Tony Ferguson	LW \ WW	8
6	(Cuba) Héctor Lombard	WW \ MW	7
6	(United States) Donald Cerrone	LW \ WW	7

== Championships ==
=== Most title reigns ===
	Fighter	Division	Reigns
1	(United States) Randy Couture	HW \ LHW	6 (5 undisputed, 1 interim)
2	(Canada) Georges St-Pierre	MW \ WW	4 (3 undisputed, 1 interim)
2	(United States) Jon Jones	HW \ LHW	4 (3 undisputed, 1 interim)
4	(Brazil) **Amanda Nunes**	W-BW \ W-FTW	3 (3 undisputed)
4	(Brazil) Alex Pereira	LHW \ MW	3 (3 undisputed)
4	(Mexico) Brandon Moreno	FLW	3 (2 undisputed, 1 interim)
4	(Nigeria) Israel Adesanya	MW	3 (2 undisputed, 1 interim)
4	(Republic of Ireland) Conor McGregor	LW \ FTW	3 (2 undisputed, 1 interim)
4	(Brazil) José Aldo	FTW	3 (2 undisputed, 1 interim)
4	(Russia) **Petr Yan**	BW	3 (2 undisputed, 1 interim)
4	(United States) **Justin Gaethje**	LW	3 (1 undisputed, 2 interim)

- **Bold** – Active reign.

=== Longest single title reigns ===
By number of Days
	Fighter	Division	Days
1	(Brazil) Anderson Silva	MW	2457
2	(United States) Demetrious Johnson	FLW	2142
3	(Canada) Georges St-Pierre	WW	2064
4	(Brazil) **Amanda Nunes**	W-BW	1981
5	(Brazil) José Aldo	FTW	1848

By number of Title Defenses
	Fighter	Division	Defenses
1	(United States) Demetrious Johnson	FLW	11
2	(Brazil) Anderson Silva	MW	10
3	(Canada) Georges St-Pierre	WW	9
4	(United States) Jon Jones	LHW	8
5	(Kyrgyzstan) Valentina Shevchenko	W-FLW	7
5	(Brazil) José Aldo	FTW	7

==== Longest single title reigns - By division ====
By number of Days
Division	Fighter	Days
HW	(United States) Cain Velasquez	896
LHW	(United States) Jon Jones	1501
MW	(Brazil) Anderson Silva	2457
WW	(Canada) Georges St-Pierre	2064
LW	(Russia) Khabib Nurmagomedov	1077
FTW	(Brazil) José Aldo	1848
BW	(United States) Dominick Cruz	1117
FLW	(United States) Demetrious Johnson	2142
W-FTW	(Brazil) Amanda Nunes	1634
W-BW	(Brazil) Amanda Nunes	1981
W-FLW	(Kyrgyzstan) Valentina Shevchenko	1547
W-SW	(Poland) Joanna Jędrzejczyk	966

By number of Title Defenses
Division	Fighter	Defenses
HW	(United States) Stipe Miocic	3
LHW	(United States) Jon Jones	8
MW	(Brazil) Anderson Silva	10
WW	(Canada) Georges St-Pierre	9
LW	(Russia) Islam Makhachev	4
FTW	(Brazil) José Aldo	7
BW	(Georgia (country)) Merab Dvalishvili	3
BW	(United States) Aljamain Sterling	3
FLW	(United States) Demetrious Johnson	11
W-FTW	(Brazil) Amanda Nunes	2
W-FTW	(Brazil) Cris Cyborg	2
W-BW	(United States) Ronda Rousey	6
W-FLW	(Kyrgyzstan) Valentina Shevchenko	7
W-SW	(Poland) Joanna Jędrzejczyk	5

- **Bold** – Active reign.

=== Longest combined title reigns ===
By number of Days
	Fighter	Division	Reigns	Days
1	(Brazil) Amanda Nunes	W-BW \ W-FTW	2 \ 1	3940
2	(United States) Jon Jones	HW \ LHW	1 \ 2	2937
3	(Brazil) Anderson Silva	MW	1	2457
4	(Kyrgyzstan) **Valentina Shevchenko**	W-FLW	2	2345
5	(Canada) Georges St-Pierre	MW \ WW	1 \ 2	2237
6	(United States) Demetrious Johnson	FLW	1	2142
7	(Australia) **Alexander Volkanovski**	FW	2	2050

By number of Title Defenses
	Fighter	Division	Reigns	Defenses
1	(United States) Jon Jones	LHW \ HW	2 \ 1	12
2	(United States) Demetrious Johnson	FLW	1	11
3	(Brazil) Anderson Silva	MW	1	10
4	(Kyrgyzstan) **Valentina Shevchenko**	W-FLW	2	9
4	(Canada) Georges St-Pierre	WW	2	9
6	(Brazil) Amanda Nunes	W-BW \ W-FTW	2 \ 1	8
7	(United States) Matt Hughes	WW	2	7
7	(Brazil) José Aldo	FTW	2	7
7	(Australia) **Alexander Volkanovski**	FTW	2	7
9	(United States) Ronda Rousey	W-BW	1	6

==== Longest combined title reigns - By division ====
By number of Days
Division	Fighter	Reigns	Days
Heavyweight	(United States) Stipe Miocic	2	1372
Light Heavyweight	(United States) Jon Jones	2	2098
Middleweight	(Brazil) Anderson Silva	1	2457
Welterweight	(Canada) Georges St-Pierre	2	2204
Lightweight	(Russia) Khabib Nurmagomedov	1	1077
Featherweight	(Australia) **Alexander Volkanovski**	2	2050
Bantamweight	(United States) Dominick Cruz	2	1465
Flyweight	(United States) Demetrious Johnson	1	2142
Women's Featherweight	(Brazil) Amanda Nunes	1	1634
Women's Bantamweight	(Brazil) Amanda Nunes	2	2306
Women's Flyweight	(Kyrgyzstan) **Valentina Shevchenko**	2	2345
Women's Strawweight	(Poland) Joanna Jędrzejczyk	1	966

By number of Title Defenses
Division	Fighter	Reigns	Defenses
Heavyweight	(United States) Stipe Miocic	2	4
Light Heavyweight	(United States) Jon Jones	2	11
Middleweight	(Brazil) Anderson Silva	1	10
Welterweight	(Canada) Georges St-Pierre	2	9
Lightweight	(Russia) Islam Makhachev	1	4
Featherweight	(Brazil) José Aldo	2	7
Featherweight	(Australia) **Alexander Volkanovski**	2	7
Bantamweight	(United States) Aljamain Sterling	1	3
Bantamweight	(Georgia (country)) Merab Dvalishvili	1	3
Bantamweight	(United States) Dominick Cruz	2	3
Bantamweight	(United States) T.J. Dillashaw	2	3
Flyweight	(United States) Demetrious Johnson	1	11
Women's Featherweight	(Brazil) Amanda Nunes	1	2
Women's Featherweight	(Brazil) Cris Cyborg	1	2
Women's Bantamweight	(United States) Ronda Rousey	1	6
Women's Bantamweight	(Brazil) Amanda Nunes	2	6
Women's Flyweight	(Kyrgyzstan) **Valentina Shevchenko**	2	9
Women's Strawweight	(Poland) Joanna Jędrzejczyk	1	5

- **Bold** - Active reign.

=== Most title bouts ===
	Fighter	Bouts	Division/s	Wins	Losses	Draws	No Contests
1	(United States) Jon Jones	17	HW \ LHW	16 (14 LHW, 2 HW)	0	0	1
2	(Canada) Georges St-Pierre	15	MW \ WW	13 (12 WW, 1 MW)	2 (2 WW)	0	0
2	(United States) Randy Couture	15	HW \ LHW	9 (6 HW, 3 LHW)	6 (3 HW, 3 LHW)	0	0
4	(United States) Demetrious Johnson	14	FLW \ BW	12 (12 FLW)	2 (1 BW, 1 FLW)	0	0
4	(Kyrgyzstan) **Valentina Shevchenko**	14	W-FLW	11 (11 W-FLW)	2 (1 W-BW, 1 W-FLW)	1 (1 W-FLW)	0
6	(Brazil) Anderson Silva	13	MW	11 (11 MW)	2 (2 MW)	0	0

- **Bold** – Active.

=== Youngest champions ===
	Fighter	Division	Won \ Awarded	Birthday	Age
1	(United States) Jon Jones	LHW	Mar 19, 2011	Jul 19, 1987	23 years, 243 days
2	(Myanmar) **Joshua Van**	FW	Dec 6, 2025	Oct 10, 2001	24 years, 57 days
3	(Brazil) José Aldo	FTW	Nov 20, 2010	Sept 9, 1986	24 years, 72 days^{2}
4	(United States) Josh Barnett	HW	Mar 22, 2002	Nov 10, 1977	24 years, 132 days
5	(Canada) Carlos Newton	WW	May 4, 2001	Aug 17, 1976	24 years, 260 days

2.José Aldo was awarded the Featherweight Championship at UFC 123 but did not fight in his first UFC bout until UFC 129, at which point he was 24 years and 233 days of age. Aldo successfully defended his title at UFC 129.

- **Bold** - Active reign.

=== Oldest champions ===
	Fighter	Division	Last Held	Birthday	Age
1	(United States) Randy Couture	HW	Nov 15, 2008	Jun 22, 1963	45 years, 147 days
2	(Brazil) Glover Teixeira	LHW	Jun 12, 2022	Oct 28, 1979	42 years, 227 days
3	(United States) Daniel Cormier	HW	Aug 17, 2019	Mar 20, 1979	40 years, 150 days
4	(Brazil) Fabrício Werdum	HW	May 14, 2016	Jul 30, 1977	38 years, 289 days
5	(England) Michael Bisping	MW	Nov 4, 2017	Feb 28, 1979	38 years, 249 days

- **Bold** - Active reign.

=== Multi-division champions ===
Fighters who have won championships in multiple weight classes. Tournament championships and The Ultimate Fighter winners are not included.

- Randy Couture was the first champion to hold titles in two different divisions.
- Conor McGregor was the first champion to hold two titles simultaneously.
- Daniel Cormier was the first champion to have successful title defenses in two different divisions.
- Amanda Nunes was the first champion to successfully defend two titles while holding them simultaneously.
- Ilia Topuria was the first champion to hold two titles while being undefeated.

Interim

	Champion	Division	Won	Lost	Defenses	Reign	Total reign
1	(United States) Randy Couture	Heavyweight	Dec 21, 1997 (UFC Japan)	Jan ?, 1998 (stripped)	0	? days	1,478 + ? days
1	(United States) Randy Couture	Heavyweight	Nov 17, 2000 (UFC 28)	Mar 22, 2002 (UFC 36)	2	490 days	1,478 + ? days
1	(United States) Randy Couture	Heavyweight	Mar 3, 2007 (UFC 68)	Nov 15, 2008 (UFC 91)	1	623 days	1,478 + ? days
1	(United States) Randy Couture	Light Heavyweight	Jun 6, 2003 (UFC 43)	Sep 26, 2003 (UFC 44)	0	-	1,478 + ? days
1	(United States) Randy Couture	Light Heavyweight	Sep 26, 2003 (UFC 44)	Jan 31, 2004 (UFC 46)	0	127 days	1,478 + ? days
1	(United States) Randy Couture	Light Heavyweight	Aug 21, 2004 (UFC 49)	Apr 16, 2005 (UFC 52)	0	238 days	1,478 + ? days
2	(United States) B.J. Penn	Welterweight	Jan 31, 2004 (UFC 46)	May 17, 2004 (stripped)	0	107 days	919 days
2	(United States) B.J. Penn	Lightweight	Jan 19, 2008 (UFC 80)	Apr 10, 2010 (UFC 112)	3	812 days	919 days
3	(Republic of Ireland) Conor McGregor	Featherweight	Jul 11, 2015 (UFC 189)	Dec 12, 2015 (UFC 194)	0	-	861 days
3	(Republic of Ireland) Conor McGregor	Featherweight	Dec 12, 2015 (UFC 194)	Nov 26, 2016 (stripped)	0	350 days	861 days
3	(Republic of Ireland) Conor McGregor	Lightweight	Nov 12, 2016 (UFC 205)	Apr 7, 2018 (stripped)	0	511 days	861 days
4	(Canada) Georges St-Pierre	Welterweight	Nov 18, 2006 (UFC 65)	Apr 7, 2007 (UFC 69)	0	140 days	2,237 days
4	(Canada) Georges St-Pierre	Welterweight	Dec 29, 2007 (UFC 79)	Apr 19, 2008 (UFC 83)	0	-	2,237 days
4	(Canada) Georges St-Pierre	Welterweight	Apr 19, 2008 (UFC 83)	Dec 13, 2013 (vacated)	9	2,064 days	2,237 days
4	(Canada) Georges St-Pierre	Middleweight	Nov 4, 2017 (UFC 217)	Dec 7, 2017 (vacated)	0	33 days	2,237 days
5	(United States) Daniel Cormier	Light Heavyweight	May 23, 2015 (UFC 187)	Dec 28, 2018 (vacated)	3	1,315 days	1,722 days
5	(United States) Daniel Cormier	Heavyweight	Jul 7, 2018 (UFC 226)	Aug 17, 2019 (UFC 241)	1	407 days	1,722 days
6	(Brazil) Amanda Nunes	Women's Bantamweight	Jul 9, 2016 (UFC 200)	Dec 11, 2021 (UFC 269)	5	1,981 days	3,940 days
6	(Brazil) Amanda Nunes	Women's Bantamweight	Jul 30, 2022 (UFC 277)	Jun 20, 2023 (vacated)	1	325 days	3,940 days
6	(Brazil) Amanda Nunes	Women's Featherweight	Dec 29, 2018 (UFC 232)	Jun 20, 2023 (vacated)	2	1,634 days	3,940 days
7	(United States) Henry Cejudo	Flyweight	Aug 4, 2018 (UFC 227)	Feb 29, 2020 (vacated)	1	574 days	926 days
7	(United States) Henry Cejudo	Bantamweight	Jun 8, 2019 (UFC 238)	May 24, 2020 (vacated)	1	352 days	926 days
8	(United States) Jon Jones	Light Heavyweight	Mar 19, 2011 (UFC 128)	Apr 28, 2015 (stripped)	8	1,501 days	2,938 days
8	(United States) Jon Jones	Light Heavyweight	Apr 23, 2016 (UFC 197)	Nov 19, 2016 (stripped)	0	-	2,938 days
8	(United States) Jon Jones	Light Heavyweight	Dec 29, 2018 (UFC 232)	Aug 17, 2020 (vacated)	3	597 days	2,938 days
8	(United States) Jon Jones	Heavyweight	Mar 4, 2023 (UFC 285)	Jun 21, 2025 (vacated)	1	840 days	2,938 days
9	(Brazil) Alex Pereira	Middleweight	Nov 12, 2022 (UFC 281)	Apr 8, 2023 (UFC 287)	0	147 days	819 days
9	(Brazil) Alex Pereira	Light Heavyweight	Nov 11, 2023 (UFC 295)	Mar 8, 2025 (UFC 313)	3	483 days	819 days
9	(Brazil) Alex Pereira	Light Heavyweight	Oct 4, 2025 (UFC 320)	Apr 11, 2026 (vacated)	0	189 days	819 days
10	(Georgia (country)) Ilia Topuria	Featherweight	Feb 17, 2024 (UFC 298)	Apr 12, 2025 (vacated)	1	419 days	770 days
10	(Georgia (country)) Ilia Topuria	Lightweight	Jun 28, 2025 (UFC 317)	Jun 14, 2026 (UFC Freedom 250)	0	351 days	770 days
11	(Russia) **Islam Makhachev**	Lightweight	Oct 22, 2022 (UFC 280)	Jun 28, 2025 (vacated)	4	980 days	1,351 days
11	(Russia) **Islam Makhachev**	Welterweight	Nov 15, 2025 (UFC 322)	Incumbent	1	371 days	1,351 days

=== Simultaneous two division champions ===
- Note: Defenses shown are while champion was a two division champion.

	Champion	Division	Period	Defenses	Reign
1	(Republic of Ireland) Conor McGregor	Featherweight	Nov 12, 2016 – Nov 26, 2016	0	14 days
1	(Republic of Ireland) Conor McGregor	Lightweight	Nov 12, 2016 – Nov 26, 2016	0	14 days
2	(United States) Daniel Cormier	Light Heavyweight	Jul 7, 2018 – Dec 28, 2018	0	174 days
2	(United States) Daniel Cormier	Heavyweight	Jul 7, 2018 – Dec 28, 2018	1	174 days
3	(Brazil) Amanda Nunes	Women's Bantamweight	Dec 29, 2018 – Dec 11, 2021	2	1,078 days
3	(Brazil) Amanda Nunes	Women's Featherweight	Dec 29, 2018 – Dec 11, 2021	2	1,078 days
4	(United States) Henry Cejudo	Flyweight	Jun 8, 2019 – Feb 29, 2020	0	266 days
4	(United States) Henry Cejudo	Bantamweight	Jun 8, 2019 – Feb 29, 2020	0	266 days
5	(Brazil) Amanda Nunes (2)	Women's Featherweight	Jul 30, 2022 – Jun 20, 2023	0	325 days
5	(Brazil) Amanda Nunes (2)	Women's Bantamweight	Jul 30, 2022 – Jun 20, 2023	1	325 days

- **Bold** - Active reigns.

== Tournaments ==
=== Multiple tournament wins ===
	Fighter	Tournaments	Won
1	(Brazil) Royce Gracie	UFC 1, UFC 2, UFC 4	3
2	(United States) Dan Severn	UFC 5, The Ultimate Ultimate	2
2	(United States) Don Frye	UFC 8, The Ultimate Ultimate 2	2
2	(United States) Mark Coleman	UFC 10, UFC 11	2
2	(United States) Mark Kerr	UFC 14, UFC 15	2

== Pound-for-pound ==
=== Men's Pound-for-pound reigns ===
Men's Pound-for-pound rankings were first introduced by the UFC on February 5, 2013. In June 2026, the promotion began replacing that system with the Meta UFC Rankings, which will eventually remove the pound‑for‑pound rankings.

Updated as of November 17, 2026.

Fighter	Start date	Days	Times (Note: Denotes the number of times a fighter has appeared as number one pound-for-pound in ranking updates.)
(Brazil) Anderson Silva	Feb 5 2013	155	11
(United States) Jon Jones	Jul 9 2013	659	64
(Brazil) José Aldo	Apr 29 2015	229	22
(United States) Demetrious Johnson	Dec 14 2015	21	2
(United States) Jon Jones	Jan 4 2016	189	16
(United States) Demetrious Johnson	Jul 11 2016	387	40
(United States) Jon Jones	Aug 2 2017	33	2
(United States) Demetrious Johnson	Sep 4 2017	310	33
(United States) Daniel Cormier	Jul 11 2018	418	36
(United States) Jon Jones	Sep 2 2019	420	44
(Russia) Khabib Nurmagomedov	Oct 26 2020	148	17
(United States) Jon Jones	Mar 23 2021	195	23
(Nigeria) Kamaru Usman	Oct 4 2021	322	36
(Australia) Alexander Volkanovski	Aug 22 2022	194	18
(United States) Jon Jones	Mar 7 2023	245	30
(Australia) Alexander Volkanovski	Jul 11 2023	40	7
(Russia) Islam Makhachev	Nov 7 2023	602	68
(Georgia (country)) Ilia Topuria	Jul 1 2025	139	17
**(Russia) Islam Makhachev**	**Nov 18 2025**	**368**	**44**

Bold - Active reign.

=== Men's longest combined pound-for-pound reign ===
Updated as of November 17, 2026.

Fighter	Days	Times (Note: Denotes the number of times a fighter has appeared as number one pound-for-pound in ranking updates.)	Reigns
(United States) Jon Jones	1,743	165	6
(Russia) **Islam Makhachev**	**970**	**112**	**2**
(United States) Demetrious Johnson	718	75	3
(United States) Daniel Cormier	418	36	1
(Nigeria) Kamaru Usman	322	36	1
(Australia) Alexander Volkanovski	237	26	2
(Brazil) José Aldo	229	22	1
(Brazil) Anderson Silva	155	11	1
(Russia) Khabib Nurmagomedov	148	17	1
(Georgia (country)) Ilia Topuria	139	17	1

Bold - Active reign.

=== Women's Pound-for-pound reigns ===
Women's Pound-for-pound rankings were first introduced by the UFC on January 27, 2020.

Updated as of November 17, 2026.

Fighter	Start date	Days	Times (Note: Denotes the number of times a fighter has appeared as number one pound-for-pound in ranking updates.)
(Brazil) Amanda Nunes	Jan 27 2020	686	80
(Kyrgyzstan) Valentina Shevchenko	Dec 13 2021	231	27
(Brazil) Amanda Nunes	Aug 1 2022	323	36
(Mexico) Alexa Grasso	Jun 20 2023	454	53
(Kyrgyzstan) Valentina Shevchenko	Sep 17 2024	791	93
**(United States) Kayla Harrison**	**Nov 17 2026**	**4**	**1**

Bold - Active reign.

=== Women's Longest combined pound-for-pound reign ===
Updated as of November 17, 2026.

Fighter	Days	Times (Note: Denotes the number of times a fighter has appeared as number one pound-for-pound in ranking updates.)	Reigns
(Kyrgyzstan) Valentina Shevchenko	1022	120	2
(Brazil) Amanda Nunes	1009	116	2
(Mexico) Alexa Grasso	454	53	1
**(United States) Kayla Harrison**	**4**	**1**	**1**

Bold - Active reign.

== Bonuses ==
=== Most overall ===
Updated as of June 14, 2026 after UFC Freedom 250.

	Fighter	No. of bonuses
1	(Brazil) Charles Oliveira	21
2	(United States) Donald Cerrone	18
3	(United States) Justin Gaethje	17
4	(United States) Jim Miller	16
4	(United States) Nate Diaz	16
6	(United States) Joe Lauzon	15
6	(United States) Dustin Poirier	15
8	(Brazil) Anderson Silva	14

=== Most Performance of the Night bonuses ===
Updated to August 29, 2026 after (after UFC Fight Night: Nurmagomedov vs. Song).

	Fighter	POTN bonuses
1	(Brazil) Charles Oliveira	14
2	(United States) Kevin Holland	9
3	(Scotland) Paul Craig	8
4	(Republic of Ireland) Conor McGregor	7
4	(England) Tom Aspinall	7
4	(Brazil) Carlos Prates	7
4	(China) Song Yadong	7
4	(United States) Donald Cerrone	7
4	(United States) Ovince Saint Preux	7

=== Most Fight of the Night bonuses ===
Updated to June 14, 2026 (after UFC Freedom 250).

	Fighter	FOTN bonuses
1	(United States) Justin Gaethje	11
2	(Brazil) Edson Barboza	10
2	(United States) Dustin Poirier	10
4	(United States) Nate Diaz	8
4	(United States) Frankie Edgar	8
4	(United States) Cub Swanson	8
7	(United States) Jim Miller	7
7	(United States) Max Holloway	7
7	(United States) Diego Sanchez	7
7	(United States) Joe Lauzon	7

=== Most Knockout of the Night bonuses (discontinued) ===
	Fighter	KOTN bonuses
1	(Brazil) Anderson Silva	7
2	(Brazil) Vitor Belfort	5
3	(United States) Chris Leben	4
3	(Brazil) Lyoto Machida	4
3	(United States) Roy Nelson	4

=== Most Submission of the Night bonuses (discontinued) ===
	Fighter	SOTN bonuses
1	(United States) Joe Lauzon	6
2	(United States) Nate Diaz	5
3	(Brazil) Demian Maia	4
3	(United States) Cole Miller	4
5	(United States) Jim Miller	3
5	(Brazil) Charles Oliveira	3
5	(United States) Chris Lytle	3
5	(United States) Clay Guida	3

== Attendances ==
=== Overall ===
	Event	Main event	Date	Venue	City	Attendance
1	UFC 243	Whittaker (c) vs. Adesanya (ic)	Oct 6, 2019	Marvel Stadium	Melbourne, Victoria, Australia	57,127
2	UFC 193	Rousey (c) vs. Holm	Nov 14, 2015	Marvel Stadium	Melbourne, Victoria, Australia	56,214
3	UFC 129	St-Pierre (c) vs. Shields	Apr 30, 2011	Rogers Centre	Toronto, Ontario, Canada	55,724
4	UFC 198	Werdum (c) vs. Miocic	May 14, 2016	Arena da Baixada	Curitiba, Brazil	45,207
5	UFC on Fox 14	Gustafsson vs. Johnson	Jan 24, 2015	Tele2 Arena	Stockholm, Sweden	30,000

=== United States ===
	Event	Main event	Date	Venue	City	Attendance
1	UFC 281	Adesanya (c) vs. Pereira 1	Nov 12, 2022	Madison Square Garden	(United States) New York City, New York	20,845
2	UFC 268	Usman (c) vs. Covington 2	Nov 6, 2021	Madison Square Garden	(United States) New York City, New York	20,715
3	UFC 322	Della Maddalena (c) vs. Makhachev	Nov 16, 2025	Madison Square Garden	(United States) New York City, New York	20,664
4	UFC 205	Alvarez (c) vs. McGregor	Nov 12, 2016	Madison Square Garden	(United States) New York City, New York	20,427
5	UFC 309	Jones vs. Miocic	Nov 16, 2024	Madison Square Garden	(United States) New York City, New York	20,200

== Finances ==
This category only scores pay-per-view buys from The Ultimate Fighting Championship event held in Denver, CO (1993) to UFC 235. The UFC's 2019 contract with ESPN+ mandates a subscription to the over-the-top service which is the exclusive distributor of UFC pay-per-views in the United States in order to purchase the event. UFC and ESPN do not report on pay-per-view buys starting with UFC 236.

=== Highest Pay-Per-View buys ===
	Event	Main event	Date	Venue	City	PPV Buys
1	UFC 229	Khabib (c) vs. McGregor	Oct 6, 2018	T-Mobile Arena	(United States) Las Vegas, Nevada, U.S.	2,400,000
2	UFC 264	Poirier vs. McGregor 3	July 10, 2021	T-Mobile Arena	(United States) Las Vegas, Nevada, U.S.	1,800,000
3	UFC 202	Diaz vs. McGregor 2	Aug 20, 2016	T-Mobile Arena	(United States) Las Vegas, Nevada, U.S.	1,650,000
4	UFC 257	Poirier vs. McGregor 2	Jan 24, 2021	Etihad Arena	Abu Dhabi, United Arab Emirates	1,600,000
5	UFC 100	Lesnar vs. Mir 2	July 11, 2009	Mandalay Bay Events Center	(United States) Las Vegas, Nevada, U.S.	1,600,000

=== Highest Pay-Per-View buys for a non-championship main event ===
	Event	Main event	Date	Venue	City	PPV Buys
1	UFC 264	Poirier vs. McGregor 3	July 10, 2021	T-Mobile Arena	(United States) Las Vegas, Nevada, U.S.	1,800,000
2	UFC 202	Diaz vs. McGregor 2	Aug 20, 2016	T-Mobile Arena	(United States) Las Vegas, Nevada, U.S.	1,650,000
3	UFC 257	Poirier vs. McGregor 2	Jan 24, 2021	Etihad Arena	Abu Dhabi, United Arab Emirates	1,600,000
4	UFC 246	McGregor vs. Cowboy	Jan 18, 2020	T-Mobile Arena	(United States) Las Vegas, Nevada, U.S.	1,350,000
5	UFC 196	McGregor vs. Diaz	Mar 5, 2016	MGM Grand Garden Arena	(United States) Las Vegas, Nevada, U.S.	1,317,000

=== Lowest Pay-Per-View buys for a championship main event ===
UFC 1–100
	Event	Date	Main event	PPV Buys
1	UFC 42	Apr 25, 2003	Hughes (c) vs. Sherk	35,000
1	UFC 35	Jan 11, 2002	Pulver (c) vs. Penn	35,000
3	UFC 45	Nov 21, 2003	Hughes (c) vs. Trigg	40,000
4	UFC 39	Sep 27, 2002	Couture vs. Rodriguez	45,000
4	UFC 38	Jul 13, 2002	Hughes (c) vs. Newton	45,000
UFC 101–200
	Event	Date	Main event	PPV Buys
1	UFC 174	Jun 14, 2014	Johnson (c) vs. Bagautinov	115,000
1	UFC 191	Sep 5, 2015	Johnson (c) vs. Dodson	115,000
3	UFC 177	Aug 30, 2014	Dillashaw (c) vs. Soto	125,000
3	UFC 186	Apr 25, 2015	Johnson (c) vs. Horiguchi	125,000
5	UFC 179	Oct 25, 2014	Aldo (c) vs. Mendes	180,000
UFC 201–235
	Event	Date	Main event	PPV Buys
1	UFC 224	May 12, 2018	Nunes (c) vs. Pennington	85,000
2	UFC 215	Sep 9, 2017	Nunes (c) vs. Shevchenko	100,000
3	UFC 228	Sep 8, 2018	Woodley (c) vs. Till	130,000
4	UFC 212	Jun 3, 2017	Aldo (c) vs. Holloway (ic)	167,000
5	UFC 234	Feb 10, 2019	Adesanya vs. Silva	175,000

NOTE: Starting with UFC 236, all pay-per-views in the United States are iPPV events where an ESPN+ subscription is required. Neither UFC nor ESPN report PPV buys with the new format.

=== Biggest gates ===
Updated as of July 11, 2026 after UFC 329.

	Event	Main event	Date	Venue	City	Gate	Inflation Adjusted
1	UFC 329	McGregor vs. Holloway 2	July 11, 2026	T-Mobile Arena	(United States) Paradise, Nevada, U.S.	$26,430,566	$26,430,566
2	UFC 306	O'Malley (c) vs. Dvalishvili	Sep 14, 2024	Sphere	(United States) Paradise, Nevada, U.S.	$21,829,245	$23,320,811
3	UFC 205	Alvarez (c) vs. McGregor	Nov 12, 2016	Madison Square Garden	(United States) New York City, New York U.S.	$17,700,000	$24,714,600
4	UFC 229	Khabib (c) vs. McGregor	Oct 6, 2018	T-Mobile Arena	(United States) Paradise, Nevada, U.S.	$17,188,894	$22,939,997
5	UFC 309	Jones (c) vs. Miocic	Nov 16, 2024	Madison Square Garden	(United States) New York City, New York U.S.	$16,673,954	$17,813,266

== See also ==
- List of MMA records
- List of Pride Fighting Championships records
