= Brandon Royval =

American mixed martial artist (born 1992)

- Born: Brandon Matthew Royval; August 16, 1992 (age 34); Denver, Colorado, U.S.
- Other names: Raw Dawg
- Height: 5 ft 9 in (175 cm)
- Weight: 125 lb (57 kg; 8 st 13 lb)
- Division: Flyweight
- Reach: 68 in (173 cm)
- Fighting out of: Englewood, Colorado, U.S.
- Team: Factory X
- Rank: Black belt in Brazilian jiu-jitsu under Mario "Busy" Correa
- Years active: 2012–present

Mixed martial arts record
- Total: 27
- Wins: 18
- By knockout: 4
- By submission: 10
- By decision: 4
- Losses: 9
- By knockout: 2
- By submission: 1
- By decision: 6

Other information
- Mixed martial arts record from Sherdog

Brandon Matthew Royval (born August 16, 1992) is an American professional mixed martial artist. He currently competes in the Flyweight division of the Ultimate Fighting Championship (UFC). A professional since 2012, Royval has also formerly competed for Legacy Fighting Alliance, where he is a former Legacy Fighting Alliance Flyweight Champion. As of July 11, 2026, he is #3 in the Meta UFC flyweight rankings.

== Background ==
Born and raised in Denver, Brandon was already training Brazilian jiu-jitsu and Muay Thai at the age of 15. Royval has an older brother, Darian.

== Mixed martial arts career ==
=== Early career ===
Royval took his first amateur bout at the age of 18, racking up a 5–0 record. Starting his professional career in 2012, Royval compiled an 8–3 record fighting mostly for Legacy Fighting Alliance, eventually culminating in a shot for the interim LFA Flyweight Championship against Casey Kenney, which he lost by unanimous decision.

Brandon Royval next faced UFC vet, Joby Sanchez at LFA 65 on May 3, 2019, winning the bout via submission due to an armbar in the first round.

Royval was going to face Jared Scoggins for the vacant LFA flyweight title on November 22, 2019 until Scoggins pulled out of the fight. Nate Williams stepped up as a replacement and Royval won the LFA Flyweight title via first round armbar.

=== Ultimate Fighting Championship ===
Brandon made his UFC debut on May 30, 2020 at UFC on ESPN 9 against Tim Elliott. He won the fight via submission in the second round. This fight earned Royval a Fight of the Night award.

Royval faced Kai Kara-France on September 27, 2020 at UFC 253. After both fighters being knocked down in the first round, Royval won the fight via submission in the second round. This fight earned him the Fight of the Night award.

Royval was a replacement for Alex Perez against Brandon Moreno on November 21, 2020 at UFC 255. He lost the fight via technical knockout on round one.

Royval faced Alexandre Pantoja on August 21, 2021 UFC on ESPN 29. He lost the fight via rear-naked choke in round two.

=== Rise to title contention ===
Royval faced Rogério Bontorin on January 15, 2022 at UFC on ESPN 32. He won the fight via split decision.

Royval faced Matt Schnell on May 7, 2022 at UFC 274. He won the back-and-forth fight via a guillotine choke submission in the first round. The fight also won both men the Fight of the Night bonus award.

Royval was scheduled to face Askar Askarov on October 15, 2022 at UFC Fight Night 212. However the bout was cancelled the day before the event due to weight management issues.

Royval was set to face Amir Albazi at UFC Fight Night 216 on December 17, 2022. However, Royval pulled out of the bout in late November due to a broken wrist.

Royval faced Matheus Nicolau on April 15, 2023 at UFC on ESPN 44. He won the fight via knockout in the first round. This win earned him the Performance of the Night award.

Royval had a rematch with Alexandre Pantoja for the UFC Flyweight Championship title on December 16, 2023, at UFC 296. He lost the fight via unanimous decision.

=== Post title shot ===
Royval faced former UFC Flyweight Champion Brandon Moreno in a rematch, replacing Amir Albazi, at UFC Fight Night 237 on February 24, 2024. He won the fight via split decision. 13 out of 18 media outlets scored the bout for Royval.

As the last bout of his prevailing contract, Royval faced former Shooto Flyweight Champion Tatsuro Taira on October 12, 2024 in the main event at UFC Fight Night 244. He won the fight by split decision. This fight earned him another Fight of the Night award.

Royval was scheduled to face former RIZIN Bantamweight Champion Manel Kape on March 1, 2025 in the main event at UFC Fight Night 253. However, due to multiple concussions, Royval pulled out of the fight. The bout was rescheduled to take place on June 28, 2025 at UFC 317. However, Kape pulled out due to a fractured foot and was replaced by Joshua Van. Royval lost the fight by unanimous decision. This fight earned him another Fight of the Night award. Royval and Van landed a total of 419 significant strikes, which broke the record for most significant strikes landed in a three-round UFC fight and flyweight bout.

Royval was re-scheduled for the third time to face Manel Kape, which eventually took place on December 13, 2025, at UFC on ESPN 73. He lost the fight via knockout in round one.

Royval faced Lone'er Kavanagh on July 11, 2026 at UFC 329. He won the fight via a rear-naked choke submission in the third round. This fight earned him a $100,000 Fight of the Night award.

== Personal life ==
Royval grew up in a Mexican family. After his win against Kai Kara-France, Royval left his full-time job in the juvenile justice system. He also worked as the jiu-jitsu instructor at Factory X.

== Championships and accomplishments ==
- Ultimate Fighting Championship
  - Fight of the Night (Six times) vs. Tim Elliott, Kai Kara-France, Matt Schnell, Tatsuro Taira, Joshua Van and Lone'er Kavanagh
    - Most Fight of the Night bonuses in UFC Flyweight division history (6)
  - Performance of the Night (One time) vs. Matheus Nicolau
    - Tied (Brandon Moreno & Alexandre Pantoja) for second most Post-Fight bonuses in UFC Flyweight division history (7) (behind Demetrious Johnson)
  - Tied (Muhammad Mokaev) for third most submissions in UFC Flyweight division history (4)
  - Sixth most significant strikes landed in UFC Flyweight division history (852)
    - Sixth most total strikes landed in UFC Flyweight division history (1241)
  - Second most significant strikes landed-per-minute in UFC Flyweight division history (5.6)
  - Tied (Demetrious Johnson & John Moraga) for fifth most submission attempts in UFC Flyweight division history (12)
  - UFC Honors Awards
    - 2025: President's Choice Fight of the Year Winner vs. Joshua Van
  - UFC.com Awards
    - 2020: Ranked #3 Newcomer of the Year & Ranked #10 Upset of the Year vs. Tim Elliott
    - 2024: Ranked #7 Fight of the Year vs. Tatsuro Taira
    - 2025: Fight of the Year vs. Joshua Van & Half-Year Awards: Best Fight of the 1HY vs. Joshua Van
- Legacy Fighting Alliance
  - Legacy Fighting Alliance Flyweight Champion (One time)
- World MMA Awards
  - July 1, 2024 – December 31, 2025 Fight of the Year vs. Joshua Van at UFC 317
- ESPN
  - 2025 Fight of the Year vs. Joshua Van at UFC 317
- Sherdog
  - 2025 Fight of the Year vs. Joshua Van at UFC 317
- CBS Sports
  - 2025 UFC Fight of the Year vs. Joshua Van
- theScore
  - 2025 Fight of the Year vs. Joshua Van
- The Wrightway Sports Network
  - 2025 Fight of the Year vs. Joshua Van at UFC 317
- MMA Mania
  - 2025 #4 Ranked Fight of the Year vs. Joshua Van
- MMA Fighting
  - 2024 Third Team MMA All-Star
  - 2025 Fight of the Year vs. Joshua Van
- MMA Junkie
  - 2025 Fight of the Year vs. Joshua Van at UFC 317
- Cageside Press
  - 2025 Fight of the Year vs. Joshua Van, tied with Prochazka vs. Rountree Jr.
- UFC Flyweight Bout Records
  - Most significant strikes landed (215) (vs. Joshua Van)
  - Most significant strikes attempted (510) (vs. Brandon Moreno 2)
    - Second most significant strikes attempted (467) (vs. Joshua Van)
  - Most distant strikes landed (205) (vs. Joshua Van)
  - Most significant head strikes landed (179) (vs. Joshua Van)
  - Most total strikes landed (281) (vs. Alexandre Pantoja 2)
    - Fourth most total strikes landed (216) (vs. Joshua Van)
  - Most total strikes attempted (556) (vs. Brandon Moreno 2)
    - Second most total strikes attempted (468) (vs. Joshua Van)
    - Fourth most total strikes attempted (390) (vs. Alexandre Pantoja 2)
  - Second most total ground strikes landed (176) (vs. Alexandre Pantoja 2)
  - Most total head strikes landed (248) (vs. Alexandre Pantoja 2)
    - Fourth most total head strikes landed (180) (vs. Joshua Van)
- UFC Flyweight Round Records
  - Second most significant strikes landed in a round (87 in R2 vs. Joshua Van)
    - Third most significant strikes landed in a round (86 in R3 vs. Joshua Van)
  - Second most significant strikes attempted in a round (177 in R3 vs. Joshua Van)
    - Third most significant strikes attempted in a round (174 in R2 vs. Joshua Van)
    - Fifth most significant strikes attempted in a round (164 in R4 vs. Brandon Moreno 2)
  - Second most total strikes attempted in a round (179 in R4 vs. Brandon Moreno 2)
  - Third most total strikes attempted in a round (178 in R3 vs. Joshua Van)
  - Fourth most total strikes attempted in a round (174 in R2 vs. Joshua Van)
- UFC Striking Bout Records
  - Fifth most significant strikes attempted in a UFC bout (510) (vs. Brandon Moreno 2)
  - Third most total strikes attempted in a UFC bout (556) (vs. Brandon Moreno 2)

== Mixed martial arts record ==
Professional record breakdown
27 matches	18 wins	9 losses
By knockout	4	2
By submission	10	1
By decision	4	6

Res.	Record	Opponent	Method	Event	Date	Round	Time	Location	Notes
Win	18–9	Lone'er Kavanagh	Submission (rear-naked choke)	UFC 329	July 11, 2026	3	3:40	Las Vegas, Nevada, United States	Fight of the Night.
Loss	17–9	Manel Kape	KO (punches)	UFC on ESPN: Royval vs. Kape	December 13, 2025	1	3:18	Las Vegas, Nevada, United States	
Loss	17–8	Joshua Van	Decision (unanimous)	UFC 317	June 28, 2025	3	5:00	Las Vegas, Nevada, United States	Fight of the Night.
Win	17–7	Tatsuro Taira	Decision (split)	UFC Fight Night: Royval vs. Taira	October 12, 2024	5	5:00	Las Vegas, Nevada, United States	Fight of the Night.
Win	16–7	Brandon Moreno	Decision (split)	UFC Fight Night: Moreno vs. Royval 2	February 24, 2024	5	5:00	Mexico City, Mexico	
Loss	15–7	Alexandre Pantoja	Decision (unanimous)	UFC 296	December 16, 2023	5	5:00	Las Vegas, Nevada, United States	For the UFC Flyweight Championship.
Win	15–6	Matheus Nicolau	KO (knee and elbows)	UFC on ESPN: Holloway vs. Allen	April 15, 2023	1	2:09	Kansas City, Missouri, United States	Performance of the Night.
Win	14–6	Matt Schnell	Submission (guillotine choke)	UFC 274	May 7, 2022	1	2:14	Phoenix, Arizona, United States	Fight of the Night.
Win	13–6	Rogério Bontorin	Decision (split)	UFC on ESPN: Kattar vs. Chikadze	January 15, 2022	3	5:00	Las Vegas, Nevada, United States	
Loss	12–6	Alexandre Pantoja	Submission (rear-naked choke)	UFC on ESPN: Cannonier vs. Gastelum	August 21, 2021	2	1:46	Las Vegas, Nevada, United States	
Loss	12–5	Brandon Moreno	TKO (punches)	UFC 255	November 21, 2020	1	4:59	Las Vegas, Nevada, United States	
Win	12–4	Kai Kara-France	Submission (guillotine choke)	UFC 253	September 27, 2020	2	0:48	Abu Dhabi, United Arab Emirates	Fight of the Night.
Win	11–4	Tim Elliott	Submission (arm-triangle choke)	UFC on ESPN: Woodley vs. Burns	May 30, 2020	2	3:18	Las Vegas, Nevada, United States	Fight of the Night.
Win	10–4	Nate Williams	Submission (armbar)	LFA 79	November 22, 2019	1	0:23	Broomfield, Colorado, United States	Won the vacant LFA Flyweight Championship.
Win	9–4	Joby Sanchez	Submission (armbar)	LFA 65	May 3, 2019	1	3:17	Vail, Colorado, United States	
Loss	8–4	Casey Kenney	Decision (unanimous)	LFA 53	November 9, 2018	5	5:00	Phoenix, Arizona, United States	For the interim LFA Flyweight Championship.
Win	8–3	Charles Johnson	Decision (unanimous)	LFA 48	September 7, 2018	3	5:00	Kearney, Nebraska, United States	
Win	7–3	Jerome Rivera	TKO (arm injury)	LFA 39	May 4, 2018	1	0:40	Vail, Colorado, United States	
Win	6–3	Demetrius Wilson	Submission (triangle choke)	LFA 22	September 8, 2017	2	2:00	Broomfield, Colorado, United States	
Loss	5–3	Nick Urso	Decision (split)	LFA 10	April 21, 2017	3	5:00	Pueblo, Colorado, United States	
Win	5–2	Rakan Adwan	Submission (armbar)	LFA 5	February 24, 2017	1	1:54	Broomfield, Colorado, United States	
Win	4–2	Angel Torres	Submission (triangle choke)	Sparta Combat League 53	October 15, 2016	1	0:34	Denver, Colorado, United States	Flyweight debut.
Loss	3–2	Ricky Palacios	Decision (unanimous)	Combate Americas: Road to the Championship 5	May 26, 2016	3	5:00	Los Angeles, California, United States	
Win	3–1	Danny Mainus	KO (knee)	WSOF 29	March 12, 2016	1	2:48	Greeley, Colorado, United States	
Win	2–1	Joey Welch	Submission (triangle choke)	Sparta Combat League: Mile High Mayhem	August 23, 2014	1	0:51	Denver, Colorado, United States	
Loss	1–1	Ben VomBaur	Decision (unanimous)	Kick Down MMA 104: BOOM	October 19, 2012	3	5:00	Denver, Colorado, United States	Bantamweight debut.
Win	1–0	Sammy Rind	TKO (elbows)	Kick Down MMA 102: Rebels	August 17, 2012	1	1:45	Denver, Colorado, United States	Catchweight (140 lb) bout.

== See also ==
- List of current UFC fighters
- List of male mixed martial artists

Awards
Preceded by Max Holloway vs. Justin Gaethje	World MMA Fight of the Year; July 1, 2024 – December 31, 2025 vs. Joshua Van at UFC 317	Incumbent
