= UFC 317 =

UFC mixed martial arts event in 2025

UFC 317: Topuria vs. Oliveira
- The poster for UFC 317: Topuria vs. Oliveira
- Promotion: Ultimate Fighting Championship
- Date: June 28, 2025
- Venue: T-Mobile Arena
- City: Paradise, Nevada, United States
- Attendance: 19,800
- Total gate: $11,320,291

Event chronology
UFC on ABC: Hill vs. Rountree Jr.	UFC 317: Topuria vs. Oliveira	UFC on ESPN: Lewis vs. Teixeira

UFC 317: Topuria vs. Oliveira was a mixed martial arts event produced by the Ultimate Fighting Championship that took place on June 28, 2025, at T-Mobile Arena in Paradise, Nevada, part of the Las Vegas Valley, United States.

== Background ==
The event was held during the UFC's annual International Fight Week. The 2025 UFC Hall of Fame induction ceremony also took place during the week.

A UFC Lightweight Championship bout for the vacant title between former UFC Featherweight Champion Ilia Topuria and former champion Charles Oliveira served as the event's headliner. Current champion Islam Makhachev vacated the title in order to challenge for the UFC Welterweight Championship. Topuria vacated his featherweight title in April in order to move up to lightweight. Arman Tsarukyan (who was previously scheduled to challenge for the title at UFC 311 but pulled out a day before the event due to injury) served as backup and potential replacement for this fight.

A UFC Flyweight Championship bout between current champion Alexandre Pantoja and former interim title challenger Kai Kara-France co-headlined the event. The bout was originally rumored to take place at UFC 314 and UFC 316, but the bookings were never confirmed. The pairing previously met in an exhibition match in the quarterfinals of The Ultimate Fighter: Tournament of Champions in November 2016, when Pantoja won the two-round bout by unanimous decision.

A flyweight bout between former title challenger (also former LFA Flyweight Champion) Brandon Royval and former RIZIN Bantamweight Champion Manel Kape was scheduled to take part at this event. They were originally scheduled to headline UFC Fight Night: Kape vs. Almabayev in a title eliminator, but Royval had to withdraw due to multiple concussions. In turn, Kape pulled out this time on June 9 due to a broken foot and was replaced by Joshua Van.

A lightweight bout between Beneil Dariush and former title challenger Renato Moicano took place at this event. They were initially supposed to compete at UFC 311 but Moicano ended up challenging Islam Makhachev for the title in the main event on short notice.

A heavyweight bout between Justin Tafa and Jhonata Diniz was scheduled for this event. However, Tafa withdrew from the fight for unknown reasons and was replaced by promotional newcomer Alvin Hines.

A middleweight bout between former UFC Middleweight Championship challenger Paulo Costa and Roman Kopylov was scheduled for this event. However, for unknown reasons the bout was moved to UFC 318.

Sedriques Dumas was scheduled to face undefeated promotional newcomer Jackson McVey at this event in a middleweight bout. However, Dumas pulled out for unknown reasons and was replaced by another undefeated newcomer Christopher Ewert. Ewert then proceeded to miss weight by 10 pounds and was cut the same day, forcing the fight to be cancelled.

== Results ==
Main card
Weight class				Method	Round	Time	Notes
Lightweight	Ilia Topuria	def.	Charles Oliveira	KO (punches)	1	2:27	(Note: For the vacant UFC Lightweight Championship.)
Flyweight	Alexandre Pantoja (c)	def.	Kai Kara-France	Submission (rear-naked choke)	3	1:55	(Note: For the UFC Flyweight Championship.)
Flyweight	Joshua Van	def.	Brandon Royval	Decision (unanimous) (29–28, 29–28, 30–27)	3	5:00	(Note: UFC Flyweight title eliminator.)
Lightweight	Beneil Dariush	def.	Renato Moicano	Decision (unanimous) (29–28, 29–28, 29–28)	3	5:00
Bantamweight	Payton Talbott	def.	Felipe Lima	Decision (unanimous) (29–28, 29–28, 29–28)	3	5:00
Preliminary card (ESPN / ESPN+ / Disney+)
Middleweight	Gregory Rodrigues	def.	Jack Hermansson	KO (punch)	1	4:21
Featherweight	José Miguel Delgado	def.	Hyder Amil	KO (knee and elbows)	1	0:26
Women's Flyweight	Tracy Cortez	def.	Viviane Araújo	Decision (unanimous) (30–27, 30–27, 30–27)	3	5:00
Lightweight	Terrance McKinney	def.	Viacheslav Borshchev	Submission (guillotine choke)	1	0:55
Early preliminary card (ESPN+ / Disney+ / UFC Fight Pass)
Welterweight	Jacobe Smith	def.	Niko Price	Submission (rear-naked choke)	2	4:03
Heavyweight	Jhonata Diniz	def.	Alvin Hines	Decision (unanimous) (29–28, 29–28, 29–28)	3	5:00

== Bonus awards ==
The following fighters received $50,000 bonuses.

- Fight of the Night: Joshua Van vs. Brandon Royval
- Performance of the Night: Ilia Topuria and Gregory Rodrigues

== See also ==
- 2025 in UFC
- List of current UFC fighters
- List of UFC events
