= Alexandre Pantoja =

Brazilian mixed martial artist (born 1990)

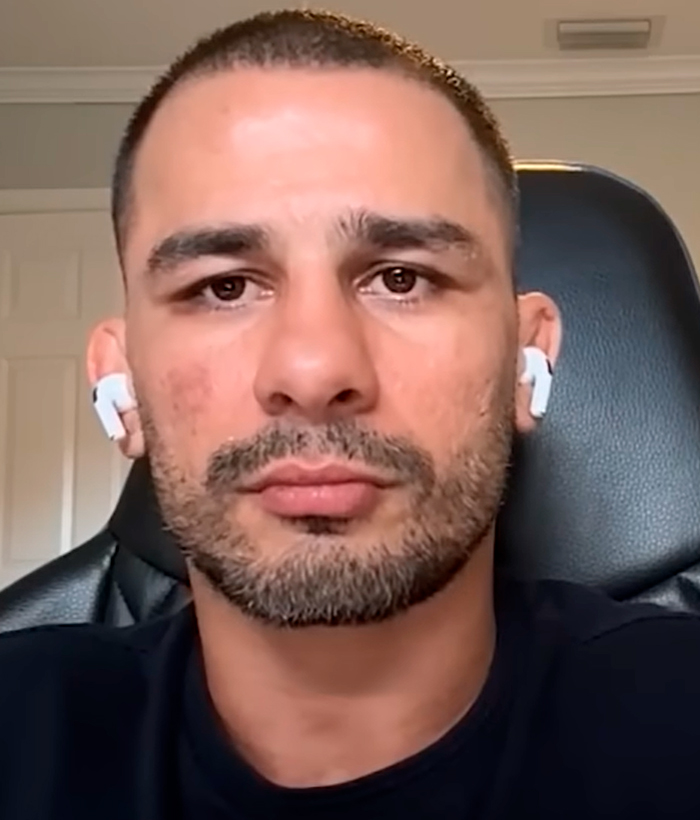
- Pantoja in 2025
- Born: Alexandre Pantoja Passidomo; April 16, 1990 (age 36); Rio de Janeiro, Brazil
- Other names: The Cannibal
- Nationality: Brazilian
- Height: 5 ft 5 in (1.65 m)
- Weight: 125 lb (57 kg; 8 st 13 lb)
- Division: Flyweight
- Reach: 68 in (173 cm)
- Style: Brazilian Jiu-Jitsu
- Stance: Orthodox
- Fighting out of: Arraial do Cabo, Brazil
- Team: Black House (formerly); American Top Team (2018–present)
- Rank: Black belt in Brazilian jiu-jitsu
- Years active: 2007–present

Mixed martial arts record
- Total: 37
- Wins: 30
- By knockout: 8
- By submission: 12
- By decision: 10
- Losses: 7
- By knockout: 1
- By decision: 6

Other information
- Mixed martial arts record from Sherdog

Alexandre Pantoja Passidomo (born April 16, 1990) is a Brazilian professional mixed martial artist. He currently competes in the flyweight division of the Ultimate Fighting Championship (UFC), where he is the former UFC Flyweight Champion. He is considered one of the greatest flyweights of all time. As of September 19, 2026, he is #2 in the Meta UFC flyweight rankings and as of September 22, 2026, he is #14 in the UFC men's pound-for-pound rankings.

Pantoja captured the UFC Flyweight Championship by defeating Brandon Moreno at UFC 290 on July 8, 2023. He successfully defended the title four consecutive times en route to an eight fight win streak. Pantoja holds many UFC records in the flyweight division, including the most wins, most submissions, and most finishes. He is also the first male UFC flyweight to win a title fight at the age of 35 or older.

== Early life ==
Alexandre Pantoja was born and raised in Rio de Janeiro, Brazil. The youngest of three children, his mother, Ester Pantoja, was adopted as a child as her biological parents could not afford to raise her. The surname "Pantoja," inherited from his mother's adoptive family, was taken by Alexandre and, according to him, carried with pride throughout his MMA career.

During his childhood, he experienced difficult moments with his parents' separation, after family conflicts led his father to leave home. Raised primarily by his mother, he was introduced to Brazilian jiu-jitsu at the age of 11 through the influence of his stepfather, Moraes, with whom he began training at the traditional academy of renowned master Osvaldo Alves in Copacabana. At age 12, he moved with his family to Arraial do Cabo, where he started training with boys his own age for the first time, having previously only trained with older athletes.

Despite a promising start in martial arts, his relationship with his stepfather deteriorated due to alcohol-related problems, which led Pantoja to move to Bahia to live with his father. There, he maintained his dedication to jiu-jitsu and began teaching the discipline at just 15 years old, in addition to winning his first state title in the gentle art.

Back in Arraial do Cabo, he participated in a jiu-jitsu championship held in a ring, where he first encountered muay thai. Fascinated by the new martial art, he began training under the guidance of master Helbert Reis, accumulating several victories in the sport. However, due to the lack of financial return in muay thai, often having to pay to compete, he decided to transition to mixed martial arts. His professional MMA debut occurred at the age of 17.

== Mixed martial arts career ==
=== The Ultimate Fighter: Tournament of Champions ===
On May 11, 2016, the UFC announced that the 16 contestants for the season of this TUF would be flyweight champion fighters from various organizations around the world, with the winner being expected to have a chance to fight for the flyweight title against Demetrious Johnson. The cast was announced on July 20. The coaches for the season were the former challengers to the flyweight belt, Joseph Benavidez and Henry Cejudo, and Pantoja was from Team Cejudo.

He was ranked # 1 in Team Cejudo, and made his first fight against # 16 Team Benavidez, Brandon Moreno. The two came to interact within the house, even with Pantoja speaking Portuguese and Brandon Moreno speaking Spanish, the similarity between languages facilitated communication. In the fight, Alexandre Pantoja defeated Brandon Moreno by submission in the second round. With this victory, Pantoja went to the quarterfinals of the reality show.

Pantoja faced fellow team Cejudo member Kai Kara-France in the quarterfinals, defeating him by unanimous decision and progressing through to the semifinals.

Pantoja faced Hiromasa Ougikubo in the semifinals of the tournament and was defeated by unanimous decision, and it was soon announced that he had contracted with the UFC.

=== Ultimate Fighting Championship ===
Alexandre made his promotional debut on January 28, 2017, at UFC on Fox 23 against Eric Shelton. He won the fight via split decision.

Pantoja faced Neil Seery on July 16, 2017 at UFC Fight Night 113. He won the fight via submission in the third round.

Pantoja faced Dustin Ortiz on January 20, 2018 at UFC 220. He lost the fight by unanimous decision.

Pantoja faced Brandon Moreno on May 19, 2018 at UFC Fight Night 129. He won the fight by unanimous decision.

Pantoja faced Ulka Sasaki on November 17, 2018 at UFC Fight Night 140. He won the fight via rear-naked choke submission in the first round.

Pantoja faced Wilson Reis on April 13, 2019 at UFC 236. He won the fight via TKO in the first round.

Pantoja faced Deiveson Figueiredo on July 27, 2019 at UFC 240. He lost the fight via unanimous decision. This fight earned him the Fight of the Night award.

Pantoja faced Matt Schnell on December 21, 2019 at UFC Fight Night 165. He won the fight via first-round knockout. The win also earned Pantoja his first Performance of the Night bonus award.

Pantoja faced Askar Askarov at UFC Fight Night 172 on July 19, 2020. He lost the fight via unanimous decision.

Pantoja was expected to face promotional newcomer and the former Rizin FF Bantamweight champion Manel Kape on December 19, 2020 at UFC Fight Night 183. However, Pantoja pulled out of the fight in early December due to COVID-19 symptoms. The fight eventually took place on February 6, 2021 at UFC Fight Night 184. Pantoja won the fight via unanimous decision.

Pantoja faced Brandon Royval on August 21, 2021 UFC on ESPN 29. He won the fight via rear-naked choke in round two. With this win, Pantoja earned the Performance of the Night award. Pantoja was meant to fight for the UFC flyweight title but a knee injury forced him out of it.

Pantoja faced Alex Perez on July 30, 2022, at UFC 277. He won the fight via a neck crank submission early in the first round. The win also earned Pantoja his third Performance of the Night award.

==== UFC Flyweight Champion ====
Pantoja rematched Brandon Moreno on July 8, 2023 at UFC 290 for the UFC Flyweight Championship. Pantoja came out victorious via split decision, winning the bout and the title. This fight earned him the Fight of the Night award.

In his first title defense, Pantoja faced Brandon Royval in a rematch on December 16, 2023, at UFC 296. He successfully defended his title, winning the bout via unanimous decision.

Pantoja faced Steve Erceg on May 4, 2024, at UFC 301. He won and successfully defended his title via unanimous decision.

Pantoja made his third UFC Flyweight Championship title defense against former two-time Rizin Bantamweight Champion and promotional newcomer Kai Asakura on December 7, 2024 at UFC 310. He won the fight via a rear-naked choke submission in the second round. This fight earned him another Performance of the Night award.

Pantoja was reportedly going to make his fourth title defense against Kai Kara-France on April 12, 2025, at UFC 314. However, for unknown reasons, the bout was reportedly moved to June 7, 2025 at UFC 316 but never came to fruition. The bout was rescheduled and took place on June 28, 2025 at UFC 317. Pantoja won the fight via a rear-naked choke submission in the third round. With this victory, Pantoja became the record holder for the most wins, submission victories, and overall finishes in UFC Flyweight division history.

Pantoja attempted to make his fifth title defence against Joshua Van on December 6, 2025 at UFC 323. He lost the championship in the first round via technical knockout due to an arm injury. Alexandre threw a high kick, which was blocked and grabbed by Joshua, who then pushed him down and caused Alexandre to land on his arm, causing an elbow dislocation.

Pantoja rematched Joshua Van for the championship on September 19, 2026 at UFC 331. He lost the fight by unanimous decision. This fight earned him a $100,000 Fight of the Night award.

== Personal life ==
Pantoja is married and has two sons. After winning the UFC Flyweight Championship at UFC 290, Pantoja revealed in the post-fight interview that his father had abandoned his family, leaving his mother to raise him and his two brothers alone, and (facing the camera) asked his father if he was proud of him now. He is brand ambassador, along with Diego Lopes and Valter Walker, as part of the multi-year branding deal between the UFC and Spribe.

== Championships and accomplishments ==
- Ultimate Fighting Championship
  - UFC Flyweight Championship (One time)
    - Four successful title defenses
    - Second most title fight wins in UFC Flyweight division history (5) (behind Demetrious Johnson)
    - Oldest fighter in history to win a UFC Flyweight title fight (35 years, 73 days)
  - Fight of the Night (Three times) vs. Deiveson Figueiredo, Brandon Moreno 2 and Joshua Van 2
  - Performance of the Night (Four times) vs. Matt Schnell, Brandon Royval 1, Alex Perez and Kai Asakura
    - Tied (Brandon Moreno & Brandon Royval) for second most Post-Fight bonuses in UFC Flyweight division history (7) (behind Demetrious Johnson)
  - Most wins in UFC Flyweight division history (14)
  - Most finishes in UFC Flyweight division history (8)
  - Most submissions in UFC Flyweight division history (6)
    - Fourth most submission attempts in UFC Flyweight division history (14)
  - Tied (Joshua Van) for the second longest win streak in UFC Flyweight division history (8) (behind Demetrious Johnson)
  - Tied (Joseph Benavidez) for third most bouts in UFC Flyweight division history (19)
  - Third most takedowns landed in UFC Flyweight division history (45)
  - Third most significant strikes in UFC Flyweight division history (1088)
    - Fifth most total strikes in UFC Flyweight division history (1326)
  - Fourth most total fight time in UFC Flyweight division history (3:59:47)
  - Second most control time in UFC Flyweight division history (1:18:30) (behind Demetrious Johnson)
  - Third most top position time in UFC Flyweight division history (1:01:02)
  - UFC Honors Awards
    - 2023: President's Choice Fight of the Year Nominee vs. Brandon Moreno 2
  - UFC.com Awards
    - 2023: Ranked #5 Fighter of the Year & Ranked #2 Fight of the Year vs. Brandon Moreno 2
    - 2024: Ranked #8 Fighter of the Year & Ranked #7 Submission of the Year vs. Kai Asakura
- Resurrection Fighting Alliance
  - RFA Flyweight Championship (One time)
  - AXS TV Flyweight Superfight Championship (One time)
- New York Post
  - 2023 Fight of the Year vs. Brandon Moreno 2 at UFC 290
- MMA Junkie
  - 2019 July Fight of the Month vs. Deiveson Figueiredo
  - 2026 September Fight of the Month vs. Joshua Van
- Combat Press
  - 2023 Fight of the Year vs. Brandon Moreno 2 at UFC 290
- World MMA Awards
  - 2024 Nomination – Charles Lewis Fighter of the Year
  - 2024 Nomination – Fight of the Year vs. Brandon Moreno 2 at UFC 290
- MMA Fighting
  - 2023 First Team MMA All-Star
  - 2024 First Team MMA All-Star
- MMA Mania
  - 2023 Fighter of the Year
  - 2024 #4 Ranked Submission of the Year vs. Kai Asakura at UFC 310
- Bleacher Report
  - 2023 #2 Ranked UFC Fight of the Year vs. Brandon Moreno 2 at UFC 290

== Mixed martial arts record ==
Professional record breakdown
37 matches	30 wins	7 losses
By knockout	8	1
By submission	12	0
By decision	10	6

Res.	Record	Opponent	Method	Event	Date	Round	Time	Location	Notes
Loss	30–7	Joshua Van	Decision (unanimous)	UFC 331	September 19, 2026	5	5:00	Los Angeles, California, United States	For the UFC Flyweight Championship. Fight of the Night.
Loss	30–6	Joshua Van	TKO (arm injury)	UFC 323	December 6, 2025	1	0:26	Las Vegas, Nevada, United States	Lost the UFC Flyweight Championship.
Win	30–5	Kai Kara-France	Submission (rear-naked choke)	UFC 317	June 28, 2025	3	1:54	Las Vegas, Nevada, United States	Defended the UFC Flyweight Championship.
Win	29–5	Kai Asakura	Technical Submission (rear-naked choke)	UFC 310	December 7, 2024	2	2:05	Las Vegas, Nevada, United States	Defended the UFC Flyweight Championship. Performance of the Night.
Win	28–5	Steve Erceg	Decision (unanimous)	UFC 301	May 4, 2024	5	5:00	Rio de Janeiro, Brazil	Defended the UFC Flyweight Championship.
Win	27–5	Brandon Royval	Decision (unanimous)	UFC 296	December 16, 2023	5	5:00	Las Vegas, Nevada, United States	Defended the UFC Flyweight Championship.
Win	26–5	Brandon Moreno	Decision (split)	UFC 290	July 8, 2023	5	5:00	Las Vegas, Nevada, United States	Won the UFC Flyweight Championship. Fight of the Night.
Win	25–5	Alex Perez	Submission (neck crank)	UFC 277	July 30, 2022	1	1:31	Dallas, Texas, United States	Performance of the Night.
Win	24–5	Brandon Royval	Submission (rear-naked choke)	UFC on ESPN: Cannonier vs. Gastelum	August 21, 2021	2	1:46	Las Vegas, Nevada, United States	Performance of the Night.
Win	23–5	Manel Kape	Decision (unanimous)	UFC Fight Night: Overeem vs. Volkov	February 6, 2021	3	5:00	Las Vegas, Nevada, United States	
Loss	22–5	Askar Askarov	Decision (unanimous)	UFC Fight Night: Figueiredo vs. Benavidez 2	July 19, 2020	3	5:00	Abu Dhabi, United Arab Emirates	
Win	22–4	Matt Schnell	KO (punches)	UFC Fight Night: Edgar vs. The Korean Zombie	December 21, 2019	1	4:17	Busan, South Korea	Performance of the Night.
Loss	21–4	Deiveson Figueiredo	Decision (unanimous)	UFC 240	July 27, 2019	3	5:00	Edmonton, Alberta, Canada	Fight of the Night.
Win	21–3	Wilson Reis	TKO (punches)	UFC 236	April 13, 2019	1	2:58	Atlanta, Georgia, United States	
Win	20–3	Ulka Sasaki	Submission (rear-naked choke)	UFC Fight Night: Magny vs. Ponzinibbio	November 17, 2018	1	2:18	Buenos Aires, Argentina	
Win	19–3	Brandon Moreno	Decision (unanimous)	UFC Fight Night: Maia vs. Usman	May 19, 2018	3	5:00	Santiago, Chile	
Loss	18–3	Dustin Ortiz	Decision (unanimous)	UFC 220	January 20, 2018	3	5:00	Boston, Massachusetts, United States	
Win	18–2	Neil Seery	Submission (rear-naked choke)	UFC Fight Night: Nelson vs. Ponzinibbio	July 16, 2017	3	2:31	Glasgow, Scotland	
Win	17–2	Eric Shelton	Decision (split)	UFC on Fox: Shevchenko vs. Peña	January 28, 2017	3	5:00	Denver, Colorado, United States	
Win	16–2	Damacio Page	Technical Submission (triangle choke)	RFA vs. Legacy FC 1	August 5, 2015	2	5:00	Robinsonville, Mississippi, United States	Won the inaugural AXS TV Flyweight Superfight Championship.
Win	15–2	Matt Manzanares	Submission (rear-naked choke)	RFA 18	December 9, 2014	2	2:38	Albuquerque, New Mexico, United States	Won the RFA Flyweight Championship.
Win	14–2	Lincoln de Sá Oliveira	Decision (unanimous)	Shooto Brazil 45	December 20, 2013	3	5:00	Rio de Janeiro, Brazil	
Win	13–2	Daniel Araújo	Submission (rear-naked choke)	Watch Out Combat Show 31	November 1, 2013	1	2:13	Rio de Janeiro, Brazil	WOCS Flyweight Tournament Semifinal.
Win	12–2	Rodrigo Favacho dos Santos	Submission (rear-naked choke)	MMA Fight Show 1	March 16, 2013	1	4:29	Arraial do Cabo, Brazil	
Win	11–2	Lincoln de Sá Oliveira	Decision (unanimous)	Shooto Brazil 32	July 14, 2012	3	5:00	Rio de Janeiro, Brazil	
Win	10–2	Sandro Gemaque de Souza	KO (punches)	Fatality Arena Fight Night 1	December 9, 2011	3	3:58	Niterói, Brazil	
Win	9–2	Samuel de Souza	TKO (elbows and punches)	World Fighting Combat 3	December 22, 2010	1	1:23	Rio de Janeiro, Brazil	
Win	8–2	Bruno Azevedo	Submission (rear-naked choke)	Shooto Brazil 18	September 17, 2010	1	N/A	Brasília, Brazil	
Loss	7–2	Jussier Formiga	Decision (unanimous)	Shooto Brazil 16	June 12, 2010	3	5:00	Rio de Janeiro, Brazil	
Win	7–1	Ralph Alves	Decision (split)	Watch Out Combat Show 6	December 12, 2009	3	5:00	Rio de Janeiro, Brazil	
Win	6–1	Magno Alves	KO (punch)	Watch Out Combat Show 5	September 27, 2009	1	N/A	Rio de Janeiro, Brazil	
Win	5–1	Michael William Costa	Decision (unanimous)	Shooto Brazil 13	August 27, 2009	3	5:00	Fortaleza, Brazil	
Win	4–1	Bruno Moreno	TKO (doctor stoppage)	Shooto Brazil 12	May 30, 2009	3	4:09	Rio de Janeiro, Brazil	
Win	3–1	Gabriel Wolff	TKO (doctor stoppage)	Shooto Brazil 11	March 28, 2009	2	5:00	Rio de Janeiro, Brazil	
Loss	2–1	William Vianna	Decision (split)	Watch Out Combat Show 2	September 25, 2008	3	5:00	Rio de Janeiro, Brazil	
Win	2–0	Peterson Malfort	TKO (punches)	Rocinha Fight	August 2, 2008	2	N/A	Rio de Janeiro, Brazil	
Win	1–0	Antônio Carlos	Submission (armbar)	Vila Fight	July 21, 2007	1	N/A	Rio de Janeiro, Brazil	

Exhibition record breakdown		
3 matches	2 wins	1 loss
By submission	1	0
By decision	1	1

Res.	Record	Opponent	Method	Event	Date	Round	Time	Location	Notes
Loss	2–1	Hiromasa Ougikubo	Decision (unanimous)	The Ultimate Fighter: Tournament of Champions	November 23, 2016	2	5:00	Las Vegas, Nevada, United States	TUF 24 Semi Finals
Win	2–0	Kai Kara-France	Decision (unanimous)	The Ultimate Fighter: Tournament of Champions	November 2, 2016	2	5:00	Las Vegas, Nevada, United States	TUF 24 Quarter Finals
Win	1–0	Brandon Moreno	Submission (rear-naked choke)	The Ultimate Fighter: Tournament of Champions	August 31, 2016	2	3:44	Las Vegas, Nevada, United States	TUF 24 Round of 16

*Date given is the air date of the episode. The actual dates of the fight are not released by the UFC

== Pay-per-view bouts ==
No	Event	Fight	Date	Venue	City	PPV buys
1.	UFC 301	Pantoja vs. Erceg	May 4, 2024	Farmasi Arena	Rio de Janeiro, Brazil	67,000
2.	UFC 310	Pantoja vs. Asakura	December 7, 2024	T-Mobile Arena	Las Vegas, Nevada, United States	Not Disclosed

== See also ==
- List of current UFC fighters
- List of male mixed martial artists

Awards and achievements
Preceded by Brandon Moreno	7th UFC Flyweight Champion; July 8, 2023 – December 6, 2025	Succeeded by Joshua Van
