= Dustin Ortiz =

American martial artist

- Born: December 25, 1988 (age 37); Franklin, Tennessee, U.S.
- Height: 5 ft 5 in (1.65 m)
- Weight: 125 lb (57 kg; 8 st 13 lb)
- Division: Flyweight
- Reach: 65 in (165 cm)
- Fighting out of: Franklin, Tennessee, United States
- Team: Roufusport (until 2016); Combat Sports Academy (2016–present)
- Rank: Black belt in Brazilian Jiu-Jitsu under Ray Casias
- Years active: 2010–present

Mixed martial arts record
- Total: 29
- Wins: 20
- By knockout: 8
- By submission: 5
- By decision: 7
- Losses: 9
- By submission: 1
- By decision: 8

Other information
- Mixed martial arts record from Sherdog

Dustin Ortiz (born December 25, 1988) is an American mixed martial artist who competes in the Flyweight division and is currently signed to the Brave CF. A professional competitor since 2010, Ortiz has also formerly competed for the UFC, RFA, Tachi Palace Fights, King of the Cage and Strikeforce.

== Background ==
Born and raised in Franklin, Tennessee, Ortiz competed in wrestling at Franklin High School where he was a standout. After graduating, Ortiz was working in construction before being drawn to mixed martial arts.

== Mixed martial arts career ==
=== Early career ===
Ortiz made his professional MMA debut in February 2010, fighting Lucas Thomas at GFC 6, which Ortiz won via first round submission. Ortiz then signed a contract with Strikeforce, but only fought two times with the promotion, he beat Justin Pennington and Matt Horning in his two fights with Strikeforce. Ortiz made his King of the Cage debut in August 2012. In his first fight with KOTC he beat Thiago Veiga by unanimous decision. Ortiz took a small break from MMA shortly after, but returned in January 2013, fighting at RFA 6, he beat Aaron Ely by split decision. Ortiz returned to King of the Cage in what would be his last independent fight before signing with UFC, he fought MMA veteran Mike French to a unanimous decision win.

=== Ultimate Fighting Championship ===
It was announced Ortiz would be making his debut at UFC Fight Night 27 against Justin Scoggins, but the bout was removed from the card for unknown reasons.

Ortiz instead made his debut against Jose Maria Tome at UFC Fight Night 32 in November 2013. He won the fight via TKO in the third round.

Ortiz faced John Moraga on January 15, 2014, at UFC Fight Night 35. He lost the fight via split decision.

Ortiz was expected to face Alptekin Ozkilic on April 11, 2014, at UFC Fight Night 39. However, on April 3, the fight was cancelled due to an injury to Ozkilic. Subsequently, Ortiz was quickly rescheduled and faced promotional newcomer Ray Borg on April 19, 2014, at UFC on Fox 11. Ortiz edged out Borg for a split decision victory.

Ortiz faced Juan Ramirez on May 7, 2014, at the World Championship, winning via Submission (armbar)

Ortiz faced Justin Scoggins on July 6, 2014, at The Ultimate Fighter 19 Finale. He won the fight via split decision.

Ortiz faced Joseph Benavidez on November 22, 2014, at UFC Fight Night 57. Ortiz lost the back-and-forth fight via unanimous decision.

A rematch with Ian McCall was expected to take place on August 8, 2015, at UFC Fight Night 73. However, McCall pulled out of the fight in late July citing injury and was replaced by Willie Gates. Ortiz dominated the fight with his wrestling and won via TKO in the third round.

Ortiz faced Wilson Reis on January 30, 2015, at UFC on Fox 18. He lost the fight by unanimous decision.

Ortiz next faced Jussier Formiga on September 24, 2016, at UFC Fight Night 95. He lost the fight via unanimous decision.

Ortiz faced Zach Makovsky on December 10, 2016, at UFC 206. He won the fight via split decision.

Ortiz next faced Brandon Moreno on April 22, 2017, at UFC Fight Night 108. He lost the fight via submission in the second round.

Ortiz faced Hector Sandoval on August 5, 2017, at UFC Fight Night 114. He won the fight via knockout just fifteen seconds into the first round, the fastest knockout in UFC Flyweight history. The win also earned Ortiz his first Performance of the Night bonus award.

Ortiz faced Alexandre Pantoja on January 20, 2018, at UFC 220. He won the fight by unanimous decision.

Ortiz faced Matheus Nicolau on July 28, 2018, at UFC on Fox 30. He won the fight via knockout due to a head kick and follow-up punches in the first round.

A rematch with Joseph Benavidez took place on January 19, 2019, at UFC Fight Night 143. He lost the fight via unanimous decision.

In an interview in January 2019, Henry Cejudo revealed that Ortiz was released from the UFC. In February 2019, Ortiz clarified that he was offered a release from his contract but opted to fight Benavidez as the last fight of his contract.

=== Post-UFC career ===
After his release from the UFC, Ortiz signed with the Brave CF. His first bout in the Flyweight tournament was a Quarter-final bout against fellow UFC veteran Ali Bagautinov on April 1, 2021, at Brave CF 50. Despite keeping the bout competitive, Ortiz lost via unanimous decision.

== Championships and accomplishments ==
- Sherdog
  - 2011 All-Violence Second Team
- Ultimate Fighting Championship
  - Performance of the Night (One time) vs. Hector Sandoval
  - Fastest knockout in UFC Flyweight history (15 seconds) vs. Hector Sandoval
  - Tied (Deiveson Figueiredo, John Lineker, Alex Perez & Joshua Van) for third most knockouts in UFC Flyweight division history (4)
  - Fifth most total strikes landed in UFC Flyweight division history (1124)
  - Fifth most takedowns landed in UFC Flyweight division history (35)

== Mixed martial arts record ==
Professional record breakdown
29 matches	20 wins	9 losses
By knockout	8	0
By submission	5	1
By decision	7	8

Res.	Record	Opponent	Method	Event	Date	Round	Time	Location	Notes
Win	20–9	Dillon Tolbert	Submission (guillotine choke)	Valor Underground 2	November 20, 2021	1	3:01	Nashville, Tennessee, United States	
Loss	19–9	Ali Bagautinov	Decision (unanimous)	Brave CF 50	April 1, 2021	3	5:00	Arad, Bahrain	Flyweight Tournament Quarter-Final Bout.
Loss	19–8	Joseph Benavidez	Decision (unanimous)	UFC Fight Night: Cejudo vs. Dillashaw	January 19, 2019	3	5:00	Brooklyn, New York, United States	
Win	19–7	Matheus Nicolau	KO (head kick and punches)	UFC on Fox: Alvarez vs. Poirier 2	July 28, 2018	1	3:49	Calgary, Alberta, Canada	
Win	18–7	Alexandre Pantoja	Decision (unanimous)	UFC 220	January 20, 2018	3	5:00	Boston, Massachusetts, United States	
Win	17–7	Hector Sandoval	KO (punches)	UFC Fight Night: Pettis vs. Moreno	August 5, 2017	1	0:15	Mexico City, Mexico	Performance of the Night.
Loss	16–7	Brandon Moreno	Technical Submission (rear-naked choke)	UFC Fight Night: Swanson vs. Lobov	April 22, 2017	2	4:06	Nashville, Tennessee, United States	
Win	16–6	Zach Makovsky	Decision (split)	UFC 206	December 10, 2016	3	5:00	Toronto, Ontario, Canada	
Loss	15–6	Jussier Formiga	Decision (unanimous)	UFC Fight Night: Cyborg vs. Lansberg	September 24, 2016	3	5:00	Brasília, Brazil	
Loss	15–5	Wilson Reis	Decision (unanimous)	UFC on Fox: Johnson vs. Bader	January 30, 2016	3	5:00	Newark, New Jersey, United States	
Win	15–4	Willie Gates	TKO (elbows and punches)	UFC Fight Night: Teixeira vs. Saint Preux	August 8, 2015	3	2:58	Nashville, Tennessee, United States	
Loss	14–4	Joseph Benavidez	Decision (unanimous)	UFC Fight Night: Edgar vs. Swanson	November 22, 2014	3	5:00	Austin, Texas, United States	
Win	14–3	Justin Scoggins	Decision (split)	The Ultimate Fighter: Team Edgar vs. Team Penn Finale	July 6, 2014	3	5:00	Las Vegas, Nevada, United States	
Win	13–3	Ray Borg	Decision (split)	UFC on Fox: Werdum vs. Browne	April 19, 2014	3	5:00	Orlando, Florida, United States	
Loss	12–3	John Moraga	Decision (split)	UFC Fight Night: Rockhold vs. Philippou	January 15, 2014	3	5:00	Duluth, Georgia, United States	
Win	12–2	José Maria Tomé	TKO (punches)	UFC Fight Night: Belfort vs. Henderson	November 9, 2013	3	3:19	Goiânia, Brazil	
Win	11–2	Mike French	Decision (unanimous)	KOTC: Train Wreck	January 27, 2013	3	5:00	Lac Du Flambeau, Wisconsin, United States	
Win	10–2	Aaron Ely	Decision (split)	RFA 6	January 18, 2013	3	5:00	Kansas City, Missouri, United States	
Win	9–2	Thiago Veiga	Decision (unanimous)	KOTC: Sudden Strike	August 4, 2012	3	5:00	Walker, Minnesota, United States	
Loss	8–2	Josh Robinson	Decision (split)	NAFC: Colosseum	May 4, 2012	3	5:00	Milwaukee, Wisconsin, United States	Catchweight (130 lbs) bout.
Win	8–1	Josh Rave	TKO (doctor stoppage)	TPF 11: Redemption	December 2, 2011	3	4:38	Lemoore, California, United States	
Loss	7–1	Ian McCall	Decision (unanimous)	TPF 9	May 6, 2011	3	5:00	Lemoore, California, United States	
Win	7–0	Matt Horning	TKO (punches)	Strikeforce Challengers: Woodley vs. Saffiedine	January 7, 2011	3	2:10	Nashville, Tennessee, United States	
Win	6–0	Cory Alexander	TKO (punches)	GFC: Gameness Fight Championship 8	October 9, 2010	3	4:46	Nashville, Tennessee, United States	Won the GFC Flyweight Championship.
Win	5–0	Andrew Higgins	TKO (punches)	GFC: Gameness Fight Series	July 15, 2010	2	3:52	Nashville, Tennessee, United States	
Win	4–0	Forrest Beard	Submission (rear-naked choke)	GFC: Gameness Fight Championship 7	June 19, 2010	1	1:28	Nashville, Tennessee, United States	
Win	3–0	Lucas Thomas	Submission (punches)	GFC: Gameness Fight Series	May 20, 2010	1	1:15	Goodlettsville, Tennessee, United States	
Win	2–0	Justin Pennington	Submission (rear-naked choke)	Strikeforce: Nashville	April 17, 2010	1	4:27	Nashville, Tennessee, United States	Flyweight debut.
Win	1–0	Lucas Thomas	Submission (arm-triangle choke)	GFC: Gameness Fighting Championship 6	February 20, 2010	1	1:00	Nashville, Tennessee, United States	

== See also ==
- List of current UFC fighters
- List of male mixed martial artists
