= AMC Pankration =

American mixed martial arts gym

AMC Kickboxing & Pankration
- Est.: 1991; 35 years ago
- Website: Official website

AMC Pankration (also known as AMC Kickboxing & Pankration) is an American mixed martial arts gym historically associated with coach Matt Hume. The gym was located in Kirkland, Washington in 2019, and Demetrious Johnson and Bibiano Fernandes trained in Woodinville in 2021. As of August 2026, the gym was temporarily closed while a new location was being evaluated.

== History ==
Hume told Evolve Daily in 2016 that he started a Pankration club at Central Washington University in 1988, which he described as the basis for AMC Kickboxing & Pankration. The American Martial Arts Center was operating in Kirkland in 1991 and later became AMC Kickboxing & Pankration.

Harumi Shimanishi owned AMC Kickboxing in 1999. In a 2000 interview, Hume said the original AMC Kickboxing had been founded by another instructor and that it became AMC Kickboxing & Pankration after the two joined forces.

In 2019, Johnson and Fernandes trained at AMC Kickboxing & Pankration in Kirkland under Hume.

Sherdog lists nine AMC events between 1999 and 2008, involving approximately 39 bouts.

== Notable fighters ==
- Demetrious Johnson
- Josh Barnett
- Rich Franklin
- Bibiano Fernandes
- Jens Pulver
- Jeff Monson
- Hayato Sakurai
- Chris Leben
- Matt Brown
- Tim Boetsch
- Caros Fodor
- Bob Sapp

== See also ==
- List of professional MMA training camps
