= Joshua Van =

Burmese-American mixed martial artist

- Van in 2025
- Born: Joshua Van Bawi Thawng; October 10, 2001 (age 25); Hakha, Chin State, Myanmar
- Native name: ယောရှုဗန်ဘွေထောင်း
- Other names: The Fearless
- Citizenship: Myanmar (Note: Expatriate); United States
- Height: 5 ft 5 in (1.65 m)
- Weight: 125 lb (57 kg; 8 st 13 lb)
- Division: Flyweight
- Reach: 65 in (165 cm)
- Fighting out of: Houston, Texas, U.S.
- Team: 4oz. Fight Club
- Rank: Blue belt in Brazilian Jiu-Jitsu
- Years active: 2021–present

Mixed martial arts record
- Total: 20
- Wins: 18
- By knockout: 9
- By submission: 2
- By decision: 7
- Losses: 2
- By knockout: 1
- By submission: 1

Other information
- Mixed martial arts record from Sherdog

Joshua Van Bawi Thawng (Burmese: ယောရှုဗန်ဘွေထောင်း; born October 10, 2001) is a Burmese and American professional mixed martial artist currently competing in the Flyweight division of the Ultimate Fighting Championship (UFC), where he is the current UFC Flyweight Champion. Van is the first fighter from Myanmar to sign with the promotion. At UFC 323, he became the UFC's first Asian-born male champion and the first champion to be born in the 2000s. As of September 22, 2026, he is #6 in the UFC men's pound-for-pound rankings.

== Background ==
Van was born on October 10, 2001 in Hakha, in the Chin State of western Myanmar, to a family of five siblings. Due to a country ridden with military and political conflict, his family moved to Malaysia when he was ten. In 2013, at the age of twelve, Van migrated with his family to the United States, settling in Houston.

== Mixed martial arts career ==
=== Early career ===
Van made his amateur MMA debut in December 2020. He accumulated a 4-0 record (2 KOs) in the regional Texan promotion Fury FC before turning professional.

Van made his professional MMA debut in October 2021. He continued to fight exclusively for Fury Fighting Championship, where he acquired a 7–1 record including in the main event of Fury FC 72 on December 18, 2022, where he submitted Cleveland McLean in the second round to win the promotion's Flyweight title.

=== Ultimate Fighting Championship ===
Van was scheduled to face Kevin Borjas on August 8, 2023, at Dana White's Contender Series 57, but he was pulled in order to face Zhalgas Zhumagulov at UFC on ABC 5 on June 24, 2023. This made him the first Burmese fighter to sign with the Ultimate Fighting Championship. He won the fight by split decision.

The bout between Van and Borjas was rescheduled on November 11, 2023, at UFC 295. He won the fight via unanimous decision.

Van faced Felipe Bunes, replacing Denys Bondar on January 13, 2024, at UFC Fight Night 234. He won the fight by second-round technical knockout.

Van was scheduled to face Lucas Rocha, replacing Jose Johnson on April 6, 2024, at UFC Fight Night 240. However, Rocha withdrew due to injury and the bout was scrapped.

Van was scheduled to face Su Mudaerji on June 1, 2024, at UFC 302. However, Su pulled out in late April due to undisclosed reasons and was replaced by Tatsuro Taira. In turn, both fighters were moved to UFC on ESPN 58 on June 15, 2024 and Van ended up being scheduled to face Tagir Ulanbekov instead. However, the bout was cancelled when Ulanbekov weighed in at 129.5 pounds, three and a half pounds over the flyweight non-title fight limit.

Van faced Charles Johnson on July 13, 2024, at UFC on ESPN 59. He lost the fight via knockout in the third round.

Van faced Édgar Cháirez, replacing Kevin Borjas on September 14, 2024, at UFC 306. He won the fight via unanimous decision.

Van faced Cody Durden on December 7, 2024, at UFC 310. He won the fight via unanimous decision.

Van was scheduled to face Bruno Gustavo da Silva on March 8, 2025, at UFC 313. However, Silva pulled out due to undisclosed reasons and was replaced by Road to UFC Season 2 flyweight winner Rei Tsuruya. He won the fight by unanimous decision.

Van's bout with Bruno Gustavo da Silva was rescheduled and took place on June 7, 2025 at UFC 316. Van won the fight by technical knockout late into the third round.

Van stepped in on three weeks short notice to face former LFA Flyweight Champion and UFC Flyweight Championship challenger Brandon Royval at UFC 317 on June 28, 2025, after Manel Kape was forced to withdraw from the bout due to a broken foot. Van won the fight against Royval by unanimous decision. This fight earned him his first Fight of the Night award. Van and Royval landed a total of 419 significant strikes, which broke the record for most significant strikes landed in a three-round UFC fight and flyweight bout. It would also be awarded Fight of the Year in the 17th Annual World MMA Awards.

==== Flyweight Championship ====
Van faced Alexandre Pantoja for the UFC Flyweight Championship on December 6, 2025 at UFC 323. Van defeated Pantoja by technical knockout 26 seconds into the first round when Pantoja sustained an arm injury from falling to the canvas, after having a kick attempt caught by Van. At 24 years old, Van became the second-youngest champion in UFC history, behind Jon Jones, and the first fighter born in the 2000s to win a UFC title. He also became the UFC's first Asian-born male champion.

Van was scheduled to make his first title defense against Tatsuro Taira on April 11, 2026 at UFC 327. However, due to a knee injury, Van withdrew from the bout, so the bout was postponed to May 9, 2026 which took place at UFC 328. He successfully defended the title and won the fight via technical knockout in the fifth round. This fight earned him a $100,000 Fight of the Night award.

Van defended his championship against Alexandre Pantoja in a rematch on September 19, 2026 at UFC 331. He won the fight by unanimous decision. This fight earned him another $100,000 Fight of the Night award.

Van is scheduled to defend his title against former RIZIN Bantamweight Champion Manel Kape on January 30, 2027 at UFC 336.

== Personal life ==
Van's father died in 2017 and as of July 2025, he lives with his mother. Van is a Christian.

Van is an avid fan of McDonald's and has mentioned to various media sources that he eats it for breakfast every morning, even during training camp.

== Championships and accomplishments ==
- Ultimate Fighting Championship
  - UFC Flyweight Championship (One time, current)
    - Two successful title defenses
    - Tied (Deiveson Figueiredo & Brandon Moreno) for third most title fight wins in UFC Flyweight division history (3)
    - Second youngest champion in UFC history (24 years, 57 days)
      - First Burmese-born champion in UFC history
      - First UFC champion born in the 2000s
      - Second Asian-born male champion in UFC history
  - Fight of the Night (Three times) vs. Brandon Royval, Tatsuro Taira and Alexandre Pantoja 2
  - Second highest significant strikes landed per minute in UFC history (8.26) (behind Carli Judice)
    - Highest significant strikes landed-per-minute in UFC Flyweight division history (8.26)
  - Highest striking differential in UFC Flyweight division history (2.43)
  - Most significant strikes landed in UFC Flyweight division history (1411)
    - Second most total strikes landed in UFC Flyweight division history (1825) (behind Tim Elliott)
  - Highest significant strike accuracy in UFC Flyweight division history (57.6%)
  - Tied (Alexandre Pantoja) for the second longest win streak in UFC Flyweight division history (8) (behind Demetrious Johnson)
  - Fifth most wins in UFC Flyweight division history (11)
  - Tied (Tim Elliott, Joseph Benavidez & Kyoji Horiguchi) for most decision wins in UFC Flyweight division history (7)
  - Tied (Deiveson Figueiredo, Dustin Ortiz, Alex Perez & John Lineker) for third most knockouts in UFC Flyweight division history (4)
  - Tied (Kai Kara-France & Manel Kape) for second most knockdowns in UFC Flyweight division history (8) (behind Deiveson Figueiredo)
  - UFC Honors Awards
    - 2025: President's Choice Fight of the Year Winner vs. Brandon Royval
  - UFC.com Awards
    - 2025: Ranked #2 Fighter of the Year, Fight of the Year vs. Brandon Royval & Half-Year Awards: Best Fight of the 1HY vs. Brandon Royval
    - 2026: Half-Year Awards: Best Fight of the 1HY vs. Tatsuro Taira
- Fury Fighting Championship
  - Fury FC Flyweight Championship (One time; former)
- World MMA Awards
  - July 1, 2024 – December 31, 2025 Fight of the Year vs. Brandon Royval at UFC 317
  - July 1, 2024 – December 31, 2025 Breakthrough Fighter of the Year
- ESPN
  - 2025 Breakout Fighter of the Year
  - 2025 Fight of the Year vs. Brandon Royval at UFC 317
- Sherdog
  - 2025 Male Fighter of the Year
  - 2025 Breakthrough Fighter of the Year
  - 2025 Fight of the Year vs. Brandon Royval at UFC 317
- Fight Matrix
  - 2025 Most Improved Fighter of the Year
- MMA Junkie
  - 2025 Breakout Fighter of the Year
  - 2025 Fight of the Year vs. Brandon Royval at UFC 317
- CBS Sports
  - 2025 UFC Fight of the Year vs. Brandon Royval
- theScore
  - 2025 Breakout Fighter of the Year
  - 2025 Fight of the Year vs. Brandon Royval
- The Wrightway Sports Network
  - 2025 Breakout Fighter of the Year
  - 2025 Fight of the Year vs. Brandon Royval at UFC 317
- MMA Mania
  - 2025 #3 Ranked Fighter of the Year
  - 2025 #4 Ranked Fight of the Year vs. Brandon Royval
- MMA Fighting
  - 2025 #5 Ranked Fighter of the Year
  - 2025 Breakthrough Fighter of the Year
  - 2025 Fight of the Year vs. Brandon Royval
  - 2025 First Team MMA All-Star
- Uncrowned
  - 2025 #4 Ranked Male Fighter of the Year
  - 2025 Breakthrough Fighter of the Year
- Cageside Press
  - 2022 Flyweight Prospect of the Year
  - 2025 Fight of the Year vs. Brandon Royval, tied with Prochazka vs. Rountree Jr.
- UFC Flyweight Bout Records
  - Fastest knockout/finish in a UFC flyweight title fight (0:26) (vs. Alexandre Pantoja 1)
  - Third fastest knockout/finish (0:26 (Note: Most in a UFC flyweight title fight.)) (vs. Alexandre Pantoja 1)
  - Second highest striking differential (+95) (vs. Cody Durden)
  - Second most significant strikes landed (204) (vs. Brandon Royval)
    - Fourth most significant strikes landed (181) (vs. Alexandre Pantoja 2)
    - Fifth most significant strikes landed (165) (vs. Cody Durden)
    - Sixth most significant strikes landed (156) (vs. Kevin Borjas)
  - Second most distance strikes landed (181) (vs. Brandon Royval)
    - Fourth most distant strikes landed (160) (vs. Alexandre Pantoja 2)
    - Fifth most distant strikes landed (153) (vs. Kevin Borjas)
    - Sixth most distant strikes landed (144) (vs. Cody Durden)
  - Third most significant head strikes landed (158) (vs. Alexandre Pantoja 2)
    - Fourth most significant head strikes landed (138) (vs. Brandon Royval)
    - Sixth most significant head strikes landed (131) (vs. Cody Durden)
  - Second most significant body strikes landed (49) (vs. Kevin Borjas)
  - Third most total strikes landed (259) (vs. Alexandre Pantoja 2)
    - Sixth most total strikes landed (209) (vs. Brandon Royval)
  - Third most total strikes attempted (392) (vs. Alexandre Pantoja 2)
  - Second most total head strikes landed (228) (vs. Alexandre Pantoja 2)
  - Most total strikes landed in a round (131 in R2 vs. Jeff Molina)

== Mixed martial arts record ==
Professional record breakdown
20 matches	18 wins	2 losses
By knockout	9	1
By submission	2	1
By decision	7	0

Res.	Record	Opponent	Method	Event	Date	Round	Time	Location	Notes
Win	18–2	Alexandre Pantoja	Decision (unanimous)	UFC 331	September 19, 2026	5	5:00	Los Angeles, California, United States	Defended the UFC Flyweight Championship. Fight of the Night.
Win	17–2	Tatsuro Taira	TKO (front kick to the body and punches)	UFC 328	May 9, 2026	5	1:32	Newark, New Jersey, United States	Defended the UFC Flyweight Championship. Fight of the Night.
Win	16–2	Alexandre Pantoja	TKO (arm injury)	UFC 323	December 6, 2025	1	0:26	Las Vegas, Nevada, United States	Won the UFC Flyweight Championship.
Win	15–2	Brandon Royval	Decision (unanimous)	UFC 317	June 28, 2025	3	5:00	Las Vegas, Nevada, United States	Fight of the Night.
Win	14–2	Bruno Gustavo da Silva	TKO (punches)	UFC 316	June 7, 2025	3	4:01	Newark, New Jersey, United States	
Win	13–2	Rei Tsuruya	Decision (unanimous)	UFC 313	March 8, 2025	3	5:00	Las Vegas, Nevada, United States	
Win	12–2	Cody Durden	Decision (unanimous)	UFC 310	December 7, 2024	3	5:00	Las Vegas, Nevada, United States	
Win	11–2	Édgar Cháirez	Decision (unanimous)	UFC 306	September 14, 2024	3	5:00	Las Vegas, Nevada, United States	
Loss	10–2	Charles Johnson	KO (punches)	UFC on ESPN: Namajunas vs. Cortez	July 13, 2024	3	0:20	Denver, Colorado, United States	
Win	10–1	Felipe Bunes	TKO (punches)	UFC Fight Night: Ankalaev vs. Walker 2	January 13, 2024	2	4:31	Las Vegas, Nevada, United States	
Win	9–1	Kevin Borjas	Decision (unanimous)	UFC 295	November 11, 2023	3	5:00	New York City, New York, United States	
Win	8–1	Zhalgas Zhumagulov	Decision (split)	UFC on ABC: Emmett vs. Topuria	June 24, 2023	3	5:00	Jacksonville, Florida, United States	
Win	7–1	Cleveland McLean	Submission (rear-naked choke)	Fury FC 72	December 18, 2022	2	4:49	Houston, Texas, United States	Won the vacant Fury FC Flyweight Championship.
Win	6–1	Paris Moran	TKO (punches)	Fury FC 67	August 14, 2022	2	0:36	Houston, Texas, United States	
Win	5–1	Mario Suazo	Submission (calf slicer)	Fury FC 62	May 15, 2022	2	4:23	Castle Rock, Colorado, United States	
Win	4–1	Angelo Trujillo	KO (head kick)	Fury FC 60	April 24, 2022	1	1:36	Houston, Texas, United States	
Win	3–1	Francisco Obando	TKO (punches)	Fury FC 57	February 11, 2022	1	3:08	Humble, Texas, United States	
Loss	2–1	Devon Jackson	Submission (rear-naked choke)	Fury FC 55	December 19, 2021	2	4:58	Houston, Texas, United States	
Win	2–0	Chase Eastham	TKO (punches)	Fury FC 54	November 21, 2021	2	3:24	Houston, Texas, United States	
Win	1–0	Tony Esquivel	TKO (knees to the body)	Fury FC 52	October 17, 2021	2	2:14	Houston, Texas, United States	Flyweight debut.

== See also ==
- List of current UFC fighters
- List of male mixed martial artists

== Notes ==
Awards and achievements
Preceded by Alexandre Pantoja	8th UFC Flyweight Champion; December 6, 2025 – present	Incumbent
Awards
Preceded by Max Holloway vs. Justin Gaethje	World MMA Fight of the Year; July 1, 2024 – December 31, 2025 vs. Brandon Royval at UFC 317	Incumbent
Preceded by Tom Aspinall	World MMA Breakthrough Fighter of the Year; July 1, 2024 – December 31, 2025	Incumbent
