= Askar Askarov =

Russian mixed martial artist (born 1992)

- Born: Askar Saypulayevich Askarov; October 9, 1992 (age 34); Kamysh-Kutan, Akhvakhsky District, Dagestan, Russia
- Native name: Аскар Аскаров
- Other names: Bullet
- Height: 5 ft 6 in (1.68 m)
- Weight: 125 lb (57 kg; 8.9 st)
- Division: Flyweight
- Reach: 67 in (170 cm)
- Style: Freestyle wrestling, Sambo
- Fighting out of: Khasavyurt, Dagestan, Russia
- Team: Fighting Eagles
- Rank: International Master of Sports of Russia in Freestyle Wrestling; Master of Sports of Russia in Combat Sambo
- Years active: 2013–present

Mixed martial arts record
- Total: 17
- Wins: 15
- By knockout: 4
- By submission: 7
- By decision: 4
- Losses: 1
- By decision: 1
- Draws: 1

Other information
- Mixed martial arts record from Sherdog

Askar Saypulayevich Askarov (Russian: Аскар Сайпулаевич Аскаров; born October 9, 1992) is a Russian professional mixed martial artist and freestyle wrestler who competes in the Flyweight division of Absolute Championship Akhmat (ACA). A professional since 2013, Askarov previously competed in the Ultimate Fighting Championship (UFC) and Absolute Championship Berkut (ACB), where he is a former ACB Flyweight Champion. Askarov is also a 2017 Summer Deaflympics 61 kg freestyle wrestling gold medalist.

== Personal life ==
Askarov was born to an Akhvakh family on 9 October 1992, in the village of Kamysh-Kutan in the Akhvakhsky District of Dagestan, an autonomous republic within the Russian Federation.

Askarov was born deaf, and though his hearing has improved, he can only hear approximately 20% of the sounds most people can, meaning he cannot hear instructions from his team during a fight. Askarov has represented Russia as part of the national deaf wrestling team, including at the Summer Deaflympics in Samsun, Turkey in 2017, where he won a gold medal.

== Mixed martial arts career ==
=== Early career ===
Askarov made his professional MMA debut in Russia in July 2013, against a fellow debutante in Shamil Amirov. He won the fight by a rear naked choke in the second round. In his second fight, he fought another debuting fighter, Kvanzhakov Kantemir, and won by a first round TKO. Askarov extended his winning streak to four, with stoppage wins against Elvin Abbasov and Vakha Kadyrov.

=== Absolute Championship Berkut ===
Following these two victories, Askarov signed with the Russian based promotion Absolute Championship Berkut. In his first fight with ACB, Askarov defeated Vyacheslav Gagiev by a second round TKO. During ACB 22, Askarov fought and submitted the undefeated Kirill Medvedovski. He was then scheduled to fight Marcin Lasota during ACB 29. Askarov won the fight by a second round TKO. In his fourth with the organization, Askarov was scheduled to fight Ruslan Abiltarov during ACB 38. He won the fight by rear naked choke, and was awarded a $5,000 bonus for the submission of the night.

These victories earned Askar the chance to fight José Maria Tomé for the vacant ACB Flyweight Championship. He beat José Maria Tomé by submission in the fifth round to become the first ACB flyweight champion. Askarov additionally earned a $5,000 bonus for the "Fight of the Night".

Askarov was scheduled to have his first title defense during ACB 58, when he was fought Anthony Leone. Askarov won the fight mid-way through the third round, by a body triangle neck crank.

Askarov was scheduled to defend his title for the second time against Rasul Albaskhanov, during ACB 86. He defeated Albaskhanov by a second round guillotine choke.

Following his signature with the UFC, Askarov vacated the ACB Flyweight title.

=== Ultimate Fighting Championship ===
Askarov made his UFC debut against Brandon Moreno on the main card of UFC Fight Night: Rodríguez vs. Stephens. Though Moreno was competing in front of his home fans in Mexico, they fought to a split draw after three rounds. 12 out of 13 media outlets scored the bout for Moreno.

For his second fight in the Octagon, Askarov was booked to face former UFC flyweight title challenger Tim Elliott at on January 18, 2020, at UFC 246. Askarov won the bout via unanimous decision.

In his third fight for the promotion, Askarov faced Alexandre Pantoja at UFC Fight Night 172 on July 19, 2020. He won the fight via unanimous decision.

Askarov faced Joseph Benavidez on March 6, 2021, at UFC 259. At the weigh-ins, Askar weighed in at 127 pounds, one pound over the flyweight non-title fight limit. His bout proceeded at a catchweight and he was fined 20 percent of his individual purse, which went to Benavidez. Askarov won the fight via unanimous decision.

Askarov was scheduled to face Alex Perez on July 31, 2021, on UFC on ESPN 28. However, Askarov pulled out of the fight in early July citing injury. In turn, Perez was removed from the card entirely and rescheduled to face Matt Schnell four weeks later on August 28, 2021, at UFC Fight Night 192.

Askarov faced Kai Kara-France on March 26, 2022, at UFC on ESPN 33. He lost the first bout of his professional career via unanimous decision.

The bout between Askarov and Perez was rescheduled and they were expected to meet on July 16, 2022, at UFC on ABC 3. Askarov pulled out once again in early June due to undisclosed reasons and Perez was rescheduled against Alexandre Pantoja at UFC 277.

Askarov was scheduled to face Brandon Royval on October 15, 2022, at UFC Fight Night 212. However the bout was cancelled the day before the event due to weight management issues.

At the end of October, Askarov requested and was granted a release to deal with his health issues.

=== Absolute Championship Akhmat ===
On January 28, 2023, it was announced that Askarov has signed a deal with Absolute Championship Akhmat (ACA).

Askarov was scheduled to face Azamat Kerefov on July 21, 2023, at ACA 160 as part of the 2023 ACA Flyweight Grand Prix, however the bout was scrapped after Askarov had to pull out due to medical issues.

Askarov faced Alan Gomes on November 24, 2023, at ACA 166. He won the bout via unanimous decision.

== Submission grappling career ==
Askarov faced Rogério Bontorin at ADXC 10 on May 31, 2025. He won the match by decision.

== Championships and accomplishments ==
=== Mixed martial arts ===
- Absolute Championship Berkut
  - ACB Flyweight Championship (One time, first)
    - Two successful title defenses

=== Freestyle wrestling ===
- 2017 Summer Deaflympics
  - Gold medal – 61 kg
- 2018 Deaf Wrestling World Championships
  - Bronze medal – 61 kg

== Mixed martial arts record ==
Professional record breakdown
| 17 matches | 15 wins | 1 loss |
| By knockout | 4 | 0 |
| By submission | 7 | 0 |
| By decision | 4 | 1 |
| Draws | 1 | |

| Res. | Record | Opponent | Method | Event | Date | Round | Time | Location | Notes |
|---|---|---|---|---|---|---|---|---|---|
| Win | 15–1–1 | Alan Gomes de Castro | Decision (unanimous) | ACA 166 | November 24, 2023 | 3 | 5:00 | Saint Petersburg, Russia | |
| Loss | 14–1–1 | Kai Kara-France | Decision (unanimous) | UFC on ESPN: Blaydes vs. Daukaus | March 26, 2022 | 3 | 5:00 | Columbus, Ohio, United States | |
| Win | 14–0–1 | Joseph Benavidez | Decision (unanimous) | UFC 259 | March 6, 2021 | 3 | 5:00 | Las Vegas, Nevada, United States | Catchweight (127 lb) bout; Askarov missed weight. |
| Win | 13–0–1 | Alexandre Pantoja | Decision (unanimous) | UFC Fight Night: Figueiredo vs. Benavidez 2 | July 19, 2020 | 3 | 5:00 | Abu Dhabi, United Arab Emirates | |
| Win | 12–0–1 | Tim Elliott | Decision (unanimous) | UFC 246 | January 18, 2020 | 3 | 5:00 | Las Vegas, Nevada, United States | |
| Draw | 11–0–1 | Brandon Moreno | Draw (split) | UFC Fight Night: Rodríguez vs. Stephens | September 21, 2019 | 3 | 5:00 | Mexico City, Mexico | |
| Win | 11–0 | Rasul Albaskhanov | Technical Submission (guillotine choke) | ACB 86 | May 5, 2018 | 2 | 1:59 | Moscow, Russia | Defended the ACB Flyweight Championship. |
| Win | 10–0 | Anthony Leone | Submission (twister) | ACB 58 | April 22, 2017 | 3 | 2:41 | Khasavyurt, Russia | Defended the ACB Flyweight Championship. |
| Win | 9–0 | José Maria Tomé | Submission (anaconda choke) | ACB 48 | October 22, 2016 | 5 | 1:57 | Moscow, Russia | Won the inaugural ACB Flyweight Championship. Fight of the Night. |
| Win | 8–0 | Ruslan Abiltarov | Submission (rear-naked choke) | ACB 38 | May 20, 2016 | 2 | 1:37 | Rostov-on-Don, Russia | Submission of the Night. |
| Win | 7–0 | Marcin Lasota | TKO (punches) | ACB 29 | February 6, 2016 | 2 | 3:35 | Warsaw, Poland | |
| Win | 6–0 | Kirill Medvedovsky | Submission (rear-naked choke) | ACB 22 | September 12, 2015 | 3 | 3:56 | Saint Petersburg, Russia | |
| Win | 5–0 | Vyacheslav Gagiev | TKO (punches) | ACB 17 | May 12, 2015 | 2 | 1:56 | Grozny, Russia | |
| Win | 4–0 | Vakha Kadyrov | TKO (punches) | Khasavyurt Fight: Dagestan MMA Open Cup 2014 | June 21, 2014 | 1 | 3:15 | Dagestan, Russia | |
| Win | 3–0 | Elvin Abbasov | Submission (armbar) | Grand European FC: Lights of Baku 2 | February 15, 2014 | 2 | 3:45 | Baku, Azerbaijan | |
| Win | 2–0 | Kvanzhakov Kantemir | TKO (punches) | Sparta Martial Arts Club: Team Sosnovy Bor vs. Team Leningrad Oblast | December 8, 2013 | 1 | 2:14 | Sosnovy Bor, Russia | |
| Win | 1–0 | Shamil Amirov | Submission (rear-naked choke) | Liga Kavkaz: Grand Umakhan Battle | July 7, 2013 | 2 | 2:05 | Khunzakh, Russia | Flyweight debut. |

== See also ==
- List of current ACA fighters
- List of male mixed martial artists
