= Brandon Moreno =

Mexican mixed martial artist (born 1993)

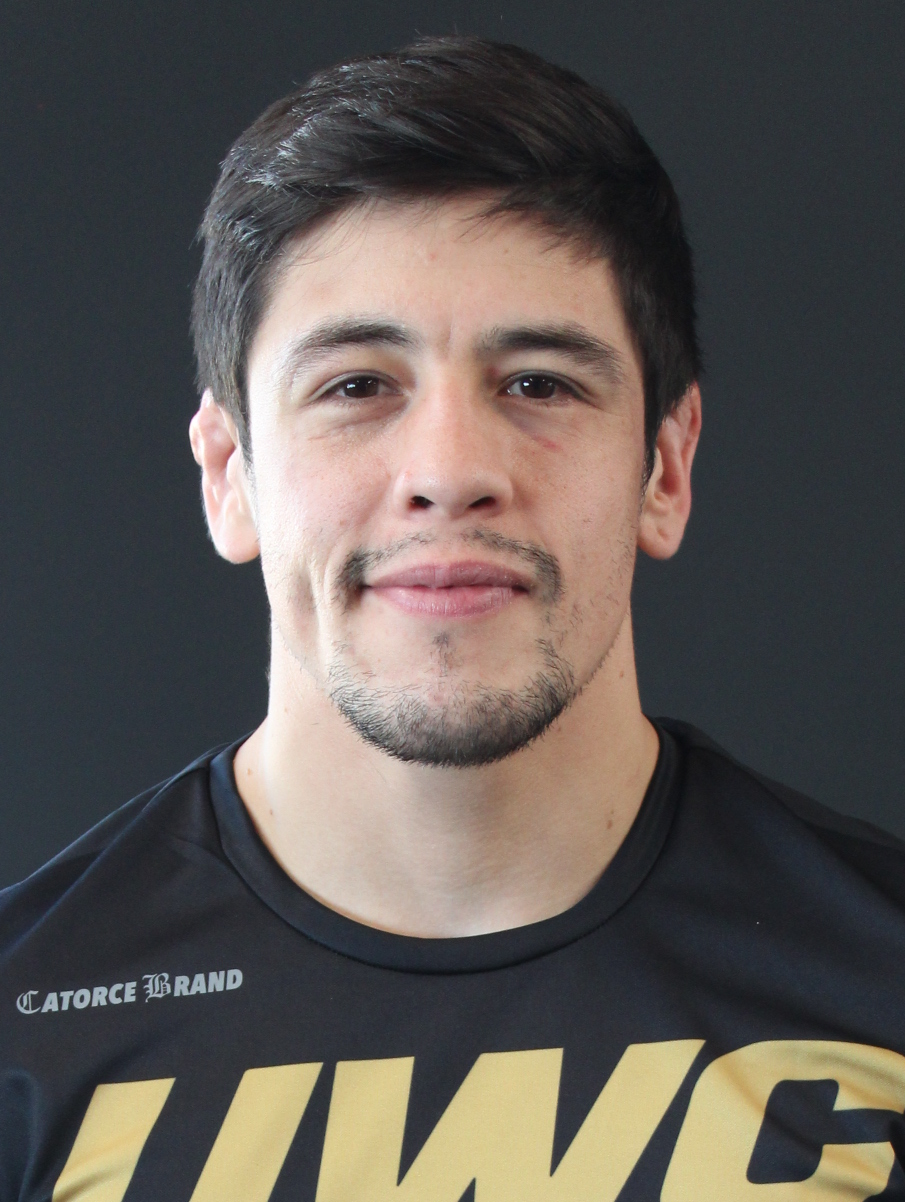
- Moreno in 2021
- Born: Brandon Moreno Carrillo; December 7, 1993 (age 32); Tijuana, Baja California, Mexico
- Nickname: The Assassin Baby
- Height: 5 ft 7 in (1.70 m)
- Weight: 125 lb (57 kg; 8.9 st)
- Division: Flyweight (2014–present); Bantamweight (2011–2014)
- Reach: 70 in (178 cm)
- Fighting out of: Tijuana, Baja California, Mexico
- Team: Entram Gym (2006–2022); Bang Muay Thai; Team Elevation; Glory MMA & Fitness (2022); Fortis MMA (2022–present)
- Rank: Black belt in Brazilian jiu-jitsu under Raúl Arvizu
- Years active: 2011–present

Mixed martial arts record
- Total: 36
- Wins: 24
- By knockout: 5
- By submission: 11
- By decision: 8
- Losses: 10
- By knockout: 1
- By decision: 9
- Draws: 2

Other information
- Mixed martial arts record from Sherdog

Brandon Moreno Carrillo (born December 7, 1993) is a Mexican professional mixed martial artist. He currently competes in the Flyweight division of the Ultimate Fighting Championship (UFC), where he is a former two-time UFC Flyweight Champion and the first Mexican fighter to win a UFC championship. A professional since 2011, Moreno also competed for the Legacy Fighting Alliance, where he was the Legacy Fighting Alliance Flyweight Champion. As of October 24, 2026, he is #9 in the Meta UFC flyweight rankings.

== Mixed martial arts career ==
=== Background ===
Moreno described himself as a boxing fan growing up but was not aware of other combat sports. He later became interested in capoeira, but was unable to find a school in his home city. While searching, he found an MMA gym and began training in kickboxing and jiu-jitsu.

=== Early career ===
Moreno made his professional MMA debut in his native Mexico in April 2011 at Ultimate Warrior Challenge Mexico. Over the next two years, he amassed a record of 6 wins and 3 losses.

In 2014, Moreno would debut for the World Fighting Federation promotion. He would go 5–0 in the promotion and would eventually win the Flyweight championship, which led to him being cast in the Flyweight tournament on the 25th season of The Ultimate Fighter.

=== The Ultimate Fighter ===
In July 2016, it was revealed that Moreno was a participant on The Ultimate Fighter: Tournament of Champions. Moreno was selected as a member of Team Benavidez. He faced Alexandre Pantoja in the opening stage and lost the fight via submission.

=== Ultimate Fighting Championship ===
In a rare move, Moreno debuted in the UFC while his season of The Ultimate Fighter was still airing. He faced Louis Smolka at UFC Fight Night: Lineker vs. Dodson on October 1, 2016. Moreno won the fight via submission in the first round. The win also earned Moreno his first Performance of the Night bonus award.

In his second fight for the promotion, Moreno returned to face Ryan Benoit on December 3, 2016, at The Ultimate Fighter: Tournament of Champions Finale. He won the fight via split decision. 18 out of 18 media outlets scored the bout for Moreno.

Moreno next faced Dustin Ortiz on April 22, 2017, at UFC Fight Night 108. He won the fight by submission in the second round and was awarded a Performance of the Night bonus.

Moreno faced Sergio Pettis on August 5, 2017, at UFC Fight Night 114. He lost the fight via unanimous decision. Moreno subsequently tested positive for clenbuterol from an in-competition urine sample collected on August 6, 2017, a day after his fight with Pettis. USADA has determined that the presence of clenbuterol in Moreno's system likely resulted from clenbuterol-contaminated meat that Moreno had consumed in Mexico, and so Moreno was not punished by USADA.

Moreno was expected to face Ray Borg on April 7, 2018, at UFC 223. However, the bout was canceled after Borg was injured by glass from a bus window that was smashed by Conor McGregor. The pairing was left intact and quickly rescheduled and was expected to take place on May 19, 2018, at UFC Fight Night 129. However, Borg withdrew from the bout to take care of his child from brain surgery, and was replaced by Alexandre Pantoja. Moreno lost the fight by unanimous decision. In an interview in 2019, Moreno revealed that he had been cut from the UFC in late 2018.

=== Legacy Fighting Alliance ===
Moreno signed a multi-fight contract with the Legacy Fighting Alliance and made his promotional debut against the prevailing Flyweight Champion Maikel Perez at LFA 69 on June 7, 2019. Moreno won the fight via technical knockout in the fourth round.

=== Return to UFC ===
Moreno returned to the UFC in a bout against promotional newcomer Askar Askarov on September 21, 2019, at UFC Fight Night 159. The back-and-forth bout ended in a split draw. 12 out of 13 media outlets scored the bout for Moreno.

Moreno faced Kai Kara-France on December 14, 2019, at UFC 245. He won the fight by unanimous decision.

Moreno faced Jussier Formiga on March 14, 2020, at UFC Fight Night 170. He won the fight via unanimous decision.

As the first bout of his new contract, Moreno was expected to face Alex Perez on November 21, 2020, at UFC 255. However, on October 2, it was announced that Cody Garbrandt, who was scheduled to fight Deiveson Figueiredo for the UFC Flyweight Championship at the event, pulled out due to a torn bicep and was replaced by Perez. Moreno instead faced Brandon Royval. He won the fight via technical knockout in round one.

==== UFC Flyweight Championship ====
Just three weeks removed from his last fight, Moreno faced Deiveson Figueiredo for the UFC Flyweight Championship on December 12, 2020, at UFC 256. After five rounds of frenetic back-and-forth fighting in which Figueiredo was deducted 1 point in the third round due to a groin strike, the bout was declared a majority draw. 13 out of 27 media outlets scored the bout for Figueiredo while 14 out of the 27 outlets scored the bout as a draw. This fight earned both athletes the Fight of the Night award.

Moreno rematched Figueiredo for the UFC Flyweight Championship on June 12, 2021, co-headlining UFC 263. Moreno dominated the striking and grappling exchanges and submitted Figueiredo with a rear naked choke in the third round, becoming the first Mexican UFC champion in the process. This win earned him the Performance of the Night award.

The trilogy rematch with Figueiredo for the UFC Flyweight Championship was scheduled to take place on December 11, 2021, at UFC 269 initially, but was moved to UFC 270 as the co-main event. He lost the fight and the title via unanimous decision. This fight earned him the Fight of the Night award.

Moreno next faced Kai Kara-France in a rematch for the interim UFC Flyweight Championship on July 30, 2022, at UFC 277. He won the fight via TKO in the third round. The win also earned Moreno his third Fight of the Night award. Moreno received Crypto.com "Fan Bonus of the Night" awards paid in bitcoin of US$20,000 for second place.

A fourth bout between Moreno and Deiveson Figueiredo for the undisputed UFC Flyweight Championship took place on January 21, 2023, at UFC 283, marking the first time in UFC history that two fighters fought each other for a fourth time. Moreno won the bout and undisputed title via technical knockout just before the fourth round after the ringside doctor stopped the fight due to Figueiredo's eye swelling shut.

Moreno faced Alexandre Pantoja in a rematch on July 8, 2023, at UFC 290. Moreno came out on the losing end via split decision, losing the title. 25 out of 30 media outlets scored the bout for Pantoja. This fight earned him the Fight of the Night award.

==== Post championship ====
Moreno was expected to face Amir Albazi at UFC Fight Night 237 on February 24, 2024. However, Albazi withdrew due to a neck injury and was replaced by former title challenger Brandon Royval. In a competitive bout, Moreno lost by split decision. 13 out of 18 media outlets scored the bout for Royval.

It was reported that the bout between Moreno and Amir Albazi was rescheduled to take place on November 9, 2024, in the main event at UFC Fight Night 247. However, the bout was moved to November 2, 2024, at UFC Fight Night 246. Moreno won the fight by unanimous decision.

Moreno faced former UFC Flyweight Championship challenger Steve Erceg in the main event on April 5, 2025, at UFC on ESPN 64 in Mexico City. He won the fight by unanimous decision.

Moreno faced former Shooto Flyweight Champion Tatsuro Taira on December 6, 2025, at UFC 323. He lost the fight via technical knockout in the second round, marking his first career stoppage loss.

Moreno was scheduled to face Asu Almabayev in the main event on February 28, 2026, at UFC Fight Night 268. However, Almabayev withdrew due to a hand injury and was replaced by Lone'er Kavanagh. Moreno lost the fight by unanimous decision.

Moreno faced Joseph Morales on September 12, 2026, at UFC Fight Night 288. He won the fight by split decision. 6 out of 9 media outlets scored the bout for Morales.

Moreno is scheduled to face Charles Johnson on December 12, 2026, at UFC 335.

== Submission grappling career ==
Moreno competed at the first Combat Jiu-Jitsu Fight Night on February 22, 2019, in the bantamweight tournament. In the opening round, Moreno submitted Ryan Carroll via D'arce choke, then defeated Beau Brooks by TKO via strikes in the semi-finals. In the finals, Moreno faced Richard Alarcon. The bout went into overtime, where Alarcon defeated Moreno via fastest escape time.

== Personal life ==
Moreno is a big fan of Funko Pop and is a dedicated Lego collector. He and his wife have three daughters.

Moreno hosts Entre Asaltos, a Spanish-language MMA podcast.

== Championships and accomplishments ==
=== Mixed martial arts ===
- Ultimate Fighting Championship
  - UFC Flyweight Championship (Two times)
    - First Mexican champion in UFC history
  - Interim UFC Flyweight Championship (One time)
    - Tied (Deiveson Figueiredo & Joshua Van) for third most title fight wins in UFC Flyweight division history (3)
  - Fight of the Night (Four times) vs. Deiveson Figueiredo 1 & 3, Kai Kara-France 2 and Alexandre Pantoja 2
    - Second most Fight of the Night bonuses in UFC Flyweight division history (5) (behind Brandon Royval)
  - Performance of the Night (Three times) vs. Dustin Ortiz, Louis Smolka and Deiveson Figueiredo 2
    - Tied (Brandon Royval & Alexandre Pantoja) for second most Post-Fight bonuses in UFC Flyweight division history (7) (behind Demetrious Johnson)
  - Tied (Joseph Benavidez, Tatsuro Taira & Manel Kape) for fourth most finishes in UFC Flyweight division history (6)
  - Most bouts in UFC Flyweight division history (21)
  - Most total fight time in UFC Flyweight division history (5:55:52)
  - Second longest average fight time in UFC Flyweight division history (16:57)
  - Fourth most wins in UFC Flyweight division history (12)
  - Second most significant strikes landed in UFC Flyweight division history (1375) (behind Joshua Van)
    - Third most total strikes landed in UFC Flyweight division history (1748)
  - Fifth most top position time in UFC Flyweight division history (47:07)
  - Fourth most control time in UFC Flyweight division history (1:04:15)
  - UFC Honors Awards
    - 2020: President's Choice Fight of the Year Nominee vs. Deiveson Figueiredo 1
    - 2021: Fan's Choice Submission of the Year Winner vs. Deiveson Figueiredo 2 & President's Choice Performance of the Year Nominee vs. Deiveson Figueiredo 2
    - 2023: President's Choice Fight of the Year Nominee vs. Alexandre Pantoja 2
  - UFC.com Awards
    - 2016: Ranked #5 Newcomer of the Year & Ranked #4 Upset of the Year vs. Louis Smolka
    - 2020: Ranked #7 Fighter of the Year & Ranked #2 Fight of the Year vs. Deiveson Figueiredo 1
    - 2021: Ranked #7 Fighter of the Year & Ranked #4 Submission of the Year vs. Deiveson Figueiredo 2
    - 2022: Ranked #6 Fight of the Year vs. Deiveson Figueiredo 3
    - 2023: Ranked #2 Fight of the Year vs. Alexandre Pantoja 2
- World Fighting Federation
  - WFF Flyweight Champion (One time)
- Legacy Fighting Alliance
  - LFA Flyweight Championship (One time)
- New York Post
  - 2023 Fight of the Year vs. Alexandre Pantoja 2 at UFC 290
- MMA Junkie
  - 2020 December Fight of the Month vs. Deiveson Figueiredo
  - 2021 June Submission of the Month vs. Deiveson Figueiredo
  - 2022 January Fight of the Month vs. Deiveson Figueiredo
- World MMA Awards
  - 2021 Breakthrough Fighter of the Year
  - 2021 Fight of the Year vs. Deiveson Figueiredo at UFC 256
  - 2021 Fighting Spirit of the Year for perseverance - from being cut, to fighting back and becoming the first Mexican UFC champion

Voting period for 2021 awards ran through July 2020 to July 2021 due to the COVID-19 pandemic.

- MMA Fighting
  - 2022 First Team MMA All-Star
- CBS Sports
  - 2020 #2 Ranked UFC Fight of the Year vs. Deiveson Figueiredo
- Bleacher Report
  - 2023 #2 Ranked UFC Fight of the Year vs. Alexandre Pantoja 2 at UFC 290
- Combat Press
  - 2023 Fight of the Year vs. Alexandre Pantoja 2 at UFC 290
- Slacky Awards
  - 2021 Technical Turn-Around of the Year

=== Submission grappling ===
- EBI Combat Jiu-Jitsu
  - Combat Jiu-Jitsu Fight Night 1 bantamweight tournament - 2nd place

== Mixed martial arts record ==
Professional record breakdown
36 matches	24 wins	10 losses
By knockout	5	1
By submission	11	0
By decision	8	9
Draws	2	

Res.	Record	Opponent	Method	Event	Date	Round	Time	Location	Notes
Win	24–10–2	Joseph Morales	Decision (split)	UFC Fight Night: Silva vs. Delgado	September 12, 2026	3	5:00	Glendale, Arizona, United States	
Loss	23–10–2	Lone'er Kavanagh	Decision (unanimous)	UFC Fight Night: Moreno vs. Kavanagh	February 28, 2026	5	5:00	Mexico City, Mexico	
Loss	23–9–2	Tatsuro Taira	TKO (punches)	UFC 323	December 6, 2025	2	2:24	Las Vegas, Nevada, United States	
Win	23–8–2	Steve Erceg	Decision (unanimous)	UFC on ESPN: Moreno vs. Erceg	March 29, 2025	5	5:00	Mexico City, Mexico	
Win	22–8–2	Amir Albazi	Decision (unanimous)	UFC Fight Night: Moreno vs. Albazi	November 2, 2024	5	5:00	Edmonton, Alberta, Canada	
Loss	21–8–2	Brandon Royval	Decision (split)	UFC Fight Night: Moreno vs. Royval 2	February 24, 2024	5	5:00	Mexico City, Mexico	
Loss	21–7–2	Alexandre Pantoja	Decision (split)	UFC 290	July 8, 2023	5	5:00	Las Vegas, Nevada, United States	Lost the UFC Flyweight Championship. Fight of the Night.
Win	21–6–2	Deiveson Figueiredo	TKO (doctor stoppage)	UFC 283	January 21, 2023	3	5:00	Rio de Janeiro, Brazil	Won and unified the UFC Flyweight Championship.
Win	20–6–2	Kai Kara-France	TKO (body kick and punches)	UFC 277	July 30, 2022	3	4:34	Dallas, Texas, United States	Won the interim UFC Flyweight Championship. Fight of the Night.
Loss	19–6–2	Deiveson Figueiredo	Decision (unanimous)	UFC 270	January 22, 2022	5	5:00	Anaheim, California, United States	Lost the UFC Flyweight Championship. Fight of the Night.
Win	19–5–2	Deiveson Figueiredo	Submission (rear-naked choke)	UFC 263	June 12, 2021	3	2:26	Glendale, Arizona, United States	Won the UFC Flyweight Championship. Performance of the Night.
Draw	18–5–2	Deiveson Figueiredo	Draw (majority)	UFC 256	December 12, 2020	5	5:00	Las Vegas, Nevada, United States	For the UFC Flyweight Championship. Figueiredo was deducted one point in round 3 due to a groin strike. Fight of the Night.
Win	18–5–1	Brandon Royval	TKO (punches)	UFC 255	November 21, 2020	1	4:59	Las Vegas, Nevada, United States	
Win	17–5–1	Jussier Formiga	Decision (unanimous)	UFC Fight Night: Lee vs. Oliveira	March 14, 2020	3	5:00	Brasília, Brazil	
Win	16–5–1	Kai Kara-France	Decision (unanimous)	UFC 245	December 14, 2019	3	5:00	Las Vegas, Nevada, United States	
Draw	15–5–1	Askar Askarov	Draw (split)	UFC Fight Night: Rodríguez vs. Stephens	September 21, 2019	3	5:00	Mexico City, Mexico	
Win	15–5	Maikel Pérez	TKO (punches)	LFA 69	June 7, 2019	4	1:54	Cabazon, California, United States	Won the vacant LFA Flyweight Championship.
Loss	14–5	Alexandre Pantoja	Decision (unanimous)	UFC Fight Night: Maia vs. Usman	May 19, 2018	3	5:00	Santiago, Chile	
Loss	14–4	Sergio Pettis	Decision (unanimous)	UFC Fight Night: Pettis vs. Moreno	August 5, 2017	5	5:00	Mexico City, Mexico	
Win	14–3	Dustin Ortiz	Technical Submission (rear-naked choke)	UFC Fight Night: Swanson vs. Lobov	April 22, 2017	2	4:06	Nashville, Tennessee, United States	Performance of the Night.
Win	13–3	Ryan Benoit	Decision (split)	The Ultimate Fighter: Tournament of Champions Finale	December 3, 2016	3	5:00	Las Vegas, Nevada, United States	
Win	12–3	Louis Smolka	Submission (guillotine choke)	UFC Fight Night: Lineker vs. Dodson	October 1, 2016	1	2:23	Portland, Oregon, United States	Performance of the Night.
Win	11–3	Isaac Camarillo	Submission (rear-naked choke)	World Fighting Federation 27	April 16, 2016	1	1:53	Tucson, Arizona, United States	Defended the WFF Flyweight Championship.
Win	10–3	Tyler Bialeck	Submission (rear-naked choke)	World Fighting Federation 22	July 25, 2015	1	3:09	Tucson, Arizona, United States	Defended the WFF Flyweight Championship.
Win	9–3	Matt Betzold	Decision (unanimous)	World Fighting Federation 18	February 7, 2015	3	5:00	Chandler, Arizona, United States	Defended the WFF Flyweight Championship.
Win	8–3	C.J. Soliven	Submission (rear-naked choke)	World Fighting Federation 16	September 20, 2014	1	0:58	Chandler, Arizona, United States	Flyweight debut. Won the vacant WFF Flyweight Championship.
Win	7–3	Alex Contreras	Submission (triangle choke)	World Fighting Federation 14	June 28, 2014	3	1:04	Chandler, Arizona, United States	
Win	6–3	Paul Amaro	Submission (rear-naked choke)	MEZ Sports: Pandemonium 9	July 26, 2013	2	3:01	Mission Viejo, California, United States	
Win	5–3	Jason Carbajal	TKO (punches)	MEZ Sports: Pandemonium 8	March 23, 2013	3	1:52	Pomona, California, United States	
Win	4–3	Jesse Cruz	Decision (split)	Xplode Fight Series: Anarchy	September 22, 2012	3	3:00	Valley Center, California, United States	
Loss	3–3	Brenson Hansen	Decision (unanimous)	Chaos in the Cage 11	July 28, 2012	3	5:00	Biloxi, Mississippi, United States	
Win	3–2	Jonathan Carter	Submission (armbar)	Xplode Fight Series: Hunted	May 19, 2012	1	1:15	Valley Center, California, United States	
Loss	2–2	Ron Scolesdang	Decision (unanimous)	MEZ Sports: Pandemonium 6	March 3, 2012	3	5:00	Riverside, California, United States	
Win	2–1	Luis Garcia	Submission (armbar)	UWC Mexico: New Blood 1	January 29, 2012	1	2:21	Tijuana, Mexico	
Loss	1–1	Marco Beristain	Decision (unanimous)	UWC Mexico 10	June 25, 2011	3	5:00	Tijuana, Mexico	
Win	1–0	Atiq Jihad	Submission (armbar)	UWC Mexico 9.5	April 30, 2011	1	2:30	Tijuana, Mexico	Bantamweight debut.

=== Mixed martial arts exhibition record ===
Exhibition record breakdown		
1 match	0 wins	1 loss
By submission	0	1

Res.	Record	Opponent	Method	Event	Date	Round	Time	Location	Notes
Loss	0–1	Alexandre Pantoja	Submission (rear-naked choke)	The Ultimate Fighter: Tournament of Champions	August 31, 2016	2	3:44	Las Vegas, Nevada, United States	TUF 24 Round of 16

*Date given is the air date of the episode. The actual dates of the fight are not released by the UFC

== Pay-per-view bouts ==
No	Event	Fight	Date	Venue	City	PPV buys
1.	UFC 256	Figueiredo vs. Moreno	December 12, 2020	UFC Apex	Enterprise, Nevada, United States	Not Disclosed

== See also ==
- List of current UFC fighters
- List of male mixed martial artists
- List of Mexican UFC fighters

Achievements
Preceded by Deiveson Figueiredo	4th UFC Flyweight Champion; 12 June 2021 – 22 January 2022	Succeeded by Deiveson Figueiredo
New title	1st UFC Interim Flyweight Champion; 30 July 2022 – 21 January 2023	Vacant
Preceded by Deiveson Figueiredo	6th UFC Flyweight Champion; 21 January 2023 – 8 July 2023	Succeeded by Alexandre Pantoja
