= UFC 255 =

UFC mixed martial arts event in 2020

UFC 255: Figueiredo vs. Perez
- The poster for UFC 255: Figueiredo vs. Perez
- Promotion: Ultimate Fighting Championship
- Date: November 21, 2020
- Venue: UFC Apex
- City: Enterprise, Nevada, United States
- Attendance: None (behind closed doors)

Event chronology
UFC Fight Night: Felder vs. dos Anjos	UFC 255: Figueiredo vs. Perez	UFC on ESPN: Smith vs. Clark

UFC 255: Figueiredo vs. Perez was a mixed martial arts event produced by the Ultimate Fighting Championship that took place on November 21, 2020 at the UFC Apex facility in Enterprise, Nevada, part of the Las Vegas Metropolitan Area, United States.

== Background ==
A UFC Flyweight Championship bout between current champion Deiveson Figueiredo and former UFC Bantamweight Champion Cody Garbrandt was expected to serve as the event headliner. However, it was announced on October 2 that Garbrandt pulled out due to a torn bicep and was replaced by Alex Perez, who was already scheduled to face Brandon Moreno at the event. Moreno faced Brandon Royval instead.

A UFC Women's Flyweight Championship bout between current champion Valentina Shevchenko and Jennifer Maia co-headlined the event.

John Allan and Roman Dolidze were originally scheduled to meet at this event in a light heavyweight bout. They were eventually rescheduled for UFC on ESPN: Hermansson vs. Vettori in December.

Former UFC Welterweight Champion Robbie Lawler was expected to face Mike Perry at this event. However, Lawler pulled out of the fight in late October citing an undisclosed injury. He was replaced by Tim Means.

A welterweight bout between Orion Cosce and Nicolas Dalby was expected to take place at this event. However, Cosce pulled out on November 12 due to undisclosed reasons and was replaced by Daniel Rodriguez.

At the weigh-ins, Perry weighed in at 175.5 pounds, four and a half pounds over the welterweight non-title fight limit. His bout proceeded at a catchweight and he was fined 30% of his individual purse, which went to his opponent Tim Means.

== Results ==
Main card
Weight class				Method	Round	Time	Notes
Flyweight	Deiveson Figueiredo (c)	def.	Alex Perez	Submission (guillotine choke)	1	1:57	(Note: For the UFC Flyweight Championship.)
Women's Flyweight	Valentina Shevchenko (c)	def.	Jennifer Maia	Decision (unanimous) (49–46, 49–46, 49–46)	5	5:00	(Note: For the UFC Women's Flyweight Championship.)
Catchweight (175.5 lb)	Tim Means	def.	Mike Perry	Decision (unanimous) (30–27, 29–28, 29–28)	3	5:00
Women's Flyweight	Katlyn Chookagian	def.	Cynthia Calvillo	Decision (unanimous) (30–27, 30–27, 30–27)	3	5:00
Light Heavyweight	Paul Craig	def.	Maurício Rua	TKO (submission to punches)	2	3:36
Preliminary card (ESPN2 / ESPN+)
Flyweight	Brandon Moreno	def.	Brandon Royval	TKO (punches)	1	4:59
Middleweight	Joaquin Buckley	def.	Jordan Wright	KO (punches)	2	0:18
Women's Flyweight	Antonina Shevchenko	def.	Ariane Lipski	TKO (punches)	2	4:33
Welterweight	Nicolas Dalby	def.	Daniel Rodriguez	Decision (unanimous) (30–27, 29–28, 29–28)	3	5:00
Early preliminary card (ESPN2 / ESPN+ / UFC Fight Pass)
Welterweight	Alan Jouban	def.	Jared Gooden	Decision (unanimous) (30–27, 30–27, 30–27)	3	5:00
Middleweight	Kyle Daukaus	def.	Dustin Stoltzfus	Decision (unanimous) (30–27, 30–27, 30–26)	3	5:00
Welterweight	Sasha Palatnikov	def.	Louis Cosce	TKO (punches)	3	2:27

== Bonus awards ==
The following fighters received $50,000 bonuses.

- Fight of the Night: Sasha Palatnikov vs. Louis Cosce
- Performance of the Night: Joaquin Buckley and Antonina Shevchenko

== See also ==
- List of UFC events
- List of current UFC fighters
- 2020 in UFC
