= Demetrious Johnson =

American mixed martial artist (born 1986)

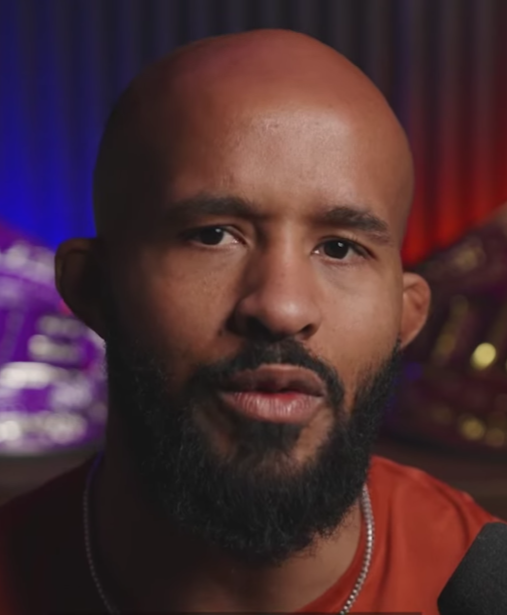
- Johnson in 2024
- Born: Demetrious Khrisna Johnson; August 13, 1986 (age 40); Madisonville, Kentucky, U.S.
- Nickname: Mighty Mouse
- Height: 5 ft 3 in (160 cm)
- Weight: 135 lb (61 kg; 9 st 9 lb)
- Division: Flyweight (2012–2018); Bantamweight (Note: While competing for ONE Championship, Johnson competes at 135 lbs (61.2 kg). ONE Championship refers to their 135 lb weight class as Flyweight, but per the Association of Boxing Commissions in the United States, 135 lbs is considered Bantamweight.) (2007–2011, 2019–2024); Featherweight (grappling, 2023-present)
- Reach: 66 in (168 cm)
- Stance: Orthodox
- Fighting out of: Parkland, Washington, U.S.
- Team: AMC Pankration; Evolve MMA
- Trainer: Matt Hume; Brad Kertson
- Rank: Black belt in Brazilian Jiu-Jitsu under Bibiano Fernandes and Yan McCane
- Years active: 2006–2023

Mixed martial arts record
- Total: 30
- Wins: 25
- By knockout: 5
- By submission: 8
- By decision: 12
- Losses: 4
- By knockout: 1
- By decision: 3
- Draws: 1

Amateur record
- Total: 9
- Wins: 9
- By knockout: 2
- By submission: 5

Other information
- University: Pierce College
- Notable school: Washington High School
- Mixed martial arts record from Sherdog

Current team
- Team: Method Gaming
- Role: Damage dealer
- Game: World of Warcraft

Esports career information
- Playing career: 2017–2024
- Handle: Mighty Mouse

Team history
- 2017: Method Gaming

YouTube information
- Channel: Mighty15x
- Subscribers: 1.7 million
- Views: 615 million
- Last updated: June 18, 2026

Demetrious Khrisna Johnson (born August 13, 1986) is an American former professional mixed martial artist. He competed in the Flyweight division of the Ultimate Fighting Championship (UFC), where he was the inaugural and former UFC Flyweight Champion (125 lbs) with a record of 11 consecutive title defenses. Johnson most recently competed in ONE Championship, where he is the former ONE Flyweight Champion (135 lb), and was the 2019 ONE Flyweight World Grand Prix Champion. He holds the record for most consecutive wins in UFC flyweight history with 13. Johnson is widely regarded as one of the greatest mixed martial artists of all time.

ESPN, MMA Weekly, and various UFC personnel have called Johnson one of the greatest mixed martial artists in the world. Johnson has been referred to by many as ‘the greatest Flyweight (125 pound) Mixed Martial Arts fighter of all time’ with a record of 25 wins and 4 losses in professional MMA, and 36 wins and 4 losses including amateur and mixed rules bouts. At 125 pounds he only ever lost a single bout, a controversial split decision to Henry Cejudo, whom he knocked out in their other bout. He also held titles and notable ranked wins at 135 pounds, though also picked up 3 losses in that division.

On March 28, 2026, Johnson and family were in attendance for UFC Fight Night 271 as he was announced to join the Modern Wing of UFC Hall of Fame.

== Early years ==
Born in Kentucky, Johnson grew up in Parkland, Washington, where he attended Washington High School and was a stand-out athlete in wrestling, track, and cross country. In 2004, Johnson's junior year of high school he qualified for the state wrestling tournament placing 2nd at 119lbs. In 2005, Johnson's senior year of high school he qualified for the state wrestling tournament placing 3rd at 119lbs. Although he only participated in track and cross country to improve his cardio for wrestling, he competed at the state championships in both of those sports as well. Johnson did receive scholarship offers for wrestling, but did not want to leave his family behind. Ultimately, he did not take up any scholarship offers and instead attended Pierce College for two years while working on the side.

== Mixed martial arts career ==
=== Early career ===
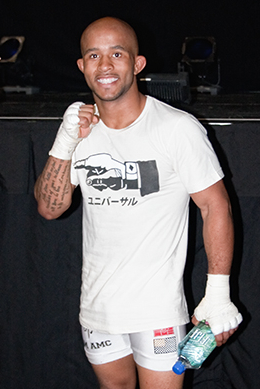
Johnson in 2009

Johnson originally began training in mixed martial arts (MMA) as a hobby, continuing for two years before being invited to AMC Pankration, where he would meet MMA pioneer Matt Hume, who had been scouting Johnson and organized the event where Johnson made his MMA debut. He began his career in MMA as an amateur in 2006, winning via first-round knockout. Johnson then appeared on multiple local shows and won his next 8 fights, including five in a row by submission, for a final amateur record of 9–0.

After winning his professional debut, Johnson fought at the Alaska Fighting Championships in Anchorage and won via head kick KO, which earned him a deal with the WEC.

=== World Extreme Cagefighting ===
He made his World Extreme Cagefighting debut at bantamweight against Brad Pickett on April 24, 2010, at WEC 48 in Sacramento, California. Johnson showed good kickboxing throughout but was unable to defend the many takedowns executed by Pickett. Johnson lost via unanimous decision. Joe Rogan predicted during the fight that, should the WEC implement a flyweight division, Johnson would be highly effective, as he was a relatively small bantamweight.

Johnson was expected to face Clint Godfrey on September 30, 2010, at WEC 51. However, Godfrey was forced off the card and replaced by WEC newcomer Nick Pace. Johnson defeated Pace via unanimous decision, handing Pace his first MMA loss.

Johnson defeated Damacio Page via third-round submission on November 11, 2010, at WEC 52. After Page controlled the action in the first round, Johnson was able to dictate the action for most of the second and third rounds before submitting Page via guillotine choke. Johnson later said, "He was basically drowning, and I was the shark that came up and got him from underneath."

=== Ultimate Fighting Championship ===
==== Bantamweight competition (2011–2012) ====
On October 28, 2010, World Extreme Cagefighting merged with the Ultimate Fighting Championship. As part of the merger, all WEC fighters were transferred to the UFC. Johnson faced Japanese fighter Norifumi "KID" Yamamoto on February 5, 2011, at UFC 126 in his UFC debut, Johnson won via unanimous decision.

Johnson was scheduled to face Renan Barão on May 28, 2011, at UFC 130. However, Johnson faced Miguel Torres after Torres's opponent, Brad Pickett, was forced off the card with an injury. Despite breaking his fibula early in the second round from a checked leg kick, Johnson used his superior wrestling to control Torres and won a 29–28 unanimous decision victory, even though he was swept into full mount a record-breaking 6 times during the fight.

Johnson fought Dominick Cruz on October 1, 2011, at UFC Live: Cruz vs. Johnson for the UFC bantamweight title, losing by unanimous decision. Johnson was briefly linked to a bout with Eddie Wineland on January 28, 2012, at the UFC's second event on Fox. However, Johnson was pulled from the bout to take part in a four-man flyweight tournament to determine the UFC's first UFC Flyweight Champion.

Johnson faced Ian McCall on March 3, 2012, in the first round of the Flyweight Tournament at UFC on FX 2. This fight was the first flyweight bout in UFC history. The fight with McCall was announced as a majority decision win for Johnson. Later, in the post-fight press conference, UFC president Dana White announced that the athletic commission made a mistake when scoring the match and that officially the bout was scored a majority draw (28–28, 29–29, and 29–28 Johnson). A rematch with McCall took place on June 8, 2012, at UFC on FX: Johnson vs. McCall. Johnson won the fight via unanimous decision to progress to the final round of the tournament.

==== UFC Flyweight Champion (2012–2018) ====
Johnson faced Joseph Benavidez in the finals of the UFC Flyweight Tournament on September 22, 2012, at UFC 152. Johnson defeated Benavidez via split decision to become the inaugural UFC Flyweight Champion.

Johnson fought John Dodson on January 26, 2013, at UFC on Fox: Johnson vs. Dodson. Johnson won the fight via unanimous decision in a bout that earned both participants Fight of the Night honors.

Johnson was expected to face John Moraga on April 13, 2013, at The Ultimate Fighter 17 Finale. However, Johnson was forced out of the bout with an injury, and Moraga was pulled from the event as well. The bout with Moraga eventually took place on July 27, 2013, at UFC on Fox: Johnson vs. Moraga, where Johnson was looking to defend his title for a second time. Johnson won via an armbar submission late in the fifth round. The win also earned Johnson his first Submission of the Night bonus award.

A rematch with Joseph Benavidez was expected for November 30, 2013, at The Ultimate Fighter 18 Finale. However, the bout was moved to December 14, 2013, at UFC on Fox 9 after that event's headliner was postponed due to injury. Johnson won the rematch in emphatic fashion via knockout in the first round, becoming the first person to stop Benavidez. The win also earned Johnson his first Knockout of the Night bonus award. Johnson faced Ali Bagautinov on June 14, 2014, at UFC 174. He successfully defended his title for a fourth time, winning by unanimous decision. Subsequent to his win, on July 10, the British Columbia Athletic Commission (BCAC) announced that Bagautinov tested positive for erythropoietin (EPO) prior to the title fight. In response, the BCAC suspended Bagautinov from mixed martial arts competition for one year.

A bout with Chris Cariaso was expected on August 30, 2014, at UFC 177. However, the bout was shifted to September 27, 2014, at UFC 178 after that event's headliner was cancelled due to injury. Johnson won the fight via submission due to a kimura in the second round. This marked Johnson's fifth title defense and the first time that a kimura was used to end a fight in a UFC championship title bout. Johnson faced Kyoji Horiguchi at UFC 186, winning the one-sided fight via an armbar submission at 4:59 of the fifth round, resulting in the latest finish in UFC history. This win also secured Johnson a Performance of the Night bonus award.

A rematch with John Dodson took place on September 5, 2015, at UFC 191. In a largely one-sided affair, Johnson won the fight via unanimous decision. Johnson faced Olympic Gold Medalist Henry Cejudo on April 23, 2016, at UFC 197. He won the fight via TKO in the first round after dropping Cejudo with a variety of strikes. The win earned Johnson his second Performance of the Night bonus. Johnson next faced Tim Elliott on December 3, 2016, at The Ultimate Fighter 24 Finale. Despite being a heavy favorite, Johnson was taken down for the first time as a flyweight and nearly submitted with a d'arce choke in the first round. He went on to win the remaining rounds, and defended the Championship via a decisive unanimous decision.

Johnson faced Wilson Reis on April 15, 2017, at UFC on Fox 24. He won by armbar submission in the third round and subsequently received a Performance of the Night bonus. With the win, Johnson tied Anderson Silva for most consecutive title defenses (ten) in UFC history. In July 2017, Johnson won an ESPY Award for Fighter of The Year.

Johnson was briefly linked to an August 2017 fight with T.J. Dillashaw. He was scheduled to face Ray Borg on September 9, 2017, at UFC 215. In turn, the fight was canceled a day before the event, as Borg was forced to withdraw from the fight on Thursday evening due to illness. According to multiple sources, Borg has been battling an illness that week and was deemed unfit to fight by UFC doctors. The bout was quickly rescheduled and took place at UFC 216. Johnson won the fight via suplex-to-armbar in the fifth round. This win earned him the Performance of the Night award and set the 11th successful title defense record, surpassing former middleweight champion Anderson Silva's record of 10 in the UFC. Johnson's win was called the best submission of the year from publications such as Sherdog, MMA Mania.com, and The MAC Life.

Johnson faced Cejudo in a rematch at UFC 227 on August 4, 2018, for the UFC Flyweight Championship title. After a record 11 consecutive successful title defenses, Johnson's championship reign came to an end via a split decision loss to Cejudo. This fight earned him the Fight of the Night award. 13 of 25 media outlets scored the bout in favor of Cejudo, while 12 scored it for Johnson.

==== Hall of Fame (2026) ====
During UFC Fight Night 271's broadcast in March 2026, Johnson was announced as the next "modern wing" inductee into the UFC Hall of Fame, with the ceremony scheduled for International Fight Week in Las Vegas on July 9, 2026.

=== ONE Championship ===
On October 27, 2018, Johnson was traded to ONE Championship for former ONE Welterweight Champion Ben Askren. Johnson was expected to make his promotional debut in the first quarter of 2019.

==== ONE Flyweight Grand Prix ====
On November 7, 2018, it was announced that Johnson would be one of eight participants in the ONE Flyweight World Grand Prix. On December 19, 2018, it was announced that Johnson will be facing Yuya Wakamatsu at ONE Championship: A New Era on March 31, 2019, in the promotion's inaugural event in Japan.

In his ONE Championship debut, Johnson defeated Yuya Wakamatsu via a guillotine choke submission in the second round.

Johnson's second ONE Championship fight took place at ONE Championship: Dawn of Heroes on August 2, 2019. He faced Tatsumitsu Wada in the semi-finals of the ONE Flyweight Grand Prix and won the fight by unanimous decision to advance to the finals.

Johnson then faced Danny Kingad at ONE Championship: Century in the finals of the ONE Championship Flyweight Grand-Prix on October 12, 2019. He defeated Kingad in a dominant unanimous decision victory and became the ONE Flyweight World Grand Prix Champion.

==== ONE Flyweight title shot ====
After claiming the Grand Prix victory, Johnson was set to challenge ONE Flyweight Champion Adriano Moraes at Infinity 1. The fight was postponed due to the COVID-19 pandemic.

Johnson faced Moraes at ONE on TNT 1 on April 7, 2021. The event was held at the Singapore Indoor Stadium in Kallang, Singapore and was broadcast on TNT during US prime time. He lost the bout via KO in round two by a knee and punches.

==== Special-rules fight with Rodtang Jitmuangnon ====
On September 15, 2021, it was announced that Johnson would fight Rodtang Jitmuangnon, the reigning ONE Flyweight Muay Thai World Champion and considered by many to be the current best pound-for-pound Muay Thai fighter. The fight was contested under special rules, with rounds 1 and 3 being fought under the ONE Muay Thai ruleset, and rounds 2 and 4 being fought under the ONE MMA ruleset. However, due to the pandemic shutdowns, the event was rescheduled for ONE: X on March 26, 2022. Johnson won the bout via a rear-naked choke submission in the second round.

==== ONE Flyweight Champion (2022–2023) ====
On June 2, 2022, it was reported that Johnson would rematch Adriano Moraes for the ONE Flyweight Championship at ONE on Prime Video 1. Johnson would go on to defeat Moraes by knockout via a flying knee in the fourth round to capture the ONE Flyweight Championship. This win earned him the Performance of the Night award.

The trilogy bout between Johnson and Moraes was held on May 5, 2023, at ONE Fight Night 10. Johnson won the bout by unanimous decision.

Johnson announced his retirement from the sport on September 6, 2024, at ONE 168. Following his retirement speech, ONE CEO Chatri Sityodtong announced that Johnson was the first inductee into the ONE Hall of Fame.

== Grappling career ==
Johnson entered the IBJJF Master World Championship on August 31, 2023, to compete in the brown belt Master 2 featherweight (154 pound) division. Johnson defeated 6 opponents and won a gold medal at the event.

Johnson then competed at the IBJJF Pan Championship 2024 on March 22–25, 2024, winning a gold medal in the brown belt Master 2 featherweight division and a silver medal in the brown belt Master 2 absolute division.

Johnson competed for the first time as a black belt in the IBJJF Master World Championship on August 30, 2024, in the black belt Master 2 featherweight division. He won his first three matches and made it to the quarter-final before being submitted for the first time in jiu-jitsu competition. He returned to compete in the same division of the IBJJF Pan Championship 2025, losing on points in the opening round.

== Fighting style ==
UFC commentator Joe Rogan, ESPN.com, and other media outlets have called Johnson the greatest mixed martial artist in the world. Known as one of the fastest fighters in MMA, Johnson's martial arts background is in wrestling, which he uses effectively to control where the fight takes place and land numerous takedowns in a single match when necessary. In addition to his wrestling base, Johnson is also recognized for quick striking and elusive movement. He is noted for his ability to land fast punches and kicks to the head or body, then quickly escape an opponent's reach. He is also known for his ability to counterstrike while standing within the pocket. During upperbody clinches, Johnson has also utilized the Muay Thai plum while mixing in a series of elbows and knees. To complement his traditional wrestling base, Johnson is also schooled in catch wrestling under his long-time coach Matt Hume, as evident by his catch-style direct suplex-to-armlock transition against Ray Borg, and his double wrist lock submission (aka Kimura) of Chris Cariaso.

Johnson is known for cross-training and visiting other athletes to learn different techniques, like ADCC veteran and fellow ONE Championship fighter Garry Tonon.

== Personal life ==
Johnson had a harsh childhood; he was raised by his deaf mother and an abusive stepfather, and his sister attempted suicide when he was a teenager. Johnson met his biological father for the first time in 2017, and they have since developed a great relationship. The main thing that has helped him move on from his past is his wife, Destiny Johnson. He says "she is the best thing that has ever happened to me and without her, life would be incomplete." They were wed May 11, 2012, in Hawaii. They have two sons: Tyron, born in 2013, and Maverick Allen, born April 15, 2015, and a daughter named Tanith Lea, born August 2018.

Johnson is an avid gamer and streams via YouTube under the username Mighty, and via Twitch under the username MightyGaming.

On a podcast in February 2025, Johnson revealed that his sister is lesbian and that his brother is gay.

== Championships and accomplishments ==
=== Mixed martial arts ===
- ONE Championship
  - ONE Hall of Fame (inaugural inductee, 2024)
  - ONE Flyweight Championship (One time, former)
    - One successful title defense
  - 2019 ONE Flyweight World Grand Prix Champion
  - Performance of the Night (One time) vs. Adriano Moraes
  - 2022 MMA Knockout of the Year vs. Adriano Moraes at ONE on Prime Video 1
- Ultimate Fighting Championship
  - UFC Hall of Fame (Modern Wing, Class of 2026)
  - UFC Flyweight Championship (One time, inaugural)
    - Eleven successful title defenses
      - Most consecutive title defenses in UFC history (11)
        - Most consecutive title defenses in UFC flyweight division history (11)
      - Second most successful title defenses in UFC history (11) (behind Jon Jones)
      - Longest title reign in UFC Flyweight division history (2142 days)
    - Most wins in UFC flyweight title fights (12)
    - Third most wins in UFC title fights (12)
    - Most UFC flyweight title fights (13)
      - Fourth most UFC title fights (14)
    - Most submissions in UFC title fights (5)
    - Fourth most finishes in UFC title fights (7)
  - UFC Flyweight Championship Tournament Winner
  - Fight of the Night (Three times) vs. Ian McCall, John Dodson, and Henry Cejudo
  - Knockout of the Night (One time) vs. Joseph Benavidez
  - Submission of the Night (One time) vs. John Moraga
  - Performance of the Night (Four times) vs. Kyoji Horiguchi, Henry Cejudo, Wilson Reis, and Ray Borg
    - Second fighter on UFC roster to be awarded bonus payments in all four possible categories (Fight, Knockout, Performance & Submission of the Night awards)
    - Most post-fight bonuses in UFC Flyweight division history (9)
  - Most consecutive wins in UFC Flyweight division history (13)
    - Tied (Jon Jones, Georges St-Pierre, Max Holloway & Khabib Nurmagomedov) for fifth longest win streak in UFC history (13)
    - Fifth longest unbeaten streak in UFC history (14)
  - Tied (Joseph Benavidez) for second most wins in UFC Flyweight division history (13) (behind Alexandre Pantoja)
  - Tied (Deiveson Figueiredo) for second most finishes in UFC Flyweight division history (7) (behind Alexandre Pantoja)
  - Second for most submission wins in UFC Flyweight division history (5) (behind Alexandre Pantoja)
  - Second most total fight time in UFC Flyweight division history (4:39:12) (behind Brandon Moreno)
  - Longest average fight-time in UFC Flyweight division history (18:37)
    - Second longest average fight time in UFC history (18:34)
  - Most control time in UFC Flyweight division history (1:26:54)
  - Third most significant strikes landed in UFC Flyweight division history (1059) (behind Brandon Moreno)
  - Second highest significant strike percentage in UFC Flyweight division history (57.2%) (behind Joshua Van)
  - Third highest significant strike differential in UFC Flyweight division history (2.01)
  - Highest significant strike defense percentage in UFC Flyweight division history (68.4%)
  - Fourth fewest number of strikes absorbed per minute in UFC Flyweight division history (1.78)
  - Fourth most total strikes landed in UFC Flyweight division history (1678)
  - Second most takedowns landed in UFC Flyweight division history (58)
    - Fifth most takedowns landed in UFC history (74)
    - Third & tied (Khamzat Chimaev) for fourth most takedowns landed in a UFC title fight (14 vs. Kyoji Horiguchi & 12 vs. John Moraga)
  - Tied (Royce Gracie) for most armbar submission wins in UFC history (4)
  - Sixth most bouts in UFC Flyweight division history (15)
  - Latest submission and finish in UFC history (4:59 in R5) vs. Kyoji Horiguchi
  - UFC.com Awards
    - 2011: Half-Year Awards: Best Newcomer of the 1HY & Ranked #7 Upset of the Year vs. Miguel Torres
    - 2012: Ranked #3 Fighter of the Year & Ranked #7 Fight of the Year vs. Joseph Benavidez 1
    - 2013: Ranked #2 Fighter of the Year, Ranked #7 Fight of the Year vs. John Dodson & Ranked #10 Knockout of the Year vs. Joseph Benavidez 2
    - 2015: Ranked #7 Fighter of the Year
    - 2017: Submission of the Year vs. Ray Borg, Ranked #3 Fighter of the Year & Ranked #8 Submission of the Year vs. Wilson Reis
- Business Insider
  - 2010s #40 Ranked Most Dominant Athlete of the Decade
- The Athletic
  - 2010s Men's Flyweight Fighter of the Decade
- BJPenn.com
  - 2010s #6 Ranked Fighter of the Decade
- MMA Sucka
  - 2017 Submission of the Year vs. Ray Borg at UFC 216
  - 2010s Fighter of the Decade
- Bloody Elbow
  - 2017 Fighter of the Year
  - 2017 Submission of the Year vs. Ray Borg at UFC 216
  - 2010s Flyweight Fighter of the Decade
- Black Belt magazine
  - 2019 MMA Fighter of the Year
- MMA Weekly
  - 2013 Fighter of the Year
- MMA Junkie
  - 2015 #3 Ranked Submission of the Year vs. Kyoji Horiguchi at UFC 186
  - 2015 April Submission of the Month vs. Kyoji Horiguchi at UFC 186
  - 2017 Submission of the Year vs. Ray Borg at UFC 216
  - 2017 October Submission of the Month vs. Ray Borg at UFC 216
  - 2022 August Knockout of the Month vs. Adriano Moraes at ONE on Prime Video 1
  - 2010s #2 Ranked Fighter of the Decade
- Inside MMA
  - 2012 Breakthrough Fighter of the Year
- Sherdog
  - 2013 All-Violence First Team
  - 2017 Submission of the Year vs. Ray Borg at UFC 216
- ESPY Awards
  - 2017 Fighter of The Year
- Fox Sports
  - 2013 Fighter of the Year
- Fight Matrix
  - 2013 Male Fighter of the Year
  - 2017 Male Fighter of the Year tied with Max Holloway
  - 2018 Most Noteworthy Match of the Year vs. Henry Cejudo II at UFC 227
- MMA Mania
  - UFC/MMA 'Fighter of the Year' 2017 – Top 5 List No. 3
  - UFC/MMA 'Submission of the Year' 2017 – Top 5 List No. 1 vs. Ray Borg at UFC 216
- Bleacher Report
  - 2012 #8 Ranked Fighter of the Year
  - 2013 Fighter of the Year
  - 2014 #8 Ranked Fighter of the Year
  - 2017 Fighter of the Year
  - 2017 Submission of the Year vs. Ray Borg at UFC 216
- ESPN
  - 2017 Submission of the Year vs. Ray Borg at UFC 216
  - #4 Ranked Men's MMA Fighter of the 21st Century
- Sports Illustrated
  - 2017 Fighter of the Year
- Yahoo Sports
  - 2017 Submission of the Year vs. Ray Borg at UFC 216
- Pundit Arena
  - 2017 Submission of the Year vs. Ray Borg at UFC 216
- MMA Fighting
  - 2017 Submission of the Year vs. Ray Borg at UFC 216
  - 2010s #4 Ranked Fighter of the Decade
  - #4 Ranked UFC Fighter of All Time
- Wrestling Observer Newsletter
  - 2017 Most Outstanding Fighter of the Year
- World MMA Awards
  - 2017 Submission of the Year vs. Ray Borg at UFC 216
- CBS Sports
  - 2017 #2 Ranked UFC Fighter of the Year
  - 2026 #1 Ranked American fighter in UFC history
- Combat Press
  - 2017 Submission of the Year vs. Ray Borg at UFC 216
- Cageside Press
  - 2017 Submission of the Year vs. Ray Borg at UFC 216

== Mixed martial arts record ==
Professional record breakdown
30 matches	25 wins	4 losses
By knockout	5	1
By submission	8	0
By decision	12	3
Draws	1	

Res.	Record	Opponent	Method	Event	Date	Round	Time	Location	Notes
Win	25–4–1	Adriano Moraes	Decision (unanimous)	ONE Fight Night 10	May 5, 2023	5	5:00	Broomfield, Colorado, United States	Defended the ONE Flyweight Championship (135 lb).
Win	24–4–1	Adriano Moraes	KO (flying knee)	ONE on Prime Video 1	August 27, 2022	4	3:50	Kallang, Singapore	Won the ONE Flyweight Championship (135 lb). Performance of the Night.
Loss	23–4–1	Adriano Moraes	KO (knee)	ONE on TNT 1	April 7, 2021	2	2:24	Kallang, Singapore	For the ONE Flyweight Championship (135 lb).
Win	23–3–1	Danny Kingad	Decision (unanimous)	ONE: Century – Part 1	October 13, 2019	3	5:00	Tokyo, Japan	Won the ONE Flyweight World Grand Prix.
Win	22–3–1	Tatsumitsu Wada	Decision (unanimous)	ONE: Dawn of Heroes	August 2, 2019	3	5:00	Pasay, Philippines	ONE Flyweight World Grand Prix Semifinal.
Win	21–3–1	Yuya Wakamatsu	Submission (guillotine choke)	ONE: A New Era	March 31, 2019	2	2:40	Tokyo, Japan	Return to 135 lb. ONE Flyweight World Grand Prix Quarterfinal.
Loss	20–3–1	Henry Cejudo	Decision (split)	UFC 227	August 4, 2018	5	5:00	Los Angeles, California, United States	Lost the UFC Flyweight Championship. Fight of the Night.
Win	20–2–1	Ray Borg	Submission (armbar)	UFC 216	October 7, 2017	5	3:15	Las Vegas, Nevada, United States	Defended the UFC Flyweight Championship. Broke the UFC record for the most consecutive title defenses (11). Performance of the Night. Submission of the Year.
Win	19–2–1	Wilson Reis	Submission (armbar)	UFC on Fox: Johnson vs. Reis	April 15, 2017	3	4:49	Kansas City, Missouri, United States	Defended the UFC Flyweight Championship. Performance of the Night.
Win	18–2–1	Tim Elliott	Decision (unanimous)	The Ultimate Fighter: Tournament of Champions Finale	December 3, 2016	5	5:00	Las Vegas, Nevada, United States	Defended the UFC Flyweight Championship.
Win	17–2–1	Henry Cejudo	TKO (knees to the body)	UFC 197	April 23, 2016	1	2:49	Las Vegas, Nevada, United States	Defended the UFC Flyweight Championship. Performance of the Night.
Win	16–2–1	John Dodson	Decision (unanimous)	UFC 191	September 5, 2015	5	5:00	Las Vegas, Nevada, United States	Defended the UFC Flyweight Championship.
Win	15–2–1	Kyoji Horiguchi	Submission (armbar)	UFC 186	April 25, 2015	5	4:59	Montreal, Quebec, Canada	Defended the UFC Flyweight Championship. Performance of the Night. Tied latest finish in UFC history.
Win	14–2–1	Chris Cariaso	Submission (kimura)	UFC 178	September 27, 2014	2	2:29	Las Vegas, Nevada, United States	Defended the UFC Flyweight Championship.
Win	13–2–1	Ali Bagautinov	Decision (unanimous)	UFC 174	June 14, 2014	5	5:00	Vancouver, British Columbia, Canada	Defended the UFC Flyweight Championship. Bagautinov tested positive for erythropoietin (EPO).
Win	12–2–1	Joseph Benavidez	KO (punches)	UFC on Fox: Johnson vs. Benavidez 2	December 14, 2013	1	2:08	Sacramento, California, United States	Defended the UFC Flyweight Championship. Knockout of the Night.
Win	11–2–1	John Moraga	Submission (armbar)	UFC on Fox: Johnson vs. Moraga	July 27, 2013	5	3:43	Seattle, Washington, United States	Defended the UFC Flyweight Championship. Submission of the Night.
Win	10–2–1	John Dodson	Decision (unanimous)	UFC on Fox: Johnson vs. Dodson	January 26, 2013	5	5:00	Chicago, Illinois, United States	Defended the UFC Flyweight Championship. Fight of the Night.
Win	9–2–1	Joseph Benavidez	Decision (split)	UFC 152	September 22, 2012	5	5:00	Toronto, Ontario, Canada	Won the UFC Flyweight Tournament and the inaugural UFC Flyweight Championship.
Win	8–2–1	Ian McCall	Decision (unanimous)	UFC on FX: Johnson vs. McCall	June 8, 2012	3	5:00	Sunrise, Florida, United States	UFC Flyweight Tournament Semifinal.
Draw	7–2–1	Ian McCall	Draw (majority)	UFC on FX: Alves vs. Kampmann	March 3, 2012	3	5:00	Sydney, Australia	Flyweight debut. UFC Flyweight Tournament Semifinal. Fight of the Night.
Loss	7–2	Dominick Cruz	Decision (unanimous)	UFC Live: Cruz vs. Johnson	October 1, 2011	5	5:00	Washington, D.C., United States	For the UFC Bantamweight Championship.
Win	7–1	Miguel Torres	Decision (unanimous)	UFC 130	May 28, 2011	3	5:00	Las Vegas, Nevada, United States	
Win	6–1	Norifumi Yamamoto	Decision (unanimous)	UFC 126	February 5, 2011	3	5:00	Las Vegas, Nevada, United States	
Win	5–1	Damacio Page	Submission (guillotine choke)	WEC 52	November 11, 2010	3	2:27	Las Vegas, Nevada, United States	
Win	4–1	Nick Pace	Decision (unanimous)	WEC 51	September 30, 2010	3	5:00	Broomfield, Colorado, United States	
Loss	3–1	Brad Pickett	Decision (unanimous)	WEC 48	April 24, 2010	3	5:00	Sacramento, California, United States	
Win	3–0	Jesse Brock	KO (head kick)	AFC 68	February 10, 2010	1	1:06	Anchorage, Alaska, United States	
Win	2–0	Marshall Carlyle	TKO (punches)	AFC 67	January 13, 2010	2	0:51	Anchorage, Alaska, United States	
Win	1–0	Frankie Mendez	Submission (rear-naked choke)	KOTC: Thunderstruck	August 15, 2009	1	4:38	Everett, Washington, United States	

=== Amateur mixed martial arts record ===
Amateur record breakdown		
9 matches	9 wins	0 losses
By knockout	2	0
By submission	5	0
By decision	2	0

Res.	Record	Opponent	Method	Event	Date	Round	Time	Location	Notes
Win	9–0	Louis Contreras	Submission (rear-naked choke)	Genesis: Rise of Kings	June 27, 2009	1	N/A	Shoreline, Washington, United States	
Win	8–0	Lupe Hudgens	Submission (rear-naked choke)	ROTR – Rumble on the Ridge	January 10, 2009	3	1:07	Snoqualmie, Washington, United States	
Win	7–0	Forrest Seabourn	Submission (rear-naked choke)	Genesis: Cold War	December 6, 2008	1	N/A	Bellevue, Washington, United States	
Win	6–0	Jose Garza	Submission (armbar)	AX FC 22: Last Man Standing	August 16, 2008	2	1:56	Lynnwood, Washington, United States	
Win	5–0	Louis Contreras	Submission (keylock)	USA MMA: Northwest Fighting Challenge 6	March 29, 2008	1	N/A	Tumwater, Washington, United States	
Win	4–0	Eric Alvarez	Decision (unanimous)	AX FC 20: March Madness	March 8, 2008	5	5:00	Lynnwood, Washington, United States	
Win	3–0	Jeff Bourgeois	Decision (unanimous)	AX FC 18: The Art of War	September 22, 2007	3	5:00	Lynnwood, Washington, United States	
Win	2–0	Brandon Fields	KO (punch)	AX FC 16: Annihilation	April 28, 2007	1	0:17	Everett, Washington, United States	
Win	1–0	Oren Ulrich	TKO (punches)	GF – Brawl at the Mall 3	July 29, 2006	1	2:29	Auburn, Washington, United States	

== Special rules record ==
Professional record breakdown
1 match	1 win	0 losses
By submission	1	0

Res.	Record	Opponent	Method	Event	Date	Round	Time	Location	Notes
Win	1–0	Rodtang Jitmuangnon	Technical Submission (rear-naked choke)	ONE: X	March 26, 2022	2	2:13	Kallang, Singapore	Three-minute rounds alternating between Muay Thai and MMA rules.

== Pay-per-view bouts ==
No.	Event	Fight	Date	City	Venue	PPV Buys
1.	UFC 174	Johnson vs. Bagautinov	June 14, 2014	Vancouver, British Columbia, Canada	Rogers Arena	115,000
2.	UFC 178	Johnson vs. Cariaso	September 27, 2014	Las Vegas, Nevada, United States	MGM Grand Garden Arena	205,000
3.	UFC 186	Johnson vs. Horiguchi	April 25, 2015	Montreal, Quebec, Canada	Bell Centre	125,000
4.	UFC 191	Johnson vs. Dodson 2	September 5, 2015	Las Vegas, Nevada, United States	MGM Grand Garden Arena	115,000

== See also ==
- List of current ONE fighters
- List of male mixed martial artists
- List of UFC champions

== Notes ==
Achievements
New title	1st UFC Flyweight Champion; September 22, 2012 – August 4, 2018	Succeeded by Henry Cejudo
Preceded by Adriano Moraes	6th ONE Flyweight World Champion; August 27, 2022 – September 6, 2024; Retired	Vacant Title next held by Yuya Wakamatsu
Awards
Preceded by Conor McGregor	Best Fighter ESPY Award; 2017	Succeeded by Terence Crawford
Preceded by Nate Diaz	World MMA Submission of the Year; 2017 vs. Ray Borg at UFC 216	Succeeded by Zabit Magomedsharipov
