= UFC 319 =

Mixed martial arts event in 2025

UFC 319: du Plessis vs. Chimaev
- The poster for UFC 319: du Plessis vs. Chimaev
- Promotion: Ultimate Fighting Championship
- Date: August 16, 2025
- Venue: United Center
- City: Chicago, Illinois, United States
- Attendance: 20,023
- Total gate: $11,014,682

Event chronology
UFC on ESPN: Dolidze vs. Hernandez	UFC 319: du Plessis vs. Chimaev	UFC Fight Night: Walker vs. Zhang

UFC 319: du Plessis vs. Chimaev was a mixed martial arts event produced by the Ultimate Fighting Championship that took place on August 16, 2025, at the United Center in Chicago, Illinois, United States.

== Background ==
The event marked the promotion's eighth visit to Chicago and first since UFC 238 in June 2019.

A UFC Middleweight Championship bout between current champion (also former KSW Welterweight Champion) Dricus du Plessis and undefeated contender Khamzat Chimaev headlined the event. Nassourdine Imavov was expected to serve as backup and potential replacement for this fight, but he announced a month later that it would not be the case anymore as he was angling for a fight against Caio Borralho. In turn, Borralho announced that he would be the new backup for the main event. He and Imavov are still scheduled to headline UFC Fight Night: Imavov vs. Borralho three weeks later.

A welterweight bout between Geoff Neal and Carlos Prates took place at this event. They were originally scheduled to meet at UFC 314 in April, but Neal had to withdraw from the fight due to an injury.

A women's flyweight bout between Karine Silva and JJ Aldrich was scheduled for this event. However, Aldrich withdrew from the fight for undisclosed reasons and was replaced by Dione Barbosa.

The flyweight final of The Ultimate Fighter: Team Cormier vs. Team Sonnen took place at this event. The welterweight final between Rodrigo Sezinando and Daniil Donchenko was scheduled for the event but was moved to UFC Fight Night: Lopes vs. Silva one month later due to an injury suffered from Sezinando's side.

King Green and Carlos Diego Ferreira were expected to meet in a lightweight bout on the preliminary card. However, Green suffered an undisclosed injury during fight week and the pairing was scrapped.

At the weigh-ins, The Return of The Ultimate Fighter: Team Volkanovski vs. Team Ortega middleweight tournament winner Bryan Battle weighed in at 190 pounds, four pounds over the middleweight non-title fight limit. His bout with Nursulton Ruziboev was scheduled to proceed at catchweight, however shortly thereafter, it was announced that the bout had been cancelled and Battle was released from the UFC.

== Results ==
Main card
Weight class				Method	Round	Time	Notes
Middleweight	Khamzat Chimaev	def.	Dricus du Plessis (c)	Decision (unanimous) (50–44, 50–44, 50–44)	5	5:00	(Note: For the UFC Middleweight Championship.)
Featherweight	Lerone Murphy	def.	Aaron Pico	KO (spinning back elbow)	1	3:21
Welterweight	Carlos Prates	def.	Geoff Neal	KO (spinning back elbow)	1	4:59
Middleweight	Michael Page	def.	Jared Cannonier	Decision (unanimous) (29–28, 29–28, 29–28)	3	5:00
Flyweight	Tim Elliott	def.	Kai Asakura	Submission (guillotine choke)	2	4:39
Preliminary card (ESPN / ESPN+ / Disney+)
Middleweight	Baysangur Susurkaev	def.	Eric Nolan	Submission (rear-naked choke)	2	2:01
Middleweight	Michał Oleksiejczuk	def.	Gerald Meerschaert	TKO (punches)	1	3:03
Women's Strawweight	Loopy Godínez	def.	Jéssica Andrade	Decision (unanimous) (29–28, 29–28, 29–28)	3	5:00
Lightweight	Alexander Hernandez	def.	Chase Hooper	TKO (punches)	1	4:58
Early preliminary card (ESPN / ESPN+ / Disney+ / UFC Fight Pass)
Lightweight	Drakkar Klose	def.	Edson Barboza	Decision (unanimous) (29–28, 29–28, 29–28)	3	5:00
Women's Flyweight	Karine Silva	def.	Dione Barbosa	Decision (unanimous) (29–28, 29–28, 29–28)	3	5:00
Flyweight	Joseph Morales	def.	Alibi Idiris	Submission (triangle choke)	2	3:04	(Note: The Ultimate Fighter 33 flyweight tournament final.)

== Bonus awards ==
The following fighters received $50,000 bonuses.

- Fight of the Night: No bonus awarded.
- Performance of the Night: Khamzat Chimaev, Lerone Murphy, Carlos Prates, and Tim Elliott

== See also ==
- 2025 in UFC
- List of current UFC fighters
- List of UFC events
