= Imanol Rodríguez =

Mexican mixed martial artist (born 1999)

- Born: Imanol Rodríguez Pillado; November 15, 1999 (age 26); Ensenada, Baja California, Mexico
- Other names: Hitman
- Height: 5 ft 4 in (1.63 m)
- Weight: 57 kg (126 lb; 9 st 0 lb)
- Division: Flyweight
- Team: Team Blackxicans
- Years active: 2022–present

Mixed martial arts record
- Total: 8
- Wins: 8
- By knockout: 7
- By submission: 1
- Losses: 0

Other information
- Mixed martial arts record from Sherdog

Imanol Rodríguez Pillado (born 15 November 1999) is an Mexican professional mixed martial artist who currently competes in the Flyweight division of the Ultimate Fighting Championship (UFC). As of October 3, 2026, he is #13 in the Meta UFC flyweight rankings.

== Background ==
He began his martial arts training in judo at the Club Deportivo Salgado in Ensenada, where he built his initial foundation as a fighter before transitioning to MMA.

== Mixed martial arts career ==
=== Early career ===
On November 4, 2022, he made his MMA debut competing in the Budo Sento Championship, where he secured a second-round technical knockout victory over Dante Díaz; on June 30, 2023, Rodríguez defeated Uziel Gómez with the same result.

With only two fights under his belt at that point, Imanol began competing abroad; in his lone bout for Combate Global, he secured a first-round submission victory over Emmanuel Berumen. Later, he competed twice in the Fury Fighting Championship (FFC) promotion, earning two first-round knockout wins.

=== The Ultimate Fighter 33 ===
Rodríguez competed in the thirty-third season of The Ultimate Fighter, where he defeated Arshiyan Memon in the quarterfinal via first round submission, but was eliminated in the semifinals by Joseph Morales, who won the fight via split decision.

=== Dana White's Contender Series ===
He was scheduled to compete in the finale of the ninth season of Dana White's Contender Series and faced Roque Conceição Moreira Jr. on October 7, 2025. He won the fight and a UFC contract with a pair of strikes in the first round.

=== Ultimate Fighting Championship ===
Rodríguez made his UFC debut on February 28, 2026, when he faced Kevin Borjas at UFC Fight Night 268. He won the fight by technical knockout in the first round. This fight earned him the Fight of the Night award.

Rodríguez was scheduled to face Matt Schnell on June 6, 2026, at UFC Fight Night 278. However, Rodríguez withdrew nine days before the event and was replaced by Alessandro Costa in a catchweight of 130 pounds.

Rodríguez faced Alden Coria on October 3, 2026, at UFC 332. Following a flurry of punches and a body kick, he secured another technical knockout victory, as well as another Fight of the Night award.

== Personal life ==
Rodríguez is in a relationship with streamer Natalia García (known as NataliaMX), president of Club de Cuervos in the Kings League.

He has expressed his admiration for former UFC Heavyweight Champion Daniel Cormier, his coach on TUF. After his victory at UFC 332, Rodríguez stepped out of the cage to celebrate with him.

== Championships and accomplishments ==
- Ultimate Fighting Championship
  - Performance of the Night (Two times) vs. Kevin Borjas and Alden Coria

== Mixed martial arts record ==
Professional record breakdown
8 matches	8 wins	0 losses
By knockout	7	0
By submission	1	0

Res.	Record	Opponent	Method	Event	Date	Round	Time	Location	Notes
Win	8–0	Alden Coria	TKO (front kick to the body and punches)	UFC 332	3 October 2026	1	3:11	Salt Lake City, Utah, United States	Performance of the Night.
Win	7–0	Kevin Borjas	TKO (punches)	UFC Fight Night: Moreno vs. Kavanagh	28 February 2026	2	4:21	Mexico City, Mexico	Performance of the Night.
Win	6–0	Roque Conceição Moreira Jr.	TKO (punches)	Dana White's Contender Series 85	7 October 2025	1	2:12	Las Vegas, Nevada, United States	
Win	5–0	Alberto Trujillo	TKO (punches)	Fury FC 93	22 September 2024	1	4:27	Houston, Texas, United States	
Win	4–0	Tyrell Hill	TKO (punches)	Fury FC 91	12 July 2024	1	1:50	San Antonio, Texas, United States	
Win	3–0	Emmanuel Berumen	Submission (rear-naked choke)	Combate Global: USA vs. Ecuador	24 February 2024	1	1:30	Miami, Florida, United States	
Win	2–0	Uziel Gómez	TKO (punches)	Budo Sento Championship 15	30 June 2023	2	2:51	Veracruz, Mexico	
Win	1–0	Dante Díaz	TKO (punches)	Budo Sento Championship 11	4 November 2022	2	1:15	Mexico City, Mexico	Flyweight debut.

== Mixed martial arts exhibition record ==
Exhibition record breakdown		
2 matches	1 win	1 loss
By knockout	1	0
By decision	0	1

Res.	Record	Opponent	Method	Event	Date	Round	Time	Location	Notes
Loss	1–1	Joseph Morales	Decision (split)	The Ultimate Fighter: Team Cormier vs. Team Sonnen	March 12, 2025	3	5:00	Las Vegas, Nevada, United States	The Ultimate Fighter 33 Semi-final round.
Win	1–0	Arshiyan Memon	TKO (punches)	The Ultimate Fighter: Team Cormier vs. Team Sonnen	February 19, 2025	1	4:26	Las Vegas, Nevada, United States	The Ultimate Fighter 33 Quarterfinal round.

== See also ==
- List of current UFC fighters
- List of Dana White's Contender Series alumni
- List of male mixed martial artists
- List of Mexican UFC fighters
