= The Ultimate Fighter: Team Grasso vs. Team Shevchenko =

UFC mixed martial arts television series

- Starring: Dana White; Alexa Grasso; Valentina Shevchenko
- Hosted by: Dana White
- No. of contestants: 16
- Location: Las Vegas, Nevada, United States

Release
- Original network: ESPN, ESPN+
- Original release: June 4, 2024

Additional information
- Filming dates: March 2024

Season chronology
- ← Previous; The Ultimate Fighter: Team McGregor vs. Team Chandler Next → The Ultimate Fighter: Team Cormier vs. Team Sonnen

The Ultimate Fighter: Team Grasso vs. Team Shevchenko (also known as The Ultimate Fighter 32 and TUF 32) is a 2024 installment of the Ultimate Fighting Championship (UFC)-produced reality television series The Ultimate Fighter on ESPN+. Current UFC Flyweight Champion Alexa Grasso and former champion Valentina Shevchenko served as head coaches for the season.

This season featured male featherweights and middleweights. The casting call for the season ended on January 19, 2024, with the selections made in late January. The filming of the season began in March 2024. The cast was officially announced on March 4, consisting of fighters from 14 different nationalities.

== Cast ==
=== Coaches ===
Team Grasso:

- Alexa Grasso, Head Coach
- Diego Lopes, assistant coach
- Francisco Grasso, assistant coach
- Alessandro Costa, BJJ coach
- Colin Daynes, wrestling coach
- Jose Martinez, striking coach

Team Shevchenko:

- Valentina Shevchenko, Head Coach
- Pavel Fedotov, assistant coach
- Jason Andrada
- Miguel Carpinacci
- Richie Van Houten
- Martin Gil
- Louai Kiblawi
- Rocky Kiblawi

=== Fighters ===
- Team Grasso
  - Featherweights: Bekhzod Usmonov, Guillermo Torres, Kaan Ofli, and Mairon Santos.
  - Middleweights: Omran Chaaban, Robert Valentin, Thomas Theocharis, and Paddy McCorry.
- Team Shevchenko
  - Featherweights: Edwin Cooper Jr., Nathan Fletcher, Žygimantas Ramaška, and Roedie Roets.
  - Middleweights: Shamidkhan Magomedov, Mark Hulme, Ryan Loder, and Giannis Bachar.

| Coach | 1st Pick | 2nd Pick | 3rd Pick | 4th Pick | 5th Pick | 6th Pick | 7th Pick | 8th Pick |
|---|---|---|---|---|---|---|---|---|
| Grasso | Guillermo Torres (FW) | Robert Valentin (MW) | Kaan Ofli (FW) | Paddy McCorry (MW) | Bekhzod Usmonov (FW) | Omran Chaaban (MW) | Mairon Santos (FW) | Thomas Theocharis (MW) |
| Shevchenko | Roedie Roets (FW) | Shamidkhan Magomedov (MW) | Žygimantas Ramaška (FW) | Mark Hulme (MW) | Nathan Fletcher (FW) | Ryan Loder (MW) | Edwin Cooper Jr. (FW) | Giannis Bachar (MW) |

== Tournament bracket ==
=== Featherweight bracket ===
Quarter-finals
Guillermo Torres | 2
Roedie Roets | UD
Kaan Ofli | UD
Nathan Fletcher | 2
Bekhzod Usmonov | 2
Žygimantas Ramaška | UD
Mairon Santos | SD
Edwin Cooper Jr. | 3

Semi-finals
Roedie Roets | 1
Kaan Ofli | SUB
Guillermo Torres* | 3
Mairon Santos | UD

Final
Kaan Ofli | 2
Mairon Santos | KO

* Žygimantas Ramaška fractured his face, was not medically cleared, and was replaced by Guillermo Torres.

=== Middleweight bracket ===
Quarter-finals
Omran Chaaban | SUB
Shamidkhan Magomedov | 2
Tom Theocharis | 1
Ryan Loder | SUB
Paddy McCorry | SUB
Mark Hulme | 1
Robert Valentin Frey | TKO
Giannis Bachar | 1

Semi-finals
Omran Chaaban | 3
Ryan Loder | UD
Paddy McCorry | 1
Robert Valentin Frey | SUB

Final
Ryan Loder | TKO
Robert Valentin Frey | 2

| | Team Grasso |
| | Team Shevchenko |
| UD | Unanimous Decision |
| MD | Majority Decision |
| SD | Split Decision |
| SUB | Submission |
| (T)KO | (Technical) Knock Out |

== See also ==
- The Ultimate Fighter
- List of UFC events
- 2024 in UFC
- List of current UFC fighters
