= Joseph Morales (fighter) =

American mixed martial arts fighter

- Born: August 22, 1994 (age 32); Clovis, California, U.S.
- Other names: Bopo
- Height: 5 ft 6 in (1.68 m)
- Weight: 125 lb (57 kg; 8 st 13 lb)
- Division: Flyweight
- Reach: 68.0 in (173 cm)
- Fighting out of: Sacramento, California, U.S.
- Team: Team Alpha Male
- Years active: 2014–present

Mixed martial arts record
- Total: 17
- Wins: 14
- By knockout: 2
- By submission: 8
- By decision: 4
- Losses: 3
- By knockout: 1
- By decision: 2

Other information
- Mixed martial arts record from Sherdog

Joseph Morales (born August 22, 1994) is an American mixed martial artist who currently competes in the Flyweight division of the Ultimate Fighting Championship (UFC).

== Mixed martial arts career ==
=== Early career ===
In his MMA debut at WSOF 16, Joseph defeated Christian Espinosa via unanimous decision. Then he defeated Roque Reyes via TKO in the first round. At WFC 14, Joseph submitted Benji Gomez in the second round via rear naked choke. He also tapped out Gerald Bailey in round one via guillotine choke at GKO 4. Joseph submitted his next two opponents in Sammy Saunders and Gerald Bailey respectively. At GKO 8, he defeated Josh Paiva via unanimous decision, earning him the GKO Flyweight Championship. At CFFC 64 Joseph defeated Sean Santella via TKO in the second round and earned his ticket to the UFC in the process.

=== Ultimate Fighting Championship ===
Morales made his promotional debut on August 5, 2017, at UFC Fight Night 114, facing Roberto Sanchez. He won the fight via a rear-naked choke in round one and earned a Performance of the Night bonus.

On February 3, 2018, Morales faced Deiveson Figueiredo at UFC Fight Night 125. He lost the fight via technical knockout in round two.

Morales faced Eric Shelton on November 10, 2018, at UFC Fight Night 139. He lost the fight via split decision.

After losing his last two fights, Morales got released from the UFC in May 2019.

=== Post-UFC career ===
Morales made his return to mixed martial arts, after a three year absence from the sport, to face Kevin Wirth at Cage Warriors 126 on August 1, 2021. Morales won the fight by unanimous decision.

Morales faced Sidemar Honorio on March 4, 2022, at Cage Warriors 133. He won the bout via split decision.

Morales won the A1C Flyweight Championship on February 3, 2023, submitting Anthony Do in the third round via triangle choke.

=== The Ultimate Fighter 33 ===
Morales competed in the thirty-third season of The Ultimate Fighter, where he defeated Eduardo Henrique in the quarterfinal via first round submission, and then defeated Imanol Rodríguez in the semi final via split decision.

Morales faced Alibi Idiris in the tournament final on August 16, 2025, at UFC 319. He won the fight via a triangle choke in round two to become The Ultimate Fighter season 33 winner.

=== Return to UFC ===
Morales faced Matt Schnell on November 8, 2025, at UFC Fight Night 264. He won the fight via guillotine choke submission in the first round.

Morales faced former two-time UFC Flyweight Champion Brandon Moreno on September 12, 2026 at UFC Fight Night 288. He lost the fight by split decision. 6 out of 9 media outlets scored the bout for Morales.

== Professional grappling career ==
Morales was booked to compete in the Combat Jiu-Jitsu bantamweight world championship on July 30, 2023.

== Championships and achievements ==
=== Mixed martial arts ===
- Ultimate Fighting Championship
  - Performance of the Night (One time) vs. Roberto Sanchez
  - The Ultimate Fighter 33 Flyweight Tournament Winner
- Urijah Faber's A1 Combat
  - A1 Combat Flyweight Championship (One time)
- Global Knockout
  - GKO Flyweight Championship (One time)

== Mixed martial arts record ==
Professional record breakdown
17 matches	14 wins	3 losses
By knockout	2	1
By submission	8	0
By decision	4	2

Res.	Record	Opponent	Method	Event	Date	Round	Time	Location	Notes
Loss	14–3	Brandon Moreno	Decision (split)	UFC Fight Night: Silva vs. Delgado	September 12, 2026	3	5:00	Glendale, Arizona, United States	
Win	14–2	Matt Schnell	Submission (guillotine choke)	UFC Fight Night: Bonfim vs. Brown	November 8, 2025	1	2:54	Las Vegas, Nevada, United States	
Win	13–2	Alibi Idiris	Submission (triangle choke)	UFC 319	August 16, 2025	2	3:04	Chicago, Illinois, United States	Won The Ultimate Fighter 33 Flyweight Tournament.
Win	12–2	Anthony Do	Submission (triangle choke)	Urijah Faber's A1 Combat 8	February 3, 2023	3	4:46	Lemoore, California, United States	Won the inaugural A1 Combat Flyweight Championship.
Win	11–2	Sidemar Honorio	Decision (split)	Cage Warriors 133	March 4, 2022	3	5:00	San Diego, California, United States	
Win	10–2	Kevin Wirth	Decision (unanimous)	Cage Warriors 126	August 1, 2021	3	5:00	San Diego, California, United States	
Loss	9–2	Eric Shelton	Decision (split)	UFC Fight Night: The Korean Zombie vs. Rodríguez	November 10, 2018	3	5:00	Denver, Colorado, United States	
Loss	9–1	Deiveson Figueiredo	TKO (punches)	UFC Fight Night: Machida vs. Anders	February 3, 2018	2	4:34	Belém, Brazil	
Win	9–0	Roberto Sanchez	Submission (rear-naked choke)	UFC Fight Night: Pettis vs. Moreno	August 5, 2017	1	3:56	Mexico City, Mexico	Performance of the Night.
Win	8–0	Sean Santella	TKO (punches)	Cage Fury FC 64	25 March 2017	2	3:24	San Diego, California, United States	
Win	7–0	Josh Paiva	Decision (unanimous)	Global Knockout 8	November 19, 2016	5	5:00	Jackson, California, United States	Won the vacant GKO Flyweight Championship.
Win	6–0	Gerald Bailey	Submission (rear-naked choke)	Global Knockout 7	August 27, 2016	1	3:48	Jackson, California, United States	
Win	5–0	Sammy Saunders	Submission (triangle choke)	Global Knockout 6	March 26, 2016	1	3:50	Jackson, California, United States	
Win	4–0	Gerald Bailey	Submission (rear-naked choke)	Global Knockout 4	August 29, 2015	1	2:30	Jackson, California, United States	Bantamweight bout.
Win	3–0	Benji Gomez	Submission (rear-naked choke)	West Coast FC 14	May 30, 2015	2	2:21	Sacramento, California, United States	Return to Flyweight.
Win	2–0	Roque Reyes	TKO (punches)	West Coast FC 13	February 28, 2015	1	1:43	Sacramento, California, United States	Bantamweight debut.
Win	1–0	Christian Espinosa	Decision (unanimous)	WSOF 16	December 13, 2014	3	5:00	Sacramento, California, United States	Flyweight debut.

== Mixed martial arts exhibition record ==
Exhibition record breakdown		
2 matches	2 wins	0 losses
By submission	1	0
By decision	1	0

Res.	Record	Opponent	Method	Event	Date	Round	Time	Location	Notes
Win	2–0	Imanol Rodríguez	Decision (split)	The Ultimate Fighter: Team Cormier vs. Team Sonnen	March 12, 2025	3	5:00	Las Vegas, Nevada, United States	The Ultimate Fighter 33 Semi-final round.
Win	1–0	Eduardo Henrique	Submission (rear-naked choke)	The Ultimate Fighter: Team Cormier vs. Team Sonnen	February 19, 2025	1	2:26	Las Vegas, Nevada, United States	The Ultimate Fighter 33 Quarterfinal round.

== See also ==
- List of male mixed martial artists
