= Matt Schnell =

American mixed martial artist (born 1990)

- Born: Matthew Christopher Schnell; January 15, 1990 (age 36); Amory, Mississippi, U.S.
- Nickname: Danger
- Height: 5 ft 8 in (1.73 m)
- Weight: 125 lb (57 kg; 8 st 13 lb)
- Division: Flyweight; Bantamweight
- Reach: 70 in (178 cm)
- Fighting out of: Shreveport, Louisiana, U.S.
- Team: American Top Team (2014–2017); Combat Sports Academy (2017–2024); American Kickboxing Academy (2017–2024)
- Rank: Black belt in Karate; Purple belt in Brazilian Jiu-Jitsu
- Years active: 2009–2026

Mixed martial arts record
- Total: 29
- Wins: 17
- By knockout: 2
- By submission: 9
- By decision: 5
- By disqualification: 1
- Losses: 11
- By knockout: 6
- By submission: 4
- By decision: 1
- No contests: 1

Other information
- Website: mattschnell.com
- Mixed martial arts record from Sherdog

Matthew Christopher Schnell (born January 15, 1990) is an American former professional mixed martial artist who competed in the Flyweight division of the Ultimate Fighting Championship (UFC). Schnell formerly competed for Legacy Fighting Alliance, where he is a former Legacy Fighting Alliance Flyweight Champion.

== Mixed martial arts career ==
=== Caged ===
In 2012, Schnell was one of the young MMA fighters featured in Caged - an MTV reality television series. The show focused on four prospective MMA fighters in small-town Louisiana. Schnell was one of the two fighters on the show, alongside Tony Kelley, to later fight professionally.

=== Legacy Fighting Championship ===
Schnell joined Legacy Fighting Championship in 2012 and went 9–2 in various promotions before joining the cast of The Ultimate Fighter, season 24.

=== The Ultimate Fighter: Tournament of Champions ===
On May 11, 2016, the UFC announced that the 16 contestants for The Ultimate Fighter: Tournament of Champions would be flyweight champion fighters from various organizations around the world, with the winner being expected to have a chance to fight for the flyweight title against Demetrious Johnson. Schnell was announced as part of the cast in July and selected for Team Cejudo.

In the first round on the show, Schnell seeded at #6 faced #11 Matt Rizzo and defeated him in the second round via a triangle choke submission. Schnell advanced to the quarterfinals and faced #3 seed Tim Elliott. He lost the fight via first-round submission due to a bulldog choke.

=== Ultimate Fighting Championship ===
After his stint on The Ultimate Fighter, Schnell was chosen as one of the cast mates to get a contract. Schnell fought Rob Font in the bantamweight division at The Ultimate Fighter: Tournament of Champions Finale. He lost the fight via TKO in the first round.

Schnell returned to the flyweight division and faced Hector Sandoval on April 22, 2017, at UFC Fight Night 108. He lost the fight via knockout in the first round.

Schnell next fought on October 7, 2017, at UFC 216 against Marco Beltrán. He won the fight by unanimous decision.

Schnell faced Naoki Inoue on June 23, 2018, at UFC Fight Night 132. He won the fight via split decision.

Schnell faced Louis Smolka in a bantamweight bout on March 9, 2019, at UFC Fight Night 146. He won the fight via a triangle choke submission in the first round.

As the first fight of his new, four-fight contract, Schnell faced Jordan Espinosa on August 3, 2019, at UFC on ESPN 5. He won the fight via a triangle choke submission in the first round. The win also earned Schnell his first Performance of the Night bonus award.

Schnell faced Alexandre Pantoja on December 21, 2019, at UFC Fight Night 165. He lost the fight via first-round knockout.

Schnell was expected to face Tyson Nam on September 12, 2020, at UFC Fight Night 183. However, Schnell was removed from the fight on the day of the event's weigh-in for health issues related to his weight cut. As a result, the fight was cancelled. The bout with Nam was first rescheduled to UFC Fight Night 183, on December 19, 2020, and then to UFC on ESPN 20, on January 20, 2021. He won the bout by split decision.

As the first fight of his new multi-fight contract, Schnell was scheduled to meet Alex Perez May 15, 2021, at UFC 262. However, Perez pulled out of the fight for undisclosed reasons and was replaced by Rogério Bontorin. At the weigh ins, Bontorin weighed in at 137 pounds, 1 pound over the bantamweight non-title fight limit. The bout proceeded at catchweight and Bontorin was fined 20% of his individual purse, which went to Schnell. Schnell lost the bout via unanimous decision.

The bout with Perez was rescheduled and was expected to take place on August 28, 2021, at UFC on ESPN 30. However, for undisclosed reason the bout was moved to UFC Fight Night 191. However, the bout was yet again postponed for unknown reasons to UFC 269. At the weigh-ins Alex Perez weighed in at 126.25 pounds, a quarter-pound over the flyweight non-title fight limit. Shortly after the weigh-ins, officials had announced that the bout had been cancelled due Schnell was forced to withdraw from the event due to a medical issue. The pair was rescheduled to UFC 271 on February 12, 2022. At weigh-ins, Perez came in at 128 pounds and did not attempt to try again, resulting in Matt Schnell refusing to take the catchweight bout and the bout being scrapped.

Schnell faced Brandon Royval on May 7, 2022, at UFC 274. He lost the back-and-forth fight via a guillotine choke submission in the first round. The fight also won both men the Fight of the Night bonus award.

Schnell faced Su Mudaerji on July 16, 2022, at UFC on ABC 3. After getting hit and wobbled by multiple flush punches and elbow strikes, Schnell gained top position and came back to win the bout via technical submission with a triangle choke in the second round. This win earned both fighters the Fight of the Night bonus award.

Schnell faced Matheus Nicolau on December 3, 2022, at UFC on ESPN 42. He lost the bout via knockout in the second round.

Schnell was scheduled to face David Dvořák on June 10, 2023, at UFC 289. However, Schnell pulled out due to injury and was replaced by Stephen Erceg.

Schnell was scheduled to face Steve Erceg on November 11, 2023, at UFC 295. However, Schnell withdrew from the bout for unknown reasons and was replaced by Alessandro Costa. He was rescheduled to face Erceg on March 2, 2024, at UFC Fight Night 238. Schnell suffered his second consecutive knockout and lost the bout in the second round from a left-hook.

Schnell was scheduled to face Alessandro Costa on September 7, 2024, at UFC Fight Night 242. However, in under one week before the event, Costa withdrew from the bout due to a shoulder injury and was replaced by Cody Durden in a bantamweight bout. Schnell lost the fight via a ninja choke submission in the second round. Following the bout, Schnell left his gloves in the center of the octagon signaling his retirement from MMA.

After a brief hiatus, Schnell faced Jimmy Flick on April 26, 2025, at UFC on ESPN 66. He won the fight by unanimous decision.

Schnell faced Joseph Morales on November 8, 2025, at UFC Fight Night 264. He lost the fight via guillotine choke submission in the first round.

Schnell was scheduled to face Imanol Rodríguez on June 6, 2026 at UFC Fight Night 278. However, Rodríguez withdrew nine days before the event and was replaced by Alessandro Costa in a catchweight of 130 pounds. Schnell lost the fight by technical knockout in the first round.

On June 7, 2026 following his loss, Schnell announced his retirement once again from mixed martial arts competition.

== Personal life ==
Schnell and his wife Morgan have a daughter (born 2020).

== Championships and accomplishments ==
- Ultimate Fighting Championship
  - Performance of the Night (One time) vs. Jordan Espinosa
  - Fight of the Night (Two times) vs. Brandon Royval and Su Mudaerji
  - Second most triangle-choke submissions in UFC history (3) (behind Paul Craig)
  - UFC Honors Awards
    - 2022: President's Choice Fight of the Year Nominee vs. Su Mudaerji & Fan's Choice Comeback of the Year Nominee vs. Su Mudaerji
  - UFC.com Awards
    - 2022: Ranked #5 Fight of the Year vs. Su Mudaerji & Ranked #7 Submission of the Year vs. Su Mudaerji
- Legacy Fighting Alliance
  - Legacy FC Flyweight champion (one time; former)
- MMA Fighting
  - 2022 Second Team MMA All-Star

== Mixed martial arts record ==
Professional record breakdown
29 matches	17 wins	11 losses
By knockout	2	6
By submission	9	4
By decision	5	1
By disqualification	1	0
No contests	1	

Res.	Record	Opponent	Method	Event	Date	Round	Time	Location	Notes
Loss	17–11 (1)	Alessandro Costa	TKO (punches)	UFC Fight Night: Muhammad vs. Bonfim	June 6, 2026	1	2:32	Las Vegas, Nevada, United States	Catchweight (130 lb) bout.
Loss	17–10 (1)	Joseph Morales	Submission (guillotine choke)	UFC Fight Night: Bonfim vs. Brown	November 8, 2025	1	2:54	Las Vegas, Nevada, United States	
Win	17–9 (1)	Jimmy Flick	Decision (unanimous)	UFC on ESPN: Machado Garry vs. Prates	April 26, 2025	3	5:00	Kansas City, Missouri, United States	
Loss	16–9 (1)	Cody Durden	Submission (ninja choke)	UFC Fight Night: Burns vs. Brady	September 7, 2024	2	0:29	Las Vegas, Nevada, United States	Bantamweight bout.
Loss	16–8 (1)	Steve Erceg	KO (punch)	UFC Fight Night: Rozenstruik vs. Gaziev	March 2, 2024	2	0:26	Las Vegas, Nevada, United States	
Loss	16–7 (1)	Matheus Nicolau	KO (punches)	UFC on ESPN: Thompson vs. Holland	December 3, 2022	2	1:44	Orlando, Florida, United States	
Win	16–6 (1)	Su Mudaerji	Technical Submission (triangle choke)	UFC on ABC: Ortega vs. Rodríguez	July 16, 2022	2	4:24	Elmont, New York, United States	Fight of the Night.
Loss	15–6 (1)	Brandon Royval	Submission (guillotine choke)	UFC 274	May 7, 2022	1	2:14	Phoenix, Arizona, United States	Fight of the Night.
NC	15–5 (1)	Rogério Bontorin	NC (overturned)	UFC 262	May 15, 2021	3	5:00	Houston, Texas, United States	Bantamweight bout; Bontorin missed weight (137 lb). Originally a unanimous decision win for Bontorin; overturned after he tested positive for hydrochlorothiazide.
Win	15–5	Tyson Nam	Decision (split)	UFC on ESPN: Chiesa vs. Magny	January 20, 2021	3	5:00	Abu Dhabi, United Arab Emirates	
Loss	14–5	Alexandre Pantoja	KO (punches)	UFC Fight Night: Edgar vs. The Korean Zombie	December 21, 2019	1	4:17	Busan, South Korea	
Win	14–4	Jordan Espinosa	Submission (triangle choke)	UFC on ESPN: Covington vs. Lawler	August 3, 2019	1	1:23	Newark, New Jersey, United States	Performance of the Night.
Win	13–4	Louis Smolka	Submission (triangle choke)	UFC Fight Night: Lewis vs. dos Santos	March 9, 2019	1	3:18	Wichita, Kansas, United States	Bantamweight bout.
Win	12–4	Naoki Inoue	Decision (split)	UFC Fight Night: Cowboy vs. Edwards	June 23, 2018	3	5:00	Kallang, Singapore	
Win	11–4	Marco Beltrán	Decision (unanimous)	UFC 216	October 7, 2017	3	5:00	Las Vegas, Nevada, United States	
Loss	10–4	Hector Sandoval	KO (punches)	UFC Fight Night: Swanson vs. Lobov	April 22, 2017	1	4:24	Nashville, Tennessee, United States	Return to Flyweight.
Loss	10–3	Rob Font	KO (knee and punches)	The Ultimate Fighter: Tournament of Champions Finale	December 3, 2016	1	3:47	Las Vegas, Nevada, United States	Bantamweight debut.
Win	10–2	Klayton Mai	Submission (armbar)	Legacy FC 52	March 25, 2016	1	2:14	Lake Charles, Louisiana, United States	Won the interim Legacy FC Flyweight Championship.
Win	9–2	Jonathan Martinez	DQ (illegal knee)	Legacy FC 49	December 4, 2015	2	2:21	Bossier City, Louisiana, United States	
Win	8–2	Vanderlei Carvalho Leite	KO (punches)	Legacy FC 42	June 26, 2015	1	0:19	Lake Charles, Louisiana, United States	
Win	7–2	Albert Tapia	Submission (armbar)	Legacy FC: Legacy Kickboxing 2	May 29, 2015	2	3:19	Shreveport, Louisiana, United States	
Win	6–2	Chris Myers	Submission (guillotine choke)	Caged Warrior Championship 6	February 21, 2015	1	0:17	Houma, Louisiana, United States	
Win	5–2	Thomas Coleman	Submission (inverted triangle choke)	Summit FC 10	November 22, 2014	1	N/A	Tupelo, Mississippi, United States	
Win	4–2	Latral Perdue	KO (punch)	Global Fighting Alliance 27	September 19, 2014	1	N/A	Bossier City, Louisiana, United States	
Loss	3–2	Klayton Mai	Submission (guillotine choke)	Legacy FC 32	June 20, 2014	2	1:24	Bossier City, Louisiana, United States	
Win	3–1	Roger Reyes	Submission (guillotine choke)	World FC 17	January 25, 2014	1	1:26	Baton Rouge, Louisiana, United States	
Loss	2–1	Elias Garcia	Decision (majority)	Legacy FC 20	May 31, 2013	3	5:00	Corpus Christi, Texas, United States	
Win	2–0	Marcus Dupar	Submission (armbar)	Legacy FC 15	November 16, 2012	1	1:06	Houston, Texas, United States,	
Win	1–0	Ryan Hollis	Decision (split)	Legacy FC 14	September 14, 2012	3	5:00	Houston, Texas, United States,	Flyweight debut.

=== Mixed martial arts exhibition record ===
Exhibition record breakdown		
2 matches	1 win	1 loss
By submission	1	1

Res.	Record	Opponent	Method	Event	Date	Round	Time	Location	Notes
Loss	1–1	Tim Elliott	Submission (guillotine choke)	The Ultimate Fighter: Tournament of Champions	November 16, 2016	1	3:26	Las Vegas, Nevada, United States	TUF 24 Quarter-final round
Win	1–0	Matt Rizzo	Submission (triangle choke)	The Ultimate Fighter: Tournament of Champions	October 5, 2016	2	2:04	Las Vegas, Nevada, United States	TUF 24 Round of 16

*Date given is the air date of the episode. The actual dates of the fight are not released by the UFC

== See also ==
- List of male mixed martial artists
