= The Ultimate Fighter: Team Cormier vs. Team Sonnen =

UFC mixed martial arts television series

- Starring: Dana White
- Hosted by: Dana White
- Coaches: Daniel Cormier; Chael Sonnen
- Location: Las Vegas, Nevada, United States
- No. of episodes: 12

Release
- Original network: ESPN2, ESPN Deportes
- Original release: May 27, 2025

Additional information
- Filming dates: November 2024

Season chronology
- ← Previous; The Ultimate Fighter: Team Grasso vs. Team Shevchenko Next → The Ultimate Fighter: Team Cormier vs. Team Bisping

The Ultimate Fighter: Team Cormier vs. Team Sonnen (also known as The Ultimate Fighter 33 and TUF 33) is a 2025 installment of the Ultimate Fighting Championship (UFC)-produced reality television series The Ultimate Fighter on ESPN+ and UFC Fight Pass. This season marked the 20th anniversary of The Ultimate Fighter. This season will feature male flyweights and welterweights. The casting call for the season started from November 4, 2024, to December 13, 2024, and the show aired every Tuesday from May 27, 2025.

Former UFC Heavyweight and UFC Light Heavyweight Champion Daniel Cormier and former UFC Light Heavyweight and UFC Middleweight title challenger Chael Sonnen served as coaches for the season.

== Cast ==
=== Coaches ===
Team Cormier:

- Daniel Cormier, Head Coach
- Tiago Beowulf
- Rosendo Sanchez
- Bob Cook
- John Wood
- Michael Chiesa
- Julius Creed

Team Sonnen:

- Chael Sonnen, Head Coach
- Clayton Hires
- Stephen Smith
- Jamie Huey
- Colby Covington
- Mason Fowler

=== Fighters ===
- Team Cormier
  - Flyweights: Alibi Idiris, Eduardo Henrique, Imanol Rodríguez, and Tumelo Manyamala.
  - Welterweights: Alex Sanchez, Daniil Donchenko, Jeff Creighton, and Rodrigo Sezinando.
- Team Sonnen
  - Flyweights: Roybert Echerverria, Furkatbek Yokubov, Arshiyan Memon, and Joseph Morales.
  - Welterweights: Matt Dixon, Richard Martins, Diego Bianchini, and Andreeas Binder.

Coach	1st Pick	2nd Pick	3rd Pick	4th Pick	5th Pick	6th Pick	7th Pick	8th Pick
Cormier	Eduardo Henrique (FLW)	Rodrigo Sezinando (WW)	Alibi Idiris (FLW)	Daniil Donchenko (WW)	Imanol Rodríguez (FLW)	Jeff Creighton (WW)	Tumelo Manyamala (FLW)	Alex Sanchez (WW)
Sonnen	Joseph Morales (FLW)	Diego Bianchini (WW)	Furkatbek Yokubov (FLW)	Matt Dixon (WW)	Roybert Echerverria (FLW)	Richard Martins (WW)	Arshiyan Memon (FLW)	Andreeas Binder (WW)

== Tournament bracket ==
=== Welterweight bracket ===
Quarter-finals
Jefferson Creighton	UD
Andreeas Binder	2
Rodrigo Sezinando	UD
Diego Bianchini	2
Daniil Donchenko	UD
Richard Martins	2
Alejandro Sanchez	1
Matt Dixon	TKO

Semi-finals
Jefferson Creighton	3
Rodrigo Sezinando	SD
Daniil Donchenko	TKO
Matt Dixon	1

Final
Daniil Donchenko	TKO
Rodrigo Sezinando	1

=== Flyweight bracket ===
Quarter-finals
Eduardo Henrique	1
Joseph Morales	SUB
Imanol Rodríguez	TKO
Arshiyan Memon	1
Alibi Idiris	UD
Furkatbek Yokubov	2
Tumelo Manyamala	2
Roybert Echeverria	SUB

Semi-finals
Joseph Morales	SD
Imanol Rodríguez	3
Alibi Idiris	TKO
Roybert Echeverria	1

Final
Joseph Morales	SUB
Alibi Idiris	2

	Team Cormier
	Team Sonnen
UD	Unanimous Decision
MD	Majority Decision
SD	Split Decision
SUB	Submission
(T)KO	(Technical) Knock Out

== See also ==
- The Ultimate Fighter
- List of UFC events
- 2025 in UFC
- List of current UFC fighters
