= List of UFC champions =

American MMA promotion company victors

This is a list of all UFC champions.

== Historical notes ==
At the time of the UFC's inception in 1993, Mixed martial arts was not sanctioned in the United States, and did not include weight classes. Instead of the traditional championship model, the UFC held tournaments with the winner receiving a permanent appellation. In response to criticism from Senator John McCain that saw the loss of its television deal and the banning of the sport in thirty-six states, the UFC increased its cooperation with state athletic commissions and introduced weight classes in 1997, starting with UFC 12, and began introducing weight-specific titles.

The original codification for weight classes introduced only two divisions: heavyweight, which grouped together all competitors above 200 pounds (91 kg), and lightweight, which encompassed all competitors 199 pounds (90 kg) and under. At UFC 14 the lightweight division would be renamed to middleweight, though it would still encompass all fighters 199 pounds (90 kg) and under. The lightweight moniker would later return at UFC 16 with a new division consisting of those competitors 170 pounds (77 kg) and under. Two years later a fourth weight class, the bantamweight division, arrived at UFC 26 and included all fighters 155 pounds (70 kg) and under.

In 2000, the New Jersey State Athletic Control Board completely took over MMA regulation in its home state and developed new rules and weight classes that eventually became the de facto rule set for all mixed martial arts. The UFC realigned their weight classes to comply with these new regulations in 2001, beginning with UFC 31. At the time, this brought the total number of active divisions in the UFC to five: lightweight, welterweight, middleweight, light heavyweight, and heavyweight.

It would be nearly ten years before the UFC would expand their divisional offerings to include any of the lower weight classes. The first additions came in late 2010 when the UFC merged with their sister organization World Extreme Cagefighting (WEC). Due to the WEC's focus on lighter weight fighters, this merger necessitated the addition of both the featherweight and bantamweight divisions to the UFC, starting with The Ultimate Fighter season 12 finale. In early 2012 the UFC decided they would delve even further into the lower weight classes when they announced the introduction of the flyweight division to their ranks, beginning with UFC on FX: Alves vs. Kampmann.

In November 2012, as a result of the forthcoming dissolution of their sister organization Strikeforce, the UFC announced they would be adding female fighters to their roster for the first time in the promotion's history. Initially, only the women's bantamweight division was brought over, with the division's premiere bout taking place at UFC 157. A little over a year later, the UFC announced they would be expanding their weight classes for female fighters with the addition of a women's strawweight division, the first bout took place at UFC Fight Night: Cowboy vs. Miller. In late 2016, a featherweight division was introduced for the women with the first bout to be for the inaugural championship at UFC 208 on February 11, 2017. In that same year the UFC announced the Women's Flyweight division would officially be added, with the winner of the 26th season of The Ultimate Fighter to be named the inaugural champion.

== Current champions ==
=== Men ===
Division	Champion	Since	Defenses
Heavyweight	(France) Ciryl Gane	Sep 14, 2026	1
Light Heavyweight	(New Zealand) Carlos Ulberg	Apr 11, 2026	0
Middleweight	(United States) Sean Strickland	May 9, 2026	0
Welterweight	(Russia) Islam Makhachev	Nov 15, 2025	1
Lightweight	(United States) Justin Gaethje	Jun 14, 2026	0
Featherweight	(Australia) Alexander Volkanovski	Apr 12, 2025	2
Bantamweight	(Russia) Petr Yan	Dec 6, 2025	1
Flyweight	(Myanmar) Joshua Van	Dec 6, 2025	2

=== Women ===
Division	Champion	Since	Defenses
Bantamweight	(United States) Kayla Harrison	Jun 7, 2025	1
Flyweight	(Brazil) Natália Silva	Oct 3, 2026	0
Strawweight	(Brazil) Mackenzie Dern	Oct 25, 2025	1

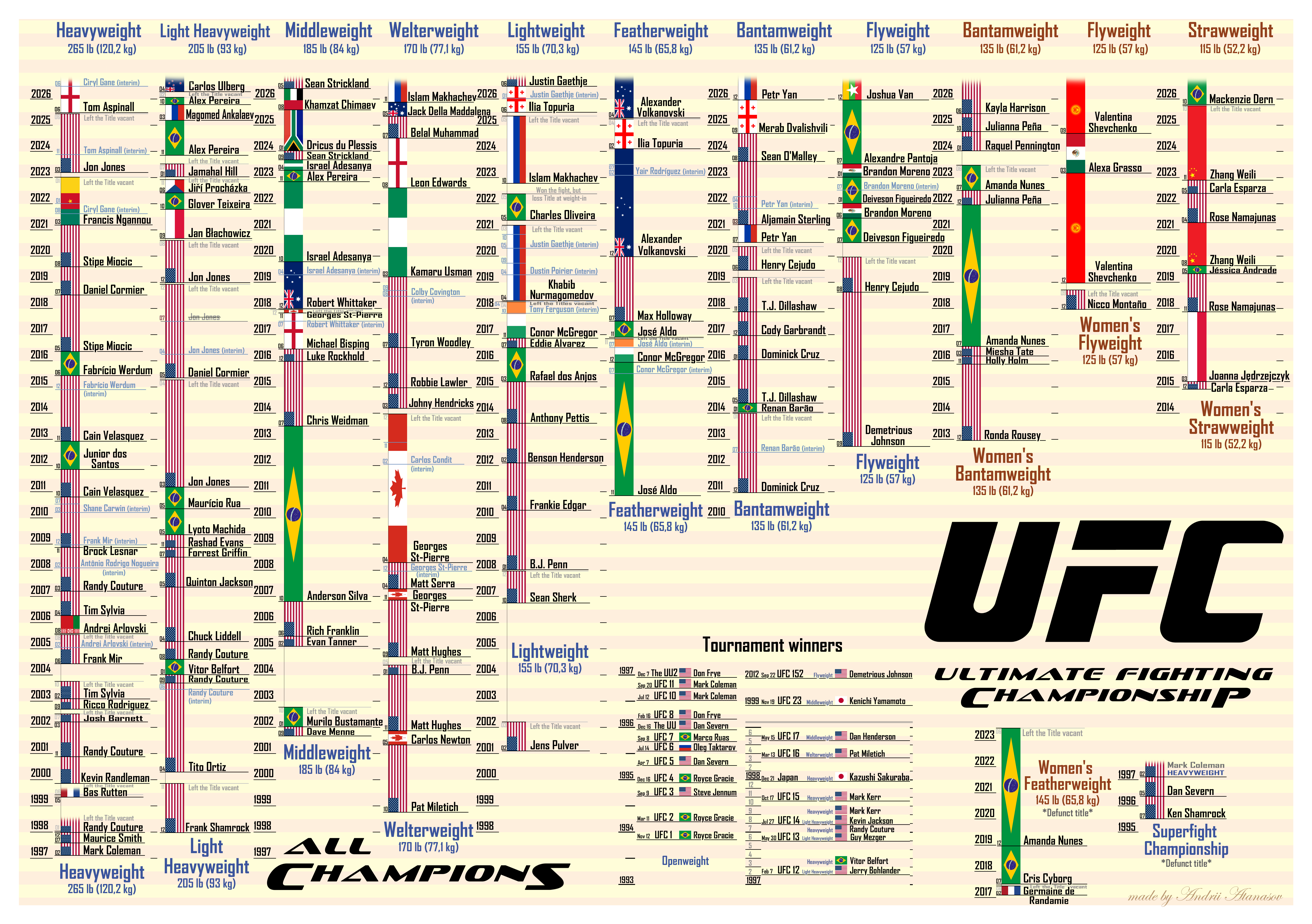

== Men's championship history ==
=== Heavyweight Championship ===
206 to 265 lb (93 to 120 kg)
The UFC Superfight Championship was unified with the UFC 11 Tournament Championship to determine the inaugural UFC Heavyweight Champion on February 7, 1997, when Mark Coleman defeated Dan Severn at UFC 12.

No.	Name	Event	Date	Reign (total)	Defenses
1	(United States) Mark Coleman def. Dan Severn	UFC 12; Dothan, AL, US	Feb 7, 1997	170 days	
2	(United States) Maurice Smith	UFC 14; Birmingham, AL, US	Jul 27, 1997	147 days	1. def. Tank Abbott at UFC 15 on Oct 17, 1997
3	(United States) Randy Couture	UFC Japan; Yokohama, Japan	Dec 21, 1997	? days	
Couture was stripped of the title in January 1998, when he left the UFC due to a contract dispute.
4	(Netherlands) Bas Rutten def. Kevin Randleman	UFC 20; Birmingham, AL, US	May 7, 1999	34 days	
Rutten vacated the title in June 1999 in order to drop down to Light Heavyweight. He retired soon after due to training injuries.
5	(United States) Kevin Randleman def. Pete Williams	UFC 23; Tokyo, Japan	Nov 19, 1999	364 days	1. def. Pedro Rizzo at UFC 26 on Jun 9, 2000
6	(United States) Randy Couture (2)	UFC 28; Atlantic City, NJ, US	Nov 17, 2000	490 days (490+ days)	1. def. Pedro Rizzo at UFC 31 on May 4, 2001; 2. def. Pedro Rizzo at UFC 34 on Nov 2, 2001
7	(United States) Josh Barnett	UFC 36; Las Vegas, NV, US	Mar 22, 2002	126 days	
Barnett was stripped of the title on July 26, 2002, after testing positive for anabolic steroids in a post-fight drug test.
8	(United States) Ricco Rodriguez def. Randy Couture	UFC 39; Uncasville, CT, US	Sep 27, 2002	154 days	
9	(United States) Tim Sylvia	UFC 41; Atlantic City, NJ, US	Feb 28, 2003	229 days	1. def. Gan McGee at UFC 44 on Sep 26, 2003
Sylvia was stripped of the title on October 15, 2003, after testing positive for anabolic steroids in a post-fight drug test.
10	(United States) Frank Mir def. Tim Sylvia	UFC 48; Las Vegas, NV, US	Jun 19, 2004	419 days	
—	(Belarus) Andrei Arlovski def. Tim Sylvia for interim title	UFC 51; Las Vegas, NV, US	Feb 5, 2005	—	1. def. Justin Eilers at UFC 53 on Jun 4, 2005
Mir was stripped of the title on August 12, 2005, for inactivity resulting from injuries he sustained in a road accident.
11	(Belarus) Andrei Arlovski promoted to undisputed champion	—	Aug 12, 2005	246 days	1. def. Paul Buentello at UFC 55 on Oct 7, 2005
12	(United States) Tim Sylvia (2)	UFC 59; Anaheim, CA, US	Apr 15, 2006	322 days (551 days)	1. def. Andrei Arlovski at UFC 61 on Jul 8, 2006; 2. def. Jeff Monson at UFC 65 on Nov 18, 2006
13	(United States) Randy Couture (3)	UFC 68; Columbus, OH, US	Mar 3, 2007	623 days (1,113+ days)	1. def. Gabriel Gonzaga at UFC 74 on Aug 25, 2007
—	(Brazil) Antônio Rodrigo Nogueira def. Tim Sylvia for interim title	UFC 81; Las Vegas, NV, US	Feb 2, 2008	—	
14	(United States) Brock Lesnar	UFC 91; Las Vegas, NV, US	Nov 15, 2008	707 days	1. def. interim champion Frank Mir at UFC 100 on Jul 11, 2009; 2. def. interim champion Shane Carwin at UFC 116 on Jul 3, 2010
—	(United States) Frank Mir def. interim champion Antônio Rodrigo Nogueira	UFC 92; Las Vegas, NV, US	Dec 27, 2008	—	
—	(United States) Shane Carwin def. Frank Mir for interim title	UFC 111; Newark, NJ, US	Mar 27, 2010	—	
15	(United States) Cain Velasquez	UFC 121; Anaheim, CA, US	Oct 23, 2010	385 days	
16	(Brazil) Junior dos Santos	UFC on Fox: Velasquez vs. dos Santos; Anaheim, CA, US	Nov 12, 2011	413 days	1. def. Frank Mir at UFC 146 on May 26, 2012
17	(United States) Cain Velasquez (2)	UFC 155; Las Vegas, NV, US	Dec 29, 2012	896 days (1,281 days)	1. def. Antônio Silva at UFC 160 on May 25, 2013; 2. def. Junior dos Santos at UFC 166 on Oct 19, 2013
—	(Brazil) Fabrício Werdum def. Mark Hunt for interim title	UFC 180; Mexico City, Mexico	Nov 15, 2014	—	
18	(Brazil) Fabrício Werdum	UFC 188; Mexico City, Mexico	Jun 13, 2015	336 days	
19	(United States) Stipe Miocic	UFC 198; Curitiba, Brazil	May 14, 2016	784 days	1. def. Alistair Overeem at UFC 203 on Sep 10, 2016; 2. def. Junior dos Santos at UFC 211 on May 13, 2017; 3. def. Francis Ngannou at UFC 220 on Jan 20, 2018
20	(United States) Daniel Cormier	UFC 226; Las Vegas, NV, US	Jul 7, 2018	406 days	1. def. Derrick Lewis at UFC 230 on Nov 3, 2018
21	(United States) Stipe Miocic (2)	UFC 241; Anaheim, CA, US	Aug 17, 2019	588 days (1,372 days)	1. def. Daniel Cormier at UFC 252 on Aug 15, 2020
22	(Cameroon) Francis Ngannou	UFC 260; Las Vegas, NV, US	Mar 27, 2021	659 days	1. def. interim champion Ciryl Gane at UFC 270 on Jan 22, 2022
—	(France) Ciryl Gane def. Derrick Lewis for interim title	UFC 265; Houston, TX, US	Aug 7, 2021	—	
Ngannou was stripped of the title on January 14, 2023 when he left the UFC due to a contract dispute.
23	(United States) Jon Jones def. Ciryl Gane	UFC 285; Las Vegas, NV, US	Mar 4, 2023	840 days	1. def. Stipe Miocic at UFC 309 on Nov 16, 2024
—	(England) Tom Aspinall def. Sergei Pavlovich for interim title	UFC 295; New York City, NY, US	Nov 11, 2023	—	1. def. Curtis Blaydes at UFC 304 on Jul 27, 2024
Jones vacated the title when he had his retirement announced on June 21, 2025.
24	(England) Tom Aspinall promoted to undisputed champion	—	Jun 21, 2025	450 days	NC. vs. Ciryl Gane at UFC 321 on Oct 25, 2025
—	(France) Ciryl Gane (2) def. Alex Pereira for interim title	UFC Freedom 250; Washington, D.C., US	Jun 14, 2026	—	
Aspinall vacated the title on September 14, 2026 due to ongoing complications from eye injuries.
25	(France) Ciryl Gane promoted to undisputed champion	—	Sep 14, 2026	63 days (incumbent)	1. def. Josh Hokit at UFC 334 on Nov 14, 2026

=== Light Heavyweight Championship ===
186 to 205 lb (84 to 93 kg)
The Light Heavyweight Championship was known as the Middleweight Championship prior to UFC 31 (May 4, 2001). The Pride World Middleweight Championship (205.03 lb) was unified with the UFC Light Heavyweight Championship on September 8, 2007, when Quinton Jackson defeated Dan Henderson at UFC 75.

No.	Name	Event	Date	Reign (Total)	Defenses
1	(United States) Frank Shamrock def. Kevin Jackson	UFC Japan; Yokohama, Japan	Dec 21, 1997	703 days	1. def. Igor Zinoviev at UFC 16 on Mar 13, 1998; 2. def. Jeremy Horn at UFC 17 on May 15, 1998; 3. def. John Lober at UFC Brazil on Oct 16, 1998; 4. def. Tito Ortiz at UFC 22 on Sep 24, 1999
Shamrock vacated the title on November 24, 1999, when he retired from the UFC, citing a lack of competition.
2	(United States) Tito Ortiz def. Wanderlei Silva	UFC 25; Tokyo, Japan	Apr 14, 2000	1,260 days	1. def. Yuki Kondo at UFC 29 on Dec 16, 2000; 2. def. Evan Tanner at UFC 30 on Feb 23, 2001; 3. def. Elvis Sinosic at UFC 32 on Jun 29, 2001; 4. def. Vladimir Matyushenko at UFC 33 on Sep 28, 2001; 5. def. Ken Shamrock at UFC 40 on Nov 22, 2002
—	(United States) Randy Couture def. Chuck Liddell for interim title	UFC 43; Las Vegas, NV, US	Jun 6, 2003	—	
3	(United States) Randy Couture	UFC 44; Las Vegas, NV, US	Sep 26, 2003	127 days	
4	(Brazil) Vitor Belfort	UFC 46; Las Vegas, NV, US	Jan 31, 2004	203 days	
5	(United States) Randy Couture (2)	UFC 49; Las Vegas, NV, US	Aug 21, 2004	238 days (365 days)	
6	(United States) Chuck Liddell	UFC 52; Las Vegas, NV, US	Apr 16, 2005	770 days	1. def. Jeremy Horn at UFC 54 on Aug 20, 2005; 2. def. Randy Couture at UFC 57 on Feb 4, 2006; 3. def. Renato Sobral at UFC 62 on Aug 26, 2006; 4. def. Tito Ortiz at UFC 66 on Dec 30, 2006
7	(United States) Quinton Jackson	UFC 71; Las Vegas, NV, US	May 26, 2007	406 days	1. def. Dan Henderson at UFC 75 on Sep 8, 2007
8	(United States) Forrest Griffin	UFC 86; Las Vegas, NV, US	Jul 5, 2008	175 days	
9	(United States) Rashad Evans	UFC 92; Las Vegas, NV, US	Dec 27, 2008	147 days	
10	(Brazil) Lyoto Machida	UFC 98; Las Vegas, NV, US	May 23, 2009	350 days	1. def. Maurício Rua at UFC 104 on Oct 24, 2009
11	(Brazil) Maurício Rua	UFC 113; Montreal, QC, Canada	May 8, 2010	315 days	
12	(United States) Jon Jones	UFC 128; Newark, NJ, US	Mar 19, 2011	1,501 days	1. def. Quinton Jackson at UFC 135 on Sep 24, 2011; 2. def. Lyoto Machida at UFC 140 on Dec 10, 2011; 3. def. Rashad Evans at UFC 145 on Apr 21, 2012; 4. def. Vitor Belfort at UFC 152 on Sep 22, 2012; 5. def. Chael Sonnen at UFC 159 on Apr 27, 2013; 6. def. Alexander Gustafsson at UFC 165 on Sep 21, 2013; 7. def. Glover Teixeira at UFC 172 on Apr 26, 2014; 8. def. Daniel Cormier at UFC 182 on Jan 3, 2015
Jones was stripped of the title on April 28, 2015, due to his involvement and arrest in a felony hit-and-run.
13	(United States) Daniel Cormier def. Anthony Johnson	UFC 187; Las Vegas, NV, US	May 23, 2015	1,315 days	1. def. Alexander Gustafsson at UFC 192 on Oct 3, 2015; 2. def. Anthony Johnson at UFC 210 on Apr 8, 2017; 3. def. Volkan Oezdemir at UFC 220 on Jan 20, 2018
—	(United States) Jon Jones def. Ovince Saint Preux for interim title	UFC 197; Las Vegas, NV, US	Apr 23, 2016	—	
Jones was stripped of the interim title on November 9, 2016, due to his one-year suspension related to a failed pre-fight drug test.
Jones won the undisputed title at UFC 214 on July 29, 2017, but was stripped on September 13, 2017, after his win was overturned to a no-contest due to a failed pre-fight drug test. Cormier was then retroactively reinstated as champion.
Cormier vacated the title on December 28, 2018, 174 days after winning the heavyweight title.
14	(United States) Jon Jones (2) def. Alexander Gustafsson	UFC 232; Inglewood, CA, US	Dec 29, 2018	597 days (2,098 days)	1. def. Anthony Smith at UFC 235 on Mar 2, 2019; 2. def. Thiago Santos at UFC 239 on Jul 6, 2019; 3. def. Dominick Reyes at UFC 247 on Feb 8, 2020
Jones vacated the title on August 17, 2020, citing issues with the UFC over salary negotiation and the desire to compete at heavyweight.
15	(Poland) Jan Błachowicz def. Dominick Reyes	UFC 253; Abu Dhabi, UAE	Sep 27, 2020	398 days	1. def. Israel Adesanya at UFC 259 on Mar 6, 2021
16	(Brazil) Glover Teixeira	UFC 267; Abu Dhabi, UAE	Oct 30, 2021	225 days	
17	(Czech Republic) Jiří Procházka	UFC 275; Kallang, Singapore	Jun 12, 2022	164 days	
Procházka vacated the title on November 23, 2022, after suffering a severe shoulder injury.
Jan Błachowicz and Magomed Ankalaev fought to a draw for the vacant title on December 10, 2022, at UFC 282 in Las Vegas, NV, US.
18	(United States) Jamahal Hill def. Glover Teixeira	UFC 283; Rio de Janeiro, Brazil	Jan 21, 2023	174 days	
Hill vacated the title on July 14, 2023, after suffering an achilles tendon rupture.
19	(Brazil) Alex Pereira def. Jiří Procházka	UFC 295; New York City, NY, US	Nov 11, 2023	483 days	1. def. Jamahal Hill at UFC 300 on Apr 13, 2024; 2. def. Jiří Procházka at UFC 303 on Jun 29, 2024; 3. def. Khalil Rountree Jr. at UFC 307 on Oct 5, 2024
20	(Russia) Magomed Ankalaev	UFC 313; Las Vegas, NV, US	Mar 8, 2025	210 days	
21	(Brazil) Alex Pereira (2)	UFC 320; Las Vegas, NV, US	Oct 4, 2025	189 days (672 days)	
Pereira announced on February 27, 2026, that he was vacating the title to move up to heavyweight. The title was officially vacated on April 11, 2026.
22	(New Zealand) Carlos Ulberg def. Jiří Procházka	UFC 327; Miami, FL, US	Apr 11, 2026	219 days (incumbent)	

=== Middleweight Championship ===
171 to 185 lb (78 to 84 kg)
The Pride World Welterweight Championship (182.98 lb) was unified with the UFC Middleweight Championship on March 1, 2008, when Anderson Silva defeated Dan Henderson at UFC 82.

No.	Name	Event	Date	Reign	Defenses
1	(United States) Dave Menne def. Gil Castillo	UFC 33; Las Vegas, NV, US	Sep 28, 2001	105 days	
2	(Brazil) Murilo Bustamante	UFC 35; Las Vegas, NV, US	Jan 11, 2002	267 days	1. def. Matt Lindland at UFC 37 on May 10, 2002
Bustamante was stripped of the title on October 5, 2002, when he left the UFC for Pride.
3	(United States) Evan Tanner def. David Terrell	UFC 51; Las Vegas, NV, US	Feb 5, 2005	119 days	
4	(United States) Rich Franklin	UFC 53; Atlantic City, NJ, US	Jun 4, 2005	497 days	1. def. Nate Quarry at UFC 56 on Nov 19, 2005; 2. def. David Loiseau at UFC 58 on Mar 4, 2006
5	(Brazil) Anderson Silva	UFC 64; Las Vegas, NV, US	Oct 14, 2006	2,457 days	1. def. Nate Marquardt at UFC 73 on Jul 7, 2007; 2. def. Rich Franklin at UFC 77 on Oct 20, 2007; 3. def. Dan Henderson at UFC 82 on Mar 1, 2008; 4. def. Patrick Côté at UFC 90 on Oct 25, 2008; 5. def. Thales Leites at UFC 97 on Apr 18, 2009; 6. def. Demian Maia at UFC 112 on Apr 10, 2010; 7. def. Chael Sonnen at UFC 117 on Aug 7, 2010; 8. def. Vitor Belfort at UFC 126 on Feb 5, 2011; 9. def. Yushin Okami at UFC 134 on Aug 27, 2011; 10. def. Chael Sonnen at UFC 148 on Jul 7, 2012
6	(United States) Chris Weidman	UFC 162; Las Vegas, NV, US	Jul 6, 2013	889 days	1. def. Anderson Silva at UFC 168 on Dec 28, 2013; 2. def. Lyoto Machida at UFC 175 on Jul 5, 2014; 3. def. Vitor Belfort at UFC 187 on May 23, 2015
7	(United States) Luke Rockhold	UFC 194; Las Vegas, NV, US	Dec 12, 2015	175 days	
8	(England) Michael Bisping	UFC 199; Inglewood, CA, US	Jun 4, 2016	518 days	1. def. Dan Henderson at UFC 204 on Oct 8, 2016
—	(Australia) Robert Whittaker def. Yoel Romero for interim title	UFC 213; Las Vegas, NV, US	Jul 8, 2017	—	
9	(Canada) Georges St-Pierre	UFC 217; New York City, NY, US	Nov 4, 2017	33 days	
St-Pierre vacated the title on December 7, 2017, due to ulcerative colitis.
10	(Australia) Robert Whittaker promoted to undisputed champion	—	Dec 7, 2017	660 days	
—	(Nigeria) Israel Adesanya def. Kelvin Gastelum for interim title	UFC 236; Atlanta, GA, US	Apr 13, 2019	—	
11	(Nigeria) Israel Adesanya	UFC 243; Melbourne, Australia	Oct 6, 2019	1,134 days	1. def. Yoel Romero at UFC 248 on Mar 7, 2020; 2. def. Paulo Costa at UFC 253 on Sep 27, 2020; 3. def. Marvin Vettori at UFC 263 on Jun 12, 2021; 4. def. Robert Whittaker at UFC 271 on Feb 12, 2022; 5. def. Jared Cannonier at UFC 276 on Jul 2, 2022
12	(Brazil) Alex Pereira	UFC 281; New York City, NY, US	Nov 12, 2022	147 days	
13	(Nigeria) Israel Adesanya (2)	UFC 287; Miami, FL, US	Apr 8, 2023	155 days (1,289 days)	
14	(United States) Sean Strickland	UFC 293; Sydney, Australia	Sep 10, 2023	132 days	
15	(South Africa) Dricus du Plessis	UFC 297; Toronto, ON, Canada	Jan 20, 2024	574 days	1. def. Israel Adesanya at UFC 305 on Aug 18, 2024; 2. def. Sean Strickland at UFC 312 on Feb 9, 2025
16	(United Arab Emirates) Khamzat Chimaev	UFC 319; Chicago, IL, US	Aug 16, 2025	266 days	
17	(United States) Sean Strickland (2)	UFC 328; Newark, NJ, US	May 9, 2026	191 days (incumbent)	

=== Welterweight Championship ===
156 to 170 lb (71 to 77 kg)
The Welterweight Championship was known as the Lightweight Championship prior to UFC 31 (May 4, 2001).

No.	Name	Event	Date	Reign (Total)	Defenses
1	(United States) Pat Miletich def. Mikey Burnett	UFC Brazil; São Paulo, Brazil	Oct 16, 1998	931 days	1. def. Jorge Patino at UFC 18 on Jan 8, 1999; 2. def. André Pederneiras at UFC 21 on Jul 16, 1999; 3. def. John Alessio at UFC 26 on Jun 9, 2000; 4. def. Kenichi Yamamoto at UFC 29 on Dec 16, 2000
2	(Canada) Carlos Newton	UFC 31; Atlantic City, NJ, US	May 4, 2001	183 days	
3	(United States) Matt Hughes	UFC 34; Las Vegas, NV, US	Nov 2, 2001	820 days	1. def. Hayato Sakurai at UFC 36 on Mar 22, 2002; 2. def. Carlos Newton at UFC 38 on Jul 13, 2002; 3. def. Gil Castillo at UFC 40 on Nov 22, 2002; 4. def. Sean Sherk at UFC 42 on Apr 25, 2003; 5. def. Frank Trigg at UFC 45 on Nov 21, 2003
4	(United States) B.J. Penn	UFC 46; Las Vegas, NV, US	Jan 31, 2004	107 days	
Penn was stripped of the title on May 17, 2004, when he left the UFC for K-1.
5	(United States) Matt Hughes (2) def. Georges St-Pierre	UFC 50; Atlantic City, NJ, US	Oct 22, 2004	757 days (1,577 days)	1. def. Frank Trigg at UFC 52 on Apr 16, 2005; 2. def. B.J. Penn at UFC 63 on Sep 23, 2006
6	(Canada) Georges St-Pierre	UFC 65; Sacramento, CA, US	Nov 18, 2006	140 days	
7	(United States) Matt Serra	UFC 69; Houston, TX, US	Apr 7, 2007	378 days	
—	(Canada) Georges St-Pierre def. Matt Hughes for interim title	UFC 79; Las Vegas, NV, US	Dec 29, 2007	—	
8	(Canada) Georges St-Pierre (2)	UFC 83; Montreal, QC, Canada	Apr 19, 2008	2,064 days (2,204 days)	1. def. Jon Fitch at UFC 87 on Aug 9, 2008; 2. def. B.J. Penn at UFC 94 on Jan 31, 2009; 3. def. Thiago Alves at UFC 100 on Jul 11, 2009; 4. def. Dan Hardy at UFC 111 on Mar 27, 2010; 5. def. Josh Koscheck at UFC 124 on Dec 11, 2010; 6. def. Jake Shields at UFC 129 on Apr 30, 2011; 7. def. interim champion Carlos Condit at UFC 154 on Nov 17, 2012; 8. def. Nick Diaz at UFC 158 on Mar 16, 2013; 9. def. Johny Hendricks at UFC 167 on Nov 16, 2013
—	(United States) Carlos Condit def. Nick Diaz for interim title	UFC 143; Las Vegas, NV, US	Feb 4, 2012	—	
St-Pierre vacated the title on December 13, 2013, when he decided to take time off.
9	(United States) Johny Hendricks def. Robbie Lawler	UFC 171; Dallas, TX, US	Mar 15, 2014	266 days	
10	(United States) Robbie Lawler	UFC 181; Las Vegas, NV, US	Dec 6, 2014	602 days	1. def. Rory MacDonald at UFC 189 on Jul 11, 2015; 2. def. Carlos Condit at UFC 195 on Jan 2, 2016
11	(United States) Tyron Woodley	UFC 201; Atlanta, GA, US	Jul 30, 2016	945 days	1. drew with Stephen Thompson at UFC 205 on Nov 12, 2016; 2. def. Stephen Thompson at UFC 209 on Mar 4, 2017; 3. def. Demian Maia at UFC 214 on Jul 29, 2017; 4. def. Darren Till at UFC 228 on Sep 8, 2018
—	(United States) Colby Covington def. Rafael dos Anjos for interim title	UFC 225; Chicago, IL, US	Jun 9, 2018	—	
Covington was stripped of the interim title on September 8, 2018, due to injury.
12	(Nigeria) Kamaru Usman	UFC 235; Las Vegas, NV, US	Mar 2, 2019	1,267 days	1. def. Colby Covington at UFC 245 on Dec 14, 2019; 2. def. Jorge Masvidal at UFC 251 on Jul 12, 2020; 3. def. Gilbert Burns at UFC 258 on Feb 13, 2021; 4. def. Jorge Masvidal at UFC 261 on Apr 24, 2021; 5. def. Colby Covington at UFC 268 on Nov 6, 2021
13	(England) Leon Edwards	UFC 278; Salt Lake City, UT, US	Aug 20, 2022	707 days	1. def. Kamaru Usman at UFC 286 on Mar 18, 2023; 2. def. Colby Covington at UFC 296 on Dec 16, 2023
14	(United States) Belal Muhammad	UFC 304; Manchester, England	Jul 27, 2024	287 days	
15	(Australia) Jack Della Maddalena	UFC 315; Montreal, QC, Canada	May 10, 2025	189 days	
16	(Russia) Islam Makhachev	UFC 322; New York City, NY, US	Nov 15, 2025	366 days (incumbent)	1. def. Ian Machado Garry at UFC 330 on Aug 15, 2026

=== Lightweight Championship ===
146 to 155 lb (66 to 70 kg)
The Lightweight Championship was known as the Bantamweight Championship prior to UFC 31 (May 4, 2001). The Strikeforce Lightweight Championship was unified (perhaps unofficially) with the UFC Lightweight Championship on April 20, 2013, when Benson Henderson defeated Gilbert Melendez at UFC on Fox: Henderson vs. Melendez.

No.	Name	Event	Date	Reign (Total)	Defenses
1	(United States) Jens Pulver def. Caol Uno	UFC 30; Atlantic City, NJ, US	Feb 23, 2001	393 days	1. def. Dennis Hallman at UFC 33 on Sep 28, 2001; 2. def. B.J. Penn at UFC 35 on Jan 11, 2002
Pulver was stripped of the title on March 23, 2002, when he left the UFC due to a contract dispute.
B.J. Penn and Caol Uno fought to a draw on February 28, 2003, at UFC 41 in Atlantic City, NJ, US in the finale of a four-man tournament for the vacant title.
2	(United States) Sean Sherk def. Kenny Florian	UFC 64; Las Vegas, NV, US	Oct 14, 2006	420 days	1. def. Hermes França at UFC 73 on Jul 7, 2007
Sherk was stripped of the title on December 8, 2007, after testing positive for anabolic steroids in a post-fight drug test.
3	(United States) B.J. Penn def. Joe Stevenson	UFC 80; Newcastle, England	Jan 19, 2008	812 days	1. def. Sean Sherk at UFC 84 on May 24, 2008; 2. def. Kenny Florian at UFC 101 on Aug 8, 2009; 3. def. Diego Sanchez at UFC 107 on Dec 12, 2009
4	(United States) Frankie Edgar	UFC 112; Abu Dhabi, UAE	Apr 10, 2010	687 days	1. def. B.J. Penn at UFC 118 on Aug 28, 2010; 2. drew with Gray Maynard at UFC 125 on Jan 1, 2011; 3. def. Gray Maynard at UFC 136 on Oct 8, 2011
5	(United States) Benson Henderson	UFC 144; Saitama, Japan	Feb 26, 2012	552 days	1. def. Frankie Edgar at UFC 150 on Aug 11, 2012; 2. def. Nate Diaz at UFC on Fox: Henderson vs. Diaz on Dec 8, 2012; 3. def. Gilbert Melendez at UFC on Fox: Henderson vs. Melendez on Apr 20, 2013
6	(United States) Anthony Pettis	UFC 164; Milwaukee, WI, US	Aug 31, 2013	560 days	1. def. Gilbert Melendez at UFC 181 on Dec 6, 2014
7	(Brazil) Rafael dos Anjos	UFC 185; Dallas, TX, US	Mar 14, 2015	481 days	1. def. Donald Cerrone at UFC on Fox: dos Anjos vs. Cowboy 2 on Dec 19, 2015
8	(United States) Eddie Alvarez	UFC Fight Night: dos Anjos vs. Alvarez; Las Vegas, NV, US	Jul 7, 2016	128 days	
9	(Republic of Ireland) Conor McGregor	UFC 205; New York City, NY, US	Nov 12, 2016	511 days	
—	(United States) Tony Ferguson def. Kevin Lee for interim title	UFC 216; Las Vegas, NV, US	Oct 7, 2017	—	
Both McGregor and Ferguson were stripped of their titles on April 7, 2018, due to inactivity and injury, respectively.
10	(Russia) Khabib Nurmagomedov def. Al Iaquinta	UFC 223; Brooklyn, NY, US	Apr 7, 2018	1,077 days	1. def. Conor McGregor at UFC 229 on Oct 6, 2018; 2. def. interim champion Dustin Poirier at UFC 242 on Sep 7, 2019; 3. def. interim champion Justin Gaethje at UFC 254 on Oct 24, 2020
—	(United States) Dustin Poirier def. Max Holloway for interim title	UFC 236; Atlanta, GA, US	Apr 13, 2019	—	
—	(United States) Justin Gaethje def. Tony Ferguson for interim title	UFC 249; Jacksonville, FL, US	May 9, 2020	—	
Nurmagomedov announced his retirement on October 24, 2020. The title was officially vacated on March 19, 2021.
11	(Brazil) Charles Oliveira def. Michael Chandler	UFC 262; Houston, TX, US	May 15, 2021	357 days	1. def. Dustin Poirier at UFC 269 on Dec 11, 2021
Oliveira was stripped of the title on May 7, 2022 after failing to make weight for his title defense against Justin Gaethje at UFC 274.
12	(Russia) Islam Makhachev def. Charles Oliveira	UFC 280; Abu Dhabi, UAE	Oct 22, 2022	980 days	1. def. Alexander Volkanovski at UFC 284 on Feb 12, 2023; 2. def. Alexander Volkanovski at UFC 294 on Oct 21, 2023; 3. def. Dustin Poirier at UFC 302 on Jun 1, 2024; 4. def. Renato Moicano at UFC 311 on Jan 18, 2025
Makhachev announced on May 13, 2025, that he was vacating the title to move up to welterweight. The title was officially vacated on June 28, 2025.
13	(Georgia (country)) Ilia Topuria def. Charles Oliveira	UFC 317; Las Vegas, NV, US	Jun 28, 2025	351 days	
—	(United States) Justin Gaethje (2) def. Paddy Pimblett for interim title	UFC 324; Las Vegas, NV, US	Jan 24, 2026	—	
14	(United States) Justin Gaethje	UFC Freedom 250; Washington, D.C., US	Jun 14, 2026	155 days (incumbent)	

=== Featherweight Championship ===
136 to 145 lb (61 to 66 kg)
Prior to the UFC-WEC merger, José Aldo was the WEC Featherweight Champion. Aldo was awarded the inaugural UFC Featherweight Championship on November 20, 2010, at UFC 123 in a ceremony prior to the event.

No.	Name	Event	Date	Reign (Total)	Defenses
1	(Brazil) José Aldo promoted to undisputed champion	UFC 123; Auburn Hills, MI, US	Nov 20, 2010	1,848 days	1. def. Mark Hominick at UFC 129 on Apr 30, 2011; 2. def. Kenny Florian at UFC 136 on Oct 8, 2011; 3. def. Chad Mendes at UFC 142 on Jan 14, 2012; 4. def. Frankie Edgar at UFC 156 on Feb 2, 2013; 5. def. Jung Chan-sung at UFC 163 on Aug 3, 2013; 6. def. Ricardo Lamas at UFC 169 on Feb 1, 2014; 7. def. Chad Mendes at UFC 179 on Oct 25, 2014
—	(Republic of Ireland) Conor McGregor def. Chad Mendes for interim title	UFC 189; Las Vegas, NV, US	Jul 11, 2015	—	
2	(Republic of Ireland) Conor McGregor	UFC 194; Las Vegas, NV, US	Dec 12, 2015	350 days	
—	(Brazil) José Aldo def. Frankie Edgar for interim title	UFC 200; Las Vegas, NV, US	Jul 9, 2016	—	
McGregor was stripped of the title on November 26, 2016, 14 days after winning the lightweight title.
3	(Brazil) José Aldo (2) promoted to undisputed champion	—	Nov 26, 2016	189 days (2,037 days)	
—	(United States) Max Holloway def. Anthony Pettis for interim title	UFC 206; Toronto, ON, Canada	Dec 10, 2016	—	
4	(United States) Max Holloway	UFC 212; Rio de Janeiro, Brazil	Jun 3, 2017	925 days	1. def. José Aldo at UFC 218 on Dec 2, 2017; 2. def. Brian Ortega at UFC 231 on Dec 8, 2018; 3. def. Frankie Edgar at UFC 240 on Jul 27, 2019
5	(Australia) Alexander Volkanovski	UFC 245; Las Vegas, NV, US	Dec 14, 2019	1,526 days	1. def. Max Holloway at UFC 251 on Jul 12, 2020; 2. def. Brian Ortega at UFC 266 on Sep 25, 2021; 3. def. Jung Chan-sung at UFC 273 on Apr 9, 2022; 4. def. Max Holloway at UFC 276 on Jul 2, 2022; 5. def. interim champion Yair Rodríguez at UFC 290 on Jul 8, 2023
—	(Mexico) Yair Rodríguez def. Josh Emmett for interim title	UFC 284; Perth, Australia	Feb 12, 2023	—	
6	(Georgia (country)) Ilia Topuria	UFC 298; Anaheim, CA, US	Feb 17, 2024	419 days	1. def. Max Holloway at UFC 308 on Oct 26, 2024
Topuria announced on February 19, 2025, that he was vacating the title to move up to lightweight. The title was officially vacated on April 12, 2025.
7	(Australia) Alexander Volkanovski (2) def. Diego Lopes	UFC 314; Miami, FL, US	Apr 12, 2025	583 days (incumbent)	1. def. Diego Lopes at UFC 325 on Feb 1, 2026; 2. def. Movsar Evloev at UFC 333 on Oct 24, 2026

=== Bantamweight Championship ===
126 to 135 lb (57 to 61 kg)
Prior to UFC-WEC merger, Dominick Cruz was the WEC Bantamweight Champion. At WEC 53, Cruz defeated Scott Jorgensen to retain the WEC Bantamweight Championship and was awarded the inaugural UFC Bantamweight Championship.

No.	Name	Event	Date	Reign (Total)	Defenses
1	(United States) Dominick Cruz def. Scott Jorgensen	WEC 53; Glendale, AZ, US	Dec 16, 2010	1,117 days	1. def. Urijah Faber at UFC 132 on Jul 2, 2011; 2. def. Demetrious Johnson at UFC Live: Cruz vs. Johnson on Oct 1, 2011
—	(Brazil) Renan Barão def. Urijah Faber for interim title	UFC 149; Calgary, AB, Canada	Jul 21, 2012	—	1. def. Michael McDonald at UFC on Fuel TV: Barão vs. McDonald on Feb 16, 2013; 2. def. Eddie Wineland at UFC 165 on Sep 21, 2013
Cruz vacated the title on January 6, 2014, after repeated injuries prevented him from returning to competition to defend his title.
2	(Brazil) Renan Barão promoted to undisputed champion	—	Jan 6, 2014	138 days	1. def. Urijah Faber at UFC 169 on Feb 1, 2014
3	(United States) T.J. Dillashaw	UFC 173; Las Vegas, NV, US	May 24, 2014	603 days	1. def. Joe Soto at UFC 177 on Aug 30, 2014; 2. def. Renan Barão at UFC on Fox: Dillashaw vs. Barão 2 on Jul 25, 2015
4	(United States) Dominick Cruz (2)	UFC Fight Night: Dillashaw vs. Cruz; Boston, MA, US	Jan 17, 2016	348 days (1,465 days)	1. def. Urijah Faber at UFC 199 on Jun 4, 2016
5	(United States) Cody Garbrandt	UFC 207; Las Vegas, NV, US	Dec 30, 2016	309 days	
6	(United States) T.J. Dillashaw (2)	UFC 217; New York City, NY, US	Nov 4, 2017	501 days (1,104 days)	1. def. Cody Garbrandt at UFC 227 on Aug 4, 2018
Dillashaw vacated the title on March 20, 2019, due to a failed drug test.
7	(United States) Henry Cejudo def. Marlon Moraes	UFC 238; Chicago, IL, US	Jun 8, 2019	352 days	1. def. Dominick Cruz at UFC 249 on May 9, 2020
Cejudo announced his retirement on May 9, 2020. The title was officially vacated on May 24, 2020.
8	(Russia) Petr Yan def. José Aldo	UFC 251; Abu Dhabi, UAE	Jul 12, 2020	237 days	
9	(United States) Aljamain Sterling	UFC 259; Las Vegas, NV, US	Mar 6, 2021	896 days	1. def. interim champion Petr Yan at UFC 273 on Apr 9, 2022; 2. def. T.J. Dillashaw at UFC 280 on Oct 22, 2022; 3. def. Henry Cejudo at UFC 288 on May 6, 2023
—	(Russia) Petr Yan def. Cory Sandhagen for interim title	UFC 267; Abu Dhabi, UAE	Oct 30, 2021	—	
10	(United States) Sean O'Malley	UFC 292; Boston, MA, US	Aug 19, 2023	393 days	1. def. Marlon Vera at UFC 299 on Mar 9, 2024
11	(Georgia (country)) Merab Dvalishvili	UFC 306; Las Vegas, NV, US	Sep 14, 2024	448 days	1. def. Umar Nurmagomedov at UFC 311 on Jan 18, 2025; 2. def. Sean O'Malley at UFC 316 on Jun 7, 2025; 3. def. Cory Sandhagen at UFC 320 on Oct 4, 2025
12	(Russia) Petr Yan (2)	UFC 323; Las Vegas, NV, US	Dec 6, 2025	345 days (incumbent)	1. def. Merab Dvalishvili at UFC 333 on Oct 24, 2026

=== Flyweight Championship ===
116 to 125 lb (53 to 57 kg)
Demetrious Johnson defeated Joseph Benavidez on September 22, 2012, at UFC 152 in Toronto, Ontario, Canada in the finale of a four-man tournament for the inaugural title.

No.	Name	Event	Date	Reign (Total)	Defenses
1	(United States) Demetrious Johnson def. Joseph Benavidez	UFC 152; Toronto, ON, Canada	Sep 22, 2012	2,142 days	1. def. John Dodson at UFC on Fox: Johnson vs. Dodson on Jan 26, 2013; 2. def. John Moraga at UFC on Fox: Johnson vs. Moraga on Jul 27, 2013; 3. def. Joseph Benavidez at UFC on Fox: Johnson vs. Benavidez 2 on Dec 14, 2013; 4. def. Ali Bagautinov at UFC 174 on June 14, 2014; 5. def. Chris Cariaso at UFC 178 on Sep 27, 2014; 6. def. Kyoji Horiguchi at UFC 186 on Apr 25, 2015; 7. def. John Dodson at UFC 191 on Sep 5, 2015; 8. def. Henry Cejudo at UFC 197 on Apr 23, 2016; 9. def. Tim Elliott at The Ultimate Fighter: Tournament of Champions Finale on Dec 3, 2016; 10. def. Wilson Reis at UFC on Fox: Johnson vs. Reis on Apr 15, 2017; 11. def. Ray Borg at UFC 216 on Oct 7, 2017
2	(United States) Henry Cejudo	UFC 227; Los Angeles, CA, US	Aug 4, 2018	574 days	1. def. T.J. Dillashaw at UFC Fight Night: Cejudo vs. Dillashaw on Jan 19, 2019
Cejudo announced on December 20, 2019, that he would vacate his title to focus on defending the bantamweight title. The title was officially vacated on February 29, 2020.
3	(Brazil) Deiveson Figueiredo def. Joseph Benavidez	UFC Fight Night: Figueiredo vs. Benavidez 2 Abu Dhabi, UAE	Jul 19, 2020	328 days	1. def. Alex Perez at UFC 255 on Nov 21, 2020; 2. drew with Brandon Moreno at UFC 256 on Dec 12, 2020
4	(Mexico) Brandon Moreno	UFC 263; Glendale, AZ, US	Jun 12, 2021	224 days	
5	(Brazil) Deiveson Figueiredo (2)	UFC 270; Anaheim, CA, US	Jan 22, 2022	364 days (692 days)	
—	(Mexico) Brandon Moreno def. Kai Kara-France for interim title	UFC 277; Dallas, TX, US	Jul 30, 2022	—	
6	(Mexico) Brandon Moreno (2)	UFC 283; Rio de Janeiro, Brazil	Jan 21, 2023	168 days (392 days)	
7	(Brazil) Alexandre Pantoja	UFC 290; Las Vegas, NV, US	Jul 8, 2023	882 days	1. def. Brandon Royval at UFC 296 on Dec 16, 2023; 2. def. Steve Erceg at UFC 301 on May 4, 2024; 3. def. Kai Asakura at UFC 310 on Dec 7, 2024; 4. def. Kai Kara-France at UFC 317 on Jun 28, 2025
8	(Myanmar) Joshua Van	UFC 323; Las Vegas, NV, US	Dec 6, 2025	345 days (incumbent)	1. def. Tatsuro Taira at UFC 328 on May 9, 2026; 2. def. Alexandre Pantoja at UFC 331 on Sep 19, 2026

== Women's championship history ==
=== Women's Bantamweight Championship ===
126 to 135 lb (57 to 61 kg)
Prior to its folding and absorption by the UFC, Ronda Rousey was the Strikeforce Women's Bantamweight Champion. Rousey was awarded the inaugural UFC Women's Bantamweight Championship on December 6, 2012, at a UFC on Fox: Henderson vs. Diaz pre-event press conference.

No.	Name	Event	Date	Reign	Defenses
1	(United States) Ronda Rousey promoted to undisputed champion	UFC on Fox: Henderson vs. Diaz; Seattle, WA, US	Dec 6, 2012	1,074 days	1. def. Liz Carmouche at UFC 157 on Feb 23, 2013; 2. def. Miesha Tate at UFC 168 on Dec 28, 2013; 3. def. Sara McMann at UFC 170 on Feb 22, 2014; 4. def. Alexis Davis at UFC 175 on Jul 5, 2014; 5. def. Cat Zingano at UFC 184 on Feb 28, 2015; 6. def. Bethe Correia at UFC 190 on Aug 1, 2015
2	(United States) Holly Holm	UFC 193; Melbourne, Australia	Nov 15, 2015	111 days	
3	(United States) Miesha Tate	UFC 196; Las Vegas, NV, US	Mar 5, 2016	126 days	
4	(Brazil) Amanda Nunes	UFC 200; Las Vegas, NV, US	Jul 9, 2016	1,981 days	1. def. Ronda Rousey at UFC 207 on Dec 30, 2016; 2. def. Valentina Shevchenko at UFC 215 on Sep 9, 2017; 3. def. Raquel Pennington at UFC 224 on May 12, 2018; 4. def. Holly Holm at UFC 239 on Jul 6, 2019; 5. def. Germaine de Randamie at UFC 245 on Dec 14, 2019
5	(United States) Julianna Peña	UFC 269; Las Vegas, NV, US	Dec 11, 2021	232 days	
6	(Brazil) Amanda Nunes (2)	UFC 277; Dallas, TX, US	Jul 30, 2022	325 days (2,306 days)	1. def. Irene Aldana at UFC 289 on Jun 10, 2023
Nunes announced her retirement on June 10, 2023. The title was officially vacated on June 20, 2023.
7	(United States) Raquel Pennington def. Mayra Bueno Silva	UFC 297; Toronto, ON, Canada	Jan 20, 2024	255 days	
8	(United States) Julianna Peña (2)	UFC 307; Salt Lake City, UT, US	Oct 5, 2024	242 days (474 days)	
9	(United States) Kayla Harrison	UFC 316; Newark, NJ, US	Jun 7, 2025	527 days (incumbent)	1. def. Amanda Nunes at UFC 334 on Nov 14, 2026

=== Women's Flyweight Championship ===
116 to 125 lb (53 to 57 kg)
The inaugural title was contested on December 1, 2017, in Las Vegas, NV, US at The Ultimate Fighter: A New World Champion Finale. The inaugural title fight was between two fighters who appeared on the 26th season of The Ultimate Fighter.

No.	Name	Event	Date	Reign	Defenses
1	(United States) Nicco Montaño def. Roxanne Modafferi	The Ultimate Fighter: A New World Champion Finale; Las Vegas, NV, US	Dec 1, 2017	280 days	
Montaño was stripped of the title on September 7, 2018, after she was forced to withdraw from her title defense at UFC 228 due to weight cut issues.
2	(Kyrgyzstan) Valentina Shevchenko def. Joanna Jędrzejczyk	UFC 231; Toronto, ON, Canada	Dec 8, 2018	1,547 days	1. def. Jessica Eye at UFC 238 on Jun 8, 2019; 2. def. Liz Carmouche at UFC Fight Night: Shevchenko vs. Carmouche 2 on Aug 10, 2019; 3. def. Katlyn Chookagian at UFC 247 on Feb 8, 2020; 4. def. Jennifer Maia at UFC 255 on Nov 21, 2020; 5. def. Jéssica Andrade at UFC 261 on Apr 24, 2021; 6. def. Lauren Murphy at UFC 266 on Sep 25, 2021; 7. def. Taila Santos at UFC 275 on Jun 12, 2022
3	(Mexico) Alexa Grasso	UFC 285; Las Vegas, NV, US	Mar 4, 2023	561 days	1. drew with Valentina Shevchenko at UFC Fight Night: Grasso vs. Shevchenko 2 on Sep 16, 2023
4	(Kyrgyzstan) Valentina Shevchenko (2)	UFC 306; Las Vegas, NV, US	Sep 14, 2024	749 days (2,296 days)	1. def. Manon Fiorot at UFC 315 on May 10, 2025; 2. def. Zhang Weili at UFC 322 on Nov 15, 2025
Shevchenko announced on September 5, 2026, that she would vacate the title after suffering an injury. The title was officially vacated on October 3, 2026.
5	(Brazil) Natália Silva def. Wang Cong	UFC 332; Salt Lake City, UT, US	Oct 3, 2026	44 days (incumbent)	

=== Women's Strawweight Championship ===
106 to 115 lb (48 to 52 kg)
Previously the Invicta FC Strawweight Champion, Carla Esparza defeated Rose Namajunas for the inaugural title on December 12, 2014, in the tournament finale of The Ultimate Fighter: A Champion Will Be Crowned.

No.	Name	Event	Date	Reign	Defenses
1	(United States) Carla Esparza def. Rose Namajunas	The Ultimate Fighter: A Champion Will Be Crowned Finale; Las Vegas, NV, US	Dec 12, 2014	92 days	
2	(Poland) Joanna Jędrzejczyk	UFC 185; Dallas, TX, US	Mar 14, 2015	966 days	1. def. Jessica Penne at UFC Fight Night: Jędrzejczyk vs. Penne on Jun 20, 2015; 2. def. Valérie Létourneau at UFC 193 on Nov 15, 2015; 3. def. Cláudia Gadelha at The Ultimate Fighter: Team Joanna vs. Team Cláudia Finale on Jul 8, 2016; 4. def. Karolina Kowalkiewicz at UFC 205 on Nov 12, 2016; 5. def. Jéssica Andrade at UFC 211 on May 13, 2017
3	(United States) Rose Namajunas	UFC 217; New York City, NY, US	Nov 4, 2017	554 days	1. def. Joanna Jędrzejczyk at UFC 223 on Apr 7, 2018
4	(Brazil) Jéssica Andrade	UFC 237; Rio de Janeiro, Brazil	May 11, 2019	112 days	
5	(China) Zhang Weili	UFC Fight Night: Andrade vs. Zhang; Shenzhen, China	Aug 31, 2019	603 days	1. def. Joanna Jędrzejczyk at UFC 248 on Mar 7, 2020
6	(United States) Rose Namajunas (2)	UFC 261; Jacksonville, FL, US	Apr 24, 2021	378 days (932 days)	1. def. Zhang Weili at UFC 268 on Nov 6, 2021
7	(United States) Carla Esparza (2)	UFC 274; Phoenix, AZ, US	May 7, 2022	190 days (282 days)	
8	(China) Zhang Weili (2)	UFC 281; New York City, NY, US	Nov 12, 2022	1,078 days (1,681 days)	1. def. Amanda Lemos at UFC 292 on Aug 19, 2023; 2. def. Yan Xiaonan at UFC 300 on Apr 13, 2024; 3. def. Tatiana Suarez at UFC 312 on Feb 9, 2025
Zhang announced on August 28, 2025, that she was vacating the title to move up to flyweight. The title was officially vacated on October 25, 2025.
9	(Brazil) Mackenzie Dern def. Virna Jandiroba	UFC 321; Abu Dhabi, UAE	Oct 25, 2025	387 days (incumbent)	1. def. Gillian Robertson at UFC 330 on Aug 15, 2026

== Symbolic titles ==
=== BMF Title ===
After UFC 241, Nate Diaz proclaimed himself as the “baddest motherfucker in the game”. Shortly after, Dana White announced a welterweight matchup between Diaz and Jorge Masvidal. Leading up to this fight, Dana White informed media outlets that the Diaz–Masvidal matchup would be for the title of “Baddest Motherfucker”, and a symbolic UFC title belt was created to be awarded to the winner of this matchup. The title belt, embossed with “BMF”, has since been on the line a number of times across multiple weight divisions and competitors should have "a willingness to go out on ones shield, be equipped with elite skill sets who enjoy, or even prefer, getting into an old-fashioned brawl, [and] rarely if ever play it safe".

Jorge Masvidal defeated Nate Diaz for the inaugural title of Baddest Mother Fucker "BMF", on November 2, 2019 in Madison Square Garden, New York City at UFC 244.

No.	Name	Event	Date	Division	Reign	Defenses
1	(United States) Jorge Masvidal def. Nate Diaz	UFC 244; New York City, NY, US	Nov 2, 2019	Welterweight	1,291 days	
Masvidal was stripped of the title on May 16, 2023, after he retired from mixed martial arts at UFC 287.
2	(United States) Justin Gaethje def. Dustin Poirier	UFC 291; Salt Lake City, UT, US	Jul 29, 2023	Lightweight	259 days	
3	(United States) Max Holloway	UFC 300; Las Vegas, NV, US	Apr 13, 2024	Lightweight	694 days	1. def. Dustin Poirier at UFC 318 on Jul 19, 2025
4	(Brazil) Charles Oliveira	UFC 326; Las Vegas, NV, US	Mar 7, 2026	Lightweight	254 days (incumbent)	

== Defunct titles ==
=== Superfight Championship ===
The openweight title used before the introduction of weight classes in 1997. It was designed to create a reigning UFC champion for the UFC tournament winners to challenge.

No.	Name	Event	Date	Reign	Defenses
Ken Shamrock and Royce Gracie fought to a draw on April 7, 1995, at UFC 5 in Charlotte, NC, US for the inaugural Superfight title.
1	(United States) Ken Shamrock def. Dan Severn	UFC 6 Casper, WY, US	Jul 14, 1995	308 days	1. drew with Oleg Taktarov at UFC 7 on Sep 8, 1995; 2. def. Kimo Leopoldo at UFC 8 on Feb 16, 1996
2	(United States) Dan Severn	UFC 9 Detroit, MI, US	May 17, 1996	266 days	
Mark Coleman defeated Severn on February 7, 1997, at UFC 12 in Dothan, AL, US. This bout unified the UFC Superfight Championship with the UFC 11 Tournament Championship to determine the inaugural UFC Heavyweight Champion.

=== Women's Featherweight Championship ===
136 to 145 lb (62 to 66 kg)
The inaugural title was contested on February 11, 2017, in Brooklyn, NY, US at UFC 208.

No.	Name	Event	Date	Reign	Defenses
1	(Netherlands) Germaine de Randamie def. Holly Holm	UFC 208; Brooklyn, NY, US	Feb 11, 2017	128 days	
de Randamie was stripped of the title on June 19, 2017, after she refused to defend the title against Cris Cyborg.
2	(Brazil) Cris Cyborg def. Tonya Evinger	UFC 214; Anaheim, CA, US	Jul 29, 2017	517 days	1. def. Holly Holm at UFC 219 on Dec 30, 2017; 2. def. Yana Kunitskaya at UFC 222 on Mar 3, 2018
3	(Brazil) Amanda Nunes	UFC 232; Inglewood, CA, US	Dec 29, 2018	1,634 days	1. def. Felicia Spencer at UFC 250 on Jun 6, 2020; 2. def. Megan Anderson at UFC 259 on Mar 6, 2021
Nunes announced her retirement on June 10, 2023. The title was officially vacated on June 20, 2023.

== Tournament winners ==
Event	Date	Division	Winner	Runner-up
UFC 1	Nov 12, 1993	Openweight	(Brazil) Royce Gracie	(Netherlands) Gerard Gordeau
UFC 2	Mar 11, 1994	Openweight	(Brazil) Royce Gracie (2)	(United States) Patrick Smith
UFC 3	Sep 9, 1994	Openweight	(United States) Steve Jennum	(Canada) Harold Howard
UFC 4	Dec 16, 1994	Openweight	(Brazil) Royce Gracie (3)	(United States) Dan Severn
UFC 5	Apr 7, 1995	Openweight	(United States) Dan Severn	(Canada) Dave Beneteau
UFC 6	Jul 14, 1995	Openweight	(Russia) Oleg Taktarov	(United States) Tank Abbott
UFC 7	Sep 8, 1995	Openweight	(Brazil) Marco Ruas	(United States) Paul Varelans
The Ultimate Ultimate	Dec 16, 1995	Openweight	(United States) Dan Severn (2)	(Russia) Oleg Taktarov
UFC 8	Feb 16, 1996	Openweight	(United States) Don Frye	(Canada) Gary Goodridge
UFC 10	Jul 12, 1996	Openweight	(United States) Mark Coleman	(United States) Don Frye
UFC 11	Sep 20, 1996	Openweight	(United States) Mark Coleman (2)	(United States) Scott Ferrozzo
The Ultimate Ultimate 2	Dec 7, 1996	Openweight	(United States) Don Frye (2)	(United States) Tank Abbott
UFC 12	Feb 7, 1997	Heavyweight	(Brazil) Vitor Belfort	(United States) Scott Ferrozzo
UFC 12	Feb 7, 1997	Light Heavyweight	(United States) Jerry Bohlander	(United States) Nick Sanzo
UFC 13	May 30, 1997	Heavyweight	(United States) Randy Couture	(United States) Steven Graham
UFC 13	May 30, 1997	LightHeavyweight	(United States) Guy Mezger	(United States) Tito Ortiz
UFC 14	Jul 27, 1997	Heavyweight	(United States) Mark Kerr	(United States) Dan Bobish
UFC 14	Jul 27, 1997	LightHeavyweight	(United States) Kevin Jackson	(United States) Tony Fryklund
UFC 15	Oct 17, 1997	Heavyweight	(United States) Mark Kerr (2)	(United States) Dwayne Cason
Ultimate Japan	Dec 21, 1997	Heavyweight	(Japan) Kazushi Sakuraba	(Brazil) Marcus Silveira
UFC 16	Mar 13, 1998	Welterweight	(United States) Pat Miletich	(United States) Chris Brennan
UFC 17	May 15, 1998	Middleweight	(United States) Dan Henderson	(Canada) Carlos Newton
UFC 23	Nov 19, 1999	Middleweight	(Japan) Kenichi Yamamoto	(Japan) Katsuhisa Fujii
UFC 39; UFC 41	Feb 28, 2003	Lightweight	B.J. Penn drew with Caol Uno in the finale of the 4-man tournament.	
UFC on FX 2 UFC on FX 3 UFC 152	Sep 22, 2012	Flyweight	(United States) Demetrious Johnson	(United States) Joseph Benavidez

== The Ultimate Fighter ==
The Ultimate Fighter (TUF) is a reality television series and mixed martial arts competition produced by the UFC. The show features professional fighters living together and competing against one another in a tournament for a contract with the UFC.

Season	Finale	Division	Winner	Runner-up
TUF 1: Team Couture vs. Team Liddell	Apr 9, 2005	Light Heavyweight	(United States) Forrest Griffin	(United States) Stephan Bonnar
TUF 1: Team Couture vs. Team Liddell	Apr 9, 2005	Middleweight	(United States) Diego Sanchez	(United States) Kenny Florian
TUF 2: Team Hughes vs. Team Franklin	Nov 5, 2005	Heavyweight	(United States) Rashad Evans	(United States) Brad Imes
TUF 2: Team Hughes vs. Team Franklin	Nov 5, 2005	Welterweight	(United States) Joe Stevenson	(United States) Luke Cummo
TUF 3: Team Ortiz vs. Team Shamrock	Jun 24, 2006	Middleweight	(United States) Kendall Grove	(United States) Ed Herman
TUF 3: Team Ortiz vs. Team Shamrock	Jun 24, 2006	Light Heavyweight	(England) Michael Bisping	(United States) Josh Haynes
TUF 4: The Comeback	Nov 11, 2006	Middleweight	(United States) Travis Lutter	(Canada) Patrick Côté
TUF 4: The Comeback	Nov 11, 2006	Welterweight	(United States) Matt Serra	(United States) Chris Lytle
TUF 5: Team Pulver vs. Team Penn	Jun 23, 2007	Lightweight	(United States) Nate Diaz	(Armenia) Manny Gamburyan
TUF 6: Team Hughes vs. Team Serra	Dec 8, 2007	Welterweight	(United States) Mac Danzig	(United States) Tom Speer
TUF 7: Team Rampage vs. Team Forrest	Jun 21, 2008	Middleweight	(United States) Amir Sadollah	(United States) C. B. Dollaway
TUF 8: Team Nogueira vs. Team Mir	Dec 13, 2008	Light Heavyweight	(United States) Ryan Bader	(Brazil) Vinny Magalhães
TUF 8: Team Nogueira vs. Team Mir	Dec 13, 2008	Lightweight	(Mexico) Efraín Escudero	(United States) Phillipe Nover
TUF 9: United States vs. United Kingdom	Jun 20, 2009	Lightweight	(England) Ross Pearson	(England) Andre Winner
TUF 9: United States vs. United Kingdom	Jun 20, 2009	Welterweight	(England) James Wilks	(United States) DaMarques Johnson
TUF 10: Heavyweights	Dec 5, 2009	Heavyweight	(United States) Roy Nelson	(United States) Brendan Schaub
TUF 11: Team Liddell vs. Team Ortiz	Jun 19, 2010	Middleweight	(United States) Court McGee	(United States) Kris McCray
TUF 12: Team GSP vs. Team Koscheck	Dec 4, 2010	Lightweight	(United States) Jonathan Brookins	(United States) Michael Johnson
TUF 13: Team Lesnar vs. Team dos Santos	Jun 4, 2011	Welterweight	(United States) Tony Ferguson	(United States) Ramsey Nijem
TUF 14: Team Bisping vs. Team Miller	Dec 3, 2011	Bantamweight	(United States) John Dodson	(United States) T.J. Dillashaw
TUF 14: Team Bisping vs. Team Miller	Dec 3, 2011	Featherweight	(Brazil) Diego Brandão	(United States) Dennis Bermudez
TUF 15: Live	Jun 1, 2012	Lightweight	(United States) Michael Chiesa	(United States) Al Iaquinta
TUF: Brazil	Jun 23, 2012	Featherweight	(Brazil) Rony Jason	(Brazil) Godofredo Pepey
TUF: Brazil	Jun 23, 2012	Middleweight	(Brazil) Cezar Ferreira	(Brazil) Sérgio Moraes
TUF 16: Team Carwin vs. Team Nelson	Dec 15, 2012	Welterweight	(United States) Colton Smith	(Canada) Mike Ricci
TUF: The Smashes	Dec 15, 2012	Lightweight	(Northern Ireland) Norman Parke	(England) Colin Fletcher
TUF: The Smashes	Dec 15, 2012	Welterweight	(Australia) Robert Whittaker	(England) Brad Scott
TUF 17: Team Jones vs. Team Sonnen	Apr 13, 2013	Middleweight	(United States) Kelvin Gastelum	(Jamaica) Uriah Hall
TUF: Brazil 2	Jun 8, 2013	Welterweight	(Brazil) Leonardo Santos	(Brazil) William Macario
TUF 18: Team Rousey vs. Team Tate	Nov 30, 2013	Bantamweight	(United States) Chris Holdsworth	(England) Davey Grant
TUF 18: Team Rousey vs. Team Tate	Nov 30, 2013	Women's Bantamweight	(United States) Julianna Peña	(Canada) Jessica Rakoczy
TUF: China	Mar 1, 2014	Welterweight	(China) Zhang Lipeng	(China) Wang Sai
TUF: China	Ago 23, 2014	Featherweight	(China) Ning Guangyou	(China) Yang Jianping
TUF Nations: Canada vs. Australia	Apr 16, 2014	Welterweight	(Canada) Chad Laprise	(Canada) Olivier Aubin-Mercier
TUF Nations: Canada vs. Australia	Apr 16, 2014	Middleweight	(Canada) Elias Theodorou	(Canada) Sheldon Westcott
TUF: Brazil 3	May 31, 2014	Middleweight	(Brazil) Warlley Alves	(Brazil) Márcio Alexandre Júnior
TUF: Brazil 3	May 31, 2014	Heavyweight	(Brazil) Antônio Carlos Júnior	(Brazil) Vitor Miranda
TUF 19: Team Edgar vs. Team Penn	Jul 6, 2014	Middleweight	(Jamaica) Eddie Gordon	(Brazil) Dhiego Lima
TUF 19: Team Edgar vs. Team Penn	Jul 6, 2014	Light Heavyweight	(United States) Corey Anderson	(United States) Matt Van Buren
TUF: Latin America	Nov 15, 2014	Bantamweight	(Mexico) Alejandro Pérez	(Mexico) José Alberto Quiñónez
TUF: Latin America	Nov 15, 2014	Featherweight	(Mexico) Yair Rodríguez	(Nicaragua) Leonardo Morales
TUF 20: A Champion Will Be Crowned	Dec 12, 2014	Women's Strawweight	(United States) Carla Esparza	(United States) Rose Namajunas
TUF 21: American Top Team vs. Blackzilians	Jul 12, 2015	Welterweight	(Nigeria) Kamaru Usman	(United States) Hayder Hassan
TUF: Brazil 4	Aug 1, 2015	Bantamweight	(Brazil) Reginaldo Vieira	(Brazil) Dileno Lopes
TUF: Brazil 4	Aug 1, 2015	Lightweight	(Brazil) Glaico França	(Brazil) Fernando Bruno
TUF: Latin America 2	Nov 21, 2015	Lightweight	(Peru) Enrique Barzola	(Mexico) Horacio Gutiérrez
TUF: Latin America 2	Nov 21, 2015	Welterweight	(Mexico) Erick Montaño	(Spain) Enrique Marín
TUF 22: Team McGregor vs. Team Faber	Dec 11, 2015	Lightweight	(United States) Ryan Hall	(Russia) Artem Lobov
TUF 23: Team Joanna vs. Team Cláudia	Jul 8, 2016	Women's Strawweight	(United States) Tatiana Suarez	(United States) Amanda Cooper
TUF 23: Team Joanna vs. Team Cláudia	Jul 8, 2016	Light Heavyweight	(United States) Andrew Sanchez	(United States) Khalil Rountree Jr.
TUF: Latin America 3	Nov 5, 2016	Lightweight	(Mexico) Martin Bravo	(Peru) Claudio Puelles
TUF 24: Tournament of Champions	Dec 3, 2016	Flyweight	(United States) Tim Elliott	(Japan) Hiromasa Ougikubo
TUF 25: Redemption	Jul 7, 2017	Welterweight	(United States) Jesse Taylor	(Brazil) Dhiego Lima
TUF 26: A New World Champion	Dec 1, 2017	Women's Flyweight	(United States) Nicco Montaño	(United States) Roxanne Modafferi
TUF 27: Undefeated	Jul 6, 2018	Featherweight	(Canada) Brad Katona	(England) Jay Cucciniello
TUF 27: Undefeated	Jul 6, 2018	Lightweight	(United States) Michael Trizano	(United States) Joe Giannetti
TUF 28: Heavy Hitters	Nov 30, 2018	Heavyweight	(Spain) Juan Espino	(United States) Justin Frazier
TUF 28: Heavy Hitters	Nov 30, 2018	Women's Featherweight	(United States) Macy Chiasson	(Sweden) Pannie Kianzad
TUF 29: Team Volkanovski vs. Team Ortega	Aug 28, 2021	Bantamweight	(United States) Ricky Turcios	(United States) Brady Hiestand
TUF 29: Team Volkanovski vs. Team Ortega	Aug 28, 2021	Middleweight	(United States) Bryan Battle	(United States) Gilbert Urbina
TUF 30: Team Peña vs. Team Nunes	Aug 6, 2022	Heavyweight	(Nigeria) Mohammed Usman	(United States) Zac Pauga
TUF 30: Team Peña vs. Team Nunes	Aug 6, 2022	Women's Flyweight	(United States) Juliana Miller	(United States) Brogan Walker-Sanchez
TUF 31: Team McGregor vs. Team Chandler	Aug 19, 2023	Bantamweight	(Canada) Brad Katona (2)	(United States) Cody Gibson
TUF 31: Team McGregor vs. Team Chandler	Aug 19, 2023	Lightweight	(United States) Kurt Holobaugh	(United States) Austin Hubbard
TUF 32: Team Grasso vs. Team Shevchenko	Aug 24, 2024	Featherweight	(Brazil) Mairon Santos	(Australia) Kaan Ofli
TUF 32: Team Grasso vs. Team Shevchenko	Aug 24, 2024	Middleweight	(United States) Ryan Loder	(Switzerland) Robert Valentin
TUF 33: Team Cormier vs. Team Sonnen	Aug 16, 2025	Flyweight	(United States) Joseph Morales	(Kazakhstan) Alibi Idiris
TUF 33: Team Cormier vs. Team Sonnen	Sep 13, 2025	Welterweight	(Ukraine) Daniil Donchenko	(Brazil) Rodrigo Sezinando
TUF 34: Team Cormier vs. Team Bisping	Sep 26, 2026	Bantamweight	(Kyrgyzstan) Ilimbek Akylbek uulu	(Azerbaijan) Mehemmedeli Osmanli
TUF 34: Team Cormier vs. Team Bisping	Sep 26, 2026	Women's Strawweight	(Brazil) Valesca Machado	(United States) Melissa Amaya

== Championship wins by nationality ==
The table is divided by number of division championships, tournament championships, total championships, and individual champions. Fighters with multiple championship wins have each championship counted for the total. There is a distinction between the total number of championships won by a nationality and the number of individual fighters that won them. Division championships are the primary separation criteria due to being non-closed competition. It includes title holders and interim title holders. Countries that are tied are separated by number of individual champions. Interim champions who become undisputed champions are listed only once. Tournament championships are secondary due to many tournaments being country-specific and thus not generally a national achievement to win. TUF winners are not included.

Country	Division championships	Tournament championships	Total championships	Individual champions
United States	85	17	102	73
Brazil	27	6	33	24
Russia	7	1	8	5
Mexico	4	-	4	3
Australia	4	-	4	3
Canada	4	-	4	2
England	3	-	3	3
(Georgia (country)) Georgia	3	-	3	2
Nigeria	3	-	3	2
Netherlands	2	-	2	2
Poland	2	-	2	2
China	2	-	2	1
(Republic of Ireland) Ireland	2	-	2	1
Kyrgyzstan	2	-	2	1
France	2	-	2	1
Belarus	1	-	1	1
Cameroon	1	-	1	1
Czech Republic	1	-	1	1
South Africa	1	-	1	1
United Arab Emirates	1	-	1	1
Myanmar	1	-	1	1
New Zealand	1	-	1	1
Japan	0	2	2	2

== TUF winners by nationality ==
Country	TUF winners
United States	36
Brazil	9
Mexico	5
Canada	4
England	3
China	2
Nigeria	2
Australia	1
Jamaica	1
Kyrgyzstan	1
Northern Ireland	1
Peru	1
Spain	1
Ukraine	1

== Most wins in title bouts ==
Fighters with four or more championship and/or interim championship title wins. Fighters with the same number of title wins are arranged in order of most title fights. Tournament championships and TUF winners are not included.

Title wins	Champion	Division	Win	Loss	Draw	No-Contest
16	(United States) Jon Jones	Heavyweight; Light Heavyweight	2; 14	0; 0		0; 1
13	(Canada) Georges St-Pierre	Middleweight; Welterweight	1; 12	0; 2		
12	(United States) Demetrious Johnson	Bantamweight; Flyweight	0; 12	1; 1		
11	(Brazil) Anderson Silva	Middleweight	11	2		
11	(Brazil) Amanda Nunes	Women's Featherweight; Women's Bantamweight	3; 8	0; 2		
11	(Kyrgyzstan) Valentina Shevchenko	Women's Bantamweight; Women's Flyweight	0; 11	1; 1	0; 1	
9	(United States) Randy Couture	Heavyweight; Light Heavyweight	6; 3	3; 3		
9	(United States) Matt Hughes	Welterweight	9	3		
9	(Australia) Alexander Volkanovski	Lightweight; Featherweight	0; 9	2; 1		
8	(Brazil) José Aldo	Featherweight; Bantamweight	8; 0	3; 1		
8	(Nigeria) Israel Adesanya	Light Heavyweight; Middleweight	0; 8	1; 3		
7	(Russia) Islam Makhachev	Welterweight; Lightweight	2; 5	0; 0		
6	(Poland) Joanna Jędrzejczyk	Women's Flyweight; Women's Strawweight	0; 6	1; 3		
6	(United States) Daniel Cormier	Heavyweight; Light Heavyweight	2; 4	2; 1		0; 1
6	(United States) Tito Ortiz	Light Heavyweight	6	3		
6	(United States) Stipe Miocic	Heavyweight	6	3		
6	(China) Zhang Weili	Women's Flyweight; Women's Strawweight	0; 6	1; 2		
6	(Brazil) Alex Pereira	Heavyweight; Light Heavyweight; Middleweight	0; 5; 1	1; 1; 1		
6	(United States) Ronda Rousey	Women's Bantamweight	6	2		
6	(Nigeria) Kamaru Usman	Welterweight	6	2		
5	(United States) B.J. Penn	Welterweight; Lightweight	1; 4	2; 3	0; 1	
5	(United States) Max Holloway	Lightweight; Featherweight	0; 5	1; 4		
5	(United States) Tim Sylvia	Heavyweight	5	4		
5	(United States) T.J. Dillashaw	Bantamweight; Flyweight	5; 0	2; 1		
5	(United States) Chuck Liddell	Light Heavyweight	5	2		
5	(United States) Dominick Cruz	Bantamweight	5	2		
5	(Brazil) Alexandre Pantoja	Flyweight	5	2		
5	(United States) Pat Miletich	Welterweight	5	1		
5	(United States) Frank Shamrock	Light Heavyweight	5	0		
4	(United States) Rose Namajunas	Women's Strawweight	4	3		
4	(United States) Cain Velasquez	Heavyweight	4	2		
4	(Brazil) Renan Barão	Bantamweight	4	2		
4	(United States) Tyron Woodley	Welterweight	4	1	1	
4	(United States) Henry Cejudo	Bantamweight; Flyweight	2; 2	1; 1		
4	(Georgia (country)) Merab Dvalishvili	Bantamweight	4	2		
4	(Russia) Petr Yan	Bantamweight	4	2		
4	(United States) Benson Henderson	Lightweight	4	1		
4	(United States) Chris Weidman	Middleweight	4	1		
4	(United States) Aljamain Sterling	Bantamweight	4	1		
4	(Russia) Khabib Nurmagomedov	Lightweight	4	0		

== Most consecutive title defenses ==
The following includes all UFC champions who were able to consecutively defend their title three times or more. Fighters with the same number of title defenses are listed chronologically.

Defenses	Champion	Division	Period
11	(United States) Demetrious Johnson	Flyweight	Sep 22, 2012 — Aug 4, 2018
10	(Brazil) Anderson Silva	Middleweight	Oct 14, 2006 — Jul 6, 2013
9	(Canada) Georges St-Pierre	Welterweight	Apr 19, 2008 — Dec 13, 2013
8	(United States) Jon Jones	Light Heavyweight	Mar 19, 2011 — Apr 28, 2015
7	(Brazil) José Aldo	Featherweight	Nov 20, 2010 — Dec 12, 2015
7	(Kyrgyzstan) Valentina Shevchenko	Women's Flyweight	Dec 8, 2018 — Mar 4, 2023
6	(United States) Ronda Rousey	Women's Bantamweight	Dec 6, 2012 — Nov 15, 2015
5	(United States) Tito Ortiz	Light Heavyweight	Apr 14, 2000 — Sep 26, 2003
5	(United States) Matt Hughes	Welterweight	Nov 2, 2001 — Jan 31, 2004
5	(Poland) Joanna Jędrzejczyk	Women's Strawweight	Mar 14, 2015 — Nov 4, 2017
5	(Brazil) Amanda Nunes	Women's Bantamweight	Jul 9, 2016 — Dec 11, 2021
5	(Nigeria) Kamaru Usman	Welterweight	Mar 2, 2019 — Aug 20, 2022
5	(Nigeria) Israel Adesanya	Middleweight	Oct 6, 2019 — Nov 12, 2022
5	(Australia) Alexander Volkanovski	Featherweight	Dec 14, 2019 — Feb 17, 2024
4	(United States) Frank Shamrock	Light Heavyweight	Dec 21, 1997 — Nov 24, 1999
4	(United States) Pat Miletich	Welterweight	Oct 16, 1998 — May 4, 2001
4	(United States) Chuck Liddell	Light Heavyweight	Apr 16, 2005 — May 26, 2007
4	(United States) Tyron Woodley (Note: Woodley successfully defended the UFC Welterweight Championship three times and retained the title once following a draw against Stephen Thompson at UFC 205.)	Welterweight	Jul 30, 2016 — Mar 2, 2019
4	(Russia) Islam Makhachev	Lightweight	Oct 22, 2022 — Jun 28, 2025
4	(Brazil) Alexandre Pantoja	Flyweight	Jul 8, 2023 — Dec 6, 2025
3	(United States) B.J. Penn	Lightweight	Jan 19, 2008 — Apr 10, 2010
3	(United States) Frankie Edgar (Note: Edgar successfully defended the UFC Lightweight Championship twice and retained the title once following a draw against Gray Maynard at UFC 125.)	Lightweight	Apr 10, 2010 — Feb 26, 2012
3	(United States) Benson Henderson	Lightweight	Feb 26, 2012 — Aug 31, 2013
3	(Brazil) Renan Barão (Note: Barão successfully defended the interim UFC Bantamweight Championship twice before being promoted to undisputed champion and defending his title once more.)	Bantamweight	Jul 21, 2012 — May 24, 2014
3	(United States) Chris Weidman	Middleweight	Jul 6, 2013 — Dec 12, 2015
3	(United States) Daniel Cormier (Note: Cormier lost to Jon Jones attempting his 3rd consecutive defense. However, Jones' win was later overturned to a no-contest due to a failed pre-fight drug test. Cormier was later reinstated as champion and made his 3rd successful title defense at UFC 220.)	Light Heavyweight	May 23, 2015 — Dec 28, 2018
3	(United States) Stipe Miocic	Heavyweight	May 14, 2016 — Jul 7, 2018
3	(United States) Max Holloway	Featherweight	Jun 3, 2017 — Dec 14, 2019
3	(United States) Jon Jones	Light Heavyweight	Dec 29, 2018 — Aug 17, 2020
3	(Russia) Khabib Nurmagomedov	Lightweight	Apr 7, 2018 — Mar 19, 2021
3	(United States) Aljamain Sterling	Bantamweight	Mar 6, 2021 — Aug 19, 2023
3	(Brazil) Alex Pereira	Light Heavyweight	Nov 11, 2023 — Mar 8, 2025
3	(China) Zhang Weili	Women's Strawweight	Nov 12, 2022 — Oct 25, 2025
3	(Georgia (country)) Merab Dvalishvili	Bantamweight	Sep 14, 2024 — Dec 6, 2025

- **Bold** — Incumbent champion.

== Longest reigning champions ==
The following is a list of the ten longest reigning UFC champions.

=== Longest individual reigns ===
	Name	Title Reign	Weight class	Successful defenses
1	(Brazil) Anderson Silva	2,457 days	MW	10
2	(United States) Demetrious Johnson	2,142 days	FLW	11
3	(Canada) Georges St-Pierre	2,064 days	WW	9
4	(Brazil) Amanda Nunes	1,981 days	W-BW	5
5	(Brazil) José Aldo	1,848 days	FTW	7
6	(Brazil) Amanda Nunes	1,634 days	W-FTW	2
7	(Kyrgyzstan) Valentina Shevchenko	1,547 days	W-FLW	7
8	(Australia) Alexander Volkanovski	1,526 days	FTW	5
9	(United States) Jon Jones	1,501 days	LHW	8
10	(United States) Daniel Cormier	1,315 days	LHW	3

=== Longest combined reigns ===
	Name	Days as champion	Reigns	Weight class	Cumulative title defenses
1	(Brazil) Amanda Nunes	3,940 days	3	W-BW, W-FTW	8
2	(United States) Jon Jones	2,938 days	3	LHW, HW	12
3	(Brazil) Anderson Silva	2,457 days	1	MW	10
4	(Kyrgyzstan) Valentina Shevchenko	2,296 days	2	W-FLW	9
5	(Canada) Georges St-Pierre	2,237 days	3	WW, MW	9
6	(United States) Demetrious Johnson	2,142 days	1	FLW	11
7	(Australia) **Alexander Volkanovski**	2,109 days	2	FTW	7
8	(Brazil) José Aldo	2,037 days	2	FTW	7
9	(United States) Daniel Cormier	1,722 days	2	LHW, HW	4
10	(China) Zhang Weili	1,681 days	2	W-SW	4

- **Bold** — Incumbent champion.

== Multi-division champions ==
Fighters who have won championships in multiple weight classes. Tournament championships and TUF winners are not included.

Randy Couture is notably the first champion to hold belts in two different divisions, and one of the few to reclaim a title after being defeated. Conor McGregor was the first fighter to hold multiple titles simultaneously.

Interim

	Champion	Division	Won	Lost	Defenses	Reign	Total reign
1	(United States) Randy Couture	Heavyweight	Dec 21, 1997 (UFC Japan)	Jan ?, 1998 (stripped)	0	? days	1,478 + ? days
1	(United States) Randy Couture	Heavyweight	Nov 17, 2000 (UFC 28)	Mar 22, 2002 (UFC 36)	2	490 days	1,478 + ? days
1	(United States) Randy Couture	Heavyweight	Mar 3, 2007 (UFC 68)	Nov 15, 2008 (UFC 91)	1	623 days	1,478 + ? days
1	(United States) Randy Couture	Light Heavyweight	Jun 6, 2003 (UFC 43)	Sep 26, 2003 (UFC 44)	0	-	1,478 + ? days
1	(United States) Randy Couture	Light Heavyweight	Sep 26, 2003 (UFC 44)	Jan 31, 2004 (UFC 46)	0	127 days	1,478 + ? days
1	(United States) Randy Couture	Light Heavyweight	Aug 21, 2004 (UFC 49)	Apr 16, 2005 (UFC 52)	0	238 days	1,478 + ? days
2	(United States) B.J. Penn	Welterweight	Jan 31, 2004 (UFC 46)	May 17, 2004 (stripped)	0	107 days	919 days
2	(United States) B.J. Penn	Lightweight	Jan 19, 2008 (UFC 80)	Apr 10, 2010 (UFC 112)	3	812 days	919 days
3	(Republic of Ireland) Conor McGregor	Featherweight	Jul 11, 2015 (UFC 189)	Dec 12, 2015 (UFC 194)	0	-	861 days
3	(Republic of Ireland) Conor McGregor	Featherweight	Dec 12, 2015 (UFC 194)	Nov 26, 2016 (stripped)	0	350 days	861 days
3	(Republic of Ireland) Conor McGregor	Lightweight	Nov 12, 2016 (UFC 205)	Apr 7, 2018 (stripped)	0	511 days	861 days
4	(Canada) Georges St-Pierre	Welterweight	Nov 18, 2006 (UFC 65)	Apr 7, 2007 (UFC 69)	0	140 days	2,237 days
4	(Canada) Georges St-Pierre	Welterweight	Dec 29, 2007 (UFC 79)	Apr 19, 2008 (UFC 83)	0	-	2,237 days
4	(Canada) Georges St-Pierre	Welterweight	Apr 19, 2008 (UFC 83)	Dec 13, 2013 (vacated)	9	2,064 days	2,237 days
4	(Canada) Georges St-Pierre	Middleweight	Nov 4, 2017 (UFC 217)	Dec 7, 2017 (vacated)	0	33 days	2,237 days
5	(United States) Daniel Cormier	Light Heavyweight	May 23, 2015 (UFC 187)	Dec 28, 2018 (vacated)	3	1,315 days	1,722 days
5	(United States) Daniel Cormier	Heavyweight	Jul 7, 2018 (UFC 226)	Aug 17, 2019 (UFC 241)	1	407 days	1,722 days
6	(Brazil) Amanda Nunes	Women's Bantamweight	Jul 9, 2016 (UFC 200)	Dec 11, 2021 (UFC 269)	5	1,981 days	3,940 days
6	(Brazil) Amanda Nunes	Women's Bantamweight	Jul 30, 2022 (UFC 277)	Jun 20, 2023 (vacated)	1	325 days	3,940 days
6	(Brazil) Amanda Nunes	Women's Featherweight	Dec 29, 2018 (UFC 232)	Jun 20, 2023 (vacated)	2	1,634 days	3,940 days
7	(United States) Henry Cejudo	Flyweight	Aug 4, 2018 (UFC 227)	Feb 29, 2020 (vacated)	1	574 days	926 days
7	(United States) Henry Cejudo	Bantamweight	Jun 8, 2019 (UFC 238)	May 24, 2020 (vacated)	1	352 days	926 days
8	(United States) Jon Jones	Light Heavyweight	Mar 19, 2011 (UFC 128)	Apr 28, 2015 (stripped)	8	1,501 days	2,938 days
8	(United States) Jon Jones	Light Heavyweight	Apr 23, 2016 (UFC 197)	Nov 19, 2016 (stripped)	0	-	2,938 days
8	(United States) Jon Jones	Light Heavyweight	Dec 29, 2018 (UFC 232)	Aug 17, 2020 (vacated)	3	597 days	2,938 days
8	(United States) Jon Jones	Heavyweight	Mar 4, 2023 (UFC 285)	Jun 21, 2025 (vacated)	1	840 days	2,938 days
9	(Brazil) Alex Pereira	Middleweight	Nov 12, 2022 (UFC 281)	Apr 8, 2023 (UFC 287)	0	147 days	819 days
9	(Brazil) Alex Pereira	Light Heavyweight	Nov 11, 2023 (UFC 295)	Mar 8, 2025 (UFC 313)	3	483 days	819 days
9	(Brazil) Alex Pereira	Light Heavyweight	Oct 4, 2025 (UFC 320)	Apr 11, 2026 (vacated)	0	189 days	819 days
10	(Georgia (country)) Ilia Topuria	Featherweight	Feb 17, 2024 (UFC 298)	Apr 12, 2025 (vacated)	1	419 days	770 days
10	(Georgia (country)) Ilia Topuria	Lightweight	Jun 28, 2025 (UFC 317)	Jun 14, 2026 (UFC Freedom 250)	0	351 days	770 days
11	(Russia) **Islam Makhachev**	Lightweight	Oct 22, 2022 (UFC 280)	Jun 28, 2025 (vacated)	4	980 days	1,346 days
11	(Russia) **Islam Makhachev**	Welterweight	Nov 15, 2025 (UFC 322)	Incumbent	1	366 days	1,346 days

=== Simultaneous two division champions ===
- Note: Defenses shown are while champion was a two division champion.

	Champion	Division	Period	Defenses	Reign
1	(Republic of Ireland) Conor McGregor	Featherweight	Nov 12, 2016 – Nov 26, 2016	0	14 days
1	(Republic of Ireland) Conor McGregor	Lightweight	Nov 12, 2016 – Nov 26, 2016	0	14 days
2	(United States) Daniel Cormier	Light Heavyweight	Jul 7, 2018 – Dec 28, 2018	0	174 days
2	(United States) Daniel Cormier	Heavyweight	Jul 7, 2018 – Dec 28, 2018	1	174 days
3	(Brazil) Amanda Nunes	Women's Bantamweight	Dec 29, 2018 – Dec 11, 2021	2	1,078 days
3	(Brazil) Amanda Nunes	Women's Featherweight	Dec 29, 2018 – Dec 11, 2021	2	1,078 days
4	(United States) Henry Cejudo	Flyweight	Jun 8, 2019 – Feb 29, 2020	0	266 days
4	(United States) Henry Cejudo	Bantamweight	Jun 8, 2019 – Feb 29, 2020	0	266 days
5	(Brazil) Amanda Nunes (2)	Women's Featherweight	Jul 30, 2022 – Jun 20, 2023	0	325 days
5	(Brazil) Amanda Nunes (2)	Women's Bantamweight	Jul 30, 2022 – Jun 20, 2023	1	325 days

- **Bold** - Active reigns.

== Missed weight title fights ==
There have been multiple instances in UFC history where a fighter misses the required weight limit for a championship fight. The following fights were originally scheduled and advertised as title fights, with the contenders earning a title shot, but due to a fighter missing weight these fights took place, only one fighter was eligible for the title, or the fight was changed to a non-title fight.

Event	Date	Championship	Result			Notes
UFC 56	Nov 19, 2005	Welterweight	Matt Hughes (c) (170 lb)	def.	Joe Riggs (172.5 lb)	Fight changed to non-title contest
UFC 67	Feb 3, 2007	Middleweight	Anderson Silva (c) (185 lb)	def.	Travis Lutter (187 lb)	Fight changed to non-title contest
UFC 206	Dec 10, 2016	Interim Featherweight	Max Holloway (145 lb)	def.	Anthony Pettis (148 lb)	Only Holloway was eligible to win title
UFC 221	Feb 11, 2018	Interim Middleweight	Yoel Romero (187.7 lb)	def.	Luke Rockhold (185 lb)	Only Rockhold was eligible to win title
UFC 225	Jun 9, 2018	Middleweight	Robert Whittaker (c) (185 lb)	def.	Yoel Romero (185.2 lb)	Fight changed to non-title contest
UFC Fight Night: Benavidez vs. Figueiredo	Feb 29, 2020	Flyweight	Deiveson Figueiredo (127.5 lb)	def.	Joseph Benavidez (124.5 lb)	Only Benavidez was eligible to win title
UFC 274	May 7, 2022	Lightweight	Charles Oliveira ~~(c)~~ (155.5 lb)	def.	Justin Gaethje (155 lb)	Oliveira was stripped of the title, only Gaethje was eligible to win title

== See also ==
- List of current mixed martial arts champions
- List of current UFC fighters
- List of Pride Fighting Championships champions
- List of Strikeforce champions
- List of UFC events
- List of UFC records
- List of World Extreme Cagefighting champions
- Mixed martial arts weight classes
