= UFC 329 =

2026 mixed martial arts event

UFC 329: McGregor vs. Holloway 2
- The poster for UFC 329: McGregor vs. Holloway 2
- Promotion: Ultimate Fighting Championship
- Date: July 11, 2026
- Venue: T-Mobile Arena
- City: Paradise, Nevada, United States
- Attendance: 20,078
- Total gate: $26,430,566

Event chronology
UFC Fight Night: Fiziev vs. Torres	UFC 329: McGregor vs. Holloway 2	UFC Fight Night: du Plessis vs. Usman

UFC 329: McGregor vs. Holloway 2 was a mixed martial arts event produced by the Ultimate Fighting Championship that took place on July 11, 2026, at the T-Mobile Arena in Paradise, Nevada, part of the Las Vegas Valley, United States.

== Background ==
The event was held during the UFC's annual International Fight Week, with the 2026 UFC Hall of Fame induction ceremony taking place on July 9, 2026.

A welterweight bout between former UFC Featherweight and Lightweight Champion Conor McGregor and fellow former featherweight champion Max Holloway headlined the event. This was McGregor's first appearance since he broke his leg at UFC 264 in July 2021, and it also marked Holloway's debut in the welterweight division. They previously fought in August 2013 at UFC Fight Night: Shogun vs. Sonnen in a featherweight bout early in their UFC careers, where McGregor won via unanimous decision. Maurício Ruffy served as backup and potential replacement for this fight.

A welterweight bout between former UFC Welterweight Champion Leon Edwards and Daniel Rodriguez was reportedly linked to the event. However, Rodriguez was instead scheduled to face another opponent at another date.

A bantamweight bout between Farid Basharat and Ethyn Ewing was scheduled for the event. The bout was originally booked for UFC Fight Night: Kape vs. Horiguchi three weeks prior, but was moved to this event for undisclosed reasons. However, Ewing had to withdraw for undisclosed reasons and was replaced by promotional newcomer John Garza.

A flyweight bout between Cody Durden and Ode' Osbourne was scheduled for the event. However, Osbourne had to withdraw due to an undisclosed injury and was replaced by Alessandro Costa.

== Results ==
Main card (Paramount+ / CBS)
Weight class				Method	Round	Time	Notes
Welterweight	Max Holloway	def.	Conor McGregor	TKO (knee injury)	1	1:09
Lightweight	Paddy Pimblett	def.	Benoît Saint Denis	Technical Submission (Peruvian necktie)	1	0:52
Bantamweight	Mario Bautista	def.	Cory Sandhagen	Decision (unanimous) (29–28, 29–28, 29–28)	3	5:00
Flyweight	Brandon Royval	def.	Lone'er Kavanagh	Submission (rear-naked choke)	3	3:40
Lightweight	King Green	def.	Terrance McKinney	TKO (punches)	1	4:59
Preliminary card (Paramount+ / CBS)
Light Heavyweight	Robert Whittaker	def.	Nikita Krylov	TKO (jaw injury)	3	1:01
Heavyweight	Gable Steveson	def.	Elisha Ellison	KO (knees and punches)	1	2:31
Bantamweight	Adrian Yañez	def.	Cody Garbrandt	TKO (punches)	1	2:47
Featherweight	Luke Riley	def.	Kai Kamaka III	TKO (knees and punches)	1	3:03
Early preliminary card (Paramount+)
Women's Flyweight	Wang Cong	def.	Tracy Cortez	Decision (unanimous) (29–27, 29–27, 29–27)	3	5:00	(Note: Wang was deducted one point in round 2 due to an illegal knee to a grounded opponent.)
Middleweight	Damian Pinas	def.	César Almeida	KO (punch)	1	4:44
Bantamweight	Farid Basharat	def.	John Garza	Decision (unanimous) (30–27, 30–27, 29–28)	3	5:00
Middleweight	Ryan Gandra	def.	Zachary Reese	TKO (punches)	1	1:15
Flyweight	Alessandro Costa	def.	Cody Durden	Submission (rear-naked choke)	2	2:19

== Bonus awards ==
The following fighters received bonuses: $100,000. The other finishes received $25,000 additional bonuses.

- Fight of the Night: Brandon Royval vs. Lone'er Kavanagh
- Performance of the Night: Paddy Pimblett and King Green

== Records set ==
The event matched the UFC record for the most finishes in a single event, tying UFC Fight Night: Rockhold vs. Bisping, UFC 224, UFC 281 and UFC Fight Night: Imavov vs. Borralho with a total of 11 finishes. The record was ultimately surpassed in August 2026 when UFC Fight Night: Medić vs. Rodriguez recorded twelve finishes.

The event also set the record for the most first-round finishes in a modern UFC event, with eight, a mark that was later surpassed one month later when UFC Fight Night: Medić vs. Rodriguez recorded nine.

The event generated $26,430,566 in ticket receipts, which broke the record for the biggest gate in UFC history surpassing UFC 306 in September 2024 (which previously held the record with a gate of $21,829,245).

== See also ==
- 2026 in UFC
- List of current UFC fighters
- List of UFC events
