= UFC Fight Night: Almeida vs. Lewis =

2023 mixed martial arts event in São Paulo

- The poster for UFC Fight Night: Almeida vs. Lewis
- Promotion: Ultimate Fighting Championship
- Date: November 4, 2023
- Venue: Ginásio do Ibirapuera
- City: São Paulo, Brazil
- Attendance: 10,792

Event chronology
UFC 294: Makhachev vs. Volkanovski 2	UFC Fight Night: Almeida vs. Lewis	UFC 295: Procházka vs. Pereira

UFC Fight Night: Almeida vs. Lewis (also known as UFC Fight Night 231 and UFC on ESPN+ 89) was a mixed martial arts event produced by the Ultimate Fighting Championship that took place on November 4, 2023, at Ginásio do Ibirapuera in São Paulo, Brazil.

== Background ==
The event marked the promotion's ninth visit to São Paulo and first since UFC Fight Night: Błachowicz vs. Jacaré in November 2019.

The event was expected to be headlined by a heavyweight bout between Curtis Blaydes and Jailton Almeida. However, Blaydes withdrew for unknown reasons and was replaced by former UFC Heavyweight Championship challenger Derrick Lewis.

A women's strawweight bout between Eduarda Moura and Kim So-yul was scheduled for the event. However, Kim was removed from the event for undisclosed reasons and replaced by Montserrat Ruiz. At the weigh-ins, Moura weighed in at 119.5 pounds, three and a half pounds over the strawweight non-title fight limit. The bout proceeded at catchweight and she was fined 30% of her purse which went to Ruiz.

A middleweight bout between Caio Borralho and Nursulton Ruziboev was expected to take place at the event. However, Ruziboev withdrew for unknown reasons and was replaced by Abusupiyan Magomedov.

A bantamweight bout between Daniel Santos and Daniel Marcos was expected to take place at the event. However, Santos pulled out due to undisclosed reasons and was replaced by promotional newcomer Victor Hugo. However, the bout was scrapped after Hugo weighed in at 138.5 pounds, two and a half pounds over the bantamweight non-title fight limit.

A featherweight bout between Lucas Alexander and David Onama was scheduled to take place in the preliminary card. However, the bout was cancelled after Onama suffered an injury.

At the weigh-ins, Ismael Bonfim weighed in at 159.5 pounds, three and a half pounds over the lightweight non-title fight limit. As a result, his scheduled bout with Vinc Pichel was scrapped.

A middleweight bout between Rodolfo Vieira and Armen Petrosyan was scheduled to take place on the main card, but it was scrapped after Petrosyan became ill backstage during the event.

A lightweight bout between Esteban Ribovics and Elves Brener was scheduled for the event. However, Ribovics withdrew due to an accident and was replaced by promotional newcomer Kaynan Kruschewsky.

== Results ==
Main card (ESPN+)
Weight class				Method	Round	Time	Notes
Heavyweight	Jailton Almeida	def.	Derrick Lewis	Decision (unanimous) (50–44, 50–44, 50–45)	5	5:00
Welterweight	Nicolas Dalby	def.	Gabriel Bonfim	TKO (knees and punches)	2	4:33
Heavyweight	Rodrigo Nascimento	def.	Don'Tale Mayes	Decision (unanimous) (30–27, 29–28, 29–28)	3	5:00
Middleweight	Caio Borralho	def.	Abusupiyan Magomedov	Decision (unanimous) (30–27, 29–28, 29–28)	3	5:00
Catchweight (165 lb)	Elves Brener	def.	Kaynan Kruschewsky	KO (punch)	1	4:01
Preliminary card (ESPN+)
Welterweight	Rinat Fakhretdinov	vs.	Elizeu Zaleski dos Santos	Draw (majority) (29–28, 28–28, 28–28)	3	5:00
Light Heavyweight	Vitor Petrino	def.	Modestas Bukauskas	KO (punch)	2	1:03
Women's Strawweight	Angela Hill	def.	Denise Gomes	Decision (unanimous) (30–27, 29–28, 29–28)	3	5:00
Catchweight (119.5 lb)	Eduarda Moura	def.	Montserrat Ruiz	TKO (punches)	2	2:14
Lightweight	Marc Diakiese	def.	Kauê Fernandes	Decision (split) (29–28, 28–29, 30–27)	3	5:00

== Bonus awards ==
The following fighters received $50,000 bonuses.

- Fight of the Night: Nicolas Dalby vs. Gabriel Bonfim
- Performance of the Night: Elves Brener and Vitor Petrino

== See also ==
- List of UFC events
- List of current UFC fighters
- 2023 in UFC
