= Rinat Fakhretdinov =

Russian mixed martial artist (born 1991)

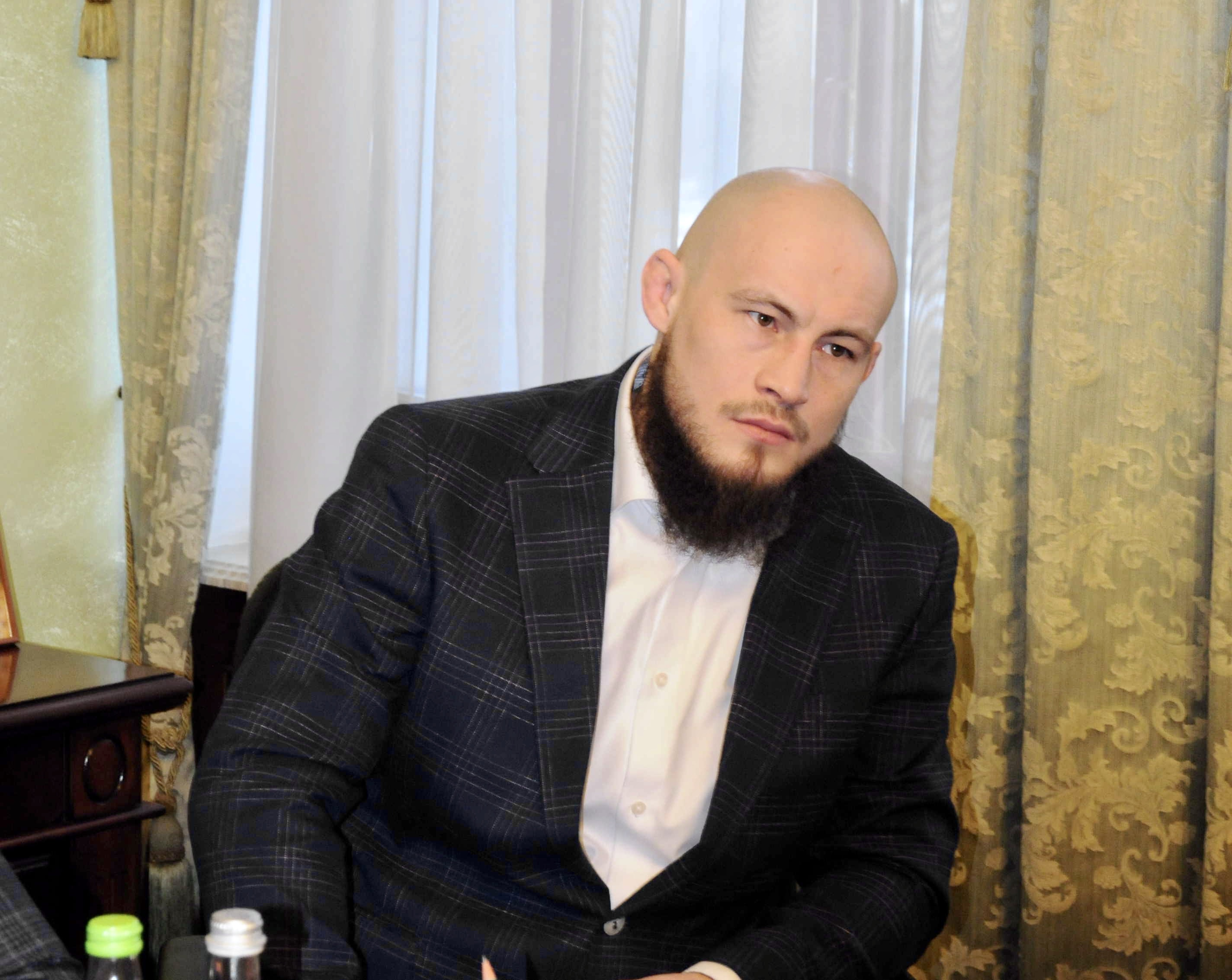
- Born: Rinat Ryashitovich Fakhretdinov; 28 September 1991 (age 35); Belozerye, Mordovian ASSR, Russian SFSR, Soviet Union
- Native name: Ринат Фахретдинов
- Nickname: Gladiator
- Nationality: Russian
- Height: 6 ft 0 in (183 cm)
- Weight: 171 lb (78 kg; 12 st 3 lb)
- Division: Welterweight (2022—present); Middleweight (2013—2021)
- Reach: 74 in (188 cm)
- Style: Combat Sambo
- Stance: Orthodox
- Fighting out of: Saransk, Mordovia, Russia
- Team: American Top Team; Evolve Gym; Gold Star Fit
- Trainer: Marat Kapkaev; Marcos DaMatta
- Rank: Master of Sport in Combat Sambo
- Years active: 2013–present

Mixed martial arts record
- Total: 26
- Wins: 24
- By knockout: 12
- By submission: 6
- By decision: 6
- Losses: 1
- By decision: 1
- Draws: 1

Other information
- Mixed martial arts record from Sherdog

Rinat Ryashitovich Fakhretdinov (Note: Russian: Ринат Ряшитович Фахретдинов Tatar: Ринат Рәшит улы Фәхретдинов) (born 28 September 1991) is a Russian professional mixed martial artist. He competed in the Welterweight division of the Ultimate Fighting Championship (UFC).

== Early life ==
Rinat Ryashitovich Fakhretdinov was born into a Volga Tatar family on 28 September 1991, in the village of Belozerye in the Romodanovsky District of the Mordovian ASSR, an autonomous republic within the Russian SFSR, Soviet Union. He started freestyle wrestling and Kūdō at the age of 13. In 2011, he moved from Saransk, Mordovia to Moscow and jointed the "sparta combat sambo club". To support himself, he held multiple jobs while studying law at Mordovia State University through correspondence.

== Mixed martial arts career ==
In his early 20s, he transitioned to mixed martial arts (MMA), participating in amateur tournaments and gaining experience. He secured the SFC championship and later received an invitation to compete in the GFC, a prominent MMA league in Russia. On 3 May 2019 he became the Gorilla Fighting Championship champion in middleweight division after a submission win over Alberto Pereira.

At the UAE Warriors 15 tournament, his knockout victory over Eric Spicely caught the attention of UFC president Dana White, who offered him a contract to join the UFC. This made Fakhretdinov the first Tatar fighter to compete in a Western MMA promotion.

=== Ultimate Fighting Championship ===
Fakhretdinov made his UFC debut on June 4, 2022, at UFC Fight Night 207 in a welterweight bout against Andreas Michailidis. He won the fight via unanimous decision.

Fakhretdinov was expected to face Michael Morales on December 17, 2022, at UFC Fight Night 216. However, Morales pulled out and was replaced by Bryan Battle. Fakhretdinov won the one-sided fight by unanimous decision.

Fakhretdinov faced Kevin Lee on July 1, 2023, at UFC on ESPN 48. He won the fight via technical submission due to a guillotine choke with in the opening minute.

Fakhretdinov faced Elizeu Zaleski dos Santos on November 4, 2023, at UFC Fight Night 231. The bout ended in a majority draw.

Fakhretdinov faced Nicolas Dalby on June 22, 2024, at UFC on ABC 6. He won the fight by split decision.

Fakhretdinov was scheduled to face Nursulton Ruziboev on October 26, 2024 at UFC 308. However, Ruziboev withdrew from the fight due to an injury and was replaced by former LFA Welterweight Champion and promotional newcomer Carlos Leal. He won the bout by unanimous decision, despite 16 of 16 media outlets scoring the bout for Leal.

Fakhretdinov was scheduled to face former LFA Welterweight Champion Gabriel Bonfim on February 15, 2025 at UFC Fight Night 251. However, Fakhretdinov withdrew from the fight due to an undisclosed injury and was replaced by Khaos Williams.

Fakhretdinov faced Andreas Gustafsson on September 6, 2025 at UFC Fight Night 258. He won the fight by technical knockout one minute into the first round.

On December 22, 2025, it was reported that Fakhretdinov parted ways with the UFC after completed his fight contract and was not re-signed by the promotion.

== Professional grappling career ==
Fakhretdinov competed against Douglas Lima at ADXC 2 on January 19, 2024. He won the match by unanimous decision.

Fakhretdinov competed against Craig Jones at Pit Submission Series 4 on April 20, 2024. He lost the match by submission due to a triangle choke.

== Championships and accomplishments ==
=== Mixed martial arts ===
- Ultimate Fighting Championship
  - UFC.com Awards
    - 2023: Ranked #9 Submission of the Year vs. Kevin Lee
- Eagle Fighting Championship (Then Gorilla Fighting Championship)
  - GFC Middleweight Championship (One time)
    - One successful title defence

=== Combat sambo ===
- Russian combat sambo championships — 2nd
- Moscow combat sambo championships — 1st

== Mixed martial arts record ==
Professional record breakdown
| 26 matches | 24 wins | 1 loss |
| By knockout | 12 | 0 |
| By submission | 6 | 0 |
| By decision | 6 | 1 |
| Draws | 1 | |

| Res. | Record | Opponent | Method | Event | Date | Round | Time | Location | Notes |
|---|---|---|---|---|---|---|---|---|---|
| Win | 24–1–1 | Andreas Gustafsson | TKO (punches) | UFC Fight Night: Imavov vs. Borralho | September 6, 2025 | 1 | 0:54 | Paris, France | |
| Win | 23–1–1 | Carlos Leal | Decision (unanimous) | UFC 308 | October 26, 2024 | 3 | 5:00 | Abu Dhabi, United Arab Emirates | |
| Win | 22–1–1 | Nicolas Dalby | Decision (split) | UFC on ABC: Whittaker vs. Aliskerov | June 22, 2024 | 3 | 5:00 | Riyadh, Saudi Arabia | |
| Draw | 21–1–1 | Elizeu Zaleski dos Santos | Draw (majority) | UFC Fight Night: Almeida vs. Lewis | November 4, 2023 | 3 | 5:00 | São Paulo, Brazil | |
| Win | 21–1 | Kevin Lee | Technical Submission (guillotine choke) | UFC on ESPN: Strickland vs. Magomedov | July 1, 2023 | 1 | 0:55 | Las Vegas, Nevada, United States | |
| Win | 20–1 | Bryan Battle | Decision (unanimous) | UFC Fight Night: Cannonier vs. Strickland | December 17, 2022 | 3 | 5:00 | Las Vegas, Nevada, United States | |
| Win | 19–1 | Andreas Michailidis | Decision (unanimous) | UFC Fight Night: Volkov vs. Rozenstruik | June 4, 2022 | 3 | 5:00 | Las Vegas, Nevada, United States | Return to Welterweight. |
| Win | 18–1 | Eric Spicely | KO (punch) | UAE Warriors 15 | January 15, 2021 | 1 | 0:55 | Abu Dhabi, United Arab Emirates | |
| Win | 17–1 | Jhonny Carlos | Decision (unanimous) | Gorilla Fighting 16 | August 30, 2019 | 3 | 5:00 | Astrakhan, Russia | Defended the GFC Middleweight Championship. |
| Win | 16–1 | Alberto Uda | Submission (guillotine choke) | Gorilla Fighting 11 | May 3, 2019 | 1 | 4:13 | Penza, Russia | Won the GFC Middleweight Championship. |
| Win | 15–1 | Vladimir Migovich | TKO (punches) | Samara MMA Federation: Battle on the Volga 9 | February 17, 2019 | 1 | 1:09 | Kazan, Russia | |
| Win | 14–1 | Viktor Shabalov | Submission (guillotine choke) | Samara MMA Federation: Battle on the Volga 7 | November 4, 2018 | 2 | 3:15 | Samara, Russia | |
| Win | 13–1 | Bayram Mamedov | TKO (punches) | Samara MMA Federation: Battle on the Volga 4 | May 11, 2018 | 1 | N/A | Samara, Russia | Return to Middleweight. |
| Win | 12–1 | Kevin Oliver | TKO (punches) | Prosperity Fight Promo: Battle for Samara | February 2, 2018 | 1 | 4:13 | Samara, Russia | |
| Win | 11–1 | Nurgazy Kaldar | TKO (punches) | Russian MMA Union: Legacy of Sparta 3 | August 12, 2017 | 1 | 0:50 | Botlikhsky, Russia | Welterweight debut. |
| Win | 10–1 | Emin Agaev | KO (punches) | Russian MMA Union: Legacy of Sparta 2 | August 14, 2016 | 1 | 0:10 | Botlikhsky, Russia | |
| Win | 9–1 | Denis Gunich | Decision (unanimous) | Octagon Fighting Sensation 8 | May 8, 2015 | 3 | 5:00 | Moscow, Russia | |
| Win | 8–1 | Melis Joldoshev | Submission (guillotine choke) | World Ertaymash Federation 2 | March 15, 2015 | 2 | 2:04 | Bishkek, Kyrgyzstan | |
| Win | 7–1 | Yuri Ilyin | TKO (punches) | Russian MMA Union: Legacy of Sparta 1 | September 14, 2014 | 1 | 2:15 | Zelenograd, Russia | |
| Win | 6–1 | Erikson Betao | Submission (guillotine choke) | Fight Stars: Team Challenge 1 | September 5, 2014 | 1 | 2:05 | Saransk, Russia | |
| Win | 5–1 | Ravshan Akhmedov | TKO (corner stoppage) | No. 1 Martial Arts Club: Beginning of the Road Finals | November 30, 2013 | 2 | 4:33 | Moscow, Russia | Won the No. 1 Martial Arts Club middleweight tournament. |
| Win | 4–1 | Magomed Isaev | Submission (rear-naked choke) | No. 1 Martial Arts Club: Beginning of the Road – Semifinals | October 27, 2013 | 1 | 2:22 | Moscow, Russia | No. 1 Martial Arts Club Middleweight Tournament Semifinal. |
| Win | 3–1 | Marat Bekmuratov | TKO (punches) | No. 1 Martial Arts Club: Beginning of the Road – Quarterfinals | September 22, 2013 | 1 | 0:30 | Moscow, Russia | No. 1 Martial Arts Club Middleweight Tournament Quarterfinal. |
| Win | 2–1 | Pavel Bodrov | TKO (punches) | Razdolie Cup 2 | June 30, 2013 | 1 | 2:30 | Zelenograd, Russia | |
| Loss | 1–1 | Aigun Akhmedov | Decision (unanimous) | Warrior's Honor: Igor Vovchanchyn Cup 3 | June 5, 2013 | 2 | 5:00 | Kharkiv, Ukraine | |
| Win | 1–0 | Aleksandr Svirid | TKO (punches) | Warrior's Honor: Igor Vovchanchyn Cup 3 | June 5, 2013 | 2 | 0:41 | Kharkiv, Ukraine | Middleweight debut. |

== See also ==
- List of male mixed martial artists
