= UFC Fight Night: Imavov vs. Borralho =

Mixed martial arts event in 2025

- The poster for UFC Fight Night: Imavov vs. Borralho
- Promotion: Ultimate Fighting Championship
- Date: September 6, 2025
- Venue: Accor Arena
- City: Paris, France
- Attendance: 15,724
- Total gate: $4,331,000

Event chronology
UFC Fight Night: Walker vs. Zhang	UFC Fight Night: Imavov vs. Borralho	UFC Fight Night: Lopes vs. Silva

UFC Fight Night: Imavov vs. Borralho (also known as UFC Fight Night 258 and UFC on ESPN+ 116) was a mixed martial arts event produced by the Ultimate Fighting Championship that took place on September 6, 2025, at the Accor Arena in Paris, France.

== Background ==
The event marked the promotion's fourth consecutive annual visit to Paris and first since UFC Fight Night: Moicano vs. Saint Denis in September 2024.

A middleweight bout between Nassourdine Imavov and Caio Borralho headlined the event.

A lightweight bout between Benoît Saint Denis and Maurício Ruffy took place as the co-main event.

A women's flyweight bout between promotional newcomer Kennedy Freeman and Yuneisy Duben was scheduled for this event. However, both Duben and Freeman had to withdraw due to injury, so the bout was subsequently cancelled.

A lightweight bout between Farès Ziam and Kauê Fernandes was scheduled for this event. However, Ziam withdrew for personal reasons following the death of his grandmother and was replaced by promotional newcomer Harry Hardwick.

Former three-time Bellator Featherweight World Champion (also one-time Bellator Lightweight World Champion) Patrício Pitbull and promotional newcomer Losene Keita were expected to meet in a featherweight bout at the main card. However, at the weigh-ins, Keita weighed in at 149 pounds, three pounds over the division's non-title fight limit, resulting in the cancellation of the bout.

== Results ==
Main card (ESPN+)
Weight class				Method	Round	Time	Notes
Middleweight	Nassourdine Imavov	def.	Caio Borralho	Decision (unanimous) (50–45, 49–46, 49–46)	5	5:00
Lightweight	Benoît Saint Denis	def.	Maurício Ruffy	Submission (face crank)	2	2:56
Light Heavyweight	Modestas Bukauskas	def.	Paul Craig	KO (elbow)	1	5:00
Lightweight	Mason Jones	def.	Bolaji Oki	TKO (elbows)	2	3:18
Welterweight	Axel Sola	def.	Rhys McKee	TKO (punches)	3	2:02
Featherweight	William Gomis	def.	Robert Ruchała	Decision (unanimous) (30–27, 29–28, 29–28)	3	5:00
Preliminary card (ESPN+)
Light Heavyweight	Oumar Sy	def.	Brendson Ribeiro	TKO (elbows and punches)	1	4:42
Heavyweight	Ante Delija	def.	Marcin Tybura	KO (punches)	1	2:03
Lightweight	Kauê Fernandes	def.	Harry Hardwick	TKO (leg kicks)	1	3:21
Welterweight	Sam Patterson	def.	Trey Waters	TKO (punches)	1	3:01
Middleweight	Robert Bryczek	def.	Brad Tavares	TKO (punches)	3	1:43
Welterweight	Rinat Fakhretdinov	def.	Andreas Gustafsson	TKO (punches)	1	0:54
Women's Strawweight	Sam Hughes	def.	Shauna Bannon	Submission (rear-naked choke)	2	1:58

== Bonus awards ==
The following fighters received $50,000 bonuses.

- Fight of the Night: No bonus awarded.
- Performance of the Night: Benoît Saint Denis, Mason Jones, Ante Delija, and Kauê Fernandes

== Records set ==
The event set a new UFC record for the most knockouts in a single event, recording nine knockouts and surpassing the previous record of eight. UFC 332 later surpassed it with eleven knockouts in October 2026.

The event also matched the UFC record for the most finishes in a single event, tying UFC Fight Night: Rockhold vs. Bisping, UFC 224, UFC 281, UFC 329 and UFC 332 with a total of 11 finishes. The record was ultimately surpassed in August 2026 when UFC Fight Night: Medić vs. Rodriguez recorded twelve finishes.

== See also ==
- 2025 in UFC
- List of current UFC fighters
- List of UFC events
