= UFC on ESPN: Strickland vs. Magomedov =

2023 mixed martial arts event

- The poster for UFC on ESPN: Strickland vs. Magomedov
- Promotion: Ultimate Fighting Championship
- Date: July 1, 2023
- Venue: UFC Apex
- City: Enterprise, Nevada, United States
- Attendance: Not announced

Event chronology
UFC on ABC: Emmett vs. Topuria	UFC on ESPN: Strickland vs. Magomedov	UFC 290: Volkanovski vs. Rodríguez

UFC on ESPN: Strickland vs. Magomedov (also known as UFC on ESPN 48 and UFC Vegas 76) was a mixed martial arts event produced by the Ultimate Fighting Championship that took place on July 1, 2023, at the UFC Apex facility in Enterprise, Nevada, part of the Las Vegas Metropolitan Area, United States.

== Background ==
A middleweight bout between Sean Strickland and Abusupiyan Magomedov headlined the event.

A middleweight bout between Abdul Razak Alhassan and Brunno Ferreira was originally expected to take place at UFC Fight Night: Dern vs. Hill but was moved to this event for unknown reasons. In turn, Alhassan pulled out in late June and was replaced by promotional newcomer Nursulton Ruziboev.

Vinc Pichel and Benoît Saint Denis were scheduled to meet in a lightweight bout. However, Pichel pulled out in late-May due to injury and was replaced by Ismael Bonfim.

A flyweight bout between Clayton Carpenter and Stephen Erceg was expected to take place at this event, but it was scrapped after Carpenter pulled out due to an undisclosed injury. They were previously scheduled to meet at the sixth season of Dana White's Contender Series in 2022 and UFC Fight Night: Dern vs. Hill in May 2023, but Erceg pulled out both times due to visa issues. Erceg was rescheduled against David Dvořák at UFC 289.

The Ultimate Fighter: Heavy Hitters women's featherweight winner Macy Chiasson was expected to face former Invicta FC Bantamweight Champion and UFC Women's Featherweight Championship challenger Yana Santos in a bantamweight bout at the preliminary card. However, Chiasson pulled out two weeks after the fight announcement and was replaced by Karol Rosa in a featherweight bout.

A featherweight bout between Joanderson Brito and Khusein Askhabov was expected to take place at the event. However, Askhabov withdrew for unknown reasons and was replaced by Westin Wilson.

== Results ==
Main Card (ESPN / ESPN+)
Weight class				Method	Round	Time	Notes
Middleweight	Sean Strickland	def.	Abusupiyan Magomedov	TKO (punches)	2	4:20
Lightweight	Grant Dawson	def.	Damir Ismagulov	Decision (unanimous) (30–26, 30–27, 30–27)	3	5:00
Welterweight	Michael Morales	def.	Max Griffin	Decision (unanimous) (29–28, 29–28, 29–28)	3	5:00
Women's Flyweight	Ariane Lipski	def.	Melissa Gatto	Decision (split) (28–29, 30–27, 29–28)	3	5:00
Lightweight	Benoît Saint Denis	def.	Ismael Bonfim	Submission (rear-naked choke)	1	4:48
Middleweight	Nursulton Ruziboev	def.	Brunno Ferreira	KO (punches)	1	1:17
Preliminary card (ESPN / ESPN+)
Welterweight	Rinat Fakhretdinov	def.	Kevin Lee	Technical Submission (guillotine choke)	1	0:55
Featherweight	Joanderson Brito	def.	Westin Wilson	KO (punches)	1	2:54
Women's Featherweight	Karol Rosa	def.	Yana Santos	Decision (split) (28–29, 29–28, 29–28)	3	5:00
Lightweight	Elves Brener	def.	Guram Kutateladze	TKO (punches)	3	3:17
Women's Flyweight	Luana Carolina	def.	Ivana Petrović	Decision (unanimous) (29–28, 29–28, 29–28)	3	5:00
Heavyweight	Alexander Romanov	def.	Blagoy Ivanov	Decision (unanimous) (30–27, 30–27, 30–27)	3	5:00

== Bonus awards ==
The following fighters received $50,000 bonuses.

- Fight of the Night: Elves Brenner vs. Guram Kutateladze
- Performance of the Night: Sean Strickland and Nursulton Ruziboev

== See also ==
- List of UFC events
- List of current UFC fighters
- 2023 in UFC
