= Benoît Saint Denis =

French mixed martial artist (born 1995)

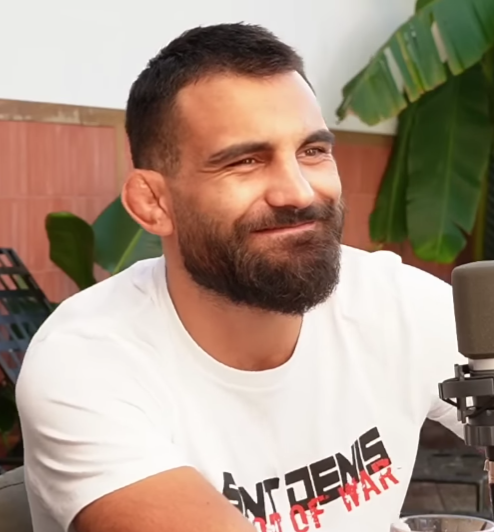
- Saint Denis in 2023
- Born: December 18, 1995 (age 30); Nîmes, Gard, France
- Nickname: God of War
- Height: 5 ft 11 in (1.80 m)
- Weight: 155 lb (70 kg; 11 st 1 lb)
- Division: Lightweight (2022–present); Super Lightweight (2020–2021); Welterweight (2019–2020, 2021); Middleweight (2019)
- Reach: 73 in (185 cm)
- Fighting out of: Paris, France
- Trainer: Nicolas Ott
- Rank: Brown belt in Brazilian Jiu-Jitsu; Black belt in Judo
- Years active: 2019–present

Mixed martial arts record
- Total: 22
- Wins: 17
- By knockout: 6
- By submission: 11
- Losses: 4
- By knockout: 2
- By submission: 1
- By decision: 1
- No contests: 1

Amateur record
- Total: 3
- Wins: 3
- By submission: 2

Other information
- Spouse: Laura Saint Denis
- Children: 2
- Mixed martial arts record from Sherdog
- Military career
- Allegiance: France
- Branch: French Army
- Service years: 2014–2019
- Rank: Corporal
- Unit: 1st Marine Infantry Parachute Regiment
- Conflicts: Mali War
- Awards: Medal of the Nation's Gratitude; Combatant's Cross

Benoît Saint Denis (Note: Sometimes stylized as Benoît Saint-Denis in French.) (born December 18, 1995), is a French professional mixed martial artist and former French Army Special Forces soldier who currently competes in the lightweight division of the Ultimate Fighting Championship (UFC). As of October 31, 2026, he is #8 in the Meta UFC lightweight rankings.

== Background ==
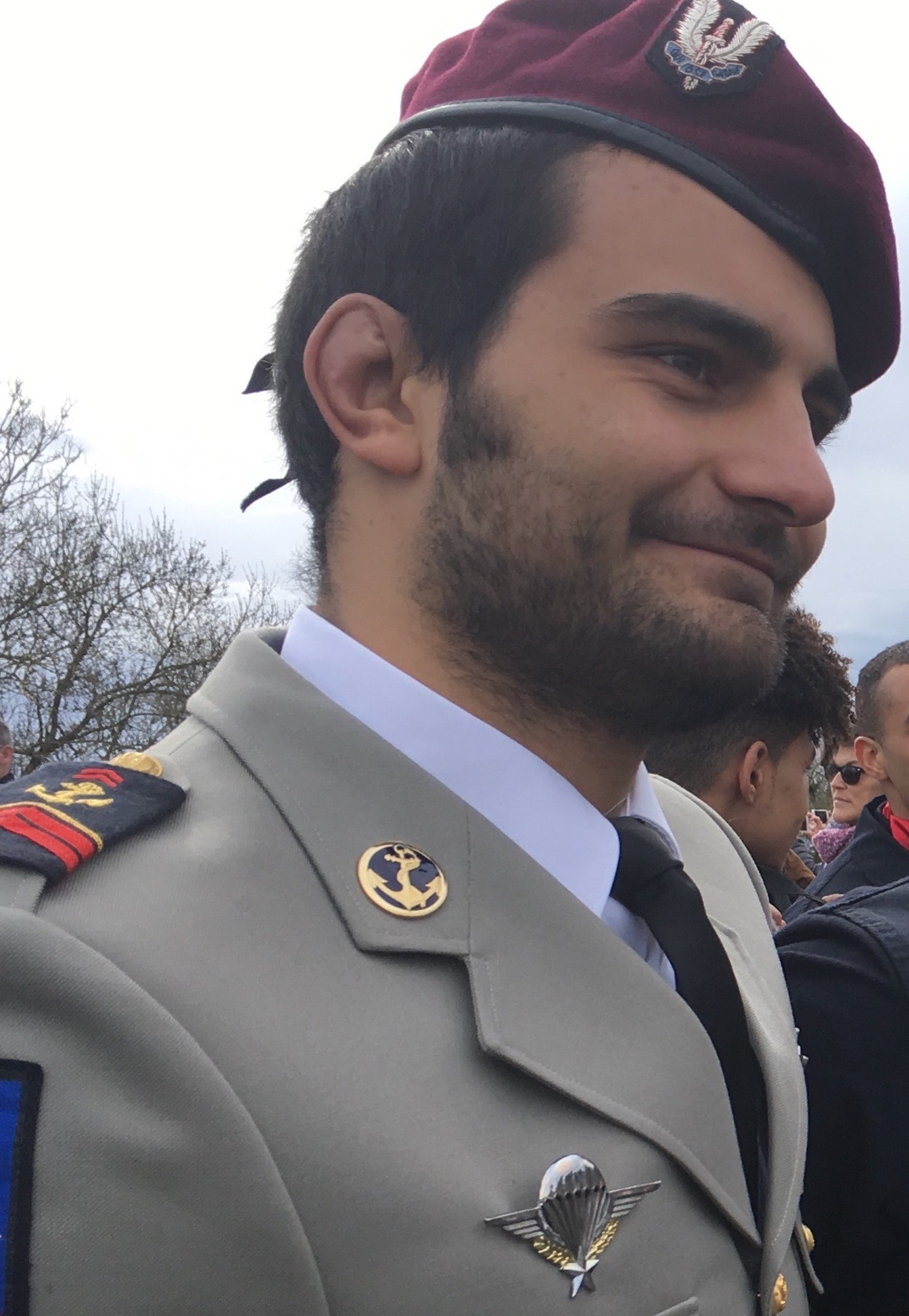
Saint Denis in 2018

Benoît Saint Denis was born in Nîmes, on December 18, 1995, as the eldest of five brothers. His father is a French Army officer who practiced judo, and his mother is a teacher. Saint Denis trained in judo in France and Germany beginning at the age of 8 and earned a black belt. He also played football and rugby union in his youth.

Prior to his MMA career, Saint Denis was a member of the 1st Marine Infantry Paratroopers Regiment, a unit of the French Army Special Forces Command. He served as a French Special Air Service (SAS) operator in Mali during the Mali War. He was awarded the Medal of the Nation's Gratitude and the Combatant's Cross in September 2017. He left the army after five years of service in March 2019.

== Early kickboxing and BJJ career ==
Saint Denis began kick-boxing with Stéphane Susperregui and Brazilian jiu-jitsu (BJJ) with Christophe Savoca in 2017 in the Bayonne region close to his regiment.

He also competed in BJJ, winning the medium-heavyweight (under 88,3 kg/194 lbs) division, in blue belt, at the 2017 West Zone Championship in France. He participated in the 2017 IBJJF Paris International Open No Gi Championship, in the medium-heavyweight (under 88,3 kg/194 lbs) division, taking 3rd place.

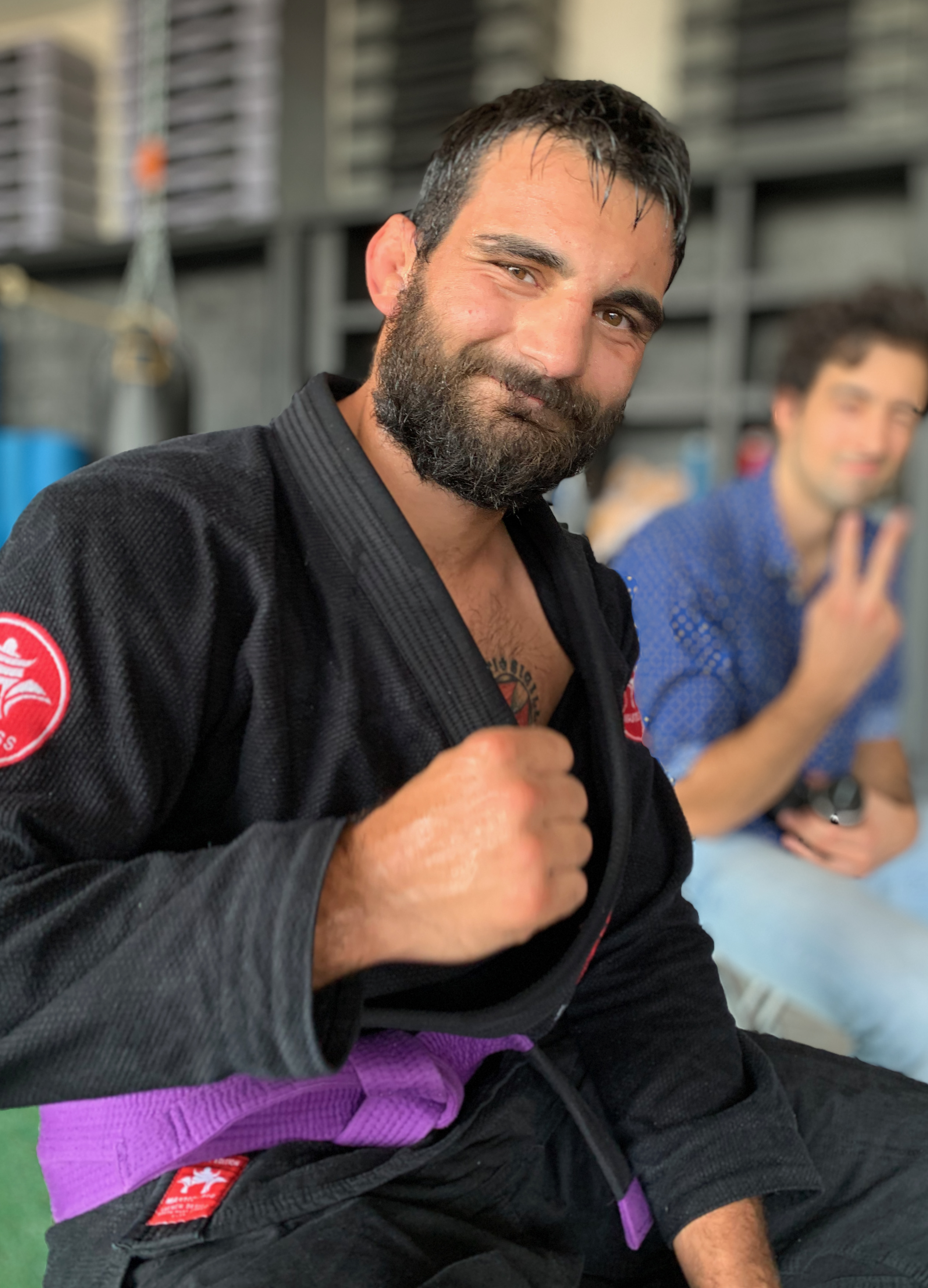
Saint Denis training BJJ in 2019

He won the middleweight (under 82,3 kg/181 lbs) division, at blue belt, in the absolute category, and took 2nd place in the regular category at the 2018 West Zone Championship in France. He won the medium-heavyweight division, in blue belt, at the IBJJF Paris International Open Gi Championship in Spring 2018.

He was also the winner of both gi and no-gi divisions in the 2019 France National Championship, at blue belt in the middleweight (under 82,3 kg/181 lbs) division. He also participated in two shows for ACB JJ, notably facing Yusup Raisov, losing by points.

In September 2017, he started MMA initially to improve his SAS close combat skills and tested himself in the Invictus XV 8-men amateur tournament winning the first two matches by submission and the final by decision, against an opponent with pro experience in the middleweight division on December 16, 2017, in San Sebastián, Spain.

Passionate about MMA, he was thinking of making it his career. In July 2018, Christophe Savoca asked Luiz Tosta, a Brazilian colleague to host Saint Denis for a week at his MMA gym in London, Shootfighters, where Michael Page is training. The Brazilian confirmed that Saint Denis was capable of launching into professional MMA.

== Mixed martial arts career ==
In September 2018, Saint Denis stood out among thirty fighters during a test organized by Daniel Woirin, a French coach renowned for having won three belts at UFC and two at Strikeforce with MMA champions Anderson Silva, Dan Henderson and Lyoto Machida. Saint Denis, ending his contract with the army, decided to embark on a career as a professional MMA fighter early 2019. He gave himself two years to break through to the highest level in MMA. Two years was the time he had with his savings to train full time and get signed by the UFC.

He joined the Bulgarian Top Team of French manager Giom Peltier and won six fights in eleven months. Then the pace of the fights slowed down due to the COVID-19 pandemic. With Daniel Woirin, he stayed undefeated and went eight wins by finish in middleweight, welterweight and super lightweight divisions, half of them at the Brave Combat Federation, where he ended up as the #1 Title contender of the super lightweight division at the time he accepted to join the UFC.

=== Ultimate Fighting Championship ===
==== 2021 ====
Saint Denis made his UFC debut in the welterweight division on short notice against Elizeu Zaleski dos Santos on October 30, 2021, at UFC 267. He lost the fight via unanimous decision.

==== 2022 ====
Cutting to lightweight, Saint Denis faced Niklas Stolze on June 4, 2022, at UFC Fight Night: Volkov vs. Rozenstruik. He won the bout after submitting Stolze via rear-naked choke in the second round.

He was scheduled to face Christos Giagos on September 3, 2022, at UFC Fight Night 209, in Paris. However, Giagos pulled out in August after a domestic accident. Consequently, Saint Denis faced Gabriel Miranda. He won the fight via technical knockout in the early second round. This win earned him the Performance of the Night award.

==== 2023 ====
Saint Denis was scheduled to face Joe Solecki on February 18, 2023, at UFC Fight Night 219. However, he withdrew from the bout due to ankle injury.

Saint Denis was scheduled to face Vinc Pichel on July 1, 2023, at UFC on ESPN 48. However, Pichel pulled out in late-May due to injury and was replaced by Ismael Bonfim. Saint Denis won the fight via a first round rear-naked choke submission.

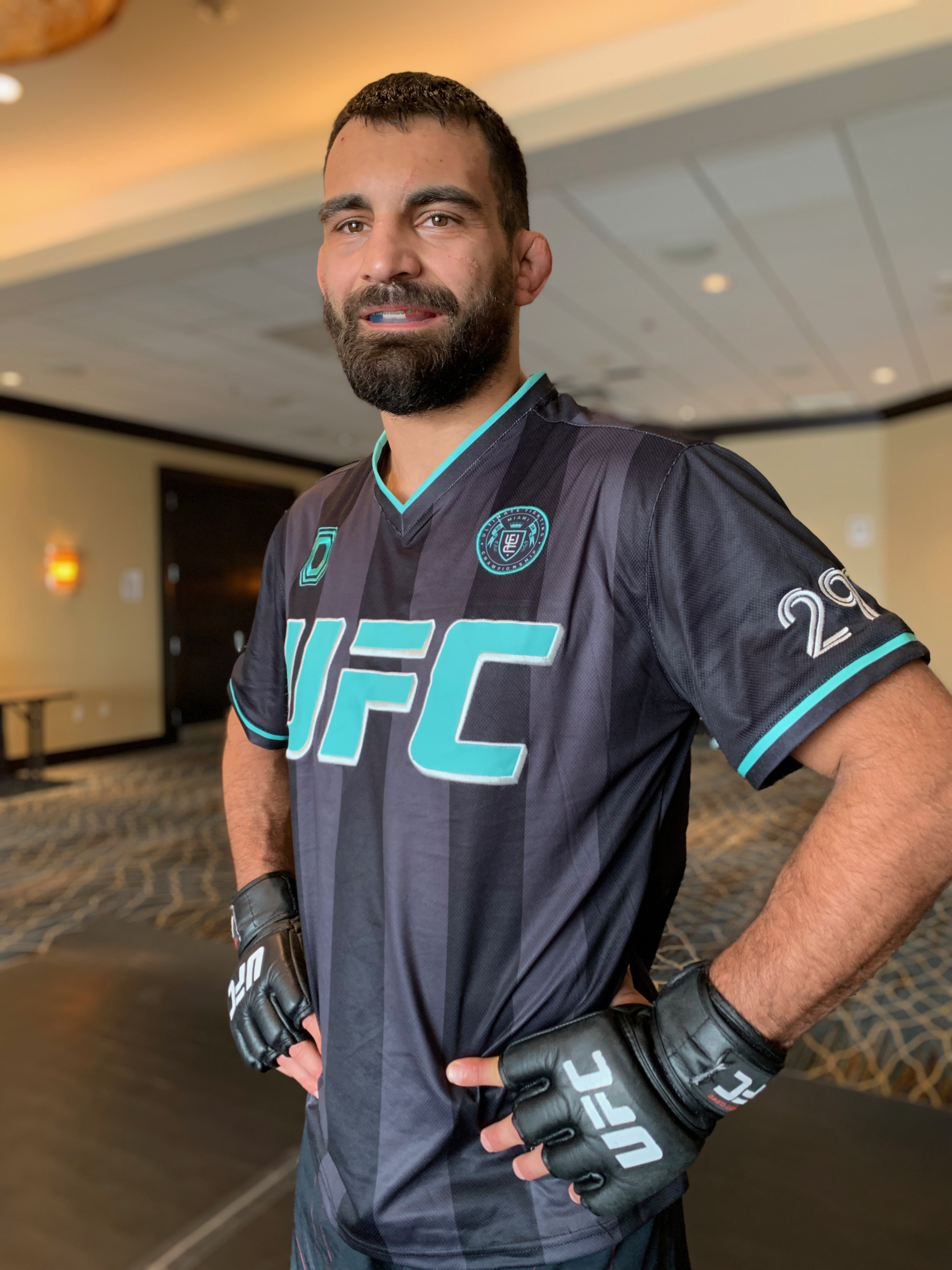
Benoît Saint Denis in 2024

For the beginning of his second contract with the UFC, Saint Denis faced Thiago Moisés on September 2, 2023, at UFC Fight Night 226, in Paris. He won the fight by TKO at the second round. This fight earned him the Fight of the Night bonus award.

Saint Denis faced Matt Frevola on November 11, 2023, at UFC 295. He won the fight via knockout in the first round and the victory earned him the Performance of the Night award. Frevola signed off with a salute to Saint Denis who responded in kind during this veterans day.

==== 2024 ====
For the beginning of his third contract with the UFC, Saint Denis faced Dustin Poirier in a 5-round co-main for UFC 299 on March 9, 2024. According to Dustin Poirier, the fight was initially pencilled at the start of the main card of UFC 300 scheduled on April 13, 2024, at the T-Mobile Arena in Paradise, Nevada. After discussions, the fight was officially announced for UFC 299. Saint Denis lost the fight by knockout in the second round; however it earned him another Fight of the Night award.

Saint Denis faced Renato Moicano on September 28, 2024, in the main event of UFC Fight Night 243. He lost the fight by technical knockout due to doctor stoppage at the end of the second round as a result of damage done to his right eye.

Following these defeats, Saint Denis chose a new headcoach, Nicolas Ott, who is also coaching Nassourdine Imavov.

==== 2025 ====
Saint Denis was scheduled to face Joel Álvarez on May 10, 2025 at UFC 315. However, Álvarez withdrew due to a hand injury the week before and was replaced by Kyle Prepolec. He won the fight via an arm-triangle choke submission in the second round.

Saint Denis faced Maurício Ruffy in the co-main event on September 6, 2025 at UFC Fight Night 258, in Paris. He won the fight via a face crank choke submission in the second round. This fight earned him another Performance of the Night award.

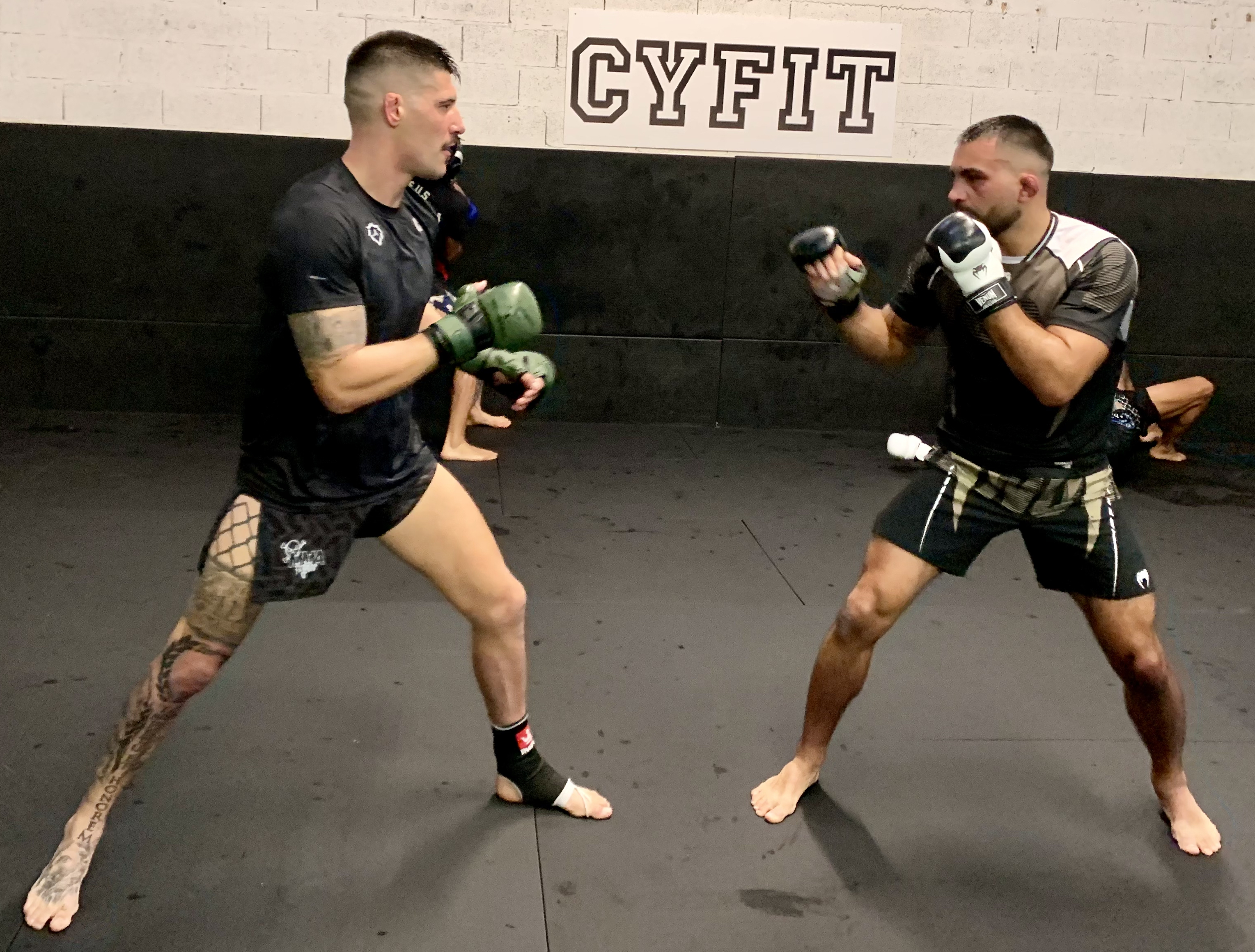
Saint Denis training with Joel Alvarez, April 2026

Saint Denis faced Beneil Dariush on November 15, 2025, at UFC 322. At the weigh-ins, Dariush weighed in at 157.2 pounds, 1.2 pounds over the lightweight non-title fight limit. The bout proceeded at catchweight and Dariush was fined 25 percent of his purse, which went to Saint Denis. He won the fight by knockout sixteen seconds into the first round. This fight earned him another Performance of the Night award.

==== 2026 ====
Saint Denis faced Dan Hooker in the co-main event on February 1, 2026 at UFC 325. He won the fight by technical knockout in the second round.

Saint Denis was offered to compete against Michael Chandler on June 14, 2026 at UFC Freedom 250 but he declined following an injury. He resumed training in April 2026 and assisted Spaniard Joel Alvarez in preparation for his next fight.

Saint Denis faced former interim UFC Lightweight Championship challenger Paddy Pimblett on July 11, 2026, in the co-main event of UFC 329. He lost the fight by technical submission via a Peruvian necktie in the first round.

==== 2027 ====
Saint Denis is scheduled to face Quillan Salkilld in the main event on February 7, 2027 at UFC Fight Night 298.

== Professional grappling career ==
Saint Denis faced Marc Diakiese in the no gi main event of ADXC 4 on May 18, 2024. He won the match by unanimous decision.

== Fighting style ==
Saint Denis fights in a Southpaw stance. His mixed martial arts combat style is built around wrestling and submissions, and though he is willing to stand and trade, he typically uses his striking to force opponents to the fence so he can look for takedowns and submissions.

Saint Denis is a finisher. He exerts constant pressure on his opponent until he manages to finish him, ignoring counter strikes. This materializes in all 17 wins by finish including 6 knockouts and 11 submissions. Half of them occurred within the first round.

Saint Denis chose God of War nickname, on the advice of his brothers, after his third professional victory. This reflects his military background and MMA warrior attitude.

Saint Denis' walkout track is based on the French Commandos’ song and Seine Saint-Denis Style from the french hip hop group Suprême NTM.

== Personal life ==
The cross of the Order of the Temple, tattooed on Benoît Saint Denis's left pectoral.

Besides his MMA career, Saint Denis sometimes worked as an instructor and a trainer for a French private security company named Chiron. He married his fiancée Laura, a week before his fight at UFC Fight Night 209. The couple had a daughter in July 2023 and a son in August 2025.

Laura is a former French international futsal player who won the European Champions league with Toulouse Metropole FC. She was working as a dog trainer and shooting instructor in the police and she was the first French female police officer undergoing Special weapons and Tactics (SWAT) course. Holding a master's degree in Sports Management, she is Saint Denis' agent, handling his sponsors and social networks.

Saint Denis has four tattoos: the dagger from the French Special Forces, the samurai helmet from his first BJJ club, Joan of Arc for chivalrous spirit, and a Templar cross as a reminder of the security missions he carried out in Mali.

In 2024, at the request of the French Armed Forces, he sponsored the French military MMA team, supported wounded soldiers' charities and participated in the Army's recruitment effort.

Saint Denis is Catholic. In 2025, he was invited to join a prayer challenge organized by Hallow app, together with celebrities such as Mark Wahlberg.

== Media ==
=== Video games ===
Year	Title	Role	Notes
2024	EA Sports UFC 5	Himself	Playable character
2026	EA Sports UFC 6	Himself	Playable character

=== Films ===
- In 2025, Saint Denis served as an MMA judge on a French reality TV show broadcast by Netflix in 2026, l'Arène.
- In 2026, he provides the voice for Zangiev character, played by Olivier Richters in the French version of Street Fighter.

=== Books ===
- Saint Denis wrote the introduction for the French edition of Tim Kennedy's "Scars and Stripes: An Unapologetically American Story of Fighting the Taliban, UFC Warriors, and Myself"
- In 2024, Saint Denis released an autobiographic comic strip "Benoit Saint Denis, God of War "

== Championships and accomplishments ==
=== Mixed martial arts ===
- Ultimate Fighting Championship
  - Performance of the Night (Four times) vs. Gabriel Miranda, Matt Frevola, Maurício Ruffy and Beneil Dariush
    - Performance of the Month (One time) vs. Matt Frevola
  - Fight of the Night (Two times) vs. Thiago Moisés and Dustin Poirier
    - Fight of the Month (One time) vs. Thiago Moisés
  - Highest significant strike accuracy in UFC Lightweight division history (61.3%)
  - Fourth highest striking differential in UFC Lightweight division history (3.02)
  - Sixth highest control percentage in UFC Lightweight division history (54.4%)
  - Fourth highest top position percentage in UFC Lightweight division history (43.7%)
  - Most finishes in the UFC since 2022 (9)
  - First French fighter to compete and to win on a UFC card in France
    - First French fighter to be ranked in the lightweight division
    - Fastest finish from a French fighter at UFC
  - UFC Honors Awards
    - 2024: President's Choice Fight of the Year Nominee vs. Dustin Poirier
  - UFC.com Awards
    - 2024: Ranked #5 Fight of the Year vs. Dustin Poirier
    - 2023: Ranked #7 Fighter of the Year
- World MMA Awards
  - 2024 Nominee, Breakthrough Fighter of the Year (nomination period spanned from July 1, 2023, and June 30, 2024)
  - 2024 Nominee, Fight of the Year
- MMA Fighting
  - 2023 First Team MMA All-Star
  - 2025 First Team MMA All-Star
- MMA Junkie
  - September, 2025, Submission of the Month vs. Maurício Ruffy
- MMA Mania
  - 2025 Fighter of the Year - Honorable Mention
- Brave Combat Federation
  - 2020 Brave CF Submission of the Year
  - Number 1 Contender, Super Lightweight division
- Staredown Fighting Championship
  - 2019 SFC Welterweight Championship (one time)

== Mixed martial arts record ==
Professional record breakdown
22 matches	17 wins	4 losses
By knockout	6	2
By submission	11	1
By decision	0	1
No contests	1	

Res.	Record	Opponent	Method	Event	Date	Round	Time	Location	Notes
Loss	17–4 (1)	Paddy Pimblett	Technical Submission (Peruvian necktie)	UFC 329	July 11, 2026	1	0:52	Las Vegas, Nevada, United States	
Win	17–3 (1)	Dan Hooker	TKO (elbows and punches)	UFC 325	February 1, 2026	2	4:45	Sydney, Australia	
Win	16–3 (1)	Beneil Dariush	KO (punches)	UFC 322	November 15, 2025	1	0:16	New York City, New York, United States	Catchweight (157.2 lb) bout; Dariush missed weight. Performance of the Night.
Win	15–3 (1)	Maurício Ruffy	Submission (face crank)	UFC Fight Night: Imavov vs. Borralho	September 6, 2025	2	2:56	Paris, France	Performance of the Night.
Win	14–3 (1)	Kyle Prepolec	Submission (arm-triangle choke)	UFC 315	May 10, 2025	2	2:35	Montreal, Quebec, Canada	
Loss	13–3 (1)	Renato Moicano	TKO (doctor stoppage)	UFC Fight Night: Moicano vs. Saint Denis	September 28, 2024	2	5:00	Paris, France	
Loss	13–2 (1)	Dustin Poirier	KO (punches)	UFC 299	March 9, 2024	2	2:32	Miami, Florida, United States	Fight of the Night.
Win	13–1 (1)	Matt Frevola	KO (head kick)	UFC 295	November 11, 2023	1	1:31	New York City, New York, United States	Performance of the Night.
Win	12–1 (1)	Thiago Moisés	TKO (punches)	UFC Fight Night: Gane vs. Spivac	September 2, 2023	2	4:44	Paris, France	Fight of the Night.
Win	11–1 (1)	Ismael Bonfim	Submission (face crank)	UFC on ESPN: Strickland vs. Magomedov	July 1, 2023	1	4:48	Las Vegas, Nevada, United States	
Win	10–1 (1)	Gabriel Miranda	TKO (punches)	UFC Fight Night: Gane vs. Tuivasa	September 3, 2022	2	0:16	Paris, France	Performance of the Night.
Win	9–1 (1)	Niklas Stolze	Submission (rear-naked choke)	UFC Fight Night: Volkov vs. Rozenstruik	June 4, 2022	2	1:32	Las Vegas, Nevada, United States	Lightweight debut.
Loss	8–1 (1)	Elizeu Zaleski dos Santos	Decision (unanimous)	UFC 267	October 30, 2021	3	5:00	Abu Dhabi, United Arab Emirates	Welterweight bout. Zaleski dos Santos was deducted one point in round 3 due to a groin strike.
Win	8–0 (1)	Arkaitz Ramos Gudari	Submission (arm-triangle choke)	Brave CF 52	August 1, 2021	1	3:09	Milan, Italy	
Win	7–0 (1)	Luan Santiago	Submission (arm-triangle choke)	Brave CF 49	March 25, 2021	2	3:51	Arad, Bahrain	
Win	6–0 (1)	Mario Saeed	TKO (punches)	Brave CF 38	August 8, 2020	2	1:49	Stockholm, Sweden	Super Lightweight (165 lb) debut.
Win	5–0 (1)	Ivica Trušček	Submission (kneebar)	Brave CF 34	January 19, 2020	1	3:39	Ljubljana, Slovenia	
NC	4–0 (1)	Paweł Kiełek	NC (accidental clash of heads)	Brave CF 28	November 4, 2019	2	5:00	Bucharest, Romania	Accidental clash of heads rendered Saint Denis unable to continue.
Win	4–0	Ibragim Baisarov	Submission (armbar)	European Beatdown 7	October 12, 2019	1	2:47	Mons, Belgium	
Win	3–0	Antoine Bensimon	Submission (guillotine choke)	Vic Fight: Trophée de France	June 15, 2019	1	4:00	Longjumeau, France	
Win	2–0	Artur Szczepaniak	Submission (rear-naked choke)	Staredown FC 14	March 21, 2019	3	3:00	Antwerp, Belgium	Welterweight debut. Won the vacant Staredown FC Welterweight Championship.
Win	1–0	Marc Domont	Technical Submission (guillotine choke)	Lions FC 8	February 16, 2019	1	3:29	Neuchâtel, Switzerland	Middleweight debut.

== See also ==
- List of current UFC fighters
- List of male mixed martial artists
