= UFC Fight Night: Volkov vs. Rozenstruik =

2022 mixed martial arts event

- The poster for UFC Fight Night: Volkov vs. Rozenstruik
- Promotion: Ultimate Fighting Championship
- Date: June 4, 2022
- Venue: UFC Apex
- City: Enterprise, Nevada, United States
- Attendance: Not announced

Event chronology
UFC Fight Night: Holm vs. Vieira	UFC Fight Night: Volkov vs. Rozenstruik	UFC 275: Teixeira vs. Procházka

UFC Fight Night: Volkov vs. Rozenstruik (also known as UFC Fight Night 207 and UFC on ESPN+ 65 or UFC Vegas 56) was a mixed martial arts event produced by the Ultimate Fighting Championship that took place on June 4, 2022, at the UFC Apex facility in Enterprise, Nevada, part of the Las Vegas Metropolitan Area, United States.

== Background ==
A heavyweight bout between Alexander Volkov, a former Bellator Heavyweight World Champion, and Jairzinho Rozenstruik headlined the event.

A light heavyweight match between Alonzo Menifield and Nicolae Negumereanu was scheduled for the event. However, Negumereanu was removed from the event due to undisclosed reasons and replaced by Askar Mozharov.

Joaquin Buckley and Abusupiyan Magomedov were scheduled for a match at middleweight. However, the bout was cancelled for unknown reasons.

Darrick Minner was scheduled to face Damon Jackson in a featherweight bout at the event. In May, Minner was pulled due to undisclosed reasons and replaced by newcomer Daniel Argueta.

== Results ==
Main card (ESPN+)
Weight class				Method	Round	Time	Notes
Heavyweight	Alexander Volkov	def.	Jairzinho Rozenstruik	TKO (punches)	1	2:12
Featherweight	Movsar Evloev	def.	Dan Ige	Decision (unanimous) (30–26, 30–27, 30–27)	3	5:00
Featherweight	Lucas Almeida	def.	Michael Trizano	TKO (punches)	3	0:55
Women's Flyweight	Karine Silva	def.	Poliana Botelho	Submission (D'Arce choke)	1	4:55
Flyweight	Ode' Osbourne	def.	Zarrukh Adashev	KO (punches)	1	1:01
Light Heavyweight	Alonzo Menifield	def.	Askar Mozharov	TKO (elbows)	1	4:40
Preliminary card (ESPN+)
Women's Strawweight	Karolina Kowalkiewicz	def.	Felice Herrig	Submission (rear-naked choke)	2	4:01
Lightweight	Joe Solecki	def.	Alex da Silva Coelho	Decision (majority) (28–28, 28–27, 29–27)	3	5:00	(Note: Coelho was deducted one point in round 2 for repeatedly locking his toes in the fence.)
Featherweight	Damon Jackson	def.	Daniel Argueta	Decision (unanimous) (30–27, 30–27, 29–28)	3	5:00
Lightweight	Benoît Saint Denis	def.	Niklas Stolze	Submission (rear-naked choke)	2	1:32
Bantamweight	Tony Gravely	def.	Johnny Muñoz Jr.	KO (punches)	1	1:08
Flyweight	Jeff Molina	def.	Zhalgas Zhumagulov	Decision (split) (28–29, 29–28, 30–27)	3	5:00
Welterweight	Rinat Fakhretdinov	def.	Andreas Michailidis	Decision (unanimous) (30–26, 30–26, 30–27)	3	5:00
Women's Flyweight	Erin Blanchfield	def.	JJ Aldrich	Submission (guillotine choke)	2	2:38

== Bonus awards ==
The following fighters received $50,000 bonuses.

- Fight of the Night award: Lucas Almeida vs. Michael Trizano
- Performance of the Night awards: Karine Silva and Ode' Osbourne

== See also ==
- List of UFC events
- List of current UFC fighters
- 2022 in UFC
