= Andreas Michailidis =

Greek mixed martial arts fighter

- Born: July 18, 1988 (age 38); Kazakh SSR, Soviet Union
- Other names: The Spartan
- Nationality: Greek
- Height: 182 cm (6 ft 0 in)
- Weight: 77 kg (170 lb; 12 st 2 lb)
- Division: Welterweight (2022–present); Middleweight (2009–2021); Light heavyweight (2020)
- Reach: 192 cm (76 in)
- Fighting out of: Athens, Greece
- Team: EFL Martial Arts Academy
- Years active: 2009–present

Mixed martial arts record
- Total: 25
- Wins: 16
- By knockout: 8
- By submission: 5
- By decision: 3
- Losses: 9
- By knockout: 5
- By submission: 2
- By decision: 2

Other information
- Mixed martial arts record from Sherdog

Andreas Michailidis (Greek: Ανδρέας Μιχαηλίδης, born July 18, 1988) is a Greek mixed martial artist who competes in the Welterweight division of Oktagon MMA. He has competed in the Ultimate Fighting Championship (UFC) and Bellator MMA.

== Background ==
Michailidis is of Pontic Greek origin. At the age of 8, after moving from Kazakhstan to Greece, he started training, in wrestling and kickboxing at Malios Team. Continuing on with MMA and Brazilian Jiu-Jitsu training at Gracie Barra Greece where he achieved a black belt in Brazilian Jiu-Jitsu.

== Mixed martial arts career ==
=== Early career ===
After competing in numerous national Brazilian Jiu-Jitsu championships and tournaments, several MMA fights in Greece, winning the European Fight League Championship (EFL) Light Heavyweight Title, Michailidis moved to America to train with Antonio McKee and Quinton “Rampage” Jackson, for his upcoming fight in King Of The Cage: Slugfest.

A few months later, Michailidis faced Jason Butcher at Bellator 128 on October 10, 2014. He lost the fight via TKO in the second round.

After a year of training in Kings MMA, Michailidis traveled to Russia to fight in the World Fighting Championship Akhmat 9, where he won via TKO in the first round. Few months later his next successful appearance was in the United Arab Emirates to fight at Abu Dhabi Warriors 4 against Ion Pascu, where he won via unanimous decision.

Michailidis faced Evgeny Shalomaev at Fight Nights Global 63: Alibekov vs. Khamitov on April 21, 2017. He won the bout via TKO in the first round.

Michailidis faced Vladimir Mineev at Fight Nights Global 71: Mineev vs. Michailidis on July 29, 2017. He lost the bout via TKO in the third round.

Michailidis faced Marcel Fortuna at Titan FC 54 on April 26, 2019. He won the bout via spinning back kick in the first round.

=== Ultimate Fighting Championship ===
Michailidis made his UFC debut, as a short notice replacement for Vinicius Moreira, against Modestas Bukauskas at UFC on ESPN: Kattar vs. Ige on July 16, 2020. Michailidis lost the bout via TKO after he could not get up at the end of the round due to a series of illegal elbows to the back of the head. The referee's decision raised a lot of criticism in the MMA community, as many believe that the match should end as a DQ or at least a no contest. In the process, he became the first Greek fighter based in Greece appear in the UFC, and second fighter born in Greece, after Anthony Christodoulou.

Michailidis was expected to face Antônio Arroyo at UFC Fight Night: Felder vs. dos Anjos on November 14, 2020. However, Michailidis withdrew on October 23 due to undisclosed reasons and was replaced Eryk Anders.

Michailidis faced KB Bhullar at UFC on ESPN: Reyes vs. Procházka on May 1, 2021 He won the bout via unanimous decision.

Michailidis faced promotional newcomer Alex Pereira on November 6, 2021, at UFC 268. He lost the fight via TKO early in round two after getting knocked down with a flying knee.

Michailidis faced Rinat Fakhretdinov on June 4, 2022, at UFC Fight Night 207. He lost the fight via unanimous decision.

On June 8, 2022, it was confirmed that Michailidis was no longer on the UFC roster.

=== Oktagon MMA ===
Michailidis faced Leandro Silva on March 4, 2023, at Oktagon 40 in the Oktagon Welterweight Tournament Round of 16, winning the bout via unanimous decision.

In the Quarterfinals, Michailidis faced Marcel Grabinski on June 17, 2023, at Oktagon 44, winning the bout and advancing via second round arm-triangle choke.

The semi-finals saw Michailidis faced Louis Glismann on September 16, 2023, at Oktagon 46, knocking him out 33 seconds into the bout.

In the finals, Michailidis faced Bojan Veličković on December 29, 2023, getting submitted in the third round via rear-naked choke.

In his first bout after losing the finals of the tournament, Michailidis faced Piotr Waerzyniak on July 20, 2024, at Oktagon 59, losing via split decision.

== Championships and accomplishments ==
=== Mixed martial arts ===
- Cage Survivor
  - CS Middleweight Championship
- European Fight League EFL
  - EFL Light Heavyweight Championship
- Mad Dog Promotion
  - Mad Dog Middleweight Championship

== Mixed martial arts record ==
Professional record breakdown
25 matches	16 wins	9 losses
By knockout	8	5
By submission	5	2
By decision	3	2

Res.	Record	Opponent	Method	Event	Date	Round	Time	Location	Notes
Loss	16–9	Mark Hulme	Submission (guillotine choke)	Oktagon 67	February 22, 2025	1	2:20	Třinec, Czech Republic	Oktagon Middleweight Tournament Round of 16.
Loss	16–8	Piotr Wawrzyniak	Decision (split)	Oktagon 59	July 20, 2024	3	5:00	Bratislava, Slovakia	Return to Middleweight.
Loss	16–7	Bojan Veličković	Submission (rear-naked choke)	Oktagon 51	December 29, 2023	3	3:21	Prague, Czech Republic	Oktagon Welterweight Tournament Final.
Win	16–6	Louis Glismann	KO (punches)	Oktagon 46	September 16, 2023	1	0:33	Frankfurt, Germany	Oktagon Welterweight Tournament Semifinal.
Win	15–6	Marcel Grabinski	Submission (arm-triangle choke)	Oktagon 44	June 17, 2023	2	2:02	Oberhausen, Germany	Oktagon Welterweight Tournament Quarterfinal.
Win	14–6	Leandro Silva	Decision (unanimous)	Oktagon 40	March 4, 2023	3	5:00	Ostrava, Czech Republic	Oktagon Welterweight Tournament Round of 16.
Loss	13–6	Rinat Fakhretdinov	Decision (unanimous)	UFC Fight Night: Volkov vs. Rozenstruik	June 4, 2022	3	5:00	Las Vegas, Nevada, United States	Welterweight debut.
Loss	13–5	Alex Pereira	TKO (flying knee and punches)	UFC 268	November 6, 2021	2	0:18	New York City, New York, United States	
Win	13–4	KB Bhullar	Decision (unanimous)	UFC on ESPN: Reyes vs. Procházka	May 1, 2021	3	5:00	Las Vegas, Nevada, United States	Return to Middleweight.
Loss	12–4	Modestas Bukauskas	TKO (Elbows)	UFC on ESPN: Kattar vs. Ige	July 16, 2020	1	5:00	Abu Dhabi, United Arab Emirates	Light Heavyweight debut.
Win	12–3	Arymarcel Santos	TKO (punches)	Global Legion FC 13	December 13, 2019	1	2:13	Miramar, Florida, United States	Catchweight (195 lb) bout.
Win	11–3	Marcel Fortuna	TKO (spinning wheel kick and punches)	Titan FC 54	April 26, 2019	1	4:26	Fort Lauderdale, Florida, United States	
Win	10–3	Tomáš Bolo	TKO (punches)	WKN Greece: The Battle 17	December 10, 2017	1	2:03	Athens, Greece	Won the Cage Survivor Middleweight Championship.
Loss	9–3	Vladimir Mineev	TKO (punches)	Fight Nights Global 71	July 29, 2017	3	3:11	Moscow, Russia	
Win	9–2	Evgeny Shalomaev	TKO (punches)	Fight Nights Global 63	April 21, 2017	1	2:56	Vladivostok, Russia	
Win	8–2	Borce Talevski	TKO (punches)	Final Fight Championship 28	March 11, 2017	1	1:25	Athens, Greece	
Win	7–2	Ion Pascu	Decision (unanimous)	Abu Dhabi Warriors 4	May 24, 2016	3	5:00	Abu Dhabi, United Arab Emirates	
Win	6–2	Arbi Madaev	TKO (punches)	WFCA 9	October 4, 2015	1	2:15	Grozny, Russia	
Loss	5–2	Jason Butcher	TKO (punches)	Bellator 128	October 10, 2014	2	0:28	Thackerville, Oklahoma, United States	
Win	5–1	Daniel Hernandez	Submission (side choke)	KOTC: Slugfest	June 5, 2014	1	3:59	Highland, California, United States	
Win	4–1	Panagiotis Stroumpoulis	Submission (kimura)	European Fight League 2	May 29, 2011	1	2:35	Heraklion, Greece	
Win	3–1	Manolis Dimitriou	Submission (rear-naked choke)	European Fight League 2	May 29, 2011	2	1:35	Heraklion, Greece	
Win	2–1	Panagiotis Stroumpoulis	Submission (kimura)	European Fight League 1	March 20, 2011	2	1:00	Thessaloniki, Greece	
Loss	1–1	Emil Zahariev	TKO	Maxfight: Warriors 13	May 21, 2010	2	3:52	Sofia, Bulgaria	
Win	1–0	Giorgos Skouloudis	TKO (punches)	Spartan Warriors MMA 1	May 31, 2009	1	1:30	Athens, Greece	Middleweight debut.

== See also ==
- List of male mixed martial artists
