= Jimmy Crute =

Australian mixed martial artist

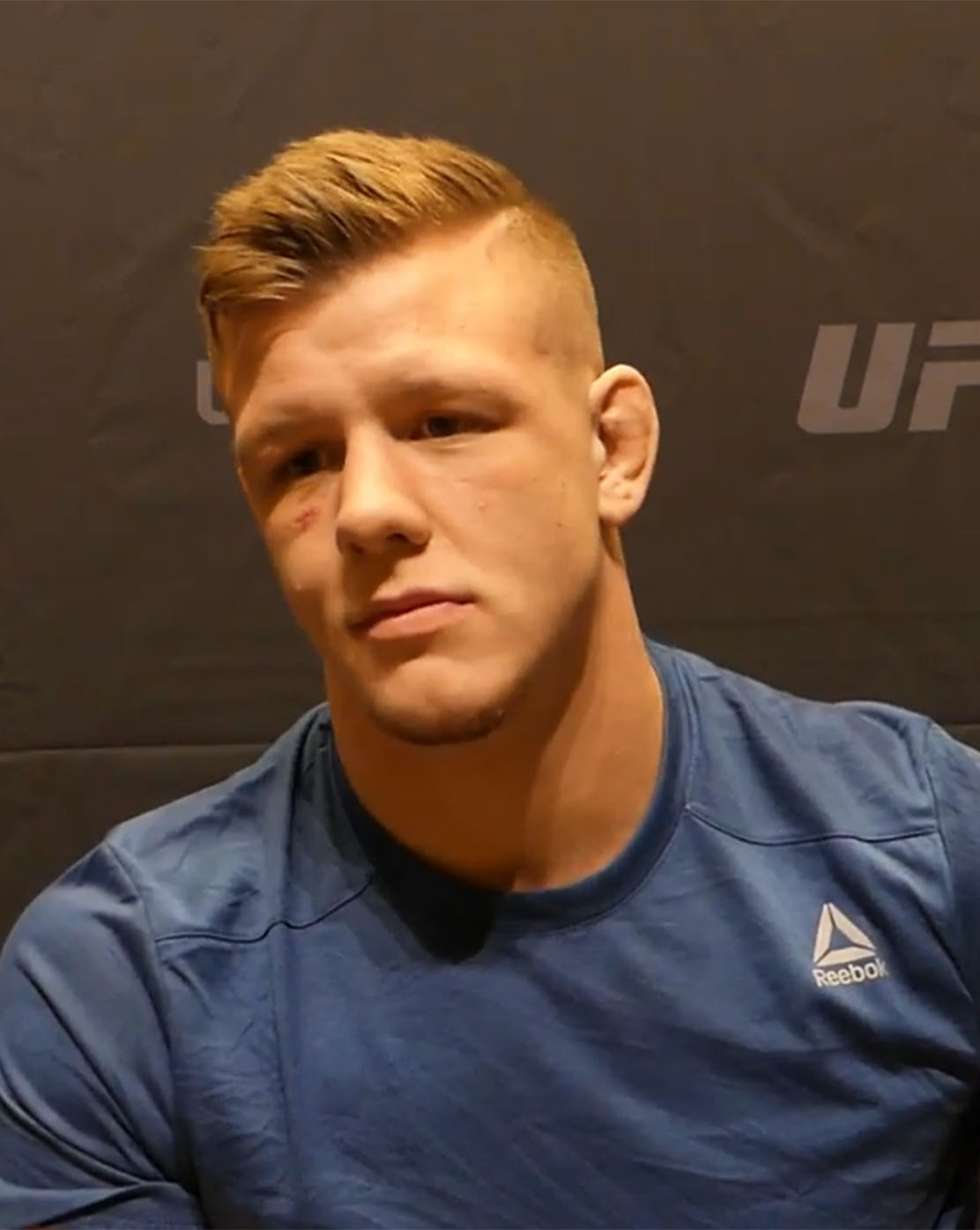
- Jimmy Crute at UFC 234 in Melbourne, February 2019
- Born: 4 March 1996 (age 30); Singleton, New South Wales, Australia
- Nickname: The Brute
- Height: 6 ft 2 in (1.88 m)
- Weight: 205 lb (93 kg; 14 st 9 lb)
- Division: Light heavyweight (2016–present)
- Reach: 74 in (188 cm)
- Stance: Orthodox
- Fighting out of: Bendigo, Victoria, Australia
- Team: Stewie's House of BJJ; Resilience Training Centre (until 2023); Combat 1 (2023–present)
- Teacher: Sam Greco
- Rank: Black belt in Brazilian Jiu-Jitsu
- Years active: 2016–present

Mixed martial arts record
- Total: 20
- Wins: 14
- By knockout: 5
- By submission: 6
- By decision: 3
- Losses: 4
- By knockout: 2
- By submission: 2
- Draws: 2

Other information
- Website: jimmycrute.com
- Mixed martial arts record from Sherdog

Jimmy Crute (born 4 March 1996) is an Australian professional mixed martial artist. He currently competes in the Light Heavyweight division in the Ultimate Fighting Championship (UFC). Crute was the former Australian Hex Fight Series Light Heavyweight Champion.

== Background ==
Crute comes from a long line of boxers on both parents’ sides, and his parents got him started in Karate at age four and Judo at eight. Crute started training Brazilian Jiu-Jitsu at the age of 11, however, it wasn't until he was 12 that discovered MMA. When he was 19, he made his professional debut in the Hex Fight Series in Melbourne, winning with a first round submission.

== Mixed martial arts career ==
=== Early career ===
Crute fought exclusively in Hex Fight Series in Australia where he won the light heavyweight championship and defended it twice. He amassed a record of 7–0 with two TKOs and two submissions prior to competing on Dana White's Contender Series.

=== Dana White's Contender Series ===
Crute faced Chris Birchler on Dana White's Contender Series 14 web-series program on 24 July 2018. He won the fight via technical knockout in round one and was awarded a UFC contract.

=== Ultimate Fighting Championship ===
Crute made his promotional debut on 2 December 2018 against Paul Craig at UFC Fight Night 142. He won the fight via kimura in the third round.

Crute faced Sam Alvey on 10 February 2019 at UFC 234. He won the fight via technical knockout in round one.

Crute faced Misha Cirkunov on 14 September 2019 at UFC Fight Night 158. He lost the back-and-forth fight via a Peruvian necktie submission in the first round.

Crute faced Michał Oleksiejczuk on 23 February 2020 at UFC Fight Night 168. He won the fight via a kimura submission in the first round. This win earned him a Performance of the Night award.

Crute faced Modestas Bukauskas on 18 October 2020 at UFC Fight Night: Ortega vs. The Korean Zombie. He won the fight via knockout in round one. This win earned him the Performance of the Night award.

Crute was scheduled to face Johnny Walker on 27 March 2021 at UFC 260. However, Walker pulled out of the fight in early February citing a chest injury. Subsequently, promotion officials elected to remove Crute from the card and reschedule him against Anthony Smith the following month at UFC 261. He lost the fight via doctor stoppage before the second round after suffering foot drop as a result of a leg kick by Smith, which rendered him unable to continue.

As the first bout of his new, four-fight contract, Crute was scheduled to face Jamahal Hill on 2 October 2021 at UFC Fight Night 193. However in early September, the bout was rescheduled to 4 December 2021 at UFC on ESPN: Font vs. Aldo. Crute lost the fight via knockout in round one.

Crute faced Alonzo Menifield on 12 February 2023, at UFC 284. The fight ended in a majority draw as Alonzo got a point deducted for grabbing the fence.

Crute then faced Menifield in a rematch on 8 July 2023, at UFC 290. He lost the fight via a guillotine choke submission in the second round. After the bout, he announced on his social media that he will be indefinitely stepping away to fix his 'unhealthy obsession' with the sport.

Crute was scheduled to face Marcin Prachnio on 9 February 2025, at UFC 312. However, Prachnio withdrew from the fight for unknown reasons and was replaced by former LFA Light Heavyweight Champion Rodolfo Bellato. The bout with Crute and Bellato was declared a majority draw.

Crute's bout with Marcin Prachnio was re-scheduled and took place on 19 July 2025 at UFC 318. He won the fight via an armbar submission at the end of the first round.

Crute faced Ivan Erslan on 28 September 2025 at UFC Fight Night 260. He won the fight via a can opener in round one. This fight earned him another Performance of the Night award.

Crute was scheduled to face Dustin Jacoby on 1 February 2026 at UFC 325. However, Crute withdrew due to a ruptured ACL.

== Championships and achievements ==
=== Mixed martial arts ===
- Ultimate Fighting Championship
  - Performance of the Night (Three times) vs. Michał Oleksiejczuk, Modestas Bukauskas and Ivan Erslan
- Hex Fight Series
  - Hex Fight Series Light Heavyweight Champion (one time)
    - Two successful title defenses

== Personal life ==
Crute has stated in an interview that he is a Christian.

Crute was a full-time forklift driver prior to being signed by the UFC.

== Mixed martial arts record ==
Professional record breakdown
20 matches	14 wins	4 losses
By knockout	5	2
By submission	6	2
By decision	3	0
Draws	2	

Res.	Record	Opponent	Method	Event	Date	Round	Time	Location	Notes
Win	14–4–2	Ivan Erslan	Submission (reverse can opener)	UFC Fight Night: Ulberg vs. Reyes	September 28, 2025	1	3:19	Perth, Australia	Performance of the Night.
Win	13–4–2	Marcin Prachnio	Submission (armbar)	UFC 318	July 19, 2025	1	4:41	New Orleans, Louisiana, United States	
Draw	12–4–2	Rodolfo Bellato	Draw (majority)	UFC 312	February 9, 2025	3	5:00	Sydney, Australia	
Loss	12–4–1	Alonzo Menifield	Submission (guillotine choke)	UFC 290	July 8, 2023	2	1:55	Las Vegas, Nevada, United States	
Draw	12–3–1	Alonzo Menifield	Draw (majority)	UFC 284	February 12, 2023	3	5:00	Perth, Australia	Menifield was deducted one point in round 3 due to grabbing the fence.
Loss	12–3	Jamahal Hill	KO (punches)	UFC on ESPN: Font vs. Aldo	December 4, 2021	1	0:48	Las Vegas, Nevada, United States	
Loss	12–2	Anthony Smith	TKO (doctor stoppage)	UFC 261	April 24, 2021	1	5:00	Jacksonville, Florida, United States	
Win	12–1	Modestas Bukauskas	KO (punches)	UFC Fight Night: Ortega vs. The Korean Zombie	October 18, 2020	1	2:01	Abu Dhabi, United Arab Emirates	Performance of the Night.
Win	11–1	Michał Oleksiejczuk	Submission (kimura)	UFC Fight Night: Felder vs. Hooker	February 23, 2020	1	3:29	Auckland, New Zealand	Performance of the Night.
Loss	10–1	Misha Cirkunov	Submission (Peruvian necktie)	UFC Fight Night: Cowboy vs. Gaethje	September 14, 2019	1	3:38	Vancouver, British Columbia, Canada	
Win	10–0	Sam Alvey	TKO (punches)	UFC 234	February 10, 2019	1	2:49	Melbourne, Australia	
Win	9–0	Paul Craig	Submission (kimura)	UFC Fight Night: dos Santos vs. Tuivasa	December 2, 2018	3	4:51	Adelaide, Australia	
Win	8–0	Chris Birchler	TKO (punches)	Dana White's Contender Series 14	July 24, 2018	1	4:23	Las Vegas, Nevada, United States	
Win	7–0	Kim Doo-hwan	Decision (unanimous)	Hex Fight Series 13	March 23, 2018	5	5:00	Melbourne, Australia	Defended the Hex Light Heavyweight Championship.
Win	6–0	Steven Warby	Decision (unanimous)	Hex Fight Series 12	November 24, 2017	5	5:00	Melbourne, Australia	Defended the Hex Light Heavyweight Championship.
Win	5–0	Benjamin Kelleher	Submission (arm-triangle choke)	Hex Fight Series 9	June 23, 2017	1	1:23	Melbourne, Australia	Won the inaugural Hex Light Heavyweight Championship.
Win	4–0	Nathan Reddy	TKO (punches)	Hex Fight Series 8	March 31, 2017	1	4:59	Melbourne, Australia	
Win	3–0	Matt Eland	TKO (punches and elbows)	Hex Fight Series 7	December 2, 2016	1	2:55	Melbourne, Australia	
Win	2–0	Mike Turner	Decision (unanimous)	Hex Fight Series 6	June 24, 2016	3	5:00	Melbourne, Australia	
Win	1–0	Benjamin Kelleher	Submission (armbar)	Hex Fight Series 5	February 20, 2016	1	4:01	Melbourne, Australia	Light Heavyweight debut.

== See also ==
- List of current UFC fighters
- List of Dana White's Contender Series alumni
- List of male mixed martial artists
