= Paul Craig =

Scottish mixed martial arts fighter

- Born: Paul Lindsey Craig; 27 November 1987 (age 38); Airdrie, Lanarkshire, Scotland
- Other names: Bearjew
- Height: 6 ft 4 in (1.93 m)
- Weight: 185 lb (84 kg; 13.2 st)
- Division: Light heavyweight Middleweight
- Reach: 76 in (193 cm)
- Fighting out of: Coatbridge, Scotland
- Team: Higher Level Martial Arts
- Rank: Black belt in Brazilian Jiu-Jitsu under Brian Gallacher
- Years active: 2013–2025

Kickboxing record
- Total: 1
- Wins: 1
- Losses: 0
- Draws: 0

Mixed martial arts record
- Total: 29
- Wins: 17
- By knockout: 4
- By submission: 13
- Losses: 10
- By knockout: 6
- By submission: 2
- By decision: 2
- Draws: 1
- No contests: 1

Amateur record
- Total: 3
- Wins: 3
- By submission: 3

Other information
- Mixed martial arts record from Sherdog

Paul Lindsey Craig (born 27 November 1987) is a Scottish former mixed martial artist who competed in the Middleweight and Light heavyweight division of the Ultimate Fighting Championship (UFC). A professional from 2013 to 2025, Craig formerly competed for BAMMA, where he was the BAMMA World Light Heavyweight Champion. He holds wins over former UFC champions Maurício Rua, Magomed Ankalaev and Jamahal Hill.

== Mixed martial arts career ==
=== Early career ===
Craig's head coach took him from no martial arts experience to 8–0 as an amateur, with each of his wins coming via first-round stoppage. As a professional, Craig went 8–0 over four years before being signed by the UFC.

In November 2014, Craig won a K1-rules fight in Germany.

Craig won the BAMMA World Light heavyweight Championship at BAMMA 23 when he defeated Marcin Lazarz by submission. He was set to defend his title against Chris Fields in Dublin, although the fight was postponed following the death of Portuguese fighter João Carvalho. The match up was rescheduled, but failed to take place due to Craig's damaging his ankle ligaments. Craig did not end up defending the title, as he signed a 4-fight deal with the UFC.

=== Ultimate Fighting Championship ===
Craig made his promotional debut against Luis Henrique da Silva on 17 December 2016, at UFC on Fox: VanZant vs. Waterson. He won the fight via submission in round 2 and was awarded a Performance of the Night bonus.

Craig faced Tyson Pedro on 4 March 2017, at UFC 209. He lost the bout via first-round TKO.

Craig faced Khalil Rountree at UFC Fight Night: Nelson vs. Ponzinibbio on 16 July 2017. He lost the fight via knockout in the first round.

Craig faced Magomed Ankalaev on 17 March 2018, at UFC Fight Night 127. He won the fight via submission at 4:59 in Round 3, resulting in the latest submission finish in a 3-round fight in UFC history. He was also awarded a Performance of the Night bonus.

Following the win against Ankalaev, Craig signed a new, four-fight contract with UFC.

Craig faced promotional newcomer Jimmy Crute on 2 December 2018, at UFC Fight Night 142. He lost the fight via kimura in the third round.

Craig faced promotional newcomer Kennedy Nzechukwu on 30 March 2019, at UFC on ESPN 2. He won the fight via submission due to a triangle choke in the third round. This win earned him the Performance of the Night award.

Craig faced Alonzo Menifield on 29 June 2019, at UFC on ESPN: Ngannou vs. dos Santos. He lost the fight via knockout in the first round.

Craig faced Vinicius Moreira on 21 September 2019, at UFC Fight Night 159. He won the fight via a rear-naked choke submission in the first round. This win earn Craig his fourth Performance of the Night award.

Craig stepped in on short notice to face Maurício Rua on 16 November 2019, at UFC Fight Night 164, replacing Sam Alvey, who had withdrawn from the bout due to a broken hand. After three rounds, the back-and-forth fight was declared a split draw.

Craig was expected to face Ryan Spann on 21 March 2020, at UFC Fight Night: Woodley vs. Edwards. However, the event was cancelled.

Craig faced Gadzhimurad Antigulov on 26 July 2020, at UFC on ESPN 14. He won the fight via submission in round one. This win earned him the Performance of the Night award.

Craig faced Maurício Rua in a rematch on 21 November 2020, at UFC 255. He won the fight via technical knockout in round two.

Craig was scheduled to face Jamahal Hill on 20 March 2021, at UFC on ESPN 21. However, on 10 March, Hill withdrew from the bout after testing positive for COVID-19. The match was rescheduled for 12 June 2021, at UFC 263. Craig won the bout via TKO in round one after snapping Hill's elbow with an armbar. This win earned him the Performance of the Night award.

Craig was scheduled to face Alexander Gustafsson on 4 September 2021, at UFC Fight Night 191. However, a week before the event, Gustafsson withdrew due to injury.

Craig faced Nikita Krylov on 19 March 2022, at UFC Fight Night 204. He won the fight via a triangle choke in round one. With this win, he received the Performance of the Night award.

Craig faced Volkan Oezdemir on 23 July 2022, at UFC Fight Night 208. He lost the fight via unanimous decision.

Craig faced Johnny Walker on 21 January 2023, at UFC 283. He lost the fight via technical knockout in the first round.

==== Move to Middleweight ====
Moving down to the middleweight division, Craig faced André Muniz on 22 July 2023, at UFC Fight Night: Aspinall vs. Tybura. He won the fight via ground and pound TKO in the second round. With this win, he received his eighth Performance of the Night bonus award.

Craig faced Brendan Allen on 18 November 2023, at UFC Fight Night: Allen vs. Craig. He lost the fight via a rear-naked choke submission in the third round.

Craig faced Caio Borralho on 4 May 2024, at UFC 301. He lost the fight by knockout in the second round.

Craig faced Bo Nickal on 16 November 2024, at UFC 309. He lost the fight by unanimous decision.

==== Return to Light Heavyweight ====
Craig was scheduled to make his return to the light heavyweight division against former interim LFA Light Heavyweight Champion Rodolfo Bellato on 17 May 2025, at UFC Fight Night 256. However, on the day of the event, it was announced that the bout was cancelled as a result of Bellato's medical issue relating to a herpes infection but the bout was rescheduled to 14 June 2025, at UFC on ESPN 69. The bout was ruled a no-contest after Craig hit Bellato with an illegal upkick at the end of the first round.

Craig faced Modestas Bukauskas on 6 September 2025 at UFC Fight Night 258. He lost the fight by knockout via an elbow at the end of the first round and announced his retirement from mixed martial arts after the fight.

== Brazilian Jiu-Jitsu ==
Paul Craig is also a Brazilian jiu-jitsu practitioner who competes in the Absolute, Middleweight, Heavyweight and Super Heavyweight divisions.

Craig won the gold medal on the Absolute division at the Scottish Grappling Challenge 4 in No Gi in 2012.

He took part in the 2013 Scottish BJJ Nationals, taking 1st place in the Advanced 97.5 kg Division. Craig was also in the 2013 Scotia Cup Winter Leg, taking 1st place in both Purple Belt Super Heavyweight and Purple Belt Absolute Divisions.

Craig competed in the 2015 British Pro Jiu Jitsu Championship, taking 1st place in the Purple Belt 95+ kg Division and qualifying for the Abu Dhabi World Professional Jiu-Jitsu Championship. He also took 3rd place in the Absolute Purple 75+ kg Division.

In June 2016, he won his classe in Gi and No Gi at Empire Grappling.

After defeating Jamahal Hill in 2021, Craig was promoted to black belt.

On 27 August 2022, Craig defeated Sam Sweeney in a tough, back and forth sub only grappling match at Holytown Havoc 2.

On 24 September 2022, Craig faced Jed Hue in the main event of Polaris 21. Craig was submitted with an ankle-lock in 21 seconds.

== Professional wrestling ==
=== Insane Championship Wrestling ===
Craig performs as a professional wrestler. During his career, he has worked for Insane Championship Wrestling where he is a one-time ICW Tag Team Champion with Chris Bungard.

== Personal life ==
Craig has two daughters, he worked at a factory to support his fighting career before becoming a full-time professional.

Paul played football before becoming an MMA fighter. He also worked as a football coach before becoming a teacher for an educational charity. Paul hosts a podcast called Leather'd, with fellow Scottish MMA fighter Ross Cooper.

== Championships and accomplishments ==
=== Mixed martial arts ===
- Ultimate Fighting Championship
  - Performance of the Night (Eight times) vs. Henrique da Silva, Magomed Ankalaev, Kennedy Nzechukwu, Vinicius Moreira, Gadzhimurad Antigulov, Jamahal Hill, Nikita Krylov, and André Muniz
    - Third most Performance of the Night bonuses in UFC history (8) (behind Charles Oliveira and Kevin Holland)
    - Fifth most Post-Fight bonuses in UFC Light Heavyweight division history (7)
  - Second most submission wins in the UFC Light Heavyweight division history (6) (behind Glover Teixeira)
  - Most triangle-choke submission wins in UFC history (4)
  - Tied (Stephan Bonnar) for third most submission attempts in UFC Light Heavyweight division history (13)
  - Tied (Mauricio Rua, Anthony Smith & Nikita Krylov) for fifth most finishes in UFC Light Heavyweight division history (8)
  - Latest submission/finish in a three-round Light Heavyweight bout (4:59 in R3) (vs. Magomed Ankalaev)
  - UFC.com Awards
    - 2018 Half-Year Awards: Best Submission of the 1HY & Ranked #2 Submission of the Year vs. Magomed Ankalaev
    - 2019: Ranked #7 Submission of the Year vs. Kennedy Nzechukwu
    - 2022: Ranked #6 Submission of the Year vs. Nikita Krylov
- BAMMA
  - BAMMA World Light heavyweight Championship (One time)
- MMA Junkie
  - 2019 March Submission of the Month vs. Kennedy Nzechukwu
- Cageside Press
  - 2018 Submission of the Year vs. Magomed Ankalaev at UFC Fight Night: Werdum vs. Volkov
- Jitsmagazine
  - 2022 MMA Submission of the Year vs. Nikita Krylov at UFC on ESPN+ 62.

=== Professional wrestling ===
- Insane Championship Wrestling
  - ICW Tag Team Championship (1 time) - with Chris Bungard

== Mixed martial arts record ==
Professional record breakdown
| 29 matches | 17 wins | 10 losses |
| By knockout | 4 | 6 |
| By submission | 13 | 2 |
| By decision | 0 | 2 |
| Draws | 1 | |
| No contests | 1 | |

| Res. | Record | Opponent | Method | Event | Date | Round | Time | Location | Notes |
|---|---|---|---|---|---|---|---|---|---|
| Loss | 17–10–1 (1) | Modestas Bukauskas | KO (elbow) | UFC Fight Night: Imavov vs. Borralho | 6 September 2025 | 1 | 5:00 | Paris, France | |
| NC | 17–9–1 (1) | Rodolfo Bellato | NC (illegal upkick) | UFC on ESPN: Usman vs. Buckley | 14 June 2025 | 1 | 4:59 | Atlanta, Georgia, United States | Return to Light Heavyweight. An accidental illegal upkick rendered Bellato unable to continue. |
| Loss | 17–9–1 | Bo Nickal | Decision (unanimous) | UFC 309 | 16 November 2024 | 3 | 5:00 | New York City, New York, United States | |
| Loss | 17–8–1 | Caio Borralho | KO (punches) | UFC 301 | 4 May 2024 | 2 | 2:10 | Rio de Janeiro, Brazil | |
| Loss | 17–7–1 | Brendan Allen | Submission (rear-naked choke) | UFC Fight Night: Allen vs. Craig | 18 November 2023 | 3 | 0:38 | Las Vegas, Nevada, United States | |
| Win | 17–6–1 | André Muniz | TKO (elbows) | UFC Fight Night: Aspinall vs. Tybura | 22 July 2023 | 2 | 4:40 | London, England | Middleweight debut. Performance of the Night. |
| Loss | 16–6–1 | Johnny Walker | TKO (punches) | UFC 283 | 21 January 2023 | 1 | 2:16 | Rio de Janeiro, Brazil | |
| Loss | 16–5–1 | Volkan Oezdemir | Decision (unanimous) | UFC Fight Night: Blaydes vs. Aspinall | 23 July 2022 | 3 | 5:00 | London, England | |
| Win | 16–4–1 | Nikita Krylov | Submission (triangle choke) | UFC Fight Night: Volkov vs. Aspinall | 19 March 2022 | 1 | 3:57 | London, England | Performance of the Night. |
| Win | 15–4–1 | Jamahal Hill | TKO (elbows and punches) | UFC 263 | 12 June 2021 | 1 | 1:59 | Glendale, Arizona, United States | Performance of the Night. |
| Win | 14–4–1 | Maurício Rua | TKO (submission to punches) | UFC 255 | 21 November 2020 | 2 | 3:36 | Las Vegas, Nevada, United States | |
| Win | 13–4–1 | Gadzhimurad Antigulov | Submission (triangle choke) | UFC on ESPN: Whittaker vs. Till | 26 July 2020 | 1 | 2:06 | Abu Dhabi, United Arab Emirates | Performance of the Night. |
| Draw | 12–4–1 | Maurício Rua | Draw (split) | UFC Fight Night: Błachowicz vs. Jacaré | 16 November 2019 | 3 | 5:00 | São Paulo, Brazil | |
| Win | 12–4 | Vinicius Moreira | Submission (rear-naked choke) | UFC Fight Night: Rodríguez vs. Stephens | 21 September 2019 | 1 | 3:19 | Mexico City, Mexico | Performance of the Night. |
| Loss | 11–4 | Alonzo Menifield | KO (punches) | UFC on ESPN: Ngannou vs. dos Santos | 29 June 2019 | 1 | 3:19 | Minneapolis, Minnesota, United States | |
| Win | 11–3 | Kennedy Nzechukwu | Submission (triangle choke) | UFC on ESPN: Barboza vs. Gaethje | 30 March 2019 | 3 | 4:20 | Philadelphia, Pennsylvania, United States | Nzechukwu was deducted one point in round 3 due to repeated eye pokes. Performance of the Night. |
| Loss | 10–3 | Jimmy Crute | Submission (kimura) | UFC Fight Night: dos Santos vs. Tuivasa | 2 December 2018 | 3 | 4:51 | Adelaide, Australia | |
| Win | 10–2 | Magomed Ankalaev | Submission (triangle choke) | UFC Fight Night: Werdum vs. Volkov | 17 March 2018 | 3 | 4:59 | London, England | Performance of the Night. |
| Loss | 9–2 | Khalil Rountree Jr. | KO (punches) | UFC Fight Night: Nelson vs. Ponzinibbio | 16 July 2017 | 1 | 4:56 | Glasgow, Scotland | |
| Loss | 9–1 | Tyson Pedro | TKO (elbows) | UFC 209 | 4 March 2017 | 1 | 4:10 | Las Vegas, Nevada, United States | |
| Win | 9–0 | Henrique da Silva | Submission (armbar) | UFC on Fox: VanZant vs. Waterson | 17 December 2016 | 2 | 1:59 | Sacramento, California, United States | Performance of the Night. |
| Win | 8–0 | Marcin Łazarz | Submission (triangle choke) | BAMMA 23 | 14 November 2015 | 1 | 3:51 | London, England | Won the BAMMA World Light Heavyweight Championship. |
| Win | 7–0 | Karl Moore | Submission (guillotine choke) | BAMMA 22 | 19 September 2015 | 2 | 0:48 | Dublin, Ireland | |
| Win | 6–0 | Adam Wright | Submission (armbar) | Animalistic MMA: Rise of the Alpha | 20 June 2015 | 1 | 0:47 | Preston, England | |
| Win | 5–0 | Andrzej Bachorz | Submission (brabo choke) | FightStar Championship 5 | 11 April 2015 | 1 | 2:37 | Coventry, England | Won the vacant FightStar Light Heavyweight Championship. |
| Win | 4–0 | Dan Konecke | TKO (punches) | First Fighting Championship: Resurgence | 13 September 2014 | 1 | 4:18 | Hamilton, Scotland | |
| Win | 3–0 | Jon Ferguson | Submission (triangle choke) | Full Contact Contender 10 | 21 June 2014 | 1 | 1:50 | Bolton, England | |
| Win | 2–0 | Antonio Braga | Submission (triangle choke) | Underdog Xtreme Championships 2 | 1 March 2014 | 1 | 2:41 | Belfast, Northern Ireland | |
| Win | 1–0 | Brad Conway | Submission (triangle choke) | First Fighting Championship: Prepare for Glory 3 | 24 August 2013 | 1 | 2:00 | Hamilton, Scotland | Light Heavyweight debut. |

| Amateur record breakdown | | |
| 3 matches | 3 wins | 0 losses |
| By submission | 3 | 0 |

| Res. | Record | Opponent | Method | Event | Date | Round | Time | Location | Notes |
|---|---|---|---|---|---|---|---|---|---|
| Win | 3–0 | Jeff Metcalfe | Submission (guillotine choke) | Supremacy Fight Challenge 8 | 11 November 2012 | 1 | 0:46 | Gateshead, England | |
| Win | 2–0 | Paul Bradshaw | Submission (triangle choke) | Total Combat 50 | 6 October 2012 | 1 | 2:41 | Sunderland, England | |
| Win | 1–0 | Gary Sivills | Submission (armbar) | Total Combat 48 | 21 July 2012 | 1 | 1:26 | Sunderland, England | |

== See also ==
- List of male mixed martial artists
