= Nikita Krylov =

Russian mixed martial artist (born 1992)

- Born: Nikita Andreyevich Krylov; March 7, 1992 (age 34); Krasnyi Luch, Luhansk, Ukraine
- Other names: The Miner
- Nationality: Russian
- Height: 6 ft 3 in (1.91 m)
- Weight: 215 lb (98 kg; 15.4 st)
- Division: Heavyweight; Light Heavyweight
- Reach: 77 1/2 in (197 cm)
- Fighting out of: Kislovodsk, Russia
- Team: Vale Tudo MMA Academy; YK Promotion; Fight Club number one (formerly)
- Rank: Master of Sports of Ukraine and first degree black belt in Kyokushin Karate; Master of Sports of Ukraine in Hand-to-Hand Combat; Master of Sports in Submission Fighting
- Years active: 2012–present

Mixed martial arts record
- Total: 44
- Wins: 31
- By knockout: 13
- By submission: 16
- By decision: 2
- Losses: 13
- By knockout: 5
- By submission: 6
- By decision: 2

Other information
- Mixed martial arts record from Sherdog

Nikita Andreyevich Krylov (Note: Russian: Никита Андреевич Крылов Ukrainian: Микита Андрійович Крилов, romanized: Mykyta Andriyovych Krylov) (born March 7, 1992) is a Ukrainian-born Russian professional mixed martial artist. He currently competes in the Light Heavyweight division of the Ultimate Fighting Championship (UFC). A professional since 2012, Krylov has also competed for M-1 Global.

== Background ==
Krylov was born into an ethnic Russian family from Krasnyi Luch in Ukraine. He originally began training in Kyokushin karate at the age of ten, as his father had been a successful competitor in the sport himself. Krylov made the transition into mixed martial arts in 2012.

== Mixed martial arts career ==
=== Early career ===
Krylov made his debut on July 27, 2012, at West Fight 4 in Donetsk, Ukraine, defeating Alexander Umrikhin via TKO. He won eleven more fights in the next five months (10 submissions, 1 TKO), before losing via submission to Vladimir Mishchenko on December 29 at Oplot Challenge 22. After two quick wins in a Gladiators Fighting Challenge tournament in Donetsk on January 19, 2013, he rematched Mishchenko on March 8 at Oplot Challenge 40, and again being submitted by an arm-triangle choke. A month later, he defeated Gabriel Tampu by TKO at M-1 Challenge 38 in St. Petersburg, Russia.

=== Ultimate Fighting Championship ===
With a record of 15–2, Krylov was signed by the UFC and made his debut on August 31, 2013, at UFC 164 against Soa Palelei. He lost via third-round TKO in a lackluster fight that saw both fighters exhausted after the first round. Krylov blamed his fatigue on nervousness and a long trip from Donetsk to Milwaukee.

Krylov returned on January 25, 2014, in the opening bout of UFC on Fox 7, against Walt Harris. He scored a 25-second TKO victory via head kick and follow-up punches.

Following the win, Krylov told reporters he was considering dropping down to the light heavyweight division for his next bout.

For his first fight at light heavyweight, Krylov replaced Thiago Silva against Ovince Saint Preux on March 15, 2015, at UFC 171. He was choked unconscious in the first round by a Von Flue choke while attempting a guillotine.

Krylov faced Cody Donovan on July 19, 2014, at UFC Fight Night 46. He won the fight by TKO in the final seconds of the first round.

Next he fought Stanislav Nedkov on January 24, 2015, at UFC on Fox 14. He won the fight by submission due to a standing guillotine choke just over a minute into the first round.

Krylov was briefly linked to a bout with Marcos Rogério de Lima on June 20, 2015, at UFC Fight Night 69. However, the pairing was booked to take place a week later at UFC Fight Night 70. Subsequently, Lima was removed from the card on June 19, after visa issues restricted his entry to the United States. The bout with Lima was scheduled for a third time and took place on August 23, 2015, at UFC Fight Night 74. After surviving two guillotine attempts from Lima, Krylov won the fight by submission due to a rear-naked choke halfway through the first round.

Krylov was briefly linked to a matchup with Jimi Manuwa on February 27, 2016, at UFC Fight Night 84. However, Manuwa was scratched from the contest with an undisclosed injury in late December and the bout cancelled.

Krylov faced Francimar Barroso on May 8, 2016, at UFC Fight Night 87. Krylov won the fight via submission in the second round.

Krylov faced Ed Herman on July 30, 2016, at UFC 201. After a dominating first round for Krylov, he won the fight by knockout due to a head kick 40 seconds into the second.

Krylov next faced Misha Cirkunov on December 10, 2016, at UFC 206. He lost the fight via submission in the first round.

On February 17, 2017, it was reported, surprisingly to some, that Krylov had been released from the UFC. Krylov himself later explained his departure from the organization, saying that he had chosen to not re-sign his contract. He said that he liked to compete elsewhere to better his skills and be able to fight closer to his home in Ukraine.

=== Eurasia Fight Nights/Fight Nights Global ===
Following his UFC stint, Krylov signed a multi-fight contract with the Eurasia Fight Nights (EFN)/Fight Nights Global promotion.

He was set to make his promotional debut against former Bellator Light heavyweight Champion Emanuel Newton on June 2, 2017, at Fight Nights Global 68. However, Newton was later scrapped from the card and replaced by Stjepan Bekavac. Krylov won the fight by submission due to a guillotine choke, 53 seconds into the first round.

Next, he fought outside of his new promotion when he took on Maro Perak on August 26, 2017, for the Donbass Association of Combat Sports promotion. Krylov won the fight by TKO at the beginning of the second round.

Back in Fight Nights Global, Krylov got rescheduled against former Bellator Light heavyweight Champion Emanuel Newton on October 13, 2017, at Fight Nights Global 77. He won the fight by knockout from a knee, 43 seconds into the first round.

Krylov challenged for the FNG light heavyweight title against champion and fellow former UFC fighter Fabio Maldonado on May 19, 2018, at Fight Nights Global 87. He won the fight via knockout in the second round.

=== UFC return ===
In late June 2018, Fight Nights Global president Kamil Gadzhiev announced that the promotion has released Krylov from his contract in order to allow him to negotiate a new contract with the UFC.

Krylov faced Jan Błachowicz on September 15, 2018, at UFC Fight Night 136. He lost the fight via submission in the second round.

Krylov faced Ovince Saint Preux, in a rematch, on April 13, 2019, at UFC 236. He won the fight via a submission due to a rear-naked choke in round two.

Krylov faced Glover Teixeira on September 14, 2019, at UFC Fight Night 158. He lost the back-and-forth fight via split decision, the first decision loss in his 32-fight career.

Krylov faced Johnny Walker on March 14, 2020, at UFC Fight Night 170. He won the fight via unanimous decision.

Krylov was expected to face Volkan Oezdemir on October 18, 2020, at UFC Fight Night 180. However, Oezdemir pulled out of the fight in early October citing a knee injury. A replacement could not be found, so Krylov was removed from the card.

Krylov faced Magomed Ankalaev on February 27, 2021, at UFC Fight Night 186. He lost the fight via unanimous decision.

Krylov faced Paul Craig on March 19, 2022, at UFC Fight Night 204. He lost the fight via a triangle choke in round one.

Krylov faced Alexander Gustafsson on July 23, 2022, at UFC Fight Night 208. He won the fight via knockout in the first round. This win earned him the Performance of the Night award.

Krylov faced Volkan Oezdemir on October 22, 2022, at UFC 280. He won the bout via unanimous decision.

Krylov was scheduled to face Ryan Spann on February 25, 2023, at UFC Fight Night 220. However, the day of the event, Krylov fell ill and the main event was cancelled and the pair was rescheduled to meet at UFC Fight Night 221 two weeks later. He won the fight via a triangle choke submission in the first round.

Krylov was scheduled to face Azamat Murzakanov on November 16, 2024 at UFC 309. However, Murzakanov withdrew from the fight for unknown reasons.

Krylov faced former UFC Light Heavyweight title challenger Dominick Reyes on April 12, 2025 at UFC 314. He lost the fight by knockout in the first round after being dropped by a left, straight punch.

Krylov faced Bogdan Guskov on July 26, 2025 at UFC on ABC 9. He lost the fight by technical knockout in the first round.

Krylov faced Modestas Bukauskas on January 24, 2026 at UFC 324. He won the fight via knockout in the round three.

Krylov faced Robert Whittaker on July 11, 2026, at UFC 329. He lost the fight by technical knockout in the third round.

Krylov faced Abdul-Rakhman Yakhyaev on October 24, 2026 at UFC 333. He lost the fight by technical knockout via a knee and punches in the first round.

== Personal life ==
Krylov is enrolled at Donetsk Law Institute, and his heroes are Ilya Mate, Igor Vovchanchyn and Al Capone, after whom he was nicknamed and modeled his gimmick. Before his fight against Francimar Barroso, he changed his nickname from "Al Capone" to "The Miner" out of respect to his hometown (Donetsk), which consisted of many occupational miners.

Krylov is an open supporter of Donbass separatism, and has stated that if the Luhansk People's Republic ever received international recognition as a state, he would be the first in line for a passport. Whilst training in Kyiv, Krylov wore a uniform bearing the Russian flag, despite the war between the countries. This led to him being shunned from the gym, with members calling for action to be taken against him. Shortly thereafter, he relocated to Moscow and subsequently acquired Russian citizenship.

== Championships and accomplishments ==
=== Mixed martial arts ===
- Ultimate Fighting Championship
  - Performance of the Night (One time) vs. Alexander Gustafsson
  - Tied (Mauricio Rua, Paul Craig & Anthony Smith) for fifth most finishes in UFC Light Heavyweight division history (8)
  - Second latest knockout/finish in a three-round Light Heavyweight bout (4:57 in R3) (vs. Modestas Bukauskas)
- Fight Nights Global
  - FNG Light heavyweight Championship (One time)
- Gladiators FC
  - GFC 2 Heavyweight Tournament Winner

== Mixed martial arts record ==
Professional record breakdown
44 matches	31 wins	13 losses
By knockout	13	5
By submission	16	6
By decision	2	2

Res.	Record	Opponent	Method	Event	Date	Round	Time	Location	Notes
Loss	31–13	Abdul-Rakhman Yakhyaev	TKO (knee and punches)	UFC 333	October 24, 2026	1	2:38	Abu Dhabi, United Arab Emirates	
Loss	31–12	Robert Whittaker	TKO (jaw injury)	UFC 329	July 11, 2026	3	1:01	Las Vegas, Nevada, United States	
Win	31–11	Modestas Bukauskas	KO (punches)	UFC 324	January 24, 2026	3	4:57	Las Vegas, Nevada, United States	
Loss	30–11	Bogdan Guskov	KO (punches)	UFC on ABC: Whittaker vs. de Ridder	July 26, 2025	1	4:18	Abu Dhabi, United Arab Emirates	
Loss	30–10	Dominick Reyes	KO (punch)	UFC 314	April 12, 2025	1	2:24	Miami, Florida, United States	
Win	30–9	Ryan Spann	Submission (triangle choke)	UFC Fight Night: Yan vs. Dvalishvili	March 11, 2023	1	3:38	Las Vegas, Nevada, United States	Catchweight (215 lb) bout.
Win	29–9	Volkan Oezdemir	Decision (unanimous)	UFC 280	October 22, 2022	3	5:00	Abu Dhabi, United Arab Emirates	
Win	28–9	Alexander Gustafsson	KO (punches)	UFC Fight Night: Blaydes vs. Aspinall	July 23, 2022	1	1:07	London, England	Performance of the Night.
Loss	27–9	Paul Craig	Submission (triangle choke)	UFC Fight Night: Volkov vs. Aspinall	March 19, 2022	1	3:57	London, England	
Loss	27–8	Magomed Ankalaev	Decision (unanimous)	UFC Fight Night: Rozenstruik vs. Gane	February 27, 2021	3	5:00	Las Vegas, Nevada, United States	
Win	27–7	Johnny Walker	Decision (unanimous)	UFC Fight Night: Lee vs. Oliveira	March 14, 2020	3	5:00	Brasília, Brazil	
Loss	26–7	Glover Teixeira	Decision (split)	UFC Fight Night: Cowboy vs. Gaethje	September 14, 2019	3	5:00	Vancouver, British Columbia, Canada	
Win	26–6	Ovince Saint Preux	Submission (rear-naked choke)	UFC 236	April 13, 2019	2	2:30	Atlanta, Georgia, United States	
Loss	25–6	Jan Błachowicz	Submission (arm-triangle choke)	UFC Fight Night: Hunt vs. Oleinik	September 15, 2018	2	2:41	Moscow, Russia	
Win	25–5	Fábio Maldonado	KO (punch)	Fight Nights Global 87	May 19, 2018	2	3:33	Rostov-on-Don, Russia	Won the FNG Light Heavyweight Championship.
Win	24–5	Emanuel Newton	KO (knee)	Fight Nights Global 77	October 13, 2017	1	0:43	Surgut, Russia	
Win	23–5	Maro Perak	TKO (punches)	United Donbass Cup 2017	August 26, 2017	2	0:36	Donetsk, Ukraine	
Win	22–5	Stjepan Bekavac	Submission (guillotine choke)	Fight Nights Global 68	June 2, 2017	1	0:53	Saint Petersburg, Russia	
Loss	21–5	Misha Cirkunov	Submission (guillotine choke)	UFC 206	December 10, 2016	1	4:38	Toronto, Ontario, Canada	
Win	21–4	Ed Herman	KO (head kick)	UFC 201	July 30, 2016	2	0:40	Atlanta, Georgia, United States	
Win	20–4	Francimar Barroso	Submission (rear-naked choke)	UFC Fight Night: Overeem vs. Arlovski	May 8, 2016	2	3:11	Rotterdam, Netherlands	
Win	19–4	Marcos Rogério de Lima	Submission (rear-naked choke)	UFC Fight Night: Holloway vs. Oliveira	August 23, 2015	1	2:29	Saskatoon, Saskatchewan, Canada	
Win	18–4	Stanislav Nedkov	Submission (standing guillotine choke)	UFC on Fox: Gustafsson vs. Johnson	January 24, 2015	1	1:24	Stockholm, Sweden	
Win	17–4	Cody Donovan	TKO (punches)	UFC Fight Night: McGregor vs. Brandão	July 19, 2014	1	4:57	Dublin, Ireland	
Loss	16–4	Ovince Saint Preux	Technical Submission (Von Flue choke)	UFC 171	March 15, 2014	1	1:29	Dallas, Texas, United States	Light Heavyweight debut.
Win	16–3	Walt Harris	TKO (head kick and punches)	UFC on Fox: Henderson vs. Thomson	January 25, 2014	1	0:25	Chicago, Illinois, United States	
Loss	15–3	Soa Palelei	TKO (punches)	UFC 164	August 31, 2013	3	1:34	Milwaukee, Wisconsin, United States	
Win	15–2	Gabriel Tampu	TKO (punches)	M-1 Challenge 38	April 9, 2013	1	4:27	Saint Petersburg, Russia	
Loss	14–2	Vladimir Mishchenko	Submission (arm-triangle choke)	Oplot Challenge 40	March 8, 2013	1	0:58	Kharkiv, Ukraine	
Win	14–1	Kylychbek Sarkarbaev	TKO (punches)	Gladiators FC 2	January 19, 2013	1	0:49	Donetsk, Ukraine	
Win	13–1	Julian Bogdanov	KO (punch)	Gladiators FC 2	January 19, 2013	1	1:17	Donetsk, Ukraine	
Loss	12–1	Vladimir Mishchenko	Submission (arm-triangle choke)	Oplot Challenge 22	December 29, 2012	1	1:47	Kharkiv, Ukraine	
Win	12–0	Denis Simkin	Submission (americana)	Gladiators FC 1	December 22, 2012	1	0:35	Donetsk, Ukraine	
Win	11–0	Valery Scherbakov	Submission (Achilles lock)	Warrior's Honor: Igor Vovchanchyn Cup 2	November 9, 2012	1	1:38	Kharkiv, Ukraine	
Win	10–0	Vladimir Gerasimchik	Submission (kimura)	Oplot Challenge 7	October 20, 2012	1	1:35	Kharkiv, Ukraine	
Win	9–0	Igor Kukurudziak	Submission (kimura)	European Combat Sambo Federation: Kolomyi Cup	October 13, 2012	1	2:47	Kolomyia, Ukraine	
Win	8–0	Viktor Smirnov	TKO (doctor stoppage)	European Combat Sambo Federation: MMA Lion Cup	October 2, 2012	1	0:12	Lviv, Ukraine	
Win	7–0	Anatoliy Didenko	Submission (Achilles lock)	Oplot Challenge 4	September 15, 2012	1	0:29	Kharkiv, Ukraine	
Win	6–0	Alexey Stepanov	Submission (rear-naked choke)	European Combat Sambo Federation: MMA Ukraine Cup 7	September 14, 2012	1	0:29	Donetsk, Ukraine	
Win	5–0	Svyatoslav Scherbakov	Submission (armbar)	European Combat Sambo Federation: MMA Ukraine Cup 6	August 26, 2012	1	1:44	Pervomaisk, Ukraine	
Win	4–0	Anatoliy Didenko	Submission (rear-naked choke)	European Combat Sambo Federation: MMA Ukraine Cup 5	August 18, 2012	1	2:08	Cherkassy, Ukraine	
Win	3–0	Alexey Artemenko	Submission (guillotine choke)	Big Boys Fights 1	August 16, 2012	1	2:20	Donetsk, Ukraine	
Win	2–0	Denis Bogdanov	Submission (rear-naked choke)	European Combat Sambo Federation: Cup of West Ukraine 2012	August 10, 2012	1	1:31	Truskavets, Ukraine	
Win	1–0	Alexander Umrikhin	TKO (punches)	Real Fight Promotion 6	July 27, 2012	1	0:56	Donetsk, Ukraine	

== See also ==
- List of current UFC fighters
- List of male mixed martial artists
