= Modestas Bukauskas =

British mixed martial arts fighter

- Born: 10 February 1994 (age 32); Klaipėda, Lithuania
- Other names: The Baltic Gladiator
- Nationality: Lithuanian • British
- Height: 6 ft 3 in (1.91 m)
- Weight: 205 lb (93 kg; 14 st 9 lb)
- Division: Light Heavyweight; Middleweight
- Reach: 78 in (198 cm)
- Fighting out of: Denham, Buckinghamshire, England
- Team: Gintas Combat
- Years active: 2015–present

Kickboxing record
- Total: 1
- Wins: 1

Mixed martial arts record
- Total: 28
- Wins: 21
- By knockout: 12
- By submission: 3
- By decision: 6
- Losses: 7
- By knockout: 5
- By submission: 1
- By decision: 1

Other information
- Mixed martial arts record from Sherdog

Modestas Bukauskas (born 10 February 1994) is a Lithuanian-British mixed martial artist who competes in the Light Heavyweight division of the Ultimate Fighting Championship (UFC). He is the former two-time Cage Warriors Light Heavyweight Champion. As of October 24, 2026, he is #15 in the Meta UFC light heavyweight rankings.

== Mixed martial arts career ==
=== Early career ===
Bukauskas, a four-time British Kickboxing Champion compiled a 10–2 record on the UK MMA scene, fighting mostly for the Cage Warriors promotion, where he won the Cage Warriors Light Heavyweight Championship by knocking out 7-time Norwegian national wrestling champion Marthin Hamlet in the fourth round at Cage Warriors 106. He then went on to defend his title at Cage Warriors 111 against Riccardo Nosiglia by knocking Nosiglia out with elbows to the head after Nosiglia tried for a takedown.

=== Ultimate Fighting Championship ===
Bukauskas was scheduled to face Vinicius Moreira at UFC on ESPN: Kattar vs. Ige on 16 July 2020. However, Moreira tested positive for COVID-19 on 3 July and was removed from the event. Moreira was replaced by Andreas Michailidis. He won the bout via TKO after Michailidis couldn't get up at the end of the round due to a series of elbows to the side of the head. Bukauskas in the process became the first Lithuanian to win in the UFC. This win earned him the Performance of the Night award.

Bukauskas faced Jimmy Crute on 18 October 2020 at UFC Fight Night: Ortega vs. The Korean Zombie. He lost the fight via knockout in round one.

Bukauskas faced Michał Oleksiejczuk on 27 March 2021, at UFC 260. He lost a close bout via split decision.

Bukauskas faced Khalil Rountree Jr. on 4 September 2021, at UFC Fight Night 191. He lost the fight via technical knockout in round two after Rountree side kicked his front leg causing an injury.

On 20 October 2021, it was announced that Bukauskas was no longer on the UFC roster.

=== Post UFC ===
In his first performance post UFC release, Bukauskas returned from a year layoff due to a knee surgery to defeat Lee Chadwick via unanimous decision on 4 November 2022, at Cage Warriors 145.

Bukauskas faced Chuck Campbell for the vacant Cage Warriors Light Heavyweight Championship on 31 December 2022, at Cage Warriors 148, knocking him out in the fourth round to regain the title.

=== Return to UFC ===
Bukauskas faced Tyson Pedro, replacing Zhang Mingyang, on 12 February 2023, at UFC 284. He won the fight via unanimous decision.

Bukauskas faced Zac Pauga on 17 June 2023 at UFC on ESPN 47. He won the close fight via unanimous decision. 11 out of 13 media outlets scored the bout in favor of Pauga.

Bukauskas faced Vitor Petrino on 4 November 2023 at UFC Fight Night 231. He lost the fight via knockout in the second round.

Bukauskas faced Marcin Prachnio on 27 July 2024, at UFC 304. He won the fight by an arm-triangle choke submission in the third round.

Bukauskas faced Raffael Cerqueira on 22 February 2025 at UFC Fight Night 252. He won the fight by knockout in the first round.

Bukauskas faced Ion Cutelaba on 10 May 2025 at UFC 315. He won the fight by split decision.

Bukauskas faced Paul Craig on 6 September 2025 at UFC Fight Night 258. He won the fight by knockout via an elbow at the end of the first round.

Bukauskas faced Nikita Krylov on 24 January 2026 at UFC 324. He lost the fight via knockout in round three.

Bukauskas was scheduled to face Rodolfo Bellato on 16 May 2026 at UFC Fight Night 276. However, Bellato pulled out during fight week for undisclosed reasons and was replaced by promotional newcomer Christian Edwards in a catchweight of 215 pounds. Bukauskas won the fight by split decision.

Bukauskas faced Oumar Sy on 5 September 2026, at UFC Fight Night 287. He won the fight by technical knockout via a knee and punches in the second round.

== Championships and achievements ==
=== Mixed martial arts ===
- Cage Warriors
  - Cage Warriors Light Heavyweight Championship (Two times)
    - One successful defense
- Ultimate Fighting Championship
  - Performance of the Night (One time) vs. Andreas Michailidis

== Mixed martial arts record ==
Professional record breakdown
28 matches	21 wins	7 losses
By knockout	12	5
By submission	3	1
By decision	6	1

Res.	Record	Opponent	Method	Event	Date	Round	Time	Location	Notes
Win	21–7	Oumar Sy	TKO (knee and punches)	UFC Fight Night: Hooker vs. Parnasse	5 September 2026	2	3:57	Paris, France	
Win	20–7	Christian Edwards	Decision (split)	UFC Fight Night: Allen vs. Costa	16 May 2026	3	5:00	Las Vegas, Nevada, United States	Catchweight (215 lb) bout.
Loss	19–7	Nikita Krylov	KO (punches)	UFC 324	24 January 2026	3	4:57	Las Vegas, Nevada, United States	
Win	19–6	Paul Craig	KO (elbow)	UFC Fight Night: Imavov vs. Borralho	6 September 2025	1	5:00	Paris, France	
Win	18–6	Ion Cutelaba	Decision (split)	UFC 315	10 May 2025	3	5:00	Montreal, Quebec, Canada	
Win	17–6	Raffael Cerqueira	KO (punches)	UFC Fight Night: Cejudo vs. Song	22 February 2025	1	2:12	Seattle, Washington, United States	
Win	16–6	Marcin Prachnio	Submission (arm-triangle choke)	UFC 304	27 July 2024	3	3:12	Manchester, England	
Loss	15–6	Vitor Petrino	KO (punch)	UFC Fight Night: Almeida vs. Lewis	4 November 2023	2	1:03	São Paulo, Brazil	
Win	15–5	Zac Pauga	Decision (unanimous)	UFC on ESPN: Vettori vs. Cannonier	17 June 2023	3	5:00	Las Vegas, Nevada, United States	
Win	14–5	Tyson Pedro	Decision (unanimous)	UFC 284	12 February 2023	3	5:00	Perth, Australia	
Win	13–5	Chuck Campbell	KO (punch)	Cage Warriors 148	31 December 2022	4	0:22	London, England	Won the vacant Cage Warriors Light Heavyweight Championship.
Win	12–5	Lee Chadwick	Decision (unanimous)	Cage Warriors 145	4 November 2022	3	5:00	London, England	
Loss	11–5	Khalil Rountree Jr.	TKO (leg kick)	UFC Fight Night: Brunson vs. Till	4 September 2021	2	2:30	Las Vegas, Nevada, United States	
Loss	11–4	Michał Oleksiejczuk	Decision (split)	UFC 260	27 March 2021	3	5:00	Las Vegas, Nevada, United States	
Loss	11–3	Jimmy Crute	KO (punches)	UFC Fight Night: Ortega vs. The Korean Zombie	18 October 2020	1	2:01	Abu Dhabi, United Arab Emirates	
Win	11–2	Andreas Michailidis	TKO (elbows)	UFC on ESPN: Kattar vs. Ige	16 July 2020	1	5:00	Abu Dhabi, United Arab Emirates	Performance of the Night.
Win	10–2	Riccardo Nosiglia	KO (elbows)	Cage Warriors 111	22 November 2019	1	3:51	London, England	Defended the Cage Warriors Light Heavyweight Championship.
Win	9–2	Marthin Hamlet	TKO (punches)	Cage Warriors 106	29 June 2019	4	3:56	London, England	Won the vacant Cage Warriors Light Heavyweight Championship.
Win	8–2	Marcin Wójcik	TKO (punches)	Cage Warriors 102	2 March 2019	2	4:09	London, England	
Win	7–2	Dan Konecke	TKO (punches)	FightStar Championship 16	15 December 2018	1	2:30	London, England	Won the FSC Light Heavyweight Championship.
Win	6–2	Kristian Lapsley	Technical Submission (rear-naked choke)	Cage Warriors 93	28 April 2018	1	2:39	Gothenburg, Sweden	
Win	5–2	Pelu Adetola	Submission (rear-naked choke)	Cage Warriors 92	24 March 2018	1	4:10	London, England	
Loss	4–2	John Redmond	TKO (punches)	Cage Warriors 77	8 July 2016	1	1:12	London, England	Middleweight bout.
Loss	4–1	Pavel Doroftei	Submission (heel hook)	Ultimate Challenge MMA 47	7 May 2016	1	0:18	London, England	Light Heavyweight debut. For the UCMMA Light Heavyweight Championship.
Win	4–0	Dave Rintoul	TKO (punches)	Too Much Talent 6	28 November 2015	1	4:17	Chertsey, England	
Win	3–0	Kes Mamba	TKO (punches)	Ultimate Challenge MMA 45	7 November 2015	2	1:03	London, England	
Win	2–0	Nelson Lima	TKO (punches)	Ultimate Challenge MMA 44	5 September 2015	2	2:14	London, England	
Win	1–0	Arvydas Juska	Decision (unanimous)	Ultimate Challenge MMA 43	2 May 2015	3	5:00	London, England	Middleweight debut.

== See also ==
- List of current UFC fighters
- List of male mixed martial artists
