= Maurício Ruffy =

Brazilian mixed martial artist

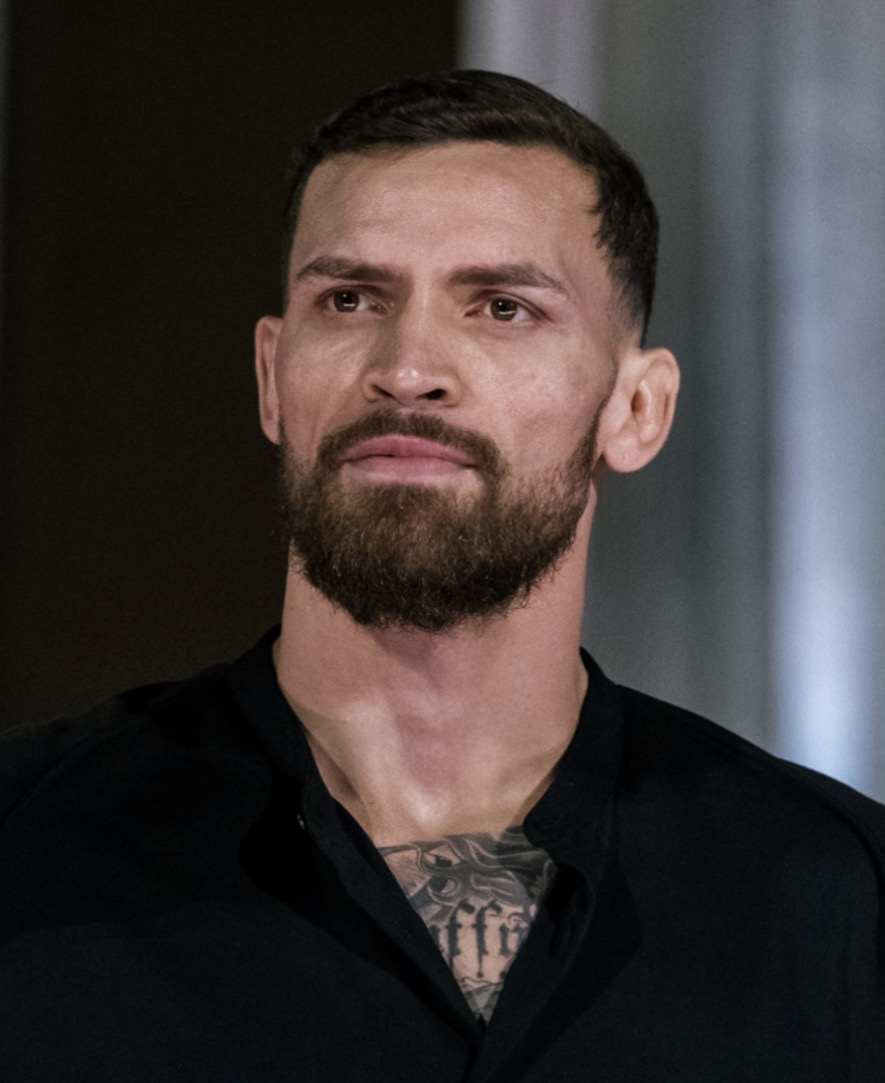
- Ruffy in 2026
- Born: Maurício de Lima Santos; June 17, 1996 (age 30); Coruripe, Alagoas, Brazil
- Height: 5 ft 11 in (1.80 m)
- Weight: 155 lb (70 kg; 11.1 st)
- Division: Lightweight
- Reach: 75 in (191 cm)
- Stance: Orthodox
- Fighting out of: São Paulo, Brazil
- Team: Fighting Nerds; Freestyle Fighting Gym
- Years active: 2016–present

Mixed martial arts record
- Total: 17
- Wins: 14
- By knockout: 13
- By decision: 1
- Losses: 3
- By knockout: 2
- By submission: 1

Other information
- Mixed martial arts record from Sherdog

Maurício de Lima Santos (born June 17, 1996), known as Maurício Ruffy, is a Brazilian mixed martial artist currently competing in the Lightweight division of the Ultimate Fighting Championship (UFC). As of June 20, 2026, he is #10 in the Meta UFC lightweight rankings.

== Mixed martial arts career ==
=== Early career ===
Ruffy acquired a record of 8–1 with eight knockouts competing exclusively on the Brazilian regional scene. This included a second-round knockout over UFC veteran Ronys Torres.

=== Dana White's Contender Series ===
Ruffy was then booked to compete on Week 9 of Season 7 of Dana White's Contender Series on October 3, 2023, against highly touted prospect Raimond Magomedaliev. He would win the fight via third-round technical knockout and was awarded a contract by Dana White.

=== Ultimate Fighting Championship ===
After earning his contract, Ruffy made his UFC debut at UFC 301 against Jamie Mullarkey on May 4, 2024. He would win the fight via technical knockout in the first round. This fight earned him a Performance of the Night award.

In his next fight, Ruffy was scheduled to face Charlie Campbell at UFC 309 on November 16, 2024. However, Campbell withdrew from the bout for undisclosed reasons and was subsequently replaced by James Llontop in a catchweight bout of 165 pounds. Llontop weighed in 1.2 lbs over the 165 lb catchweight limit and was fined 20 percent of his purse, which went to Ruffy. Ruffy would win the fight via unanimous decision, marking the first time he would go to the scorecards in his career.

Ruffy would then face King Green at UFC 313 on March 8, 2025. He would win the fight via first-round knockout with a spinning wheel kick. This fight earned him another Performance of the Night award.

Ruffy faced Benoît Saint Denis on September 6, 2025 at UFC Fight Night 258. He lost the fight via a face crank submission in the second round.

Ruffy faced Rafael Fiziev on February 1, 2026 at UFC 325. He won the fight by technical knockout in the second round. This fight earned him a $100,000 Performance of the Night award.

Ruffy faced former three-time Bellator Lightweight World Champion (also former UFC Lightweight Championship challenger) Michael Chandler on June 14, 2026 at UFC Freedom 250. He won the fight by technical knockout via a spinning wheel kick and punches in the first round.

Ruffy faced Arman Tsarukyan in the five-round co-main event on September 19, 2026 at UFC 331. He lost the fight by knockout via elbows in the first round.

== Personal life ==
Inspired by One Piece, the moniker of Ruffy (Note: Ruffy was what the character Luffy was called in the first translations of the One Piece manga into Portuguese.) was given to Maurício by his late brother before his first professional fight.

In 2025, Ruffy announced plans to expand his team, Fighting Nerds, by opening a new training facility in New Hampshire, to provide better facilities for his teammates and other athletes.

== Championships and accomplishments ==
- Ultimate Fighting Championship
  - Performance of the Night (Three times) vs. Jamie Mullarkey, King Green and Rafael Fiziev
  - Second most knockdowns-per-minute in UFC Lightweight division history (2.61)
  - UFC Honors Awards
    - 2025: President's Choice Performance of the Year Nominee & Fan's Choice Knockout of the Year Nominee vs. King Green
  - UFC.com Awards
    - 2024: Ranked #4 Newcomer of the Year
    - 2025: Ranked #2 Knockout of the Year vs. King Green
- Centurion Fight Championship
  - CFC Welterweight Tournament
- Mega Fight Championship
  - MFC Super Lightweight Championship
- ESPN
  - 2025 Knockout of the Year vs. King Green at UFC 313
- theScore
  - 2025 Knockout of the Year vs. King Green
- MMA Fighting
  - 2025 Knockout of the Year vs. King Green at UFC 313
- LowKick MMA
  - 2025 Knockout of the Year vs. King Green at UFC 313
- Bloody Elbow
  - 2025 #2 Ranked Knockout of the Year vs. King Green at UFC 313
- MMA Mania
  - 2025 #2 Ranked Knockout of the Year vs. King Green at UFC 313
- Uncrowned
  - 2025 #3 Ranked Knockout of the Year vs. King Green at UFC 313
- World MMA Awards
  - 2024–2025 Knockout of the Year vs. King Green at UFC 313

== Mixed martial arts record ==
Professional record breakdown
17 matches	14 wins	3 losses
By knockout	13	2
By submission	0	1
By decision	1	0

Res.	Record	Opponent	Method	Event	Date	Round	Time	Location	Notes
Loss	14–3	Arman Tsarukyan	KO (elbow)	UFC 331	September 19, 2026	1	4:56	Los Angeles, California, United States	
Win	14–2	Michael Chandler	TKO (spinning wheel kick and punches)	UFC Freedom 250	June 14, 2026	1	4:29	Washington, D.C., United States	
Win	13–2	Rafael Fiziev	TKO (punches)	UFC 325	February 1, 2026	2	4:30	Sydney, Australia	Performance of the Night.
Loss	12–2	Benoît Saint Denis	Submission (face crank)	UFC Fight Night: Imavov vs. Borralho	September 6, 2025	2	2:56	Paris, France	
Win	12–1	King Green	KO (spinning wheel kick)	UFC 313	March 8, 2025	1	2:07	Las Vegas, Nevada, United States	Performance of the Night.
Win	11–1	James Llontop	Decision (unanimous)	UFC 309	November 16, 2024	3	5:00	New York City, New York, United States	Catchweight (166.2 lb) bout; Llontop missed weight.
Win	10–1	Jamie Mullarkey	TKO (punches)	UFC 301	May 4, 2024	1	4:42	Rio de Janeiro, Brazil	Return to Lightweight. Performance of the Night.
Win	9–1	Raimond Magomedaliev	TKO (punches)	Dana White's Contender Series 65	October 3, 2023	3	4:45	Las Vegas, Nevada, United States	
Win	8–1	Ronys Torres	TKO (punches)	Centurion FC: Rex Redemptor	May 26, 2023	2	4:21	Rio de Janeiro, Brazil	Won the Centurion FC Welterweight Tournament.
Win	7–1	Corneliu Rotaru Lascar	TKO (punches)	Centurion FC: Rex Redemptor	May 26, 2023	1	4:23	Rio de Janeiro, Brazil	Welterweight debut. Centurion FC Welterweight Tournament Semifinal.
Win	6–1	Brenno Luiz Gonçalves	TKO (punch)	Arena Pride MMA 4	June 26, 2022	1	1:26	Santos, Brazil	
Loss	5–1	Manoel Sousa	KO (punches)	Standout Fighting Tournament 18	November 13, 2019	2	2:41	São Paulo, Brazil	Return to Lightweight.
Win	5–0	Derlan Marinho	KO (punches)	Mega Fight Championship 2	June 22, 2019	1	3:35	Osasco, Brazil	Super Lightweight debut. Won the MFC Super Lightweight Championship.
Win	4–0	Rafael Silva	TKO (punch)	Standout Fighting Tournament 8	December 15, 2018	2	1:08	São Paulo, Brazil	Catchweight (168 lb) bout.
Win	3–0	Lucas Costa Jesus	TKO (elbows)	Batalha MMA 13	June 30, 2018	1	1:42	Osasco, Brazil	
Win	2–0	Wendson Santos	TKO (punches)	Gold Fight 9	August 26, 2017	1	1:04	São Paulo, Brazil	
Win	1–0	Marlon Paula de Souza	TKO (punches)	Premium Fight Championship 6	September 18, 2016	1	0:30	São Paulo, Brazil	Lightweight debut.

== See also ==
- List of current UFC fighters
- List of Dana White's Contender Series alumni
- List of male mixed martial artists

== Notes ==
Awards
Preceded by Max Holloway def. Justin Gaethje	World MMA Knockout of the Year; July 1, 2024 – December 31, 2025 def. King Green at UFC 313	Incumbent
