= 2025 in UFC =

Mixed martial arts events

Information
- First date: January 13, 2025
- Last date: December 13, 2025

Events
- Total events: 42
- UFC: 13
- TUF Finale events: 2

Fights
- Total fights: 520
- Title fights: 21

Chronology
2024 in UFC	2025 in UFC	2026 in UFC

The year 2025 was the 33rd year in the history of the Ultimate Fighting Championship (UFC), a mixed martial arts promotion based in the United States.

== UFC in 2025 ==
=== Class action: anti-trust lawsuits ===
==== Le v. Zuffa ====
On August 9, 2023, U.S. District Judge Richard Boulware granted class action status to more than 1,200 former UFC fighters who competed between December 2010 and June 2017 and are suing for $800 million upward to $1.6 billion in wages, as the lawsuit claims Zuffa had abused its power to suppress UFC fighters' wages. The anti-trust law also permits private plaintiffs to be able to recover three times the damages suffered, meaning the UFC may ultimately pay several billions of dollars' worth of damages. The case has a scheduled April 8, 2024 trial date. On March 20, 2024, TKO, UFC parent company reached an agreement to settle all claims in the class action lawsuits for $335 million where the settlement amount will be deductible for tax purposes. However, on July 31, 2024, Judge Richard Boulware ruled that the case would be heard by a jury and denied the preliminary approval for a settlement and reset for trial of in October. On February 6, 2025, Judge Richard Boulware of Nevada granted final approval for a $375 million settlement in the "Le vs. Zuffa" antitrust lawsuit for monopolistic practices. As part of the settlement, around $240 million to $260 million will be distributed to eligible fighters, specifically those who competed in at least one UFC bout from December 2010 to June 2017. These payments are expected to be made over the next year. Additionally, $40 million from the settlement will be set aside for administrative and legal expenses.

==== Johnson v. Zuffa ====
Based on court filings from late July 2025, the Johnson v. Zuffa antitrust lawsuit, originally filed in 2021, is proceeding, and status conference for the case is scheduled for late August 2025.

==== Cirkunovs v. Zuffa and Davis v. Zuffa ====
In May 2025, two antitrust lawsuits were filed against the UFC. One, led by former fighter Misha Cirkunov, specifically challenges the enforceability of arbitration clauses and class action waivers in UFC contracts. The other lawsuit, filed by former fighter Phil Davis, alleges that the UFC's anticompetitive practices also negatively impacted the ability of non-UFC fighters to secure fair wages.

=== Paramount and CBS partnership ===
On August 11, 2025, the UFC announced a seven-year media rights agreement with Paramount Skydance Corporation worth $7.7 billion. Paramount+ will exclusively stream all events for seven years, starting in 2026. Some numbered events will also air on CBS. The agreement will allow the UFC to move away from pay-per-view as events will stream on Paramount+ at no additional cost. All 13 of the UFC's flagship events and 30 Fight Nights a year will be streamed on the Paramount+ service. UFC CEO and President Dana White announced the UFC would produce four big events per year on CBS, and that the UFC's planned card for the White House on June 27, 2026, would one of those events.

== 2025 by the numbers ==
The numbers below records the events, fights, techniques, champions and fighters held or performed for the year of 2025 in UFC.

Events
Number of Events	PPV	Continents	Countries	Cities	Fight Night Bonuses
42	13	5	12	26	169; Total $8,450,000
Longest Event	Shortest Event	Highest Income Live Gate	Lowest Income Live Gate	Highest Attendance	Lowest Attendance
UFC on ABC: Hill vs. Rountree Jr. 2:53:52	UFC on ESPN: Gamrot vs. Klein 1:36:45	UFC 322 $13,624,189	UFC Fight Night: Ulberg vs. Reyes $1,800,000	UFC 322 20,664	UFC Fight Night: Ulberg vs. Reyes (exclud. APEX events); 12,543
Title Fights
Undisputed Title Fights	Title Changes	Champions Remained in Their Divisions	Number of Champions	Number of Interim Champions	Number of Title Defenses
21	8	2 LHW – Alex Pereira; WFW – Valentina Shevchenko	13	0	9
Champions
Division	Beginning of The Year	End of The Year	Division	Beginning of The Year	End of The Year
Heavyweight	Jon Jones	Tom Aspinall	Bantamweight	Merab Dvalishvili	Petr Yan
Light Heavyweight	Alex Pereira	Alex Pereira	Flyweight	Alexandre Pantoja	Joshua Van
Middleweight	Dricus du Plessis	Khamzat Chimaev	Women's Bantamweight	Julianna Peña	Kayla Harrison
Welterweight	Belal Muhammad	Islam Makhachev	Women's Flyweight	Valentina Shevchenko	Valentina Shevchenko
Lightweight	Islam Makhachev	Ilia Topuria	Women's Strawweight	Zhang Weili	Mackenzie Dern
Featherweight	Ilia Topuria	Alexander Volkanovski			
Fights
Most Knockouts at A Single Event	Most submissions at A Single Event	Most Decisions at A Single Event	Total Number of Fights	Total Number of Cage Time	
UFC Fight Night: Imavov vs. Borralho 9	UFC Fight Night: Garcia vs. Onama 6	UFC on ABC: Hill vs. Rountree Jr. 10	520	93:43:36	
Fighters
Number of Fighters	UFC Debutants	Releases / Retired	Fighters Suspended	Number of Fighters Missed weight	
(At the end of Dec 31, 2025); 597	94	114	13	32	
Champion feats
Islam Makhachev became the first UFC Lightweight champion to record four consecutive title defenses.; Magomed Ankalaev became the first Russian Light Heavyweight champion in UFC history.; Valentina Shevchenko became the sixth fighter in UFC history to reach at least ten title‑fight victories.; Kayla Harrison became the second fighter after Henry Cejudo to hold both an Olympic gold medal and a UFC championship with her UFC Bantamweight Championship win.; Ilia Topuria became the first fighter in UFC history to claim titles in two weight classes (Featherweight and Lightweight) while remaining undefeated.; Max Holloway became the first fighter to successfully defend the BMF title.; Merab Dvalishvili's 20 takedowns at UFC 320 are the most in a UFC championship fight.; Joshua Van became the first champion from Myanmar, the first champion born in the 2000s, and, at 24 years old, the second‑youngest first‑time champion in UFC history behind Jon Jones with his UFC Flyweight title win.
Fighter feats
Merab Dvalishvili set a new record for most takedowns landed by securing his 92nd at UFC 311.; Andrea Lee set the record for most consecutive losses in the UFC by a woman (6); Nikolas Motta became the first fighter to earn two fight‑night bonuses in a loss, receiving Performance of the Night and Fight of the Night at UFC on ABC 8.; Joshua Van and Brandon Royval combined for 419 significant strikes—the single‑fight record for a three‑round bout, the most in flyweight history and the third‑most all‑time—with Van landing 215 and Royval 204, marking the first fight in UFC history in which both competitors recorded at least 200 significant strikes.; Steven Nguyen's six knockdowns at UFC on ABC 9 set the single‑fight record in company history, including five in Round 1, which also established the single‑round record.; Khamzat Chimaev set multiple single‑fight records by landing 529 total strikes, including 411 to the head and 517 on the ground.; Charles Oliveira extended his company records for most stoppage wins (21), most submission wins (17), and most fight‑night bonuses (21), and his 21 stoppage victories across UFC/WEC/PRIDE/Strikeforce tied Mirko Cro Cop for the most in combined organizational history.; Drew Dober broke the record for most knockouts in the UFC lightweight division (10); Valter Walker became the first fighter in UFC history to earn four straight wins by heel‑hook submission.; Islam Makhachev's 16th consecutive octagon victory tied Anderson Silva's all‑time record for the longest winning streak in UFC history.

== 2025 UFC Honors awards ==
Starting in 2019, the UFC created year-end awards with "UFC Honors President's Choice Awards" for categories "Performance of the Year" and "Fight of the Year" being chosen by UFC CEO Dana White. The other "UFC Honors Fan Choice Awards" are for categories "Knockout of the Year", "Submission of the Year", "Event of the Year", "Comeback of the Year" and, from 2020, "Debut of the Year" in which fans are able to vote for the winner on social media.

Winners traditionally received a commemorative trophy along with a set of Toyo Tires, but beginning in 2026, Toyo Tires was no longer a sponsor of the awards.

2025 UFC Honors Awards
	Performance of the Year	Fight of the Year	Knockout of the Year	Submission of the Year	Debut of the Year	Event of the Year	Comeback of the Year
Winner	Lerone Murphy defeats Aaron Pico; UFC 319	Joshua Van defeats Brandon Royval; UFC 317	Ilia Topuria defeats Charles Oliveira; UFC 317	Islam Makhachev defeats Renato Moicano; UFC 311	Quillan Salkilld defeats Anshul Jubli; UFC 312	UFC 320: Ankalaev vs. Pereira 2	Jiří Procházka defeats Khalil Rountree Jr. UFC 320
Nominee	Maurício Ruffy defeats King Green; UFC 313	Merab Dvalishvili defeats Umar Nurmagomedov; UFC 311	Maurício Ruffy defeats King Green; UFC 313	Merab Dvalishvili defeats Sean O'Malley 2 UFC 316	Malcolm Wellmaker defeats Cameron Saaiman; UFC on ESPN: Machado Garry vs. Prates	UFC 317: Topuria vs. Oliveira	César Almeida defeats Abdul Razak Alhassan; UFC Fight Night: Dern vs. Ribas 2
Nominee	Ilia Topuria defeats Charles Oliveira; UFC 317	Nazim Sadykhov defeats Nikolas Motta; UFC on ABC: Hill vs. Rountree Jr.	Lerone Murphy defeats Aaron Pico; UFC 319	Kayla Harrison defeats Julianna Peña; UFC 316	Ateba Gautier defeats José Medina; UFC on ESPN: Moreno vs. Erceg	UFC 319: du Plessis vs. Chimaev	Shauna Bannon defeats Puja Tomar; UFC Fight Night: Edwards vs. Brady
Nominee	Joe Pyfer defeats Abusupiyan Magomedov; UFC 320	Diego Lopes defeats Jean Silva; UFC Fight Night: Lopes vs. Silva	Elijah Smith defeats Toshiomi Kazama; UFC on ESPN: Dolidze vs. Hernandez	Jean Silva defeats Bryce Mitchell; UFC 314	Beatriz Mesquita defeats Irina Alekseeva; UFC Fight Night: Oliveira vs. Gamrot	UFC 322: Della Maddalena vs. Makhachev	Cody Brundage defeats Julian Marquez; UFC Fight Night: Kape vs. Almabayev
Nominee	Michael Morales defeats Sean Brady; UFC 322	Jiří Procházka defeats Khalil Rountree Jr. UFC 320	—N/a	—N/a	—N/a	—N/a	—N/a
Ref							

== 2025 UFC.com awards ==
This is the first edition of the UFC.com Awards not written by the late former senior editor Thomas Gerbasi, who passed away in September 2025.

2025 UFC.COM Awards
No	The Fighter	The Submissions	The Newcomers	The Knockouts	The Fights
1	Merab Dvalishvili	Merab Dvalishvili defeats Sean O'Malley 2 UFC 316	Quillan Salkilld	Lerone Murphy defeats Aaron Pico; UFC 319	Joshua Van defeats Brandon Royval; UFC 317
2	Joshua Van	Jean Silva defeats Bryce Mitchell; UFC 314	Ateba Gautier	Maurício Ruffy defeats King Green; UFC 313	Jiří Procházka defeats Khalil Rountree Jr. UFC 320
3	Islam Makhachev	Kayla Harrison defeats Julianna Peña; UFC 316	Kevin Vallejos	Carlos Prates defeats Geoff Neal; UFC 319	Nazim Sadykhov defeats Nikolas Motta; UFC on ABC: Hill vs. Rountree Jr.
4	Waldo Cortes-Acosta	Anthony Hernandez defeats Roman Dolidze; UFC on ESPN: Dolidze vs. Hernandez	David Martínez	Ilia Topuria defeats Charles Oliveira; UFC 317	Jack Della Maddalena defeats Belal Muhammad; UFC 315
5	(5) Valentina Shevchenko (5) Jiří Procházka	Valter Walker defeats Don'Tale Mayes; UFC Fight Night: Cannonier vs. Rodrigues; Kennedy Nzechukwu; UFC on ESPN: Lewis vs. Teixeira; Louie Sutherland; UFC 321	Malcolm Wellmaker	Quillan Salkilld defeats Nasrat Haqparast; UFC 321	Iwo Baraniewski defeats İbo Aslan; UFC 323
Ref					

== Releases and retirements ==
These fighters have either been released from their UFC contracts, announced their retirement, or joined other promotions:

Month	Day	ISO	Fighter	Division	Reason	Ref
January	7	(South Korea)	Kang Kyung-ho	Bantamweight	Released	
January	8	(England)	Danny Roberts	Welterweight	Released	
January	8	(United States)	Urijah Faber	Bantamweight	Released	
January	8	(Brazil)	Victor Hugo	Featherweight	Released	
January	13	(United States)	Holly Holm	Women's Bantamweight	Released at her request	
January	15	(Poland)	Michał Figlak	Lightweight	Released	
January	16	(United States)	Clay Guida	Lightweight	Released	
January	18	(United States)	Chris Weidman	Middleweight	Retired	
January	24	(Sweden)	Josefine Lindgren Knutsson	Women's Strawweight	Signed with GFL	
January	24	(United States)	Julio Arce	Featherweight	Signed with GFL	
January	24	(United States)	Tony Ferguson	Lightweight	Signed with GFL	
January	25	(Ukraine)	Ihor Potieria	Middleweight	Released	
January	25	(United States)	José Johnson	Flyweight	Released	
January	25	(Bahrain)	Magomed Gadzhiyasulov	Light Heavyweight	Released	
January	25	(Russia)	Victoria Dudakova	Women's Strawweight	Released	
February	1	(United States)	Matthew Semelsberger	Welterweight	Released	
February	3	(Suriname)	Jairzinho Rozenstruik	Heavyweight	Released	
February	3	(United States)	Jamal Pogues	Heavyweight	Released	
February	6	(United States)	Dominick Cruz	Bantamweight	Retired	
February	11	(United States)	Bill Algeo	Featherweight	Retired	
February	15	(United States)	Julia Avila	Women's Bantamweight	Retired	
February	17	(United States)	Joe Solecki	Lightweight	Retired	
February	18	(United States)	Dylan Budka	Middleweight	Released	
February	19	(Brazil)	Warlley Alves	Middleweight	Parted ways	
February	25	(Uzbekistan)	Mashrabjon Ruziboev	Lightweight	Released	
February	27	(United States)	Cody Stamann	Bantamweight	Released	
February	27	(United States)	Jonathan Pearce	Featherweight	Released	
February	27	(Australia)	Joshua Culibao	Featherweight	Released	
February	27	(France)	Taylor Lapilus	Bantamweight	Released	
February	28	(Israel)	Natan Levy	Lightweight	Released	
February	28	(United States)	Roosevelt Roberts	Lightweight	Released	
March	5	(United States)	Julian Marquez	Middleweight	Released	
March	7	(United States)	Andrea Lee	Women's Flyweight	Released	
March	13	(United States)	Landon Quiñones	Lightweight	Released	
March	14	(Armenia)	Armen Petrosyan	Middleweight	Contract Expired	
March	17	(Brazil)	Marcos Rogério de Lima	Heavyweight	Released	
March	20	(United States)	Montana De La Rosa	Women's Flyweight	Released	
March	21	(Ukraine)	Danylo Voievodkin	Heavyweight	Released	
March	22	(England)	Molly McCann	Women's Flyweight	Retired	
March	25	(Ghana)	Abdul Razak Alhassan	Middleweight	Released	
March	25	(Kyrgyzstan)	Antonina Shevchenko	Women's Flyweight	Retired	
March	25	(Russia)	Artem Vakhitov	Light Heavyweight	Rejected Offer	
March	27	(United States)	Walt Harris	Heavyweight	Released	
April	3	(United States)	C.J. Vergara	Flyweight	Released	
April	8	(Romania)	Diana Belbiţă	Flyweight	Retired	
April	9	(Brazil)	Gabriel Miranda	Featherweight	Released	
April	9	(Brazil)	Istela Nunes	Women's Strawweight	Released	
April	9	(South Korea)	Choi Seung-woo	Featherweight	Released	
April	19	(Afghanistan)	Ahmad Sohail Hassanzada	Lightweight	Released after being arrested	
April	23	(Republic of Ireland)	Caolán Loughran	Bantamweight	Released	
April	23	(United States)	Cortavious Romious	Bantamweight	Released	
April	23	(Brazil)	Lucas Alexander	Featherweight	Released	
April	23	(Brazil)	Pedro Falcão	Bantamweight	Released	
April	26	(United States)	Anthony Smith	Light Heavyweight	Retired	
April	28	(Georgia (country))	Guram Kutateladze	Lightweight	Released	
April	28	(France)	Kevin Jousset	Welterweight	Released	
April	28	(United States)	Vinc Pichel	Lightweight	Retired	
April	29	(United States)	Dan Argueta	Bantamweight	Retired	
May	3	(Brazil)	Marina Rodriguez	Women's Strawweight	Retired	
May	7	(United States)	Don'Tale Mayes	Heavyweight	Released	
May	7	(Norway)	Ivana Petrović	Women's Flyweight	Released	
May	10	(Brazil)	José Aldo	Featherweight	Retired	
May	15	(Brazil)	Bruno Silva	Middleweight	Released	
May	15	(United States)	Jimmy Flick	Flyweight	Released	
May	19	(United States)	Alex Caceres	Featherweight	Signed with Dirty Boxing	
May	26	(United States)	Carlos Hernandez	Flyweight	Released	
June	6	(United States)	Connor Matthews	Featherweight	Released	
June	6	(Canada)	Hakeem Dawodu	Featherweight	Parted ways	
June	6	(Brazil)	Kron Gracie	Featherweight	Released	
June	11	(Brazil)	Ariane da Silva	Women's Flyweight	End of Contract	
June	17	(Canada)	Brad Katona	Bantamweight	Released	
June	21	(United States)	Jon Jones	Heavyweight	Retired	
June	24	(United States)	Cheyanne Vlismas	Women's Strawweight	Retired	
June	27	(Chile)	Christopher Ewert	Middleweight	Released	
July	9	(Switzerland)	Ange Loosa	Welterweight	Released	
July	9	(Brazil)	Felipe dos Santos	Flyweight	Released	
July	9	(England)	Jordan Vucenic	Lightweight	Released	
July	9	(United States)	Trevin Giles	Welterweight	Retired	
July	9	(Brazil)	Viviane Araújo	Women's Flyweight	Released	
July	12	(United States)	Lauren Murphy	Women's Flyweight	Retired	
July	14	(Indonesia)	Jeka Saragih	Featherweight	Released	
July	19	(United States)	Dustin Poirier	Lightweight	Retired	
July	31	(Slovakia)	Martin Buday	Heavyweight	Contact Concluded	
August	16	(United States)	Alvin Hines	Heavyweight	Released	
August	19	(Lithuania)	Julija Stoliarenko	Women's Flyweight	Released	
August	20	(United States)	Bryan Battle	Middleweight	Released	
September	6	(Scotland)	Paul Craig	Light Heavyweight	Retired	
September	9	(Mexico)	Melissa Martinez	Women's Strawweight	Released	
September	9	(United States)	Westin Wilson	Featherweight	Released	
September	11	(United States)	Austin Hubbard	Lightweight	Released	
September	11	(China)	Maheshate Hayisaer	Lightweight	Released	
September	11	(Ukraine)	Maryna Moroz	Women's Flyweight	Released	
September	11	(United States)	Preston Parsons	Welterweight	Released	
October	9	(Australia)	Justin Tafa	Heavyweight	Released	
October	15	(Brazil)	André Muniz	Middleweight	Released	
October	15	(Guam)	Brogan Walker	Women's Flyweight	Released	
October	15	(Russia)	Irina Alekseeva	Women's Bantamweight	Released	
October	22	(United States)	Danny Barlow	Middleweight	Released	
October	27	(Kazakhstan)	Azat Maksum	Flyweight	Released	
October	27	(Egypt)	Hamdy Abdelwahab	Heavyweight	Released	
November	3	(United States)	Isaac Dulgarian	Featherweight	Released	
November	7	(Vietnam)	Quang Le	Bantamweight	Released	
November	7	(Peru)	Rolando Bedoya	Lightweight	Released	
November	7	(Israel)	Yanal Ashmouz	Lightweight	Released	
November	10	(United States)	Chris Barnett	Heavyweight	Released	
November	10	(Republic of Ireland)	Kiefer Crosbie	Welterweight	Released	
November	10	(United States)	Kurt Holobaugh	Lightweight	Released	
November	27	(Poland)	Marek Bujło	Heavyweight	Released	
December	6	(United States)	Henry Cejudo	Bantamweight	Retired	
December	16	(Poland)	Łukasz Brzeski	Heavyweight	Released	
December	16	(Poland)	Marcin Prachnio	Light Heavyweight	Released	
December	16	(Brazil)	Ricardo Ramos	Featherweight	Released	
December	16	(Russia)	Viacheslav Borshchev	Lightweight	Released	
December	16	(Japan)	Yusaku Kinoshita	Welterweight	Released	
December	18	(Republic of Ireland)	Rhys McKee	Welterweight	Released	
December	22	(Brazil)	Elizeu Zaleski dos Santos	Welterweight	Released	
December	22	(Tajikistan)	Loik Radzhabov	Lightweight	Released	
December	22	(Russia)	Rinat Fakhretdinov	Welterweight	Contract Concluded	

== Debut UFC fighters ==
The following fighters fought their first UFC fight in 2025:

Month	Day	ISO	Fighter	Division	Event	Ref
January	11	(United States)	Austin Bashi	Featherweight	UFC Fight Night 249	
January	11	(Brazil)	Bruno Lopes	Light Heavyweight	UFC Fight Night 249	
January	11	(United States)	Jacobe Smith	Welterweight	UFC Fight Night 249	
January	11	(Brazil)	Marco Tulio	Middleweight	UFC Fight Night 249	
January	11	(Brazil)	Nicolle Caliari	Women's Flyweight	UFC Fight Night 249	
January	18	(Russia)	Azamat Bekoev	Middleweight	UFC 311	
January	18	(United States)	Billy Elekana	Light Heavyweight	UFC 311	
February	1	(Austria)	Bogdan Grad	Featherweight	UFC Fight Night 250	
February	9	(Georgia (country))	Aleksandre Topuria	Bantamweight	UFC 312	
February	9	(Australia)	Colby Thicknesse	Bantamweight	UFC 312	
February	9	(Australia)	Jonathan Micallef	Welterweight	UFC 312	
February	9	(United States)	Kody Steele	Lightweight	UFC 312	
February	9	(Australia)	Quillan Salkilld	Lightweight	UFC 312	
February	9	(Brazil)	Tallison Teixeira	Heavyweight	UFC 312	
February	15	(United States)	Elijah Smith	Bantamweight	UFC Fight Night 251	
February	15	(United States)	Jose Miguel Delgado	Featherweight	UFC Fight Night 251	
February	22	(United States)	Austin Vanderford	Welterweight	UFC Fight Night 252	
February	22	(United States)	Eric McConico	Middleweight	UFC Fight Night 252	
February	22	(United States)	Julius Walker	Light Heavyweight	UFC Fight Night 252	
February	22	(United States)	Nick Klein	Middleweight	UFC Fight Night 252	
March	1	(Portugal)	Mário Pinto	Heavyweight	UFC Fight Night 253	
March	8	(Brazil)	Djorden Ribeiro dos Santos	Middleweight	UFC 313	
March	15	(Kazakhstan)	Diyar Nurgozhay	Light Heavyweight	UFC Fight Night 254	
March	15	(Democratic Republic of the Congo)	Josias Musasa	Bantamweight	UFC Fight Night 254	
March	15	(Argentina)	Kevin Vallejos	Featherweight	UFC Fight Night 254	
March	15	(Venezuela)	Yuneisy Duben	Women's Flyweight	UFC Fight Night 254	
March	22	(Brazil)	Alexia Thainara	Women's Strawweight	UFC Fight Night 255	
March	22	(Russia)	Andrey Pulyaev	Middleweight	UFC Fight Night 255	
March	29	(Cameroon)	Ateba Gautier	Middleweight	UFC on ESPN 64	
March	29	(Mexico)	David Martínez	Bantamweight	UFC on ESPN 64	
April	5	(Romania)	Daniel Frunza	Welterweight	UFC on ESPN 65	
April	5	(United States)	Luis Gurule	Flyweight	UFC on ESPN 65	
April	5	(United States)	Torrez Finney	Middleweight	UFC on ESPN 65	
April	5	(Kyrgyzstan)	Uran Satybaldiev	Heavyweight	UFC on ESPN 65	
April	12	(Brazil)	Patrício Pitbull	Featherweight	UFC 314	
April	26	(United States)	Gauge Young	Lightweight	UFC on ESPN 66	
April	26	(United States)	Malcolm Wellmaker	Bantamweight	UFC on ESPN 66	
May	17	(Brazil)	Matheus Camilo	Lightweight	UFC Fight Night 256	
May	17	(Cuba)	Yadier del Valle	Featherweight	UFC Fight Night 256	
May	31	(United States)	Michael Aswell	Lightweight	UFC on ESPN 68	
June	7	(Sweden)	Andreas Gustafsson	Welterweight	UFC 316	
June	7	(United States)	Mark Choinski	Lightweight	UFC 316	
June	7	(South Korea)	Yoo Joo-sang	Featherweight	UFC 316	
June	21	(South Korea)	Ko Seok-hyeon	Welterweight	UFC on ABC 8	
June	21	(Russia)	Rizvan Kuniev	Heavyweight	UFC on ABC 8	
June	21	(Azerbaijan)	Tofiq Musayev	Lightweight	UFC on ABC 8	
June	28	(United States)	Alvin Hines	Heavyweight	UFC 317	
July	19	(Germany)	Islam Dulatov	Welterweight	UFC 318	
July	19	(United States)	Jackson McVey	Middleweight	UFC 318	
July	26	(Brazil)	Marcus Buchecha	Heavyweight	UFC on ABC 9	
August	2	(United States)	John Yannis	Featherweight	UFC on ESPN 71	
August	16	(United States)	Aaron Pico	Featherweight	UFC 319	
August	16	(Kazakhstan)	Alibi Idiris	Flyweight	UFC 319	
August	16	(Russia)	Baisangur Susurkaev	Middleweight	UFC 319	
August	16	(United States)	Eric Nolan	Middleweight	UFC 319	
August	23	(China)	Taiyilake Nueraji	Welterweight	UFC Fight Night 257	
September	6	(Croatia)	Ante Delija	Heavyweight	UFC Fight Night 258	
September	6	(France)	Axel Sola	Welterweight	UFC Fight Night 258	
September	6	(England)	Harry Hardwick	Featherweight	UFC Fight Night 258	
September	6	(Poland)	Robert Ruchała	Featherweight	UFC Fight Night 258	
September	13	(United States)	Alden Coria	Flyweight	UFC Fight Night 259	
September	13	(Brazil)	Alice Pereira	Women's Bantamweight	UFC Fight Night 259	
September	13	(Ukraine)	Daniil Donchenko	Welterweight	UFC Fight Night 259	
September	13	(Brazil)	Rodrigo Sezinando	Welterweight	UFC Fight Night 259	
September	13	(Mexico)	Santiago Luna	Bantamweight	UFC Fight Night 259	
September	28	(Croatia)	Brando Peričić	Heavyweight	UFC Fight Night 260	
September	28	(Australia)	Cameron Rowston	Middleweight	UFC Fight Night 260	
September	28	(United States)	Elisha Ellison	Heavyweight	UFC Fight Night 260	
October	4	(Poland)	Jakub Wikłacz	Bantamweight	UFC 320	
October	4	(United States)	Tre'ston Vines	Middleweight	UFC 320	
October	11	(Brazil)	Beatriz Mesquita	Lightweight	UFC Fight Night 261	
October	18	(Canada)	Melissa Croden	Women's Bantamweight	UFC Fight Night 262	
October	18	(Netherlands)	Yousri Belgaroui	Middleweight	UFC Fight Night 262	
October	25	(England)	Louie Sutherland	Heavyweight	UFC 321	
November	1	(United States)	Donte Johnson	Middleweight	UFC Fight Night 263	
November	1	(Brazil)	Kevin Christian	Light Heavyweight	UFC Fight Night 263	
November	8	(United States)	Josh Hokit	Heavyweight	UFC Fight Night 264	
November	8	(Brazil)	Max Gimenis	Heavyweight	UFC Fight Night 264	
November	15	(United States)	Ethyn Ewing	Featherweight	UFC 322	
November	22	(Turkey)	Abdul-Rakhman Yakhyaev	Light Heavyweight	UFC Fight Night 265	
November	22	(United States)	Denzel Freeman	Heavyweight	UFC Fight Night 265	
November	22	(England)	Luke Riley	Featherweight	UFC Fight Night 265	
November	22	(Poland)	Marek Bujło	Heavyweight	UFC Fight Night 265	
November	22	(Russia)	Saygid Izagakhmaev	Welterweight	UFC Fight Night 265	
November	22	(England)	Shaqueme Rock	Lightweight	UFC Fight Night 265	
December	6	(Poland)	Iwo Baraniewski	Light Heavyweight	UFC 323	
December	13	(United States)	Allen Frye	Heavyweight	UFC on ESPN 73	
December	13	(Poland)	Cezary Oleksiejczuk	Middleweight	UFC on ESPN 73	
December	13	(Brazil)	Guilherme Pat	Heavyweight	UFC on ESPN 73	
December	13	(Australia)	Isaac Thomson	Featherweight	UFC on ESPN 73	
December	13	(Canada)	Lance Gibson Jr.	Lightweight	UFC on ESPN 73	
December	13	(Ukraine)	Yaroslav Amosov	Welterweight	UFC on ESPN 73	

== Suspended fighters ==
The list below is based on fighters suspended either by (1) United States Anti-Doping Agency (USADA) or World Anti-Doping Agency (WADA) for violation of taking prohibited substances or non-analytical incidents, (2) by local commissions on misconduct during the fights or at event venues, or (3) by the UFC for reasons also stated below.

ISO	Name	Nickname	Division	From	Duration	Tested positive for / Info	By	Eligible to fight again	Ref.	Notes
(United States)	Walt Harris	The Big Ticket	Heavyweight	July 11, 2023	4 years	Drostanolone and its metabolites, exogenous testosterone, and Anastrozole	CSAD	July 11, 2027		Parted with UFC as of March 2025.
(Armenia)	Arman Tsarukyan	Akhalkalakets	Lightweight	April 13, 2024	9 months	Pre-fight altercation with spectator during UFC 300	NSAC	January 12, 2025		$25,000 fine; additionally, if he issued an anti-bullying public service announcement approved by the NSAC, sentence could have been reduced to six months with fight eligibility on October 12, 2024
Egypt	Hamdy Abdelwahab	The Hammer	Heavyweight	July 30, 2024	6 months	Exogenous testosterone	CSAD	January 30, 2025		
(Republic of Ireland)	Conor McGregor	Notorious	Lightweight	September 20, 2024	18 months	Three anti-doping whereabout failures on June 13, September 19, and September 20, 2024.	CSAD	March 20, 2026		
(Russia)	Azamat Murzakanov	The Professional	Light Heavyweight	November 1, 2024	6 months	LGD-4033 metabolites	CSAD	May 1, 2025		Second violation under the UFC.
(United States)	Dennis Buzukja	The Great	Lightweight	December 7, 2024	9 months	Altercation with a fan at UFC 310	NSAC	September 7, 2025		$2,500 fine with additional legal fees of $157.04; additionally, if he does community service executed by the NSAC, sentence can be reduced to six months with fight eligibility on June 7, 2025.
(Brazil)	Marcos Rogério de Lima	Pezão	Heavyweight	January 24, 2025	1 year	Anastrozole	CSAD	January 24, 2026		Second violation under the UFC. Parted ways with the UFC in March 2025.
(Ukraine)	Danylo Voievodkin		Heavyweight	November 10, 2024	2 years	Meldonium	CSAD	November 10, 2026		Parted ways with the UFC in March 2025.
(Brazil)	Douglas Silva de Andrade	D-Silva	Bantamweight	February 28, 2025	6 months	Furosemide	CSAD	August 28, 2025		
(United States)	Sean Strickland	Tarzan	Middleweight	June 29, 2025	6 months	Altercation at a Tuff-N-Uff event	NSAC	December 29, 2025		$5,000 fine with additional legal fees; additionally, if he does complete an anger management course, sentence can be reduced to four and a half months with fight eligibility on November 11, 2025.
(United States)	Alvin Hines	Goozie	Heavyweight	July 11, 2025	1 year	Anabolic steroid Drostanolone	CSAD	July 11, 2026		Parted ways with the UFC in August 2025.
(Uzbekistan)	Ramazan Temirov	Temurlan	Flyweight	July 5, 2025	1 year	Trimetazidine	CSAD	July 5, 2026		
(Ukraine)	Maryna Moroz	The Iron Lady	Women's Flyweight	July 17, 2025	1 year	Meldonium	CSAD	July 17, 2026		Parted ways with the UFC in September 2025.

== The Ultimate Fighter ==
The following The Ultimate Fighter season was broadcast in 2025:

Season	Division	Winner	Runner-up	Ref
The Ultimate Fighter 33	Flyweight	Joseph Morales	Alibi Idiris	
The Ultimate Fighter 33	Welterweight	Daniil Donchenko	Rodrigo Sezinando	

== Title fights ==
Title fights in 2025
Weight class				Method	Round	Time	Event	Notes
Bantamweight	Merab Dvalishvili (c)	def.	Umar Nurmagomedov	Decision (unanimous) (48–47, 48–47, 49–46)	5	5:00	UFC 311	(Note: For the UFC Bantamweight Championship.)
Lightweight	Islam Makhachev (c)	def.	Renato Moicano	Submission (brabo choke)	1	4:05	UFC 311	(Note: For the UFC Lightweight Championship.)
Women's Strawweight	Zhang Weili (c)	def.	Tatiana Suarez	Decision (unanimous) (49–46, 49–46, 49–45)	5	5:00	UFC 312	(Note: For the UFC Women's Strawweight Championship.)
Middleweight	Dricus du Plessis (c)	def.	Sean Strickland	Decision (unanimous) (50–45, 50–45, 49–46)	5	5:00	UFC 312	(Note: For the UFC Middleweight Championship.)
Light Heavyweight	Magomed Ankalaev	def.	Alex Pereira (c)	Decision (unanimous) (49–46, 48–47, 48–47)	5	5:00	UFC 313	(Note: For the UFC Light Heavyweight Championship.)
Featherweight	Alexander Volkanovski	def.	Diego Lopes	Decision (unanimous) (48–47, 49–46, 49–46)	5	5:00	UFC 314	(Note: For the vacant UFC Featherweight Championship.)
Women's Flyweight	Valentina Shevchenko (c)	def.	Manon Fiorot	Decision (unanimous) (48–47, 48–47, 48–47)	5	5:00	UFC 315	(Note: For the UFC Women's Flyweight Championship.)
Welterweight	Jack Della Maddalena	def.	Belal Muhammad (c)	Decision (unanimous) (48–47, 48–47, 49–46)	5	5:00	UFC 315	(Note: For the UFC Welterweight Championship.)
Women's Bantamweight	Kayla Harrison	def.	Julianna Peña (c)	Submission (kimura)	2	4:55	UFC 316	(Note: For the UFC Women's Bantamweight Championship.)
Bantamweight	Merab Dvalishvili (c)	def.	Sean O'Malley	Submission (north-south choke)	3	4:42	UFC 316	(Note: For the UFC Bantamweight Championship.)
Flyweight	Alexandre Pantoja (c)	def.	Kai Kara-France	Submission (rear-naked choke)	3	1:54	UFC 317	(Note: For the UFC Flyweight Championship.)
Lightweight	Ilia Topuria	def.	Charles Oliveira	KO (punches)	1	2:27	UFC 317	(Note: For the vacant UFC Lightweight Championship.)
Middleweight	Khamzat Chimaev	def.	Dricus du Plessis (c)	Decision (unanimous) (50–44, 50–44, 50–44)	5	5:00	UFC 319	(Note: For the UFC Middleweight Championship.)
Bantamweight	Merab Dvalishvili (c)	def.	Cory Sandhagen	Decision (unanimous) (49–45, 49–45, 49–46)	5	5:00	UFC 320	(Note: For the UFC Bantamweight Championship.)
Light Heavyweight	Alex Pereira	def.	Magomed Ankalaev (c)	TKO (punches and elbows)	1	1:20	UFC 320	(Note: For the UFC Light Heavyweight Championship.)
Women's Strawweight	Mackenzie Dern	def.	Virna Jandiroba	Decision (unanimous) (48–47, 48–47, 49–46)	5	5:00	UFC 321	(Note: For the vacant UFC Women's Strawweight Championship.)
Heavyweight	Tom Aspinall (c)	vs.	Ciryl Gane	NC (accidental eye poke)	1	4:35	UFC 321	(Note: For the UFC Heavyweight Championship.)
Women's Flyweight	Valentina Shevchenko (c)	def.	Zhang Weili	Decision (unanimous) (50–45, 50–45, 50–45)	5	5:00	UFC 322	(Note: For the UFC Women's Flyweight Championship.)
Welterweight	Islam Makhachev	def.	Jack Della Maddalena (c)	Decision (unanimous) (50–45, 50–45, 50–45)	5	5:00	UFC 322	(Note: For the UFC Welterweight Championship.)
Flyweight	Joshua Van	def.	Alexandre Pantoja (c)	TKO (arm injury)	1	0:26	UFC 323	(Note: For the UFC Flyweight Championship.)
Bantamweight	Petr Yan	def.	Merab Dvalishvili (c)	Decision (unanimous) (49–46, 49–46, 48–47)	5	5:00	UFC 323	(Note: For the UFC Bantamweight Championship.)

== Events list ==
=== Past events ===
#	Event	Date	Venue	City	Country	Atten.	Ref.	Fight of the Night			Performance of the Night		Bonus	Ref.
758	UFC on ESPN: Royval vs. Kape	Dec 13, 2025	UFC Apex	Las Vegas, Nevada	United States	—N/a		Steven Asplund	vs.	Sean Sharaf	Manel Kape	Kevin Vallejos	$50,000	
757	UFC 323: Dvalishvili vs. Yan 2	Dec 6, 2025	T-Mobile Arena	Las Vegas, Nevada	United States	18,603		Merab Dvalishvili	vs.	Petr Yan	Manuel Torres	Iwo Baraniewski	$50,000	
756	UFC Fight Night: Tsarukyan vs. Hooker	Nov 22, 2025	Ali Bin Hamad al-Attiyah Arena	Al Rayyan	Qatar	—N/a		—N/a			Arman Tsarukyan	Waldo Cortes-Acosta	$50,000	
756	UFC Fight Night: Tsarukyan vs. Hooker	Nov 22, 2025	Ali Bin Hamad al-Attiyah Arena	Al Rayyan	Qatar	—N/a		—N/a			Kyoji Horiguchi	Luke Riley	$50,000	
755	UFC 322: Della Maddalena vs. Makhachev	Nov 15, 2025	Madison Square Garden	New York City	United States	20,664		—N/a			Michael Morales	Carlos Prates	$50,000	
755	UFC 322: Della Maddalena vs. Makhachev	Nov 15, 2025	Madison Square Garden	New York City	United States	20,664		—N/a			Benoît Saint Denis	Bo Nickal	$50,000	
754	UFC Fight Night: Bonfim vs. Brown	Nov 8, 2025	UFC Apex	Las Vegas, Nevada	United States	—N/a		—N/a			Gabriel Bonfim	Christian Leroy Duncan	$50,000	
754	UFC Fight Night: Bonfim vs. Brown	Nov 8, 2025	UFC Apex	Las Vegas, Nevada	United States	—N/a		—N/a			Josh Hokit	Zachary Reese	$50,000	
753	UFC Fight Night: Garcia vs. Onama	Nov 1, 2025	UFC Apex	Las Vegas, Nevada	United States	—N/a		—N/a			Steve Garcia	Waldo Cortes-Acosta	$50,000	
753	UFC Fight Night: Garcia vs. Onama	Nov 1, 2025	UFC Apex	Las Vegas, Nevada	United States	—N/a		—N/a			Allan Nascimento	Donte Johnson	$50,000	
752	UFC 321: Aspinall vs. Gane	Oct 25, 2025	Etihad Arena	Abu Dhabi	United Arab Emirates	13,220		Ľudovít Klein	vs.	Mateusz Rębecki	Quillan Salkilld	Valter Walker	$50,000	
751	UFC Fight Night: de Ridder vs. Allen	Oct 18, 2025	Rogers Arena	Vancouver, British Columbia	Canada	17,671		Drew Dober	vs.	Kyle Prepolec	Charles Jourdain	Aori Qileng	$50,000	
750	UFC Fight Night: Oliveira vs. Gamrot	Oct 11, 2025	Farmasi Arena	Rio de Janeiro	Brazil	16,297		—N/a			Charles Oliveira	Vitor Petrino	$50,000	
750	UFC Fight Night: Oliveira vs. Gamrot	Oct 11, 2025	Farmasi Arena	Rio de Janeiro	Brazil	16,297		—N/a			Beatriz Mesquita	Julia Polastri	$50,000	
749	UFC 320: Ankalaev vs. Pereira 2	Oct 4, 2025	T-Mobile Arena	Las Vegas, Nevada	United States	19,081		Jiří Procházka	vs.	Khalil Rountree Jr.	Alex Pereira	Jiří Procházka	$50,000	
749	UFC 320: Ankalaev vs. Pereira 2	Oct 4, 2025	T-Mobile Arena	Las Vegas, Nevada	United States	19,081		Jiří Procházka	vs.	Khalil Rountree Jr.	Joe Pyfer	—N/a	$50,000	
748	UFC Fight Night: Ulberg vs. Reyes	Sep 28, 2025	RAC Arena	Perth	Australia	12,543		—N/a			Carlos Ulberg	Jimmy Crute	$50,000	
748	UFC Fight Night: Ulberg vs. Reyes	Sep 28, 2025	RAC Arena	Perth	Australia	12,543		—N/a			Tom Nolan	Brando Peričić	$50,000	
747	UFC Fight Night: Lopes vs. Silva	Sep 13, 2025	Frost Bank Center	San Antonio, Texas	United States	18,005		Diego Lopes	vs.	Jean Silva	Diego Lopes	Santiago Luna	$50,000	
746	UFC Fight Night: Imavov vs. Borralho	Sep 6, 2025	Accor Arena	Paris	France	15,724		—N/a			Benoît Saint Denis	Mason Jones	$50,000	
746	UFC Fight Night: Imavov vs. Borralho	Sep 6, 2025	Accor Arena	Paris	France	15,724		—N/a			Ante Delija	Kauê Fernandes	$50,000	
745	UFC Fight Night: Walker vs. Zhang	Aug 23, 2025	Shanghai Indoor Stadium	Shanghai	China	—N/a		—N/a			Johnny Walker	Charles Johnson	$50,000	
745	UFC Fight Night: Walker vs. Zhang	Aug 23, 2025	Shanghai Indoor Stadium	Shanghai	China	—N/a		—N/a			Kyle Daukaus	Uran Satybaldiev	$50,000	
744	UFC 319: du Plessis vs. Chimaev	Aug 16, 2025	United Center	Chicago, Illinois	United States	20,023		—N/a			Khamzat Chimaev	Lerone Murphy	$50,000	
744	UFC 319: du Plessis vs. Chimaev	Aug 16, 2025	United Center	Chicago, Illinois	United States	20,023		—N/a			Carlos Prates	Tim Elliott	$50,000	
743	UFC on ESPN: Dolidze vs. Hernandez	Aug 9, 2025	UFC Apex	Las Vegas, Nevada	United States	—N/a		—N/a			Anthony Hernandez	Christian Leroy Duncan	$50,000	
743	UFC on ESPN: Dolidze vs. Hernandez	Aug 9, 2025	UFC Apex	Las Vegas, Nevada	United States	—N/a		—N/a			Elijah Smith	Joselyne Edwards	$50,000	
742	UFC on ESPN: Taira vs. Park	Aug 2, 2025	UFC Apex	Las Vegas, Nevada	United States	—N/a		Chris Duncan	vs.	Mateusz Rębecki	—N/a		$50,000	
742	UFC on ESPN: Taira vs. Park	Aug 2, 2025	UFC Apex	Las Vegas, Nevada	United States	—N/a		Esteban Ribovics	vs.	Elves Brener	—N/a		$50,000	
741	UFC on ABC: Whittaker vs De Ridder	Jul 26, 2025	Etihad Arena	Abu Dhabi	United Arab Emirates	—N/a		Sharabutdin Magomedov	vs.	Marc-André Barriault	Muslim Salikhov	Steven Nguyen	$50,000	
740	UFC 318: Holloway vs. Poirier 3	Jul 19, 2025	Smoothie King Center	New Orleans, Louisiana	United States	18,138		Brendan Allen	vs.	Marvin Vettori	Ateba Gautier	Islam Dulatov	$50,000	
740	UFC 318: Holloway vs. Poirier 3	Jul 19, 2025	Smoothie King Center	New Orleans, Louisiana	United States	18,138		Brendan Allen	vs.	Marvin Vettori	Carli Judice	—N/a	$50,000	
739	UFC on ESPN: Lewis vs. Teixeira	Jul 12, 2025	Bridgestone Arena	Nashville, Tennessee	United States	17,007		Morgan Charrière	vs.	Nate Landwehr	Valter Walker	Fatima Kline	$50,000	
738	UFC 317: Topuria vs. Oliveira	Jun 28, 2025	T-Mobile Arena	Las Vegas, Nevada	United States	19,800		Brandon Royval	vs.	Joshua Van	Ilia Topuria	Gregory Rodrigues	$50,000	
737	UFC on ABC: Hill vs. Rountree Jr.	Jun 21, 2025	Baku Crystal Hall	Baku	Azerbaijan	14,424		Nazim Sadykhov	vs.	Nikolas Motta	Nazim Sadykhov	Nikolas Motta	$50,000	
736	UFC on ESPN: Usman vs. Buckley	Jun 14, 2025	State Farm Arena	Atlanta, Georgia	United States	17,204		Kamaru Usman	vs.	Joaquin Buckley	Malcolm Wellmaker	Jose Ochoa	$50,000	
735	UFC 316: Dvalishvili vs. O'Malley 2	Jun 7, 2025	Prudential Center	Newark, New Jersey	United States	17,343		—N/a			Merab Dvalishvili	Kayla Harrison	$50,000	
735	UFC 316: Dvalishvili vs. O'Malley 2	Jun 7, 2025	Prudential Center	Newark, New Jersey	United States	17,343		—N/a			Kevin Holland	Yoo Joo-sang	$50,000	
734	UFC on ESPN: Gamrot vs. Klein	May 31, 2025	UFC Apex	Las Vegas, Nevada	United States	—N/a		Rayanne dos Santos	vs.	Alice Ardelean	Ramiz Brahimaj	Jordan Leavitt	$50,000	
733	UFC Fight Night: Burns vs. Morales	May 17, 2025	UFC Apex	Las Vegas, Nevada	United States	—N/a		Julian Erosa	vs.	Melquizael Costa	Michael Morales	Denise Gomes	$50,000	
732	UFC 315: Muhammad vs. Della Maddalena	May 10, 2025	Bell Centre	Montreal, Quebec	Canada	19,786		Belal Muhammad	vs.	Jack Della Maddalena	Jasmine Jasudavicius	Marc-André Barriault	$50,000	
731	UFC on ESPN: Sandhagen vs. Figueiredo	May 3, 2025	Wells Fargo Arena	Des Moines, Iowa	United States	15,627		—N/a			Cory Sandhagen	Reinier de Ridder	$50,000	
731	UFC on ESPN: Sandhagen vs. Figueiredo	May 3, 2025	Wells Fargo Arena	Des Moines, Iowa	United States	15,627		—N/a			Azamat Bekoev	Quang Le	$50,000	
730	UFC on ESPN: Machado Garry vs. Prates	Apr 26, 2025	T-Mobile Center	Kansas City, Missouri	United States	15,984		Randy Brown	vs.	Nicolas Dalby	Zhang Mingyang	Malcolm Wellmaker	$50,000	
729	UFC 314: Volkanovski vs. Lopes	Apr 12, 2025	Kaseya Center	Miami, Florida	United States	18,287		Alexander Volkanovski	vs.	Diego Lopes	Paddy Pimblett	Jean Silva	$50,000	
728	UFC on ESPN: Emmett vs. Murphy	Apr 5, 2025	UFC Apex	Las Vegas, Nevada	United States	—N/a		—N/a			Lee Chang-ho	Ode' Osbourne	$50,000	
728	UFC on ESPN: Emmett vs. Murphy	Apr 5, 2025	UFC Apex	Las Vegas, Nevada	United States	—N/a		—N/a			Dione Barbosa	Rhys McKee	$50,000	
727	UFC on ESPN: Moreno vs. Erceg	Mar 29, 2025	Arena CDMX	Mexico City	Mexico	19,731		—N/a			Manuel Torres	Édgar Cháirez	$50,000	
727	UFC on ESPN: Moreno vs. Erceg	Mar 29, 2025	Arena CDMX	Mexico City	Mexico	19,731		—N/a			David Martínez	Ateba Gautier	$50,000	
726	UFC Fight Night: Edwards vs. Brady	Mar 22, 2025	The O_{2} Arena	London	England	18,583		—N/a			Sean Brady	Kevin Holland	$50,000	
726	UFC Fight Night: Edwards vs. Brady	Mar 22, 2025	The O_{2} Arena	London	England	18,583		—N/a			Alexia Thainara	Shauna Bannon	$50,000	
725	UFC Fight Night: Vettori vs. Dolidze 2	Mar 15, 2025	UFC Apex	Las Vegas, Nevada	United States	—N/a		—N/a			Carlos Vera	André Lima	$50,000	
725	UFC Fight Night: Vettori vs. Dolidze 2	Mar 15, 2025	UFC Apex	Las Vegas, Nevada	United States	—N/a		—N/a			Priscila Cachoeira	Carli Judice	$50,000	
724	UFC 313: Pereira vs. Ankalaev	Mar 8, 2025	T-Mobile Arena	Las Vegas, Nevada	United States	18,869		Justin Gaethje	vs.	Rafael Fiziev	Ignacio Bahamondes	Maurício Ruffy	$50,000	
723	UFC Fight Night: Kape vs. Almabayev	Mar 1, 2025	UFC Apex	Las Vegas, Nevada	United States	—N/a		Nasrat Haqparast	vs.	Esteban Ribovics	Manel Kape	Mário Pinto	$50,000	
722	UFC Fight Night: Cejudo vs. Song	Feb 22, 2025	Climate Pledge Arena	Seattle, Washington	United States	18,287		Alonzo Menifield	vs.	Julius Walker	Jean Silva	Ricky Simón	$50,000	
721	UFC Fight Night: Cannonier vs. Rodrigues	Feb 15, 2025	UFC Apex	Las Vegas, Nevada	United States	—N/a		Jared Cannonier	vs.	Gregory Rodrigues	Edmen Shahbazyan	Gabriel Bonfim	$50,000	
720	UFC 312: du Plessis vs. Strickland 2	Feb 9, 2025	Qudos Bank Arena	Sydney	Australia	18,253		Rong Zhu	vs.	Kody Steele	Tallison Teixeira	Quillan Salkilld	$50,000	
719	UFC Fight Night: Adesanya vs. Imavov	Feb 1, 2025	ANB Arena	Riyadh	Saudi Arabia	—N/a		Said Nurmagomedov	vs.	Vinicius Oliveira	Nassourdine Imavov	Bogdan Grad	$50,000	
718	UFC 311: Makhachev vs. Moicano	Jan 18, 2025	Intuit Dome	Inglewood, California	United States	18,370		Merab Dvalishvili	vs.	Umar Nurmagomedov	Jiří Procházka	Jailton Almeida	$50,000	
717	UFC Fight Night: Dern vs. Ribas 2	Jan 11, 2025	UFC Apex	Las Vegas, Nevada	United States	—N/a		Chris Curtis	vs.	Roman Kopylov	Mackenzie Dern	César Almeida	$50,000	

== See also ==
- List of UFC champions
- List of UFC events
- List of current UFC fighters
- 2025 in Professional Fighters League
- 2025 in ONE Championship
- 2025 in Konfrontacja Sztuk Walki
- 2025 in Legacy Fighting Alliance
- 2025 in Absolute Championship Akhmat
- 2025 in Rizin Fighting Federation
- 2025 in LUX Fight League
- 2025 in Oktagon MMA
- 2025 in Brave Combat Federation
- 2025 in Cage Warriors
