= UFC 318 =

Mixed martial arts event in 2025

UFC 318: Holloway vs. Poirier 3
- The poster for UFC 318: Holloway vs. Poirier 3
- Promotion: Ultimate Fighting Championship
- Date: July 19, 2025
- Venue: Smoothie King Center
- City: New Orleans, Louisiana, United States
- Attendance: 18,138
- Total gate: $8,088,122

Event chronology
UFC on ESPN: Lewis vs. Teixeira	UFC 318: Holloway vs. Poirier 3	UFC on ABC: Whittaker vs. de Ridder

UFC 318: Holloway vs. Poirier 3 was a mixed martial arts event produced by the Ultimate Fighting Championship that took place on July 19, 2025, at the Smoothie King Center in New Orleans, Louisiana, United States.

== Background ==
The event marked the promotion's sixth visit to New Orleans and first since UFC Fight Night: Boetsch vs. Henderson in June 2015.

Former UFC Featherweight Champion Max Holloway put his symbolic "BMF" (baddest motherfucker) title on the line against former interim UFC Lightweight Champion Dustin Poirier in a lightweight bout in the main event. This was their third meeting and Poirier's retirement fight. The pairing first met at UFC 143 in February 2012, when Holloway made his promotional debut and lost by a triangle-armbar submission. Their second outing was in April 2019 at UFC 236 when Poirier became the interim lightweight champion after winning via unanimous decision, which also ended Holloway's 13-fight win streak.

A middleweight bout between former UFC Middleweight Championship challenger Marvin Vettori and former LFA Middleweight Champion Brendan Allen took place in the preliminary card of the event. The pairing was previously scheduled to headline UFC Fight Night: Allen vs. Curtis 2 in April 2024, but Vettori withdrew due to an injury.

A welterweight bout between Islam Dulatov and Adam Fugitt took place at the event. The pairing was previously scheduled to meet at UFC Fight Night: Cejudo vs. Song in last February, but Dulatov was forced to withdraw due to a serious injury.

A welterweight bout between Neil Magny and Gunnar Nelson was scheduled for this event. They were previously scheduled to meet in May 2018 at UFC Fight Night: Thompson vs. Till but Nelson was forced to withdraw due to a knee injury. In turn, two weeks prior to the event, it was reported that Nelson withdrew again due to a hamstring injury, so the bout was cancelled and Magny was moved to the UFC on ESPN: Albazi vs. Taira two weeks later with a different opponent.

A light heavyweight bout between Jimmy Crute and Marcin Prachnio took place at the event. They were originally scheduled to compete in February at UFC 312 but Prachnio had to withdraw from the fight for unknown reasons.

A middleweight bout between Ateba Gautier and Robert Valentin took place at this event. They were briefly scheduled to compete at UFC on ESPN: Lewis vs. Teixeira one week prior, but the pairing was moved to this event for unknown reasons.

A women's strawweight bout between Amanda Ribas and Tabatha Ricci was scheduled for this event. However, the bout was moved to UFC on ABC: Whittaker vs. de Ridder one week later for unknown reasons.

A middleweight bout between former title challenger Paulo Costa and Roman Kopylov was scheduled for UFC 317. However the bout was moved to this event for unknown reasons.

Kevin Holland and Daniel Rodriguez met in a welterweight bout at this event. The pairing was first booked at UFC Fight Night: Woodley vs. Burns in May 2020, but Holland pulled out due to injury. They were then expected to meet again in September 2022 at UFC 279 in a catchweight bout of 180 pounds. However, the promotion opted to book them on short notice against different opponents at the same event, mainly due to Khamzat Chimaev missing weight by nearly 10 pounds for his headliner bout (Holland and Chimaev ended up facing each other in the co-main event).

A middleweight bout between Ikram Aliskerov and Brunno Ferreira was scheduled for this event. However, on June 30, Aliskerov withdrew from the fight due to a broken toe and was replaced by promotional newcomer Jackson McVey.

== Results ==
Main card
Weight class				Method	Round	Time	Notes
Lightweight	Max Holloway (c)	def.	Dustin Poirier	Decision (unanimous) (48–47, 49–46, 49–46)	5	5:00	(Note: For the symbolic "BMF" title.)
Middleweight	Paulo Costa	def.	Roman Kopylov	Decision (unanimous) (30–27, 30–27, 29–28)	3	5:00
Welterweight	Daniel Rodriguez	def.	Kevin Holland	Decision (unanimous) (29–28, 29–28, 29–28)	3	5:00
Featherweight	Patrício Pitbull	def.	Dan Ige	Decision (unanimous) (29–28, 29–28, 29–28)	3	5:00
Lightweight	Michael Johnson	def.	Daniel Zellhuber	Decision (unanimous) (29–28, 29–28, 29–28)	3	5:00
Preliminary card (ESPN / ESPN+ / Disney+)
Bantamweight	Vinicius Oliveira	def.	Kyler Phillips	Decision (unanimous) (29–28, 29–28, 29–28)	3	5:00
Middleweight	Brendan Allen	def.	Marvin Vettori	Decision (unanimous) (30–27, 30–27, 29–28)	3	5:00
Welterweight	Nikolay Veretennikov	def.	Francisco Prado	Decision (split) (28–29, 29–28, 29–28)	3	5:00
Middleweight	Ateba Gautier	def.	Robert Valentin	TKO (punches)	1	1:10
Early preliminary card (ESPN2 / ESPN+ / Disney+ / UFC Fight Pass)
Welterweight	Islam Dulatov	def.	Adam Fugitt	KO (punches)	1	4:06
Light Heavyweight	Jimmy Crute	def.	Marcin Prachnio	Submission (armbar)	1	4:41
Heavyweight	Ryan Spann	def.	Łukasz Brzeski	Submission (guillotine choke)	1	2:37
Middleweight	Brunno Ferreira	def.	Jackson McVey	Submission (armbar)	1	3:35
Women's Flyweight	Carli Judice	def.	Nicolle Caliari	TKO (knee to the body and punches)	3	1:30

== Bonus awards ==
The following fighters received $50,000 bonuses.

- Fight of the Night: Brendan Allen vs. Marvin Vettori
- Performance of the Night: Ateba Gautier, Islam Dulatov, and Carli Judice

== See also ==
- 2025 in UFC
- List of current UFC fighters
- List of UFC events
