= UFC 320 =

Mixed martial arts event in 2025

UFC 320: Ankalaev vs. Pereira 2
- The poster for UFC 320: Ankalaev vs. Pereira 2
- Promotion: Ultimate Fighting Championship
- Date: October 4, 2025
- Venue: T-Mobile Arena
- City: Paradise, Nevada, United States
- Attendance: 19,081
- Total gate: $8,840,134

Event chronology
UFC Fight Night: Ulberg vs. Reyes	UFC 320: Ankalaev vs. Pereira 2	UFC Fight Night: Oliveira vs. Gamrot

UFC 320: Ankalaev vs. Pereira 2 was a mixed martial arts event produced by the Ultimate Fighting Championship that took place on October 4, 2025, at the T-Mobile Arena in Paradise, Nevada, part of the Las Vegas Valley, United States.

== Background ==
This event was originally expected to take place in Guadalajara, Mexico on September 13 and serve as the third annual "Noche UFC" event commemorating Mexico's independence day. However, due to the construction of Arena Guadalajara being stalled, the card was moved to San Antonio, Texas and shifted to a Fight Night. The promotion announced a week later that the numbered event would be moved to October and took place in Las Vegas.

A UFC Light Heavyweight Championship rematch between current champion Magomed Ankalaev and former champion Alex Pereira (also former UFC Middleweight Champion, former Glory Middleweight and Light Heavyweight Champion) headlined the event. They previously competed at UFC 313 where Ankalaev defeated Pereira for the championship via unanimous decision. Former champion (also the inaugural Rizin Light Heavyweight Champion) Jiří Procházka, who met former title challenger Khalil Rountree Jr. at the event, served as backup and potential replacement for this fight.

In addition, a UFC Bantamweight Championship bout between current champion Merab Dvalishvili and former interim title challenger Cory Sandhagen co-headlined the event.

A featherweight bout between Daniel Santos and Yoo Joo-sang was scheduled for UFC Fight Night: Ulberg vs. Reyes a week before, but it was eventually moved to this event due to undisclosed reasons.

Ateba Gautier and former LFA Middleweight Champion Osman Diaz were scheduled to meet in a middleweight bout at this event. However, Diaz pulled out from the event due to a medical issue and was replaced by promotional newcomer Tre'ston Vines.

At the weigh-ins, The Ultimate Fighter: Heavy Hitters featherweight winner Macy Chiasson weighed in at 137.5 pounds, one and a half pounds over the women's bantamweight non-title fight limit. The bout proceeded at catchweight and she was fined a percentage of her purse, which went to her opponent former Invicta FC Bantamweight Champion and UFC Women's Featherweight Championship challenger Yana Santos. The featherweight bout between Daniel Santos and Yoo Joo-sang was also changed to a catchweight bout of 153 pounds.

== Event ==
=== Main card ===
==== Procházka vs. Rountree Jr. ====
Prior to the fight, commentators generally agreed that the fight was a tossup, with both fighters noted as having significant knockout power. The fight saw Rountree dominate the first two rounds, outstriking Procházka, who attempted to engage with little success. Procházka turned the tide of the fight by the third round by managing to land several combinations on Rountree, finishing him off with a spinning elbow and repeated punches until Rountree was knocked out cold.

==== Dvalishvili vs. Sandhagen ====
The fight was predicted by most outlets to be another win by Dvalishvili, noting his wrestling expertise and impressive cardio. However, Sandhagen's striking ability and aggression was noted as potentially being able to change the tide of the fight.

The bout started out with a close round where Sandhagen saw some success against Dvalishvili. Dvalishvili controlled the bout against Sandhagen starting in the second round, dropping Sandhagen and landing over 8 takedowns over 13 attempts. Dvalishvili later expressed surprise he could not finish Sandhagen in the second round, where he landed over 33 strikes compared to just 2 by Sandhagen.

==== Ankalaev vs. Pereira ====
Before the fight, many commentators and sites predicted a similar result to the previous fight, where Ankalaev out-struck Pereira standing up. Pereira claimed that he only fought at "40 percent" of his strength in the previous fight, dealing with an injured hand.

Contrary to predictions of a close match, the fight saw Pereira immediately dominating Ankalaev, backing him to the fence and attacking him with calf kicks and a right hand. After being hit with a right hand, Ankalaev unsuccessfully shot for a takedown, leading Pereira to bombard him with elbows and punches until the fight was ruled a technical knockout eighty seconds in.

== Results ==
Main card
Weight class				Method	Round	Time	Notes
Light Heavyweight	Alex Pereira	def.	Magomed Ankalaev (c)	TKO (punches and elbows)	1	1:20	(Note: For the UFC Light Heavyweight Championship.)
Bantamweight	Merab Dvalishvili (c)	def.	Cory Sandhagen	Decision (unanimous) (49–45, 49–45, 49–46)	5	5:00	(Note: For the UFC Bantamweight Championship.)
Light Heavyweight	Jiří Procházka	def.	Khalil Rountree Jr.	KO (punches)	3	3:04
Featherweight	Youssef Zalal	def.	Josh Emmett	Submission (armbar)	1	1:38
Middleweight	Joe Pyfer	def.	Abusupiyan Magomedov	Submission (face crank)	2	1:46
Preliminary card (ESPNEWS / ESPN+ / Disney+ / FX)
Middleweight	Ateba Gautier	def.	Tre'ston Vines	KO (elbows and punches)	1	1:41
Catchweight (153 lb)	Daniel Santos	def.	Yoo Joo-sang	TKO (punches)	2	0:21
Bantamweight	Jakub Wikłacz	def.	Patchy Mix	Decision (split) (29–28, 28–29, 29–28)	3	5:00
Middleweight	Edmen Shahbazyan	def.	André Muniz	KO (punches and elbows)	1	4:58
Early preliminary card (ESPN+ / Disney+ / FX / UFC Fight Pass)
Welterweight	Punahele Soriano	def.	Nikolay Veretennikov	Decision (unanimous) (30–27, 30–27, 30–27)	3	5:00
Catchweight (137.5 lb)	Yana Santos	def.	Macy Chiasson	Decision (unanimous) (29–28, 29–28, 29–28)	3	5:00
Bantamweight	Farid Basharat	def.	Chris Gutiérrez	Decision (unanimous) (29–28, 29–28, 29–28)	3	5:00
Welterweight	Ramiz Brahimaj	def.	Austin Vanderford	Submission (guillotine choke)	2	2:24
Women's Flyweight	Veronica Hardy	def.	Brogan Walker	Decision (unanimous) (30–27, 30–27, 30–27)	3	5:00

== Bonus awards ==
The following fighters received $50,000 bonuses.

- Fight of the Night: Jiří Procházka vs. Khalil Rountree Jr.
- Performance of the Night: Alex Pereira, Jiří Procházka, and Joe Pyfer

== Aftermath ==
This event won the UFC Honors 2025 Event of the Year award as voted by the fans.

== See also ==
- 2025 in UFC
- List of current UFC fighters
- List of UFC events
