= Ateba Gautier =

Cameroonian mixed martial artist

- Born: Ateba Abega Gautier; 10 April 2002 (age 24); Douala, Cameroon
- Other names: The Silent Assassin The Storm
- Height: 6 ft 4 in (193 cm)
- Weight: 185 lb (84 kg; 13 st 3 lb)
- Division: Middleweight
- Reach: 81 in (206 cm)
- Fighting out of: Manchester, England
- Team: Manchester Top Team
- Years active: 2021–present

Mixed martial arts record
- Total: 13
- Wins: 11
- By knockout: 9
- By decision: 2
- Losses: 2
- By knockout: 1
- By decision: 1

Other information
- Occupation: Mixed martial artist
- Mixed martial arts record from Sherdog

Ateba Abega Gautier (born 10 April 2002) is a Cameroonian professional mixed martial artist currently competing in the middleweight division of the Ultimate Fighting Championship (UFC).

== Early life ==
Gautier was born on April 10, 2002, and raised in Douala, Cameroon, in a neighborhood where violence was common. As a teenager he frequently became involved in street fights, which he has described as a way to gain respect and avoid being bullied. He has recalled several dangerous encounters during this period, including being stabbed with a screwdriver in one altercation.

He began training in combat sports at the age of 17 as a way to stay off the streets. Gautier initially trained at the Mboa Sports Association, where he and another athlete were supported as prospects with the long‑term goal of reaching the UFC. He did not grow up with knowledge of mixed martial arts; he started practicing sambo at 18 and transitioned to MMA at 19 at the encouragement of his coach.

Before turning professional, Gautier competed in amateur combat sports, earning a silver medal at the 2024 African Sambo Championships in the 88kg division and winning the UAE Young Muay Thai Championship. On 10 March 2022, he left Cameroon for Manchester, England, where he joined Manchester Top Team under coach Carl Prince to pursue full‑time training.

== Mixed martial arts career ==
=== Early career ===
Gautier made his professional debut in 2021, competing in regional promotions in Africa and Europe. His early career included several knockout victories, and he suffered his first professional defeat by split decision in 2022.

=== Dana White's Contender Series ===
On 17 September 2024, Gautier competed on Dana White's Contender Series, where he defeated Yura Naito by technical knockout in the second round. The victory earned him a contract with the UFC.

=== Ultimate Fighting Championship ===
Gautier made his UFC debut on 29 March 2025 at UFC on ESPN 64, where he defeated José Medina by first-round knockout. This fight earned him his first Performance of the Night award.

Gautier was originally scheduled to face Robert Valentin on 12 July 2025 at UFC on ESPN 70. However, the bout was moved to 19 July 2025 at UFC 318 for undisclosed reasons where he won the bout by technical knockout early in the first round. This fight earned him another Performance of the Night award.

Gautier was originally scheduled to face former LFA Middleweight Champion Osman Diaz on 4 October 2025 at UFC 320. However, Diaz pulled out from the event due to a medical issue and was replaced by promotional newcomer Tre'ston Vines. Gautier won the bout by knockout in the first round via elbows and punches.

Gautier faced Andrey Pulyaev on 24 January 2026, at UFC 324 and won the bout by unanimous decision.

Gautier ended up facing Osman Diaz on 9 May 2026 at UFC 328. He won the fight via technical knockout in round two.

Gautier faced Roman Kopylov on 3 October 2026 at UFC 332. He lost the fight via knockout in the first round.

== Personal life ==
Gautier is pursuing a degree in geology alongside his fighting career. He comes from a large family in Cameroon, where his brothers help care for his mother while he trains abroad. His nickname, Silent Assassin, was given by his coach due to his quiet demeanor outside competition. He has since changed his nickname to The Storm. He has also been referred to as Mini Ngannou due to sharing a Cameroonian background and having devastating knockout power.

Gautier has cited teammate Lerone Murphy as a major influence and mentor.

== Championships and accomplishments ==
=== Mixed martial arts ===
- Ultimate Fighting Championship
  - Performance of the Night (Two times) vs. José Medina and Robert Valentin
  - UFC Honors Awards
    - 2025: Fan's Choice Debut of the Year Nominee vs. José Medina
  - UFC.com Awards
    - 2025: Ranked #2 Newcomer of the Year

== Mixed martial arts record ==
Professional record breakdown
13 matches	11 wins	2 losses
By knockout	9	1
By decision	2	1

Res.	Record	Opponent	Method	Event	Date	Round	Time	Location	Notes
Loss	11–2	Roman Kopylov	KO (punches)	UFC 332	3 October 2026	1	3:12	Salt Lake City, Utah, United States	
Win	11–1	Osman Diaz	TKO (punches)	UFC 328	9 May 2026	2	1:10	Newark, New Jersey, United States	
Win	10–1	Andrey Pulyaev	Decision (unanimous)	UFC 324	24 January 2026	3	5:00	Las Vegas, Nevada, United States	
Win	9–1	Tre'ston Vines	KO (elbows and punches)	UFC 320	4 October 2025	1	1:41	Las Vegas, Nevada, United States	
Win	8–1	Robert Valentin	TKO (punches)	UFC 318	19 July 2025	1	1:10	New Orleans, Louisiana, United States	Performance of the Night.
Win	7–1	José Medina	KO (punches and knee)	UFC on ESPN: Moreno vs. Erceg	29 March 2025	1	3:32	Mexico City, Mexico	Performance of the Night.
Win	6–1	Yura Naito	TKO (punches)	Dana White's Contender Series 72	17 September 2024	2	4:00	Las Vegas, Nevada, United States	
Win	5–1	Carlos Antonio de Souza	TKO (punches)	Fight KLB: Series 1	2 December 2023	1	5:00	Manchester, England	
Win	4–1	Vuk Lekic	KO (head kick)	Titan FC 82	2 June 2023	1	1:58	Novi Sad, Serbia	
Win	3–1	Yu-Joe Lewis Lai	TKO (punches and knee)	Full Contact Contender 33	25 March 2023	1	2:10	Manchester, England	
Win	2–1	Jan Lysak	TKO (punches)	Vida FC 3	30 July 2022	1	4:38	Manchester, England	Light Heavyweight bout.
Loss	1–1	Glenn Williams	Decision (split)	Budo FC 50	23 July 2022	3	5:00	Swansea, Wales	Middleweight debut.
Win	1–0	Israel Mano	Decision (unanimous)	Africa MMA Open Championships	15 May 2021	3	5:00	Yaoundé, Cameroon	Light Heavyweight debut.

== See also ==
- List of current UFC fighters
- List of male mixed martial artists
