= UFC 321 =

Mixed martial arts event in 2025

UFC 321: Aspinall vs. Gane
- The poster for UFC 321: Aspinall vs. Gane
- Promotion: Ultimate Fighting Championship
- Date: October 25, 2025
- Venue: Etihad Arena
- City: Abu Dhabi, United Arab Emirates
- Attendance: 13,220
- Total gate: Not announced

Event chronology
| UFC Fight Night: de Ridder vs. Allen | UFC 321: Aspinall vs. Gane | UFC Fight Night: Garcia vs. Onama |

UFC 321: Aspinall vs. Gane was a mixed martial arts event produced by the Ultimate Fighting Championship that took place on October 25, 2025, at the Etihad Arena in Abu Dhabi, United Arab Emirates.

== Background ==
The event marked the promotion's 22nd visit to Abu Dhabi and first since UFC on ABC: Whittaker vs. de Ridder in July 2025.

A UFC Heavyweight Championship bout between current champion Tom Aspinall and former interim champion Ciryl Gane headlined the event.

A UFC Women's Strawweight Championship bout for the vacant title between former Invicta FC Strawweight Champion Virna Jandiroba and Mackenzie Dern took place in the co-main event. Current two-time champion Zhang Weili vacated her title in order to challenge for the UFC Women's Flyweight Championship. The pairing previously met at UFC 256 in December 2020 which Dern won by unanimous decision.

A bantamweight bout between former UFC Bantamweight Championship challenger Umar Nurmagomedov and Mario Bautista took place at this event. They were originally reported to be competing in the main event of UFC Fight Night: de Ridder vs. Allen one week prior but were moved to this event for unknown reasons.

Abdul-Kareem Al-Selwady and Matheus Camilo were expected to meet in a lightweight bout on the preliminary card, but Al-Selwady pulled out less than 48 hours before the event and the pairing was scrapped.

At the weigh-ins, two fighters missed weight:

- José Miguel Delgado weighed in at 147 pounds, one pound over the featherweight non-title fight limit.
- Azat Maksum weighed in at 129 pounds, three pounds over the flyweight non-title fight limit.

Delgado and Maksum's bouts proceeded at catchweight. Both fighters were fined a percentage of their individual purses which went to their opponents Nathaniel Wood (20 percent) and Mitch Raposo (30 percent), respectively.

== Results ==
Main card
| Weight class | | | | Method | Round | Time | Notes |
|---|---|---|---|---|---|---|---|
| Heavyweight | Tom Aspinall (c) | vs. | Ciryl Gane | NC (accidental eye poke) | 1 | 4:35 | (Note: For the UFC Heavyweight Championship. Accidental eye poke rendered Aspinall unable to continue.) |
| Women's Strawweight | Mackenzie Dern | def. | Virna Jandiroba | Decision (unanimous) (48–47, 48–47, 49–46) | 5 | 5:00 | (Note: For the vacant UFC Women's Strawweight Championship.) |
| Bantamweight | Umar Nurmagomedov | def. | Mario Bautista | Decision (unanimous) (30–27, 30–27, 30–27) | 3 | 5:00 |
| Heavyweight | Alexander Volkov | def. | Jailton Almeida | Decision (split) (28–29, 29–28, 29–28) | 3 | 5:00 |
| Light Heavyweight | Azamat Murzakanov | def. | Aleksandar Rakić | TKO (punches) | 1 | 3:11 |
Preliminary card (ESPN+ / Disney+ / FX)
| Lightweight | Quillan Salkilld | def. | Nasrat Haqparast | KO (head kick) | 1 | 2:30 |
| Middleweight | Ikram Aliskerov | def. | Park Jun-yong | Decision (unanimous) (30–27, 30–27, 30–27) | 3 | 5:00 |
| Lightweight | Ľudovít Klein | def. | Mateusz Rębecki | Decision (majority) (29–28, 28–27, 28–28) | 3 | 5:00 |
| Heavyweight | Valter Walker | def. | Louie Sutherland | Submission (heel hook) | 1 | 1:24 |
| Catchweight (147 lb) | Nathaniel Wood | def. | José Miguel Delgado | Decision (unanimous) (29–28, 29–28, 29–28) | 3 | 5:00 |
| Heavyweight | Hamdy Abdelwahab | def. | Chris Barnett | Decision (unanimous) (29–26, 29–27, 29–27) | 3 | 5:00 | (Note: Abdelwahab was deducted one point in round 1 due to an illegal elbow to back of the head.) |
| Catchweight (129 lb) | Mitch Raposo | def. | Azat Maksum | Decision (unanimous) (30–26, 29–27, 29–27) | 3 | 5:00 | (Note: Maksum was deducted one point in round 3 due to grabbing the fence.) |
| Women's Strawweight | Mizuki Inoue | def. | Jaqueline Amorim | Decision (unanimous) (30–27, 30–27, 29–28) | 3 | 5:00 |

== Bonus awards ==
The following fighters received $50,000 bonuses.

- Fight of the Night: Ľudovít Klein vs. Mateusz Rębecki
- Performance of the Night: Quillan Salkilld and Valter Walker

== See also ==
- 2025 in UFC
- List of current UFC fighters
- List of UFC events
