= UFC on ESPN: Lewis vs. Teixeira =

Mixed martial arts event in 2025

- The poster for UFC on ESPN: Lewis vs. Teixeira
- Promotion: Ultimate Fighting Championship
- Date: July 12, 2025
- Venue: Bridgestone Arena
- City: Nashville, Tennessee, United States
- Attendance: 17,007
- Total gate: $2,189,826

Event chronology
UFC 317: Topuria vs. Oliveira	UFC on ESPN: Lewis vs. Teixeira	UFC 318: Holloway vs. Poirier 3

UFC on ESPN: Lewis vs. Teixeira (also known as UFC on ESPN 70) was a mixed martial arts event produced by the Ultimate Fighting Championship that took place on July 12, 2025, at Bridgestone Arena in Nashville, Tennessee, United States.

== Background ==
The event marked the promotion's seventh visit to Nashville and first since UFC on ESPN: Sandhagen vs. Font in August 2023.

A heavyweight bout between former UFC Heavyweight Championship challenger Derrick Lewis and undefeated prospect Tallison Teixeira headlined the event.

Junior Tafa faced Tuco Tokkos in a light heavyweight bout at this event. They were originally scheduled to compete at UFC on ESPN: Sandhagen vs. Figueiredo in May, but both Tafa and Tokkos were forced to withdraw due to an injury.

A middleweight bout between Ateba Gautier and Robert Valentin was scheduled for this event. However, the bout was moved to UFC 318 one week later for unknown reasons.

== Results ==
Main card (ESPN / ESPN+)
Weight class				Method	Round	Time	Notes
Heavyweight	Derrick Lewis	def.	Tallison Teixeira	TKO (punches)	1	0:35
Welterweight	Gabriel Bonfim	def.	Stephen Thompson	Decision (split) (28–29, 29–28, 29–28)	3	5:00
Featherweight	Steve Garcia	def.	Calvin Kattar	Decision (unanimous) (30–27, 30–27, 30–27)	3	5:00
Featherweight	Morgan Charrière	def.	Nate Landwehr	KO (punches)	3	0:27
Heavyweight	Vitor Petrino	def.	Austen Lane	Submission (rear-naked choke)	1	4:16
Light Heavyweight	Tuco Tokkos	def.	Junior Tafa	Submission (arm-triangle choke)	2	4:25
Preliminary card (ESPN / ESPN+)
Welterweight	Chris Curtis	def.	Max Griffin	Decision (split) (28–29, 29–28, 29–28)	3	5:00
Welterweight	Jake Matthews	def.	Chidi Njokuani	Submission (rear-naked choke)	1	1:09
Women's Flyweight	Eduarda Moura	def.	Lauren Murphy	Decision (unanimous) (29–28, 29–28, 29–28)	3	5:00
Heavyweight	Valter Walker	def.	Kennedy Nzechukwu	Submission (inverted heel hook)	1	0:54
Lightweight	Mike Davis	def.	Mitch Ramirez	TKO (flying knee and punches)	2	4:08
Women's Strawweight	Fatima Kline	def.	Melissa Martinez	TKO (head kick and punches)	3	2:36

== Bonus awards ==
The following fighters received $50,000 bonuses.

- Fight of the Night: Morgan Charrière vs. Nate Landwehr
- Performance of the Night: Valter Walker and Fatima Kline

== See also ==
- List of UFC events
- List of current UFC fighters
- 2025 in UFC
