= Max Griffin =

American mixed martial arts fighter

- Born: November 29, 1985 (age 40); Santa Barbara, California, U.S.
- Nickname: Pain
- Height: 5 ft 11 in (180 cm)
- Weight: 170 lb (77 kg; 12 st 2 lb)
- Division: Middleweight; Welterweight
- Reach: 76 in (193 cm)
- Fighting out of: Sacramento, California, U.S.
- Team: Marinoble's Martial Arts; MMA Gold
- Trainer: Bo Sandoval (strength and conditioning coach); Dave Marinoble (Marinoble's fighting system)
- Rank: 1st degree black belt in Kickboxing; Black belt in Bok Fu; Black belt in Marinoble's fighting system
- Years active: 2009–present

Mixed martial arts record
- Total: 33
- Wins: 20
- By knockout: 9
- By submission: 2
- By decision: 9
- Losses: 13
- By knockout: 1
- By submission: 1
- By decision: 11

Other information
- Website: maxgriffin.com
- Mixed martial arts record from Sherdog

Max Griffin (born November 29, 1985) is an American professional mixed martial artist. Griffin competed in the Welterweight division for the Ultimate Fighting Championship (UFC). A professional since 2009, Griffin has also competed for Tachi Palace Fights, where he was the welterweight champion.

== Background ==
Griffin was born in Santa Barbara, California, United States. He has a black belt in Bok Fu (a blend of Kenpo, Tae-Kwon-Do, and Kung Fu).

== Mixed martial arts career ==
=== Early career ===
Griffin started his MMA career on October 10, 2009. He fought for many promoters, notably Gladiator Challenge, West Coast Fighting Championship, the Warriors Cage, and Tachi Palace Fights in California. He was the former West Coast Fighting Championship welterweight and middleweight champion. Griffin was also the Tachi Palace Fight welterweight champion, and he amassed a record of 12–2 prior joining UFC.

=== The Ultimate Fighter ===
Griffin was selected as one of the contestants for The Ultimate Fighter 16 in 2012; he lost to Matt Secor and was eliminated during the entry round.

=== Ultimate Fighting Championship ===
Griffin made his promotional debut on August 20, 2016, at UFC 202 against Colby Covington. He lost the fight via TKO in the third round.

Griffin faced Erick Montano on his next fight at The Ultimate Fighter Latin America 3 Finale: dos Anjos vs. Ferguson on November 5, 2016. He won the fight and claimed his first UFC win via knockout in the first round.

Griffin was expected to face Sérgio Moraes on March 11, 2017, at UFC Fight Night 106. He was replaced by Davi Ramos as Griffin pulled out of the fight, citing an undisclosed injury.

Griffin faced Elizeu Zaleski dos Santos on October 28, 2017, at UFC Fight Night 119. He lost the fight via unanimous decision. Despite the loss, Griffin was awarded the Fight of the Night bonus award.

In the last bout of his contract, Griffin faced Mike Perry on February 24, 2018, at UFC on Fox 28. He won the fight via unanimous decision.

Griffin faced Curtis Millender on July 7, 2018, at UFC 226. He lost the fight via unanimous decision.

Griffin faced Thiago Alves at UFC Fight Night 144 on February 2, 2019. He lost the back-and-forth fight via split decision. Conversely, 16 of 18 media outlets scored the bout in favor of Griffin.

Griffin faced Zelim Imadaev on April 13, 2019, at UFC 236. He won the fight via majority decision. Imadaev was deducted a point in the first round for grabbing the fence. After the fight, Griffin signed a new, five-fight contract with the UFC.

Griffin faced Alex Morono on October 12, 2019, at UFC Fight Night 161. He lost the fight via unanimous decision.

Griffin faced Alex Oliveira on March 7, 2020, at UFC 248. He lost the back-and-forth fight via split decision.

Griffin faced Ramiz Brahimaj on November 7, 2020, at UFC on ESPN 17. He won the fight via technical knockout due to a doctor stoppage after Brahimaj's ear was split open in round three.

Griffin faced Song Kenan on March 20, 2021, at UFC on ESPN 21. He won the fight via knockout in round one. This win earned him the Performance of the Night award.

Griffin faced Carlos Condit on July 10, 2021, at UFC 264. He won the fight via unanimous decision.

Griffin faced Neil Magny on March 26, 2022, at UFC on ESPN 33. He lost the fight via split decision.

Griffin faced Tim Means on October 29, 2022, at UFC Fight Night 213. He won the fight via a split decision.

Griffin faced Michael Morales on July 1, 2023, at UFC on ESPN 48. He lost the fight via unanimous decision.

Griffin faced Jeremiah Wells on February 10, 2024, at UFC Fight Night 236. He won the fight via split decision.

Griffin faced Michael Chiesa on December 7, 2024, at UFC 310. He lost the fight via a rear-naked choke submission in the third round, leading to the first submission loss in his career.

Griffin faced Chris Curtis on July 12, 2025, at UFC on ESPN 70 in Nashville, Tennessee. He lost the fight by split decision.

Griffin faced Victor Valenzuela on April 25, 2026 at UFC Fight Night 274. He lost the fight by unanimous decision.

On May 28, 2026, Griffin announced that he has officially been released by the UFC.

== Personal life ==
Max and his fiancée Anastasia have a son.

== Championships and accomplishments ==
=== Mixed martial arts ===
- Ultimate Fighting Championship
  - Fight of the Night (One time) vs. Elizeu Zaleski dos Santos
  - Performance of the Night (One time) vs. Song Kenan
- West Coast Fighting Championship
  - West Coast Fighting Championship Welterweight Champion (One time) vs. Randall Wallace
  - West Coast Fighting Championship Middleweight Champion (One time) vs. David Mitchell
- Tachi Palace Fight
  - Tachi Palace Fight Welterweight Champion (One time) vs. Riky Legere

== Mixed martial arts record ==
Professional record breakdown
33 matches	20 wins	13 losses
By knockout	9	1
By submission	2	1
By decision	9	11

Res.	Record	Opponent	Method	Event	Date	Round	Time	Location	Notes
Loss	20–13	Victor Valenzuela	Decision (unanimous)	UFC Fight Night: Sterling vs. Zalal	April 25, 2026	3	5:00	Las Vegas, Nevada, United States	
Loss	20–12	Chris Curtis	Decision (split)	UFC on ESPN: Lewis vs. Teixeira	July 12, 2025	3	5:00	Nashville, Tennessee, United States	
Loss	20–11	Michael Chiesa	Submission (rear-naked choke)	UFC 310	December 7, 2024	3	1:56	Las Vegas, Nevada, United States	
Win	20–10	Jeremiah Wells	Decision (split)	UFC Fight Night: Hermansson vs. Pyfer	February 10, 2024	3	5:00	Las Vegas, Nevada, United States	
Loss	19–10	Michael Morales	Decision (unanimous)	UFC on ESPN: Strickland vs. Magomedov	July 1, 2023	3	5:00	Las Vegas, Nevada, United States	
Win	19–9	Tim Means	Decision (split)	UFC Fight Night: Kattar vs. Allen	October 29, 2022	3	5:00	Las Vegas, Nevada, United States	
Loss	18–9	Neil Magny	Decision (split)	UFC on ESPN: Blaydes vs. Daukaus	March 26, 2022	3	5:00	Columbus, Ohio, United States	
Win	18–8	Carlos Condit	Decision (unanimous)	UFC 264	July 10, 2021	3	5:00	Las Vegas, Nevada, United States	
Win	17–8	Song Kenan	KO (punches)	UFC on ESPN: Brunson vs. Holland	March 20, 2021	1	2:20	Las Vegas, Nevada, United States	Performance of the Night.
Win	16–8	Ramiz Brahimaj	TKO (doctor stoppage)	UFC on ESPN: Santos vs. Teixeira	November 7, 2020	3	2:03	Las Vegas, Nevada, United States	
Loss	15–8	Alex Oliveira	Decision (split)	UFC 248	March 7, 2020	3	5:00	Las Vegas, Nevada, United States	
Loss	15–7	Alex Morono	Decision (unanimous)	UFC Fight Night: Joanna vs. Waterson	October 12, 2019	3	5:00	Tampa, Florida, United States	
Win	15–6	Zelim Imadaev	Decision (majority)	UFC 236	April 13, 2019	3	5:00	Atlanta, Georgia, United States	Imadaev was deducted one point in round 1 due to grabbing the cage.
Loss	14–6	Thiago Alves	Decision (split)	UFC Fight Night: Assunção vs. Moraes 2	February 2, 2019	3	5:00	Fortaleza, Brazil	
Loss	14–5	Curtis Millender	Decision (unanimous)	UFC 226	July 7, 2018	3	5:00	Las Vegas, Nevada, United States	
Win	14–4	Mike Perry	Decision (unanimous)	UFC on Fox: Emmett vs. Stephens	February 24, 2018	3	5:00	Orlando, Florida, United States	
Loss	13–4	Elizeu Zaleski dos Santos	Decision (unanimous)	UFC Fight Night: Brunson vs. Machida	October 28, 2017	3	5:00	São Paulo, Brazil	Fight of the Night.
Win	13–3	Erick Montaño	TKO (punches)	The Ultimate Fighter Latin America 3 Finale: dos Anjos vs. Ferguson	November 5, 2016	1	0:54	Mexico City, Mexico	
Loss	12–3	Colby Covington	TKO (punches)	UFC 202	August 20, 2016	3	2:18	Las Vegas, Nevada, United States	
Win	12–2	David Mitchell	KO (punch)	West Coast FC 16	January 23, 2016	1	0:43	Sacramento, California, United States	Catchweight (175 lb) bout.
Win	11–2	Randall Wallace	TKO (punch)	West Coast FC 15	October 10, 2015	4	1:44	Sacramento, California, United States	Defended the WCFC Welterweight Championship.
Loss	10–2	Chidi Njokuani	Decision (split)	Tachi Palace Fights 23	May 7, 2015	5	5:00	Lemoore, California, United States	Lost the TPF Welterweight Championship.
Win	10–1	Ricky Legere Jr.	KO (punch)	Tachi Palace Fights 21	November 6, 2014	1	3:21	Lemoore, California, United States	Won the TPF Welterweight Championship.
Win	9–1	Randall Wallace	Submission (rear-naked choke)	Tachi Palace Fights 19	June 19, 2014	2	2:20	Lemoore, California, United States	
Win	8–1	Waachiim Spiritwolf	Decision (split)	The Warriors Cage 19	January 25, 2014	3	5:00	Porterville, California, United States	Return to Welterweight.
Win	7–1	Fernando Gonzalez	Decision (split)	West Coast FC 7	November 16, 2013	5	5:00	Sacramento, California, United States	Middleweight debut. Won the WCFC Middleweight Championship.
Win	6–1	Kito Andrew	Decision (unanimous)	West Coast FC 5	May 3, 2013	5	5:00	Sacramento, California, United States	Won the WCFC Welterweight Championship.
Win	5–1	Richard Rigmaden	Submission (anaconda choke)	West Coast FC 4	January 18, 2013	1	0:56	Sacramento, California, United States	
Loss	4–1	Justin Baesman	Decision (split)	West Coast FC 2	June 9, 2012	5	5:00	Yuba City, California, United States	
Win	4–0	Jaime Jara	KO (punch)	West Coast FC 1	January 7, 2012	1	0:56	Placerville, California, United States	
Win	3–0	Joshua Miranda	Decision (unanimous)	Gladiator Challenge: Impulse	November 13, 2010	3	5:00	Placerville, California, United States	
Win	2–0	Aaron Hamilton	TKO (punches)	Gladiator Challenge: Undisputed	September 18, 2010	2	2:20	Placerville, California, United States	
Win	1–0	Kino Vuittonet	TKO (punches)	Gladiator Challenge: First Strike	October 10, 2009	1	0:25	Placerville, California, United States	Welterweight debut.

== See also ==
- List of male mixed martial artists
