= Michael Morales (fighter) =

Ecuadorian mixed martial artist (born 1999)

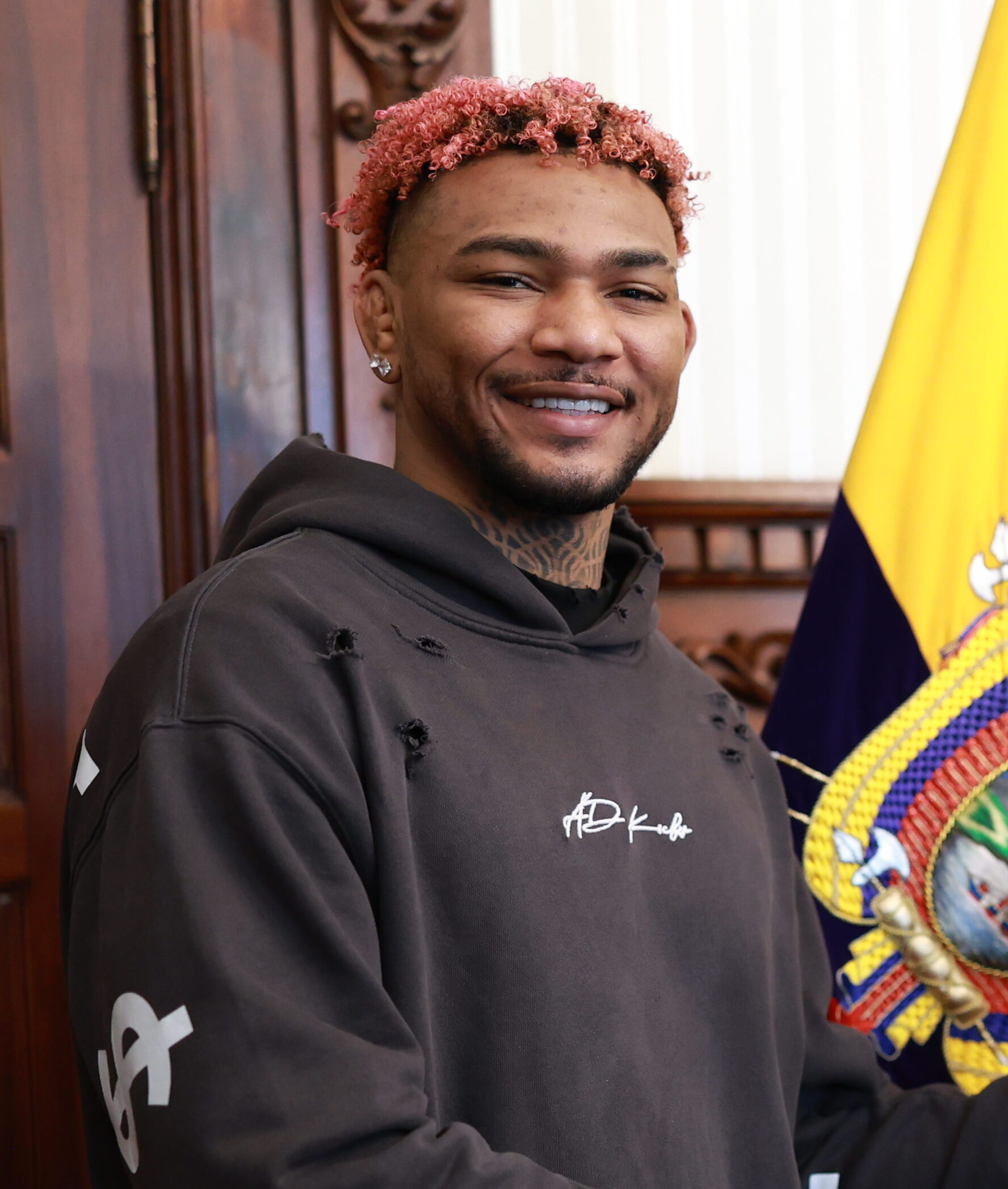
- Morales in 2025
- Born: Michael Jonathan Morales Hurtado; June 24, 1999 (age 27); Pasaje, El Oro, Ecuador
- Height: 6 ft 0 in (1.83 m)
- Weight: 170 lb (77 kg)
- Division: Welterweight
- Reach: 79 in (201 cm)
- Fighting out of: Tijuana, Baja California, Mexico
- Team: Xtreme Fitness Machala; Entram Gym
- Years active: 2017–present

Mixed martial arts record
- Total: 19
- Wins: 19
- By knockout: 14
- By submission: 1
- By decision: 4
- Losses: 0

Other information
- Mixed martial arts record from Sherdog

Michael Jonathan Morales Hurtado (born June 24, 1999) is an Ecuadorian professional mixed martial artist. He currently competes in the Welterweight division of the Ultimate Fighting Championship (UFC). As of February 3, 2026, he is #3 in the Meta UFC welterweight rankings.

== Background ==
Michael Morales was born in 1999 in Pasaje, El Oro, Ecuador. He is the son of judokas, a discipline he has been practicing since he was five years old, with his mother as his first coach. His mother, international judo referee Katty Hurtado, is a third dan judo black belt who retired from competition when she was 42. At the age of 10, he switched from judo to wrestling, where he won several youth tournaments. At the age of 14, his father took him to Víctor Vallejo's academy in Machala, where he began to practice mixed martial arts. After doing MMA as an amateur, he made his professional MMA debut at age 16.

== Mixed martial arts career ==
=== Early career ===
While starting a career in MMA, he juggled a job at a naval boat factory.

In 2021, he began his journey through Mexico, arriving in Tijuana to train at Entram Gym. On March 29, 2021, he signed a contract with Ultimate Warrior Challenge Mexico (UWC).

=== Dana White's Contender Series ===
On September 21, 2021, Morales faced Nikolay Veretennikov for a UFC contract on Dana White's Contender Series: Season 5, Week 4. Morales earned the contract by defeating Veretennikov via unanimous decision.

=== Ultimate Fighting Championship ===
Morales made his UFC debut against Trevin Giles on January 22, 2022, at UFC 270. He won the fight via TKO in the first round.

Morales was scheduled to face Ramiz Brahimaj at UFC 277 on July 30, 2022. However, Brahimaj was forced to withdraw from the event in mid-July due to an undisclosed injury and was replaced by Adam Fugitt. Morales won the fight via TKO in the third round.

Morales was scheduled to face Rinat Fakhretdinov on December 17, 2022, at UFC Fight Night: Cannonier vs. Strickland. However, Morales withdrew due to a toe fracture.

Morales faced Max Griffin on July 1, 2023, at UFC on ESPN 48. He won the fight via unanimous decision.

Morales faced Jake Matthews on November 18, 2023, at UFC Fight Night 232. He won the fight via unanimous decision.

Morales faced Neil Magny on August 24, 2024, at UFC on ESPN 62. He won the fight by technical knockout in the first round. This fight earned him a Performance of the Night award.

Morales was scheduled to face former UFC Welterweight title challenger Gilbert Burns on April 12, 2025, at UFC 314. However, the bout was moved to May 10, 2025, at UFC 315 for unknown reasons. In turn, the bout against Burns was moved to serve as the main event on May 17, 2025, at UFC Fight Night 256. Morales won the fight by technical knockout in the first round. This fight earned him another Performance of the Night award.

Morales faced Sean Brady on November 15, 2025, at UFC 322. He won via technical knockout in the first round. This fight earned him another Performance of the Night award.

Morales served as the backup fighter on August 15, 2026, at UFC 330 for the welterweight championship main event.

As a result of reigning champion Islam Makhachev withdrawing from the scheduled bout against Carlos Prates for undisclosed reasons, Morales is scheduled to compete for the interim UFC Welterweight Championship against Prates on January 30, 2027 at UFC 336.

== Championships and accomplishments ==
=== Mixed martial arts ===
- Ultimate Fighting Championship
  - Performance of the Night (Three times) vs. Neil Magny, Gilbert Burns and Sean Brady
  - UFC Honors Awards
    - 2025: President's Choice Performance of the Year Nominee vs. Sean Brady
  - UFC.com Awards
    - 2022: Ranked #8 Newcomer of the Year
- Oro Fighting Championship
  - OFC Welterweight Champion (One time)
- Extreme MMA
  - Extreme MMA Welterweight Champion (One time)
- Sportsnaut
  - 2025 UFC Fighter of the Year
- MMA Fighting
  - 2025 First Team MMA All-Star
- Uncrowned
  - 2025 #5 Ranked Male Fighter of the Year
  - 2025 #2 Ranked Breakthrough Fighter of the Year

== Mixed martial arts record ==
Professional record breakdown
19 matches	19 wins	0 losses
By knockout	14	0
By submission	1	0
By decision	4	0

Res.	Record	Opponent	Method	Event	Date	Round	Time	Location	Notes
Win	19–0	Sean Brady	TKO (punches)	UFC 322	November 15, 2025	1	3:27	New York City, New York, United States	Performance of the Night.
Win	18–0	Gilbert Burns	TKO (punches)	UFC Fight Night: Burns vs. Morales	May 17, 2025	1	3:39	Las Vegas, Nevada, United States	Performance of the Night.
Win	17–0	Neil Magny	TKO (punches)	UFC on ESPN: Cannonier vs. Borralho	August 24, 2024	1	4:39	Las Vegas, Nevada, United States	Performance of the Night.
Win	16–0	Jake Matthews	Decision (unanimous)	UFC Fight Night: Allen vs. Craig	November 18, 2023	3	5:00	Las Vegas, Nevada, United States	
Win	15–0	Max Griffin	Decision (unanimous)	UFC on ESPN: Strickland vs. Magomedov	July 1, 2023	3	5:00	Las Vegas, Nevada, United States	
Win	14–0	Adam Fugitt	TKO (punches)	UFC 277	July 30, 2022	3	1:09	Dallas, Texas, United States	
Win	13–0	Trevin Giles	TKO (punches)	UFC 270	January 22, 2022	1	4:06	Anaheim, California, United States	
Win	12–0	Nikolay Veretennikov	Decision (unanimous)	Dana White's Contender Series 40	September 21, 2021	3	5:00	Las Vegas, Nevada, United States	
Win	11–0	Miguel Arizmendi	TKO (punches)	UWC Mexico 26	April 30, 2021	2	4:02	Tijuana, Mexico	
Win	10–0	Ricardo Centeno	KO (punches)	Extreme MMA 17	October 3, 2020	1	4:15	Quito, Ecuador	Won the vacant Extreme MMA Welterweight Championship.
Win	9–0	Daniel Luigy Bastidas	TKO (doctor stoppage)	Extreme MMA 16	August 1, 2020	1	2:01	Guayaquil, Ecuador	
Win	8–0	Mario Navarrete	TKO (punches)	Barbarians 5	February 12, 2020	2	2:45	Machala, Ecuador	
Win	7–0	Gregoris Cisneros	Submission (triangle choke)	Barbarians 4	December 14, 2019	1	1:58	Cuenca, Ecuador	
Win	6–0	Erick Zambrano	TKO (punches)	Pasaje Combat 1	November 8, 2019	1	1:55	Pasaje, Ecuador	
Win	5–0	Mathias Salazar	TKO (punches)	Manaba Top Team 2	September 6, 2019	1	1:40	El Guabo, Ecuador	
Win	4–0	Óscar Ravello	TKO (corner stoppage)	Fusion FC 39	July 17, 2019	2	5:00	Lima, Peru	
Win	3–0	Leonardo Blasco	Decision (unanimous)	Troncal FC 2	December 8, 2018	3	5:00	La Troncal, Ecuador	
Win	2–0	Álvaro Vacacela Guerrero	TKO (doctor stoppage)	Oro FC 5	March 24, 2018	1	5:00	Santa Rosa, Ecuador	Won the OFC Welterweight Championship.
Win	1–0	Álvaro Vacacela Guerrero	TKO (punches)	Oro FC 4	August 19, 2017	2	3:15	Pasaje, Ecuador	Welterweight debut.

== See also ==
- List of current UFC fighters
- List of Dana White's Contender Series alumni
- List of male mixed martial artists
- List of undefeated mixed martial artists
