= Valter Walker =

Brazilian mixed martial artist (born 1997)

- Born: Valter Ignacio Silva Souza; December 14, 1997 (age 28); Rio das Ostras, Rio de Janeiro, Brazil
- Nickname: The Clean Monster
- Height: 6 ft 6 in (1.98 m)
- Weight: 244 lb (111 kg; 17.4 st)
- Division: Heavyweight (2020–present)
- Reach: 78.5 in (199 cm)
- Fighting out of: Moscow, Russia
- Team: GOR MMA
- Years active: 2020–present

Mixed martial arts record
- Total: 17
- Wins: 16
- By knockout: 6
- By submission: 6
- By decision: 4
- Losses: 1
- By decision: 1

Other information
- Mixed martial arts record from Sherdog

Valter Ignacio Silva Souza (born December 14, 1997), known as Valter Walker, is a Brazilian professional mixed martial artist. He currently competes in the Heavyweight division of the Ultimate Fighting Championship (UFC). As of September 12, 2026, he is #11 in the Meta UFC heavyweight rankings.

== Mixed martial arts career ==
=== Early career ===
Walker moved to Moscow in 2018 to focus on training and began competing in mixed martial arts professionally in 2020. In his early professional career, Walker compiled an undefeated 11-0 record, competing eight times in Russia, once in his native Brazil and becoming the heavyweight champion in three regional promotions. His record consisted of six wins by knockout, one win by submission and four wins by decision. During this time, Walker fought under his real surname, Ignacio, so as to not garner high expectations from people recognising him from being the younger brother of Johnny Walker.

=== Ultimate Fighting Championship ===
On June 14, 2023, it was reported that Walker had signed with the UFC, and was scheduled to face Jake Collier on September 23 at UFC Fight Night 228. However, Walker later withdrew from the bout for unknown reasons and was replaced by Mohammed Usman.

In his UFC debut, Walker faced Łukasz Brzeski on April 6, 2024, at UFC Fight Night 240. He lost the fight by unanimous decision, marking his first loss in MMA.

Walker faced Junior Tafa on August 17, 2024, at UFC 305. He won the fight by submission in the first round after Tafa screamed in pain due to a heel hook.

Walker faced Don'Tale Mayes on February 15, 2025, at UFC Fight Night 251. He won the fight via heel hook submission in the first round.

Walker faced Kennedy Nzechukwu on July 12, 2025, at UFC on ESPN 70. He won the fight via heel hook submission in the first round, breaking the UFC record for most consecutive heel hook submission victories with three. The win earned him his first Performance of the Night bonus.

Walker was scheduled to face Mohammed Usman on October 11, 2025 at UFC Fight Night 261. However, Usman withdrew from the fight due to a failed drug test and Walker was subsequently rescheduled to fight promotional newcomer Louie Sutherland on October 25 at UFC 321. Walker won the fight via heel hook submission in the first round. With this win, Walker tied Rousimar Palhares for the most heel hook submissions (4) in UFC history, and extended his UFC record for most consecutive heel hook submissions to four. The win earned him the Performance of the Night bonus.

Walker was scheduled to face Marcin Tybura on March 28, 2026 at UFC Fight Night 271. However, Walker withdrew due to a foot fracture.

Walker faced Thomas Petersen on July 25, 2026 at UFC Fight Night 282. He won the fight via a calf slicer submission in the first round. This fight earned him a $100,000 Performance of the Night award.

== Submission grappling career ==
Walker faced Zion Clark in an openweight submission grappling match at Karate Combat 59 on February 13, 2026. Walker won the match by submission with a rear-naked choke.

His fighting style is described as being "aggressive and entertaining", with winning streaks closed by heel hook submissions.

== Championships and accomplishments ==
- Ultimate Fighting Championship
  - Performance of the Night (Three times) vs. Kennedy Nzechukwu, Louie Sutherland and Thomas Petersen
  - Tied (Rousimar Palhares) for most heel hook submissions in UFC history (4)
  - Most consecutive heel hook submissions in UFC history (4)
  - Tied (Demian Maia) for the second longest submission streak in UFC history (5) (behind Royce Gracie)
  - Fourth most submission wins in UFC Heavyweight division history (5)
  - UFC.com Awards
    - 2025: Ranked #5 Submissions of the Year vs. Don'Tale Mayes, Kennedy Nzechukwu, and Louie Sutherland
- Titan FC
  - Heavyweight Championship (One time)
- MMA Series
  - Heavyweight Championship (One time)
- Arena Global MMA
  - Heavyweight Championship (One time)
- MMA Mania
  - 2025 #5 Ranked Submission of the Year vs. Kennedy Nzechukwu
- MMA Fighting
  - 2025 #3 Ranked Breakthrough Fighter of the Year
  - 2025 #2 Ranked Submissions of the Year vs. Don'Tale Mayes, Kennedy Nzechukwu, and Louie Sutherland
  - 2025 Second Team MMA All-Star

== Personal life ==
Walker is the younger half-brother of Johnny Walker, a fellow UFC fighter who competes in the Heavyweight division.

He resides in Moscow, Russia, since 2018 and has a permanent residency permit.

In 2025, Walker became a brand ambassador, along with Diego Lopes and Alexandre Pantoja, as part of the multi-year branding deal between the UFC and Spribe.

== Mixed martial arts record ==
Professional record breakdown
17 matches	16 wins	1 loss
By knockout	6	0
By submission	6	0
By decision	4	1

Res.	Record	Opponent	Method	Event	Date	Round	Time	Location	Notes
Win	16–1	Thomas Petersen	Submission (calf slicer)	UFC Fight Night: Ankalaev vs. Guskov	July 25, 2026	1	1:32	Abu Dhabi, United Arab Emirates	Performance of the Night.
Win	15–1	Louie Sutherland	Submission (heel hook)	UFC 321	October 25, 2025	1	1:24	Abu Dhabi, United Arab Emirates	Performance of the Night.
Win	14–1	Kennedy Nzechukwu	Submission (inverted heel hook)	UFC on ESPN: Lewis vs. Teixeira	July 12, 2025	1	0:54	Nashville, Tennessee, United States	Performance of the Night.
Win	13–1	Don'Tale Mayes	Submission (heel hook)	UFC Fight Night: Cannonier vs. Rodrigues	February 15, 2025	1	1:17	Las Vegas, Nevada, United States	
Win	12–1	Junior Tafa	Submission (heel hook)	UFC 305	August 17, 2024	1	4:56	Perth, Australia	
Loss	11–1	Łukasz Brzeski	Decision (unanimous)	UFC Fight Night: Allen vs. Curtis 2	April 6, 2024	3	5:00	Las Vegas, Nevada, United States	
Win	11–0	Alex Nicholson	TKO (retirement)	Titan FC 82	June 2, 2023	4	0:50	Novi Sad, Serbia	Won the Titan FC Heavyweight Championship.
Win	10–0	Cássio Barbosa de Oliveira	KO (punches)	MMA Series 67	May 3, 2023	2	1:47	Moscow, Russia	Won the MMA Series Heavyweight Championship.
Win	9–0	Ramadan Mohammed Suleiman	TKO (punches)	MMA Series 64	March 18, 2023	1	2:27	Hurghada, Egypt	
Win	8–0	Bunyod Akulov	TKO (punches)	MMA Series 60	December 17, 2022	2	2:52	Moscow, Russia	
Win	7–0	Ruslan Medzhidov	Decision (unanimous)	MMA Series 57	October 2, 2022	3	5:00	Moscow, Russia	
Win	6–0	Andrey Zhukovsky	Decision (unanimous)	MMA Series 54	July 30, 2022	3	5:00	Moscow, Russia	
Win	5–0	Wagner Maia	Decision (split)	Arena Global 16	February 19, 2022	5	5:00	Rio de Janeiro, Brazil	Won the vacant Arena Global Heavyweight Championship.
Win	4–0	Aybek Kobenov	Decision (unanimous)	MMA Series 47	January 29, 2022	3	5:00	Moscow, Russia	Return to Heavyweight.
Win	3–0	Denis Kazakov	TKO (retirement)	GOR MMA	December 5, 2021	1	4:50	Moscow, Russia	Light Heavyweight debut.
Win	2–0	Curtis Saha Touyem	Submission (rear-naked choke)	FFC: Selection 5	December 12, 2020	1	1:06	Moscow, Russia	
Win	1–0	Dmitriy Plyukhov	TKO (punches)	Studsport: St. George Cup 5	October 4, 2020	2	2:46	Moscow, Russia	Heavyweight debut.

== See also ==
- List of current UFC fighters
- List of male mixed martial artists
