= UFC 322 =

Mixed martial arts event in 2025

UFC 322: Della Maddalena vs. Makhachev
- The poster for UFC 322: Della Maddalena vs. Makhachev
- Promotion: Ultimate Fighting Championship
- Date: November 15, 2025
- Venue: Madison Square Garden
- City: New York City, New York, United States
- Attendance: 20,664
- Total gate: $13,624,189

Event chronology
| UFC Fight Night: Bonfim vs. Brown | UFC 322: Della Maddalena vs. Makhachev | UFC Fight Night: Tsarukyan vs. Hooker |

UFC 322: Della Maddalena vs. Makhachev (branded as VeChain UFC 322 for sponsorship reasons) was a mixed martial arts event produced by the Ultimate Fighting Championship that took place on November 15, 2025, at Madison Square Garden in New York City, New York, United States.

== Background ==
The event marked the promotion's 12th visit to New York City and first since UFC 309 in November 2024.

A UFC Welterweight Championship bout between current champion Jack Della Maddalena and former UFC Lightweight Champion Islam Makhachev headlined the event. Makhachev vacated his lightweight title in May in order to move up to welterweight.

In addition, a UFC Women's Flyweight Championship bout between current two-time champion Valentina Shevchenko and former two-time UFC Women's Strawweight Champion Zhang Weili co-headlined the event. Zhang vacated her strawweight title in October in order to challenge for the flyweight title.

A bantamweight bout between Malcolm Wellmaker and Serhiy Sidey was scheduled for this event. However, Sidey withdrew due to a shoulder injury and was replaced by Cody Haddon. Two days before the event, Haddon also withdrew due to an injury and was replaced by promotional newcomer Ethyn Ewing. The bout was subsequently shifted to the featherweight division.

At the weigh-ins, Beneil Dariush weighed in at 157.2 pounds, 1.2 pounds over the lightweight non-title fight limit. The bout proceeded at catchweight and he was fined 25 percent of his purse, which went to his opponent Benoît Saint Denis.

== Results ==
Main card
| Weight class | | | | Method | Round | Time | Notes |
|---|---|---|---|---|---|---|---|
| Welterweight | Islam Makhachev | def. | Jack Della Maddalena (c) | Decision (unanimous) (50–45, 50–45, 50–45) | 5 | 5:00 | (Note: For the UFC Welterweight Championship.) |
| Women's Flyweight | Valentina Shevchenko (c) | def. | Zhang Weili | Decision (unanimous) (50–45, 50–45, 50–45) | 5 | 5:00 | (Note: For the UFC Women's Flyweight Championship.) |
| Welterweight | Michael Morales | def. | Sean Brady | TKO (punches) | 1 | 3:27 |
| Welterweight | Carlos Prates | def. | Leon Edwards | KO (punches) | 2 | 1:28 |
| Catchweight (157.2 lb) | Benoît Saint Denis | def. | Beneil Dariush | KO (punches) | 1 | 0:16 |
Preliminary card (ESPNEWS / ESPN+)
| Middleweight | Bo Nickal | def. | Rodolfo Vieira | KO (head kick) | 3 | 2:24 |
| Middleweight | Gregory Rodrigues | def. | Roman Kopylov | Decision (unanimous) (30–27, 30–27, 29–28) | 3 | 5:00 |
| Women's Flyweight | Erin Blanchfield | def. | Tracy Cortez | Submission (rear-naked choke) | 2 | 4:44 |
| Featherweight | Ethyn Ewing | def. | Malcolm Wellmaker | Decision (unanimous) (30–27, 29–28, 29–28) | 3 | 5:00 |
Early preliminary card (ESPN+ / UFC Fight Pass)
| Middleweight | Kyle Daukaus | def. | Gerald Meerschaert | Submission (brabo choke) | 1 | 0:50 |
| Featherweight | Pat Sabatini | def. | Chepe Mariscal | Decision (unanimous) (30–27, 30–27, 30–27) | 3 | 5:00 |
| Women's Strawweight | Fatima Kline | def. | Angela Hill | Decision (unanimous) (30–27, 30–27, 29–28) | 3 | 5:00 |
| Middleweight | Baisangur Susurkaev | def. | Eric McConico | KO (punch) | 3 | 1:38 |
| Lightweight | Matheus Camilo | def. | Viacheslav Borshchev | Decision (unanimous) (30–27, 30–27, 29–28) | 3 | 5:00 |

== Bonus awards ==
The following fighters received $50,000 bonuses.

- Fight of the Night: No bonus awarded.
- Performance of the Night: Michael Morales, Carlos Prates, Benoît Saint Denis, and Bo Nickal

== See also ==
- 2025 in UFC
- List of current UFC fighters
- List of UFC events
