= UFC 310 =

Mixed martial arts event in 2024

UFC 310: Pantoja vs. Asakura
- The poster for UFC 310: Pantoja vs. Asakura
- Promotion: Ultimate Fighting Championship
- Date: December 7, 2024
- Venue: T-Mobile Arena
- City: Paradise, Nevada, United States
- Attendance: 18,648
- Total gate: $5,011,650

Event chronology
UFC Fight Night: Yan vs. Figueiredo	UFC 310: Pantoja vs. Asakura	UFC on ESPN: Covington vs. Buckley

UFC 310: Pantoja vs. Asakura was a mixed martial arts event produced by the Ultimate Fighting Championship that took place on December 7, 2024, at the T-Mobile Arena in Paradise, Nevada, part of the Las Vegas Valley, United States.

== Background ==
A UFC Welterweight Championship bout between current champion Belal Muhammad and undefeated contender Shavkat Rakhmonov was scheduled to headline the event. However due to a bone infection in his foot, Muhammad was forced to withdraw. Rakhmonov instead faced Ian Machado Garry in a five-round title eliminator co-main event.

A UFC Flyweight Championship bout between current champion Alexandre Pantoja and former two-time Rizin Bantamweight Champion (also promotional newcomer) Kai Asakura was scheduled to be the co-headliner, but it was promoted to main event when the original headliner was cancelled.

A heavyweight rematch between former interim UFC Heavyweight Champion Ciryl Gane and former Bellator Heavyweight World Champion Alexander Volkov was expected to take place at UFC 308, but it was moved to this event due to Volkov's knee injury. The pairing previously headlined UFC Fight Night: Gane vs. Volkov in June 2021 which Gane won by unanimous decision.

A welterweight bout between former WEC and Strikeforce Welterweight Champion Nick Diaz (also former UFC Welterweight Championship challenger) and Vicente Luque was expected to take place at the event. The pair was previously expected to meet at UFC on ABC: Sandhagen vs. Nurmagomedov, but the bout was removed from the event due to travel issues related to Diaz. In turn, Diaz withdrew from the bout due to undisclosed reasons and was replaced by Themba Gorimbo.

A featherweight bout between former UFC Bantamweight Champion Aljamain Sterling and Movsar Evloev took place at this event. They were originally expected to face each other at UFC 307, but Sterling withdrew due to an injury.

A women's strawweight bout between The Ultimate Fighter: Team Joanna vs. Team Cláudia strawweight winner Tatiana Suarez and former Invicta FC Strawweight Champion Virna Jandiroba was scheduled for this event. However, Suarez reportedly withdrew from the fight due to an unspecified health issue and the bout was subsequently removed from the card. They were originally scheduled to compete at UFC on ESPN: Sandhagen vs. Font in August 2023, but Jandiroba had to withdraw due to a knee injury.

Former UFC Middleweight Champion Chris Weidman and former LFA Middleweight Champion Eryk Anders were expected to meet in a middleweight bout at UFC 309, but Anders withdrew on the day of the event because of food poisoning the night before and the bout was scrapped. They met in a catchweight bout of 195 pounds at this event.

A heavyweight bout between Tallison Teixeira and Łukasz Brzeski was scheduled for this event. However, Teixeira withdrew from the fight due to injury and was replaced by Kennedy Nzechukwu.

In addition, Martin Buday and Rizvan Kuniev were scheduled to meet in a heavyweight bout. However, Buday withdrew due to an injury and the bout was removed from the card.

At the weigh-ins, The Return of The Ultimate Fighter: Team Volkanovski vs. Team Ortega middleweight tournament winner Bryan Battle weighed in at 175 pounds, four pounds over the welterweight non-title fight limit. The bout proceeded at catchweight and Battle was fined 30 percent of his purse which went to his opponent Randy Brown.

== Results ==
Main card
Weight class				Method	Round	Time	Notes
Flyweight	Alexandre Pantoja (c)	def.	Kai Asakura	Technical Submission (rear-naked choke)	2	2:05	(Note: For the UFC Flyweight Championship.)
Welterweight	Shavkat Rakhmonov	def.	Ian Machado Garry	Decision (unanimous) (48–47, 48–47, 48–47)	5	5:00	(Note: UFC Welterweight title eliminator.)
Heavyweight	Ciryl Gane	def.	Alexander Volkov	Decision (split) (29–28, 28–29, 29–28)	3	5:00
Featherweight	Bryce Mitchell	def.	Kron Gracie	KO (slam and elbows)	3	0:39
Featherweight	Choi Doo-ho	def.	Nate Landwehr	TKO (elbows)	3	3:21
Preliminary card (ESPN2 / FX / ESPN+ / Disney+)
Light Heavyweight	Dominick Reyes	def.	Anthony Smith	TKO (elbows and punches)	2	4:46
Welterweight	Vicente Luque	def.	Themba Gorimbo	Technical Submission (anaconda choke)	1	0:52
Featherweight	Movsar Evloev	def.	Aljamain Sterling	Decision (unanimous) (29–28, 29–28, 29–28)	3	5:00
Catchweight (175 lb)	Bryan Battle	def.	Randy Brown	Decision (split) (28–29, 29–28, 29–28)	3	5:00
Early preliminary card (ESPN+ / UFC Fight Pass / Disney+)
Catchweight (195 lb)	Eryk Anders	def.	Chris Weidman	TKO (punches)	2	4:51
Flyweight	Joshua Van	def.	Cody Durden	Decision (unanimous) (29–28, 30–26, 30–27)	3	5:00
Welterweight	Michael Chiesa	def.	Max Griffin	Submission (rear-naked choke)	3	1:56
Lightweight	Chase Hooper	def.	Clay Guida	Submission (armbar)	1	3:41
Heavyweight	Kennedy Nzechukwu	def.	Łukasz Brzeski	TKO (punches)	1	4:51

== Bonus awards ==
The following fighters received $50,000 bonuses.

- Fight of the Night: No bonus awarded.
- Performance of the Night: Alexandre Pantoja, Vicente Luque, Chase Hooper, and Kennedy Nzechukwu

== See also ==
- 2024 in UFC
- List of current UFC fighters
- List of UFC events
