= UFC Fight Night: Cejudo vs. Song =

Mixed martial arts event in 2025

- The poster for UFC Fight Night: Cejudo vs. Song
- Promotion: Ultimate Fighting Championship
- Date: February 22, 2025
- Venue: Climate Pledge Arena
- City: Seattle, Washington, United States
- Attendance: 18,287
- Total gate: $3,841,751.94

Event chronology
UFC Fight Night: Cannonier vs. Rodrigues	UFC Fight Night: Cejudo vs. Song	UFC Fight Night: Kape vs. Almabayev

UFC Fight Night: Cejudo vs. Song (also known as UFC Fight Night 252 and UFC on ESPN+ 110) was a mixed martial arts event produced by the Ultimate Fighting Championship that took place on February 22, 2025, at the Climate Pledge Arena in Seattle, Washington, United States.

== Background ==
The event marked the promotion's fourth visit to Seattle and first since UFC on Fox: Johnson vs. Moraga in July 2013.

A bantamweight bout between former UFC Flyweight and Bantamweight Champion (also 2008 Olympic gold medalist in freestyle wrestling) Henry Cejudo and Song Yadong headlined the event.

A women's bantamweight bout between Ketlen Vieira and The Ultimate Fighter: Heavy Hitters women's featherweight winner Macy Chiasson was expected to take place at the event. However, due to an injury suffered by Chiasson, the bout was removed from the card. The pair was previously scheduled for UFC Fight Night: Ankalaev vs. Walker 2 in January 2024, but Vieira was pulled as a result of an injury and the bout was scrapped.

A middleweight bout between Mansur Abdul-Malik and Antonio Trócoli was scheduled for this event. However, Trócoli withdrew for undisclosed reasons and was replaced by Nick Klein.

A welterweight bout between promotional newcomer Islam Dulatov and Adam Fugitt was scheduled for this event. However, Dulatov withdrew from the fight due to an undisclosed injury and was replaced by Billy Goff. In turn, the bout was scrapped during fight week as Fugitt pulled out due to injury.

Middleweight Chidi Njokuani was reportedly linked to this event, but he ended up being scheduled to compete at UFC Fight Night: Vettori vs. Dolidze 2 instead.

A bantamweight bout between former two-time UFC Bantamweight Champion (also former WEC Bantamweight Champion) Dominick Cruz and Rob Font was scheduled for this event. However, Cruz withdrew from the fight due to an injury. He then announced his retirement. Jean Matsumoto, who was scheduled to compete at UFC 313, replaced him in a catchweight bout of 140 pounds.

A heavyweight bout between former interim UFC Heavyweight Championship challenger Curtis Blaydes and promotional newcomer Rizvan Kuniev was scheduled for this event. However, the bout was moved to March 8 at UFC 313 for undisclosed reasons.

A featherweight bout between Edson Barboza and Steve Garcia was scheduled for this event. However, Barboza withdrew from the fight due to an injury and the bout was scrapped.

The Ultimate Fighter: Live lightweight winner Michael Chiesa was linked to this card with an unnamed opponent. However, no opponent was ever announced so he was removed from the card.

== Results ==
Main card (ESPN+)
Weight class				Method	Round	Time	Notes
Bantamweight	Song Yadong	def.	Henry Cejudo	Technical Decision (unanimous) (29–28, 29–28, 30–27)	3	5:00	(Note: An eye injury due to an accidental eye poke rendered Cejudo unable to continue.)
Middleweight	Anthony Hernandez	def.	Brendan Allen	Decision (unanimous) (29–28, 29–28, 29–28)	3	5:00
Catchweight (140 lb)	Rob Font	def.	Jean Matsumoto	Decision (split) (29–28, 28–29, 29–28)	3	5:00
Featherweight	Jean Silva	def.	Melsik Baghdasaryan	TKO (punches and elbows)	1	4:15
Light Heavyweight	Alonzo Menifield	def.	Julius Walker	Decision (split) (29–28, 30–27, 28–29)	3	5:00
Preliminary card (ESPN+)
Light Heavyweight	Ion Cuțelaba	def.	İbo Aslan	Submission (arm-triangle choke)	1	2:51
Featherweight	Melquizael Costa	def.	Andre Fili	Submission (guillotine choke)	1	4:30
Middleweight	Mansur Abdul-Malik	def.	Nick Klein	TKO (punches)	2	3:24
Bantamweight	Ricky Simón	def.	Javid Basharat	KO (punches)	1	3:58
Catchweight (175 lb)	Austin Vanderford	def.	Nikolay Veretennikov	TKO (punches)	2	4:13
Middleweight	Nursulton Ruziboev	def.	Eric McConico	TKO (punches)	2	0:33
Light Heavyweight	Modestas Bukauskas	def.	Raffael Cerqueira	KO (punches)	1	2:12

== Bonus awards ==
The following fighters received $50,000 bonuses.

- Fight of the Night: Alonzo Menifield vs. Julius Walker
- Performance of the Night: Jean Silva and Ricky Simón

== Reported payout ==
The following is the reported payout to the fighters as reported to the Washington State Athletic Commission. The amounts do not include sponsor money, discretionary bonuses, viewership points, or additional earnings.

- Song Yadong: $320,000 (includes $160,000 win bonus) def. Henry Cejudo: $150,000
- Anthony Hernandez: $140,000 (includes $72,000 win bonus) def. Brendan Allen: $210,000
- Rob Font: $320,000 (includes $160,000 win bonus) def. Jean Matsumoto: $26,000
- Jean Silva: $90,000 (includes $45,000 win bonus) def. Melsik Baghdasaryan: $35,000
- Alonzo Menifield: $240,000 (includes $120,000 win bonus) def. Julius Walker: $12,000
- Ion Cuțelaba: $190,000 (includes $95,000 win bonus) def. İbo Aslan: $35,000
- Melquizael Costa: $48,000 (includes $24,000 win bonus) def. Andre Fili: $110,000
- Mansur Abdul-Malik: $24,000 (includes $12,000 win bonus) def. Nick Klein: $10,000
- Ricky Simón: $160,000 (includes $80,000 win bonus) def. Javid Basharat: $30,000
- Austin Vanderford: $30,000 (includes $15,000 win bonus) def. Nikolay Veretennikov: $12,000
- Nursulton Ruziboev: $74,000 (includes $37,000 win bonus) def. Eric McConico: $12,000
- Modestas Bukauskas: $96,000 (includes $48,000 win bonus) def. Raffael Cerqueira: $10,000

== See also ==
- 2025 in UFC
- List of current UFC fighters
- List of UFC events
