= UFC 313 =

Mixed martial arts event in 2025

UFC 313: Pereira vs. Ankalaev
- The poster for UFC 313: Pereira vs. Ankalaev
- Promotion: Ultimate Fighting Championship
- Date: March 8, 2025
- Venue: T-Mobile Arena
- City: Paradise, Nevada, United States
- Attendance: 18,869
- Total gate: $10,100,308

Event chronology
UFC Fight Night: Kape vs. Almabayev	UFC 313: Pereira vs. Ankalaev	UFC Fight Night: Vettori vs. Dolidze 2

UFC 313: Pereira vs. Ankalaev was a mixed martial arts event produced by the Ultimate Fighting Championship that took place on March 8, 2025, at T-Mobile Arena in Paradise, Nevada, part of the Las Vegas Valley, United States.

== Background ==
A UFC Light Heavyweight Championship bout between current champion (also former UFC Middleweight Champion and former Glory Middleweight and Light Heavyweight Champion) Alex Pereira and former title challenger Magomed Ankalaev headlined the event.

A five-round lightweight bout between former interim UFC Lightweight Champion (also former WSOF Lightweight Champion) Justin Gaethje and Dan Hooker was expected to serve as the co-headliner. However, Hooker had to withdraw from the bout due to a hand injury. He was replaced by Rafael Fiziev in what became a three-round bout. They previously met at UFC 286 in March 2023 when Gaethje won by majority decision.

A heavyweight bout between Jhonata Diniz and Vitor Petrino was expected to take place at the event. However, Petrino was forced to withdraw from the fight due to lateral epicondylitis in both elbows, so the bout was removed from the card.

A heavyweight bout between former interim UFC Heavyweight Championship challenger Curtis Blaydes and promotional newcomer Rizvan Kuniev was scheduled for UFC Fight Night: Cejudo vs. Song. However, the bout was moved to this event for unknown reasons. In turn, their bout was cancelled a few hours before the event started as Blaydes suffered from an undisclosed illness.

A bantamweight bout between Chris Gutiérrez and undefeated prospect Jean Matsumoto was scheduled for this event. However, Matsumoto was withdrawn from this event in order to serve as a replacement fighter against Rob Font at UFC Fight Night: Cejudo vs. Song two weeks prior. He was replaced by John Castañeda in a featherweight bout. In turn, the pairing was scrapped hours before taking place as Castañeda suffered an undisclosed illness.

Bruno Gustavo da Silva and Joshua Van were expected to meet in a flyweight bout on the preliminary card. However on February 17, Silva pulled out due to undisclosed reasons and was replaced by Road to UFC Season 2 flyweight winner Rei Tsuruya. This was the first ever UFC bout to feature two fighters born in the 2000s.

During the event's broadcast, former UFC Welterweight Champion Robbie Lawler was announced as the next "modern wing" UFC Hall of Fame inductee during International Fight Week festivities in Las Vegas this June. In 2023, Lawler was inducted to the "fight wing" of the Hall of Fame for his title defense against Rory MacDonald at UFC 189.

== Results ==
Main card
Weight class				Method	Round	Time	Notes
Light Heavyweight	Magomed Ankalaev	def.	Alex Pereira (c)	Decision (unanimous) (49–46, 48–47, 48–47)	5	5:00	(Note: For the UFC Light Heavyweight Championship.)
Lightweight	Justin Gaethje	def.	Rafael Fiziev	Decision (unanimous) (29–28, 29–28, 29–28)	3	5:00
Lightweight	Ignacio Bahamondes	def.	Jalin Turner	Submission (triangle choke)	1	2:29
Women's Strawweight	Amanda Lemos	def.	Iasmin Lucindo	Decision (unanimous) (29–28, 29–28, 29–28)	3	5:00
Lightweight	Maurício Ruffy	def.	King Green	KO (spinning wheel kick)	1	2:07
Preliminary card (ESPNews / ESPN+ / Disney+)
Flyweight	Joshua Van	def.	Rei Tsuruya	Decision (unanimous) (30–27, 30–27, 30–27)	3	5:00
Middleweight	Brunno Ferreira	def.	Armen Petrosyan	Submission (triangle armbar)	2	4:27	(Note: Petrosyan was deducted one point in round 1 due to repeated groin strikes.)
Welterweight	Carlos Leal	def.	Alex Morono	TKO (punches)	1	4:16
Featherweight	Mairon Santos	def.	Francis Marshall	Decision (split) (27–30, 29–28, 29–28)	3	5:00
Early preliminary card (ESPN+ / Disney+ / UFC Fight Pass)
Middleweight	Ozzy Diaz	def.	Djorden Ribeiro dos Santos	Decision (unanimous) (29–28, 29–28, 29–28)	3	5:00

== Bonus awards ==
The following fighters received $50,000 bonuses.

- Fight of the Night: Justin Gaethje vs. Rafael Fiziev
- Performance of the Night: Ignacio Bahamondes and Maurício Ruffy

== See also ==
- 2025 in UFC
- List of current UFC fighters
- List of UFC events
