= Kennedy Nzechukwu =

Nigerian mixed martial artist

- Born: Kennedy Ikenna Nzechukwu; June 13, 1992 (age 34); Imo State, Nigeria
- Other names: American Savage; African Savage
- Height: 6 ft 5 in (1.96 m)
- Weight: 237 lb (108 kg; 16 st 13 lb)
- Division: Light Heavyweight (2017–2024); Heavyweight (2015–2016, 2024–present)
- Reach: 83 in (211 cm)
- Fighting out of: Dallas, Texas, U.S.
- Team: Fortis MMA (2015–2024); War Room MMA (2024–present)
- Years active: 2016–present

Mixed martial arts record
- Total: 22
- Wins: 14
- By knockout: 10
- By submission: 1
- By decision: 3
- Losses: 7
- By knockout: 3
- By submission: 2
- By decision: 2
- Draws: 1

Other information
- Mixed martial arts record from Sherdog

Kennedy Ikenna Nzechukwu (born June 13, 1992) is a Nigerian professional mixed martial artist who competes in the Heavyweight division of the Ultimate Fighting Championship (UFC).

== Background ==
Nzechukwu moved from Nigeria to the United States with his family in 2010. He started training in mixed martial arts when his mother brought him to Fortis MMA in 2015 to learn some discipline. He attended college but dropped out in order to pursue a career in mixed martial arts and after his mother was diagnosed with ALS.

== Mixed martial arts career ==
=== Early career ===
After his amateur career, Nzechukwu turned professional, racking two straight victories in the Xtreme Knockout organization. He was then invited to compete in the Dana White's Contender Series. His bout took place on August 22, 2017, at Dana White's Contender Series 7 against Anton Berzin. He won the bout via split decision but did not receive a contract to the UFC.

He then returned to the regional circuit and notched two knockout victories in XKO and Legacy Fighting Alliance.

=== Dana White's Contender Series ===
Nzechukwu was then invited a second time to Dana White's Contender Series, this time facing Dennis Bryant at Dana White's Contender Series 16 on August 7, 2018. He won the bout via first-round knockout and received a UFC contract.

=== Ultimate Fighting Championship ===
Nzechukwu made his UFC debut against Paul Craig on March 30, 2019, at UFC on ESPN 2. He lost the fight via triangle choke in the third round.

Nzechukwu faced Darko Stošić on August 3, 2019, at UFC on ESPN: Covington vs. Lawler. He won the fight via unanimous decision.

Nzechukwu faced Carlos Ulberg on March 6, 2021, at UFC 259. Ulberg started strong, hurting Nzechukwu badly with strikes and kicks, but quickly became exhausted, resulting in Nzechukwu winning the fight via knockout in round two. This fight earned him the Fight of the Night award.

Nzechukwu faced Danilo Marques, replacing Ed Herman on June 26, 2021, at UFC Fight Night 190. After largely being controlled for most of the bout, he rallied and won the fight via TKO in the third round. This fight earned him the Performance of the Night award.

Nzechukwu was scheduled to face Da Un Jung on October 16, 2021, at UFC Fight Night 195. However, the bout was postponed to UFC Fight Night 197 on November 13, 2021, for unknown reasons. Nzechukwu lost the fight via knockout in round one.

Nzechukwu, as a replacement for Ihor Potieria, faced Nicolae Negumereanu on March 5, 2022, at UFC 272. He lost the fight via split decision. 8 out of 15 media scores gave it to Nzechukwu, while 6 scored it a draw, with only one giving it to Negumereanu.

Nzechukw faced Karl Roberson on July 9, 2022, at UFC on ESPN 39. He won the fight via technical knockout in round three.

Nzechukwu faced Ion Cuțelaba on November 19, 2022, at UFC Fight Night 215. He won the fight via technical knockout in round two. With this win, Nzechukwu earned the Performance of the Night award.

Nzechukwu faced Devin Clark on May 6, 2023, at UFC 288. He won the fight via technical submission in the second round.

Nzechukwu faced Dustin Jacoby on August 5, 2023, at UFC Fight Night 225. He lost the fight via TKO in the first round.

Nzechukwu faced Ovince Saint Preux on March 16, 2024 at, UFC Fight Night 239. He lost the bout by split decision.

==== Return to heavyweight ====
Nzechukwu was scheduled to face Marcos Rogério de Lima in a heavyweight bout on October 26, 2024 at UFC 308. However, de Lima withdrew from the fight for unknown reasons and was replaced by Justin Tafa. Subsequently, Tafa withdrew from the bout due to an injury and was replaced by Chris Barnett. Nzechukwu won the fight by technical knockout in the first round.

Replacing an injured Tallison Teixeira, Nzechukwu faced Łukasz Brzeski on December 7, 2024 at UFC 310. He won the fight by technical knockout via punches at the end of the first round. This fight earned him another Performance of the Night award.

Nzechukwu was scheduled to face Martin Buday on April 5, 2025 at UFC on ESPN 65. However, Nzechukwu was removed from the event due to injury and was replaced by promotional newcomer Uran Satybaldiev.

Nzechukwu faced Valter Walker on July 12, 2025 at UFC on ESPN 70. He lost the fight via a heel hook submission early in the first round.

Nzechukwu faced Marcus Buchecha on December 13, 2025, at UFC on ESPN 73. Despite being deducted one point due to an eye poke, the bout ended via unanimous draw.

Nzechukwu was scheduled to face Vitor Petrino on March 14, 2026 at UFC Fight Night 269. However, Nzechukwu withdrew for undisclosed reasons and was replaced by Steven Asplund.

Nzechukwu faced Shamil Gaziev on August 22, 2026 at UFC Fight Night 285. He lost the fight via knockout in round one.

Nzechukwu is scheduled to face Elisha Ellison on January 16, 2027 at UFC Fight Night 296.

== Championships and accomplishments ==
=== Mixed martial arts ===
- Ultimate Fighting Championship
  - Fight of the Night (One time) vs. Carlos Ulberg
  - Performance of the Night (Three times) vs. Danilo Marques, Ion Cuțelaba and Łukasz Brzeski
  - UFC.com Awards
    - 2021: Ranked #9 Upset of the Year vs. Carlos Ulberg
- MMA Fighting
  - 2024 Third Team MMA All-Star

== Mixed martial arts record ==
Professional record breakdown
| 22 matches | 14 wins | 7 losses |
| By knockout | 10 | 3 |
| By submission | 1 | 2 |
| By decision | 3 | 2 |
| Draws | 1 | |

| Res. | Record | Opponent | Method | Event | Date | Round | Time | Location | Notes |
|---|---|---|---|---|---|---|---|---|---|
| Loss | 14–7–1 | Shamil Gaziev | KO (punch) | UFC Fight Night: Hernandez vs. Rodrigues | August 22, 2026 | 1 | 1:20 | Sacramento, California, United States | |
| Draw | 14–6–1 | Marcus Buchecha | Draw (unanimous) | UFC on ESPN: Royval vs. Kape | December 13, 2025 | 3 | 5:00 | Las Vegas, Nevada, United States | Nzechukwu was deducted one point in round 2 due to an eye poke. |
| Loss | 14–6 | Valter Walker | Submission (inverted heel hook) | UFC on ESPN: Lewis vs. Teixeira | July 12, 2025 | 1 | 0:54 | Nashville, Tennessee, United States | |
| Win | 14–5 | Łukasz Brzeski | TKO (punches) | UFC 310 | December 7, 2024 | 1 | 4:51 | Las Vegas, Nevada, United States | Performance of the Night. |
| Win | 13–5 | Chris Barnett | TKO (knee to the body and punches) | UFC 308 | October 26, 2024 | 1 | 4:27 | Abu Dhabi, United Arab Emirates | Return to Heavyweight. |
| Loss | 12–5 | Ovince Saint Preux | Decision (split) | UFC Fight Night: Tuivasa vs. Tybura | March 16, 2024 | 3 | 5:00 | Las Vegas, Nevada, United States | |
| Loss | 12–4 | Dustin Jacoby | TKO (punches) | UFC on ESPN: Sandhagen vs. Font | August 5, 2023 | 1 | 1:22 | Nashville, Tennessee, United States | |
| Win | 12–3 | Devin Clark | Technical Submission (guillotine choke) | UFC 288 | May 6, 2023 | 2 | 2:28 | Newark, New Jersey, United States | |
| Win | 11–3 | Ion Cuțelaba | TKO (flying knee and punches) | UFC Fight Night: Nzechukwu vs. Cuțelaba | November 19, 2022 | 2 | 1:02 | Las Vegas, Nevada, United States | Performance of the Night. |
| Win | 10–3 | Karl Roberson | TKO (elbows) | UFC on ESPN: dos Anjos vs. Fiziev | July 9, 2022 | 3 | 2:19 | Las Vegas, Nevada, United States | |
| Loss | 9–3 | Nicolae Negumereanu | Decision (split) | UFC 272 | March 5, 2022 | 3 | 5:00 | Las Vegas, Nevada, United States | Nzechukwu was deducted one point in round 3 due to repeated eye pokes. |
| Loss | 9–2 | Jung Da-un | KO (elbows) | UFC Fight Night: Holloway vs. Rodríguez | November 13, 2021 | 1 | 3:04 | Las Vegas, Nevada, United States | |
| Win | 9–1 | Danilo Marques | TKO (punches) | UFC Fight Night: Gane vs. Volkov | June 26, 2021 | 3 | 0:20 | Las Vegas, Nevada, United States | Performance of the Night. |
| Win | 8–1 | Carlos Ulberg | KO (punches) | UFC 259 | March 6, 2021 | 2 | 3:19 | Las Vegas, Nevada, United States | Fight of the Night. |
| Win | 7–1 | Darko Stošić | Decision (unanimous) | UFC on ESPN: Covington vs. Lawler | August 3, 2019 | 3 | 5:00 | Newark, New Jersey, United States | Stošić was deducted two points, one in round 2 and one in round 3, both due to repeated groin strikes. |
| Loss | 6–1 | Paul Craig | Submission (triangle choke) | UFC on ESPN: Barboza vs. Gaethje | March 30, 2019 | 3 | 4:20 | Philadelphia, Pennsylvania, United States | Nzechukwu was deducted one point in round 3 due to repeated eye pokes. |
| Win | 6–0 | Dennis Bryant | TKO (head kick and punches) | Dana White's Contender Series 16 | August 7, 2018 | 1 | 1:48 | Las Vegas, Nevada, United States | |
| Win | 5–0 | Corey Johnson | TKO (punches) | LFA 40 | May 25, 2018 | 2 | 1:18 | Dallas, Texas, United States | |
| Win | 4–0 | Andre Kavanaugh | TKO (punches) | Xtreme Knockout 40 | March 10, 2018 | 1 | 2:40 | Dallas, Texas, United States | Heavyweight bout. |
| Win | 3–0 | Anton Berzin | Decision (split) | Dana White's Contender Series 7 | August 22, 2017 | 3 | 5:00 | Las Vegas, Nevada, United States | |
| Win | 2–0 | Thai Walwyn | Decision (unanimous) | Xtreme Knockout 34 | January 28, 2017 | 3 | 5:00 | Dallas, Texas, United States | Light Heavyweight debut. |
| Win | 1–0 | Matt Foster | TKO (punches) | Xtreme Knockout 33 | November 5, 2016 | 1 | 2:06 | Dallas, Texas, United States | Heavyweight debut. |

== See also ==
- List of current UFC fighters
- List of Dana White's Contender Series alumni
- List of male mixed martial artists
