= 2024 in UFC =

Mixed martial arts events

Information
- First date: January 13, 2024
- Last date: December 14, 2024

Events
- Total events: 42
- UFC: 14
- TUF Finale events: 1

Fights
- Total fights: 517
- Title fights: 19

Chronology
2023 in UFC	2024 in UFC	2025 in UFC

The year 2024 is the 32nd year in the history of the Ultimate Fighting Championship (UFC), a mixed martial arts promotion based in the United States.

== UFC in 2024 ==
=== Class action: anti-trust lawsuits ===
On August 9, 2023, U.S. District Judge Richard Boulware granted class action status to more than 1,200 former UFC fighters who competed between December 2010 and June 2017 and are suing for $800 million upward to $1.6 billion in wages, as the lawsuit claims Zuffa had abused its power to suppress UFC fighters' wages. The anti-trust law also permits private plaintiffs to be able to recover three times the damages suffered, meaning the UFC may ultimately pay several billions of dollars' worth of damages. The case has a scheduled April 8, 2024 trial date. On March 20, 2024, TKO, UFC parent company reached an agreement to settle all claims in the class action lawsuits for $335 million where the settlement amount will be deductible for tax purposes. However, on July 31, 2024, Judge Richard Boulware ruled that the case would be heard by a jury and denied the preliminary approval for a settlement and reset for trial of in October. On October 21, 2024, Judge Richard Boulware of Nevada granted preliminary approval for a $375 million settlement in the "Le vs. Zuffa" antitrust lawsuit for monopolistic practices. As part of the settlement, around $240 million to $260 million will be distributed to eligible fighters, specifically those who competed in at least one UFC bout from December 2010 to June 2017. These payments are expected to be made over the next year. Additionally, $40 million from the settlement will be set aside for administrative and legal expenses. The preliminary approval pertains solely to the "Le vs. Zuffa" case. A second, related antitrust lawsuit, "Johnson vs. Zuffa", which covers fighters who competed in the UFC from 2017 to the present, remains unresolved and continues to proceed separately.

=== Drug Free Sport International partnership ===
UFC announced a new partnership with Drug Free Sport International, begin in January 2024, the same company that oversees the anti-doping programs of the NCAA, MLB, NFL, and NBA. The administration of the UFC Anti-Doping Program, including sanctioning decisions, will be handled exclusively and independently by Combat Sports Anti-Doping (CSAD), where the former FBI agent George Piro would serve as the independent administrator of the UFC's anti-doping program.

=== Vince McMahon resigned over sex trafficking and sexual assault lawsuit ===
On September 12, 2023, Endeavor merged with professional wrestling promotion WWE to form a new publicly traded company under the stock symbol "TKO". TKO executive chairman Vince McMahon resigned on January 26, 2024 after Janel Grant, a former WWE employee, filed a lawsuit against McMahon for sex trafficking and sexual assault.

=== UFC Performance Institute ===
In February 2024, the third Performance Institute was opened in Mexico City, Mexico.

=== Acquired by Silver Lake private equity ===
On April 2, 2024, it was announced by TKO that Endeavor was privately taken 100% by its largest investor, Silver Lake, three years after Endeavor three-year run as a public company where Endeavor purchased the UFC for just over $4 billion in 2016.

=== New glove from June 2024 - November 2024 ===
On April 12, 2024, UFC announced a new glove where changes were made to reduce hand injuries and eye pokes (every 14 fights with an average delay of 50 seconds), while maintaining dexterity and not affecting performance. The new gloves were already tested during the ten weeks of the Dana White's Contender Series 2023 and gloves were used starting in June 2024. New features of the gloves include: (1) a wristband locking system to prevent grabbing of the gloves; (2) all seams are now on the palm side with a lack of seams on top of the hands to minimize abrasions and cuts; (3) removal of finger binding that allows the hand to close maturely to reduce eyes pokes, abrasions, and cuts; (4) padding to the sides of the index and pinky finger of the glove to protect bone; (5) ergonomic curved wristband for better fit around the wrist scooped or angled finger holes to eliminate bunching on the inside of the fisted hand lining; (6) and thicker foam padding for maximum flexibility and protection with an updated law profile hook and loop that minimizes snag and reduces weight; they have an authentication and data chip which allows the UFC to identify a pair of gloves to a fighter in a specific fight.

The gloves come in XXXS to XXXXL sizes with weight lighter by 1 to 1.5 ounces compared to the previous gloves; the new glove weighs between 3 and 4.9 oz. New gloves include five different glove colors: gun-metal gloves will be used for traditional UFC fights; gold gloves with an octagon trim for championship fights and main event bouts; black gloves for “The Ultimate Fighter”; blue gloves for Dana White's Contender Series; and red gloves for Road to the UFC tournaments.

The debut of the new gloves took place at UFC 302 on June 1, 2024, at the Prudential Center in Newark.

On November 12, it was reported that the UFC had notified fighters competing in upcoming events, starting from UFC 309, that the organization will reintroduce its previous glove design, which had been replaced at UFC 302 in June. UFC President Dana White cited frequent complaints from fighters as being the reason for the change, even though the new design had only been in use for six months.

=== New MMA rules ===
Two new Unified Rules of Mixed Martial Arts rules were approved by the Association of Boxing Commissions in July 2024.

(1) Kneeing and/or Kicking the head of a grounded opponent: A fighter shall be considered grounded and may not be legally kneed or kicked to the head when any part of their body other than their hands or feet is in contact with the canvas (ground). (2) Removal of the downward pointing elbow strike (12 to 6) as a foul. The rules were voted in during the Annual ABC Conference in July with a start date of November1, 2024.

UFC Fight Night: Moreno vs. Albazi on November 2, 2024, at Edmonton, Alberta, Canada will be the first event the rules to be implemented.

=== TKO Group Holdings acquire new assets from Endeavor ===
On October 23, 2024, TKO Group Holdings (the combined company with UFC and WWE) acquired the event planning and hospitality service On Location as well as IMG (a sports and media agency, producer and distributor previously housed at Endeavor) from Endeavor in $3.25 billion deal. Under the terms of the deal, Endeavor “will receive approximately 26.14 million common” shares of TKO stock and “will subscribe for an equal number of shares of TKO's Class B common stock.”Once the deal closes, Endeavor will own 59-percent of TKO with remaining shareholders controlling the other 41-percent of TKO stock.

=== Cannabis removed from prohibited list ===
UFC Fight Night: Magny vs. Prates is the first UFC event held in Nevada since cannabis was officially removed from the state's list of banned substances. At the beginning of 2024, the Combat Sports Anti-Doping (CSAD) and Drug Free Sport organizations removed cannabis from their banned substances list when the UFC shifted its anti-doping testing from the United States Anti-Doping Agency (USADA) to CSAD. On October 30, 2024, the Nevada State Athletic Commission also announced its decision to remove cannabis from the state's list of prohibited substances. They stated, “The possession, use, or consumption of cannabis or cannabis products will not be considered an anti-doping violation.”.

== 2024 by the numbers ==
The numbers below records the events, fights, techniques, champions and fighters held or performed for the year of 2024 in UFC.

Events
Number of Events	PPV	Continents	Countries	Cities	Fight Night Bonuses
42	14	5	10	21	174; Total $9.950,000
Longest Event	Shortest Event	Highest Income Live Gate	Lowest Income Live Gate	Highest Attendance	Lowest Attendance
UFC Fight Night: Moreno vs. Albazi 3:06:38	UFC Fight Night: Magny vs. Prates 1:18:26	UFC 306 $21,829,245	UFC on ESPN: Blanchfield vs. Fiorot $2,180,601	UFC Fight Night: Moreno vs. Royval 2 21,246	APEX VIP-only card at the UFC Apex
Title Fights
Undisputed Title Fights	Title Changes	Champions Remained in Their Divisions	Number of Champions	Number of Interim Champions	Number of Title Defenses
19	5	5 FLY - Alexandre Pantoja; LW – Islam Makhachev; LHW – Alex Pereira; HW - Jon Jones; WSW – Zhang Weili	13	1 HW – Tom Aspinall	11
Champions
Division	Beginning of The Year	End of The Year	Division	Beginning of The Year	End of The Year
Heavyweight	Jon Jones	Jon Jones	Bantamweight	Sean O'Malley	Merab Dvalishvili
Light Heavyweight	Alex Pereira	Alex Pereira	Flyweight	Alexandre Pantoja	Alexandre Pantoja
Middleweight	Sean Strickland	Dricus du Plessis	Women's Bantamweight	Raquel Pennington For vacant belt.	Julianna Peña
Welterweight	Leon Edwards	Belal Muhammad	Women's Flyweight	Alexa Grasso	Valentina Shevchenko
Lightweight	Islam Makhachev	Islam Makhachev	Women's Strawweight	Zhang Weili	Zhang Weili
Featherweight	Alexander Volkanovski	Ilia Topuria			
Fights
Most Knockouts at A Single Event	Most submissions at A Single Event	Most Decisions at A Single Event	Total Number of Fights	Total Number of Cage Time	
UFC on ESPN: Blanchfield vs. Fiorot 8	UFC Fight Night: Tuivasa vs. Tybura 6	6 different events 9 decisions each	517	101:32:25	
Fighters
Number of Fighters	UFC Debutants	Releases / Retired	Fighters Suspended	Number of Fighters Missed weight	
(At the end of Dec 31, 2024); 611	103	94	12	39	
Champion feats
Dricus du Plessis became the first South African champion in UFC history.; Ilia Topuria became the first Georgian champion in UFC history.; Max Holloway became the first fighter in UFC history to win an interim, undisputed, and BMF title.; Merab Dvalishvili became the second Georgian champion in UFC history after Topuria.; Alex Pereira set a new record for the shortest time between three UFC title defenses at 175 days.; Kai Asakura became the fourth fighter in modern UFC history to make his promotional debut against a UFC champion.
Fighter feats
Jasmine Jasudavicius broke the UFC women's record with a 300+ total strike differential (326 vs. 26) at UFC 297 in a three-round fight.; Rodolfo Vieira became the first fighter in UFC history to earn four submission victories via arm-triangle choke.; Igor Severino became the first fighter in UFC history to lose a fight via disqualification due to biting.; Kayla Harrison became the first two-time Olympic gold medalist to compete with her UFC 300 debut.; Derrick Lewis became the first in UFC history with 15 knockouts.; Charles Oliveira became the first fighter to earn 20 post-fight bonus awards.; Punahele Soriano landed the most significant ground strikes (136) in a single-fight in UFC history.; Tony Ferguson set the record for most consecutive losses (8) in UFC history.; Sharabutdin Magomedov became the first UFC fighter to win a fight via a double-spinning back fist.; Jim Miller became the first UFC fighter with 27 UFC victories.; Clay Guida set a new record for most losses (19) in UFC history.; Shavkat Rakhmonov and Ian Machado Garry set a combined undefeated record of 33-0 in a single fight in UFC history.

== 2024 UFC Honors awards ==
Starting in 2019, the UFC created year-end awards with "UFC Honors President's Choice Awards" for categories "Performance of the Year" and "Fight of the Year" being chosen by UFC CEO Dana White. The other "UFC Honors Fan Choice Awards" are for categories "Knockout of the Year", "Submission of the Year", "Event of the Year", "Comeback of the Year" and, from 2020, "Debut of the Year" in which fans are able to vote for the winner on social media.

Winners receive a trophy commemorating their achievement along with a set of tires from sponsor Toyo Tires.

2024 UFC Honors Awards
	Performance of the Year	Fight of the Year	Knockout of the Year	Submission of the Year	Debut of the Year	Event of the Year	Comeback of the Year
Winner	Max Holloway defeats Justin Gaethje; UFC 300	Max Holloway defeats Justin Gaethje; UFC 300	Max Holloway defeats Justin Gaethje; UFC 300	Islam Makhachev defeats Dustin Poirier; UFC 302	Carlos Prates defeats Trevin Giles; UFC Fight Night: Hermansson vs. Pyfer	UFC 300: Pereira vs. Hill	Renato Moicano defeats Jalin Turner; UFC 300
Nominee	Ilia Topuria defeats Alexander Volkanovski; UFC 298	Alex Pereira defeats Khalil Rountree Jr. UFC 307	Alex Pereira defeats Jamahal Hill; UFC 300	Dricus du Plessis defeats Israel Adesanya; UFC 305	Kayla Harrison defeats Holly Holm; UFC 300	UFC 299: O'Malley vs. Vera 2	Neil Magny defeats Mike Malott; UFC 297
Nominee	Alex Pereira defeats Jiří Procházka 2 UFC 303	Esteban Ribovics defeats Daniel Zellhuber; UFC 306	Sharabutdin Magomedov defeats Armen Petrosyan; UFC 308	Kayla Harrison defeats Holly Holm; UFC 300	Jean Silva defeats Westin Wilson; UFC Fight Night: Ankalaev vs. Walker 2	UFC 306: O'Malley vs. Dvalishvili	Jack Della Maddalena defeats Gilbert Burns; UFC 299
Nominee	Khamzat Chimaev defeats Robert Whittaker; UFC 308	Dan Hooker defeats Mateusz Gamrot; UFC 305	Vinicius Oliveira defeats Benardo Sopaj; UFC Fight Night: Rozenstruik vs. Gaziev	Paddy Pimblett defeats King Green; UFC 304	Wang Cong defeats Victoria Leonardo; UFC on ESPN: Cannonier vs. Borralho	UFC 308: Topuria vs. Holloway	Gerald Meerschaert defeats Edmen Shahbazyan; UFC on ESPN: Cannonier vs. Borralho
Nominee	Ilia Topuria defeats Max Holloway; UFC 308	Dustin Poirier defeats Benoît Saint Denis; UFC 299	—N/a	—N/a	—N/a	—N/a	—N/a
Ref							

== 2024 UFC.com awards ==
2024 UFC.COM Awards
No	The Fighters	The Submissions	The Newcomers	The Knockouts	The Fights
1	(1) Alex Pereira	Khamzat Chimaev defeats Robert Whittaker; UFC 308	Carlos Prates	Max Holloway defeats Justin Gaethje; UFC 300	Esteban Ribovics defeats Daniel Zellhuber; UFC 306
2	(1) Ilia Topuria	Paddy Pimblett defeats King Green; UFC 304	Kayla Harrison	Ilia Topuria defeats Max Holloway; UFC 308	Alex Pereira defeats Khalil Rountree Jr. UFC 307
3	Carlos Prates	Islam Makhachev defeats Dustin Poirier; UFC 302	Jean Silva	Vinicius Oliveira defeats Benardo Sopaj; UFC Fight Night: Rozenstruik vs. Gaziev	Max Holloway defeats Justin Gaethje; UFC 300
4	Diego Lopes	Dricus du Plessis defeats Israel Adesanya; UFC 305	Mauricio Ruffy	Alex Pereira defeats Jamahal Hill; UFC 300	Islam Makhachev defeats Dustin Poirier; UFC 302
5	Dricus du Plessis	Brian Ortega defeats Yair Rodríguez; UFC Fight Night: Moreno vs. Royval 2	Felipe Lima	Alex Pereira defeats Jiří Procházka 2 UFC 303	Dustin Poirier defeats Benoît Saint Denis; UFC 299
6	Merab Dvalishvili	Anthony Hernandez defeats Roman Kopylov; UFC 298	Zhang Mingyang	Ilia Topuria defeats Alexander Volkanovski; UFC 298	Mateusz Rebecki defeats Myktybek Orolbai; UFC 308
7	Renato Moicano	Alexandre Pantoja defeats Kai Asakura; UFC 310	Oban Elliott	Sharabutdin Magomedov defeats Armen Petrosyan; UFC 308	Brandon Royval defeats Tatsuro Taira; UFC Fight Night: Royval vs. Taira
8	Alexandre Pantoja	Kayla Harrison defeats Holly Holm; UFC 300	Vinicius Oliveira	Shi Ming defeats Feng Xiaocan; UFC Fight Night: Yan vs. Figueiredo	Dan Hooker defeats Mateusz Gamrot; UFC 305
9	Joaquin Buckley	Felipe Lima defeats Muhammad Naimov; UFC on ABC: Whittaker vs. Aliskerov	Lone'er Kavanagh	Carlos Prates defeats Li Jingliang; UFC 305	Zhang Weili defeats Yan Xiaonan; UFC 300
10	Belal Muhammad	Jaqueline Amorim defeats Cory McKenna; UFC Fight Night: Tuivasa vs. Tybura	Michael Page	Esteban Ribovics defeats Terrance McKinney; UFC on ESPN: Lewis vs. Nascimento	Dricus du Plessis defeats Israel Adesanya; UFC 305
Ref					

== Releases and retirements ==
These fighters have either been released from their UFC contracts, announced their retirement, or joined other promotions:

Month	Day	ISO	Fighter	Division	Reason	Ref
January	23	(Canada)	Malcolm Gordon	Flyweight	Retired	
January	24	(United States)	T.J. Brown	Featherweight	Released	
January	26	(Canada)	Yohan Lainesse	Welterweight	Released	
January	31	(Denmark)	Mark Madsen	Lightweight	Retired	
February	5	(Colombia)	Juancamilo Ronderos	Flyweight	Released	
February	5	(United States)	Phil Hawes	Middleweight	Released	
February	6	(Russia)	Albert Duraev	Middleweight	Released	
February	10	(United States)	Felice Herrig	Women's Strawweight	Retired	
February	14	(United States)	Zac Pauga	Light Heavyweight	Released	
February	15	(Russia)	Abubakar Nurmagomedov	Welterweight	Released	
February	15	(United States)	Devin Clark	Light Heavyweight	Released	
February	16	(Switzerland)	Stephanie Egger	Women's Bantamweight	Released	
March	2	(United States)	Jamie Pickett	Middleweight	Retired	
March	2	(United Arab Emirates)	Khusein Askhabov	Featherweight	Released	
March	2	(Australia)	Tyson Pedro	Light Heavyweight	Retired	
March	9	(Scotland)	Joanne Wood	Women's Flyweight	Retired	
March	12	(Brazil)	Daniel Lacerda	Flyweight	Released	
March	12	(Ukraine)	Denys Bondar	Flyweight	Released	
March	12	(United States)	Fernie Garcia	Featherweight	Released	
March	12	(United States)	Luis Saldaña	Featherweight	Released	
March	12	(Brazil)	Mateus Mendonçą	Flyweight	Released	
March	21	(United States)	Bryan Barberena	Middleweight	Released	
March	21	(United States)	Carlos Candelario	Flyweight	Released	
March	21	(United States)	Josh Parisian	Heavyweight	Released	
March	24	(Brazil)	Igor Severino	Flyweight	Released	
March	27	(United States)	A.J. Dobson	Middleweight	Released	
April	10	(Sweden)	Anton Turkalj	Light Heavyweight	Released	
April	10	(United States)	Cynthia Calvillo	Women's Strawweight	Released	
April	16	(Scotland)	Danny Henry	Featherweight	Released	
April	27	(England)	Mike Grundy	Featherweight	Retired	
April	16	(United States)	Valentine Woodburn	Welterweight	Released	
May	4	(United States)	Matt Brown	Welterweight	Retired	
May	10	(Uzbekistan)	Makhmud Muradov	Middleweight	Released	
June	8	(England)	Marc Diakiese	Lightweight	Released	
June	29	(Czech Republic)	David Dvořák	Flyweight	Released	
June	29	(United States)	Michelle Waterson-Gomez	Women's Strawweight	Retired	
June	29	(United States)	Nate Maness	Flyweight	Released	
June	30	(Belarus)	Andrei Arlovski	Heavyweight	Released	
July	28	(England)	Muhammad Mokaev	Flyweight	Released	
July	30	(United States)	Emily Ducote	Women's Strawweight	Released	
July	30	(United States)	Josh Quinlan	Welterweight	Released	
July	30	(Czech Republic)	Lucie Pudilová	Women's Flyweight	Released	
July	30	(United States)	Miguel Baeza	Welterweight	Released	
July	30	(Russia)	Sergey Morozov	Welterweight	Released	
July	31	(Kazakhstan)	Mariya Agapova	Women's Flyweight	Released	
August	13	(Russia)	Denis Tiuliulin	Middleweight	Released	
August	22	(United States)	Casey Kenney	Bantamweight	Released	
August	23	(Peru)	Luis Pajuelo	Featherweight	Released	
August	28	(Sweden)	Pannie Kianzad	Women's Bantamweight	Released	
September	7	(United States)	Matt Schnell	Flyweight	Retired	
September	25	(Lithuania)	Žygimantas Ramaška	Featherweight	Released	
September	27	(United States)	Brendon Marotte	Featherweight	Released	
September	30	(United States)	Alexander Muñoz	Lightweight	Retired	
October	5	(United States)	Carla Esparza	Women's Strawweight	Retired	
October	7	(Brazil)	Kleydson Rodrigues	Flyweight	Released	
October	7	(United States)	Ovince Saint Preux	Light Heavyweight	Released	
October	15	(United States)	Blake Bilder	Featherweight	Released	
October	15	(United States)	Brian Kelleher	Bantamweight	Released	
October	15	(United States)	Brianna Fortino	Women's Strawweight	Released	
October	15	(United States)	Christos Giagos	Lightweight	Released	
October	15	(South Korea)	Da Woon Jung	Light Heavyweight	Released	
October	15	(United States)	Danyelle Wolf	Women's Featherweight	Released	
October	15	(United States)	Victoria Leonardo	Women's Flyweight	Released	
October	15	(Brazil)	Herbert Burns	Featherweight	Released	
October	15	(Syria)	Jarjis Danho	Heavyweight	Released	
October	15	(Netherlands)	Jarno Errens	Featherweight	Released	
October	15	(United States Virgin Islands)	Karl Williams	Heavyweight	Released	
October	15	(Brazil)	Kaynan Kruschewsky	Lightweight	Released	
October	15	(United States)	Ricky Glenn	Welterweight	Released	
October	15	(United States)	Victor Altamirano	Flyweight	Released	
October	15	(France)	Yanis Ghemmouri	Featherweight	Released	
October	15	(United States)	Josh Fremd	Middleweight	Released	
October	16	(Wales)	Cory McKenna	Women's Strawweight	Released	
October	20	(United States)	Daniel Pineda	Featherweight	Retired	
October	22	(England)	Jake Hadley	Bantamweight	Released	
October	29	(Cyprus)	Charalampos Grigoriou	Bantamweight	Released	
October	29	(United States)	Jesse Butler	Bantamweight	Released	
October	29	(United States)	Jessica Penne	Women's Strawweight	Released	
October	29	(Brazil)	Matheus Nicolau	Flyweight	Released	
October	29	(Cuba)	Robelis Despaigne	Heavyweight	Released	
October	29	(Brazil)	Tamires Vidal	Women's Bantamweight	Released	
October	29	(Brazil)	Vinicius Salvador	Bantamweight	Released	
November	5	(Moldova)	Alexander Romanov	Heavyweight	Released	
November	8	(Brazil)	Caio Machado	Light Heavyweight	Released	
November	8	(Brazil)	Rodrigo Nascimento	Heavyweight	Released	
November	17	(United States)	Stipe Miocic	Heavyweight	Retired	
November	21	(United States)	Zach Scroggin	Welterweight	Released	
December	11	(Wales)	Jack Shore	Featherweight	Retired	
December	12	(Sweden)	Alexander Gustafsson	Light Heavyweight	Released	
December	13	(Mexico)	Gabriel Benítez	Lightweight	Released	
December	16	(United States)	Damon Jackson	Featherweight	Retired	
December	21	(Morocco)	Abu Azaitar	Middleweight	Released	
December	21	(United States)	Jared Gooden	Welterweight	Released	
December	30	(Peru)	James Llontop	Lightweight	Released	

== Debut UFC fighters ==
The following fighters fought their first UFC fight in 2024:

Month	Day	ISO	Fighter	Division	Event	Ref
January	13	(Brazil)	Felipe Bunes	Flyweight	UFC Fight Night 234	
January	20	(United States)	Ramon Taveras	Bantamweight	UFC 297	
February	3	(United States)	MarQuel Mederos	Lightweight	UFC Fight Night 235	
February	3	(United States)	Thomas Petersen	Heavyweight	UFC Fight Night 235	
February	7	(Brazil)	Brendson Ribeiro	Light Heavyweight	UFC 298	
February	7	(Ecuador)	Carlos Vera	Bantamweight	UFC 298	
February	7	(United States)	Danny Barlow	Welterweight	UFC 298	
February	7	(Wales)	Oban Elliott	Welterweight	UFC 298	
February	7	(China)	Zhang Mingyang	Light Heavyweight	UFC 298	
February	10	(Belgium)	Bolaji Oki	Lightweight	UFC Fight Night 236	
February	10	(Brazil)	Carlos Prates	Welterweight	UFC Fight Night 236	
February	10	(United States)	Hyder Amil	Featherweight	UFC Fight Night 236	
February	10	(Poland)	Robert Bryczek	Middlweight	UFC Fight Night 236	
February	10	(United States)	Timothy Cuamba	Lightweight	UFC Fight Night 236	
February	24	(Mexico)	Ronaldo Rodríguez	Flyweight	UFC Fight Night 237	
March	2	(United States)	Abdul-Kareem Al-Selwady	Lightweight	UFC Fight Night 238	
March	2	(United States)	AJ Cunningham	Lightweight	UFC Fight Night 238	
March	2	(Kazakhstan)	Bekzat Almakhan	Bantamweight	UFC Fight Night 238	
March	2	(Sweden)	Benardo Sopaj	Bantamweight	UFC Fight Night 238	
March	2	(Brazil)	Vinicius Oliveira	Bantamweight	UFC Fight Night 238	
March	2	(United States)	Mitch Ramirez	Lightweight	UFC Fight Night 238	
March	9	(England)	Michael Page	Welterweight	UFC 299	
March	9	(Cuba)	Robelis Despaigne	Heavyweight	UFC 299	
March	16	(Cyprus)	Charalampos Grigoriou	Bantamweight	UFC Fight Night 239	
March	16	(United States)	Danny Silva	Featherweight	UFC Fight Night 239	
March	23	(Brazil)	André Lima	Flyweight	UFC on ESPN 53	
March	23	(Russia)	Darya Zheleznyakova	Women's Bantamweight	UFC on ESPN 53	
March	23	(Brazil)	Igor Severino	Flyweight	UFC on ESPN 53	
March	23	(Peru)	Luis Pajuelo	Featherweight	UFC on ESPN 53	
March	23	(United States)	Steven Nguyen	Featherweight	UFC on ESPN 53	
March	30	(United States)	Angel Pacheco	Bantamweight	UFC on ESPN 54	
March	30	(United States)	Connor Matthews	Featherweight	UFC on ESPN 54	
March	30	(Turkey)	İbo Aslan	Light Heavyweight	UFC on ESPN 54	
April	6	(Brazil)	César Almeida	Middleweight	UFC Fight Night 240	
April	6	(United States)	Dylan Budka	Middleweight	UFC Fight Night 240	
April	6	(Brazil)	Jean Matsumoto	Bantamweight	UFC Fight Night 240	
April	6	(Brazil)	Pedro Falcão	Bantamweight	UFC Fight Night 240	
April	6	(Brazil)	Valter Walker	Heavyweight	UFC Fight Night 240	
April	6	(Brazil)	Victor Hugo	Bantamweight	UFC Fight Night 240	
April	13	(United States)	Kayla Harrison	Women's Bantamweight	UFC 300	
April	27	(United States)	Chris Padilla	Lightweight	UFC on ESPN 55	
April	27	(Peru)	James Llontop	Lightweight	UFC on ESPN 55	
April	27	(Brazil)	Jhonata Diniz	Heavyweight	UFC on ESPN 55	
May	4	(Brazil)	Dione Barbosa	Women's Flyweight	UFC 301	
May	4	(Lithuania)	Ernesta Kareckaitė	Women's Flyweight	UFC 301	
May	4	(Brazil)	Maurício Ruffy	Lightweight	UFC 301	
May	18	(France)	Oumar Sy	Light Heavyweight	UFC Fight Night 241	
May	18	(England)	Tuco Tokkos	Light Heavyweight	UFC Fight Night 241	
June	1	(United States)	Mitch Raposo	Flyweight	UFC 302	
June	8	(India)	Puja Tomar	Women's Strawweight	UFC on ESPN 57	
June	15	(United States)	Carli Judice	Women's Flyweight	UFC on ESPN 58	
June	15	(Brazil)	Julia Polastri	Women's Strawweight	UFC on ESPN 58	
June	22	(Brazil)	Antonio Trócoli	Middlweight	UFC on ABC 6	
June	22	(Brazil)	Felipe Lima	Featherweight	UFC on ABC 6	
June	22	(South Korea)	Lee Chang-ho	Bantamweight	UFC on ABC 6	
June	22	(Russia)	Magomed Gadzhiyasulov	Light Heavyweight	UFC on ABC 6	
June	22	(China)	Xiao Long	Bantamweight	UFC on ABC 6	
July	7	(Romania)	Alice Ardelean	Women's Strawweight	UFC 304	
July	13	(United States)	Fatima Kline	Women's Flyweight	UFC on ESPN 59	
August	3	(England)	Jordan Vucenic	Lightweight	UFC on ABC 7	
August	10	(United States)	Nikolay Veretennikov	Welterweight	UFC on ESPN 61	
August	10	(Vietnam)	Quang Le	Bantamweight	UFC on ESPN 61	
August	10	(Brazil)	Stephanie Luciano	Women's Strawweight	UFC on ESPN 61	
August	18	(Australia)	Stewart Nicoll	Flyweight	UFC 305	
August	24	(Bolivia)	José Medina	Middleweight	UFC on ESPN 62	
August	24	(Australia)	Kaan Ofli	Featherweight	UFC on ESPN 62	
August	24	(Brazil)	Mairon Santos	Featherweight	UFC on ESPN 62	
August	24	(Switzerland)	Robert Valentin	Middleweight	UFC on ESPN 62	
August	24	(United States)	Ryan Loder	Middleweight	UFC on ESPN 62	
August	24	(China)	Wang Cong	Women's Flyweight	UFC on ESPN 62	
September	7	(England)	Nathan Fletcher	Featherweight	UFC Fight Night 242	
September	7	(China)	Yi Zha	Featherweight	UFC Fight Night 242	
September	7	(Lithuania)	Žygimantas Ramaška	Featherweight	UFC Fight Night 242	
September	28	(Croatia)	Ivan Erslan	Light Heavyweight	UFC Fight Night 243	
October	12	(Australia)	Cody Haddon	Bantamweight	UFC Fight Night 244	
October	12	(Brazil)	Lucas Rocha	Flyweight	UFC Fight Night 244	
October	12	(Uzbekistan)	Ramazan Temirov	Flyweight	UFC Fight Night 244	
October	12	(United States)	Sean Sharaf	Heavyweight	UFC Fight Night 244	
October	19	(United States)	Cameron Smotherman	Bantamweight	UFC Fight Night 245	
October	26	(Brazil)	Carlos Leal Miranda	Welterweight	UFC 308	
November	9	(United States)	Cortavious Romious	Bantamweight	UFC Fight Night 247	
November	9	(Poland)	Klaudia Syguła	Women's Bantamweight	UFC Fight Night 247	
November	9	(United States)	Mansur Abdul-Malik	Middleweight	UFC Fight Night 247	
November	9	(Netherlands)	Reinier de Ridder	Middleweight	UFC Fight Night 247	
November	9	(United States)	Zach Scroggin	Welterweight	UFC Fight Night 247	
November	16	(Mexico)	Roberto Romero	Lightweight	UFC 309	
November	23	(South Korea)	Choi Dong-hun	Flyweight	UFC Fight Night 248	
November	23	(China)	Feng Xiaocan	Women's Strawweight	UFC Fight Night 248	
November	23	(China)	Jieleyisi Baergeng	Bantamweight	UFC Fight Night 248	
November	23	(Peru)	Jose Ochoa	Flyweight	UFC Fight Night 248	
November	23	(England)	Kiru Singh Sahota	Flyweight	UFC Fight Night 248	
November	23	(England)	Lone'er Kavanagh	Flyweight	UFC Fight Night 248	
November	23	(Mongolia)	Nyamjargal Tumendemberel	Flyweight	UFC Fight Night 248	
November	23	(United States)	Ozzy Diaz	Light Heavyweight	UFC Fight Night 248	
November	23	(China)	Shi Ming	Women's Strawweight	UFC Fight Night 248	
November	23	(South Korea)	You Su-young	Bantamweight	UFC Fight Night 248	
December	7	(Japan)	Kai Asakura	Flyweight	UFC 310	
December	14	(New Zealand)	Navajo Stirling	Light Heavyweight	UFC on ESPN 63	

== Suspended fighters ==
The list below is based on fighters suspended either by (1) United States Anti-Doping Agency (USADA) or World Anti-Doping Agency (WADA) for violation of taking prohibited substances or non-analytical incidents, (2) by local commissions on misconduct during the fights or at event venues, or (3) by the UFC for reasons also stated below.

ISO	Name	Nickname	Division	From	Duration	Tested positive for / Info	By	Eligible to fight again	Ref.	Notes
Egypt	Hamdy Abdelwahab	The Hammer	Heavyweight	July 30, 2022	6 months	Exogenous testosterone	CSAD	January 30, 2025		
(United States)	Walt Harris	The Big Ticket	Heavyweight	July 11, 2023	4 years	Drostanolone and its metabolites, exogenous testosterone, and Anastrozole	CSAD	July 11, 2027		Parted with UFC as of March 2025.
(United States)	Miles Johns	Chopo	Bantamweight	September 23, 2023	4 1/2 months	Turinabol	NSAC	February 6, 2024		$2,300 fine $157.04 in prosecution fees.
(Russia)	Khusein Askhabov	Lion'	Featherweight	February 8, 2024.	2 years	Methandienone (aka Dianabol or D-Bol) metabolites	Combat Sports Anti-Doping (CSAD)	February 8, 2026		Parted with UFC as of March 2024.
(United States)	Khalil Rountree Jr.	The War Horse	Light Heavyweight	May 4, 2024	2 months	Exogenous origin of 5a-androstanediol, 5b-androstanediol and androsterone	CSAD	July 4, 2024		
(Republic of Ireland)	Conor McGregor	Notorious	Lightweight	September 20, 2024	18 months	Three anti-doping whereabout failures on June 13, September 19, and September 20, 2024.	CSAD	March 20, 2026		
(Russia)	Irina Alekseeva	Russian Ronda	Women's Bantamweight	October 15, 2023	1 year	Exogenous testosterone	CSAD	October 15, 2024		
(Brazil)	Bruno Silva	Blindado	Middleweight	April 11, 2024	6 months	Drostanolone metabolite	CSAD	October 11, 2024		
(Armenia)	Arman Tsarukyan	Akhalkalakets	Lightweight	April 13, 2024	9 months	Pre-fight altercation with spectator during UFC 300	NSAC	January 12, 2025		$25,000 fine; additionally, if he issues an anti-bullying public service announcement approved by NSAC, sentence can be reduced to six months with fight eligibility on October 12, 2024
(Peru)	Luis Pajuelo	Corazón de León	Featherweight	August 13, 2024	2 years	tested positive for 19-norandrosterone and elevated levels of exogenous testosterone	NSAC	August 13, 2026		Parted with UFC as of August 2024.
(Russia)	Azamat Murzakanov	The Professional	Light Heavyweight	November 1, 2024	6 months	LGD-4033 metabolites	CSAD	May 1, 2025		Second violation under UFC.

== The Ultimate Fighter ==
The following The Ultimate Fighter seasons are scheduled for broadcast in 2024:

Season	Division	Winner	Runner-up	Ref
The Ultimate Fighter 32	Featherweight	Mairon Santos	Kaan Ofli	
The Ultimate Fighter 32	Middleweight	Ryan Loder	Robert Valentin	

== Title fights ==
Title fights in 2024
Weight class				Method	Round	Time	Event	Notes
Women's Bantamweight	Raquel Pennington	def.	Mayra Bueno Silva	Decision (unanimous) (49–46, 49–46, 49–45)	5	5:00	UFC 297	(Note: For the vacant UFC Women's Bantamweight Championship.)
Middleweight	Dricus du Plessis	def.	Sean Strickland (c)	Decision (split) (47–48, 48–47, 48–47)	5	5:00	UFC 297	(Note: For the UFC Middleweight Championship.)
Featherweight	Ilia Topuria	def.	Alexander Volkanovski (c)	KO (punch)	2	3:32	UFC 298	(Note: For the UFC Featherweight Championship.)
Bantamweight	Sean O'Malley (c)	def.	Marlon Vera	Decision (unanimous) (50–45, 50–45, 50–44)	5	5:00	UFC 299	(Note: For the UFC Bantamweight Championship.)
Women's Strawweight	Zhang Weili (c)	def.	Yan Xiaonan	Decision (unanimous) (49–45, 49–45, 49–45)	5	5:00	UFC 300	(Note: For the UFC Women's Strawweight Championship.)
Light Heavyweight	Alex Pereira (c)	def.	Jamahal Hill	KO (punches)	1	3:14	UFC 300	(Note: For the UFC Light Heavyweight Championship.)
Flyweight	Alexandre Pantoja (c)	def.	Steve Erceg	Decision (unanimous) (48–47, 48–47, 49–46)	5	5:00	UFC 301	(Note: For the UFC Flyweight Championship.)
Lightweight	Islam Makhachev (c)	def.	Dustin Poirier	Submission (brabo choke)	5	2:42	UFC 302	(Note: For the UFC Lightweight Championship.)
Light Heavyweight	Alex Pereira (c)	def.	Jiří Procházka	TKO (head kick and punches)	2	0:13	UFC 303	(Note: For the UFC Light Heavyweight Championship.)
Heavyweight	Tom Aspinall (ic)	def.	Curtis Blaydes	TKO (punches)	1	1:00	UFC 304	(Note: For the interim UFC Heavyweight Championship.)
Welterweight	Belal Muhammad	def.	Leon Edwards (c)	Decision (unanimous) (48–47, 48–47, 49–46)	5	5:00	UFC 304	(Note: For the UFC Welterweight Championship.)
Middleweight	Dricus du Plessis (c)	def.	Israel Adesanya	Submission (face crank)	4	3:38	UFC 305	(Note: For the UFC Middleweight Championship.)
Women's Flyweight	Valentina Shevchenko	def.	Alexa Grasso (c)	Decision (unanimous) (50–45, 50–45, 50–45)	5	5:00	UFC 306	(Note: For the UFC Women's Flyweight Championship.)
Bantamweight	Merab Dvalishvili	def.	Sean O'Malley (c)	Decision (unanimous) (49–46, 48–47, 48–47)	5	5:00	UFC 306	(Note: For the UFC Bantamweight Championship.)
Women's Bantamweight	Julianna Peña	def.	Raquel Pennington (c)	Decision (split) (48–47, 47–48, 48–47)	5	5:00	UFC 307	(Note: For the UFC Women's Bantamweight Championship.)
Light Heavyweight	Alex Pereira (c)	def.	Khalil Rountree Jr.	TKO (punches)	4	4:32	UFC 307	(Note: For the UFC Light Heavyweight Championship.)
Featherweight	Ilia Topuria (c)	def.	Max Holloway	KO (punches)	3	1:34	UFC 308	(Note: For the UFC Featherweight Championship.)
Heavyweight	Jon Jones (c)	def.	Stipe Miocic	TKO (spinning back kick and punches)	3	4:29	UFC 309	(Note: For the UFC Heavyweight Championship.)
Flyweight	Alexandre Pantoja (c)	def.	Kai Asakura	Technical Submission (rear-naked choke)	2	2:05	UFC 310	(Note: For the UFC Flyweight Championship.)

== Events list ==
=== Past events ===
#	Event	Date	Venue	City	Country	Atten.	Ref.	Fight of the Night			Performance of the Night		Bonus	Ref.
716	UFC on ESPN: Covington vs. Buckley	Dec 14, 2024	Amalie Arena	Tampa, Florida	United States	18,625		Cub Swanson	vs.	Billy Quarantillo	Michael Johnson	Dustin Jacoby	$50,000	
715	UFC 310: Pantoja vs. Asakura	Dec 7, 2024	T-Mobile Arena	Paradise, Nevada	United States	18,648		—N/a			Alexandre Pantoja	Vicente Luque	$50,000	
715	UFC 310: Pantoja vs. Asakura	Dec 7, 2024	T-Mobile Arena	Paradise, Nevada	United States	18,648		—N/a			Chase Hooper	Kennedy Nzechukwu	$50,000	
714	UFC Fight Night: Yan vs. Figueiredo	Nov 23, 2024	Galaxy Arena	Macau, SAR	China	12,615		—N/a			Muslim Salikhov	Gabriella Fernandes	$50,000	
714	UFC Fight Night: Yan vs. Figueiredo	Nov 23, 2024	Galaxy Arena	Macau, SAR	China	12,615		—N/a			Zhang Mingyang	Shi Ming	$50,000	
713	UFC 309: Jones vs. Miocic	Nov 16, 2024	Madison Square Garden	New York City	United States	20,200		Charles Oliveira	vs.	Michael Chandler	Jon Jones	Ramiz Brahimaj	$50,000	
713	UFC 309: Jones vs. Miocic	Nov 16, 2024	Madison Square Garden	New York City	United States	20,200		Charles Oliveira	vs.	Michael Chandler	Oban Elliott	—N/a	$50,000	
712	UFC Fight Night: Magny vs. Prates	Nov 9, 2024	UFC Apex	Las Vegas, Nevada	United States	—N/a		—N/a			Carlos Prates	Mansur Abdul-Malik	$50,000	
712	UFC Fight Night: Magny vs. Prates	Nov 9, 2024	UFC Apex	Las Vegas, Nevada	United States	—N/a		—N/a			Charles Radtke	Da'Mon Blackshear	$50,000	
711	UFC Fight Night: Moreno vs. Albazi	Nov 2, 2024	Rogers Place	Edmonton, Alberta	Canada	16,439		—N/a			Jasmine Jasudavicius	Dustin Stoltzfus	$50,000	
711	UFC Fight Night: Moreno vs. Albazi	Nov 2, 2024	Rogers Place	Edmonton, Alberta	Canada	16,439		—N/a			Charles Jourdain	Youssef Zalal	$50,000	
710	UFC 308: Topuria vs. Holloway	Oct 26, 2024	Etihad Arena	Abu Dhabi	United Arab Emirates	—N/a		Mateusz Rębecki	vs.	Myktybek Orolbai	Ilia Topuria	Khamzat Chimaev	$50,000	
710	UFC 308: Topuria vs. Holloway	Oct 26, 2024	Etihad Arena	Abu Dhabi	United Arab Emirates	—N/a		Mateusz Rębecki	vs.	Myktybek Orolbai	Sharabutdin Magomedov	—N/a	$50,000	
709	UFC Fight Night: Hernandez vs. Pereira	Oct 19, 2024	UFC Apex	Las Vegas, Nevada	United States	—N/a		Darren Elkins	vs.	Daniel Pineda	Anthony Hernandez	—N/a	$50,000	
708	UFC Fight Night: Royval vs. Taira	Oct 12, 2024	UFC Apex	Las Vegas, Nevada	United States	—N/a		Brandon Royval	vs.	Tatsuro Taira	Ramazan Temirov	Clayton Carpenter	$50,000	
707	UFC 307: Pereira vs. Rountree Jr.	Oct 5, 2024	Delta Center	Salt Lake City, Utah	United States	17,487		Alex Pereira	vs.	Khalil Rountree Jr.	Joaquin Buckley	Ryan Spann	$50,000	
706	UFC Fight Night: Moicano vs. Saint Denis	Sep 28, 2024	Accor Arena	Paris	France	15,449		—N/a			Bryan Battle	Morgan Charrière	$50,000	
706	UFC Fight Night: Moicano vs. Saint Denis	Sep 28, 2024	Accor Arena	Paris	France	15,449		—N/a			Farès Ziam	Chris Duncan	$50,000	
705	UFC 306: O'Malley vs. Dvalishvili	Sep 14, 2024	Sphere	Las Vegas, Nevada	United States	16,024		Daniel Zellhuber	vs.	Esteban Ribovics	Ignacio Bahamondes	Ketlen Souza	$50,000	
704	UFC Fight Night: Burns vs. Brady	Sep 7, 2024	UFC Apex	Las Vegas, Nevada	United States	—N/a		Jéssica Andrade	vs.	Natália Silva	Steve Garcia	Cody Durden	$50,000	
703	UFC on ESPN: Cannonier vs. Borralho	Aug 24, 2024	UFC Apex	Las Vegas, Nevada	United States	—N/a		Jared Cannonier	vs.	Caio Borralho	Michael Morales	Gerald Meerschaert	$50,000	
703	UFC on ESPN: Cannonier vs. Borralho	Aug 24, 2024	UFC Apex	Las Vegas, Nevada	United States	—N/a		Jared Cannonier	vs.	Caio Borralho	Wang Cong	—N/a	$50,000	
702	UFC 305: du Plessis vs. Adesanya	Aug 18, 2024	RAC Arena	Perth	Australia	14,152		Mateusz Gamrot	vs.	Dan Hooker	Kai Kara-France	Carlos Prates	$50,000	
701	UFC on ESPN: Tybura vs. Spivac 2	Aug 10, 2024	UFC Apex	Las Vegas, Nevada	United States	—N/a		—N/a			Serghei Spivac	Toshiomi Kazama	$50,000	
701	UFC on ESPN: Tybura vs. Spivac 2	Aug 10, 2024	UFC Apex	Las Vegas, Nevada	United States	—N/a		—N/a			Youssef Zalal	—N/a	$50,000	
700	UFC on ABC: Sandhagen vs. Nurmagomedov	Aug 3, 2024	Etihad Arena	Abu Dhabi	United Arab Emirates	—N/a		Sharabutdin Magomedov	vs.	Michał Oleksiejczuk	Joel Álvarez	Azamat Murzakanov	$50,000	
699	UFC 304: Edwards vs. Muhammad 2	Jul 27, 2024	Co-op Live	Manchester	England	17,907		—N/a			Paddy Pimblett		$200,000	
699	UFC 304: Edwards vs. Muhammad 2	Jul 27, 2024	Co-op Live	Manchester	England	17,907		—N/a			Tom Aspinall	Mick Parkin	$100,000	
698	UFC on ESPN: Lemos vs. Jandiroba	Jul 20, 2024	UFC Apex	Las Vegas, Nevada	United States	—N/a		—N/a			Virna Jandiroba	Steve Garcia	$50,000	
698	UFC on ESPN: Lemos vs. Jandiroba	Jul 20, 2024	UFC Apex	Las Vegas, Nevada	United States	—N/a		—N/a			Bruno Gustavo da Silva	Hyder Amil	$50,000	
697	UFC on ESPN: Namajunas vs. Cortez	Jul 13, 2024	Ball Arena	Denver, Colorado	United States	16,884		Drew Dober	vs.	Jean Silva	Charles Johnson	Montel Jackson	$50,000	
696	UFC 303: Pereira vs. Procházka 2	Jun 29, 2024	T-Mobile Arena	Paradise, Nevada	United States	18,881		Cub Swanson	vs.	Andre Fili	Alex Pereira	Macy Chiasson	$50,000	
696	UFC 303: Pereira vs. Procházka 2	Jun 29, 2024	T-Mobile Arena	Paradise, Nevada	United States	18,881		Cub Swanson	vs.	Andre Fili	Joe Pyfer	Payton Talbott	$50,000	
695	UFC on ABC: Whittaker vs. Aliskerov	Jun 22, 2024	Kingdom Arena	Riyadh	Saudi Arabia	—N/a		—N/a			Robert Whittaker	Volkan Oezdemir	$50,000	
695	UFC on ABC: Whittaker vs. Aliskerov	Jun 22, 2024	Kingdom Arena	Riyadh	Saudi Arabia	—N/a		—N/a			Sharabutdin Magomedov	Felipe Lima	$50,000	
694	UFC on ESPN: Perez vs. Taira	Jun 15, 2024	UFC Apex	Las Vegas, Nevada	United States	—N/a		Gabriella Fernandes	vs.	Carli Judice	Tatsuro Taira	Brady Hiestand	$50,000	
693	UFC on ESPN: Cannonier vs. Imavov	Jun 8, 2024	KFC Yum! Center	Louisville, Kentucky	United States	19,578		—N/a			Raul Rosas Jr.	Brunno Ferreira	$50,000	
693	UFC on ESPN: Cannonier vs. Imavov	Jun 8, 2024	KFC Yum! Center	Louisville, Kentucky	United States	19,578		—N/a			Zachary Reese	Carlos Prates	$50,000	
692	UFC 302: Makhachev vs. Poirier	Jun 1, 2024	Prudential Center	Newark, New Jersey	United States	17,834		Islam Makhachev	vs.	Dustin Poirier	Islam Makhachev	Kevin Holland	$50,000	
691	UFC Fight Night: Barboza vs. Murphy	May 18, 2024	UFC Apex	Las Vegas, Nevada	United States	—N/a		Edson Barboza	vs.	Lerone Murphy	Khaos Williams	Angela Hill	$50,000	
690	UFC on ESPN: Lewis vs. Nascimento	May 11, 2024	Enterprise Center	St. Louis, Missouri	United States	15,960		Billy Goff	vs.	Trey Waters	Carlos Ulberg	Carlos Diego Ferreira	$50,000	
689	UFC 301: Pantoja vs. Erceg	May 4, 2024	Farmasi Arena	Rio de Janeiro	Brazil	14,514		—N/a			Michel Pereira	Caio Borralho	$50,000	
689	UFC 301: Pantoja vs. Erceg	May 4, 2024	Farmasi Arena	Rio de Janeiro	Brazil	14,514		—N/a			Maurício Ruffy	Alessandro Costa	$50,000	
688	UFC on ESPN: Nicolau vs. Perez	Apr 27, 2024	UFC Apex	Las Vegas, Nevada	United States	—N/a		—N/a			Alex Perez	Bogdan Guskov	$50,000	
688	UFC on ESPN: Nicolau vs. Perez	Apr 27, 2024	UFC Apex	Las Vegas, Nevada	United States	—N/a		—N/a			Jhonata Diniz	Uroš Medić	$50,000	
687	UFC 300: Pereira vs. Hill	Apr 13, 2024	T-Mobile Arena	Las Vegas, Nevada	United States	20,867		Justin Gaethje	vs.	Max Holloway	Max Holloway	Jiří Procházka	$300,000	
686	UFC Fight Night: Allen vs. Curtis 2	Apr 6, 2024	UFC Apex	Las Vegas, Nevada	United States	—N/a		Morgan Charrière	vs.	Jose Mariscal	Ignacio Bahamondes	César Almeida	$50,000	
685	UFC on ESPN: Blanchfield vs. Fiorot	Mar 30, 2024	Boardwalk Hall	Atlantic City, New Jersey	United States	12,198		İbo Aslan	vs.	Anton Turkalj	Nate Landwehr	Dennis Buzukja	$50,000	
684	UFC on ESPN: Ribas vs. Namajunas	Mar 23, 2024	UFC Apex	Las Vegas, Nevada	United States	—N/a		Jarno Errens	vs.	Steven Nguyen	Payton Talbott	Fernando Padilla	$50,000^{1}	
684	UFC on ESPN: Ribas vs. Namajunas	Mar 23, 2024	UFC Apex	Las Vegas, Nevada	United States	—N/a		Jarno Errens	vs.	Steven Nguyen	André Lima (Bite of the Night)	—N/a	$50,000^{1}	
683	UFC Fight Night: Tuivasa vs. Tybura	Mar 16, 2024	UFC Apex	Las Vegas, Nevada	United States	—N/a		—N/a			Marcin Tybura	Macy Chiasson	$50,000	
683	UFC Fight Night: Tuivasa vs. Tybura	Mar 16, 2024	UFC Apex	Las Vegas, Nevada	United States	—N/a		—N/a			Jafel Filho	Jaqueline Amorim	$50,000	
682	UFC 299: O'Malley vs. Vera 2	Mar 9, 2024	Kaseya Center	Miami, Florida	United States	19,165		Dustin Poirier	vs.	Benoît Saint Denis	Sean O'Malley	Jack Della Maddalena	$50,000	
682	UFC 299: O'Malley vs. Vera 2	Mar 9, 2024	Kaseya Center	Miami, Florida	United States	19,165		Dustin Poirier	vs.	Benoît Saint Denis	Curtis Blaydes	Michel Pereira	$50,000	
682	UFC 299: O'Malley vs. Vera 2	Mar 9, 2024	Kaseya Center	Miami, Florida	United States	19,165		Dustin Poirier	vs.	Benoît Saint Denis	Robelis Despaigne	—N/a	$50,000	
681	UFC Fight Night: Rozenstruik vs. Gaziev	Mar 2, 2024	UFC Apex	Las Vegas, Nevada	United States	—N/a		Vinicius Oliveira	vs.	Bernardo Sopaj	Steve Erceg	Vinicius Oliveira	$50,000	
680	UFC Fight Night: Moreno vs. Royval 2	Feb 24, 2024	Arena CDMX	Mexico City	Mexico	21,546		Daniel Zellhuber	vs.	Francisco Prado	Brian Ortega	Manuel Torres	$50,000	
679	UFC 298: Volkanovski vs. Topuria	Feb 17, 2024	Honda Center	Anaheim, California	United States	18,186		Amanda Lemos	vs.	Mackenzie Dern	Ilia Topuria	Anthony Hernandez	$50,000	
679	UFC 298: Volkanovski vs. Topuria	Feb 17, 2024	Honda Center	Anaheim, California	United States	18,186		Amanda Lemos	vs.	Mackenzie Dern	Zhang Mingyang	—N/a	$50,000	
678	UFC Fight Night: Hermansson vs. Pyfer	Feb 10, 2024	UFC Apex	Las Vegas, Nevada	United States	—N/a		—N/a			Dan Ige	Rodolfo Vieira	$50,000	
678	UFC Fight Night: Hermansson vs. Pyfer	Feb 10, 2024	UFC Apex	Las Vegas, Nevada	United States	—N/a		—N/a			Carlos Prates	Bogdan Guskov	$50,000	
677	UFC Fight Night: Dolidze vs. Imavov	Feb 3, 2024	UFC Apex	Las Vegas, Nevada	United States	—N/a		Azat Maksum	vs.	Charles Johnson	Randy Brown	Molly McCann	$50,000	
676	UFC 297: Strickland vs. du Plessis	Jan 20, 2024	Scotiabank Arena	Toronto, Ontario	Canada	18,559		Sean Strickland	vs.	Dricus du Plessis	Gillian Robertson	Jasmine Jasudavicius	$50,000	
675	UFC Fight Night: Ankalaev vs. Walker 2	Jan 13, 2024	UFC Apex	Las Vegas, Nevada	United States	—N/a		—N/a			Magomed Ankalaev	Jim Miller	$50,000	
675	UFC Fight Night: Ankalaev vs. Walker 2	Jan 13, 2024	UFC Apex	Las Vegas, Nevada	United States	—N/a		—N/a			Brunno Ferreira	Marcus McGhee	$50,000	

1. André Lima was awarded an honorary "Bite of the Night" bonus after Igor Severino was disqualified for biting him.

== See also ==
- List of UFC champions
- List of UFC events
- List of current UFC fighters
- 2024 in Professional Fighters League
- 2024 in Bellator MMA
- 2024 in ONE Championship
- 2024 in Absolute Championship Akhmat
- 2024 in Konfrontacja Sztuk Walki
- 2024 in Rizin Fighting Federation
- 2024 in LUX Fight League
- 2024 in Oktagon MMA
- 2024 in Brave Combat Federation
- 2024 in UAE Warriors
- 2024 in Legacy Fighting Alliance
