= UFC 300 =

2024 mixed martial arts event

UFC 300: Pereira vs. Hill
- The poster for UFC 300: Pereira vs. Hill
- Promotion: Ultimate Fighting Championship
- Date: April 13, 2024
- Venue: T-Mobile Arena
- City: Paradise, Nevada, United States
- Attendance: 20,067
- Total gate: $16,508,823
- Buyrate: 615,000

Event chronology
UFC Fight Night: Allen vs. Curtis 2	UFC 300: Pereira vs. Hill	UFC on ESPN: Nicolau vs. Perez

UFC 300: Pereira vs. Hill was a mixed martial arts event produced by the Ultimate Fighting Championship that took place on April 13, 2024, at the T-Mobile Arena in Paradise, Nevada, part of the Las Vegas Valley, United States.

== Background ==
=== Main card: three title fights and a title eliminator ===
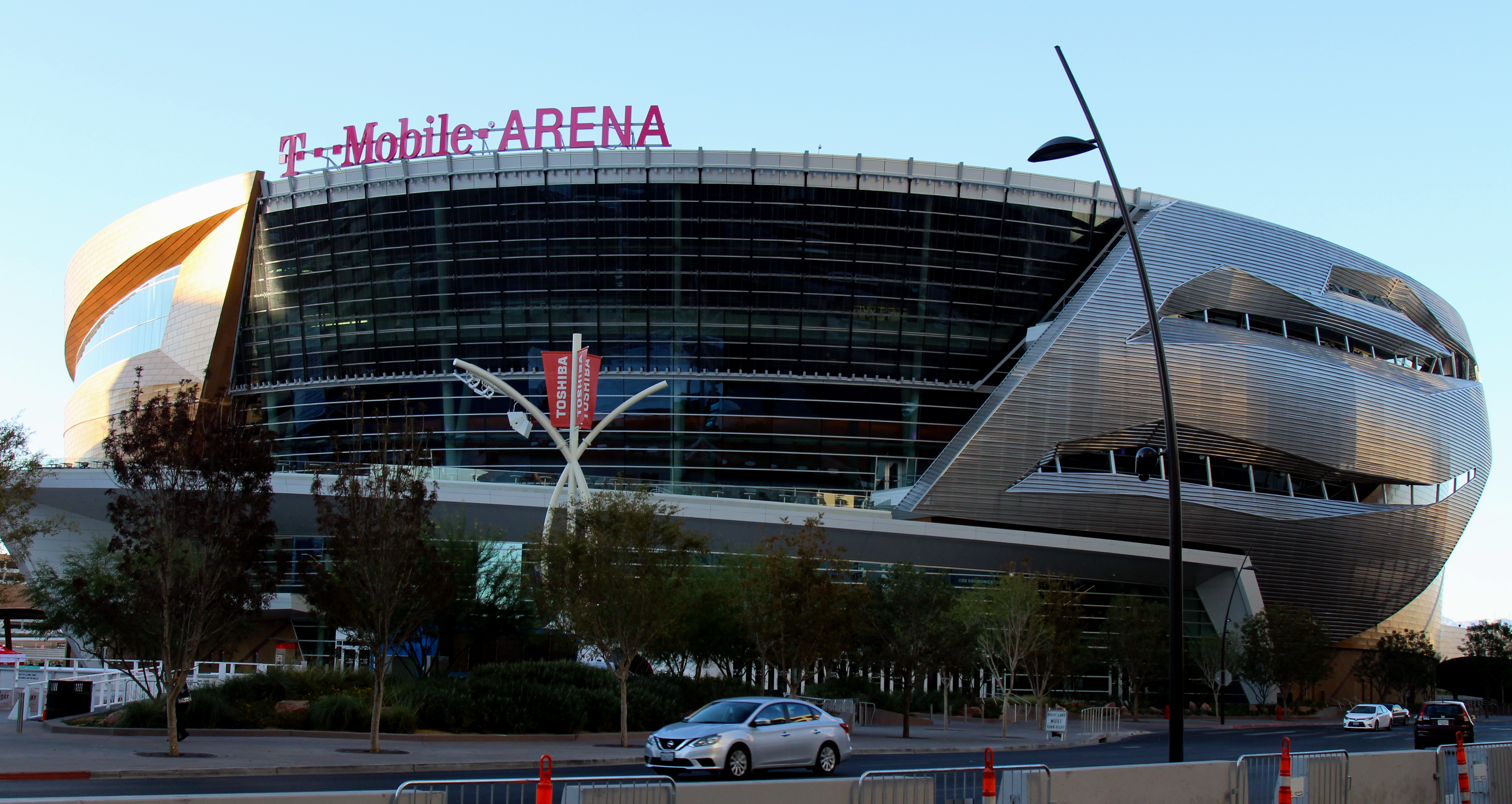
After hosting UFC 200 in 2016, T-Mobile Arena hosted another milestone event, which was its 28th UFC event overall.

A UFC Light Heavyweight Championship bout between current champion Alex Pereira (also former UFC Middleweight Champion and former Glory Middleweight and Light Heavyweight Champion) and former champion Jamahal Hill headlined the event. The fight was verbally agreed for UFC 301 three weeks later, but the promotion opted to book it at this card. Pereira won the vacant title at UFC 295 against former champion Jiří Procházka after Hill was forced to vacate it in July 2023 due to a ruptured Achilles tendon.

A UFC Women's Strawweight Championship bout between current two-time champion Zhang Weili and Yan Xiaonan took place in the co-main event. It marked the first time two Chinese-born athletes met for a title in the organization.

Former interim UFC Lightweight Champion Justin Gaethje (also former WSOF Lightweight Champion) put his symbolic "BMF" (baddest motherfucker) title on the line against former UFC Featherweight Champion Max Holloway in a lightweight bout. Gaethje won the symbolic title at UFC 291 defeating fellow former interim champion Dustin Poirier by second-round knockout in what was their second meeting. The inaugural UFC Heavyweight Champion and UFC Hall of Famer Mark Coleman (also PRIDE 2000 Open Weight Grand Prix champion) delivered the belt to the winner.

Former UFC Lightweight Champion Charles Oliveira and Arman Tsarukyan met in a lightweight title eliminator bout.

The main card was opened by a middleweight bout between three-time NCAA Division I National Wrestling Champion and undefeated prospect Bo Nickal and Cody Brundage.

=== Under-card ===
Former UFC Light Heavyweight Champion Jiří Procházka (also the inaugural Rizin Light Heavyweight Champion) and Aleksandar Rakić met in a light heavyweight contest as the featured bout of the preliminary card.

Former UFC Bantamweight Champion Aljamain Sterling made his promotional debut at featherweight against Calvin Kattar.

2012 and 2016 Olympic gold medalist in judo (also two-time PFL women's lightweight tournament champion) Kayla Harrison made her promotional debut, as well as her bantamweight debut, against former UFC Women's Bantamweight Champion (also International Boxing Hall of Famer) Holly Holm.

A featherweight bout between Sodiq Yusuff and Diego Lopes took place at the event.

Renato Moicano and Jalin Turner met in a lightweight bout, which was the final addition to the card.

Former UFC Women's Strawweight Champion Jéssica Andrade and Marina Rodriguez met in a women's strawweight bout.

Jim Miller and Bobby Green met in a lightweight bout at the event. Miller became the only fighter to have competed at all three milestone events for the organization, previously competing at UFC 100 and UFC 200. The duo was previously booked thrice, but canceled all three times due to Green withdrawals: first at UFC 172 in April 2014, due to an elbow injury; the second booking at UFC 258 in February 2021, when he collapsed after the weigh-ins and was deemed unfit to compete; and the third time at UFC 276 in July 2022, when Green withdrew for unknown reasons.

A bantamweight bout between former UFC Bantamweight Champion Cody Garbrandt and former two-time UFC Flyweight Champion Deiveson Figueiredo was chosen to open the event. The pairing was previously scheduled to meet at UFC 255 in November 2020 for the flyweight title but Garbrandt withdrew due to a torn bicep.

=== Additional information ===
The event originally featured $50,000 fight night bonuses, which were raised to $300,000 2 days before the event, marking the highest amount ever paid by the promotion for such bonuses.

During the event's broadcast, it was announced that a UFC Middleweight Championship bout that took place in August 2010 at UFC 117 between then-champion Anderson Silva (also a UFC Hall of Famer himself) and challenger Chael Sonnen (also a former UFC Light Heavyweight Championship challenger) was the next "fight wing" UFC Hall of Fame inductee. Anderson defended the title via fifth-round submission in what was considered one of the greatest comebacks in MMA history.

== Results ==
Main card
Weight class				Method	Round	Time	Notes
Light Heavyweight	Alex Pereira (c)	def.	Jamahal Hill	KO (punches)	1	3:14	(Note: For the UFC Light Heavyweight Championship.)
Women's Strawweight	Zhang Weili (c)	def.	Yan Xiaonan	Decision (unanimous) (49–45, 49–45, 49–45)	5	5:00	(Note: For the UFC Women's Strawweight Championship.)
Lightweight	Max Holloway	def.	Justin Gaethje (c)	KO (punch)	5	4:59	(Note: For the symbolic "BMF" title. Tied for latest finish in UFC history.)
Lightweight	Arman Tsarukyan	def.	Charles Oliveira	Decision (split) (28–29, 29–28, 29–28)	3	5:00	(Note: UFC Lightweight title eliminator.)
Middleweight	Bo Nickal	def.	Cody Brundage	Submission (rear-naked choke)	2	3:38
Preliminary card (ESPN / ESPN+)
Light Heavyweight	Jiří Procházka	def.	Aleksandar Rakić	TKO (punches)	2	3:17
Featherweight	Aljamain Sterling	def.	Calvin Kattar	Decision (unanimous) (30–27, 30–27, 30–27)	3	5:00
Women's Bantamweight	Kayla Harrison	def.	Holly Holm	Submission (rear-naked choke)	2	1:47
Featherweight	Diego Lopes	def.	Sodiq Yusuff	TKO (punches)	1	1:29
Early preliminary card (ESPN / ESPN+ / UFC Fight Pass)
Lightweight	Renato Moicano	def.	Jalin Turner	TKO (elbows and punches)	2	4:11
Women's Strawweight	Jéssica Andrade	def.	Marina Rodriguez	Decision (split) (28–29, 29–28, 29–28)	3	5:00
Lightweight	Bobby Green	def.	Jim Miller	Decision (unanimous) (29–27, 30–25, 29–26)	3	5:00
Bantamweight	Deiveson Figueiredo	def.	Cody Garbrandt	Submission (rear-naked choke)	2	4:02

== Bonus awards ==
The following fighters received $300,000 bonuses.

- Fight of the Night: Max Holloway vs. Justin Gaethje
- Performance of the Night: Max Holloway and Jiří Procházka

== Aftermath ==
The Nevada State Athletic Commission (NSAC) has withheld the purses of Arman Tsarukyan and Diego Lopes due to their behavior at the event, where Arman Tsarukyan allegedly struck a fan on his way to the octagon, and Diego Lopes for jumping out of the cage. Both fighters met with the NSAC on April 30, 2024, to discuss the incidents. The NSAC decided to withhold 20% of Tsarukyan's fight purse ($31,600 of $158,000) and $5,000 of Lopes' $100,000 payout.

This event won the UFC Honors 2024 Event of the Year award as voted by the fans.

== See also ==
- 2024 in UFC
- List of current UFC fighters
- List of UFC events
