= UFC 299 =

2024 mixed martial event

UFC 299: O'Malley vs. Vera 2
- The poster for UFC 299: O'Malley vs. Vera 2
- Promotion: Ultimate Fighting Championship
- Date: March 9, 2024
- Venue: Kaseya Center
- City: Miami, Florida, United States
- Attendance: 19,165
- Total gate: $14,142,904

Event chronology
| UFC Fight Night: Rozenstruik vs. Gaziev | UFC 299: O'Malley vs. Vera 2 | UFC Fight Night: Tuivasa vs. Tybura |

UFC 299: O'Malley vs. Vera 2 was a mixed martial arts event produced by the Ultimate Fighting Championship that took place on March 9, 2024, at the Kaseya Center in Miami, Florida, United States.

== Background ==
The event marked the promotion's third visit to Miami and first since UFC 287 in April 2023.

A UFC Bantamweight Championship bout between current champion Sean O'Malley and Marlon Vera headlined the event. The pair previously met at UFC 252 in August 2020 which Vera won by first round TKO. Merab Dvalishvili served as backup and potential replacement for this fight.

A five round lightweight bout between former interim UFC Lightweight Champion Dustin Poirier and Benoît Saint Denis took place in the co-main event. The bout was briefly in jeopardy when Poirier indicated the bout would not take place as he had never signed a contract and he was unable to come to terms with the promotion. However, Poirier shortly thereafter retracted his statement describing it as a misunderstanding.

A heavyweight bout between Curtis Blaydes and Jailton Almeida took place at the event. They were previously expected to headline UFC Fight Night: Almeida vs. Lewis in November 2023 but Blaydes withdrew for unknown reasons.

Ian Machado Garry and Geoff Neal were expected to meet in a welterweight bout at this event. They were originally booked for UFC 292 in August 2023, but Neal withdrew due to undisclosed health reasons. However the bout was moved to UFC 298 for unknown reasons.

Former Invicta FC Bantamweight Champion (also former UFC Women's Flyweight Championship challenger) Lauren Murphy was expected to face Karine Silva in a women's flyweight bout. However, Murphy pulled out due to injury and Silva is now expected to face former KSW Women's Flyweight Champion Ariane Lipski at UFC on ESPN 55.

A light heavyweight bout between Ion Cuțelaba and 2018 PFL heavyweight tournament winner Philipe Lins took place at the event. They were previously expected to meet at UFC Fight Night: Dawson vs. Green in October 2023 but Lins withdrew the day of the event for unknown reasons.

At the weigh ins, C.J. Vergara weighed in at 127 pounds, one pound over the flyweight non-title fight limit. His bout proceeded at catchweight and he was fined 30 percent of his purse which went to his opponent Asu Almabayev.

During the event's broadcast, former UFC Women's Strawweight Champion Joanna Jędrzejczyk was announced as the next "modern wing" UFC Hall of Fame inductee during June's International Fight Week festivities in Las Vegas.

== Results ==
Main Card
| Weight class | | | | Method | Round | Time | Notes |
|---|---|---|---|---|---|---|---|
| Bantamweight | Sean O'Malley (c) | def. | Marlon Vera | Decision (unanimous) (50–45, 50–45, 50–44) | 5 | 5:00 | (Note: For the UFC Bantamweight Championship.) |
| Lightweight | Dustin Poirier | def. | Benoît Saint Denis | KO (punches) | 2 | 2:32 |
| Welterweight | Michael Page | def. | Kevin Holland | Decision (unanimous) (29–28, 29–28, 29–28) | 3 | 5:00 |
| Welterweight | Jack Della Maddalena | def. | Gilbert Burns | KO (knee and elbows) | 3 | 3:43 |
| Bantamweight | Petr Yan | def. | Song Yadong | Decision (unanimous) (29–28, 29–28, 29–28) | 3 | 5:00 |
Preliminary card (ESPN / ESPN+ / ESPNews)
| Heavyweight | Curtis Blaydes | def. | Jailton Almeida | KO (punches) | 2 | 0:36 |
| Women's Flyweight | Maycee Barber | def. | Katlyn Cerminara | Decision (unanimous) (30–27, 30–27, 29–28) | 3 | 5:00 |
| Lightweight | Mateusz Gamrot | def. | Rafael dos Anjos | Decision (unanimous) (29–28, 29–28, 30–27) | 3 | 5:00 |
| Bantamweight | Kyler Phillips | def. | Pedro Munhoz | Decision (unanimous) (30–27, 30–27, 30–27) | 3 | 5:00 |
Early preliminary card (ESPN+)
| Light Heavyweight | Philipe Lins | def. | Ion Cuțelaba | Decision (unanimous) (29–28, 29–28, 29–28) | 3 | 5:00 |
| Middleweight | Michel Pereira | def. | Michał Oleksiejczuk | Technical Submission (rear-naked choke) | 1 | 1:01 |
| Heavyweight | Robelis Despaigne | def. | Josh Parisian | TKO (punches) | 1 | 0:18 |
| Catchweight (127 lb) | Asu Almabayev | def. | C.J. Vergara | Decision (unanimous) (30–27, 30–27, 30–27) | 3 | 5:00 |
| Women's Flyweight | Joanne Wood | def. | Maryna Moroz | Decision (split) (28–29, 29–28, 29–28) | 3 | 5:00 |

== Bonus awards ==
The following fighters received $50,000 bonuses.

- Fight of the Night: Dustin Poirier vs. Benoît Saint Denis
- Performance of the Night: Sean O’Malley, Jack Della Maddalena, Curtis Blaydes, Michel Pereira and Robelis Despaigne

== See also ==
- 2024 in UFC
- List of current UFC fighters
- List of UFC events
