= UFC Fight Night: Allen vs. Curtis 2 =

2024 mixed martial event in Nevada, US

- The poster for UFC Fight Night: Allen vs. Curtis 2
- Promotion: Ultimate Fighting Championship
- Date: April 6, 2024
- Venue: UFC Apex
- City: Enterprise, Nevada, United States
- Attendance: Not announced

Event chronology
UFC on ESPN: Blanchfield vs. Fiorot	UFC Fight Night: Allen vs. Curtis 2	UFC 300: Pereira vs. Hill

UFC Fight Night: Allen vs. Curtis 2 (also known as UFC Fight Night 240, UFC on ESPN+ 98 and UFC Vegas 90) was a mixed martial arts event produced by the Ultimate Fighting Championship that took place on April 6, 2024, at the UFC Apex facility in Enterprise, Nevada, part of the Las Vegas Metropolitan Area, United States.

== Background ==
A middleweight bout between former UFC Middleweight Championship challenger Marvin Vettori and former LFA Middleweight Champion Brendan Allen was expected to headline the event. However, on March 14, it was announced that Vettori was out due to an injury. He was replaced by Chris Curtis. The pair previously met at UFC on ESPN: Font vs. Aldo in December 2021, which Curtis won by second-round TKO.

A featherweight bout between Morgan Charrière and Choi Seung-woo was scheduled for this event. However, Choi withdrew for unknown reason and was replaced by Chepe Mariscal.

A middleweight bout between Josh Fremd and César Almeida was scheduled for the event. However, Fremd withdrew from the event for unknown reasons and was replaced by Dylan Budka.

Jose Johnson and Lucas Rocha were expected to meet in a flyweight bout. However, Johnson pulled out due to undisclosed reasons and was replaced by Joshua Van. In turn, Rocha withdrew due to injury and the bout was scrapped.

Alateng Heili was expected to face Victor Hugo in a bantamweight bout at the event. However, Alateng pulled out due to illness on fight week and promotional newcomer Pedro Falcão stepped in as a replacement on three days' notice.

At the weigh-ins, four fighters missed weight:

- Alexander Hernandez weighed in at 147.5 pounds, one and a half pounds over the featherweight non-title fight limit. His bout proceeded at catchweight and he was fined 20% of his purse, which went to his opponent Damon Jackson.
- Cynthia Calvillo weighed in at 119 pounds, three pounds over the strawweight non-title fight limit. As a result, her bout with former LFA Women's Strawweight Champion Piera Rodríguez was cancelled.
- Nora Cornolle and Melissa Mullins weighed in at 138.5 and 138 pounds, 2 and a half and 2 pounds over the bantamweight non-title fight limit respectively. Their bout proceeded at catchweight with neither being issued a fine.

== Results ==
Main card (ESPN+)
Weight class				Method	Round	Time	Notes
Middleweight	Brendan Allen	def.	Chris Curtis	Decision (split) (47–48, 48–47, 49–46)	5	5:00
Catchweight (147.5 lb)	Damon Jackson	def.	Alexander Hernandez	Decision (split) (27–30, 29–28, 29–28)	3	5:00
Featherweight	Chepe Mariscal	def.	Morgan Charrière	Decision (split) (29–28, 27–30, 29–28)	3	5:00
Lightweight	Ignacio Bahamondes	def.	Christos Giagos	KO (head kick)	1	3:34
Lightweight	Charlie Campbell	def.	Trevor Peek	Decision (unanimous) (30–27, 30–27, 30–27)	3	5:00
Preliminary card (ESPN+)
Welterweight	Alex Morono	def.	Court McGee	Decision (unanimous) (29–28, 29–28, 29–28)	3	5:00
Heavyweight	Łukasz Brzeski	def.	Valter Walker	Decision (unanimous) (29–28, 29–28, 29–28)	3	5:00
Women's Bantamweight	Norma Dumont	def.	Germaine de Randamie	Decision (unanimous) (29–28, 29–28, 29–28)	3	5:00
Bantamweight	Victor Hugo	def.	Pedro Falcão	Decision (unanimous) (30–27, 29–28, 29–28)	3	5:00
Bantamweight	Jean Matsumoto	def.	Dan Argueta	Submission (guillotine choke)	2	4:59
Middleweight	César Almeida	def.	Dylan Budka	TKO (punches)	2	2:13
Catchweight (138.5 lb)	Nora Cornolle	def.	Melissa Mullins	TKO (knee to the body and head kicks)	2	3:06

== Bonus awards ==
The following fighters received $50,000 bonuses.

- Fight of the Night: Jose Mariscal vs. Morgan Charrière
- Performance of the Night: Ignacio Bahamondes and César Almeida

== See also ==
- 2024 in UFC
- List of current UFC fighters
- List of UFC events
