= Sharabutdin Magomedov =

Russian mixed martial artist (born 1994)

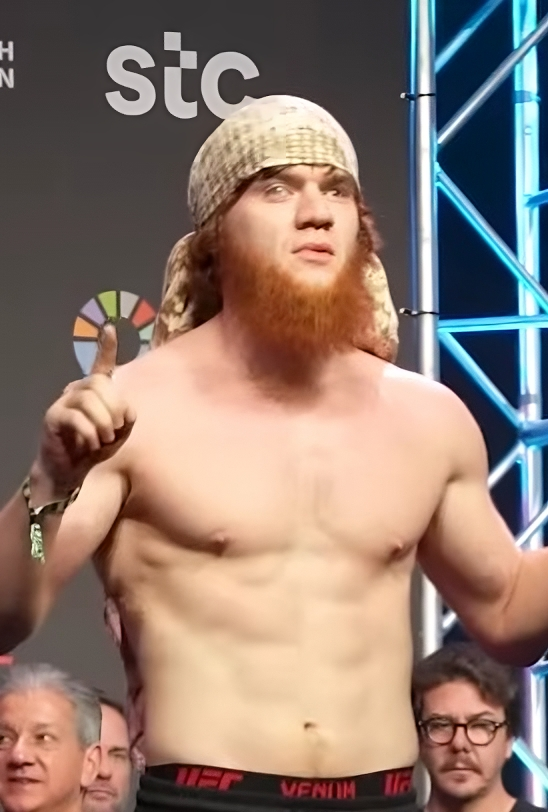
- Magomedov in 2024
- Born: Sharabutdin Magomedovich Magomedov; May 16, 1994 (age 32); Makhachkala, Dagestan, Russia
- Native name: Шарабутдин Магомедов
- Other names: Shara Bullet
- Height: 6 ft 2 in (1.88 m)
- Weight: 186 lb (84 kg; 13 st 4 lb)
- Division: Welterweight (2017–2018); Middleweight (2021–present); Light Heavyweight (2021)
- Reach: 73 in (185 cm)
- Fighting out of: Makhachkala, Dagestan, Russia
- Team: GOR MMA
- Rank: International Master of Sport in Lethwei; Master of Sport in Muay Thai; Master of Sport in Kickboxing; Master of Sport Candidate in Combat Sambo
- Years active: 2017–present

Mixed martial arts record
- Total: 18
- Wins: 17
- By knockout: 12
- By decision: 5
- Losses: 1
- By decision: 1

Other information
- Mixed martial arts record from Sherdog

Sharabutdin Magomedovich Magomedov (Russian: Шарабутдин Магомедович Магомедов; born 16 May 1994) is a Russian professional mixed martial artist, former Muay Thai and Lethwei fighter. He currently competes in the Middleweight division of the Ultimate Fighting Championship (UFC).

== Early life ==
Sharabutdin Magomedov, an ethnic Avar, was born in Dagestan, Russia, in 1994. Football was the first sport he ever played, but he was ultimately kicked off his team after an argument. This led him to venture into martial arts.

== Muay Thai and Lethwei career ==
Magomedov started his combat sports career with boxing, where he had considerable success. After relocating to Moscow, he switched to Muay Thai, where he flourished and won the Russian championship amassing a 18–2 Muay Thai record.

Early in his career, Magomedov suffered a severe eye injury while training in Thailand. Despite multiple surgeries, the damage worsened over time, eventually leaving him blind in one eye. The Russian fighter has openly discussed the impact of this challenge and how Michael Bisping, who won a UFC title despite his own eye injury, became a pivotal source of motivation for him. Despite his success in Muay Thai, his low pay and mounting debts made it difficult for him to find training facilities, prompting him to cross over to MMA.

Magomedov competed in five sanctioned Lethwei bouts under traditional rules and has won the title of Eurasia Lethwei Champion, finishing all of his opponents. He praised Lethwei for its toughness and brutality describing the sport as “bare-knuckle where you can also headbutt your opponent”.

"Muay Thai is one of the toughest sport, but I believe Lethwei is the toughest one" said Magomedov.

== Mixed martial arts career ==
=== Early career ===
Magomedov fought in Asian organizations such as "Chin Woo Men" and "The King Fighting Championship" (both from China), accumulating a record of 11–0 before making his debut in the UFC.

=== Ultimate Fighting Championship ===
Magomedov made his UFC debut against Bruno Silva, on October 21, 2023, at UFC 294. He won the fight via unanimous decision.

Magomedov was scheduled to face Ihor Potieria on June 22, 2024, at UFC on ABC 6. However, Potieria was pulled in order to face Michel Pereira at UFC 301. Magomedov was then rescheduled to face promotional newcomer Joilton Lutterbach at UFC on ABC 6. In turn, Lutterbach withdrew from the bout due to testing positive for a banned substance and was replaced by Antonio Trócoli. Magomedov won by technical knockout in round three. This fight earned him a Performance of the Night award.

Magomedov faced Michał Oleksiejczuk on August 3, 2024, at UFC on ABC 7. He won the fight by unanimous decision. This fight earned him a Fight of the Night award.

Magomedov faced Armen Petrosyan on October 26, 2024, at UFC 308. He won the fight by a double spinning backfist knockout at the end of the second round. This fight earned him another Performance of the Night award.

Magomedov faced Michael Page on February 1, 2025, at UFC Fight Night 250. He lost the fight by unanimous decision leading to his first MMA loss.

Magomedov faced Marc-André Barriault on July 26, 2025, at UFC on ABC 9. He won the fight by unanimous decision. This fight earned him another Fight of the Night award.

Magomedov was scheduled to face Paulo Costa on November 22, 2025, at UFC Fight Night 265. However, Magomedov withdrew from the bout due to undergoing nose surgery.

Magomedov faced Michel Pereira on June 27, 2026 at UFC Fight Night 280. He won the fight by unanimous decision.

Magomedov is scheduled to face former two-time UFC Middleweight Champion Israel Adesanya on December 5, 2026 at UFC Fight Night 295.

== Wrestling & grappling career ==
Magomedov faced Arman Tsarukyan in a submission grappling match for the under 84 kg title at Hype Fighting: Armenia on December 30, 2025. The match ended in a draw and neither man won the title.

Magomedov was originally scheduled to face Jorge Masvidal in a submission grappling match at Hype Fighting: Brazil on March 11, 2026, but Masvidal was replaced by Edson Barboza two days before the event took place. The bout ended in a draw.

On September 5, 2026, Magomdov competed in a freestyle wrestling match at the Real American Freestyle at Moscow, winning against to Neiman Gracie by a score of 11–3.

== Shopping center attack ==
Magomedov was involved in an assault at a shopping center on March 15, 2022, in Dagestan. Magomedov verbally took offense to a man and woman kissing in front of him on an escalator, afterwards Magomedov confronted the man. Bystanders separated them, and Magomedov walked out to an exit. Moments later, camera footage showed Magomedov waiting for the man at the exit, where he sucker-punched him and stomped on his head. The criminal charges are still being decided by the courts. Under these circumstances, his contract with the UFC ended up being postponed.

== Championships and accomplishments ==
=== Mixed martial arts ===
- Arena Global
  - AG Light Heavyweight Championship (One time)
- Ultimate Fighting Championship
  - Fight of the Night (Two times) vs. Michał Oleksiejczuk and Marc-André Barriault
  - Performance of the Night (Two times) vs. Antonio Trócoli and Armen Petrosyan
  - UFC Honors Awards
    - 2024: Fan's Choice Knockout of the Year Nominee vs. Armen Petrosyan
  - UFC.com Awards
    - 2024: Ranked #7 Knockout of the Year vs. Armen Petrosyan
- MMA Fighting
  - 2024 Second Team MMA All-Star

=== Muay Thai ===
- Russian Muay Thai Champion.

=== Lethwei ===
- Eurasia Lethwei Champion

== Mixed martial arts record ==
Professional record breakdown
18 matches	17 wins	1 loss
By knockout	12	0
By decision	5	1

Res.	Record	Opponent	Method	Event	Date	Round	Time	Location	Notes
Win	17–1	Michel Pereira	Decision (unanimous)	UFC Fight Night: Fiziev vs. Torres	June 27, 2026	3	5:00	Baku, Azerbaijan	
Win	16–1	Marc-André Barriault	Decision (unanimous)	UFC on ABC: Whittaker vs. de Ridder	July 26, 2025	3	5:00	Abu Dhabi, United Arab Emirates	Fight of the Night.
Loss	15–1	Michael Page	Decision (unanimous)	UFC Fight Night: Adesanya vs. Imavov	February 1, 2025	3	5:00	Riyadh, Saudi Arabia	
Win	15–0	Armen Petrosyan	KO (spinning backfists)	UFC 308	October 26, 2024	2	4:52	Abu Dhabi, United Arab Emirates	Performance of the Night.
Win	14–0	Michał Oleksiejczuk	Decision (unanimous)	UFC on ABC: Sandhagen vs. Nurmagomedov	August 3, 2024	3	5:00	Abu Dhabi, United Arab Emirates	Fight of the Night.
Win	13–0	Antonio Trócoli	TKO (knee and punches)	UFC on ABC: Whittaker vs. Aliskerov	June 22, 2024	3	2:27	Riyadh, Saudi Arabia	Performance of the Night.
Win	12–0	Bruno Silva	Decision (unanimous)	UFC 294	October 21, 2023	3	5:00	Abu Dhabi, United Arab Emirates	
Win	11–0	Kushal Vyas	KO (knee and punches)	Bangla Fights	December 11, 2022	1	0:08	Phuket, Thailand	
Win	10–0	Mikhail Ragozin	Decision (unanimous)	RCC 13	December 3, 2022	3	5:00	Yekaterinburg, Russia	
Win	9–0	Sergei Martynov	KO (knees)	RCC Intro 22	August 13, 2022	3	2:34	Yekaterinburg, Russia	Return to Middleweight.
Win	8–0	Rodrigo Carlos	TKO (punches)	Arena Global 17	February 26, 2022	1	4:33	Rio de Janeiro, Brazil	Light Heavyweight debut. Won the vacant AG Light Heavyweight Championship.
Win	7–0	Joel dos Santos	TKO (hook kick)	AMC Fight Nights 106	November 27, 2021	2	0:13	Syktyvkar, Russia	
Win	6–0	Mikhail Allakhverdian	KO (elbow)	AMC Fight Nights 105	October 16, 2021	1	4:41	Sochi, Russia	
Win	5–0	Yakub Kadiev	TKO (knees)	AMC Fight Nights 103	July 15, 2021	1	2:35	Sochi, Russia	Middleweight debut.
Win	4–0	Wulan Muhamaitihali	KO (knee to the body)	Chin Woo Men: 2017-2018 Season, Stage 6	March 11, 2018	1	0:56	Guangzhou, China	
Win	3–0	Yeshan Yersen	TKO (punches)	The King FC	February 19, 2018	1	N/A	Tengchong, China	
Win	2–0	Jiayidaer Aili	TKO (leg kick)	Chin Woo Men: 2017-2018 Season, Stage 4	January 21, 2018	2	2:22	Hefei, China	
Win	1–0	Yincang Bao	TKO (punches)	Chin Woo Men: 2017-2018 Season, Stage 2	December 9, 2017	1	0:43	Wuhan, China	Welterweight debut.

== Submission grappling record ==
Draw	0–0–2	(Brazil) Edson Barboza	Draw	Hype FC: Tsarukyan vs. Mokaev	March 11, 2026	(Brazil) Rio de Janeiro
Draw	0–0–1	(Armenia) Arman Tsarukyan	Draw	Hype FC: Akopyan vs. Oev	December 30, 2025	(Armenia) Yerevan
