= UFC on ABC: Whittaker vs. Aliskerov =

2024 mixed martial event in Saudi Arabia

- The poster for UFC on ABC: Whittaker vs. Aliskerov
- Promotion: Ultimate Fighting Championship
- Date: June 22, 2024
- Venue: Kingdom Arena
- City: Riyadh, Saudi Arabia
- Attendance: Not announced

Event chronology
UFC on ESPN: Perez vs. Taira	UFC on ABC: Whittaker vs. Aliskerov	UFC 303: Pereira vs. Procházka 2

UFC on ABC: Whittaker vs. Aliskerov (also known as UFC on ABC 6) was a mixed martial arts event produced by the Ultimate Fighting Championship that took place on June 22, 2024, at the Kingdom Arena in Riyadh, Saudi Arabia.

== Background ==
The promotion was originally expected to make its Saudi Arabia debut at an event on March 2, 2024, but on January 24, Saudi Arabia's chairman of General Entertainment Authority Turki Alalshikh announced the event had been officially postponed until this date, citing "a decision to reschedule was taken to ensure the best caliber of talent will be available to participate".

A middleweight title eliminator bout between former UFC Middleweight Champion (also The Ultimate Fighter: The Smashes welterweight winner) Robert Whittaker and Khamzat Chimaev was expected to headline the event. However, Chimaev withdrew due to an illness and was replaced by Ikram Aliskerov, who was scheduled to fight a week earlier at UFC on ESPN: Perez vs. Taira.

A middleweight bout between Sharabutdin Magomedov and Ihor Potieria was expected to take place at the event. However, Potieria was pulled to face Michel Pereira at UFC 301. He was replaced by promotional newcomer Joilton Lutterbach. In turn, Lutterbach was pulled out on June 19 by the anti-doping commission because of a substance found in his urine and replaced by Antonio Trócoli, who was scheduled to face Aliskerov a week earlier.

Said Nurmagomedov was scheduled to face Montel Jackson in a bantamweight bout. However, Nurmagomedov pulled out due to undisclosed reasons and was replaced by Farid Basharat. In turn, it was reported that Basharat was unable to compete due to an injury and the bout was scrapped.

Abu Azaitar was scheduled to face Denis Tiuliulin in a middleweight bout. However, Azaitar was replaced by Sedriques Dumas due to an injury. In turn, the bout between Dumas and Tiuliulin was postponed to UFC on ABC: Sandhagen vs. Nurmagomedov due to visa reasons related to Dumas.

A featherweight bout between Muhammad Naimov and Melsik Baghdasaryan was expected to take place at the main card. However, Baghdasaryan pulled out during fight week due to a torn labrum in his left shoulder. He was replaced by Felipe Lima.

Former interim UFC Middleweight Championship challenger (also The Ultimate Fighter: Team Jones vs. Team Sonnen middleweight winner) Kelvin Gastelum and Daniel Rodriguez were originally scheduled to meet in a welterweight bout, but it was changed to middleweight during fight week as Gastelum had issues cutting weight.

== Results ==
Main card (ABC / ESPN+)
Weight class				Method	Round	Time	Notes
Middleweight	Robert Whittaker	def.	Ikram Aliskerov	KO (punches)	1	1:49
Heavyweight	Alexander Volkov	def.	Sergei Pavlovich	Decision (unanimous) (30–27, 30–27, 29–28)	3	5:00
Middleweight	Kelvin Gastelum	def.	Daniel Rodriguez	Decision (unanimous) (29–28, 30–27, 30–27)	3	5:00
Middleweight	Sharabutdin Magomedov	def.	Antonio Trócoli	TKO (knee and punches)	3	2:27
Light Heavyweight	Volkan Oezdemir	def.	Johnny Walker	KO (punch)	1	2:28
Preliminary card (ESPN / ESPN+)
Lightweight	Nasrat Haqparast	def.	Jared Gordon	Decision (split) (28–29, 29–28, 29–28)	3	5:00
Featherweight	Felipe Lima	def.	Muhammad Naimov	Submission (rear-naked choke)	3	1:15
Welterweight	Rinat Fakhretdinov	def.	Nicolas Dalby	Decision (split) (29–28, 28–29, 29–28)	3	5:00
Bantamweight	Muin Gafurov	def.	Kang Kyung-ho	Decision (unanimous) (30–27, 30–27, 30–27)	3	5:00
Light Heavyweight	Magomed Gadzhiyasulov	def.	Brendson Ribeiro	Decision (majority) (29–28, 29–28, 28–28)	3	5:00
Bantamweight	Lee Chang-ho	def.	Xiao Long	Decision (split) (28–29, 29–28, 29–28)	3	5:00	(Note: Road to UFC Season 2 Bantamweight Tournament Final.)

== Bonus awards ==
The following fighters received $50,000 bonuses.

- Fight of the Night: No bonus awarded.
- Performance of the Night: Robert Whittaker, Sharabutdin Magomedov, Volkan Oezdemir, and Felipe Lima

== See also ==
- 2024 in UFC
- List of current UFC fighters
- List of UFC events
