= UFC 304 =

2024 mixed martial event in Manchester, England

UFC 304: Edwards vs. Muhammad 2
- The poster for UFC 304: Edwards vs. Muhammad 2
- Promotion: Ultimate Fighting Championship
- Date: July 27, 2024
- Venue: Co-op Live
- City: Manchester, England
- Attendance: 17,907
- Total gate: $6,720,000

Event chronology
UFC on ESPN: Lemos vs. Jandiroba	UFC 304: Edwards vs. Muhammad 2	UFC on ABC: Sandhagen vs. Nurmagomedov

UFC 304: Edwards vs. Muhammad 2 was a mixed martial arts event produced by the Ultimate Fighting Championship that took place on July 27, 2024, at the Co-op Live in Manchester, England.

== Background ==
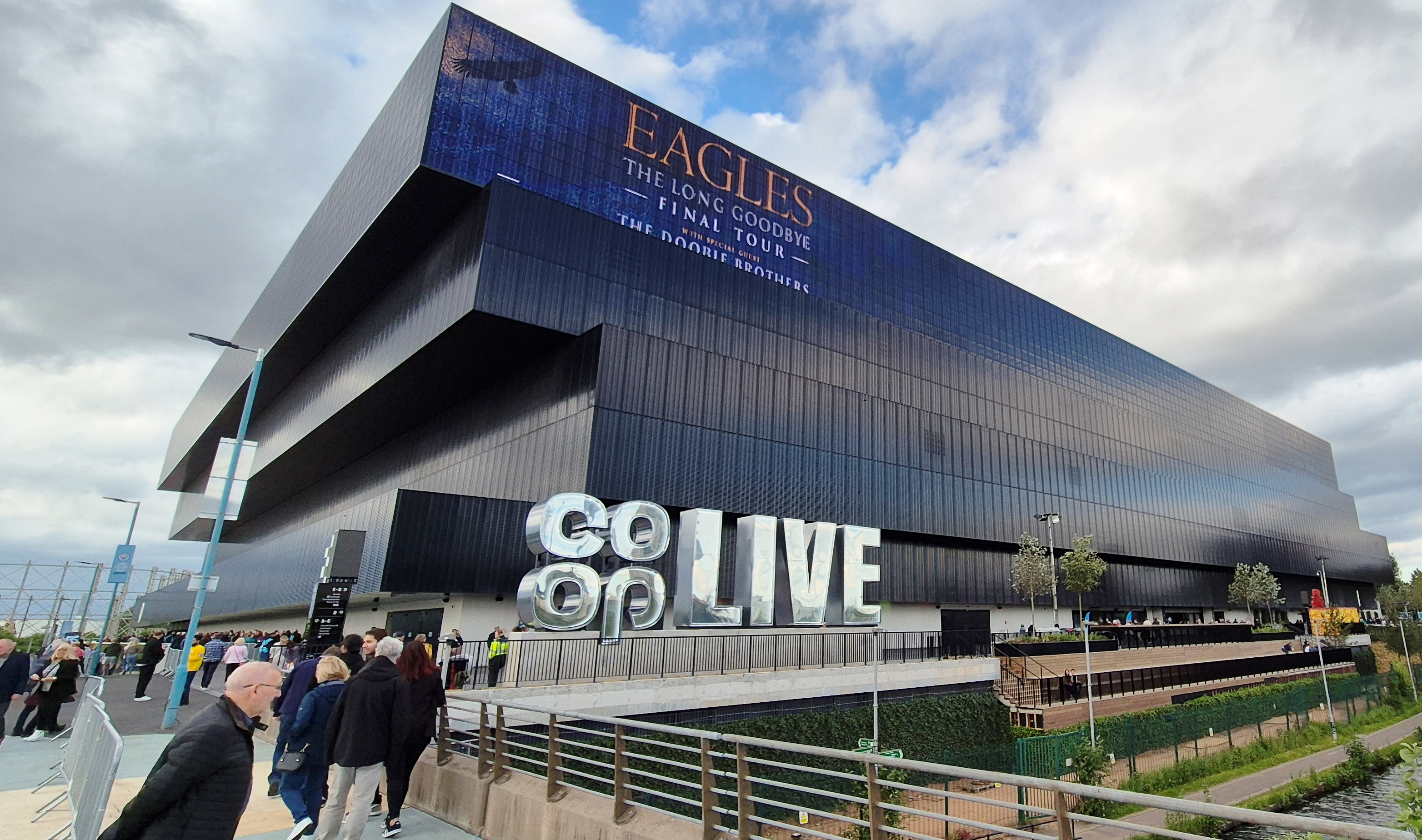
This was the first sporting event to take place at the Co-op Live arena, which opened in April 2024.

The event marked the promotion's fifth visit to Manchester and first since UFC 204 in October 2016. Despite the event taking place in Manchester, the event was held based on Pacific Daylight Time (PDT, UTC-7) (Las Vegas) time with preliminary fights starting at 23.00 British Summer Time (15.00 PDT), and the main card starting 03.00 BST, which is the standard start time for UFC pay-per-view events of 19.00 PDT, which drew massive criticism from fans and fighters. Fans believed the matches should have started earlier (19.00 BST, or 11.00 PDT) for the UK audience.

A UFC Welterweight Championship bout between current champion Leon Edwards and Belal Muhammad headlined the event. The pair previously fought at UFC Fight Night: Edwards vs. Muhammad in March 2021, where the fight was declared a no contest following an accidental eye poke which left Muhammad unable to continue.

An interim UFC Heavyweight Championship bout between the title holder Tom Aspinall and Curtis Blaydes co-headlined the event. They previously met at UFC Fight Night: Blaydes vs. Aspinall in July 2022 in which Blaydes won after Aspinall injured his knee fifteen seconds into the bout keeping him out of competition for a year.

A middleweight bout between Christian Leroy Duncan and Robert Bryczek was scheduled for this event. However, Bryczek withdrew from the fight for unknown reasons and was replaced by former LFA Middleweight Champion Gregory Rodrigues.

A women's strawweight bout between Ravena Oliveira and Shauna Bannon was scheduled for this event. However, Oliveira withdrew from the bout due to an injury and was replaced with promotional newcomer Alice Ardelean.

A bantamweight bout between Ramon Taveras and Caolán Loughran was scheduled for this event. However, Taveras had to withdraw from the bout due to an injury and was reportedly replaced by Hecher Sosa. It was later reported that Sosa would not be competing at the event as Loughran would face Jake Hadley instead. At the weigh-ins, Hadley weighed in at 137 pounds, half a pound over the bantamweight non-title fight limit. The bout proceeded at catchweight and Hadley was fined 20 percent of his purse which went to Loughran.

The event originally featured $50,000 fight night bonuses, which were raised to $100,000 before the event.

== Results ==
Main card
Weight class				Method	Round	Time	Notes
Welterweight	Belal Muhammad	def.	Leon Edwards (c)	Decision (unanimous) (48–47, 48–47, 49–46)	5	5:00	(Note: For the UFC Welterweight Championship.)
Heavyweight	Tom Aspinall (ic)	def.	Curtis Blaydes	KO (punches)	1	1:00	(Note: For the interim UFC Heavyweight Championship.)
Lightweight	Paddy Pimblett	def.	King Green	Technical Submission (triangle choke)	1	3:22
Middleweight	Gregory Rodrigues	def.	Christian Leroy Duncan	Decision (unanimous) (30–27, 30–27, 30–27)	3	5:00
Featherweight	Arnold Allen	def.	Giga Chikadze	Decision (unanimous) (29–28, 29–28, 29–28)	3	5:00
Preliminary card (ESPN 2 / ESPN+)
Featherweight	Nathaniel Wood	def.	Daniel Pineda	Decision (unanimous) (29–27, 29–27, 29–28)	3	5:00
Women's Strawweight	Bruna Brasil	def.	Molly McCann	Decision (unanimous) (30–27, 30–27, 29–28)	3	5:00
Catchweight (137 lb)	Jake Hadley	def.	Caolán Loughran	Decision (unanimous) (30–27, 30–27, 29–28)	3	5:00
Flyweight	Muhammad Mokaev	def.	Manel Kape	Decision (unanimous) (29–28, 29–28, 30–27)	3	5:00
Early preliminary card (ESPN+ / UFC Fight Pass)
Welterweight	Oban Elliott	def.	Preston Parsons	Decision (unanimous) (29–28, 30–27, 30–27)	3	5:00
Light Heavyweight	Modestas Bukauskas	def.	Marcin Prachnio	Submission (arm-triangle choke)	3	3:12
Welterweight	Sam Patterson	def.	Kiefer Crosbie	Submission (arm-triangle choke)	1	2:50
Heavyweight	Mick Parkin	def.	Łukasz Brzeski	KO (punches)	1	3:23
Women's Strawweight	Shauna Bannon	def.	Alice Ardelean	Decision (split) (28–29, 29–28, 30–27)	3	5:00

== Bonus awards ==
The following fighters received bonuses.

- Fight of the Night: No bonus awarded.
- Performance of the Night ($200,000): Paddy Pimblett
- Performance of the Night ($100,000): Tom Aspinall and Mick Parkin

== See also ==
- 2024 in UFC
- List of current UFC fighters
- List of UFC events
