= Mitch Ramirez =

American mixed martial artist (born 1992)

- Born: Mitch Ramirez; November 3, 1992 (age 33); Utah, U.S.
- Height: 5 ft 11 in (180 cm)
- Weight: 156 lb (71 kg; 11 st 2 lb)
- Division: Lightweight
- Reach: 71 in (180 cm)
- Fighting out of: Las Vegas, Nevada, U.S.
- Team: Syndicate MMA
- Years active: 2019 - present

Mixed martial arts record
- Total: 11
- Wins: 8
- By knockout: 5
- By submission: 2
- By decision: 1
- Losses: 3
- By knockout: 3

Amateur record
- Total: 5
- Wins: 5
- By knockout: 2
- By submission: 1
- By decision: 2

Mitch Ramirez (born November 3, 1992) is an American professional mixed martial artist. He is currently unranked in the UFC Lightweight Division.

== Career ==
Mitch Ramirez trained under John Wood at Syndicate MMA, where he obtained the nickname "The Fight Stalker", due to his name's resemblance, and his geographical proximity, to serial killer Richard Ramirez.

A professional since 2019, he originally competed in Steelfist, LFA and The Fierce Fighting Championship, racking up seven straight wins. He was then supposedly slated to appear on The Ultimate Fighter 31, but was later withdrawn. Ramirez caused minor controversy by claiming this was at the behest of Conor McGregor, which McGregor denied.

Ramirez would then compete in the Dana White Contender Series, but lost to Carlos Prates via TKO. Despite this, he was signed to a UFC deal, debuting at UFC Vegas 88 as a short-notice replacement for Brad Riddell, losing to Thiago Moises.

He would next fight in the UFC over a year later, losing to Mike Davis by second-round TKO.

He is slated to fight Chase Hooper on July 18, 2026 at UFC Oklahoma City.

== Personal life ==
Ramirez is in a relationship with retired former UFC fighter Cynthia Calvillo.
