= Mick Parkin =

English mixed martial artist (born 1995)

- Born: 2 October 1995 (age 31); Sunderland, Tyne and Wear, England
- Height: 6 ft 3 in (1.91 m)
- Weight: 264 lb (120 kg; 18 st 12 lb)
- Division: Heavyweight
- Reach: 79 in (200 cm)
- Fighting out of: Sunderland, Tyne and Wear, England
- Team: Team Fish Tank MMA
- Rank: Brown belt in Brazilian Jiu-Jitsu
- Years active: 2019–present

Mixed martial arts record
- Total: 12
- Wins: 10
- By knockout: 6
- By submission: 1
- By decision: 3
- Losses: 2
- By knockout: 1
- By decision: 1

Other information
- Mixed martial arts record from Sherdog

Mick Parkin (born 2 October 1995) is an English mixed martial artist who competes in the heavyweight division of the Ultimate Fighting Championship. A professional since 2019, Parkin earned his contract on Dana White's Contender Series, winning by first round submission.

== Mixed martial arts career ==
=== Early career ===
Parkin acquired a record of 5–0 competing on the UK regional scene winning all five fights by stoppage inside of two rounds.

=== Dana White's Contender Series ===
Parkin was then booked to compete on Week 5 of Season 6 of Dana White's Contender Series on 23 August 2022 against fellow undefeated prospect Eduardo Neves. He would win the fight via first round submission and was awarded a contract by Dana White.

=== Ultimate Fighting Championship ===
After earning his contract, Parkin made his UFC debut at UFC Fight Night 224 against Jamal Pogues on 22 July 2023. He won the fight via unanimous decision. This would mark the first time in his career that he had gone to the scorecards.

Parkin would next face Caio Machado at UFC Fight Night 232 on 18 November 2023. He won the fight via unanimous decision.

Parkin was then scheduled to face TUF 30 Heavyweight Winner Mohammed Usman at UFC on ESPN 53 on 23 March 2024. Parkin would remain undefeated, winning once again by unanimous decision.

Parkin's next fight was against Łukasz Brzeski at UFC 304 on 27 July 2024. He won the fight via first-round knockout, marking his first stoppage victory inside the UFC. This win earned him the Performance of the Night award.

Parkin faced Marcin Tybura at UFC Fight Night 255 on 22 March 2025. He lost the fight by unanimous decision leading to his first loss in MMA.

Parkin was scheduled to face Mario Pinto on 21 March 2026 at UFC Fight Night 270. However, Parkin withdrew for undisclosed reasons and was replaced by promotional newcomer Felipe Franco.

Parkin faced Johnny Walker on 3 October 2026 at UFC 332. He lost the fight by knockout via a knee in the first round.

== Championships and accomplishments ==
=== Mixed martial arts ===
- Ultimate Fighting Championship
  - Performance of the Night (One time) vs. Łukasz Brzeski

== Mixed martial arts record ==
Professional record breakdown
| 12 matches | 10 wins | 2 losses |
| By knockout | 6 | 1 |
| By submission | 1 | 0 |
| By decision | 3 | 1 |

| Res. | Record | Opponent | Method | Event | Date | Round | Time | Location | Notes |
|---|---|---|---|---|---|---|---|---|---|
| Loss | 10–2 | Johnny Walker | KO (knee) | UFC 332 | 3 October 2026 | 1 | 3:35 | Salt Lake City, Utah, United States | |
| Loss | 10–1 | Marcin Tybura | Decision (unanimous) | UFC Fight Night: Edwards vs. Brady | 22 March 2025 | 3 | 5:00 | London, England | |
| Win | 10–0 | Łukasz Brzeski | KO (punches) | UFC 304 | 27 July 2024 | 1 | 3:23 | Manchester, England | Performance of the Night. |
| Win | 9–0 | Mohammed Usman | Decision (unanimous) | UFC on ESPN: Ribas vs. Namajunas | 23 March 2024 | 3 | 5:00 | Las Vegas, Nevada, United States | |
| Win | 8–0 | Caio Machado | Decision (unanimous) | UFC Fight Night: Allen vs. Craig | 18 November 2023 | 3 | 5:00 | Las Vegas, Nevada, United States | |
| Win | 7–0 | Jamal Pogues | Decision (unanimous) | UFC Fight Night: Aspinall vs. Tybura | 22 July 2023 | 3 | 5:00 | London, England | |
| Win | 6–0 | Eduardo Neves | Submission (rear-naked choke) | Dana White's Contender Series 51 | 23 August 2022 | 1 | 1:57 | Las Vegas, Nevada, United States | |
| Win | 5–0 | Fatih Aktas | TKO (punches and elbows) | Rise and Conquer 10 | 21 May 2022 | 2 | 1:43 | Houghton-le-Spring, England | |
| Win | 4–0 | Ashley Pollard | TKO (punches) | Rise and Conquer 9 | 28 November 2021 | 2 | 3:43 | Sunderland, England | |
| Win | 3–0 | Szymon Szynkiewicz | TKO (punches) | Olympus FC: Revival | 26 September 2021 | 1 | 3:05 | Houghton-le-Spring, England | |
| Win | 2–0 | Jan Lysak | TKO (punches) | Caged Steel 25 | 10 April 2021 | 1 | 2:10 | Sheffield, England | |
| Win | 1–0 | Tomas Vaicikas | TKO (elbow and punches) | Almighty FC 13 | 6 July 2019 | 1 | 0:18 | York, England | Heavyweight debut. |

== See also ==
- List of current UFC fighters
- List of Dana White's Contender Series alumni
- List of male mixed martial artists
