= UFC 301 =

2024 mixed martial event in Rio de Janeiro, Brazil

UFC 301: Pantoja vs. Erceg
- The poster for UFC 301: Pantoja vs. Erceg
- Promotion: Ultimate Fighting Championship
- Date: May 4, 2024
- Venue: Farmasi Arena
- City: Rio de Janeiro, Brazil
- Attendance: 14,514
- Total gate: Not announced
- Buyrate: 67,000

Event chronology
UFC on ESPN: Nicolau vs. Perez	UFC 301: Pantoja vs. Erceg	UFC on ESPN: Lewis vs. Nascimento

UFC 301: Pantoja vs. Erceg was a mixed martial arts event produced by the Ultimate Fighting Championship that took place on May 4, 2024, at the Farmasi Arena, in Rio de Janeiro, Brazil.

== Background ==
The event marked the promotion's 12th visit to Rio de Janeiro and first since UFC 283 in January 2023.

A UFC Flyweight Championship bout between current champion Alexandre Pantoja and Steve Erceg headlined the event.

Former WEC Featherweight Champion and two-time UFC Featherweight Champion José Aldo made his return in a bantamweight bout against Jonathan Martinez, after retiring in September 2022.

A lightweight bout between Ismael Bonfim and Vinc Pichel took place at the event. The pair was previously expected to meet at UFC Fight Night: Almeida vs. Lewis but the bout was scrapped after Bonfim missed weight.

A middleweight bout between Michel Pereira and Makhmud Muradov was expected to take place at the event. However, Muradov withdrew due to an infection. He was replaced by Ihor Potieria, who was also scheduled to compete against Sharabutdin Magomedov at UFC on ABC: Whittaker vs. Chimaev on June 22.

A featherweight bout between Jean Silva and William Gomis was scheduled for this event. However, the bout was eventually cancelled due to Gomis suffering a weight cut related illness.

During the event's broadcast, former UFC Light Heavyweight Champion (also the 2005 PRIDE Middleweight Grand Prix Champion) Maurício Rua was announced as the next "pioneer wing" UFC Hall of Fame inductee during June's International Fight Week festivities in Las Vegas. Rua was already a UFC Hall of Famer himself after a light heavyweight bout that took place in November 2011 at UFC 139 against the former PRIDE Welterweight, PRIDE Middleweight and former Strikeforce Light Heavyweight Champion Dan Henderson (also a former UFC Middleweight and Light Heavyweight title challenger) was inducted in the "fight wing" section as part of the 2018 class.

== Results ==
Main card (ESPN+ PPV)
Weight class				Method	Round	Time	Notes
Flyweight	Alexandre Pantoja (c)	def.	Steve Erceg	Decision (unanimous) (48–47, 48–47, 49–46)	5	5:00	(Note: For the UFC Flyweight Championship.)
Bantamweight	José Aldo	def.	Jonathan Martinez	Decision (unanimous) (30–27, 30–27, 30–27)	3	5:00
Light Heavyweight	Anthony Smith	def.	Vitor Petrino	Submission (guillotine choke)	1	2:00
Middleweight	Michel Pereira	def.	Ihor Potieria	Submission (guillotine choke)	1	0:54
Middleweight	Caio Borralho	def.	Paul Craig	KO (punches)	2	2:10
Preliminary card (ESPN / ESPN+)
Featherweight	Joanderson Brito	def.	Jack Shore	TKO (doctor stoppage)	2	3:35
Women's Strawweight	Iasmin Lucindo	def.	Karolina Kowalkiewicz	Decision (unanimous) (30–27, 30–27, 30–27)	3	5:00
Lightweight	Myktybek Orolbai	def.	Elves Brener	Decision (unanimous) (29–27, 29–27, 29–27)	3	5:00	(Note: Orolbai was deducted 1 point in round 3 due to grabbing the fence.)
Lightweight	Drakkar Klose	def.	Joaquim Silva	Decision (unanimous) (29–28, 29–28, 29–28)	3	5:00
Early preliminary card (ESPN+)
Lightweight	Maurício Ruffy	def.	Jamie Mullarkey	TKO (punches)	1	4:42
Women's Flyweight	Dione Barbosa	def.	Ernesta Kareckaitė	Decision (unanimous) (29–28, 29–28, 29–28)	3	5:00
Lightweight	Ismael Bonfim	def.	Vinc Pichel	Decision (unanimous) (30–27, 30–27, 30–27)	3	5:00
Flyweight	Alessandro Costa	def.	Kevin Borjas	TKO (punches)	2	1:35

== Bonus awards ==
The following fighters received $50,000 bonuses.

- Fight of the Night: No bonus awarded.
- Performance of the Night: Michel Pereira, Caio Borralho, Maurício Ruffy, and Alessandro Costa

== See also ==
- 2024 in UFC
- List of current UFC fighters
- List of UFC events
