= Arman Tsarukyan =

Armenian-Russian mixed martial artist (born 1996)

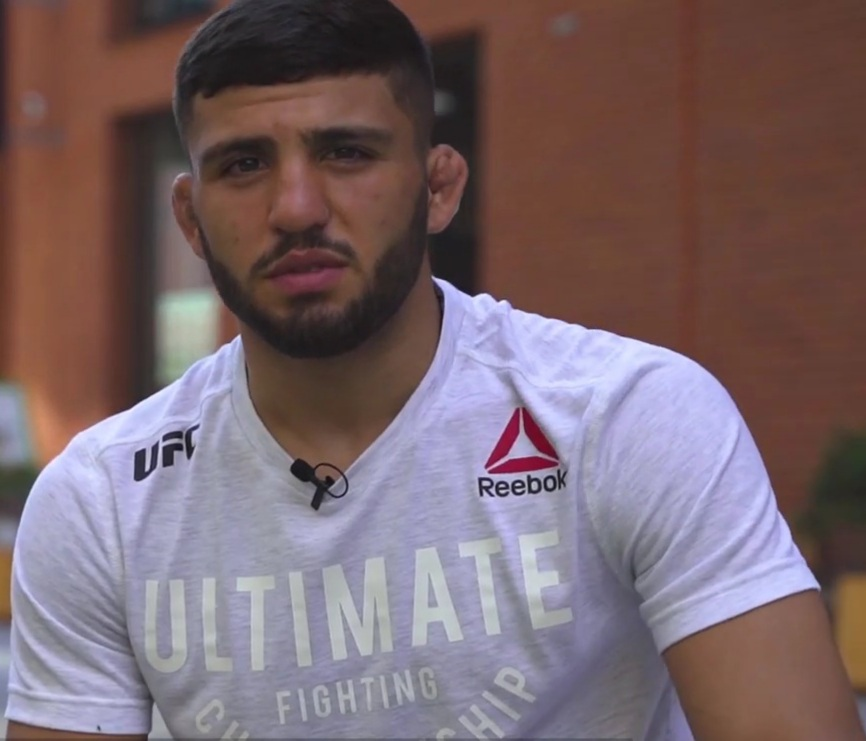
- Tsarukyan in 2019
- Born: Arman Nairovich Tsarukyan; October 11, 1996 (age 30); Akhalkalaki, Samtskhe–Javakheti, Georgia
- Native name: Արման Նաիրիի Ծառուկյան; Арман Наирович Царукян
- Nickname: Batman; Akhalkalakets (formerly)
- Nationality: Armenian; Russian
- Height: 5 ft 7 in (1.70 m)
- Weight: 155 lb (70 kg; 11.1 st)
- Division: Lightweight (2015–present); Featherweight (2017)
- Reach: 72.5 in (184 cm)
- Style: Freestyle wrestling Submission grappling
- Stance: Orthodox
- Fighting out of: Yerevan, Armenia
- Team: Lion Heart; American Top Team (2019–present)
- Rank: Master of Sport in MMA; Master of Sport in Freestyle wrestling
- Years active: 2015–present

Mixed martial arts record
- Total: 27
- Wins: 24
- By knockout: 10
- By submission: 6
- By decision: 8
- Losses: 3
- By knockout: 1
- By decision: 2

Other information
- Mixed martial arts record from Sherdog

Submission grappling record
- Total: 7
- Wins: 6
- Losses: 0
- Draws: 1

Freestyle wrestling record
- Total: 8
- Wins: 7
- Losses: 1

Arman Nairovich Tsarukyan (Armenian: Արման Նաիրիի Ծառուկյան, Russian: Арман Наирович Царукян; IPA: [/ɐrˈman nɐjˈrovʲɪtɕ tsɐrʊˈkʲan/], born October 11, 1996) is an Armenian and Russian professional mixed martial artist, submission grappler, and freestyle wrestler. He currently competes in the lightweight division of the Ultimate Fighting Championship (UFC). As of January 27, 2026, he is #2 in the Meta UFC lightweight rankings and as of September 22, 2026, he is #13 in the UFC men's pound-for-pound rankings.

== Background ==
Tsarukyan was born into an Armenian family in Akhalkalaki, Samtskhe–Javakheti, Georgia, near the Armenian border. Arman's father, Nairi Tsarukyan, is a businessman, engaged in the construction business. Arman is the middle child with an older brother and a younger sister. The family moved to Russia when Arman was three years old to pursue better opportunities in life, eventually settling in Khabarovsk.

In his youth, Tsarukyan had multiple sporting interests. He started freestyle wrestling and fared well in the sport, but got interested in ice hockey later and continued playing it for several years. He played for the junior team of Hockey Club Amur. However, when Arman was approaching adulthood, he was forced to stop hockey in order to aid his father working in construction. In a Q&A on UFC.com, Tsarukyan said he played ice hockey for six years before starting MMA. During his wrestling career, he attained the rank of Master of Sports. Before turning professional, he also earned a second Master of Sports rank in mixed martial arts.

While playing hockey, he had harbored aspirations of reaching the National Hockey League (NHL), but later cited disillusionment with perceived corruption within the Russian junior hockey system as a significant factor in his departure from the sport. In a Q&A on UFC.com, Tsarukyan said he won multiple wrestling and grappling tournaments in amateur competition.

== Mixed martial arts career ==
=== Early career ===
Tsarukyan made his professional debut in mixed martial arts in 2015 against Shamil Olokhanov and won by technical knockout in the first round. He lost his next fight against Alexander Belikh by first-round knockout. Arman continued fighting for mixed martial arts promotions in Russia and Asia, winning his next 12 fights with 9 finishes, including a first round submission victory against Belikh to avenge his first loss. He compiled a 13–1 record prior to signing a four-fight contract with the UFC.

In July 2018, Tsarukyan was one of the winners of the 2018 Tiger Muay Thai Tryouts in Phuket, earning a place on the professional fight team.

=== Ultimate Fighting Championship ===
Tsarukyan made his UFC debut against future lightweight champion Islam Makhachev, on April 20, 2019, at UFC Fight Night 149. The bout featured frequent wrestling exchanges and a high pace. Tsarukyan lost via unanimous decision, and the fight was regarded by some media outlets as one of Makhachev's tougher early-career tests. This fight earned him the Fight of the Night bonus.

Tsarukyan faced Olivier Aubin-Mercier on July 27, 2019, at UFC 240 and won the fight via unanimous decision.

Tsarukyan was expected to face Davi Ramos on April 11, 2020, at UFC Fight Night: Overeem vs. Harris. Due to the COVID-19 pandemic, the event was postponed. The bout was rescheduled for UFC Fight Night 172 on July 19, 2020. He won the fight via unanimous decision.

Tsarukyan was expected to face Nasrat Haqparast on January 24, 2021, at UFC 257. However, on the day of the weigh-ins, Haqparast pulled out of the fight citing an illness. The promotion negotiated a matchup between Tsarukyan and Matt Frevola. Tsarukyan forfeited 20% of his purse after missing weight, which went to Frevola. Tsarukyan won the fight via unanimous decision.

Tsarukyan faced Christos Giagos on September 18, 2021, at UFC Fight Night 192. He won the fight via technical knockout in round one. This win earned him the Performance of the Night award.

As the first bout of his new four-fight contract, Tsarukyan faced Joel Álvarez on February 26, 2022, at UFC Fight Night 202. He won the bout via ground-and-pound TKO in the second round. The win also earned Tsarukyan his second consecutive Performance of the Night bonus award.

Tsarukyan faced Mateusz Gamrot on June 25, 2022, at UFC on ESPN 38. He lost the closely contested fight via unanimous decision. 15 of 22 MMA media outlets scored the bout in favor of Tsarukyan. Both fighters earned the Fight of the Night award.

As the first bout of his new, four-fight contract, Tsarukyan faced Damir Ismagulov on December 17, 2022, at UFC Fight Night 216. He won the fight via unanimous decision.

Tsarukyan was scheduled to face Renato Moicano on April 29, 2023, at UFC on ESPN 45. However, Moicano withdrew due to an injury and Tsarukyan was pulled from the card as well.

Tsarukyan faced Joaquim Silva on June 17, 2023, at UFC on ESPN 47. He won the bout via TKO in the third round.

Tsarukyan faced Beneil Dariush on December 2, 2023, in the main event at UFC on ESPN 52. He won the fight in 64 seconds by first-round knockout due to a knee to the head followed by punches. The fight earned him the Performance of the Night award. Tsarukyan faced former UFC Lightweight champion Charles Oliveira on April 13, 2024, at UFC 300. He won the bout by split decision. 21 of 29 MMA media outlets scored the bout in favor of Tsarukyan. Tsarukyan claimed Mike Bell, the judge who scored the fight for Oliveira, later admitted he made a mistake and apologized to him over a phone call with Tsarukyan’s coach.

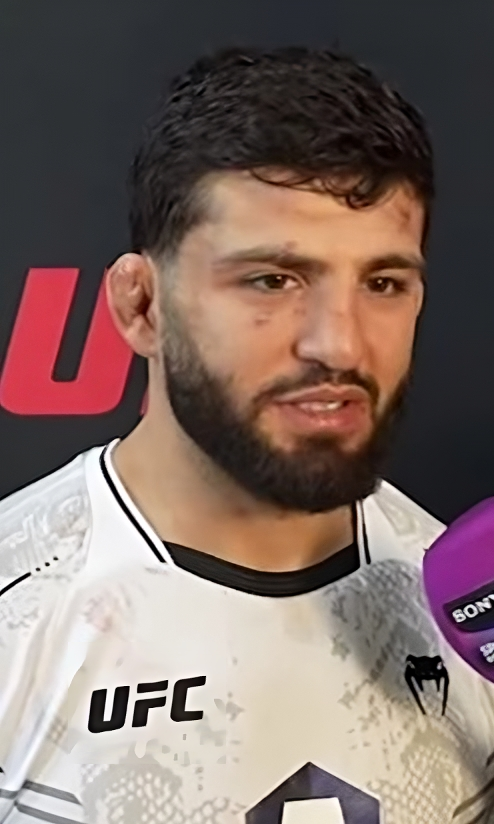
Tsarukyan in 2024

While walking to the octagon at UFC 300, Tsarukyan threw a punch at a fan who flipped him off. The fan later apologized for provoking Tsarukyan and said wouldn't pursue legal action. On June 25, 2024, the Nevada State Athletic Commission (NSAC) fined Tsarukyan $25,000 and banned him from competition for nine months, making him ineligible to compete until January 12, 2025, unless he completed an NSAC-approved anti-bullying public service announcement, which would reduce the suspension to six months, making him eligible to compete on October 12, 2024. After UFC lightweight champion Makhachev suffered a hand injury and was unable to make a late 2024 return, Tsarukyan decided not to do the anti-bullying PSA.

Tsarukyan was scheduled to face Islam Makhachev in a rematch and for the UFC Lightweight Championship on January 18, 2025, at UFC 311. However, Tsarukyan pulled out due to a sciatic nerve back injury during a sparring session. He was replaced by Renato Moicano.

Tsarukyan successfully weighed in on June 27, 2025, as the backup for the lightweight title bout between Ilia Topuria and Charles Oliveira at UFC 317.

Tsarukyan faced Dan Hooker in the main event on November 22, 2025, at UFC Fight Night 265. He won the fight via an arm-triangle choke submission in the second round. This fight earned him another Performance of the Night award.

In November 2025, after lightweight champion Ilia Topuria announced he would take time away from competition for personal reasons, the UFC booked an interim lightweight title bout between Justin Gaethje and Paddy Pimblett for UFC 324. White said Tsarukyan would need to work his way back to a title shot and said he did not care about Tsarukyan’s ranking position when discussing the matchmaking decision.

The booking drew criticism from fighters and media. Former lightweight champion Islam Makhachev said Tsarukyan should have gotten the title shot and questioned the promotion’s matchmaking. UFC Hall of Famer Daniel Cormier argued that a matchup between Topuria and Tsarukyan was necessary to settle the division’s top spot. Journalist Ariel Helwani also criticized the decision publicly.

Tsarukyan was reportedly set to challenge for the UFC "BMF" title in a rematch against Charles Oliveira on September 19, 2026 at UFC 331. However, the bout was changed to a non-title five-round bout instead. After Oliveira withdrew to mourn the death of his teammate Allan Nascimento, the promotion announced that Tsarukyan would instead face Maurício Ruffy. Tsarukyan defeated Ruffy by knockout via elbows in the first round. This fight earned him a $100,000 Performance of the Night award.

== Professional grappling career ==
As a grappler, Tsarukyan competes in ACBJJ , (Note: Absolute Championship Akhmat (ACA) refers to its grappling brand as Absolute Championship of Brazilian Jiu-Jitsu (ACBJJ).) where he is the inaugural holder of the ACBJJ "All Star" title.

Tsarukyan won the expert middleweight division of NAGA Los Angeles on October 1, 2023, submitting all three of his opponents.

Tsarukyan defeated Makkasharip Zaynukov via unanimous decision at Pit Submission Series 12, held as part of Karate Combat 54, on May 2, 2025.

Tsarukyan faced Patricky "Pitbull" Freire in the main event of ADXC 10 on May 31, 2025. He won the match by submission with a rear-naked choke.

Tsarukyan faced former UFC lightweight champion Benson Henderson at ACBJJ 18 in Moscow on September 19, 2025, and won after putting Henderson unconscious with an arm-triangle choke; the official result was ruled a technical decision.

Tsarukyan defeated Mehdi Baydulaev via submission with a rear-naked choke in the final minute of their main event grappling match at ACBJJ 20 on December 17, 2025, in Moscow. He won the "All-Star Title" in this no-gi jiu-jitsu contest, where Baydulaev served as a last-minute replacement.

Tsarukyan faced Sharabutdin Magomedov in a submission-only grappling match at Hype Fighting Championship on December 30, 2025, in Yerevan, Armenia. The match ended in a draw and neither man won the title.

Tsarukyan was scheduled to rematch Georgio Poullas in a submission-only grappling match at Hype Brazil on March 11, 2026 in Rio de Janeiro, Brazil. Poullas later withdrew from the bout, and it was removed from the event lineup. Muhammad Mokaev then stepped in to replace Poullas on two days’ notice. Arman won the bout via technical submission (rear-naked choke) at 7:46 of the first round after rendering Mokaev unconscious.

== Freestyle wrestling career ==
Tsarukyan made his freestyle wrestling debut against four-time NCAA Division I All-American Lance Palmer at RAF 05 on January 10, 2026 at Amerant Bank Arena in Sunrise, Florida. He won the bout via technical fall (10–0) in the first period.

Tsarukyan faced another former NCAA Division I wrestler in Georgio Poullas at RAF 06 on February 28, 2026, at Mullett Arena in Tempe, Arizona, United States. He won the match by points (5–3). A post-match brawl ignited after Tsarukyan struck his opponent following his victory.

Tsarukyan rematched Poullas at RAF 07 on March 28, 2026 in the main event and won by decision (9–3).

Tsarukyan defeated two-time NCAA Division I National qualifier Urijah Faber at RAF 08 on April 18, 2026 in the main event and won by technical fall (13–1). The bout was promoted to the main event after Henry Cejudo withdrew from the card due to an injury.

Tsarukyan defeated Keelon Jimison by technical fall (16–5) at RAF 09 on May 30, 2026.

Tsarukyan defeated Tony Ferguson by technical fall (10–0) at RAF 10 on June 13, 2026.

He faced Kuat Khamitov at RAF Georgia on July 11, 2026.

Tsarukyan faced Colby Covington at RAF 11 in the main event for the inaugural RAF Cruiserweight Crossover Championship on July 18, 2026, losing the match on points (5-3). This fight earned him a Match of the Night award.

Tsarukyan defeated Dillon Danis by technical fall for the inaugural RAF Middleweight Crossover Championship on October 23, 2026 at RAF 14.

Tsarukyan is scheduled to face Neiman Gracie on November 14, 2026 at RAF Abu Dhabi.

Tsarukyan is also scheduled to face former UFC Lightweight Champion Anthony Pettis in the main event on November 28, 2026 at RAF 15.

== Fighting style ==
Tsarukyan has been described as a pressure-oriented fighter who combines wrestling with close-range striking. The same source wrote that he often works at short range and uses forward pressure to steer opponents toward the fence to set up takedowns, and reported that he does not hold a Brazilian jiu-jitsu belt rank.

== Personal life ==
Tsarukyan is an Armenian Apostolic Orthodox Christian. Raised in an Armenian household, Tsarukyan frequently carries the Armenian flag into the Octagon to bring international attention to his heritage. He has often emphasized a strong identification with his roots, noting that he is motivated by the support of Armenians worldwide.

Outside of his cultural heritage, Tsarukyan has discussed his training preferences and lifestyle choices; in an interview he stated that he prefers training in the United States over Russia, citing the environment and conditions as more conducive to focused preparation.

Tsarukyan is married. In early 2020, his wife gave birth to their first child, a daughter; their second, also a daughter, was born in 2022.

As of 2025, he is a brand ambassador through a multi-year branding deal between the UFC and Spribe.

Tsarukyan's longtime nickname "Ahalkalakets" referenced Akhalkalaki, the Georgian town with a large Armenian population where he was born. In September 2026 at UFC 331, Tsarukyan debuted his "Batman" nickname. The new moniker had gained popularity among fans and commentators who connected his fighting skills to a wealthy, luxury-heavy lifestyle reminiscent of Bruce Wayne, who is Batman's everyday persona when he's not fighting crime.

== Championships and accomplishments ==
=== Mixed martial arts ===
- Ultimate Fighting Championship
  - Fight of the Night (Two times) vs. Islam Makhachev and Mateusz Gamrot
  - Performance of the Night (Five times) vs. Christos Giagos, Joel Álvarez, Beneil Dariush, Dan Hooker and Maurício Ruffy
  - UFC.com Awards
    - 2022: Ranked #9 Fight of the Year vs. Mateusz Gamrot
- MMA Fighting
  - 2022 Third Team MMA All-Star

=== Submission grappling ===
- Absolute Championship Akhmat
  - ACBJJ "All-Star Title" (one time)

=== Freestyle wrestling ===
- Real American Freestyle
  - RAF Middleweight Crossover Championship (One time, current)
  - Match of the Night (One time) vs. Colby Covington

== Mixed martial arts record ==
Professional record breakdown
27 matches	24 wins	3 losses
By knockout	10	1
By submission	6	0
By decision	8	2

Res.	Record	Opponent	Method	Event	Date	Round	Time	Location	Notes
Win	24–3	Maurício Ruffy	KO (elbow)	UFC 331	September 19, 2026	1	4:56	Los Angeles, California, United States	Performance of the Night.
Win	23–3	Dan Hooker	Submission (arm-triangle choke)	UFC Fight Night: Tsarukyan vs. Hooker	November 22, 2025	2	3:34	Al Rayyan, Qatar	Performance of the Night.
Win	22–3	Charles Oliveira	Decision (split)	UFC 300	April 13, 2024	3	5:00	Las Vegas, Nevada, United States	UFC Lightweight title eliminator.
Win	21–3	Beneil Dariush	KO (knee and punches)	UFC on ESPN: Dariush vs. Tsarukyan	December 2, 2023	1	1:04	Austin, Texas, United States	Performance of the Night.
Win	20–3	Joaquim Silva	TKO (punches)	UFC on ESPN: Vettori vs. Cannonier	June 17, 2023	3	3:25	Las Vegas, Nevada, United States	
Win	19–3	Damir Ismagulov	Decision (unanimous)	UFC Fight Night: Cannonier vs. Strickland	December 17, 2022	3	5:00	Las Vegas, Nevada, United States	
Loss	18–3	Mateusz Gamrot	Decision (unanimous)	UFC on ESPN: Tsarukyan vs. Gamrot	June 25, 2022	5	5:00	Las Vegas, Nevada, United States	Fight of the Night.
Win	18–2	Joel Álvarez	TKO (punches)	UFC Fight Night: Makhachev vs. Green	February 26, 2022	2	1:57	Las Vegas, Nevada, United States	Performance of the Night.
Win	17–2	Christos Giagos	TKO (punches)	UFC Fight Night: Smith vs. Spann	September 18, 2021	1	2:09	Las Vegas, Nevada, United States	Performance of the Night.
Win	16–2	Matt Frevola	Decision (unanimous)	UFC 257	January 24, 2021	3	5:00	Abu Dhabi, United Arab Emirates	Catchweight (157 lb) bout; Tsarukyan missed weight.
Win	15–2	Davi Ramos	Decision (unanimous)	UFC Fight Night: Figueiredo vs. Benavidez 2	July 18, 2020	3	5:00	Abu Dhabi, United Arab Emirates	
Win	14–2	Olivier Aubin-Mercier	Decision (unanimous)	UFC 240	July 27, 2019	3	5:00	Edmonton, Alberta, Canada	
Loss	13–2	Islam Makhachev	Decision (unanimous)	UFC Fight Night: Overeem vs. Oleinik	April 20, 2019	3	5:00	Saint Petersburg, Russia	Fight of the Night.
Win	13–1	Felipe Olivieri	KO (head kick)	League S-70: Plotforma Cup 2018	August 22, 2018	3	1:25	Sochi, Russia	
Win	12–1	Júnior Assunção	Decision (unanimous)	Modern Fighting Pankration 220	May 26, 2018	3	5:00	Khabarovsk, Russia	Defended the FEMFP Lightweight Championship.
Win	11–1	Wu Haotian	TKO (spinning back kick to the body and punches)	Gods of War World MMA Championship	March 24, 2018	3	0:31	Beijing, China	
Win	10–1	Takenori Sato	Decision (unanimous)	Modern Fighting Pankration 214	December 2, 2017	3	5:00	Khabarovsk, Russia	Won the FEMFP Lightweight Championship.
Win	9–1	Kim Kyung-pyo	Decision (unanimous)	Road FC 43	October 28, 2017	3	5:00	Seoul, South Korea	
Win	8–1	Márcio Breno	Submission (rear-naked choke)	League S-70: Plotforma Cup 2017	August 8, 2017	1	2:54	Sochi, Russia	Return to Lightweight.
Win	7–1	Nizamuddin Ramazanov	Submission (rear-naked choke)	Modern Fighting Pankration 209	May 13, 2017	1	2:27	Khabarovsk, Russia	Featherweight debut.
Win	6–1	Gustavo Wurlitzer	Submission (rear-naked choke)	Octagon Fighting Sensation 11	March 4, 2017	1	3:22	Moscow, Russia	
Win	5–1	Alexander Belikh	Submission (guillotine choke)	Modern Fighting Pankration: Eastern Rubicon 2	December 10, 2016	1	2:51	Khabarovsk, Russia	
Win	4–1	Dmitriy Shkrabiy	TKO (punches)	Modern Fighting Pankration 204	November 5, 2016	1	2:21	Vladivostok, Russia	
Win	3–1	Alexander Merezhko	Submission (anaconda choke)	Modern Fighting Pankration: Governor's Pankration Cup 2016	October 21, 2016	2	1:28	Petropavlovsk-Kamchatsky, Russia	
Win	2–1	Ali Khaibulaev	KO (punch)	Modern Fighting Pankration: Cup of Administration in Modern Pankration	May 6, 2016	1	0:33	Petropavlovsk-Kamchatsky, Russia	
Loss	1–1	Alexander Belikh	KO (punch)	Modern Fighting Pankration: Eastern Rubicon	December 12, 2015	1	0:30	Khabarovsk, Russia	
Win	1–0	Shamil Olokhanov	TKO (punches)	Modern Fighting Pankration: Assault Nights of Spassk 2015	September 25, 2015	1	2:47	Spassk-Dalny, Russia	Lightweight debut.

== Freestyle wrestling record ==
Freestyle matches
Res.	Record	Opponent	Score	Date	Event	Location
RAF Abu Dhabi at 182.5 lb catchweight limit.
Win	9–1	(Brazil) Neiman Gracie	TF 10–0	November 14, 2026	RAF Abu Dhabi: Chimaev vs. Weidman	Abu Dhabi, United Arab Emirates
RAF 14 for the inaugural RAF Middleweight Crossover Championship.
Win	8–1	(United States) Dillon Danis	TF 10–0	October 23, 2026	RAF 14: Tsarukyan vs. Danis	(United States) Las Vegas, Nevada
RAF 11 for the inaugural RAF Cruiserweight Crossover Championship.
Loss	7–1	(United States) Colby Covington	3–5	July 18, 2026	RAF 11: Tsarukyan vs. Covington	(United States) Milwaukee, Wisconsin
RAF Georgia at 185 lb middleweight limit.
Win	7–0	(Kazakhstan) Kuat Khamitov	TF 11–0	July 11, 2026	RAF Georgia: Dvalishvili vs. Cejudo	(Georgia (country)) Tbilisi, Georgia
RAF 10 at 175 lb middleweight limit.
Win	6–0	(United States) Tony Ferguson	TF 10–0	June 13, 2026	RAF 10: Chimaev vs. Danis	(United States) St. Louis, Missouri
RAF 09 at 175 lb middleweight limit.
Win	5–0	(United States) Keelon Jimison	TF 16–5	May 30, 2026	RAF 09: Steveson vs. Romanov	(United States) Arlington, Texas
RAF 08 at 175 lb middleweight limit.
Win	4–0	(United States) Urijah Faber	TF 13–1	April 18, 2026	RAF 08: Tsarukyan vs. Faber	(United States) Philadelphia, Pennsylvania
RAF 07 at 175 lb middleweight limit.
Win	3–0	(United States) Georgio Poullas	9–3	March 28, 2026	RAF 07: Tsarukyan vs. Poullas 2	(United States) Tampa, Florida
RAF 06 at 175 lb middleweight limit.
Win	2–0	(United States) Georgio Poullas	5–3	February 28, 2026	RAF 06: Cejudo vs. Faber	(United States) Tempe, Arizona
RAF 05 at 170 lb catchweight limit.
Win	1–0	(United States) Lance Palmer	TF 10–0	January 10, 2026	RAF 05: Covington vs. Rockhold	(United States) Sunrise, Florida

== Submission grappling record ==
6 Matches, 5 Wins, 0 Losses, 1 Draw
Win	6–0–1	(India) Ankit Baiyanpuria	Submission (armbar)	Hype FC: Armenia	August 1, 2026	Yerevan, Armenia
Win	5–0–1	(England) Muhammad Mokaev	Technical submission (rear-naked choke)	Hype FC: Brazil	March 11, 2026	Rio de Janeiro, Brazil
Draw	4–0–1	(Russia) Sharabutdin Magomedov	Draw	Hype FC: Akopyan vs. Oev	December 30, 2025	Yerevan, Armenia
Win	4–0	(Russia) Mehdi Baydulaev	Submission (rear-naked choke)	ACBJJ 20	December 17, 2025	Moscow, Russia
Win	3–0	(United States) Benson Henderson	Technical decision (arm-triangle choke)	ACBJJ 18	September 19, 2025	Moscow, Russia
Win	2–0	(Brazil) Patricky "Pitbull" Freire	Submission (rear-naked choke)	ADXC 10	May 31, 2025	Moscow, Russia
Win	1–0	(Russia) Makkasharip Zaynukov	Decision (unanimous)	Karate Combat 54	May 2, 2025	Dubai, United Arab Emirates
