= UFC Fight Night: Kape vs. Almabayev =

Mixed martial arts event in 2025

- The poster for UFC Fight Night: Kape vs. Almabayev
- Promotion: Ultimate Fighting Championship
- Date: March 1, 2025
- Venue: UFC Apex
- City: Enterprise, Nevada, United States
- Attendance: Not announced

Event chronology
UFC Fight Night: Cejudo vs. Song	UFC Fight Night: Kape vs. Almabayev	UFC 313: Pereira vs. Ankalaev

UFC Fight Night: Kape vs. Almabayev (also known as UFC Fight Night 253 and UFC Vegas 103 and UFC on ESPN+ 111) was a mixed martial arts event produced by the Ultimate Fighting Championship that took place on March 1, 2025, at the UFC Apex in Enterprise, Nevada, part of the Las Vegas Valley, United States.

== Background ==
A UFC Flyweight title eliminator between former LFA Flyweight Champion (also former title challenger) Brandon Royval and former RIZIN Bantamweight Champion Manel Kape was expected to headline the event. However, Royval withdrew due to multiple concussions. He was replaced by Asu Almabayev. Albamayev was originally expected to face former flyweight title challenger Steve Erceg at the event, but the latter was moved to headline UFC on ESPN: Moreno vs. Erceg and replaced by Allan Nascimento. Nascimento was in turn pulled from the event after the latest changes.

A middleweight bout between Cody Brundage and The Ultimate Fighter: Team Grasso vs. Team Shevchenko middleweight winner Ryan Loder was scheduled for this event. However, Loder withdrew from the fight for unknown reasons and was replaced by Julian Marquez.

A women's flyweight bout between Montana De La Rosa and Luana Carolina was scheduled for this event. However, the bout was scrapped as a result of Carolina's botched weight cut.

In addition, a bantamweight bout between Douglas Silva de Andrade and John Castañeda was scheduled for this event. However, despite having the bout changed to a 140 pound catchweight bout, the fight was cancelled as Silva de Andrade did not have medical clearance to compete.

At the weigh-ins, Lucas Almeida weighed in at 148 pounds, two pounds over the featherweight non-title fight limit. The bout proceeded at catchweight and Almeida was fined 20 percent of his purse which went to his opponent Danny Silva.

== Results ==
Main card (ESPN+)
Weight class				Method	Round	Time	Notes
Flyweight	Manel Kape	def.	Asu Almabayev	TKO (retirement)	3	2:16
Middleweight	Cody Brundage	def.	Julian Marquez	TKO (punches)	1	4:45
Lightweight	Nasrat Haqparast	def.	Esteban Ribovics	Decision (split) (29–28, 28–29, 29–28)	3	5:00
Featherweight	Hyder Amil	def.	William Gomis	Decision (split) (29–28, 28–29, 29–28)	3	5:00
Welterweight	Sam Patterson	def.	Danny Barlow	KO (punches)	1	3:10
Preliminary card (ESPN+)
Heavyweight	Mario Pinto	def.	Austen Lane	KO (punch)	2	0:39
Featherweight	Chepe Mariscal	def.	Ricardo Ramos	Decision (unanimous) (30–27, 30–27, 30–27)	3	5:00
Catchweight (148 lb)	Danny Silva	def.	Lucas Almeida	Decision (split) (29–28, 28–29, 29–28)	3	5:00
Women's Flyweight	JJ Aldrich	def.	Andrea Lee	Decision (unanimous) (30–27, 30–27, 29–28)	3	5:00
Flyweight	Ramazan Temirov	def.	Charles Johnson	Decision (unanimous) (29–28, 29–28, 29–28)	3	5:00

== Bonus awards ==
The following fighters received $50,000 bonuses.

- Fight of the Night: Nasrat Haqparast vs. Esteban Ribovics
- Performance of the Night: Manel Kape and Mário Pinto

== See also ==
- 2025 in UFC
- List of current UFC fighters
- List of UFC events
