= Austen Lane =

American football player and mixed martial artist (born 1987)

No. 92, 97
- Position: Defensive end

Personal information
- Born: November 9, 1987 (age 38); Evanston, Illinois, U.S.
- Listed height: 6 ft 6 in (1.98 m)
- Listed weight: 265 lb (120 kg)

Career information
- High school: Iola-Scandinavia (WI)
- College: Murray State
- NFL draft: 2010: 5th round, 153rd overall pick

Career history
- Jacksonville Jaguars (2010–2012); Kansas City Chiefs (2013)*; Detroit Lions (2013); Chicago Bears (2014)
- * Offseason or practice squad member only

Awards and highlights
- OVC Defensive Player of the Year (2009); First-team All-American (2009); Third-team All-American (2008); 2× First-team All-OVC (2008, 2009)

Career NFL statistics
- Total tackles: 66
- Sacks: 3
- Forced fumbles: 1
- Stats at Pro Football Reference

Austen Douglas Lane (born November 9, 1987) is a retired American mixed martial artist and former professional football defensive end who last competed in the light heavyweight division of the Ultimate Fighting Championship (UFC). He was selected by the Jacksonville Jaguars in the fifth round of the 2010 NFL draft. He played college football for the Murray State Racers. He was also a member of the Kansas City Chiefs, Detroit Lions, and Chicago Bears.

== Early life ==
Lane grew up in Iola, Wisconsin.

Lane made 14.5 sacks on defense and caught 31 passes for 717 yards and 13 touchdowns on offense his senior year at Iola-Scandinavia High School. He earned All-conference and All-region honors for defense and offense and was selected All-state as a defensive end and honorable mention All-state as a wide receiver. Additionally, he had five blocked punts, 77 solo tackles, 61 assisted tackles and four fumble recoveries his senior year. He also earned two letters as a member of the Thunderbirds' basketball team and was named Second-team All-conference in 2004–05.

== College career ==
Lane started 40 of 43 games at Murray State of the Football Championship Subdivision. He holds school records with 29 sacks and 55 tackles for loss. Following his senior year, he was named as a finalist for the Buck Buchanan Award, given to the top defensive player in FCS football. He was named as a FCS first-team All-American by the Associated Press and was selected as the Ohio Valley Conference Defensive Player of the Year.

In 2009 Lane was second in the FCS with 11.0 sacks and third in the FCS with 19.5 tackles-for-loss after leading the OVC in sacks and TFL. He also ended the year with intercepting a pass and returning it 21 yards for a touchdown in a victory over Austin Peay. For the season in 11 games, he had 64 total tackles, 32 solo stops, 19.5 tackles for loss, 11 sacks, 1 interception for 21 yards and 1 touchdown, 3 forced fumbles, 1 fumble recovery, 8 quarterback hurries, 2 pass breakups.

The previous season he played in all 12 games and recorded 63 tackles, ranked second in the country with 22 tackles-for-loss and set MSU single-season record with 12 sacks. In 2007 Lane started 10 games at defensive end and led all defensive linemen with 48 stops, including 28 solo stops. In 2006 as a true freshman he played in 10 games, making 34 tackles, including 11 solo stops. He also had 3.5 tackles for a loss, finished with 2.5 sacks and had one pass break-up and blocked two kicks.

== Professional career ==
=== Pre-draft ===
Pre-draft measurables
Height	Weight	Arm length	Hand span	40-yard dash	10-yard split	20-yard split	20-yard shuttle	Three-cone drill	Vertical jump	Broad jump	Bench press
6 ft 5 3/4 in (1.97 m)	276 lb (125 kg)	33 3/8 in (0.85 m)	10 1/8 in (0.26 m)	4.58 s	1.51 s	2.61 s	4.07 s	6.70 s	35 in (0.89 m)	10 ft 5 in (3.18 m)	24 reps
All values from NFL Combine/Murray State Pro Day.

Following his senior season at Murray State, Lane was invited to participate in the 2010 Senior Bowl as a member of the North roster. He scored a touchdown off a fumble recovery in the second quarter and the North squad went on to win the game over the South 31–13.

Lane was projected to be drafted in the third round of the 2010 NFL draft by NFLDraftScout.com.

=== Jacksonville Jaguars ===
Lane was selected by the Jacksonville Jaguars in the fifth round (153rd overall) in the 2010 NFL draft. He was reunited with his college coach Matt Griffin, who had previously been hired by the Jaguars as an offensive assistant. Lane was signed to a contract on July 14, 2010. The deal was for four-years and $1.974 million, including a $184,190 signing bonus.

He was released on June 13, 2013. He wrote about the experience on Sports Illustrated's website.

=== Kansas City Chiefs ===
He was claimed off waivers by the Kansas City Chiefs on June 14, 2013.

=== Detroit Lions ===
Lane was signed by the Detroit Lions on November 5, 2013, but was cut on November 27.

=== Chicago Bears ===
Lane was signed by the Chicago Bears on February 17, 2014, but was released on August 30. He re-signed in December 2014.

=== Retirement ===
On August 3, 2015, Lane announced his retirement.

== Mixed martial arts career ==
Austen Lane
- Height: 6 ft 6 in (198 cm)
- Weight: 245 lb (111 kg; 17 st 7 lb)
- Division: Heavyweight
- Fighting out of: Jacksonville, Florida, United States
- Team: Bulldog Boxing, 10th Planet Jacksonville
- Rank: Purple belt in Brazilian Jiu-Jitsu
- Years active: 2017–2026

Mixed martial arts record
- Total: 21
- Wins: 13
- By knockout: 11
- By submission: 1
- By decision: 1
- Losses: 7
- By knockout: 6
- By submission: 1
- No contests: 1

Amateur record
- Total: 5
- Wins: 5
- By knockout: 5

Other information
- Mixed martial arts record from Sherdog

=== Amateur career ===
In November 2015, Lane made his amateur MMA debut, in which he defeated Micah Cross by knockout in the first round. Over the next year, Lane increased his amateur MMA record to 5 wins against no losses with all of his wins coming via knockout.

=== Professional career ===
Lane made his professional MMA debut in April 2017. He won his debut via knockout in the first round. Over the following year and into 2018, Lane fought three more times and improved his professional MMA record to 4 wins against no losses with again all of his wins coming via knockout.

In April 2018, it was announced that Lane would face fellow former NFL defensive end Greg Hardy at Dana White's Contender Series 9 on June 12. He lost the fight via knockout in the first round.

Lane returned to the regional MMA circuit to gain more experience, amassing a record of 7 wins and 2 losses over the next four years. This earned him a second shot on Dana White's Contender Series in 2022. He faced Richard Jacobi on September 20, 2022. He won the fight via TKO in the first round and was awarded a UFC contract.

=== Ultimate Fighting Championship ===
Lane was scheduled to face Junior Tafa on February 11, 2023 at UFC 284. However, he withdrew from the bout due to undisclosed reasons.

Lane faced Justin Tafa on June 24, 2023 at UFC on ABC 5. Less than thirty seconds into the bout, Lane eyepoked Tafa who was unable to continue, resulting in a no contest. The pair had a rematch on September 10, 2023 at UFC 293. Lane lost the fight via knockout in round one.

Lane faced Jhonata Diniz on April 27, 2024, at UFC on ESPN 55. He lost the fight by knockout in the second round.

Lane faced Robelis Despaigne on October 19, 2024 at UFC Fight Night 245. He won the fight by unanimous decision.

Lane faced promotional newcomer Mário Pinto on March 1, 2025 at UFC Fight Night 253. He lost the fight by knockout in the second round.

Lane faced Vitor Petrino on July 12, 2025, at UFC on ESPN 70. He lost the fight via a rear-naked choke submission in the first round.

Lane faced Iwo Baraniewski on March 21, 2026, at UFC Fight Night 270, in his light heavyweight debut. He lost the fight by knockout early in the first round.

On May 26, 2026, it was reported that Lane retired from MMA and was subsequently removed from the UFC roster.

== Personal life ==
In 2011, Lane was featured on the cover of Eastbay, the popular sporting goods catalog.

Lane wrote some columns for Monday Morning Quarterback on the website of Sports Illustrated.

== Championships and accomplishments ==
- Fury Fighting Championship
  - FFC Heavyweight Championship (One time)
- Combat Night
  - CN Heavyweight Championship (One time)
- Warfare MMA
  - Warfare FC Heavyweight Championship (One time)

== Mixed martial arts record ==
Professional record breakdown
22 matches	13 wins	8 losses
By knockout	11	7
By submission	1	1
By decision	1	0
No contests	1	

Res.	Record	Opponent	Method	Event	Date	Round	Time	Location	Notes
Loss	13–8 (1)	Iwo Baraniewski	TKO (punches)	UFC Fight Night: Evloev vs. Murphy	March 21, 2026	1	0:28	London, England	Light Heavyweight debut.
Loss	13–7 (1)	Vitor Petrino	Submission (rear-naked choke)	UFC on ESPN: Lewis vs. Teixeira	July 12, 2025	1	4:16	Nashville, Tennessee, United States	
Loss	13–6 (1)	Mario Pinto	KO (punch)	UFC Fight Night: Kape vs. Almabayev	March 1, 2025	2	0:39	Las Vegas, Nevada, United States	
Win	13–5 (1)	Robelis Despaigne	Decision (unanimous)	UFC Fight Night: Hernandez vs. Pereira	October 19, 2024	3	5:00	Las Vegas, Nevada, United States	
Loss	12–5 (1)	Jhonata Diniz	KO (punches)	UFC on ESPN: Nicolau vs. Perez	April 27, 2024	2	2:12	Las Vegas, Nevada, United States	
Loss	12–4 (1)	Justin Tafa	KO (punches)	UFC 293	September 10, 2023	1	1:22	Sydney, Australia	
NC	12–3 (1)	Justin Tafa	NC (accidental eye poke)	UFC on ABC: Emmett vs. Topuria	June 24, 2023	1	0:29	Jacksonville, Florida, United States	Accidental eye poke rendered Tafa unable to continue.
Win	12–3	Richard Jacobi	TKO (punches)	Dana White's Contender Series 55	September 20, 2022	1	4:34	Las Vegas, Nevada, United States	
Win	11–3	Eric Lunsford	TKO (knee injury)	Fury FC 58	February 27, 2022	1	1:39	Dallas, Texas, United States	Defended the FFC Heavyweight Championship.
Win	10–3	Juan Adams	TKO (punches)	Fury FC 54	November 21, 2021	4	0:43	Houston, Texas, United States	Won the FFC Heavyweight Championship.
Win	9–3	Rashaun Jackson	KO (punch)	Combat Night: Clash of the Titans 5	July 24, 2021	1	0:31	Orlando, Florida, United States	Won the vacant CN Heavyweight Championship.
Win	8–3	Brad Taylor	Submission (rear-naked choke)	Combat Night Pro 20	March 13, 2021	1	2:35	Orlando, Florida, United States	
Win	7–3	Tebaris Gordon	TKO (punches)	Warfare MMA 19	September 12, 2020	1	2:22	North Charleston, South Carolina, United States	Won the Warfare FC Heavyweight Championship.
Loss	6–3	Vernon Lewis	TKO (punches)	LFA 83	March 6, 2020	1	4:10	Dallas, Texas, United States	
Win	6–2	Cameron Graham	TKO (punches)	Combat Night Pro 14	July 20, 2019	2	1:25	Tallahassee, Florida, United States	
Win	5–2	Brad Taylor	KO (punches)	Combat Night Pro 13	March 16, 2019	1	3:07	Pensacola, Florida, United States	
Loss	4–2	Frank Tate	TKO (punches)	Island Fights 50	September 29, 2018	1	2:41	Pensacola, Florida, United States	
Loss	4–1	Greg Hardy	TKO (punches)	Dana White's Contender Series 9	June 12, 2018	1	0:57	Las Vegas, Nevada, United States	
Win	4–0	Benjamin Rowland	TKO (doctor stoppage)	Warfare MMA 18	March 10, 2018	1	3:53	North Myrtle Beach, South Carolina, United States	
Win	3–0	Justin Thornton	TKO (punches)	Combat Night: Battle at the Beach 3	November 18, 2017	1	1:39	Jekyll Island, Georgia, United States	
Win	2–0	Johnathan Miller	KO (punch)	Combat Night Pro 3	July 29, 2017	1	0:20	Orlando, Florida, United States	
Win	1–0	John Darling	TKO (punches)	Combat Night Pro 2	April 1, 2017	1	0:14	Sarasota, Florida, United States	Heavyweight debut.
