= Jhonata Diniz =

Brazilian mixed martial arts fighter

- Born: Jhonata Wilhan Diniz; 23 June 1991 (age 35); Curitiba, Brazil
- Height: 6 ft 4 in (1.93 m)
- Weight: 258 lb (117 kg; 18 st 6 lb)
- Division: Heavyweight
- Reach: 79.5 in (202 cm)
- Style: Kickboxing, Muay Thai
- Stance: Orthodox
- Fighting out of: Curitiba, Brazil
- Team: Santa Fé Team
- Rank: Black belt in Muay Thai; Blue belt in Brazilian Jiu-Jitsu under Sérgio Moraes

Kickboxing record
- Total: 29
- Wins: 22
- By knockout: 15
- Losses: 7
- By knockout: 2

Mixed martial arts record
- Total: 12
- Wins: 9
- By knockout: 7
- By decision: 2
- Losses: 3
- By knockout: 3

Other information
- Mixed martial arts record from Sherdog

Jhonata Wilhan Diniz (born June 23, 1991) is a Brazilian mixed martial artist currently competing in the Heavyweight division of the Ultimate Fighting Championship (UFC). He is also a former kickboxer who competed for GLORY and SUPERKOMBAT Fighting Championship.

== Kickboxing and Muay Thai career ==
=== Early career ===
Jhonata Diniz defeated Jan Soukup by decision after Soukup survived knockdowns in rounds one and three at Ichigeki Brazil 2010 in São Paulo on July 31, 2010.

On September 3, 2011, Diniz won a 4-man muay thai rules tournament. He defeated Haime Morais in the semifinal and Saulo Cavalari in the final, both by unanimous decision.

=== GLORY ===
Diniz made his debut for the Glory promotion on October 10, 2012, at Glory 2: Brussels against Sebastian van Thielen. He won the fight by unanimous decision.

Diniz replaced Fabiano Cyclone to faced Daniel Ghiță in the first round of the 2012 Glory Heavyweight Grand Slam at Glory 4: Tokyo - 2012 Heavyweight Grand Slam in Saitama, Japan on 31 December 2012. He was defeated by unanimous decision after two, two-minute rounds due to the tournament's "best of three" format.

For his third fight with the promotion Diniz was defeated by Rico Verhoeven via unanimous decision at Glory 7: Milan in Milan, Italy on 20 April 2013.

Diniz faced Igor Jurković at Glory 12: New York on November 23, 2013. He won the fight by first-round TKO.

Diniz faced Hesdy Gerges at Glory 15: Istanbul in Turkey on April 12, 2014. He lost the fight via second-round TKO.

=== ACB Kickboxing ===
On October 16, 2015 Diniz defeated Valentin Slavikovski by knockout in the first round at ACB KB-3. For his second fight in ACB Kickboxing Diniz challenged for the Heavyweight title against Kirk Krouba at ACB KB 6: Battle in Brussels on June 5, 2016. He won the fight by technical knockout in the third round.

Jhonata Diniz faced Nicolas Wamba at Glory 42 Paris on June 10, 2017, in Paris, France. He was defeated by a unanimous decision.

On August 5, 2018, Diniz defeated Mikhail Tyuterev by knockout in the first round at ACB-KB 17 in Pskov, Russia.

Diniz was scheduled to defend his Absolute Championship Akhmat Heavyweight Kickboxing title against Tsotne Rogava on April 20, 2018, at ACB KB 15: Grand Prix Kitek. He lost by unanimous decision.

Diniz challenged Mladen Brestovac for his FFC Heavyweight title at FFC 31. He lost the fight by high kick knockout in the third round.

=== SUPERKOMBAT and Tatneft Cup ===
After a two-year absence from the sport Diniz made his return to competition on November 1, 2021, at Superkombat Universe where he defeated Asdren Gashi by technical knockout in the second round.

On September 28, 2021, Diniz took part in the 2021 Taneft Cup in the heavyweight division, in the quarterfinal he faced Maksim Bolotov. He won the fight by second-round knockout with a flying knee. Diniz faced Dmitriy Vasenev in the semifinal bout of the Tatneft Cup on December 13, 2021. He won the fight by extension round decision. Diniz advanced to the tournament finals, where the faced Valeriy Bizyaev. He won the fight by first-round knockout with a left hook to take the title.

== Mixed martial arts career ==
Diniz made his mixed martial arts debut at Spartacus MMA 5 on May 21, 2022. He defeated Rodrigo Dragão by technical knockout in the first round.

For his third mixed martial arts fight Diniz faced Guilherme Lazzarini at Imortal FC 11 in Curitiba, Brazil on November 11, 2022. He won by knockout in the first round in spectacular manner.

On March 19, 2023, Diniz faced Rodrigo Duarte at Imortal FC 12 in Curitiba, Brazil. He won the fight by technical knockout in the first round.

On September 12, 2023, Diniz faced Eduardo Neves at Dana White's Contender Series 62. He won the fight via TKO in the first round and was awarded a contract with the Ultimate Fighting Championship.

=== Ultimate Fighting Championship ===
Diniz faced Austen Lane on April 27, 2024, at UFC on ESPN 55. He won the fight by knockout in the second round. This fight earned him the Performance of the Night award.

Diniz faced Karl Williams on August 10, 2024 at UFC on ESPN 61. He won the fight by unanimous decision.

Diniz was scheduled to face former UFC Heavyweight Championship challenger Derrick Lewis on November 2, 2024 at UFC Fight Night 246. However, after the weigh-ins, Lewis was forced to withdraw from the fight due to non-weight cut related medical issues, causing the bout to be scrapped.

Diniz faced Marcin Tybura on November 16, 2024 at UFC 309. He lost the fight by technical knockout via doctor stoppage at the end of the second round as a result of ground elbows.

Diniz was scheduled to face Vitor Petrino on March 8, 2025, at UFC 313. However, Petrino was forced to withdraw from the fight due to lateral epicondylitis in both elbows, so the bout was removed from the card.

Diniz was scheduled to face Justin Tafa on June 28, 2025 at UFC 317. However, Tafa withdrew from the fight for unknown reasons and was replaced by promotional newcomer Alvin Hines. Diniz won the fight by unanimous decision.

Diniz faced Mario Pinto on October 11, 2025 at UFC Fight Night 261. He lost the fight by technical knockout in the second round.

Diniz was scheduled to face promotional newcomer José Luiz on June 20, 2026 at UFC Fight Night 279. However, Diniz had to withdraw for unknown reasons.

Diniz faced Tanner Boser on October 17, 2026, at UFC Fight Night 291. He lost the fight by technical knockout in the third round.

== Championships and accomplishments ==
=== Mixed martial arts ===
- Ultimate Fighting Championships
  - Performance of the Night (One time) vs. Austen Lane

=== Kickboxing ===
- Tatneft Cup
  - 2021 Tatneft Cup +80 kg Winner
- Absolute Championship Akhmat
  - ACB Kickboxing Heavyweight Champion

== Mixed martial arts record ==
Professional record breakdown
12 matches	9 wins	3 losses
By knockout	7	3
By decision	2	0

Res.	Record	Opponent	Method	Event	Date	Round	Time	Location	Notes
Loss	9–3	Tanner Boser	TKO (punches)	UFC Fight Night: Buckley vs. Malott	October 17, 2026	3	4:26	Edmonton, Alberta, Canada	
Loss	9–2	Mário Pinto	TKO (punches)	UFC Fight Night: Oliveira vs. Gamrot	October 11, 2025	2	4:10	Rio de Janeiro, Brazil	
Win	9–1	Alvin Hines	Decision (unanimous)	UFC 317	June 28, 2025	3	5:00	Las Vegas, Nevada, United States	
Loss	8–1	Marcin Tybura	TKO (doctor stoppage)	UFC 309	November 16, 2024	2	5:00	New York City, New York, United States	
Win	8–0	Karl Williams	Decision (unanimous)	UFC on ESPN: Tybura vs. Spivac 2	August 10, 2024	3	5:00	Las Vegas, Nevada, United States	
Win	7–0	Austen Lane	KO (punches)	UFC on ESPN: Nicolau vs. Perez	April 27, 2024	2	2:12	Las Vegas, Nevada, United States	Performance of the Night.
Win	6–0	Eduardo Neves	TKO (punches)	Dana White's Contender Series 62	September 12, 2023	1	3:15	Las Vegas, Nevada, United States	
Win	5–0	Rodrigo Duarte	TKO (retirement)	Imortal FC 12	March 19, 2023	1	4:17	Curitiba, Brazil	
Win	4–0	Carlos Nascimento	TKO (punches)	Spartacus MMA 26	January 28, 2023	1	3:51	São Paulo, Brazil	
Win	3–0	Guilherme Lazzarini	KO (punch)	Imortal FC 11	November 11, 2022	1	1:00	Curitiba, Brazil	
Win	2–0	Roberson Andrade	KO (punch)	Metanoia Fight Combat 7	September 10, 2022	1	1:32	Curitiba, Brazil	
Win	1–0	José Rodrigo Guelke	TKO (retirement)	Spartacus MMA 5	May 21, 2022	1	2:30	Curitiba, Brazil	Heavyweight debut.

== Kickboxing and Muay Thai record ==
Professional Muay Thai and kickboxing record
22 Wins (15 (T)KOs), 7 Losses
Date	Result	Opponent	Event	Location	Method	Round	Time
2022-11-04	Win	(Brazil) Abner Ferreira	WGP Kickboxing #67	Curitiba, Brazil	KO (Low kicks)	1	
2021-12-13	Win	(Russia) Valeriy Bizyaev	2021 Taneft Cup, Final	Kazan, Russia	KO (Left hook)	1	2:44
Wins 2021 Tatneft Cup +80kg Title.
2021-12-13	Win	(Russia) Dmitriy Vasenev	2021 Taneft Cup, Semi Final	Kazan, Russia	Ext.R Decision	4	3:00
2021-09-28	Win	(Moldova) Maksim Bolotov	2021 Taneft Cup, Quarter Final	Kazan, Russia	KO (Flying knee)	2	0:58
2021-11-01	Win	(Albania) Asdren Gashi	Superkombat Universe: Doumbé vs. Emiev	Dubai, UAE	TKO (Punches)	3	2:17
2019-09-13	Win	(Brazil) Lucas Monteiro	WGP Kickboxing #57	Curitiba, Brazil	Decision (Unanimous)	3	3:00
2018-10-12	Loss	(Croatia) Mladen Brestovac	FFC 31: Las Vegas	Las Vegas, Nevada, United States	KO (Left High Kick)	3	1:36
For the FFC Heavyweight Championship.
2018-08-05	Win	(Russia) Mikhail Tyuterev	ACB-KB 17	Pskov, Russia	TKO (Right cross)	1	3:00
2018-04-20	Loss	(Ukraine) Tsotne Rogava	ACB KB 15: Grand Prix Kitek	Moscow, Russia	Decision	5	3:00
Loses the ACB KB Heavyweight Title.
2017-07-01	Win	(Paraguay) Carlos Meza	WGP Kickboxing #38	Curitiba, Brazil	TKO (Punches)	1	2:30
2017-06-10	Loss	(France) Nicolas Wamba	Glory 42: Paris	Paris, France	Decision (unanimous)	3	3:00
2017-01-20	Win	(Slovakia) Tomáš Možný	Glory 37: Los Angeles	Los Angeles, California, United States	Decision (Unanimous)	3	3:00
2016-06-05	Win	(Belgium) Kirk Krouba	ACB KB 6: Battle in Brussels	Brussels, Belgium	TKO (Corner stoppage)	3	
Wins the inaugural ACB KB Heavyweight Title.
2016-04-23	Win	(Iran) Jafar Ahmedi	Champions Night	Istanbul, Turkey	TKO	2	
2015-10-16	Win	(Belarus) Valentin Slavikovski	ACB KB-3 Sibiu Grand Prix Final	Sibiu, Romania	KO (Left hook)	1	1:15
2015-09-27	Win	(Morocco) Hicham Achali	ACB-KB 2	Anapa, Russia	Decision (Unanimous)	3	3:00
2014-04-12	Loss	(Netherlands) Hesdy Gerges	Glory 15: Istanbul	Istanbul, Turkey	TKO (corner stoppage)	2	3:00
2013-11-23	Win	(Croatia) Igor Jurković	Glory 12: New York	New York City, USA	TKO (Right Hook)	1	1:59
2013-04-20	Loss	(Netherlands) Rico Verhoeven	Glory 7: Milan	Milan, Italy	Decision (Unanimous)	3	3:00
2012-12-31	Loss	(Romania) Daniel Ghiță	Glory 4: Tokyo - Heavyweight Grand Slam Tournament, First Round	Saitama, Japan	Decision (unanimous)	3	2:00
2012-10-06	Win	(Belgium) Sebastian van Thielen	Glory 2: Brussels	Brussels, Belgium	Decision (unanimous)	3	3:00
2011-09-03	Loss	(Brazil) Saulo Cavalari	VII Desafio Profissional de Muay Thai, final	São Paulo, Brazil	Decision (unanimous)	3	3:00
For the Mini GP Absolute title.
2011-09-03	Win	(Brazil) Haime Morais	VII Desafio Profissional de Muay Thai, semi final	São Paulo, Brazil	Decision (Unanimous)	3	3:00
2010-08-21	Win	(Brazil) Tiago Monaco	Torneio Estimulo Muay Thai VII	Brazil	KO (Punches)	1	
2010-07-31	Win	(Czech Republic) Jan Soukup	Ichigeki Brazil 2010	São Paulo, Brazil	Decision (unanimous)	3	3:00
2010-03-26	Win	(Brazil) Junior Alves	Campeonato Paranaense 2011	Brazil	KO (Punches)	1	
2009-11-20	Win	(Brazil) Gerverson Bergamo	Torneio Estimulo Muay Thai VI	Brazil	KO (Punches)	3	
Legend: Win Loss Draw/No contest Notes

== See also ==
- List of male kickboxers
- List of current UFC fighters
- List of male mixed martial artists
