= UFC Fight Night: Oliveira vs. Gamrot =

2025 mixed martial event in Rio de Janeiro, Brazil

- The poster for UFC Fight Night: Oliveira vs. Gamrot
- Promotion: Ultimate Fighting Championship
- Date: October 11, 2025
- Venue: Farmasi Arena
- City: Rio de Janeiro, Brazil
- Attendance: 16,297
- Total gate: Not announced

Event chronology
UFC 320: Ankalaev vs. Pereira 2	UFC Fight Night: Oliveira vs. Gamrot	UFC Fight Night: de Ridder vs. Allen

UFC Fight Night: Oliveira vs. Gamrot (also known as UFC Fight Night 261 and UFC on ESPN+ 119) was a mixed martial arts event produced by the Ultimate Fighting Championship that took place on October 11, 2025, at the Farmasi Arena, in Rio de Janeiro, Brazil.

== Background ==
This event marked the promotion's 13th visit to Rio de Janeiro, its first since UFC 301 in May 2024, and the first Fight Night hosted in the city since UFC Fight Night: Maia vs. LaFlare in May 2015.

A lightweight bout between former UFC Lightweight Champion Charles Oliveira and Rafael Fiziev was scheduled to headline the event. However, Fiziev withdrew from the bout due to a knee injury. He was replaced by former KSW Featherweight and Lightweight Champion Mateusz Gamrot.

A heavyweight bout between former LFA Light Heavyweight Champion Ryan Spann and Valter Walker was reportedly scheduled for this event. However, the bout did not materialize, and Walker was later expected to face The Ultimate Fighter: Team Peña vs. Team Nunes heavyweight winner Mohammed Usman. Usman subsequently withdrew for undisclosed reasons two days before the event and the pairing was scrapped.

A welterweight bout between Santiago Ponzinibbio and Vicente Luque was scheduled for the event. However, Ponzinibbio was forced to pull out from the event due to injury, and was replaced by Joel Álvarez.

A welterweight bout between former LFA Welterweight Champion Gabriel Bonfim and Randy Brown was scheduled for this event. However, the bout was moved to UFC Fight Night: Bonfim vs. Brown to serve as the main event.

At the weigh-ins, Saimon Oliveira weighed in at 144 pounds, eight pounds over the bantamweight non-title fight limit. The bout proceeded at catchweight and he was fined a percentage of his purse, which went to his opponent Luan Lacerda.

== Results ==
Main card (ESPN+)
Weight class				Method	Round	Time	Notes
Lightweight	Charles Oliveira	def.	Mateusz Gamrot	Submission (face crank)	2	2:48
Bantamweight	Deiveson Figueiredo	def.	Montel Jackson	Decision (split) (28–29, 29–28, 29–28)	3	5:00
Welterweight	Joel Álvarez	def.	Vicente Luque	Decision (unanimous) (30–26, 30–26, 30–26)	3	5:00
Heavyweight	Mario Pinto	def.	Jhonata Diniz	TKO (punches)	2	4:10
Featherweight	Kaan Ofli	def.	Ricardo Ramos	Submission (rear-naked choke)	1	3:02
Preliminary card (ESPN+)
Featherweight	Michael Aswell	def.	Lucas Almeida	TKO (punches and elbow)	1	1:42
Flyweight	Jafel Filho	def.	Clayton Carpenter	Submission (kimura)	1	4:42
Heavyweight	Vitor Petrino	def.	Thomas Petersen	KO (punches)	3	0:26
Women's Bantamweight	Beatriz Mesquita	def.	Irina Alekseeva	Submission (rear-naked choke)	2	2:14
Flyweight	Lucas Rocha	def.	Stewart Nicoll	Decision (unanimous) (30–27, 30–27, 30–27)	3	5:00
Women's Strawweight	Julia Polastri	def.	Karolina Kowalkiewicz	TKO (head kick and punches)	3	2:56
Catchweight (144 lb)	Luan Lacerda	def.	Saimon Oliveira	Submission (armbar)	2	3:55

== Bonus awards ==
The following fighters received $50,000 bonuses.

- Fight of the Night: No bonus awarded.
- Performance of the Night: Charles Oliveira, Vitor Petrino, Beatriz Mesquita, and Julia Polastri

== See also ==
- 2025 in UFC
- List of current UFC fighters
- List of UFC events
