= Mario Pinto =

Portuguese mixed martial artist (b. 1998)

Mário Pinto
- Born: Mário João Jauad Pinto; March 14, 1998 (age 28); Lisbon, Portugal
- Height: 6 ft 5 in (196 cm)
- Weight: 255 lb (116 kg)
- Division: Heavyweight
- Team: Fightzone London
- Years active: 2021–present

Mixed martial arts record
- Total: 13
- Wins: 13
- By knockout: 8
- By submission: 1
- By decision: 4
- Losses: 0

Other information
- Mixed martial arts record from Sherdog

Mário Pinto (born 14 March 1998) is a Portuguese professional mixed martial artist. He competes in the Heavyweight division of the Ultimate Fighting Championship (UFC). A professional competitor since October 2021, he previously competed for FightStar Championship and Levels Fight League. As of 12 September 2026, he is #10 in the Meta UFC heavyweight rankings.

== Early life and amateur career ==
Pinto was born in Portugal to parents from Guinea-Bissau before moving to Britain at a young age. He decided to pursue a career in mixed martial arts (MMA) as a teenager and later earned a degree in Sport and Exercise Science. Pinto took his first amateur bout in March 2018 and went on to compile an amateur MMA record of 5–1.

== Professional career ==
He made his professional debut in October 2021 at Contenders 31, where he faced Joffie Houlton and won the bout via first-round technical knockout. He then competed twice for FightStar Championship, defeating Berat Berisha by first-round TKO at FightStar Championship 21. Pinto followed this with his first professional submission victory at FightStar Championship 22, submitting Maxwell Djantou Nana via rear-naked choke.

In March 2023, he competed in the Levels Fight League (LFL) Heavyweight Grand Prix. Fighting three times in a single night, Pinto defeated Filip Bradarić by knockout in the first round, advancing to the semi-finals where he earned a unanimous decision victory over Aladin Ben Halima after three rounds. In the final he faced Moreno Kacapor and won by unanimous decision, capturing the LFL Heavyweight Championship. Pinto later defended the title in October 2023 against Benjamin Šehić, winning by third-round TKO. His second and final defence came in February 2024 against Kasim Aras whom he defeated by unanimous decision.

Pinto competed on Dana White's Contender Series in October 2024, facing Lucas Triverio Camacho. He won the bout via first-round knockout, earning a contract with the UFC. He made his promotional debut in March 2025 at UFC Fight Night 253, defeating Austen Lane by second-round knockout. This fight earned him a Performance of the Night award. Pinto returned in October 2025 at UFC Fight Night 261 against Jhonata Diniz. He won the fight by second-round TKO.

Pinto was scheduled to face Mick Parkin at UFC Fight Night 270 on 21 March 2026. However, the bout was cancelled and Pinto was instead matched against Felipe Franco. Pinto won by unanimous decision.

Pinto faced Ryan Spann at UFC Fight Night 287 on 5 September 2026. He won the fight by technical knockout in the second round. This fight earned him a $100,000 Performance of the Night award.

Pinto is scheduled to face Serghei Spivac on 5 December 2026 at UFC Fight Night 295.

== Championships and accomplishments ==
=== Mixed martial arts ===
- Ultimate Fighting Championship
  - Performance of the Night (Two times) vs. Austen Lane and Ryan Spann
- Levels Fight League
  - LFL Heavyweight Championship (One time)
    - Two successful title defenses
  - LFL Heavyweight Grand Prix winner

== Mixed martial arts record ==
Professional record breakdown
13 matches	13 wins	0 losses
By knockout	8	0
By submission	1	0
By decision	4	0

Res.	Record	Opponent	Method	Event	Date	Round	Time	Location	Notes
Win	13–0	Ryan Spann	TKO (punches)	UFC Fight Night: Hooker vs. Parnasse	September 5, 2026	2	0:55	Paris, France	Performance of the Night.
Win	12–0	Felipe Franco	Decision (unanimous)	UFC Fight Night: Evloev vs. Murphy	March 21, 2026	3	5:00	London, England	
Win	11–0	Jhonata Diniz	TKO (punches)	UFC Fight Night: Oliveira vs. Gamrot	October 11, 2025	2	4:10	Rio de Janeiro, Brazil	
Win	10–0	Austen Lane	KO (punch)	UFC Fight Night: Kape vs. Almabayev	March 1, 2025	2	0:39	Las Vegas, Nevada, United States	Performance of the Night.
Win	9–0	Lucas Triverio Camacho	KO (punches)	Dana White's Contender Series 75	October 8, 2024	1	1:43	Las Vegas, Nevada, United States	
Win	8–0	Kasim Aras	Decision (unanimous)	Levels Fight League 11	February 18, 2024	5	5:00	Amsterdam, Netherlands	Defended the LFL Heavyweight Championship.
Win	7–0	Benjamin Sehic	TKO (punches)	Levels Fight League 10	October 29, 2023	3	1:18	Amsterdam, Netherlands	Defended the LFL Heavyweight Championship.
Win	6–0	Moreno Kacapor	Decision (unanimous)	Levels Fight League: Heavyweight Grand Prix	March 11, 2023	3	3:00	Amsterdam, Netherlands	Won the LFL Heavyweight Grand Prix and the inaugural LFL Heavyweight Championship.
Win	5–0	Aladin Ben Halima	Decision (unanimous)	Levels Fight League: Heavyweight Grand Prix	March 11, 2023	3	2:00	Amsterdam, Netherlands	LFL Heavyweight Grand Prix Semifinal.
Win	4–0	Filip Bradaric	KO (punch)	Levels Fight League: Heavyweight Grand Prix	March 11, 2023	1	1:28	Amsterdam, Netherlands	LFL Heavyweight Grand Prix Quarterfinal.
Win	3–0	Maxwell Djantou Nana	Submission (rear-naked choke)	FightStar Championship 22	July 15, 2022	1	N/A	London, England	
Win	2–0	Besart Berisha	TKO (punches)	FightStar Championship 21	March 19, 2022	1	1:07	London, England	
Win	1–0	Joffie Houlton	TKO (punches)	Contenders Norwich 31	October 2, 2021	1	N/A	London, England	Heavyweight debut.

== See also ==
- List of current UFC fighters
- List of Dana White's Contender Series alumni
- List of male mixed martial artists
