= UFC on ABC: Whittaker vs. de Ridder =

Mixed martial arts event in 2025

- The poster for UFC on ABC: Whittaker vs. de Ridder
- Promotion: Ultimate Fighting Championship
- Date: July 26, 2025
- Venue: Etihad Arena
- City: Abu Dhabi, United Arab Emirates
- Attendance: Not announced

Event chronology
UFC 318: Holloway vs. Poirier 3	UFC on ABC: Whittaker vs. de Ridder	UFC on ESPN: Taira vs. Park

UFC on ABC: Whittaker vs. de Ridder (also known as UFC on ABC 9) was a mixed martial arts event produced by the Ultimate Fighting Championship that took place on July 26, 2025, at the Etihad Arena in Abu Dhabi, United Arab Emirates.

== Background ==
The event marked the promotion's 21st visit to Abu Dhabi and first since UFC 308 in October 2024.

A middleweight bout between former UFC Middleweight Champion (also The Ultimate Fighter: The Smashes welterweight winner) Robert Whittaker and former ONE Middleweight and Light Heavyweight World Champion Reinier de Ridder headlined the event.

A featherweight bout between Movsar Evloev and promotional newcomer Aaron Pico was scheduled to take place in a five round co-headliner. They were briefly expected to meet at UFC Fight Night: Burns vs. Morales in May, but it did not come to fruition. In turn, under two weeks prior to this event, Evloev had to withdraw due to an injury and the pairing was scrapped.

A women's strawweight bout between Amanda Ribas and Tabatha Ricci took place at this event. The bout was originally scheduled for UFC 318 one week before but was moved to this event for unknown reasons.

Asu Almabayev and Ramazan Temirov were expected to face each other in a flyweight bout on the preliminary card. However, Temirov pulled out due to failing a drug test in early July and was replaced by Jose Ochoa.

== Results ==
Main card (ABC / ESPN+)
Weight class				Method	Round	Time	Notes
Middleweight	Reinier de Ridder	def.	Robert Whittaker	Decision (split) (47–48, 48–47, 48–47)	5	5:00
Bantamweight	Petr Yan	def.	Marcus McGhee	Decision (unanimous) (29–28, 29–28, 29–28)	3	5:00
Middleweight	Sharabutdin Magomedov	def.	Marc-André Barriault	Decision (unanimous) (30–27, 30–27, 30–27)	3	5:00
Flyweight	Asu Almabayev	def.	José Ochoa	Decision (unanimous) (30–27, 30–27, 29–28)	3	5:00
Light Heavyweight	Bogdan Guskov	def.	Nikita Krylov	KO (punches)	1	4:18
Preliminary card (ESPN / ESPN+)
Bantamweight	Bryce Mitchell	def.	Said Nurmagomedov	Decision (unanimous) (29–28, 29–28, 29–28)	3	5:00
Welterweight	Muslim Salikhov	def.	Carlos Leal Miranda	KO (punch)	1	0:42
Bantamweight	Davey Grant	def.	Da'Mon Blackshear	Decision (unanimous) (29–28, 29–28, 29–28)	3	5:00
Women's Strawweight	Tabatha Ricci	def.	Amanda Ribas	TKO (elbow and punches)	2	2:59
Light Heavyweight	Billy Elekana	def.	İbo Aslan	Decision (unanimous) (30–27, 30–27, 29–28)	3	5:00
Featherweight	Steven Nguyen	def.	Mohammad Yahya	TKO (eye injury)	2	5:00
Heavyweight	Martin Buday	def.	Marcus Buchecha	Decision (unanimous) (29–28, 29–28, 29–28)	3	5:00

== Bonus awards ==
The following fighters received $50,000 bonuses.

- Fight of the Night: Sharabutdin Magomedov vs. Marc-André Barriault
- Performance of the Night: Muslim Salikhov and Steven Nguyen

== See also ==
- 2025 in UFC
- List of current UFC fighters
- List of UFC events
