= Iwo Baraniewski =

Polish mixed martial artist (born 1998)

- Born: November 20, 1998 (age 27); Warsaw, Poland
- Other names: Rudy
- Height: 6 ft 0 in (1.83 m)
- Weight: 205 lb (93 kg; 14 st 9 lb)
- Division: Light Heavyweight (2023–present)
- Reach: 73 in (185 cm)
- Stance: Orthodox
- Fighting out of: Warsaw, Poland
- Team: Aligatores Fight Club
- Rank: Black belt in Judo; Brown belt in Brazilian jiu-jitsu
- Years active: 2023–present

Mixed martial arts record
- Total: 10
- Wins: 9
- By knockout: 7
- By submission: 2
- Losses: 1
- By decision: 1

Other information
- Mixed martial arts record from Sherdog
Medal record
Representing Poland
Men's mixed martial arts
GAMMA World Championships
Gold medal – first place	2022 Amsterdam	‍–‍120 kg
GAMMA European Championships
Silver medal – second place	2021 Kyiv	‍–‍120 kg
Gold medal – first place	2022 Tbilisi	‍–‍120 kg
Gold medal – first place	2024 Vysoké Tatry	‍–‍120 kg
Men's submission wrestling
ADCC Polish Nationals
Bronze medal – third place	2019 Warsaw	‍–‍100 kg
Gold medal – first place	2020 Warsaw	‍–‍100 kg
- Judo career
- Country: Poland
- Weight class: ‍–‍100 kg

Judo achievements and titles
- World Champ.: R64 (2019)
- European Champ.: R32 (2019)
Medal record
Men's judo
Representing Poland
World Juniors Championships
Bronze medal – third place	2018 Nassau	‍–‍100 kg
Polish Youth Championships
Gold medal – first place	2020 Józefów	‍–‍100 kg

Profile at external judo databases
- IJF: 18096
- JudoInside.com: 95924

Iwo Baraniewski (born November 20, 1998) is a Polish professional mixed martial artist and former judoka. He currently competes in the Light Heavyweight division of the Ultimate Fighting Championship (UFC).

== Background ==
Baraniewski initially competed in judo. He started training at Nastula Club, before later switching to Aligatores Fight Club, which to this day is his gym. He competed in multiple International Judo Federation (IJF) tournaments, but did not place in the top 3.

Baraniewski's first podium place came at the 2018 World Judo Juniors Championships where he won the bronze medal after defeating Mathias Madsen. His next two medals were in submission wrestling, where he obtained a bronze and gold medal at the ADCC Polish Nationals in 2019 and 2020 respectively. Also in 2020, Baraniewski won the gold medal at the Polish Youth Judo Championships in Józefów after beating Eryk Ryciak in the final.

Transitioning to mixed martial arts, Baraniewski competed in the GAMMA European Championships in Kyiv in 2021, where he won the silver medal after losing to Stanislav Khmilkovsky in the finals. In 2022, Baraniewski competed in both the GAMMA European Championships and World Championships, where he won a gold medal in both after beating Arturs Skabarnieks and Giorgi Chochishvili respectively. In 2024, Baraniewski won another GAMMA European Championships gold medal after beating Cristian Constantinov in the finals.

== Mixed martial arts career ==
=== Babilon MMA ===
On September 30, 2023, under Babilon MMA, at Babilon MMA 39, Baraniewski won his professional MMA debut via armbar against Kamil Bartosiński in the first round. His last fight with the promotion came on March 14, 2025, when he faced Kamil Stachura. Baraniewski won the fight via first-round technical knockout, improving his record to 5–0.

=== Dana White's Contender Series ===
Baraniewski faced Mahamed Aly on the ninth season of Dana White's Contender Series on September 16, 2025, winning via knockout in the first 20 seconds and securing a contract with the Ultimate Fighting Championship (UFC).

=== Ultimate Fighting Championship ===
Baraniewski made his UFC debut against İbo Aslan on December 6, 2025, at UFC 323. He won the fight via first-round knockout. This fight earned him his first Performance of the Night award.

Baraniewski faced Austen Lane on March 21, 2026, at UFC Fight Night 270. He won the fight via knockout early into the first round. This fight earned him a $100,000 Performance of the Night award.

Baraniewski was scheduled to face Billy Elekana on June 6, 2026 at UFC Fight Night 278. However, Elekana withdrew for undisclosed reasons and was replaced by Junior Tafa. Baraniewski won the fight via technical knockout early into the first round. This fight earned him another $100,000 Performance of the Night award.

Baraniewski faced Alonzo Menifield on September 19, 2026 at UFC 331. He lost the fight by split decision, marking his first loss in mixed martial arts.

== Championships and accomplishments ==
=== Mixed martial arts ===
==== Professional ====
- Ultimate Fighting Championship
  - Performance of the Night (Three times) vs. İbo Aslan, Austen Lane and Junior Tafa
  - UFC.com Awards
    - 2025: Ranked #5 Fight of the Year vs. İbo Aslan
- MMA Fighting
  - 2025 Round of the Year Round 1 vs. İbo Aslan
  - 2025 Third Team MMA All-Star
- theScore
  - 2025 Round of the Year Round 1 vs. İbo Aslan at UFC 323

==== Amateur ====
- 2021: GAMMA European Championships - 2nd place in 120 kg category (Kyiv)
- 2022: GAMMA European Championships - 1st place in 120 kg category (Tbilisi)
- 2022: GAMMA World Championships - 1st place in 120 kg category (Amsterdam)
- 2024: GAMMA European Championships - 1st place in 120 kg category (Vysoké Tatry)

=== Judo ===
- 2018: World Judo Juniors Championships — 3rd place in ‍–‍100 kg category (Nassau)
- 2020: Polish Youth Judo Championships — 1st place in ‍–‍100 kg category (Józefów)

=== Grappling ===
- 2019 ADCC Polish Nationals - 3rd place in 100 kg category (Warsaw)
- 2020 ADCC Polish Nationals - 1st place in 100 kg category (Warsaw)

== Mixed martial arts record ==
Professional record breakdown
10 matches	9 wins	1 loss
By knockout	7	0
By submission	2	0
By decision	0	1

Res.	Record	Opponent	Method	Event	Date	Round	Time	Location	Notes
Loss	9–1	Alonzo Menifield	Decision (split)	UFC 331	September 19, 2026	3	5:00	Los Angeles, California, United States	
Win	9–0	Junior Tafa	TKO (leg kick and punches)	UFC Fight Night: Muhammad vs. Bonfim	June 6, 2026	1	1:25	Las Vegas, Nevada, United States	Performance of the Night.
Win	8–0	Austen Lane	TKO (punches)	UFC Fight Night: Evloev vs. Murphy	March 21, 2026	1	0:28	London, England	Performance of the Night.
Win	7–0	İbo Aslan	KO (punches)	UFC 323	December 6, 2025	1	1:29	Las Vegas, Nevada, United States	Performance of the Night.
Win	6–0	Mahamed Aly	KO (punches)	Dana White's Contender Series 82	September 16, 2025	1	0:20	Las Vegas, Nevada, United States	
Win	5–0	Kamil Stachura	TKO (elbows and punches)	Babilon MMA 51	March 14, 2025	1	3:02	Ciechanów, Poland	
Win	4–0	Sylwester Borys	TKO (punches)	Babilon MMA 49	November 22, 2024	1	3:01	Radom, Poland	
Win	3–0	Cemey dos Santos	TKO (punches)	Babilon MMA 47	September 28, 2024	1	1:11	Wieliczka, Poland	Catchweight (214 lb) bout.
Win	2–0	Miroslav Uchytil	Submission (armbar)	Babilon MMA 42	January 27, 2024	1	3:54	Żyrardów, Poland	
Win	1–0	Kamil Bartosiński	Submission (armbar)	Babilon MMA 39	September 30, 2023	1	3:17	Radom, Poland	Light Heavyweight debut.

== See also ==
- List of current UFC fighters
- List of Dana White's Contender Series alumni
- List of male mixed martial artists
