= İbo Aslan =

Turkish professional mixed martial artist

- Born: Halil İbrahim Demiraslan; 23 April 1996 (age 30); Altunhisar, Niğde, Turkey
- Other names: The Last Ottoman
- Nationality: Turkish
- Height: 6 ft 3 in (191 cm)
- Weight: 205 lb (93 kg; 14 st 9 lb)
- Division: Light heavyweight
- Reach: 77.5 in (197 cm)
- Fighting out of: Istanbul, Turkey
- Team: Gym 23

Mixed martial arts record
- Total: 18
- Wins: 14
- By knockout: 14
- Losses: 4
- By knockout: 1
- By submission: 2
- By decision: 1

Other information
- Mixed martial arts record from Sherdog

Halil İbrahim Demiraslan, also known as İbo Aslan (born 23 April 1996), is a Turkish professional mixed martial artist. He currently competes in the Light Heavyweight division of the Ultimate Fighting Championship (UFC).

== Background ==
Halil İbrahim Demiraslan was born on 23 April 1996 in Akçaören village of Altunhisar. When he was only seven years old, his family moved to Austria because of his father's job. At the age of thirteen, after attempting to play football and not enjoying it, he turned to martial arts. His interests led him to first take part in kickboxing, followed by wrestling and Brazilian jiu-jitsu.

== Mixed martial arts career ==
=== Dana White's Contender Series ===
Aslan faced Paulo Renato Jr. in season seven of Dana White's Contender Series on 15 August 2023. He won the fight via technical knockout in the first round, which earned Aslan a spot on the UFC roster.

=== Ultimate Fighting Championship ===
Aslan faced Anton Turkalj in a rematch on 30 March 2024 at UFC on ESPN 54. He won the fight via technical knockout in round three.

In his second fight, Aslan faced Rafael Cerqueira on 26 October 2024 at UFC 308. He won the fight via technical knockout in the first round.

Aslan faced Ion Cuțelaba on 22 February 2025 at UFC Fight Night 252. He lost the fight via an arm-triangle choke submission in the first round.

Aslan faced Billy Elekana on 26 July 2025 at UFC on ABC 9. He lost the fight by unanimous decision.

Aslan was scheduled to face Junior Tafa on 28 September 2025 at UFC Fight Night 260. However, the bout was canceled due to an injury with Tafa.

Aslan faced Iwo Baraniewski on 6 December 2025 at UFC 323. He lost the fight by first round knockout.

== Championships and accomplishments ==
- Ultimate Fighting Championship
  - Fight of the Night (One time) vs. Anton Turkalj
  - UFC.com Awards
    - 2025: Ranked #5 Fight of the Year vs. Iwo Baraniewski
- Austrian Fight Challenge
  - AFC Light Heavyweight Champion (One time)
- Vendetta Fight Night
  - VFN Light Heavyweight Champion (One time)
- MMA Fighting
  - 2025 Round of the Year Round 1 vs. Iwo Baraniewski
- theScore
  - 2025 Round of the Year Round 1 vs. Iwo Baraniewski at UFC 323

== Mixed martial arts record ==
Professional record breakdown
18 matches	14 wins	4 losses
By knockout	14	1
By submission	0	2
By decision	0	1

Res.	Record	Opponent	Method	Event	Date	Round	Time	Location	Notes
Loss	14–4	Iwo Baraniewski	KO (punches)	UFC 323	6 December 2025	1	1:29	Las Vegas, Nevada, United States	
Loss	14–3	Billy Elekana	Decision (unanimous)	UFC on ABC: Whittaker vs. de Ridder	26 July 2025	3	5:00	Abu Dhabi, United Arab Emirates	
Loss	14–2	Ion Cuțelaba	Submission (arm-triangle choke)	UFC Fight Night: Cejudo vs. Song	22 February 2025	1	2:51	Seattle, Washington, United States	
Win	14–1	Raffael Cerqueira	TKO (punches)	UFC 308	26 October 2024	1	0:51	Abu Dhabi, United Arab Emirates	
Win	13–1	Anton Turkalj	TKO (punch)	UFC on ESPN: Blanchfield vs. Fiorot	30 March 2024	3	1:32	Atlantic City, New Jersey, United States	Fight of the Night.
Win	12–1	Paulo Renato Jr.	TKO (punches)	Dana White's Contender Series 58	15 August 2023	1	2:22	Las Vegas, Nevada, United States	Return to Light Heavyweight.
Win	11–1	Giorgi Khubejashvili	TKO (leg kick and punches)	Vendetta Fight Nights 33	22 June 2023	1	1:30	Vienna, Austria	Heavyweight debut.
Win	10–1	Amilcar Alves	TKO (punches)	Sparta CF 1	2 April 2022	1	1:45	Vienna, Austria	
Win	9–1	Felix Polianidis	TKO (punches)	Tosan Fight Night 13	13 March 2022	1	0:20	Vienna, Austria	
Loss	8–1	Anton Turkalj	Submission (rear-naked choke)	Brave CF 40	24 August 2020	2	1:57	Stockholm, Sweden	
Win	8–0	Ivan Vičić	TKO (punches)	Vendetta Fight Nights 18	15 June 2019	1	0:00	Vienna, Austria	Won the vacant VFN Light Heavyweight Championship.
Win	7–0	Robert Valentin	TKO (punches)	Austrian Fight Challenge 8	1 December 2018	3	1:36	Vienna, Austria	Won the vacant AFC Light Heavyweight Championship.
Win	6–0	Bart Cillessen	TKO (punches)	Austrian Fight Challenge 7	16 June 2018	1	0:35	Vienna, Austria	
Win	5–0	Milan Stojadinovic	KO (punch)	Austrian Fight Challenge 6	9 December 2017	1	2:35	Vienna, Austria	
Win	4–0	Sasa Mihajlovic	TKO (punches)	Austrian Fight Challenge: New Talents 3	23 September 2017	1	N/A	Vienna, Austria	
Win	3–0	Igor Kantar	TKO (punches)	Austrian Fight Challenge: New Talents 2	10 June 2017	1	N/A	Vienna, Austria	
Win	2–0	Milan Bodonji	TKO (punches)	Austrian Fight Challenge 5	4 March 2017	1	N/A	Vienna, Austria	
Win	1–0	Mattia Calore	TKO (punches)	Austrian Fight Challenge: New Talents 1	15 October 2016	1	3:27	Vienna, Austria	Light Heavyweight debut.

== See also ==
- List of current UFC fighters
- List of male mixed martial artists
