= Ryan Spann =

American mixed martial artist (born 1991)

- Born: Ryan Jamari Spann; August 24, 1991 (age 35); Beaumont, Texas, U.S.
- Other names: Superman
- Height: 6 ft 5 in (1.96 m)
- Weight: 249 lb (113 kg; 17 st 11 lb)
- Division: Heavyweight; Light Heavyweight; Middleweight
- Reach: 79 in (201 cm)
- Fighting out of: Beaumont, Texas, U.S.
- Team: Fortis MMA
- Rank: Blue belt in Brazilian Jiu-Jitsu under Brian Hall
- Years active: 2013–present

Mixed martial arts record
- Total: 36
- Wins: 24
- By knockout: 7
- By submission: 14
- By decision: 3
- Losses: 12
- By knockout: 6
- By submission: 3
- By decision: 3

Other information
- Mixed martial arts record from Sherdog

Ryan Jamari Spann (born August 24, 1991) is an American mixed martial artist. He currently competes in the Heavyweight division of the Ultimate Fighting Championship (UFC). A professional since 2013, he has also fought for the Legacy Fighting Alliance, where he was the Light Heavyweight Champion.

== Background ==
Spann grew up in Westwood, Memphis, Tennessee, and began training martial arts in his early childhood.

== Mixed martial arts career ==
=== Early career ===
After compiling a 3–1 amateur record as a Middleweight and Welterweight, Spann started his professional career in 2013. He fought under various promotions, notably the regional Legacy Fighting Championship and Legacy Fighting Alliance where he was the Light Heavyweight Champion. He amassed a record of 13-5 prior participated in Dana White's Contender Series.

=== Dana White's Contender Series ===
Spann appeared in Dana White's Contender Series 3 on July 25, 2017, against Karl Roberson. He lost the fight by knockout due to elbows in round one.

Spann's second appearance in Dana White's Contender Series 10 came on June 19, 2018, against Emiliano Sordi. He won the fight via guillotine choke in round one and he was awarded a UFC contract.

=== Ultimate Fighting Championship ===
Spann made his UFC debut on September 22, 2018, at UFC Fight Night 137, facing Luis Henrique, replacing an injured Mark Godbeer. He won the fight via unanimous decision.

Spann's second UFC fight came on 11 May 2019, 2019 at UFC 237 against Antônio Rogério Nogueira. He won the fight via knockout in the first round.

Spann faced Devin Clark on October 12, 2019, at UFC Fight Night 161. He won the fight via submission in round two.

Spann was briefly linked to face Ovince Saint Preux on February 8, 2020, at UFC 247. However, promotion matchmakers elected to go in another direction and the pairing was scrapped from the event. Instead, Spann was booked against Paul Craig on March 21, 2020, at UFC Fight Night: Woodley vs. Edwards. However, the event was cancelled.

Spann faced Sam Alvey May 9, 2020, at UFC 249. Despite getting knocked down in the third round, Spann won the fight via split decision.

Spann was initially scheduled to face Johnny Walker at UFC Fight Night 176 on September 5, 2020. However, Walker tested positive for COVID-19 and the bout was postponed to September 19, 2020, at UFC Fight Night 178. Despite dropping Walker twice in the first round, Spann would go onto lose the fight via knockout.

Spann was expected to face Misha Cirkunov on December 19, 2020, at UFC Fight Night 183. However, Cirkunov pulled out in early December due to an injury. The fight was rescheduled to March 13, 2021, at UFC Fight Night 187. After initially knocking Cirkunov down during the first minute, Spann won the fight via technical knockout in round one. This win earned him the Performance of the Night award.

Spann faced Anthony Smith on September 18, 2021, at UFC Fight Night 192. He lost the fight via rear-naked choke submission in round one.

Spann was scheduled to face Ion Cuțelaba on February 26, 2022, at UFC Fight Night 202. However, Spann was pulled from the event due to injury and the bout was rescheduled for UFC on ESPN 36. He won the bout via guillotine choke in the first round. The win earned Spann his second Performance of the Night bonus award.

Spann faced Dominick Reyes on November 12, 2022, at UFC 281. At the weigh-ins, Spann weighed in at 206.6 pounds, six tenths of a pound over the light heavyweight non-title fight limit. The bout proceeded at a catchweight with Spann fined 20% of his purse, which went to his opponent Reyes. He won the fight via knockout in the first round.

Spann was scheduled to face Nikita Krylov on February 25, 2023, at UFC Fight Night 220. However, the day of the event, Krylov fell ill to a food-borne illness and the main event was cancelled and the pair was rescheduled to meet at UFC Fight Night: Yan vs. Dvalishvili two weeks later. He lost the fight via a triangle choke submission in the first round.

Spann faced Anthony Smith in a rematch on August 26, 2023, at UFC Fight Night 225. He lost the close bout via split decision. 9 out of 14 media outlets scored the bout for Spann.

Spann faced Bogdan Guskov on April 27, 2024, at UFC on ESPN 55 He lost the fight via technical knockout as a result of ground-and-pound punches.

Spann was scheduled to face Ovince Saint Preux on September 7, 2024 at UFC Fight Night 242. However, Saint Preux withdrew from the fight due to an illness and the bout was moved to October 5, 2024 at UFC 307 as a result. Spann won the fight via a guillotine choke submission in the first round. This fight earned him another Performance of the Night award.

Spann faced former LFA Heavyweight Champion Waldo Cortes-Acosta in a heavyweight bout on March 15, 2025 at UFC Fight Night 254. He lost the fight by knockout in the second round.

Spann faced Łukasz Brzeski on July 19, 2025 at UFC 318. He won the fight via a guillotine choke submission in the first round.

Spann was reportedly scheduled to face Valter Walker on October 11, 2025 at UFC Fight Night 261. However, the bout did not come to fruition and it was later reported that Walker would instead face Mohammed Usman, although that bout later did not materialize either.

Spann was scheduled to face Rizvan Kuniev on February 7, 2026 at UFC Fight Night 266. However, Spann withdrew for undisclosed reasons and was replaced by Jailton Almeida.

Spann faced Marcus Buchecha on April 25, 2026 at UFC Fight Night 274. He won the fight via knockout in round two. This win earned him the Performance of the Night award.

Spann faced Mario Pinto on September 5, 2026, at UFC Fight Night 287. He lost the fight by technical knockout in the second round.

Spann is scheduled to face Louie Sutherland on January 16, 2027 at UFC Fight Night 296.

== Championships and accomplishments ==
=== Mixed martial arts ===
- Ultimate Fighting Championship
  - Performance of the Night (Four times) vs. Misha Cirkunov, Ion Cuțelaba, Ovince Saint Preux and Marcus Buchecha
- Legacy Fighting Alliance
  - LFA Light Heavyweight Championship (One time) vs. Alex Nicholson
- Hero FC
  - Hero FC Middleweight Championship (One time; former)
- MMA Fighting
  - 2022 Second Team MMA All-Star

== Mixed martial arts record ==
Professional record breakdown
36 matches	24 wins	12 losses
By knockout	7	6
By submission	14	3
By decision	3	3

Res.	Record	Opponent	Method	Event	Date	Round	Time	Location	Notes
Loss	24–12	Mário Pinto	TKO (punches)	UFC Fight Night: Hooker vs. Parnasse	September 5, 2026	2	0:55	Paris, France	
Win	24–11	Marcus Buchecha	KO (punches)	UFC Fight Night: Sterling vs. Zalal	April 25, 2026	2	2:10	Las Vegas, Nevada, United States	Performance of the Night.
Win	23–11	Łukasz Brzeski	Submission (guillotine choke)	UFC 318	July 19, 2025	1	2:37	New Orleans, Louisiana, United States	
Loss	22–11	Waldo Cortes-Acosta	KO (punches)	UFC Fight Night: Vettori vs. Dolidze 2	March 15, 2025	2	4:48	Las Vegas, Nevada, United States	Heavyweight debut.
Win	22–10	Ovince Saint Preux	Submission (guillotine choke)	UFC 307	October 5, 2024	1	1:35	Salt Lake City, Utah, United States	Performance of the Night.
Loss	21–10	Bogdan Guskov	TKO (punches)	UFC on ESPN: Nicolau vs. Perez	April 27, 2024	2	3:16	Las Vegas, Nevada, United States	
Loss	21–9	Anthony Smith	Decision (split)	UFC Fight Night: Holloway vs. The Korean Zombie	August 26, 2023	3	5:00	Kallang, Singapore	
Loss	21–8	Nikita Krylov	Submission (triangle choke)	UFC Fight Night: Yan vs. Dvalishvili	March 11, 2023	1	3:38	Las Vegas, Nevada, United States	Catchweight (215 lb) bout.
Win	21–7	Dominick Reyes	KO (punches)	UFC 281	November 12, 2022	1	1:20	New York City, New York, United States	Catchweight (206.6 lb) bout; Spann missed weight.
Win	20–7	Ion Cuțelaba	Submission (guillotine choke)	UFC on ESPN: Błachowicz vs. Rakić	May 14, 2022	1	2:22	Las Vegas, Nevada, United States	Performance of the Night.
Loss	19–7	Anthony Smith	Submission (rear-naked choke)	UFC Fight Night: Smith vs. Spann	September 18, 2021	1	3:47	Las Vegas, Nevada, United States	
Win	19–6	Misha Cirkunov	TKO (punches)	UFC Fight Night: Edwards vs. Muhammad	March 13, 2021	1	1:11	Las Vegas, Nevada, United States	Performance of the Night.
Loss	18–6	Johnny Walker	KO (elbows and punches)	UFC Fight Night: Covington vs. Woodley	September 19, 2020	1	2:43	Las Vegas, Nevada, United States	
Win	18–5	Sam Alvey	Decision (split)	UFC 249	May 9, 2020	3	5:00	Jacksonville, Florida, United States	
Win	17–5	Devin Clark	Submission (guillotine choke)	UFC Fight Night: Joanna vs. Waterson	October 12, 2019	2	2:01	Tampa, Florida, United States	
Win	16–5	Antônio Rogério Nogueira	KO (punches)	UFC 237	May 11, 2019	1	2:07	Rio de Janeiro, Brazil	
Win	15–5	Luis Henrique	Decision (unanimous)	UFC Fight Night: Santos vs. Anders	September 22, 2018	3	5:00	São Paulo, Brazil	
Win	14–5	Emiliano Sordi	Submission (guillotine choke)	Dana White's Contender Series 10	June 19, 2018	1	0:26	Las Vegas, Nevada, United States	
Win	13–5	Alex Nicholson	KO (punches)	LFA 32	January 26, 2018	1	4:24	Lake Charles, Louisiana, United States	Won the inaugural LFA Light Heavyweight Championship.
Win	12–5	Myron Dennis	KO (punches)	LFA 27	November 10, 2017	1	3:08	Shawnee, Oklahoma, United States	
Win	11–5	LeMarcus Tucker	Submission (rear-naked choke)	LFA 23	September 22, 2017	1	2:55	Bossier City, Louisiana, United States	Return to Light Heavyweight.
Loss	10–5	Karl Roberson	KO (elbows)	Dana White's Contender Series 3	July 25, 2017	1	0:15	Las Vegas, Nevada, United States	
Win	10–4	Roman Pizzolato	Submission (guillotine choke)	World FC 72	May 13, 2017	1	0:20	Baton Rouge, Louisiana, United States	
Loss	9–4	Trevin Giles	Decision (split)	LFA 3	February 10, 2017	3	5:00	Lake Charles, Louisiana, United States	Return to Middleweight.
Loss	9–3	Robert Drysdale	Submission (rear-naked choke)	Legacy FC 58	July 22, 2016	2	2:58	Lake Charles, Louisiana, United States	For the vacant Legacy FC Light Heavyweight Championship.
Win	9–2	Aaron Davis	Submission (guillotine choke)	Legacy FC 52	Mar 25, 2016	1	2:53	Lake Charles, Louisiana, United States	Return to Light Heavyweight.
Loss	8–2	Leo Leite	Decision (unanimous)	Legacy FC 48	Nov 13, 2015	5	5:00	Lake Charles, Louisiana, United States	For the Legacy FC Middleweight Championship.
Win	8–1	Larry Crowe	KO (punches)	Legacy FC 42	June 26, 2015	1	0:08	Lake Charles, Louisiana, United States	
Win	7–1	Dwight Gipson	Submission (guillotine choke)	Vengeance Fighting Alliance: Round 5	May 9, 2015	1	4:39	Lake Charles, Louisiana, United States	
Win	6–1	Artenas Young	Submission (guillotine choke)	Fury FC 4	February 13, 2015	3	2:32	Humble, Texas, United States	
Loss	5–1	Brandon Farran	TKO (punches)	Hero FC: Best of the Best 3	September 12, 2014	1	0:21	Brownsville, Texas, United States	Lost the Hero FC Middleweight Championship.
Win	5–0	Randy McCarty	Decision (unanimous)	Hero FC: Best of the Best 1	February 1, 2014	3	5:00	Harlingen, Texas, United States	Won the Hero FC Middleweight Championship.
Win	4–0	Jhonoven Pati	Submission (guillotine choke)	Hero FC: Texas Pride	September 28, 2013	1	2:32	Beaumont, Texas, United States	
Win	3–0	Brandon Atkins	Submission (guillotine choke)	Hero FC: Pride of the Valley 2	June 21, 2013	1	0:44	Pharr, Texas, United States	Return to Middleweight.
Win	2–0	Steven Zamora	Submission (rear-naked choke)	El Orgullo del Valle	March 16, 2013	1	2:25	Pharr, Texas, United States	Light Heavyweight debut.
Win	1–0	Aaron Lebrun	Submission (rear-naked choke)	Vengeance Fighting Alliance: Round 1	February 16, 2013	1	N/A	Lake Charles, Louisiana, United States	Middleweight debut.

== See also ==
- List of current UFC fighters
- List of Dana White's Contender Series alumni
- List of male mixed martial artists
