= UFC 323 =

Mixed martial arts event in 2025

UFC 323: Dvalishvili vs. Yan 2
- The poster for UFC 323: Dvalishvili vs. Yan 2
- Promotion: Ultimate Fighting Championship
- Date: December 6, 2025
- Venue: T-Mobile Arena
- City: Paradise, Nevada, United States
- Attendance: 18,603
- Total gate: $4,738,495

Event chronology
UFC Fight Night: Tsarukyan vs. Hooker	UFC 323: Dvalishvili vs. Yan 2	UFC on ESPN: Royval vs. Kape

UFC 323: Dvalishvili vs. Yan 2 was a mixed martial arts event produced by the Ultimate Fighting Championship that took place on December 6, 2025, at the T-Mobile Arena in Paradise, Nevada, part of the Las Vegas Valley, United States.

== Background ==
This was the UFC's last pay-per-view (PPV) event before its new media deal with Paramount Skydance took effect in 2026, as the numbered events will instead be available to stream at no additional cost on Paramount+ in the U.S. starting next year. The PPV model has been a hallmark of the promotion since its inception in 1993 and has been especially emphasized during the organization's seven-year broadcast partnership with ESPN.

A UFC Bantamweight Championship bout between current champion Merab Dvalishvili and former champion Petr Yan headlined the event. With a win, Dvalishvili would become the first UFC champion in history to defend a title four times in the same calendar year. The pairing previously met in March 2023 at UFC Fight Night: Yan vs. Dvalishvili which Dvalishvili won by unanimous decision.

A UFC Flyweight Championship bout between current champion Alexandre Pantoja and Joshua Van served as the co-main event.

Mansur Abdul-Malik and Antonio Trócoli met in a middleweight bout at this event. The pairing was initially expected to take place at UFC Fight Night: Cejudo vs. Song in late February, but Trócoli withdrew due to undisclosed reasons.

A light heavyweight bout between former KSW and UFC Light Heavyweight Champion Jan Błachowicz and Bogdan Guskov was scheduled for UFC Fight Night: Tsarukyan vs. Hooker. However, the pairing was moved to this event for unknown reasons.

A lightweight bout between Terrance McKinney and Chris Duncan took place at the event. They were first scheduled to compete at UFC Fight Night: Yusuff vs. Barboza in October 2023, but Duncan had to withdraw due to visa issues.

A featherweight bout between Muhammad Naimov and The Ultimate Fighter: Team Grasso vs. Team Shevchenko featherweight winner Mairon Santos took place at this event. The bout was originally scheduled for UFC Fight Night: Tsarukyan vs. Hooker two weeks prior but was moved to this event for undisclosed reasons. At the weigh-ins, Santos weighed in at 147.5 pounds, 1.5 pounds over the featherweight non-title fight limit. The bout proceeded at catchweight and he was fined 20 percent of his purse, which went to Naimov.

Also at the weigh-ins, Brunno Ferreira weighed in at 189 pounds, 3 pounds over the middleweight non-title fight limit. His bout proceeded at catchweight and he was fined 20 percent of his purse which went to his opponent former UFC Middleweight Championship challenger Marvin Vettori.

== Results ==
Main card
Weight class				Method	Round	Time	Notes
Bantamweight	Petr Yan	def.	Merab Dvalishvili (c)	Decision (unanimous) (49–46, 49–46, 48–47)	5	5:00	(Note: For the UFC Bantamweight Championship.)
Flyweight	Joshua Van	def.	Alexandre Pantoja (c)	TKO (arm injury)	1	0:26	(Note: For the UFC Flyweight Championship.)
Flyweight	Tatsuro Taira	def.	Brandon Moreno	TKO (punches)	2	2:24
Bantamweight	Payton Talbott	def.	Henry Cejudo	Decision (unanimous) (30–27, 30–27, 30–27)	3	5:00
Light Heavyweight	Jan Błachowicz	vs.	Bogdan Guskov	Draw (majority) (29–28, 28–28, 28–28)	3	5:00
Preliminary card (ESPN2 / ESPN+ / Disney+ / FX)
Lightweight	Manuel Torres	def.	Grant Dawson	TKO (punches)	1	2:25
Lightweight	Chris Duncan	def.	Terrance McKinney	Submission (anaconda choke)	1	2:30
Women's Flyweight	Maycee Barber	def.	Karine Silva	Decision (unanimous) (30–27, 29–28, 29–28)	3	5:00
Lightweight	Farès Ziam	def.	Nazim Sadykhov	TKO (elbows and punches)	2	4:59
Early preliminary card (ESPN+ / Disney+ / FX)
Catchweight (189 lb)	Brunno Ferreira	def.	Marvin Vettori	Decision (unanimous) (29–28, 29–28, 29–28)	3	5:00
Lightweight	Jalin Turner	def.	Edson Barboza	TKO (punches)	1	2:24
Light Heavyweight	Iwo Baraniewski	def.	İbo Aslan	KO (punches)	1	1:29
Middleweight	Mansur Abdul-Malik	def.	Antonio Trócoli	Submission (guillotine choke)	1	1:09
Catchweight (147.5 lb)	Mairon Santos	def.	Muhammad Naimov	TKO (punches)	3	0:21

== Bonus awards ==
The following fighters received $50,000 bonuses.

- Fight of the Night: Petr Yan vs. Merab Dvalishvili
- Performance of the Night: Manuel Torres and Iwo Baraniewski

== See also ==
- 2025 in UFC
- List of current UFC fighters
- List of UFC events
