= Billy Elekana =

American mixed martial artist (born 1995)

- Born: Billy Joseph Elekana; May 28, 1995 (age 31); Victorville, California, U.S.
- Other names: Son of Susie
- Height: 6 ft 3 in (1.91 m)
- Weight: 205 lb (93 kg; 14 st 9 lb)
- Division: Middleweight (2021–2022); Light Heavyweight (2023–present)
- Reach: 77 in (196 cm)
- Style: Brazilian Jiu-jitsu
- Stance: Orthodox
- Fighting out of: Las Vegas, Nevada, U.S.
- Team: Uprising MMA Training Center
- Years active: 2021–present

Mixed martial arts record
- Total: 13
- Wins: 10
- By knockout: 3
- By submission: 3
- By decision: 4
- Losses: 3
- By submission: 1
- By decision: 2

Other information
- Mixed martial arts record from Sherdog

Billy Joseph Elekana (born May 28, 1995) is an American professional mixed martial artist. He currently competes in the Light Heavyweight division for the Ultimate Fighting Championship (UFC). He has previously competed on Professional Fighters League (PFL) and Legacy Fighting Alliance (LFA).

== Professional career ==
=== Early career ===
Elekana made his professional debut on May 14, 2021, against Ravon Baxter. Elekana won the fight via a second-round submission.

His next fight came on August 28, 2021, against Starling Simmons. Elekana won the fight via a first-round TKO, after his opponent suffered a leg injury.

=== Legacy Fighting Alliance ===
Elekana made his debut under Legacy Fighting Alliance (LFA) on December 10, 2021, against Jeff Nielsen. Elekana won the fight via a Unanimous Decision.

His next fight came on April 22, 2022, against Kohlman Scribner. Elekana won the fight via a first-round TKO.

His final fight with the federation came on July 29, 2022, against Daniel Compton. Elekana lost the fight via a split decision.

=== Professional Fighters League ===
Elekana made his debut under Professional Fighters League (PFL) on March 10, 2023, against Tristan Overvig at PFL Challenger Series 15 in his Light Heavyweight debut. Elekana won the fight via a Unanimous Decision.

His final fight with the federation came on August 4, 2023, against Chuck Campbell at PFL 7 (2023). Elekana won the fight via a Split Decision.

=== Lights Out Xtreme Fighting ===
Elekana made his debut under Lights Out Xtreme Fighting on July 27, 2024, against Jureall Simmons. Elekana won the fight via a first-round TKO.

=== Ultimate Fighting Championship ===
Elekana made his debut under Ultimate Fighting Championship (UFC) on January 18, 2025, against Bogdan Guskov at UFC 311. Elekana took the fight on one weeks notice, after Guskov's original opponent, Johnny Walker withdrew due to an injury. Elekana lost the fight via a second-round submission.

His next fight came on July 26, 2025, against İbo Aslan at UFC on ABC 9. Elekana won the fight via a Unanimous Decision.

His next fight came on November 1, 2025, against Kevin Christian at UFC Fight Night 263. Elekana won the fight via a first-round submission.

His next fight came on January 31, 2026, against Junior Tafa at UFC 325. Elekana won the fight via a second-round submission.

Elekana was scheduled to face Iwo Baraniewski on June 6, 2026, at UFC Fight Night 278. However, Elekana withdrew for undisclosed reasons and was replaced by Junior Tafa.

Elekana faced Lucas Fernando on November 7, 2026 at UFC Fight Night 293. He lost the fight by unanimous decision.

== Personal life ==
Elekana is of Samoan descent.

== Mixed martial arts record ==
Professional record breakdown
13 matches	10 wins	3 losses
By knockout	3	0
By submission	3	1
By decision	4	2

Res.	Record	Opponent	Method	Event	Date	Round	Time	Location	Notes
Loss	10–3	Lucas Fernando	Decision (unanimous)	UFC Fight Night: Cortes-Acosta vs. Walker	November 7, 2026	3	5:00	Las Vegas, Nevada, United States	
Win	10–2	Junior Tafa	Submission (rear-naked choke)	UFC 325	February 1, 2026	2	3:18	Sydney, Australia	
Win	9–2	Kevin Christian	Technical Submission (rear-naked choke)	UFC Fight Night: Garcia vs. Onama	November 1, 2025	1	3:33	Las Vegas, Nevada, United States	
Win	8–2	İbo Aslan	Decision (unanimous)	UFC on ABC: Whittaker vs. de Ridder	July 26, 2025	3	5:00	Abu Dhabi, United Arab Emirates	
Loss	7–2	Bogdan Guskov	Submission (guillotine choke)	UFC 311	January 18, 2025	2	3:33	Inglewood, California, United States	
Win	7–1	Jureall Simmons	TKO (head kick and punches)	Lights Out Xtreme Fighting 18	July 27, 2024	1	1:58	Long Beach, California, United States	
Win	6–1	Chuck Campbell	Decision (split)	PFL 7 (2023)	August 4, 2023	3	5:00	San Antonio, Texas, United States	
Win	5–1	Tristan Overvig	Decision (unanimous)	PFL Challenger Series 15	March 10, 2023	3	5:00	Orlando, Florida, United States	Light Heavyweight debut.
Loss	4–1	Daniel Compton	Decision (split)	LFA 137	July 29, 2022	3	5:00	Commerce, California, United States	
Win	4–0	Kohlman Scribner	TKO (head kick and punches)	LFA 130	April 22, 2022	1	3:02	New Town, North Dakota, United States	Catchweight (191.2 lb) bout; Elekana missed weight.
Win	3–0	Jeff Nielsen	Decision (unanimous)	LFA 120	December 10, 2021	3	5:00	Prior Lake, Minnesota, United States	
Win	2–0	Starling Simmons	TKO (leg injury)	Fierce FC 16	August 28, 2021	1	3:41	West Valley City, Utah, United States	
Win	1–0	Ravon Baxter	Submission (rear-naked choke)	Fierce FC 15	May 14, 2021	2	2:21	West Valley City, Utah, United States	Middleweight debut.

== See also ==
- List of current UFC fighters
- List of male mixed martial artists
