= Men's Low-Kick at WAKO World Championships 2007 Belgrade -91 kg =

The men's heavyweight (91 kg/200.2 lbs) Low-Kick category at the W.A.K.O. World Championships 2007 in Belgrade was the second heaviest of the male Low-Kick tournaments, involving twelve fighters from three continents (Europe, Asia and Africa). Each of the matches was three rounds of two minutes each and were fought under Low-Kick rules.

As there were too few fighters for a sixteen-man tournament, four of the competitors received byes through to the quarter-finals. The tournament gold medallist was Yauhen Anhalevich from Belarus who defeated final opponent the Croatian Igor Jurkovic by split decision. Defeated semi finalists Dmitriy Antonenko from Russia and Abdeslam Narjiss from Morocco took bronze.

== Results ==
1st round
(Poland) Tomasz Sarara	D(3:0)
(Iraq) Tafeeq Abd
(South Africa) Pete Motaung
(Croatia) Igor Jurković	KO
(Sweden) Mikael Bäckström	KO
(Chile) Christian Sonenserv
(Belarus) Yauhen Anhalevich	D(3:0)
(Bulgaria) Javor Marinchev

Quarter-finals
(Russia) Dmitriy Antonenko	D(3:0)
(Poland) Tomasz Sarara
(Italy) Umberto Lucci
(Croatia) Igor Jurković	D(3:0)
(Morocco) Abdeslam Narjiss	KO
(Sweden) Mikael Bäckström
(Belarus) Yauhen Anhalevich	D(3:0)
(Serbia) Dejan Milosavljevic

Semi-finals
(Russia) Dmitriy Antonenko
(Croatia) Igor Jurković	D(2:1)
(Morocco) Abdeslam Narjiss
(Belarus) Yauhen Anhalevich	D(3:0)

Final
(Croatia) Igor Jurković
(Belarus) Yauhen Anhalevich	D(2:1)

=== Key ===
Abbreviation	Meaning
D (3:0)	Decision (Unanimous)
D (2:1)	Decision (Split)
KO	Knockout

== See also ==
- List of WAKO Amateur World Championships
- List of WAKO Amateur European Championships
- List of male kickboxers
