= Junior Tafa =

New Zealand-born Australian mixed martial artist

- Born: Pascall Saumani Milo Jr. 21 September 1996 (age 30); Avondale, Auckland, New Zealand
- Nickname: The Juggernaut
- Nationality: Australian
- Height: 6 ft 3 in (191 cm)
- Weight: 249 lb (113 kg; 17 st 11 lb)
- Division: Light Heavyweight; Heavyweight
- Reach: 72 in (183 cm)
- Style: Boxing, Muay Thai
- Fighting out of: Brisbane, Queensland, Australia
- Team: Soma Fight Club
- Trainer: Mike Ikilei
- Years active: 2017–present

Professional boxing record
- Total: 2
- Wins: 1
- By knockout: 1
- Losses: 0
- Draws: 1

Kickboxing record
- Total: 28
- Wins: 23
- By knockout: 19
- Losses: 5
- By knockout: 2

Mixed martial arts record
- Total: 13
- Wins: 7
- By knockout: 7
- Losses: 6
- By knockout: 2
- By submission: 3
- By decision: 1

Other information
- Boxing record from BoxRec
- Mixed martial arts record from Sherdog

Pascall Saumani Milo Jr. (born 21 September 1996), known as Junior Tafa, is an Australian mixed martial artist, former professional kickboxer and boxer who currently competes in the Heavyweight and Light Heavyweight divisions of the Ultimate Fighting Championship (UFC).

== Background ==
Junior Tafa is the brother of former Ultimate Fighting Championship (UFC) heavyweight, Justin Tafa. He is of Samoan descent. He and his siblings were raised by a single mother, Pouli Amanda Tafa.

== Kickboxing career ==
Tafa participated in the 2018 Glory four man heavyweight tournament, alongside D'Angelo Marshall, Guto Inocente and Benjamin Adegbuyi. Tafa lost his semi-final fight to Inocente, but advanced due to Inocente suffering a cut during their bout. In the finals he met Benjamin Adegbuyi. Adegbuyi focused on landing leg kicks, and won the fight in the second round by TKO, after dropping Tafa three times.

On December 8, 2018, he entered the Glory 62 Heavyweight tournament He lost in the quarter final against Jamal Ben Saddik by TKO second round.

Tafa faced Cihad Kepenek at Glory 65: Utrecht on May 17, 2019. He lost the fight by unanimous decision.

== Mixed martial arts career ==
=== Early career ===
Debuting in July 2022, Tafa won his first two bouts on the Australian regional scene, both by TKO stoppages.

Tafa then faced Nicolas Djurdjević on November 26, 2022, at BRAVE CF 66. He won the bout via TKO stoppage two minutes into the bout.

Tafa faced Tsuyoshi Sudario on December 31, 2022, at Rizin 40. He won the fight by TKO via punches in the first round.

=== Ultimate Fighting Championship ===
In January 2023, it was announced that Tafa had signed with the Ultimate Fighting Championship. He was scheduled to make his promotional debut against Austen Lane at UFC 284 on February 11, 2023. However, Lane withdrew due to undisclosed reasons and was replaced by Waldo Cortes-Acosta. In turn, it was announced a few days later that Tafa withdrew due to injury and the bout was scrapped.

Tafa faced Mohammed Usman on April 22, 2023, at UFC Fight Night 222. Tafa lost bout via unanimous decision.

Tafa faced Parker Porter on August 26, 2023, at UFC Fight Night 225. He won the bout via knockout in the first round. This win which earned him a Performance of the Night award.

Tafa, on one day's notice, faced Marcos Rogério de Lima, replacing his injured brother Justin Tafa, on February 17, 2024, at UFC 298. He lost the bout by technical knockout in round two.

Tafa was scheduled to face Karl Williams on March 23, 2024, at UFC on ESPN 53. However, Tafa was pulled from the event due to injury and he was replaced by his brother Justin Tafa.

Tafa faced Valter Walker on August 18, 2024, at UFC 305. After Tafa screamed in pain, the referee called off the fight resulting in Tafa losing the fight via a heel hook technical submission at the end of the first round.

Replacing Waldo Cortes-Acosta and on short notice, Tafa was scheduled to face Chris Barnett on October 12, 2024 at UFC Fight Night 244. However, Barnett withdrew after being unable to travel due to Hurricane Milton and was replaced by UFC newcomer Sean Sharaf. Tafa won the fight by technical knockout in the second round.

Tafa was expected to face Tuco Tokkos in a light heavyweight bout on May 3, 2025 at UFC on ESPN 67. However, the bout was removed from the card as a result of injuries from both fighters. The pairing was rescheduled and eventually took place on July 12, 2025 at UFC on ESPN 70. Tafa lost the fight via an arm-triangle choke submission in the second round.

Tafa was scheduled to face İbo Aslan on September 28, 2025 at UFC Fight Night 260. However, the bout was canceled due to an injury with Tafa.

Tafa faced Billy Elekana on February 1, 2026 at UFC 325. He lost the fight via a second round rear-naked choke submission.

Tafa faced Kevin Christian on May 2, 2026, at UFC Fight Night 275. He won the fight via knockout in round one.

Replacing Billy Elekana who withdrew for undisclosed reasons, Tafa faced Iwo Baraniewski on June 6, 2026 at UFC Fight Night 278. He lost the fight by technical knockout via a leg kick and punches in the first round.

Tafa was scheduled to face Liu Ce on August 30, 2026, at UFC Fight Night 286. However, Tafa pulled out due to undisclosed reasons and was replaced by Levi Rodrigues Jr.

Tafa is scheduled to face promotional newcomer Quentin Pasley on December 12, 2026 at UFC 335.

== Championships and accomplishments ==
- Ultimate Fighting Championship
  - Performance of the Night (One time) vs. Parker Porter

== Mixed martial arts record ==
Professional record breakdown
13 matches	7 wins	6 losses
By knockout	7	2
By submission	0	3
By decision	0	1

Res.	Record	Opponent	Method	Event	Date	Round	Time	Location	Notes
Loss	7–6	Iwo Baraniewski	TKO (leg kick and punches)	UFC Fight Night: Muhammad vs. Bonfim	June 6, 2026	1	1:25	Las Vegas, Nevada, United States	
Win	7–5	Kevin Christian	KO (punches and elbows)	UFC Fight Night: Della Maddalena vs. Prates	May 2, 2026	1	2:42	Perth, Australia	
Loss	6–5	Billy Elekana	Submission (rear-naked choke)	UFC 325	February 1, 2026	2	3:18	Sydney, Australia	
Loss	6–4	Tuco Tokkos	Submission (arm-triangle choke)	UFC on ESPN: Lewis vs. Teixeira	July 12, 2025	2	4:25	Nashville, Tennessee, United States	Return to Light Heavyweight.
Win	6–3	Sean Sharaf	TKO (punches)	UFC Fight Night: Royval vs. Taira	October 12, 2024	2	2:15	Las Vegas, Nevada, United States	
Loss	5–3	Valter Walker	Submission (heel hook)	UFC 305	August 18, 2024	1	4:56	Perth, Australia	
Loss	5–2	Marcos Rogério de Lima	TKO (leg kick and punches)	UFC 298	February 17, 2024	2	1:14	Anaheim, California, United States	
Win	5–1	Parker Porter	KO (punch)	UFC Fight Night: Holloway vs. The Korean Zombie	August 26, 2023	1	1:24	Kallang, Singapore	Performance of the Night.
Loss	4–1	Mohammed Usman	Decision (unanimous)	UFC Fight Night: Pavlovich vs. Blaydes	April 22, 2023	3	5:00	Las Vegas, Nevada, United States	
Win	4–0	Tsuyoshi Sudario	TKO (punches)	Rizin 40	December 31, 2022	1	1:38	Saitama, Japan	
Win	3–0	Nicolas Djurdjević	TKO (punches)	Brave CF 66	November 26, 2022	1	2:02	Bali, Indonesia	
Win	2–0	Kelvin Fitial	KO (punches)	Hex Fight Series 23	August 5, 2022	2	4:36	Melbourne, Australia	Heavyweight debut.
Win	1–0	Taisei Sekino	TKO (punches)	Beatdown Promotions 1	July 9, 2022	1	1:06	Eatons Hill, Australia	Light Heavyweight debut.

== Professional boxing record ==
2 fights	1 win	0 losses
By knockout	1	0
Draws	1	

No.	Result	Record	Opponent	Type	Round, time	Date	Location	Notes
2	Win	1–0–1	(Australia) David Tuliloa	TKO	3 (4)	15 Sep 2022	Nissan Arena, Nathan, Australia	
1	Draw	0–0–1	(Australia) Jayden Joseph	SD	4	3 Jun 2017	Melbourne Park Function Centre, Melbourne, Australia	

== Kickboxing & Muay Thai record ==
Kickboxing & Muay Thai Record (Incomplete)
23 Wins (19 (T)KOs), 5 Losses, 0 Draws
Date	Result	Opponent	Event	Location	Method	Round	Time
2021-04-24	Win	(Australia) Christian Balz	Eruption Muay Thai 20	Brisbane, Australia	KO (Right cross)	1	0:55
2020-12-11	Win	(Australia) Callum Godfrey	Eruption Muay Thai 2019	Brisbane, Australia	KO (Right hook)	1	0:24
2019-05-17	Loss	(Turkey) Cihad Kepenek	Glory 65: Utrecht	Utrecht, Netherlands	Decision (Unanimous)	3	3:00
2018-12-18	Loss	(Morocco) Jamal Ben Saddik	Glory 62: Rotterdam, Heavyweight Tournament Quarter-Finals	Rotterdam, Netherlands	TKO (2 Knockdowns)	1	2:55
2018-09-14	Win	(United States) Haze Wilson	Glory 58: Chicago	Chicago, Illinois, United States	TKO (Referee stoppage)	1	1:35
2018-07-20	Win	(United States) Anthony McDonald	Glory 55: New York	New York City, United States	TKO (3 Knockdowns)	1	2:20
2018-02-16	Loss	(Romania) Benjamin Adegbuyi	Glory 50: Chicago, Heavyweight Contender Tournament Final	Chicago, Illinois, United States	TKO (leg kicks)	2	0:31
2018-02-16	Loss	(Brazil) Guto Inocente	Glory 50: Chicago, Heavyweight Contender Tournament Semi-final	Chicago, Illinois, United States	Decision (unanimous)	3	3:00
2017-10-14	Win	(China) Quanchao Luo	Glory 46: China	Guangzhou, China	TKO (three knockdowns)	1	1:34
2017-04-28	Win	(New Zealand) Johnny Waipouri	Eruption Muay Thai 14	Mansfield, Australia	KO	1	
2016-11-19	Win	(New Zealand) Ricky Barclay	Muay Thai Warriors Action 18	Toowoomba, Australia	Decision (Unanimous)	3	3:00
2016-08-19	Win	(Australia) Hamad Alloush	Kings of Kombat 18	Melbourne, Australia	KO (Right cross)	1	0:25
2015-12-05	Win	(Australia) Jacob Francis	Caged Muay Thai 7	Brisbane, Australia	KO (Right cross)	1	1:40
Wins the Caged Muay Thai Heavyweight title.
2015-05-16	Loss	(New Zealand) Leo Aholelei	Muay Thai Action 15	Toowoomba, Australia	Decision	3	3:00
For the WKA K-1 South Pacific Heavyweight title.
2014-12-06	Win	(Australia) Aaron Cannings	Caged Muay Thai 5	Brisbane, Australia	TKO (punches)	3	0:13
Legend: Win Loss Draw/No contest Notes

== See also ==
- List of current UFC fighters
- List of male mixed martial artists
