= Igor Jurković =

Croatian kickboxer

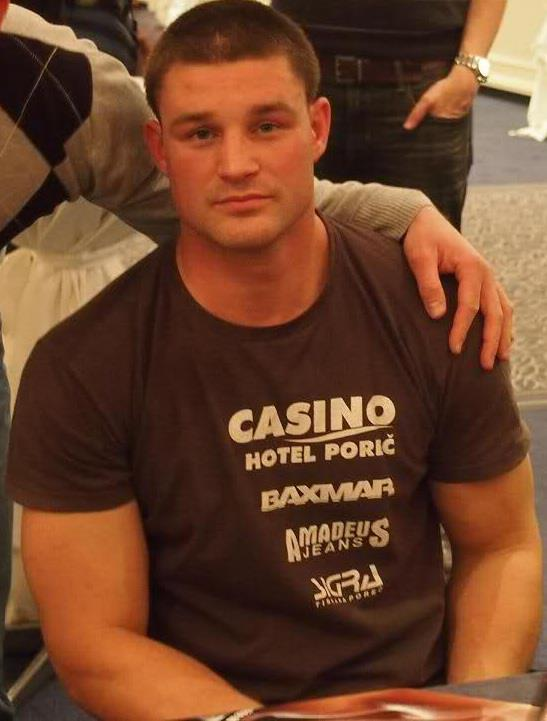
- Born: Igor Jurković; 15 July 1985 (age 41); Poreč, Croatia
- Other names: The Istrian Warrior
- Nationality: Croatian
- Height: 1.88 m (6 ft 2 in)
- Weight: 93.8 kg (207 lb; 14 st 11 lb)
- Division: Light heavyweight Heavyweight
- Reach: 74.0 in (188 cm)
- Style: Kickboxing, Muay Thai
- Stance: Southpaw
- Fighting out of: Poreč, Croatia; Breda, Netherlands
- Team: King Porec; Golden Glory
- Trainer: Leo Komšić; Cor Hemmers

Kickboxing record
- Total: 61
- Wins: 51
- By knockout: 31
- Losses: 10
- By knockout: 2
- Last updated on: 3 May 2014

Igor Jurković (born 15 July 1985) is a Croatian heavyweight kickboxer fighting out of Poreč, Croatia. He was 6 times Croatian national champion: 2004, 2005 and 2006 in Thai boxing; 2005 and 2006 in low kick rules kickboxing; and 2005 in full contact kickboxing. He was also a sparring partner of Mirko Cro Cop. He has fought in K-1 and he is under contract with Glory promotion.

Since 2 November 2015, he has been ranked the #8 light heavyweight in the world by GLORY.

== Biography and career ==
Igor "The Istrian Warrior" Jurković was born in the city of Poreč, Croatia. He started kickboxing after watching Mirko Filipović knocking out Mike Bernardo, and as Bernardo was falling down, a new kickboxer, decisive to continue Croatian kickbox glory was rising. Igor was six time Croatian kickboxing champion, also W.A.K.O. amateur world champion under Muay Thai rules, also winning bronze and silver medals on other W.A.K.O. championships.

He was K-1 Rules "Le Grand Tournoi" 2006 champion. He had a walkthrough in quarter finals because Frédérique Bellonie, last year's champion, suffered injury before tournament. In semi finals he defeated Frédéric Sinistra and won tournament defeating Magomed Magomedov in the final. Tournament was promoted by the K-1 organisation, it was only a prize tournament, not a K-1 qualifying tournament. After that he had a break in his career because of injury sustained while falling off the motorcycle, but successfully returned to kickboxing and won few international tournaments.

In 2011 he signed for Golden Glory, and successfully passed his first test on United Glory 14 event. He knocked down Pavel Zhuravlev in the first round, in the second round he dropped Pavel and broke his nose, causing ringside doctor to stop the fight. After the fight Head Kick Legend magazine ranked Jurkovic as 20. heavyweight kickboxer in August 2011. He "sneaked" there due to a Win against Zhuravlev.

It was later announced that Jurković was scheduled to participate in K-1 World Grand Prix 2011 in Nanjing Final 16 on October 29, 2011, but the event was canceled as K-1 was suffering from financial problems.

=== 2012 ===
On 10 March 2012 he made another big step defeating Freddy Kemayo on "Cro Cop Final Fight", he won in a close fight after extra round.

He was expected to fight Ali Cenik on United Glory 15, but it was later changed and he faced Zabit Samedov, losing the fight via unanimous decision after suffering first round knockdown. Later in the fight Jurković was at least equal fighter, but knockdown was enough for Samedov to take deserved victory. In an interview after the fight he said that he was not ready for two tough fights in that short time.

He was scheduled to fight for the championship belt of Cristian Bosch under WBC Muaythai organization, but he gave up because he was also scheduled to fight in the Glory summer tournament that was planned to happen in Ukraine but cancelled. In an interview Jurković said that he was sorry he could not fight for the belt as he believed that he could take it easily, and that he was never into Muay Thai but he felt the belt would have suited him.

Glory World Series have announced a Glory grand Slam heavyweight 16 man, one-night, single-elimination tournament event in Tokyo, Japan in December, and Igor is expected to be one of 16 participants.

6 October 2012, Brussels, Belgium, Glory 2, it was last test before Glory Heavyweight Grand Slam, and another great victory. This time against Gregory Tony. Power advantage was on Jurković's side at the very beginning of the fight, his quick distance closing and power hooks were too much for French opponent. In the second round, after a punch Gregory's hand suffered a fracture, an old injury witch reopened. But that does not diminish Jurković's victory, which was achieved with many powerful body shoots. Three knockdowns in round two and referee stops the fight.

He competed in the sixteen-man 2012 Glory Heavyweight Grand Slam at Glory 4: Tokyo - 2012 Heavyweight Grand Slam in Saitama, Japan on 31 December 2012. At the opening stage, he faced Anderson "Braddock" Silva and gave up ten kilograms in weight. He lost via TKO when the referee stopped the bout in round one after he was floored twice.

=== 2013 ===
On 19 April 2013, Jurković vs. Cătinaș lived up to the expectations of many of the kickboxing fans that were in attendance at FFC03: Jurković vs. Cătinaș in Split, Croatia. A ton of damage was dished out over the course of the fight between both fighters and Igor Jurković won on a unanimous third-round decision in a fight that could have gone either way. After the fight he said that he didn't want to disappoint public and organisation despite breaking his fist in training.

After refusing to fight at Glory 9: New York, because wanted to fight in his hometown Poreč he fought Dževad Poturak at FFC06: Jurković vs. Poturak on 14 June 2013. Jurković dominated all three rounds and deservedly took unanimous decision win.

He fought Jhonata Diniz at Glory 12: New York - Lightweight World Championship Tournament in New York City on 23 November 2013, and lost the fight by first-round TKO. He looked good at the beginning of the fight but got too aggressive when Diniz dropped him with a punch, Igor continued to fight but Diniz finished the job.

=== 2014 ===
He faced Michael Duut at Glory 14 event in Zagreb, Croatia on 8 March 2014. Jurković dropped weight and fought in Glory light heavyweight division. He dropped Duut with punches two times in round one, and referee stopped the fight at 1:14.

He defeated Jovan Kaluđerović early in round one at FFC11: Jurković vs. Kaluđerović in Osijek, Croatia on 4 April 2014, in the main event of the night. Igor was checked with right cross early in the round but recovered and dropped Jovan with punch-knee combination. Finished the fight with few liver kicks at the time of 1:47.

He suffered quite a convincing defeat via UD at Glory 16: Denver by Artem Vakhitov in Broomfield, Colorado, United States on 3 May 2014. While focusing on leg kicks he was outclassed by Vakhitov's boxing and suffered first round knockdown. After the fight Igor said "I lost by judges' decision, but it will not demotivate me. This is now behind me, the mach was OK, but I was not myself. I was slow and I did not have an answer to his combinations."

Before break he will once again fight at FFC13 in a main event of the evening against Luis Tavares on 6 June 2014, in Zadar, Croatia.

== Titles ==
=== Professional ===
- 2014 FFC Light Heavyweight Champion (-95 kg)
- 2010 International Open Muay Thai Cup BiH 2010 Tournament Champion
- 2006 K-1 Rules "Le Grand Tournoi" Champion -100 kg
- 2005 King's Birthday WMC-S1 Championship Tournament runner-up -90 kg

=== Amateur ===
- 2010 Serbia Open 2010 Tournament Champion (low-kick rules)
- 2010 Croatian Kickboxing Championships (silver) +91 kg (low-kick rules)
- 2007 W.A.K.O. World Championships (silver) -91 kg (low-kick rules)
- 2006 W.A.K.O. European Championships (bronze) -91 kg (Thai-boxing rules)
- 2006 Croatian Kickboxing Championships (gold) (low-kick rules)
- 2006 Croatian Thai-Boxing Championships (gold)
- 2005 W.A.K.O. World Championships (gold) -91 kg (Thai-boxing rules)
- 2005 Croatian Kickboxing Championships (gold) -86 kg (low-kick rules)
- 2005 Croatian Kickboxing Championships (gold) -86 kg (full-contact rules)
- 2005 Croatian Muay Thai Championships (gold) -86 kg
- 2004 W.A.K.O. European Championships (bronze) -86 kg (Thai-boxing rules)
- 2004 Croatian Thai-Boxing Championships (gold) -86 kg

== Kickboxing record (incomplete) ==
Professional kickboxing record (incomplete)
28 wins (14 (T)KOs, 14dDecisions), 7 losses (2 (T)KOs, 5 decisions)
Date	Result	Opponent	Event	Location	Method	Round	Time	Record
2014-11-21	Win	(Netherlands) Dennis Stolzenbach	FFC15: Poreč	Poreč, Croatia	Decision (unanimous)	3	3:00	28–7
Wins Vacant FFC Light Heavyweight Championship (-95kg).
2014-06-06	Win	(Cape Verde) Luis Tavares	FFC13: Jurković vs. Tavares	Zadar, Croatia	Decision (unanimous)	3	3:00	27–7
2014-05-03	Loss	(Russia) Artem Vakhitov	Glory 16: Denver	Broomfield, United States	Decision (unanimous)	3	3:00	26–7
2014-04-04	Win	(Serbia) Jovan Kaluđerović	FFC11: Jurković vs. Kaluđerović	Osijek, Croatia	KO (liver kick)	1	1:47	26–6
2014-03-08	Win	(Netherlands) Michael Duut	Glory 14: Zagreb	Zagreb, Croatia	KO	1	1:14	25–6
Dropped his weight division from heavyweight to light heavyweight (-95kg).
2013-11-23	Loss	(Brazil) Jhonata Diniz	Glory 12: New York	New York City, United States	TKO (right hook)	1	1:59	24–6
2013-06-14	Win	(Bosnia and Herzegovina) Dževad Poturak	FFC06: Jurković vs. Poturak	Poreč, Croatia	Decision (unanimous)	3	3:00	24–5
2013-04-19	Win	(Romania) Raul Cătinaș	FFC03: Jurković vs. Cătinaș	Split, Croatia	Decision (unanimous)	3	3:00	23–5
2012-12-31	Loss	(Brazil) Anderson Silva	Glory 4: Tokyo - Heavyweight Grand Slam Tournament, First 16	Saitama, Japan	TKO (referee stoppage)	1	1:29	22–5
2012-10-06	Win	(France) Grégory Tony	Glory 2: Brussels	Brussels, Belgium	TKO (ref stop/3 knockdowns)	2	2:40	22–4
2012-03-23	Loss	(Azerbaijan) Zabit Samedov	United Glory 15	Moscow, Russia	Decision (unanimous)	3	3:00	21–4
2012-03-10	Win	(France) Freddy Kemayo	Cro Cop Final Fight	Zagreb, Croatia	Ext. R. decision (majority)	4	3:00	21–3
2011-11-05	Win	(Slovenia) Tomaž Simonič	Nova Gorica Fight Night 2	Nova Gorica, Slovenia	TKO (body shot)	2	N/A	20–3
2011-05-28	Win	(Ukraine) Pavel Zhuravlev	United Glory 14: 2010-2011 World Series Finals	Moscow, Russia	TKO (doctor stoppage)	2	0:20	19–3
2011-04-17	Win	(Montenegro) Goran Radonjić	WFC 13: Heavy Hitters	Belgrade, Serbia	Decision (unanimous)	3	3:00	18–3
2011-02-25	Win	(Italy) Mattia Fonte Basso	Trieste Fight Night	Trieste, Italy	TKO (ref stoppage)	3	N/A	17–3
2010-12-09	Win	(Russia) Vladimir Mineev	WFC 12: Proteini.si Showtime	Ljubljana, Slovenia	Ext. R. decision	4	3:00	16–3
2010-10-29	Win	(Bosnia and Herzegovina) Nermin Halilovic	Sarajevo Fight Night 2	Sarajevo, Bosnia and Herzegovina	TKO (high kick)	1	N/A	15–3
2010-09-26	Win	(Croatia) Ante Verunica	Memorijal Ludviga Lutka Pavlovića, final	Ljubuski, Bosnia and Herzegovina	Decision (split)	3	3:00	14–3
Wins International Open Muay Thai Cup BiH 2010.
2010-09-26	Win	(Hungary) Tihamer Brunner	Memorijal Ludviga Lutka Pavlovića, semi finals	Ljubuski, Bosnia and Herzegovina	TKO (broken elbow)	2	N/A	13–3
2010-07-31	Win	(Bosnia and Herzegovina) Muamer Tufekčić	WFC 11: Bash at the Beach	Portorož, Slovenia	Decision	3	3:00	12–3
2010-07-09	Loss	(Croatia) Marin Došen	Mega Fight	Umag, Croatia	Decision	3	3:00	11–3
2010-04-18	Win	(Croatia) Igor Mihaljević	5. Kickboxing memorijal "David Šain"	Poreč, Croatia	TKO (leg injury)	2	N/A	11–2
2010-03-20	Win	(Bosnia and Herzegovina) Adis Dadović	Noć Šampiona	Zenica, Bosnia and Herzegovina	KO (high kick)	2	N/A	10–2
2009-12-23	Win	(Bosnia and Herzegovina) Sanid Imamović	Noć Boksa	Zadar, Croatia	KO	1	N/A	9–2
2007-03-16	Win	(Serbia) Mario Milosavljević	Obračun na 4 rijeke - Noć gladijatora	Karlovac, Croatia	KO (high kick)	1	N/A	8–2
2006-10-15	Win	(Serbia) Dragan Jovanović	Hrvatska - Srbija	Osijek, Croatia	Decision (unanimous)	3	3:00	7–2
2006-05-26	Win	(Russia) Magomed Magomedov	K-1 Rules "Le Grand Tournoi" 2006, Final	Paris, France	Decision	3	3:00	6–2
Wins K-1 Rules "Le Grand Tournoi" 2006 Tournament.
2006-05-26	Win	(Belgium) Frédéric Sinistra	K-1 Rules Le Grand Tournoi 2006, Semi Finals	Paris, France	KO (high kick)	3	N/A	5–2
Had walktrough in quarter finals as Frédérique Bellonie was injured.
2006-04-15	Win	(Croatia) Josip Ivanisic	1. Kickboxing memorijal "David Šain"	Poreč, Croatia	Decision	3	3:00	4–2
2005-12-05	Loss	(Russia) Magomed Magomedov	King's Birthday S-1 Championship, Final	Bangkok, Thailand	Decision	3	3:00	3–2
For King's Birthday S-1 Championship -90 kg.
2005-12-05	Win	(Iran) Iszmir	King's Birthday S-1 Championship, Semi Finals	Bangkok, Thailand	KO	N/A	N/A	3–1
2005-07-22	Win	(Croatia) Ivan Stanić	Gold Liga	Mali Losinj, Croatia	N/A	N/A	N/A	2–1
2005-06-24	Loss	(Czech Republic) Tomáš Hron	Fighters' Night	Krupka, Czech Republic	Decision	5	2:00	1–1
2005-01-14	Win	(Bosnia and Herzegovina) Bojan Glavaš	Sokol Kup - Gold Liga	Pula, Croatia	Decision	3	3:00	1–0

Amateur kickboxing record (incomplete)
23 wins (16 (T)KOs, 7 decisions), 3 losses (2 decisions, 1 unknown)
Date	Result	Opponent	Event	Location	Method	Round	Time
2010-05-01	Loss	(Croatia) Ante Verunica	Croatian Kickboxing Championship, Low-Kick +91 kg Final	Šibenik, Croatia	N/A	N/A	N/A
Wins Croatian Kickboxing Low-Kick Championship Silver Medal +91 kg.
2010-05-01	Win	(Croatia) N/A	Croatian Kickboxing Championship, Low-Kick +91 kg Semi Finals	Šibenik, Croatia	N/A	N/A	N/A
2010-01-31	Win	(Serbia) Mladen Božić	Serbia Open 2010, Final	Belgrade, Serbia	Decision (unanimous)	3	2:00
Wins Serbia Open tournament. He was given the trophy "Zoran Šijan" as the best fighter of the tournament.
2010-01-30	Win	(Serbia) Srdjan Seleš	Serbia Open 2010, Semi Finals	Belgrade, Serbia	Decision (unanimous)	3	2:00
2010-01-30	Win	(North Macedonia) Filip Boranijev	Serbia Open 2010, Quarter Finals	Belgrade, Serbia	KO	3	N/A
2007-09-30	Loss	(Belarus) Yauhen Anhalevich	W.A.K.O World Championships 2007, Low-Kick Final -91 kg	Belgrade, Serbia	Decision (split)	3	2:00
Wins W.A.K.O. World Championship '07 Low-Kick Silver Medal -91 kg.
2007-09-??	Win	(Russia) Dmitriy Antonenko	W.A.K.O World Championships 2007, Low-Kick Semi Final -91 kg	Belgrade, Serbia	Decision (split)	3	2:00
2007-09-??	Win	(Italy) Umberto Lucci	W.A.K.O World Championships 2007, Low-Kick Quarter Finals -91 kg	Belgrade, Serbia	Decision (unanimous)	3	2:00
2007-09-??	Win	(South Africa) Pete Motaung	W.A.K.O World Championships 2007, Low-Kick 1st Round -91 kg	Belgrade, Serbia	KO	1	N/A
2006-11-??	Win	(Bosnia and Herzegovina) Dalibor Krsic	W.A.K.O European Championships 2006, Thai-Boxing Quarter Finals -91 kg	Skopje, Macedonia	KO	2	N/A
Wins W.A.K.O. World Championship '06 Thai-Boxing Bronze Medal -91 kg; Jurković withdrew because of injury.
2006-02-26	Win	(Croatia) Vladimir Čelar	Croatian Kickboxing Championship, Thai-Boxing -91 kg Final	Zadar, Croatia	Decision	3	2:00
Wins Croatian Kickboxing Thai-Boxing Championship Gold Medal -91 kg.
2005-09-??	Win	(Russia) Alexei Shevtsova	W.A.K.O World Championships 2005, Thai-Boxing Final -91 kg	Agadir, Morocco	Decision	3	2:00
Wins W.A.K.O. World Championship '05 Thai-Boxing Gold Medal -91 kg.
2005-09-22	Win	(Belarus) Andrei Malchanau	W.A.K.O World Championships 2005, Thai-Boxing Semi Finals -91 kg	Agadir, Morocco	N/A	N/A	N/A
2005-04-05	Win	(Croatia) Marin Roso	Croatian Kickboxing Championship, Low-Kick -86 kg Final	Rijeka, Croatia	KO	1	N/A
Wins Croatian Kickboxing Low-Kick Championship Gold Medal -86 kg.
2005-04-05	Win	(Croatia) Tomislav Jurić	Croatian Kickboxing Championship, Low-Kick -86 kg Semi Finals	Rijeka, Croatia	KO	N/A	N/A
2005-04-05	Win	(Croatia) N/A	Croatian Kickboxing Championship, Low-Kick -86 kg Quarter Finals	Rijeka, Croatia	KO	N/A	N/A
2005-03-05	Win	(Croatia) Dragan Kuzmić	Croatian Kickboxing Championship, Full-Contact -86 kg Final	Zagreb, Croatia	RTD	2	N/A
Wins Croatian Kickboxing Full-Contact Championship Gold Medal -86 kg.
2005-03-05	Win	(Croatia) N/A	Croatian Kickboxing Championship, Full-Contact -86 kg Semi Finals	Zagreb, Croatia	N/A	N/A	N/A
2004-10-??	Loss	(Belarus) Yauhen Anhalevich	W.A.K.O European Championships 2004, Thai-Boxing Semi Finals -86 kg	Budva, Montenegro	Decision (split)	3	2:00
Wins W.A.K.O. World Championship '04 Thai-Boxing Bronze Medal -86 kg.
2004-10-??	Win	(Poland) Pawel Jasinski	W.A.K.O European Championships 2004, Thai-Boxing Quarter Finals -86 kg	Budva, Montenegro	Decision (unanimous)	3	2:00
2004-05-16	Win	(Croatia) Dean Deanović	Croatian Kickboxing Championship, Thai-Boxing -86 kg Final	Osijek, Croatia	N/A	N/A	N/A
Wins Croatian Kickboxing Thai-Boxing Championship Gold Medal -86 kg.
2004-05-16	Win	(Croatia) N/A	Croatian Kickboxing Championship, Thai-Boxing -86 kg Semi Finals	Osijek, Croatia	N/A	N/A	N/A
Legend: Win Loss Draw/no contest Notes

== See also ==
- List of WAKO Amateur World Championships
- List of WAKO Amateur European Championships
- List of male kickboxers
