= Bogdan Guskov =

Uzbek mixed martial artist (born 1992)

- Born: Bogdan Vladimirovich Guskov; 12 September 1992 (age 34); Dukent, Uzbekistan
- Native name: Гуськов Богдан
- Nickname: Hitman
- Height: 6 ft 3 in (191 cm)
- Weight: 205 lb (93 kg; 14 st 9 lb)
- Division: Light Heavyweight
- Reach: 76 in (193 cm)
- Stance: Orthodox
- Fighting out of: Dukent, Uzbekistan
- Team: GOR MMA; American Top Team
- Trainer: Gor Azizyan; Georgy Uzun
- Rank: Brown belt in Brazilian Jiu-Jitsu; Master of Sport in MMA; Master of Sport in Boxing
- Years active: 2015–present

Mixed martial arts record
- Total: 23
- Wins: 18
- By knockout: 15
- By submission: 3
- Losses: 4
- By knockout: 2
- By submission: 1
- By decision: 1
- Draws: 1

Other information
- Mixed martial arts record from Sherdog

Bogdan Vladimirovich Guskov (born 12 September 1992) is an Uzbek professional mixed martial artist who currently competes in the Light Heavyweight division of the Ultimate Fighting Championship (UFC). As of 24 October 2026, he is #10 in the Meta UFC light heavyweight rankings.

== Early life ==
Guskov was born in the village of Dukent in Uzbekistan to an ethnic Russian family. He grew up poor and has been involved in sports since childhood, first in athletics, then in volleyball. Subsequently, he started going to the gym and became interested in street fighting. Guskov's mother was against her son engaging in martial arts, but the aspiring fighter was helped out by his aunt, who paid for boxing and kickboxing sessions until Guskov won a competition and classes became free. He also attended the Dukent Radio Engineering College, where he received a secondary specialized education as a welder.

At the age of 19, Guskov moved to Moscow, leaving sports for 3 years, where he got a job as an installer of ventilation systems, and due to low wages, he began working as a bouncer in a club. He returned to sports at the age of 22, participating in several boxing and kickboxing tournaments. While working at the club, Guskov had the pseudonym "Yugoslav," and his first fights went under the nickname "Hugo". Later, he gave himself the nickname "Czarevitch," explaining that he wanted something unusual. While participating in boxing and kickboxing tournaments, he did not find the same emotions and decided to switch to MMA.

== Mixed martial arts career ==
=== Early career ===
Guskov made his MMA debut on 20 December 2015 against Biksultan Saburzhanov, where he defeated his opponent in the first round. His following fights took place at various tournaments, such as MMA-SERIES, MPL, FIGHT NIGHT GLOBAL, Gladius Glory Championship, Golden Team Championship, Alliance Fighting Championships, Battle of Titans, Zolotoy Vityaz MMA Golden Knight and Tech-Krep FC. Guskov compiled a record of 14–2 and was riding a four-fight win streak, before being signed by the UFC.

=== Ultimate Fighting Championship ===
Making his UFC debut, Guskov faced a top-15 ranked fighter, Volkan Oezdemir, on 2 September 2023 at UFC Fight Night 226, replacing Azamat Murzakanov on a short notice. He lost the fight via a rear-naked choke submission in the first round.

Guskov faced Zac Pauga on 10 February 2024 at UFC Fight Night 236. He won the fight via knockout in the first round. This fight earned him a Performance of the Night award.

Guskov faced Ryan Spann on 27 April 2024 at UFC on ESPN 55. He won the fight via technical knockout as a result of ground-and-pound punches. This fight earned him his second Performance of the Night award.

Guskov was scheduled to face Johnny Walker on 18 January 2025 at UFC 311. However, Walker withdrew from the fight due to an injury and was replaced by promotional newcomer Billy Elekana. He won the fight via a guillotine choke submission in the second round.

Guskov faced Nikita Krylov on 26 July 2025 at UFC on ABC 9. He won the fight by technical knockout in the first round.

Guskov was scheduled to face former UFC Light Heavyweight Champion Jan Błachowicz on 22 November 2025 at UFC Fight Night 265. However, for unknown reasons, it was moved and took place on 6 December 2025 at UFC 323. The bout ended in a majority draw.

Guskov was scheduled to face Jan Błachowicz in a rematch on 9 May 2026 at UFC 328. However, Błachowicz withdrew due to a torn meniscus. The bout was re-scheduled for 1 August 2026 at UFC Fight Night 283. In turn, on 13 July, Guskov was moved to headline the previous week's event, UFC Fight Night 282 against former champion Magomed Ankalaev on 25 July 2026, after Khalil Rountree Jr. withdrew due to injury. Guskov lost the fight by technical knockout in the fifth round.

Guskov is scheduled to face Robert Whittaker on 7 February 2027, at UFC Fight Night 298.

== Championships and accomplishments ==
- Silver medalist of the Moscow K-1 Championship
- Champion of the Federation Cup and silver medalist of the Russian Grappling Championship
- Champion of the Uzbekistan in universal combat

=== Mixed martial arts ===
- Ultimate Fighting Championship
  - Performance of the Night (Two times) vs. Zac Pauga and Ryan Spann
- MMA Fighting
  - 2025 Second Team MMA All-Star

== Mixed martial arts record ==
Professional record breakdown
23 matches	18 wins	4 losses
By knockout	15	2
By submission	3	1
By decision	0	1
Draws	1	

Res.	Record	Opponent	Method	Event	Date	Round	Time	Location	Notes
Loss	18–4–1	Magomed Ankalaev	TKO (punches)	UFC Fight Night: Ankalaev vs. Guskov	25 July 2026	5	2:41	Abu Dhabi, United Arab Emirates	
Draw	18–3–1	Jan Błachowicz	Draw (majority)	UFC 323	6 December 2025	3	5:00	Las Vegas, Nevada, United States	
Win	18–3	Nikita Krylov	KO (punches)	UFC on ABC: Whittaker vs. de Ridder	26 July 2025	1	4:18	Abu Dhabi, United Arab Emirates	
Win	17–3	Billy Elekana	Submission (guillotine choke)	UFC 311	18 January 2025	2	3:33	Inglewood, California, United States	
Win	16–3	Ryan Spann	TKO (punches)	UFC on ESPN: Nicolau vs. Perez	27 April 2024	2	3:16	Las Vegas, Nevada, United States	Performance of the Night.
Win	15–3	Zac Pauga	KO (punches)	UFC Fight Night: Hermansson vs. Pyfer	10 February 2024	1	3:38	Las Vegas, Nevada, United States	Performance of the Night.
Loss	14–3	Volkan Oezdemir	Submission (rear-naked choke)	UFC Fight Night: Gane vs. Spivac	2 September 2023	1	3:46	Paris, France	
Win	14–2	Carlos Eduardo	TKO (punches)	MMA Series 64	18 March 2023	1	0:25	Hurghada, Egypt	
Win	13–2	Alireza Vafai	KO (punch)	MMA Series 61	28 November 2022	1	0:30	Yerevan, Armenia	
Win	12–2	Abdul Elwahab Saeed	TKO (punches)	MMA Series 59	5 November 2022	1	4:26	Moscow, Russia	
Win	11–2	Vadim Litvin	TKO (punches)	Muradov Professional League 1	22 October 2021	1	3:51	Tashkent, Uzbekistan	
Loss	10–2	Vyacheslav Vasilevsky	KO (punches)	AMC Fight Nights: Winter Cup	24 December 2020	3	3:01	Moscow, Russia	
Win	10–1	Nurlan Toktobakiev	TKO (knee and punches)	Brave CF 32	14 December 2019	3	2:17	Bishkek, Kyrgyzstan	
Win	9–1	Sergey Kalinin	TKO (punches)	RCC Intro 4	8 May 2019	1	1:27	Yekaterinburg, Russia	
Win	8–1	Konstantin Andreitsev	Submission (triangle choke)	RCC Intro 2	24 November 2018	2	1:17	Yekaterinburg, Russia	
Win	7–1	Alikhan Magomedov	Submission (rear-naked choke)	Golden Team Championship 3	10 March 2018	1	N/A	Moscow, Russia	
Win	6–1	Taro Blaglo	KO (punch)	Legion FC: Universal Battle 1	8 February 2018	1	2:43	Tashkent, Uzbekistan	
Win	5–1	Ilya Gunenko	KO (punch)	Fight Nights Global 69	30 June 2017	2	0:31	Novosibirsk, Russia	Return to Light Heavyweight.
Win	4–1	Ivan Lunechka	TKO (punches)	Alliance FC: Battle of Titans	22 April 2017	1	0:40	Kursk, Russia	
Win	3–1	Dmitry Soloviev	KO (punches)	Zolotoy Vityaz MMA: Golden Knight	17 September 2016	1	1:08	Moscow, Russia	
Loss	2–1	Arkadiy Lisin	Decision (unanimous)	Tech-Krep FC: Prime Selection 10	5 August 2016	2	5:00	Krasnodar, Russia	Tech-Krep FC Heavyweight Grand Prix Semifinal.
Win	2–0	Abdulkhalik Magomedov	KO (punches)	Tech-Krep FC: Prime Selection 9	7 July 2016	1	4:35	Krasnodar, Russia	Heavyweight debut. Tech-Krep FC Heavyweight Grand Prix Quarterfinal.
Win	1–0	Biksultan Sabyrzhanov	TKO (punches)	RMMAF: Federation Cup 2015	20 December 2015	1	1:13	Moscow, Russia	Light Heavyweight debut.

== See also ==
- List of current UFC fighters
- List of male mixed martial artists
