= UFC on ESPN: Holm vs. Aldana =

UFC mixed martial arts event in 2020

- The poster for UFC on ESPN: Holm vs. Aldana
- Promotion: Ultimate Fighting Championship
- Date: October 4, 2020
- Venue: du Forum
- City: Abu Dhabi, United Arab Emirates
- Attendance: None (behind closed doors)

Event chronology
UFC 253: Adesanya vs. Costa	UFC on ESPN: Holm vs. Aldana	UFC Fight Night: Moraes vs. Sandhagen

UFC on ESPN: Holm vs. Aldana (also known as UFC on ESPN 16 and UFC Fight Island 4) was a mixed martial arts event produced by the Ultimate Fighting Championship that took place on October 4, 2020 at the du Forum on Yas Island, Abu Dhabi, United Arab Emirates.

== Background ==
Without fans in attendance, the promotion did not have to worry about the local timing of the event, so the plan was to proceed with normal timing for prime time hours on the east coast of North America. The main card was scheduled to begin at 6:30 am (October 4) local time in Abu Dhabi, with a full preliminary card beginning at approximately 3:30 am Gulf Standard Time.

A women's bantamweight bout between former UFC Women's Bantamweight Champion Holly Holm and Irene Aldana served as the event headliner. The pairing was originally scheduled to headline UFC Fight Night: Brunson vs. Shahbazyan. However, it was reported on July 22 that Aldana had pulled out of the fight due to testing positive for COVID-19. Holm was also removed from the card as well, with the pairing left intact and ultimately rescheduled for this event.

Ben Sosoli was briefly linked to a heavyweight bout with Yorgan De Castro. However, Sosoli pulled out of the fight in late July citing an eye surgery and was replaced by Carlos Felipe.

A women's bantamweight bout between former UFC Women's Flyweight Champion Nicco Montaño and Julia Avila was originally scheduled for UFC Fight Night: Lewis vs. Oleinik. However, due to Montaño’s coach John Wood testing positive for COVID-19, the bout was rescheduled for UFC Fight Night: Overeem vs. Sakai. In turn, it was announced on August 29 that Montaño herself tested positive for the disease and the bout was once again pushed back to this event. On September 3, it was announced that Montaño withdrew from the bout due to travel restrictions. In turn, Avila was rescheduled to face Sijara Eubanks at UFC Fight Night: Waterson vs. Hill on September 12.

A light heavyweight bout between former UFC Light Heavyweight Championship challengers Thiago Santos and Glover Teixeira was initially scheduled to headline UFC Fight Night: Waterson vs. Hill. However, the pairing was rescheduled for this event after Teixeira tested positive for COVID-19 a week prior to the fight. On September 15, the bout was postponed again as Santos tested positive for the disease.

Charles Oliveira was expected to face Beneil Dariush in a lightweight bout at the event. However, Oliveira pulled out of the fight in early September for undisclosed reasons and the bout was scrapped.

A bantamweight bout between Casey Kenney and Alateng Heili was originally expected to take place a week earlier at UFC 253. However, it was later moved to this event due to undisclosed reasons.

Danaa Batgerel was expected to face Kyler Phillips in a bantamweight bout at the event. However, it was announced on September 21 that Batgerel pulled out due to travel restrictions related to the COVID-19 pandemic in Mongolia. He was replaced by promotional newcomer Cameron Else.

A heavyweight bout between former UFC Heavyweight Champion Andrei Arlovski and Tanner Boser was briefly scheduled for this event, but was later moved to UFC on ESPN: Santos vs. Teixeira due to Arlovski being ill.

A middleweight bout between Tom Breese and Roman Kopylov was originally scheduled for this event, but Kopylov was removed from the bout on September 27 due to undisclosed reasons and replaced by KB Bhullar. The bout subsequently took place a week later at UFC Fight Night: Moraes vs. Sandhagen.

== Results ==
Main card (ESPN / ESPN+)
Weight class				Method	Round	Time	Notes
Women's Bantamweight	Holly Holm	def.	Irene Aldana	Decision (unanimous) (50–44, 50–45, 50–45)	5	5:00
Heavyweight	Carlos Felipe	def.	Yorgan De Castro	Decision (unanimous) (30–27, 30–27, 29–28)	3	5:00
Women’s Bantamweight	Germaine de Randamie	def.	Julianna Peña	Technical Submission (guillotine choke)	3	3:25
Bantamweight	Kyler Phillips	def.	Cameron Else	TKO (punches and elbows)	2	0:44
Middleweight	Duško Todorović	def.	Dequan Townsend	TKO (punches)	2	3:15
Preliminary card (ESPN+)
Welterweight	Carlos Condit	def.	Court McGee	Decision (unanimous) (30–27, 30–27, 30–27)	3	5:00
Featherweight	Charles Jourdain	vs.	Joshua Culibao	Draw (split) (30–27, 28–29, 28–28)	3	5:00
Middleweight	Nassourdine Imavov	def.	Jordan Williams	Decision (unanimous) (29–27, 29–27, 29–28)	3	5:00
Women’s Strawweight	Loma Lookboonmee	def.	Jinh Yu Frey	Decision (unanimous) (30–27, 30–27, 29–28)	3	5:00
Bantamweight	Casey Kenney	def.	Alateng Heili	Decision (unanimous) (30–25, 30–26, 30–27)	3	5:00
Lightweight	Luigi Vendramini	def.	Jessin Ayari	TKO (head kick and punches)	1	1:12

== Bonus awards ==
The following fighters received $50,000 bonuses.

- Fight of the Night: No bonus awarded.
- Performance of the Night: Germaine de Randamie, Kyler Phillips, Duško Todorović, and Luigi Vendramini

== See also ==
- List of UFC events
- List of current UFC fighters
- 2020 in UFC
