= Barb Honchak =

American mixed martial arts (MMA) fighter

- Born: Barbara Marie Honchak; August 30, 1979 (age 47); Edwardsville, Illinois, United States
- Other names: Little Warrior
- Height: 5 ft 4 in (1.63 m)
- Weight: 125 lb (57 kg; 8.9 st)
- Division: Flyweight
- Reach: 66 in (168 cm)
- Style: Brazilian jiu-jitsu
- Fighting out of: High Ridge, Missouri, United States
- Team: Fit or Fight Berger's MMA (formerly); Miletich Fighting Systems (2012–2015); Catalyst Fight House (2017–2018)
- Years active: 2007–2018

Mixed martial arts record
- Total: 14
- Wins: 10
- By knockout: 1
- By submission: 2
- By decision: 7
- Losses: 4
- By knockout: 1
- By decision: 3

Other information
- Mixed martial arts record from Sherdog

Barbara Marie Honchak (born August 30, 1979) is a retired American professional female mixed martial artist. She is the first Invicta FC Flyweight Champion. She has four wins in the Invicta FC promotion and holds notable victories over Vanessa Porto, Roxanne Modafferi, Leslie Smith and Felice Herrig.

== Background ==
Honchak grew up in Edwardsville, Illinois, and has one sister, Tammy. In her youth, Barb loved outdoor activities like horseback riding, scuba diving and camping. She went to Edwardsville High School, where she graduated in 1997. Then she earned an associate degree from Lewis & Clark Community College. She has a bachelor's degree in molecular biology from Western Washington University and her master's in ecological genetics from Northern Arizona University. She is married to her husband, Timm.

After receiving her degrees, she moved back to Midwest because of her fiancée's career, and started training Brazilian jiu-jitsu for self-defense under Steve Berger at the age of 26. From there on, she quickly took an amateur mixed martial arts bout and was hooked to the sport.

== Mixed martial arts career ==
Honchak went 8–1 as an amateur mixed martial artist and made her professional debut on November 28, 2009.

In her fourth professional fight, Honchak defeated Felice Herrig at Hoosier FC 6 on January 14, 2011.

Honchak won three more fights in 2011, defeating Amber McAvoy and Nina Ansaroff by decision and Roxanne Modafferi by submission due to a rear-naked choke.

=== Invicta Fighting Championships ===
As the first bout of her three-fight contract, Honchak made her Invicta Fighting Championships debut on July 28, 2012, at Invicta FC 2: Baszler vs. McMann. She defeated Bethany Marshall by TKO in the second round.

On October 28, 2012, Honchak faced Aisling Daly at Invicta FC 3: Penne vs. Sugiyama. She defeated Daly by unanimous decision.

The victory over Daly earned Honchak a shot at the inaugural Invicta FC Flyweight title on April 5, 2013, at Invicta FC 5: Penne vs. Waterson. She defeated Vanessa Porto by unanimous decision to become the first Invicta FC Flyweight Champion.

Honchak faced Leslie Smith at Invicta FC 7: Honchak vs. Smith on December 7, 2013. She successfully defended her Invicta FC title, winning via unanimous decision. The bout earned both fighters the Fight of the Night honors.

Honchak faced Takayo Hashi at Invicta FC 9 on November 1, 2014, and successfully defended her title with another unanimous decision victory. As a result of relocating, she had problems finding a team to train in, which in turn led to the stripping of her title due to inactivity.

=== The Ultimate Fighter ===
In August 2017, it was announced that after a few years away from the sport Honchak would be one of the fighters featured on The Ultimate Fighter 26, where the process to crown the UFC's inaugural 125-pound Women's Champion will take place.

In the first round, Honchak defeated Gillian Robertson via TKO in the second round, allowing her to move on to the next stage of the competition. In the quarterfinals, Honchak faced Rachael Ostovich-Berdon and won the fight by unanimous decision after two rounds. In the semifinals, Honchak faced Nicco Montaño. She lost the fight via unanimous decision after three rounds.

=== Ultimate Fighting Championship ===
Honchak was scheduled to face Roxanne Modafferi on December 1, 2017, at The Ultimate Fighter 26 Finale. However, on the day of the weigh in, Sijara Eubanks was pulled from the fight for kidney failure while trying to make weight and she was replaced by Modafferi to face Nicco Montaño. Honchak instead faced Lauren Murphy. She lost the back-and-forth fight by split decision.

The rematch between Honchak and Roxanne Modafferi was rescheduled to take place July 6, 2018, at UFC TUF 27 Finale. Honchak lost the fight via technical knockout in round two.

Honchak was released by the UFC in August 2018. She has retired since.

== Championships and accomplishments ==
=== Mixed martial arts ===
- Invicta FC
  - Flyweight Championship (One time; first; former)
    - Two Successful Title Defenses
  - Fight of the Night (One Time) vs. Leslie Smith
- Women's MMA Awards
  - 2013 Fighter of the Year
  - 2013 Flyweight of the Year
- AwakeningFighters.com WMMA Awards
  - 2013 Flyweight of the Year

== Mixed martial arts record ==
Professional record breakdown
| 14 matches | 10 wins | 4 losses |
| By knockout | 1 | 1 |
| By submission | 2 | 0 |
| By decision | 7 | 3 |

| Res. | Record | Opponent | Method | Event | Date | Round | Time | Location | Notes |
|---|---|---|---|---|---|---|---|---|---|
| Loss | 10–4 | Roxanne Modafferi | TKO (elbows) | The Ultimate Fighter: Undefeated Finale | July 6, 2018 | 2 | 3:32 | Las Vegas, Nevada, United States | |
| Loss | 10–3 | Lauren Murphy | Decision (split) | The Ultimate Fighter: A New World Champion Finale | December 1, 2017 | 3 | 5:00 | Las Vegas, Nevada, United States | |
| Win | 10–2 | Takayo Hashi | Decision (unanimous) | Invicta FC 9: Honchak vs. Hashi | November 1, 2014 | 5 | 5:00 | Davenport, Iowa, United States | Defended the Invicta FC Flyweight Championship. |
| Win | 9–2 | Leslie Smith | Decision (unanimous) | Invicta FC 7: Honchak vs. Smith | December 7, 2013 | 5 | 5:00 | Kansas City, Missouri, United States | Defended the Invicta FC Flyweight Championship. Fight of the Night. |
| Win | 8–2 | Vanessa Porto | Decision (unanimous) | Invicta FC 5: Penne vs. Waterson | April 5, 2013 | 5 | 5:00 | Kansas City, Missouri, United States | Won the inaugural Invicta FC Flyweight Championship. |
| Win | 7–2 | Aisling Daly | Decision (unanimous) | Invicta FC 3: Penne vs. Sugiyama | October 6, 2012 | 3 | 5:00 | Kansas City, Kansas, United States | |
| Win | 6–2 | Bethany Marshall | TKO (punches) | Invicta FC 2: Baszler vs. McMann | July 28, 2012 | 2 | 1:22 | Kansas City, Kansas, United States | |
| Win | 5–2 | Roxanne Modafferi | Submission (rear-naked choke) | BEP 5: Breast Cancer Beatdown | October 1, 2011 | 3 | 1:46 | Fletcher, North Carolina, United States | |
| Win | 4–2 | Nina Ansaroff | Decision (unanimous) | Crowbar MMA: Spring Brawl 2 | April 29, 2011 | 3 | 5:00 | Fargo, North Dakota, United States | |
| Win | 3–2 | Amber McAvoy | Decision (unanimous) | WC: Wright Fights 2 | March 11, 2011 | 3 | 5:00 | St. Charles, Missouri, United States | |
| Win | 2–2 | Felice Herrig | Decision (unanimous) | Hoosier FC 6: New Years Nemesis | January 14, 2011 | 3 | 5:00 | Valparaiso, Indiana, United States | |
| Loss | 1–2 | Angela Magaña | Decision (split) | Ultimate Women Challenge | September 24, 2010 | 3 | 5:00 | St George, Utah, United States | |
| Loss | 1–1 | Cat Zingano | Decision (unanimous) | Fight to Win: Phenoms | January 30, 2010 | 3 | 5:00 | Denver, Colorado, United States | For the Fight To Win Women's Bantamweight Championship. |
| Win | 1–0 | Monica Lovato | Submission (rear-naked choke) | KOTC: Horse Power | November 28, 2009 | 2 | 3:58 | Mescalero, New Mexico, United States | |

=== Mixed martial arts exhibition record ===
| Exhibition record breakdown | | |
| 3 matches | 2 wins | 1 loss |
| By knockout | 1 | 0 |
| By decision | 1 | 1 |

| Res. | Record | Opponent | Method | Event | Date | Round | Time | Location | Notes |
|---|---|---|---|---|---|---|---|---|---|
| Loss | 2–1 | Nicco Montaño | Decision (unanimous) | The Ultimate Fighter: A New World Champion | November 22, 2017 (air date) | 3 | 5:00 | Las Vegas, Nevada, United States | TUF 26 Semi-Finals. |
| Win | 2–0 | Rachael Ostovich-Berdon | Decision (unanimous) | The Ultimate Fighter: A New World Champion | November 15, 2017 (air date) | 2 | 5:00 | Las Vegas, Nevada, United States | TUF 26 Quarter-Finals. |
| Win | 1–0 | Gillian Robertson | TKO (punches and elbows) | The Ultimate Fighter: A New World Champion | October 4, 2017 (air date) | 2 | 2:27 | Las Vegas, Nevada, United States | TUF 26 preliminary round. |

== See also ==
- List of current mixed martial arts champions
- List of female mixed martial artists

Awards and achievements
| Preceded by New championship | 1st Invicta FC Flyweight Champion; April 5, 2013 – September 22, 2016 | Succeeded by Jennifer Maia |
