= Julianna Peña =

American mixed martial artist (born 1989)

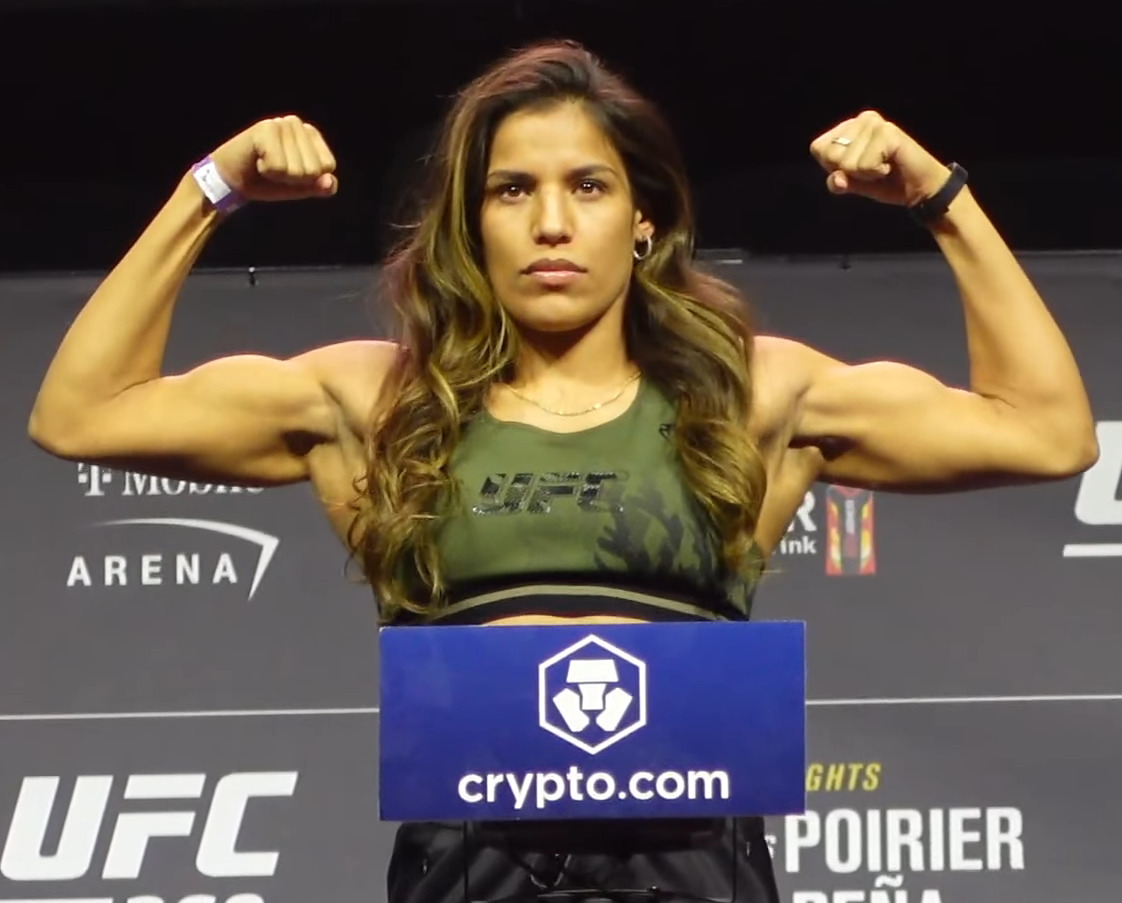
- Peña in 2021
- Born: August 19, 1989 (age 37); Spokane, Washington, U.S.
- Other names: The Venezuelan Vixen
- Height: 5 ft 7 in (170 cm)
- Weight: 135 lb (61 kg; 9.6 st)
- Division: Bantamweight (2013–present); Flyweight (2013)
- Reach: 69 in (175 cm)
- Stance: Orthodox
- Fighting out of: Chicago, Illinois, U.S.
- Team: SikJitsu (2008–present); Luiz Claudio Combat Team; Valle Flow Striking (2016–present); Gregory Boxing & Muay Thai
- Rank: Black belt in Brazilian jiu-jitsu under Luiz Claudio and Thiago Veiga
- Years active: 2009–present

Mixed martial arts record
- Total: 18
- Wins: 12
- By knockout: 3
- By submission: 5
- By decision: 4
- Losses: 6
- By knockout: 1
- By submission: 3
- By decision: 2

Other information
- Mixed martial arts record from Sherdog

Julianna Peña (born August 19, 1989) is an American professional mixed martial artist who competes in the women's Bantamweight division of the Ultimate Fighting Championship (UFC), where she is the former two-time UFC Women's Bantamweight Champion. Peña is the first woman to win The Ultimate Fighter. As of November 14, 2026, she is #4 in the Meta UFC women's bantamweight rankings, and as of November 17, 2026, she is #12 in the UFC women's pound-for-pound rankings.

== Background ==
The youngest of four siblings, Peña was born and raised in Spokane, Washington. Julianna graduated in 2007 from Mt. Spokane High School. She then attended Spokane Community College. In order to lose weight and channel aggression in her early adulthood, she enrolled in a cardio kickboxing class and subsequently transitioned to mixed martial arts.

== Mixed martial arts career ==
=== Early career ===
After going 2–0 as an amateur, Peña made her professional MMA debut in May 2009. She won four consecutive fights but suffered her first defeat in April 2012 to future fellow The Ultimate Fighter 18 cast member Sarah Moras in a 140-pound catchweight bout. The fight took place just two months and one week after Peña was involved in an accident with a drunk driver while walking in downtown Spokane in which she was knocked unconscious and suffered a broken nose. Ten months later she returned to professional competition in a fight in the flyweight division, a move down from the bantamweight division, losing by unanimous decision.

=== The Ultimate Fighter ===
In August 2013, it was announced that Peña was one of the fighters selected to be on The Ultimate Fighter: Team Rousey vs. Team Tate.

Peña faced Gina Mazany in the elimination fight to get into the house. She controlled the fight from early on, winning a clear unanimous decision victory after two rounds.

During the first tournament fight in the house, Peña faced veteran and top-ten ranked Shayna Baszler. Ronda Rousey selected this match-up between the two first female picks. The highly ranked and more experienced Baszler was widely considered the favorite. After a back and forth first round in which Peña landed effective boxing combinations and escaped several of Baszler's submission attempts, Peña came out hard in the second round, connecting with powerful knee strikes that staggered Baszler. The fight went to the ground, where Peña was able to achieve back mount and won via rear naked choke for perhaps the biggest upset victory of the season.

In the semifinals, Peña faced off against Sarah Moras. The two fought previously in a professional bout in 2012, with Peña losing after suffering an injury due to an armbar which forced the doctor to stop the bout between the second and third rounds. Peña won the fight via guillotine choke in the second round to avenge the loss.

=== Ultimate Fighting Championship ===
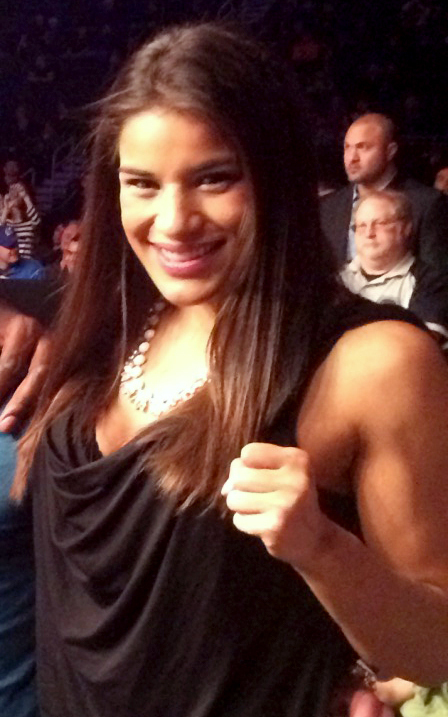
Peña attending UFC Fight Night: Rockhold vs. Philippou, January 2014

Peña faced Jessica Rakoczy in the finals on November 30, 2013, at The Ultimate Fighter 18 Finale. She won the bout via TKO in the final seconds of the first round and became TUF 18 women's bantamweight champion.

==== Injury ====
Peña was expected to face Jessica Andrade at UFC 171 on March 15, 2014. However, Peña pulled out of the bout after suffering an injury to her right knee. She suffered the injury while grappling in training, ultimately damaging, among other aspects, her ACL, MCL, LCL and meniscus. Despite the severity of the injury, doctors assured Peña that her right knee would return to full strength following surgery and rehabilitation. The injury kept Peña out of action for the rest of 2014.

==== UFC return ====
Peña returned to face Milana Dudieva on April 4, 2015, at UFC Fight Night 63. She won the fight via TKO in the first round. The win also earned Peña her first Performance of the Night bonus award.

Peña next faced Jessica Eye on October 3, 2015, at UFC 192. She won the fight by unanimous decision.

Peña faced former title challenger Cat Zingano at UFC 200 on July 9, 2016. She won the fight by unanimous decision.

Peña faced Valentina Shevchenko at UFC on Fox 23 on January 28, 2017. She lost the fight via armbar submission in the second round.

On October 14, 2017, Peña announced that she was pregnant and would be taking an indefinite hiatus from the sport. On July 13, 2019, at UFC Fight Night 155, nearly two and a half years from her last bout, she returned and faced former UFC Women's Flyweight Champion Nicco Montaño, replacing an injured Sara McMann. She won the fight via unanimous decision.

Peña was expected to face Aspen Ladd on March 28, 2020, at UFC on ESPN 8. However, Peña pulled out of the fight in early March citing an injury.

Peña faced Germaine de Randamie on October 4, 2020, at UFC on ESPN: Holm vs. Aldana. She lost the fight via a guillotine choke in round three.

Peña was expected to face Sara McMann on January 16, 2021, at UFC on ABC 1 before being pushed back a week later to UFC 257 on January 24, 2021. Peña won the fight via submission in round three.

Peña was scheduled to face Holly Holm on May 8, 2021, at UFC on ESPN 24. However, Holm was forced to withdraw from the bout citing hydronephrosis.

==== Bantamweight champion ====
Peña was expected to face Amanda Nunes for the UFC Women's Bantamweight Championship on August 7, 2021, at UFC 265. However Nunes tested positive for COVID-19 on July 29, 2021. The bout was rescheduled to UFC 269 on December 11, 2021. After a dominant round one from Nunes, Peña came back in the second to win the bout and championship by rear-naked choke submission in what is regarded as one of the biggest upsets in UFC history.

On February 5, 2022, it was announced that Peña and Nunes would be the coaches for The Ultimate Fighter 30 on ESPN+, which would feature contestants from the heavyweight and women's flyweight divisions.

A rematch against Amanda Nunes for the UFC Women's Bantamweight title took place on July 30, 2022, at UFC 277. Peña lost the fight by unanimous decision.

A trilogy bout with Amanda Nunes was scheduled to take place on June 10, 2023, at UFC 289. However, on May 2, 2023, it was announced that Peña pulled out of the bout due to broken ribs she sustained during training camp. Irene Aldana, who was scheduled to headline UFC Fight Night: Dern vs. Hill, was subsequently chosen to replace her.

Peña faced Raquel Pennington for the UFC Women's Bantamweight Championship on October 5, 2024, at UFC 307. She reclaimed the championship by winning the bout by split decision. 25 out of 26 media outlets scored the bout for Pennington and one scored it as a draw.

Peña faced 2019 and 2021 PFL Women's Lightweight Champion (also 2012 and 2016 Olympic gold medalist in judo) Kayla Harrison on June 7, 2025, at UFC 316. She lost the championship via a kimura submission at the end of the second round.

== Film and television ==
Peña was featured in the award-winning mixed martial arts documentary Fight Life, the film is directed by James Z. Feng and was released in 2012.

She is an announcer, along with Max Bretos, for Combate Americas' English language broadcast on DAZN.

Peña debuted as a commentator for Real American Freestyle (RAF) at RAF 02 on October 25, 2025.

== Personal life ==
Peña is of Mexican and Venezuelan descent. In January 2018, Peña gave birth to her first child, a daughter.

Julianna Peña is the younger sister of former KREM 2 reporter and meteorologist Grace Peña.

== Legal issues ==
On December 20, 2015, Peña was arrested in Spokane, Washington and charged with two counts of assault due to an altercation with bar staff following an earlier street fight in which Josh Gow, her training partner on the Sikjitsu fight team, had been injured. A judge later granted a stipulation order of continuance in her case such that if Peña had no other incidents for a year, the case would be dismissed.

== Championships and accomplishments ==
=== Mixed martial arts ===
- Ultimate Fighting Championship
  - UFC Women's Bantamweight Championship (Two times)
  - The Ultimate Fighter: Team Rousey vs. Team Tate bantamweight tournament Winner
  - Performance of the Night (Two times) vs. Milana Dudieva and Amanda Nunes 1
  - Fifth most total strikes landed in UFC Women's Bantamweight division history (1102)
  - Sixth most takedowns landed in UFC Women's Bantamweight division history (18)
  - UFC Honors Awards
    - 2021: President's Choice Performance of the Year Winner vs. Amanda Nunes 1
  - UFC.com Awards
    - 2021: Upset of the Year vs. Amanda Nunes 1 & Ranked #10 Fighter of the Year
- MMA Junkie
  - 2021 Female Fighter of the Year
  - 2021 January Submission of the Month vs. Sara McMann
  - 2021 December Submission of the Month vs. Amanda Nunes
  - 2021 Upset of the Year vs. Amanda Nunes
- Cageside Press
  - 2021 Upset of the Year vs. Amanda Nunes
- LowKick MMA
  - 2021 Upset of the Year vs. Amanda Nunes
- Sherdog
  - 2021 Upset of the Year vs. Amanda Nunes
- ESPN
  - 2021 Female Fighter of the Year
- Bleacher Report
  - 2013 Female Breakthrough Fighter of the Year
  - 2021 Upset of the Year vs. Amanda Nunes
- MMA Sucka
  - 2021 Upset of the Year vs. Amanda Nunes
- Yahoo! Sports
  - 2021 Submission of the Year vs. Amanda Nunes
- Daily Mirror
  - 2021 Upset of the Year vs. Amanda Nunes
- World MMA Awards
  - 2022 Upset of the Year vs. Amanda Nunes at UFC 269

== Mixed martial arts record ==
Professional record breakdown
18 matches	12 wins	6 losses
By knockout	3	1
By submission	5	3
By decision	4	2

Res.	Record	Opponent	Method	Event	Date	Round	Time	Location	Notes
Loss	12–6	Kayla Harrison	Submission (kimura)	UFC 316	June 7, 2025	2	4:55	Newark, New Jersey, United States	Lost the UFC Women's Bantamweight Championship. Peña was deducted one point in round 1 due to illegal upkicks.
Win	12–5	Raquel Pennington	Decision (split)	UFC 307	October 5, 2024	5	5:00	Salt Lake City, Utah, United States	Won the UFC Women's Bantamweight Championship.
Loss	11–5	Amanda Nunes	Decision (unanimous)	UFC 277	July 30, 2022	5	5:00	Dallas, Texas, United States	Lost the UFC Women's Bantamweight Championship.
Win	11–4	Amanda Nunes	Submission (rear-naked choke)	UFC 269	December 11, 2021	2	3:26	Las Vegas, Nevada, United States	Won the UFC Women's Bantamweight Championship. Performance of the Night.
Win	10–4	Sara McMann	Submission (rear-naked choke)	UFC 257	January 24, 2021	3	3:39	Abu Dhabi, United Arab Emirates	
Loss	9–4	Germaine de Randamie	Technical submission (guillotine choke)	UFC on ESPN: Holm vs. Aldana	October 4, 2020	3	3:25	Abu Dhabi, United Arab Emirates	
Win	9–3	Nicco Montaño	Decision (unanimous)	UFC Fight Night: de Randamie vs. Ladd	July 13, 2019	3	5:00	Sacramento, California, United States	
Loss	8–3	Valentina Shevchenko	Submission (armbar)	UFC on Fox: Shevchenko vs. Peña	January 28, 2017	2	4:29	Denver, Colorado, United States	
Win	8–2	Cat Zingano	Decision (unanimous)	UFC 200	July 9, 2016	3	5:00	Las Vegas, Nevada, United States	
Win	7–2	Jessica Eye	Decision (unanimous)	UFC 192	October 3, 2015	3	5:00	Houston, Texas, United States	Eye was deducted one point in round 2 due to an illegal knee.
Win	6–2	Milana Dudieva	TKO (punches and elbows)	UFC Fight Night: Mendes vs. Lamas	April 4, 2015	1	3:59	Fairfax, Virginia, United States	Performance of the Night.
Win	5–2	Jessica Rakoczy	TKO (punches)	The Ultimate Fighter: Team Rousey vs. Team Tate Finale	November 30, 2013	1	4:59	Las Vegas, Nevada, United States	Return to Bantamweight. Won The Ultimate Fighter 18 Bantamweight Tournament.
Loss	4–2	DeAnna Bennett	Decision (unanimous)	Showdown Fights 10	February 8, 2013	3	5:00	Orem, Utah, United States	Flyweight debut.
Loss	4–1	Sarah Moras	TKO (doctor stoppage)	ExciteFight: Conquest of the Cage 11	April 19, 2012	2	5:00	Airway Heights, Washington, United States	
Win	4–0	Rachael Swatez	Submission (guillotine choke)	ExciteFight: Conquest of the Cage 10	December 15, 2011	2	0:17	Airway Heights, Washington, United States	
Win	3–0	Stephanie Webber	Submission (armbar)	CageSport 8	December 5, 2009	2	2:54	Tacoma, Washington, United States	
Win	2–0	Robyn Dunne	TKO (punches)	International FC: Caged Combat	August 15, 2009	1	N/A	Penticton, British Columbia, Canada	Catchweight (110 lb) bout.
Win	1–0	Raylene Harvey	Submission (rear-naked choke)	ExciteFight: Spokane Fight Night 5	May 9, 2009	1	2:58	Spokane, Washington, United States	Bantamweight debut.

Exhibition record breakdown		
3 matches	3 wins	0 losses
By submission	2	0
By decision	1	0

Res.	Record	Opponent	Method	Event	Date	Round	Time	Location	Notes
Win	3–0	Sarah Moras	Submission (guillotine choke)	The Ultimate Fighter: Team Rousey vs. Team Tate	November 13, 2013 (air date)	2	3:31	Las Vegas, Nevada, United States	The Ultimate Fighter 18 semi-final.
Win	2–0	Shayna Baszler	Submission (rear-naked choke)	The Ultimate Fighter: Team Rousey vs. Team Tate	September 11, 2013 (air date)	2	3:07	Las Vegas, Nevada, United States	The Ultimate Fighter 18 preliminary round.
Win	1–0	Gina Mazany	Decision (unanimous)	The Ultimate Fighter: Team Rousey vs. Team Tate	September 4, 2013 (air date)	2	5:00	Las Vegas, Nevada, United States	The Ultimate Fighter 18 elimination round.

Amateur record breakdown		
2 matches	2 wins	0 losses
By knockout	1	0
By decision	1	0

Res.	Record	Opponent	Method	Event	Date	Round	Time	Location	Notes
Win	2–0	Cynthia Hernandez	TKO (submission to punch)	Northwest Fighting: Moses Lake Cage Fights 1	February 28, 2009	1	N/A	Moses Lake, Washington, United States	
Win	1–0	Kate Dell	Decision (unanimous)	ExciteFight: Spokane Fight Night 3	February 6, 2009	3	3:00	Spokane, Washington, United States	

== Pay-per-view bouts ==
No.	Event	Fight	Date	Venue	City	PPV Buys
1.	UFC 277	Peña vs. Nunes 2	July 30, 2022	American Airlines Center	Dallas, Texas, United States	Not Disclosed

== See also ==
- List of current UFC fighters
- List of female mixed martial artists

Awards and achievements
Preceded by Amanda Nunes	5th UFC Women's Bantamweight Champion; December 11, 2021 – July 30, 2022	Succeeded by Amanda Nunes
Preceded by Raquel Pennington	8th UFC Women's Bantamweight Champion; October 5, 2024 – June 7, 2025	Succeeded by Kayla Harrison
