= The Ultimate Fighter: A New World Champion =

UFC mixed martial arts television series and event in 2017

- Genre: Reality, Sports
- Created by: Craig Piligian, Frank Fertitta III, Lorenzo Fertitta, Dana White
- Starring: Dana White, Eddie Alvarez and Justin Gaethje
- Country of origin: United States

Production
- Running time: 60 minutes

Original release
- Network: Fox Sports 1
- Release: August 30 – November 29, 2017

The Ultimate Fighter 26 (also known as The Ultimate Fighter: A New World Champion) is an installment of the Ultimate Fighting Championship (UFC)-produced reality television series The Ultimate Fighter.

Tryouts were announced on May 3, scheduled for 20 days later. This season will exclusively feature the women's flyweight division, with the goal of crowning the UFC's inaugural 125-pound champion in the season's finale. All women who were currently on the UFC roster were allowed to submit their names for the tournament, as were females unsigned by the UFC.

The news came just months after UFC president Dana White told reporters in Las Vegas that the UFC had no plans to institute any further women's divisions in 2017 other than women's featherweight. It also canceled plans the UFC previously had to hold a TUF 26 casting call for women's strawweight, women's bantamweight, and men's middleweight.

The coaches for this season were announced on July 13, pitting former two-time Bellator Lightweight Champion and former UFC Lightweight Champion Eddie Alvarez against former WSOF Lightweight Champion Justin Gaethje. The cast was officially announced on August 5, including inaugural Invicta FC Flyweight Champion Barb Honchak, The Ultimate Fighter: Team Rousey vs. Team Tate contestant Roxanne Modafferi and former Invicta FC Bantamweight Champion and current UFC fighter Lauren Murphy.

== Cast ==
=== Coaches ===
Team Alvarez:

- Eddie Alvarez, Head Coach
- Mark Henry
- Zabit Magomedsharipov
- Marlon Moraes
- Corey Anderson
- Rich Pohler
Team Gaethje:
- Justin Gaethje, Head Coach
- Trevor Wittman
- Phil Nurse
- Matthew Lopez
- Luke Caudillo
- Jacob Ramos
- Vinny Magalhães
- Miesha Tate

 

=== Fighters ===
- Team Alvarez
  - Barb Honchak, Lauren Murphy, DeAnna Bennett, Melinda Fábián, Christina Marks, Ariel Beck, Sijara Eubanks, and Shana Dobson.
- Team Gaethje
  - Roxanne Modafferi, Maia Stevenson, Montana Stewart, Emily Whitmire, Rachael Ostovich-Berdon, Karine Gevorgyan, Nicco Montaño and Gillian Robertson.

== Episodes ==
Episode 1: A New World Champion (August 30, 2017)

- The season opens with a look back at preseason tryouts. A number of aspiring women's flyweight fighters gather in Las Vegas in the hopes of joining the cast in order to vie for the inaugural 125-pound belt in the UFC. UFC President Dana White discusses the tryouts, which attract more than 50 fighters from across the globe. White, along with matchmakers Sean Shelby and Mick Maynard, assess the athletes and decide on the 16 who will join the cast.
- The fighters arrive at the "TUF" gym, where they are greeted by head coaches former two-time Bellator Lightweight Champion and former UFC Lightweight Champion Eddie Alvarez and former WSOF Lightweight Champion Justin Gaethje, who are scheduled to fight at the end of the season. White summarizes the stakes of the tournament via a satellite message, and the competition is officially underway.
- The fighters change into training gear for coaches evaluations. Gaethje interviews each fighter on top of grappling and pad work sessions. He says his priority is to select those with mental toughness and durability. Alvarez, meanwhile, has the fighters engage in a much more physical level of sparring. He wants to see the talent firsthand in a live-fight scenario and admits to being "shocked" by the level of talent on the cast.
- At the conclusion of evaluations, Alvarez and Gaethje have the traditional coin toss to determine which team has the first fighter pick and which selects the first matchup. Alvarez wins the coin toss, and decides to pick the first fighter.
- Since the fighters have been seeded by the UFC for the tournament (which was unknown to the coaches), as a coach makes a pick, the corresponding fighter based on seed will go to the other coach (e.g., if the #1 seeded fighter is picked by a coach, the #16 seeded fighter will go to the other coach).
- The eight coaches' picks (and corresponding seed sent to the other team):

Barb Honchak – Ranked #2 (Team Alvarez – first pick)
Gillian Robertson – Ranked #15 (Team Gaethje)

Roxanne Modafferi – Ranked #1 (Team Gaethje – second pick)
Shana Dobson – Ranked #16 (Team Alvarez)

Lauren Murphy – Ranked #3 (Team Alvarez – third pick)
Nicco Montaño – Ranked #14 (Team Gaethje)

Rachael Ostovich-Berdon – Ranked #10 (Team Gaethje – fourth pick)
Melinda Fábián – Ranked #7 (Team Alvarez)

Sijara Eubanks – Ranked #12 (Team Alvarez – fifth pick)
Maia Stevenson – Ranked #5 (Team Gaethje)

Montana Stewart – Ranked #6 (Team Gaethje – sixth pick)
Ariel Beck – Ranked #11 (Team Alvarez)

DeAnna Bennett – Ranked #4 (Team Alvarez – seventh pick)
Karine Gevorgyan – Ranked #13 (Team Gaethje)

Emily Whitmire – Ranked #8 (Team Gaethje – eight pick)
Christina Marks – Ranked #9 (Team Alvarez)

- Gaethje announces the first fight: #1 Roxanne Modafferi vs. #16 Shana Dobson.
- The fighters then visit the "TUF" house for the first time. A few of the athletes are awestruck by house and platform they are about to compete on. The intensity and focus is high as the fighters settle into their new living area.
- Modafferi, who is the first female to ever make two appearances on the "TUF" reality series, is eager to make up for a poor effort on Season 18. She was eliminated in the first round, but has since excelled under the Invicta FC banner and wants to prove to the world that she doesn’t "suck anymore."
- At the first Team Alvarez training session, the coaching staff beings to work with Dobson, who is a sizable underdog to Modafferi with just three career fights. She calls herself the "best kept secret in MMA," and coach Alvarez says the key to victory is to keep the fight standing.
- Team Gaethje has its first training session, and right off the bat coach Gaethje brings in a special assistant coach. Former Strikeforce and UFC Women's Bantamweight Champion Miesha Tate enters the gym. Tate was Modafferi's coach on Season 18, and gives her some motivational words.
- Roxanne Modafferi defeated Shana Dobson via TKO (elbows) in the first round.
- Alvarez announces the next match up: #4 DeAnna Bennett vs. #13 Karine Gevorgyan.

Episode 2: Fight! (September 6, 2017)

- After Roxanne Modafferi's win, Justin Gaethje and his assistant coaches visit the TUF house to celebrate her victory and they treat the whole team to a sushi dinner and playing games.
- Justin has a hard time communicating with Karine Gevorgyan, who only knows a few words in English. He even uses her translator to describe techniques in preparation for her upcoming fight. But Karine feels left out being the only fighter from Armenia in the house.
- During Team Gaethje's grappling session, Emily Whitmore injures herself, thinking that her rib popped out, and has to go to the hospital. UFC medical consultant Dr. Jeffrey Davidson diagnoses it as an intercostal muscle or cartilage strain to her rib area, nothing too serious that she can't fight in a few weeks.
- Team Alvarez sees the new bracket board on the wall and the ladies now have in their heads if they win, they will fight a teammate, so Eddie Alvarez has to bring his team back together again.
- DeAnna Bennett defeated Karine Gevorgyan via TKO (punches) in the first round.
- Gaethje announces the next match up: #6 Montana Stewart vs. #11 Ariel Beck.

Episode 3: Time to Shine (September 13, 2017)

- Both teams visit the new UFC Performance Institute, a state-of-the-art training and wellness facility. They take advantage of their advanced equipment and technology. While there, Emily Whitmire gets her injured ribs checked out by the director of physical therapy, Heather Linden who uses compression tape and laser therapy to stabilize the pain.
- Stressed about her upcoming fight, Ariel Beck suffers a panic attack during her training session, but she bounces back.
- Team Gaethje gets dress up for a night out on the town when Gaethje takes them out to go bowling. To get into a competitive mindset, Gaethje sets up a contest between his team with a cash prize: Montana Stewart and Emily Whitmire team up and win the first prize of $200 and third prize with $100, and Rachael Ostovich-Berdon gets second prize with $150.
- Montana Stewart defeated Ariel Beck via submission (D'Arce choke) in the first round.
- Alvarez announces the next match up: #3 Lauren Murphy vs. #14 Nicco Montaño.

Episode 4: The Truth in Me (September 20, 2017)

- Nicco Montaño defeated Lauren Murphy via unanimous decision after two rounds.
- Gaethje announces the next match up: #5 Maia Stevenson vs. #12 Sijara Eubanks.

Episode 5: Feelings Mean Nothing (September 27, 2017)

- After her defeat, Lauren Murphy doesn't take losing lightly. She doesn't feel mentally and physically ready for practice and decides to skip morning training. Eddie Alvarez doesn't like her reaction, thinking she's being selfish and she's going to bring down the spirit and the morale of his team. Lauren disagrees and just needed a couple of hours to deal with her loss her way.
- Maia Stevenson gets in her own head about why she was picked for the show; because her husband his TUF 2 winner and former UFC fighter Joe "Daddy" Stevenson. But her team assures her she got here on her own merits because of her MMA skills.
- In order to make weight for her upcoming fight, Sijara Eubanks cuts her dreadlocks so she can lose the half a pound she needed to make weight at 125.
- Sijara Eubanks defeated Maia Stevenson via submission (kimura) in the second round.
- Alvarez announces the next match up: #2 Barb Honchak vs. #15 Gillian Robertson.

Episode 6: Predator (October 4, 2017)

- Barb Honchak defeated Gillian Robertson via TKO (punches and elbows) in the second round.
- Gaethje announces the next match up: #7 Melinda Fábián vs. #10 Rachael Ostovich-Berdon.

Episode 7: Enjoy the Moment (October 18, 2017)

- Dana Whites surprise visits the women at TUF house to give them some motivation about signing with the UFC. A few fighters check out the features in his BMW M760i, one of 12 in the U.S.
- Rachael Ostovich-Berdon defeated Melinda Fábián via submission (rear-naked choke) in the first round.
- Gaethje announces the next match up: #8 Emily Whitmire vs. #9 Christina Marks.

Episode 8: Sink or Swim (November 1, 2017)

- After a tough loss she can't forget, Lauren Murphy is unhappy on Team Alvarez and resents Eddie on how he handled training leading up to her fight. She decides to train with Team Gaethje and the fighters and coaches welcome her. However, Eddie is personally insulted since he feels he has the credentials and the best coaches for his fighters. After Lauren calmly tells him about her joining the "Blue Team", Eddie goes on a tirade about it to his team and even gets Lauren's name wrong, calling her "Barb" and said "she lost". She even made him a thank you card and he refused to take it; his feelings were hurt.
- Meisha Tate is back in town and helps her teammate Emily Whitmire with mending her injured ribs with a device called the Mac Pro. Meisha will also corner Emily's fight.
- Eddie and Justin compete in the coaches challenge. This year's contest is swimming; Olympic Freestyle 50 meters (the length of 8 football fields). They must swim back and forth 16 time and must touch the swimming pool wall on both sides. The first coach to do it wins $10,000 and their team wins $1,500 each. Justin sets out on a fast pace while Eddie just takes his time. A quarter a way through, Justin gasses out and Eddie pulls ahead, winning the competition. Since Lauren left the "Green Team", the fighters took home $1,700.
- Emily Whitmire defeated Christina Marks via verbal submission (armbar) in the first round.
- Alvarez and Gaethje announce the quarterfinal match ups:

#1 Roxanne Modafferi vs. #8 Emily Whitmire.
#12 Sijara Eubanks vs. #4 Deanna Bennett.
#2 Barb Honchak vs. #10 Rachael Ostovich-Berdin.
#6 Montana Stewart vs. #14 Nicco Montaño.

Episode 9: The Fight Gods (November 8, 2017)

- So impressed with the preliminary fights, Dana White wants the women to relax and take their minds off fighting and decides to send them on a night cruise of Lake Las Vegas on La Contessa for some dinner and drinks.
- Roxanne Modafferi defeated Emily Whitmire via TKO (elbows) in the first round.
- During the second fight weigh-in, Sijara is a quarter pound overweight and has an hour to make weight. Meanwhile, Lauren Murphy seizes the opportunity to fight in her place by taking Sijara's sauna time, much to Alvarez's annoyance. However, Sijara makes the weight cut.
- Sijara Eubanks defeated Deanna Bennett via KO (head kick) in the first round.

Episode 10: Make it a Fight (November 15, 2017)

- Barb Honchak defeated Rachael Ostovich-Berdin via unanimous decision in the second round.
- Nicco Montaño defeated Montana Stewart via unanimous decision in the second round.

Episode 11: A Will to Win (November 22, 2017)

- While both teams train at the UFC Performance Institute, Eddie decides to play a prank on Justin since he left his car keys unattended. Eddie moves Justin's SUV and parks it in the lot closest to the highway up on the curb.
- Justin gets his revenge on Eddie when he counter pranks him by lifting Eddie's SUV 15 feet off the ground via crane, writing "Team Gaethje" and "I Love Justin" on the windows, and also shooting the bottom of it with silly string.
- Nicco Montaño defeated Barb Honchak via Unanimous Decision in the third round.

Episode 12: The Ultimate Goal (November 29, 2017)

- Constantly struggling to make weight before her fights, Sijara Eubanks gets help from the nutritionists at the UFC Performance Institute.
- Sijara Eubanks defeated Roxanne Modafferi via Unanimous Decision in the third round.
- Sijara moves on to the TUF 26 Finale to face Nicco Montaño.

== Tournament bracket ==
Round of 16
1 Roxanne Modafferi	TKO
16 Shana Dobson	1
8 Emily Whitmire	SUB
9 Christina Marks	1
5 Maia Stevenson	2
12 Sijara Eubanks	SUB
4 DeAnna Bennett	TKO
13 Karine Gevorgyan	1
2 Barb Honchak	TKO
15 Gillian Robertson	2
7 Melinda Fábián	1
10 Rachael Ostovich-Berdon	SUB
6 Montana Stewart	SUB
11 Ariel Beck	1
3 Lauren Murphy	2
14 Nicco Montaño	UD

Quarter-finals
1 Roxanne Modafferi	TKO
8 Emily Whitmire	1
12 Sijara Eubanks	KO
4 DeAnna Bennett	1
2 Barb Honchak	UD
10 Rachael Ostovich-Berdon	2
6 Montana Stewart	2
14 Nicco Montaño	UD

Semi-finals
1 Roxanne Modafferi	3
12 Sijara Eubanks	UD
2 Barb Honchak	3
14 Nicco Montaño	UD

Final
1 Roxanne Modafferi*	5
14 Nicco Montaño	UD

* Eubanks was pulled from the tournament finale on the day of the weigh ins for medical reasons. She was replaced by Roxanne Modafferi.

Legend
	Team Alvarez
	Team Gaethje
UD	Unanimous Decision
MD	Majority Decision
SUB	Submission
(T)KO	(Technical) Knock Out

== The Ultimate Fighter 26 Finale ==
The Ultimate Fighter: A New World Champion Finale
- The poster for The Ultimate Fighter: A New World Champion Finale
- Promotion: Ultimate Fighting Championship
- Date: December 1, 2017
- Venue: Park Theater
- City: Paradise, Nevada
- Attendance: 2,798

Event chronology
UFC Fight Night: Bisping vs. Gastelum	The Ultimate Fighter: A New World Champion Finale	UFC 218: Holloway vs. Aldo 2

The Ultimate Fighter 26 Finale (also known as The Ultimate Fighter: A New World Champion Finale) was a mixed martial arts event produced by the Ultimate Fighting Championship that was held on December 1, 2017, at Park Theater in Paradise, Nevada, part of the Las Vegas metropolitan area.

Sijara Eubanks was expected to face Nicco Montaño in the finals of the season to determine the inaugural UFC Women's Flyweight Champion. However, on the day of weigh ins, Eubanks was ruled medically ineligible for the card after a visit to the hospital overnight for allegedly miscalculating her weight cut and suffering kidney failure, which led promotion officials to replace her with semifinalist Roxanne Modafferi, whom Eubanks defeated on the show.

A women's flyweight bout between promotional newcomer Priscila Cachoeira and former Invicta FC Bantamweight Champion Lauren Murphy was expected to take place at the event. However, the pairing never materialized due to alleged visa issues for Cachoeira. Murphy still weighed in as an alternate for any bout at the event and was then booked against former Invicta FC Flyweight Champion Barb Honchak, who was left without an opponent after her scheduled opponent Modafferi was pulled in favor of the main event.

At the weigh ins, Karine Gevorgyan weighed in at 130 pounds, 4 pounds over the flyweight non-title fight upper limit of 126 pounds. As such, the bout proceeded at a catchweight and Gevorgyan forfeited 30% of her purse to her opponent Rachael Ostovich.

=== Results ===
Main Card (Fox Sports 1)
Weight class				Method	Round	Time	Notes
Women's Flyweight	Nicco Montaño	def.	Roxanne Modafferi	Decision (unanimous) (50–45, 49–46, 49–46)	5	5:00	(Note: For the inaugural UFC Women's Flyweight Championship.)
Bantamweight	Sean O'Malley	def.	Terrion Ware	Decision (unanimous) (29–28, 29–28, 29–28)	3	5:00
Women's Flyweight	Lauren Murphy	def.	Barb Honchak	Decision (split) (29–28, 28–29, 29–28)	3	5:00
Middleweight	Gerald Meerschaert	def.	Eric Spicely	TKO (body kick)	2	2:18
Women's Flyweight	DeAnna Bennett	vs.	Melinda Fábián	Draw (majority) (29–27, 28–28, 28–28)	3	5:00	(Note: Fábián was deducted one point in the second round for grabbing the fence)
Bantamweight	Brett Johns	def.	Joe Soto	Submission (calf slicer)	1	0:30
Preliminary Card (Fox Sports 1)
Women's Flyweight	Montana De La Rosa	def.	Christina Marks	Submission (armbar)	1	2:00
Middleweight	Ryan Janes	def.	Andrew Sanchez	TKO (punches)	3	0:58
Women's Catchweight (130 lb)	Rachael Ostovich	def.	Karine Gevorgyan	Submission (armbar)	1	1:40
Women's Flyweight	Shana Dobson	def.	Ariel Beck	TKO (punches)	2	2:53
Preliminary Card (UFC Fight Pass)
Women's Flyweight	Gillian Robertson	def.	Emily Whitmire	Submission (armbar)	1	2:12

=== Bonus awards ===
The following fighters were awarded $50,000 bonuses:

- Fight of the Night: Nicco Montaño vs. Roxanne Modafferi
- Performance of the Night: Gerald Meerschaert and Brett Johns

=== Reported payout ===
The following is the reported payout to the fighters as reported to the Nevada State Athletic Commission. It does not include sponsor money and also does not include the UFC's traditional "fight night" bonuses. The total disclosed payout for the event was $553,000.

- Nicco Montaño: $100,000 (no win bonus) def. Roxanne Modafferi: $100,000
- Sean O'Malley: $20,000 (includes $10,000 win bonus) def. Terrion Ware: $10,000
- Lauren Murphy: $20,000 (includes $10,000 win bonus) def. Barb Honchak: $10,000
- Gerald Meerschaert: $28,000 (includes $14,000 win bonus) def. Eric Spicely: $14,000
- DeAnna Bennett: $10,000 drew with. Melinda Fábián: $10,000 ^
- Brett Johns: $28,000 (includes $14,000 win bonus) def. Joe Soto: $31,000
- Montana De La Rosa: $20,000 (includes $10,000 win bonus) def. Christina Marks: $10,000
- Ryan Janes: $24,000 (includes $12,000 win bonus) def. Andrew Sanchez: $28,000
- Rachel Ostovich-Berdon: $23,000 (includes $10,000 win bonus) def. Karine Gevorgyan: $7,000 ^^
- Shana Dobson: $20,000 (includes $10,000 win bonus) def. Ariel Beck: $10,000
- Gillian Robertson: $20,000 (includes $10,000 win bonus) def. Emily Whitmire: $10,000

^ Both fighters earned show money; bout declared majority draw.
^^ Karine Gevorgyan was fined 30 percent of her purse ($3,000) for failing to make the required weight for her fight with Rachel Ostovich-Berdon. That money was issued to Ostovich-Berdon, an NSAC official confirmed.

== Coaches' Fight ==
UFC 218: Holloway vs. Aldo 2 was held on December 2, 2017, at Little Caesars Arena in Detroit, Michigan.

- Lightweight bout: Eddie Alvarez vs. Justin Gaethje

Eddie Alvarez defeated Justin Gaethje via KO (knee and punches) at 3:59 of the third round.

== See also ==
- The Ultimate Fighter
- List of current UFC fighters
- List of UFC events
- 2017 in UFC
