= Rachael Ostovich =

American mixed martial arts fighter

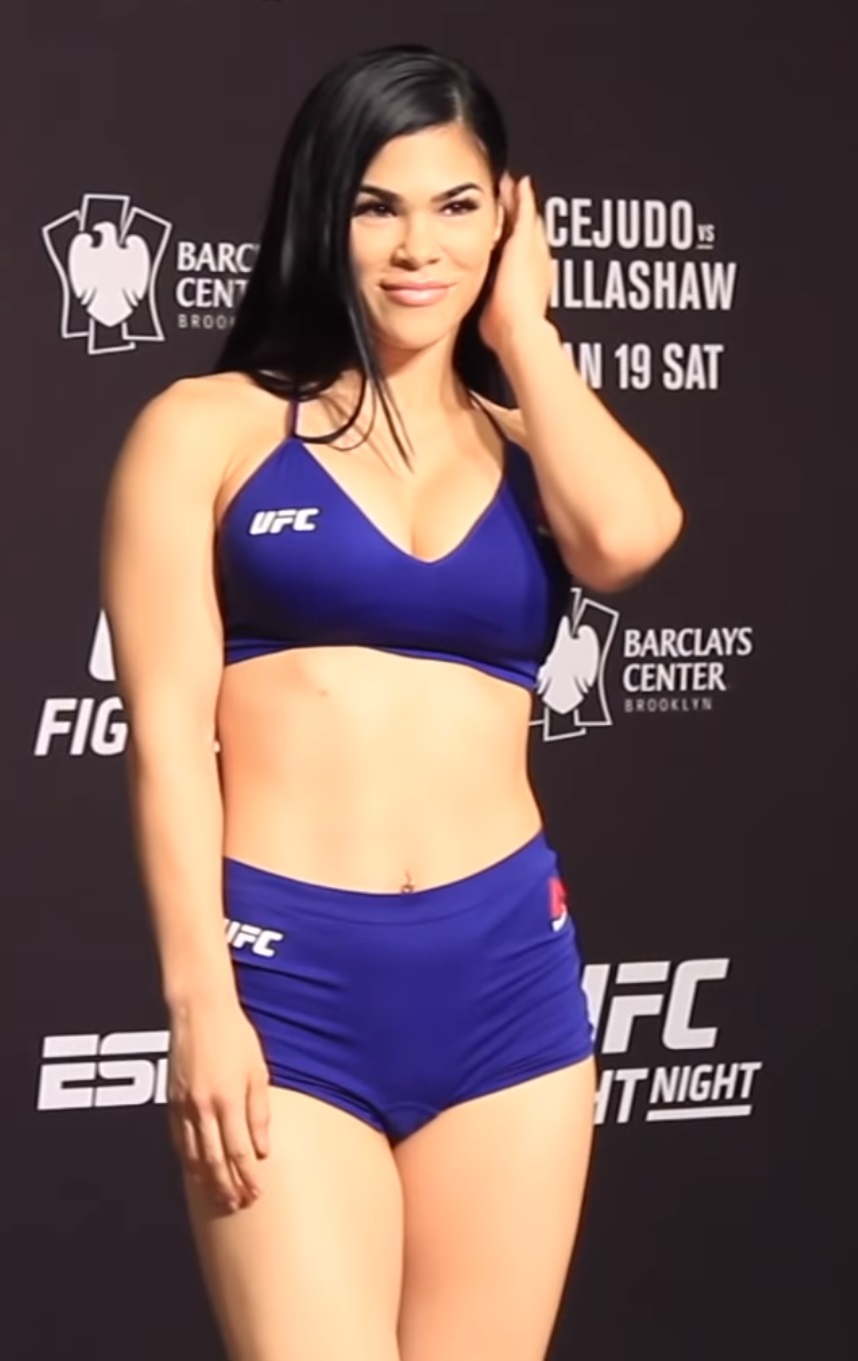
- Ostovich poses after weigh-in for UFC on ESPN+ 1 in 2019
- Born: Rachael Ostovich; February 25, 1991 (age 35); Hawaii, United States
- Height: 5 ft 3 in (1.60 m)
- Weight: 125 lb (57 kg; 8.9 st)
- Division: Flyweight
- Reach: 62 in (157 cm)
- Style: Boxing, Judo
- Team: Jesus Is Lord

Mixed martial arts record
- Total: 10
- Wins: 4
- By submission: 2
- By decision: 2
- Losses: 6
- By knockout: 3
- By submission: 3

Amateur record
- Total: 6
- Wins: 6
- By knockout: 2
- By submission: 1
- By decision: 3

Other information
- Mixed martial arts record from Sherdog

Rachael Ostovich (born February 25, 1991) is an American mixed martial artist who competes in the Flyweight division. A professional since 2014, she has competed in the UFC and Invicta Fighting Championships. After being released from the UFC, she made her debut for Bare Knuckle Fighting Championship in 2021.

== Background ==
Ostovich attended Moanalua High School and competed in cheerleading, judo, and wrestling. She began wrestling at 7 years of age, followed by cheerleading after seeing Bring It On, and judo in the off-season. She became team captain for all three sports in high school. Ostovich placed third at the 2008 HHSAA judo state championships, and placed first in 2009. She also placed first in the state for cheerleading, and third for wrestling.

Ostovich was a mixed martial arts (MMA) fan from childhood, citing her father Robert "Bob-O" Ostovich and Gina Carano as inspirations. Her father is a former professional fighter, trainer, and promoter. Her brother Robby is also a professional fighter. She trains out of her family's gym, Jesus Is Lord. Ostovich originally began training for MMA because she wanted to continue competing in sports after high school.

== Mixed martial arts career ==
=== Early career ===
Ostovich began her amateur MMA career in 2010. Over the next three years, she compiled an amateur MMA record of 6–0, winning the 808 Battle Ground bantamweight championship, Destiny flyweight and bantamweight championships.

Ostovich made her professional MMA debut in January 2014 in her native Hawaii. She went 1–1 before joining Invicta Fighting Championships

=== Invicta FC ===
Ostovich debuted for the all-female Invicta Fighting Championships in December 2014. She faced Evva Johnson at Invicta FC 10 and won the fight by split decision.

In her second bout for the promotion, Ostovich faced Andrea Lee on September 12, 2015, at Invicta FC 14. She lost the bout via verbal submission to an armbar in the third round.

In her third bout for the promotion, Ostovich faced Ariel Beck on May 7, 2016, at Invicta FC 17. She won the bout via a split decision.

In her fourth fight for the promotion, Ostovich faced Christine Ferea on January 14, 2017, at Invicta FC 21. She lost the fight via TKO in the third round, bringing her Invicta FC record to 2–2 before joining The Ultimate Fighter.

=== The Ultimate Fighter ===
In August 2017, it was announced that Ostovich would be one of the fighters featured on The Ultimate Fighter 26, where the process to crown the UFC's inaugural 125-pound women's champion will take place. In the opening round, Ostovich defeated Melinda Fábián by rear-naked choke submission. In the quarterfinals, she faced Barb Honchak and lost the bout via unanimous decision.

=== Ultimate Fighting Championship ===
Ostovich faced Karine Gevorgyan on December 1, 2017, at The Ultimate Fighter 26 Finale. She won the fight via armbar submission in the first round.

Ostovich faced Montana De La Rosa on July 6, 2018, at The Ultimate Fighter 27 Finale. She lost the fight via rear-naked choke in round three.

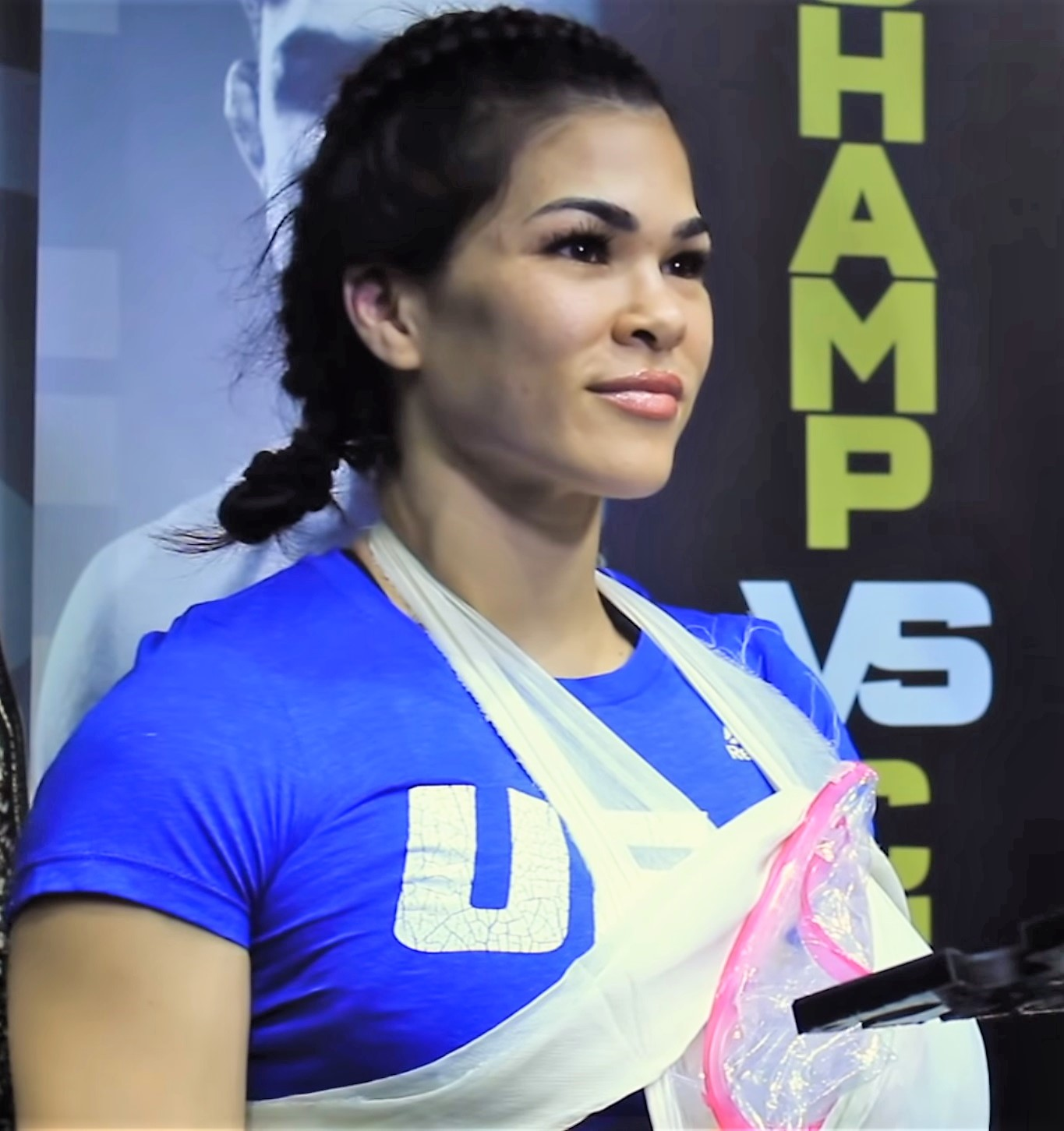
Ostovich interviewed after defeat at UFC on ESPN+ 1 in 2019. Her arm is in a sling from the armbar.

Ostovich was scheduled to face Paige VanZant on January 19, 2019, at UFC on ESPN+ 1. It was reported on November 18, 2018, that Ostovich was violently assaulted, sustaining a broken orbital bone and other injuries, and due to the injuries she sustained, she pulled out from the fight against VanZant. On November 27, the bout between Ostovich and VanZant was confirmed to push through on January 19, 2019, after Ostovich was cleared to fight by her doctor. Ostovich lost the fight by submission via armbar in the second round.

Ostovich was scheduled to face Veronica Macedo on August 10, 2019, at UFC on ESPN+ 14, but Ostovich was replaced by Polyana Viana for unknown reasons.

Ostovich was scheduled to face Shana Dobson at UFC Fight Night 168 in Auckland, New Zealand on February 23, 2020. However, Ostovich was removed from the bout due to testing positive for ostarine, and she was replaced by Priscila Cachoeira. On June 18, it was announced that Ostovich had accepted a USADA suspension for one year due to testing positive for ostarine, retroactive to January 3, 2020.

Ostovich tested positive for Ostarine and GW1516 on January 3, 2020, and she was suspended by USADA for eight months. The prohibited substance was found in one of her supplements and was not listed on the supplement label.

Ostovich faced Gina Mazany on November 28, 2020, at UFC on ESPN: Blaydes vs. Lewis. She lost the fight via third round TKO from body kicks.

After 3 straight losses, Ostovich was released by the UFC on December 7, 2020.

== Bare-knuckle boxing ==
On April 27, 2021, Ostovich and Bare Knuckle Fighting Championship both announced that she had signed with the organization and is expected to make her debut in July. On May 27, 2021, it was announced that Ostovich is scheduled to face Paige VanZant – to whom she lost in mixed martial arts at UFC Fight Night: Cejudo vs. Dillashaw – at BKFC 19 on July 23, 2021. She won the bout via unanimous decision. This fight earned her the Fight of the Night award.

== Personal life ==
=== Domestic violence ===
On November 18, 2018, Ostovich was assaulted in her hometown of Honolulu, leaving her with a broken orbital bone. The perpetrator is alleged to be her husband, Arnold Berdon, who is also an MMA fighter. Ostovich filed and was granted a temporary restraining order against her husband effective until May 19, 2019. Berdon was arrested on November 20, 2018, for second-degree assault (felony) and he was released on a bond of $75,000. The case was investigated by the Honolulu Police Department. A nine-minute video taken by a witness and obtained by Hawaii News Now captures Berdon repeatedly saying "I’m going to murder you. I’m going to fucking murder you," and Ostovich’s cries for help. On December 20, 2018, Berdon plead not guilty in connection with the case. The trial's next hearing was in March 2019, where Berdon pleaded no contest on the case.

After a night out with family, (Arnold Berdon) punched me repeatedly on the head, face, ribs, making me fall to the ground. I gasped for breath and escaped thru [sic] balcony. I coughed up blood, threw up sev. [sic] times. Cracked orbital.

The sentencing took place on May 16, 2019, in a Honolulu court and Berdon was sentenced to four-year probation in a domestic assault. Ostovich's divorce decree was filed with full custody of their six-year-old daughter.

== Championships and accomplishments ==
=== Bare-knuckle boxing ===
- Bare Knuckle Fighting Championship
  - Fight of the Night (One time) vs. Paige VanZant

== Mixed martial arts record ==
Professional record breakdown
| 10 matches | 4 wins | 6 losses |
| By knockout | 0 | 3 |
| By submission | 2 | 3 |
| By decision | 2 | 0 |

| Res. | Record | Opponent | Method | Event | Date | Round | Time | Location | Notes |
|---|---|---|---|---|---|---|---|---|---|
| Loss | 4–6 | Gina Mazany | KO (body kick) | UFC on ESPN: Smith vs. Clark | November 28, 2020 | 3 | 4:10 | Las Vegas, Nevada, United States | |
| Loss | 4–5 | Paige VanZant | Submission (armbar) | UFC Fight Night: Cejudo vs. Dillashaw | January 19, 2019 | 2 | 1:50 | Brooklyn, New York, United States | |
| Loss | 4–4 | Montana De La Rosa | Submission (rear-naked choke) | The Ultimate Fighter: Undefeated Finale | July 6, 2018 | 3 | 4:21 | Las Vegas, Nevada, United States | |
| Win | 4–3 | Karine Gevorgyan | Submission (armbar) | The Ultimate Fighter: A New World Champion Finale | December 1, 2017 | 1 | 1:40 | Las Vegas, Nevada, United States | Catchweight (130 lb) bout; Gevorgyan missed weight. |
| Loss | 3–3 | Christine Ferea | TKO (head kick and punches) | Invicta FC 21: Anderson vs. Tweet | January 14, 2017 | 3 | 1:29 | Kansas City, Missouri, United States | |
| Win | 3–2 | Ariel Beck | Decision (split) | Invicta FC 17: Evinger vs. Schneider | May 7, 2016 | 3 | 5:00 | Costa Mesa, California, United States | Fight of the Night. |
| Loss | 2–2 | Andrea Lee | Submission (armbar) | Invicta FC 14: Evinger vs. Kianzad | September 12, 2015 | 3 | 4:58 | Kansas City, Missouri, United States | |
| Win | 2–1 | Evva Johnson | Decision (split) | Invicta FC 10: Waterson vs. Tiburcio | December 5, 2014 | 3 | 5:00 | Houston, Texas, United States | |
| Win | 1–1 | Misha Nassiri | Submission (armbar) | X-1: Jara vs. Vitale | September 26, 2014 | 3 | N/A | Honolulu, Hawaii, United States | |
| Loss | 0–1 | Jenny Liou Shriver | TKO (knee to the body and punches) | Destiny MMA Na Koa 4 | January 25, 2014 | 2 | N/A | Honolulu, Hawaii, United States | |

| Exhibition record breakdown | | |
| 2 matches | 1 win | 1 loss |
| By submission | 1 | 0 |
| By decision | 0 | 1 |

| Res. | Record | Opponent | Method | Event | Date | Round | Time | Location | Notes |
|---|---|---|---|---|---|---|---|---|---|
| Loss | 1–1 | Barb Honchak | Decision (unanimous) | The Ultimate Fighter: A New World Champion | November 15, 2017 (air date) | 2 | 5:00 | Las Vegas, Nevada, United States | TUF 26 Quarter-Finals. |
| Win | 1–0 | Melinda Fábián | Submission (rear-naked choke) | The Ultimate Fighter: A New World Champion | October 18, 2017 (air date) | 1 | 4:22 | Las Vegas, Nevada, United States | TUF 26 preliminary round. |

== Bare knuckle boxing record ==
Professional record breakdown
| 1 match | 1 win | 0 losses |
| By decision | 1 | 0 |

| Res. | Record | Opponent | Method | Event | Date | Round | Time | Location | Notes |
|---|---|---|---|---|---|---|---|---|---|
| Win | 1–0 | Paige VanZant | Decision (unanimous) | BKFC 19 | July 23, 2021 | 5 | 2:00 | Tampa, Florida, United States | Fight of the Night. |
