= Melinda Fábián =

Hungarian mixed martial artist

- Born: June 25, 1987 (age 39); Tatabánya, Hungarian People's Republic (now Hungary)
- Nationality: Hungarian
- Height: 5 ft 6 in (1.68 m)
- Weight: 125 lb (57 kg; 8.9 st)
- Division: Flyweight (2015, 2016–present); Bantamweight (2016)
- Reach: 66 in (168 cm)
- Style: Kenpo Karate, Boxing, Kickboxing, Brazilian Jiu-Jitsu
- Fighting out of: Budapest, Hungary
- Team: Budapest Top Team; Ares Independent Jiu Jitsu Hungary
- Trainer: Striking: Ferenc Peszlen; Grappling: Dávid Keszler; Wrestling: István Veréb
- Rank: 2nd dan Black belt in Kempo Karate; Brown belt in Shotokan Karate; Blue belt in Brazilian Jiu-Jitsu under Milton Bastos
- Years active: 2015–present (MMA)

Mixed martial arts record
- Total: 11
- Wins: 5
- By knockout: 1
- By submission: 4
- Losses: 4
- By submission: 2
- By decision: 2
- Draws: 2

Other information
- Mixed martial arts record from Sherdog

Melinda Fábián (born June 25, 1987) is a Hungarian mixed martial artist. She was the first Hungarian to compete in the UFC. She is also the inaugural women's bantamweight world champion in Karate Combat.

== Background ==
Born in 1987, Melinda Fábián first started fighting martial arts at the age of 12, starting to shotokan karate at Vértesszőlős where she reached the brown belt. She then made her way to Stockholm, where, besides karate, she became acquainted with Muay Thai. She returned home in 2006 and started her favorite martial art, which she liked as a kenpo karate the Kurayfat campsite. A year later, she had already won a silver medal at the World Championships in Home Affairs as a blue belt. And in 2013, at the World Championships, also home to the podium, she was the winner of the full contact and knockdown rules, with a black belt at her waist. Melinda loves Kenpo karate so much that she runs her own club, Sakura Doyo. After finding great success at the campsite, Melinda set out on mixed martial arts, which was less well known in Hungary at the time. In this style, ground combat plays the same role as standing, so wrestling and Brazilian jiu-jitsu are at the forefront, as evidenced in Melinda's victories.

== Personal life ==
Fábián had a date and relationship with her Head Coach Ferenc "Rendes" Peszlen.

== Mixed martial career ==
=== Early career ===
The blonde lady first entered the cage at HFC 09 in 2015 as the only Hungarian female warrior in a quad tournament in front of a domestic audience. In the opening match, he had a straight-up victory in the first round, but she got exactly the same technique from her more experienced American opponent in the final. Nevertheless, according to Melinda, her lack of routine was the only drawback with the other fighters. In the next 3 games, she ended with one draw, one win (Ezekiel choke) and one with a split scoring defeat.

The defeat was followed by a two-match winning streak (brace, ankle strain), both knocking in the first round. (Interestingly, although Melinda is basically the strength of the stand-up fight, she has achieved all her victories by forcing and has never been knocked out.) Unfortunately, after two quick wins, a defeat slipped, but that did not stop her from winning. The Hungarian girl was to get the big chance of her life from UFC and finally show herself outside the old continent.

=== The Ultimate Fighter ===
She has been invited to The Ultimate Fighter UFC reality show and the winner sometimes gets a UFC contract at the end of the show. And the stake in the 26th TUF season was nothing but the winner becoming the champion of the newly introduced women's weight (57 kg) division. Melinda – who sold her car to buy a plane ticket overseas – joined Eddie Alvarez in the selection. (Eddie Alvarez is a former lightweight champion of Bellator and the UFC.)

Unfortunately, Melinda had an injury during the show, which put her mark on her training and preparation for the game. In the show, every warrior has a homemade video in which Melinda introduces Budapest, her apartment and talks about her team the Budapest Top Team. Her opponent, Rachael Ostovich, is a Hawaiian-born girl with a warrior background, with a balance of 3–3 (Melinda's 4–3–1). At the start of the match, the Hungarian girl worked well in stand-up combat but was unable to defend Rachael's grounding and gave up her back with an unfortunate move and the American took the opportunity and pulled in the back throttle after some submission attempts and some ground-and-pound and victory.

=== Ultimate Fighting Championship ===
Fábián faced DeAnna Bennett on December 1, 2017, at The Ultimate Fighter: A New World Champion#The Ultimate Fighter 26 Finale. The fight ended as a majority draw and Bennett was subsequently released from the promotion.

Her second fight came on June 23, 2018, at UFC Fight Night: Cerrone vs. Edwards against Ji Yeon Kim. She lost the fight via split decision.

On August 11, 2018, it was reported that Fábián was released by the UFC.

=== Post UFC career ===
Fábián faced Karla Benitez on October 22, 2019, at The Cage Fighting Komarno 7. She won the fight via knockout.

== Karate Combat career ==
On November 23, 2020, Melinda Fábián made her debut in the Karate Combat organization, where she defeated Brazilian fighter Ana Luiza Ferreira Da Silva by unanimous decision in a three-round bout.

On April 1, 2023, she won her second Karate Combat fight, once again by unanimous decision, this time against Brazilian fighter Erica Santos.

On December 15, 2023, at a gala event held in Las Vegas, Melinda Fábián won by technical knockout against Venezuelan fighter Omaira Molina, becoming the organization's first women's bantamweight world champion.

== Titles and accomplishments ==
=== Kempo ===
- 2007 World Kempo Championships Blue Belt (silver)
- 2013 World Kempo Championships Full Contact (gold)
- 2013 World Kempo Championships Knockdown (gold)

=== Ultimate Fighting Championship (UFC) ===
- First Hungarian fighter to compete in the UFC

=== Karate Combat ===
- 2023 Karate Combat Bantamweight Champion

== Mixed martial arts record ==
Professional record breakdown
| 11 matches | 5 wins | 4 losses |
| By knockout | 1 | 0 |
| By submission | 4 | 2 |
| By decision | 0 | 2 |
| Draws | 2 | |

| Res. | Record | Opponent | Method | Event | Date | Round | Time | Location | Notes |
|---|---|---|---|---|---|---|---|---|---|
| Win | 5–4–2 | Karla Benitez | KO (head kick) | Cage Fighting Komarno 7 | October 2, 2019 | 3 | 4:59 | Győr, Hungary | |
| Loss | 4–4–2 | Kim Ji-yeon | Decision (split) | UFC Fight Night: Cowboy vs. Edwards | June 23, 2018 | 3 | 5:00 | Kallang, Singapore | |
| Draw | 4–3–2 | DeAnna Bennett | Draw (Majority) | The Ultimate Fighter: A New World Champion Finale | December 1, 2017 | 3 | 5:00 | Las Vegas, Nevada, United States | Fábián was deducted one point in round 2 due to grabbing the fence. |
| Loss | 4–3–1 | Judith Ruis | Submission (guillotine choke) | Aggrelin 16: MIA Cage Fight | February 2, 2017 | 1 | 4:30 | Munich, Germany | |
| Win | 4–2–1 | Monic Bilicsi | Submission (straight ankle lock) | Aggrelin 15 | December 18, 2016 | 1 | 0:14 | Nurnberg, Germany | |
| Win | 3–2–1 | Tímea Nyistor | Submission (armbar) | Cage Fighting Komárno 1 | November 5, 2016 | 1 | 0:38 | Komárno, Slovakia | Return to Flyweight. |
| Loss | 2–2–1 | Lucie Pudilová | Decision (split) | GCF 34: Back in The Fight 5 | March 25, 2016 | 5 | 5:00 | Příbram, Czech Republic | For the GCF Bantamweight Championship. |
| Win | 2–1–1 | Paulina Borkowska | Submission (rear naked choke) | PLMMA 62: AFC 6 | March 25, 2016 | 2 | 2:32 | Wyszków, Poland | |
| Draw | 1–1–1 | Eava Siikonen | Draw (majority) | Carelia Fight 11 | January 9, 2016 | 3 | 5:00 | Imatra, Finland | Bantamweight debut. |
| Loss | 1–1 | Katlyn Chookagian | Submission (armbar) | PMMAL Hungarian FC 9 | May 9, 2015 | 1 | 4:33 | Budapest, Hungary | |
| Win | 1–0 | Barbora Poláková | Submission (armbar) | PMMAL Hungarian FC 9 | May 9, 2015 | 1 | 3:34 | Budapest, Hungary | Flyweight debut. |

| Exhibition record breakdown | | |
| 1 match | 0 wins | 1 loss |
| By submission | 0 | 1 |

| Res. | Record | Opponent | Method | Event | Date | Round | Time | Location | Notes |
|---|---|---|---|---|---|---|---|---|---|
| Loss | 0–1 | Rachael Ostovich | Submission (rear naked choke) | The Ultimate Fighter: A New World Champion | November 15, 2017 (air date) | 1 | 4:22 | Las Vegas, Nevada, United States | TUF 26 preliminary round |

== Karate Combat record ==
Professional record breakdown
| 3 matches | 3 wins | 0 losses |
| By knockout | 1 | 0 |
| By decision | 2 | 0 |

| Res. | Record | Opponent | Method | Event | Date | Round | Time | Location | Notes |
|---|---|---|---|---|---|---|---|---|---|
| Win | 3–0 | Omaira Molina | TKO | Karate Combat 43 | 2023-12-15 | 3 | 3:00 | | Won the Karate Combat Women's Bantamweight Championship. |
| Win | 2–0 | Erica Santos | Decision (unanimous) | Karate Combat 38 | 2023-04-01 | 3 | 3:00 | | |
| Win | 1–0 | Ana Luiza Ferreira Da Silva | Decision (unanimous) | Neo Tokyo - Episode 9 | 2020-11-23 | 3 | 3:00 | | |

== See also ==
- List of female mixed martial artists
