= Nicco Montaño =

American mixed martial artist (born 1988)

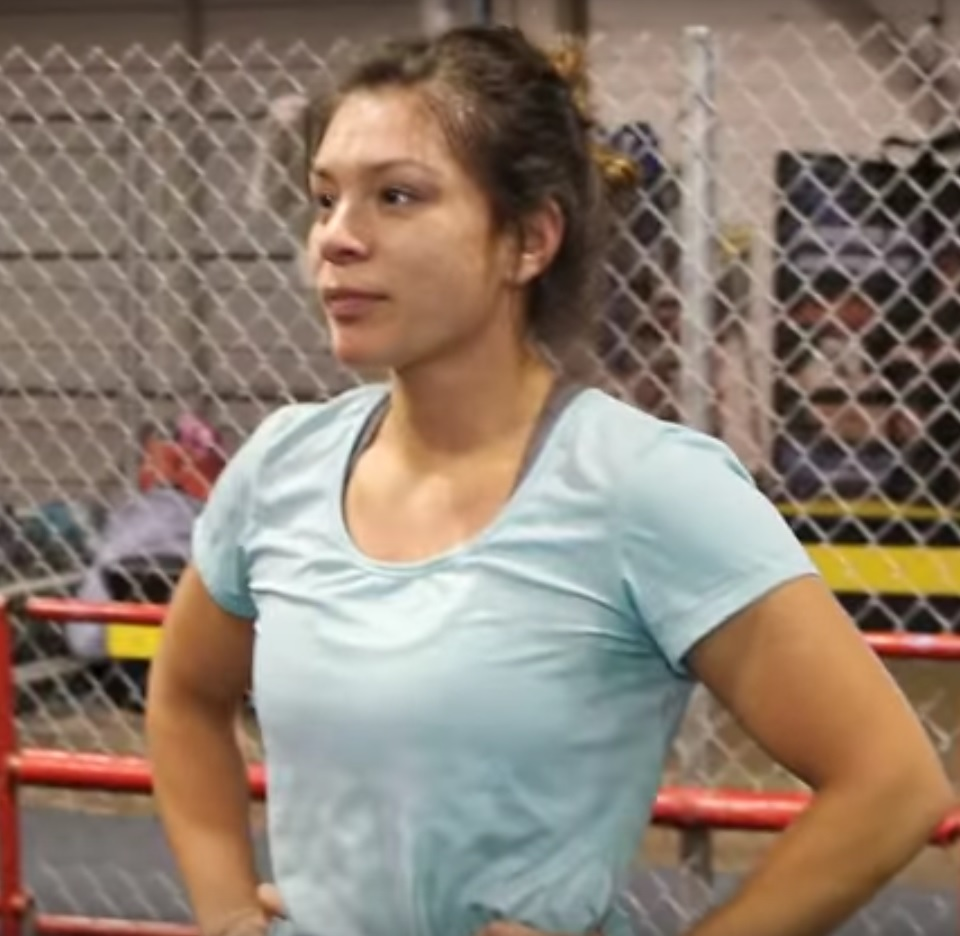
- Montaño in 2016
- Born: Nicco Montaño; December 16, 1988 (age 37); Lukachukai, Arizona, U.S.
- Height: 5 ft 5 in (165 cm)
- Weight: 125 lb (57 kg; 8 st 13 lb)
- Division: Flyweight (2016–2018); Bantamweight (2015–2016, 2019–present)
- Reach: 65 in (165 cm)
- Stance: Southpaw
- Fighting out of: Las Vegas, Nevada, U.S.
- Team: Fit NHB (2015–2019); Jackson Wink MMA Academy (2019); Syndicate MMA (2020–present)
- Rank: Purple belt in Brazilian Jiu-Jitsu under Chris Jones
- Years active: 2013–2019

Mixed martial arts record
- Total: 7
- Wins: 4
- By knockout: 2
- By decision: 2
- Losses: 3
- By decision: 3

Other information
- Mixed martial arts record from Sherdog

Nicco Montaño (born December 16, 1988) is an American mixed martial artist who last competed in the bantamweight division of the Ultimate Fighting Championship (UFC). She was the first UFC Women's Flyweight Champion.

== Background ==
Montaño was born on December 16, 1988 in Lukachukai, Arizona. She is of Navajo, Chickasaw, and Hispanic descent. She graduated from Chinle High School in 2006 then attended Arizona State University in Tempe before transferring to Diné College in Tsaile, Arizona, and finally ending up at Fort Lewis College in Durango, Colorado. There she joined Durango Martial Arts Academy and ignited her passion for martial arts.

Montaño began training in boxing at an early age. She took up Brazilian jiu-jitsu before becoming an MMA fighter in 2013.

== Mixed martial arts career ==
After an amateur career that saw her produce a record of 5–0, Montaño made her professional mixed martial arts debut in November 2015. Competing primarily for King of the Cage, where she won the KOTC Women's Flyweight Championship, Montaño compiled a record of 3–2 before joining the cast of The Ultimate Fighter 26 in mid 2017.

=== The Ultimate Fighter ===
In August 2017, it was announced that Montaño was one of the fighters selected to be on The Ultimate Fighter: A New World Champion.

In her first fight on the show, Montaño faced UFC veteran Lauren Murphy. She won the fight via unanimous decision after two rounds.

In the quarterfinals, Montaño faced off against Montana Stewart. She won the fight via unanimous decision after two rounds.

In the semifinals, Montaño faced former Invicta FC Flyweight Champion Barb Honchak. She won the fight via unanimous decision after three rounds.

=== Ultimate Fighting Championship ===
Montaño was expected to fight Sijara Eubanks for the inaugural UFC Women's Flyweight Championship at The Ultimate Fighter 26 Finale on December 1, 2017. However, Eubanks was pulled from the fight for kidney failure while trying to make weight, and was replaced by Roxanne Modafferi. Montaño won the fight via unanimous decision and claimed the inaugural UFC Women's Flyweight Championship title. This win also earned her the Fight of the Night bonus. At the post fight interview, Montaño revealed her financial struggles prior to her win and her appreciation for the prize money she was about to receive:

“We were dirt poor just before tonight in all reality. I’m going to go move to an apartment with some water pressure, and buy some good food and treats for my cats.”

Montaño was scheduled to face Valentina Shevchenko on September 8, 2018, at UFC 228. However, prior to the weigh-ins for the event, Montaño was transported to a hospital due to the effects of weight cutting and the bout was cancelled. Montaño was subsequently stripped of the UFC Women's Flyweight title.

It was reported that on April 23, 2019, Montaño was suspended by USADA for 6 months for testing positive for ostarine from an out-of-competition test conducted on October 25, 2018. Suspension retroactive from November 15, 2018. She was eligible to fight again on May 15, 2019.

Montaño was expected to face Sara McMann in a bantamweight bout on July 13, 2019, at UFC Fight Night 155. However, McMann pulled out of the bout citing an injury and was replaced by Julianna Peña. She lost the fight via unanimous decision.

Montaño was scheduled to face Macy Chiasson on February 15, 2020, at UFC Fight Night 167. However, Montaño was forced to pull from the event due to injury and she was replaced by Shanna Young.

Montaño was scheduled to face Julia Avila on August 8, 2020, at UFC Fight Night 174. However, due to Montano's coach John Wood testing positive for COVID-19, the bout was rescheduled to UFC Fight Night 176. However, Montaño tested positive for COVID-19 and the bout was moved to UFC Fight Night: Holm vs. Aldana. Subsequently, on September 3, it was announced that Montaño withdrew from the bout due to travel restrictions. In turn Avila was rescheduled to face Sijara Eubanks at UFC Fight Night 177 on September 12.

Montaño was scheduled to face Karol Rosa on February 6, 2021, at UFC Fight Night 184. However, for undisclosed reason, she was pulled from the bout and was replaced by Joselyne Edwards.

Montaño was scheduled to face Wu Yanan on July 31, 2021, at UFC on ESPN 28. However, due to Montaño missing weight by seven pounds at the weigh-ins, her fight against Yanan was canceled.

On August 3, 2021, Montaño was released by the UFC.

== Championships and accomplishments ==
=== Mixed martial arts ===
- Ultimate Fighting Championship
  - UFC Women's Flyweight Champion (One time, inaugural)
  - Fight of the Night (One time) vs. Roxanne Modafferi
  - UFC.com Awards
    - 2017: Ranked #6 Newcomer of the Year

== Mixed martial arts record ==
Professional record breakdown
7 matches	4 wins	3 losses
By knockout	2	0
By decision	2	3

Res.	Record	Opponent	Method	Event	Date	Round	Time	Location	Notes
Loss	4–3	Julianna Peña	Decision (unanimous)	UFC Fight Night: de Randamie vs. Ladd	July 13, 2019	3	5:00	Sacramento, California, United States	Return to Bantamweight.
Win	4–2	Roxanne Modafferi	Decision (unanimous)	The Ultimate Fighter: A New World Champion Finale	December 1, 2017	5	5:00	Las Vegas, Nevada, United States	Won the inaugural UFC Women's Flyweight Championship. Won The Ultimate Fighter 26 Women's Flyweight Tournament. Fight of the Night. Montaño was stripped of the title on September 7, 2018 after being hospitalized due to her weight cut for UFC 228.
Loss	3–2	Julia Avila	Decision (unanimous)	HD MMA 7: Avila vs. Montaño	January 7, 2017	5	5:00	Oklahoma City, Oklahoma, United States	For the HD MMA Women's Bantamweight Championship.
Win	3–1	Jamie Milanowski	TKO (punches)	KOTC: Social Disorder	October 8, 2016	4	4:34	Sloan, Iowa, United States	Won the vacant KOTC Women's Flyweight Championship.
Win	2–1	Shana Dobson	Decision (unanimous)	KOTC: Will Power	August 13, 2016	3	5:00	Albuquerque, New Mexico, United States	Flyweight debut.
Loss	1–1	Pam Sorenson	Decision (split)	KOTC: Frozen War	February 20, 2016	3	5:00	Walker, Minnesota, United States	
Win	1–0	Stacey Sigala	TKO (punches)	KOTC: Evolution	November 20, 2015	1	4:15	Albuquerque, New Mexico, United States	Bantamweight debut.

=== Mixed martial arts exhibition record ===
Exhibition record breakdown		
3 matches	3 wins	0 losses
By decision	3	0

Res.	Record	Opponent	Method	Event	Date	Round	Time	Location	Notes
Win	3–0	Barb Honchak	Decision (unanimous)	The Ultimate Fighter: A New World Champion	November 22, 2017 (air date)	3	5:00	Las Vegas, Nevada, United States	TUF 26 Semi-Finals.
Win	2–0	Montana De La Rosa	Decision (unanimous)	The Ultimate Fighter: A New World Champion	November 15, 2017 (air date)	2	5:00	Las Vegas, Nevada, United States	TUF 26 Quarter-Finals.
Win	1–0	Lauren Murphy	Decision (unanimous)	The Ultimate Fighter: A New World Champion	September 20, 2017 (air date)	2	5:00	Las Vegas, Nevada, United States	TUF 26 preliminary round.

== See also ==
- List of female mixed martial artists

Awards and achievements
Inaugural Champion	1st UFC Women's Flyweight Champion; December 1, 2017 - September 7, 2018; Stripped	Vacant Title next held by Valentina Shevchenko
