= Gina Mazany =

American mixed martial artist

- Born: August 19, 1988 (age 38); Anchorage, Alaska, U.S.
- Other names: Danger
- Height: 5 ft 6 in (168 cm)
- Weight: 61 kg (134 lb; 9 st 8 lb)
- Division: Flyweight; Bantamweight
- Reach: 68 in (173 cm)
- Fighting out of: Las Vegas, Nevada, United States
- Team: Xtreme Couture (2016–2020); Glory MMA and Fitness (2020–present)
- Years active: 2008–present

Mixed martial arts record
- Total: 14
- Wins: 8
- By knockout: 4
- By submission: 1
- By decision: 3
- Losses: 6
- By knockout: 4
- By submission: 1
- By decision: 1

Other information
- University: The Art Institute of Seattle
- Mixed martial arts record from Sherdog

Gina Mazany (born August 19, 1988) is an American mixed martial artist who competed in the Ultimate Fighting Championship (UFC). She formerly competed in King of the Cage in the Bantamweight division.

== Background ==
Mazany was born in Anchorage, Alaska, United States. Mazany was a figure skater when she was young. Mazany graduated from Bartlett High School. She competed her first combat sport in boxing when she was eighteen and transitioned to mixed martial arts (MMA) not long after.

== Mixed martial arts career ==
=== Early career ===
Mazany amassed a record of 4–0 prior joining UFC and She won the women's bantamweight Alaska Fight Championship, beating Katie Halley in 2016.

=== The Ultimate Fighter 18 ===
On September 4, 2013, Mazany competed as a fighter on The Ultimate Fighter: Team Rousey vs. Team Tate. On one of the 16 preliminary fights, Mazany faced Julianna Peña and she lost the fight via unanimous decision after two rounds.

=== Ultimate Fighting Championship ===
Mazany made her promotional debut on February 19, 2017. She faced Sara McMann, replacing Liz Carmouche at UFC Fight Night 105. She lost the fight via submission due to an arm-triangle choke in the first round.

Her second fight in UFC came on November 25, 2017, facing Yanan Wu at UFC Fight Night 122. She won the fight via unanimous decision.

On May 27, 2018, Mazany faced Lina Länsberg at UFC Fight Night 130. She lost the fight via unanimous decision.

Mazany faced Macy Chiasson on March 2, 2019, at UFC 235. She lost the fight via TKO in the first round.

On January 21, 2020, Mazany was released from the UFC.

=== King of the Cage ===
Mazany faced Valerie Barney at King of the Cage: Golden Fights on January 25, 2020. she won the fight in round one.

=== Return to UFC ===
Mazany faced Julia Avila on June 13, 2020, at UFC on ESPN 10. She lost the bout via first-round technical knockout.

Mazany faced Rachael Ostovich on November 28, 2020, at UFC on ESPN 18. She won the fight via third-round TKO from body kicks.

Mazany faced Priscila Cachoeira on May 15, 2021, at UFC 262. She lost the bout via TKO at the end of the second round.

Mazany faced Shanna Young on April 30, 2022, at UFC on ESPN 35. She lost the fight via TKO in the second round.

In May 2022, it was reported that Mazany had once again been released from the UFC.

=== Post UFC ===
In her first bout after her UFC release, Mazany faced Elizabeth Schroder on December 9, 2022 at FAC 17, winning the bout via split decision.

== Personal life ==
Mazany's brother Dave Mazany is also a MMA fighter, who fought under Extreme Fighting Championship (EFC) in South Africa.

After graduating from The Art Institute of Seattle, she worked as a graphic designer.

She was in a relationship with fellow UFC fighter Tim Elliott. On July 28, 2020, Elliott announced on his Instagram that he and Mazany were engaged. Elliott and Mazany have since divorced.

== Championships and accomplishments ==
=== Mixed martial arts ===
- Alaska Fight Championship
  - Alaska Fight Championship Women's Bantamweight Champion

== Mixed martial arts record ==
Professional record breakdown
14 matches	8 wins	6 losses
By knockout	4	4
By submission	1	1
By decision	3	1

Res.	Record	Opponent	Method	Event	Date	Round	Time	Location	Notes
Win	8–6	Elizabeth Schroder	Decision (split)	FAC 17	December 9, 2022	3	5:00	Independence, Missouri, United States	Bantamweight bout.
Loss	7–6	Shanna Young	TKO (punches)	UFC on ESPN: Font vs. Vera	April 30, 2022	2	3:11	Las Vegas, Nevada, United States	
Loss	7–5	Priscila Cachoeira	TKO (punches)	UFC 262	May 15, 2021	2	4:51	Houston, Texas, United States	
Win	7–4	Rachael Ostovich	KO (body kick)	UFC on ESPN: Smith vs. Clark	November 28, 2020	3	4:10	Las Vegas, Nevada, United States	Flyweight debut.
Loss	6–4	Julia Avila	TKO (knee to the body and punches)	UFC on ESPN: Eye vs. Calvillo	June 13, 2020	1	0:22	Las Vegas, Nevada, United States	Bantamweight bout.
Win	6–3	Valerie Barney	TKO (punches)	KOTC: Golden Fights	January 25, 2020	1	3:22	Grand Junction, Colorado, United States	Lightweight debut.
Loss	5–3	Macy Chiasson	TKO (punches)	UFC 235	March 2, 2019	1	1:49	Las Vegas, Nevada, United States	
Loss	5–2	Lina Länsberg	Decision (unanimous)	UFC Fight Night: Thompson vs. Till	May 27, 2018	3	5:00	Liverpool, England	
Win	5–1	Wu Yanan	Decision (unanimous)	UFC Fight Night: Bisping vs. Gastelum	November 25, 2017	3	5:00	Shanghai, China	
Loss	4–1	Sara McMann	Submission (arm-triangle choke)	UFC Fight Night: Lewis vs. Browne	February 19, 2017	1	1:14	Halifax, Nova Scotia, Canada	Catchweight (139.5 lb) bout; Mazany missed weight.
Win	4–0	Katie Halley	TKO (punches)	AFC 124	May 18, 2016	1	2:45	Anchorage, Alaska, United States	
Win	3–0	Priscilla White	Decision (unanimous)	Rumble on the Ridge 27	March 16, 2013	3	5:00	Snoqualmie, Washington, United States	
Win	2–0	Jackie Mikalsky	TKO (punches)	TFC 6	March 20, 2009	1	1:32	Edmonton, Alberta, Canada	
Win	1–0	Violeta Rodriguez	Submission	AFC 50	August 20, 2008	1	1:11	Anchorage, Alaska, United States	

Exhibition record breakdown		
1 match	0 wins	1 loss
By knockout	0	0
By submission	0	0
By decision	0	1

Res.	Record	Opponent	Method	Event	Date	Round	Time	Location	Notes
Loss	0–1	Julianna Peña	Decision (unanimous)	The Ultimate Fighter: Team Rousey vs. Team Tate	September 4, 2013 (air date)	2	5:00	Las Vegas, Nevada, United States	TUF 18 elimination round.

== Professional boxing record ==
1 fight	1 win	0 losses
By decision	1	0

No.	Result	Record	Opponent	Type	Round, time	Date	Location	Notes
1	Win	1–0	Pearl Gonzalez	MD	6	Apr 1, 2023	Fiserv Forum, Milwaukee, Wisconsin, U.S.	

== See also ==
- List of female mixed martial artists
