= Lauren Murphy =

American mixed martial arts (MMA) fighter

- Born: July 27, 1983 (age 43); Anchorage, Alaska, U.S.
- Other names: Lucky
- Height: 5 ft 5 in (1.65 m)
- Weight: 125 lb (57 kg; 8.9 st)
- Division: Featherweight; Bantamweight (2013–2016); Flyweight (2017–present)
- Reach: 67 in (170 cm)
- Fighting out of: Denver, Colorado, U.S.
- Team: The MMA Lab (2014–2019); Main Street Boxing and Muay Thai (2019–present); Grindhouse MMA (2019–present)
- Rank: Black belt in Brazilian Jiu-Jitsu under John Crouch

Mixed martial arts record
- Total: 23
- Wins: 16
- By knockout: 8
- By submission: 1
- By decision: 7
- Losses: 7
- By knockout: 1
- By decision: 6

Other information
- Mixed martial arts record from Sherdog

Lauren Murphy (formerly Taylor, born July 27, 1983) is an American former professional mixed martial artist who competed in the women's Flyweight division of the Ultimate Fighting Championship (UFC). She also fought for Invicta FC where she is a former Invicta FC Bantamweight Champion.

== Background ==
Murphy grew up in a small town in Alaska. Her father was killed in a plane crash when she was 11, causing issues that led to drinking, using drugs and dropping out of high school. Murphy said about starting martial arts: "I took my son to a Jiu Jitsu class in late 2009, and I took the class with him to encourage him. I fell in love with it and started going all the time. I began training MMA about 3 months later, and took my first pro fight 3 months after that. I did not have any amateur fights." She attended nursing school but dropped out to pursue a career in mixed martial arts.

== Mixed martial arts career ==
Murphy began her pro mixed martial arts career in Alaska on June 9, 2010, fighting in the featherweight division (145 lbs). She won four straight fights and captured two featherweight titles; one for Alaska Fighting Championship and one for the now-defunct promotion Alaska Cage Fighting.

After moving to Florida, Murphy stepped in on short notice to face Jennifer Scott in a bantamweight bout at Legacy Fighting Championship 18 on March 1, 2013. She defeated Scott by TKO in the first round.

=== Invicta Fighting Championships ===
Murphy made her Invicta FC debut as a replacement opponent against Kaitlin Young at Invicta FC 5: Penne vs. Waterson on April 5, 2013. She defeated Young by unanimous decision.

On July 13, 2013, Murphy faced Sarah D'Alelio at Invicta FC 6: Coenen vs. Cyborg. She won the fight by unanimous decision.

Murphy faced Miriam Nakamoto for the inaugural Invicta FC Bantamweight Championship at Invicta FC 7: Honchak vs. Smith on December 7, 2013. She won the fight to become the first bantamweight champion when Nakamoto suffered a knee injury in the fourth round.

=== Ultimate Fighting Championship ===
On July 3, 2014, it was announced that Murphy had signed with the UFC. She made her debut against Sara McMann at UFC Fight Night 47 on August 16, 2014. McMann won the fight by split decision.

Murphy faced Liz Carmouche on April 4, 2015, at UFC Fight Night 63. She lost the fight by unanimous decision. However, 10 out of 13 media outlets scored the bout for Murphy, whilst 3 scored it for Carmouche.

Murphy faced Kelly Faszholz on February 21, 2016, at UFC Fight Night 83. She won the fight via TKO due to punches and elbows in the final seconds of the third round. The win also earned Murphy her first Fight of the Night bonus award.

Murphy face Katlyn Chookagian on July 13, 2016, at UFC Fight Night: McDonald vs. Lineker. She lost the fight via unanimous decision.

==== The Ultimate Fighter ====
In August 2017, it was announced that Murphy would be one of the fighters featured on The Ultimate Fighter 26, where the process to crown the UFC's inaugural 125-pound women's champion will take place.

Murphy, representing team Alvarez, was seeded third and therefore was automatically set to fight fourteenth seed Nicco Montaño. She lost the fight via Unanimous Decision in two rounds, eliminating her from the competition. Later, feeling discontent with her training on Team Alvarez (especially with Alvarez), she switched teams to Gaethje.

=== UFC return ===
Murphy was scheduled to face Priscila Cachoeira on December 1, 2017, at The Ultimate Fighter 26 Finale. However, due to a visa issue, the fight was cancelled and Murphy was asked to be ready to fight as an alternate. With Roxanne Modafferi elevated to the main event to fight Nicco Montaño after Sijara Eubanks was medically disqualified from the title fight, Murphy stepped in to face Barb Honchak. Murphy won the back-and-forth fight by split decision.

Murphy faced Sijara Eubanks at UFC Fight Night: Rivera vs. Moraes on June 1, 2018. She lost the fight via unanimous decision.

Murphy was scheduled to face Ashlee Evans-Smith on February 17, 2019, at UFC on ESPN 1. However, on December 19, 2018, Murphy announced and withdraw from the event as she would need more time off to recover from foot surgery.

Murphy faced Mara Romero Borella on August 3, 2019, at UFC on ESPN 5. She won the fight via TKO in the third round.

Murphy faced Andrea Lee on February 8, 2020, at UFC 247. She won the fight via controversial split decision. 12 out of 12 MMA media outlets scored the contest for Lee with none scoring it for Murphy, despite Murphy achieving a higher degree of accuracy and securing the only two takedowns in the fight.

Murphy faced Roxanne Modafferi on June 20, 2020, at UFC Fight Night: Blaydes vs. Volkov. She won the fight by unanimous decision.

Murphy was expected to face Cynthia Calvillo on October 24, 2020 at UFC 254. However, Calvillo was forced to withdraw the bout due to positive COVID-19 test and was replaced by an undisclosed fighter. In turn, the substitute also tested positive for COVID-19 and was replaced by promotional newcomer Liliya Shakirova. Murphy won the fight via a submission in round two.

As the first bout of her new contract, Murphy faced Joanne Calderwood on June 12, 2021, at UFC 263. She won the fight via split decision.

Murphy faced Valentina Shevchenko for the UFC Women's Flyweight Championship on September 25, 2021, at UFC 266. She lost the fight via technical knockout in round four.

Murphy was scheduled to face former UFC Women's Bantamweight Champion Miesha Tate May 14, 2022, at UFC on ESPN 36. However, the bout was moved to UFC 276 for unknown reasons. In turn, a week before that event, Murphy pulled out after she tested positive for COVID-19. The bout was then rescheduled and eventually took place on July 16, 2022, at UFC on ABC 3. Murphy won the fight via unanimous decision.

Murphy faced former UFC Women's Strawweight Champion Jéssica Andrade on January 21, 2023, at UFC 283. She lost the fight via unanimous decision.

In a July 2024 interview, Murphy stated her intentions on retiring after her final bout in her contract which she hoped to take place by the end of the year.

After a two-year absence, for her retirement fight, Murphy faced Eduarda Moura on July 12, 2025, at UFC on ESPN 70. She lost the fight by unanimous decision and retired from mixed martial arts competition after the fight.

== Professional grappling career ==
Murphy defended her 135lbs no gi title at Submission Hunter Pro 84 on July 22, 2023, winning the match by submission with an arm-triangle choke.

== Personal life ==
Murphy has a son from a previous relationship.

== Championships and accomplishments ==
=== Mixed martial arts ===
- Alaska Cage Fighting
  - Alaska Cage Fighting women's featherweight champion (one time)
- Alaska Fighting Championship
  - Alaska Fighting Championship women's featherweight champion (one time)
- Invicta Fighting Championships
  - Invicta FC Bantamweight Championship (one time; former)
- Ultimate Fighting Championship
  - Fight of the Night (One time) vs. Kelly Faszholz

=== Brazilian jiu-jitsu ===
- 2014 IBJJF Blue Belt Middle Weight No Gi World Championship Gold Medalist

== Mixed martial arts record ==
Professional record breakdown
23 matches	16 wins	7 losses
By knockout	8	1
By submission	1	0
By decision	7	6

Res.	Record	Opponent	Method	Event	Date	Round	Time	Location	Notes
Loss	16–7	Eduarda Moura	Decision (unanimous)	UFC on ESPN: Lewis vs. Teixeira	July 12, 2025	3	5:00	Nashville, Tennessee, United States	
Loss	16–6	Jéssica Andrade	Decision (unanimous)	UFC 283	January 21, 2023	3	5:00	Rio de Janeiro, Brazil	
Win	16–5	Miesha Tate	Decision (unanimous)	UFC on ABC: Ortega vs. Rodríguez	July 16, 2022	3	5:00	Elmont, New York, United States	
Loss	15–5	Valentina Shevchenko	TKO (elbows and punches)	UFC 266	September 25, 2021	4	4:00	Las Vegas, Nevada, United States	For the UFC Women's Flyweight Championship.
Win	15–4	Joanne Calderwood	Decision (split)	UFC 263	June 12, 2021	3	5:00	Glendale, Arizona, United States	
Win	14–4	Liliya Shakirova	Submission (rear-naked choke)	UFC 254	October 24, 2020	2	3:31	Abu Dhabi, United Arab Emirates	
Win	13–4	Roxanne Modafferi	Decision (unanimous)	UFC on ESPN: Blaydes vs. Volkov	June 20, 2020	3	5:00	Las Vegas, Nevada, United States	
Win	12–4	Andrea Lee	Decision (split)	UFC 247	February 8, 2020	3	5:00	Houston, Texas, United States	
Win	11–4	Mara Romero Borella	TKO (knee and elbows)	UFC on ESPN: Covington vs. Lawler	August 3, 2019	3	1:46	Newark, New Jersey, United States	
Loss	10–4	Sijara Eubanks	Decision (unanimous)	UFC Fight Night: Rivera vs. Moraes	June 1, 2018	3	5:00	Utica, New York, United States	
Win	10–3	Barb Honchak	Decision (split)	The Ultimate Fighter: A New World Champion Finale	December 1, 2017	3	5:00	Las Vegas, Nevada, United States	Flyweight debut.
Loss	9–3	Katlyn Chookagian	Decision (unanimous)	UFC Fight Night: McDonald vs. Lineker	July 13, 2016	3	5:00	Sioux Falls, South Dakota, United States	
Win	9–2	Kelly Faszholz	TKO (elbows and punches)	UFC Fight Night: Cowboy vs. Cowboy	February 21, 2016	3	4:55	Pittsburgh, Pennsylvania, United States	Fight of the Night.
Loss	8–2	Liz Carmouche	Decision (unanimous)	UFC Fight Night: Mendes vs. Lamas	April 4, 2015	3	5:00	Fairfax, Virginia, United States	
Loss	8–1	Sara McMann	Decision (split)	UFC Fight Night: Bader vs. Saint Preux	August 16, 2014	3	5:00	Bangor, Maine, United States	
Win	8–0	Miriam Nakamoto	TKO (knee injury)	Invicta FC 7	December 7, 2013	4	0:23	Kansas City, Missouri, United States	Won the inaugural Invicta FC Bantamweight Championship.
Win	7–0	Sarah D'Alelio	Decision (unanimous)	Invicta FC 6	July 13, 2013	3	5:00	Kansas City, Missouri, United States	
Win	6–0	Kaitlin Young	Decision (unanimous)	Invicta FC 5	April 5, 2013	3	5:00	Kansas City, Missouri, United States	
Win	5–0	Jennifer Scott	TKO (elbows)	Legacy FC 18	March 1, 2013	1	4:10	Houston, Texas, United States	Bantamweight debut.
Win	4–0	Julia Griffin	TKO (punches)	Alaska Cage Fighting: Tribute to Veterans	October 28, 2011	2	4:26	Fairbanks, Alaska, United States	Won the ACF Women's Featherweight Championship.
Win	3–0	Willow Bailey	TKO (retirement)	Alaska FC 79	January 12, 2011	2	3:00	Anchorage, Alaska, United States	Won the Alaska FC Women's Featherweight Championship.
Win	2–0	Leslie Wright	TKO (punches)	Alaska FC 76	October 13, 2010	2	2:25	Anchorage, Alaska, United States	
Win	1–0	Kloiah Wayland	TKO (punches)	Alaska FC: Mat Su Showdown 2	June 9, 2010	1	0:17	Wasilla, Alaska, United States	Featherweight debut.

=== Mixed martial arts exhibition record ===
Exhibition record breakdown		
1 match	0 wins	1 loss
By decision	0	1

Res.	Record	Opponent	Method	Event	Date	Round	Time	Location	Notes
Loss	0–1	Nicco Montaño	Decision (unanimous)	The Ultimate Fighter: A New World Champion	September 20, 2017 (airdate)	2	5:00	Las Vegas, Nevada, United States	TUF 26 Elimination round.

== See also ==
- List of female mixed martial artists

Awards and achievements
Preceded by New championship	1st Invicta FC Bantamweight Champion; December 7, 2013 – July 3, 2014	Succeeded by Tonya Evinger
