= Julia Avila =

American mixed martial arts fighter

- Born: May 11, 1988 (age 38); Los Angeles, California, U.S.
- Other names: Raging Panda, Julia Shumate
- Height: 5 ft 7 in (1.70 m)
- Weight: 135 lb (61 kg; 9.6 st)
- Reach: 69 in (175 cm)
- Fighting out of: Oklahoma City, Oklahoma
- Team: Bakersfield MMA (2011–2014); All Powers Fitness and Fighting; Junkyard Dogs Fight Team; Oklahoma Martial Arts Academy (2014–2021); Outsiders Combat Club (2021–present)
- Rank: Brown belt in Brazilian Jiu-Jitsu under Seth Norman
- Years active: 2012–2025

Mixed martial arts record
- Total: 13
- Wins: 9
- By knockout: 4
- By submission: 2
- By decision: 3
- Losses: 4
- By knockout: 1
- By submission: 1
- By decision: 2

Other information
- Spouse: R. Cody Shumate
- Mixed martial arts record from Sherdog

Julia Avila (born May 11, 1988) is a former American mixed martial artist who competed in the Ultimate Fighting Championship (UFC). Previously she has competed in Invicta FC, HD MMA, XKO MMA, Total Warrior Combat and King of the Cage (KOTC).

== Background ==
Of Mexican descent, Avila was born May 11, 1988 in Los Angeles, California. Julia graduated from South High School, where she was a sports standout and a member of varsity team in volleyball, soccer and track and field. She attended The University of Notre Dame, graduated 2010 from University of California, Santa Cruz, and is currently a geologist in Oklahoma City. She began training martial arts in 2011 after graduating from college.

== Mixed martial arts career ==
Avila has notable wins over former UFC flyweight champion Nicco Montaño and Marion Reneau.

=== Ultimate Fighting Championship ===
On March 22, 2019, Avila was signed to the UFC's women's bantamweight division. Avila was originally scheduled to face Melissa Gatto on July 6, 2019, at UFC 239. Gatto was dropped from the card due to undisclosed reasons and was replaced by Pannie Kianzad. Avila won the fight via unanimous decision.

Avila was expected to face Karol Rosa on October 26, 2019, at UFC Fight Night: Maia vs. Askren. The fight was later cancelled due to a knee injury from Rosa. The match was rescheduled to April 11, 2020, at UFC Fight Night: Overeem vs. Harris. Due to the COVID-19 pandemic, the event was eventually postponed. The pair was rescheduled to meet on May 2, 2020, at UFC Fight Night 174. However, on April 9, Dana White, the president of UFC announced that the event was postponed to June 13, 2020. Instead, Avila faced Gina Mazany, replacing Rosa, on June 13, 2020, at UFC on ESPN: Eye vs. Calvillo. She won the bout via first-round technical knockout just 22 seconds into the fight.

Avila was scheduled to face Nicco Montaño on August 8, 2020, at UFC Fight Night 176. However, due to Montano's coach John Wood testing positive for COVID-19, the bout was rescheduled to UFC Fight Night 177. However, Montaño tested positive for COVID-19 and the bout was moved to UFC Fight Night: Holm vs. Aldana. Subsequently, on September 3, it was announced that Montaño withdrew from the bout due to travel restrictions. After negotiating a new contract with the UFC, Avila faced Sijara Eubanks on September 12, 2020, at UFC Fight Night 177. She lost the fight via unanimous decision.

Avila was expected to face Julija Stoliarenko at UFC on ESPN 21 on March 20, 2021. However at the weigh ins, Stoliarenko suffered a syncopal episode on the scale and the fight was scrapped. The pair was rescheduled and took place at UFC Fight Night 190. Avila won the fight via rear naked choke submission in round three.

Avila was scheduled to face Raquel Pennington on December 18, 2021, at UFC Fight Night 199. However, Avila was forced to pull from the event due to injury. She was replaced by Macy Chiasson.

After a two-years hiatus, Avila returned against former UFC Women's Bantamweight Champion Miesha Tate on December 2, 2023, at UFC on ESPN 52. She lost the fight via a rear-naked choke submission in round three.

Avila faced former LFA Women's Bantamweight Champion Jacqueline Cavalcanti on February 15, 2025 at UFC Fight Night 251. She lost the fight by unanimous decision. She retired from MMA competition after the bout.

== Personal life ==
Avila is married. Avila and her husband had their first child, a daughter, on October 20, 2022.

== Championships and accomplishments ==
- Invicta FC
  - Performance of the Night (one time) vs. Alexa Conners
- HD MMA
  - HD MMA Bantamweight Championship (one time; former)

== Mixed martial arts record ==
Professional record breakdown
13 matches	9 wins	4 losses
By knockout	4	1
By submission	2	1
By decision	3	2

Res.	Record	Opponent	Method	Event	Date	Round	Time	Location	Notes
Loss	9–4	Jacqueline Cavalcanti	Decision (unanimous)	UFC Fight Night: Cannonier vs. Rodrigues	February 15, 2025	3	5:00	Las Vegas, Nevada, United States	
Loss	9–3	Miesha Tate	Submission (face crank)	UFC on ESPN: Dariush vs. Tsarukyan	December 2, 2023	3	1:15	Austin, Texas, United States	
Win	9–2	Julija Stoliarenko	Submission (rear-naked choke)	UFC Fight Night: Gane vs. Volkov	June 26, 2021	3	4:19	Las Vegas, Nevada, United States	
Loss	8–2	Sijara Eubanks	Decision (unanimous)	UFC Fight Night: Waterson vs. Hill	September 12, 2020	3	5:00	Las Vegas, Nevada, United States	
Win	8–1	Gina Mazany	TKO (punches)	UFC on ESPN: Eye vs. Calvillo	June 13, 2020	1	0:22	Las Vegas, Nevada, United States	
Win	7–1	Pannie Kianzad	Decision (unanimous)	UFC 239	July 6, 2019	3	5:00	Las Vegas, Nevada, United States	
Win	6–1	Alexa Conners	TKO (front kick and punches)	Invicta FC 32	November 16, 2018	2	4:43	Shawnee, Oklahoma, United States	Performance of the Night.
Win	5–1	Ashley Deen	KO (punches)	HD MMA 13	August 25, 2018	1	2:08	Shawnee, Oklahoma, United States	
Loss	4–1	Marciea Allen	TKO (hand injury)	Invicta FC 29	May 4, 2018	1	0:49	Kansas City, Missouri, United States	
Win	4–0	Candace Maricle	Submission (armbar)	HD MMA 9	July 22, 2017	1	1:18	Oklahoma City, Oklahoma, United States	
Win	3–0	Nicco Montaño	Decision (unanimous)	HD MMA 7	January 7, 2017	5	5:00	Oklahoma City, Oklahoma, United States	Won the HD MMA Women's Bantamweight Championship.
Win	2–0	Carolyn Biskup-Roe	TKO (punches)	Xtreme Knockout 32	August 27, 2016	1	1:28	Dallas, Texas, United States	
Win	1–0	Marion Reneau	Decision (unanimous)	The Warriors Cage 13	January 27, 2012	3	5:00	Porterville, California, United States	Bantamweight debut.

== Beast Games ==
Shumate competed on Team Strong in Beast Games season 2 but was eliminated in the opening challenge of Episode 1.

== See also ==
- List of female mixed martial artists
