= Katlyn Cerminara =

American mixed martial artist

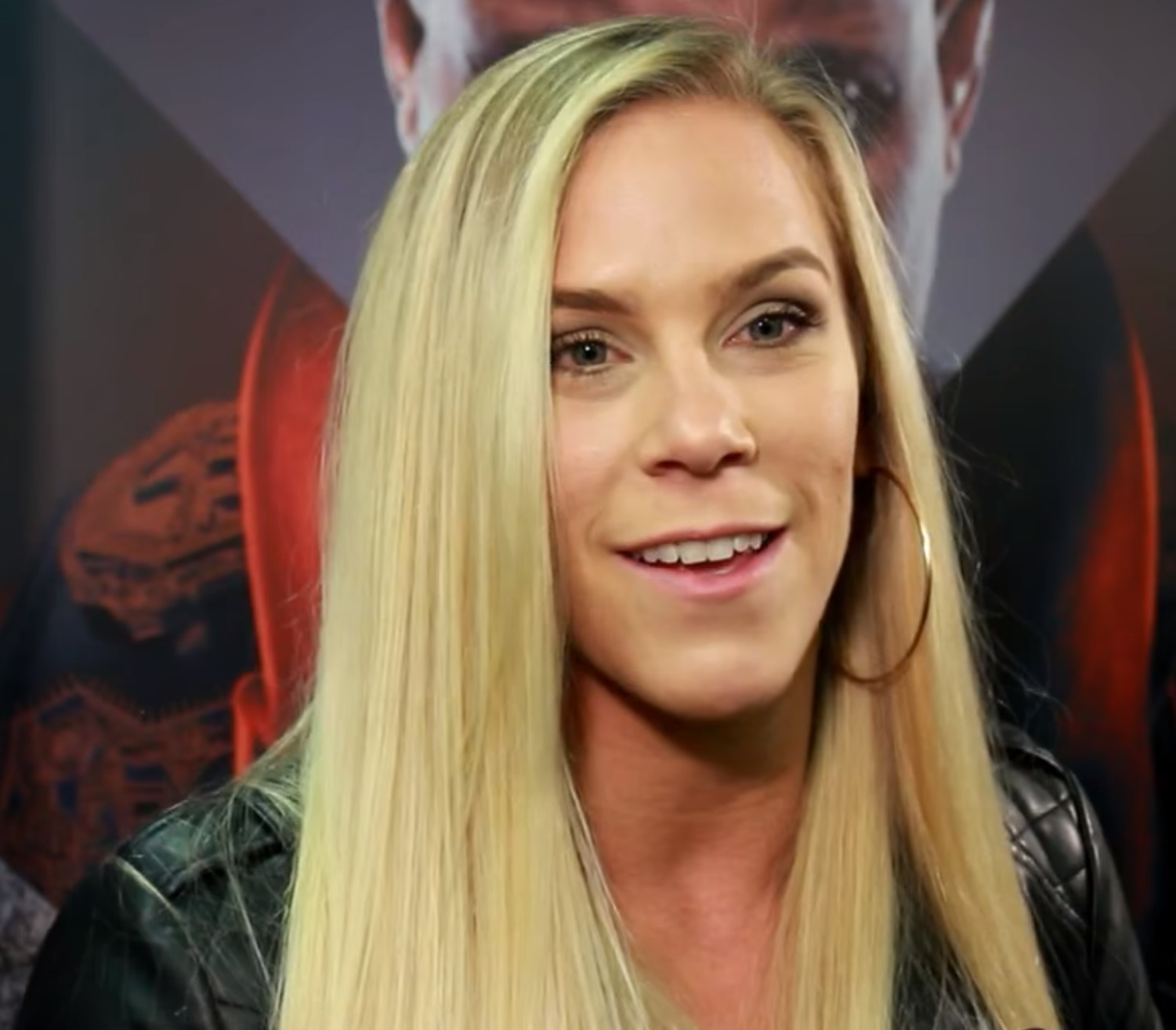
- Katlyn Cerminara speaks at UFC 230 in 2018
- Born: Katlyn Chookagian; December 28, 1988 (age 37); Quakertown, Pennsylvania, U.S.
- Other names: Blonde Fighter
- Height: 5 ft 9 in (1.75 m)
- Weight: 128 lb (58 kg; 9.1 st)
- Division: Bantamweight; Flyweight
- Reach: 68 in (173 cm)
- Fighting out of: Amity Harbor, New York, U.S.
- Team: Renzo Gracie Combat Team
- Rank: Black belt in Brazilian jiu-jitsu under Jason Rau
- Years active: 2012–present

Mixed martial arts record
- Total: 25
- Wins: 19
- By knockout: 3
- By submission: 1
- By decision: 15
- Losses: 6
- By knockout: 2
- By decision: 4

Other information
- University: Fairleigh Dickinson University
- Mixed martial arts record from Sherdog

Katlyn Cerminara (née Chookagian; born December 28, 1988) is an American professional mixed martial artist. She formerly competed in the Bantamweight division and currently competes in the women's Flyweight division of the Ultimate Fighting Championship (UFC).

== Early life and education ==
Cerminara was born in Quakertown, Pennsylvania, where she graduated from Quakertown Senior High School. She is of Armenian descent.

Her first job was serving pizza at Q-Mart, and she also worked as a bartender in Hoboken, New Jersey.

Cerminara started training karate when she was four years old, started fighting as an amateur in mixed martial arts (MMA) in 2012, and became a professional in 2014. Her teammates and training partners have included Gordon Ryan, Claudia Gadelha, Sijara Eubanks, and the team captain Frankie Edgar. Cerminara holds a bachelor's degree in business management and marketing from Fairleigh Dickinson University.

== Career ==
=== Mixed martial arts career ===
After going 7–0 as an amateur, Cerminara made her professional mixed martial arts debut against Rebecca Heintzman on June 28, 2014, at CFFC 37. She won the fight via unanimous decision.

Cerminara made her second professional fight at World Series of Fighting 13: Moraes vs. Bollinger on September 13, 2014. Katlyn Cerminara secured a knockout triumph against 44-year-old Brigitte Narcise at 38 seconds of the final round in the flyweight category.

Cerminara had her two subsequent bouts canceled. Against Allanna Jones in the Ring of Combat 49, and against Nohime Dennison at CFFC 45. Finally, on May 9, 2015, she fought twice in the same day, beating Linn Wennergren by unanimous decision, and Melinda Fábián by submission in the first round.

She returned to the event where she made her debut, the CFFC, and held three more fights there. The results continued great: two belts, two victories by unanimous decision and one by knockout, due to a knee.

Cerminara debuted in the UFC on July 13, 2016, at UFC Fight Night 91 against Lauren Murphy. She won the fight via unanimous decision.

Cerminara next fought Liz Carmouche at UFC 205. She lost the bout via split decision.

Cerminara faced Irene Aldana at UFC 210 on April 8, 2017. She won the fight by decision.

Cerminara faced Mara Romero Borella on January 27, 2018, at UFC on Fox 27. She won the fight via unanimous decision.

Cerminara faced Alexis Davis on July 28, 2018, at UFC on Fox 30. She won the fight by unanimous decision.

Cerminara faced Jessica Eye on December 8, 2018, at UFC 231. She lost the fight by split decision.

Cerminara faced Joanne Calderwood on June 8, 2019, at UFC 238. She won the fight by unanimous decision.

Cerminara faced Jennifer Maia on November 2, 2019, at UFC 244. At the weigh-ins, Maia weighted at 127.2 pounds, 1.2 pounds over the flyweight non-title fight limit of 126. The bout proceed at catchweight and Maia was fined 25% of her purse and went to Chookagian. She won the fight via unanimous decision.

Cerminara faced Valentina Shevchenko for the UFC Flyweight Champion on February 8, 2020, at UFC 247. She lost the bout via technical knockout in round three.

Cerminara faced Antonina Shevchenko May 30, 2020 at UFC on ESPN 9. After dominating Shevchenko on the ground throughout the bout, Chookagian won the fight via unanimous decision.

Cerminara faced Jéssica Andrade on October 18, 2020 at UFC Fight Night 180. She lost the fight via technical knockout in round one.

Cerminara faced Cynthia Calvillo on November 21, 2020, at UFC 255. She won the fight via unanimous decision.

Cerminara faced Viviane Araújo on May 15, 2021, at UFC 262. She won the bout via unanimous decision.

Cerminara faced Jennifer Maia on January 15, 2022, at UFC on ESPN 32. She won the fight via unanimous decision. Despite winning three fights in a row, it was reported on January 16 that the bout with Jennifer Maia was the last fight on her contract. In a post-fight interview, Cerminara claimed that the UFC declined to negotiate a new contract with her prior to the Jennifer Maia bout, making her a free agent.

As the first bout of her new contract, Cerminara faced Amanda Ribas on May 14, 2022 at UFC on ESPN 36. She won the back-and-forth fight by split decision. The win also earned Chookagian her first Fight of the Night bonus award.

Cerminara was scheduled to face Manon Fiorot on September 3, 2022, at UFC Fight Night 209. However, Cerminara withdrew for unknown reasons in mid June and was replaced by former UFC Women's Strawweight Champion Jéssica Andrade. In turn, Andrade withdrew in mid-July due to undisclosed reasons and was replaced by Fiorot's original opponent: Cerminara. After Fiorot injured her knee, the bout was eventually shifted to take place at UFC 280 on October 22, 2022. At the weigh-ins, Cerminara weighed in at 127.5 pounds, 1.5 pounds over the flyweight non-title fight limit. Cerminara was fined 20% of her purse, which went to her opponent Fiorot. She lost the fight by unanimous decision.

Cerminara faced Maycee Barber on March 9, 2024, at UFC 299. She lost the bout by unanimous decision.

After a two-year hiatus, Cerminara was scheduled to face Jamey-Lyn Horth on October 17, 2026, at UFC Fight Night 291. However, Horth had to withdraw due to an injury and was replaced by promotional newcomer Mackenzie Stiller. Cerminara won the fight by technical knockout via head kick and punches in the first round, marking the first finish of her UFC career.

== Personal life ==
Cerminara took a break from fighting after her final 2022 fight and suffered two miscarriages.

== Championships and accomplishments ==
- Ultimate Fighting Championship
  - Fight of the Night (One time) vs. Amanda Ribas
  - Most decision wins in UFC Women's history (11)
    - Most unanimous decision wins in UFC Women's Flyweight division history (8)
    - Second highest decision wins per win percentage in UFC history (11 decision wins / 12 wins: 91.67%)
    - Tied (Natália Silva, Valentina Shevchenko & JJ Aldrich) for most decision wins in UFC Women's Flyweight division history (9)
    - Second most decision bouts in UFC Women's Flyweight division history (11) (behind Andrea Lee)
  - Second most wins in UFC Women's Flyweight division history (10) (behind Valentina Shevchenko)
  - Most bouts in UFC Women's Flyweight division history (15)
  - Second most significant strikes landed in UFC Women's Flyweight division history (964) (behind Joanne Wood)
    - Third most total strikes landed in UFC Women's Flyweight division history (1240)
  - Second most total fight time in UFC Women's Flyweight division history (3:20:44) (behind Valentina Shevchenko)
- Cage Fury Fighting Championships
  - CFFC Woman's Flyweight Champion (One time)
  - CFFC Woman's Bantamweight Champion (One time)

== Mixed martial arts record ==
Professional record breakdown
25 matches	19 wins	6 losses
By knockout	3	2
By submission	1	0
By decision	15	4

Res.	Record	Opponent	Method	Event	Date	Round	Time	Location	Notes
Win	19–6	Mackenzie Stiller	TKO (head kick and punches)	UFC Fight Night: Buckley vs. Malott	October 17, 2026	1	4:46	Edmonton, Alberta, Canada	
Loss	18–6	Maycee Barber	Decision (unanimous)	UFC 299	March 9, 2024	3	5:00	Miami, Florida, United States	
Loss	18–5	Manon Fiorot	Decision (unanimous)	UFC 280	October 22, 2022	3	5:00	Abu Dhabi, United Arab Emirates	Catchweight (127.5 lb) bout; Cerminara missed weight.
Win	18–4	Amanda Ribas	Decision (split)	UFC on ESPN: Błachowicz vs. Rakić	May 14, 2022	3	5:00	Las Vegas, Nevada, United States	Fight of the Night.
Win	17–4	Jennifer Maia	Decision (unanimous)	UFC on ESPN: Kattar vs. Chikadze	January 15, 2022	3	5:00	Las Vegas, Nevada, United States	
Win	16–4	Viviane Araújo	Decision (unanimous)	UFC 262	May 15, 2021	3	5:00	Houston, Texas, United States	
Win	15–4	Cynthia Calvillo	Decision (unanimous)	UFC 255	November 21, 2020	3	5:00	Las Vegas, Nevada, United States	
Loss	14–4	Jéssica Andrade	KO (punches to the body)	UFC Fight Night: Ortega vs. The Korean Zombie	October 18, 2020	1	4:55	Abu Dhabi, United Arab Emirates	
Win	14–3	Antonina Shevchenko	Decision (unanimous)	UFC on ESPN: Woodley vs. Burns	May 30, 2020	3	5:00	Las Vegas, Nevada, United States	
Loss	13–3	Valentina Shevchenko	TKO (elbows and punches)	UFC 247	February 8, 2020	3	1:03	Houston, Texas, United States	For the UFC Women's Flyweight Championship.
Win	13–2	Jennifer Maia	Decision (unanimous)	UFC 244	November 2, 2019	3	5:00	New York City, New York, United States	Catchweight (127.2 lb) bout; Maia missed weight.
Win	12–2	Joanne Calderwood	Decision (unanimous)	UFC 238	June 8, 2019	3	5:00	Chicago, Illinois, United States	
Loss	11–2	Jessica Eye	Decision (split)	UFC 231	December 8, 2018	3	5:00	Toronto, Ontario, Canada	
Win	11–1	Alexis Davis	Decision (unanimous)	UFC on Fox: Alvarez vs. Poirier 2	July 28, 2018	3	5:00	Calgary, Alberta, Canada	
Win	10–1	Mara Romero Borella	Decision (unanimous)	UFC on Fox: Jacaré vs. Brunson 2	January 27, 2018	3	5:00	Charlotte, North Carolina, United States	Return to Flyweight.
Win	9–1	Irene Aldana	Decision (split)	UFC 210	April 8, 2017	3	5:00	Buffalo, New York, United States	
Loss	8–1	Liz Carmouche	Decision (split)	UFC 205	November 12, 2016	3	5:00	New York City, New York, United States	
Win	8–0	Lauren Murphy	Decision (unanimous)	UFC Fight Night: McDonald vs. Lineker	July 13, 2016	3	5:00	Sioux Falls, South Dakota, United States	
Win	7–0	Stephanie Bragayrac	KO (knee)	CFFC 57	March 19, 2016	1	0:45	Philadelphia, Pennsylvania, United States	Bantamweight debut. Won the CFFC Women's Bantamweight Championship.
Win	6–0	Isabelly Varela	Decision (unanimous)	CFFC 55	January 9, 2016	5	5:00	Atlantic City, New Jersey, United States	Won the vacant CFFC Women's Flyweight Championship.
Win	5–0	Sijara Eubanks	Decision (unanimous)	CFFC 52	October 31, 2015	3	5:00	Atlantic City, New Jersey, United States	
Win	4–0	Melinda Fábián	Submission (armbar)	PMMAL Hungarian Fight Championship 9	May 9, 2015	1	4:33	Budapest, Hungary	
Win	3–0	Linn Wennergren	Decision (unanimous)	PMMAL Hungarian Fight Championship 9	May 9, 2015	3	5:00	Budapest, Hungary	
Win	2–0	Brigitte Narcisse	KO (knees)	WSOF 13	September 13, 2014	3	0:38	Bethlehem, Pennsylvania, United States	Flyweight debut.
Win	1–0	Rebecca Heintzman	Decision (unanimous)	CFFC 37	June 28, 2014	3	5:00	Philadelphia, Pennsylvania, United States	Strawweight debut.
