= Sijara Eubanks =

American mixed martial artist

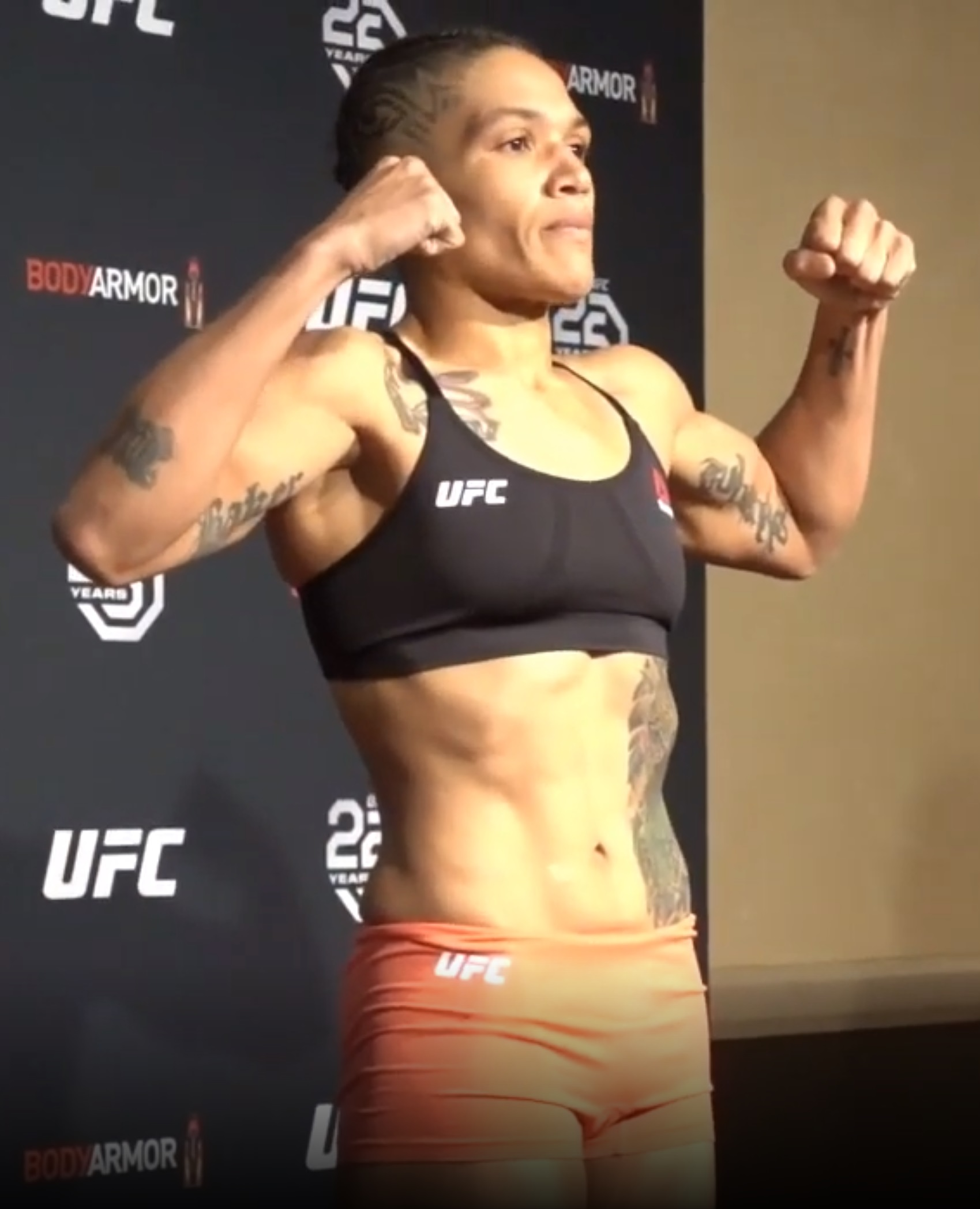
- Eubanks at the UFC 230 weigh-in, 2018
- Born: Sijara Jihan Eubanks; April 27, 1985 (age 41); Springfield, Massachusetts, U.S.
- Other names: SarJ
- Nationality: American
- Height: 5 ft 4 in (1.63 m)
- Weight: 135 lb (61 kg; 9.6 st)
- Division: Bantamweight
- Style: Brazilian Jiu-Jitsu
- Fighting out of: Bricktown, New Jersey, U.S.
- Team: Team Lloyd Irvin (2008–2016); Nick Catone MMA (2016–present)
- Trainer: Nick Catone; Mark Henry
- Rank: Black belt in Brazilian Jiu-Jitsu under Lloyd Irvin
- Years active: 2015–present

Mixed martial arts record
- Total: 14
- Wins: 7
- By knockout: 3
- By decision: 4
- Losses: 7
- By knockout: 1
- By decision: 6

Other information
- Mixed martial arts record from Sherdog

Sijara Jihan Eubanks (/sɪˈdʒɑːrə/ si-JAH-rə; born April 27, 1985) is an American professional mixed martial artist who competed in the women's bantamweight division of the Ultimate Fighting Championship.

== Background ==
Eubanks was born and raised in Springfield, Massachusetts, and graduated from the High School of Commerce. She then went to Morgan State University. She started training Brazilian jiu-jitsu under Lloyd Irvin in 2008 and to extend her repertoire for mixed martial arts, she later started boxing and other disciplines. She competed in jiu-jitsu, winning the Women's No-Gi Advanced Absolute division in the 2011 Grapplers Quest World Championship Finals and IBJJF World Championship as a brown belt in 2014.

== Mixed martial arts career ==
=== Early career ===
After an undefeated MMA record as an amateur, she turned professional in April 2015.

=== Invicta FC ===
Eubanks made her professional debut on April 24, 2015, against Gina Begley at Invicta FC 12. She won the fight via TKO in the first round.

In her second pro bout, Eubanks faced Katlyn Chookagian at Cage Fury FC 52 on October 31, 2015. She lost the fight via unanimous decision.

In her second fight for Invicta FC, Eubanks faced AmberLynn Orr on July 29, 2016, at Invicta FC 18. She won the fight via TKO in the first round.

In her third fight for the promotion, Eubanks faced Aspen Ladd on January 14, 2017, at Invicta FC 21. She lost the fight by unanimous decision, bringing her record to 2-2 before joining The Ultimate Fighter.

=== The Ultimate Fighter ===
In August 2017, Eubanks was announced to be one of the fighters featured on The Ultimate Fighter 26, where the process to crown the UFC's inaugural 125-pound women's champion was to take place.

In the first round, Eubanks defeated Maia Stevenson via submission in the second round, allowing her to move on to the next stage of the competition. In the quarterfinals, Eubanks faced DeAnna Bennett and won the fight by a knockout in round one. In the semifinals, Eubanks faced Roxanne Modafferi. She won the fight via unanimous decision after three rounds.

=== Ultimate Fighting Championship ===
Eubanks was scheduled to face Nicco Montaño on December 1, 2017, at The Ultimate Fighter 26 Finale for the inaugural UFC Women's Flyweight Championship. She was pulled from the fight for kidney failure while trying to make weight, and was replaced by Roxanne Modafferi.

Eubanks made her UFC debut against Lauren Murphy at UFC Fight Night: Rivera vs. Moraes on June 1, 2018. She won the bout by unanimous decision.

Eubanks was scheduled to face Valentina Shevchenko for the vacant UFC Women's Flyweight Championship at UFC 230 on November 3, 2018. However, the fight was canceled on October 9, 2018, after the UFC announced that a fight between Daniel Cormier and Derrick Lewis would instead main event UFC 230 and that Shevchenko would also return to her original bout for the vacant title, against Joanna Jędrzejczyk at UFC 231. Eubanks remained on the card and faced Roxanne Modafferi. At the weigh-ins, Eubanks weighed in at 127.2 pounds, 1.2 pounds over the flyweight non-title fight limit of 126 and she was fined 20 percent of her purse, which went to her opponent Modafferi. She won the fight via unanimous decision.

A rematch with Aspen Ladd took place on May 18, 2019, at UFC Fight Night 152. Eubanks lost to Ladd for the second time by unanimous decision. This fight earned her the Fight of the Night award.

Eubanks faced Bethe Correia at UFC on ESPN+ 17. She lost the fight by unanimous decision.

Eubanks was scheduled to face Sarah Moras on April 18, 2020, at UFC 249. However, on April 9, Dana White, the president of UFC announced that this event was postponed and rescheduled to May 13, 2020, at UFC Fight Night: Smith vs. Teixeira. She won the fight via unanimous decision.

Eubanks was scheduled to face Macy Chiasson on September 5, 2020, at UFC Fight Night 176. However, Chiasson pulled out of the fight for undisclosed medical reasons and was replaced by Karol Rosa. Rosa pulled out on September 3 due to complications related to her weight cut. Eubanks competed a week later at UFC Fight Night 177 on September 12, 2020, against Julia Avila. She won the fight via unanimous decision.

As the first fight of her new contract with the UFC, Eubanks was scheduled for a quick turnaround (replacing injured Marion Reneau) and faced Ketlen Vieira on September 27, 2020, at UFC 253. She lost the fight via unanimous decision.

Eubanks faced Pannie Kianzad on December 19, 2020, at UFC Fight Night 183. She lost the fight via unanimous decision.

Eubanks was scheduled to face Karol Rosa on June 12, 2021, at UFC 263. However, Rosa pulled out of the fight in late-May citing an injury. In turn, Eubanks was removed from the card and instead faced promotional newcomer Elise Reed on July 24, 2021, at UFC on ESPN 27. Eubanks won the fight via technical knockout in round one.

Eubanks was scheduled to face Luana Carolina, replacing Maryna Moroz, on October 16, 2021, at UFC Fight Night 195. In turn Eubanks was pulled from the event due to Covid-19 protocol and she was replaced by Lupita Godinez.

Eubanks faced Melissa Gatto on December 18, 2021, at UFC Fight Night: Lewis vs. Daukaus. At the weigh-ins, Eubanks weighed in at 127.5 pounds, 1.5 pounds over the flyweight non-title fight limit. The bout proceeded at a catchweight. She lost the fight via body kick TKO in the third round.

Eubanks was scheduled to face Maryna Moroz on July 9, 2022, at UFC Fight Night 209. However, the pair was moved to UFC Fight Night 210 on September 17, 2022, for undisclosed reasons. In early September, Moroz was rebooked against Jennifer Maia at UFC Fight Night 215 on November 19, 2022. In late August, Eubanks withdrew from the event for undisclosed reasons with the promotion seeking a new opponent for Moroz.

Eubanks was scheduled to face Priscila Cachoeira on January 14, 2023, at UFC Fight Night 217. However, at the weigh-ins it was announced that Eubanks was forced to withdraw due to complications with her weight cut.

It was announced in mid-January 2023 that Eubanks was released by UFC.

== Professional grappling career ==
Eubanks was invited to compete a 135lbs grappling tournament at Rise Invitational 11 on April 1, 2023.

== Personal life ==
Eubanks is an openly lesbian athlete.

In February 2021, Eubanks came under fire from many MMA fans and media after a video was posted to her Twitter page that showed Eubanks in a physical confrontation with her former live-in partner, Lilly Ruiz, in front of their child. In a statement posted to her Instagram page, Eubanks claimed that she was the victim of domestic violence and denied any claims that she was abusive to any partners. No charges were filed.

In June 2024, Eubanks married her partner of two years, Angelyce Serrano, in a private ceremony.

== Championships and accomplishments ==
- Ultimate Fighting Championship
  - Fight of the Night (One time) vs. Aspen Ladd
  - UFC.com Awards
    - 2018: Ranked #10 Newcomer of the Year

== Mixed martial arts record ==
Professional record breakdown
14 matches	7 wins	7 losses
By knockout	3	1
By decision	4	6

Res.	Record	Opponent	Method	Event	Date	Round	Time	Location	Notes
Loss	7–7	Melissa Gatto	TKO (body kick and punches)	UFC Fight Night: Lewis vs. Daukaus	December 18, 2021	3	0:45	Las Vegas, Nevada, United States	Catchweight (127.5 lb) bout; Eubanks missed weight.
Win	7–6	Elise Reed	TKO (punches)	UFC on ESPN: Sandhagen vs. Dillashaw	July 24, 2021	1	3:49	Las Vegas, Nevada, United States	Return to Flyweight.
Loss	6–6	Pannie Kianzad	Decision (unanimous)	UFC Fight Night: Thompson vs. Neal	December 19, 2020	3	5:00	Las Vegas, Nevada, United States	
Loss	6–5	Ketlen Vieira	Decision (unanimous)	UFC 253	September 27, 2020	3	5:00	Abu Dhabi, United Arab Emirates	
Win	6–4	Julia Avila	Decision (unanimous)	UFC Fight Night: Waterson vs. Hill	September 12, 2020	3	5:00	Las Vegas, Nevada, United States	
Win	5–4	Sarah Moras	Decision (unanimous)	UFC Fight Night: Smith vs. Teixeira	May 13, 2020	3	5:00	Jacksonville, Florida, United States	
Loss	4–4	Bethe Correia	Decision (unanimous)	UFC Fight Night: Rodríguez vs. Stephens	September 21, 2019	3	5:00	Mexico City, Mexico	
Loss	4–3	Aspen Ladd	Decision (unanimous)	UFC Fight Night: dos Anjos vs. Lee	May 18, 2019	3	5:00	Rochester, New York, United States	Return to Bantamweight. Fight of the Night.
Win	4–2	Roxanne Modafferi	Decision (unanimous)	UFC 230	November 3, 2018	3	5:00	New York City, New York, United States	Catchweight (127.2 lb) bout; Eubanks missed weight.
Win	3–2	Lauren Murphy	Decision (unanimous)	UFC Fight Night: Rivera vs. Moraes	June 1, 2018	3	5:00	Utica, New York, United States	Return to Flyweight.
Loss	2–2	Aspen Ladd	Decision (unanimous)	Invicta FC 21: Anderson vs. Tweet	January 14, 2017	3	5:00	Kansas City, Missouri, United States	
Win	2–1	Amber Lynn	TKO (punches and elbows)	Invicta FC 18: Grasso vs. Esquibel	July 29, 2016	1	4:41	Kansas City, Missouri, United States	Return to Bantamweight.
Loss	1–1	Katlyn Chookagian	Decision (unanimous)	Cage Fury Fighting Championships 52	October 31, 2015	3	5:00	Atlantic City, New Jersey, United States	Flyweight debut.
Win	1–0	Gina Begley	TKO (punches)	Invicta FC 12: Kankaanpää vs. Souza	April 24, 2015	1	4:59	Kansas City, Missouri, United States	Bantamweight debut.

Exhibition record breakdown		
3 matches	3 wins	0 losses
By knockout	2	0
By decision	1	0

Res.	Record	Opponent	Method	Event	Date	Round	Time	Location	Notes
Win	3–0	Roxanne Modafferi	Decision (unanimous)	The Ultimate Fighter: A New World Champion	November 29, 2017 (air date)	3	5:00	Las Vegas, Nevada, United States	TUF 26 Semi-final round.
Win	2–0	DeAnna Bennett	KO (head kick)	The Ultimate Fighter: A New World Champion	November 8, 2017 (air date)	1	1:25	Las Vegas, Nevada, United States	TUF 26 Quarter-final round.
Win	1–0	Maia Stevenson	Submission (kimura)	The Ultimate Fighter: A New World Champion	September 27, 2017 (air date)	2	1:52	Las Vegas, Nevada, United States	TUF 26 preliminary round.
