= Brogan =

Brogan, or O'Brogan, is a surname originating in Ireland. The form "McBrogan" is also present, sharing the meaning of O'Brogan, essentially "son of Brogan."

The name is an anglicized form of the Irish Ó Brógáin ("descendants of Brógán"), probably from a diminutive of bróg ("shoe"), which is ultimately from the Old Norse brók ("breeches").

The name has also been traced back to the ancient King Breogán, and Saint Brogan (Broccán Clóen), Saint Patrick's nephew and scribe.

It has many original meanings, including sorrowful, sharp-faced, sturdy and strong.

Traditionally, Brogan has also been used as a first name for boys, after the saint.

== Notable people with the surname ==
- Alan Brogan, Irish footballer
- Benedict Brogan, English journalist
- Bernard Brogan (junior), Irish footballer
- Bernard Brogan (senior), Irish footballer
- Bill Brogan, Australian rugby league footballer
- Colm Brogan, Scottish journalist and political pamphleteer
- Denis William Brogan (1900–1974), Scottish historian
- Frank Brogan, American politician
- Hugh Brogan (1936–2019), British historian
- Jack Brogan (1930–2022), American art fabricator
- James Brogan (footballer born 1865), Scottish footballer
- James Brogan (footballer born 1890), Scottish footballer
- Jim Brogan (basketball), American basketball player
- Jim Brogan (Gaelic footballer), Irish Gaelic footballer
- Jim Brogan (Scottish footballer), Scottish footballer
- John Brogan (footballer born 1958), Scottish footballer
- Joseph Brogan, American politician, Missouri senator
- Mervyn Brogan, Australian army officer
- Michelle Brogan, Australian basketball player
- Mike Brogan, author's pseudonym
- Nicola Brogan, Northern Irish politician
- Stephen Brogan, English footballer
- William Brogan, Australian rugby player

== Notable people with the given name ==
- Brogan Bambrogan, American businessman
- Brogan Crowley (born 1994), British skeleton athlete
- Brogan Evans (born 1996/1997), Welsh rugby league player
- Brogan Finlay (born 2002), American professional wrestler
- Brogan Hay (born 1999), Scottish footballer
- Brogan Rafferty (born 1995), American professional ice hockey player
- Brogan Rafferty (serial killer) (born 1994), American serial killer
- Brogan Roback (born 1994), American football quarterback
- Brogan Walker (born 1988), American mixed martial artist
