= Brogan (disambiguation) =

Brogan is an Irish surname.

Brogan may also refer to:

- Brogan (shoes), a heavy, ankle-high shoe or boot
- Brogan, Oregon, unincorporated community in Oregon, USA
- Brogan Group, an international group of access companies operating in the United Kingdom, Ireland, Saudi Arabia and the United Arab Emirates
- Saint Brogan, an Irish cleric who lived in the sixth or seventh century
