= The Ultimate Fighter: Team Peña vs. Team Nunes =

UFC mixed martial arts television series

- Also known as: The Ultimate Fighter 30
- Genre: Reality, Sports
- Created by: Frank Fertitta III; Lorenzo Fertitta; Dana White
- Starring: Dana White; Julianna Peña; Amanda Nunes
- Country of origin: United States

Production
- Running time: 60 minutes

Original release
- Network: ESPN+
- Release: May 3 – July 19, 2022

Related
- The Return of The Ultimate Fighter: Team Volkanovski vs. Team Ortega; The Ultimate Fighter: Team McGregor vs. Team Chandler

The Ultimate Fighter: Team Peña vs. Team Nunes (also known as The Ultimate Fighter 30 and TUF 30) is a 2022 installment of the Ultimate Fighting Championship (UFC)-produced reality television series The Ultimate Fighter on ESPN+. Former UFC women's bantamweight champion and current UFC women's featherweight champion Amanda Nunes and UFC women's bantamweight champion Julianna Peña will coach the season of TUF and the show will feature contestants at heavyweights and women's flyweights will be featured on the season. The pair was initially expected to meet on August 7, 2021, at UFC 265 in a title bout, However, Nunes tested positive for COVID-19 on July 29 and the bout was cancelled. The fight was rescheduled and eventually took place at UFC 269 on December 11, 2021 where Peña won the championship by submitting Nunes. The two coaches met again for the bantamweight title at UFC 277, where Nunes regained her title in a unanimous decision.

The UFC announced the TUF 30 would be broadcast by ESPN+ starting May 3, 2022.

== Cast ==
=== Coaches ===
Team Peña:

- Julianna Peña, Head Coach

Team Nunes:

- Amanda Nunes, Head Coach

=== Fighters ===
- Team Peña
  - Heavyweights: Mohammed Usman, Zac Pauga, Jordan Heiderman and Bobby Maximus.
  - Women's Flyweights: Helen Peralta, Juliana Miller, Hannah Guy and Chantel Coates (*Laura Gallardo)
    - Coates was unable to make weight and was replaced on episode 4 by Gallardo.
- Team Nunes
  - Heavyweights: Eduardo Perez, Chandler Cole, Mitchell Sipe and Nyle Bartling.
  - Women's Flyweights: Claire Guthrie, Brogan Walker-Sanchez, Kaytlin Neil and Kathryn Paprocki.

== Episodes ==
Episode 1: Road to the Rematch (May 3, 2022)

- Some of the fighters have their last moments with their relatives before officially joining the competition.
- Both coaches get a chance to evaluate the fighters before picking teams. They draw strategies regarding their targets.
- UFC President Dana White welcome the contestants and coaches at the UFC Apex. He explains that to celebrate the 30th season of the show, he decided to have former UFC Light Heavyweight Champion and The Ultimate Fighter 1 light heavyweight winner Forrest Griffin be a part of the season. He explains the mechanics of how things will work — winners fight at the live finale, winners there will earn UFC contracts — and explains his path to joining the cast for the historic inaugural season of the show 18 years ago. He encourages the competitors to make the most of the experience.
- Nunes wins the coin toss and chose to pick the first fighter. That means Peña would have the first fight pick and the fighters were picked in the following order:

Coach	1st Pick	2nd Pick	3rd Pick	4th Pick	5th Pick	6th Pick	7th Pick	8th Pick
Nunes	Claire Guthrie (WFW)	Eduardo Perez (HW)	Brogan Walker (WFW)	Chandler Cole (HW)	Kaytlin Neil (WFW)	Mitchell Sipe (HW)	Kathryn Paprocki (WFW)	Nyle Bartling (HW)
Peña	Helen Peralta (WFW)	Mohammed Usman (HW)	Juliana Miller (WFW)	Zac Pauga (HW)	Hannah Guy (WFW)	Jordan Heiderman (HW)	Chantel Coates (WFW)	Bobby Maximus (HW)

- The following day is the first day of training and the first fight will be selected as well. Peña chose her No. 2 pick Zac Pauga to take on Team Nunes' No. 4 pick Nyle Bartling in a heavyweight matchup.
- Zac Pauga defeated Nyle Bartling via unanimous decision after two rounds.
- Team Peña retained control of fight selection, and with a women's flyweight bout up next, she selected her No. 1 pick Helen Peralta to fight Nunes' No. 3 pick Kaytlin Neil.

Episode 2: Time To Eat (May 10, 2022)

- Bartling struggles with his loss. He and Pauga discuss their fight and feelings outside of it. Meanwhile, Kaytling Neil talks about her relationship with Peña outside of the show and experiencing mixed emotions about getting to fight and being tabbed to take on Peña's no. 1 pick, and wants to know the thinking behind making this particular fight.
- Two days before the fight, Neil is crying in the dressing room as Nunes and her wife/fellow UFC fighter Nina Nunes arrive. She explains that her father died after a lengthy battle with addiction issues. Neil says to her coaches that she's not worried about the fight, but frustrated and challenged by the timing of things.
- Kaytlin Neil defeated Helen Peralta via split decision after three rounds.
- Team Nunes now has control and selects her No. 3 pick Mitchell Sipe to fight Peña's No. 1 pick Mohammed Usman, setting up a fight that was supposed to happen on the regional circuit a few years ago.

Episode 3: Boiling Point (May 17, 2022)

- Mohammed Usman defeated Mitchell Sipe by unanimous decision after going to a third round.

Episode 4: Opportunity Knocks (May 24, 2022)

- The next women's flyweight bout was set to be Chantal Coates vs Brogan Walker, however Coates was approximately 25 lbs over weight just a few days before the weigh-ins and the Pena coaches decided that it would be too unhealthy to even try to cut that weight in time. Coates was removed from the competition and replaced with Laura Gallardo.
- Since the Pena fighter was changed, Amanda Nunes was given the option of keeping or changing the fight. Since Brogan Walker was mending an injured knee they chose to have Kathryn Paprocki fight Laura Gallardo instead.
- Laura Gallardo defeated Kathryn Paprocki by majority decision after 2 rounds.

Episode 5: Face the Boogeyman (May 31, 2022)

- Team Nunes' number one pick Eduardo Perez defeated Rob MacDonald by TKO (punches and elbows) at 3:58 of the first round.

Episode 6: We Meet Again (June 7, 2022)

- Juliana Miller and Claire Guthrie were set to fight in a rematch of their May 21, 2021 Invicta match that Guthrie won by unanimous decision. Juliana holds some resentment from that fight that she felt she won. Guthrie commented that she knew what the judges were looking for in the fight and made it part of her game plan.
- Juliana Miller defeated Claire Guthrie by a unanimous decision after 3 rounds.

Episode 7: Crush Your Dreams (June 14, 2022)

- Jordan Heiderman defeated Chandler Cole by TKO (punches) at 1:16 of round 3.

Episode 8: Make It Ugly (June 21, 2022)

- Brogan Walker defeated Hannah Guy by a majority decision after 2 rounds.

Episode 9: Bring Your Lunchbox (June 28, 2022)

- The coaches challenge was an Axe throwing competition consisting of 5 rounds. Amanda Nunes was beating Julianna Peña by a score of 24–10 in round 5 so Peña needed three straight bullseyes to win and could not do it. Nunes won the $10,000 coaches prize and each person on her team won $1,500.
- Zac Pauga defeated Jordan Heiderman in the first heavyweight semi-final by TKO at 0:37 of the 2nd round.

Episode 10: Throw Nasty Stuff (July 5, 2022)

- Brogan Walker defeated Laura Gallardo by unanimous decision after 3 rounds.

Episode 11: Time to Come Alive (July 12, 2022)

- Mohammed Usman defeated Eduardo Perez by split decision after 3 rounds.

Episode 12: Life or Death (July 19, 2022)

- Juliana Miller defeated Kaytlin Neil by Kimura submission at 3:34 of round 2.

TUF 30 Finale (August 6, 2022)

- The finale for both weight classes was part of UFC on ESPN: Santos vs. Hill

== Tournament bracket ==
=== Heavyweight bracket ===
Quarter-finals
Zac Pauga	UD
Nyle Bartling	2
Jordan Heiderman	TKO
Chandler Cole	3
Eduardo Perez	TKO
Bobby Maximus	1
Mohammed Usman	UD
Mitchell Sipe	3

Semi-finals
Zac Pauga	TKO
Jordan Heiderman	2
Eduardo Perez	3
Mohammed Usman	SD

Final
Zac Pauga	2
Mohammad Usman	KO

=== Women's Flyweight bracket ===
Quarter-finals
Hannah Guy	MD
Brogan Walker-Sanchez	2
Laura Gallardo	MD
Kathryn Paprocki	2
Helen Peralta	SD
Kaytlin Neil	3
Juliana Miller	UD
Claire Guthrie	3

Semi-finals
Brogan Walker-Sanchez	UD
Laura Gallardo	3
Juliana Miller	SUB
Kaytlin Neil	2

Final
Brogan Walker-Sanchez	3
Juliana Miller	TKO

	Team Peña
	Team Nunes
UD	Unanimous Decision
MD	Majority Decision
SD	Split Decision
SUB	Submission
(T)KO	(Technical) Knock Out

== See also ==
- The Ultimate Fighter
- List of UFC events
- 2022 in UFC
- List of current UFC fighters
