= Gillian Robertson =

Canadian mixed martial artist (born 1995)

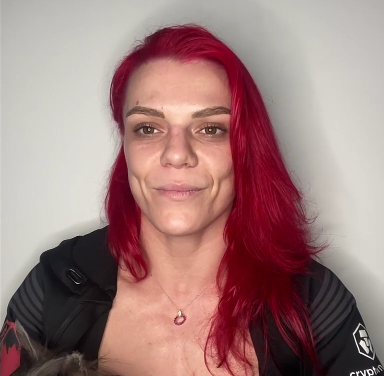
- Robertson in 2024
- Born: Gillian Elizabeth Robertson; May 17, 1995 (age 31); Niagara Falls, Ontario, Canada
- Other names: The Savage
- Height: 5 ft 5 in (1.65 m)
- Weight: 115 lb (52 kg; 8 st 3 lb)
- Division: Strawweight (2016, 2023–present); Flyweight (2016–2022)
- Reach: 63 in (160 cm)
- Style: Brazilian Jiu-Jitsu, Kickboxing
- Fighting out of: Port Saint Lucie, Florida, U.S.
- Team: American Top Team (2011–2020); The GOAT Shed Academy (2022–present)
- Trainer: Head coach - Daniel Donaldson; BJJ coach - Din Thomas
- Rank: Black belt in Brazilian Jiu-Jitsu under Din Thomas
- Years active: 2016–present

Mixed martial arts record
- Total: 26
- Wins: 17
- By knockout: 3
- By submission: 9
- By decision: 5
- Losses: 9
- By knockout: 1
- By submission: 1
- By decision: 7

Amateur record
- Total: 11
- Wins: 10
- By submission: 5
- By decision: 5
- Losses: 1

Other information
- Mixed martial arts record from Sherdog

Gillian Elizabeth Robertson (born May 17, 1995) is a Canadian professional mixed martial artist. She currently competes in the women's Strawweight division of the Ultimate Fighting Championship (UFC) where she holds the UFC women's record for most submission wins (7) and is tied for the UFC women's record for most finishes (10). As of August 15, 2026, she is #5 in the Meta UFC women's strawweight rankings.

== Background ==
Robertson was born in Niagara Falls, Ontario, Canada. She started cardio kickboxing training at the age of 16 at American Top Team. She then joined MMA classes after a few months and started competing two years later.

== Mixed martial arts career ==
=== Early career ===
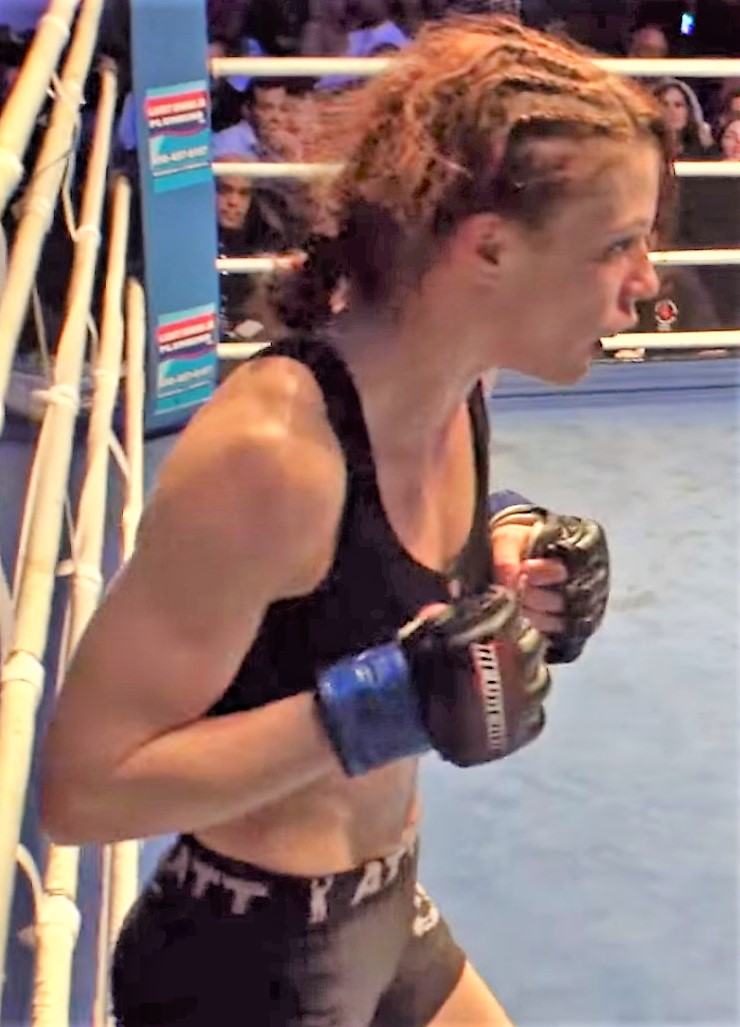
Robertson in a match in 2016

Robertson started her professional MMA career in 2016 after amassing a record of 9–1 in amateur fights. After fighting in five professional bouts she participated in The Ultimate Fighter 26 competition series and was subsequently signed by the UFC after the show.

=== The Ultimate Fighter ===
In August 2017, it was announced that Robertson was one of the fighters featured on The Ultimate Fighter 26, UFC TV series, where the process to crown the UFC's inaugural 125-pound women's champion will take place.

In the preliminary fights, Robertson faced Barb Honchak and lost the fight via TKO in the second round.

=== Ultimate Fighting Championship ===
Robertson made her UFC debut on December 1, 2017, on The Ultimate Fighter 26 Finale against Emily Whitmire. She won the fight via a submission in round one.

Her next fight came on May 27, 2018, at UFC Fight Night 130 against Molly McCann. At the weigh-ins, McCann weighed in at 127 pounds, 1 pound over the flyweight non-title fight limit of 126. She was fined 20 percent of her purse, which went to Robertson. She won the fight via a rear-naked choke in round two.

On September 22, 2018, Robertson faced Mayra Bueno Silva at UFC Fight Night 137. She lost the fight via a submission in round one.

Robertson faced Veronica Macedo on February 23, 2019, at UFC Fight Night 145. She won the fight via submission in the second round.

Robertson faced Sarah Frota on July 27, 2019, at UFC 240. She won the fight via technical knockout in round two.

In the lead up to the Frota fight, Robertson would begin training with Jose Torres and coach Din Thomas at ATT. This was beginning of their partnership once Thomas and the two fighters left ATT.

Robertson faced Maycee Barber on October 18, 2019, at UFC on ESPN 6. She lost the fight via technical knockout in round one.

Robertson was expected to face Taila Santos on June 20, 2020, at UFC on ESPN 11. Due to undisclosed reasons, Robertson's opponent changed and she instead faced Cortney Casey. She won the fight via a rear-naked choke submission in round three.

Ahead of her fight with Botelho, Robertson was given her black belt in Brazilian Jiu Jitsu by coach Din Thomas. Robertson described the event as emotional and joyous after nine years of work.

During the COVID-19 pandemic Robertson left American Top Team with her head coach, Din Thomas and teammate Jose Torres.

Robertson faced Poliana Botelho on October 18, 2020, at UFC Fight Night 180. She won the fight via unanimous decision.

Robertson was scheduled to face Andrea Lee on December 12, 2020, at UFC 256. However, Lee pulled out in early December due to a broken nose and Robertson faced Taila Santos instead at UFC Fight Night: Thompson vs. Neal. Robertson lost the fight via unanimous decision.

Robertson was next expected to face Miranda Maverick at UFC 258 on February 13, 2021. However, hours before the fight, Robertson had a non-COVID related illness and the bout was cancelled. The pair eventually was reschedule to UFC 260 on March 27, 2021. Robertson lost the fight via unanimous decision.

Robertson faced Priscila Cachoeira on December 11, 2021, at UFC 269. At the weigh-ins, Cachoeira weighed in at 129 pounds, three pounds over the flyweight non-title fight limit. The bout proceeded at catchweight with Cachoeira fined 30% of her purse, which went to Robertson. Robertson won the fight via a rear-naked choke submission in the first round.

Robertson faced JJ Aldrich, replacing Ariane Lipski, on March 12, 2022, at UFC Fight Night 203. She lost the fight via unanimous decision.

Robertson was scheduled to face Melissa Gatto on September 17, 2022, at UFC Fight Night 210. However, Gatto was removed from the event for undisclosed reasons, and she was replaced by Mariya Agapova. Robertson won the fight via rear-naked choke.

Robertson faced Piera Rodríguez on April 15, 2023, at UFC on ESPN 44. She won the fight via an armbar submission in the second round. This win earned her the Performance of the Night award.

Robertson faced Tabatha Ricci on June 24, 2023, at UFC on ABC 5. She lost the bout via unanimous decision.

Robertson faced Polyana Viana on January 20, 2024, at UFC 297. She won by technical knockout in the second round after dominating most of the bout on the ground. This fight earned her the Performance of the Night award.

Robertson was expected to face Michelle Waterson-Gomez on June 1, 2024, at UFC 302. However, for unknown reasons, the bout was moved to June 29, 2024 at UFC 303. Robertson controlled the majority of the bout on the ground and won the fight by unanimous decision.

Robertson faced Luana Pinheiro on November 9, 2024, at UFC Fight Night 247. With a lot of ground control time, she won the fight by unanimous decision. She was also noted as having thrown the first legal 12–6 elbow under the Unified Rules of Mixed Martial Arts, since they were legalised on 1 November 2024, in this fight.

Robertson faced Marina Rodriguez on May 3, 2025, at UFC on ESPN 67. She won the fight by technical knockout in the second round.

Robertson was scheduled to face Iasmin Lucindo at UFC on ESPN 73 in Las Vegas, Nevada on December 13, 2025. However, Lucindo withdrew due to an undisclosed injury and was replaced by former UFC Women's Strawweight Championship challenger Amanda Lemos. Subsequently, Lemos was removed from the card by the Nevada Athletic Commission on the day of the event due to a mouth injury.

Robertson ended up facing Lemos at UFC Fight Night 269 at March 14, 2026. She won the fight by unanimous decision.

Robertson competed for the UFC Women's Strawweight Championship against champion Mackenzie Dern on August 15, 2026 at UFC 330. She lost the fight by unanimous decision.

== Professional grappling career ==
=== 2020–2021 ===
Robertson has competed for the professional grappling promotion Submission Underground on several occasions while her MMA career was ongoing. At SUG 17 on August 30, 2020, she faced Amanda Loewen and lost by armbar in EBI overtime. She returned at SUG 20 for the promotion's end of year event on December 30, 2020, and submitted Pearl Gonzalez with a rear-naked choke inside regulation time. At SUG 22 on April 25, 2021, Robertson faced Liz Tracy and was lost by armbar in EBI overtime. She then returned at SUG 23 on May 23, 2021, where she faced top BJJ competitor Raquel Canuto and was submitted with a guillotine in regulation time. At SUG 26 on August 15, 2021, Robertson faced fellow UFC veteran and former UFC Women's Flyweight Championship challenger Katlyn Chookagian and won by fastest escape time in EBI overtime.

Robertson also took part in a bantamweight Combat Jiu-Jitsu tournament at Medusa 1 on October 2, 2021, getting submitted with a kneebar in the opening round by Nikki Sullivan. She faced Chrissy Briggs in a grappling match on the preliminary card of Fury Pro Grappling 3 on December 30, 2021, winning a unanimous decision victory.

=== 2022–2024 ===
Robertson returned to the promotion at Fury Pro Grappling 6 on December 30, 2022, to face former two-time UFC Women's Strawweight Champion Rose Namajunas in the main event, submitting her with a rear-naked choke in 65 seconds.

Robertson competed against Montana De La Rosa in the main event of Pit Submission Series 3 on March 23, 2024. She won via unanimous decision.

== Championships and accomplishments ==
=== Mixed martial arts ===
- Ultimate Fighting Championship
  - Performance of the Night (Two times) vs. Piera Rodríguez and Polyana Viana
  - Most finishes in UFC Women's Flyweight division history (7)
  - Most submission wins in UFC Women's history (7)
    - Most submission wins in UFC Women's Flyweight division history (6)
  - Tied (Amanda Nunes) for most finishes in UFC Women's history (10)
  - Tied (Ariane da Silva) for fifth most bouts in UFC Women's Flyweight division history (13)
  - Fourth most wins in UFC Women's history (14)
  - Fifth most takedowns landed in UFC Women's Flyweight division history (21)
  - Tied (Manon Fiorot, Erin Blanchfield & Miranda Maverick) for fourth most wins in UFC Women's Flyweight division history (8)
  - Highest top position percentage in UFC Women's Flyweight division history (41.9%)
    - Highest top position percentage in UFC Women's Strawweight division history (50.8%)
  - Third most control time in UFC Women's Flyweight division history (54:16) (behind Valentina Shevchenko)
  - Second highest control time percentage in UFC Women's Flyweight division history (45.6%)
    - Second highest control time percentage in UFC Women's Strawweight division history (57.1%) (behind Tatiana Suarez)
  - Third most top position time in UFC Women's Flyweight division history (50:57)
    - Sixth most top position time in UFC Women's Strawweight division history (43:03)
  - Tied (Montana De La Rosa, Andrea Lee, Viviane Araújo & Karine Silva) for second most submission attempts in UFC Women's Flyweight division history (8)
  - UFC.com Awards
    - 2023: Ranked #10 Submission of the Year vs. Piera Rodríguez
- MMA Fighting
  - 2024 First Team MMA All-Star

== Mixed martial arts record ==
Professional record breakdown
26 matches	17 wins	9 losses
By knockout	3	1
By submission	9	1
By decision	5	7

Res.	Record	Opponent	Method	Event	Date	Round	Time	Location	Notes
Loss	17–9	Mackenzie Dern	Decision (unanimous)	UFC 330	August 15, 2026	5	5:00	Philadelphia, Pennsylvania, United States	For the UFC Women's Strawweight Championship.
Win	17–8	Amanda Lemos	Decision (unanimous)	UFC Fight Night: Emmett vs. Vallejos	March 14, 2026	3	5:00	Las Vegas, Nevada, United States	
Win	16–8	Marina Rodriguez	TKO (punches)	UFC on ESPN: Sandhagen vs. Figueiredo	May 3, 2025	2	2:07	Des Moines, Iowa, United States	
Win	15–8	Luana Pinheiro	Decision (unanimous)	UFC Fight Night: Magny vs. Prates	November 9, 2024	3	5:00	Las Vegas, Nevada, United States	
Win	14–8	Michelle Waterson-Gomez	Decision (unanimous)	UFC 303	June 29, 2024	3	5:00	Las Vegas, Nevada, United States	
Win	13–8	Polyana Viana	TKO (punches)	UFC 297	January 20, 2024	2	3:12	Toronto, Ontario, Canada	Performance of the Night.
Loss	12–8	Tabatha Ricci	Decision (unanimous)	UFC on ABC: Emmett vs. Topuria	June 24, 2023	3	5:00	Jacksonville, Florida, United States	
Win	12–7	Piera Rodríguez	Submission (armbar)	UFC on ESPN: Holloway vs. Allen	April 15, 2023	2	4:21	Kansas City, Missouri, United States	Return to Strawweight. Performance of the Night.
Win	11–7	Mariya Agapova	Technical Submission (rear-naked choke)	UFC Fight Night: Sandhagen vs. Song	September 17, 2022	2	2:19	Las Vegas, Nevada, United States	
Loss	10–7	JJ Aldrich	Decision (unanimous)	UFC Fight Night: Santos vs. Ankalaev	March 12, 2022	3	5:00	Las Vegas, Nevada, United States	
Win	10–6	Priscila Cachoeira	Submission (rear-naked choke)	UFC 269	December 11, 2021	1	4:59	Las Vegas, Nevada, United States	Catchweight (129 lb) bout; Cachoeira missed weight.
Loss	9–6	Miranda Maverick	Decision (unanimous)	UFC 260	March 27, 2021	3	5:00	Las Vegas, Nevada, United States	
Loss	9–5	Taila Santos	Decision (unanimous)	UFC Fight Night: Thompson vs. Neal	December 19, 2020	3	5:00	Las Vegas, Nevada, United States	
Win	9–4	Poliana Botelho	Decision (unanimous)	UFC Fight Night: Ortega vs. The Korean Zombie	October 18, 2020	3	5:00	Abu Dhabi, United Arab Emirates	
Win	8–4	Cortney Casey	Submission (rear-naked choke)	UFC on ESPN: Blaydes vs. Volkov	June 20, 2020	3	4:36	Las Vegas, Nevada, United States	
Loss	7–4	Maycee Barber	TKO (punches)	UFC on ESPN: Reyes vs. Weidman	October 18, 2019	1	3:04	Boston, Massachusetts, United States	
Win	7–3	Sarah Frota	TKO (elbows)	UFC 240	July 27, 2019	2	4:13	Edmonton, Alberta, Canada	
Win	6–3	Veronica Macedo	Submission (rear naked choke)	UFC Fight Night: Błachowicz vs. Santos	February 23, 2019	2	3:27	Prague, Czech Republic	
Loss	5–3	Mayra Bueno Silva	Submission (armbar)	UFC Fight Night: Santos vs. Anders	September 22, 2018	1	4:55	São Paulo, Brazil	
Win	5–2	Molly McCann	Technical Submission (rear-naked choke)	UFC Fight Night: Thompson vs. Till	May 27, 2018	2	2:05	Liverpool, England	
Win	4–2	Emily Whitmire	Submission (armbar)	The Ultimate Fighter: A New World Champion Finale	December 1, 2017	1	2:12	Las Vegas, Nevada, United States	Return to Flyweight.
Win	3–2	Hannah Cifers	Submission (rear-naked choke)	Next Level Fight Club 7	May 13, 2017	2	4:12	Raleigh, North Carolina, United States	Catchweight (116.5 lb) bout; Robertson missed weight.
Loss	2–2	Cynthia Calvillo	Decision (unanimous)	Global Knockout 8	November 19, 2016	3	3:00	Jackson, California, United States	Catchweight (120 lb) bout.
Win	2–1	Miki Rogers	Submission (armbar)	Atlas Fights 29	October 22, 2016	1	4:16	Biloxi, Mississippi, United States	Return to Strawweight.
Win	1–1	Monica Medina	Decision (unanimous)	Blood and Sand 20	August 13, 2016	3	3:00	Biloxi, Mississippi, United States	Flyweight debut.
Loss	0–1	Hannah Goldy	Decision (unanimous)	Island Fights 37	March 11, 2016	3	3:00	Pensacola, Florida, United States	Strawweight debut.

Exhibition record breakdown		
1 match	0 wins	1 loss
By knockout	0	1

Res.	Record	Opponent	Method	Event	Date	Round	Time	Location	Notes
Loss	0–1	Barb Honchak	TKO (punches and elbows)	The Ultimate Fighter: A New World Champion	October 4, 2017 (air date)	2	2:27	Las Vegas, Nevada, United States	The Ultimate Fighter 26 Preliminary round

== Submission grappling record ==
Professional record breakdown
9 matches	5 wins	4 losses
By submission	2	4
By decision	3	0

Result	Record	Opponent	Method	Event	Division	Type	Year	Location
Win	5–4	(United States) Montana De La Rosa	Decision (unanimous)	Pit Submission Series 3			March 23, 2024	Cancun, Mexico
Win	4–4	(United States) Rose Namajunas	Submission (rear-naked choke)	Fury Pro Grappling 6	Superfight	No-Gi	December 30, 2022	(United States) Philadelphia, PA
Win	3–4	(United States) Chrissy Briggs	Decision (unanimous)	Fury Pro Grappling 3			December 30, 2021	(United States) Philadelphia, PA
Loss	2–4	(United States) Nikki Sullivan	Submission (kneebar)	Medusa 1			October 2, 2021	Cancún, Mexico
Win	2–3	(United States) Katlyn Chookagian	Fastest escape time in overtime	Submission Underground 26			August 15, 2021	(United States) Portland, OR
Loss	1–3	(United States) Raquel Canuto	Submission (guillotine choke)	Submission Underground 23			May 23, 2021	(United States) Portland, OR
Loss	1–2	(United States) Liz Tracy	Submission in overtime (armbar)	Submission Underground 22			April 25, 2021	(United States) Portland, OR
Win	1–1	(United States) Pearl Gonzalez	Submission (rear-naked choke)	Submission Underground 20			December 30, 2020	(United States) Portland, OR
Loss	0–1	(United States) Amanda Loewen	Submission in overtime (armbar)	Submission Underground 17			August 30, 2022	(United States) Portland, OR

== See also ==
- List of current UFC fighters
- List of female mixed martial artists
- List of Canadian UFC fighters
