= Senator Casey (disambiguation) =

Bob Casey Jr. (born 1960) is a U.S. Senator from Pennsylvania since 2007. Senator Casey may also refer to:

- Bob Casey Sr. (1932–2000), Pennsylvania State Senate
- Jack Casey (born 1935), New Jersey Senate
- Lyman R. Casey (1837–1914), U.S. Senator from North Dakota from 1889 to 1893
- Michael E. Casey (1870–1949), Missouri State Senate
- Samuel K. Casey (1818–1871), Illinois State Senate
- Thomas S. Casey (1832–1891), Illinois State Senate
- Zadok Casey (1796–1862), Illinois State Senate
