= John Brogan =

John Brogan may refer to Scottish association football players:

- John Brogan (footballer, born 1954), record goalscorer for St. Johnstone F.C.
- John Brogan (footballer, born 1958), defender for Clyde F.C.
