= Stephanie Geltmacher =

American mixed martial artist (born 1990)

- Born: August 21, 1990 (age 36); Honolulu, Hawaii, United States
- Other names: Hold Fast
- Height: 5 ft 1 in (1.55 m)
- Weight: 125 lb (57 kg; 8 st 13 lb)
- Division: Flyweight
- Reach: 63 in (160 cm)
- Style: Brazilian jiu-jitsu, Wrestling
- Fighting out of: Oklahoma City, Oklahoma, United States
- Team: Solid MMA Cobra BJJ
- Years active: 2016–present

Mixed martial arts record
- Total: 6
- Wins: 5
- By knockout: 2
- By decision: 3
- Losses: 1
- By decision: 1

Other information
- University: Yakima Valley College; Oklahoma City University
- Mixed martial arts record from Sherdog

Stephanie Geltmacher (born August 21, 1990) is an American mixed martial artist and currently she competes in the flyweight division. She has previously competed for Invicta Fighting Championships.

== Background ==
Aggressive as a child, Geltmacher's father suggested her to start some sort of martial art. She started training Brazilian jiu-jitsu at the age of ten and started wrestling in high school. She attended Yakima Valley College for a year and transferred to Oklahoma City University, being an All-American in wrestling in all four years. Not sure what to do after the college, she started training mixed martial arts with her boyfriend who already trained the sport.

== Mixed martial arts career ==
=== Early career ===
After going 3–1 as an amateur, Geltmacher amassed a record of 2–0 prior signed by Invicta Fighting Championships.

=== Invicta Fighting Championships ===
Geltmacher made her Invicta debut on July 21, 2018, against Kerri Kenneson, replacing Alexa Conners, at Invicta FC 30. She won the fight by technical knockout.

Her next fight came on November 16, 2018, facing Liz Tracy at Invicta FC 32. She won the fight via unanimous decision.

On August 9, 2019, Geltmacher faced Victoria Leonardo at Invicta FC 36. She lost the fight via unanimous decision.

After her first career loss, Geltmacher was scheduled to fight Erin Blanchfield at Invicta FC 41: Morandin vs. Ruiz on July 30, 2020. However, she withdrew from the bout and was replaced by Brogan Walker-Sanchez.

Geltmacher was then expected to face Trisha Cicero at Invicta FC 43 on November 20, 2020. However, Cicero was forced to withdraw and was replaced by Caitlin Sammons. Geltmacher won the fight via first-round knockout.

== Mixed martial arts record ==
Professional record breakdown
| 6 matches | 5 wins | 1 loss |
| By knockout | 2 | 0 |
| By decision | 3 | 1 |

| Res. | Record | Opponent | Method | Event | Date | Round | Time | Location | Notes |
|---|---|---|---|---|---|---|---|---|---|
| Win | 5–1 | Caitlin Sammons | KO (punches) | Invicta FC 43 | November 20, 2020 | 1 | 4:28 | Kansas City, Kansas, United States | |
| Loss | 4–1 | Victoria Leonardo | Decision (unanimous) | Invicta FC 36 | August 9, 2019 | 3 | 5:00 | Kansas City, Kansas, United States | |
| Win | 4–0 | Liz Tracy | Decision (unanimous) | Invicta FC 32 | November 16, 2018 | 3 | 5:00 | Shawnee, Oklahoma, United States | |
| Win | 3–0 | Kerri Kenneson | TKO (elbows) | Invicta FC 30 | July 21, 2018 | 1 | 3:32 | Kansas City, Missouri, United States | Bantamweight bout. |
| Win | 2–0 | Ky Bennett | Decision (unanimous) | Bellator 189 | December 1, 2017 | 3 | 5:00 | Thackerville, Oklahoma, United States | |
| Win | 1–0 | Dayona Haden | Decision (unanimous) | HD Boxing: Rampage at Remington | June 10, 2016 | 3 | 5:00 | Oklahoma City, Oklahoma, United States | Catchweight (130 lbs) bout. |
