= Pearl Gonzalez =

American mixed martial artist

- Born: August 12, 1986 (age 40); Chicago, Illinois, U.S.
- Other names: The Chi-Town Princess
- Height: 5 ft 4 in (1.63 m)
- Weight: 125 lb (57 kg; 8 st 13 lb)
- Division: Strawweight; Flyweight
- Reach: 68 in (173 cm)
- Style: 10th Planet Jiu-Jitsu, Boxing
- Fighting out of: San Diego, California, U.S.
- Team: 10th Planet San Diego (until 2021, 2022–present); Team Hurricane Awesome (2013–2021, 2022–present); Team Serrano (2021–2022)
- Rank: Brown Belt in 10th Planet Jiu-Jitsu
- Years active: 2012–present

Professional boxing record
- Total: 2
- Wins: 2
- By knockout: 1

Mixed martial arts record
- Total: 17
- Wins: 11
- By knockout: 1
- By submission: 6
- By decision: 4
- Losses: 6
- By submission: 1
- By decision: 5

Other information
- Mixed martial arts record from Sherdog

Pearl Gonzalez (born August 12, 1986) is an American mixed martial artist. She formerly competed for Ultimate Fighting Championships, and currently fights in the strawweight division of the Invicta Fighting Championships.

== Background ==
Gonzalez was born in Chicago, Illinois. Her parents were both drug and alcohol abusers, disturbing her childhood and adolescence. Her parents eventually separated, leaving Pearl with her father and rest of the siblings with their mother. Her father, after getting clean, placed her in combat sport classes when she was eleven years old. Gonzalez later trained in boxing, and won the Golden Gloves amateur championship in 2008. She stopped fighting for a while in order to raise her younger sister, but went back to fighting at 21 at Combat-Do in Cicero, IL under Grappling Hall of Famer Bob Schirmer. Pearl is currently the host of the Extra Rounds Podcast on UFC FIGHT PASS.

She is of Mexican, Puerto Rican, Filipino, Irish descent.

== Mixed martial arts career ==
=== Early career ===
Gonzalez started her amateur career in 2009, and fought professionally since 2012. She competed for the Xtreme Fighting Championship, Xtreme Fighting Organization, Splode Fight Series, and Hoosier Fight Club. Gonzalez amassed a record of 6–1 prior to being signed by UFC.

=== Ultimate Fighting Championships ===
Gonzalez made her promotional debut on April 8, 2017, at UFC 210 against Cynthia Calvillo. She lost the fight via rear-naked choke.

Her next fight came on October 7, 2017, facing Poliana Botelho at UFC 216. She lost the fight via unanimous decision.

After two losses at UFC, Gonzalez was released by UFC and she joined Invicta Fighting Championships shortly after.

=== Invicta Fighting Championships ===
Gonzalez made her promotional debut on March 24, 2018, at Invicta FC 28: Mizuki vs. Jandiroba against Kali Robbins. and she won the fight via unanimous decision.

Gonzalez faced Barbara Acioly on May 4, 2018, at Invicta FC 29: Kaufman vs. Lehner. She submitted Acioly and won the fight.

Gonzalez faced Daiane Firmino on September 1, 2018, at Invicta FC 31: Jandiroba vs. Morandin. She won the fight via unanimous decision.

Gonzalez faced Vanessa Porto for the vacant Invicta FC Flyweight Championship at Invicta FC 34 on February 15, 2019. She lost the fight via technical decision.

On October 4, 2019, Gonzalez faced Brogan Walker-Sanchez at Invicta FC 37. She won the fight via unanimous decision.

Gonzalez faced Miranda Maverick at Invicta FC 39 on February 7, 2020. She lost the fight via unanimous decision.

Gonzalez was then scheduled to face Erin Blanchfield for the vacant Invicta FC Flyweight Championship at Invicta FC 43 on November 20, 2020. However, Gonzalez was forced to withdraw due to contracting COVID-19 and the bout was supposed to be postponed to the future. However, her contract with the organization expired before she had the following bout.

=== Post-Invicta ===
Gonzalez made her MMA return after three and a half years at XFC 50 on April 12, 2024, against Monica Medina. She won by armbar submission in the first round.

== Bare-knuckle boxing ==
On April 22, 2021, it was announced that Gonzalez had signed a multi-fight contract with Bare Knuckle Fighting Championship. On June 1, 2021, it was announced that Gonzalez was expected to make her debut against Charisa Sigala at BKFC 18 on June 26, 2021. She won the debut via unanimous decision.

Her sophomore appearance came against Britain Hart at BKFC 22 on November 12, 2021. She lost the fight via unanimous decision and subsequently stated that she will be moving away from the sport. This fight, however, earned her the Fight of the Night award.

== Boxing career ==
After winning her first two professional boxing bouts, she lost to Gina Mazany at Gamebred Boxing 4 on April 1, 2023. After more than 2 years, she made her boxing return on the Misfits Mania – The Fight Before Christmas undercard, where she defeated Tai Emery via unanimous decision and won the vacant MFB women's middleweight title. Her first defense victory was on March 7, 2026, on the MF Duel 2: Mitchell vs. Rosado undercard, where she defeated MFB women's lightweight champion Carla Jade via unanimous decision.

== Championships and accomplishments ==
=== Mixed martial arts ===
- Xtreme Fighting Championships
  - Xtreme Fighting Championships Women's Strawweight Champion vs. Cortney Casey

=== Bare-knuckle boxing ===
- Bare Knuckle Fighting Championship
  - Fight of the Night (One time) vs. Britain Hart

=== Professional boxing ===
- Misfits Boxing
  - MFB Women's Middleweight Championship (one time, current)

== Mixed martial arts record ==
Professional record breakdown
17 matches	11 wins	6 losses
By knockout	1	0
By submission	6	1
By decision	4	5

Res.	Record	Opponent	Method	Event	Date	Round	Time	Location	Notes
Loss	11–6	Rainn Guerrero	Decision (unanimous)	XFC: Detroit Grand Prix 2	May 31, 2024	3	5:00	Detroit, Michigan, United States	
Win	11–5	Monica Medina	Submission (armbar)	XFC 50	April 12, 2024	1	1:51	Lakeland, Florida, United States	Bantamweight debut.
Loss	10–5	Miranda Maverick	Decision (unanimous)	Invicta FC 39: Frey vs. Cummins II	February 7, 2020	3	5:00	Kansas City, Kansas, United States	
Win	10–4	Brogan Walker-Sanchez	Decision (unanimous)	Invicta FC 37: Gonzalez vs. Sanchez	October 4, 2019	3	5:00	Kansas City, Kansas, United States	
Loss	9–4	Vanessa Porto	Technical Decision (unanimous)	Invicta FC 34: Porto vs. Gonzalez	February 15, 2019	4	2:34	Kansas City, Missouri, United States	For the vacant Invicta FC Flyweight Championship. An accidental eye poke rendered Porto unable to continue.
Win	9–3	Daiane Firmino	Decision (unanimous)	Invicta FC 31: Jandiroba vs. Morandin	September 1, 2018	3	5:00	Kansas City, Missouri, United States	
Win	8–3	Barbara Acioly	Submission (armbar)	Invicta FC 29: Kaufman vs. Lehner	May 4, 2018	1	1:30	Kansas City, Missouri, United States	
Win	7–3	Kali Robbins	Decision (unanimous)	Invicta FC 28: Mizuki vs. Jandiroba	March 24, 2018	3	5:00	Salt Lake City, Utah, United States	
Loss	6–3	Poliana Botelho	Decision (unanimous)	UFC 216	October 7, 2017	3	5:00	Las Vegas, Nevada, United States	
Loss	6–2	Cynthia Calvillo	Submission (rear-naked choke)	UFC 210	April 8, 2017	3	3:45	Buffalo, New York, United States	
Win	6–1	Katie Klimansky-Casimir	Submission (armbar)	Hoosier Fight Club 28	April 30, 2016	2	4:20	Hammond, Indiana, United States	
Win	5–1	Valeria Mejia	TKO (punches)	XFO 56	August 15, 2016	1	3:34	Island Lake, Illinois, United States	
Win	4–1	Katie Anita Runyan	Submission (armbar)	Xplode Fight Series: Heat	July 11, 2015	1	0:39	Valley Center, California, United States	
Win	3–1	Nikki Duncan	Decision (unanimous)	XFO 55	April 25, 2015	3	5:00	Chicago, Illinois, United States	
Win	2–1	Cortney Casey	Submission (armbar)	XFC 26	October 18, 2013	3	4:43	Nashville, Tennessee, United States	Won the XFC Women's Strawweight championship.
Win	1–1	Suzie Montero	Submission (armbar)	XFC 22	February 22, 2013	1	4:56	Charlotte, North Carolina, United States	
Loss	0–1	Munah Holland	Decision (majority)	Ring of Combat 39	February 10, 2010	3	5:00	Atlantic City, New Jersey, United States	

== Boxing record ==
=== Professional ===
3 fights	2 wins	1 loss
By knockout	1	0
By decision	1	1

No.	Result	Record	Opponent	Type	Round, time	Date	Location	Notes
3	Loss	2–1	Gina Mazany	MD	6	Apr 1, 2023	Fiserv Forum, Milwaukee, Wisconsin, U.S.	
2	Win	2–0	Ivana Coleman	TKO	1 (4), 1:15	Nov 18, 2022	Biloxi Civic Center, Biloxi, Mississippi, U.S.	
1	Win	1–0	Danielle Wynn	UD	4	Aug 19, 2022	Biloxi Civic Center, Biloxi, Mississippi, U.S.	

=== MF–Professional ===
2 fights	2 wins	0 losses
By decision	2	0

No.	Result	Record	Opponent	Type	Round, time	Date	Location	Notes
2	Win	2–0	Carla Jade	UD	5	Mar 7, 2026	Vaillant Live, Derby, England	Defended MFB women's middleweight title
1	Win	1–0	Tai Emery	UD	5	Dec 20, 2025	Dubai Duty Free Tennis Stadium, Dubai, U.A.E.	Won vacant MFB women's middleweight title

== Bare knuckle boxing record ==
Professional record breakdown
2 matches	1 win	1 loss
By decision	1	1

Res.	Record	Opponent	Method	Event	Date	Round	Time	Location	Notes
Loss	1–1	Britain Hart	Decision (unanimous)	BKFC 22	November 12, 2021	5	2:00	Miami, Florida, United States	Fight of the Night.
Win	1–0	Charisa Sigala	Decision (unanimous)	BKFC 18	June 26, 2021	5	2:00	Miami, Florida, United States	

== See also ==
- List of current Invicta FC fighters
- List of female mixed martial artists
