= Melissa Gatto =

Brazilian mixed martial artist

- Born: May 2, 1996 (age 30); Toledo, Paraná, Brazil
- Height: 5 ft 5 in (1.65 m)
- Weight: 125 lb (57 kg; 8.9 st)
- Division: Flyweight (2017–present); Bantamweight (2018)
- Reach: 69 in (175 cm)
- Team: Team Bronx Cascavel; Chute Boxe
- Rank: Purple belt in Brazilian jiu-jitsu under Marco Barbosa
- Years active: 2016–present

Mixed martial arts record
- Total: 15
- Wins: 9
- By knockout: 3
- By submission: 4
- By decision: 2
- Losses: 3
- By decision: 3
- Draws: 3

Other information
- University: Western Paraná State University
- Mixed martial arts record from Sherdog

Melissa Gatto (born May 2, 1996) is a Brazilian professional mixed martial artist who currently fights in the women's flyweight division of the Ultimate Fighting Championship.

== Background ==
Gatto was born and grew up in Toledo, Paraná, Brazil, with an older and a younger brother. Following her big brother, she started training Kung Fu at the age of eight. Gradually she picked up also other disciplines eventually drifting to mixed martial arts in order to challenge herself. She attended Western Paraná State University from where she graduated with bachelor's degree in languages.

== Mixed martial arts career ==
=== Early career ===
Gatto racked up a record of 6–0–2 in Brazilian regional circuit before signing a contract with the UFC. In her last bout before the UFC, she submitted fellow future UFC fighter Karol Rosa with a first round kimura at Nação Cyborg 3.

=== Ultimate Fighting Championship ===
Gatto was scheduled to make her UFC debut replacing injured Jessica Rose-Clark on short notice against Talita Bernardo at UFC 237 on May 11, 2019. However, Gatto was pulled from the fight in the days leading up to the event and replaced by Viviane Araújo.

She was then scheduled to face Julia Avila at UFC 239 on July 6, 2019. However, she ended up pulling out citing an injury and was replaced by Pannie Kianzad. Later, news surfaced that Gatto was in fact pulled from the card due to testing positive for furosemide, a diuretic. She was given a USADA suspension and was eligibly to return to competition on June 5, 2020.

She was scheduled to face Mariya Agapova at UFC on ESPN: Eye vs. Calvillo on June 13, 2020. However, Gatto pulled out due to visa issues and was replaced by Hannah Cifers.

She ultimately made her debut against Victoria Leonardo at UFC 265 on August 7, 2021. She won the fight via technical knockout after the doctor stopped the fight between rounds two and three due to an arm injury sustained by Leonardo.

In her sophomore appearance Gatto faced Sijara Eubanks on December 18, 2021 at UFC Fight Night: Lewis vs. Daukaus. At the weigh-ins, Eubanks weighed in at 127.5 pounds, 1.5 pounds over the flyweight non-title fight limit. The bout proceeded at a catchweight. She won the fight via body kick TKO in the third round. The win earned her a Performance of the Night bonus award.

Gatto then faced Tracy Cortez at UFC 274 on May 7, 2022. She lost the fight via unanimous decision.

Gatto was scheduled to face Gillian Robertson on September 17, 2022 at UFC Fight Night 210. However, Gatto was removed from the event for undisclosed reasons.

Gatto faced Ariane Lipski on July 1, 2023, at UFC on ESPN 48. She lost the fight via split decision.

Gatto was scheduled to face Viktoriia Dudakova on March 30, 2024, at UFC on ESPN 54. However, the bout was cancelled during the broadcast due to a Dudakova illness.

Gatto faced Tamires Vidal, replacing injured Hailey Cowan, on May 18, 2024, at UFC Fight Night 241. Gatto won the fight by technical knockout from a punch to the chest.

Gatto faced Dione Barbosa on April 4, 2026 in a bantamweight bout at UFC Fight Night 272. She lost the fight by majority decision after Barbosa was deducted a point in round two for an illegal kick.

Gatto faced Ernesta Kareckaitė on October 10, 2026 at UFC Fight Night 290. The bout was deemed a majority draw after a point was deducted from Kareckaitė due to a fence grab.

== Championships and accomplishments ==
- Ultimate Fighting Championship
  - Performance of the Night (One time) vs. Sijara Eubanks

== Mixed martial arts record ==
Professional record breakdown
15 matches	9 wins	3 losses
By knockout	3	0
By submission	4	0
By decision	2	3
Draws	3	

Res.	Record	Opponent	Method	Event	Date	Round	Time	Location	Notes
Draw	9–3–3	Ernesta Kareckaitė	Draw (majority)	UFC Fight Night: Allen vs. Duncan	10 October 2026	3	5:00	Las Vegas, Nevada, United States	Kareckaitė was deducted one point in round 1 due to grabbing the fence.
Loss	9–3–2	Dione Barbosa	Decision (majority)	UFC Fight Night: Moicano vs. Duncan	4 April 2026	3	5:00	Las Vegas, Nevada, United States	Barbosa was deducted one point in round 2 due to an illegal soccer kick.
Win	9–2–2	Tamires Vidal	TKO (punch to the body)	UFC Fight Night: Barboza vs. Murphy	18 May 2024	3	0:37	Las Vegas, Nevada, United States	Bantamweight bout.
Loss	8–2–2	Ariane Lipski	Decision (split)	UFC on ESPN: Strickland vs. Magomedov	1 July 2023	3	5:00	Las Vegas, Nevada, United States	
Loss	8–1–2	Tracy Cortez	Decision (unanimous)	UFC 274	7 May 2022	3	5:00	Phoenix, Arizona, United States	
Win	8–0–2	Sijara Eubanks	TKO (body kick and punches)	UFC Fight Night: Lewis vs. Daukaus	18 December 2021	3	0:45	Las Vegas, Nevada, United States	Catchweight (127.5 lb) bout; Eubanks missed weight. Performance of the Night.
Win	7–0–2	Victoria Leonardo	TKO (doctor stoppage)	UFC 265	7 August 2021	2	5:00	Houston, Texas, United States	
Win	6–0–2	Karol Rosa	Submission (kimura)	Nação Cyborg 3	29 September 2018	1	4:19	Curitiba, Brazil	Bantamweight bout.
Draw	5–0–2	Sidy Rocha	Draw (split)	Pantanal Fight Champions 2	7 July 2018	3	5:00	Corumbá, Brazil	For the PFC Flyweight Championship.
Win	5–0–1	Joice de Andrade	Submission (armbar)	Clev Fight 1	5 May 2018	1	2:34	Clevelândia, Brazil	
Win	4–0–1	Kethylen Rothenburg	Submission (armbar)	Nação Cyborg 1	7 April 2018	1	1:36	Colombo, Brazil	Bantamweight bout.
Draw	3–0–1	Edna Oliveira Ajala	Draw (majority)	Bonito Eco Fight Combat 2	23 September 2017	3	5:00	Bonito, Brazil	
Win	3–0	Rafaela Thomazini	Submission (rear-naked choke)	Spartacus Circuit 9	9 September 2017	1	1:09	Cascavel, Brazil	
Win	2–0	Taynara Silva	Decision (unanimous)	Pantanal Fight Champions 1	12 August 2017	3	5:00	Corumbá, Brazil	Flyweight debut.
Win	1–0	Alexandra Alves	Decision (unanimous)	Spartacus Circuit 8	10 December 2016	3	5:00	Cascavel, Brazil	Featherweight debut.

== See also ==
- List of current UFC fighters
- List of female mixed martial artists
