= Victoria Leonardo =

American mixed martial arts fighter

Victoria Leonardo Mason
- Born: February 16, 1990 (age 36); Pomona, New Jersey, United States
- Other names: Fury
- Height: 5 ft 5 in (1.65 m)
- Weight: 125 lb (57 kg; 8 st 13 lb)
- Division: Flyweight
- Reach: 64.0 in (163 cm)
- Fighting out of: Shreveport, Louisiana
- Team: Elite Combat Academy
- Years active: 2018–present

Mixed martial arts record
- Total: 17
- Wins: 10
- By knockout: 1
- By submission: 5
- By decision: 4
- Losses: 7
- By knockout: 5
- By submission: 1
- By decision: 1

Other information
- Mixed martial arts record from Sherdog

Victoria Leonardo Mason (born February 16, 1990) is an American mixed martial artist who competed in the Flyweight division of the Ultimate Fighting Championship.

== Background ==
Born in the Pomona section of Galloway Township, New Jersey, Leonardo moved with her family to Shreveport, Louisiana when she was four years old. Studying Italian in high school helped Leonardo discover her love for foreign languages, but she switched to Spanish for her field of study in college. She was one of the last students out of Louisiana State University in Shreveport to major in a foreign language before the program was discontinued. With her degree, she teaches Spanish at Calvary Baptist Academy.

== Mixed martial arts career ==
=== Early career & Invicta ===
After starting her career in 2018 winning both her fights for Legacy Fighting Alliance, Victoria made her Invicta Fighting Championships debut against Miranda Maverick on September 1, 2018 at Invicta FC 31: Jandiroba vs. Morandin. She lost via a submission.

She picked up three straight submission wins, against Monica Medina at Gulf Coast MMA 2, against Jamie Milanowski at Invicta FC 34: Porto vs. Gonzalez, and against Malin Hermansson at Bellator 218.

On August 9, 2019, Leonardo faced Stephanie Geltmacher at Invicta FC 36. She won the fight via unanimous decision.

On February 7, 2020, Leonardo faced Erin Blanchfield at Invicta FC 39. In the second round Leonardo got dropped with a head kick, getting stopped by stoppage.

Victoria faced Liz Tracy at Invicta FC 42: Cummins vs. Zappitella on September 17, 2020. She won the fight via unanimous decision.

Leonardo competed at Dana White's Contender Series 36 where she fought and won against Chelsea Hackett on November 17, 2020 for an UFC contract.

=== Ultimate Fighting Championship ===
Victoria was scheduled to face fellow newcomer Natália Silva on January 20, 2021 at UFC on ESPN 20. Silva pulled out due to a fractured ulna and was replaced by fellow newcomer Manon Fiorot. She lost the fight via TKO in round two.

Leonardo faced Melissa Gatto on August 7, 2021 at UFC 265. She lost the fight via technical knockout in round two after the doctor stopped the fight between rounds two and three due to an arm injury.

Leonardo faced Mandy Böhm on July 23, 2022, at UFC Fight Night 208. She won the fight via unanimous decision.

Leonardo faced Natália Silva on May 20, 2023, at UFC Fight Night 223. She lost the fight via technical knockout in round one.

Leonardo faced Cong Wang on August 24, 2024 at UFC on ESPN 62. She lost the fight by knockout in the first round.

On October 8, 2024, it was reported that Leonardo was removed from the UFC roster.

=== Post-UFC Career ===
Leonardo made her return to Invicta in the co-main event of Invicta FC 58 against Amanda Torres on November 6, 2024. She would win the fight via submission in the third round with an armbar.

In her next fight, Leonardo would face Rayla Nascimento at Invicta FC 60 on February 7, 2025. She would lose the fight via unanimous decision.

== Mixed martial arts record ==
Professional record breakdown
17 matches	10 wins	7 losses
By knockout	1	5
By submission	5	1
By decision	4	1

Res.	Record	Opponent	Method	Event	Date	Round	Time	Location	Notes
Loss	10–7	Rayla Nascimento	Decision (unanimous)	Invicta FC 60	February 7, 2025	3	5:00	Atlanta, Georgia, United States	
Win	10–6	Amanda Torres	Submission (armbar)	Invicta FC 58	November 6, 2024	3	1:36	Kansas City, Kansas, United States	
Loss	9–6	Wang Cong	KO (punches)	UFC on ESPN: Cannonier vs. Borralho	August 24, 2024	1	1:02	Las Vegas, Nevada, United States	
Loss	9–5	Natália Silva	TKO (punches and head kick)	UFC Fight Night: Dern vs. Hill	May 20, 2023	1	2:58	Las Vegas, Nevada, United States	
Win	9–4	Mandy Böhm	Decision (unanimous)	UFC Fight Night: Blaydes vs. Aspinall	July 23, 2022	3	5:00	London, England	
Loss	8–4	Melissa Gatto	TKO (doctor stoppage)	UFC 265	August 7, 2021	2	5:00	Houston, Texas, United States	
Loss	8–3	Manon Fiorot	TKO (head kick and punches)	UFC on ESPN: Chiesa vs. Magny	January 20, 2021	2	4:08	Abu Dhabi, United Arab Emirates	
Win	8–2	Chelsea Hackett	TKO (punches)	Dana White's Contender Series 36	November 17, 2020	2	4:41	Las Vegas, Nevada, United States	
Win	7–2	Liz Tracy	Decision (unanimous)	Invicta FC 42	September 17, 2020	4	1:20	Kansas City, Kansas, United States	Fight of the Night.
Loss	6–2	Erin Blanchfield	KO (head kick and punches)	Invicta FC 39	February 7, 2020	2	2:06	Kansas City, Kansas, United States	
Win	6–1	Stephanie Geltmacher	Decision (unanimous)	Invicta FC 36	August 9, 2019	3	5:00	Kansas City, Kansas, United States	Fight of the Night.
Win	5–1	Malin Hermansson	Submission (armbar)	Bellator 218	March 22, 2019	1	4:49	Thackerville, Oklahoma, United States	
Win	4–1	Jamie Milanowski	Submission (rear-naked choke)	Invicta FC 34	February 15, 2019	1	2:45	Kansas City, Missouri, United States	Performance of the Night.
Win	3–1	Monica Medina	Submission (rear-naked choke)	Gulf Coast MMA 2	October 20, 2018	2	2:14	Biloxi, Mississippi, United States	
Loss	2–1	Miranda Maverick	Submission (armbar)	Invicta FC 31	September 1, 2018	1	3:26	Kansas City, Missouri, United States	
Win	2–0	Salina Rowland	Decision (unanimous)	LFA 46	July 27, 2018	3	5:00	Newport News, Virginia, United States	Catchweight (126.6 lb) bout; Leonardo missed weight.
Win	1–0	Hailey Cowan	Submission (rear-naked choke)	LFA 40	May 25, 2018	1	4:27	Dallas, Texas, United States	Flyweight debut.

== See also ==
- List of female mixed martial artists
