= Michael E. Casey =

American politician and lawyer

Michael E. Casey (February 1, 1870 – June 14, 1949) was an American Democratic politician and lawyer who served in the Missouri General Assembly. He served in the Missouri Senate from 1909 until 1941 and in the Missouri House of Representatives from 1903 until 1907.

Born in Pennsylvania, he was educated in the public schools of Kansas City and graduated from Kansas City School of Law in 1899. In 1903, he married Miss Margaret Meredith. For many years in the 1920s and into the 1940s, Casey along with Michael Kinney and Joseph Brogan were three Democrats who dominated the Missouri Senate.

He died in Missouri at the age of eighty.
