= Poliana Botelho =

Brazilian mixed martial artist

- Born: December 15, 1988 (age 37); Muriae, Minas Gerais, Brazil
- Height: 5 ft 8 in (1.73 m)
- Weight: 115 lb (52 kg; 8.2 st)
- Division: Strawweight (2016-present); Flyweight (2013-2016)
- Reach: 67 in (170 cm)
- Style: Muay Thai, Brazilian Jiu Jitsu
- Fighting out of: Rio de Janeiro, Rio de Janeiro, Brazil
- Team: Nova União
- Rank: Black belt in Muay Thai; Brown belt in Brazilian Jiu-Jitsu under Michele Tavares
- Years active: 2013–present

Mixed martial arts record
- Total: 14
- Wins: 9
- By knockout: 6
- By decision: 3
- Losses: 5
- By submission: 2
- By decision: 3

Other information
- Mixed martial arts record from Sherdog

Poliana Botelho (born December 15, 1988) is a Brazilian mixed martial artist who competes in the strawweight division of Bellator MMA. She previously has competed in the Ultimate Fighting Championship (UFC) and held the Women's Flyweight Championship in the Xtreme Fighting Championships.

== Mixed martial arts career ==
=== Early career ===
Botelho made her professional debut in 2013, getting knockout wins over Thais Raphaela and Ingrid Schwartz in Favela Kombat and KTAF respectively. In 2014, she fought for the vacant flyweight title in the promotion Bitetti Combat. She lost the bout via Unanimous Decision to fellow Brazilian Mixed Martial Artist Viviane Pereira. She later signed to the Xtreme Fighting Championships as a Flyweight.

=== Xtreme Fighting Championships ===
In 2014, Botelho joined XFC's second women's flyweight tournament. She made her promotional debut in September 2014 at XFCi 6 against Karina Rodriguez, winning the fight by TKO. The win propelled her to the tournament's semifinal round.

Botelho was then slated to fight Taila Santos at XFCi 8 in December 2014. However, Santos failed to make weight, leading to the cancelation of the bout. Botelho, in turn, was advanced to the tournament's final round.

In March 2015, Botelho fought once more under the XFC banner, this time taking on Antonia Silvaneide in the Women's Flyweight Tournament Final at XFCi 9. She won the fight by TKO in the first round, becoming the second winner in the history of the tournament. After the win, she was honored with a parade in her hometown.

Later that year, Botelho faced Argentine fighter Silvana Gómez Juárez, this time for the vacant XFC Women's Flyweight belt at XFCi 11. Despite being dropped and nearly submitted in the early rounds, Botelho went on to win the fight after a doctor stoppage between rounds. Botelho became the promotion's Women's Flyweight Champion.

After her success in XFC, Botelho vacated the title and was signed to the Ultimate Fighting Championship in 2016.

=== Ultimate Fighting Championship ===
Botelho joined the UFC's strawweight division. She was expected to make her UFC debut against Valerie Letourneau at UFC 206, but was forced to pull out due to injury. She was replaced by former opponent and fellow XFC champion Viviane Pereira.

Botelho fought Pearl Gonzalez at UFC 216 on October 7, 2017. She won the fight via unanimous decision.

Botelho faced Syuri Kondo on May 19, 2018 at UFC Fight Night 129. She won the fight via TKO due to a body kick and punches just 33 seconds into the first round.

Botelho faced Cynthia Calvillo on November 17, 2018 at UFC Fight Night 140. At the weigh-ins, Calvillo weighed in at 118 lbs, 2 pounds over the strawweight non-title fight limit of 116 lbs. She was fined 20 percent of her purse, which went to Botelho, and the bout proceeded at catchweight. She lost the fight via a rear-naked choke submission in round one.

Botelho was briefly linked to a matchup with Paige VanZant at UFC 236 on April 13, However, just days after the pairing was leaked, VanZant announced that she would not be competing on the card due to a fractured right arm. VanZant was replaced by Lauren Mueller. She won the fight by unanimous decision.

Botelho was scheduled to face Maryna Moroz on August 17, 2019 at UFC 241. However, it was reported on August 1, 2019 that Moroz was forced to pull out from the event citing injury.

Botelho faced Gillian Robertson on October 18, 2020 at UFC Fight Night 180. She lost the fight via unanimous decision.

Botelho was scheduled to face Ji Yeon Kim on May 1, 2021 at UFC on ESPN: Reyes vs. Procházka. However, Kim pulled out of the fight on March 22 citing injury and was replaced by Mayra Bueno Silva. Bueno suffered a back injury in late March and she was pulled from the bout. Bueno was replaced by Luana Carolina. She lost the close bout via split decision.

Botelho was scheduled to face Ji Yeon Kim on January 22, 2022 at UFC 270, but Botelho pulled out instead and the pairing was scrapped.

Botelho faced Karine Silva on June 4, 2022 at UFC Fight Night 207. She lost the fight via brabo choke in round one.

After her last loss, it was announced that Botelho was no longer under contract with the UFC.

=== Invicta FC ===
Botelho faced Helen Peralta at Invicta FC 49: Delboni vs. DeCoursey on September 28, 2022. She won the bout via unanimous decision.

=== Bellator MMA ===
Soon after her victory in Invicta, Botelho was signed to a multi-fight contract with Bellator MMA.

== Championships and accomplishments ==
=== Mixed martial arts ===
- Xtreme Fighting Championships
  - Xtreme Fighting Championships Women's Flyweight Champion (One time) vs. Silvana Gómez Juárez

== Personal life ==
In February 2023, Botelho announced on her social media that she was getting treatment for breast cancer and had a lymph node removed. In August 2024, Botelho announced she beat the disease.

== Mixed martial arts record ==
Professional record breakdown
14 matches	9 wins	5 losses
By knockout	6	0
By submission	0	2
By decision	3	3

Res.	Record	Opponent	Method	Event	Date	Round	Time	Location	Notes
Win	9–5	Helen Peralta	Decision (unanimous)	Invicta FC 49	September 28, 2022	3	5:00	Hinton, Oklahoma, United States	
Loss	8–5	Karine Silva	Submission (brabo choke)	UFC Fight Night: Volkov vs. Rozenstruik	June 4, 2022	1	4:55	Las Vegas, Nevada, United States	
Loss	8–4	Luana Carolina	Decision (split)	UFC on ESPN: Reyes vs. Procházka	May 1, 2021	3	5:00	Las Vegas, Nevada, United States	Catchweight (128.5 lb) bout; Carolina missed weight.
Loss	8–3	Gillian Robertson	Decision (unanimous)	UFC Fight Night: Ortega vs. The Korean Zombie	October 18, 2020	3	5:00	Abu Dhabi, United Arab Emirates	
Win	8–2	Lauren Mueller	Decision (unanimous)	UFC 236	April 13, 2019	3	5:00	Atlanta, Georgia, United States	Return to Flyweight.
Loss	7–2	Cynthia Calvillo	Submission (rear-naked choke)	UFC Fight Night: Magny vs. Ponzinibbio	November 17, 2018	1	4:48	Buenos Aires, Argentina	Catchweight (118 lb) bout; Calvillo missed weight.
Win	7–1	Syuri Kondo	TKO (body kick and punches)	UFC Fight Night: Maia vs. Usman	May 19, 2018	1	0:33	Santiago, Chile	
Win	6–1	Pearl Gonzalez	Decision (unanimous)	UFC 216	October 7, 2017	3	5:00	Las Vegas, Nevada, United States	Strawweight debut.
Win	5–1	Silvana Gómez Juárez	TKO (doctor stoppage)	XFC International 11	September 19, 2015	4	5:00	São Paulo, Brazil	Won the vacant XFC Flyweight Championship.
Win	4–1	Antonia Silvaneide	TKO (punches)	XFC International 9	March 14, 2015	1	1:36	São Paulo, Brazil	
Win	3–1	Karina Rodríguez	TKO (body kick)	XFC International 6	September 27, 2014	3	2:15	Araraquara, Brazil	
Loss	2–1	Viviane Pereira	Decision (unanimous)	Bitetti Combat 20	June 7, 2014	3	5:00	Armação dos Búzios, Brazil	For the vacant Bitetti Combat Women's Flyweight Championship.
Win	2–0	Ingrid Schwartz	TKO (punches)	KTA Fight 1	December 14, 2013	1	N/A	Cataguases, Brazil	
Win	1–0	Thais Raphaela	TKO (punches)	Favela Kombat 8	September 28, 2013	1	N/A	Niterói, Brazil	

== See also ==
- List of current Bellator MMA fighters
- List of female mixed martial artists
