= Veronica Hardy =

Venezuelan mixed martial arts fighter

- Born: Veronica Macedo; 30 October 1995 (age 30); Caracas, Venezuela
- Height: 5 ft 3 in (1.60 m)
- Weight: 125 lb (57 kg; 8.9 st)
- Division: Flyweight
- Reach: 64 in (163 cm)
- Fighting out of: New York City, New York, U.S.
- Team: Hardy-Wallhead MMA
- Years active: 2016–Present

Mixed martial arts record
- Total: 16
- Wins: 10
- By knockout: 1
- By submission: 2
- By decision: 7
- Losses: 5
- By knockout: 1
- By submission: 1
- By decision: 3
- Draws: 1

Amateur record
- Total: 2
- Wins: 2
- By knockout: 2
- Losses: 0

Other information
- Mixed martial arts record from Sherdog

Veronica Hardy (née Macedo; born October 30, 1995) is a Venezuelan mixed martial artist who currently competes in the women's Flyweight division in the Ultimate Fighting Championship (UFC).

== Early life ==
Growing up in a family with a passion for martial arts, Veronica's early life was immersed in a culture that fostered her love for the sport. Veronica began training in Taekwondo at the age of four and quickly demonstrated aptitude for the discipline, earning her black belt by the age of twelve. She also pursued training in other disciplines such as Brazilian Jiu-Jitsu, Karate, and Kickboxing. As Venezuela faced political and economic turmoil, her family decided to move to Poland in search of better living conditions. There, Veronica continued her training on various martial arts. The move ultimately led to her pursuing a career in mixed martial arts (MMA).

Over the next few years, she continued to train in various disciplines, such as Brazilian Jiu-Jitsu, Taekwondo, and Muay Thai.

== Mixed martial arts career ==
=== Early career ===
Before joining the UFC, Veronica Hardy had a professional MMA record of 5-0-1. She competed in various regional promotions in Europe. Her performance on the regional circuit caught the attention of the UFC, which led to her signing with the promotion in 2016.

=== Ultimate Fighting Championship ===
Hardy faced Ashlee Evans-Smith on September 3, 2016 at UFC Fight Night 93. She lost the fight via technical knockout in round three.

Hardy faced Andrea Lee on May 19, 2018 at UFC Fight Night 129. She lost the fight by unanimous decision. This fight earned her the Fight of the Night bonus.

Hardy faced Gillian Robertson on February 23, 2019 at UFC Fight Night 145. She lost the fight via submission in the second round.

Hardy was scheduled to face Rachael Ostovich on August 10, 2019 at UFC Fight Night 156. However, it was announced on July 29, 2019 that Ostovich was replaced by Polyana Viana for undisclosed reason. Hardy won the fight via a submission in round one. This win earned her the Performance of the Night award.

Hardy was scheduled to face Amanda Lemos on December 21, 2019 at UFC Fight Night 165. However, her bout with Amanda Lemos was cancelled and she was scheduled to face Ariane Lipski on November 16, 2019 at UFC on ESPN+ 22, replacing Priscila Cachoeira who was tested positive for a diuretic. In turn Hardy was not cleared to fight by the Brazilian athletic commission due to severe headaches one day before the fight was taken place and she was replaced by newcomer Isabella de Padua.

Hardy faced Bea Malecki on March 14, 2020 at UFC Fight Night 170. She lost the fight via unanimous decision.

After the bout, Hardy retired from MMA due to concussion issues.

After over three years since her last bout, Hardy returned on March 18, 2023 at UFC 286 against Juliana Miller. She won the fight by unanimous decision.

Hardy faced Jamey-Lyn Horth on December 2, 2023, at UFC on ESPN 52. She won the fight via split decision.

Hardy faced JJ Aldrich at UFC on ESPN 56 on May 11, 2024. She won the fight by unanimous decision.

Hardy faced Eduarda Moura on November 16, 2024 at UFC 309. She lost the fight by unanimous decision.

Hardy faced Brogan Walker on October 4, 2025 at UFC 320. She won the fight by unanimous decision.

Hardy was scheduled to face Dione Barbosa on July 18, 2026 at UFC Fight Night 281. However, Hardy pulled out in early July after suffering a cut during training and was replaced by promotional newcomer Anna Melisano.

== Personal life ==
Hardy married former UFC fighter Dan Hardy on December 25, 2022.

== Championships and awards ==
=== Mixed martial arts ===
- Ultimate Fighting Championship
  - Fight of the Night (One time) vs. Andrea Lee
  - Performance of the Night (One time) vs. Polyana Viana

== Mixed martial arts record ==
Professional record breakdown
16 matches	10 wins	5 losses
By knockout	1	1
By submission	2	1
By decision	7	3
Draws	1	

Res.	Record	Opponent	Method	Event	Date	Round	Time	Location	Notes
Win	10–5–1	Brogan Walker	Decision (unanimous)	UFC 320	October 4, 2025	3	5:00	Las Vegas, Nevada, United States	
Loss	9–5–1	Eduarda Moura	Decision (unanimous)	UFC 309	November 16, 2024	3	5:00	New York City, New York, United States	
Win	9–4–1	JJ Aldrich	Decision (unanimous)	UFC on ESPN: Lewis vs. Nascimento	May 11, 2024	3	5:00	St. Louis, Missouri, United States	
Win	8–4–1	Jamey-Lyn Horth	Decision (split)	UFC on ESPN: Dariush vs. Tsarukyan	December 2, 2023	3	5:00	Austin, Texas, United States	
Win	7–4–1	Juliana Miller	Decision (unanimous)	UFC 286	March 18, 2023	3	5:00	London, England	
Loss	6–4–1	Bea Malecki	Decision (unanimous)	UFC Fight Night: Lee vs. Oliveira	March 14, 2020	3	5:00	Brasília, Brazil	Bantamweight bout.
Win	6–3–1	Polyana Viana	Submission (armbar)	UFC Fight Night: Shevchenko vs. Carmouche 2	August 10, 2019	1	1:09	Montevideo, Uruguay	Performance of the Night.
Loss	5–3–1	Gillian Robertson	Submission (rear-naked choke)	UFC Fight Night: Błachowicz vs. Santos	February 23, 2019	2	3:27	Prague, Czech Republic	
Loss	5–2–1	Andrea Lee	Decision (unanimous)	UFC Fight Night: Maia vs. Usman	May 19, 2018	3	5:00	Santiago, Chile	Flyweight debut. Fight of the Night.
Loss	5–1–1	Ashlee Evans-Smith	TKO (elbows)	UFC Fight Night: Arlovski vs. Barnett	September 3, 2016	3	2:46	Hamburg, Germany	
Draw	5–0–1	Irén Rácz	Draw (majority)	Innferno FC 2	August 18, 2016	3	5:00	Kufstein, Austria	
Win	5–0	Karine Gevorgyan	Submission (heel hook)	Mix Fight Events 23	July 8, 2016	3	1:23	La Nucia, Spain	Catchweight (139 lb) bout.
Win	4–0	Valérie Domergue	Decision (unanimous)	HIT-FC 2	May 28, 2016	3	5:00	Zürich, Switzerland	
Win	3–0	Lilla Vincze	TKO (punches)	Ladies Fight Night 2	April 1, 2016	1	2:15	Łódź, Poland	Bantamweight debut.
Win	2–0	Camilla Hinze	Decision (split)	Trophy MMA 8	March 26, 2016	3	5:00	Malmö, Sweden	Catchweight (132 lb) bout.
Win	1–0	Anne Merkt	Decision (unanimous)	We Love MMA 20	March 12, 2016	3	5:00	Munich, Germany	Catchweight (139 lb) bout.

Amateur record breakdown		
2 matches	2 wins	0 losses
By knockout	2	0

Res.	Record	Opponent	Method	Event	Date	Round	Time	Location	Notes
Win	2–0	Chrissy Audin	KO (head kick)	Say Uncle Fight Night 2	October 11, 2014	1	0:24	Sheffield, England	
Win	1–0	Angela Danzig	TKO (head kick and punches)	MMA Battle Arena: Team USA vs. Team UK	September 27, 2014	2	1:15	Leicester, England	

== See also ==
- List of current UFC fighters
