= Miranda Maverick =

American mixed martial artist (born 1997)

- Born: Miranda Rachelle Maverick; July 1, 1997 (age 29); Tunas, Missouri, U.S.
- Height: 5 ft 3 in (1.60 m)
- Weight: 125 lb (57 kg; 8 st 13 lb)
- Division: Flyweight
- Reach: 65 in (165 cm)
- Fighting out of: Norfolk, Virginia, U.S.
- Team: The House of Muay Thai (2018–2021); Semerzier BJJ; Team Elevation (2021–present)
- Trainer: Jake Chamberlain, Mackens Semerzier
- Rank: Black belt in Brazilian Jiu-Jitsu
- Years active: 2016–present

Mixed martial arts record
- Total: 21
- Wins: 15
- By knockout: 1
- By submission: 7
- By decision: 7
- Losses: 6
- By decision: 6

Other information
- University: Old Dominion University; Drury University
- Mixed martial arts record from Sherdog

Miranda Rachelle Maverick (born July 1, 1997) is an American mixed martial artist who competes in the women's Flyweight division of the Ultimate Fighting Championship (UFC). She competed in Flyweight division of the Invicta Fighting Championships. As of November 7, 2026, she is #13 in the Meta UFC women's flyweight rankings.

== Background ==
Maverick was born in Tunas, Missouri. She grew up working on her family farm moving around many states in the Midwest and Southern United States, earning her the strength that she is known for within the martial arts community. She started grappling when she was sixteen after encouragement by her father while watching Ronda Rousey fight on the television. She also joined her high school wrestling team at Buffalo High School in Buffalo, Missouri her senior year and competed on the men's varsity team until discovering that she would not be going to college for wrestling. She then stopped to focus on wrestling, instead turning her sights on MMA soon after she graduated high school.

Despite concentrating in mixed martial arts, Maverick graduated with honors from Drury University, majoring in psychology and sociology in 2018. Maverick then relocated to Norfolk, VA to pursue a PhD in Industrial/Organizational Psychology at Old Dominion University.

== Mixed martial arts career ==
=== Early career ===
Maverick started her amateur career in 2015, fighting under Kansas City Fighting Alliance, ShoFight, and The Blue Corner promotions. She amassed a record of 7–1, winning the Blue Corner and Shofight flyweight championships all while 18 years old, being listed as the number one amateur woman in her region on Tapology at the time she went pro. After her final amateur win, she was soon contacted by President Shannon Knapp of Invicta Fighting Championships.

=== Invicta Fighting Championships ===
Maverick made her promotional debut on November 18, 2016, at Invicta FC 20: Evinger vs. Kunitskaya against Samantha Diaz. Samantha Diaz cut off her hair the day of weight-ins to make weight and Maverick came in over 2 pounds above the strawweight limit. Maverick won the fight via rear naked choke in round one.

Her next pro fight was on March 25, 2017, at Invicta FC 22: Evinger vs. Kunitskaya II facing Kalyn Schwartz. On the weight-in Maverick missed weight by 4.5 Ibs over the upper limit of 116 Ibs. She won the fight via submission on round one.

On July 15, 2017, Maverick faced Gabby Romero at Invicta FC 24: Dudieva vs. Borella. She won the fight via unanimous decision.

Her next fight came on July 21, 2018, facing Brogan Walker-Sanchez at Invicta FC 30. She lost the fight via unanimous decision.

Maverick faced Victoria Leonardo on September 1, 2018, at Invicta FC 31: Jandiroba vs. Morandin. She defeated Leonardo via a submission.

At Invicta 34 in February 2019, Maverick lost a unanimous decision to DeAnna Bennett.

In September, Maverick entered the Invicta Phoenix Series flyweight tournament with a chance to reestablish herself in the flyweight division. In the first round of the tournament, consisting of one 5-minute round, she defeated Victoria Leonardo via striking and clinch in a rematch via unanimous decision. Her second round match (also one 5-minute round) ended with Maverick submitting Shanna Young via rear naked choke. Maverick won the tournament by defeating DeAnna Bennett in a rematch by third round neck crank submission in the finals.

Maverick defeated Pearl Gonzalez at Invicta FC 39 on February 7, 2020.

=== Ultimate Fighting Championship ===
Maverick was expected to make her promotional debut against Mara Romero Borella on June 27, 2020, at UFC on ESPN: Poirier vs. Hooker. However, Maverick was forced to pull out due to injury.

Maverick faced Liana Jojua on October 24, 2020, at UFC 254. She won the fight via TKO due to a doctor stoppage between rounds one and two.

Maverick was expected to face Gillian Robertson at UFC 258 on February 13, 2021. However, hours before the fight, Robertson had a non-COVID related illness and the bout was cancelled. The pair was eventually rescheduled to UFC 260 on March 27, 2021. Maverick won the fight via unanimous decision.

Maverick faced Maycee Barber on July 24, 2021, at UFC on ESPN: Sandhagen vs. Dillashaw. She lost the fight via controversial split decision. 22 out of 22 media outlets scored the bout as a win for Maverick.

Maverick stepped in for an injured Maycee Barber to face Erin Blanchfield on December 11, 2021, at UFC 269. She lost the fight by unanimous decision.

Replacing Mandy Böhm, Maverick faced Sabina Mazo on March 12, 2022, at UFC Fight Night 203. Maverick won the fight via rear-naked choke in round two.

Maverick was scheduled to face Shanna Young on August 20, 2022, at UFC 278. However, the bout was cancelled when Young was hospitalized due to weight cutting issues. The pair was rescheduled at UFC Fight Night 214. She won the fight via unanimous decision.

Maverick faced Jasmine Jasudavicius on June 10, 2023, at UFC 289. In an upset, she lost the bout via unanimous decision.

Maverick faced Priscila Cachoeira at UFC 291 on July 29, 2023, winning the bout via an armbar submission in the third round.

Maverick faced Andrea Lee on February 17, 2024, at UFC 298. She won the bout by unanimous decision.

Maverick was scheduled to face Tracy Cortez on July 20, 2024, at UFC on ESPN 60. However, Cortez was pulled from the event to serve as a replacement fighter at the UFC on ESPN 59 event and was replaced by Dione Barbosa. She won the fight by unanimous decision.

Maverick was re-scheduled to face Tracy Cortez on December 14, 2024 at UFC on ESPN 63. However, Cortez was forced to withdraw due to health issues that required her to have surgery and was replaced by former LFA Women's Flyweight Champion Jamey-Lyn Horth. Maverick won the fight by unanimous decision.

Maverick faced former two-time UFC Women's Strawweight Champion Rose Namajunas on June 14, 2025 at UFC on ESPN 69. She lost the fight by unanimous decision.

== Grappling career ==
Maverick won a silver medal in the brown belt lightweight division of the IBJJF No-Gi World Championship 2023.

== Freestyle wrestling ==
Maverick is scheduled to make her Real American Freestyle debut against Haley Augello on November 28, 2026 at RAF 15.

== Championships and accomplishments ==
=== Mixed martial arts ===
- Ultimate Fighting Championship
  - Tied (Maycee Barber & Gillian Robertson) for third most wins in UFC Women's Flyweight division history (8)
  - Third most takedowns landed in UFC Women's Flyweight division history (23)
  - Third most top position time in UFC Women's Flyweight division history (38:31)

== Mixed martial arts record ==
Professional record breakdown
21 matches	15 wins	6 losses
By knockout	1	0
By submission	7	0
By decision	7	6

Res.	Record	Opponent	Method	Event	Date	Round	Time	Location	Notes
Loss	15–6	Rose Namajunas	Decision (unanimous)	UFC on ESPN: Usman vs. Buckley	June 14, 2025	3	5:00	Atlanta, Georgia, United States	
Win	15–5	Jamey-Lyn Horth	Decision (unanimous)	UFC on ESPN: Covington vs. Buckley	December 14, 2024	3	5:00	Tampa, Florida, United States	
Win	14–5	Dione Barbosa	Decision (unanimous)	UFC on ESPN: Lemos vs. Jandiroba	July 20, 2024	3	5:00	Las Vegas, Nevada, United States	
Win	13–5	Andrea Lee	Decision (unanimous)	UFC 298	February 17, 2024	3	5:00	Anaheim, California, United States	
Win	12–5	Priscila Cachoeira	Submission (armbar)	UFC 291	July 29, 2023	3	2:11	Salt Lake City, Utah, United States	
Loss	11–5	Jasmine Jasudavicius	Decision (unanimous)	UFC 289	June 10, 2023	3	5:00	Vancouver, British Columbia, Canada	
Win	11–4	Shanna Young	Decision (unanimous)	UFC Fight Night: Rodriguez vs. Lemos	November 5, 2022	3	5:00	Las Vegas, Nevada, United States	
Win	10–4	Sabina Mazo	Submission (rear-naked choke)	UFC Fight Night: Santos vs. Ankalaev	March 12, 2022	2	2:15	Las Vegas, Nevada, United States	
Loss	9–4	Erin Blanchfield	Decision (unanimous)	UFC 269	December 11, 2021	3	5:00	Las Vegas, Nevada, United States	
Loss	9–3	Maycee Barber	Decision (split)	UFC on ESPN: Sandhagen vs. Dillashaw	July 24, 2021	3	5:00	Las Vegas, Nevada, United States	
Win	9–2	Gillian Robertson	Decision (unanimous)	UFC 260	March 27, 2021	3	5:00	Las Vegas, Nevada, United States	
Win	8–2	Liana Jojua	TKO (doctor stoppage)	UFC 254	October 24, 2020	1	5:00	Abu Dhabi, United Arab Emirates	
Win	7–2	Pearl Gonzalez	Decision (unanimous)	Invicta FC 39	February 7, 2020	3	5:00	Kansas City, Kansas, United States	Performance of the Night.
Win	6–2	DeAnna Bennett	Submission (rear-naked choke)	Invicta FC: Phoenix Series 2	September 6, 2019	3	3:38	Kansas City, Kansas, United States	Won the Invicta FC Phoenix Series 2 Flyweight Tournament.
Win	5–2	Heather Walker-Leahy	Submission (guillotine choke)	Shogun Fights 22	July 13, 2019	1	1:38	Oxon Hill, Maryland, United States	
Loss	4–2	DeAnna Bennett	Decision (unanimous)	Invicta FC 34	February 15, 2019	3	5:00	Kansas City, Missouri, United States	
Win	4–1	Victoria Leonardo	Submission (armbar)	Invicta FC 31	September 1, 2018	1	3:26	Kansas City, Missouri, United States	Performance of the Night.
Loss	3–1	Brogan Walker-Sanchez	Decision (unanimous)	Invicta FC 30	July 21, 2018	3	5:00	Kansas City, Missouri, United States	
Win	3–0	Gabby Romero	Decision (unanimous)	Invicta FC 24	July 15, 2017	3	5:00	Kansas City, Missouri, United States	Flyweight debut.
Win	2–0	Kalyn Schwartz	Submission (armbar)	Invicta FC 22	March 25, 2017	1	3:01	Kansas City, Missouri, United States	
Win	1–0	Samantha Diaz	Submission (rear-naked choke)	Invicta FC 20	November 18, 2016	1	4:26	Kansas City, Missouri, United States	Strawweight debut.

Exhibition record breakdown		
2 matches	2 wins	0 losses
By submission	1	0
By decision	1	0

Res.	Record	Opponent	Method	Event	Date	Round	Time	Location	Notes
Win	2–0	Shanna Young	Submission (rear-naked choke)	Invicta FC: Phoenix Series 2	September 6, 2019	1	2:35	Kansas City, Kansas, United States	Flyweight tournament semifinal exhibition bout.
Win	1–0	Victoria Leonardo	Decision (unanimous)	Invicta FC: Phoenix Series 2	September 6, 2019	1	5:00	Kansas City, Kansas, United States	Flyweight tournament quarterfinal exhibition bout.

== See also ==
- List of female mixed martial artists
- List of current UFC fighters
