= Helen Peralta =

Dominican mixed martial arts (MMA) fighter (born 1988)

- Born: July 10, 1988 (age 38); Santo Domingo, Dominican Republic
- Other names: Iansã
- Height: 5 ft 1 in (1.55 m)
- Division: Flyweight (115—125 Ib)
- Reach: 65 in (165 cm)
- Fighting out of: Fairfield, Iowa, United States
- Team: Martinez BJJ
- Years active: 2018–present

Mixed martial arts record
- Total: 11
- Wins: 6
- By knockout: 1
- By decision: 5
- Losses: 5
- By knockout: 2
- By decision: 3

Other information
- Mixed martial arts record from Sherdog

Helen Peralta (born July 10, 1988) is a Dominican mixed martial artist currently competing in the flyweight division of Invicta Fighting Championships, and a bare knuckle boxer for BYB Extreme Fighting Series competing in their featherweight division.

== Background ==
Peralta started mixed martial arts training after understanding she would be fighting people without legal consequences instead of getting herself into trouble.

== Mixed martial arts career ==
=== Invicta Fighting Championships ===
Peralta made her Invicta debut on January 13, 2018, against Jade Ripley at Invicta FC 27: Kaufman vs. Kianzad. She won the fight via technical knockout in round one.

Her second fight in Invicta was set on May 4, 2018, at Invicta FC 29: Kaufman vs. Lehner against Cheyanne Vlismas. She won the fight via unanimous decision.

Peralta fight under Cage Fury Fighting Championships on September 1, 2018, facing Kay Hansen at Invicta FC 31: Jandiroba vs. Morandin. She lost the fight via technical knockout in round three.

After two fights in Invicta, Peralta fought Olympic boxer, Jennifer Chieng, at Invicta FC 42: Cummins vs. Zappitella on September 17, 2022. She won the fight via unanimous decision.

=== Cage Fury Fighting Championships ===
On May 28, 2021, Peralta faced Laura Gallardo at Cage Fury Fighting Championships 96. She lost the fight via split decision.

=== Return to Invicta Fighting Championships ===
Caitlin Sammons was the opponent she faced of her return to Invicta FC on August 27, 2021, at Invicta FC 44: A New Era. She won the fight via unanimous decision.

Peralta faced Elise Pone on January 12, 2022, at Invicta FC 45: Zappitella vs. Delboni II. She won the fight via unanimous decision.

Peralta was one of the contenders of The Ultimate Fighter 30 on 2022 installment of the Ultimate Fighting Championship (UFC)-produced reality television series The Ultimate Fighter on ESPN+ for the women's flyweights weight class.

I would love to be the next ultimate fighter. I would love to be the UFC champion but most importantly, I just wanted the mic because I have something to say, but nobody cares right now. I want to be a motivational speaker and I want to teach people how to find the badass in themselves but unless I can prove that it's possible, it's just hot air like everyone else.

Peralta faced Poliana Botelho at Invicta FC 49: Delboni vs. DeCoursey on September 28, 2022. She lost the bout via unanimous decision.

=== Legacy Fighting Alliance ===
Peralta faced Aline Pereira at Legacy Fighting Alliance 147: Melo vs. Costa on November 18, 2022. Peralta won the fight via unanimous decision.

=== Professional Fighters League ===
Peralta faced Lisa Mauldin on February 24, 2024, at PFL Challenger Series 13, losing the bout via ground and pound TKO in the third round.

== Mixed martial arts record ==
Professional record breakdown
11 matches	6 wins	5 losses
By knockout	1	2
By decision	5	3

Res.	Record	Opponent	Method	Event	Date	Round	Time	Location	Notes
Loss	6–5	Flore Hani	Decision (unanimous)	Octo Fighting League 2	December 22, 2023	3	5:00	Tahiti, French Polynesia	
Loss	6–4	Lisa Mauldin	TKO (punches)	PFL Challenger Series 13	February 24, 2023	3	3:51	Orlando, Florida, United States	
Win	6–3	Aline Pereira	Decision (unanimous)	LFA 147	November 18, 2022	3	5:00	Sloan, Iowa, United States	
Loss	5–3	Poliana Botelho	Decision (unanimous)	Invicta FC 49	September 28, 2022	3	5:00	Hinton, Oklahoma, United States	
Win	5–2	Elise Pone	Decision (unanimous)	Invicta FC 45	January 12, 2022	3	5:00	Kansas City, Missouri, United States	
Win	4–2	Caitlin Sammons	Decision (unanimous)	Invicta FC 44	August 27, 2021	3	5:00	Kansas City, Missouri, United States	Flyweight debut.
Loss	3–2	Laura Gallardo	Decision (split)	Cage Fury FC 96	May 28, 2021	3	5:00	Philadelphia, Pennsylvania, United States	
Win	3–1	Jennifer Chieng	Decision (unanimous)	Invicta FC 42	September 17, 2020	3	5:00	Kansas City, Missouri, United States	Catchweight (120 lb) bout.
Loss	2–1	Kay Hansen	TKO (punches)	Invicta FC 31	September 1, 2018	3	4:16	Kansas City, Missouri, United States	
Win	2–0	Cheyanne Vlismas	Decision (unanimous)	Invicta FC 29	May 4, 2018	3	5:00	Kansas City, Missouri, United States	
Win	1–0	Jade Ripley	TKO (punches)	Invicta FC 27	January 13, 2018	1	2:22	Kansas City, Missouri, United States	Strawweight debut.

Exhibition record breakdown		
1 match	0 wins	1 loss
By decision	0	1

Res.	Record	Opponent	Method	Event	Date	Round	Time	Location	Notes
Loss	0–1	Kaytlin Neil	Decision (split)	The Ultimate Fighter: Team Peña vs. Team Nunes	May 10, 2022 (air date)	3	5:00	Las Vegas, Nevada, United States	TUF 30 Quarter-final.

== Bare knuckle boxing career ==
Peralta was the former Police Gazette Women's Featherweight American Champion. It was reported in November 2023 that she signed a multi-fight deal to fight with BYB.

=== Bare Knuckle Fighting Championship ===
Helen Peralta made her bare-knuckle fighting debut against Christine Ferea for the Police Gazette Women's Featherweight American Championship at BKFC 7 on August 10, 2019. She defeated Ferea by unanimous decision to become the Police Gazette Women's Featherweight American Champion.

Peralta next faced Maia Kahunaele in a non-title match at BKFC 9 on November 16, 2019. Peralta won the fight by first-round knockout.

=== BYB Extreme ===
After a four-year absence, Helen Peralta made her return to bare-knuckle fighting by signing with BYB Extreme Fighting Series. In her return, she faced Lailane Mota at BYB 24: Saturday Super Brawl on February 10, 2024. The bout ended in a no contest after an accidental clash of heads rendered both fighters unable to continue.

== Bare-knuckle boxing record ==
Professional record breakdown
5 matches	3 wins	1 loss
By knockout	2	0
By decision	1	1
No contests	1	

Res.	Record	Opponent	Method	Event	Date	Round	Time	Location	Notes
Loss	3–1 (1)	Jamie Driver	Decision (unanimous)	BKB 42: Music City Brawl	June 21, 2025	5	2:00	Nashville, Tennessee, United States	BKB Women's Super Lightweight title eliminator.
Win	3–0 (1)	Monica Medina	TKO (punch)	BYB 28: Bourbon Street Brawl	July 13, 2024	1	1:16	New Orleans, Louisiana, United States	Won the inaugural BYB Women's Featherweight Championship. Knockout of the Night.
NC	2–0 (1)	Lailane Mota	NC (accidental headbutt)	BYB 24: Saturday Super Brawl	February 10, 2024	2	1:14	Biloxi, Mississippi, United States	Accidental clash of heads rendered Peralta unable to continue.
Win	2–0	Maia Kahunaele	KO (punches)	BKFC 9	November 16, 2019	1	1:57	Biloxi, Mississippi, United States	Non-title bout.
Win	1–0	Christine Ferea	Decision (unanimous)	BKFC 7	August 10, 2019	5	2:00	Biloxi, Mississippi, United States	Won the Police Gazette Women's Featherweight American Championship.

== See also ==
- List of current Invicta FC fighters
