= Kay Hansen =

American mixed martial artist

- Born: August 14, 1999 (age 27); California, U.S.
- Height: 5 ft 3 in (1.60 m)
- Weight: 125 lb (57 kg; 8.9 st)
- Division: Strawweight; Flyweight
- Reach: 63 in (160 cm)
- Fighting out of: Fullerton, California, U.S.
- Team: 10th Planet Fullerton; Classic Fight Team (2020–present)
- Rank: Purple belt in Brazilian Jiu-Jitsu
- Years active: 2015–present

Professional boxing record
- Total: 5
- Wins: 1
- Losses: 4

Mixed martial arts record
- Total: 14
- Wins: 8
- By knockout: 2
- By submission: 4
- By decision: 2
- Losses: 6
- By knockout: 1
- By decision: 5

Amateur record
- Total: 1
- Wins: 1
- By knockout: 1

Other information
- Boxing record from BoxRec
- Mixed martial arts record from Sherdog

Kay Hansen (born August 14, 1999) is an American mixed martial artist (MMA) who competed in the strawweight division of Invicta Fighting Championships. She also formerly fought in the Ultimate Fighting Championship (UFC).

== Background ==
Hansen grew up with a single mom and three younger sisters until the age of seven when her parents reunited. At the age of 16, her parents separated and Kay stayed with her father despite the "manipulating and toxic environment" he upheld since her childhood.

Hansen originally played softball, but after seeing Ronda Rousey defeat Bethe Correia at UFC 190, she decided she would rather train in MMA. She trained under Erik Paulson at Combat Submission Wrestling (CSW), competing in Pankration Youth Fights for an undefeated record of 4–0: two armbars, one Americana, and one unanimous decision.

== Mixed martial arts career ==
=== Amateur career ===
Hansen made her amateur debut in September 2017, less than a month and a half after her 18th birthday. The fight took place under Fight Club OC at their Gladiator MMA Championship Series 3. She fought Cecilia Padilla in the flyweight division and won via technical knockout in the first round.

=== Invicta Fighting Championships ===
Hansen made her professional debut as a strawweight at Invicta FC 26: Maia vs. Niedzwiedz. She defeated opponent Emilee Prince within the first two minutes of round one via armbar, making her the youngest fighter to win a fight in IFC history.

Hansen faced Kalyn Schwartz at Invicta FC 28: Mizuki vs. Jandiroba. After receiving an elbow to the temple that caused a bloody cut, she lost the fight via technical knockout in the second round. Hansen's next fight was for California Cage Warriors where she defeated Gabby Romero by third-round TKO.

Hansen returned to Invicta at Invicta FC 31: Jandiroba vs. Morandin in September 2018 with an impressive third-round TKO victory over Helen Peralta. After the bout, Hansen called out undefeated flyweight prospect Erin Blanchfield. Hansen would get that fight at the very next event, Invicta FC 32: Spencer vs. Sorenson, serving as a late replacement for Luanna Alzuguir and moving up to flyweight. Hansen lost to Blanchfield via majority decision.

Hansen bounced back at Invicta FC 33: Frey vs. Grusander II in December 2018, returning to strawweight and defeated Sharon Jacobson via third round submission. Hansen had taken the fight against Jacobson on one week's notice, replacing Kanako Murata. In May 2019, Hansen lost a split decision to Magdaléna Šormová at Invicta FC Phoenix Series 1. In October, Hansen defeated Nicole Caliari via third round submission at Invicta FC 37: Gonzalez vs. Sanchez.

=== Ultimate Fighting Championship ===
Hansen made her UFC debut on June 27, 2020, against Jinh Yu Frey at UFC on ESPN: Poirier vs. Hooker. She won the fight via a submission in round three. This win earned her the Performance of the Night award.

Hansen faced promotional newcomer Cory McKenna on November 14, 2020, at UFC Fight Night: Felder vs. dos Anjos. She lost the fight via unanimous decision.

Hansen was scheduled to face promotional newcomer Cheyanne Vlismas on March 20, 2021, at UFC on ESPN 21. However, Hansen pulled out due to undisclosed reasons and was replaced on March 12 by promotional newcomer Montserrat Ruiz. Later Hansen publicly opened about struggling with eating disorder which led to the withdrawal and time off from the sport.

Hansen was scheduled to face Jasmine Jasudavicius on January 15, 2022, at UFC on ESPN 32. However, the pair was moved to UFC 270 on January 22, 2022, for undisclosed reasons. Hansen lost the fight via unanimous decision.

Hansen faced Piera Rodríguez on April 9, 2022 at UFC 273. At the weigh-ins, Hansen weighed in at 118.5 pounds, 2.5 pounds over the strawweight non-title fight limit. The bout proceeded at a catchweight and she forfeited 20% of her purse which went to Rodríguez. She lost the fight via unanimous decision.

Hansen was released by the UFC in mid April 2022.

=== Return to Invicta Fighting Championships ===
On April 29, 2022, it was announced that Hansen had signed a multi-fight contract with Invicta FC.

She made her debut with the promotion on June 28, 2024 at Invicta FC 55: Bernardo vs. Rubin against Sayury Cañon, winning the bout via split decision.

== Professional grappling career ==
Hansen was scheduled to compete in a flyweight Combat Jiu-Jitsu superfight against Bre Stikk at Medusa 5 on December 28, 2023.

== Championships and accomplishments ==
- Ultimate Fighting Championship
  - Performance of the Night (One time) vs. Jinh Yu Frey
- Invicta Fighting Championships
  - Performance of the Night (one time) vs. Sharon Jacobson
  - Fight of the Night (one time) vs. Nicole Caliari
- Combat Press
  - 2018 Comeback of the Year vs. Sharon Jacobson at Invicta FC 33

== Mixed martial arts record ==
Professional record breakdown
| 14 matches | 8 wins | 6 losses |
| By knockout | 2 | 1 |
| By submission | 4 | 0 |
| By decision | 2 | 5 |

| Res. | Record | Opponent | Method | Event | Date | Round | Time | Location | Notes |
|---|---|---|---|---|---|---|---|---|---|
| Win | 8–6 | Sayury Cañon | Decision (split) | Invicta FC 55 | June 28, 2024 | 3 | 5:00 | Kansas City, Kansas, United States | |
| Loss | 7–6 | Piera Rodríguez | Decision (unanimous) | UFC 273 | April 9, 2022 | 3 | 5:00 | Jacksonville, Florida, United States | Catchweight (118.5 lb) bout; Hansen missed weight. |
| Loss | 7–5 | Jasmine Jasudavicius | Decision (unanimous) | UFC 270 | January 22, 2022 | 3 | 5:00 | Anaheim, California, United States | Flyweight bout. |
| Loss | 7–4 | Cory McKenna | Decision (unanimous) | UFC Fight Night: Felder vs. dos Anjos | November 14, 2020 | 3 | 5:00 | Las Vegas, Nevada, United States | |
| Win | 7–3 | Jinh Yu Frey | Submission (armbar) | UFC on ESPN: Poirier vs. Hooker | June 27, 2020 | 3 | 2:26 | Las Vegas, Nevada, United States | Performance of the Night. |
| Win | 6–3 | Liana Pirosin | Decision (unanimous) | Invicta FC Phoenix Series 3 | March 6, 2020 | 3 | 5:00 | Kansas City, Kansas, United States | |
| Win | 5–3 | Nicole Caliari | Submission (guillotine choke) | Invicta FC 37 | October 4, 2019 | 3 | 1:14 | Kansas City, Kansas, United States | Flyweight bout. Fight of the Night. |
| Loss | 4–3 | Magdaléna Šormová | Decision (split) | Invicta FC Phoenix Series 1 | May 3, 2019 | 3 | 5:00 | Kansas City, Kansas, United States | |
| Win | 4–2 | Sharon Jacobson | Submission (armbar) | Invicta FC 33 | December 15, 2018 | 3 | 4:43 | Kansas City, Missouri, United States | Performance of the Night. |
| Loss | 3–2 | Erin Blanchfield | Decision (majority) | Invicta FC 32 | November 16, 2018 | 3 | 5:00 | Shawnee, Oklahoma, United States | Flyweight bout. |
| Win | 3–1 | Helen Peralta | TKO (elbows) | Invicta FC 31 | September 1, 2018 | 3 | 4:16 | Kansas City, Missouri, United States | Return to Strawweight. |
| Win | 2–1 | Gabby Romero | TKO (punches) | California Cage Wars 7 | July 29, 2018 | 3 | 2:00 | Campo, California, United States | Flyweight debut. |
| Loss | 1–1 | Kalyn Schwartz | TKO (punches) | Invicta FC 28 | March 24, 2018 | 2 | 4:27 | Salt Lake City, Utah, United States | |
| Win | 1–0 | Emilee Prince | Submission (armbar) | Invicta FC 26 | December 8, 2017 | 1 | 1:23 | Kansas City, Missouri, United States | Strawweight debut. |

| Exhibition record breakdown | | |
| 1 match | 1 win | 0 losses |
| By decision | 1 | 0 |

| Res. | Record | Opponent | Method | Event | Date | Round | Time | Location | Notes |
|---|---|---|---|---|---|---|---|---|---|
| Win | 1–0 | Carolina Jimenez | Decision (unanimous) | Invicta Phoenix Series 2 | September 6, 2019 | 1 | 5:00 | Kansas City, Kansas, United States | Flyweight tournament reserve bout. Exhibition bout. |

=== Amateur record ===
Professional record breakdown
| 1 match | 1 win | 0 losses |
| By knockout | 1 | 0 |

| Res. | Record | Opponent | Method | Event | Date | Round | Time | Location | Notes |
|---|---|---|---|---|---|---|---|---|---|
| Win | 1–0 | Cecilia Pedilla | TKO (punches) | Gladiator MMA Championship Series 3 | September 23, 2017 | 1 | 1:43 | Los Angeles, California, United States | Amateur Debut |

== Professional boxing record ==
| 5 fights | 1 win | 4 losses |
|---|---|---|
| By decision | 1 | 4 |

| No. | Result | Record | Opponent | Type | Round, time | Date | Location | Notes |
|---|---|---|---|---|---|---|---|---|
| 5 | Loss | 1–4 | (United States) Shurretta Metcalf | UD | 4, 2:00 | Mar 15, 2019 | (United States) Southern Junction Nightclub, Irving, Texas | |
| 4 | Loss | 1–3 | (United States) Jessica Juarez | MD | 4, 2:00 | Jan 31, 2019 | (United States) Viejas Casino & Resort, Alpine, California | |
| 3 | Win | 1–2 | (United States) Veronica Torres | UD | 4, 2:00 | Jul 20, 2018 | (United States) San Joaquin County Fairgrounds, Stockton, California | |
| 2 | Loss | 0–2 | (United States) Marcia Agripino | MD | 4, 2:00 | Jun 2, 2018 | (United States) Foxwoods Resort, Mashantucket, Connecticut | |
| 1 | Loss | 0–1 | (Kazakhstan) Aida Satybaldinova | UD | 4, 2:00 | Apr 18, 2018 | (United States) Westin Bonaventura Hotel, Los Angeles, California | |

== See also ==
- List of current Invicta FC fighters
- List of female mixed martial artists
