= UFC 270 =

UFC mixed martial arts event in 2022

UFC 270: Ngannou vs. Gane
- The poster for UFC 270: Ngannou vs. Gane
- Promotion: Ultimate Fighting Championship
- Date: January 22, 2022
- Venue: Honda Center
- City: Anaheim, California, United States
- Attendance: 17,387
- Total gate: $5,290,213

Event chronology
UFC on ESPN: Kattar vs. Chikadze	UFC 270: Ngannou vs. Gane	UFC Fight Night: Hermansson vs. Strickland

UFC 270: Ngannou vs. Gane was a mixed martial arts event produced by the Ultimate Fighting Championship that took place on January 22, 2022, at the Honda Center in Anaheim, California.

== Background ==
A UFC Heavyweight Championship title unification bout between current champion Francis Ngannou and interim champion Ciryl Gane served as the event headliner.

A UFC Flyweight Championship trilogy bout between current champion Brandon Moreno and former champion Deiveson Figueiredo took place at the event. The pairing first met at UFC 256 on December 12, 2020, which ended in a majority draw (Figueiredo retained the title). Their second meeting took place at UFC 263 on June 12, 2021, where Moreno captured the title by submission in the third round. The rematch was originally expected to take place at UFC 269, but it was moved to this event.

A middleweight bout between Jared Cannonier and Derek Brunson was scheduled for the event. However, the pairing was moved to UFC 271 three weeks later.

A women's flyweight bout between Kay Hansen and Jasmine Jasudavicius was scheduled for UFC on ESPN: Kattar vs. Chikadze. However, the pairing was moved to this event due to undisclosed reasons.

The Ultimate Fighter: Brazil 3 middleweight winner Warlley Alves was expected to face Jack Della Maddalena in a welterweight bout. However, Alves pulled out in early January due to undisclosed reasons and he was replaced by promotional newcomer Pete Rodriguez.

A women's flyweight between Viviane Araújo and Alexa Grasso was scheduled for the event. However, Araújo was forced to pull out from the event due to injury and the bout was cancelled.

A featherweight bout between undefeated prospects Movsar Evloev and Ilia Topuria was scheduled for the event. However, Evloev withdrew from the bout due to undisclosed reasons. He was replaced by Charles Jourdain. In turn, Topuria withdrew from the bout just before the weigh in due to a medical issue from cutting weight and the bout was scrapped.

Poliana Botelho and Ji Yeon Kim were expected to meet in a women's flyweight bout at UFC on ESPN: Reyes vs. Procházka in May 2021, but Kim pulled out due to an injury. They were then rescheduled for this event, but Botelho pulled out instead and the pairing was scrapped.

A women's strawweight bout between Vanessa Demopoulos and Silvana Gómez Juárez was initially scheduled for UFC on ESPN: Kattar vs. Chikadze a week earlier, but it was pushed back to this event.

A heavyweight bout between Alexey Oleynik and Greg Hardy was expected to take place at the event. However, on January 13, Oleynik withdrew from the event due to undisclosed reasons and was replaced by Sergey Spivak. In turn, just a week before the event Hardy withdrew due to a finger injury and the bout was removed from the event. The pair was moved to UFC 272.

Four-time Brazilian Jiu-Jitsu World Champion Rodolfo Vieira was expected to face Wellington Turman in a middleweight bout at the event. However, Vieira pulled out in the days leading up to the event and the bout was cancelled.

== Results ==
Main card
Weight class				Method	Round	Time	Notes
Heavyweight	Francis Ngannou (c)	def.	Ciryl Gane (ic)	Decision (unanimous) (48–47, 48–47, 49–46)	5	5:00	(Note: For the UFC Heavyweight Championship.)
Flyweight	Deiveson Figueiredo	def.	Brandon Moreno (c)	Decision (unanimous) (48–47, 48–47, 48–47)	5	5:00	(Note: For the UFC Flyweight Championship.)
Welterweight	Michel Pereira	def.	André Fialho	Decision (unanimous) (29–28, 29–28, 29–28)	3	5:00
Bantamweight	Said Nurmagomedov	def.	Cody Stamann	Submission (guillotine choke)	1	0:47
Welterweight	Michael Morales	def.	Trevin Giles	TKO (punches)	1	4:06
Preliminary card (ESPN / ESPN+)
Bantamweight	Victor Henry	def.	Raoni Barcelos	Decision (unanimous) (30–27, 30–27, 30–27)	3	5:00
Welterweight	Jack Della Maddalena	def.	Pete Rodriguez	TKO (punches)	1	2:59
Bantamweight	Tony Gravely	def.	Saimon Oliveira	Decision (unanimous) (30–27, 30–27, 30–27)	3	5:00
Lightweight	Matt Frevola	def.	Genaro Valdéz	TKO (punches)	1	3:15
Early preliminary card (ESPN+ / UFC Fight Pass)
Women's Strawweight	Vanessa Demopoulos	def.	Silvana Gómez Juárez	Submission (armbar)	1	2:25
Women's Flyweight	Jasmine Jasudavicius	def.	Kay Hansen	Decision (unanimous) (30–27, 29–28, 29–28)	3	5:00

== Bonus awards ==
The following fighters received $50,000 bonuses.

- Fight of the Night: Deiveson Figueiredo vs. Brandon Moreno
- Performance of the Night: Said Nurmagomedov and Vanessa Demopoulos

== Reported payout ==
The following is the reported payout to the fighters as reported to the California State Athletic Commission. The amounts do not include sponsor money, discretionary bonuses, viewership points or additional earnings. The total disclosed payout for the event was $2,026,000.

- Francis Ngannou: $600,000 (no win bonus) def. Ciryl Gane: $500,000
- Deiveson Figueiredo: $150,000 (no win bonus) def. Brandon Moreno: $200,000
- Michel Pereira: $100,000 (includes $50,000 win bonus) def. André Fialho: $12,000
- Said Nurmagomedov: $50,000 (includes $25,000 win bonus) def. Cody Stamann: $65,000
- Michael Morales: $20,000 (includes $10,000 win bonus) def. Trevin Giles: $45,000
- Victor Henry: $40,000 (includes $20,000 win bonus) def. Raoni Barcelos: $29,000
- Jack Della Maddalena: $20,000 (includes $10,000 win bonus) def. Pete Rodriguez: $12,000
- Tony Gravely: $44,000 (includes $22,000 win bonus) def. Saimon Oliveira: $10,000
- Matt Frevola: $46,000 (includes $23,000 win bonus) def. Genaro Valdéz: $10,000
- Vanessa Demopoulos: $24,000 (includes $12,000 win bonus) def. Silvana Gómez Juárez: $12,000
- Jasmine Jasudavicius: $20,000 (includes $10,000 win bonus) def. Kay Hansen: $17,000

== See also ==
- List of UFC events
- List of current UFC fighters
- 2022 in UFC
