= Caitlin Sammons =

American mixed martial arts (MMA) fighter

- Born: October 31, 1993 (age 32)
- Other names: Ginger
- Nationality: American
- Height: 5 ft 4 in (163 cm)
- Division: Flyweight (115—125 Ib)
- Reach: 65 in (165 cm)
- Fighting out of: Orlando, Florida, United States
- Team: Ironlife Athletics
- Teacher: Aaron "Coringa" Conway
- Years active: 2019–present

Mixed martial arts record
- Total: 5
- Wins: 3
- By knockout: 1
- By submission: 1
- By decision: 1
- Losses: 2
- By knockout: 1
- By decision: 1

Other information
- Mixed martial arts record from Sherdog

Caitlin Sammons (born October 31, 1993) is an American mixed martial artist who competes in the flyweight division. She has previously competed in the Invicta Fighting Championships.

== Mixed martial arts career ==
=== Invicta Fighting Championships ===
Sammons made her Invicta debut on February 15, 2019, against Christina Ricker at Invicta FC 34. She won the fight by technical knockout in round two.

Her next fight came on August 9, 2019, facing Chantel Coates at Invicta FC 36. She won the fight via a rear-naked choke in round two.

On July 30, 2020, Sammons faced Claire Guthrie at Invicta FC 41. She won the fight via split decision.

Sammons faced Stephanie Geltmacher on November 20, 2020, at Invicta FC 43. She lost the fight via knockout in round one.

Simmons faced Helen Peralta at Invicta FC 44: A New Era on August 27, 2021. Simmons lost via unanimous decision.

== Personal life ==
Simmons graduated with a bachelor's degree in Sports and Exercise Science.

== Mixed martial arts record ==
Professional record breakdown
5 matches	3 wins	2 losses
By knockout	1	1
By submission	1	0
By decision	1	1

Res.	Record	Opponent	Method	Event	Date	Round	Time	Location	Notes
Loss	3–2	Helen Peralta	Decision (unanimous)	Invicta FC 44	August 27, 2021	3	5:00	Kansas City, Kansas, United States	
Loss	3–1	Stephanie Geltmacher	KO (punches)	Invicta FC 43	November 20, 2020	1	4:28	Atlantic City, New Jersey, United States	
Win	3–0	Claire Guthrie	Decision (split)	Invicta FC 41	July 30, 2020	3	5:00	Salt Lake City, Utah, United States	
Win	2–0	Chantel Coates	Submission (rear-naked choke)	Invicta FC 36	August 9, 2018	2	4:10	Kansas City, Missouri, United States	
Win	1–0	Christina Ricker	TKO (elbows and punches)	Invicta FC 34	February 15, 2019	2	3:02	Kansas City, Missouri, United States	
