= James Brogan (footballer, born 1890) =

Scottish footballer

Personal information
- Full name: James Brogan
- Date of birth: 1890
- Place of birth: Burnbank, Scotland
- Position: Inside forward

Senior career*
Years	Team	Apps	(Gls)
1910–1915	Bristol Rovers	106	(24)
1918–1919	Airdrieonians	14	(4)
1919–1920	Bathgate		
1920–1922	St Bernard's	15	(3)
Total		135	(31)
- * Club domestic league appearances and goals

James Brogan (born 1890) was a professional footballer who played for Bristol Rovers prior to the First World War.

Brogan joined Rovers in 1910, having previously been playing football in Glasgow. He made 106 Southern League appearances at inside forward and scored 24 goals prior to the outbreak of war, and was Rovers' top goalscorer in the 1912–13 season with eleven goals. After the conflict he played in Scotland with Airdrieonians and St Bernard's.

== Sources ==
- Byrne, Stephen; Jay, Mike (2003). Bristol Rovers Football Club – The Definitive History 1883-2003. Stroud: Tempus. p. 489. ISBN 0-7524-2717-2.
