= Brogan Walker =

American mixed martial artist

- Born: August 2, 1988 (age 38); California, United States
- Other names: The Bear
- Height: 5 ft 4 in (1.63 m)
- Weight: 126 lb (57 kg; 9 st 0 lb)
- Division: Flyweight
- Reach: 67 in (170 cm)
- Fighting out of: Hagåtña, Guam
- Team: Elite Muay Thai; Purebred BJJ Guam
- Trainer: 2014–present
- Rank: Black belt in Brazilian Jiu-Jitsu

Mixed martial arts record
- Total: 11
- Wins: 7
- By submission: 1
- By decision: 6
- Losses: 4
- By knockout: 1
- By decision: 3

Other information
- Mixed martial arts record from Sherdog

Brogan Walker (born August 2, 1988) is an American mixed martial artist who competed in the Flyweight division in the Ultimate Fighting Championship (UFC) and Invicta Fighting Championships.

== Background ==
Walker was born in California, United States. She moved to Guam after she married her Guamanian husband, Mike Sanchez. She represents Guam when competing in MMA.

== Mixed martial arts career ==
=== Early career ===
Walker fought under Pacific Xtreme Combat and amassed a record of 4–0 prior to getting signed by Invicta Fighting Championships.

=== Invicta Fighting Championships ===
Walker made her Invicta debut on January 13, 2018, against Cheri Muraski at Invicta FC 27. She won the fight via split decision.

Her next fight came on July 21, 2018, facing Miranda Maverick at Invicta FC 30. She won the fight via unanimous decision.

On October 4, 2019, Walker faced Pearl Gonzalez at Invicta FC 37. She lost the fight via unanimous decision.

Walker faced Erin Blanchfield at Invicta FC 41 on July 30, 2020, as a late notice replacement for Stephanie Geltmacher. She lost the fight by unanimous decision.

Walker faced Emilee King at Invicta FC 44 on August 27, 2021. She won the fight by a first-round submission, forcing King to tap with a rear naked choke near the end of the round.

=== The Ultimate Fighter ===
In February 2022, Walker was announced as a cast member of The Ultimate Fighter: Team Peña vs. Team Nunes. She was selected third by Julianna Peña in the fighter selections. In her first fight in the house, she faced Hannah Guy and won by majority decision. In the semi-finals, she faced Laura Gallardo and won by unanimous decision to advance to the finals.

=== Ultimate Fighting Championship ===
In the TUF 30 finals, Walker faced Juliana Miller on August 6, 2022, at UFC on ESPN 40. She lost the fight via technical knockout in round three.

Walker was scheduled to face Liang Na on March 25, 2023, at UFC on ESPN 43. However, Liang pulled out due to undisclosed reasons and Walker was moved to UFC Fight Night 222 a month later on April 22 as a replacement against Iasmin Lucindo. She lost the fight via unanimous decision.

After a two-and-a-half-year layoff, Walker made her return against Veronica Hardy on October 4, 2025 at UFC 320. She lost the fight by unanimous decision.

On October 15, 2025, it was reported that Walker was removed from the UFC roster.

== Mixed martial arts record ==
Professional record breakdown
12 matches	7 wins	5 losses
By knockout	0	1
By submission	1	0
By decision	6	4

Res.	Record	Opponent	Method	Event	Date	Round	Time	Location	Notes
Loss	7–5	Veronica Hardy	Decision (unanimous)	UFC 320	October 4, 2025	3	5:00	Las Vegas, Nevada, United States	
Loss	7–4	Iasmin Lucindo	Decision (unanimous)	UFC Fight Night: Pavlovich vs. Blaydes	April 22, 2023	3	5:00	Las Vegas, Nevada, United States	
Loss	7–3	Juliana Miller	TKO (punches and elbows)	UFC on ESPN: Santos vs. Hill	August 6, 2022	3	3:57	Las Vegas, Nevada, United States	The Ultimate Fighter 30 Women's Flyweight Tournament Final.
Win	7–2	Emilee King	Submission (rear-naked choke)	Invicta FC 44	August 27, 2021	1	4:28	Kansas City, Kansas, United States	Walker was deducted 1 point in round 1 due to an illegal knee. Performance of the Night.
Loss	6–2	Erin Blanchfield	Decision (unanimous)	Invicta FC 41	July 30, 2020	3	5:00	Kansas City, Kansas, United States	
Loss	6–1	Pearl Gonzalez	Decision (unanimous)	Invicta FC 37	October 4, 2019	3	5:00	Kansas City, Kansas, United States	
Win	6–0	Miranda Maverick	Decision (unanimous)	Invicta FC 30	July 21, 2018	3	5:00	Kansas City, Missouri, United States	
Win	5–0	Cheri Muraski	Decision (split)	Invicta FC 27	January 13, 2018	3	5:00	Kansas City, Missouri, United States	
Win	4–0	Kate Da Silva	Decision (unanimous)	Pacific Xtreme Combat 54	July 8, 2016	3	5:00	Mangila, Guam	
Win	3–0	Emiko Raika	Decision (unanimous)	Pacific Xtreme Combat 50	December 4, 2015	3	5:00	Mangila, Guam	
Win	2–0	Gabby Romero	Decision (unanimous)	Pacific Xtreme Combat 49	August 7, 2015	3	5:00	Mangila, Guam	
Win	1–0	Jung Yoo-jin	Decision (unanimous)	Pacific Xtreme Combat 45	October 24, 2014	3	5:00	Mangila, Guam	Flyweight debut.

Exhibition record breakdown		
2 matches	2 wins	0 losses
By decision	2	0

Res.	Record	Opponent	Method	Event	Date	Round	Time	Location	Notes
Win	2–0	Laura Gallardo	Decision (unanimous)	The Ultimate Fighter: Team Peña vs. Team Nunes	July 5, 2022 (airdate)	3	5:00	Las Vegas, Nevada, United States	TUF 30 Semi-final.
Win	1–0	Hannah Guy	Decision (majority)	The Ultimate Fighter: Team Peña vs. Team Nunes	June 21, 2022 (airdate)	2	5:00	Las Vegas, Nevada, United States	TUF 30 Quarter-final.

== See also ==
- List of female mixed martial artists
