= Brogan Crowley =

British skeleton athlete

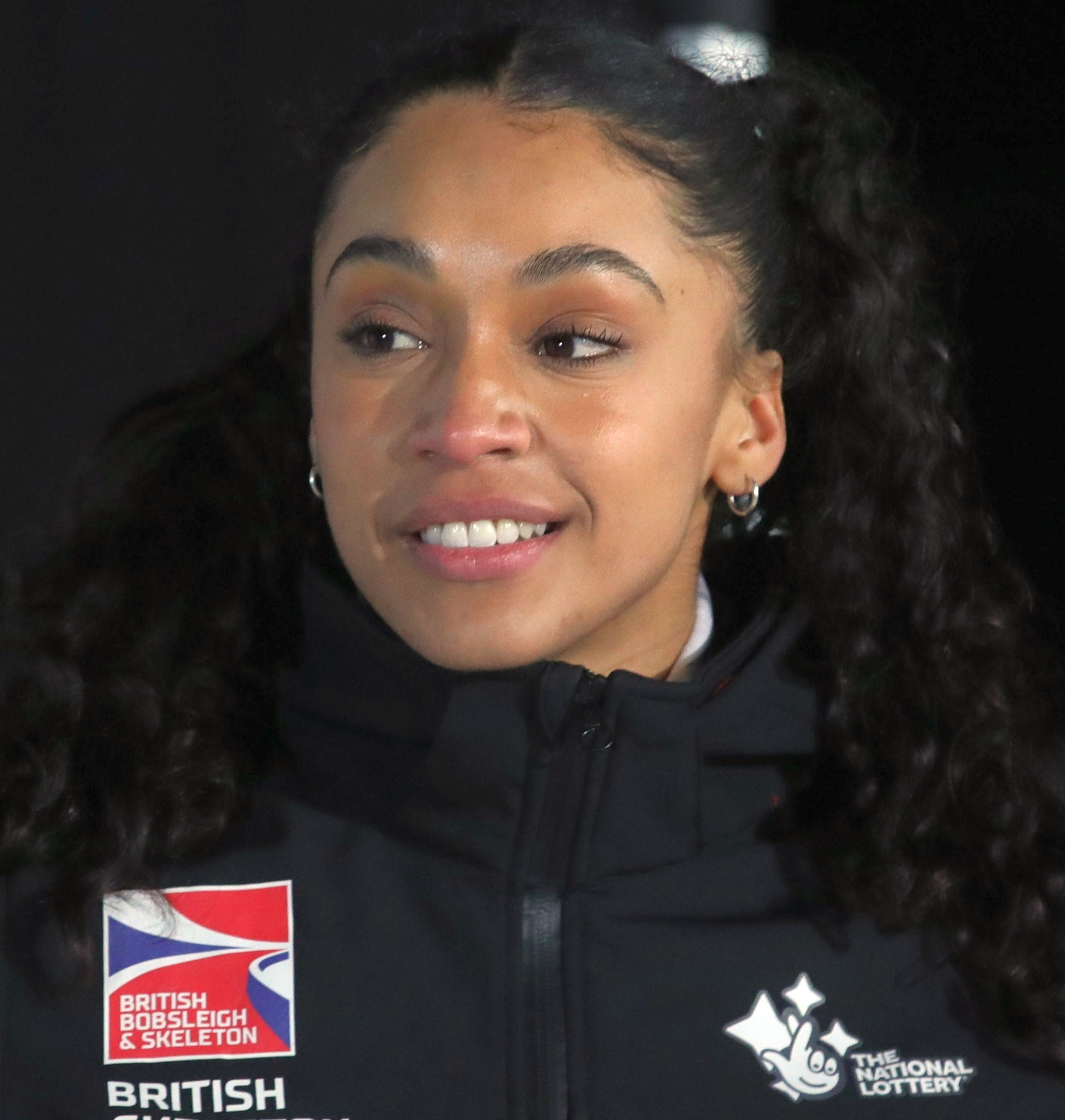
- Brogan Crowley in 2023

Personal information
- Nationality: British
- Born: 20 July 1994 (age 31) Saddleworth, Great Britain

Sport
- Country: (United Kingdom) Great Britain
- Sport: Skeleton

Brogan Crowley (born 20 July 1994) is a British skeleton athlete who competed in the women's skeleton at the 2022 Olympic Winter Games.
