= UFC 269 =

2021 MMA event

UFC 269: Oliveira vs. Poirier
- The poster for UFC 269: Oliveira vs. Poirier
- Promotion: Ultimate Fighting Championship
- Date: December 11, 2021
- Venue: T-Mobile Arena
- City: Paradise, Nevada, United States
- Attendance: 18,471
- Total gate: $8,000,000
- Buyrate: 500,000

Event chronology
UFC on ESPN: Font vs. Aldo	UFC 269: Oliveira vs. Poirier	UFC Fight Night: Lewis vs. Daukaus

UFC 269: Oliveira vs. Poirier was a mixed martial arts event produced by the Ultimate Fighting Championship that took place on December 11, 2021, at the T-Mobile Arena in Paradise, Nevada, part of the Las Vegas Metropolitan Area, United States.

== Background ==
A UFC Lightweight Championship bout between current champion Charles Oliveira and former interim champion Dustin Poirier served as the event headliner.

A UFC Women's Bantamweight Championship bout between current champion Amanda Nunes (also current UFC Women's Featherweight Champion) and The Ultimate Fighter: Team Rousey vs. Team Tate bantamweight winner Julianna Peña took place at the event. The pairing was previously scheduled to take place at UFC 265, but it was postponed after Nunes tested positive for COVID-19.

A UFC Flyweight Championship trilogy bout between current champion Brandon Moreno and former champion Deiveson Figueiredo was expected to take place at the event. The pairing first met at UFC 256 on December 12, 2020, resulting in a majority draw (Figueiredo retained the title). Their second meeting took place at UFC 263 on June 12, where Moreno captured the title by submission in the third round. Subsequently, the bout was moved to UFC 270 due to the addition of a welterweight bout between Jorge Masvidal and Leon Edwards. Masvidal later withdrew due to injury in early November and the bout was scrapped.

A flyweight bout between former title challenger Alex Perez and Matt Schnell had been rescheduled for UFC Fight Night: Brunson vs. Till. They were originally expected to meet at UFC 262, before Perez was forced to pull out due to undisclosed reasons. They were then booked again at UFC on ESPN: Barboza vs. Chikadze, before being shifted to this event. However, the bout was yet again postponed for unknown reasons to this event. At the weigh-ins, Perez weighed in at 126.25 pounds (57.27 kg), which was 0.25 pounds (0.11 kg) over the flyweight non-title fight limit. Shortly after, officials announced that the bout had been cancelled as Schnell was forced to withdraw due to a medical issue.

A women's flyweight bout between Montana De La Rosa and Maycee Barber was expected to take place at the event. However, De La Rosa pulled out of the fight in early October citing injury and she was replaced by Erin Blanchfield. In turn, Barber withdrew in early November due to undisclosed reasons. Miranda Maverick was announced as her replacement.

A middleweight bout between André Muniz and Dricus Du Plessis was scheduled for the event. However, Du Plessis withdrew from the event due to injury and was replaced by Eryk Anders.

A heavyweight bout between Augusto Sakai and Tai Tuivasa was scheduled for UFC Fight Night: Vieira vs. Tate, but it was scrapped due to visa issues. It took place at this event instead.

At the weigh-ins, Priscila Cachoeira weighed in at 129 pounds, 3 pounds over the flyweight non-title fight limit. Her bout proceeded at a catchweight and she was fined 30% of her purse, which went to her opponent Gillian Robertson.

== Results ==
Main card
Weight class				Method	Round	Time	Notes
Lightweight	Charles Oliveira (c)	def.	Dustin Poirier	Submission (rear-naked choke)	3	1:02	(Note: For the UFC Lightweight Championship.)
Women's Bantamweight	Julianna Peña	def.	Amanda Nunes (c)	Submission (rear-naked choke)	2	3:26	(Note: For the UFC Women's Bantamweight Championship.)
Welterweight	Geoff Neal	def.	Santiago Ponzinibbio	Decision (split) (28–29, 30–27, 29–28)	3	5:00
Flyweight	Kai Kara-France	def.	Cody Garbrandt	TKO (punches)	1	3:21
Bantamweight	Sean O'Malley	def.	Raulian Paiva	TKO (punches)	1	4:42
Preliminary card (ESPN2 / ESPN+)
Featherweight	Josh Emmett	def.	Dan Ige	Decision (unanimous) (29–28, 29–28, 30–27)	3	5:00
Bantamweight	Dominick Cruz	def.	Pedro Munhoz	Decision (unanimous) (29–28, 29–28, 29–28)	3	5:00
Heavyweight	Tai Tuivasa	def.	Augusto Sakai	KO (punches)	2	0:26
Middleweight	Bruno Silva	def.	Jordan Wright	TKO (punches)	1	1:28
Early preliminary card (ESPN+ / UFC Fight Pass)
Middleweight	André Muniz	def.	Eryk Anders	Submission (armbar)	1	3:13
Women's Flyweight	Erin Blanchfield	def.	Miranda Maverick	Decision (unanimous) (30–27, 30–27, 30–27)	3	5:00
Featherweight	Ryan Hall	def.	Darrick Minner	Decision (unanimous) (30–27, 30–27, 29–27)	3	5:00
Bantamweight	Tony Kelley	def.	Randy Costa	TKO (elbows)	2	4:15
Catchweight (129 lb)	Gillian Robertson	def.	Priscila Cachoeira	Submission (rear-naked choke)	1	4:59

== Bonus awards ==
The following fighters received $50,000 bonuses.

- Fight of the Night: Dominick Cruz vs. Pedro Munhoz
- Performance of the Night: Charles Oliveira, Julianna Peña, Kai Kara-France, Sean O'Malley, Tai Tuivasa, and Bruno Silva

== See also ==
- List of UFC events
- List of current UFC fighters
- 2021 in UFC
