= UFC 265 =

Mixed martial arts event in 2021

UFC 265: Lewis vs. Gane
- The poster for UFC 265: Lewis vs. Gane
- Promotion: Ultimate Fighting Championship
- Date: August 7, 2021
- Venue: Toyota Center
- City: Houston, Texas, United States
- Attendance: 16,604
- Total gate: $3,460,000

Event chronology
UFC on ESPN: Hall vs. Strickland	UFC 265: Lewis vs. Gane	UFC on ESPN: Cannonier vs. Gastelum

UFC 265: Lewis vs. Gane was a mixed martial arts event produced by the Ultimate Fighting Championship that took place on August 7, 2021, at the Toyota Center in Houston, Texas, United States.

== Background ==
An interim UFC Heavyweight Championship bout between former title challenger Derrick Lewis and Ciryl Gane headlined the event. The original plan was to feature current champion Francis Ngannou defending his title against Lewis, but the promotion opted to move forward with the interim contest due to the alleged refusal of the champion to defend it in August (despite winning the championship just over four months earlier and claiming he was available for his first defense in September).

A UFC Women's Bantamweight Championship bout between the current champion Amanda Nunes (also the current UFC Women's Featherweight Champion) and The Ultimate Fighter: Team Rousey vs. Team Tate bantamweight winner Julianna Peña was expected to take place at the event. However on July 29, the bout was pulled due to Nunes testing positive for COVID-19. The bout was rescheduled for UFC 269.

Johnny Muñoz Jr. and Jamey Simmons were expected to meet in a bantamweight bout at UFC 261, but the latter pulled out due to undisclosed reasons. They were later rescheduled for this event.

A middleweight bout between Uriah Hall and Sean Strickland was expected to take place at this event. However, the pairing was moved to the week prior and headlined UFC on ESPN: Hall vs. Strickland.

A women's strawweight rematch between Tecia Torres and former Invicta FC Strawweight Champion Angela Hill took place at this event. The pairing met previously at UFC 188 in June 2015, when Torres won by unanimous decision. The rematch was originally scheduled to take place in December 2020 at UFC 256, but Hill tested positive for COVID-19 during the week leading up to the event and was removed from the bout.

A bantamweight bout between Miles Johns and Anderson dos Santos took place at this event. The pair was scheduled to meet at UFC on ESPN: Makhachev vs. Moisés, but it was removed just hours before the show due to COVID-19 protocol issues stemming from dos Santos' camp.

At the weigh-ins, former Rizin Bantamweight Champion Manel Kape weighed in at 129 pounds, three pounds over the flyweight non-title fight limit. His bout proceeded at a catchweight and he forfeited 20% of his purse to his opponent Ode' Osbourne.

== Results ==
Main card
Weight class				Method	Round	Time	Notes
Heavyweight	Ciryl Gane	def.	Derrick Lewis	TKO (punches)	3	4:11	(Note: For the interim UFC Heavyweight Championship.)
Bantamweight	José Aldo	def.	Pedro Munhoz	Decision (unanimous) (30–27, 30–27, 30–27)	3	5:00
Welterweight	Vicente Luque	def.	Michael Chiesa	Submission (D’Arce choke)	1	3:25
Women's Strawweight	Tecia Torres	def.	Angela Hill	Decision (unanimous) (30–27, 30–27, 29–28)	3	5:00
Bantamweight	Song Yadong	def.	Casey Kenney	Decision (split) (28–29, 29–28, 30–27)	3	5:00
Preliminary card (ESPN2 / ESPN+)
Lightweight	Rafael Fiziev	def.	Bobby Green	Decision (unanimous) (30–27, 29–28, 29–28)	3	5:00
Bantamweight	Vince Morales	def.	Drako Rodriguez	Decision (unanimous) (30–27, 29–28, 29–28)	3	5:00
Light Heavyweight	Alonzo Menifield	def.	Ed Herman	Decision (unanimous) (30–27, 30–27, 30–27)	3	5:00
Women's Strawweight	Jessica Penne	def.	Karolina Kowalkiewicz	Submission (armbar)	1	4:32
Early preliminary card (ESPN2 / ESPN+ / UFC Fight Pass)
Catchweight (129 lb)	Manel Kape	def.	Ode' Osbourne	KO (flying knee and punches)	1	4:44
Bantamweight	Miles Johns	def.	Anderson dos Santos	KO (punch)	3	1:16
Women's Flyweight	Melissa Gatto	def.	Victoria Leonardo	TKO (doctor stoppage)	2	5:00
Bantamweight	Johnny Muñoz Jr.	def.	Jamey Simmons	Submission (rear-naked choke)	2	2:35

== Bonus awards ==
The following fighters received $50,000 bonuses.

- Fight of the Night: Rafael Fiziev vs. Bobby Green
- Performance of the Night: Ciryl Gane, Vicente Luque, Jessica Penne, and Miles Johns

== See also ==
- List of UFC events
- List of current UFC fighters
- 2021 in UFC
