= Joseph Brogan =

American politician

Joseph H. Brogan

Member of the Missouri Senate from the 33rd district

Personal details
- Born: March 30, 1880 St. Louis, Missouri
- Died: July 22, 1940 (aged 60) Richmond Heights, Missouri
- Party: Democratic
- Education: Saint Louis University

Joseph H. Brogan (March 30, 1880 – July 22, 1940) was an American politician from who served in the Missouri Senate. Brogan was educated in parochial schools and at Saint Louis University.
