= Broccán Clóen =

7th-century Irish cleric

Saint Broccán Clóen
- Born: Ireland
- Died: 7th century Ireland
- Venerated in: Roman Catholic Church, Eastern Orthodox Church
- Feast: September 17th

Broccán Clóen was an Irish cleric who lived in the sixth or seventh century.

Several persons noted for their holiness seem to have borne this name, which is variously written Brogan, Broccan, Bracan, and even Bearchan and Bearchanus.

Of these, two are commemorated in the Félire Óengusso, the early date of which (c. 800) is now generally admitted. There, under 8 July, is written: "Brocan, the scribe, gained a noble triumph without any fall"; and under 17 September: "Brocan of Ross Tuirc thou shouldst declare".

John Colgan (Trias Thaumaturga, p. 518) speaks as if he were inclined to identify both these persons with the author of an early Irish hymn upon Brigid of Kildare. The glosses upon Aengus and the Martyrology of Gorman, while seemingly treating them as distinct, prove that the matter admits of no certainty.

Some modern hagiographers are inclined to regard the Broccán of 8 July as the amanuensis and possibly the nephew of Patrick. They style him bishop and locate him at "Maethail-Brogain", now Mothil in Waterford; but this is admittedly quite doubtful. Broccán of Rosstuirc (of 17 September), on the other hand, is identified with the author of the hymn to Brigid of Kildare, and believed to be the Abbot Brochanus referred to in the Life of St. Abban, preserved in the Codex Salmanticensis. ("Rosstuirc" is generally assigned to the Diocese of Ossory, and may be Rossmore in County Laois) in the northern portion of the kingdom of Osraige in the Slieve Bloom Mountains.
