= Erin Blanchfield =

American mixed martial artist (born 1999)

- Born: May 4, 1999 (age 27); New York City, New York, U.S.
- Other names: Cold Blooded
- Height: 5 ft 4 in (163 cm)
- Weight: 125 lb (57 kg; 8 st 13 lb)
- Division: Flyweight
- Reach: 68 in (173 cm)
- Style: Brazilian Jiu-Jitsu
- Fighting out of: Elmwood Park, New Jersey, U.S.
- Team: Renzo Gracie Academy; Danaher Death Squad; Silver Fox BJJ; MK Muay Thai
- Rank: Black belt in Brazilian Jiu-Jitsu under Karel Pravec
- Years active: 2018–present

Mixed martial arts record
- Total: 17
- Wins: 14
- By knockout: 2
- By submission: 5
- By decision: 7
- Losses: 3
- By decision: 3

Other information
- Mixed martial arts record from Sherdog

Erin Blanchfield (born May 4, 1999) is an American mixed martial artist currently competing in the women's Flyweight division of the Ultimate Fighting Championship (UFC). She is a former Eddie Bravo Invitational champion. As of October 17, 2026, she is #5 in the Meta UFC women's flyweight rankings, and as of November 17, 2026, she is #11 in the UFC women's pound-for-pound rankings.

== Background ==
A native of Elmwood Park, New Jersey, Blanchfield started training jiu-jitsu at the age of seven. Two years later, she started competing in kickboxing and grappling tournaments. By the age of 12, she decided she wanted to be a professional fighter.

== Mixed martial arts career ==
=== Early career ===
Blanchfield fought under Fighting Championships and amassed a record of 1–0 prior to being signed by Invicta Fighting Championships.

=== Invicta Fighting Championships ===
Blanchfield made her Invicta debut on March 17, 2018, against Brittney Cloudy at Invicta FC 30. She won the fight by split decision.

Her next fight came on November 16, 2018, facing Kay Hansen at Invicta FC 32. She won the fight via majority decision.

On February 15, 2019, Blanchfield faced Tracy Cortez at Invicta FC 34. She lost the fight via split decision.

Blanchfield faced Gabriella Gulfin on June 4, 2019 at Cage Fury Fighting Championships 76. She won the fight via submission in round one.

On February 7, 2020, Blanchfield returned to Invicta, facing Victoria Leonardo at Invicta FC 39. In the second round Blanchfield dropped Leonardo with a head kick, finishing off the technical knockout victory with punches.

=== Ultimate Fighting Championship ===
Blanchfield was expected to make her UFC debut as a short notice replacement for Bea Malecki against Norma Dumont on April 10, 2021 at UFC on ABC 2 in a Bantamweight bout. In turn, the bout was pulled from the card by after Dumont missed weight by 3.5lbs.

Blanchfield faced Sarah Alpar on September 18, 2021 at UFC Fight Night 192. She won the fight via unanimous decision.

Blanchfield was expected to face Maycee Barber, replacing Montana De La Rosa, on December 11, 2021 at UFC 269. However, Barber withdrew in early November due to undisclosed reasons, and she was replaced by Miranda Maverick. Blanchfield won the fight by unanimous decision. She furthermore set the women's flyweight single-fight takedown record, with eight total takedowns.

Blanchfield faced JJ Aldrich on June 4, 2022 at UFC Fight Night 207. She won the bout via guillotine choke in the second round.

Blanchfield faced Molly McCann on November 12, 2022 at UFC 281. She won the fight via a kimura submission in the first round.

Blanchfield was scheduled to face Taila Santos on February 18, 2023 at UFC Fight Night 219. When the main event fight between Cory Sandhagen and Marlon Vera was rescheduled for another event, Blanchfield's fight against Santos was moved up to serve as the main event. Santos dropped out of the bout after her cornermen were denied visas into the United States, and was replaced by former UFC Women's Strawweight Champion Jéssica Andrade. Blanchfield won the fight via submission in round two. This win earned her the Performance of the Night award.

The match with Taila Santos was rebooked and took place on August 26, 2023, at UFC Fight Night 225. Blanchfield won the bout via unanimous decision.

Blanchfield faced Manon Fiorot on March 30, 2024, at UFC on ESPN 54. She lost the fight via unanimous decision.

Blanchfield faced former two-time UFC Women's Strawweight Champion Rose Namajunas on November 2, 2024, in the main event at UFC Fight Night 246. The bout was later shifted to the co-main event but remained five rounds. She won the fight by unanimous decision.

Blanchfield was scheduled to face Maycee Barber in the main event on May 31, 2025, at UFC on ESPN 68. At the weigh-ins, Barber weighed in at 126.5 pounds, half a pound over the women's flyweight non-title fight limit. The bout was set to be at catchweight and Barber was to be fined 20 percent of her purse which was to go to Blanchfield. However, minutes before the walkouts were to take place, Barber had to withdraw due to a medical issue involving a seizure and the bout was cancelled.

Blanchfield faced Tracy Cortez in a rematch on November 15, 2025, at UFC 322. She won the fight via a rear-naked choke submission in the second round.

Blanchfield was scheduled to face Jasmine Jasudavicius on August 15, 2026, at UFC 330. However, Blanchfield withdrew due to injury and the bout was rescheduled for UFC Fight Night 291 which will take place on October 17, 2026. Blanchfield lost the fight by unanimous decision.

== Personal life ==
Until 2021, Blanchfield was studying Television and Digital Media with a concentration in sports media at Montclair State University, with an aim to becoming a commentator. Blanchfield is the daughter of George and Betsy Blanchfield, and has one brother, Brendan, who is also a mixed martial artist.

== Championships and accomplishments ==
=== Brazilian jiu-jitsu ===
- Eddie Bravo Invitational
  - Eddie Bravo Invitational Champion (One time)

=== Mixed martial arts ===
- Ultimate Fighting Championship
  - Performance of the Night (One time) vs. Jéssica Andrade
  - Fifth longest win streak in UFC Women's Flyweight division history (6)
  - Second most submissions in UFC Women's Flyweight division history (4) (behind Gillian Robertson)
  - Tied (Montana De La Rosa) for fourth most finishes in UFC Women's Flyweight division history (4)
  - UFC.com Awards
    - 2021: Ranked #5 Newcomer of the Year
    - 2023: Ranked #6 Submission of the Year vs. Jéssica Andrade
- Invicta Fighting Championships
  - Performance of the Night (Two times) vs. Victoria Leonardo, Brogan Walker-Sanchez
- Yahoo Sports
  - 2021 MMA Prospect of the Year
- MMA Fighting
  - 2022 Second Team MMA All-Star

== Mixed martial arts record ==
Professional record breakdown
17 matches	14 wins	3 losses
By knockout	2	0
By submission	5	0
By decision	7	3

Res.	Record	Opponent	Method	Event	Date	Round	Time	Location	Notes
Loss	14–3	Jasmine Jasudavicius	Decision (unanimous)	UFC Fight Night: Buckley vs. Malott	October 17, 2026	3	5:00	Edmonton, Alberta, Canada	
Win	14–2	Tracy Cortez	Submission (rear-naked choke)	UFC 322	November 15, 2025	2	4:44	New York City, New York, United States	
Win	13–2	Rose Namajunas	Decision (unanimous)	UFC Fight Night: Moreno vs. Albazi	November 2, 2024	5	5:00	Edmonton, Alberta, Canada	
Loss	12–2	Manon Fiorot	Decision (unanimous)	UFC on ESPN: Blanchfield vs. Fiorot	March 30, 2024	5	5:00	Atlantic City, New Jersey, United States	
Win	12–1	Taila Santos	Decision (unanimous)	UFC Fight Night: Holloway vs. The Korean Zombie	August 26, 2023	3	5:00	Kallang, Singapore	
Win	11–1	Jéssica Andrade	Submission (rear-naked choke)	UFC Fight Night: Andrade vs. Blanchfield	February 18, 2023	2	1:37	Las Vegas, Nevada, United States	Performance of the Night.
Win	10–1	Molly McCann	Submission (kimura)	UFC 281	November 12, 2022	1	3:37	New York City, New York, United States	
Win	9–1	JJ Aldrich	Submission (guillotine choke)	UFC Fight Night: Volkov vs. Rozenstruik	June 4, 2022	2	2:38	Las Vegas, Nevada, United States	
Win	8–1	Miranda Maverick	Decision (unanimous)	UFC 269	December 11, 2021	3	5:00	Las Vegas, Nevada, United States	
Win	7–1	Sarah Alpar	Decision (unanimous)	UFC Fight Night: Smith vs. Spann	September 18, 2021	3	5:00	Las Vegas, Nevada, United States	
Win	6–1	Brogan Walker-Sanchez	Decision (unanimous)	Invicta FC 41	July 30, 2020	3	5:00	Kansas City, Kansas, United States	Performance of the Night.
Win	5–1	Victoria Leonardo	KO (head kick and punches)	Invicta FC 39	February 7, 2020	2	2:06	Kansas City, Kansas, United States	Performance of the Night.
Win	4–1	Gabriella Gulfin	Submission (americana)	Cage Fury FC 76	June 14, 2019	1	3:20	Atlantic City, New Jersey, United States	
Loss	3–1	Tracy Cortez	Decision (split)	Invicta FC 34	February 15, 2019	3	5:00	Kansas City, Missouri, United States	
Win	3–0	Kay Hansen	Decision (majority)	Invicta FC 32	November 16, 2018	3	5:00	Kansas City, Missouri, United States	
Win	2–0	Brittney Cloudy	Decision (split)	Invicta FC 30	July 21, 2018	3	5:00	Kansas City, Missouri, United States	
Win	1–0	Whittany Pyles	TKO (doctor stoppage)	Cage Fury FC 70	March 24, 2018	1	5:00	Atlantic City, New Jersey, United States	Flyweight debut.

== See also ==
- List of current UFC fighters
- List of female mixed martial artists
