= John Brogan (footballer, born 1958) =

Scottish footballer

Personal information
- Full name: John Brogan
- Date of birth: 18 May 1958 (age 68)
- Place of birth: Glasgow, Scotland
- Position: Defender

Youth career
- Glasgow United

Senior career*
Years	Team	Apps	(Gls)
1976–1977	Partick Thistle	0	(0)
1977–1984	Clyde	178	(7)
Total		178	(7)
- * Club domestic league appearances and goals

John Brogan (born 18 May 1958) is a Scottish former footballer who played as a defender.

Brogan began his career with Partick Thistle. He did not play for the first team and moved to Clyde. He stayed with Clyde for seven seasons before dropping out of the senior game to join Glasgow Perthshire.

== Honours ==
- Scottish Second Division: 1977–78, 1981–82
