= UFC on ESPN: Covington vs. Buckley =

Mixed martial arts event in 2024

- The poster for UFC on ESPN: Covington vs. Buckley
- Promotion: Ultimate Fighting Championship
- Date: December 14, 2024
- Venue: Amalie Arena
- City: Tampa, Florida, United States
- Attendance: 18,625
- Total gate: $3,060,000

Event chronology
| UFC 310: Pantoja vs. Asakura | UFC on ESPN: Covington vs. Buckley | UFC Fight Night: Dern vs. Ribas 2 |

UFC on ESPN: Covington vs. Buckley (also known as UFC on ESPN 63) was a mixed martial arts event produced by the Ultimate Fighting Championship that took place on December 14, 2024, at the Amalie Arena in Tampa, Florida, United States.

== Background ==
The event marked the promotion's fourth visit to Tampa and first since UFC Fight Night: Joanna vs. Waterson in October 2019.

A welterweight bout between Joaquin Buckley and Ian Machado Garry was expected to headline the event. However, Garry was pulled to fight Shavkat Rakhmonov at UFC 310 a week earlier and was replaced by former interim UFC Welterweight Champion Colby Covington.

A bantamweight bout between Umar Nurmagomedov and Song Yadong was originally reported to headline the event. However, the bout never materialized due to Song being injured.

A women's flyweight bout between Tracy Cortez and Miranda Maverick was originally scheduled to take place at UFC on ESPN: Lemos vs. Jandiroba in July, but Cortez was pulled from the contest in order to serve as a replacement against former two-time UFC Women's Strawweight Champion Rose Namajunas a week earlier at UFC on ESPN: Namajunas vs. Cortez. They were then expected to meet at this event. However, Cortez was forced to withdraw due to health issues that required her to have surgery and was replaced by former LFA Women's Flyweight Champion Jamey-Lyn Horth.

A bantamweight bout between Said Nurmagomedov and Daniel Marcos was scheduled for this event. However, Nurmagomedov withdrew from the fight for unknown reasons and was replaced by Adrian Yañez.

A women's strawweight rematch between Mackenzie Dern and Amanda Ribas was scheduled for this event. The duo previously met at the promotion's last visit to Tampa, when Ribas won by unanimous decision. However, the bout was moved to January 11, 2025 to serve as the main event at UFC Fight Night: Dern vs. Ribas 2.

== Results ==
Main card (ESPN2 / ESPN+)
| Weight class | | | | Method | Round | Time | Notes |
|---|---|---|---|---|---|---|---|
| Welterweight | Joaquin Buckley | def. | Colby Covington | TKO (doctor stoppage) | 3 | 4:42 |
| Featherweight | Cub Swanson | def. | Billy Quarantillo | KO (punch) | 3 | 1:36 |
| Flyweight | Manel Kape | def. | Bruno Gustavo da Silva | TKO (body kick and punches) | 3 | 1:57 | (Note: Silva was deducted 1 point in round 2 due to a groin strike.) |
| Light Heavyweight | Dustin Jacoby | def. | Vitor Petrino | KO (punch) | 3 | 3:44 |
| Bantamweight | Daniel Marcos | def. | Adrian Yañez | Decision (split) (28–29, 30–27, 29–28) | 3 | 5:00 |
| Light Heavyweight | Navajo Stirling | def. | Tuco Tokkos | Decision (unanimous) (30–27, 30–27, 30–27) | 3 | 5:00 |
Preliminary card (ESPNews / ESPN+)
| Lightweight | Michael Johnson | def. | Ottman Azaitar | KO (punch) | 2 | 2:03 |
| Lightweight | Joel Álvarez | def. | Drakkar Klose | KO (flying knee and punches) | 1 | 2:48 |
| Featherweight | Sean Woodson | def. | Fernando Padilla | TKO (punches) | 1 | 4:58 |
| Featherweight | Felipe Lima | def. | Miles Johns | Decision (unanimous) (30–27, 30–27, 30–27) | 3 | 5:00 |
| Women's Flyweight | Miranda Maverick | def. | Jamey-Lyn Horth | Decision (unanimous) (29–28, 29–28, 29–28) | 3 | 5:00 |
| Bantamweight | Davey Grant | def. | Ramon Taveras | Decision (unanimous) (29–28, 30–27, 30–27) | 3 | 5:00 |
| Women's Strawweight | Piera Rodríguez | def. | Josefine Lindgren Knutsson | Decision (unanimous) (30–27, 30–27, 30–27) | 3 | 5:00 |

== Bonus awards ==
The following fighters received $50,000 bonuses.

- Fight of the Night: Cub Swanson vs. Billy Quarantillo
- Performance of the Night: Dustin Jacoby and Michael Johnson

== See also ==
- 2024 in UFC
- List of current UFC fighters
- List of UFC events
