= Maryna Moroz =

Ukrainian mixed martial artist

- Born: September 8, 1991 (age 35); Vilnohirsk, Ukraine
- Nickname: Iron Lady
- Height: 5 ft 7 in (1.70 m)
- Weight: 115 lb (52 kg; 8.2 st)
- Division: Flyweight (2013–2014, 2019–present); Strawweight (2014–2018)
- Reach: 67 in (170 cm)
- Fighting out of: Vilnohirsk, Ukraine
- Team: YK Promotion; American Top Team
- Rank: Master of Sports in Boxing; Master of Sports in Kickboxing
- Years active: 2013–present

Mixed martial arts record
- Total: 17
- Wins: 11
- By knockout: 1
- By submission: 6
- By decision: 4
- Losses: 6
- By submission: 1
- By decision: 5

Other information
- Website: marynamoroz.com
- Mixed martial arts record from Sherdog

Maryna Moroz (Ukrainian: Марина Мороз; born September 8, 1991) is a Ukrainian professional mixed martial artist. She competed in the women's Flyweight division of the Ultimate Fighting Championship (UFC). Moroz is also a boxing coach for the Ukrainian Olympic women's boxing team.

== Mixed martial arts career ==
=== Early career ===
Moroz started practicing boxing at a young age. She began training in mixed martial arts in 2013 as there was a lack of opportunity in professional women's boxing in Ukraine. She made her professional debut in 2013 and amassed a record of 5–0, before joining Xtreme Fighting Championships.

=== Xtreme Fighting Championships ===
After a 5–0 stint on the regional circuit, Moroz signed with Florida based promotion Xtreme Fighting Championships. Moroz faced Karine Silva in her debut at XFC International 7 on November 1, 2014. She won the fight via armbar submission in the first round.

=== Ultimate Fighting Championship ===
Moroz made her promotional debut in the Ultimate Fighting Championship (UFC) against Joanne Calderwood on April 11, 2015, at UFC Fight Night 64. Moroz won the fight via armbar submission in the first round. This win earned Moroz her first Performance of the Night bonus award.

Moroz next faced Valérie Létourneau on August 23, 2015, at UFC Fight Night 74. Moroz lost the back-and-forth fight via unanimous decision.

Moroz rebounded from her first career defeat with a decision win over Cristina Stanciu at UFC Fight Night: Rothwell vs. dos Santos on April 10, 2016.

Moroz defeated Danielle Taylor at UFC Fight Night: Rodríguez vs. Caceres via split decision on August 6, 2016.

On June 25, 2017, Moroz faced inaugural UFC women's strawweight champion Carla Esparza at UFC Fight Night: Chiesa vs. Lee. She lost the fight via unanimous decision.

Moroz was expected to face Jamie Moyle on January 20, 2018, at UFC 220. However, Moyle pulled out of the fight during the week leading up to the event, citing an undisclosed injury, and the bout was cancelled.

Moroz faced former Invicta FC champion Angela Hill on February 24, 2018, at UFC on Fox: Emmett vs. Stephens. She lost the fight by unanimous decision.

Moroz was expected to face Ariane Lipski on November 17, 2018, at UFC Fight Night 140. However, on October 29, 2018, it was reported that Moroz pulled out from the bout, due to an injury.

Moroz faced promotional newcomer Sabina Mazo in her flyweight debut on March 30, 2019, at UFC on ESPN 2. Moroz won the fight via unanimous decision.

Moroz was expected to face Poliana Botelho on August 17, 2019, at UFC 241. However, it was reported on August 1, 2019, that Moroz was forced to pull from the event, citing an injury.

Moroz faced Mayra Bueno Silva on March 14, 2020, at UFC Fight Night 170. Moroz won the fight via unanimous decision. This fight earned her the Fight of the Night award.

Moroz was scheduled to face Montana De La Rosa on September 5, 2020, at UFC Fight Night 176. However, Moroz was forced to withdraw from the event, due to visa issues, and she was replaced by Viviane Araújo.

Moroz was scheduled to face Taila Santos on December 5, 2020, at UFC on ESPN 19. However, on November 18, it was announced that Moroz had to pull out, and she was replaced by Montana De La Rosa.

Moroz was scheduled to face Manon Fiorot on June 5, 2021, at UFC Fight Night 189. However, Moroz was pulled from the event for undisclosed reasons, and she was replaced by Tabatha Ricci.

Moroz was scheduled to face Luana Carolina on October 16, 2021, at UFC Fight Night 195. However, at the end of September, Moroz pulled out of the bout for undisclosed reasons and was replaced by Sijara Eubanks.

Moroz faced Mariya Agapova on March 5, 2022, at UFC 272. She won the fight via a submission in round two. This win earned her the Performance of the Night award.

Moroz was scheduled to face Sijara Eubanks on July 9, 2022, at UFC Fight Night 209. However, the pair was moved to UFC Fight Night 210 on September 17, 2022, for undisclosed reasons. In early September, the bout was scrapped again for undisclosed reasons as Moroz was rebooked for a new bout.

Moroz was scheduled to face Jennifer Maia on September 17, 2022, at UFC Fight Night 214. However, the pair was moved to UFC Fight Night 215 on November 19, 2022, for undisclosed reasons. Moroz lost the fight via unanimous decision.

Moroz faced Karine Silva in a rematch on August 19, 2023, at UFC 292. She lost the fight via a guillotine choke submission in the first round.

Moroz faced Joanne Wood on March 9, 2024, at UFC 299 She lost the bout by split decision.

In early September 2025, Moroz was handed a 1-year suspension by Combat Sports Anti-Doping (CSAD), after she tested positive for the banned substance Meldonium in two separate tests during the summer. She is eligible to compete again on July 17, 2026.

On September 11, 2025, it was reported that Moroz was released by the UFC.

== Championships and accomplishments ==
=== Mixed martial arts ===
- Ultimate Fighting Championship
  - Fight of the Night (One time) vs. Mayra Bueno Silva
  - Performance of the Night (Two times) vs. Joanne Calderwood and Mariya Agapova
  - UFC.com Awards
    - 2015: Ranked #6 Upset of the Year vs. Joanne Calderwood

== Mixed martial arts record ==
Professional record breakdown
17 matches	11 wins	6 losses
By knockout	1	0
By submission	6	1
By decision	4	5

Res.	Record	Opponent	Method	Event	Date	Round	Time	Location	Notes
Loss	11–6	Joanne Wood	Decision (split)	UFC 299	March 9, 2024	3	5:00	Miami, Florida, United States	
Loss	11–5	Karine Silva	Submission (guillotine choke)	UFC 292	August 19, 2023	1	4:59	Boston, Massachusetts, United States	
Loss	11–4	Jennifer Maia	Decision (unanimous)	UFC Fight Night: Nzechukwu vs. Cuțelaba	November 19, 2022	3	5:00	Las Vegas, Nevada, United States	
Win	11–3	Mariya Agapova	Submission (arm-triangle choke)	UFC 272	March 5, 2022	2	3:27	Las Vegas, Nevada, United States	Performance of the Night.
Win	10–3	Mayra Bueno Silva	Decision (unanimous)	UFC Fight Night: Lee vs. Oliveira	March 14, 2020	3	5:00	Brasília, Brazil	Fight of the Night.
Win	9–3	Sabina Mazo	Decision (unanimous)	UFC on ESPN: Barboza vs. Gaethje	March 30, 2019	3	5:00	Philadelphia, Pennsylvania, United States	Return to Flyweight.
Loss	8–3	Angela Hill	Decision (unanimous)	UFC on Fox: Emmett vs. Stephens	February 24, 2018	3	5:00	Orlando, Florida, United States	
Loss	8–2	Carla Esparza	Decision (unanimous)	UFC Fight Night: Chiesa vs. Lee	June 25, 2017	3	5:00	Oklahoma City, Oklahoma, United States	
Win	8–1	Danielle Taylor	Decision (split)	UFC Fight Night: Rodríguez vs. Caceres	August 6, 2016	3	5:00	Salt Lake City, Utah, United States	
Win	7–1	Cristina Stanciu	Decision (unanimous)	UFC Fight Night: Rothwell vs. dos Santos	April 10, 2016	3	5:00	Zagreb, Croatia	
Loss	6–1	Valérie Létourneau	Decision (unanimous)	UFC Fight Night: Holloway vs. Oliveira	August 23, 2015	3	5:00	Saskatoon, Saskatchewan, Canada	
Win	6–0	Joanne Calderwood	Submission (armbar)	UFC Fight Night: Gonzaga vs. Cro Cop 2	April 11, 2015	1	1:30	Kraków, Poland	Performance of the Night.
Win	5–0	Karine Silva	Submission (armbar)	XFC International 7	November 1, 2014	1	3:27	São Paulo, Brazil	Strawweight debut. XFCI Women's Strawweight Tournament Quarterfinals.
Win	4–0	Ilona Avdeeva	TKO (doctor stoppage)	IMAT: Moroz vs. Avdeeva	September 7, 2014	1	1:15	Moscow, Russia	
Win	3–0	Jin Tang	Submission (straight armbar)	Kunlun Fight 8	August 24, 2014	1	3:50	Leshan, China	
Win	2–0	Feier Huang	Submission (armbar)	Kunlun Fight 5	June 1, 2014	1	2:52	Leshan, China	
Win	1–0	Yana Kuzioma	Submission (armbar)	Oplot Challenge 89	November 23, 2013	2	1:12	Kharkiv, Ukraine	
