= Lauren Mueller =

American mixed martial artist

- Born: November 15, 1991 (age 34); San Diego, California, U.S.
- Nickname: Princess Tiger
- Height: 5 ft 5 in (1.65 m)
- Weight: 125 lb (57 kg; 8 st 13 lb)
- Division: Bantamweight (2015–2017); Flyweight (2018–present)
- Reach: 67 in (170 cm)
- Fighting out of: Chula Vista, California, U.S.
- Team: Alliance MMA
- Years active: 2015–2021

Mixed martial arts record
- Total: 9
- Wins: 5
- By knockout: 1
- By decision: 4
- Losses: 4
- By submission: 1
- By decision: 3

Other information
- Mixed martial arts record from Sherdog

Lauren Mueller (born November 15, 1991) is an American former mixed martial artist, who fought in the Bantamweight division. A professional competitor from 2015 to 2021, she competed in the UFC, Invicta FC, and Gladiator Challenge.

== Background ==
Mueller did motocross, softball and volleyball among others growing up, eventually picking up mixed martial arts after high school. She stopped working as a full-time nurse to pursue a career in the sport.

== Mixed martial arts career ==
=== Early career ===
Lauren Mueller made her mixed martial arts debut in 2015, during Gladiator Challenge - Contenders, when she faced Peggy Ross. She won the fight by unanimous decision. Fighting with the same organization, she won another unanimous decision against Hannah Fitzpatrick and scored a TKO win over Faye Shields.

In 2017 she fought under Dana White's Contender Series at Dana White's Contender Series 8 against Kelly McGill-Velasco, and won a unanimous decision. This victory earned her a contract with the UFC.

=== Ultimate Fighting Championship ===
Mueller made her UFC debut as a replacement for Wu Yanan, fighting Shana Dobson at UFC on Fox: Poirier vs. Gaethje, on five weeks notice. Mueller won the fight through a unanimous decision.

She was then scheduled to fight against Wu Yanan during UFC Fight Night: Blaydes vs. Ngannou 2. Mueller suffered her first professional loss, losing by way of an armbar in the first round.

During UFC 236 she fought Poliana Botelho replacing injured Paige VanZant. She lost a unanimous decision.

During UFC Fight Night: Joanna vs. Waterson Mueller faced JJ Aldrich. She would lose a unanimous decision.

Mueller was released from UFC in December 2019.

=== Invicta Fighting Championships ===
Mueller faced Serena DeJesus at Invicta FC 44: A New Era on August 27, 2021. Mueller lost via split decision.

Mueller was scheduled to face Claire Guthrie on January 12, 2022 at Invicta FC 45. The bout was scratched for unknown reasons.

== Mixed martial arts record ==
Professional record breakdown
9 matches	5 wins	4 losses
By knockout	1	0
By submission	0	1
By decision	4	3

Res.	Record	Opponent	Method	Event	Date	Round	Time	Location	Notes
Loss	5–4	Serena DeJesus	Decision (split)	Invicta FC 44: A New Era	August 27, 2021	3	5:00	Kansas City, Kansas, United States	
Loss	5–3	JJ Aldrich	Decision (unanimous)	UFC Fight Night: Joanna vs. Waterson	October 12, 2019	3	5:00	Tampa, Florida, United States	
Loss	5–2	Poliana Botelho	Decision (unanimous)	UFC 236	April 13, 2019	3	5:00	Atlanta, Georgia, United States	
Loss	5–1	Wu Yanan	Submission (armbar)	UFC Fight Night: Blaydes vs. Ngannou 2	November 24, 2018	1	4:00	Beijing, China	
Win	5–0	Shana Dobson	Decision (unanimous)	UFC on Fox: Poirier vs. Gaethje	April 14, 2018	3	5:00	Glendale, Arizona, United States	Flyweight debut.
Win	4–0	Kelly McGill-Velasco	Decision (unanimous)	Dana White's Contender Series 8	August 29, 2017	3	5:00	Las Vegas, Nevada, United States	
Win	3–0	Hannah Fitzpatrick	Decision (unanimous)	Gladiator Challenge - Freedom Strikes	July 23, 2016	3	5:00	El Cajon, California, United States	
Win	2–0	Faye Shields	TKO (submission to punches)	Gladiator Challenge - MMA Smackdown	April 2, 2016	1	1:01	El Cajon, California, United States	
Win	1–0	Peggy Ross	Decision (unanimous)	Gladiator Challenge - Contenders	July 11, 2015	3	5:00	El Cajon, California, United States	Bantamweight debut.

== See also ==
- List of female mixed martial artists
