= Shana Dobson =

American mixed martial artist

- Born: Shoshana Renee Dobson; March 30, 1989 (age 37); Miami, Florida, United States
- Other names: Danger
- Height: 5 ft 6 in (1.68 m)
- Weight: 125 lb (57 kg; 8 st 13 lb)
- Division: Flyweight
- Reach: 69 in (175 cm)
- Fighting out of: Denver, Colorado, United States
- Team: Phalanx MMA (formerly); Team Lloyd Irvin (2018–2019); Elevation Fight Team (2019–present)
- Years active: 2016–2021

Mixed martial arts record
- Total: 9
- Wins: 4
- By knockout: 2
- By decision: 2
- Losses: 5
- By knockout: 2
- By decision: 3

Other information
- Mixed martial arts record from Sherdog

Shoshana Renee Dobson (born March 30, 1989) is a retired American mixed martial artist (MMA) who competed in the Flyweight division. She is most notable for her time in the Ultimate Fighting Championship (UFC).

== Personal life ==
Dobson is of Jamaican descent and is openly lesbian.

== Mixed martial arts career ==
=== Early career ===
Dobson started her professional MMA career since 2016 after amassed a record of 3–1, she participated in The Ultimate Fighter 26.

==== The Ultimate Fighter ====
In August 2017, it was announced that Dobson would be one of the fighters featured on The Ultimate Fighter 26, where the process to crown the UFC's inaugural 125-pound women's champion would take place.

Dobson, representing team Alvarez, faced Roxanne Modafferi and she lost by TKO due to punches in the first round.

=== Ultimate Fighting Championship ===
Dobson made her promotional debut on December 1, 2017 on The Ultimate Fighter 26 Finale against Ariel Beck. She won the fight via a technical knockout in round one.

Dobson next faced Lauren Mueller at UFC on Fox: Poirier vs. Gaethje on April 14, 2018. She lost the fight via unanimous decision.

Dobson faced Sabina Mazo on August 17, 2019 at UFC 241. She lost the fight via unanimous decision.

Dobson faced Priscila Cachoeira (replacing Rachael Ostovich) on February 23, 2020 at UFC Fight Night 168. Dobson lost the fight via knockout in the first round.

Dobson faced Mariya Agapova on August 22, 2020 at UFC on ESPN 15. She won the fight via TKO in the second round, securing the largest betting odds upset in UFC women's history (tied with Holly Holm's upset victory over Ronda Rousey at UFC 193). This win earned her the Performance of the Night award.

Dobson faced promotional newcomer Casey O'Neill on February 20, 2021 at UFC Fight Night 185. She lost the fight via technical knockout in round two.

On March 11, 2021, it was announced that Shana was released from the UFC.

On March 23, 2021, Dobson announced her retirement from MMA.

== Championships and accomplishments ==
=== Mixed martial arts ===
- Ultimate Fighting Championship
  - Performance of the Night (One time) vs. Mariya Agapova
  - UFC.com Awards
    - 2020: Ranked #2 Upset of the Year vs. Mariya Agapova
- MMA Mania
  - 2020 Upset of the Year vs. Mariya Agapova
- Combat Press
  - 2020 Upset of the Year vs. Mariya Agapova
- LowKick MMA
  - 2020 Upset of the Year vs. Mariya Agapova
- MMA Junkie
  - 2020 Upset of the Year vs. Mariya Agapova

== Mixed martial arts record ==
Professional record breakdown
9 matches	4 wins	5 losses
By knockout	2	2
By decision	2	3

Res.	Record	Opponent	Method	Event	Date	Round	Time	Location	Notes
Loss	4–5	Casey O'Neill	TKO (punches)	UFC Fight Night: Blaydes vs. Lewis	February 20, 2021	2	3:41	Las Vegas, Nevada, United States	
Win	4–4	Mariya Agapova	TKO (punches)	UFC on ESPN: Munhoz vs. Edgar	August 22, 2020	2	1:38	Las Vegas, Nevada, United States	Performance of the Night.
Loss	3–4	Priscila Cachoeira	KO (punch)	UFC Fight Night: Felder vs. Hooker	February 22, 2020	1	0:40	Auckland, New Zealand	
Loss	3–3	Sabina Mazo	Decision (unanimous)	UFC 241	August 17, 2019	3	5:00	Anaheim, California, United States	
Loss	3–2	Lauren Mueller	Decision (unanimous)	UFC on Fox: Poirier vs. Gaethje	April 14, 2018	3	5:00	Glendale, Arizona, United States	
Win	3–1	Ariel Beck	TKO (punches)	The Ultimate Fighter: A New World Champion Finale	December 1, 2017	2	2:53	Las Vegas, Nevada, United States	
Win	2–1	Rebecca Adney	Decision (unanimous)	Xtreme Knockout 35	April 1, 2017	3	3:00	Dallas, Texas, United States	
Loss	1–1	Nicco Montaño	Decision (unanimous)	KOTC: Will Power	August 13, 2016	3	5:00	Albuquerque, New Mexico, United States	
Win	1–0	Cassandra Spatz	Decision (unanimous)	Xtreme Knockout 30	April 30, 2016	3	3:00	Dallas, Texas, United States	Flyweight debut.

Exhibition record breakdown		
1 match	0 wins	1 loss
By knockout	0	1

Res.	Record	Opponent	Method	Event	Date	Round	Time	Location	Notes
Loss	0–1	Roxanne Modafferi	TKO (elbows)	The Ultimate Fighter: A New World Champion	August 30, 2017 (air date)	1	3:36	Las Vegas, Nevada, United States	TUF 26 preliminary round

Amateur record breakdown		
2 matches	2 wins	0 losses
By knockout	1	0
By submission	1	0

Res.	Record	Opponent	Method	Event	Date	Round	Time	Location	Notes
Win	2–0	Morgan Solis	TKO (strikes)	Sugar Creek Showdown 28	November 14, 2015	2	0:13	Hinton, Oklahoma, United States	
Win	1–0	Bella Wasserman	Submission (rear-naked choke)	Sugar Creek Showdown 24	January 24, 2015	1	2:24	Hinton, Oklahoma, United States	

== See also ==
- List of female mixed martial artists
