= Ľudovít Klein =

Slovak mixed martial arts fighter

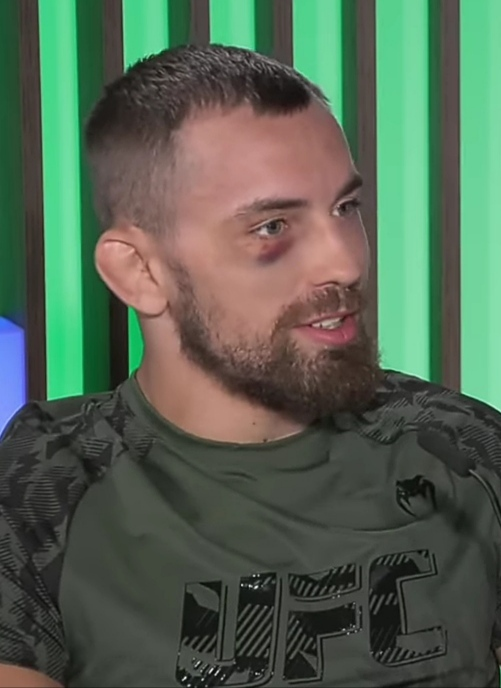
- Klein in 2022
- Born: February 22, 1995 (age 31); Nové Zámky, Slovakia
- Other names: Mr. Highlight
- Height: 5 ft 7 in (1.70 m)
- Weight: 155 lb (70 kg; 11 st 1 lb)
- Division: Lightweight; Featherweight
- Reach: 72.0 in (183 cm)
- Stance: Southpaw
- Fighting out of: Trnava, Slovakia
- Team: Spartakus Fight Gym
- Years active: 2014–present

Mixed martial arts record
- Total: 31
- Wins: 24
- By knockout: 9
- By submission: 8
- By decision: 7
- Losses: 6
- By knockout: 2
- By submission: 2
- By decision: 2
- Draws: 1

Other information
- Mixed martial arts record from Sherdog

Ľudovít Klein (born February 22, 1995) is a Slovak mixed martial artist who competes in the Lightweight division of the Ultimate Fighting Championship.

== Background ==
Ľudovít Klein was born in Nové Zámky, where he also started his sports career. When he was about 12 years old, Klein secretly signed up for boxing training as he feared his parents' reaction. After the first training sessions he was already aware that martial arts would accompany him throughout his life. Later, the boxing club he was involved in broke up and for some time he did not know which direction to take. As he wanted to continue his hobby, he signed up for Brazilian Jiu-Jitsu training. He trained for a long time in the Thomas Bilishich Martial Arts Academy. He later added Thai boxing to his martial arts training, which is how he first heard about the amateur MMA league. Subsequently, he started to devote himself to it.

In the beginning he earned his living as a bouncer at discos, where he was often picked on because of his shorter stature.

== Mixed martial arts career ==
=== Early career ===
Klein joined the professional MMA as a relatively experienced amateur. After a couple of performances on smaller Slovak shows, his potential was noticed by the Slovak MMA legend Attila Végh, who brought him to his gym based on his great performances. On the domestic scene, Lajoš went undefeated in his first six fights in smaller Slovak organizations, after which he decided to go abroad.

The first match outside Slovakia did not turn out as expected. Klein lost to Igor Tarytsa at A-Fight 5 via KO. He won 2 matches in the ACB, and managed to finish both in the second round. He returned to Slovakia for one match against Moric Besztercei, which he left as the winner.

He came to the British Cage Warriors as a favorite, but he fell short, losing to Aiden Lee . He finished Lajoš in the first round via submission and Klein decided to return home to Slovakia.

With a record of 9–2, Klein transferred to Oktagon MMA. In it he fought two times, giving dominant performances and winning both fights before the limit. In the second match against Matěj Kuzník, he headlined Oktagon 5.

Subsequently, he appeared for 2 matches in the competing XFN. In both, he won the bouts comfortably, but decided to return to the Oktagon due to problems in the organization.

In the Oktagon 12 tournament, he defeated the Brazilian William Lima in the first round, followed by wins against João Paulo Rodrigues at Oktagon 14 and Łukasz Sajewski at Oktagon Prime 3, ending both subsequent matches with his signature head kick.

=== Ultimate Fighting Championship ===
Klein, as a replacement for Nate Landwehr, faced Shane Young on 27 September 2020 at UFC 253. At the weigh-ins, Klein weighed in at 150 pounds, four pounds over the non-title featherweight fight limit. The bout proceeded at a catchweight and Klein was fined a percentage of his purse, which went to Young. Klein won the fight via knockout in round one.

Klein faced Michael Trizano on May 8, 2021, at UFC on ESPN 24. He lost the fight via unanimous decision. 11 out of 14 media scores gave the fight to Klein.

Klein faced Nate Landwehr on October 16, 2021, at UFC Fight Night 195. He lost the fight in the third round via a submission due to an anaconda choke.

Klein faced Devonte Smith, replacing injured Erick Gonzalez, on March 5, 2022, at UFC 272. He won the fight via split decision.

Klein was scheduled to face Ignacio Bahamondes on August 30, 2022, at UFC 277. However, Bahamondes pulled out on July 15, 2022, and Klein was rebooked against Mason Jones a week earlier at UFC Fight Night: Blaydes vs. Aspinall. He won the fight via unanimous decision.

Klein faced Jai Herbert on March 18, 2023, at UFC 286. The fight ended in a majority draw.

Klein was scheduled to face Jim Miller on June 3, 2023, at UFC on ESPN 46. However, Klein pulled out on May 19 due to illness and was replaced by Jared Gordon.

Klein was rescheduled to face Ignacio Bahamondes on August 5, 2023, at UFC Fight Night 226. He won the fight via unanimous decision.

Klein was scheduled to face Joel Álvarez on March 2, 2024, at UFC Fight Night 238. However, Álvarez was replaced by AJ Cunningham for unknown reasons. Klein won by technical knockout as a result of a body kick and follow-up punches at the end of the first round.

Klein faced Thiago Moisés on June 8, 2024, at UFC on ESPN 57. He won the fight by unanimous decision.

Klein was scheduled to face Nikolas Motta on September 28, 2024, at UFC Fight Night 243. However, Motta withdrew from the bout for unknown reasons and was replaced with Roosevelt Roberts. Klein won the fight by unanimous decision.

Klein was scheduled to face Mateusz Gamrot on May 31, 2025, at UFC on ESPN 68. He lost the fight by unanimous decision.

Klein faced Mateusz Rębecki on October 26, 2025, at UFC 321. He won the fight by majority decision. This fight earned him his first Fight of the Night award.

Klein faced Tofiq Musayev on August 1, 2026 at UFC Fight Night 283. He lost the fight by technical knockout in the second round.

== Championships and accomplishments ==
=== Mixed martial arts ===
- Ultimate Fighting Championship
  - Fight of the Night (One time) vs. Mateusz Rębecki

== Mixed martial arts record ==
Professional record breakdown
31 matches	24 wins	6 losses
By knockout	9	2
By submission	8	2
By decision	7	2
Draws	1	

Res.	Record	Opponent	Method	Event	Date	Round	Time	Location	Notes
Loss	24–6–1	Tofiq Musayev	TKO (punches)	UFC Fight Night: Medić vs. Rodriguez	August 1, 2026	2	4:07	Belgrade, Serbia	
Win	24–5–1	Mateusz Rębecki	Decision (majority)	UFC 321	October 25, 2025	3	5:00	Abu Dhabi, United Arab Emirates	Fight of the Night.
Loss	23–5–1	Mateusz Gamrot	Decision (unanimous)	UFC on ESPN: Gamrot vs. Klein	May 31, 2025	3	5:00	Las Vegas, Nevada, United States	
Win	23–4–1	Roosevelt Roberts	Decision (unanimous)	UFC Fight Night: Moicano vs. Saint Denis	September 28, 2024	3	5:00	Paris, France	
Win	22–4–1	Thiago Moisés	Decision (unanimous)	UFC on ESPN: Cannonier vs. Imavov	June 8, 2024	3	5:00	Louisville, Kentucky, United States	
Win	21–4–1	AJ Cunningham	TKO (front kick to the body and punches)	UFC Fight Night: Rozenstruik vs. Gaziev	March 2, 2024	1	4:36	Las Vegas, Nevada, United States	
Win	20–4–1	Ignacio Bahamondes	Decision (unanimous)	UFC on ESPN: Sandhagen vs. Font	August 5, 2023	3	5:00	Nashville, Tennessee, United States	
Draw	19–4–1	Jai Herbert	Draw (majority)	UFC 286	March 18, 2023	3	5:00	London, England	Herbert was deducted one point in round 3 due to multiple groin strikes.
Win	19–4	Mason Jones	Decision (unanimous)	UFC Fight Night: Blaydes vs. Aspinall	July 23, 2022	3	5:00	London, England	
Win	18–4	Devonte Smith	Decision (split)	UFC 272	March 5, 2022	3	5:00	Las Vegas, Nevada, United States	Return to Lightweight.
Loss	17–4	Nate Landwehr	Submission (anaconda choke)	UFC Fight Night: Ladd vs. Dumont	October 16, 2021	3	2:22	Las Vegas, Nevada, United States	
Loss	17–3	Michael Trizano	Decision (unanimous)	UFC on ESPN: Rodriguez vs. Waterson	May 8, 2021	3	5:00	Las Vegas, Nevada, United States	
Win	17–2	Shane Young	KO (head kick and punches)	UFC 253	September 27, 2020	1	1:16	Abu Dhabi, United Arab Emirates	Catchweight (150 lb) bout; Klein missed weight.
Win	16–2	Łukasz Sajewski	TKO (punches)	Oktagon Prime 3	February 15, 2020	1	3:49	Šamorín, Slovakia	
Win	15–2	João Paulo Rodrigues	KO (head kick)	Oktagon 14	September 14, 2019	3	0:46	Bratislava, Slovakia	
Win	14–2	Willian Lima	TKO (punches)	Oktagon 12	June 8, 2019	1	2:27	Bratislava, Slovakia	Lightweight bout.
Win	13–2	Arbi Mezhidov	Decision (unanimous)	X Fight Nights 14	November 18, 2018	3	5:00	Bratislava, Slovakia	
Win	12–2	Kamil Selwa	TKO (punches)	X Fight Nights 11	June 28, 2018	2	N/A	Prague, Czech Republic	Return to Featherweight.
Win	11–2	Matěj Kuzník	TKO (doctor stoppage)	Oktagon 5	March 17, 2018	4	5:00	Ostrava, Czech Republic	Lightweight debut.
Win	10–2	Krzysztof Klaczek	KO (head kick)	Oktagon 4	November 12, 2017	1	2:00	Bratislava, Slovakia	
Loss	9–2	Aiden Lee	Submission (rear-naked choke)	Cage Warriors 87	October 14, 2017	1	2:34	Newport, Wales	
Win	9–1	Moric Besztercei	Submission (rear-naked choke)	Dark Night Volume 2	June 24, 2017	1	4:56	Nové Zámky, Slovakia	
Win	8–1	Ahmed Abdulkadirov	Submission (guillotine choke)	ACB 60	May 13, 2017	2	0:44	Vienna, Austria	
Win	7–1	Khusein Maltsagov	KO (knee)	ACB 56	April 1, 2017	2	3:29	Minsk, Belarus	
Loss	6–1	Igor Tarytsa	KO (punch)	A-Fight 5	February 24, 2017	1	4:58	Nevinnomyssk, Russia	
Win	6–0	Aleksandar Janković	Submission (armbar)	Fight of Gladiators 5	April 9, 2016	1	N/A	Nitra, Slovakia	
Win	5–0	Michal Stefek	Submission (guillotine choke)	Hanuman Cup 30	March 5, 2016	1	0:40	Bratislava, Slovakia	
Win	4–0	Samuel Ribansky	Submission (armbar)	Hanuman Cup 28	September 26, 2015	2	0:00	Bratislava, Slovakia	
Win	3–0	Adam Németh	Submission (guillotine choke)	Hanuman Cup 27	July 4, 2015	1	1:00	Senec, Slovakia	
Win	2–0	Kamil Tarnawski	Submission (triangle choke)	Pit Cage Fighting 12	May 16, 2015	2	1:35	Poprad, Slovakia	
Win	1–0	Martin Mihálik	Submission (rear-naked choke)	Pit Cage Fighting 11	December 20, 2014	1	0:27	Levoča, Slovakia	Featherweight debut.

== See also ==
- List of current UFC fighters
- List of male mixed martial artists
