= Shannon Sinn =

American mixed martial arts fighter

- Born: Shannon Culpepper; November 28, 1990 (age 35)
- Nationality: American
- Height: 5 ft 8 in (1.73 m)
- Weight: 115 lb (52 kg; 8.2 st)
- Division: Flyweight (MMA)
- Reach: 68.0 in (173 cm)

Professional boxing record
- Total: 2
- Wins: 1
- Draws: 1

Kickboxing record
- Total: 1
- Wins: 1

Mixed martial arts record
- Total: 14
- Wins: 6
- By knockout: 1
- By submission: 1
- By decision: 4
- Losses: 8
- By submission: 2
- By decision: 6

Other information
- Boxing record from BoxRec
- Mixed martial arts record from Sherdog

Shannon Culpepper, known professionally as Shannon Sinn, is an American mixed martial artist who competes at Invicta FC in the Flyweight division and has fought 3 times for the organization.

== Mixed martial arts record ==
Professional record breakdown
13 matches	5 wins	8 losses
By knockout	1	0
By submission	1	2
By decision	3	6

Res.	Record	Opponent	Method	Event	Date	Round	Time	Location	Notes
Loss	5–8	Kaytlin Neil	Decision (unanimous)	SFN March Madness	March 22, 2019	5	5:00	Salt Lake City, Utah, United States	For the SFN Flyweight Championship.
Loss	5–7	Cheri Muraski	Decision (unanimous)	SCL Queen of Sparta: Flyweight	December 1, 2018	3	5:00	Denver, Colorado, United States	
Loss	5–6	Sabina Mazo	Decision (unanimous)	LFA 37	April 20, 2018	5	5:00	Sioux Falls, South Dakota, United States	For the vacant LFA Women's Flyweight Championship.
Win	5–5	Heather Bassett	TKO (punches)	SCL 64: Awakening	January 27, 2018	1	2:50	Denver, Colorado, United States	
Win	4–5	Katy Collins	Decision (unanimous)	LFA 21	September 1, 2017	3	5:00	Branson, Missouri, United States	
Loss	3–5	Cheri Muraski	Submission	SCL AVM 8	April 22, 2017	2	3:58	Loveland, Colorado, United States	
Win	3–4	Ashley Deen	Decision (split)	SCL 57: Dynamite	January 28, 2017	3	5:00	Denver, Colorado, United States	
Loss	2–4	Jenny Liou Shriver	Submission (armbar)	SCL 49: Revenge	June 25, 2016	3	2:53	Denver, Colorado, United States	
Loss	2–3	Christine Stanley	Decision (unanimous)	Invicta FC 17: Evinger vs. Schneider	May 7, 2016	3	5:00	Costa Mesa, California, United States	
Win	2–2	Maureen Riordon	Decision (unanimous)	Invicta FC 12: Kankaanpää vs. Souza	April 24, 2015	3	5:00	Kansas City, Missouri, United States	
Loss	1–2	Andrea Lee	Decision (unanimous)	Invicta FC 9: Honchak vs. Hashi	November 1, 2014	3	5:00	Davenport, Iowa, United States	
Loss	1–1	Alice Smith Yauger	Decision (unanimous)	SCL Heat	July 18, 2014	3	5:00	Castle Rock, Colorado, United States	
Win	1–0	Courtney Himes	Submission (armbar)	SCL Army vs. Marines 5	April 26, 2014	1	0:51	Loveland, Colorado, United States	
