= Tracy Cortez =

American mixed martial artist (born 1993)

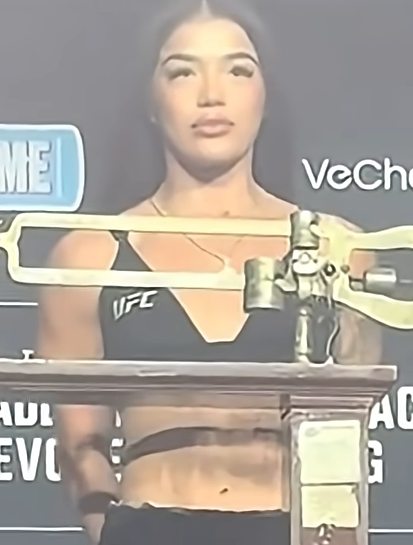
- Cortez at Noche UFC 1 weigh-in in 2023
- Born: Tracy R. Cortez; December 10, 1993 (age 32); Phoenix, Arizona, U.S.
- Height: 5 ft 5 in (1.65 m)
- Division: Flyweight
- Reach: 65 in (165 cm)
- Fighting out of: Mexico City, Mexico
- Team: Fight Ready MMA; Neuro Force One
- Trainer: Santino Defranco
- Rank: 8
- Years active: 2017–present

Mixed martial arts record
- Total: 16
- Wins: 12
- By knockout: 1
- By submission: 1
- By decision: 10
- Losses: 4
- By submission: 2
- By decision: 2

Other information
- Mixed martial arts record from Sherdog

Tracy R. Cortez (born December 10, 1993) is an American professional mixed martial artist who currently competes in the women's Flyweight division of the Ultimate Fighting Championship (UFC). As of July 11, 2026, she is #10 in the Meta UFC women's flyweight rankings.

== Background ==
Cortez is of Mexican descent, she was born on December 10, 1993 in Phoenix, Arizona, United States, and grew up in a household of Mexican immigrants. She has three brothers, Jose Cortez, J.R. Cortez and Abraham Cortez. At the age of 14, she started training MMA after she watched her first MMA match where her oldest brother Jose, who had aspired to be a UFC fighter, fought and won against former UFC veteran Drew Fickett in November 2008. Jose stopped competing after the match with Fickett when he underwent cardiovascular problems and was later diagnosed with germ cell cancer. He died from the disease in 2011. Cortez got a tattoo in remembrance of her brother on her arm. She struggled with depression following her brother's passing but managed to get back on track with the help of her family, Henry Cejudo, and Angel Cejudo, who were best friends of her brother Jose.

Every time I feel tired or I feel fatigued or I question anything, I think like, damn, my brother fought with cancer in his heart and he didn't give up. He fought through it. I'm perfectly healthy. I'm more than capable to do what I'm doing. This is easy work. That's a huge motivator for me.

== Mixed martial arts career ==
=== Early career ===
Cortez fought under World Fighting Federation and KOTC in her amateur career and amassed a record of 3–0 prior to being signed by Invicta Fighting Championships.

=== Invicta Fighting Championships and other promotions ===
Cortez made her Invicta debut on August 31, 2017, against Cheri Muraski at Invicta FC 25: Kunitskaya vs. Pa'aluhi. She lost the fight via submission in round two. She returned to World Fighting in November 2017, fought against Roxanne Ceasear and secured a win via unanimous decision.

Her next fight came on March 24, 2018, facing Kaytlin Neil at Invicta FC 28: Mizuki vs. Jandiroba. She won the fight via unanimous decision. Cortez went on to face Monica Median and Karen Cedillo in 2018 at V3 Fight Night 69 and Combate Americas: Alday vs. Lopez respectively and she won both of the fights.

On February 15, 2019, Cortez faced Erin Blanchfield at Invicta FC 34: Porto vs. Gonzalez. She won the fight via split decision.

=== Dana White's Tuesday Night Contender Series ===
Cortez appeared in DWTNCS: Season 3, Episode 6 web-series program on July 30, 2019, facing Mariya Agapova. She won the fight via unanimous decision and was signed by UFC.

=== Ultimate Fighting Championship ===
Cortez was expected to make her promotional debut against Duda Santana in a bantamweight bout on November 16, 2019, at UFC Fight Night 164. However, in October 27, it was reported that Santana was forced to withdraw from the fight due to family issues and she was replaced by Vanessa Melo. At the weigh-ins, Cortez and Melo both missed weight for their fight, both weighing in at 136.5 pounds, 0.5 pounds over the bantamweight non-title fight limit of 136. The bout was initially proceeded at a catchweight and no fine was issued due to identical misses. However, later on the same day, Brazil's athletic commission (CABMMA) executive director Cristiano Sampaio announced that due to an error of the scale used at the weight-ins was set was 0.7 pounds above the official scale and thus both fighters were officially clear from missing weight and the bout proceeded at bantamweight. Cortez won the bout by unanimous decision.

Cortez was expected to face Bea Malecki on October 11, 2020 at UFC Fight Night 179. However, on October 2, 2020, it was announced that Malecki was replaced by a newcomer Stephanie Egger for undisclosed reason. Cortez won the fight via unanimous decision.

Cortez faced Justine Kish on April 17, 2021, at UFC on ESPN 22. At the weigh-ins, Cortez came in at 126.5 pounds, a half pound over the flyweight non-title fight limit. Her bout proceeded at catchweight and she was fined 20% of her individual purse, which went to her opponent Kish. Cortez won the fight via a split decision.

Cortez was scheduled to face JJ Aldrich on August 28, 2021, at UFC on ESPN 30. However, Cortez was pulled from the fight due to injury, and she was replaced by Vanessa Demopoulos.

Cortez faced Melissa Gatto on May 7, 2022, at UFC 274. She won the fight via unanimous decision.

Cortez was scheduled to face Amanda Ribas on December 3, 2022, at UFC on ESPN 42. However, shortly after the official weigh-ins, the promotion announced Cortez was pulled from the bout due to an unspecified medical issue and the bout was cancelled.

Cortez faced Jasmine Jasudavicius on September 16, 2023, at UFC Fight Night 227. She won the fight via unanimous decision.

Cortez was scheduled to face Miranda Maverick on July 20, 2024, at UFC on ESPN 60. However, Cortez was pulled from the bout to face Rose Namajunas as a replacement for Maycee Barber, on July 13, 2024 at UFC on ESPN 59. She lost the fight by unanimous decision.

Cortez was re-scheduled to face Miranda Maverick on December 14, 2024 at UFC on ESPN 63. However, Cortez was forced to withdraw due to health issues that required her to have surgery and was replaced by Jamey-Lyn Horth.

Cortez faced Viviane Araújo on June 28, 2025, at UFC 317. She won the fight by unanimous decision.

Cortez faced Erin Blanchfield in a rematch on November 15, 2025 at UFC 322. She lost the fight via a rear-naked choke submission in the second round.

Cortez faced Wang Cong on July 11, 2026 at UFC 329. Despite having a point deducted from Cong for an illegal knee in the second round, Cortez lost the fight by unanimous decision.

== Personal life ==
Cortez was previously engaged to fellow UFC fighter Brian Ortega.

In January 2026, media outlets reported that she was in a relationship with the former UFC light heavyweight champion Alex Pereira following an Instagram post of the two kissing. The two would then end their relationship a week later for undisclosed reasons.

== Mixed martial arts record ==
Professional record breakdown
16 matches	12 wins	4 losses
By knockout	1	0
By submission	1	2
By decision	10	2

Res.	Record	Opponent	Method	Event	Date	Round	Time	Location	Notes
Loss	12–4	Wang Cong	Decision (unanimous)	UFC 329	July 11, 2026	3	5:00	Las Vegas, Nevada, United States	Wang was deducted one point in round 2 due to an illegal knee to a grounded opponent.
Loss	12–3	Erin Blanchfield	Submission (rear-naked choke)	UFC 322	November 15, 2025	2	4:44	New York City, New York, United States	
Win	12–2	Viviane Araújo	Decision (unanimous)	UFC 317	June 28, 2025	3	5:00	Las Vegas, Nevada, United States	
Loss	11–2	Rose Namajunas	Decision (unanimous)	UFC on ESPN: Namajunas vs. Cortez	July 13, 2024	5	5:00	Denver, Colorado, United States	
Win	11–1	Jasmine Jasudavicius	Decision (unanimous)	UFC Fight Night: Grasso vs. Shevchenko 2	September 16, 2023	3	5:00	Las Vegas, Nevada, United States	
Win	10–1	Melissa Gatto	Decision (unanimous)	UFC 274	May 7, 2022	3	5:00	Phoenix, Arizona, United States	
Win	9–1	Justine Kish	Decision (split)	UFC on ESPN: Whittaker vs. Gastelum	April 17, 2021	3	5:00	Las Vegas, Nevada, United States	Return to Flyweight; Cortez missed weight (126.5 lb).
Win	8–1	Stephanie Egger	Decision (unanimous)	UFC Fight Night: Moraes vs. Sandhagen	October 11, 2020	3	5:00	Abu Dhabi, United Arab Emirates	
Win	7–1	Vanessa Melo	Decision (unanimous)	UFC Fight Night: Błachowicz vs. Jacaré	November 16, 2019	3	5:00	São Paulo, Brazil	Bantamweight debut.
Win	6–1	Mariya Agapova	Decision (unanimous)	Dana White's Contender Series 22	July 30, 2019	3	5:00	Las Vegas, Nevada, United States	
Win	5–1	Erin Blanchfield	Decision (split)	Invicta FC 34	February 15, 2019	3	5:00	Kansas City, Missouri, United States	
Win	4–1	Karen Cedillo	TKO (punches)	Combate 24	September 14, 2018	2	3:53	Phoenix, Arizona, United States	
Win	3–1	Monica Medina	Submission (rear-naked choke)	V3 Fights 69	June 16, 2018	1	4:27	Memphis, Tennessee, United States	
Win	2–1	Kaytlin Neil	Decision (unanimous)	Invicta FC 28	March 24, 2018	3	5:00	Salt Lake City, Utah, United States	
Win	1–1	Roxanne Ceasear	Decision (unanimous)	World Fighting Federation 36	November 4, 2017	3	5:00	Chandler, Arizona, United States	
Loss	0–1	Cheri Muraski	Submission (guillotine choke)	Invicta FC 25	August 31, 2017	2	2:42	Lemoore, California, United States	Flyweight debut.

== See also ==
- List of Dana White's Contender Series alumni
- List of current UFC fighters
- List of female mixed martial artists
