= UFC on ESPN: Munhoz vs. Edgar =

UFC mixed martial arts event in 2020

- The poster for UFC on ESPN: Munhoz vs. Edgar
- Promotion: Ultimate Fighting Championship
- Date: August 22, 2020
- Venue: UFC Apex
- City: Enterprise, Nevada, United States
- Attendance: None (behind closed doors)

Event chronology
UFC 252: Miocic vs. Cormier 3	UFC on ESPN: Munhoz vs. Edgar	UFC Fight Night: Smith vs. Rakić

UFC on ESPN: Munhoz vs. Edgar (also known as UFC on ESPN 15 and UFC Vegas 7) was a mixed martial arts event produced by the Ultimate Fighting Championship that took place on August 22, 2020, at the UFC Apex facility in Enterprise, Nevada, part of the Las Vegas Metropolitan Area, United States.

== Background ==
A bantamweight bout between Pedro Munhoz and former UFC Lightweight Champion Frankie Edgar served as the event headliner. The matchup was briefly scheduled to take place at UFC 251, but it was then moved four days later to bolster UFC on ESPN: Kattar vs. Ige. On July 6, it was announced that the bout was scrapped after Munhoz tested positive for COVID-19. The pairing remained intact nonetheless and was rescheduled for UFC 252. However, the promotion decided to move the contest one final time.

Promotion officials had initially targeted a welterweight bout between former UFC Welterweight Champion Tyron Woodley and former interim champion Colby Covington to serve as the event headliner, but Woodley announced that the date did not provide him with time suitable enough to prepare because of injuries incurred during his most recent fight.

A light heavyweight bout between former interim UFC Light Heavyweight Championship challenger Ovince Saint Preux and Shamil Gamzatov was initially scheduled for April 25, but Gamzatov was forced to pull out of the event due to travel restrictions related to the COVID-19 pandemic. The pairing was rescheduled for this event. However, Gamzatov pulled out of the bout on August 13 due to undisclosed reasons and was replaced by Alonzo Menifield. Just hours before the event was scheduled to begin, it was announced that the bout was cancelled due to Saint Preux testing positive for COVID-19. The bout was then targeted for September 5 at UFC Fight Night: Overeem vs. Sakai.

Former UFC Middleweight Championship challenger (as well as 2000 Olympic silver medalist and former world champion in freestyle wrestling) Yoel Romero was scheduled to face Uriah Hall at the event, but pulled out of the fight on August 11 for undisclosed reasons. The pairing was then expected to be rescheduled for a future event.

Philip Rowe was briefly linked to a bout with promotional newcomer Matthew Semelsberger at the event. However, Rowe pulled out of the bout citing a toe injury. Semelsberger faced fellow newcomer Carlton Minus.

A women's strawweight bout between former Invicta FC Strawweight Champion Angela Hill and former Invicta FC Atomweight Champion Michelle Waterson was scheduled for the event. However, due to undisclosed personal reasons for Waterson, the bout was rescheduled for September 12 and ultimately served as the main event of UFC Fight Night: Waterson vs. Hill.

A light heavyweight bout between Jorge Gonzalez and Ike Villanueva was expected to take a week earlier at UFC 252. However, due to alleged visa issues for Gonzalez, the pairing was rescheduled for this event. In turn, Gonzalez was removed from the card for undisclosed reasons and replaced by promotional newcomer Jordan Wright.

Promotional newcomer Jared Gooden was scheduled to face Dwight Grant in a welterweight bout at the event, but pulled out of the fight during the week leading up to the event with an undisclosed injury. In turn, promotional newcomer Calen Born was announced as the replacement. However, Born pulled out of the fight on the day of the weigh-ins due to undisclosed personal issues. Meanwhile, another welterweight bout between Takashi Sato and Daniel Rodriguez was scrapped after the weigh-ins. Despite making the required weight, Sato was not cleared to fight by Nevada State Athletic Commission (NSAC) medical personnel and Rodriguez faced Grant instead.

A middleweight bout between Maki Pitolo and promotional newcomer Impa Kasanganay was briefly linked to the event. However, promotion officials elected to move the pairing a week later to UFC Fight Night: Smith vs. Rakić for undisclosed reasons.

Promotional newcomer Mark Striegl was expected to face fellow newcomer Timur Valiev at the event. However, Striegl was removed from the fight on August 20 after testing positive for COVID-19 and replaced by Trevin Jones. The bout was contested at a catchweight of 140 pounds.

== Results ==
Main card (ESPN / ESPN+)
Weight class				Method	Round	Time	Notes
Bantamweight	Frankie Edgar	def.	Pedro Munhoz	Decision (split) (48–47, 46–49, 48–47)	5	5:00
Light Heavyweight	Mike Rodríguez	def.	Marcin Prachnio	KO (elbow and punches)	1	2:17
Lightweight	Joe Solecki	def.	Austin Hubbard	Submission (rear-naked choke)	1	3:51
Women's Flyweight	Shana Dobson	def.	Mariya Agapova	TKO (punches)	2	1:38
Welterweight	Daniel Rodriguez	def.	Dwight Grant	KO (punches)	1	2:24
Preliminary Card (ESPN+)
Women's Strawweight	Amanda Lemos	def.	Mizuki Inoue	Decision (unanimous) (30–27, 30–27, 30–27)	3	5:00
Light Heavyweight	Jordan Wright	def.	Ike Villanueva	TKO (doctor stoppage)	1	1:31
Welterweight	Matthew Semelsberger	def.	Carlton Minus	Decision (unanimous) (30–26, 30–27, 29–28)	3	5:00
Catchweight (140 lb)	Trevin Jones	vs.	Timur Valiev	No Contest (overturned)	2	1:59	(Note: Originally a TKO (punches) win for Jones; overturned after he tested positive for marijuana.)

== Bonus awards ==
The following fighters received $50,000 bonuses.

- Fight of the Night: Frankie Edgar vs. Pedro Munhoz
- Performance of the Night: Shana Dobson and Trevin Jones

== Aftermath ==
On October 7, it was announced that the NSAC issued a four and a half month suspension for Trevin Jones, after he tested positive for marijuana in a drug test related to his fight. They also announced that Jones' victory was overturned to a no contest due to the violation. He was fined $1,800 and before he is relicensed in Las Vegas, Jones will also have to pay a prosecution fee of $145.36.

== See also ==
- List of UFC events
- List of current UFC fighters
- 2020 in UFC
