= UFC 241 =

UFC mixed martial arts event in 2019

UFC 241: Cormier vs. Miocic 2
- The poster for UFC 241: Cormier vs. Miocic 2
- Promotion: Ultimate Fighting Championship
- Date: August 17, 2019
- Venue: Honda Center
- City: Anaheim, California
- Attendance: 17,304
- Total gate: $3,237,032

Event chronology
UFC Fight Night: Shevchenko vs. Carmouche 2	UFC 241: Cormier vs. Miocic 2	UFC Fight Night: Andrade vs. Zhang

UFC 241: Cormier vs. Miocic 2 was a mixed martial arts event produced by the Ultimate Fighting Championship that took place on August 17, 2019, at the Honda Center in Anaheim, California.

== Background ==
A UFC Heavyweight Championship rematch between current champion Daniel Cormier and former champion Stipe Miocic served as the event's headliner. The pairing met previously at UFC 226 on July 7, 2018, when then UFC Light Heavyweight Champion Cormier knocked out Miocic in the first round to capture the heavyweight title.

A middleweight bout between former interim UFC Middleweight Championship challenger (as well as 2000 Olympic silver medalist and former world champion in freestyle wrestling) Yoel Romero and Paulo Costa was rescheduled for this event. The pairing was previously scheduled to take place at UFC 230, at UFC Fight Night: Cejudo vs. Dillashaw and again at UFC Fight Night: Jacaré vs. Hermansson but was scrapped each time for various reasons.

A lightweight bout was scheduled between John Makdessi and Devonte Smith for the event. However, it was reported on July 30 that Makdessi was forced to withdraw for undisclosed reasons. Returning veteran Clay Collard was briefly linked as the replacement. In turn, Collard was removed from the bout during the week leading up to the event due to an undisclosed medical issue. Smith instead fought promotional newcomer Khama Worthy.

A flyweight bout was scheduled between Maryna Moroz and Poliana Botelho for the event. However, it was reported on August 1 that Moroz was forced to pull from the event citing injury. In early August, Botelho announced via social media that she was no longer participating in the event.

Manny Bermudez and Casey Kenney were originally scheduled to fight at bantamweight. However, the UFC decided to move the bout to a catchweight bout of 140 lb due to Bermudez not being able to safely cut weight the night before weigh-ins. According to Kenney, he received a part of Bermudez's purse despite him not technically missing weight.

== Results ==
Main Card
Weight class				Method	Round	Time	Notes
Heavyweight	Stipe Miocic	def.	Daniel Cormier (c)	TKO (punches)	4	4:09	(Note: For the UFC Heavyweight Championship)
Welterweight	Nate Diaz	def.	Anthony Pettis	Decision (unanimous) (30–27, 30–27, 29–28)	3	5:00
Middleweight	Paulo Costa	def.	Yoel Romero	Decision (unanimous) (29–28, 29–28, 29–28)	3	5:00
Featherweight	Sodiq Yusuff	def.	Gabriel Benítez	TKO (punches)	1	4:14
Middleweight	Derek Brunson	def.	Ian Heinisch	Decision (unanimous) (29–28, 29–28, 29–28)	3	5:00
Preliminary Card (ESPN)
Lightweight	Khama Worthy	def.	Devonte Smith	TKO (punches)	1	4:15
Bantamweight	Cory Sandhagen	def.	Raphael Assunção	Decision (unanimous) (30–27, 30–27, 29–28)	3	5:00
Lightweight	Drakkar Klose	def.	Christos Giagos	Decision (unanimous) (29–28, 29–28, 29–28)	3	5:00
Catchweight (140 lb)	Casey Kenney	def.	Manny Bermudez	Decision (unanimous) (29–28, 29–28, 29–28)	3	5:00
Early Preliminary Card (UFC Fight Pass)
Women's Strawweight	Hannah Cifers	def.	Jodie Esquibel	Decision (unanimous) (30–28, 30–27, 30–27)	3	5:00
Bantamweight	Kang Kyung-ho	def.	Brandon Davis	Decision (split) (28–29, 29–28, 29–28)	3	5:00
Women's Flyweight	Sabina Mazo	def.	Shana Dobson	Decision (unanimous) (30–24, 30–25, 30–25)	3	5:00

== Bonus awards ==
The following fighters received $50,000 bonuses.

- Fight of the Night: Paulo Costa vs. Yoel Romero
- Performance of the Night: Stipe Miocic and Khama Worthy

== Reported payout ==
The following is the reported payout to the fighters as reported to the California State Athletic Commission. It does not include sponsor money and also does not include the UFC's traditional "fight night" bonuses. The total disclosed payout for the event was $3,318,000.

- Stipe Miocic: $750,000 (no win bonus) def. Daniel Cormier: $500,000
- Nate Diaz: $250,000 (no win bonus) def. Anthony Pettis: $155,000
- Paulo Costa: $120,000 (includes $60,000 win bonus) def. Yoel Romero: $150,000
- Sodiq Yusuff: $28,000 (includes $14,000 win bonus) def. Gabriel Benítez: $40,000
- Derek Brunson: $190,000 (includes $95,000 win bonus) def. Ian Heinisch: $25,000
- Khama Worthy: $24,000 (includes $12,000 win bonus) def. Devonte Smith: $23,000
- Cory Sandhagen: $154,000 (includes $77,000 win bonus) def. Raphael Assunção: $79,000
- Drakkar Klose: $56,000 (includes $28,000 win bonus) def. Christos Giagos: $28,000
- Casey Kenney: $28,000 (includes $14,000 win bonus) def. Manny Bermudez: $20,000
- Hannah Cifers: $28,000 (includes $14,000 win bonus) def. Jodie Esquibel: $10,000
- Kyung Ho Kang: $44,000 (includes $22,000 win bonus) def. Brandon Davis: $21,000
- Sabina Mazo: $20,000 (includes $10,000 win bonus) def. Shana Dobson: $12,000

== Aftermath ==
This event won the UFC Honors 2019 Event of the Year award as voted by the fans.

== See also ==
- List of UFC events
- 2019 in UFC
- List of current UFC fighters
