= Sabina Mazo =

Colombian mixed martial arts fighter

- Born: Sabina Mazo Isaza; 25 March 1997 (age 29); Medellín, Colombia
- Other names: Colombian Queen
- Nationality: Colombian
- Height: 5 ft 7 in (1.70 m)
- Weight: 125 lb (57 kg; 8.9 st)
- Division: Flyweight
- Reach: 68 in (173 cm)
- Fighting out of: Gardena, California, United States
- Team: Kings MMA (2016–2020) Black House MMA (2020-current)
- Rank: Brown belt in Brazilian jiu-jitsu under Ricardo Testai
- Years active: 2015–present

Mixed martial arts record
- Total: 14
- Wins: 10
- By knockout: 2
- By submission: 1
- By decision: 7
- Losses: 4
- By submission: 2
- By decision: 2

Other information
- Mixed martial arts record from Sherdog

Sabina Mazo Isaza (born 25 March 1997) is a Colombian mixed martial artist who competed in the Flyweight (MMA) and Bantamweight (MMA) divisions in the Ultimate Fighting Championship (UFC). She is a two-time flyweight Legacy Fighting Alliance (LFA) champion. On 4 August 2023, she became the current LFA women's strawweight champion.

== Background ==
Mazo was born in Medellín, Colombia, but moved with her family to Florida, United States, as a baby. After three years in United States, the family returned to Medellín, where she eventually grew up. Without any preceding interest in martial arts, Mazo began training in Brazilian jiu-jitsu in Colombia at the age of fifteen. Soon after she picked up boxing and continued towards mixed martial arts.

== Mixed martial arts career ==
=== Early career ===
Mazo was the two-time Legacy Fighting Alliance flyweight champion and amassed a record of 6–0 prior to the signing by the UFC.

=== Ultimate Fighting Championship ===
Mazo made her promotional debut against Maryna Moroz on 30 March 2019, at UFC on ESPN 2. She lost the fight via unanimous decision.

Mazo faced Shana Dobson on 17 August 2019, at UFC 241. She won the fight via unanimous decision.

Mazo next faced JJ Aldrich on 18 January 2020, at UFC 246. She won the fight by split decision.

Mazo faced Justine Kish on 12 September 2020, at UFC Fight Night 177. She won the fight via a rear-naked choke submission in round three.

Mazo faced Alexis Davis in a bantamweight bout on 27 February 2021, at UFC Fight Night 186. She lost the fight via unanimous decision.

Mazo faced Mariya Agapova on 9 October 2021, at UFC Fight Night 194. She lost the fight via rear-naked choke in round three.

Mazo was scheduled to face Mandy Böhm on 12 March 2022, at UFC Fight Night 203. However, Böhm withdrew from the bout and was replaced by Miranda Maverick. Mazo lost the fight via rear-naked choke in round two.

After completing her contract with her last bout, she was not offered a new contract.

=== Post UFC ===
In her first bout after UFC release, Mazo faced Sandra Lavado to regain the LFA Women's Flyweight Championship on 4 August 2023 at LFA 164, winning the title and bout via unanimous decision.

== Championships and accomplishments ==
=== Mixed martial arts ===
- Legacy Fighting Alliance (LFA)
  - LFA Women's Flyweight Championship (three times) vs. Shannon Sinn, Carol Yariwaki and Sandra Lavado
    - One successful title defense
    - Mazo became the first person to win the same LFA title twice and improved her perfect LFA record to 5–0, which ties her for the most wins by a woman in LFA history. She is now the second and fifth person to become the promotion's 125-pound women's champion.

== Mixed martial arts record ==
Professional record breakdown
| 14 matches | 10 wins | 4 losses |
| By knockout | 2 | 0 |
| By submission | 1 | 2 |
| By decision | 7 | 2 |

| Res. | Record | Opponent | Method | Event | Date | Round | Time | Location | Notes |
|---|---|---|---|---|---|---|---|---|---|
| Win | 10–4 | Sandra Lavado | Decision (unanimous) | LFA 164 | 4 August 2023 | 5 | 5:00 | El Paso, Texas, United States | Won the vacant LFA Women's Flyweight Championship. |
| Loss | 9–4 | Miranda Maverick | Submission (rear-naked choke) | UFC Fight Night: Santos vs. Ankalaev | 12 March 2022 | 2 | 2:15 | Las Vegas, Nevada, United States | |
| Loss | 9–3 | Mariya Agapova | Submission (rear-naked choke) | UFC Fight Night: Dern vs. Rodriguez | 8 October 2021 | 3 | 0:53 | Las Vegas, Nevada, United States | Return to Flyweight. |
| Loss | 9–2 | Alexis Davis | Decision (unanimous) | UFC Fight Night: Rozenstruik vs. Gane | 27 February 2021 | 3 | 5:00 | Las Vegas, Nevada, United States | Bantamweight debut. |
| Win | 9–1 | Justine Kish | Submission (rear-naked choke) | UFC Fight Night: Waterson vs. Hill | 12 September 2020 | 3 | 3:57 | Las Vegas, Nevada, United States | |
| Win | 8–1 | JJ Aldrich | Decision (split) | UFC 246 | 18 January 2020 | 3 | 5:00 | Las Vegas, Nevada, United States9 | |
| Win | 7–1 | Shana Dobson | Decision (unanimous) | UFC 241 | 17 August 2019 | 3 | 5:00 | Anaheim, California, United States | |
| Loss | 6–1 | Maryna Moroz | Decision (unanimous) | UFC on ESPN: Barboza vs. Gaethje | 30 March 2019 | 3 | 5:00 | Philadelphia, Pennsylvania, United States | |
| Win | 6–0 | Caroline Yariwake | Decision (unanimous) | LFA 54 | 16 November 2018 | 5 | 5:00 | Costa Mesa, California, United States | Defended the LFA Women's Flyweight Championship. |
| Win | 5–0 | Shannon Sinn | Decision (unanimous) | LFA 37 | 20 April 2018 | 5 | 5:00 | Sioux Falls, South Dakota, United States | Won the vacant LFA Women's Flyweight Championship. |
| Win | 4–0 | Linsey Williams | KO (head kick) | LFA 23 | 22 September 2017 | 1 | 4:26 | Bossier City, Louisiana, United States | |
| Win | 3–0 | Jamie Thorton | KO (head kick) | LFA 9 | 14 April 2017 | 1 | 4:50 | Shawnee, Oklahoma, United States | |
| Win | 2–0 | Reina Cordoba | Decision (unanimous) | Center Real Fights 19 | 21 November 2015 | 3 | 5:00 | San José, Costa Rica | |
| Win | 1–0 | Alejandra Lara | Decision (unanimous) | Striker FC 18 | 26 March 2015 | 3 | 5:00 | Barranquilla, Colombia | Flyweight debut. |

== See also ==
- List of female mixed martial artists
