= UFC 272 =

UFC mixed martial arts event in 2022

UFC 272: Covington vs. Masvidal
- The poster for UFC 272: Covington vs. Masvidal
- Promotion: Ultimate Fighting Championship
- Date: March 5, 2022
- Venue: T-Mobile Arena
- City: Paradise, Nevada, United States
- Attendance: 19,425
- Total gate: $6,760,000

Event chronology
UFC Fight Night: Makhachev vs. Green	UFC 272: Covington vs. Masvidal	UFC Fight Night: Santos vs. Ankalaev

UFC 272: Covington vs. Masvidal was a mixed martial arts event produced by the Ultimate Fighting Championship that took place on March 5, 2022, at the T-Mobile Arena in Paradise, Nevada, part of the Las Vegas Metropolitan Area, United States.

== Background ==
A UFC Featherweight Championship trilogy bout between current champion Alexander Volkanovski and former champion Max Holloway was originally expected to headline the event. The pairing first met at UFC 245, where Volkanovski defeated Holloway via unanimous decision to capture the title. Their second meeting took place at UFC 251, with Volkanovski successfully defending the title via split decision (a result which was met with controversy by fans, fellow fighters, and media outlets alike). However, two days after the trilogy announcement, Holloway withdrew due to an aggravated previous injury. He was replaced by former title challenger Chan Sung Jung and the bout was moved to UFC 273 on April 9.

A UFC Bantamweight Championship title unification rematch between current champion Aljamain Sterling and former champion/current interim title holder Petr Yan was expected to take place at this event. The pairing previously met at UFC 259, with Sterling winning the title by disqualification (intentional illegal knee strike) in the fourth round, becoming the first fighter to win a UFC title by disqualification. The rematch was initially expected to take place at UFC 267, however Sterling withdrew from the contest due to lingering neck issues and an interim title bout between Yan and Cory Sandhagen was set. The UFC then opted to move the pairing from this event to UFC 273.

After the postponement of the title fights, a welterweight bout between former interim UFC Welterweight Champion Colby Covington and former title challenger Jorge Masvidal headlined the event.

A heavyweight bout between Greg Hardy and Serghei Spivac was originally scheduled for UFC 270, but it was moved to this event after Hardy suffered a finger injury.

A five round lightweight bout between former UFC Lightweight Champion Rafael dos Anjos and Rafael Fiziev was originally scheduled to headline UFC Fight Night: Walker vs. Hill, but it was postponed to this event due to visa issues with Fiziev. However, Fiziev was forced to withdraw due to testing positive for COVID-19. He was replaced by Renato Moicano on just 4 days notice at a catchweight of 160 pounds.

A lightweight bout between Devonte Smith and Erick Gonzalez was scheduled for the event. However, Gonzalez was forced to withdraw from the event due to a foot injury. He was replaced by Ľudovít Klein.

Former UFC Women's Flyweight Championship challenger Jessica Eye was expected to face Manon Fiorot in a women's flyweight bout at the event. However, a week before the event, Eye withdrew due to injury and the bout was cancelled.

During the event's broadcast, former UFC Lightweight Champion Khabib Nurmagomedov was announced as the next "modern wing" UFC Hall of Fame inductee.

== Results ==
Main card
Weight class				Method	Round	Time	Notes
Welterweight	Colby Covington	def.	Jorge Masvidal	Decision (unanimous) (49–46, 50–44, 50–45)	5	5:00
Catchweight (160 lb)	Rafael dos Anjos	def.	Renato Moicano	Decision (unanimous) (49–45, 49–44, 50–44)	5	5:00
Featherweight	Bryce Mitchell	def.	Edson Barboza	Decision (unanimous) (30–25, 30–26, 30–27)	3	5:00
Welterweight	Kevin Holland	def.	Alex Oliveira	TKO (elbows)	2	0:38
Heavyweight	Serghei Spivac	def.	Greg Hardy	TKO (punches)	1	2:16
Preliminary card (ESPN (Note: The ESPN broadcast only aired the Rodriguez vs Yan and Turner vs Mullarkey bouts due to a college basketball game that aired on ESPN during the Moroz vs Agapova and Negumereanu vs Nzechukwu bouts.) / ESPN+)
Lightweight	Jalin Turner	def.	Jamie Mullarkey	TKO (punches)	2	0:46
Women's Strawweight	Marina Rodriguez	def.	Yan Xiaonan	Decision (split) (29–28, 28–29, 29–28)	3	5:00
Light Heavyweight	Nicolae Negumereanu	def.	Kennedy Nzechukwu	Decision (split) (27–29, 29–27, 29–27)	3	5:00	(Note: Nzechukwu was deducted 1 point in Round 3 due to repeated eye pokes.)
Women's Flyweight	Maryna Moroz	def.	Mariya Agapova	Submission (arm-triangle choke)	2	3:27
Early preliminary card (ESPN+ / UFC Fight Pass)
Featherweight	Umar Nurmagomedov	def.	Brian Kelleher	Submission (rear-naked choke)	1	3:15
Flyweight	Tim Elliott	def.	Tagir Ulanbekov	Decision (unanimous) (29–28, 29–28, 29–28)	3	5:00
Lightweight	Ľudovít Klein	def.	Devonte Smith	Decision (split) (28–29, 29–28, 30–27)	3	5:00
Light Heavyweight	Dustin Jacoby	def.	Michał Oleksiejczuk	Decision (unanimous) (29–28, 29–28, 29–28)	3	5:00

== Bonus awards ==
The following fighters received $50,000 bonuses.

- Fight of the Night: Colby Covington vs. Jorge Masvidal
- Performance of the Night: Kevin Holland and Maryna Moroz

== See also ==
- List of UFC events
- List of current UFC fighters
- 2022 in UFC
