= UFC on ESPN: Lemos vs. Jandiroba =

Mixed martial arts event in 2024

- The poster for UFC on ESPN: Lemos vs. Jandiroba
- Promotion: Ultimate Fighting Championship
- Date: July 20, 2024
- Venue: UFC Apex
- City: Enterprise, Nevada, United States
- Attendance: Not announced

Event chronology
UFC on ESPN: Namajunas vs. Cortez	UFC on ESPN: Lemos vs. Jandiroba	UFC 304: Edwards vs. Muhammad 2

UFC on ESPN: Lemos vs. Jandiroba (also known as UFC on ESPN 60 and UFC Vegas 94) was a mixed martial arts event produced by the Ultimate Fighting Championship that took place on July 20, 2024, at the UFC Apex facility, in Enterprise, Nevada, part of the Las Vegas Metropolitan Area, United States.

== Background ==
A women's strawweight bout between former UFC Women's Strawweight Championship challenger Amanda Lemos and former Invicta FC Strawweight Champion Virna Jandiroba headlined the event.

A featherweight bout between Dan Ige and Joanderson Brito was scheduled for the event. However, Brito was forced to pull from the event due to a leg injury. He was replaced by Chepe Mariscal. Subsequently, Ige withdrew from this bout on the day of UFC 303 to serve as a replacement fighter at that event. Mariscal was eventually booked to face Damon Jackson at UFC Fight Night: Tybura vs. Spivac 2.

A women's flyweight bout between Tracy Cortez and Miranda Maverick was scheduled to take place at this event. However, Cortez was pulled from the contest in order to serve as a replacement against former two-time UFC Women's Strawweight Champion Rose Namajunas a week earlier at UFC on ESPN: Namajunas vs. Cortez, after her original opponent Maycee Barber pulled out. Maverick instead faced Dione Barbosa.

A middleweight bout between Brad Tavares and Park Jun-yong was expected to take place at the event. However, the bout was scrapped when Park was not medically cleared after the weigh-ins.

== Results ==
Main card (ESPN / ESPN+)
Weight class				Method	Round	Time	Notes
Women's Strawweight	Virna Jandiroba	def.	Amanda Lemos	Submission (armbar)	2	4:48
Featherweight	Steve Garcia	def.	Choi Seung-woo	TKO (punches)	1	1:36
Lightweight	Kurt Holobaugh	def.	Kaynan Kruschewsky	Decision (unanimous) (29–28, 29–28, 29–28)	3	5:00
Flyweight	Bruno Gustavo da Silva	def.	Cody Durden	TKO (punches)	2	2:58
Featherweight	Choi Doo-ho	def.	Bill Algeo	TKO (submission to punch)	2	3:38
Featherweight	Hyder Amil	def.	Lee Jeong-yeong	TKO (punches)	1	1:05
Preliminary card (ESPN2 / ESPN+)
Bantamweight	Cody Gibson	def.	Brian Kelleher	Submission (arm-triangle choke)	1	3:58
Women's Flyweight	Miranda Maverick	def.	Dione Barbosa	Decision (unanimous) (29–28, 30–27, 30–27)	3	5:00
Lightweight	Trey Ogden	def.	Loik Radzhabov	Decision (unanimous) (29–28, 29–28, 30–27)	3	5:00
Women's Flyweight	Luana Carolina	def.	Lucie Pudilová	Decision (unanimous) (29–28, 29–28, 30–27)	3	5:00
Heavyweight	Thomas Petersen	def.	Mohammed Usman	Decision (unanimous) (30–27, 30–27, 30–27)	3	5:00

== Bonus awards ==
The following fighters received $50,000 bonuses.

- Fight of the Night: No bonus awarded.
- Performance of the Night: Virna Jandiroba, Steve Garcia, Bruno Gustavo da Silva, and Hyder Amil

== See also ==
- 2024 in UFC
- List of current UFC fighters
- List of UFC events
