= Alexa Conners =

American MMA fighter

- Born: February 15, 1991 (age 35); Winchester, VA. USA
- Nationality: American
- Height: 5 ft 6 in (1.68 m)
- Division: Bantamweight (135 lb)
- Fighting out of: Columbia, SC USA
- Team: Revolution Martial Arts
- Years active: 2016–present

Mixed martial arts record
- Total: 14
- Wins: 8
- By knockout: 3
- By submission: 0
- By decision: 5
- Losses: 6
- By knockout: 2
- By submission: 2
- By decision: 2

Other information
- Mixed martial arts record from Sherdog

Alexa Conners (born February 15, 1991) is an American mixed martial artist and competes in Bantamweight division. She formerly competed for Invicta Fighting Championships .

== Background ==
Alexa was born in Winchester, Virginia, United States. she worked in engineering industry as a sales person prior fully committed to MMA professionally.

== Mixed martial arts career ==
=== Invicta Fighting Championships ===
Conners made her promotional debut on May 7, 2016 at Invicta FC 17: Evinger vs. Schneider against Laura Howarth . She lost the fight via a split decision with the score card of (29-28, 28-29, 29-28).

Her next fight was on November 18, 2016 at Invicta FC 20: Evinger vs. Kunitskaya against Stephanie Egger and she won the fight via a split decision.

=== Beatdown and LFA ===
On March 18, 2017, Spencer faced Mariah Prussia at Beatdown 20. She won the fight via technical knock out on round one.

Conner faced Calie Cutleron April 7, 2017 at LFA 8. She won the fight via unanimous decision.

=== Return to Invicta Fighting Championships ===
Conners returned to Invicta and faced Katharina Lehner on August 31, 2017 at Invicta FC 25: Kunitskaya vs. Pa'aluhi. She lost the fight via a technical knock out.

Conners faced Julia Avila on November 16, 2018 at Invicta FC 32: Spencer vs. Sorenson. She lost the fight via technical knockout in round two.

Conners faced Mariya Agapova on September 6, 2019 at Invicta FC: Phoenix Series 2. She won the fight via a submission in round one.

=== Global Fight League ===
Conners was scheduled to face Cat Zingano in the inaugural Global Fight League event on May 24, 2025 at GFL 1. However, all GFL events were cancelled indefinitely.

== Personal life ==
Conners' father, who suffered from mental illness killed his girl friend and took his own life. The event effected Conners deeply and she uses fighting as the platform to spread mental illness awareness and provide support for those who need help.

“My father — this September [2018], it's been two years — he battled a mental-health illness his whole life and never got help for it,” Conners told Combat Press. “He never got counseling, and eventually it got the best of him. He killed his own girlfriend and then took his own life. That, obviously, was a life-changing event for my whole family. So, one of my things is ‘fight the stigma.’ I want to help spread mental-health awareness and try to help people or at least get our government to start talking about it [and] actually put money out there for people to get help, because it's ridiculous. Our mental-health system sucks.”

== Mixed martial arts record ==
Professional record breakdown
14 matches	8 wins	6 losses
By knockout	3	2
By submission	0	2
By decision	5	2

Res.	Record	Opponent	Method	Event	Date	Round	Time	Location	Notes
Loss	8–6	Emily Martins	Submission (rear-naked choke)	Cage Fury FC 149	December 20, 2025	1	1:44	Atlantic City, New Jersey, United States	For the Cage Fury FC Women's Bantamweight Championship.
Win	8–5	Danielle Wynn	TKO (punches)	Conflict MMA 61	April 27, 2024	1	1:07	Columbia, South Carolina, United States	
Loss	7–5	Elizabeth Schroder	Decision (unanimous)	Cage Fury FC 125	September 15, 2023	3	5:00	New Town, North Dakota, United States	
Win	7–4	Elizabeth Phillips	Decision (split)	Conflict MMA 57	May 27, 2023	3	5:00	Columbia, South Carolina, United States	Catchweight (140 lb) bout.
Win	6–4	Maria Rios	Decision (unanimous)	Conflict MMA 55	November 5, 2022	3	5:00	Charleston, South Carolina, United States	Return to Bantamweight.
Loss	5–4	Mariya Agapova	Submission (rear-naked choke)	Invicta FC: Phoenix Series 2	September 6, 2019	1	3:03	Kansas City, Kansas, United States	Flyweight debut.
Loss	5–3	Julia Avila	TKO (front kick and punches)	Invicta FC 32	November 16, 2018	2	4:43	Shawnee, Oklahoma, United States	
Win	5–2	Carina Damm	TKO (punches)	Extreme Beatdown 21	March 10, 2018	3	4:27	New Town, North Dakota, United States	
Loss	4–2	Katharina Lehner	TKO (punches)	Invicta FC 25	August 31, 2017	1	4:21	Lemoore, California, United States	
Win	4–1	Calie Cutler	Decision (unanimous)	LFA 8	April 7, 2017	3	5:00	Greenville, South Carolina, United States	Catchweight (140 lb) bout.
Win	3–1	Mariah Prussia	TKO (punches)	Extreme Beatdown 20	March 18, 2017	1	4:14	New Town, North Dakota, United States	
Win	2–1	Anna DeCrescente	Decision (unanimous)	National FC 90	January 20, 2017	3	5:00	Kennesaw, Georgia, United States	
Win	1–1	Stephanie Egger	Decision (split)	Invicta FC 20	November 18, 2016	3	5:00	Kansas City, Missouri, United States	
Loss	0–1	Laura Howarth	Decision (split)	Invicta FC 17	May 16, 2016	3	5:00	Costa Mesa, California, United States	Bantamweight debut.

== See also ==
- List of female mixed martial artists
