= Matthew Semelsberger =

American mixed martial arts fighter

- Born: November 23, 1992 (age 33); Rockville, Maryland, United States
- Nickname: Semi the Jedi
- Height: 6 ft 1 in (1.85 m)
- Weight: 170 lb (77 kg; 12 st 2 lb)
- Division: Middleweight; Welterweight
- Reach: 75 in (191 cm)
- Team: Crazy 88 MMA; Clinch Academy
- Rank: Blue belt in Brazilian Jiu-Jitsu; Purple belt in Muay Thai
- Years active: 2017–present

Mixed martial arts record
- Total: 19
- Wins: 11
- By knockout: 6
- By submission: 1
- By decision: 4
- Losses: 8
- By knockout: 3
- By submission: 1
- By decision: 4

Other information
- Mixed martial arts record from Sherdog

Matthew Semelsberger (born November 23, 1992) is an American mixed martial artist who competed in the Welterweight division of the Ultimate Fighting Championship.

== Background ==
Semelsberger is a 2011 graduate of Urbana High School, where he competed in football, lacrosse, and wrestling. Excelling particularly in football, he led Urbana to a state championship win, and later played Division I-AA football with a scholarship at Marist College while majoring in criminal justice. Semelsberger started 15 games for the Red Foxes at strong safety in his career with a great senior season of 67 tackles, 5 pass deflections, 1 sack, and 1 forced fumble. At the age of 14, he entered an MMA program at a school close to home, Clinch Academy. Having done some years of youth wrestling, Matthew wanted to learn how to fight in case he ever found himself in a position where violence was his only option. After one of his wrestling buddies showed him his collection of the Ultimate Fighting Championship DVDs and VHS tapes, he was enamored with the sport and decided to start his goal of making the UFC.

== Mixed martial arts career ==
=== Early career ===
Starting his professional career in 2017, Semelsberger compiled a 6-2 record in the regional East Coast scene, competing in such promotions like CFFC, where he won a close decision against Zulkarnaiyn Kamchybekov at CFFC 74, Maverick MMA where he won a bout against Kris Gratalo at Maverick MMA 15 after Gratalo threw in the towel between rounds due to a broken arm, and Art of War Cage Fighting, where Semelsberger picked up his final win before being given a UFC contract after knocking out Richard Patishnock at AoWCF 17.

=== Ultimate Fighting Championship ===
Semelsberger was initially scheduled to make his promotional debut against Philip Rowe at UFC on ESPN: Munhoz vs. Edgar on August 22, 2020. However, Rowe pulled out of the bout citing a toe injury and was replaced by Carlton Minus. Despite knocking Minus down in the first round, Semelsberger won the fight via unanimous decision.

Semelsberger made his sophomore appearance in the promotion against Jason Witt at UFC Fight Night: Edwards vs. Muhammad on March 14, 2021. He won the fight via first-minute knockout. This win earned him the Performance of the Night award.

Semelsberger faced Khaos Williams on June 19, 2021 at UFC on ESPN: The Korean Zombie vs. Ige. He lost the bout via unanimous decision.

Semelsberger faced Martin Sano Jr. on September 25, 2021 at UFC 266. He won the fight via knockout in round one.

Semelsberger faced A.J. Fletcher on March 12, 2022 at UFC Fight Night 203. He won the back-and-forth fight by unanimous decision.

Semelsberger faced Alex Morono on July 30, 2022 at UFC 277. He lost the fight by unanimous decision.

Semelsberger faced Jake Matthews on December 17, 2022 at UFC Fight Night 216. He won the fight via unanimous decision.

Semelsberger faced Jeremiah Wells on April 22, 2023 at UFC Fight Night 222. He lost the back-and-forth fight via split decision.

Semelsberger was scheduled to meet Yohan Lainesse on July 29, 2023 at UFC 291. However, Lainesse was removed from the event for undisclosed reasons and he was replaced by Uroš Medić. Semelsberger lost the bout via TKO in round three after being dropped with a spinning backfist and then finished with ground and pound.

Semelsberger faced Preston Parsons, replacing Bassil Hafez on January 13, 2024, at UFC Fight Night 234. He lost the fight by unanimous decision.

Semelsberger faced Charles Radtke on November 9, 2024 at UFC Fight Night 247. He lost the fight by technical knockout early in the first round.

On February 1, 2025, it was announced by Semelsberger that he was no longer part of the UFC roster.

== Bare-knuckle boxing ==
Semelsberger was scheduled to make his Bare Knuckle Fighting Championship debut against Prince Nyseam on February 7, 2026 at BKFC Knucklemania VI. However, he was forced to withdraw due to severe neck pain and was replaced by Brett Shoenfelt.

Semelsberger is scheduled to face Michael Manno on December 4, 2026 at BKFC Fight Night 50.

== Championships and accomplishments ==
=== Mixed martial arts ===
- Ultimate Fighting Championship
  - Performance of the night (One time) vs. Jason Witt

== Mixed martial arts record ==
Professional record breakdown
19 matches	11 wins	8 losses
By knockout	6	3
By submission	1	1
By decision	4	4

Res.	Record	Opponent	Method	Event	Date	Round	Time	Location	Notes
Loss	11–8	Charles Radtke	TKO (punches)	UFC Fight Night: Magny vs. Prates	November 9, 2024	1	0:51	Las Vegas, Nevada, United States	
Loss	11–7	Preston Parsons	Decision (unanimous)	UFC Fight Night: Ankalaev vs. Walker 2	January 13, 2024	3	5:00	Las Vegas, Nevada, United States	
Loss	11–6	Uroš Medić	TKO (spinning backfist and punches)	UFC 291	July 29, 2023	3	2:36	Salt Lake City, Utah, United States	
Loss	11–5	Jeremiah Wells	Decision (split)	UFC Fight Night: Pavlovich vs. Blaydes	April 22, 2023	3	5:00	Las Vegas, Nevada, United States	
Win	11–4	Jake Matthews	Decision (unanimous)	UFC Fight Night: Cannonier vs. Strickland	December 17, 2022	3	5:00	Las Vegas, Nevada, United States	
Loss	10–4	Alex Morono	Decision (unanimous)	UFC 277	July 30, 2022	3	5:00	Dallas, Texas, United States	
Win	10–3	A.J. Fletcher	Decision (unanimous)	UFC Fight Night: Santos vs. Ankalaev	March 12, 2022	3	5:00	Las Vegas, Nevada, United States	
Win	9–3	Martin Sano Jr.	KO (punch)	UFC 266	September 25, 2021	1	0:15	Las Vegas, Nevada, United States	
Loss	8–3	Khaos Williams	Decision (unanimous)	UFC on ESPN: The Korean Zombie vs. Ige	June 19, 2021	3	5:00	Las Vegas, Nevada, United States	
Win	8–2	Jason Witt	KO (punch)	UFC Fight Night: Edwards vs. Muhammad	March 13, 2021	1	0:16	Las Vegas, Nevada, United States	Performance of the Night.
Win	7–2	Carlton Minus	Decision (unanimous)	UFC on ESPN: Munhoz vs. Edgar	August 22, 2020	3	5:00	Las Vegas, Nevada, United States	
Win	6–2	Richard Patishnock	KO (punch)	Art of War Cage Fighting 17	February 8, 2020	1	2:14	Philadelphia, Pennsylvania, United States	
Win	5–2	Kris Gratalo	TKO (injury)	Maverick MMA 15	November 9, 2019	2	5:00	Dickson City, Pennsylvania, United States	Middleweight bout.
Win	4–2	Zulkarnaiyn Kamchybekov	Decision (split)	CFFC 74	May 17, 2019	3	5:00	Atlantic City, New Jersey, United States	Catchweight (175 lb) bout.
Loss	3–2	Jerome Featherstone	TKO (punches)	Shogun Fights 20	October 6, 2018	3	4:09	Baltimore, Maryland, United States	
Win	3–1	Scott Noble	TKO (punches)	Shogun Fights 18	April 14, 2018	2	4:53	Baltimore, Maryland, United States	Welterweight debut.
Loss	2–1	Darren Costa	Submission (brabo choke)	Shogun Fights 17	October 7, 2017	3	1:23	Baltimore, Maryland, United States	
Win	2–0	Brian Maxwell	Submission (heel hook)	Strike Off 10	June 17, 2017	3	1:43	Manassas Park, Virginia, United States	
Win	1–0	Donelei Benedetto	TKO (punches)	Shogun Fights 16	April 8, 2017	2	1:10	Baltimore, Maryland, United States	

== See also ==
- List of male mixed martial artists
