= Wu Yanan (fighter) =

Chinese mixed martial arts fighter

- Born: April 18, 1996 (age 30); Chaoyang, Liaoning, China
- Other names: Mulan
- Height: 5 ft 8 in (1.73 m)
- Weight: 125 lb (57 kg; 8 st 13 lb)
- Division: Bantamweight (2013–2017); Flyweight (2017–present)
- Reach: 66 in (168 cm)
- Style: Sanda
- Stance: Orthodox
- Fighting out of: Liaoning, China
- Trainer: Zhao Xuejun
- Rank: Blue belt in Brazilian Jiu-Jitsu
- Years active: 2013–present

Mixed martial arts record
- Total: 20
- Wins: 13
- By knockout: 6
- By submission: 5
- By decision: 2
- Losses: 7
- By knockout: 2
- By decision: 5

Other information
- University: Xi'an Physical Education University
- Mixed martial arts record from Sherdog

Wu Yanan (born April 18, 1996) is a Chinese mixed martial artist who competes in the Women's Bantamweight division. A professional competitor since 2013, she formerly competed for the Ultimate Fighting Championship, Chinese Kung Fu Championships, and WLF W.A.R.S.

== Background ==
Wu began training Sanda in middle school, eventually competing in the national level in the discipline. She graduated from Xi'an Physical Education University, where she majored in Sanda under the tutelage of Zhao Xuejun.

== Mixed martial arts career ==
=== Early career ===
Wu made her pro debut in 2013 under the banner of Fighting China, facing fellow debutante Joo Young Lee. Yanan won the bout by a first round TKO.

Wu's first appearance with the Chinese Kung Fu Championships came almost a year after her first fight, at CKF 9/21. She faced Bo Meng who was coming off of a win against Zhang Weili. Yanan won the fight by a unanimous decision. Six months later she faced Yang Liu, who was making her pro debut. Yanan won through a first round TKO. Wu's next fight was a rematch against Bo Meng at CKF 7/7, which Wu won by a split decision. At CKF 4: Day 1 Yanan faced another debutante in Jinghuan Zhu, which she won by a first round submission. It was her first and only fight at featherweight At WLF E.P.I.C. 5 Wu fought against Bayarmaa Munkhgerel, who hadn't yet won a pro fight, and won through a second round TKO. She returned to CKF to face Saeedeh Fardsanei who was making her debut, and won by a first round TKO.

Leaving the Chinese Kung Fu Championships, Wu fought against the 8-2 Yana Kunitskaya under the banner of Fightspirit Championship at Fightspirit Championship 6. She suffered the first professional loss of her career, with Kunitskaya stopping her by way of TKO, after only 32 seconds of the second round. Fighting at Kunlun Fight MMA 7, Yanan faced the 0-3 Anjela Pink winning in the first round through a TKO. At WLF W.A.R.S. 12 Wu faced the debuting Zuriana Makoeva, stopping her through a TKO in the fourth minute of the second round.

=== Ultimate Fighting Championship ===
Wu made her UFC debut on November 25, 2017, at UFC Fight Night 122 against Gina Mazany. She lost the fight via unanimous decision.

Wu faced Lauren Mueller on November 24, 2018, at UFC Fight Night 141. She won the fight via first round armbar.

Wu was scheduled to fight Luana Carolina on May 11, 2019, at UFC 237, but was forced to pull out due to an injury. The fight was rescheduled for UFC Fight Night 157 on August 31, 2019, however Carolina pulled out of the fight due to a fractured spine. Wu instead faced former DEEP Jewels champion Mizuki Inoue. At the weigh-ins, Wu weighed in at 129 pounds, three pounds over the flyweight non-title fight limit, and forfeited 30% of her purse to Inoue. Wu lost the fight via split decision.

Wu was scheduled to face Bethe Correia on December 5, 2020, at UFC on ESPN 19 However, due to visa issues, they were rescheduled for UFC on ABC 1 on January 16, 2021. In early January 2021, it was reported that Corria was forced to withdraw from the bout due to undergoing surgery to remove her appendix. On January 7, it was announced that Wu would face UFC newcomer Joselyne Edwards. She lost the fight via unanimous decision.

Wu was scheduled to face Nicco Montaño on July 31, 2021, at UFC on ESPN 28. However, the fight was canceled after Montaño missed weight by seven pounds at the weigh-ins.

Wu was scheduled to face Josiane Nunes on February 26, 2022, at UFC Fight Night 202. However, Wu was pulled from the bout for undisclosed reasons and was replaced by promotional newcomer Jennifer Gonzalez.

Wu faced Mayra Bueno Silva on April 16, 2022, at UFC on ESPN 34. She lost the fight via unanimous decision. This fight earned her the Fight of the Night award.

Wu faced returning veteran Lucie Pudilová on August 20, 2022, at UFC 278. She lost the bout via TKO stoppage in the second round due to elbows on the ground.

In August 2022, it was announced that Wu was no longer on the UFC roster.

=== Post UFC ===
In her first bout after leaving the UFC, Wu faced Wang Cong on January 20, 2024 at Kunlun Fight 95, losing the bout via unanimous decision.

== Championships and accomplishments ==
- Ultimate Fighting Championship
  - Fight of the Night (One time) vs. Mayra Bueno Silva

== Mixed martial arts record ==
Professional record breakdown
20 matches	13 wins	7 losses
By knockout	6	2
By submission	5	0
By decision	2	5

Res.	Record	Opponent	Method	Event	Date	Round	Time	Location	Notes
Loss	13–7	Wang Cong	Decision (unanimous)	Kunlun Fight 95	January 20, 2024	3	5:00	Bangkok, Thailand	Return to Flyweight.
Loss	13–6	Lucie Pudilová	TKO (elbows)	UFC 278	August 20, 2022	2	4:04	Salt Lake City, Utah, United States	
Loss	13–5	Mayra Bueno Silva	Decision (unanimous)	UFC on ESPN: Luque vs. Muhammad 2	April 16, 2022	3	5:00	Las Vegas, Nevada, United States	Fight of the Night.
Loss	13–4	Joselyne Edwards	Decision (unanimous)	UFC on ABC: Holloway vs. Kattar	January 16, 2021	3	5:00	Abu Dhabi, United Arab Emirates	Return to Bantamweight.
Loss	13–3	Mizuki Inoue	Decision (split)	UFC Fight Night: Andrade vs. Zhang	August 31, 2019	3	5:00	Shenzhen, China	Catchweight (129 lb) bout; Yanan missed weight.
Win	13–2	Lauren Mueller	Submission (armbar)	UFC Fight Night: Blaydes vs. Ngannou 2	November 24, 2018	1	4:00	Beijing, China	Flyweight debut.
Loss	12–2	Gina Mazany	Decision (unanimous)	UFC Fight Night: Bisping vs. Gastelum	November 25, 2017	3	5:00	Shanghai, China	
Win	12–1	Zuriana Makoeva	TKO (punches)	WLF W.A.R.S. 12	March 11, 2017	2	3:19	Zhengzhou, China	
Win	11–1	Margarita Naschyokina	Submission (armbar)	Chin Woo Men: 2016-2017 Season, Stage 4	December 22, 2016	1	0:33	Hefei, China	
Win	10–1	Alena Kuchynskaya	TKO (punches)	Chin Woo Men: 2016-2017 Season, Stage 1	December 22, 2016	2	2:13	Beijing, China	
Win	9–1	Anjela Pink	TKO (punches)	Kunlun Fight MMA 7	December 25, 2016	1	1:17	Beijing, China	
Loss	8–1	Yana Kunitskaya	TKO (punches)	Fightspirit Championship 6	September 4, 2016	2	0:32	Saint Petersburg, Russia	
Win	8–0	Saeedeh Fardsanei	TKO (submission to punches)	Chinese Kung Fu Championships: Sunkin	August 13, 2016	1	1:22	Qingdao, China	
Win	7–0	Bayarmaa Munkhgerel	Technical Submission (armbar)	WLF E.P.I.C.: Elevation Power in Cage 5	June 29, 2016	2	3:43	Zhengzhou, China	
Win	6–0	Kristina Derecha	Submission (armbar)	CKF: China vs. Russia	January 30, 2016	1	3:41	Beijing, China	
Win	5–0	Jinghuan Zhu	Submission (armbar)	CKFC 4	December 19, 2015	1	1:22	Beijing, China	Featherweight bout.
Win	4–0	Yang Liu	TKO (submission to punches)	CKFC 3/13	March 13, 2015	1	0:48	Qian'an, China	
Win	3–0	Debbie Tucker	Decision (unanimous)	Fight King Gold Belt Contest	November 16, 2014	2	5:00	Xi'an, China	Bantamweight debut.
Win	2–0	Meng Bo	Decision (unanimous)	CKFC 9/21	September 21, 2014	5	3:00	Qian'an, China	Catchweight (132 lb) bout.
Win	1–0	Young Joon Lee	TKO (punches)	Fighting China	November 16, 2013	1	N/A	Zhaoqing, China	Catchweight (139 lb) bout.

== See also ==
- List of female mixed martial artists
