= Mariya Agapova =

Kazakhstani mixed martial arts fighter

- Born: April 7, 1997 (age 29); Pavlodar, Kazakhstan
- Other names: Money Mashka
- Height: 5 ft 6 in (1.68 m)
- Weight: 125 lb (57 kg; 8 st 13 lb)
- Division: Flyweight
- Reach: 68.5 in (174 cm)
- Fighting out of: Pavlodar, Kazakhstan
- Team: American Top Team
- Trainer: Roger Krahl (2021–present)
- Years active: 2015–present

Mixed martial arts record
- Total: 15
- Wins: 10
- By knockout: 3
- By submission: 5
- By decision: 2
- Losses: 5
- By knockout: 1
- By submission: 3
- By decision: 1

Other information
- Mixed martial arts record from Sherdog

Mariya Agapova (born April 7, 1997) is a Kazakhstani mixed martial artist who competed in the flyweight division of the Ultimate Fighting Championship (UFC). She is currently signed with the Bare Knuckle Fighting Championship (BKFC).

== Background ==
Agapova started training martial arts around the age of eight in order to learn to defend herself. She graduated from college specializing in physical education for kids.

== Mixed martial arts career ==
=== Early career ===
Agapova fought her early MMA career exclusively in Russia, China and Kazakhstan. She amassed an undefeated record of 6–0 prior to debuting on Dana White's Tuesday Night Contender Series.

=== Dana White's Tuesday Night Contender Series ===
Agapova appeared at Dana White's Contender Series 22 on July 30, 2019, facing Tracy Cortez. She lost the fight via unanimous decision.

=== Invicta Fighting Championships ===
Agapova made her Invicta Fighting Championships debut on September 6, 2019 against Alexa Conners at Invicta FC: Phoenix Series 2. She won the fight via a submission in round one.

Agapova next faced Marilia Santos on October 6, 2019 at Invicta FC 37: Gonzalez vs. Sanchez. She won the fight via technical knockout in round one. This win earned her the Performance of the Night award.

Agapova was scheduled to face Daiana Torquato on February 7, 2020 at Invicta FC 39: Frey vs. Cummins II. However, Agapova collided with a car when she was on her way to train at the ATT and had to withdraw from the bout.

=== Ultimate Fighting Championship ===
Agapova signed with the UFC in February 2020. She made her debut against Hannah Cifers on June 13, 2020 at UFC on ESPN: Eye vs. Calvillo. After dropping Cifers with a head kick, Agapova won the bout via first round submission. This win earned her the Performance of the Night award.

Agapova faced Shana Dobson on August 22, 2020 at UFC on ESPN 15. She lost the fight via second round TKO, coming on the receiving end of the largest betting odds upset in UFC women's history (tied with Holly Holm's upset victory over Ronda Rousey at UFC 193).

Agapova faced Sabina Mazo on October 9, 2021 at UFC Fight Night 194. She won the fight via rear-naked choke after knocking Mazo down in round three. This fight earned her the Performance of the Night award.

Agapova faced Maryna Moroz on March 5, 2022 at UFC 272. She lost the fight via a submission in round two.

Agapova was scheduled to face Ji Yeon Kim at UFC 277 on July 9, 2022. However, Agapova was forced out of the fight due to knee injury and she was replaced by Joselyne Edwards.

Agapova faced Gillian Robertson, replacing Melissa Gatto, on September 17, 2022 at UFC Fight Night 210. She lost the fight via rear-naked choke.

Agapova faced Luana Santos on July 13, 2024, at UFC on ESPN 59. She lost the fight by a rear-naked choke submission in the first round.

On July 31, 2024, it was reported that Agapova was removed from the UFC roster.

== Professional grappling career ==
Agapova competed against Helena Crevar at Pit Submission Series 5 on May 30, 2024. She lost the match by submission with a heel hook.

== Bare-knuckle boxing ==
On August 27, 2024, it was reported that Agapova had signed with the Bare Knuckle Fighting Championship (BKFC). Agapova made her Bare Knuckle Fighting Championship debut against Jessica Eye on June 21, 2025 at BKFC 76. She lost the fight by unanimous decision.

== Championships and accomplishments ==
=== Mixed martial arts ===
- Ultimate Fighting Championship
  - Performance of the Night (Two times) vs. Hannah Cifers and Sabina Mazo
- Invicta Fighting Championships
  - Performance of the Night (one time) vs. Marilia Santos

== Mixed martial arts record ==
Professional record breakdown
15 matches	10 wins	5 losses
By knockout	3	1
By submission	5	3
By decision	2	1

Res.	Record	Opponent	Method	Event	Date	Round	Time	Location	Notes
Loss	10–5	Luana Santos	Submission (rear-naked choke)	UFC on ESPN: Namajunas vs. Cortez	July 13, 2024	1	3:27	Denver, Colorado, United States	
Loss	10–4	Gillian Robertson	Technical Submission (rear-naked choke)	UFC Fight Night: Sandhagen vs. Song	September 17, 2022	2	2:19	Las Vegas, Nevada, United States	
Loss	10–3	Maryna Moroz	Submission (arm-triangle choke)	UFC 272	March 5, 2022	2	3:27	Las Vegas, Nevada, United States	
Win	10–2	Sabina Mazo	Submission (rear-naked choke)	UFC Fight Night: Dern vs. Rodriguez	October 9, 2021	3	0:53	Las Vegas, Nevada, United States	Performance of the Night.
Loss	9–2	Shana Dobson	TKO (punches)	UFC on ESPN: Munhoz vs. Edgar	August 22, 2020	2	1:38	Las Vegas, Nevada, United States	
Win	9–1	Hannah Cifers	Submission (rear-naked choke)	UFC on ESPN: Eye vs. Calvillo	June 13, 2020	1	2:42	Las Vegas, Nevada, United States	Performance of the Night.
Win	8–1	Marilia Santos	TKO (elbows)	Invicta FC 37: Gonzalez vs. Sanchez	October 6, 2019	1	4:55	Kansas City, Kansas, United States	Performance of the Night.
Win	7–1	Alexa Conners	Submission (rear-naked choke)	Invicta FC: Phoenix Series 2	September 6, 2019	1	3:03	Kansas City, Kansas, United States	
Loss	6–1	Tracy Cortez	Decision (unanimous)	Dana White's Contender Series 22	July 30, 2019	3	5:00	Las Vegas, Nevada, United States	
Win	6–0	Na Liang	TKO (punches)	Heroine FC 2	July 21, 2018	1	N/A	Zhengzhou, China	
Win	5–0	Liliya Kazak	Decision (split)	Fight Nights Global 82	December 16, 2017	3	5:00	Moscow, Russia	
Win	4–0	Yulia Kutsenko	Submission (armbar)	Fight Nights Global 72	August 24, 2017	3	3:47	Sochi, Russia	
Win	3–0	Yulia Litvinceva	TKO (punches)	Brave CF 6	April 29, 2017	1	2:15	Almaty, Kazakhstan	
Win	2–0	Dariya Kutuzova	Submission (rear-naked choke)	WFCA 28	May 20, 2016	1	2:45	Pavlodar, Kazakhstan	
Win	1–0	Yuliya Ivanova	Decision (unanimous)	WFCA 8	May 20, 2015	3	5:00	Pavlodar, Kazakhstan	Flyweight debut.

== Professional boxing record ==
2 fights	0 wins	1 loss
By decision	0	1
Draws	1	

No.	Result	Record	Opponent	Type	Round, time	Date	Location	Notes
2	Loss	0–1–1	(United States) Stacia Suttles	UD	4	16 November 2024	(United States) Tropicana Hotel & Casino, Atlantic City, New Jersey, U.S.	
1	Draw	0–0–1	(Germany) Nicole Schäfer	UD	6	27 September 2024	(United States) Lux Studios, Atlanta, Georgia, U.S.	

== Bare-knuckle boxing record ==
Professional record breakdown
1 match	0 wins	1 loss
By decision	0	1

Res.	Record	Opponent	Method	Event	Date	Round	Time	Location	Notes
Loss	0–1	Jessica Eye	Decision (unanimous)	BKFC 76	June 21, 2025	5	2:00	Fort Worth, Texas, United States	

== See also ==
- List of female mixed martial artists
