= Philip Rowe =

American mixed martial arts fighter

- Born: Philip Ambrose Rowe; July 18, 1990 (age 36); Brooklyn, New York, U.S.
- Other names: The Fresh Prince
- Height: 6 ft 3 in (1.91 m)
- Weight: 170 lb (77 kg; 12 st 2 lb)
- Division: Welterweight
- Reach: 80 in (203 cm)
- Fighting out of: Orlando, Florida, U.S.
- Team: Fusion Xcel Performance
- Rank: Black belt in Brazilian Jiu-Jitsu under Julien Williams
- Years active: 2014–present

Professional boxing record
- Total: 3
- Wins: 3
- By knockout: 1

Mixed martial arts record
- Total: 18
- Wins: 12
- By knockout: 7
- By submission: 5
- Losses: 6
- By knockout: 1
- By decision: 5

Other information
- Boxing record from BoxRec
- Mixed martial arts record from Sherdog

Philip Ambrose Rowe (born July 18, 1990) is an American mixed martial artist who competed in the welterweight division of the Ultimate Fighting Championship.

== Background ==
Rowe went to Daytona State College, eventually becoming a Well Logging Engineer before undergoing a fighting career.

== Mixed martial arts career ==
=== Early career ===
A professional since October 2014, Phil Rowe owns a 6–2 record on the regional scene with the wins being four submissions and two knockouts. After losing his first two bouts off his professional MMA career, via TKO in the first round against Roberto Yong at RITC 174 and via unanimous decision against Justin Lesko at XCC 20, Rowe won his first bout submitting Jeremy Bethea at House of Fame 4 via rear-naked choke in the second round. Rowe would go on to win his next 5 bouts on the regional scene all by first or second round stoppage, culminating at Island Fights 53, where he tapped out Matt McKeon in the second round.

Rowe was invited to compete at Dana White's Contender Series 25 on August 20, 2019, against Leon Shahbazyan. He won the bout and an UFC contract via third-round TKO.

=== Ultimate Fighting Championship ===
Phil Rowe was briefly linked to a welterweight bout with Laureano Staropoli at UFC on ESPN: Ngannou vs. Rozenstruik on March 28, 2020. However, Rowe was removed from the card in late February for undisclosed reasons and replaced by Khaos Williams.

Rowe was briefly linked to a bout with promotional newcomer Matthew Semelsberger at UFC on ESPN: Munhoz vs. Edgar on August 22, 2020. However, Rowe pulled out of the bout citing a toe injury and was replaced by Carlton Minus.

Rowe made his UFC debut against Gabriel Green at UFC 258 on February 13, 2021. He lost the bout via unanimous decision.

In his sophomore performance, Rowe faced Orion Cosce on July 31, 2021, at UFC on ESPN: Hall vs. Strickland. At the weigh-ins, Rowe weighed in at 173.5 pounds, two and half pounds over the welterweight non-title fight limit. His bout proceeded at a catchweight and he was fined 20% of his individual purse, which went to his opponent Orion Cosce. He won the bout via TKO stoppage in the second round.

Rowe faced Jason Witt on February 5, 2022, at UFC Fight Night: Hermansson vs. Strickland. He won the fight via technical knockout in round two.

Rowe was scheduled to face Abubakar Nurmagomedov on July 16, 2022, at UFC on ABC: Ortega vs. Rodríguez. However, the pairing was cancelled due to complications on both sides. Rowe has been forced to withdraw due to an injury, while Nurmagomedov is dealing with visa issues.

Rowe faced Niko Price on December 3, 2022, at UFC on ESPN 42. In a third round comeback, Rowe won the bout via TKO stoppage.

Rowe faced Neil Magny on June 24, 2023, at UFC on ABC 5. He lost the bout via split decision.

Rowe faced Jake Matthews on June 1, 2024, at UFC 302. He lost the fight by unanimous decision.

Rowe faced Ange Loosa on June 14, 2025, at UFC on ESPN 69. He won the fight by technical knockout in the third round.

Rowe faced Ko Seok-hyeon on November 1, 2025, at UFC Fight Night 263. He lost the fight by unanimous decision.

Replacing Austin Vanderford who withdrew for undisclosed reasons, Rowe faced Jean-Paul Lebosnoyani on February 21, 2026 at UFC Fight Night 267. He lost the fight by split decision.

On March 10, 2026, it was reported that Rowe was removed from the UFC roster.

== Professional grappling career ==
Rowe competed against Kody Steele at WNO: Jones v Ruotolo on June 18, 2021, and lost via decision.

Rowe then faced Gordon Ryan in an exhibition match in the main event of WNO: Ryan v Rowe on October 20, 2021. Rowe was submitted four times throughout the match.

Rowe competed against Craig Jones in the main event of Karate Combat's Pit Submission Series 2 on February 23, 2024. He was submitted with a flying triangle choke and lost the match.

Rowe competed against Lucas LaRue at Pit Submission Series 6 on June 28, 2024. He won the match by submission with a rear-naked choke.

== Mixed martial arts record ==
Professional record breakdown
19 matches	12 wins	7 losses
By knockout	7	1
By submission	5	0
By decision	0	6

Res.	Record	Opponent	Method	Event	Date	Round	Time	Location	Notes
Win	12–7	Jacob Kilburn	Submission (triangle choke)	Island Fights 97	May 22, 2026	1	2:44	Biloxi, Mississippi, United States	Catchweight (175 lb) bout.
Loss	11–7	Jean-Paul Lebosnoyani	Decision (split)	UFC Fight Night: Strickland vs. Hernandez	February 21, 2026	3	5:00	Houston, Texas, United States	
Loss	11–6	Ko Seok-hyeon	Decision (unanimous)	UFC Fight Night: Garcia vs. Onama	November 1, 2025	3	5:00	Las Vegas, Nevada, United States	
Win	11–5	Ange Loosa	TKO (punches)	UFC on ESPN: Usman vs. Buckley	June 14, 2025	3	4:03	Atlanta, Georgia, United States	
Loss	10–5	Jake Matthews	Decision (unanimous)	UFC 302	June 1, 2024	3	5:00	Newark, New Jersey, United States	
Loss	10–4	Neil Magny	Decision (split)	UFC on ABC: Emmett vs. Topuria	June 24, 2023	3	5:00	Jacksonville, Florida, United States	
Win	10–3	Niko Price	TKO (punches)	UFC on ESPN: Thompson vs. Holland	December 3, 2022	3	3:26	Orlando, Florida, United States	Catchweight (173.5 lb) bout; Rowe missed weight.
Win	9–3	Jason Witt	TKO (punches)	UFC Fight Night: Hermansson vs. Strickland	February 5, 2022	2	2:15	Las Vegas, Nevada, United States	
Win	8–3	Orion Cosce	TKO (punches)	UFC on ESPN: Hall vs. Strickland	July 31, 2021	2	4:21	Las Vegas, Nevada, United States	Catchweight (173.5 lb) bout; Rowe missed weight.
Loss	7–3	Gabriel Green	Decision (unanimous)	UFC 258	February 13, 2021	3	5:00	Las Vegas, Nevada, United States	
Win	7–2	Leon Shahbazyan	TKO (punches)	Dana White's Contender Series 25	August 20, 2019	3	0:16	Las Vegas, Nevada, United States	
Win	6–2	Matt McKeon	Submission (guillotine choke)	Island Fights 53	March 6, 2019	2	2:34	Ft. Walton Beach, Florida, United States	
Win	5–2	Andrew Hellner	Submission (guillotine choke)	Battleground MMA 5	June 16, 2018	1	2:19	Largo, Florida, United States	
Win	4–2	Cole Milani	TKO (punches)	CageSport 50	April 28, 2018	1	0:41	Tacoma, Washington, United States	Catchweight (176 lb) bout.
Win	3–2	Josh Zuckerman	Submission (rear-naked choke)	V3 Fights 64	November 11, 2017	1	2:59	Tampa, Florida, United States	
Win	2–2	Ian Brofsky	TKO (punches)	PA Cage Fight 27	February 17, 2017	2	1:28	Wilkes Barre, Pennsylvania, United States	Return to Welterweight.
Win	1–2	Jeremy Bethea	Submission (rear-naked choke)	House of Fame 4	October 29, 2015	2	2:22	Jacksonville, Florida, United States	
Loss	0–2	Justin Lesko	Decision (unanimous)	Xtreme Caged Combat 20	April 25, 2015	3	5:00	Philadelphia, Pennsylvania, United States	Lightweight debut.
Loss	0–1	Roberto Yong	TKO (punches)	Rage in the Cage 174	October 11, 2014	1	2:05	Phoenix, Arizona, United States	Welterweight debut.

== Professional boxing record ==
3 fights	3 wins	0 losses
By knockout	1	0
By decision	2	0

No.	Result	Record	Opponent	Type	Round, time	Date	Location	Notes
3	Win	3–0	Javanis Ross	UD	4	Aug 29, 2026	Kia Center, Orlando, Florida, U.S.	
2	Win	2–0	James Jones	MD	4	Feb 27, 2016	Beni Kedem Shrine Temple, Charleston, West Virginia, U.S.	
1	Win	1–0	Jihad St. John	TKO	2 (4)	Feb 12, 2016	Ramada Morgantown Hotel and Conference Center, Morgantown, West Virginia, U.S.	

== See also ==
- List of male mixed martial artists
