= UFC Fight Night: Dern vs. Rodriguez =

2021 MMA event

- The poster for UFC Fight Night: Dern vs. Rodriguez
- Promotion: Ultimate Fighting Championship
- Date: October 9, 2021
- Venue: UFC Apex
- City: Enterprise, Nevada, United States
- Attendance: Not announced

Event chronology
UFC Fight Night: Santos vs. Walker	UFC Fight Night: Dern vs. Rodriguez	UFC Fight Night: Ladd vs. Dumont

UFC Fight Night: Dern vs. Rodriguez (also known as UFC Fight Night 194, UFC Vegas 39 and UFC on ESPN+ 52) was a mixed martial arts event produced by the Ultimate Fighting Championship that took place on October 9, 2021 at the UFC Apex facility in Enterprise, Nevada, part of the Las Vegas Metropolitan Area, United States.

== Background ==
A women's strawweight bout between Marina Rodriguez and Mackenzie Dern headlined the event.

A middleweight bout between Phil Hawes and Deron Winn was expected to take place at the event. The pairing was initially scheduled to meet on July 17 at UFC on ESPN: Makhachev vs. Moisés, but Winn pulled out of that event citing a chest injury. In turn, Winn withdrew the day before the event due to health issues. He was briefly replaced by Chris Curtis, but Hawes declined the bout and it was ultimately scrapped.

Michael Trizano and Chas Skelly were scheduled to meet in a featherweight bout at the event. However, Skelly was removed from the bout two weeks before the event due to undisclosed reasons. As a result, the bout was canceled.

A middleweight bout between Jamie Pickett and Laureano Staropoli was originally scheduled for this event. However, the bout was moved to UFC Fight Night: Costa vs. Vettori after one of Pickett's coaches tested positive for COVID-19.

Sam Hughes was expected to face Lupita Godinez in a women's strawweight bout at this event. However, Hughes was pulled from the bout after testing positive for COVID-19 and was replaced by promotional newcomer Silvana Gómez Juárez.

At the weigh-ins, Jared Gooden weighed in at 174 pounds, three pounds over the welterweight non-title fight limit. His bout proceeded at a catchweight and he forfeited 20% of his purse to his opponent Randy Brown.

== Results ==
Main card (ESPN+)
Weight class				Method	Round	Time	Notes
Women’s Strawweight	Marina Rodriguez	def.	Mackenzie Dern	Decision (unanimous) (49–46, 49–46, 49–46)	5	5:00
Catchweight (174 lb)	Randy Brown	def.	Jared Gooden	Decision (unanimous) (30–27, 30–27, 30–27)	3	5:00
Flyweight	Matheus Nicolau	def.	Tim Elliott	Decision (unanimous) (29–28, 29–28, 29–28)	3	5:00
Women's Flyweight	Mariya Agapova	def.	Sabina Mazo	Submission (rear-naked choke)	3	0:53
Bantamweight	Chris Gutiérrez	def.	Felipe Colares	Decision (split) (28–29, 30–27, 30–27)	3	5:00
Preliminary card (ESPN+)
Heavyweight	Alexander Romanov	def.	Jared Vanderaa	TKO (punches)	2	4:43
Featherweight	Damon Jackson	def.	Charles Rosa	Decision (unanimous) (29–28, 29–27, 30–27)	3	5:00
Women's Strawweight	Lupita Godinez	def.	Silvana Gómez Juárez	Submission (armbar)	1	4:14
Lightweight	Steve Garcia	def.	Charlie Ontiveros	TKO (punches)	2	1:51

== Bonus awards ==
The following fighters received $50,000 bonuses.

- Fight of the Night: Marina Rodriguez vs. Mackenzie Dern
- Performance of the Night: Lupita Godinez and Mariya Agapova

== See also ==
- List of UFC events
- List of current UFC fighters
- 2021 in UFC
