= Devonte Smith =

American mixed martial arts fighter (born 1993)

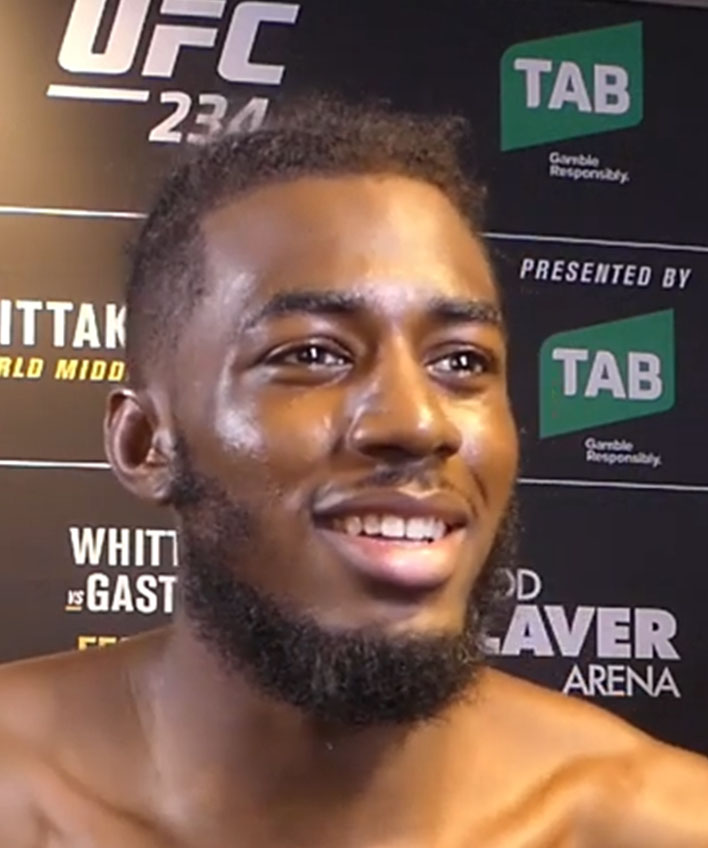
- Devonte Smith post fight interview at UFC 234
- Born: July 30, 1993 (age 33); Cleveland, Ohio, United States
- Other names: King Kage
- Height: 5 ft 9 in (1.75 m)
- Weight: 155 lb (70 kg; 11 st 1 lb)
- Division: Lightweight
- Reach: 76 in (193 cm)
- Fighting out of: Bedford, Ohio, United States
- Team: Factory X (2018–present)
- Rank: Purple belt in Brazilian jiu-jitsu
- Years active: 2015–present

Mixed martial arts record
- Total: 15
- Wins: 11
- By knockout: 10
- By submission: 1
- Losses: 4
- By knockout: 3
- By decision: 1

Other information
- Mixed martial arts record from Sherdog

Devonte Smith (born July 30, 1993) is an American mixed martial artist who competed in the Lightweight division of the Ultimate Fighting Championship.

== Background ==
Smith started training mixed martial arts around the age of 14 after seeing Quinton Jackson fight in PRIDE. He attended Bedford High School where he wrestled every year.

== Mixed martial arts career ==
=== Early career ===
After compiling an amateur record of 7–2–1, Smith started his professional MMA career in 2015 and fought primarily in Ohio. He amassed a record of 7–1 before competing in Dana White's Contender Series web-series program.

=== Dana White's Contender Series ===
Smith appeared in Dana White's Contender Series 16 on August 7, 2018, facing Joseph Lowry. He won the fight via knockout in the first round.

=== Ultimate Fighting Championship ===
Smith made his UFC debut on November 10, 2018, against Julian Erosa at UFC Fight Night: The Korean Zombie vs. Rodríguez. He won the fight via knockout in round one.

His next fight came on February 9, 2019, at UFC 234 against Dong Hyun Ma. He won the fight via technical knockout in round one. The win earned him the Performance of the Night bonus.

Smith was scheduled to face John Makdessi on August 17, 2019, at UFC 241. However, it was reported on July 30 that Makdessi was forced to withdraw for undisclosed reasons. Returning veteran Clay Collard was briefly linked as the replacement. In turn, Collard was removed from the bout during the week leading up to the event due to an undisclosed medical issue and he was replaced by promotional newcomer Khama Worthy. He lost the fight via technical knockout in round one.

Smith was expected to face Alex da Silva Coelho on February 6, 2021, at UFC Fight Night 184. However, Coelho pulled out due to undisclosed reasons, and was replaced by Justin Jaynes. Smith won the fight via technical knockout in round two.

Smith faced Jamie Mullarkey on October 2, 2021, at UFC Fight Night 193. He lost the fight via technical knockout in round two.

Smith was scheduled to face Erick Gonzalez on March 5, 2022, at UFC 272. However, Gonzalez was forced to withdraw from the event due to foot injuries and was replaced by Ľudovít Klein. Smith lost the fight via split decision.

In May 2022, it was reported that Smith was released by the UFC.

== Personal life ==
While preparing for his fight against Khama Worthy, Smith's sister Dariene was killed by a stray bullet in Columbus, Ohio, on July 11, 2020.

== Championships and accomplishments ==
=== Mixed martial arts ===
- Ultimate Fighting Championship
  - Performance of the Night (One time) vs. Dong Hyun Ma

== Mixed martial arts record ==
Professional record breakdown
15 matches	11 wins	4 losses
By knockout	10	3
By submission	1	0
By decision	0	1

Res.	Record	Opponent	Method	Event	Date	Round	Time	Location	Notes
Loss	11–4	Ľudovít Klein	Decision (split)	UFC 272	March 5, 2022	3	5:00	Las Vegas, Nevada, United States	
Loss	11–3	Jamie Mullarkey	TKO (punches)	UFC Fight Night: Santos vs. Walker	October 2, 2021	2	2:51	Las Vegas, Nevada, United States	
Win	11–2	Justin Jaynes	TKO (doctor stoppage)	UFC Fight Night: Overeem vs. Volkov	February 6, 2021	2	3:38	Las Vegas, Nevada, United States	Catchweight (160 lb) bout.
Loss	10–2	Khama Worthy	TKO (punches)	UFC 241	August 17, 2019	1	4:15	Anaheim, California, United States	
Win	10–1	Dong Hyun Ma	TKO (punches)	UFC 234	February 9, 2019	1	3:53	Melbourne, Australia	Performance of the Night.
Win	9–1	Julian Erosa	KO (punches)	UFC Fight Night: The Korean Zombie vs. Rodríguez	November 10, 2018	1	0:46	Denver, Colorado, United States	
Win	8–1	Joseph Lowry	KO (elbows)	Dana White's Contender Series 16	August 7, 2018	1	2:52	Las Vegas, United States	
Win	7–1	Justin Edwards	KO (punches)	Iron Tiger Fight Series / Alliance MMA	March 3, 2018	1	1:30	Columbus, Ohio, United States	
Win	6–1	Nick Gehrts	TKO (punches)	V3 Fights 65	November 18, 2017	4	1:03	Memphis, Tennessee, United States	
Win	5–1	Damonte Robinson	Submission (triangle choke)	IT Fight Series 74	July 29, 2017	1	2:54	Akron, Ohio, United States	
Loss	4–1	John Gunther	TKO (punches)	RFO: Big Guns 22	January 28, 2017	3	2:29	Mansfield, Ohio, United States	
Win	4–0	Xavier Nash	TKO (punches)	Pinnacle FC 14	September 2, 2016	3	0:50	Cheswick, Pennsylvania, United States	
Win	3–0	Fred Stonehouse	KO (punches)	GOTC MMA 21	June 4, 2016	1	3:01	Pittsburgh, Pennsylvania, United States	
Win	2–0	Mike Wiseman	TKO (punches)	Caged Madness 40	January 16, 2016	2	2:42	Akron, Ohio, United States	
Win	1–0	John Mosley	TKO (punches)	Caged Madness 38	September 26, 2015	1	4:29	Akron, Ohio, United States	Lightweight debut.

== See also ==
- List of male mixed martial artists
