= UFC Fight Night: Santos vs. Ankalaev =

UFC mixed martial arts event in 2022

- The poster for UFC Fight Night: Santos vs. Ankalaev
- Promotion: Ultimate Fighting Championship
- Date: March 12, 2022
- Venue: UFC Apex
- City: Enterprise, Nevada, United States
- Attendance: Not announced

Event chronology
UFC 272: Covington vs. Masvidal	UFC Fight Night: Santos vs. Ankalaev	UFC Fight Night: Volkov vs. Aspinall

UFC Fight Night: Santos vs. Ankalaev (also known as UFC Fight Night 203 and UFC on ESPN+ 61 or UFC Vegas 50) was a mixed martial arts event produced by the Ultimate Fighting Championship that took place on March 12, 2022 at the UFC Apex facility in Enterprise, Nevada, part of the Las Vegas Metropolitan Area, United States.

== Background ==
A light heavyweight bout between former UFC Light Heavyweight Championship challenger Thiago Santos and Magomed Ankalaev served as the event headliner.

A featherweight bout between Joshua Culibao and Damon Jackson was scheduled for the event. However, Culibao was pulled from the event for undisclosed reasons and was replaced by Kamuela Kirk.

Former KSW Women's Flyweight Champion Ariane Lipski and JJ Aldrich were scheduled to meet in a women's flyweight bout. However, Lipski was removed due to undisclosed reasons and replaced by Gillian Robertson.

Mandy Böhm was scheduled to meet Sabina Mazo in a women's flyweight bout at the event. However, Böhm withdrew from the bout due to undisclosed reasons and was replaced by Miranda Maverick.

A lightweight bout between Ricky Glenn and Drew Dober was expected to take place at the event. However, a week before the event, Glenn withdrew due to a torn groin and was replaced by Terrance McKinney.

== Results ==
Main card (ESPN+)
Weight class				Method	Round	Time	Notes
Light Heavyweight	Magomed Ankalaev	def.	Thiago Santos	Decision (unanimous) (49–46, 49–46, 48–47)	5	5:00
Bantamweight	Song Yadong	def.	Marlon Moraes	KO (punches)	1	2:06
Featherweight	Sodiq Yusuff	def.	Alex Caceres	Decision (unanimous) (30–27, 30–27, 29–28)	3	5:00
Light Heavyweight	Khalil Rountree Jr.	def.	Karl Roberson	TKO (body kick and punches)	2	0:25
Lightweight	Drew Dober	def.	Terrance McKinney	TKO (knee and punches)	1	3:17
Middleweight	Alex Pereira	def.	Bruno Silva	Decision (unanimous) (30–27, 30–27, 30–27)	3	5:00
Preliminary card (ESPN+)
Welterweight	Matthew Semelsberger	def.	A.J. Fletcher	Decision (unanimous) (29–28, 29–28, 29–28)	3	5:00
Women's Flyweight	JJ Aldrich	def.	Gillian Robertson	Decision (unanimous) (30–27, 30–27, 30–27)	3	5:00
Bantamweight	Javid Basharat	def.	Trevin Jones	Decision (unanimous) (30–27, 30–27, 29–28)	3	5:00
Featherweight	Damon Jackson	def.	Kamuela Kirk	Submission (arm-triangle choke)	2	4:42
Women's Flyweight	Miranda Maverick	def.	Sabina Mazo	Submission (rear-naked choke)	2	2:15
Middleweight	Cody Brundage	def.	Dalcha Lungiambula	Submission (guillotine choke)	1	3:41
Bantamweight	Guido Cannetti	def.	Kris Moutinho	TKO (punches)	1	2:07
Light Heavyweight	Azamat Murzakanov	def.	Tafon Nchukwi	KO (flying knee)	3	0:44

== Bonus awards ==
The following fighters received $50,000 bonuses.

- Fight of the Night: No bonus awarded.
- Performance of the Night: Song Yadong, Khalil Rountree Jr., Cody Brundage, and Azamat Murzakanov

== See also ==
- List of UFC events
- List of current UFC fighters
- 2022 in UFC
