= Damon Jackson =

American mixed martial artist (born 1988)

- Born: August 8, 1988 (age 38); Durant, Oklahoma, U.S.
- Other names: Action
- Height: 5 ft 11 in (180 cm)
- Weight: 155 lb (70 kg; 11 st 1 lb)
- Division: Featherweight; Lightweight
- Reach: 73 in (190 cm)
- Fighting out of: Dallas, Texas, U.S.
- Team: Octagon MMA (2013–2017); Fortis MMA (2017–present)
- Rank: Brown belt in Brazilian Jiu-Jitsu
- Years active: 2012–2024

Mixed martial arts record
- Total: 34
- Wins: 23
- By knockout: 4
- By submission: 15
- By decision: 4
- Losses: 9
- By knockout: 4
- By submission: 3
- By decision: 2
- Draws: 1
- No contests: 1

Other information
- Mixed martial arts record from Sherdog

Damon Jackson (born August 8, 1988) is an American former professional mixed martial artist having previously competed in the Featherweight division of the Ultimate Fighting Championship (UFC). A professional since 2012, Jackson competed for Bellator MMA and King of the Cage and he is the former Legacy Fighting Alliance Interim Featherweight Champion.

== Background ==
Born in Oklahoma, Jackson began wrestling from a young age and was talented. In high school, Jackson also competed in baseball and ran cross-country and track. Jackson was a state runner-up before continuing his career at Missouri Valley College where he was an All-American and had a fifth-place finish at the national tournament in 2012. Shortly after, Jackson began pursuing mixed martial arts.

== Mixed martial arts career ==
=== Early career ===
Jackson held an amateur MMA record of 6–1 before making his professional debut September 2012, winning via TKO in the first round. He would go on to win his next two bouts, both via submission.

=== Bellator MMA ===
Jackson debuted for Bellator on January 24, 2013, at Bellator 86 against Zac Church. Jackson won the fight via rear-naked choke submission in the second round.

On June 19, 2013, Jackson defeated Keith Miner via TKO due to strikes in the first round at Bellator 96, improving his record to 6–0.

=== Legacy Fighting Championship ===
In October 2013, Jackson fought and defeated Javier Obregon by submission in the second round at Legacy FC 24.

Jackson would win his next bout via rear-naked choke submission at Legacy FC 28 against Hunter Tucker on February 21, 2014.

Jackson then faced WEC and UFC veteran Leonard Garcia for the Legacy FC featherweight championship at Legacy FC 33 on July 18, 2014. Jackson won the fight via submission in the first round.

=== Ultimate Fighting Championship ===
Stepping in as a late replacement for an injured Justin Edwards, Jackson faced Yancy Medeiros at UFC 177 on August 30, 2014. Jackson lost the fight via submission in the second round, suffering his first loss of his career.

Jackson faced Rony Jason on May 30, 2015, at UFC Fight Night 67. He lost the fight via triangle choke submission in the first round. On June 18, 2015, it was announced that Jason tested positive for hydrochlorothiazide, which is a banned diuretic, therefore his submission victory against Jackson was overturned and he received a nine-month suspension.

Jackson faced Levan Makashvili on January 30, 2016, at UFC on Fox 18. The bout was ruled a majority draw (28-28, 28-28, 29-27) after Makashvili was deducted one point in the third round due to an illegal knee and eye poke.

=== Legacy Fighting Alliance/PFL ===
After going 6–1 fighting under the Legacy Fighting Alliance (LFA) banner, Jackson won the Featherweight Interim Legacy Fighting Alliance championship on August 10, 2018, against Nate Jennerman at Legacy Fighting Alliance 47 via knockout in round two.

He would sign with PFL to face Movlid Khaybulaev on May 23, 2019, at PFL 2, getting knocked out with a flying knee 10 seconds into the bout.

After the loss, Jackson returned to the LFA at LFA 83, submitting Mauro Chaulet in the first round via rear-naked choke.

=== Return to UFC ===
Jackson returned to UFC to face Mirsad Bektić, replacing Luiz Eduardo Garagorri on September 19, 2020, at UFC Fight Night 178. He won the fight via a submission in round three. This win earned him a Performance of the Night bonus.

Jackson faced Ilia Topuria on December 5, 2020, at UFC on ESPN 19. He lost the fight via knockout in round one.

Jackson was scheduled to face T.J. Laramie on May 1, 2021, at UFC Fight Night 188. However in late March, Laramie pulled out of the fight for undisclosed reasons, and he was replaced by Luke Sanders. In turn, Jackson withdrew from the bout and was replaced by Felipe Colares who also lost his original opponent at the event.

Jackson faced Charles Rosa on October 9, 2021, at UFC Fight Night 194. He won the fight via unanimous decision.

Jackson was scheduled to face Joshua Culibao on March 12, 2022 UFC Fight Night 203. However, Culibao was pulled from the event for undisclosed reasons and he was replaced by Kamuela Kirk. Jackson won the fight via an arm triangle submission in round two.

Jackson was scheduled to face Darrick Minner on June 4, 2022, at UFC Fight Night 207. However, for undisclosed reasons, Minner was pulled from the event and he was replaced by newcomer Daniel Argueta. Jackson won the bout via unanimous decision.

Jackson faced Pat Sabatini on September 17, 2022, at UFC Fight Night 210. He won the fight via technical knockout in round one. This fight earned him the Performance of the Night award.

Jackson faced Dan Ige January 14, 2023, at UFC Fight Night 217. He lost the fight via knockout in the second round.

Jackson faced Billy Quarantillo on August 5, 2023, at UFC Fight Night 226. He lost the bout via unanimous decision.

Jackson faced Alexander Hernandez on April 6, 2024 at UFC Fight Night 240. At the weigh-ins, Hernandez weighed in at 147.5 pounds, one and a half pounds over the featherweight non-title fight limit. The bout proceeded at catchweight and Hernandez was fined 20% of his purse, which went to Jackson. Jackson won the bout by split decision.

Jackson faced Chepe Mariscal on August 10, 2024 at UFC on ESPN 61. At the weigh-ins, Mariscal weighed in at 149.5 pounds, three and a half pounds over the featherweight non-title fight limit. The bout proceeded at catchweight and Mariscal was fined 20 percent of his purse which went to Jackson. He lost the fight by unanimous decision.

Jackson faced Jim Miller on November 16, 2024 at UFC 309. He lost the fight via a guillotine choke submission in the first round. Jackson left his gloves in the octagon signaling his retirement from MMA competition.

== Personal life ==
Jackson is married and has four daughters.

== Championships and accomplishments ==
=== Mixed martial arts ===
- Ultimate Fighting Championship
  - Performance of the Night (Two times) vs. Mirsad Bektić and Pat Sabatini
  - UFC Honors Awards
    - 2020: Fan's Choice Comeback of the Year Nominee vs. Mirsad Bektić
- Legacy Fighting Championship
  - Legacy FC Featherweight Championship
- Legacy Fighting Alliance
  - Interim LFA Featherweight Championship
- MMAjunkie.com
  - 2020 September Submission of the Month vs. Mirsad Bektić

== Mixed martial arts record ==
Professional record breakdown
34 matches	23 wins	9 losses
By knockout	4	4
By submission	15	3
By decision	4	2
Draws	1	
No contests	1	

Res.	Record	Opponent	Method	Event	Date	Round	Time	Location	Notes
Loss	23–9–1 (1)	Carlos Calderon	Submission (rear-naked choke)	Fury FC 119	May 17, 2026	4	2:07	Houston, Texas, United States	For the vacant Fury FC Featherweight Championship.
Loss	23–8–1 (1)	Jim Miller	Submission (guillotine choke)	UFC 309	November 16, 2024	1	2:44	New York City, New York, United States	Lightweight bout.
Loss	23–7–1 (1)	Chepe Mariscal	Decision (unanimous)	UFC on ESPN: Tybura vs. Spivac 2	August 10, 2024	3	5:00	Las Vegas, Nevada, United States	Catchweight (149.5 lb) bout; Mariscal missed weight.
Win	23–6–1 (1)	Alexander Hernandez	Decision (split)	UFC Fight Night: Allen vs. Curtis 2	April 6, 2024	3	5:00	Las Vegas, Nevada, United States	Catchweight (147.5 lb) bout; Hernandez missed weight.
Loss	22–6–1 (1)	Billy Quarantillo	Decision (unanimous)	UFC on ESPN: Sandhagen vs. Font	August 5, 2023	3	5:00	Nashville, Tennessee, United States	
Loss	22–5–1 (1)	Dan Ige	KO (punch)	UFC Fight Night: Strickland vs. Imavov	January 14, 2023	2	4:13	Las Vegas, Nevada, United States	
Win	22–4–1 (1)	Pat Sabatini	TKO (punches)	UFC Fight Night: Sandhagen vs. Song	September 17, 2022	1	1:09	Las Vegas, Nevada, United States	Performance of the Night.
Win	21–4–1 (1)	Daniel Argueta	Decision (unanimous)	UFC Fight Night: Volkov vs. Rozenstruik	June 4, 2022	3	5:00	Las Vegas, Nevada, United States	
Win	20–4–1 (1)	Kamuela Kirk	Submission (arm-triangle choke)	UFC Fight Night: Santos vs. Ankalaev	March 12, 2022	2	4:42	Las Vegas, Nevada, United States	
Win	19–4–1 (1)	Charles Rosa	Decision (unanimous)	UFC Fight Night: Dern vs. Rodriguez	October 9, 2021	3	5:00	Las Vegas, Nevada, United States	
Loss	18–4–1 (1)	Ilia Topuria	KO (punches)	UFC on ESPN: Hermansson vs. Vettori	December 5, 2020	1	2:38	Las Vegas, Nevada, United States	
Win	18–3–1 (1)	Mirsad Bektić	Submission (guillotine choke)	UFC Fight Night: Covington vs. Woodley	September 19, 2020	3	1:21	Las Vegas, Nevada, United States	Performance of the Night.
Win	17–3–1 (1)	Mauro Chaulet	Submission (rear-naked choke)	LFA 83	March 6, 2020	1	2:11	Dallas, Texas, United States	
Loss	16–3–1 (1)	Movlid Khaybulaev	KO (flying knee)	PFL 2 (2019)	May 23, 2019	1	0:10	Uniondale, New York, United States	
Win	16–2–1 (1)	Nate Jennerman	KO (punch)	LFA 47	August 10, 2018	2	0:33	Dallas, Texas, United States	Won the interim LFA Featherweight Championship. Later promoted to undisputed champion.
Win	15–2–1 (1)	Jeremy Spoon	Submission (rear-naked choke)	LFA 40	May 25, 2018	2	3:59	Dallas, Texas, United States	Return to Featherweight.
Win	14–2–1 (1)	Chris Pecero	Technical Submission (arm-triangle choke)	LFA 33	February 16, 2018	1	0:38	Dallas, Texas, United States	
Win	13–2–1 (1)	Luis Luna	Submission (rear-naked choke)	LFA 28	December 8, 2017	1	4:58	Dallas, Texas, United States	Return to Lightweight.
Win	12–2–1 (1)	Eliazar Rodriguez	Submission (rear-naked choke)	LFA 16	July 14, 2017	1	3:49	Dallas, Texas, United States	
Loss	11–2–1 (1)	Kevin Aguilar	KO (punch)	LFA 4	February 17, 2017	3	4:05	Bossier City, Louisiana, United States	For the inaugural LFA Featherweight Championship.
Win	11–1–1 (1)	Charles Cheek III	Submission (rear-naked choke)	LFA 1	January 13, 2017	2	1:24	Dallas, Texas, United States	
Win	10–1–1 (1)	Levi Mowles	Decision (unanimous)	Legacy FC 61	October 14, 2016	3	5:00	Dallas, Texas, United States	
Draw	9–1–1 (1)	Levan Makashvili	Draw (majority)	UFC on Fox: Johnson vs. Bader	January 30, 2016	3	5:00	Newark, New Jersey, United States	Makashvili was deducted one point in round 3 due to an illegal knee and eye poke.
NC	9–1 (1)	Rony Jason	NC (overturned)	UFC Fight Night: Condit vs. Alves	May 30, 2015	1	3:31	Goiânia, Brazil	Originally a submission (triangle choke) win for Jason; overturned after he tested positive for a banned diuretic.
Loss	9–1	Yancy Medeiros	Submission (reverse bulldog choke)	UFC 177	August 30, 2014	2	1:54	Sacramento, California, United States	Lightweight bout.
Win	9–0	Leonard Garcia	Submission (arm-triangle choke)	Legacy FC 33	July 18, 2014	1	1:32	Allen, Texas, United States	Won the Legacy FC Featherweight Championship.
Win	8–0	Hunter Tucker	Submission (rear-naked choke)	Legacy FC 28	February 21, 2014	2	3:24	Arlington, Texas, United States	
Win	7–0	Javier Obregon	Submission (arm-triangle choke)	Legacy FC 24	October 11, 2013	2	4:12	Dallas, Texas, United States	Featherweight debut.
Win	6–0	Keith Miner	TKO (punches)	Bellator 96	June 19, 2013	1	2:00	Thackerville, Oklahoma, United States	
Win	5–0	Anselmo Luna	Submission (armbar)	24/7 Entertainment 9: Enemy of the State	April 19, 2013	2	1:15	Odessa, Texas, United States	
Win	4–0	Zac Church	Submission (rear-naked choke)	Bellator 86	January 24, 2013	2	2:43	Thackerville, Oklahoma, United States	
Win	3–0	Zac Church	Submission (rear-naked choke)	KOTC: Unification	December 8, 2012	2	3:19	Tulsa, Oklahoma, United States	
Win	2–0	Shelby Graham	Submission (rear-naked choke)	Tommy Tran Promotions	November 17, 2012	1	4:43	Branson, Missouri, United States	
Win	1–0	Jacob Salyer	TKO (punches)	War Sports 1	September 22, 2012	1	2:23	Springfield, Missouri, United States	Lightweight debut.

== See also ==
- List of male mixed martial artists
