= UFC on ESPN: Namajunas vs. Cortez =

Mixed martial arts event in 2024

- The poster for UFC on ESPN: Namajunas vs. Cortez
- Promotion: Ultimate Fighting Championship
- Date: July 13, 2024
- Venue: Ball Arena
- City: Denver, Colorado, United States
- Attendance: 16,884
- Total gate: $2,374,303

Event chronology
UFC 303: Pereira vs. Procházka 2	UFC on ESPN: Namajunas vs. Cortez	UFC on ESPN: Lemos vs. Jandiroba

UFC on ESPN: Namajunas vs. Cortez (also known as UFC on ESPN 59) was a mixed martial arts event produced by the Ultimate Fighting Championship that took place on July 13, 2024, at the Ball Arena in Denver, Colorado, United States.

== Background ==
The event marked the promotion's seventh visit to Denver and first since UFC Fight Night: The Korean Zombie vs. Rodríguez in November 2018.

A women's flyweight bout between former two-time UFC Women's Strawweight Champion Rose Namajunas and Maycee Barber was expected to headline the event. However, Barber withdrew from the bout, due to what was later revealed to be ongoing health problems, and was replaced by Tracy Cortez, who was scheduled to face Miranda Maverick one week later at UFC on ESPN: Lemos vs. Jandiroba.

Chris Duncan was scheduled to face Nazim Sadykhov in a lightweight bout. However, Duncan was replaced by Marquel Mederos due to undisclosed reasons. A week later, Mederos pulled out and the bout was scrapped.

A lightweight bout between Drew Dober and Mike Davis was expected to take place at this event. However, Davis was forced to withdraw due to a torn bicep. He was replaced by Jean Silva, who just fought two weeks earlier at UFC 303.

A welterweight bout between Mike Malott and Gilbert Urbina was scheduled to take place at this event. However, two weeks before the event, as a result of Urbina withdrawing due to undisclosed reasons, Malott decided not to fight another opponent at this event due to an injury sustained during training, so the bout was scrapped.

Viviane Araújo and Jasmine Jasudavicius were expected to meet in a women's flyweight bout. However on July 5, Araújo pulled out for unknown reasons and was replaced by promotional newcomer Fatima Kline.

== Results ==
Main card (ESPN / ESPN+)
Weight class				Method	Round	Time	Notes
Women's Flyweight	Rose Namajunas	def.	Tracy Cortez	Decision (unanimous) (49–46, 49–46, 48–47)	5	5:00
Welterweight	Muslim Salikhov	def.	Santiago Ponzinibbio	Decision (split) (28–29, 29–28, 29–28)	3	5:00
Lightweight	Jean Silva	def.	Drew Dober	TKO (doctor stoppage)	3	1:28
Welterweight	Gabriel Bonfim	def.	Ange Loosa	Decision (unanimous) (30–27, 30–27, 29–28)	3	5:00
Featherweight	Julian Erosa	def.	Christian Rodriguez	Submission (guillotine choke)	1	4:49
Middleweight	Abdul Razak Alhassan	vs.	Cody Brundage	No Contest (illegal elbows)	1	0:37	(Note: Accidental elbows to the back of the head rendered Brundage unable to continue.)
Preliminary card (ESPN / ESPN+)
Flyweight	Charles Johnson	def.	Joshua Van	KO (punches)	3	0:20
Women's Flyweight	Jasmine Jasudavicius	def.	Fatima Kline	Decision (unanimous) (30–27, 30–27, 30–27)	3	5:00
Bantamweight	Montel Jackson	def.	Da'Mon Blackshear	KO (punch)	1	0:18
Women's Flyweight	Luana Santos	def.	Mariya Agapova	Submission (rear-naked choke)	1	3:27
Middleweight	Andre Petroski	def.	Josh Fremd	Decision (unanimous) (30–27, 30–27, 30–27)	3	5:00
Welterweight	Evan Elder	def.	Darrius Flowers	Submission (arm-triangle choke)	2	1:46

== Bonus awards ==
The following fighters received $50,000 bonuses.

- Fight of the Night: Jean Silva vs. Drew Dober
- Performance of the Night: Charles Johnson and Montel Jackson

== See also ==
- 2024 in UFC
- List of current UFC fighters
- List of UFC events
