= Manon Fiorot =

French mixed martial artist

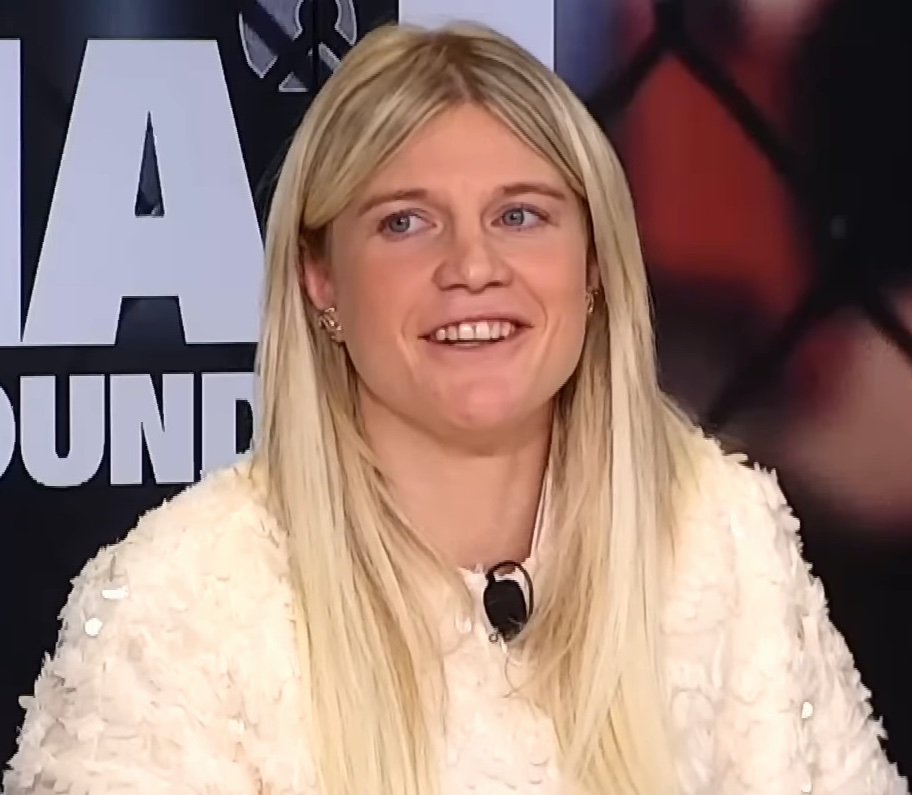
- Fiorot in 2023
- Born: Manon Caroline Fiorot; February 17, 1990 (age 36); Nice, Alpes-Maritimes, France
- Other names: The Beast
- Height: 5 ft 7 in (1.70 m)
- Weight: 125 lb (57 kg; 8 st 13 lb)
- Division: Flyweight
- Reach: 65 in (165 cm)
- Stance: Southpaw
- Fighting out of: Nice, France
- Team: Boxing Squad; Maccabi Nice
- Trainer: Aldric Cassata
- Rank: Black belt in Karate; Black belt in Brazilian Jiu-Jitsu
- Years active: 2018–present

Mixed martial arts record
- Total: 16
- Wins: 13
- By knockout: 7
- By decision: 6
- Losses: 3
- By decision: 3

Amateur record
- Total: 5
- Wins: 3
- By decision: 3
- Losses: 2
- By submission: 1
- By decision: 1

Other information
- Mixed martial arts record from Sherdog

Manon Caroline Fiorot (born February 17, 1990) is a French mixed martial artist, currently competing in the women's Flyweight division of the Ultimate Fighting Championship (UFC). As of September 12, 2026, is #4 in the Meta UFC women's flyweight rankings and as of September 15, 2026, she is #7 in the UFC women's pound-for-pound rankings.

== Early life ==
Manon Fiorot was born on February 17, 1990 in Nice, France. Her athletic career began at the age of seven with Karate. Later, she took up residence at a snowboarding school, and won the French Snowboarding Championship.

At age 18, Fiorot returned to karate and earned her black belt before joining the French national team. In 2014, she was selected for the Karate World Championships, but was seriously injured shortly thereafter. After recovering, she discovered kickboxing and Muay Thai in which she won several national competitions. In amateur Muay Thai, her record is 12 victories and 0 defeats, and she holds two national champion titles. Fiorot also won three national championship titles in K-1.

== Mixed martial arts career ==
=== Early career ===
In 2017, she participated in the IMMAF European Open Championships where she lost in the bantamweight final to the wrestling of Cornelia Holm. A few months later, she won the IMMAF World Championships.

On June 16, 2018, she fought professionally for the first time against Leah McCourt in the Cage Warriors promotion at Cage Warriors 94 and lost by split decision.

In 2019, she traveled to Johannesburg, South Africa to join a reality show called The Fighter organized by the Extreme Fighting Championship (EFC). After 2 months of competition, she won the reality show's contest and joined the EFC. In December 2019, she won against Amanda Lino, becoming the EFC Women's Flyweight World Champion.

After earning her title, she joined UAE Warriors, a professional promotion located in Abu Dhabi, United Arab Emirates. At UAE Warriors 12, she defeated Corinne Laframboise via TKO in round three. Fiorot defeated Naomi Tataroglu via TKO in the second round at UAE Warriors 13. At UAE 14, she defeated Gabriela Campos via TKO in the first round, capturing the UAEW Flyweight Championship.

=== Ultimate Fighting Championship ===
Fiorot made her UFC debut on January 20, 2021 at UFC on ESPN 20 against Victoria Leonardo. She won the fight via second-round technical knockout.

Fiorot was scheduled to face Maryna Moroz on June 5, 2021 at UFC Fight Night 189. However, Moroz was pulled from the event for undisclosed reasons, and she was replaced by Tabatha Ricci. Fiorot won the bout via standing TKO in the second round.

Fiorot was scheduled to face Mayra Bueno Silva on September 25, 2021 at UFC 266. However, the bout was postponed to UFC Fight Night: Ladd vs. Dumont due to COVID-19 protocols. Fiorot won the fight via unanimous decision.

As the first bout of her new multi-fight contract, Fiorot was scheduled to face Jessica Eye on March 5, 2022 at UFC 272. However, a week before the event, Eye withdrew due to injury and the bout was cancelled.

Fiorot faced Jennifer Maia vs on March 26, 2022 at UFC on ESPN 33. She won the fight by unanimous decision.

Fiorot was scheduled to face Katlyn Chookagian on September 3, 2022, at UFC Fight Night 209. However, Chookagian withdrew for unknown reasons in mid June and was replaced by former UFC Women's Strawweight Champion Jéssica Andrade. In turn, Andrade withdrew in mid July due to undisclosed reasons and was replaced by Fiorot's original opponent Chookagian. After Fiorot injured her knee, the bout was eventually shifted to take place at UFC 280 on October 22, 2022. At the weigh-ins, Chookagian weighed in at 127.5 pounds, 1.5 pounds over the flyweight non-title fight limit. Chookagian was fined 20% of her purse, which went to her opponent Fiorot. She won the fight by unanimous decision.

Fiorot faced former UFC Women's Strawweight champion Rose Namajunas on September 2, 2023 at UFC Fight Night 226 in Paris. The bout was Fiorot's first fight in her homeland and Namajunas' flyweight debut as a professional. She won the fight via unanimous decision.

Fiorot faced Erin Blanchfield on March 30, 2024, at UFC on ESPN 54. The fight was moved to the main event after Vicente Luque vs Sean Brady didn't materialize. She won the fight via unanimous decision.

Fiorot was the backup fighter for the UFC Women's Flyweight Championship trilogy bout between then-champion Alexa Grasso and Valentina Shevchenko on September 14, 2024 at UFC 306.

Fiorot competed for the UFC Women's Flyweight Championship against Valentina Shevchenko on May 10, 2025 at UFC 315. She lost the fight by unanimous decision.

Fiorot faced Jasmine Jasudavicius on October 18, 2025, at UFC Fight Night 262. She won the fight by technical knockout in the first round.

Fiorot faced former UFC Women's Flyweight Champion Alexa Grasso in a title eliminator on September 12, 2026 at UFC Fight Night 288. She lost the fight by unanimous decision.

Fiorot tested positive for ostarine on November 19, 2026, and was suspended for 3 months from the UFC. She will be eligible to compete on January 19, 2027.

== Championships and accomplishments ==
=== Mixed martial arts ===
- Ultimate Fighting Championship
  - Tied (Maycee Barber) for the third longest win streak in UFC Women's Flyweight division history (7) (behind Valentina Shevchenko)
  - Tied (Maycee Barber, Carli Judice & Casey O'Neill) for second most knockouts in UFC Women's Flyweight division history (3) (behind Valentina Shevchenko)
  - Second highest takedown defense percentage in UFC Women's Flyweight division history (87.5%) (behind Natália Silva)
  - UFC.com Awards
    - 2021: Ranked #2 Newcomer of the Year
- Extreme Fighting Championship
  - EFC Women's Flyweight World Championship (One time)
- UAE Warriors
  - UAEW Flyweight Championship (One time)

== Mixed martial arts record ==
Professional record breakdown
16 matches	13 wins	3 losses
By knockout	7	0
By decision	6	3

Res.	Record	Opponent	Method	Event	Date	Round	Time	Location	Notes
Loss	13–3	Alexa Grasso	Decision (unanimous)	UFC Fight Night: Silva vs. Delgado	September 12, 2026	3	5:00	Glendale, Arizona, United States	UFC Women's Flyweight title eliminator.
Win	13–2	Jasmine Jasudavicius	TKO (punches)	UFC Fight Night: de Ridder vs. Allen	October 18, 2025	1	1:14	Vancouver, British Columbia, Canada	
Loss	12–2	Valentina Shevchenko	Decision (unanimous)	UFC 315	May 10, 2025	5	5:00	Montreal, Quebec, Canada	For the UFC Women's Flyweight Championship.
Win	12–1	Erin Blanchfield	Decision (unanimous)	UFC on ESPN: Blanchfield vs. Fiorot	March 30, 2024	5	5:00	Atlantic City, New Jersey, United States	
Win	11–1	Rose Namajunas	Decision (unanimous)	UFC Fight Night: Gane vs. Spivac	September 2, 2023	3	5:00	Paris, France	
Win	10–1	Katlyn Chookagian	Decision (unanimous)	UFC 280	October 22, 2022	3	5:00	Abu Dhabi, United Arab Emirates	Catchweight (127.5 lb) bout; Chookagian missed weight.
Win	9–1	Jennifer Maia	Decision (unanimous)	UFC on ESPN: Blaydes vs. Daukaus	March 26, 2022	3	5:00	Columbus, Ohio, United States	
Win	8–1	Mayra Bueno Silva	Decision (unanimous)	UFC Fight Night: Ladd vs. Dumont	October 16, 2021	3	5:00	Las Vegas, Nevada, United States	
Win	7–1	Tabatha Ricci	TKO (punches)	UFC Fight Night: Rozenstruik vs. Sakai	June 5, 2021	2	3:00	Las Vegas, Nevada, United States	
Win	6–1	Victoria Leonardo	TKO (head kick and punches)	UFC on ESPN: Chiesa vs. Magny	January 20, 2021	2	4:08	Abu Dhabi, United Arab Emirates	
Win	5–1	Gabriela Campo	TKO (punches)	UAE Warriors 14	November 27, 2020	1	4:48	Abu Dhabi, United Arab Emirates	Won the inaugural UAE Warriors Women's Flyweight Championship.
Win	4–1	Naomi Tataroglu	TKO (punches)	UAE Warriors 13	September 25, 2020	2	3:00	Abu Dhabi, United Arab Emirates	
Win	3–1	Corinne Laframboise	TKO (punches)	UAE Warriors 12	July 31, 2020	3	1:52	Abu Dhabi, United Arab Emirates	
Win	2–1	Amanda Lino	Decision (unanimous)	EFC Worldwide 83	December 14, 2019	5	5:00	Pretoria, South Africa	Won the EFC Women's Flyweight Championship.
Win	1–1	Mellony Geugjes	TKO (punches)	EFC Worldwide 80	June 29, 2019	3	4:17	Johannesburg, South Africa	Flyweight debut.
Loss	0–1	Leah McCourt	Decision (split)	Cage Warriors 94	June 16, 2018	3	5:00	Antwerp, Belgium	Catchweight (138 lb) bout.

=== Exhibition record ===
Exhibition record breakdown		
2 matches	2 wins	0 losses
By knockout	1	0
By decision	1	0

Res.	Record	Opponent	Method	Event	Date	Round	Time	Location	Notes
Win	2–0	Cornelia Holm	Decision (unanimous)	The Fighter: Season 2	February 17, 2019	2	5:00	Paulshof, South Africa	
Win	1–0	Beckie Ainscough	TKO (punches)	The Fighter: Season 2	February 17, 2019	2	4:30	Paulshof, South Africa	

=== Amateur record ===
Amateur record breakdown		
5 matches	3 wins	2 losses
By submission	0	1
By decision	3	1

Res.	Record	Opponent	Method	Event	Date	Round	Time	Location	Notes
Win	3–2	Chamia Chabbi	Decision (unanimous)	2017 IMMAF World Championships: Finals	November 18, 2017	3	3:00	Manama, Bahrain	Final. Won the Women's Bantamweight Gold Medal.
Win	2–2	Karolina Hulkko	Decision (unanimous)	2017 IMMAF World Championships: Day 4, Cage 1	November 16, 2017	3	3:00	Manama, Bahrain	Semi-finals.
Loss	1–2	Cornelia Holm	Decision (unanimous)	2017 IMMAF European Open Championships: Finals	April 2, 2017	3	3:00	Sofia, Bulgaria	Final.
Win	1–1	EvaMy Persson	Decision (unanimous)	2017 IMMAF European Open Championships: Day 4	April 1, 2017	3	3:00	Sofia, Bulgaria	Semi-finals.
Loss	0–1	Camilla Mannes	Submission (rear-naked choke)	2016 IMMAF World Championships: Day 3, Cage 2	July 7, 2016	1	1:37	Las Vegas, Nevada, U.S.	Quarter-finals. Bantamweight debut.

== See also ==
- List of current UFC fighters
- List of female mixed martial artists
