= Jasmine Jasudavicius =

Canadian mixed martial artist

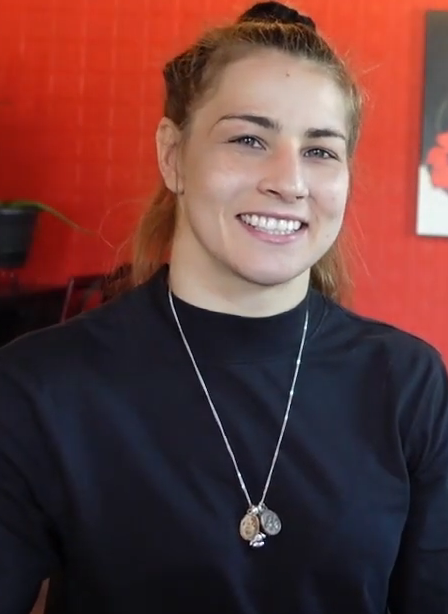
- Jasudavicius in 2023
- Born: March 1, 1989 (age 37); St. Catharines, Ontario, Canada
- Height: 5 ft 7 in (1.70 m)
- Weight: 125 lb (57 kg; 8 st 13 lb)
- Division: Flyweight (2019–present); Strawweight (2020)
- Reach: 68 in (173 cm)
- Fighting out of: St. Catharines, Ontario, Canada
- Team: Niagara Top Team (2016–present)
- Trainer: Chris Prickett
- Rank: Black belt in Brazilian Jiu-Jitsu
- Years active: 2019–present

Mixed martial arts record
- Total: 20
- Wins: 16
- By knockout: 2
- By submission: 4
- By decision: 10
- Losses: 4
- By knockout: 1
- By decision: 3

Amateur record
- Total: 4
- Wins: 4
- By knockout: 1
- By submission: 1
- By decision: 2

Other information
- Mixed martial arts record from Sherdog

Jasmine Jasudavicius (born March 1, 1989) is a Canadian mixed martial artist. She currently competes in the women's Flyweight division of the Ultimate Fighting Championship (UFC). As of October 17, 2026, she is #3 in the Meta UFC women's flyweight rankings and #12 in the UFC women’s pound-for-pound rankings.

== Background ==
Jasudavicius was born in 1989 in St. Catharines, Ontario, Canada to John and Rita Lianga. She grew up as the middle child with two other siblings. Although she was an athlete in her school days, her MMA career had a late start, beginning by chance, when she met Chris Pickett in 2016.

== Mixed martial arts career ==
=== Early career ===
Jasudavicius started fighting in amateur bouts in 2017 and soon amassed a record of 4 wins and no losses in amateur fights.

Jasudavicius started her professional career when she faced Brigid Chase on July 13, 2019 at WFC – World Fighting Championships 109. She won the fight via rear naked choke submission in round two.

She next faced Kylie O'Hearn on September 7, 2019 at Cage Titans: Combat Night 2. She won the fight via unanimous decision.

Jasudavicius faced Christina Ricker on November 30, 2019 at BTC 8: Eliminator. She won the fight via technical knockout in round one.

Jasudavicius faced Gabriella Gulfin on February 1, 2020 at CFFC 81. She won the fight via technical knockout in round one.

Jasudavicius faced Elise Reed on October 18, 2020 at CFFC 83 for the vacant Cage Fury Fighting Championships strawweight title. She lost the fight via split decision.

Jasudavicius next faced Ashley Deen on March 12, 2021 at CFFC 93. She won the fight via unanimous decision.

Jasudavicius was invited to face Julia Polastri on September 14, 2021 at Dana White's Contender Series 39, where she won the bout via unanimous decision and secured a UFC contract.

=== Ultimate Fighting Championship ===
In her promotional debut, Jasudavicius was scheduled to face Kay Hansen on January 15, 2022, at UFC on ESPN 32. However, the pairing was moved to UFC 270 on January 22, 2022, due to undisclosed reasons. She won the fight via unanimous decision.

Jasudavicius faced Natália Silva on June 18, 2022 at UFC on ESPN 37. She lost the fight via unanimous decision.

Jasudavicius was scheduled to face Cortney Casey on February 25, 2023 at UFC Fight Night 220. However, Casey withdrew from the event due to an undisclosed medical reason and was replaced by Gabriella Fernandes. She won the fight via unanimous decision.

Jasudavicius faced Miranda Maverick on June 10, 2023 at UFC 289. She won the fight via unanimous decision.

Jasudavicius faced Tracy Cortez on September 16, 2023 at UFC Fight Night 227. She lost the fight via unanimous decision.

Jasudavicius faced Priscila Cachoeira on January 20, 2024 at UFC 297. Originally set to be a flyweight bout, Cachoeira had trouble making weight after which the fight was changed to a bantamweight bout. Jasudavicius won the fight via anaconda choke submission in round three. The bout set a new UFC record for the biggest strike differential in a women's bout, by a margin of 326-26 total strikes. The win earned her the Performance of the Night award.

Jasudavicius was initially scheduled to face Viviane Araújo on July 13, 2024 at UFC on ESPN 59. However, on July 5, Araújo pulled out for unknown reasons and was replaced by promotional newcomer Fatima Kline. Jasudavicius won the fight via unanimous decision.

Jasudavicius faced Ariane da Silva on November 2, 2024 at UFC Fight Night 246. She won the fight via a brabo choke submission in the third round. This fight earned her another Performance of the Night award.

Jasudavicius faced former UFC Women's Bantamweight Championship challenger Mayra Bueno Silva on February 1, 2025 at UFC Fight Night 250. She won the fight by unanimous decision.

Jasudavicius faced former UFC Women's Strawweight Champion Jéssica Andrade on May 10, 2025 at UFC 315. She won the fight via a rear-naked choke submission in the first round. This fight earned her another Performance of the Night award.

Jasudavicius faced former UFC Women's Flyweight Championship challenger Manon Fiorot on October 18, 2025, at UFC Fight Night 262. She suffered the first stoppage loss of her career, losing the fight via technical knockout in the first round.

Jasudavicius faced Karine Silva on April 18, 2026 at UFC Fight Night 273. She won the fight by unanimous decision.

Jasudavicius was scheduled to face Erin Blanchfield on August 15, 2026 at UFC 330. However, Blanchfield withdrew due to injury and the bout was rescheduled for UFC Fight Night 291 which will take place on October 17, 2026. Jasudavicius won the fight by unanimous decision.

== Championships and accomplishments ==
=== Mixed martial arts ===
- Ultimate Fighting Championship
  - Performance of the Night (Three times) vs. Priscila Cachoeira, Ariane da Silva and Jéssica Andrade
  - Highest control time percentage in UFC Women's Flyweight division history (46.1%)
  - Second most control time in UFC Women's Flyweight division history (1:09:50) (behind Valentina Shevchenko)
  - Second highest top position percentage in UFC Women's Flyweight division history (behind Gillian Robertson) (37.8%)
  - Second most takedowns landed in UFC Women's Flyweight division history (28) (behind Valentina Shevchenko)
  - Tied (Valentina Shevchenko, Natália Silva & JJ Aldrich) for second most decision wins in UFC Flyweight division history (9)
  - Tied (Natália Silva & Maycee Barber) for third most wins in UFC Women's Flyweight division history (9)
  - Second lowest bottom position percentage in UFC Women's Flyweight division history (1.29%)
  - Second most top position time in UFC Women's Flyweight division history (57:09)
  - Largest total strike differential in a UFC Women's bout (326:26) (vs. Priscila Cachoeira)
- MMA Fighting
  - 2024 Second Team MMA All-Star

== Mixed martial arts record ==
Professional record breakdown
| 20 matches | 16 wins | 4 losses |
| By knockout | 2 | 1 |
| By submission | 4 | 0 |
| By decision | 10 | 3 |

| Res. | Record | Opponent | Method | Event | Date | Round | Time | Location | Notes |
|---|---|---|---|---|---|---|---|---|---|
| Win | 16–4 | Erin Blanchfield | Decision (unanimous) | UFC Fight Night: Buckley vs. Malott | October 17, 2026 | 3 | 5:00 | Edmonton, Alberta, Canada | |
| Win | 15–4 | Karine Silva | Decision (unanimous) | UFC Fight Night: Burns vs. Malott | April 18, 2026 | 3 | 5:00 | Winnipeg, Manitoba, Canada | |
| Loss | 14–4 | Manon Fiorot | TKO (punches) | UFC Fight Night: de Ridder vs. Allen | October 18, 2025 | 1 | 1:14 | Vancouver, British Columbia, Canada | |
| Win | 14–3 | Jéssica Andrade | Submission (rear-naked choke) | UFC 315 | May 10, 2025 | 1 | 2:40 | Montreal, Quebec, Canada | Performance of the Night. |
| Win | 13–3 | Mayra Bueno Silva | Decision (unanimous) | UFC Fight Night: Adesanya vs. Imavov | February 1, 2025 | 3 | 5:00 | Riyadh, Saudi Arabia | |
| Win | 12–3 | Ariane da Silva | Submission (brabo choke) | UFC Fight Night: Moreno vs. Albazi | November 2, 2024 | 3 | 2:28 | Edmonton, Alberta, Canada | Performance of the Night. |
| Win | 11–3 | Fatima Kline | Decision (unanimous) | UFC on ESPN: Namajunas vs. Cortez | July 13, 2024 | 3 | 5:00 | Denver, Colorado, United States | Return to Flyweight. |
| Win | 10–3 | Priscila Cachoeira | Submission (anaconda choke) | UFC 297 | January 20, 2024 | 3 | 4:21 | Toronto, Ontario, Canada | Bantamweight debut. Performance of the Night. |
| Loss | 9–3 | Tracy Cortez | Decision (unanimous) | UFC Fight Night: Grasso vs. Shevchenko 2 | September 16, 2023 | 3 | 5:00 | Las Vegas, Nevada, United States | |
| Win | 9–2 | Miranda Maverick | Decision (unanimous) | UFC 289 | June 10, 2023 | 3 | 5:00 | Vancouver, British Columbia, Canada | |
| Win | 8–2 | Gabriella Fernandes | Decision (unanimous) | UFC Fight Night: Muniz vs. Allen | February 25, 2023 | 3 | 5:00 | Las Vegas, Nevada, United States | |
| Loss | 7–2 | Natália Silva | Decision (unanimous) | UFC on ESPN: Kattar vs. Emmett | June 18, 2022 | 3 | 5:00 | Austin, Texas, United States | |
| Win | 7–1 | Kay Hansen | Decision (unanimous) | UFC 270 | January 22, 2022 | 3 | 5:00 | Anaheim, California, United States | |
| Win | 6–1 | Julia Polastri | Decision (unanimous) | Dana White's Contender Series 39 | September 14, 2021 | 3 | 5:00 | Las Vegas, Nevada, United States | |
| Win | 5–1 | Ashley Deen | Decision (unanimous) | Cage Fury FC 93 | March 12, 2021 | 3 | 5:00 | Philadelphia, Pennsylvania, United States | Return to Flyweight. |
| Loss | 4–1 | Elise Reed | Decision (split) | Cage Fury FC 83 | August 13, 2020 | 4 | 5:00 | Philadelphia, Pennsylvania, United States | Strawweight debut. For the vacant Cage Fury FC Strawweight Championship. |
| Win | 4–0 | Gabriella Gulfin | TKO (knees) | Cage Fury FC 81 | February 1, 2020 | 1 | 1:37 | Bensalem, Pennsylvania, United States | Catchweight (122 lb) bout. |
| Win | 3–0 | Christina Adcock | TKO (knees to the body) | BTC 8: Eliminator | November 30, 2019 | 1 | 0:52 | Niagara Falls, Ontario, Canada | |
| Win | 2–0 | Kylie O'Hearn | Decision (unanimous) | Cage Titans: Combat Night 2 | September 7, 2019 | 3 | 5:00 | Plymouth, Massachusetts, United States | |
| Win | 1–0 | Brigid Chase | Submission (rear-naked choke) | World FC 109 | July 13, 2019 | 2 | 1:17 | Pittsburgh, Pennsylvania, United States | Flyweight debut. |

== See also ==
- List of current UFC fighters
- List of Dana White's Contender Series alumni
- List of female mixed martial artists
- List of Canadian UFC fighters
