= Andrea Lee (fighter) =

American mixed martial artist (born 1989)

- Born: February 11, 1989 (age 37); Atlanta, Texas, U.S.
- Other names: KGB
- Height: 5 ft 7 in (1.70 m)
- Weight: 125 lb (57 kg; 8.9 st)
- Division: Flyweight
- Reach: 69 1/2 in (177 cm)
- Style: Kyokushin
- Team: Karate Mafia (2010–2018); Gladiators Academy (2018–present); Elite Combat Academy (2018–present)
- Trainer: Tim Credeur
- Rank: Black belt in Kyokushin; Brown belt in Judo; Brown belt in Brazilian Jiu-Jitsu under Relson Gracie; Kru in Muay Thai under Ajarn Buck Grant and Master Donny Aaron

Kickboxing record
- Total: 1
- Wins: 1

Mixed martial arts record
- Total: 24
- Wins: 13
- By knockout: 3
- By submission: 5
- By decision: 5
- Losses: 11
- By submission: 1
- By decision: 10

Other information
- Mixed martial arts record from Sherdog

Andrea Lee (born February 11, 1989) is an American kickboxer and mixed martial artist who competed in the flyweight division.

== Background ==
Lee's parents divorced when she was a toddler, and she ended up living with her mother who subsequently remarried. Lee grew up pentecostal on a farm in Atlanta, Texas, with two older brothers, an older sister and a younger brother. After graduating from Queen City High School, she moved to Shreveport, Louisiana, where she eventually dabbled in martial arts.

== Mixed martial arts career ==
=== Invicta FC & Legacy Fighting ===
Andrea Lee's first opponent in her Invicta FC debut was Shannon Sinn, a fight in which she won by unanimous decision. Andrea's next opponent was the more experienced Roxanne Modafferi, who defeated her in a close split decision. Lee bounced back by defeating Rachael Ostovich at Invicta FC 14: Evinger vs. Kianzad via armbar submission with seconds left in the fight. She was awarded the Performance of the Night bonus award.

Lee then fought for Legacy FC where she defeated Ariel Beck to become the Legacy FC Flyweight Champion. In 2016, Lee fought again for Invicta where she was submitted by Sarah D'Alelio. She was subsequently suspended for nine months due to a positive drug test for a diuretic.

Lee would make her return to Invicta at the beginning of 2017 with a quick knockout victory over Jenny Liou. The following month, she defeated Heather Bassett to become the inaugural LFA women's flyweight champion. Lee followed up with a decision win over Liz Tracy in Invicta and a successful LFA title defense over Jamie Thorton in her fourth fight of the year.

=== Ultimate Fighting Championship ===
In September 2017, Lee signed with the UFC initially to make her promotional debut just two weeks after her last fight. She was expected to face Kalindra Faria at UFC 216 but within hours of the bout announcement she was pulled from the card due to a clause in the UFC Anti Doping Policy which requires fighters with prior violations to serve a 6-month period in the testing pool prior to competing.

Lee faced Veronica Macedo on May 19, 2018, at UFC Fight Night 129. She won the fight by unanimous decision. This win earned her the Fight of the Night bonus.

Lee was expected to face Jessica-Rose Clark on December 15, 2018, at UFC on Fox 31. However, Clark was forced out of the bout as she was hospitalized due to weight cutting issue and deemed medically unfit to compete by UFC physicians. As a result, the bout was cancelled.

Lee faced Ashlee Evans-Smith on February 17, 2019, at UFC on ESPN 1. She won the fight by unanimous decision.

Lee faced Montana De La Rosa on June 22, 2019, at UFC Fight Night 154. She won the fight by unanimous decision.

With one bout left on her prevailing contract, Lee signed a new six-fight contract with the UFC. Lee faced Joanne Calderwood at September 9 at UFC 242. She lost the fight via split decision.

Lee faced Lauren Murphy on February 8, 2020, at UFC 247. She lost the fight via controversial split decision. 12 out of 12 MMA media outlets scored the contest for Lee with none scoring it for Murphy.

Lee faced Roxanne Modafferi on September 12, 2020, at UFC Fight Night 177. She lost the fight via unanimous decision.

Lee was scheduled to face Gillian Robertson on December 12, 2020, at UFC 256. However, Lee pulled out in early December due to a broken nose.

Lee faced Antonina Shevchenko on May 15, 2021, at UFC 262. She won the bout via triangle armbar at the end of the second round.

Lee was scheduled to face Jessica Eye on November 13, 2021, at UFC Fight Night 197. However, Eye pulled out of the bout in mid-October citing illness and was replaced by Cynthia Calvillo. Lee won the fight via technical knockout in round two. This win earned her the Performance of the Night award.

Lee faced Viviane Araújo on May 14, 2022, at UFC on ESPN 36. She lost the bout via unanimous decision.

Lee faced Maycee Barber on March 25, 2023, at UFC on ESPN 43. She lost the fight via controversial split decision. 9 of 17 media outlets scored the contest for Barber, while the other 8 scored it for Lee.

Lee faced Natália Silva at UFC 292 on August 19, 2023. She lost the fight by unanimous decision.

Lee faced Miranda Maverick on February 17, 2024, at UFC 298. Lee lost by unanimous decision.

Lee faced Montana De La Rosa in a rematch on June 8, 2024, at UFC on ESPN 57. She lost the fight by split decision.

Lee faced JJ Aldrich on March 1, 2025 at UFC Fight Night 253. She lost the fight by unanimous decision leading to the longest losing streak by a woman in UFC history with six straight losses.

On March 7, 2025, it was reported that Lee was removed from the UFC roster.

== Championships and awards ==
=== Mixed martial arts ===
- Ultimate Fighting Championship
  - Fight of the Night (One time) vs. Veronica Macedo
  - Performance of the night (One time) vs. Cynthia Calvillo
  - Tied (Katlyn Cerminara & Valentina Shevchenko) for most bouts in UFC Women's Flyweight division history (14)
    - Most decision bouts in UFC Women's Flyweight division history (12)
  - Third most total fight time in UFC Women's Flyweight division history (3:19:52)
  - Third most takedowns landed in UFC Women's Flyweight division history (22)
  - Third most significant strikes in UFC Women's Flyweight division history (924)
    - Fourth most total strikes landed in UFC Women's Flyweight division history (1193)
  - Tied (Jorge Masvidal, Clay Guida, Paul Felder, Cortney Casey & Angela Hill) for most split decision losses in UFC history (4)
  - Longest losing streak in UFC Women's history (6)
- Invicta Fighting Championships
  - Performance of the Night (one time) vs. Rachael Ostovich
- Legacy Fighting Alliance
  - 2017 – LFA Women's Flyweight Champion (inaugural)
    - One successful title defense
  - 2016 – Legacy FC professional women's flyweight Champion (inaugural)
  - 2014 – Legacy FC Amateur Flyweight Champion (inaugural)
- Ascend Combat
  - 2013 – Ascend Combat Amateur Flyweight Champion

=== Kickboxing ===
- 2014 – International Kickboxing Federation (IKF) World Classic Amateur Featherweight Muay Thai Champion
- 2014 – TBA Amateur World Open Lightweight Muay Thai Champion
- 2014 – WKA Amateur North American Kickboxing Champion
- 2014 – WKA Amateur North American Muay Thai Champion
- 2013 – International Kickboxing Federation (IKF) World Classic Amateur Muay Thai Champion

=== Boxing ===
- 2013 – Amateur National Golden Gloves Champion
- 2013 – Louisiana State Golden Gloves Champion
- 2010 – Louisiana State Golden Gloves Champion

== Personal life ==
Lee's moniker, KGB, was given by her coach as he thought she looked Russian. On one occasion at the Muay Thai World Championships, where Lee secured a victory, the entire Russian team approached her to have pictures taken due to the "KGB" patch on her trunks.

A police report was filed on August 5, 2018, concerning an abuse by Lee's husband, Donny Aaron. Aaron, who created controversy with his Nazi tattoos, was arrested and jailed on May 30, 2019, after nine months on the run, for domestic violence and false imprisonment after burning Andrea with a cigarette and choking her.

Lee has a daughter from her relationship with Aaron.

== Mixed martial arts record ==
Professional record breakdown
24 matches	13 wins	11 losses
By knockout	3	0
By submission	5	1
By decision	5	10

Res.	Record	Opponent	Method	Event	Date	Round	Time	Location	Notes
Loss	13–11	JJ Aldrich	Decision (unanimous)	UFC Fight Night: Kape vs. Almabayev	March 1, 2025	3	5:00	Las Vegas, Nevada, United States	
Loss	13–10	Montana De La Rosa	Decision (split)	UFC on ESPN: Cannonier vs. Imavov	June 8, 2024	3	5:00	Louisville, Kentucky, United States	
Loss	13–9	Miranda Maverick	Decision (unanimous)	UFC 298	February 17, 2024	3	5:00	Anaheim, California, United States	
Loss	13–8	Natália Silva	Decision (unanimous)	UFC 292	August 19, 2023	3	5:00	Boston, Massachusetts, United States	
Loss	13–7	Maycee Barber	Decision (split)	UFC on ESPN: Vera vs. Sandhagen	March 25, 2023	3	5:00	San Antonio, Texas, United States	
Loss	13–6	Viviane Araújo	Decision (unanimous)	UFC on ESPN: Błachowicz vs. Rakić	May 14, 2022	3	5:00	Las Vegas, Nevada, United States	
Win	13–5	Cynthia Calvillo	TKO (corner stoppage)	UFC Fight Night: Holloway vs. Rodríguez	November 13, 2021	2	5:00	Las Vegas, Nevada, United States	Performance of the Night.
Win	12–5	Antonina Shevchenko	Submission (triangle armbar)	UFC 262	May 15, 2021	2	4:52	Houston, Texas, United States	
Loss	11–5	Roxanne Modafferi	Decision (unanimous)	UFC Fight Night: Waterson vs. Hill	September 12, 2020	3	5:00	Las Vegas, Nevada, United States	
Loss	11–4	Lauren Murphy	Decision (split)	UFC 247	February 8, 2020	3	5:00	Houston, Texas, United States	
Loss	11–3	Joanne Calderwood	Decision (split)	UFC 242	September 7, 2019	3	5:00	Abu Dhabi, United Arab Emirates	
Win	11–2	Montana De La Rosa	Decision (unanimous)	UFC Fight Night: Moicano vs. The Korean Zombie	June 22, 2019	3	5:00	Greenville, South Carolina, United States	
Win	10–2	Ashlee Evans-Smith	Decision (unanimous)	UFC on ESPN: Ngannou vs. Velasquez	February 17, 2019	3	5:00	Phoenix, Arizona, United States	
Win	9–2	Veronica Macedo	Decision (unanimous)	UFC Fight Night: Maia vs. Usman	May 19, 2018	3	5:00	Santiago, Chile	Fight of the Night.
Win	8–2	Jamie Thorton	Submission (kimura)	LFA 23	September 22, 2017	2	2:54	Bossier City, Louisiana, United States	Defended the LFA Women's Flyweight Championship.
Win	7–2	Liz Tracy	Decision (split)	Invicta FC 23	May 20, 2017	3	5:00	Kansas City, Missouri, United States	
Win	6–2	Heather Bassett	Submission (armbar)	LFA 4	February 17, 2017	3	3:40	Bossier City, Louisiana, United States	Won the inaugural LFA Women's Flyweight Championship.
Win	5–2	Jenny Liou	KO (punches)	Invicta FC 21	January 14, 2017	1	1:14	Kansas City, Missouri, United States	
Loss	4–2	Sarah D'Alelio	Submission (rear-naked choke)	Invicta FC 16	March 11, 2016	3	4:21	Las Vegas, Nevada, United States	Lee tested positive for a banned diuretic.
Win	4–1	Ariel Beck	Submission (armbar)	Legacy FC 49	December 4, 2015	3	4:22	Bossier City, Louisiana, United States	Won the vacant Legacy FC Women's Flyweight Championship.
Win	3–1	Rachael Ostovich	Verbal Submission (armbar)	Invicta FC 14	September 12, 2015	3	4:58	Kansas City, Missouri, United States	Performance of the Night.
Loss	2–1	Roxanne Modafferi	Decision (split)	Invicta FC 10	December 5, 2014	3	5:00	Houston, Texas, United States	
Win	2–0	Shannon Sinn	Decision (unanimous)	Invicta FC 9	November 1, 2014	3	5:00	Davenport, Iowa, United States	
Win	1–0	Kim Colbert	TKO (doctor stoppage)	Global Fighting Alliance 27	September 19, 2014	1	0:10	Bossier City, Louisiana, United States	Flyweight debut.

== See also ==
- List of female mixed martial artists
