= UFC Fight Night: Adesanya vs. Imavov =

2025 mixed martial event in Saudi Arabia

- The poster for UFC Fight Night: Adesanya vs. Imavov
- Promotion: Ultimate Fighting Championship
- Date: February 1, 2025
- Venue: anb Arena
- City: Riyadh, Saudi Arabia
- Attendance: Not announced

Event chronology
UFC 311: Makhachev vs. Moicano	UFC Fight Night: Adesanya vs. Imavov	UFC 312: du Plessis vs Strickland 2

UFC Fight Night: Adesanya vs. Imavov (also known as UFC Fight Night 250 and UFC on ESPN+ 108) was a mixed martial arts event produced by the Ultimate Fighting Championship that took place on February 1, 2025, at the anb Arena in Riyadh, Saudi Arabia.

== Background ==
The event marked the promotion's second visit to Riyadh and first since UFC on ABC: Whittaker vs. Aliskerov in June 2024.

A middleweight bout between former two-time UFC Middleweight Champion Israel Adesanya and Nassourdine Imavov headlined this event.

A middleweight bout between Ikram Aliskerov and André Muniz was expected to take place at the event. The pair was originally scheduled to compete at UFC on ESPN: Perez vs. Taira in June 2024, but Muniz withdrew from the bout after he suffered a foot fracture. In turn, the bout was cancelled once again and was rescheduled for UFC on ESPN: Hill vs. Rountree Jr. as Muniz and his team had visa issues.

A lightweight bout between Jordan Leavitt and Abdul-Kareem Al-Selwady was scheduled for this event. However, Leavitt withdrew for unknown reasons and was replaced by Bolaji Oki. In turn, one week prior to the event, Oki withdrew from the fight for unknown reasons, so the bout was subsequently cancelled.

A lightweight rematch between former KSW Lightweight and Featherweight Champion Mateusz Gamrot and Rafael Fiziev was reportedly linked to this event. They previously headlined UFC Fight Night: Fiziev vs. Gamrot in September 2023, where Gamrot won due to an injury. However, the bout was never officially scheduled for the card.

At the weigh-ins, Lucas Alexander weighed in at 148.5 pounds, two and a half pounds over the featherweight non-title fight limit. The bout proceeded at catchweight with Alexander forfeiting 30% of his purse which went to his opponent Bogdan Grad.

== Results ==
Main card (ESPN+)
Weight class				Method	Round	Time	Notes
Middleweight	Nassourdine Imavov	def.	Israel Adesanya	TKO (punches)	2	0:30
Middleweight	Michael Page	def.	Sharabutdin Magomedov	Decision (unanimous) (30–27, 30–27, 29–28)	3	5:00
Heavyweight	Sergei Pavlovich	def.	Jairzinho Rozenstruik	Decision (unanimous) (30–27, 30–27, 30–27)	3	5:00
Bantamweight	Vinicius Oliveira	def.	Said Nurmagomedov	Decision (unanimous) (29–28, 29–28, 29–28)	3	5:00
Lightweight	Farès Ziam	def.	Mike Davis	Decision (unanimous) (30–27, 30–27, 30–27)	3	5:00
Preliminary card (ESPN+)
Featherweight	Muhammad Naimov	def.	Kaan Ofli	Decision (unanimous) (30-27, 30-27, 29-28)	3	5:00
Heavyweight	Shamil Gaziev	def.	Thomas Petersen	TKO (punch)	1	3:12
Lightweight	Terrance McKinney	def.	Damir Hadžović	TKO (punches)	1	2:01
Women's Flyweight	Jasmine Jasudavicius	def.	Mayra Bueno Silva	Decision (unanimous) (30–27, 30–27, 30–27)	3	5:00
Catchweight (148.5 lb)	Bogdan Grad	def.	Lucas Alexander	TKO (elbows and punches)	2	4:22
Heavyweight	Hamdy Abdelwahab	def.	Jamal Pogues	Decision (split) (27–30, 29–28, 29–28)	3	5:00

== Bonus awards ==
The following fighters received $50,000 bonuses.

- Fight of the Night: Vinicius Oliveira vs. Said Nurmagomedov
- Performance of the Night: Nassourdine Imavov and Bogdan Grad

== See also ==
- 2025 in UFC
- List of current UFC fighters
- List of UFC events
- Riyadh Season
