= Montana De La Rosa =

American mixed martial artist

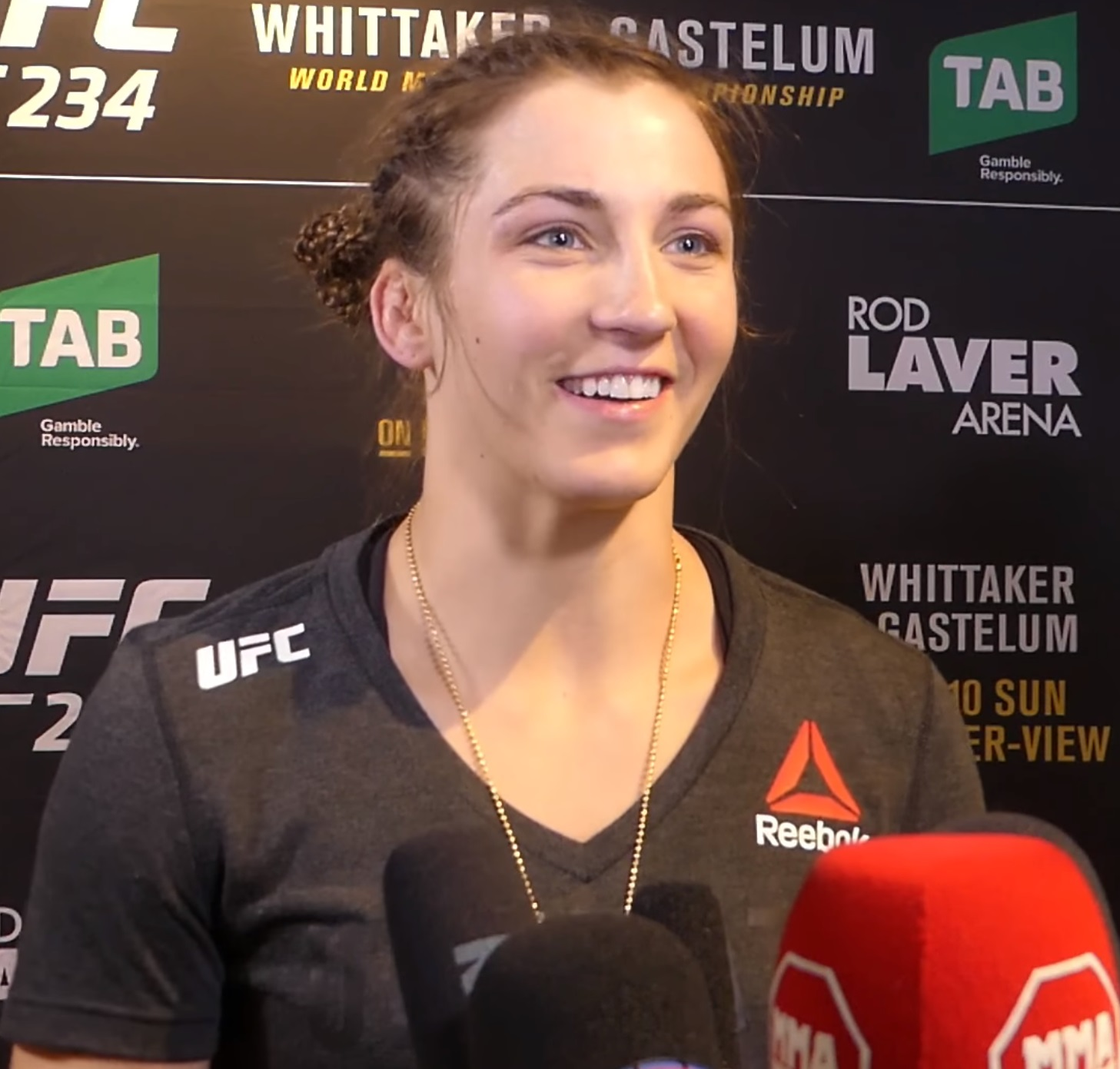
- Montana De La Rosa interviewed at UFC 234 in 2019
- Born: Montana Stewart; February 14, 1995 (age 31); Helena, Montana, United States
- Other names: Monty
- Height: 5 ft 7 in (1.70 m)
- Weight: 125 lb (57 kg; 8 st 13 lb)
- Division: Strawweight; Flyweight
- Reach: 68 in (173 cm)
- Fighting out of: Fort Worth, Texas, United States
- Team: Genesis Jiu Jitsu Azle; Team Takedown (2014–2020); Team Elevation (2020–present)
- Rank: Brown belt in Brazilian Jiu-Jitsu
- Years active: 2014–present

Mixed martial arts record
- Total: 24
- Wins: 13
- By knockout: 1
- By submission: 8
- By decision: 4
- Losses: 10
- By knockout: 1
- By submission: 2
- By decision: 7
- Draws: 1

Other information
- University: Tarrant County College
- Spouse: Mark De La Rosa
- Mixed martial arts record from Sherdog

Montana De La Rosa (née Stewart) (born February 14, 1995) is an American mixed martial artist (MMA) who competes in the Flyweight division of the Professional Fighters League (PFL). She has also competed in the Ultimate Fighting Championship (UFC).

== Background ==
De La Rosa was born in Helena, Montana, United States, but grew up in Azle, Texas. She started training in wrestling at Azle High School and after faring well in both state and national competition she was offered a scholarship to Oklahoma City University. However, as a teenage mom she quickly transferred back to Texas where she attends Tarrant County College, majoring in kinesiology, De La Rosa started training Brazilian jiu-jitsu after she graduated in 2013 and later transitioned to MMA.

== Mixed martial arts career ==
=== Early career ===
De La Rosa started her professional MMA career in 2014. She was the formal Xtreme Fighting League (XFN) flyweight champion and amassed a record of 7–4 prior participated in The Ultimate Fighter 26 UFC TV MMA competition series which she was subsequently signed by UFC after the show.

=== The Ultimate Fighter ===
In August 2017, it was announced that De La Rosa was one of the fighters featured on The Ultimate Fighter 26, UFC TV series, where the process to crown the UFC's inaugural 125-pound women's champion will take place. In the opening round, De La Rosa faced Ariel Beck and she won the fight D'Arce choke in round one. In the quarterfinals, she faced Nicco Montaño and lost the bout via unanimous decision.

=== Ultimate Fighting Championship ===
De La Rosa made her UFC debut on December 1, 2017, on The Ultimate Fighter 26 Finale against Christina Marks. She won the fight via a submission in round one.

Her next fight came on July 6, 2018, at The Ultimate Fighter 27 Finale against Rachael Ostovich. She won the fight via a rear-naked choke in round three.

On February 10, 2019, De La Rosa faced Nadia Kassem at UFC 234. She won the fight via a submission in round two. The win earned her the Performance of the Night bonus.

De La Rosa faced Andrea Lee on June 22, 2019, at UFC Fight Night 154. She lost the fight by unanimous decision.

De La Rosa faced Mara Romero Borella on February 15, 2020, at UFC Fight Night 167. She won the fight via unanimous decision.

De La Rosa was scheduled to face Maryna Moroz on September 5, 2020, at UFC Fight Night 176. However, Moroz was forced to withdraw from the event due to visa issues and she was replaced by Viviane Araújo. De La Rosa lost the fight via unanimous decision.

De La Rosa was scheduled to face Taila Santos, replacing Maryna Moroz, on December 5, 2020, at UFC on ESPN 19. However, the fight was removed from the event after one of De La Rosa's cornermen tested positive for COVID-19.

De La Rosa faced Mayra Bueno Silva on February 27, 2021, at UFC Fight Night 186. After three rounds of fighting, the fight ended with a draw from the judges.

De La Rosa faced Ariane Lipski on June 5, 2021, at UFC Fight Night: Rozenstruik vs. Sakai. She won via TKO in the second round, the first of her career.

De La Rosa was expected to face Maycee Barber on December 11, 2021, at UFC 269. However, De La Rosa pulled out of the fight in early October citing injury. While not officially confirmed by the promotion, officials are expected to leave the matchup intact and reschedule it for a future event.

De La Rosa faced Maycee Barber on April 23, 2022, at UFC Fight Night 205. She lost the fight via unanimous decision.

De La Rosa faced Tatiana Suarez on February 25, 2023, at UFC Fight Night 220. She lost the fight via a submission in round two.

De La Rosa was scheduled to face Stephanie Egger at UFC Fight Night 229 on October 7, 2023. However, Egger pulled out for undisclosed reasons and was replaced by JJ Aldrich. De La Rosa lost the fight via unanimous decision.

De La Rosa faced Andrea Lee in a rematch on June 8, 2024, at UFC on ESPN 57. She won the fight by split decision.

De La Rosa was scheduled to face Luana Carolina on March 1, 2025 at UFC Fight Night 253. However, the bout was scrapped as a result of Carolina's botched weight cut.

On March 20, 2025, it was reported that De La Rosa was removed from the UFC roster.

=== Professional Fighters League ===
On December 2, 2025, it was announced that De La Rosa signed with the PFL.

De La Rosa made her PFL debut against Tatiana Postarnakova on July 31, 2026, at PFL New York. She lost the bout via split decision.

== Professional grappling career ==
De La Rosa competed against Gillian Robertson in the main event of Pit Submission Series 3 on March 23, 2024. She lost by unanimous decision.

== Personal life ==
De La Rosa is married to Mark De La Rosa, who was also a UFC fighter. Montana has a daughter from a previous relationship.

== Championships and accomplishments ==
=== Mixed martial arts ===
- Ultimate Fighting Championship
  - Performance of the Night (One time) vs. Nadia Kassem
  - Tied (Karine Silva) for third most submissions in UFC Women's Flyweight division history (3)
  - Tied (Erin Blanchfield) for fourth most finishes in UFC Women's Flyweight division history (4)
- Xtreme Fighting League
  - Xtreme Fighting League Flyweight Championship (One time) vs. Kathina Lowe

=== Wrestling ===
- High school wrestling
  - All-American (Three times)

== Mixed martial arts record ==
Professional record breakdown
24 matches	13 wins	10 losses
By knockout	1	1
By submission	8	2
By decision	4	7
Draws	1	

Res.	Record	Opponent	Method	Event	Date	Round	Time	Location	Notes
Loss	13–10–1	Tatiana Postarnakova	Decision (split)	PFL New York: Nurmagomedov vs. Colgan	July 31, 2026	3	5:00	Elmont, New York, United States	
Win	13–9–1	Andrea Lee	Decision (split)	UFC on ESPN: Cannonier vs. Imavov	June 8, 2024	3	5:00	Louisville, Kentucky, United States	
Loss	12–9–1	JJ Aldrich	Decision (unanimous)	UFC Fight Night: Dawson vs. Green	October 7, 2023	3	5:00	Las Vegas, Nevada, United States	
Loss	12–8–1	Tatiana Suarez	Submission (guillotine choke)	UFC Fight Night: Muniz vs. Allen	February 25, 2023	2	2:51	Las Vegas, Nevada, United States	
Loss	12–7–1	Maycee Barber	Decision (unanimous)	UFC Fight Night: Lemos vs. Andrade	April 23, 2022	3	5:00	Las Vegas, Nevada, United States	
Win	12–6–1	Ariane Lipski	TKO (punches)	UFC Fight Night: Rozenstruik vs. Sakai	June 5, 2021	2	4:27	Las Vegas, Nevada, United States	
Draw	11–6–1	Mayra Bueno Silva	Draw (majority)	UFC Fight Night: Rozenstruik vs. Gane	February 27, 2021	3	5:00	Las Vegas, Nevada, United States	Silva was deducted one point in round 1 for grabbing the fence.
Loss	11–6	Viviane Araújo	Decision (unanimous)	UFC Fight Night: Overeem vs. Sakai	September 5, 2020	3	5:00	Las Vegas, Nevada, United States	
Win	11–5	Mara Romero Borella	Decision (unanimous)	UFC Fight Night: Anderson vs. Błachowicz 2	February 15, 2020	3	5:00	Rio Rancho, New Mexico, United States	
Loss	10–5	Andrea Lee	Decision (unanimous)	UFC Fight Night: Moicano vs. The Korean Zombie	June 22, 2019	3	5:00	Greenville, South Carolina, United States	
Win	10–4	Nadia Kassem	Submission (armbar)	UFC 234	February 10, 2019	2	2:37	Melbourne, Australia	Performance of the Night.
Win	9–4	Rachael Ostovich	Submission (rear-naked choke)	The Ultimate Fighter: Undefeated Finale	July 6, 2018	3	4:21	Las Vegas, Nevada, United States	
Win	8–4	Christina Marks	Submission (armbar)	The Ultimate Fighter: A New World Champion Finale	December 1, 2017	1	2:00	Las Vegas, Nevada, United States	Return to Flyweight.
Win	7–4	Kathina Lowe	Submission (armbar)	Xtreme Fight Night 342	June 16, 2017	3	2:03	Tulsa, Oklahoma, United States	
Loss	6–4	Cynthia Calvillo	TKO (punches)	LFA 1	January 13, 2017	3	2:54	Dallas, Texas, United States	
Loss	6–3	Mackenzie Dern	Submission (rear-naked choke)	Legacy FC 61	October 14, 2016	1	3:25	Dallas, Texas, United States	Catchweight (118.8 lb) bout; Dern missed weight.
Win	6–2	Miki Rogers	Decision (unanimous)	Xtreme Fight Night 335	September 17, 2016	3	5:00	Grant, Oklahoma, United States	Catchweight (117 lb) bout; De La Rosa missed weight.
Win	5–2	Mellony Geugjes	Decision (unanimous)	SCC 13	June 3, 2016	3	3:00	Fort Worth, Texas, United States	Strawweight debut.
Win	4–2	Francis Hernandez	Submission (rear-naked choke)	Xtreme Fight Night	May 21, 2016	3	1:58	Grant, Oklahoma, United States	
Win	3–2	Katie Ross Scharmer	Submission (rear-naked choke)	Savage Entertainment: Oktoberfist 4	October 17, 2015	2	2:41	Savage, Minnesota, United States	
Win	2–2	Roxanne Ceasear	Submission (armbar)	Premier Fight Series 4	June 13, 2015	2	1:55	Midland, Texas, United States	
Win	1–2	Colby Fletcher	Submission (armbar)	Xtreme Fight Night: Rumble on The River 12	March 20, 2015	1	1:03	Tulsa, Oklahoma, United States	
Loss	0–2	Maylene Estudillo	Decision (unanimous)	Rocks Xtreme MMA 11	January 10, 2015	3	3:00	Corpus Christi, Texas, United States	Catchweight (120 lb) bout.
Loss	0–1	Jazmin Quezada	Decision (split)	24/7 Entertainment 16 & 17	September 6, 2014	3	3:00	Midland, Texas, United States	Flyweight debut.

=== Mixed martial arts exhibition record ===
Exhibition record breakdown		
2 matches	1 win	1 loss
By submission	1	0
By decision	0	1

Res.	Record	Opponent	Method	Event	Date	Round	Time	Location	Notes
Loss	1–1	Nicco Montaño	Decision (unanimous)	The Ultimate Fighter: A New World Champion	November 15, 2017 (airdate)	2	5:00	Las Vegas, Nevada, United States	Quarter-finals.
Win	1–0	Ariel Beck	Submission (D'Arce choke)	The Ultimate Fighter: A New World Champion	September 13, 2017 (airdate)	1	2:52	Las Vegas, Nevada, United States	Round of 16.

== See also ==
- List of female mixed martial artists
- List of current PFL fighters
