= UFC on ESPN: Holm vs. Bueno Silva =

2023 mixed martial arts event

- The poster for UFC on ESPN: Holm vs. Bueno Silva
- Promotion: Ultimate Fighting Championship
- Date: July 15, 2023
- Venue: UFC Apex
- City: Enterprise, Nevada, United States
- Attendance: Not announced

Event chronology
UFC 290: Volkanovski vs. Rodríguez	UFC on ESPN: Holm vs. Bueno Silva	UFC Fight Night: Aspinall vs. Tybura

UFC on ESPN: Holm vs. Bueno Silva (also known as UFC on ESPN 49 and UFC Vegas 77) was a mixed martial arts event produced by the Ultimate Fighting Championship that took place on July 15, 2023, at the UFC Apex facility in Enterprise, Nevada, part of the Las Vegas Metropolitan Area, United States.

== Background ==
A women's bantamweight bout between former UFC Women's Bantamweight Champion Holly Holm and Mayra Bueno Silva headlined the event.

A welterweight bout between former UFC Lightweight Champion Rafael dos Anjos and Vicente Luque was briefly rumored to headline the event before the announcement of the Holm/Bueno Silva bout. However, the pair was moved to UFC on ESPN: Luque vs. dos Anjos for unknown reasons and headlined that event.

Jafel Filho and Juancamilo Ronderos were expected to meet in a flyweight bout at this event. However, Ronderos withdrew due to undisclosed reasons and Filho was rescheduled against promotional newcomer Daniel Bárez at UFC Fight Night: Aspinall vs. Tybura a week later.

A heavyweight bout between Walt Harris and Josh Parisian was expected to take place at the event. However, the bout was scrapped by USADA due to a potential anti-doping policy violation by Harris.

== Results ==
Main Card (ESPN / ESPN+)
Weight class				Method	Round	Time	Notes
Women's Bantamweight	Holly Holm	vs.	Mayra Bueno Silva	No Contest (overturned)	2	0:38	(Note: Originally a submission (ninja choke) win for Bueno Silva; overturned after she tested positive for ritalinic acid.)
Welterweight	Jack Della Maddalena	def.	Bassil Hafez	Decision (split) (28–29, 29–28, 29–28)	3	5:00
Lightweight	Francisco Prado	def.	Ottman Azaitar	TKO (punches)	1	4:05
Middleweight	Park Jun-yong	def.	Albert Duraev	Submission (rear-naked choke)	2	4:45
Women's Featherweight	Norma Dumont	def.	Chelsea Chandler	Decision (unanimous) (30–27, 30–27, 30–27)	3	5:00
Lightweight	Nazim Sadykhov	def.	Terrance McKinney	Submission (rear-naked choke)	2	1:07
Preliminary card (ESPN / ESPN+)
Featherweight	Melsik Baghdasaryan	def.	Tucker Lutz	Decision (unanimous) (29–28, 29–28, 29–28)	3	5:00
Women's Strawweight	Viktoriya Dudakova	def.	Istela Nunes	TKO (arm injury)	1	0:34
Featherweight	Melquizael Costa	def.	Austin Lingo	Decision (unanimous) (30–26, 30–27, 30–27)	3	5:00
Lightweight	Evan Elder	def.	Genaro Valdez	Decision (unanimous) (30–26, 29–28, 29–28)	3	5:00
Flyweight	Azat Maksum	def.	Tyson Nam	Decision (split) (29–28, 28–29, 29–28)	3	5:00
Lightweight	Alexander Munoz	def.	Carl Deaton III	Decision (unanimous) (30–26, 30–27, 29–28)	3	5:00
Women's Bantamweight	Ailín Pérez	def.	Ashlee Evans-Smith	Decision (unanimous) (30–25, 30–25, 30–26)	3	5:00

== Bonus awards ==
The following fighters received $50,000 bonuses.

- Fight of the Night: Jack Della Maddalena vs. Bassil Hafez
- Performance of the Night: Mayra Bueno Silva and Francisco Prado

== Aftermath ==
On August 21, Bueno Silva announced that she tested positive for a substance that is consistent with the prescription medication she takes for attention deficit hyperactivity disorder. A disciplinary hearing was scheduled at the Nevada State Athletic Commission's monthly meeting on August 24. On October 17, the bout was overturned to a no contest after the NSAC fined and suspended Bueno Silva for four and a half months due to testing positive for ritalinic acid.

== See also ==
- List of UFC events
- List of current UFC fighters
- 2023 in UFC
