= Dana White's Contender Series season 5 =

UFC mixed martial arts event in 2021

Dana White's Contender Series
- Season 5

Release
- Original network: ESPN+
- Original release: August 31 – November 2, 2021

Season chronology
- ← Previous; Season 4 Next → Season 6

Season 5 of Dana White's Contender Series commenced in August 2021 and in the US would be exclusive to ESPN+, ESPN's new over-the-top subscription package.

== Week 1 - August 31 ==
Dana White's Contender Series 37
- Promotion: DWCS
- Date: August 31, 2021
- Venue: UFC Apex Centre
- City: Las Vegas, Nevada, United States

Main Card
Weight class				Method	Round	Time	Notes
Light Heavyweight	Azamat Murzakanov	def.	Matheus Scheffel	TKO (punches)	1	3:00
Featherweight	Joanderson Brito	def.	Diego Lopes	Technical Decision (unanimous) (29–28, 29–28, 29–28)	3	0:10	(Note: Brito was deducted one point in round 3 due to an eye poke which rendered Lopes unable to continue.)
Flyweight	Victor Altamirano	def.	Carlos Candelario	Decision (split) (29–28, 28–29, 29–28)	3	5:00
Welterweight	AJ Fletcher	def.	Leonardo Damiani	KO (flying knee)	1	2:24

=== Contract awards ===
The following fighters were awarded contracts with the UFC:

- Azamat Murzakanov, Joanderson Brito, Victor Altamirano, Carlos Candelario, and AJ Fletcher

== Week 2 - September 7 ==
Dana White's Contender Series 38
- Promotion: DWCS
- Date: September 7, 2021
- Venue: UFC Apex Centre
- City: Las Vegas, Nevada, United States

Main Card
Weight class				Method	Round	Time	Notes
Welterweight	Josh Quinlan	vs.	Logan Urban	NC (overturned)	1	0:47	(Note: Original a KO (punches) win for Quinlan; overturned following Quinlan failing a drug test.)
Middleweight	Chidi Njokuani	def.	Mario Sousa	TKO (elbows)	3	1:35
Bantamweight	Saimon Oliveira	def.	José Alday	Decision (split) (29–28, 28–29, 29–28)	3	5:00
Flyweight	C.J. Vergara	def.	Bruno Korea	TKO (knee to the body)	1	0:41
Bantamweight	Chad Anheliger	def.	Muin Gafurov	Decision (split) (29–28, 28–29, 29–28)	3	5:00

=== Contract awards ===
The following fighters were awarded contracts with the UFC:

- Josh Quinlan, Chidi Njokuani, Saimon Oliveira, C.J. Vergara, and Chad Anheliger

== Week 3 - September 14 ==
Dana White's Contender Series 39
- Promotion: DWCS
- Date: September 14, 2021
- Venue: UFC Apex Centre
- City: Las Vegas, Nevada, United States

Main Card
Weight class				Method	Round	Time	Notes
Light Heavyweight	Jailton Almeida	def.	Nasrudin Nasrudinov	Submission (rear-naked choke)	2	1:49
Bantamweight	Mo Miller	def.	Brandon Lewis	Decision (unanimous) (30–27, 30–27, 30–27)	3	5:00
Middleweight	Albert Duraev	def.	Caio Bittencourt	Submission (neck crank)	1	3:29
Heavyweight	Łukasz Brzeski	vs.	Dylan Potter	NC (overturned)	3	3:51	(Note: Originally a submission (rear-naked choke) win for Brzeski; overturned after he tested positive for clomiphene.)
Welterweight	Jack Della Maddalena	def.	Ange Loosa	Decision (unanimous) (30–27, 30–27, 30–27)	3	5:00
Women's Flyweight	Jasmine Jasudavicius	def.	Julia Polastri	Decision (unanimous) (29–27, 29–27, 29–27)	3	5:00

=== Contract awards ===
The following fighters were awarded contracts with the UFC:

- Jailton Almeida, Albert Duraev, Łukasz Brzeski, Jack Della Maddalena, and Jasmine Jasudavicius

== Week 4 - September 21 ==
Dana White's Contender Series 40
- Promotion: DWCS
- Date: September 21, 2021
- Venue: UFC Apex Centre
- City: Las Vegas, Nevada, United States

Main Card
Weight class				Method	Round	Time	Notes
Catchweight (189 lbs)	AJ Dobson	def.	Hashem Arkhagha	Submission (rear-naked choke)	1	4:21	(Note: Originally a middleweight bout; Arkhagha missed weight.)
Welterweight	Michael Morales	def.	Nikolay Veretennikov	Decision (unanimous) (29–28, 29–28, 30–27)	3	5:00
Featherweight	Steven Nguyen	def.	Theo Rlayang	Decision (unanimous) (29–27, 29–27, 30–26)	3	5:00	(Note: Rlayang was deducted one point in round 3 due to an eye poke.)
Flyweight	Kleydson Rodrigues	def.	Santo Curatolo	Decision (unanimous) (30–27, 30–27, 30–27)	3	5:00
Lightweight	Victor Martinez	def.	Jacob Rosales	Decision (unanimous) (29–28, 29–28, 29–28)	3	5:00

=== Contract awards ===
The following fighters were awarded contracts with the UFC:

- AJ Dobson, Michael Morales, Kleydson Rodrigues, and Victor Martinez

== Week 5 - September 28 ==
Dana White's Contender Series 41
- Promotion: DWCS
- Date: September 28, 2021
- Venue: UFC Apex Centre
- City: Las Vegas, Nevada, United States

Main Card
Weight class				Method	Round	Time	Notes
Light Heavyweight	Ihor Potieria	def.	Łukasz Sudolski	TKO (punches)	1	3:41
Middleweight	Caio Borralho	def.	Aaron Jeffery	Decision (unanimous) (29–28, 29–28, 30–27)	3	5:00
Lightweight	Daniel Zellhuber	def.	Lucas Almeida	Decision (unanimous) (29–28, 29–28, 29–28)	3	5:00
Heavyweight	Rizvan Kuniev	def.	Edivan Santos	TKO (punches)	3	1:00

=== Contract awards ===
The following fighters were awarded contracts with the UFC:

- Ihor Potieria and Daniel Zellhuber

== Week 6 - October 5 ==
Dana White's Contender Series 42
- Promotion: DWCS
- Date: October 5, 2021
- Venue: UFC Apex Centre
- City: Las Vegas, Nevada, United States

Main Card
Weight class				Method	Round	Time	Notes
Welterweight	Mike Malott	def.	Shimon Smotritsky	Submission (guillotine choke)	1	0:39
Flyweight	Carlos Hernandez	def.	Daniel Barez	Decision (split) (29–28, 28–29, 29–28)	3	5:00
Catchweight (139 lbs)	Fernie Garcia	def.	Joshua Weems	TKO (punches)	1	2:10	(Note: Originally a bantamweight bout; Weems missed weight.)
Middleweight	Joseph Holmes	def.	Shonte Barnes	Submission (rear-naked choke)	2	2:46
Lightweight	Genaro Valdéz	def.	Patrik White	TKO (punches)	2	0:44

=== Contract awards ===
The following fighters were awarded contracts with the UFC:

- Mike Malott, Carlos Hernandez, Fernie Garcia, and Genaro Valdéz

== Week 7 - October 12 ==
Dana White's Contender Series 43
- Promotion: DWCS
- Date: October 12, 2021
- Venue: UFC Apex Centre
- City: Las Vegas, Nevada, United States

Main Card
Weight class				Method	Round	Time	Notes
Catchweight (137.25 lbs)	Christian Rodriguez	def.	Reyes Cortez	Decision (unanimous) (30–27, 30–27, 30–27)	3	5:00	(Note: Originally a bantamweight bout; Rodriguez missed weight.)
Heavyweight	Martin Buday	def.	Lorenzo Hood	TKO (knee)	1	4:56
Catchweight (127 lbs)	Jake Hadley	def.	Mitch Raposo	Submission (rear-naked choke)	2	3:11	(Note: Originally a flyweight bout; Hadley missed weight.)
Lightweight	Viacheslav Borshchev	def.	Chris Duncan	KO (punch)	2	0:28
Women's Strawweight	Maria Silva	def.	Kathryn Paprocki	Decision (unanimous) (30–27, 30–27, 30–27)	3	5:00

=== Contract awards ===
The following fighters were awarded contracts with the UFC:

- Martin Buday, Jake Hadley, and Viacheslav Borshchev

== Week 8 - October 19 ==
Dana White's Contender Series 44
- Promotion: DWCS
- Date: October 19, 2021
- Venue: UFC Apex Centre
- City: Las Vegas, Nevada, United States

Main Card
Weight class				Method	Round	Time	Notes
Welterweight	Jonny Parsons	def.	Solomon Renfro	Decision (split) (29–28, 28–29, 29–28)	3	5:00
Women's Strawweight	Piera Rodríguez	def.	Valesca Machado	Decision (unanimous) (29–28, 29–28, 29–28)	3	5:00
Light Heavyweight	Caio Borralho	def.	Jesse Murray	TKO (punches)	1	1:41
Light Heavyweight	Armen Petrosyan	def.	Kaloyan Kolev	KO (head kick and punches)	1	4:27
Bantamweight	Pedro Falcão	def.	James Barnes	KO (punches)	3	3:55

=== Contract awards ===
The following fighters were awarded contracts with the UFC:

- Jonny Parsons, Piera Rodríguez, Caio Borralho, and Armen Petrosyan

== Week 9 - October 26 ==
Dana White's Contender Series 45
- Promotion: DWCS
- Date: October 26, 2021
- Venue: UFC Apex Centre
- City: Las Vegas, Nevada, United States

Main Card
Weight class				Method	Round	Time	Notes
Middleweight	Gadzhi Omargadzhiev	def.	Jansey Silva	Submission (kneebar)	1	4:19
Bantamweight	Cristian Quiñonez	def.	Xiao Long	Decision (unanimous) (30–27, 30–27, 30–27)	3	5:00
Catchweight (139 lbs)	Javid Basharat	def.	Oron Kahlon	Submission (guillotine choke)	3	4:12	(Note: Originally a bantamweight bout; Kahlon missed weight.)
Women's Flyweight	Karine Silva	def.	Qihui Yan	Submission (guillotine choke)	2	1:44
Lightweight	Manuel Torres	def.	Kolton Englund	TKO (punches)	1	2:10
Featherweight	Olivier Murad	def.	Xie Bin	Decision (split) (28–29, 29–28, 29–28)	3	5:00

=== Contract awards ===
The following fighters were awarded contracts with the UFC:

- Gadzhi Omargadzhiev, Cristian Quiñonez, Javid Basharat, Karine Silva, and Manuel Torres

== Week 10 - November 2 ==
Dana White's Contender Series 46
- Promotion: DWCS
- Date: November 2, 2021
- Venue: UFC Apex Centre
- City: Las Vegas, Nevada, United States

Main Card
Weight class				Method	Round	Time	Notes
Lightweight	Hayisaer Maheshate	def.	Achilles Estremadura	Decision (unanimous) (29–28, 29–28, 29–28)	3	5:00
Welterweight	Yohan Lainesse	def.	Justin Burlinson	KO (punches)	1	1:37
Flyweight	Erisson Ferreira da Silva	def.	Lun Qiu	Decision (unanimous) (29–28, 29–28, 29–28)	3	5:00
Featherweight	Jonas Bilharinho	def.	Canaan Kawaihae	TKO (spinning wheel kick)	3	4:00
Flyweight	Juan Puerta	def.	Zhifa Shang	Decision (split) (29–28, 28–29, 29–28)	3	5:00

=== Contract awards ===
The following fighters were awarded contracts with the UFC:

- Hayisaer Maheshate and Yohan Lainesse
