= Lynn Alvarez =

American mixed martial arts fighter

- Born: September 6, 1985 (age 41); Las Vegas, United States
- Other names: Lights Out, Weapon X
- Nationality: American
- Height: 5 ft 2 in (157 cm)
- Weight: 115 lb (52 kg; 8.2 st)
- Division: Strawweight
- Years active: 2011 - Present

Mixed martial arts record
- Total: 11
- Wins: 6
- By knockout: 1
- By submission: 5
- Losses: 5
- By knockout: 1
- By submission: 3
- By decision: 1

Other information
- Mixed martial arts record from Sherdog

Lynn Alvarez (born September 6, 1985) is an American mixed martial artist. She competes in the strawweight division for Invicta FC and has competed for Bellator.

== Mixed martial arts record ==
Professional record breakdown
11 matches	6 wins	5 losses
By knockout	1	1
By submission	5	3
By decision	0	1
No contests	0	

Res.	Record	Opponent	Method	Event	Date	Round	Time	Location	Notes
Loss	6–5	JJ Aldrich	Decision (unanimous)	Invicta FC 20: Evinger vs. Kunitskaya	November 18, 2016	3	5:00	Kansas City, Missouri	
Loss	6–4	Mizuki Inoue	Submission (armbar)	Invicta FC 18: Grasso vs. Esquibel	July 29, 2016	2	3:00	Kansas City, Missouri	
Win	6–3	Amber Stautzenberger	Submission (rear-naked choke)	Dakota FC: Winter Brawl 2014	January 11, 2014	1	0:45	Fargo, North Dakota	
Loss	5–3	Carla Esparza	TKO (strikes)	Invicta FC 3: Penne vs. Sugiyama	October 6, 2012	1	2:53	Kansas City, Kansas	
Loss	5–2	Jessica Aguilar	Submission (arm-triangle choke)	Bellator 24	August 12, 2010	1	4:01	Hollywood, Florida	
Win	5–1	Shoni Esquiro	Submission (armbar)	Freestyle Cage Fighting 34	July 25, 2009	1	2:43	Shawnee, Oklahoma	
Win	4–1	Chelsea Colarelli	Submission (armbar)	Shark Fights 1	October 24, 2008	1	1:56	Amarillo, Texas	
Win	3–1	Stephanie Bobo	TKO (punches)	Freestyle Cage Fighting 22	July 23, 2008	1		Shawnee, Oklahoma	
Win	2–1	Michelle Ould	Submission (choke)	Valor Fighting: Fight Night	March 7, 2008	3	1:33	Tustin, California	
Loss	1–1	Angela Magaña	Submission (armbar)	Tuff-N-Uff	February 1, 2008	2	1:25	Las Vegas, Nevada	
Win	1–0	Michelle Waterson	Submission (guillotine choke)	Ring of Fire 31: Undisputed	December 1, 2007	1	1:19	Broomfield, Colorado	
