= Jack Della Maddalena =

Australian mixed martial artist (born 1996)

- Born: Giacomo Della Maddalena; 10 September 1996 (age 30); Perth, Western Australia, Australia
- Height: 5 ft 11 in (1.80 m)
- Weight: 170 lb (77 kg; 12 st 2 lb)
- Division: Welterweight (2016–present); Middleweight (2016)
- Reach: 73 in (185 cm)
- Fighting out of: Perth, Western Australia, Australia
- Team: Scrappy MMA
- Rank: Black belt in Brazilian Jiu-Jitsu under Ben Vickers
- Years active: 2016–present

Mixed martial arts record
- Total: 22
- Wins: 18
- By knockout: 12
- By submission: 2
- By decision: 4
- Losses: 4
- By knockout: 2
- By submission: 1
- By decision: 1

Other information
- Mixed martial arts record from Sherdog

Giacomo "Jack" Della Maddalena (born 10 September 1996), also known by his initials JDM, is an Australian professional mixed martial artist. He currently competes in the Welterweight division of the Ultimate Fighting Championship (UFC), where he is the former UFC Welterweight Champion. As of 5 May 2026, he is #4 in the Meta UFC welterweight rankings.

== Early life and education ==
Giacomo Della Maddalena was born on 10 September 1996 in Perth, Western Australia, into a family of Australian and Italian descent as one of his grandfathers is from Sardinia. He attended St. Kevin's College in Melbourne, before returning to Perth and completing school at Aquinas College. While at St Kevin’s he was a friend and classmate of Olympian and Australian Rugby sevens player Henry Hutchison. Della Maddalena is an avid supporter of the Australian national rugby union team (Wallabies) and the Fremantle Dockers in the Australian Football League.

He started playing rugby at the age of eight and represented his school from year six to year twelve. Influenced by his older brother Josh, Della Maddalena joined a boxing gym at the age of fourteen, using it to improve his fitness for the rugby season. He fell in love with the sport, and after his rugby career ended, he transitioned into full-time MMA training.

== Mixed martial arts career ==
=== Early career ===
He made his professional debut on 12 March 2016 against Aldin Bates, losing the contest via TKO in the 3rd round. He went on to lose his next fight against Darcy Vendy via submission in the first round, before accumulating a nine-fight winning streak whilst securing the Eternal Welterweight Championship and defending it four times.

Della Maddalena was invited to face Congolese mixed martial artist Ange Loosa on 14 September 2021 at Dana White's Contender Series 39, where he won the bout via unanimous decision and secured a UFC contract.

=== Ultimate Fighting Championship ===
Della Maddalena was scheduled to make his UFC debut against The Ultimate Fighter: Brazil 3 middleweight winner Warlley Alves on 22 January 2022 at UFC 270. However, Alves pulled out in early January due to undisclosed reasons and he was replaced by promotional newcomer Pete Rodriguez. Della Maddalena won the bout via TKO in the first round.

Della Maddalena faced Ramazan Emeev on 11 June 2022 at UFC 275. He won the fight via TKO in round one. This win earned him the Performance of the Night award.

Della Maddalena faced Danny Roberts on 19 November 2022 at UFC Fight Night: Nzechukwu vs. Cuțelaba. He won the fight via technical knockout in round one. With this win, Della Maddalena earned his second straight Performance of the Night bonus.

Della Maddalena faced Randy Brown on 12 February 2023 at UFC 284. He won the bout via first round submission. The win earned him the Performance of the Night award.

Della Maddalena was scheduled to face Sean Brady on 8 July 2023 at UFC 290. However, on 30 June, Brady withdrew from the bout due to an undisclosed injury. He was replaced by promotional newcomer Josiah Harrell. The day before the event on 7 July, Harrell was pulled from the fight due to being diagnosed with Moyamoya disease during his pre-fight medical screening and the bout was scrapped.

Della Maddalena faced promotional newcomer Bassil Hafez on 15 July 2023 at UFC Fight Night: Holm vs. Bueno Silva. He won the bout via split decision. Both fighters earned the Fight of the Night bonus.

Della Maddalena faced Kevin Holland on 16 September 2023 at UFC Fight Night 227. He won the bout by split decision. 16 out of 16 media scorecards scored it for Della Maddalena.

Della Maddalena faced Gilbert Burns on 9 March 2024 at UFC 299. He won the fight by technical knockout in the third round. This fight earned him another Performance of the Night award.

==== UFC Welterweight Champion ====
Della Maddalena was scheduled to face former UFC Welterweight Champion Leon Edwards in the main event on 22 March 2025 at UFC Fight Night 255. However, he was pulled from that fight in order to compete against Belal Muhammad for the UFC Welterweight Championship on 10 May 2025 at UFC 315. Della Maddalena won the bout and the championship via unanimous decision. This fight earned him another Fight of the Night award.

On 28 August 2025, it was announced that Della Maddalena would face former UFC Lightweight Champion Islam Makhachev, who vacated the lightweight title at UFC 317, on 15 November 2025 at UFC 322. Della Maddalena lost the championship by unanimous decision.

==== Post-championship ====
Della Maddalena faced Carlos Prates on May 2, 2026 in the main event at UFC Fight Night 275. He lost the fight by technical knockout in the third round.

== Championships and accomplishments ==
=== Mixed martial arts ===
- Ultimate Fighting Championship
  - UFC Welterweight Championship (One time)
    - First Australian UFC Welterweight Champion
  - Performance of the Night (Four times) vs. Ramazan Emeev, Danny Roberts, Randy Brown and Gilbert Burns
  - Fight of the Night (Two times) vs. Bassil Hafez and Belal Muhammad
  - Tied (Leon Edwards & Ian Machado Garry) for the third longest win streak in UFC Welterweight division history (8)
  - UFC Honors Awards
    - 2024: Fan's Choice Comeback of the Year Nominee vs. Gilbert Burns
  - UFC.com Awards
    - 2022: Newcomer of the Year
    - 2025: Ranked #4 Fight of the Year vs. Belal Muhammad
- Eternal MMA
  - Eternal MMA Welterweight Championship (One time)
    - Four successful title defenses
- Reign Fighting
  - Reign Fighting Welterweight Championship (One time)
- ESPN
  - 2022 UFC Men's Rookie of the Year
- Cageside Press
  - 2022 Newcomer of the Year tied with Jailton Almeida
- Bleacher Report
  - 2022 Best Fighter on the Rise
- GiveMeSport
  - 2022 UFC Prospect of the Year
- LowKick MMA
  - 2022 UFC Newcomer of the Year
- MMA Fighting
  - 2022 Third Team MMA All-Star

== Mixed martial arts record ==
Professional record breakdown
22 matches	18 wins	4 losses
By knockout	12	2
By submission	2	1
By decision	4	1

Res.	Record	Opponent	Method	Event	Date	Round	Time	Location	Notes
Loss	18–4	Carlos Prates	TKO (leg kicks and elbows)	UFC Fight Night: Della Maddalena vs. Prates	2 May 2026	3	3:17	Perth, Australia	
Loss	18–3	Islam Makhachev	Decision (unanimous)	UFC 322	15 November 2025	5	5:00	New York City, New York, United States	Lost the UFC Welterweight Championship.
Win	18–2	Belal Muhammad	Decision (unanimous)	UFC 315	10 May 2025	5	5:00	Montreal, Quebec, Canada	Won the UFC Welterweight Championship. Fight of the Night.
Win	17–2	Gilbert Burns	KO (knee and elbows)	UFC 299	9 March 2024	3	3:43	Miami, Florida, United States	Performance of the Night.
Win	16–2	Kevin Holland	Decision (split)	UFC Fight Night: Grasso vs. Shevchenko 2	16 September 2023	3	5:00	Las Vegas, Nevada, United States	
Win	15–2	Bassil Hafez	Decision (split)	UFC on ESPN: Holm vs. Bueno Silva	15 July 2023	3	5:00	Las Vegas, Nevada, United States	Fight of the Night.
Win	14–2	Randy Brown	Submission (rear-naked choke)	UFC 284	12 February 2023	1	2:13	Perth, Australia	Performance of the Night.
Win	13–2	Danny Roberts	TKO (punches)	UFC Fight Night: Nzechukwu vs. Cuțelaba	19 November 2022	1	3:24	Las Vegas, Nevada, United States	Performance of the Night.
Win	12–2	Ramazan Emeev	TKO (punches)	UFC 275	11 June 2022	1	2:32	Kallang, Singapore	Performance of the Night.
Win	11–2	Pete Rodriguez	TKO (punches)	UFC 270	22 January 2022	1	2:59	Anaheim, California, United States	
Win	10–2	Ange Loosa	Decision (unanimous)	Dana White's Contender Series 39	14 September 2021	3	5:00	Las Vegas, Nevada, United States	
Win	9–2	Aldin Bates	KO (punch)	Eternal MMA 53	10 October 2020	1	1:12	Perth, Australia	Defended the Eternal MMA Welterweight Championship.
Win	8–2	Glen Pettigrew	TKO (punches)	Eternal MMA 51	29 February 2020	2	1:55	Perth, Australia	Defended the Eternal MMA Welterweight Championship.
Win	7–2	Kevin Jousset	TKO (doctor stoppage)	Eternal MMA 48	4 October 2019	2	5:00	Melbourne, Australia	Defended the Eternal MMA Welterweight Championship.
Win	6–2	Dean Abramo	TKO (punches)	Eternal MMA 37	22 September 2018	1	2:27	Perth, Australia	Defended the Eternal MMA Welterweight Championship.
Win	5–2	Luke Howard	KO (punch)	Eternal MMA 31	10 March 2018	2	0:28	Perth, Australia	Won the Eternal MMA Welterweight Championship.
Win	4–2	James Duckett	Submission (rear-naked choke)	Cage Warriors 88	28 October 2017	2	3:44	Liverpool, England	
Win	3–2	Ty Duncan	TKO (punches)	Eternal MMA 26	8 July 2017	2	0:19	Gold Coast, Australia	
Win	2–2	Glen Pettigrew	TKO (punches)	Reign Fighting 3	8 March 2017	1	3:26	Brisbane, Australia	Won the Reign Fighting Welterweight Championship.
Win	1–2	Brandt Cogill	KO (elbow)	Eternal MMA 20	15 October 2016	1	1:57	Gold Coast, Australia	Return to Welterweight.
Loss	0–2	Darcy Vendy	Submission (rear-naked choke)	Eternal MMA 17	28 May 2016	1	4:11	Gold Coast, Australia	Middleweight debut.
Loss	0–1	Aldin Bates	TKO (punches)	Eternal MMA 15	12 March 2016	3	2:16	Perth, Australia	Welterweight debut.

== Pay-per-view bouts ==
No.	Event	Fight	Date	Venue	City	PPV buys
1.	UFC 315	Muhammad vs. Della Maddalena	May 10, 2025	Bell Centre	Montreal, Quebec, Canada	Not Disclosed
2.	UFC 322	Della Maddalena vs. Makhachev	November 15, 2025	Madison Square Garden	New York City, New York, United States	Not Disclosed

== See also ==
- List of UFC champions
- List of current UFC fighters
- List of Dana White's Contender Series alumni
- List of male mixed martial artists

Awards and achievements
Preceded by Belal Muhammad	15th UFC Welterweight Champion; 10 May 2025 – 15 November 2025	Succeeded by Islam Makhachev
