= Maycee Barber =

American mixed martial artist

- Born: Maycee Kaye Barber; May 18, 1998 (age 28); Greeley, Colorado, U.S.
- Other names: The Future
- Height: 5 ft 5 in (1.65 m)
- Weight: 125 lb (57 kg; 8 st 13 lb)
- Division: Flyweight
- Reach: 65 in (165 cm)
- Style: Karate
- Fighting out of: Sacramento, California, U.S.
- Team: Fort Collins MMA; Roufusport (until 2021); Team Alpha Male (2021–present)
- Rank: 2nd degree black belt in Karate; Purple belt in Brazilian Jiu-Jitsu under Rener and Ryron Gracie
- Years active: 2017–present

Mixed martial arts record
- Total: 18
- Wins: 15
- By knockout: 6
- By submission: 2
- By decision: 7
- Losses: 3
- By knockout: 1
- By decision: 2

Amateur record
- Total: 1
- Wins: 1
- By knockout: 1
- Losses: 0

Other information
- Mixed martial arts record from Sherdog

Maycee Kaye Barber (born May 18, 1998) is an American mixed martial artist. She currently competes in the women's Flyweight division of the Ultimate Fighting Championship (UFC). As of June 20, 2026, she is #9 in the Meta UFC women's flyweight rankings and as of April 28, 2026, she is #15 in the UFC women's pound-for-pound rankings.

== Background ==
Barber was born in Greeley, Colorado. She began pursuing mixed martial arts (MMA) at an early age and set her eyes on becoming a professional fighter. In an interview with Yahoo Sports' Kevin Iole, Barber's father, Bucky Barber, said: "At that point, it was, 'OK, the better we make her as a fighter, the less damage she's going to take.' So we started to travel, and we took her literally all over the United States."

Barber has a sister, Emma, and a younger brother, Wyatt. Wyatt is also a mixed martial artist signed to Bellator.

== Mixed martial arts career ==
=== Legacy Fighting Alliance ===
Barber made her professional debut against Itzel Esquivel at LFA 14 on June 23, 2017. She won the fight by a first-round armbar submission.

Barber was booked to face Mallory Martin at LFA 22 on September 8, 2017. She won the fight by unanimous decision.

Barber faced Kaila Thompson at LFA 33 on February 18, 2018. She won the fight by a first-round submission.

Barber faced Audrey Perkins at LFA 39 on May 4, 2018, in her final fight with the promotion. She won the fight by a second-round technical knockout, the first knockout victory of her professional career.

Mayce Barber faced Jamie Colleen at Dana White's Contender Series 13 on July 17, 2018. She received a UFC contract after earning a stoppage in the third round.

=== Ultimate Fighting Championship ===
Barber made her UFC debut on November 10, 2018 on UFC Fight Night 139 against Hannah Cifers. She won the fight via TKO in round two.

Barber faced JJ Aldrich at UFC Fight Night 148 on March 23, 2019. Barber won the fight via technical knockout in round two.

Barber faced Gillian Robertson on October 18, 2019 at UFC on ESPN 6. She won the fight via technical knockout in round one.

Barber faced Roxanne Modafferi on January 18, 2020 at UFC 246. In an upset, she lost the one-sided fight by unanimous decision.

After a year of hiatus recovering from a knee injury, Barber faced Alexa Grasso on February 13, 2021 at UFC 258. She lost the fight via unanimous decision.

Barber faced Miranda Maverick on July 24, 2021 at UFC on ESPN 27. She won the fight via controversial split decision. 22 out of 22 media outlets scored the bout as a win for Maverick.

Barber was expected to face Montana De La Rosa on December 11, 2021 at UFC 269. However, De La Rosa pulled out of the fight in early October citing injury and was replaced by Erin Blanchfield. In turn, Barber withdrew in early November due to undisclosed reasons.

Barber faced Montana De La Rosa on April 23, 2022 at UFC Fight Night 205. She won the fight via unanimous decision.

Barber, replacing injured Casey O'Neill, faced Jessica Eye on July 2, 2022, at UFC 276. She won the bout via unanimous decision. The bout also marked the last of her prevailing contract, and she re-signed with the UFC later in the year.

Barber faced Andrea Lee on March 25, 2023, at UFC on ESPN 43. She won the bout via split decision.

Barber faced Amanda Ribas on June 24, 2023 at UFC on ABC 5. She won the bout in the second round, defeating Ribas via elbows and punches on the ground. The win earned Barber her first Performance of the Night award.

Barber faced Katlyn Cerminara on March 9, 2024, at UFC 299. She won the bout by unanimous decision.

Barber was scheduled to face Rose Namajunas on July 13, 2024, at UFC on ESPN 59. However, Barber withdrew from the bout, due to what was later revealed to be ongoing health problems, and was replaced by Tracy Cortez.

Barber was scheduled to face Erin Blanchfield in the main event on May 31, 2025 at UFC on ESPN 68. At the weigh-ins, Barber weighed in at 126.5 pounds, half a pound over the women's flyweight non-title fight limit. The bout was set to be at catchweight and Barber was to be fined 20 percent of her purse which was to go to Blanchfield. However, minutes before the walkouts were to take place, Barber had to withdraw due to a medical issue involving a seizure and the bout was cancelled.

Barber faced Karine Silva on December 6, 2025 at UFC 323. She won the fight by unanimous decision.

Barber faced Alexa Grasso in a rematch on March 28, 2026, at UFC Fight Night 271. She lost the fight by knockout in the first round.

Barber was scheduled to face Carli Judice on December 12, 2026 at UFC 335. However, Barber had to withdraw for undisclosed reasons leaving it unclear whether a replacement opponent would be found for Judice.

== Personal life ==
In mid-2024 shortly after UFC 299, Barber had a near-death experience involving a combination of pneumonia, strep throat, and a staph infection which led her to be hospitalized for nine days.

== Championships and accomplishments ==
- Ultimate Fighting Championship
  - Performance of the Night (One time) vs. Amanda Ribas
  - Tied (Manon Fiorot, Carli Judice & Casey O'Neill) for second most knockouts in UFC Women's Flyweight division history (3) (behind Valentina Shevchenko)
  - Tied (Natália Silva & Jasmine Jasudavicius) for third most wins in UFC Women's Flyweight division history (9)
  - Tied (Manon Fiorot) for the third longest win streak in UFC Women's Flyweight division history (7)
  - UFC.com Awards
    - 2018: Ranked #4 Newcomer of the Year
- MMA Junkie
  - 2025 Comeback Fighter of the Year

== Mixed martial arts record ==
Professional record breakdown
| 18 matches | 15 wins | 3 losses |
| By knockout | 6 | 1 |
| By submission | 2 | 0 |
| By decision | 7 | 2 |

| Res. | Record | Opponent | Method | Event | Date | Round | Time | Location | Notes |
|---|---|---|---|---|---|---|---|---|---|
| Loss | 15–3 | Alexa Grasso | KO (punch) | UFC Fight Night: Adesanya vs. Pyfer | March 28, 2026 | 1 | 2:42 | Seattle, Washington, United States | |
| Win | 15–2 | Karine Silva | Decision (unanimous) | UFC 323 | December 6, 2025 | 3 | 5:00 | Las Vegas, Nevada, United States | |
| Win | 14–2 | Katlyn Cerminara | Decision (unanimous) | UFC 299 | March 9, 2024 | 3 | 5:00 | Miami, Florida, United States | |
| Win | 13–2 | Amanda Ribas | TKO (elbows and punches) | UFC on ABC: Emmett vs. Topuria | June 24, 2023 | 2 | 3:42 | Jacksonville, Florida, United States | Performance of the Night. |
| Win | 12–2 | Andrea Lee | Decision (split) | UFC on ESPN: Vera vs. Sandhagen | March 25, 2023 | 3 | 5:00 | San Antonio, Texas, United States | |
| Win | 11–2 | Jessica Eye | Decision (unanimous) | UFC 276 | July 2, 2022 | 3 | 5:00 | Las Vegas, Nevada, United States | |
| Win | 10–2 | Montana De La Rosa | Decision (unanimous) | UFC Fight Night: Lemos vs. Andrade | April 23, 2022 | 3 | 5:00 | Las Vegas, Nevada, United States | |
| Win | 9–2 | Miranda Maverick | Decision (split) | UFC on ESPN: Sandhagen vs. Dillashaw | July 24, 2021 | 3 | 5:00 | Las Vegas, Nevada, United States | |
| Loss | 8–2 | Alexa Grasso | Decision (unanimous) | UFC 258 | February 13, 2021 | 3 | 5:00 | Las Vegas, Nevada, United States | |
| Loss | 8–1 | Roxanne Modafferi | Decision (unanimous) | UFC 246 | January 18, 2020 | 3 | 5:00 | Las Vegas, Nevada, United States | |
| Win | 8–0 | Gillian Robertson | TKO (punches) | UFC on ESPN: Reyes vs. Weidman | October 18, 2019 | 1 | 3:04 | Boston, Massachusetts, United States | |
| Win | 7–0 | JJ Aldrich | TKO (knees and punches) | UFC Fight Night: Thompson vs. Pettis | March 23, 2019 | 2 | 3:01 | Nashville, Tennessee, United States | Flyweight debut. |
| Win | 6–0 | Hannah Cifers | TKO (elbows and punches) | UFC Fight Night: The Korean Zombie vs. Rodríguez | November 10, 2018 | 2 | 2:01 | Denver, Colorado, United States | |
| Win | 5–0 | Jamie Colleen | TKO (elbows) | Dana White's Contender Series 13 | July 13, 2018 | 3 | 4:15 | Las Vegas, Nevada, United States | |
| Win | 4–0 | Audrey Perkins | TKO (punches and elbows) | LFA 39 | May 4, 2018 | 3 | 2:54 | Vail, Colorado, United States | |
| Win | 3–0 | Kaila Thompson | Submission (rear-naked choke) | LFA 33 | February 18, 2018 | 1 | 0:31 | Dallas, Texas, United States | Catchweight (120 lb) bout. |
| Win | 2–0 | Mallory Martin | Decision (unanimous) | LFA 22 | September 8, 2017 | 3 | 5:00 | Broomfield, Colorado, United States | |
| Win | 1–0 | Itzel Esquivel | Submission (armbar) | LFA 14 | June 23, 2017 | 1 | 3:52 | Houston, Texas, United States | Strawweight debut. |

== See also ==
- List of current UFC fighters
- List of Dana White's Contender Series alumni
- List of female mixed martial artists
