= Mayra Bueno Silva =

Brazilian mixed martial artist

- Born: August 22, 1991 (age 35); Uberlândia, Minas Gerais, Brazil
- Other names: Sheetara
- Height: 5 ft 7 in (170 cm)
- Weight: 135 lb (61 kg; 9 st 9 lb)
- Division: Flyweight (2016, 2018–2021, 2025); Bantamweight (2015, 2016–2018, 2022–present)
- Reach: 66 1/2 in (169 cm)
- Fighting out of: São Paulo, Brazil
- Team: Chute Boxe Diego Lima (2016–2021); American Top Team (2022–present)
- Rank: Brown belt in Brazilian Jiu-Jitsu
- Years active: 2016–present

Mixed martial arts record
- Total: 19
- Wins: 10
- By knockout: 1
- By submission: 7
- By decision: 2
- Losses: 7
- By knockout: 1
- By decision: 6
- Draws: 1
- No contests: 1

Other information
- Mixed martial arts record from Sherdog

Mayra Bueno Silva (born August 22, 1991) is a Brazilian mixed martial artist who competed in the women's Bantamweight division of the Ultimate Fighting Championship (UFC), where she challenged for the UFC Women's Bantamweight Championship in January 2024.

== Background ==
Born in Uberlandia, Silva has lived and trained in gyms in Campinas and São Paulo since January 2015, a couple months before she made her professional debut.

== Mixed martial arts career ==
=== Early career ===
Starting her career in 2016, Silva only needed three fights on the regional Brazilian scene, winning all three and the Batalha MMA Bantamweight title in the process, to be invited onto Dana White's Contender Series Brazil 1. Making quick work of Mayana Souza dos Santos via ninja choke in the first round, she earned a contract to the UFC.

=== Ultimate Fighting Championship ===
Silva made her debut on September 22, 2018, facing Gillian Robertson at UFC Fight Night 137. She won the fight via a submission in round one.

Silva faced Maryna Moroz on March 14, 2020, at UFC Fight Night 170. She lost the fight via unanimous decision. This fight earned her the Fight of the Night award.

Silva faced Mara Romero Borella on September 19, 2020, at UFC Fight Night 178. She won the fight via a submission in round one.

Silva faced Montana De La Rosa on February 27, 2021, at UFC Fight Night 186. Following a point deduction for Bueno Silva for illegally grabbing the fence, the fight ended in a majority draw.

Replacing injured Ji Yeon Kim, Silva was expected to face Poliana Botelho on May 1, 2021, at UFC on ESPN 23. Bueno suffered a back injury in late March and she was pulled from the bout.

Silva was scheduled to face Manon Fiorot on September 25, 2021, at UFC 266. The bout was postponed to UFC Fight Night 195 due to COVID-19 protocols. Silva lost the fight via unanimous decision.

Returning to Bantamweight, Silva faced Wu Yanan on April 16, 2022, at UFC on ESPN 34. She won the fight via unanimous decision. This fight earned her the Fight of the Night award.

Silva faced Stephanie Egger on August 6, 2022, at UFC on ESPN 40. She won the fight via an armbar submission in round one.

Silva faced Lina Länsberg on February 18, 2023, at UFC Fight Night 219. She won the fight via a kneebar submission in round two. This win earned her the Performance of the Night award.

Silva was scheduled to face Miesha Tate on June 3, 2023, at UFC on ESPN 46. However, on May 10, it was announced that Tate suffered an undisclosed injury and Bueno Silva was moved to headline UFC on ESPN 49 against another former bantamweight champion in Holly Holm. She won the fight via ninja choke in the second round. The win also earned Silva her second consecutive Performance of the Night bonus award. On August 21, 2023, it was announced that Bueno Silva had been flagged by the Nevada State Athletic Commission for a potential doping violation after testing positive for Ritalinic acid in a pre-fight test. Bueno Silva claimed that the substance comes from an ADHD medication she had been taking for the past three years. Her bout with Holm was later overturned to a No Contest and she was suspended, being eligible to fight again on November 29, 2023.

Silva faced Raquel Pennington on January 20, 2024, at UFC 297 for the vacant UFC Women's Bantamweight Championship. She lost the fight via unanimous decision.

Silva faced Macy Chiasson on June 29, 2024, at UFC 303. She lost the fight by technical knockout via doctor stoppage after Chiasson's elbow opened a cut above her eye. $2,500 of Silva's purse was withheld by the Nevada State Athletic Commission (NSAC) as a result of jumping over the cage after the fight was stopped.

Silva faced Jasmine Jasudavicius in a flyweight bout on February 1, 2025 at UFC Fight Night 250. She lost the fight by unanimous decision.

Silva was set to face Joselyne Edwards on August 9, 2025 at UFC on ESPN 72. However, Bueno Silva pulled out due to undisclosed reasons and was replaced by Priscila Cachoeira.

Silva faced Jacqueline Cavalcanti on November 8, 2025, at UFC Fight Night 264. She lost the fight by unanimous decision.

Silva faced Michelle Montague on April 25, 2026 at UFC Fight Night 274. She lost the fight by unanimous decision.

On May 18, 2026, it was reported that Silva was removed from the UFC roster.

== Personal life ==
Silva's girlfriend is UFC alum Gloria de Paula, they met in 2016.

== Championships and accomplishments ==
- Ultimate Fighting Championship
  - Fight of the Night (Two times) vs. Maryna Moroz and Wu Yanan
  - Performance of the Night (Two times) vs. Lina Länsberg and Holly Holm
- Batalha MMA
  - BMMA Bantamweight Championship (one time)
- MMA Fighting
  - 2022 Third Team MMA All-Star
  - 2023 First Team MMA All-Star

== Mixed martial arts record ==
Professional record breakdown
| 19 matches | 10 wins | 7 losses |
| By knockout | 1 | 1 |
| By submission | 7 | 0 |
| By decision | 2 | 6 |
| Draws | 1 | |
| No contests | 1 | |

| Res. | Record | Opponent | Method | Event | Date | Round | Time | Location | Notes |
|---|---|---|---|---|---|---|---|---|---|
| Loss | 10–7–1 (1) | Michelle Montague | Decision (unanimous) | UFC Fight Night: Sterling vs. Zalal | April 25, 2026 | 3 | 5:00 | Las Vegas, Nevada, United States | |
| Loss | 10–6–1 (1) | Jacqueline Cavalcanti | Decision (unanimous) | UFC Fight Night: Bonfim vs. Brown | November 8, 2025 | 3 | 5:00 | Las Vegas, Nevada, United States | |
| Loss | 10–5–1 (1) | Jasmine Jasudavicius | Decision (unanimous) | UFC Fight Night: Adesanya vs. Imavov | February 1, 2025 | 3 | 5:00 | Riyadh, Saudi Arabia | Flyweight bout. |
| Loss | 10–4–1 (1) | Macy Chiasson | TKO (doctor stoppage) | UFC 303 | June 29, 2024 | 2 | 1:58 | Las Vegas, Nevada, United States | |
| Loss | 10–3–1 (1) | Raquel Pennington | Decision (unanimous) | UFC 297 | January 20, 2024 | 5 | 5:00 | Toronto, Ontario, Canada | For the vacant UFC Women's Bantamweight Championship. |
| NC | 10–2–1 (1) | Holly Holm | NC (overturned) | UFC on ESPN: Holm vs. Bueno Silva | July 15, 2023 | 2 | 0:38 | Las Vegas, Nevada, United States | Performance of the Night. Originally a submission (ninja choke) win for Bueno Silva; overturned after she tested positive for ritalinic acid. |
| Win | 10–2–1 | Lina Länsberg | Submission (kneebar) | UFC Fight Night: Andrade vs. Blanchfield | February 18, 2023 | 2 | 4:45 | Las Vegas, Nevada, United States | Performance of the Night. |
| Win | 9–2–1 | Stephanie Egger | Submission (armbar) | UFC on ESPN: Santos vs. Hill | August 6, 2022 | 1 | 1:17 | Las Vegas, Nevada, United States | |
| Win | 8–2–1 | Wu Yanan | Decision (unanimous) | UFC on ESPN: Luque vs. Muhammad 2 | April 16, 2022 | 3 | 5:00 | Las Vegas, Nevada, United States | Return to Bantamweight. Fight of the Night. |
| Loss | 7–2–1 | Manon Fiorot | Decision (unanimous) | UFC Fight Night: Ladd vs. Dumont | October 16, 2021 | 3 | 5:00 | Las Vegas, Nevada, United States | |
| Draw | 7–1–1 | Montana De La Rosa | Draw (majority) | UFC Fight Night: Rozenstruik vs. Gane | February 27, 2021 | 3 | 5:00 | Las Vegas, Nevada, United States | Bueno Silva was deducted one point in round 1 for grabbing the fence. |
| Win | 7–1 | Mara Romero Borella | Submission (armbar) | UFC Fight Night: Covington vs. Woodley | September 19, 2020 | 1 | 2:29 | Las Vegas, Nevada, United States | |
| Loss | 6–1 | Maryna Moroz | Decision (unanimous) | UFC Fight Night: Lee vs. Oliveira | March 14, 2020 | 3 | 5:00 | Brasília, Brazil | Fight of the Night. |
| Win | 6–0 | Gillian Robertson | Submission (armbar) | UFC Fight Night: Santos vs. Anders | September 22, 2018 | 1 | 4:55 | São Paulo, Brazil | Return to Flyweight. |
| Win | 5–0 | Mayana Souza | Technical Submission (ninja choke) | Dana White's Contender Series Brazil 1 | August 10, 2018 | 1 | 1:02 | Las Vegas, Nevada, United States | |
| Win | 4–0 | Daiane Firmino | Decision (split) | Batalha MMA 5 | March 11, 2017 | 5 | 5:00 | São Paulo, Brazil | Won the vacant BMMA Bantamweight Championship. |
| Win | 3–0 | Taynna Taygma | Submission (armbar) | Premium FC 7 | September 21, 2016 | 1 | 1:20 | São Paulo, Brazil | Return to Bantamweight. |
| Win | 2–0 | Marilia Santos | TKO (retirement) | Sidney Sibamba Fight 4 | April 30, 2016 | 1 | 5:00 | São Paulo, Brazil | Flyweight debut. |
| Win | 1–0 | Shun Lee | Submission (armbar) | Delta Fight Club | March 7, 2015 | 1 | 0:58 | Minas Gerais, Brazil | Bantamweight debut. |

== See also ==
- List of Dana White's Contender Series alumni
- List of female mixed martial artists
