= UFC 297 =

2024 mixed martial event

UFC 297: Strickland vs. du Plessis
- The poster for UFC 297: Strickland vs. du Plessis
- Promotion: Ultimate Fighting Championship
- Date: January 20, 2024
- Venue: Scotiabank Arena
- City: Toronto, Ontario, Canada
- Attendance: 18,559
- Total gate: $7,898,695

Event chronology
UFC Fight Night: Ankalaev vs. Walker 2	UFC 297: Strickland vs. du Plessis	UFC Fight Night: Dolidze vs. Imavov

UFC 297: Strickland vs. du Plessis was a mixed martial arts event produced by the Ultimate Fighting Championship that took place on January 20, 2024, at Scotiabank Arena in Toronto, Ontario, Canada.

== Background ==
The event marked the promotion's seventh visit to Toronto and first since UFC 231 in December 2018.

A UFC Middleweight Championship bout between current champion Sean Strickland and former KSW Welterweight Champion Dricus du Plessis headlined the event.

A UFC Women's Bantamweight Championship bout for the vacant title between former title challenger Raquel Pennington and Mayra Bueno Silva took place at the event. The title was vacated when former champion Amanda Nunes announced her retirement immediately after defending her title at UFC 289.

A UFC Featherweight Championship bout between current champion Alexander Volkanovski and Ilia Topuria was expected to take place at this event. However, Volkanovski was instead pulled to face Islam Makhachev for the UFC Lightweight Championship at UFC 294. As a result, this fight was pushed back one month to headline UFC 298.

A light heavyweight rematch between former KSW and UFC Light Heavyweight Champion Jan Błachowicz and Aleksandar Rakić was expected to take place at the event. The pairing previously met at UFC on ESPN: Błachowicz vs. Rakić where Blachowicz won the fight after Rakić was rendered unable to continue due to a knee injury. However, Błachowicz withdrew due to a shoulder injury and the bout was scrapped.

A light heavyweight bout between former title challenger Dominick Reyes and Carlos Ulberg was scheduled for this event. However, in late December 2023, it was announced that match was off due to an injury sustained by Ulberg. They were rescheduled for UFC Fight Night: Brady vs. Luque two months later.

At the weigh-ins, Ramon Taveras and Malcolm Gordon missed weight. Taveras weighed in at 139.75 pounds, three and three quarters pounds over the bantamweight non-title fight limit. Gordon weighed in at 127.5 pounds, one and a half pounds over the flyweight non-title fight limit. Both bouts proceeded at catchweight with Taveras forfeiting 30% and Gordon 20% of their purses, which went to their opponents Serhiy Sidey and Jimmy Flick respectively.

Prior to the event, UFC president Dana White announced that the event had set new records for the highest grossing arena gate in UFC history and Canada.

During the event's broadcast, former UFC Lightweight Champion Frankie Edgar was announced as the next "modern wing" UFC Hall of Fame inductee during June's International Fight Week festivities in Las Vegas.

== Results ==
Main card
Weight class				Method	Round	Time	Notes
Middleweight	Dricus du Plessis	def.	Sean Strickland (c)	Decision (split) (47–48, 48–47, 48–47)	5	5:00	(Note: For the UFC Middleweight Championship.)
Women's Bantamweight	Raquel Pennington	def.	Mayra Bueno Silva	Decision (unanimous) (49–46, 49–46, 49–45)	5	5:00	(Note: For the vacant UFC Women's Bantamweight Championship.)
Welterweight	Neil Magny	def.	Mike Malott	TKO (punches)	3	4:45
Middleweight	Chris Curtis	def.	Marc-André Barriault	Decision (split) (30–27, 28–29, 30–27)	3	5:00
Featherweight	Movsar Evloev	def.	Arnold Allen	Decision (unanimous) (29–28, 29–28, 29–28)	3	5:00
Preliminary card (ESPN / ESPN+)
Bantamweight	Garrett Armfield	def.	Brad Katona	Decision (unanimous) (29–28, 29–28, 29–28)	3	5:00
Featherweight	Sean Woodson	def.	Charles Jourdain	Decision (split) (28–29, 29–28, 29–28)	3	5:00
Catchweight (139.75 lb)	Ramon Taveras	def.	Serhiy Sidey	Decision (split) (28–29, 29–28, 29–28)	3	5:00
Women's Strawweight	Gillian Robertson	def.	Polyana Viana	TKO (punches)	2	3:12
Early preliminary card (ESPN+ / UFC Fight Pass)
Welterweight	Sam Patterson	def.	Yohan Lainesse	Submission (rear-naked choke)	1	2:03
Women's Bantamweight	Jasmine Jasudavicius	def.	Priscila Cachoeira	Submission (anaconda choke)	3	4:21
Catchweight (127.5 lb)	Jimmy Flick	def.	Malcolm Gordon	Submission (arm-triangle choke)	2	1:17

== Bonus awards ==
The following fighters received $50,000 bonuses.

- Fight of the Night: Dricus du Plessis vs. Sean Strickland
- Performance of the Night: Gillian Robertson and Jasmine Jasudavicius

== See also ==
- 2024 in UFC
- List of current UFC fighters
- List of UFC events
