= Karine Silva =

Brazilian mixed martial artist (born 1993)

- Born: Karine Silva de Almeida; December 2, 1993 (age 32); Dourados, Mato Grosso do Sul, Brazil
- Other names: Killer
- Height: 5 ft 4 in (163 cm)
- Weight: 125 lb (57 kg; 8 st 13 lb)
- Division: Flyweight
- Reach: 67 in (170 cm)
- Stance: Orthodox
- Fighting out of: Curitiba, Paraná, Brazil
- Team: Fighting Nerds
- Rank: Black belt in Brazilian Jiu-Jitsu
- Years active: 2013–present

Mixed martial arts record
- Total: 27
- Wins: 20
- By knockout: 9
- By submission: 8
- By decision: 3
- Losses: 7
- By knockout: 1
- By submission: 2
- By decision: 4

Other information
- Mixed martial arts record from Sherdog

Karine Silva de Almeida (born December 2, 1993) is a Brazilian professional mixed martial artist who competes in the women's Flyweight division of the Ultimate Fighting Championship (UFC). As of November 7, 2026, she is #12 in the Meta UFC women's flyweight rankings.

== Background ==
With minimal financial resources, Silva took the daring step of leaving her job to move into a martial arts academy. Despite lacking support from her family, both morally and financially, she persevered. Working odd jobs, from security guard to masseuse and receptionist, she hustled to sustain herself while immersing herself in martial arts training.

Silva's venture into the world of combat sports began with "Chinese boxing", eventually transitioning to mixed martial arts. At 19, she made her professional debut, although she hadn't initially planned on pursuing a career in the sport. Driven by her newfound passion, she abandoned school, family, and job to fully commit to her training. Her journey took a significant turn when she joined a team that offered comprehensive training in various disciplines like luta livre, wrestling, MMA, and muay Thai.

== Mixed martial arts career ==
=== Early career ===
Silva's early career had primarily unfolded in Brazil, except for an ill-fated venture to Russia. During her early years, she dominated under the Aspera Fighting Championship banner, capturing six wins and headlining AFC 20 with a first-round armbar victory over Leticia Oliveira Ribeiro. Her only loss came against fellow future UFC fighter Maryna Moroz at XFC International 7 on November 1, 2014, being submitted via armbar in the first round. She would go on to win her next 4 bouts via stoppage, however, her international debut ended in defeat, as Marina Mokhnatkina submitted her with a kneebar at Fight Nights Global 81: Matmuratov vs. Ignatiev in December 2017.

She would go on to lose her next bout via unanimous decision to Dione Barbosa after a two year layoff, Silve started building momentum by dropping down back to flyweight and knocking out Vitoria Ferreira in August 2019. Silva embarked on a five-fight winning streak that positioned her for her shot at making the UFC.

Her chance came against Qihui Yan on Dana White's Contender Series 45, where she displayed her defensive prowess in the first round by thwarting Yan's attempts and even landing shots from the bottom. In the second round, Silva turned the tide with offensive aggression. She capitalized on an opportunity, executing a flawless guillotine choke that compelled Yan to tap, sealing her victory at 1:44 into Round 2.

=== Ultimate Fighting Championship ===
Silva made her promotional debut against Poliana Botelho on June 4, 2022 at UFC Fight Night 207. She won the fight via a brabo choke in round one. This win earned her the Performance of the Night award.

In her sophomore performance, Silva faced Invicta Champion Ketlen Souza on June 3, 2023, at UFC on ESPN 46. She won the fight by kneebar submission in the first round.

Silva rematched Maryna Moroz on August 19, 2023, at UFC 292. She won the fight via a guillotine choke submission in the first round.

Silva faced Ariane Lipski on April 27, 2024 at UFC on ESPN 55. She won the fight by unanimous decision.

Silva faced Viviane Araújo on November 16, 2024 at UFC 309. She lost the fight by unanimous decision.

Silva was scheduled to face JJ Aldrich on August 16, 2025 at UFC 319. However, Aldrich withdrew from the fight for undisclosed reasons and was replaced by Dione Barbosa. She won the fight via unanimous decision.

Silva faced Maycee Barber on December 6, 2025 at UFC 323. She lost the fight by unanimous decision.

Silva faced Jasmine Jasudavicius on April 18, 2026 at UFC Fight Night 273. She lost the fight by unanimous decision.

Silva faced Gabriella Fernandes on November 7, 2026 at UFC Fight Night 293. She won the fight via unanimous decision.

== Championships and accomplishments ==
=== Mixed martial arts ===
- Ultimate Fighting Championship
  - Performance of the Night (One time) vs. Poliana Botelho
  - Tied (Montana De La Rosa) for third most submissions in UFC Women's Flyweight division history (3)
- MMA Fighting
  - 2023 Third Team MMA All-Star

== Mixed martial arts record ==
Professional record breakdown
27 matches	20 wins	7 losses
By knockout	9	1
By submission	8	2
By decision	3	4

Res.	Record	Opponent	Method	Event	Date	Round	Time	Location	Notes
Win	20–7	Gabriella Fernandes	Decision (unanimous)	UFC Fight Night: Cortes-Acosta vs. Walker	November 7, 2026	3	5:00	Las Vegas, Nevada, United States	
Loss	19–7	Jasmine Jasudavicius	Decision (unanimous)	UFC Fight Night: Burns vs. Malott	April 18, 2026	3	5:00	Winnipeg, Manitoba, Canada	
Loss	19–6	Maycee Barber	Decision (unanimous)	UFC 323	December 6, 2025	3	5:00	Las Vegas, Nevada, United States	
Win	19–5	Dione Barbosa	Decision (unanimous)	UFC 319	August 16, 2025	3	5:00	Chicago, Illinois, United States	
Loss	18–5	Viviane Araújo	Decision (unanimous)	UFC 309	November 16, 2024	3	5:00	New York City, New York, United States	
Win	18–4	Ariane Lipski	Decision (unanimous)	UFC on ESPN: Nicolau vs. Perez	April 27, 2024	3	5:00	Las Vegas, Nevada, United States	
Win	17–4	Maryna Moroz	Submission (guillotine choke)	UFC 292	August 19, 2023	1	4:59	Boston, Massachusetts, United States	
Win	16–4	Ketlen Souza	Submission (kneebar)	UFC on ESPN: Kara-France vs. Albazi	June 3, 2023	1	1:45	Las Vegas, Nevada, United States	
Win	15–4	Poliana Botelho	Submission (brabo choke)	UFC Fight Night: Volkov vs. Rozenstruik	June 4, 2022	1	4:55	Las Vegas, Nevada, United States	Performance of the Night.
Win	14–4	Qihui Yan	Submission (guillotine choke)	Dana White's Contender Series 45	October 26, 2021	2	1:44	Las Vegas, Nevada, United States	
Win	13–4	Sidy Rocha	TKO (arm injury)	Standout Fighting Tournament 22	October 31, 2020	1	2:16	São Paulo, Brazil	Bantamweight bout.
Win	12–4	Simone da Silva	Submission (heel hook)	Standout Fighting Tournament 21	February 29, 2020	1	3:07	São Paulo, Brazil	Catchweight (130 lb) bout.
Win	11–4	Geovanna Eduarda	Submission (rear-naked choke)	Cidade da Luta 4	October 26, 2019	1	2:00	Curitiba, Brazil	
Win	10–4	Vitória Ferreira	TKO (punches)	Cidade da Luta 3	August 18, 2019	1	3:24	Curitiba, Brazil	Return to Flyweight.
Loss	9–4	Dione Barbosa	Decision (unanimous)	Katana Fight 9	May 4, 2019	3	5:00	Pinhais, Brazil	
Loss	9–3	Marina Mokhnatkina	Submission (kneebar)	Fight Nights Global 81	December 15, 2017	1	0:58	Omsk, Russia	Bantamweight debut.
Win	9–2	Juliete de Souza	Submission (triangle choke)	Curitiba Top Fight 11	July 1, 2017	3	1:38	Curitiba, Brazil	Flyweight bout.
Win	8–2	Bruna Rosso	TKO (elbows)	Aspera FC 25	October 17, 2015	2	3:28	Curitibanos, Brazil	
Win	7–2	Leticia Ribeiro	Submission (armbar)	Aspera FC 20	June 6, 2015	1	4:24	Navegantes, Brazil	Flyweight bout.
Win	6–2	Cynthia Cândido	TKO (punches)	Aspera FC 17	April 4, 2015	1	2:58	Curitibanos, Brazil	
Loss	5–2	Maryna Moroz	Submission (armbar)	XFC International 7	November 1, 2014	1	3:27	São Paulo, Brazil	XFCI Women's Strawweight Tournament Quarterfinals.
Win	5–1	Geisyele Nascimento	TKO (punches)	Aspera FC 8	June 14, 2014	1	2:11	Paranaguá, Brazil	
Win	4–1	Patricia Marques	TKO (punches)	Aspera FC 7	May 25, 2014	1	1:33	Itajai, Brazil	Strawweight debut.
Win	3–1	Cintia Nunes	KO (head kick)	Aspera FC 6	May 3, 2014	1	0:32	Itapema, Brazil	
Win	2–1	Helaine Ribeiro	KO (elbows)	Victory Iron Girls 1	March 15, 2014	1	4:03	Florianópolis, Brazil	
Win	1–1	Marta Souza	TKO (punches)	Curitiba Fight Pro 1	February 22, 2014	2	N/A	Xaxim, Brazil	
Loss	0–1	Elaine Albuquerque	KO (punch)	Sparta MMA 7	June 15, 2013	3	2:33	Balneário Camboriú, Brazil	Flyweight debut.

== See also ==
- List of current UFC fighters
- List of Dana White's Contender Series alumni
- List of female mixed martial artists
