= JJ Aldrich =

American mixed martial artist (born 1992)

- Born: JJ Ryan Aldrich; September 29, 1992 (age 34); Denver, Colorado, U.S.
- Height: 5 ft 5 in (1.65 m)
- Weight: 125 lb (57 kg; 8.9 st)
- Division: Strawweight (2014–2019); Flyweight (2016, 2019–present)
- Reach: 64 in (163 cm)
- Fighting out of: Westminster, Colorado, U.S.
- Team: Elevation Fight Team (2020–present); 303 Training Center
- Rank: 3rd degree black belt in Taekwondo; Brown belt in Brazilian Jiu-Jitsu

Mixed martial arts record
- Total: 23
- Wins: 15
- By knockout: 3
- By decision: 12
- Losses: 8
- By knockout: 1
- By submission: 2
- By decision: 5

Other information
- Mixed martial arts record from Sherdog

JJ Ryan Aldrich (born September 29, 1992) is an American mixed martial artist who competes in the women’s Flyweight division. She is currently signed with the Ultimate Fighting Championship and has fought for Invicta FC.

== Early life ==
Aldrich was born to a homeless single mother in Denver, Colorado. She grew up in homeless shelters with her mother and older sister, her father had gone to prison before she was born. Years later, Aldrich's mother established a childcare business which allowed the family to move out of the shelter. When JJ was nine, her mother brought the sisters to taekwondo classes at a local recreation center and by the age of thirteen JJ had already earned her black belt. Around those times, Aldrich's taekwondo teachers introduced her to the mixed martial arts gym – 303 Training Center – where she has been training to this day.

Aldrich is of Irish ancestry.

== Mixed martial arts career ==
=== Amateur career ===
In 2010 Aldrich began looking for amateur bouts, eventually capturing several amateur titles in various organizations. During her amateur career she faced future UFC athletes like Raquel Pennington, Kailin Curran and Rachael Ostovich.

=== Invicta ===
JJ Aldrich made her professional MMA career on September 6, 2014, at Invicta FC 8: Waterson vs. Tamada and she won the fight via unanimous decision (30-27, 30–27, 30–26).

Her next fight come one year later on February 27, 2015, at Invicta FC 11: Cyborg vs. Tweet, against Jamie Moyle where she lost in round one via rear-naked choke.

Aldrich was scheduled to face Daniela Kortmann on September 12, 2015, at Invicta FC 14: Evinger vs. Kianzad; however Kortmann was forced to pull from the card due to visa issue and was replaced by Rosa Acevedo. She won the fight via first-round knockout. She was awarded the Performance of the Night bonus award.

=== The Ultimate Fighter ===
JJ Aldrich was a contestant on The Ultimate Fighter: Team Joanna vs. Team Cláudia. In the competition, Aldrich defeated Kristi Lopez by unanimous decision in the elimination round, then lost in the quarterfinals to Tatiana Suarez in round 2 by submission via rear-naked choke.

=== Freestyle Cage Fighting ===
Aldrich faced Kathina Caton in September 2016 at Freestyle Cage Fighting 53. She won the fight in round one via technical knockout.

=== Return to Invicta ===
Aldrich faced Lynn Alvarez on November 18, 2016, at Invicta FC: Evinger vs. Kunitskaya and she defeated Alvarez via unanimous decision. She was awarded her second Invicta Performance of the Night bonus award.

=== Ultimate Fighting Championship ===
She signed with the UFC to fight Juliana Lima for UFC Fight Night 102 in Albany, New York on December 9, 2016. Aldrich was a late replacement for Lima's original opponent, Tatiana Suarez, who had to pull out of the bout due to injury. She lost the fight via unanimous decision.

Aldrich faced South Korean fighter Chan-Mi Jeon in Jeon's UFC debut for UFC Fight Night 110 in Auckland, New Zealand on June 11, 2017. She won the fight via unanimous decision.

Aldrich faced Danielle Taylor on January 14, 2018, at UFC Fight Night 124. She won the fight via unanimous decision.

Aldrich faced Polyana Viana on August 4, 2018, at UFC 227. She won the fight via unanimous decision.

==== Return to flyweight ====
Aldrich returned to flyweight to face Maycee Barber at UFC Fight Night 148 on March 23, 2019. Aldrich lost the fight via technical knockout in round two.

Aldrich faced Lauren Mueller on October 12, 2019, at UFC Fight Night 161 She won the fight via unanimous decision.

Aldrich faced Sabina Mazo on January 18, 2020, at UFC 246. She lost the fight by split decision.

Aldrich faced Cortney Casey on March 13, 2021 at UFC Fight Night 187. She won the fight by split decision.

Aldrich was scheduled to face Tracy Cortez on August 28, 2021, at UFC on ESPN 30. However, Cortez was pulled from the fight due to injury, and she was replaced by Vanessa Demopoulos. Aldrich won the fight via unanimous decision.

Aldrich was scheduled to face Ariane Lipski on March 12, 2022, at UFC Fight Night 203. However, Lipski was removed from her match for undisclosed reasons, and she was replaced by Gillian Robertson. She won the fight via unanimous decision.

Aldrich faced Erin Blanchfield on June 4, 2022, at UFC Fight Night 207. She lost the bout via guillotine choke in the second round.

Aldrich faced Ariane Lipski on March 11, 2023 at UFC Fight Night 221. She lost the fight via unanimous decision.

Aldrich faced Na Liang at UFC Fight Night 225 on August 26, 2023. She won the bout via ground and pound TKO stoppage at the end of the second round.

Aldrich faced Montana De La Rosa, replacing Stephanie Egger, at UFC Fight Night 229 on October 7, 2023. She won the fight via unanimous decision.

Aldrich faced Veronica Hardy at UFC on ESPN 56 on May 11, 2024. She lost the fight by unanimous decision.

Aldrich faced Andrea Lee on March 1, 2025 at UFC Fight Night 253. She won the fight by unanimous decision.

Aldrich was scheduled to face Karine Silva on August 16, 2025 at UFC 319. However, Aldrich withdrew from the fight for undisclosed reasons and was replaced by Dione Barbosa.

Aldrich faced Jamey-Lyn Horth on April 18, 2026 at UFC Fight Night 273. She won the fight by unanimous decision. 9 out of 10 media outlets scored the bout for Horth.

Aldrich faced Regina Tarín on September 12, 2026 at UFC Fight Night 288. She lost the fight by unanimous decision.

== Championships and accomplishments ==
=== Mixed martial arts ===
- Ultimate Fighting Championship
  - Tied (Andrea Lee & Valentina Shevchenko) for second most bouts in UFC Women's Flyweight division history (14)
  - Tied (Valentina Shevchenko & Natália Silva) for second most decision wins in UFC Flyweight division history (7) (behind Katlyn Cerminara)
  - Tied (Krzysztof Jotko & Gray Maynard) for third highest decision wins per win percentage in UFC history (90.9%) (10 decision wins / 11 wins)
  - Forth most total fight time in UFC Flyweight division history (3:10:28)
- Invicta FC
  - Performance of the Night (Two times) vs. Rosa Acevedo and Lynn Alvarez

==== Amateur championships ====
- 2014 – Conflict MMA flyweight champion
- 2013 – Sparta Combat League (SCL) Amateur flyweight champion
- 2012 / 2013 – Destiny MMA Amateur flyweight champion

== Mixed martial arts record ==
Professional record breakdown
23 matches	15 wins	8 losses
By knockout	3	1
By submission	0	2
By decision	12	5

Res.	Record	Opponent	Method	Event	Date	Round	Time	Location	Notes
Loss	15–8	Regina Tarín	Decision (unanimous)	UFC Fight Night: Silva vs. Delgado	September 12, 2026	3	5:00	Glendale, Arizona, United States	
Win	15–7	Jamey-Lyn Horth	Decision (unanimous)	UFC Fight Night: Burns vs. Malott	April 18, 2026	3	5:00	Winnipeg, Manitoba, Canada	
Win	14–7	Andrea Lee	Decision (unanimous)	UFC Fight Night: Kape vs. Almabayev	March 1, 2025	3	5:00	Las Vegas, Nevada, United States	
Loss	13–7	Veronica Hardy	Decision (unanimous)	UFC on ESPN: Lewis vs. Nascimento	May 11, 2024	3	5:00	St. Louis, Missouri, United States	
Win	13–6	Montana De La Rosa	Decision (unanimous)	UFC Fight Night: Dawson vs. Green	October 7, 2023	3	5:00	Las Vegas, Nevada, United States	
Win	12–6	Liang Na	TKO (punches and elbows)	UFC Fight Night: Holloway vs. The Korean Zombie	August 26, 2023	2	4:49	Kallang, Singapore	
Loss	11–6	Ariane Lipski	Decision (unanimous)	UFC Fight Night: Yan vs. Dvalishvili	March 11, 2023	3	5:00	Las Vegas, Nevada, United States	
Loss	11–5	Erin Blanchfield	Submission (guillotine choke)	UFC Fight Night: Volkov vs. Rozenstruik	June 4, 2022	2	2:38	Las Vegas, Nevada, United States	
Win	11–4	Gillian Robertson	Decision (unanimous)	UFC Fight Night: Santos vs. Ankalaev	March 12, 2022	3	5:00	Las Vegas, Nevada, United States	
Win	10–4	Vanessa Demopoulos	Decision (unanimous)	UFC on ESPN: Barboza vs. Chikadze	August 28, 2021	3	5:00	Las Vegas, Nevada, United States	
Win	9–4	Cortney Casey	Decision (split)	UFC Fight Night: Edwards vs. Muhammad	March 13, 2021	3	5:00	Las Vegas, Nevada, United States	
Loss	8–4	Sabina Mazo	Decision (split)	UFC 246	January 18, 2020	3	5:00	Las Vegas, Nevada, United States	
Win	8–3	Lauren Mueller	Decision (unanimous)	UFC Fight Night: Joanna vs. Waterson	October 12, 2019	3	5:00	Tampa, Florida, United States	
Loss	7–3	Maycee Barber	TKO (knee and punches)	UFC Fight Night: Thompson vs. Pettis	March 23, 2019	2	3:01	Nashville, Tennessee, United States	Return to Flyweight.
Win	7–2	Polyana Viana	Decision (unanimous)	UFC 227	August 4, 2018	3	5:00	Los Angeles, California, United States	
Win	6–2	Danielle Taylor	Decision (unanimous)	UFC Fight Night: Stephens vs. Choi	January 14, 2018	3	5:00	St. Louis, Missouri, United States	
Win	5–2	Jeon Chan-mi	Decision (unanimous)	UFC Fight Night: Lewis vs. Hunt	June 11, 2017	3	5:00	Auckland, New Zealand	Catchweight (118 lb) bout; Jeon missed weight.
Loss	4–2	Juliana Lima	Decision (unanimous)	UFC Fight Night: Lewis vs. Abdurakhimov	December 9, 2016	3	5:00	Albany, New York, United States	
Win	4–1	Lynn Alvarez	Decision (unanimous)	Invicta FC 20	November 18, 2016	3	5:00	Kansas City, Missouri, United States	Return to Strawweight. Performance of the Night.
Win	3–1	Kathina Catron	TKO (punches)	Freestyle Cage Fighting 53	September 17, 2016	1	3:01	Tulsa, Oklahoma, United States	Flyweight debut.
Win	2–1	Rosa Acevedo	KO (knee and punches)	Invicta FC 14	September 12, 2015	1	2:24	Kansas City, Missouri, United States	Performance of the Night.
Loss	1–1	Jamie Moyle	Technical Submission (rear-naked choke)	Invicta FC 11	February 27, 2015	1	2:20	Los Angeles, California, United States	
Win	1–0	Delaney Owen	Decision (unanimous)	Invicta FC 8	November 1, 2014	3	5:00	Davenport, Iowa, United States	Strawweight debut.

== See also ==
- List of female mixed martial artists
