= Natália Silva (fighter) =

Brazilian mixed martial arts fighter

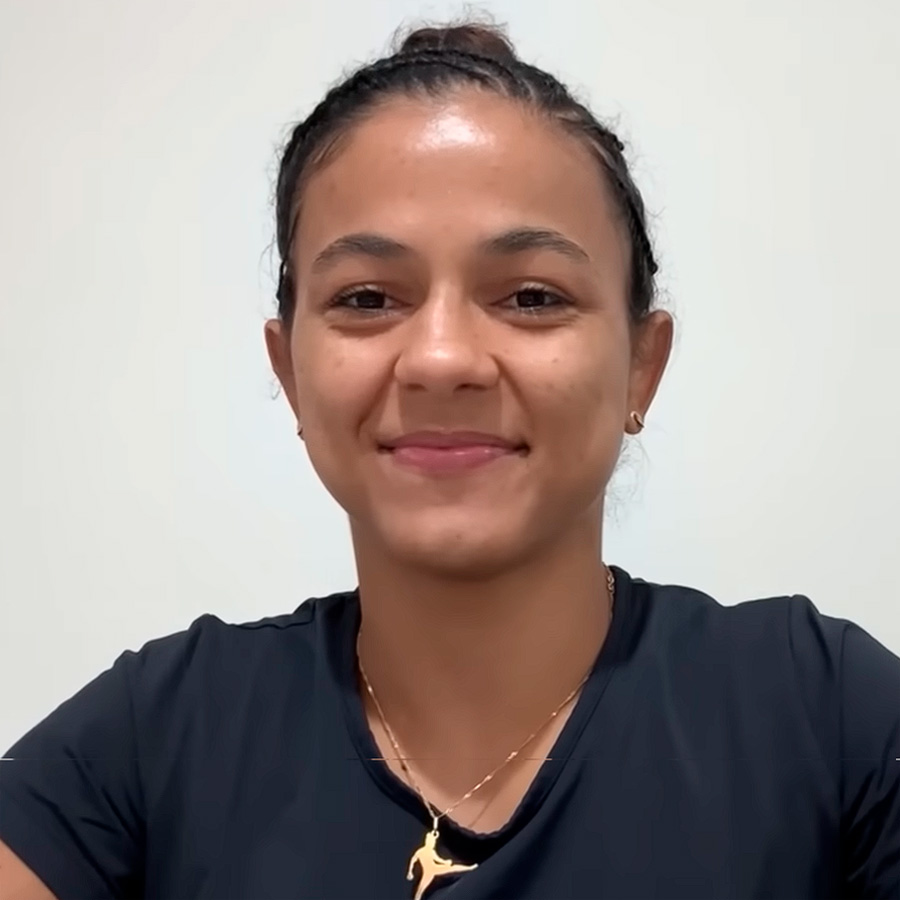
- Silva in 2025
- Born: Natália Miranda Cristina da Silva; February 3, 1997 (age 29); Pingo-d'Água, Minas Gerais, Brazil
- Height: 5 ft 5 in (1.65 m)
- Weight: 125 lb (57 kg; 8 st 13 lb)
- Division: Flyweight (2016–present); Strawweight (2015–2017)
- Reach: 65 in (165 cm)
- Fighting out of: Ipatinga, Minas Gerais, Brazil
- Team: Team Borracha
- Rank: Purple belt in Taekwondo; Blue belt in Brazilian Jiu-Jitsu
- Years active: 2015–present

Mixed martial arts record
- Total: 27
- Wins: 21
- By knockout: 5
- By submission: 7
- By decision: 8
- By disqualification: 1
- Losses: 5
- By knockout: 1
- By submission: 2
- By decision: 2
- Draws: 1

Other information
- Mixed martial arts record from Sherdog

Natália Miranda Cristina da Silva (born February 3, 1997) is a Brazilian professional mixed martial artist who competes in the women's Flyweight division of the Ultimate Fighting Championship (UFC), where she is the current UFC Women's Flyweight Champion. She also fought on Jungle Fight, where she was the Women's Flyweight Champion. As of September 29, 2026, she is #4 in the UFC women's pound-for-pound rankings.

== Background ==
Natália Silva was born in Pingo-d'Água, a small town near Ipatinga, Brazil, and started her journey in martial arts at 16, initially through taekwondo in a voluntary social project. Her passion for competition grew, leading her to transition into MMA after a first fight invitation from friends at the age of 18. This shift allowed her to discover her true potential, connect with fellow fighters, and ultimately led her to the world of professional fighting. Her path eventually crossed with Jungle Fight, opening doors for her to pursue fighting as a career.

== Mixed martial arts career ==
=== Early career ===
Beginning her career mostly only knowing taekwondo, Silva struggled with her transition to MMA, losing a couple of her first bouts due to not knowing any grappling. In 2017 she lost to future UFC strawweight veteran Marina Rodriguez by unanimous decision. In the same year, Silva was invited by Carlos Borracha to fight for Jungle Fight, who generously offered her both a gym to train and a place to live. However, it wasn't until 2019 that Silva had her first shot at the flyweight belt in Jungle Fight.

Facing off against Gabi Marçal, Silva secured a victory in the opening round through a submission, executing a skillful strike and seamlessly transitioning into an arm lock on the ground.

Subsequently, the fighter from Minas Gerais had the task of defending her championship belt against Joice Mara. With mere seconds left in the fourth round, she clinched victory once again, employing an arm lock submission to secure the win.

=== Ultimate Fighting Championship ===
Silva signed with the UFC in 2020, however her debut was delayed after suffering a broken arm and several complications and other injuries.

Silva made her debut with the promotion on June 18, 2022, at UFC on ESPN 37 against Jasmine Jasudavicius, defeating her via unanimous decision.

In her sophomore performance with the promotion, Silva faced Tereza Bledá on November 29, 2022, at UFC Fight Night 215, winning the bout via TKO stoppage due to a spinning back kick and ground and pound in the third round. With this win, Silva earned her first Performance of the Night bonus.

Silva faced Victoria Leonardo on May 20, 2023, at UFC Fight Night 223. She won the fight via technical knockout in round one.

Silva faced her first ranked opponent in Andrea Lee at UFC 292 on August 19, 2023. She won the fight by unanimous decision.

Silva, on her birthday, faced Viviane Araújo on February 3, 2024, at UFC Fight Night 235. She won the fight by unanimous decision.

Silva faced former UFC Women's Strawweight Champion Jéssica Andrade on September 7, 2024 at UFC Fight Night 242. She won the fight by unanimous decision. This fight earned her a Fight of the Night award.

Silva faced former flyweight champion Alexa Grasso at UFC 315 on May 10, 2025 in Montreal, Quebec, Canada. She won the fight by unanimous decision.

Replacing an injured Alexa Grasso, Silva faced former two-time UFC Women's Strawweight Champion Rose Namajunas on January 24, 2026 at UFC 324. She won the fight via unanimous decision. 13 out of 18 media outlets scored the bout for Namajunas.

Silva was scheduled to compete for the UFC Women's Flyweight Championship against champion Valentina Shevchenko on October 3, 2026 at UFC 332. However, Shevchenko withdrew due to injury, which led to her vacating the title and Silva being reassigned to face Wang Cong for the vacant championship. Silva won the championship by unanimous decision.

== Championships and accomplishments ==
=== Mixed martial arts ===
- Ultimate Fighting Championship
  - UFC Women's Flyweight Championship (One time, current)
  - Fight of the Night (One time) vs. Jéssica Andrade
  - Performance of the Night (One time) vs. Tereza Bledá
  - Tied (Valentina Shevchenko) for the longest win streak in UFC Women's Flyweight division history (9)
  - Tied (Jasmine Jasudavicius, Valentina Shevchenko & JJ Aldrich) for second most decision wins in UFC Flyweight division history (9)
  - Tied (Taila Santos, Ariane da Silva, Alexa Grasso & Carli Judice) for most knockdowns landed in UFC Flyweight division history (3)
  - Tied (Maycee Barber & Jasmine Jasudavicius) for third most wins in UFC Women's Flyweight division history (9) (behind Valentina Shevchenko)
  - Fifth highest striking differential in UFC Women's Flyweight division history (2.06)
  - Highest takedown defense percentage in UFC Women's Flyweight division history (90.3%)
  - Holds wins over three former UFC champions — Jéssica Andrade, Alexa Grasso & Rose Namajunas
  - UFC.com Awards
    - 2022: Ranked #7 Newcomer of the Year
- Jungle Fight
  - Jungle Fight Women's Flyweight Championship (One time)
    - One successful title defense

== Mixed martial arts record ==
Professional record breakdown
27 matches	21 wins	5 losses
By knockout	5	1
By submission	7	2
By decision	8	2
By disqualification	1	0
Draws	1	

Res.	Record	Opponent	Method	Event	Date	Round	Time	Location	Notes
Win	21–5–1	Wang Cong	Decision (unanimous)	UFC 332	October 3, 2026	5	5:00	Salt Lake City, Utah, United States	Won the vacant UFC Women's Flyweight Championship.
Win	20–5–1	Rose Namajunas	Decision (unanimous)	UFC 324	January 24, 2026	3	5:00	Las Vegas, Nevada, United States	
Win	19–5–1	Alexa Grasso	Decision (unanimous)	UFC 315	May 10, 2025	3	5:00	Montreal, Quebec, Canada	
Win	18–5–1	Jéssica Andrade	Decision (unanimous)	UFC Fight Night: Burns vs. Brady	September 7, 2024	3	5:00	Las Vegas, Nevada, United States	Fight of the Night.
Win	17–5–1	Viviane Araújo	Decision (unanimous)	UFC Fight Night: Dolidze vs. Imavov	February 3, 2024	3	5:00	Las Vegas, Nevada, United States	
Win	16–5–1	Andrea Lee	Decision (unanimous)	UFC 292	August 19, 2023	3	5:00	Boston, Massachusetts, United States	
Win	15–5–1	Victoria Leonardo	TKO (punches and head kick)	UFC Fight Night: Dern vs. Hill	May 20, 2023	1	2:58	Las Vegas, Nevada, United States	
Win	14–5–1	Tereza Bledá	TKO (spinning back kick and punches)	UFC Fight Night: Nzechukwu vs. Cuțelaba	November 19, 2022	3	1:27	Las Vegas, Nevada, United States	Performance of the Night.
Win	13–5–1	Jasmine Jasudavicius	Decision (unanimous)	UFC on ESPN: Kattar vs. Emmett	June 18, 2022	3	5:00	Austin, Texas, United States	
Win	12–5–1	Joice Mara	Submission (armbar)	Jungle Fight 100	December 28, 2019	4	3:22	Manaus, Brazil	Defended the Jungle Fight Women's Flyweight Championship.
Win	11–5–1	Gabriela Marçal	Submission (armbar)	Jungle Fight 96	October 19, 2019	1	3:34	Belo Horizonte, Brazil	Won the Jungle Fight Women's Flyweight Championship.
Win	10–5–1	Raquel Santiago	Submission (rear-naked choke)	Fight Club MMA 10	June 8, 2019	1	0:40	Montes Claros, Brazil	
Win	9–5–1	Kênia Santana	Submission (armbar)	Jungle Fight: Quinto Fight Night 1	October 6, 2018	1	1:55	Contagem, Brazil	
Win	8–5–1	Ingritt Silva	Submission (armbar)	Fight Club MMA 6	May 12, 2018	2	1:55	Montes Claros, Brazil	
Win	7–5–1	Raquel Santiago	Submission (armbar)	Fight Club MMA 5	March 10, 2018	1	1:04	Bocaiuva, Brazil	Return to Flyweight.
Loss	6–5–1	Marina Rodriguez	Decision (unanimous)	Thunder Fight 13	December 22, 2017	3	5:00	São Paulo, Brazil	
Win	6–4–1	Tarciara Santos	Submission (armbar)	Jungle Fight 92	September 30, 2017	1	2:38	Belo Horizonte, Brazil	Return to Strawweight.
Win	5–4–1	Simone Almeida da Silva	Decision (unanimous)	Vegas Fight Night	March 18, 2017	3	5:00	Betim, Brazil	
Win	4–4–1	Carolina Oliveira	TKO (punches)	Patao Combat MMA 1	December 17, 2016	1	3:32	Manhuaçu, Brazil	
Loss	3–4–1	Daiane Firmino	Decision (unanimous)	Batalha MMA 4	November 19, 2016	3	5:00	São Paulo, Brazil	Flyweight debut.
Win	3–3–1	Gabriela Souza	TKO (punches)	Spartacus HCC: Champions Challenge	July 2, 2016	2	2:40	Ibatiba, Brazil	
Draw	2–3–1	Cris Macfer	Draw (unanimous)	BH Sparta 8	April 15, 2016	3	5:00	Belo Horizonte, Brazil	
Win	2–3	Juliana Costa	KO (punch)	Balloutta Combat MMA 1	January 16, 2016	1	3:55	Lajinha, Brazil	
Loss	1–3	Kenya Miranda	Submission (rear-naked choke)	Ratinho FC 2	September 19, 2015	1	2:50	Caratinga, Brazil	
Loss	1–2	Elaine Leal	Submission (armbar)	BH Sparta 7	August 29, 2015	1	2:00	Belo Horizonte, Brazil	
Win	1–1	Carolina Oliveira	DQ (illegal elbow strikes)	Combat Night Fight 2	August 8, 2015	1	4:26	Janaúba, Brazil	
Loss	0–1	Kenya Miranda	TKO (punches)	Fire Cage: Super Fight Night 1	April 25, 2015	2	3:26	Montes Claros, Brazil	Strawweight debut.

== See also ==
- List of current UFC fighters
- List of female mixed martial artists

Achievements
Vacant Title last held by Valentina Shevchenko	5th UFC Women's Flyweight Champion; October 3, 2026 – present	Incumbent
