= UFC on ESPN: Dolidze vs. Hernandez =

Mixed martial arts event in 2025

- The poster for UFC on ESPN: Dolidze vs. Hernandez
- Promotion: Ultimate Fighting Championship
- Date: August 9, 2025
- Venue: UFC Apex
- City: Enterprise, Nevada, United States
- Attendance: Not announced

Event chronology
UFC on ESPN: Taira vs. Park	UFC on ESPN: Dolidze vs. Hernandez	UFC 319: du Plessis vs. Chimaev

UFC on ESPN: Dolidze vs. Hernandez (also known as UFC on ESPN 72 and UFC Vegas 109) was a mixed martial arts event produced by the Ultimate Fighting Championship that took place on August 9, 2025, at the UFC Apex in Enterprise, Nevada, part of the Las Vegas Valley, United States.

== Background ==
A middleweight bout between Roman Dolidze and former LFA Middleweight Champion Anthony Hernandez headlined this event. They were initially scheduled to compete at UFC 302 in June 2024 but Hernandez was forced out of the bout due to a torn ligament in his hand.

A women's bantamweight bout between former UFC Women's Bantamweight Championship challenger Mayra Bueno Silva and Joselyne Edwards was expected to take place at this event. However, Bueno Silva pulled out due to undisclosed reasons and was replaced by Priscila Cachoeira.

Former UFC Flyweight Championship challengers Alex Perez and Steve Erceg were scheduled to meet in the co-main event. However, Perez pulled out in mid-July due to undisclosed reasons and was replaced by Road to UFC Season 1 flyweight winner Park Hyun-sung. In turn, Park was moved to UFC on ESPN: Taira vs. Park one week prior to compete in the main event after the original opponent Amir Albazi had to withdraw due to injury and was replaced by Ode' Osbourne in a bantamweight bout.

== Results ==
Main card (ESPN / ESPN+)
Weight class				Method	Round	Time	Notes
Middleweight	Anthony Hernandez	def.	Roman Dolidze	Submission (rear-naked choke)	4	2:45
Bantamweight	Steve Erceg	def.	Ode' Osbourne	Decision (unanimous) (29–28, 29–28, 29–28)	3	5:00
Women's Strawweight	Iasmin Lucindo	def.	Angela Hill	Decision (unanimous) (30–27, 30–27, 29–28)	3	5:00
Featherweight	Andre Fili	def.	Christian Rodriguez	Decision (split) (29–28, 28–29, 30–27)	3	5:00
Bantamweight	Jean Matsumoto	def.	Miles Johns	Decision (split) (29–28, 28–29, 29–28)	3	5:00
Middleweight	Christian Leroy Duncan	def.	Eryk Anders	TKO (spinning back elbow and punches)	1	3:53
Preliminary card (ESPN / ESPN+)
Light Heavyweight	Julius Walker	def.	Raffael Cerqueira	Decision (unanimous) (30–27, 30–27, 30–26)	3	5:00
Bantamweight	Elijah Smith	def.	Toshiomi Kazama	KO (slam)	1	4:10
Women's Bantamweight	Joselyne Edwards	def.	Priscila Cachoeira	KO (punches)	1	2:24
Welterweight	Uroš Medić	def.	Gilbert Urbina	KO (punch)	1	1:03
Women's Flyweight	Gabriella Fernandes	def.	Julija Stoliarenko	Decision (unanimous) (30–27, 29–28, 29–28)	3	5:00
Light Heavyweight	Eric McConico	def.	Cody Brundage	Decision (split) (29–28, 27–30, 29–28)	3	5:00

== Bonus awards ==
The following fighters received $50,000 bonuses.

- Fight of the Night: No bonus awarded.
- Performance of the Night: Anthony Hernandez, Christian Leroy Duncan, Elijah Smith, and Joselyne Edwards

== See also ==
- 2025 in UFC
- List of current UFC fighters
- List of UFC events
