= UFC 298 =

2024 mixed martial event

UFC 298: Volkanovski vs. Topuria
- The poster for UFC 298: Volkanovski vs. Topuria
- Promotion: Ultimate Fighting Championship
- Date: February 17, 2024
- Venue: Honda Center
- City: Anaheim, California, United States
- Attendance: 18,186
- Total gate: $7,264,734

Event chronology
UFC Fight Night: Hermansson vs. Pyfer	UFC 298: Volkanovski vs. Topuria	UFC Fight Night: Moreno vs. Royval 2

UFC 298: Volkanovski vs. Topuria was a mixed martial arts event produced by the Ultimate Fighting Championship that took place on February 17, 2024, at the Honda Center in Anaheim, California, United States.

== Background ==
The event marked the promotion's tenth visit to Anaheim and first since UFC 270 in January 2022.

A UFC Featherweight Championship bout between current champion Alexander Volkanovski and Ilia Topuria headlined the event. This bout was originally expected to headline UFC 297 one month prior but was pushed back after Volkanovski was pulled to face UFC Lightweight Champion Islam Makhachev at UFC 294.

A light heavyweight bout between Zhang Mingyang and Brendson Ribeiro was originally scheduled for UFC Fight Night: Song vs. Gutiérrez. However, the bout was postponed due to the event's change of location and fighters facing visa issues and it was rescheduled to take place this event.

A middleweight bout between former UFC Middleweight Champion (also The Ultimate Fighter: The Smashes welterweight winner) Robert Whittaker and former title challenger Paulo Costa took place at the event. The pair was previously expected to headline UFC on ESPN: Whittaker vs. Gastelum in April 2021, but Costa withdrew due to illness. They were also expected to meet at UFC 284 in February 2023, but Costa disputed the official announcement by the promotion indicating he had never signed a contract and the fight would not take place.

A welterweight bout between Ian Machado Garry and Geoff Neal took place at the event. They were previously booked for UFC 292 in August 2023, but Neal withdrew due to undisclosed health reasons. They were also scheduled for UFC 299 but were moved to this event for unknown reasons.

A welterweight bout between Yusaku Kinoshita and Danny Barlow was scheduled for the event. However, Kinoshita was removed from event for undisclosed reasons and was replaced by Josh Quinlan.

A heavyweight bout between Tai Tuivasa and Marcin Tybura was scheduled for this event. However, the bout was moved to headline at UFC Fight Night: Tuivasa vs. Tybura on March 16.

A women's strawweight bout between former UFC Women's Strawweight Championship challenger Amanda Lemos and The Ultimate Fighter: Team Joanna vs. Team Cláudia strawweight winner Tatiana Suarez was scheduled for the event. However, Suarez withdrew from the event due to injury and was replaced by Mackenzie Dern.

Road to UFC Season 1 bantamweight winner Rinya Nakamura was scheduled to face Brady Hiestand in a bantamweight bout. However, Hiestand pulled out due to injury and was replaced by promotional newcomer Carlos Vera, who had previously competed on Season 31 of The Ultimate Fighter the year prior.

A middleweight bout between former LFA Middleweight Champion Anthony Hernandez and Ikram Aliskerov was expected to take place at the event. However, Aliskerov withdrew due to compilations related to an illness and was replaced by Roman Kopylov. The pair was originally expected to take place at UFC Fight Night: Grasso vs. Shevchenko 2 the year prior after Kopylov served as a replacement to Hernandez's original opponent Chris Curtis, but Hernandez pulled out of the event and the bout never materialized.

Tresean Gore was expected to face A.J. Dobson in a middleweight bout at the event. However on February 7, Gore pulled out due to a shoulder injury and the bout was scrapped.

A heavyweight bout between Justin Tafa and Marcos Rogério de Lima was expected to take place at the event. However, Tafa withdrew the day before the event due to injury. He was replaced by his brother Junior Tafa.

During the event's broadcast, former PRIDE Middleweight Champion and 2003 PRIDE Middleweight Grand Prix Champion (also a former UFC Light Heavyweight Championship challenger) Wanderlei Silva was announced as the next "pioneer wing" UFC Hall of Fame inductee during June's International Fight Week festivities in Las Vegas.

== Results ==
Main card
Weight class				Method	Round	Time	Notes
Featherweight	Ilia Topuria	def.	Alexander Volkanovski (c)	KO (punch)	2	3:32	(Note: For the UFC Featherweight Championship.)
Middleweight	Robert Whittaker	def.	Paulo Costa	Decision (unanimous) (29–28, 29–28, 30–27)	3	5:00
Welterweight	Ian Machado Garry	def.	Geoff Neal	Decision (split) (30–27, 28–29, 30–27)	3	5:00
Bantamweight	Merab Dvalishvili	def.	Henry Cejudo	Decision (unanimous) (29–28, 29–28, 29–28)	3	5:00
Middleweight	Anthony Hernandez	def.	Roman Kopylov	Submission (rear-naked choke)	2	3:23
Preliminary card (ESPN / ESPN+)
Women's Strawweight	Amanda Lemos	def.	Mackenzie Dern	Decision (unanimous) (29–28, 29–28, 29–28)	3	5:00
Heavyweight	Marcos Rogério de Lima	def.	Junior Tafa	TKO (leg kick and punches)	2	1:14
Bantamweight	Rinya Nakamura	def.	Carlos Vera	Decision (unanimous) (30–27, 30–27, 30–27)	3	5:00
Light Heavyweight	Zhang Mingyang	def.	Brendson Ribeiro	KO (punches)	1	1:41
Early preliminary card (ESPN+ / UFC Fight Pass)
Welterweight	Danny Barlow	def.	Josh Quinlan	TKO (punches)	3	1:18
Welterweight	Oban Elliott	def.	Val Woodburn	Decision (unanimous) (30–27, 30–27, 29–28)	3	5:00
Women's Flyweight	Miranda Maverick	def.	Andrea Lee	Decision (unanimous) (30–27, 30–27, 29–28)	3	5:00

== Bonus awards ==
The following fighters received $50,000 bonuses.

- Fight of the Night: Amanda Lemos vs. Mackenzie Dern
- Performance of the Night: Ilia Topuria, Anthony Hernandez, and Zhang Mingyang

== Reported payout ==
The following is the reported payout to the fighters as released by the California State Athletic Commission. It does not include sponsor money and also does not include the UFC's traditional "fight night" bonuses.

- Ilia Topuria: $350,000 (no win bonus) def. Alexander Volkanovski: $750,000
- Robert Whittaker: $400,000 (includes $100,000 win bonus) def. Paulo Costa: $250,000
- Ian Machado Garry: $110,000 (includes $55,000 win bonus) def. Geoff Neal: $108,000
- Merab Dvalishvili: $210,000 (includes $105,000 win bonus) def. Henry Cejudo: $150,000
- Anthony Hernandez: $132,000 (includes $66,000 win bonus) def. Roman Kopylov: $80,000
- Amanda Lemos: $160,000 (includes $80,000 win bonus) def. Mackenzie Dern: $200,000
- Marcos Rogério de Lima: $200,000 (includes $100,000 win bonus) def. Junior Tafa: $23,000
- Rinya Nakamura: $46,000 (includes $23,000 win bonus) def. Carlos Vera: $12,000
- Zhang Mingyang: $20,000 (includes $10,000 win bonus) def. Brendson Ribeiro: $10,000
- Danny Barlow: $20,000 (includes $10,000 win bonus) def. Josh Quinlan: $12,000
- Oban Elliott: $20,000 (includes $10,000 win bonus) def. Val Woodburn: $15,000
- Miranda Maverick: $150,000 (includes $75,000 win bonus) def. Andrea Lee: $70,000

== Fight night weights ==
The following is the official weigh-in weights compared to the fight night weights reported by the California State Athletic Commission.

- Alexander Volkanovski: 145 to 166.2 pounds (21.2 lbs) 15%
- Ilia Topuria: 144.5 to 167.2 pounds (22.7 lbs), 16%
- Paulo Costa: 185.5 to 215.2 pounds (29.7 lbs), 16%
- Robert Whittaker: 185.5 to 207.6 pounds (22.1 lbs), 12%
- Ian Machado Garry: 170.5 to 180.6 pounds (10.1 lbs), 6%
- Geoff Neal: 170.5 to 200.8 pounds (30.3 lbs), 18%
- Henry Cejudo: 135 to 150.6 pounds (15.6 lbs), 12%
- Merab Dvalishvili: 135 to 156.8 pounds (21.8), 16%
- Roman Kopylov: 185 to 194 pounds (9 lbs), 5%
- Anthony Hernandez: 185.5 to 203.6 pounds (18.1 lbs), 10%
- Mackenzie Dern: 116 to 127 pounds (11 lbs), 9%
- Amanda Lemos: 115.5 to 123.8 pounds (8.3 lbs), 7%
- Junior Tafa: 249 to 247 pounds (-2 lbs), -1%
- Marcos Rogerio de Lima: 261.5 to 273.4 pounds (11.9 lbs), 5%
- Carlos Vera: 135.5 to 158.6 pounds (23.1 lbs), 17%
- Rinya Nakamura: 135.5 to 147.2 (11.8 lbs), 9%
- Brendson Ribeiro: 205.5 to 219.6 pounds (14.1 lbs) 7%
- Zhang Minyang: 204.5 to 230.2 pounds (25.7 lbs), 13%
- Danny Barlow: 171 to 197.8 pounds (26.8 lbs), 16%
- Josh Quinland: 169 to 187.8 pounds (18.8), 11%
- Val Woodburn: 169.5 to 184 pounds (14.5 lbs), 9%
- Oban Elliott: 170.5 to 185.2 pounds (14.7 lbs), 9%
- Miranda Maverick: 126 to 135.8 pounds (9.8 lbs), 8%
- Andrea Lee: 125.5 to 136.2 pounds (10.7 lbs), 9%

== See also ==
- 2024 in UFC
- List of current UFC fighters
- List of UFC events
