= Tatsuro Taira =

Japanese mixed martial artist (born 2000)

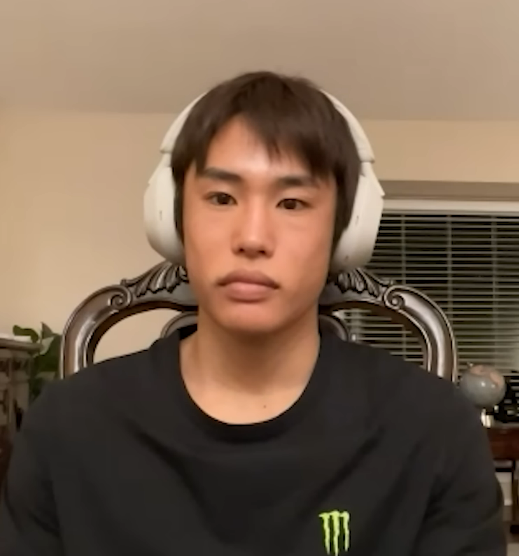
- Born: January 27, 2000 (age 26); Naha, Okinawa, Japan
- Native name: 平良達郎
- Height: 5 ft 7 in (1.70 m)
- Weight: 125 lb (57 kg; 8 st 13 lb)
- Division: Flyweight; Bantamweight
- Reach: 70 in (178 cm)
- Fighting out of: Naha, Okinawa, Japan
- Team: The Blackbelt Japan
- Rank: Purple belt in Brazilian Jiu-Jitsu
- Years active: 2018–present

Mixed martial arts record
- Total: 20
- Wins: 18
- By knockout: 6
- By submission: 8
- By decision: 4
- Losses: 2
- By knockout: 1
- By decision: 1

Other information
- Mixed martial arts record from Sherdog

Tatsuro Taira (平良達郎, Taira Tatsurō; born January 27, 2000) is a Japanese professional mixed martial artist. He currently competes in the Flyweight division of the Ultimate Fighting Championship (UFC). As of July 11, 2026, he is #4 in the Meta UFC flyweight rankings. Taira is the first fighter born in the 2000s to fight in and win a UFC main event.

== Background ==
Taira started playing baseball in the third grade of elementary school but was not passionate about it and took a break in junior high school from club activities. Influenced by his older brother who was learning kickboxing at The Palaestra Okinawa, he started attending the gym in his first year of high school and trained in mixed martial arts under Ryota Matsune's guidance. In 2017, he won the 11th Kyushu Amateur Shooto Championship tournament and the 24th All-Japan Amateur Shooto Championship tournament, and was promoted to the professional ranks with a record of ten wins in ten amateur Shooto fights.

He lists Marlon Vera as his favorite fighter.

== Mixed martial arts career ==
=== Early career ===
On August 3, 2018, he made his professional debut against Yo Otake in the first round of the flyweight division of the Shooto Rookie of the Year Tournament, winning by first-round triangle choke. On November 25, 2018, he rematched Ryu Oyakawa, whom he fought twice as an amateur, in the flyweight final of the Shooto Newcomer's Championship Tournament, winning by first-round guillotine choke. He won the flyweight rookie champion and MVP of the same year.

On September 22, 2019, he fought Takahiro Kobori, ranked #8 in the Shooto World Flyweight Rankings, and won by TKO via ground & pound 60 seconds into the fight.

Taira was next scheduled to face Kiyotaka Shimizu at Shooto 0329 on March 29, 2020. However, the event was cancelled due to the COVID-19 pandemic. The bout was then rebooked to take place at Shooto 1123 on November 23, 2020 and he won the fight via unanimous decision.

Won by rear-naked choke 61 seconds into the match against Yoshiro Maeda, ranked #5 in the world flyweight division by Shooto, on March 20, 2021.

On July 4, 2021, he faced champion Tatsuya Fukuda at the Shooto World Flyweight Championship and won by first-round triangle choke to win the title.

On November 6, 2021, he fought LFN flyweight champion Alfredo Muaiad at VTJ 2021 and won by first-round rear-naked choke.

=== Ultimate Fighting Championship ===
On February 4, 2022, he signed a multi-fight contract with the UFC.

On April 30, 2022, he was scheduled to fight Carlos Candelario at UFC on ESPN 35, but the fight was cancelled after Candelario pulled out due to food poisoning just before the event.

The fight against Candelario was rescheduled for two weeks later on May 14, 2022, at UFC on ESPN 36. He won the fight by unanimous decision.

On October 15, 2022, he faced C.J. Vergara at UFC Fight Night 212, winning by armbar submission in the second round. Taira won the Performance of the Night bonus. The fight took place under the condition that Vergara pay 30% of the fight money to Taira because Vergara weighed 3 pounds over the flyweight limit at the previous day's weigh-in.

On February 4, 2023, Taira faced Jesús Santos Aguilar at UFC Fight Night 218, winning by first-round triangle armbar. In the process, he also won his second consecutive Performance of the Night bonus.

On May 21, 2023, at Professional Shooto 2023 Vol. 3, he vacated his Shooto Flyweight Championship, stating that he could not defend his Shooto title as he would be fighting in the UFC.

On June 24, 2023, he was scheduled to face off against Kleydson Rodrigues at UFC on ABC 5, but the bout was canceled after Rodrigues weighed 3 pounds (1.3 kg) over the flyweight limit the day before the weigh-in.

Taira was rebooked for a week later at UFC 290 against UFC newcomer Édgar Cháirez in a 130-pound catchweight bout. He won the fight via unanimous decision.

Taira was scheduled to face David Dvořák on October 14, 2023, at UFC Fight Night 230. However, the bout was cancelled for unknown reasons.

Taira faced Carlos Hernandez on December 9, 2023, at UFC Fight Night 233 He won the fight via knockout in round two.

Taira was scheduled to face Tim Elliott on May 18, 2024, at UFC Fight Night 241. However, due to Elliott's undisclosed injury, the bout was canceled. Taira was then scheduled to face Joshua Van on June 1, 2024 at UFC 302. The fight was then switched and Taira ended up headlining UFC on ESPN 58 against Alex Perez in the main event on June 15, 2024. Taira won the fight by technical knockout as a result of Perez's knee injury in the second round. This fight earned him another Performance of the Night award.

Taira faced former LFA Flyweight Champion and former UFC Flyweight Championship title contender Brandon Royval on October 12, 2024 in the main event at UFC Fight Night 244. He lost the fight by split decision. This fight earned him his first Fight of the Night award.

Taira was scheduled to face Amir Albazi in the main event on August 2, 2025, at UFC on ESPN 71. However, one week before the event, Albazi withdrew due to an injury and was replaced by Road to UFC Season 1 flyweight winner Park Hyun-sung. Taira won the fight via a face crank submission in the second round, being the first to defeat Park.

Taira faced former two-time UFC Flyweight Champion Brandon Moreno on December 6, 2025, at UFC 323. He won the fight by technical knockout in the second round.

Taira was scheduled to compete for the UFC Flyweight Championship against current champion Joshua Van on April 11, 2026 at UFC 327. However, due to a knee injury, Van withdrew from the bout, so the bout was postponed to May 9, 2026 which took place at UFC 328. He lost the fight via technical knockout in the fifth round. This fight earned him a $100,000 Fight of the Night award.

== Championships and accomplishments ==
- Ultimate Fighting Championship
  - Fight of the Night (Two times) vs. Brandon Royval and Joshua Van
  - Performance of the Night (Three times) vs. C.J. Vergara, Jesús Santos Aguilar and Alex Perez
    - Sixth most Post-Fight bonuses in UFC Flyweight division history (5)
  - First fighter born in the 2000s to win a UFC main event
  - Second most control time percentage in UFC Flyweight division history (52.1%)
  - Second most top-position percentage in UFC Flyweight division history (45.7%)
    - Fifth most top-position time in UFC Flyweight division history (46:51)
  - Tied (Joseph Benavidez, Brandon Moreno & Manel Kape) for fourth most finishes in UFC Flyweight division history (6)
  - Tied (Deiveson Figueiredo & Kyoji Horiguchi) for the sixth longest win streak in UFC Flyweight division history (5)
  - UFC.com Awards
    - 2022: Ranked #4 Newcomer of the Year
    - 2024: Ranked #7 Fight of the Year vs. Brandon Royval
    - 2026: Half-Year Awards: Best Fight of the 1HY vs. Joshua Van
- Shooto
  - Shooto Flyweight Championship (One time)
- MMA Fighting
  - 2023 Second Team MMA All-Star
  - 2025 Third Team MMA All-Star

== Personal life ==
Taira is a baseball fan, and specifically roots for the Tokyo Giants.

== Mixed martial arts record ==
Professional record breakdown
20 matches	18 wins	2 losses
By knockout	6	1
By submission	8	0
By decision	4	1

Res.	Record	Opponent	Method	Event	Date	Round	Time	Location	Notes
Loss	18–2	Joshua Van	TKO (front kick to the body and punches)	UFC 328	May 9, 2026	5	1:32	Newark, New Jersey, United States	For the UFC Flyweight Championship. Fight of the Night.
Win	18–1	Brandon Moreno	TKO (punches)	UFC 323	December 6, 2025	2	2:24	Las Vegas, Nevada, United States	
Win	17–1	Park Hyun-sung	Submission (neck crank)	UFC on ESPN: Taira vs. Park	August 2, 2025	2	1:06	Las Vegas, Nevada, United States	
Loss	16–1	Brandon Royval	Decision (split)	UFC Fight Night: Royval vs. Taira	October 12, 2024	5	5:00	Las Vegas, Nevada, United States	Fight of the Night.
Win	16–0	Alex Perez	TKO (knee injury)	UFC on ESPN: Perez vs. Taira	June 15, 2024	2	2:59	Las Vegas, Nevada, United States	Performance of the Night.
Win	15–0	Carlos Hernandez	TKO (punches)	UFC Fight Night: Song vs. Gutiérrez	December 9, 2023	2	0:55	Las Vegas, Nevada, United States	
Win	14–0	Édgar Cháirez	Decision (unanimous)	UFC 290	July 8, 2023	3	5:00	Las Vegas, Nevada, United States	Catchweight (130 lb) bout.
Win	13–0	Jesús Santos Aguilar	Submission (triangle armbar)	UFC Fight Night: Lewis vs. Spivac	February 4, 2023	1	4:20	Las Vegas, Nevada, United States	Performance of the Night.
Win	12–0	C.J. Vergara	Submission (armbar)	UFC Fight Night: Grasso vs. Araújo	October 15, 2022	2	4:19	Las Vegas, Nevada, United States	Catchweight (129 lb) bout; Vergara missed weight. Performance of the Night.
Win	11–0	Carlos Candelario	Decision (unanimous)	UFC on ESPN: Błachowicz vs. Rakić	May 14, 2022	3	5:00	Las Vegas, Nevada, United States	
Win	10–0	Alfredo Muaiad	Submission (rear-naked choke)	Vale Tudo Japan 2021	November 6, 2021	1	4:12	Tokyo, Japan	Catchweight (130 lb) bout.
Win	9–0	Ryuya Fukuda	Submission (triangle choke)	Shooto: 2021 Vol. 4	July 4, 2021	1	4:31	Osaka, Japan	Return to Flyweight. Won the Shooto Flyweight Championship.
Win	8–0	Yoshiro Maeda	Technical Submission (rear-naked choke)	Shooto: 2021 Vol. 2	March 20, 2021	1	1:01	Tokyo, Japan	
Win	7–0	Kiyotaka Shimizu	Decision (unanimous)	Shooto: 2020 Vol. 7	November 23, 2020	3	5:00	Tokyo, Japan	Bantamweight debut.
Win	6–0	Jared Almazan	TKO (punches)	Shooto: 2020 Vol. 1	January 26, 2020	2	0:19	Tokyo, Japan	Catchweight (130 lb) bout.
Win	5–0	Yamato Takagi	TKO (punches)	Shooto: The Shooto Okinawa Vol. 2	November 3, 2019	2	4:40	Okinawa, Japan	
Win	4–0	Takahiro Kohori	TKO (punches)	Shooto: Border Season 11 the 3rd	September 22, 2019	1	1:00	Osaka, Japan	Return to Flyweight.
Win	3–0	Yuto Sekiguchi	Decision (unanimous)	Shooto: Gig Tokyo 27	June 8, 2019	2	5:00	Tokyo, Japan	Strawweight debut.
Win	2–0	Ryo Oyakawa	Submission (guillotine choke)	Shooto: The Shooto Okinawa Vol. 1	November 25, 2018	1	3:24	Okinawa, Japan	
Win	1–0	Yo Otake	Submission (triangle choke)	Shooto: This Is Shooto Vol. 2	August 3, 2018	1	2:46	Tokyo, Japan	Flyweight debut.

== See also ==
- List of current UFC fighters
- List of male mixed martial artists
