= UFC on ESPN: Taira vs. Park =

Mixed martial arts event in 2025

- The poster for UFC on ESPN: Taira vs. Park
- Promotion: Ultimate Fighting Championship
- Date: August 2, 2025
- Venue: UFC Apex
- City: Enterprise, Nevada, United States
- Attendance: Not announced

Event chronology
UFC on ABC: Whittaker vs. de Ridder	UFC on ESPN: Taira vs. Park	UFC on ESPN: Dolidze vs. Hernandez

UFC on ESPN: Taira vs. Park (also known as UFC on ESPN 71 and UFC Vegas 108) was a mixed martial arts event produced by the Ultimate Fighting Championship that took place on August 2, 2025, at the UFC Apex in Enterprise, Nevada, part of the Las Vegas Valley, United States.

== Background ==
A flyweight bout between Amir Albazi and Tatsuro Taira was scheduled to headline this event. However, one week before the event, Albazi withdrew due to injury and was replaced by Road to UFC Season 1 flyweight winner Park Hyun-sung, who was originally scheduled to compete a week later against former UFC Flyweight Championship challenger Steve Erceg.

A lightweight bout between Esteban Ribovics and Elves Brener took place at the event. They were previously scheduled to face each other at UFC Fight Night: Almeida vs. Lewis in November 2023, but Ribovics withdrew due to an accident.

A flyweight bout between former LFA Flyweight Champion Felipe Bunes and André Lima was scheduled for this event. However, Lima withdrew from the fight due to an undisclosed injury and was replaced by Rafael Estevam.

A middleweight bout between Torrez Finney and former LFA Middleweight Champion Azamat Bekoev was scheduled for this event. However, Finney withdrew from the fight due to an injury and was replaced by promotional newcomer Yousri Belgaroui. In turn, the bout was scrapped and postponed to October 18 at UFC Fight Night 262 as Belgaroui was unable to get a visa in time.

A welterweight bout between Neil Magny and Elizeu Zaleski dos Santos took place at this event. They were originally reportedly scheduled to face each other in May 2019, at UFC Fight Night: dos Anjos vs. Lee, but the matchup did not materialize as Zaleski dos Santos announced that he had not been contacted by the UFC about it.

A featherweight bout between Austin Bashi and Francis Marshall was scheduled for this event. However, Marshall had to withdraw due to an injury and was replaced by promotional newcomer John Yannis.

A lightweight bout between Grant Dawson and Joel Álvarez was reportedly scheduled for this event. However, for unknown reasons, the bout was not formally announced.

At the weigh-ins, two fighters missed weight:

- Tresean Gore weighed in at 189.5 pounds, three and a half pounds over the middleweight non-title fight limit.
- Rafael Estevam weighed in at 130 pounds, four pounds over the flyweight non-title fight limit.

Gore and Estevam's bouts proceeded at catchweight. Both fighters were fined 25 percent of their individual purses which went to their opponents Rodolfo Vieira and Felipe Bunes, respectively.

== Results ==
Main card (ESPN / ESPN+)
Weight class				Method	Round	Time	Notes
Flyweight	Tatsuro Taira	def.	Park Hyun-sung	Submission (face crank)	2	1:06
Lightweight	Chris Duncan	def.	Mateusz Rębecki	Decision (unanimous) (29–28, 29–28, 30–27)	3	5:00
Lightweight	Esteban Ribovics	def.	Elves Brener	Decision (unanimous) (29–28, 30–27, 30–27)	3	5:00
Women's Bantamweight	Karol Rosa	def.	Nora Cornolle	Decision (unanimous) (30–27, 29–27, 29–27)	3	5:00
Welterweight	Neil Magny	def.	Elizeu Zaleski dos Santos	TKO (punches)	2	4:39
Featherweight	Kevin Vallejos	def.	Danny Silva	Decision (unanimous) (29–28, 30–27, 30–27)	3	5:00
Preliminary card (ESPN / ESPN+)
Bantamweight	Rinya Nakamura	def.	Nathan Fletcher	TKO (body kick and punches)	1	1:02
Catchweight (189.5 lb)	Rodolfo Vieira	def.	Tresean Gore	Decision (unanimous) (29–28, 30–27, 30–27)	3	5:00
Middleweight	Andrey Pulyaev	def.	Nick Klein	TKO (body kick and punches)	2	1:31
Featherweight	Austin Bashi	def.	John Yannis	Submission (rear-naked choke)	1	3:39
Catchweight (130 lb)	Rafael Estevam	def.	Felipe Bunes	Decision (unanimous) (29–28, 29–28, 29–28)	3	5:00
Women's Strawweight	Piera Rodríguez	def.	Ketlen Souza	Decision (split) (29–28, 28–29, 29–28)	3	5:00

== Bonus awards ==
The following fighters received $50,000 bonuses.

- Fight of the Night: Chris Duncan vs. Mateusz Rębecki and Esteban Ribovics vs. Elves Brener
- Performance of the Night: No bonus awarded.

== See also ==
- 2025 in UFC
- List of current UFC fighters
- List of UFC events
