= Anshul Jubli =

Indian mixed martial arts fighter

- Born: 13 January 1995 (age 31); Dehradun, Uttarakhand, India
- Other names: King of Lions
- Height: 6 ft 0 in (1.83 m)
- Weight: 156 lb (71 kg; 11 st)
- Division: Lightweight
- Reach: 69 in (175 cm)
- Stance: Orthodox
- Fighting out of: New Delhi, India
- Team: Soma Fight Club
- Trainer: Mike Ikilei (Striking); Youssef Webhe (MMA); Siddharth Singh (Grappling)
- Years active: 2019–present

Mixed martial arts record
- Total: 9
- Wins: 7
- By knockout: 2
- By submission: 1
- By decision: 4
- Losses: 2
- By knockout: 2

Amateur record
- Total: 13
- Wins: 13
- Losses: 0

Other information
- University: Hemwati Nandan Bahuguna Garhwal University
- Mixed martial arts record from Sherdog

Anshul Jubli (born 13 January 1995) is an Indian professional mixed martial artist who currently competes in the Lightweight division of the Ultimate Fighting Championship (UFC). Jubli became the second Indian citizen to get a UFC contract, after Bharat Khandare.

== Background ==
Jubli is a native of a village called Bhatwari, in the Uttarkashi district of Garhwal division, in the north Indian state of Uttarakhand. His roots are from Jubbal in Shimla district in Himachal Pradesh, that's why his ancestors adopted the surname Jubli. His father was employed in the Border Security Force, and due to his father's transfers, he spent his childhood in various states of India. His family eventually settled down in Dehradun. To get a job in the Indian Army, he began preparing for Combined Defense Service and the Services Selection Board examinations. In 2015, Jubli started watching MMA upon his friend's recommendation. He received a Bachelor of Science degree in mathematics from the Hemwati Nandan Bahuguna Garhwal University and worked as a school teacher before turning to mixed martial arts.

Upon watching videos of Firas Zahabi, a Lebanese-Canadian MMA teacher as well as Brazilian jiu-jitsu and MMA instructor John Danaher, Jubli and his friend mimicked moves to learn. His hometown at the time had no training or coaching facilities, Jubli thereby joined Crosstrain Fight Club in Delhi, an MMA club under Siddharth Singh.

== Mixed martial arts career ==
In 2019, he debuted in professional MMA at Matrix Fight Night (MFN), an MMA promotion founded by Bollywood actor Tiger Shroff. In his first fight on 29 June 2019, he won against Sanjeet Budhwar by decision at Mumbai. On 20 December he defeated Amit Raj Kumar by judges decision. On 28 February 2020, he won against Rajith Chandran by TKO in 4:44 of round one at Dubai, in same year on 15 December he defeated Srikant Shekhar by decision after 3 round fight at Dubai and at 24 September defeated Mohammad Mahmoudian in round 1. He learnt boxing at Tokas Boxing Club under Rohit Tokas, an amateur boxer.

=== Road to UFC ===
In 2022, he entered the Road to UFC Lightweight Tournament and advanced to the semifinals after his opponent Patrick Sho Usami missed weight and was pulled from the tournament.

In the semi-finals, Jubli defeated South Korean Kyung Pyo Kim via split decision. He then faced Jeka Saragih of Indonesia in the finals at UFC Fight Night: Lewis vs. Spivac. Jubli won the fight via TKO in the second round. This match earned him the Performance of the Night and a contract with the UFC, becoming only the second fighter from India to be signed by the organization.

=== Ultimate Fighting Championship ===
Jubli faced Mike Breeden on 21 October 2023, at UFC 294. At the weigh-ins, Breeden weighed in at 159.5 pounds, three and a half pounds over the lightweight non-title fight limit. The bout proceeded at catchweight with Breeden being fined 30% of his purse, which went to Jubli. Jubli lost the fight via knockout in round three.

Jubli was scheduled to face Maheshate Hayisaer on 27 April 2024, at UFC on ESPN 55. However, Jubli pulled out for unknown reasons and was replaced by Gabriel Benítez.

Jubli faced Quillan Salkilld on 9 February 2025, at UFC 312. He lost the fight by technical knockout 19 seconds into the first round.

== Championships and accomplishments ==
=== Professional MMA ===
- Ultimate Fighting Championship
  - Performance of the Night (One time) vs. Jeka Saragih
  - Road to UFC Season 1 Lightweight Tournament Winner

=== Amateur MMA ===
- BodyPower India Open MMA Tournament
  - BodyPower Light Heavyweight Tournament Winner (2016)

== Mixed martial arts record ==
=== Professional ===
Professional record breakdown
| 9 matches | 7 wins | 2 losses |
| By knockout | 2 | 2 |
| By submission | 1 | 0 |
| By decision | 4 | 0 |

| Res. | Record | Opponent | Method | Event | Date | Round | Time | Location | Notes |
|---|---|---|---|---|---|---|---|---|---|
| Loss | 7–2 | Quillan Salkilld | TKO (punch) | UFC 312 | 9 February 2025 | 1 | 0:19 | Sydney, Australia | |
| Loss | 7–1 | Mike Breeden | KO (punches) | UFC 294 | 21 October 2023 | 3 | 3:00 | Abu Dhabi, United Arab Emirates | Catchweight (159.5 lb) bout; Breeden missed weight. |
| Win | 7–0 | Jeka Saragih | TKO (punches and elbows) | UFC Fight Night: Lewis vs. Spivac | 4 February 2023 | 2 | 3:44 | Las Vegas, Nevada, United States | Won the Road to UFC Season 1 Lightweight Tournament. Performance of the Night. |
| Win | 6–0 | Kim Kyung-pyo | Decision (split) | Road to UFC Season 1: Episode 6 | 23 October 2022 | 3 | 5:00 | Abu Dhabi, United Arab Emirates | Road to UFC Season 1 Lightweight Tournament semifinal. |
| Win | 5–0 | Mohammad Mahmoudian | Submission (arm-triangle-choke) | Matrix Fight Night 6 | 24 September 2021 | 1 | 2:17 | Dubai, United Arab Emirates | |
| Win | 4–0 | Srikant Sekhar | Decision (unanimous) | Matrix Fight Night 5 | 15 December 2020 | 3 | 5:00 | Dubai, United Arab Emirates | |
| Win | 3–0 | Rajith Chandran | TKO (punches) | Matrix Fight Night 4 | 28 February 2020 | 1 | 4:44 | Dubai, United Arab Emirates | |
| Win | 2–0 | Amit Raj Kumar | Decision (unanimous) | Matrix Fight Night 3 | 20 December 2019 | 3 | 5:00 | Mumbai, India | |
| Win | 1–0 | Sanjeet Budhwar | Decision (unanimous) | Matrix Fight Night 2 | 29 June 2019 | 3 | 5:00 | New Delhi, India | Lightweight debut. |

== See also ==
- List of current UFC fighters
- List of male mixed martial artists
- Sport in India
