= UFC Fight Night: Lewis vs. Spivac =

Mixed martial arts event in 2023

- The poster for UFC Fight Night: Lewis vs. Spivac
- Promotion: Ultimate Fighting Championship
- Date: February 4, 2023
- Venue: UFC Apex
- City: Enterprise, Nevada, United States
- Attendance: Not announced

Event chronology
UFC 283: Teixeira vs. Hill	UFC Fight Night: Lewis vs. Spivac	UFC 284: Makhachev vs. Volkanovski

UFC Fight Night: Lewis vs. Spivac (also known as UFC Fight Night 218, UFC on ESPN+ 76 and UFC Vegas 68) was a mixed martial arts event produced by the Ultimate Fighting Championship that took place on February 4, 2023, at the UFC Apex facility in Enterprise, Nevada, part of the Las Vegas Metropolitan Area, United States.

== Background ==
The organization originally targeted a return to Seoul, South Korea to host the event. Instead, the event was moved to the UFC Apex in Enterprise, Nevada.

A heavyweight bout between former UFC Heavyweight Championship challenger Derrick Lewis and Serghei Spivac headlined the event. The pair was previously expected to headline UFC Fight Night: Nzechukwu vs. Cuțelaba in November 2022, but while the event was in progress, Lewis was forced to withdraw due to non-COVID, non-weight-cutting illness, and the bout was cancelled. However, Lewis later confirmed that he had, in fact, contracted COVID-19.

A women's Strawweight bout between Loma Lookboonmee and Elise Reed was scheduled for the event. However, the pair was moved to UFC 284 for undisclosed reasons.

The four finals of Road to UFC Season 1 took place at this event.

ESPN reporter Laura Sanko made her UFC color commentary debut at this event, becoming the first female color commentator in the modern UFC era to call an event from the booth.

A women's flyweight bout between Kim Ji-yeon and Mandy Böhm was expected to take place at the event. However, Böhm was forced to withdraw before the event started due to illness, and the bout was cancelled.

== Results ==
Main card (ESPN+)
Weight class				Method	Round	Time	Notes
Heavyweight	Serghei Spivac	def.	Derrick Lewis	Submission (arm-triangle choke)	1	3:05
Light Heavyweight	Devin Clark	def.	Jung Da-un	Decision (unanimous) (30–27, 30–27, 30–27)	3	5:00
Heavyweight	Marcin Tybura	def.	Blagoy Ivanov	Decision (unanimous) (30–27, 29–28, 29–28)	3	5:00
Featherweight	Choi Doo-ho	vs.	Kyle Nelson	Draw (majority) (29–27, 28–28, 28–28)	3	5:00	(Note: Choi was deducted 1 point in Round 3 due to a headbutt.)
Welterweight	Adam Fugitt	def.	Yusaku Kinoshita	TKO (elbows)	1	4:36
Preliminary card (ESPN+)
Lightweight	Anshul Jubli	def.	Jeka Saragih	TKO (punches and elbows)	2	3:44	(Note: Road to UFC Lightweight Tournament Final.)
Featherweight	Lee Jeong-yeong	def.	Yi Zha	Decision (split) (27–30, 29–28, 29–28)	3	5:00	(Note: Road to UFC Featherweight Tournament Final.)
Bantamweight	Rinya Nakamura	def.	Toshiomi Kazama	KO (punch)	1	0:33	(Note: Road to UFC Bantamweight Tournament Final.)
Flyweight	Park Hyun-sung	def.	Choi Seung-guk	Submission (rear-naked choke)	3	3:11	(Note: Road to UFC Flyweight Tournament Final.)
Middleweight	Park Jun-yong	def.	Denis Tiuliulin	Technical submission (rear-naked choke)	1	4:05
Flyweight	Tatsuro Taira	def.	Jesús Santos Aguilar	Submission (triangle armbar)	1	4:20

== Bonus awards ==
The following fighters received $50,000 bonuses.

- Fight of the Night: No bonus awarded.
- Performance of the Night: Serghei Spivac, Anshul Jubli, Rinya Nakamura, and Tatsuro Taira

== See also ==
- List of UFC events
- List of current UFC fighters
- 2023 in UFC
