= Amir Albazi =

Iraqi mixed martial artist (born 1993)

- Born: Amir Yahya Abdulamir Al-Bazi; October 27, 1993 (age 33); Baghdad, Iraq
- Native name: أمير البازي
- Other names: The Prince
- Height: 5 ft 5 in (1.65 m)
- Weight: 125 lb (57 kg; 8.9 st)
- Division: Flyweight (2017, 2021-present Bantamweight (2009-2016, 2020)
- Reach: 68 in (173 cm)
- Fighting out of: Baghdad, Iraq
- Team: Fightzone Stockholm (formerly); London Shootfighters (2013–2021); Xtreme Couture Mixed Martial Arts (2021–2024); Fight Ready MMA (2024–2025); Atreus MMA (2025–2026); Great Britain Top Team (2026–present)
- Rank: Purple belt in Brazilian Jiu-Jitsu
- Years active: 2009–present

Mixed martial arts record
- Total: 21
- Wins: 18
- By knockout: 5
- By submission: 10
- By decision: 3
- Losses: 3
- By decision: 3

Other information
- University: University of Roehampton
- Mixed martial arts record from Sherdog

Amir Yahya Abdulamir Al-Bazi (Arabic: أمير يحيى عبد الأمير البازي; born October 27, 1993), known as Amir Albazi, is an Iraqi professional mixed martial artist who currently competes in the Flyweight division of the Ultimate Fighting Championship (UFC). As of October 24, 2026, he is #8 in the Meta UFC flyweight rankings.

== Early life and education ==
Amir was born in Baghdad. When he was seven years old, he fled Baghdad in the middle of the night alongside his family, then moving to Syria, where Amir saw his father for the first time since he was a toddler. The family stayed in Syria for a year and a half, before moving to Sweden.

Amir's family settled in Bredäng, a district in Stockholm in which immigrants and refugees made up 60% of the population. Amir got into a lot of fights and trouble as a kid, resulting in his joining a street gang as a teenager. His interest in mixed martial arts happened overnight as he watched an old UFC fight on the television. Having been impressed by this new type of professional fighting, Amir looked up the cheapest MMA gym and signed up the next day. Albazi moved to London in 2013, and graduated from University of Roehampton with a degree in sports science.

== Mixed martial arts career ==
=== Early career ===
Amir's first fight came in the World Ultimate Full Contact 15, he submitted Pavlo Kulish in 59 seconds, and subsequently went on an 8 bout win streak to start his MMA career before moving to Bellator, where he extended that streak to 10 bouts after defeating Jamie Powell and Iurie Bejenari. Amir's first loss came in the Middle Eastern promotion series Brave CF to Jose "Shorty" Torres. Amir rebounded from his loss by defeating Ryan Curtis in Brave CF 29.

=== Ultimate Fighting Championship ===
Albazi made his UFC debut on short notice on July 18, 2020, against Malcolm Gordon at UFC Fight Night 172. Amir defeated Gordon by submission 4 minutes and 42 seconds into the first round.

Albazi was expected to face Raulian Paiva on October 31, 2020, at UFC Fight Night 181. However, Paiva pulled out of the fight on 11 September citing a knee injury, resulting in Albazi's removal from the card.

Amir was then scheduled to face Zhalgas Zhumagulov at UFC on ESPN 18 on November 28, 2020, but Zhumagulov pulled out due to visa issues. The bout was rescheduled for UFC 257 on January 24, 2021. Albazi won the bout via unanimous decision.

He was then scheduled to face Ode' Osbourne at UFC on ESPN 26 on July 17, 2021. However, Albazi withdrew from the bout due to undisclosed reasons.

Albazi was next scheduled to face Tim Elliott at UFC on ESPN 38 on June 25, 2022. However, Elliott pulled out in mid June due to undisclosed reasons and the bout was scrapped.

Albazi faced Francisco Figueiredo on August 20, 2022, at UFC 278. He won the bout via rear-naked choke at the end of the first round.

Albazi was scheduled to face Alex Perez on December 17, 2022, at UFC Fight Night 216. However, with Perez withdrawing from the fight, Albazi wound up scheduled against Brandon Royval instead. In late November, Royval pulled out of the bout due to a broken wrist, and was replaced by promotional newcomer Alessandro Costa, former LUX Fight League flyweight champion. Albazi won the fight via knockout in round three.

Albazi faced Kai Kara-France on June 3, 2023, at UFC on ESPN 46. He won the fight via a split decision. The decision drew criticism, and 19 out of 21 media outlets scored the bout in favor of Kara-France.

Albazi was expected to face two-time former UFC Flyweight champion Brandon Moreno at UFC Fight Night 237 on February 24, 2024. However, Albazi withdrew due to a neck injury and was replaced by former title challenger Brandon Royval.

It was reported that the bout between Albazi and Brandon Moreno was re-scheduled to take place on November 9, 2024 in the main event at UFC Fight Night 247. However, the bout was moved to November 2, 2024 at UFC Fight Night 246. Albazi lost the fight by unanimous decision.

Albazi was scheduled to face Tatsuro Taira in the main event on August 2, 2025 at UFC on ESPN 71. However, one week before the event, Albazi withdrew due to an injury and was replaced by Road to UFC Season 1 flyweight winner Park Hyun-sung.

Albazi faced Kyoji Horiguchi on February 7, 2025, at UFC Fight Night 266. He lost the fight by unanimous decision.

Albazi faced Alessandro Costa in a rematch on November 21, 2026 at UFC Fight Night 294. Despite being deducted one point in the second round for a fence grab, Albazi went on to win the bout via a one arm rear-naked choke submission late into the third round. The win earned him his first $100,000 Performance of the Night award.

== Personal life ==
In an interview with BBC dated 16 December 2022, Albazi stated that he wants to become the first Arab UFC champion and plans to eventually return to Iraq and develop MMA there.

Albazi is trilingual and has stated that he can speak Arabic, Swedish and English. He has described himself as a "history geek" who enjoys studying conspiracy theories, with a special interest in pyramidology.

In 2023, Albazi underwent heart surgery for supraventricular tachycardia, and in 2024, he had to undergo another surgery, this time for his injured spine.

== Championships and accomplishments ==
- Ultimate Challenge MMA
  - UCMMA Bantamweight Championship (one time; former)
- FightStar Championship
  - FSC Bantamweight Championship (one time; former)
- Ultimate Fighting Championship
  - Performance of the Night (One time) vs. Alessandro Costa

== Mixed martial arts record ==
Professional record breakdown
| 21 matches | 18 wins | 3 losses |
| By knockout | 5 | 0 |
| By submission | 10 | 0 |
| By decision | 3 | 3 |

| Res. | Record | Opponent | Method | Event | Date | Round | Time | Location | Notes |
|---|---|---|---|---|---|---|---|---|---|
| Win | 18–3 | Alessandro Costa | Submission (rear-naked choke) | UFC Fight Night: Procházka vs. Stirling | November 21, 2026 | 3 | 4:34 | Al Rayyan, Qatar | Albazi was deducted one point in round 2 due to grabbing the fence. Performance of the Night. |
| Loss | 17–3 | Kyoji Horiguchi | Decision (unanimous) | UFC Fight Night: Bautista vs. Oliveira | February 7, 2026 | 3 | 5:00 | Las Vegas, Nevada, United States | |
| Loss | 17–2 | Brandon Moreno | Decision (unanimous) | UFC Fight Night: Moreno vs. Albazi | November 2, 2024 | 5 | 5:00 | Edmonton, Alberta, Canada | |
| Win | 17–1 | Kai Kara-France | Decision (split) | UFC on ESPN: Kara-France vs. Albazi | June 3, 2023 | 5 | 5:00 | Las Vegas, Nevada, United States | |
| Win | 16–1 | Alessandro Costa | KO (punches) | UFC Fight Night: Cannonier vs. Strickland | December 17, 2022 | 3 | 2:13 | Las Vegas, Nevada, United States | |
| Win | 15–1 | Francisco Figueiredo | Submission (rear-naked choke) | UFC 278 | August 20, 2022 | 1 | 4:34 | Salt Lake City, Utah, United States | |
| Win | 14–1 | Zhalgas Zhumagulov | Decision (unanimous) | UFC 257 | January 23, 2021 | 3 | 5:00 | Abu Dhabi, United Arab Emirates | |
| Win | 13–1 | Malcolm Gordon | Submission (triangle choke) | UFC Fight Night: Figueiredo vs. Benavidez 2 | July 18, 2020 | 1 | 4:42 | Abu Dhabi, United Arab Emirates | Bantamweight bout. |
| Win | 12–1 | Ryan Curtis | Submission (kimura) | Brave CF 29 | November 15, 2019 | 1 | 2:24 | Isa Town, Bahrain | |
| Loss | 11–1 | Jose Torres | Decision (unanimous) | Brave CF 23 | April 19, 2019 | 3 | 5:00 | Amman, Jordan | |
| Win | 11–0 | Iuri Bejenari | Submission (rear-naked choke) | Bellator 200 | May 25, 2018 | 1 | 3:21 | London, England | |
| Win | 10–0 | Jamie Powell | Decision (unanimous) | Bellator 179 | May 19, 2017 | 3 | 5:00 | London, England | Flyweight debut. |
| Win | 9–0 | Dino Gambatesa | Submission (kimura) | FightStar Championship 8 | December 10, 2016 | 1 | 4:30 | London, England | Won the FSC Bantamweight Championship. |
| Win | 8–0 | Rafał Czechowski | Submission (rear-naked choke) | Scandinavian Fight Nights 1 | June 4, 2016 | 2 | N/A | Solna, Sweden | |
| Win | 7–0 | Niko Gjoka | TKO (slam) | Ultimate Challenge MMA 44 | September 5, 2015 | 2 | 2:21 | London, England | Won the vacant UCMMA Bantamweight Championship. |
| Win | 6–0 | Ondřej Moravec | TKO (punches) | Caveam: Bitva Roku 2015 | March 19, 2015 | 1 | 4:34 | Prague, Czech Republic | |
| Win | 5–0 | Salih Kulucan | Submission (kimura) | Ultimate Challenge MMA 41 | November 8, 2014 | 2 | 2:30 | London, England | |
| Win | 4–0 | Ally McCrae | Submission (rear-naked choke) | Scottish Fight Challenge 3 | October 10, 2010 | 2 | 0:00 | Stirling, Scotland | |
| Win | 3–0 | Bagandov Murada | TKO (punches) | World Ultimate Full Contact 16 | September 4, 2010 | 1 | 3:00 | Viseu, Portugal | |
| Win | 2–0 | Andre Batista | TKO (punches) | World Ultimate Full Contact 15 | August 22, 2009 | 1 | 3:35 | Viseu, Portugal | |
| Win | 1–0 | Pavlo Kulish | Submission (rear-naked choke) | World Ultimate Full Contact 15 | August 22, 2009 | 1 | 0:59 | Viseu, Portugal | Bantamweight debut. |

== Submission grappling record ==
2 Matches, 1 Win, 1 Loss, 0 Draws
| Result | Rec. | Opponent | Method | Event | Date | Location |
| Win | 1–1 | (Russia) Rashid Vagabov | Decision (unanimous) | ACBJJ 20 | December 17, 2025 | Moscow, Russia |
| Loss | 0–1 | (Brazil) Jafel Filho | Decision (unanimous) | ADXC 8 | December 6, 2024 | Al Ain, UAE |

== See also ==
- List of current UFC fighters
- List of male mixed martial artists
