= Laura Sanko =

American sports commentator

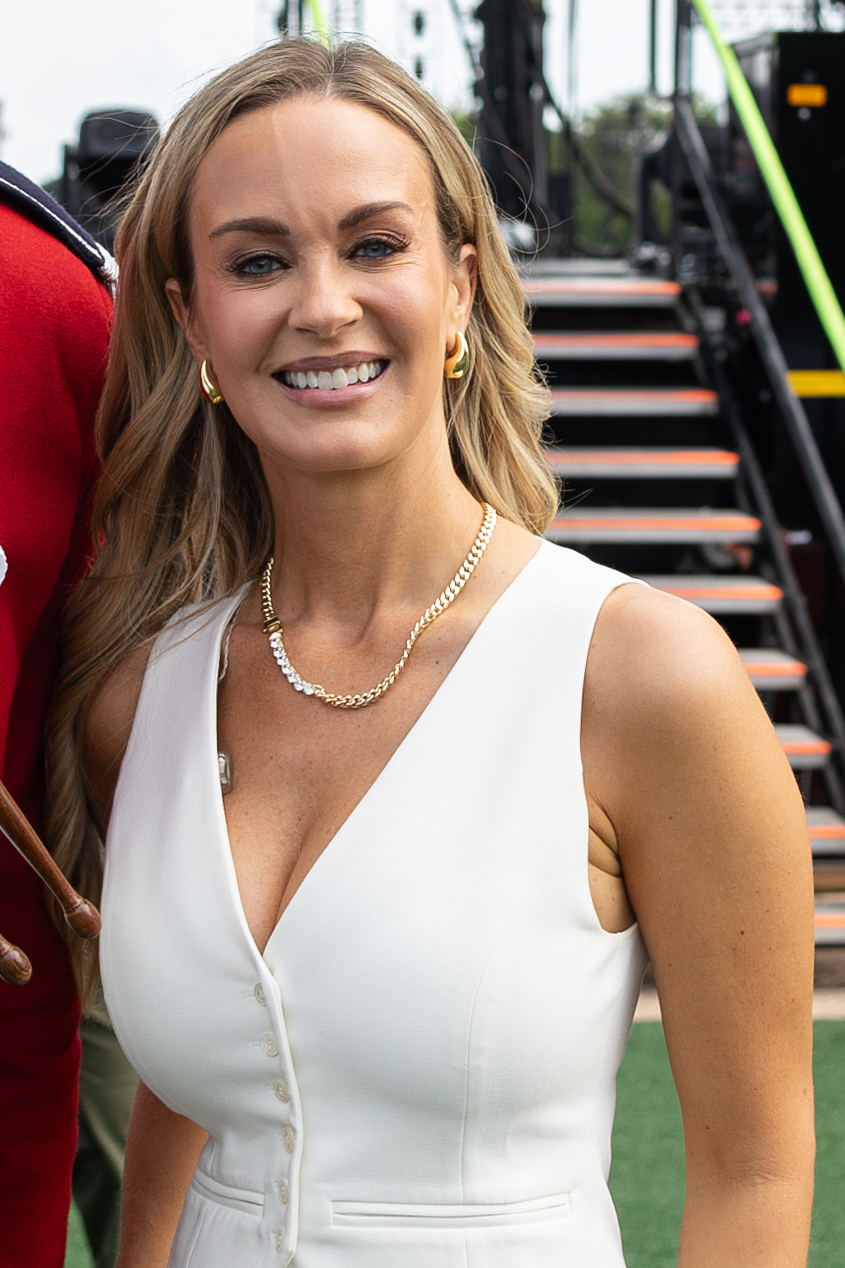
- Sanko in 2026
- Born: Laura Marcusse; December 7, 1982 (age 43); Chicago, Illinois, U.S.
- Other name: Fancy
- Education: William Jewell College
- Occupations: Color commentator Mixed martial artist

Laura Marcusse-Sanko (born December 7, 1982) is an American color commentator and sports analyst for the Ultimate Fighting Championship (UFC). Sanko is also a former mixed martial artist who competed in Invicta Fighting Championships, and a black belt in Brazilian jiu-jitsu.

== Background ==
Sanko adopted the nickname "Fancy" during her brief fighting career after an acquaintance told her she was too fancy to actually fight, rather than just train in mixed martial arts.

In 2021, Sanko became the first female commentator to work on a broadcast in the Zuffa or Endeavor era of the UFC when she provided color commentary for the Dana White's Contender Series season 5.

In January 2023, Sanko became the first female color commentator to appear on a UFC broadcast since Kathy Long at UFC 1 in 1993 when she joined the broadcast booth at UFC Fight Night: Lewis vs. Spivac. This made her the first female color commentator in the modern UFC era to call an event from the booth. On September 10, 2023, Sanko made her UFC pay-per-view commentary debut at UFC 293.

== Mixed martial arts record ==
Professional record breakdown
1 match	1 win	0 losses
By submission	1	0

Res.	Record	Opponent	Method	Event	Date	Round	Time	Location	Notes
Win	1–0	Cassie Robb	Submission (rear-naked choke)	Invicta FC 4: Esparza vs. Hyatt	January 5, 2013	2	1:07	Kansas City, Kansas, United States	Atomweight debut.
