= Rolando Dy =

Filipino mixed martial arts fighter

- Born: Rolando Gabriel Dy Jr. August 11, 1991 (age 35); Parañaque, Philippines
- Nickname: Dy Incredible
- Nationality: Filipino
- Height: 5 ft 8 in (1.73 m)
- Weight: 155 lb (70 kg; 11.1 st)
- Division: Lightweight (2020–present); Featherweight (2011–2019)
- Reach: 69 1/2 in (177 cm)
- Style: Boxing, Muay Thai, Brazilian Jiu-Jitsu, Kyokushin Karate
- Stance: Orthodox
- Fighting out of: Parañaque, Philippines
- Team: Dy Incredible team
- Years active: 2011–2022

Mixed martial arts record
- Total: 29
- Wins: 15
- By knockout: 4
- By submission: 2
- By decision: 9
- Losses: 13
- By knockout: 6
- By submission: 2
- By decision: 5
- No contests: 1

Bare-knuckle boxing record
- Total: 9
- Wins: 8
- By knockout: 7
- Losses: 1
- By knockout: 0

Other information
- Mixed martial arts record from Sherdog

Rolando Gabriel Dy (born August 11, 1990) is a Filipino bare-knuckle boxer and former mixed martial artist who competed in the Ultimate Fighting Championship (UFC) and Brave Combat Federation. He won championships in both mixed martial arts and bare-knuckle boxing, notably the Abu Dhabi Warriors featherweight title and the BKB World Super Welterweight Championship. He is the son of former WBC World super featherweight title holder Rolando Navarrete.

== Mixed martial arts career ==
=== Early career ===
Dy made his professional debut on a Nemesis MMA card in Quezon City, Philippines where he won by TKO in the 2nd round. He had 3 straight wins in Pacific Xtreme Combat (PXC) before signing with the UFC as a replacement fighter on two weeks notice.

=== Ultimate Fighting Championship ===
Dy's UFC debut was against TUF alum, Alex Caceres on June 17, 2017, in UFC Fight Night: Holm vs. Correia. Dy was dominated by the UFC veteran until the fight was stopped between the 2nd and 3rd rounds due to a cut on Dy's right eye. It was ruled as a TKO victory for Caceres.

On September 23, 2017, Dy faced Teruto Ishihara in UFC Fight Night: Saint Preux vs. Okami. He lost the fight via unanimous decision. The bout could've resulted to a majority draw if not for a point deduction from Dy for repeated groin strikes to Ishihara. The scores read 28–27, 28-27 and 29–27.

Dy confirmed that he was cut from the roster via email after 2 consecutive losses. However, he was offered a fight against UFC newcomer Wuliji Buren in UFC Fight Night: Bisping vs. Gastelum on November 25, 2017, as a late replacement. At the weigh-ins, Dy weighed in at 148 lbs., two pounds over the featherweight limit. As a result, he forfeited 20% of his purse to Buren and the bout was fought at a catchweight. Dy won the fight by unanimous decision.

Dy faced Shane Young on June 23, 2018, at UFC Fight Night 132. He lost the fight via technical knockout in the second round. This fight earned him his first Fight of the Night award. Later, he was subsequently released by the UFC.

=== Post-UFC ===
After being released by the UFC, Dy fought in two Middle East based promotions and captured the Abu Dhabi Warriors featherweight Championship on May 6, 2019.

Dy was scheduled to defend his UAE Warriors title against Austin Arnett at ADW 6 on October 18, 2019. However, Arnett withdrew from the bout due to an injury and was replaced by Do Gyeom Lee. Dy lost the bout via knockout.

=== Brave Combat Federation ===
After the title loss, Dy returned to Brave CF, facing Anzor Abdulkhozhaev at Brave CF 33 on December 27, 2019. He lost the bout via technical knockout in the first round.

Dy faced Maciek Gierszewski at Brave CF 42 on September 24, 2020. He won the fight via split decision.

Just over a month removed from his previous bout, Dy faced John Brewin at Brave CF 44 on November 5, 2020. Dy won the bout via unanimous decision.

Dy faced Abdisalam Kubanychbek at BRAVE CF 47 on March 11, 2021. He lost the fight via corner stoppage between the second and third round.

Dy faced Slobodan Maksimović on December 18, 2021, at Brave CF 56. He lost the bout via controversial unanimous decision.

Dy faced Ho Taek Oh on April 30, 2022, at Brave CF 58. He lost the bout in the first round after getting dropped and then submitted via rear-naked choke.

Dy faced Olzhas Eskaraev on September 30, 2022, at Brave CF 62. He lost the bout after getting knocked out in the second round and retired after the bout.

== Bare-knuckle boxing ==
=== Bare Knuckle Fighting Championship ===
On December 10, 2022, Dy made his bare-knuckle boxing debut in the main event of BKFC Asia 4: The Big Bash, defeating Apisit Sangmuang by first-round knockout.

=== BKB ===
Rolando Dy defeated George Hilyard by fourth-round knockout at BKB 34 on September 16, 2023.

Rolando Dy fought Martin Reffell for the BKB British Featherweight Championship at BKB 37 on March 30, 2024. He lost by unanimous decision.

Rolando DY defeated Hayden Sherriff by second-round TKO via corner stoppage at BYB 32 on October 12, 2024.

In a highly anticipated "legacy fight", Rolando Dy, son of former WBC Super Featherweight Champion Rolando Navarette, fought Roberto Duran Jr., son of 4-division champion and IBHOF inductee Roberto Duran, in the co-main event of BKB 41 on May 31, 2025. Dy defeated Duran Jr. via TKO at the end of the second round due to doctor stoppage and earned him the opportunity to challenge the incumbent champion Liam Rees for the BKB Super Welterweight Championship.

Rolando Dy made history at BKB 49 on December 5, 2025, by becoming the first bare knuckle boxing world champion from the Philippines where he defeated Liam Rees for the BKB World Super Welterweight Championship via unanimous decision. Dy made history, becoming the first bare knuckle boxing world champion from the Philippines. He, alongside his father, former WBC Super Featherweight Champion Rolando Navarrette, became the first father-son pair to hold world championships in boxing and bare knuckle.

== Championships and achievements ==
=== Mixed martial arts ===
- Ultimate Fighting Championship
  - Fight of the Night (One time) vs. Shane Young
- Abu Dhabi Warriors
  - ADW Featherweight Championship (One time)

=== Bare knuckle boxing ===
- BKB World Super Welterweight Championship (BKB 49)

== Mixed martial arts record ==
Professional record breakdown
29 matches	15 wins	13 losses
By knockout	4	6
By submission	2	2
By decision	9	5
No contests	1	

Res.	Record	Opponent	Method	Event	Date	Round	Time	Location	Notes
Win	15–13 (1)	Eduard Demenko	Decision (split)	Fire Cage FC 1	February 22, 2025	3	5:00	Nilai, Malaysia	Catchweight (161 lb) bout.
Loss	14–13 (1)	Olzhas Eskaraev	KO (punches)	Brave CF 62	September 30, 2022	2	3:40	Almaty, Kazakhstan	
Loss	14–12 (1)	Oh Ho-taek	Submission (rear-naked choke)	Brave CF 58	April 30, 2022	1	3:29	Incheon, South Korea	
Loss	14–11 (1)	Slobodan Maksimović	Decision (unanimous)	Brave CF 56	December 18, 2021	3	5:00	Belgrade, Serbia	
Loss	14–10 (1)	Abdisalam Kubanychbek	TKO (corner stoppage)	Brave CF 47	March 11, 2021	2	5:00	Arad, Bahrain	
Win	14–9 (1)	John Brewin	Decision (unanimous)	Brave CF 44	November 5, 2020	3	5:00	Riffa, Bahrain	
Win	13–9 (1)	Maciek Gierszewski	Decision (split)	Brave CF 42	September 24, 2020	3	5:00	Riffa, Bahrain	Lightweight debut.
Loss	12–9 (1)	Anzor Abdulkhozhaev	KO (punches)	Brave CF 33	December 27, 2019	1	1:15	Jeddah, Saudi Arabia	
Loss	12–8 (1)	Lee Do-gyeom	KO (punches)	UAE Warriors 8	October 18, 2019	1	3:05	Abu Dhabi, United Arab Emirates	Lost the UAE Warriors Featherweight Championship.
Win	12–7 (1)	Erzhan Estanov	Decision (unanimous)	UAE Warriors 6	May 4, 2019	5	5:00	Abu Dhabi, United Arab Emirates	Won the inaugural UAE Warriors Featherweight Championship.
Win	11–7 (1)	Mehmosh Raza	TKO (punches)	Brave CF 22	March 15, 2019	1	4:04	Pasay, Philippines	
Win	10–7 (1)	Izzeddine Al Derbani	TKO (punches)	UAE Warriors 5	January 26, 2019	1	N/A	Abu Dhabi, United Arab Emirates	
Loss	9–7 (1)	Shane Young	TKO (punches)	UFC Fight Night: Cowboy vs. Edwards	June 23, 2018	2	4:40	Kallang, Singapore	Fight of the Night.
Win	9–6 (1)	Wuliji Buren	Decision (unanimous)	UFC Fight Night: Bisping vs. Gastelum	November 25, 2017	3	5:00	Shanghai, China	Catchweight (148 lb) bout; Dy missed weight.
Loss	8–6 (1)	Teruto Ishihara	Decision (unanimous)	UFC Fight Night: Saint Preux vs. Okami	September 22, 2017	3	5:00	Saitama, Japan	Dy was deducted one point in round 3 due to repeated groin strikes.
Loss	8–5 (1)	Alex Caceres	TKO (eye injury)	UFC Fight Night: Holm vs. Correia	June 17, 2017	2	5:00	Kallang, Singapore	
NC	8–4 (1)	Nelson Paes	NC (accidental clash of heads)	Brave CF 5	April 22, 2017	1	0:28	Mumbai, India	Accidental clash of heads rendered Paes unable to continue.
Win	8–4	Aydin Mrouki	Decision (unanimous)	Pacific Xtreme Combat 55	November 18, 2016	3	5:00	Parañaque, Philippines	
Win	7–4	Koyomi Matsushima	KO (punch)	Pacific Xtreme Combat 53	April 8, 2016	1	0:23	Parañaque, Philippines	
Win	6–4	Miguel Mosquera	Decision (unanimous)	Pacific Xtreme Combat 51	January 16, 2016	3	5:00	Parañaque, Philippines	
Loss	5–4	Kyle Aguon	Decision (split)	Pacific Xtreme Combat 48	June 13, 2015	3	5:00	Pasig, Philippines	Return to Featherweight.
Loss	5–3	Kyle Aguon	Decision (split)	Pacific Xtreme Combat 45	October 24, 2014	5	5:00	Mangilao, Guam	For the PXC Bantamweight Championship.
Win	5–2	Park Han-bin	Decision (unanimous)	Pacific Xtreme Combat 43	March 29, 2014	3	5:00	Pasig, Philippines	Bantamweight debut.
Win	4–2	Kyle Reyes	Decision (unanimous)	Pacific Xtreme Combat 39	September 14, 2013	3	5:00	Pasig, Philippines	
Win	3–2	Arex Montalban	Submission (armbar)	Pacific Xtreme Combat 37	May 18, 2013	1	4:50	Pasig, Philippines	
Loss	2–2	Ev Ting	Decision (unanimous)	Legend FC 10	August 24, 2012	3	5:00	Hong Kong, SAR, China	
Win	2–1	Alde Alonzo de Zosa	TKO (punches)	Pacific Xtreme Combat 31	July 14, 2012	2	N/A	Pasig, Philippines	
Loss	1–1	Elliot Untalan	Submission (rear-naked choke)	Pacific Xtreme Combat 28	November 26, 2011	1	N/A	Pasig, Philippines	
Win	1–0	Ryan Taclan	TKO (punches)	Nemesis MMA Wars: New Blood	October 15, 2011	2	N/A	Quezon City, Philippines	Featherweight debut.

== Bare knuckle boxing record ==
Professional record breakdown
8 matches	7 wins	1 loss
By knockout	6	0
By decision	1	1

Res.	Record	Opponent	Method	Event	Date	Round	Time	Location	Notes
Win	7–1	Scott McHugh	TKO (corner stoppage)	BKB 60: Newcastle	Oct 10, 2026	3	2:15	Ultilitia Arena, Newcastle, England	Defended the BKB World Super Welterweight Championship.
Win	6–1	Paulie Malignaggi	KO (punch)	BKB 54: Mayhem in Manchester	May 16, 2026	2	0:56	Manchester, England	Defended the BKB World Super Welterweight Championship.
Win	5–1	Liam Rees	Decision (unanimous)	BKB 49: Dance of the Dragons	December 5, 2025	7	3:00	Wales, United Kingdom	Won the BKB World Super Welterweight Championship.
Win	4–1	Roberto Duran Jr	TKO (doctor stoppage)	BKB 41: Brawl in Duval II	May 31, 2025	2	3:00	Florida, United States of America	
Win	3–1	Hayden Sherriff	TKO (corner stoppage)	BYB 32: Leeds Brawl	October 12, 2024	2	1:07	Leeds, United Kingdom	
Loss	2–1	Martin Reffell	Decision (unanimous)	BKB 37: Sweeney vs. Connelly	March 30, 2024	5	2:00	Wolverhampton, United Kingdom	For the BKB British Featherweight Championship.
Win	2–0	George Hillyard	TKO (referee stoppage)	BKB 34: McCallum vs. Tiffin	September 16, 2023	4	0:57	London, United Kingdom	BKB debut.
Win	1–0	Apisit Sangmuang	KO (punches)	BKFC Asia 4: The Big Bash	December 10, 2022	1	0:42	Bangkok, Thailand	Bare knuckle boxing debut.

== See also ==
- List of male mixed martial artists
