= Koyomi Matsushima =

Japanese mixed martial arts fighter

Koyomi Matsushima 松嶋こよみ
- Born: October 8, 1992 (age 34); Yokohama, Japan
- Other names: Moushigo
- Height: 5 ft 7 in (1.70 m)
- Weight: 145 lb (66 kg; 10 st 5 lb)
- Reach: 66 in (168 cm)
- Style: Karate, Judo
- Fighting out of: Yokohama, Japan
- Team: Abe Ani Combat Club
- Rank: Black belt in Kyokushin karate
- Years active: 2015–present

Mixed martial arts record
- Total: 24
- Wins: 15
- By knockout: 9
- By submission: 1
- By decision: 5
- Losses: 9
- By knockout: 5
- By submission: 1
- By decision: 2
- By disqualification: 1

Other information
- Mixed martial arts record from Sherdog

Koyomi Matsushima (Japanese: 松嶋こよみ; born October 8, 1992) is a Japanese mixed martial artist who competes in the Featherweight division and has previously fought in ONE Championship and Pancrase. Matsushima has faced strong opposition with the likes of Dave Leduc, Marat Gafurov, and Garry Tonon.

== Background ==
Koyomi Matsushima is currently training under Japanese MMA Legend Satoru Kitaoka and has been a combat sports fan all his life, growing up watching karate, judo, wrestling, and mixed martial arts bouts in his native Japan. His own training began first with Kyokushin karate, which he started in order to find his center and build the foundations of his own competitive career.

== Mixed martial arts career ==
=== Early career ===
On May 2, 2015, early in his mixed martial arts career, Matsushima faced future Lethwei world champion Dave Leduc at Hybrid Pro Series 3 in Gatineau, Canada, and won by first-round TKO in 19 seconds.

=== ONE Championship ===
After a successful career in the Japanese MMA circuit, including runs with both Shooto and Pancrase, Matsushima signed with ONE Championship in 2018. He was scheduled to make his promotional debut against former ONE Featherweight Champion Marat Gafurov at ONE Championship: Conquest of Heroes on September 22, 2018. Matsushima won by first-round technical knockout.

Matsushima was scheduled to face Kwon Won Il at ONE Championship: Legendary Quest on June 15, 2019. He won by unanimous decision.

After two straight wins, Matsushima challenged Martin Nguyen for the ONE Featherweight World Championship at ONE Championship: Dawn of Heroes on August 2, 2019. Matsushima lost by second-round technical knockout.

He was scheduled to face Kim Jae Woong at ONE Championship: Warrior's Code on February 7, 2020. Matsushima won by third-round technical knockout.

Matsushima was scheduled to face former ADCC and IBJJF champion Garry Tonon in a featherweight title eliminator at ONE Championship: Big Bang on December 4, 2020. Matsushima was unable to stick to his winning ways, getting dominated on the ground en route to a unanimous decision loss.

=== Road to UFC ===
Matsushima faced Jun Young Hong in the quarterfinals of the Featherweight tournament on June 9, 2022 in Road to UFC Season 1: Episode 2. He won the bout via split decision.

Matsushima faced Yi Zha in the Semi-Finals of the Featherweight tournament on October 23, 2022 at Road to UFC Season 1: Episode 5. He lost the close bout via split decision.

=== Post-Road to UFC ===
In his first bout since the loss on Road To UFC, Matsushima faced Ryuji Takashio at DEEP 114 Impact on July 2, 2023, knocking him out with a soccer kick in the first round.

Matsushima faced Karshyga Dautbek on January 21, 2024 at Top Brights 1, losing the bout via TKO stoppage at the end of the first round.

== Titles ==
- Shooto
  - 2015 Shooto Rookie Tournament Champion

== Mixed martial arts record ==
Professional record breakdown
24 matches	15 wins	9 losses
By knockout	9	5
By submission	1	1
By decision	5	2
By disqualification	0	1

Res.	Record	Opponent	Method	Event	Date	Round	Time	Location	Notes
Loss	15–9	Viktor Kolesnik	TKO (elbows and soccer kick)	Rizin Landmark 16	October 3, 2026	2	0:20	Nagasaki, Japan	
Loss	15–8	Ryan Cafaro	Submission (inverted guillotine choke)	Rizin 53	May 10, 2026	3	2:23	Kobe, Japan	
Win	15–7	Sodnomdorj Purevdorj	TKO (flying knee to the body)	Gladiator Challenger Series 02	July 12, 2024	2	2:45	Tokyo, Japan	Gladiator Featherweight Tournament Quarterfinal.
Loss	14–7	Karshyga Dautbek	TKO (elbow and punches)	TOP BRIGHTS 01	January 21, 2024	1	4:41	Ōta, Japan	
Win	14–6	Ryuji Takashio	KO (punch and soccer kick)	DEEP 114 Impact	July 2, 2023	1	1:54	Tokyo, Japan	
Loss	13–6	Yi Zha	Decision (split)	Road to UFC Season 1: Episode 5	October 23, 2022	3	5:00	Abu Dhabi, United Arab Emirates	Road to UFC Season 1 Featherweight Tournament Semifinal.
Win	13–5	Jun Young-hong	Decision (split)	Road to UFC Season 1: Episode 2	June 9, 2022	3	5:00	Kallang, Singapore	Return to Featherweight. Road to UFC Season 1 Featherweight Tournament Quarterfinal.
Loss	12–5	Garry Tonon	Decision (unanimous)	ONE: Big Bang	December 4, 2020	3	5:00	Kallang, Singapore	
Win	12–4	Kim Jae-woong	TKO (punches)	ONE: Warrior's Code	February 7, 2020	3	0:24	Jakarta, Indonesia	
Loss	11–4	Martin Nguyen	TKO (punches)	ONE: Dawn of Heroes	August 2, 2019	2	4:40	Pasay, Philippines	For the ONE Featherweight Championship (155 lb).
Win	11–3	Kwon Won-il	Decision (unanimous)	ONE: Legendary Quest	June 15, 2019	3	5:00	Shanghai, China	
Win	10–3	Marat Gafurov	TKO (punches)	ONE: Conquest of Heroes	September 22, 2018	1	1:41	Jakarta, Indonesia	Return to Lightweight.
Loss	9–3	Isao Kobayashi	DQ (illegal knee)	Pancrase 295	April 15, 2018	1	4:34	Tokyo, Japan	For the Interim Pancrase Featherweight Championship.
Win	9–2	Kyle Aguon	Decision (unanimous)	Pancrase 292	December 10, 2017	3	5:00	Tokyo, Japan	
Win	8–2	Yusuke Kasuya	Decision (unanimous)	Pancrase 289	August 20, 2017	3	5:00	Tokyo, Japan	
Win	7–2	Yojiro Uchimura	Decision (unanimous)	Pancrase 286	April 23, 2017	3	5:00	Tokyo, Japan	
Loss	6–2	Marlon Sandro	TKO (elbows and punches)	Pancrase 283	December 18, 2016	1	2:51	Tokyo, Japan	
Win	6–1	Juntaro Ushiku	Technical Submission (kimura)	Pancrase 280	September 11, 2016	3	3:11	Tokyo, Japan	
Loss	5–1	Rolando Dy	KO (punch)	Pacific Xtreme Combat 53	April 8, 2016	1	0:23	Parañaque, Philippines	Featherweight debut.
Win	5–0	Daisuke Arakawa	KO (punch)	Shooto: Infinity League 2015 Finals	December 20, 2015	1	0:16	Tokyo, Japan	Won the 2015 Shooto Rookie Lightweight Tournament.
Win	4–0	Yushikazu Fujishi	KO (head kick)	Shooto: Grapplingman 16	September 21, 2015	2	0:43	Tokyo, Japan	
Win	3–0	Eric Gatmen	KO (slam)	Pacific Xtreme Combat 49	August 7, 2015	1	3:06	Mangilao, Guam	
Win	2–0	Dave Leduc	TKO (punches)	Hybrid Pro Series 3	May 2, 2015	1	0:19	Gatineau, Quebec, Canada	Catchweight (160 lb) bout.
Win	1–0	Yoshinori Takahashi	KO (punches)	Shooto: Gig Tokyo 18	February 11, 2015	1	0:10	Tokyo, Japan	Lightweight debut.
