= UFC 294 =

Mixed martial arts event in 2023

UFC 294: Makhachev vs. Volkanovski 2
- The poster for UFC 294: Makhachev vs. Volkanovski 2
- Promotion: Ultimate Fighting Championship
- Date: October 21, 2023
- Venue: Etihad Arena
- City: Abu Dhabi, United Arab Emirates
- Attendance: Not announced

Event chronology
UFC Fight Night: Yusuff vs. Barboza	UFC 294: Makhachev vs. Volkanovski 2	UFC Fight Night: Almeida vs. Lewis

UFC 294: Makhachev vs. Volkanovski 2 was a mixed martial arts event produced by the Ultimate Fighting Championship that took place on October 21, 2023, at the Etihad Arena in Abu Dhabi, United Arab Emirates.

== Background ==
The event marked the promotion's 18th visit to Abu Dhabi and first since UFC 280 in October 2022.

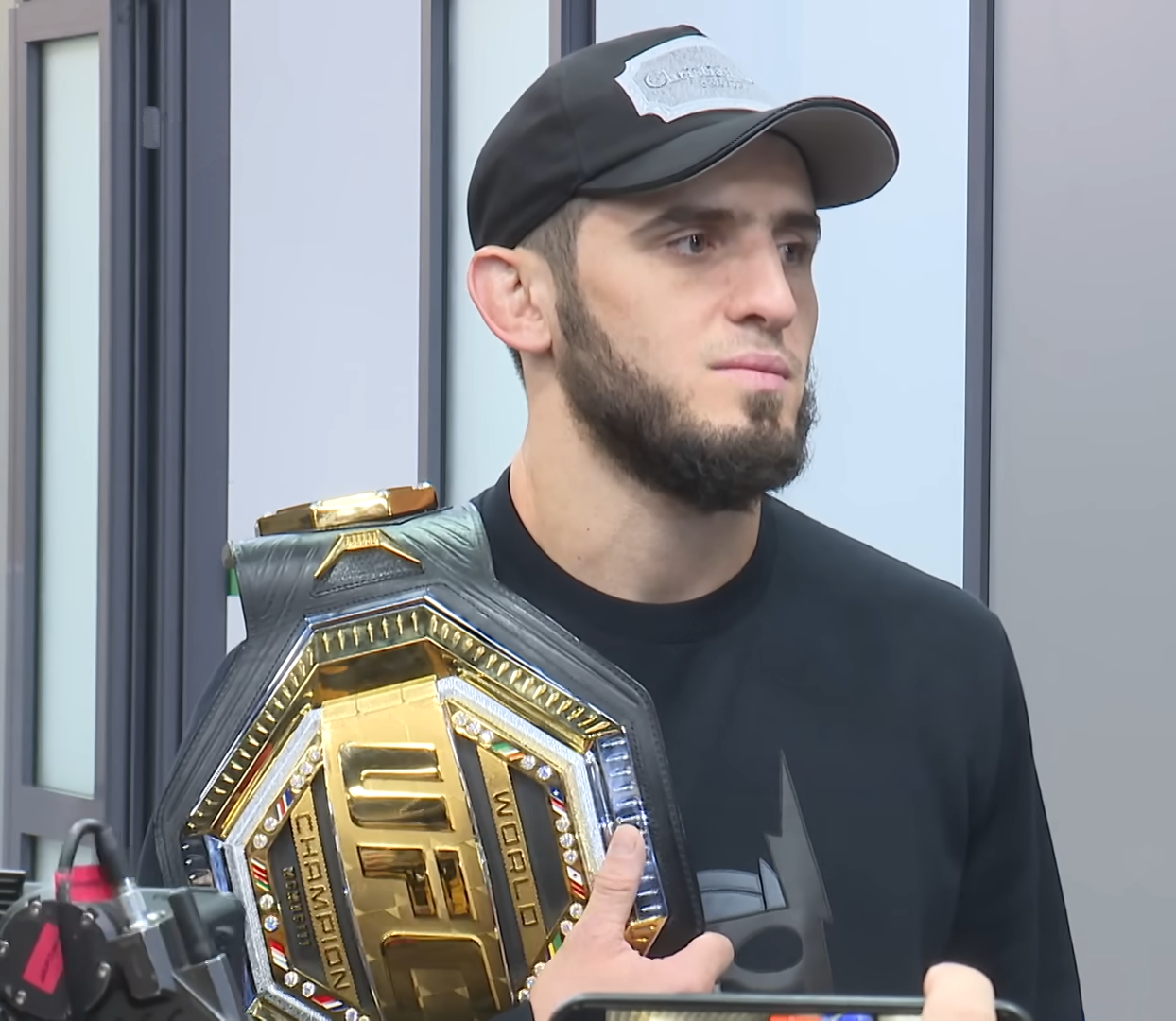
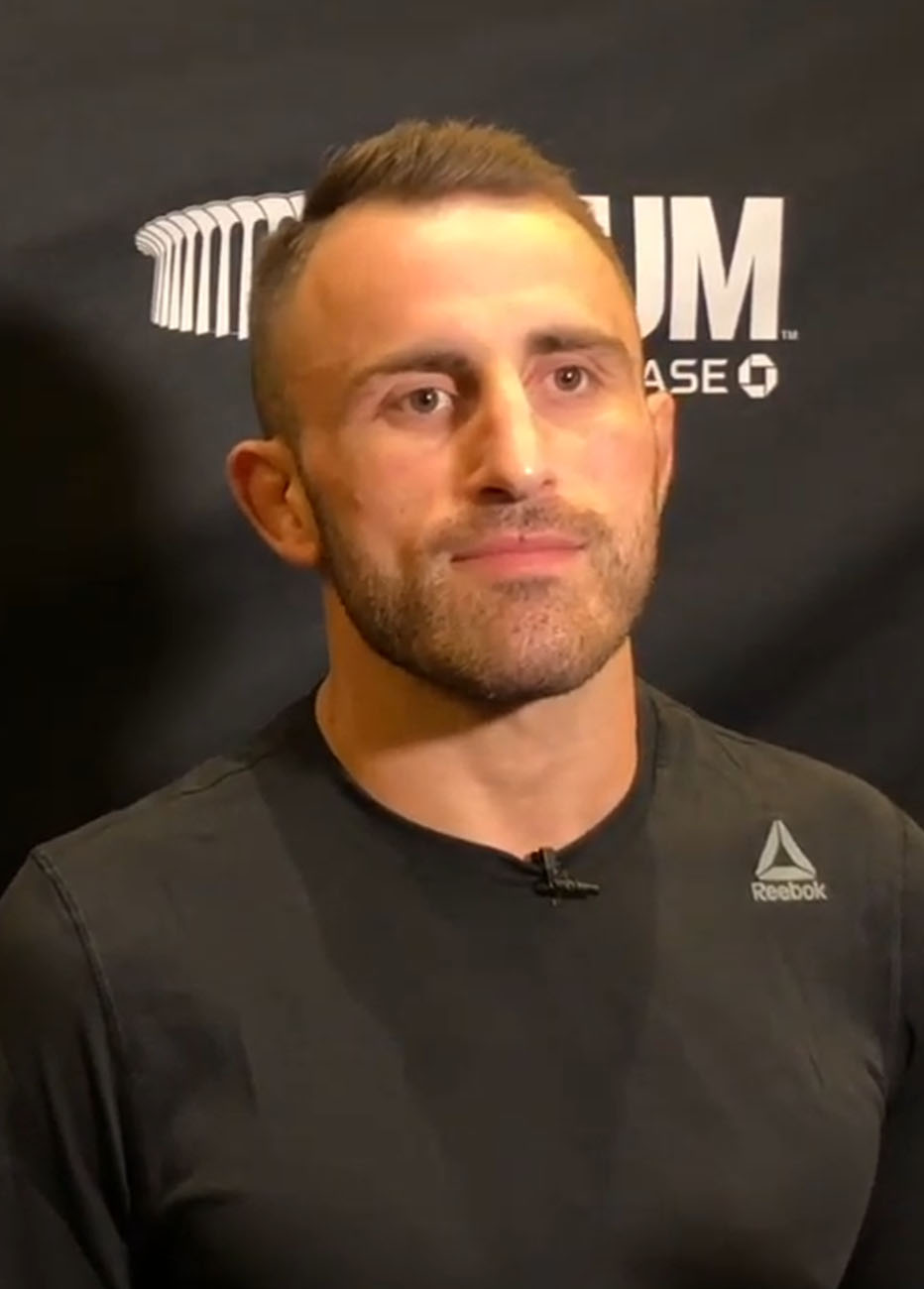
Makhachev (left) made his second title defense. In the rematch, Volkanovski (right) aspired to become the second man to be a simultaneous UFC featherweight and lightweight champion.

A UFC Lightweight Championship rematch between current champion Islam Makhachev and former champion Charles Oliveira was expected to headline the event. The pair previously met at UFC 280 one year prior, where Makhachev captured the vacant title by second round submission. However, Oliveira withdrew due to injury and was replaced by UFC Featherweight Champion Alexander Volkanovski. This marked the first time that champions in different divisions rematch for the same title and the ninth time overall that champions in different divisions fought for the same title, following UFC 94, UFC 205, UFC 226, UFC 232, UFC Fight Night: Cejudo vs. Dillashaw, UFC 259, UFC 277 and UFC 284, the latter event in which Makhachev defeated Volkanovski by unanimous decision. If successful, Volkanovski would have become the fifth person to be champion in two divisions simultaneously (after Conor McGregor at UFC 205, Daniel Cormier at UFC 226, Amanda Nunes at UFC 232 and UFC 277, and Henry Cejudo at UFC 238), as well as the eighth person overall to win a title in different divisions. Former KSW Featherweight and Lightweight Champion Mateusz Gamrot served as backup and potential replacement for this fight.

A middleweight bout between Ikram Aliskerov and Nassourdine Imavov was expected to take place at the event. However, Imavov withdrew due to visa issues and was replaced by The Ultimate Fighter: Brazil 3 middleweight winner Warlley Alves.

A middleweight bout between former UFC Middleweight Championship challenger Paulo Costa and Khamzat Chimaev was expected to take place at the event. However, Costa withdrew after he underwent surgery on his elbow and was replaced by former UFC Welterweight Champion Kamaru Usman.

At the weigh-ins, Victoria Dudakova weighed in at 116.6 pounds, 0.6 pounds over the strawweight non-title fight limit. Mike Breeden weighed in at 159.5 pounds, three and a half pounds over the lightweight non-title fight limit. Both of their bouts proceeded at catchweight with Dudakova being fined 20% of her purse and Breeden 30%, which went to their opponents former Invicta FC Atomweight Champion Jinh Yu Frey and Road to UFC Season 1 lightweight tournament winner Anshul Jubli, respectively.

== Results ==
Main card
Weight class				Method	Round	Time	Notes
Lightweight	Islam Makhachev (c)	def.	Alexander Volkanovski	KO (head kick and punches)	1	3:06	(Note: For the UFC Lightweight Championship.)
Middleweight	Khamzat Chimaev	def.	Kamaru Usman	Decision (majority) (29–27, 29–27, 28–28)	3	5:00
Light Heavyweight	Magomed Ankalaev	vs.	Johnny Walker	No Contest (illegal knee)	1	3:13	(Note: An accidental illegal knee rendered Walker unable to continue.)
Middleweight	Ikram Aliskerov	def.	Warlley Alves	TKO (flying knee and punches)	1	2:07
Bantamweight	Said Nurmagomedov	def.	Muin Gafurov	Submission (guillotine choke)	1	1:13
Preliminary card (ESPN+)
Flyweight	Muhammad Mokaev	def.	Tim Elliott	Submission (arm-triangle choke)	3	3:03
Lightweight	Trevor Peek	def.	Mohammad Yahya	Decision (unanimous) (29–28, 30–27, 30–27)	3	5:00
Bantamweight	Javid Basharat	vs.	Victor Henry	No Contest (accidental groin kick)	2	0:15	(Note: An accidental groin kick rendered Henry unable to continue.)
Middleweight	Sedriques Dumas	def.	Abu Azaitar	Decision (unanimous) (29–28, 29–28, 29–28)	3	5:00
Catchweight (159.5 lb)	Mike Breeden	def.	Anshul Jubli	KO (punches)	3	3:00
Featherweight	Muhammad Naimov	def.	Nathaniel Wood	Decision (unanimous) (29–28, 29–28, 29–28)	3	5:00
Catchweight (116.6 lb)	Victoria Dudakova	def.	Jinh Yu Frey	Decision (unanimous) (29–28, 29–28, 29–28)	3	5:00
Middleweight	Sharabutdin Magomedov	def.	Bruno Silva	Decision (unanimous) (30–27, 30–27, 30–27)	3	5:00

== Bonus awards ==
The following fighters received $50,000 bonuses.

- Fight of the Night: No bonus awarded.
- Performance of the Night: Islam Makhachev, Ikram Aliskerov, Said Nurmagomedov, and Muhammad Mokaev

== See also ==
- List of UFC events
- List of current UFC fighters
- 2023 in UFC
