= UFC Fight Night: Bisping vs. Gastelum =

UFC mixed martial arts event in 2017

- The poster for UFC Fight Night: Bisping vs. Gastelum
- Promotion: Ultimate Fighting Championship
- Date: November 25, 2017
- Venue: Mercedes Benz Arena
- City: Shanghai, China
- Attendance: 15,128

Event chronology
UFC Fight Night: Werdum vs. Tybura	UFC Fight Night: Bisping vs. Gastelum	The Ultimate Fighter: A New World Champion Finale

UFC Fight Night: Bisping vs. Gastelum (also known as UFC Fight Night 122) was a mixed martial arts event produced by the Ultimate Fighting Championship and held on November 25, 2017, at Mercedes Benz Arena in Shanghai, China.

== Background ==
After previously contesting three events in Macau (a Special administrative region of China) since 2012, the event marked the first that the promotion held on Mainland China.

A middleweight bout between former UFC Middleweight Champion Anderson Silva and The Ultimate Fighter: Team Jones vs. Team Sonnen middleweight winner Kelvin Gastelum was expected to serve as the main event. The pairing was previously scheduled to meet in June 2017 at UFC 212. However, Gastelum was pulled from the bout after he tested positive for Carboxy-Tetrahydrocannabinol (Carboxy-THC) which is a metabolite of marijuana or hashish above the 180 ng/mL allowance by the World Anti-Doping Agency (WADA) standard. In turn, despite having two months to secure an opponent, Silva and promotion officials confirmed on May 11 that he would not compete at that event.

On November 10, it was announced that Silva had failed an out of competition drug test stemming from a sample collected on October 26 and as a result had been pulled from the card. A day later, former UFC Middleweight Champion and The Ultimate Fighter 3 light heavyweight winner Michael Bisping was secured as a replacement opponent for Gastelum. Bisping had fought 21 days prior to this event at UFC 217, where he lost the championship to former two-time UFC Welterweight Champion Georges St-Pierre.

On November 18, it was announced that James Mulheron had failed an out-of-competition drug test stemming from sampled collected on November 10 and as a result he was pulled from the card. His scheduled opponent, Cyril Asker, remained on the card and faced promotional newcomer Hu Yaozong.

A pair of promotional newcomers, Liu Pingyuan and Bharat Khandare were expected to face each other at the event. However, Liu pulled out in November and was replaced by fellow newcomer Song Yadong.

At the weigh ins, Rolando Dy weighed in at 148 pounds, 2 pounds over the featherweight upper limit of 146 pounds. As such, the bout was held at a catchweight and Dy forfeited 20% of his purse to Wuliji Buren.

== Results ==
Main Card (UFC Fight Pass)
Weight class				Method	Round	Time	Notes
Middleweight	Kelvin Gastelum	def.	Michael Bisping	KO (punch)	1	2:30
Welterweight	Li Jingliang	def.	Zak Ottow	TKO (punches)	1	2:57
Featherweight	Wang Guan	def.	Alex Caceres	Decision (split) (28–29, 29–28, 29–28)	3	5:00
Welterweight	Alex Garcia	def.	Muslim Salikhov	Submission (rear-naked choke)	2	3:22
Preliminary Card (UFC Fight Pass)
Featherweight	Zabit Magomedsharipov	def.	Sheymon Moraes	Submission (anaconda choke)	3	4:30
Welterweight	Song Kenan	def.	Bobby Nash	TKO (punches)	1	0:15
Women's Strawweight	Yan Xiaonan	def.	Kailin Curran	Decision (unanimous) (29–28, 29–28, 30–27)	3	5:00
Featherweight	Song Yadong	def.	Bharat Kandare	Submission (guillotine choke)	1	4:16
Heavyweight	Shamil Abdurakhimov	def.	Chase Sherman	KO (punch)	1	1:24
Women's Bantamweight	Gina Mazany	def.	Wu Yanan	Decision (unanimous) (30–27, 30–27, 30–27)	3	5:00
Catchweight (148 lb)	Rolando Dy	def.	Wuliji Buren	Decision (unanimous) (30–27, 29–28, 30–27)	3	5:00
Heavyweight	Cyril Asker	def.	Hu Yaozong	Submission (rear-naked choke)	2	2:33

== Bonus awards ==
The following fighters were awarded $50,000 bonuses:

- Fight of the Night: None awarded
- Performance of the Night: Kelvin Gastelum, Li Jingliang, Zabit Magomedsharipov, Song Kenan and Song Yadong.

== Aftermath ==
On January 30, 2018, it was announced that Mulheron accepted a one-year suspension due to his failed test. He originally tested positive for clomiphene and hydroxyclomiphene.

On February 1, a report came out revealing that Silva tested positive for methyltestosterone and an unspecified diuretic. On July 18, Silva was suspended for one-year, retroactive to November 10, 2017, after USADA traced his second positive drug test to a compounding pharmacy known for producing tainted supplements.

== See also ==
- List of UFC events
- 2017 in UFC
