= Jeka Saragih =

Indonesian mixed martial artist (born 1995)

- Born: 1 January 1995 (age 31); Raya, Simalungun, North Sumatra, Indonesia
- Other names: Si Tendangan Maut (The Lethal Kicker)
- Height: 5 ft 8 in (1.73 m)
- Weight: 146 lb (66 kg; 10 st 6 lb)
- Division: Featherweight (2023–present); Lightweight (2016–2023)
- Reach: 69 in (175 cm)
- Style: Wushu
- Fighting out of: Simalungun, Indonesia
- Team: Studio 540; MMA Fight Academy (2023–present)
- Years active: 2016–present

Mixed martial arts record
- Total: 19
- Wins: 14
- By knockout: 9
- By submission: 4
- By decision: 1
- Losses: 5
- By knockout: 2
- By submission: 3

Other information
- Mixed martial arts record from Sherdog

Jeka Saragih (born 1 January 1995) is an Indonesian mixed martial artist who competes in the Featherweight division. He previously fought in the Ultimate Fighting Championship (UFC), being the first Indonesian to sign with the promotion.

== Background ==
Jeka was born in Bah Pasunsang, Raya, Simalungun, North Sumatra. He is an ethnic Batak Simalungun. Jeka began his martial arts career by starting Wushu in 2013 and won the national championship in Yogyakarta and had the opportunity to represent North Sumatra in the title of National Sports Week.

== Mixed martial arts career ==
=== Early career ===
Despite his busy schedule at work, Jeka continued to hone his martial arts skills, until finally becoming an apprentice at Yakop Sutjipto's Batam Fighter Club (BFC) gym. Jeka received an offer from the owner of BFC to take part in the One Pride Championship, starting his career in the lightweight division.

In April 2017, Jeka won the One Pride Lightweight championship, after successfully defeating the reigning champion, Ngapdi Mulidy, by TKO in the first round. He would go on to defend his title 4 times, before eventually losing it in February 2020, when he was submitted in the 4th round by Angga Hans via rear naked choke. He would rebound with two straight victories, before winning the Interim Lightweight Championship against Hatoropan Simbolon via second-round TKO stoppage.

=== Road to UFC ===
Saragih faced Pawan Maan Singh in the Quarter-Finals of the Lightweight tournament on June 9, 2022, in Road to UFC Season 1: Episode 2. He won the bout in the third round, knocking out Singh with a spinning back fist.

Saragih faced Ki Won Bin in the Semi-Finals of the Lightweight tournament on October 23, 2022, at Road to UFC Season 1: Episode 5. He won the bout in the first round, knocking out Bin.

In the finals of the tournament, Saragih faced Anshul Jubli on February 4, 2023, at UFC Fight Night: Lewis vs. Spivac. He lost the fight via technical knockout in the second round.

=== Ultimate Fighting Championship ===
Saragih was scheduled to face Jesse Butler on November 18, 2023, at UFC Fight Night 232. However, Butler withdrew due to injury and was replaced by Charlie Campbell. With Campbell also out of the fight, Saragih was next booked against Lucas Alexander. At the weigh-ins, Alexander weighed in at 148 pounds, two pounds over the featherweight non-title fight limit. The bout proceeded at catchweight with Alexander being fined 20% of his purse which went to Saragih. Saragih won the fight by knockout in the first round. This fight earned him the Performance of the Night award.

Saragih faced Westin Wilson on June 15, 2024, at UFC on ESPN 58. He lost the fight by an armbar submission in the first round.

Saragih faced promotional newcomer Yoo Joo-sang on June 7, 2025, at UFC 316. He lost the fight by knockout 28 seconds into the first round.

On July 14, 2025, it was announced that Saragih was no longer on the UFC roster.

== Personal life ==
In 2017, Jeka Saragih won the championship for the One Pride MMA competition for the 70 kg class in 2017. In 2018, he was also asked to carry the Asian Games torch around North Sumatra.

Saragih has a daughter (born 2024).

== Championships and accomplishments ==
=== Mixed martial arts ===
- Ultimate Fighting Championship
  - Performance of the Night (One time) vs. Lucas Alexander
  - UFC.com Awards
    - 2023: Ranked #9 Newcomer of the Year
- One Pride MMA
  - OPMMA Lightweight Championship (One time)
    - Four successful title defenses
  - Interim OPMMA Lightweight Championship (One time)

== Mixed martial arts record ==
Professional record breakdown
19 matches	14 wins	5 losses
By knockout	9	2
By submission	4	3
By decision	1	0

Res.	Record	Opponent	Method	Event	Date	Round	Time	Location	Notes
Loss	14–5	Yoo Joo-sang	KO (punch)	UFC 316	June 7, 2025	1	0:28	Newark, New Jersey, United States	
Loss	14–4	Westin Wilson	Submission (triangle armbar)	UFC on ESPN: Perez vs. Taira	June 15, 2024	1	1:49	Las Vegas, Nevada, United States	
Win	14–3	Lucas Alexander	KO (punches)	UFC Fight Night: Allen vs. Craig	November 18, 2023	1	1:31	Las Vegas, Nevada, United States	Featherweight debut; Alexander missed weight (148 lb). Performance of the Night.
Loss	13–3	Anshul Jubli	TKO (punches and elbows)	UFC Fight Night: Lewis vs. Spivac	February 4, 2023	2	3:44	Las Vegas, Nevada, United States	Road to UFC Season 1 Lightweight Tournament final.
Win	13–2	Ki Won-bin	KO (punch)	Road to UFC Season 1: Episode 5	October 23, 2022	1	2:41	Abu Dhabi, United Arab Emirates	Road to UFC Season 1 Lightweight Tournament semifinal.
Win	12–2	Pawan Maan Singh	KO (spinning backfist)	Road to UFC Season 1: Episode 2	June 9, 2022	3	2:24	Kallang, Singapore	Road to UFC Season 1 Lightweight Tournament quarterfinal.
Win	11–2	Hatoropan Simbolon	TKO (punch)	One Pride MMA Fight Night 58	May 21, 2022	2	1:04	Jakarta, Indonesia	Won the interim OPMMA Lightweight Championship.
Win	10–2	Rama Sabturi	Decision (unanimous)	One Pride MMA Fight Night 56	February 12, 2022	3	5:00	Jakarta, Indonesia	
Win	9–2	Agung Maulana	TKO (punches and elbows)	One Pride MMA Fight Night 40	December 19, 2020	1	2:55	Jakarta, Indonesia	
Loss	8–2	Angga Hans	Submission (rear-naked choke)	One Pride MMA Fight Night 36	February 15, 2020	4	4:23	Jakarta, Indonesia	Lost the OPMMA Lightweight Championship.
Win	8–1	Mhar John Manahan	Submission (rear-naked choke)	One Pride MMA Fight Night 32	September 21, 2019	1	3:12	Jakarta, Indonesia	
Win	7–1	Hendrik Tarigan	Submission (rear-naked choke)	One Pride MMA Fight Night 30	July 27, 2019	1	1:11	Senayan, Indonesia	Defended the OPMMA Lightweight Championship.
Win	6–1	Hatoropan Simbolon	TKO (submission to elbows)	One Pride MMA Fight Night 25	December 1, 2018	2	4:17	Kelapa Gading, Indonesia	Defended the OPMMA Lightweight Championship.
Win	5–1	Mohammad Fuad	TKO (leg kicks)	One Pride MMA Fight Night 19	May 5, 2018	1	4:01	Kelapa Gading, Indonesia	Defended the OPMMA Lightweight Championship.
Win	4–1	Kevin Sulistio	Submission (rear-naked choke)	One Pride MMA Fight Night 13	October 7, 2017	3	3:07	Kelapa Gading, Indonesia	Defended the OPMMA Lightweight Championship.
Win	3–1	Ngabdi Mulyadi	TKO (punches)	One Pride MMA Fight Night 9	April 15, 2017	1	2:40	Kelapa Gading, Indonesia	Won the OPMMA Lightweight Championship.
Win	2–1	Victor Johanis	TKO (elbows and punches)	One Pride MMA Fight Night 6	November 5, 2016	2	1:45	Kelapa Gading, Indonesia	
Win	1–1	Rizki Muyla	Submission (keylock)	One Pride MMA Fight Night 5	October 8, 2016	1	1:25	Jakarta, Indonesia	
Loss	0–1	Kevin Sulistio	Submission (kimura)	One Pride MMA Fight Night 4	September 10, 2016	1	2:06	Kelapa Gading, Indonesia	Lightweight debut.

== See also ==
- List of male mixed martial artists
