= Rinya Nakamura =

Japanese mixed martial artist and freestyle wrestler

- Born: 中村倫也; 23 March 1995 (age 31); Saitama, Japan
- Other names: Hybrid
- Height: 5 ft 7 in (170 cm)
- Weight: 136 lb (62 kg; 9 st 10 lb)
- Division: Bantamweight
- Reach: 68 in (173 cm)
- Fighting out of: Saitama, Japan
- Team: LDH Martial Arts (2021 - 2025); American Top Team (2025 - present)
- Wrestling: Freestyle wrestling
- Years active: 2021–present (MMA); 2011–2020 (wrestling)

Mixed martial arts record
- Total: 12
- Wins: 10
- By knockout: 6
- By submission: 1
- By decision: 3
- Losses: 2
- By submission: 1
- By decision: 1

Other information
- University: Senshu University
- Mixed martial arts record from Sherdog

Rinya Nakamura (Japanese: 中村倫也, Nakamura Rinya; born 23 March 1995) is a Japanese mixed martial artist and former freestyle wrestler who currently competes in the bantamweight division. Competing at 61 kilograms, Nakamura became the 2017 U23 World Champion during his wrestling career, before retiring at age 25 to pursue mixed martial arts.

== Background ==
Rinya is the son of Kozo Nakamura, who was involved in the early development of Shooto in the 90's. Having begun wrestling at the age of five, Nakamura's first notable accomplishment in the sport of freestyle wrestling was a bronze medal from the Cadet World Championships in 2011. A multiple-time Japanese National medalist at two different weight classes, his most remarkable achievement of his career came at the 2017 U23 World Championships, where he became the champion at 61 kilograms. After the delay of the 2020 Summer Olympics due to the COVID-19 pandemic, Nakamura announced his retirement from wrestling in order to pursue a career in mixed martial arts.

== Mixed martial arts career ==
=== Early career ===
In April 2020, Nakamura announced his serious intentions of competing in MMA. Nakamura made his professional debut against Takumi Arai in a mixed martial arts reality show Fighting Dreamers on 15 May 2021. He won the fight via first-minute knockout.

He then made his sophomore appearance against Akuri Ronda at Shooto 0725 on 25 July 2021. He won the bout via second-round knockout.

Nakamura faced Yasuyuki Nojiri at Shooto 0116 on January 16, 2022. He won the fight via first-minute technical knockout.

On April 24, 2022, he fought against Aliandro Caetano in POUNDSTORM, and although he was punched in round 1 and cut his right eyelid leading to intense bleeding, he utilised his takedown advantage and won the 3–0 decision.

=== Road to UFC ===
Nakamura faced Gugun Gusman in the Quarter-Finals of the Bantamweight tournament on June 9, 2022, in Road to UFC Season 1: Episode 3. He won the bout in the first round via Americana submission.

Nakamura faced Shohei Nose in the Semi-Finals of the Bantamweight tournament on October 23, 2022, at Road to UFC Season 1: Episode 6. He won the bout in the first round, knocking out Nose.

In the finals of the tournament, Nakamura faced Toshiomi Kazama on February 4, 2023, at UFC Fight Night: Lewis vs. Spivac. He won the fight via knockout in the first round. This win earned Nakamura his first Performance of the Night bonus award.

=== Ultimate Fighting Championship ===
Nakamura faced Fernie Garcia at UFC Fight Night 225 on August 26, 2023. He won the bout in dominant fashion via unanimous decision.

Nakamura was scheduled to face Brady Hiestand on February 17, 2024, at UFC 298. However, Hiestand pulled out due injury and was replaced by promotional newcomer Carlos Vera. Nakamura dominated most of the bout on the ground and won by unanimous decision.

Nakamura faced Muin Gafurov on January 18, 2025, at UFC 311. He lost the fight by unanimous decision, leading to his first loss in mixed martial arts.

Nakamura faced Nathan Fletcher on August 2, 2025, at UFC on ESPN 71. He won the fight by technical knockout via a body kick one minute into the first round.

Nakamura was scheduled to face Luan Lacerda on March 14, 2026, at UFC Fight Night 269. However, Nakamura withdrew for undisclosed reasons and was replaced by promotional newcomer Hecher Sosa.

Nakamura's bout with Brady Hiestand was rebooked and took place on September 26, 2026 at UFC Fight Night 289. Nakamura lost the fight via a rear-naked choke submission in the second round.

== Championships and accomplishments ==
=== Mixed martial arts ===
- Ultimate Fighting Championship
  - Performance of the Night (One time) vs. Toshiomi Kazama
  - Road to UFC Season 1 Bantamweight Tournament Winner
  - UFC.com Awards
    - 2023: Ranked #10 Newcomer of the Year

== Mixed martial arts record ==
Professional record breakdown
12 matches	10 wins	2 losses
By knockout	6	0
By submission	1	1
By decision	3	1

Res.	Record	Opponent	Method	Event	Date	Round	Time	Location	Notes
Loss	10–2	Brady Hiestand	Submission (rear-naked choke)	UFC Fight Night: Rosas Jr. vs. Barcelos	September 26, 2026	2	4:07	Las Vegas, Nevada, United States	
Win	10–1	Nathan Fletcher	TKO (body kick and punches)	UFC on ESPN: Taira vs. Park	August 2, 2025	1	1:02	Las Vegas, Nevada, United States	
Loss	9–1	Muin Gafurov	Decision (unanimous)	UFC 311	January 18, 2025	3	5:00	Inglewood, California, United States	
Win	9–0	Carlos Vera	Decision (unanimous)	UFC 298	February 17, 2024	3	5:00	Anaheim, California, United States	
Win	8–0	Fernie Garcia	Decision (unanimous)	UFC Fight Night: Holloway vs. The Korean Zombie	August 26, 2023	3	5:00	Kallang, Singapore	
Win	7–0	Toshiomi Kazama	KO (punch)	UFC Fight Night: Lewis vs. Spivac	February 4, 2023	1	0:33	Las Vegas, Nevada, United States	Won the Road to UFC Season 1 Bantamweight Tournament. Performance of the Night.
Win	6–0	Shohei Nose	KO (punches)	Road to UFC Season 1: Episode 6	October 23, 2022	1	2:21	Abu Dhabi, United Arab Emirates	Road to UFC Season 1 Bantamweight Tournament Semifinal.
Win	5–0	Gugun Gusman	Submission (keylock)	Road to UFC Season 1: Episode 3	June 10, 2022	1	3:24	Kallang, Singapore	Road to UFC Season 1 Bantamweight Tournament Quarterfinal.
Win	4–0	Aleandro Caetano	Decision (unanimous)	LDH Martial Arts: Pound Storm	April 24, 2022	3	5:00	Tokyo, Japan	
Win	3–0	Yasuyuki Nojiri	TKO (punches)	Shooto: 2022 Vol. 1	January 16, 2022	1	0:25	Tokyo, Japan	
Win	2–0	Akuri Ronda	KO (head kick)	Shooto: 2021 Vol. 5	July 25, 2021	2	0:20	Tokyo, Japan	
Win	1–0	Takumi Arai	KO (punch)	LDH Martial Arts: Fighting Dreamers	May 15, 2021	1	0:42	Tokyo, Japan	Bantamweight debut.

== Freestyle record ==
Senior Freestyle Matches
Res.	Record	Opponent	Score	Date	Event	Location
2019 Japan Nationals (silver) at 65 kg
Loss	36–9	(Japan) Takuto Otoguro	TF 0–10	19–22 December 2019	2019 Japanese National Championships	Tokyo, Japan
Win	36–8	(Japan) Takuma Taniyama	TF 11–0	19–22 December 2019	2019 Japanese National Championships	Tokyo, Japan
Win	35–8	(Japan) Masakazu Kamoi	9–5	19–22 December 2019	2019 Japanese National Championships	Tokyo, Japan
Win	34–8	(Japan) Isojiro	TF 11–0	19–22 December 2019	2019 Japanese National Championships	Tokyo, Japan
Win	33–8	(Japan) Yamato Hagiwara	4–2	19–22 December 2019	2019 Japanese National Championships	Tokyo, Japan
2018 Japan Nationals (bronze) at 65 kg
Win		(Japan) Rei Higuchi	INJ	20–23 December 2018	2018 Japanese National Championships	Tokyo, Japan
Win	32–8	(Japan) Hirotaka Abe	8–3	20–23 December 2018	2018 Japanese National Championships	Tokyo, Japan
Loss	31–8	(Japan) Takuto Otoguro	TF 0–10	20–23 December 2018	2018 Japanese National Championships	Tokyo, Japan
Win	31–7	(Japan) Fukuda Toki	TF 12–2	20–23 December 2018	2018 Japanese National Championships	Tokyo, Japan
Win	30–7	(Japan) Takuya Funaki	TF 10–0	20–23 December 2018	2018 Japanese National Championships	Tokyo, Japan
2018 Meiji Cup DNP at 65 kg
Loss		(Japan) Hirotaka Abe	INJ	14–17 June 2018	2018 Meiji Cup (JPN World Team Trials)	Tokyo, Japan
Win	29–7	(Japan) Koki Terada	13–7	14–17 June 2018	2018 Meiji Cup (JPN World Team Trials)	Tokyo, Japan
2018 World Cup (bronze) for Team JPN at 61 kg
Win	28–7	(India) Sandeep Tomar	TF 11–0	7–8 April 2018	2018 World Cup	(United States) Iowa City, Iowa
Win	27–7	(Georgia (country)) Lasha Lomtadze	9–2	7–8 April 2018	2018 World Cup	(United States) Iowa City, Iowa
2017 U23 World Championships (gold) at 61 kg
Win	26–7	(Kazakhstan) Kuat Amirtaev	TF 12–2	21–26 November 2017	2017 U23 World Championships	Bydgoszcz, Poland
Win	25–7	(Russia) Islam Dudaev	TF 10–0	21–26 November 2017	2017 U23 World Championships	Bydgoszcz, Poland
Win	24–7	(Belarus) Husein Shakhbanau	10–4	21–26 November 2017	2017 U23 World Championships	Bydgoszcz, Poland
Win	23–7	(Austria) Gabriel Janatsch	TF 11–0	21–26 November 2017	2017 U23 World Championships	Bydgoszcz, Poland
2017 World Championships 5th at 61 kg
Loss	22–7	(Cuba) Yowlys Bonne	Fall	25 August 2017	2017 World Championships	Paris, France
Win	22–6	(Slovakia) Mykola Bolotňuk	TF 10–0	25 August 2017	2017 World Championships	Paris, France
Win	21–6	(Kyrgyzstan) Alibek Osmonov	TF 10–0	25 August 2017	2017 World Championships	Paris, France
Loss	20–6	(Azerbaijan) Haji Aliyev	1–10	25 August 2017	2017 World Championships	Paris, France
Win	20–5	(Moldova) Andrei Prepeliţă	7–3	25 August 2017	2017 World Championships	Paris, France
2017 Meiji Cup (gold) at 61 kg
Win	19–5	(Japan) Rei Higuchi	9–5	16–18 June 2017	2017 Meiji Cup (JPN World Team Trials)	Tokyo, Japan
Win	18–5	(Japan) Rei Higuchi	14–5	16–18 June 2017	2017 Meiji Cup (JPN World Team Trials)	Tokyo, Japan
Win	17–5	(Japan) Shoya Shimae	TF 10–0	16–18 June 2017	2017 Meiji Cup (JPN World Team Trials)	Tokyo, Japan
Win	16–5	(Japan) Sakaki Daimu	TF 10–0	16–18 June 2017	2017 Meiji Cup (JPN World Team Trials)	Tokyo, Japan
2017 Dan Kolov - Nikola Petrov International 9th at 61 kg
Loss	15–5	(Kazakhstan) Timur Aitkulov	Fall	8–9 April 2017	2017 Dan Kolov - Nikola Petrov Memorial	Madrid, Spain
Win	15–4	(Kazakhstan) Kairat Amirtayev	TF 12–1	8–9 April 2017	2017 Dan Kolov - Nikola Petrov Memorial	Madrid, Spain
Win	14–4	(Algeria) Amar Laissaoui	Fall	8–9 April 2017	2017 Dan Kolov - Nikola Petrov Memorial	Madrid, Spain
2016 Meiji Cup (gold) at 57 kg
Win	13–4	(Japan) Yuki Takahashi	TF 10–0	27–29 May 2016	2016 Meiji Cup (JPN World Team Trials)	Tokyo, Japan
Win	12–4	(Japan) Gaku Akazawa	TF 10–0	27–29 May 2016	2016 Meiji Cup (JPN World Team Trials)	Tokyo, Japan
Win	11–4	(Japan) Toshihiro Hasegawa	TF 10–0	27–29 May 2016	2016 Meiji Cup (JPN World Team Trials)	Tokyo, Japan
2015 Japan Nationals (bronze) at 57 kg
Win	10–4	(Japan) Yasuhiro Morita	TF 10–0	21–23 December 2015	2015 Japanese National Championships	Tokyo, Japan
Loss	9–4	(Japan) Rei Higuchi	6–8	21–23 December 2015	2015 Japanese National Championships	Tokyo, Japan
Win	9–3	(Japan) Gaku Akazawa	TF 14–4	21–23 December 2015	2015 Japanese National Championships	Tokyo, Japan
Win	8–3	(Japan) Yasuhiro Inaba	TF 10–0	21–23 December 2015	2015 Japanese National Championships	Tokyo, Japan
2015 Spain Grand Prix (silver) at 57 kg
Loss	7–3	(South Korea) Sung Gwon Kim	0–1	11 July 2015	2015 Grand Prix of Spain	Madrid, Spain
Win	7–2	(Spain) Juan Pablo Gonzalez	9–1	11 July 2015	2015 Grand Prix of Spain	Madrid, Spain
Win	6–2	(South Africa) Marco Coetzee	TF 10–0	11 July 2015	2015 Grand Prix of Spain	Madrid, Spain
Win	5–2	(Iran) Amin Nouri	TF 13–2	11 July 2015	2015 Grand Prix of Spain	Madrid, Spain
2015 Meiji Cup (bronze) at 57 kg
Win	4–2	(Japan) Yasuhiro Morita	TF 11–0	19–21 June 2015	2015 Meiji Cup (JPN World Team Trials)	Tokyo, Japan
Loss	3–2	(Japan) Yuki Takahashi	0–5	19–21 June 2015	2015 Meiji Cup (JPN World Team Trials)	Tokyo, Japan
Win	3–1	(Japan) Kazuaki Oshiro	TF 10–0	19–21 June 2015	2015 Meiji Cup (JPN World Team Trials)	Tokyo, Japan
Win	2–1	(Japan) Toshihiro Hasegawa	TF 14–4	19–21 June 2015	2015 Meiji Cup (JPN World Team Trials)	Tokyo, Japan
2014 Japan Nationals DNP at 57 kg
Loss	1–1	(Japan) Fumitaka Morishita	2–4	21–23 December 2014	2014 Japanese National Championships	Tokyo, Japan
Win	1–0	(Japan) Rei Kuwagi	9–7	21–23 December 2014	2014 Japanese National Championships	Tokyo, Japan

== See also ==
- List of current UFC fighters
- List of male mixed martial artists
