= Wuliji Buren =

Chinese mixed martial arts fighter

- Born: 乌力吉布仁; March 1, 1990 (age 36); Chifeng, China
- Other names: The Beastmaster
- Nationality: Chinese
- Height: 5 ft 9 in (1.75 m)
- Weight: 136 lb (62 kg; 9 st 10 lb)
- Division: Bantamweight; Featherweight
- Reach: 69.0 in (175 cm)
- Fighting out of: Beijing, China
- Years active: 2014–present

Mixed martial arts record
- Total: 24
- Wins: 15
- By knockout: 3
- By submission: 8
- By decision: 4
- Losses: 9
- By knockout: 3
- By submission: 2
- By decision: 4

Other information
- Mixed martial arts record from Sherdog

Wuliji Buren (Chinese: 乌力吉布仁; pinyin: Weliji Buren born March 1, 1990) is a Chinese mixed martial artist who competed in the Bantamweight division of the Ultimate Fighting Championship.

== Background ==
Starting out as a Shuai jiao, wrestler, Wuliji Buren competed in the China National Shuai jiao Tournament, where he took third place. After watching UFC for years, in 2013 he retired from the wrestling team and made the decision to do MMA.

== Mixed martial arts career ==
=== Early career ===
In the beginning of his mixed martial arts career, Wuliji fought primarily in Chinese regional scene. After racking up a record of 9–4, he fought for the Chin Woo Men MMA Professional League Featherweight Championship, which he won in the finals with a submission win over Ye Yuan.

=== Ultimate Fighting Championship ===
In his UFC debut, Wuliji Buren faced Rolando Dy in UFC Fight Night: Bisping vs. Gastelum on November 25, 2017. At the weigh-ins, Dy weighed in at 148 lbs., two pounds over the featherweight limit. As a result, he forfeited 20% of his purse to Buren and the bout was fought at a catchweight. Wuliji lost the fight by unanimous decision.

Wuliji faced Marlon Vera on August 8, 2018, at UFC 227. He lost the fight via TKO in the second round.

His next fight came on February 9, 2019, at UFC 234 against Jonathan Martinez. He lost the fight via unanimous decision.

After his third straight loss and inactivity of almost a year, Wuliji Buren was released from the UFC in January 2020.

=== Road to UFC ===
After his release from the UFC, Buren returned to the Chinese regional scene, winning his next three bouts via submission; second round shoulder choke against Aleksandr Lunga at WLF W.A.R.S. 39, second round guillotine at WLF W.A.R.S. 41 against Nikolay Kondratuk, and finally first round arm-triangle choke at Huya FC against Lei Yu. He would lose his next bout at WLF MMA 52 against Keremuaili Maimaitituohati via unanimous decision, before rebounding by winning in 29 seconds via flying knee against Akenbieke Ayijiake.

Nakamura faced Shohei Nose in the quarterfinals of the Bantamweight tournament on June 9, 2022, in Road to UFC Season 1: Episode 4. He lost the bout via TKO due to sustaining a knee injury.

== Mixed martial arts record ==
Professional record breakdown
24 matches	15 wins	9 losses
By knockout	3	3
By submission	8	2
By decision	4	4

Res.	Record	Opponent	Method	Event	Date	Round	Time	Location	Notes
Loss	15–9	Shohei Nose	TKO (knee injury)	Road to UFC Season 1: Episode 4	June 10, 2022	1	1:13	Kallang, Singapore	Return to Bantamweight. Road to UFC Season 1 Bantamweight Quarterfinal.
Win	15–8	Akenbieke Ayijiake	KO (flying knee)	WKG & M-1: 2021 Harbin Bank Chengdu Charity Tournament	September 12, 2021	1	0:29	Chengdu, China	
Loss	14–8	Keremuaili Maimaitituohati	Decision (unanimous)	WLF MMA 52	April 30, 2021	3	5:00	Maotai, China	
Win	14–7	Lei Yu	Submission (arm-triangle choke)	Huya FC 3	December 27, 2020	1	2:54	Zhengzhou, China	Return to Featherweight.
Win	13–7	Nikolay Kondratuk	Submission (guillotine choke)	WLF W.A.R.S. 41	January 3, 2020	2	2:47	Zhengzhou, China	
Win	12–7	Aleksandr Lunga	Submission (shoulder choke)	WLF W.A.R.S. 39	October 18, 2019	2	2:45	Zhengzhou, China	Catchweight (139 lb) bout.
Loss	11–7	Jonathan Martinez	Decision (unanimous)	UFC 234	February 9, 2019	3	5:00	Melbourne, Australia	
Loss	11–6	Marlon Vera	KO (punch to the body)	UFC 227	August 4, 2018	2	4:53	Los Angeles, California, United States	Bantamweight debut.
Loss	11–5	Rolando Dy	Decision (unanimous)	UFC Fight Night: Bisping vs. Gastelum	November 25, 2017	3	5:00	Shanghai, China	Catchweight (148 lb) bout; Dy missed weight.
Win	11–4	Ye Yuan	Submission (guillotine choke)	Chin Woo Men: 2016-2017 Season Final	September 16, 2017	1	N/A	Guangzhou, China	Won the Chin Woo Men Featherweight Championship.
Win	10–4	Rong Zhu	Submission (rear-naked choke)	Chin Woo Men: 2016-2017 Season, Stage 6	April 7, 2017	1	1:37	Guangzhou, China	
Win	9–4	Beno Adamia	TKO (slam)	Superstar Fight 7	January 13, 2017	3	4:26	Changsha, China	Catchweight (139 lb) bout.
Win	8–4	Sirozhiddin Eshanbaev	Submission	Glory of Heroes: Conquest of Heroes 1	December 2, 2016	2	N/A	Jiyuan, China	
Loss	7–4	Dong Gyu Kim	Decision (split)	Art of War 18	July 30, 2016	2	5:00	Beijing, China	
Win	7–3	Roman Lutsenko	Decision (unanimous)	WLF E.P.I.C. 4	May 28, 2016	3	5:00	Zhengzhou, China	
Loss	6–3	Musa Kazikhanov	Submission (triangle choke)	Bullet Fly FC 4	March 26, 2016	3	0:00	Beijing, China	
Loss	6–2	Alexandros Michailidis	TKO (punches)	WLF E.P.I.C. 2	March 13, 2016	1	1:30	Zhengzhou, China	
Loss	6–1	Chengjie Wu	Submission (armbar)	WBK 4: Battle of Kings	June 5, 2015	1	2:45	Ningbo, China	
Win	6–0	Ali El Ezzabi	Decision (split)	Kunlun Fight 12	October 26, 2014	3	5:00	Jianshui, China	Return to Bantamweight.
Win	5–0	Chang Xin Fu	Submission (rear-naked choke)	Chinese Kung Fu Championships	September 21, 2014	1	0:00	Qian'an, China	Lightweight debut.
Win	4–0	Xiaolong Bai	Decision (unanimous)	Chinese Kung Fu Championships	September 19, 2014	3	3:00	Qian'an, China	
Win	3–0	Wulalibieke Baheibieke	Submission (armbar)	Chinese Kung Fu Championships	September 17, 2014	2	1:09	Qian'an, China	
Win	2–0	Chunbo Yuan	TKO (punches)	RUFF 13	June 7, 2014	1	1:26	Shanghai, China	
Win	1–0	Nannan He	Decision (unanimous)	RUFF 12	March 29, 2014	3	5:00	Shanghai, China	Featherweight debut

== See also ==
- List of current UFC fighters
- List of male mixed martial artists
