= UFC on ESPN: Perez vs. Taira =

Mixed martial arts event in 2024

- The poster for UFC on ESPN: Perez vs. Taira
- Promotion: Ultimate Fighting Championship
- Date: June 15, 2024
- Venue: UFC Apex
- City: Enterprise, Nevada, United States
- Attendance: Not announced

Event chronology
UFC on ESPN: Cannonier vs. Imavov	UFC on ESPN: Perez vs. Taira	UFC on ABC: Whittaker vs. Aliskerov

UFC on ESPN: Perez vs. Taira (also known as UFC on ESPN 58 and UFC Vegas 93) was a mixed martial arts event produced by the Ultimate Fighting Championship that took place on June 15, 2024, at the UFC Apex facility, in Enterprise, Nevada, part of the Las Vegas Metropolitan Area, United States.

== Background ==
This was the 100th event the promotion hosted at the UFC Apex. The UFC started hosting events at the venue in May 2020 due to the COVID-19 pandemic, originally behind closed doors, before changing their approach to a limited set of tickets per event in July 2021.

A flyweight bout between former UFC Flyweight Championship challenger Alex Perez and Tatsuro Taira headlined the event. Perez had originally been scheduled to face Tagir Ulanbekov, but he was pulled from that matchup to serve as a replacement and headline UFC on ESPN: Nicolau vs. Perez in April. On April 30, it was reported that the bout between Perez and Ulanbekov had been rebooked for this event. Taira, meanwhile, had been slated to step in as a replacement at UFC 302 two weeks earlier against Joshua Van before being moved to the main event here.

After Perez was shifted into the headliner role, the promotion instead paired Ulanbekov with Van, who had briefly been linked as Taira's opponent at UFC 302. However, the bout was cancelled when Ulanbekov weighed in at 129.5 pounds, three and a half pounds over the flyweight non-title fight limit.

A women's strawweight bout between former LFA Women's Strawweight Champion Julia Polastri and Josefine Lindgren Knutsson took place at the event. They were originally scheduled for UFC Fight Night: Rozenstruik vs. Gaziev but the bout was scrapped when Knutsson pulled out due to injury.

A heavyweight bout between former UFC Heavyweight Champion Andrei Arlovski and Martin Buday was scheduled for this event. However, the bout was moved to UFC 303 for unknown reasons.

A middleweight bout between André Muniz and Ikram Aliskerov was expected to take place at the event. However, Muniz withdrew due to a foot injury. He was replaced by Antonio Trócoli. In turn, the bout was scrapped during fight week as Aliskerov was pulled in order to serve as a replacement for Khamzat Chimaev against Robert Whittaker a week later in the main event of UFC on ABC: Whittaker vs. Aliskerov.

== Results ==
Main card (ESPN2 / ESPN+)
Weight class				Method	Round	Time	Notes
Flyweight	Tatsuro Taira	def.	Alex Perez	TKO (knee injury)	2	2:59
Bantamweight	Miles Johns	def.	Douglas Silva de Andrade	Decision (unanimous) (30–27, 30–27, 29–28)	3	5:00
Featherweight	Lucas Almeida	def.	Timothy Cuamba	Decision (unanimous) (29–28, 29–28, 29–28)	3	5:00
Bantamweight	Brady Hiestand	def.	Garrett Armfield	Submission (rear-naked choke)	3	1:52
Flyweight	Asu Almabayev	def.	Jose Johnson	Decision (unanimous) (30–27, 30–27, 30–27)	3	5:00
Welterweight	Adam Fugitt	def.	Josh Quinlan	Decision (split) (29–28, 28–29, 29–28)	3	5:00
Preliminary card (ESPN2 / ESPN+)
Flyweight	Nate Maness	def.	Jimmy Flick	Decision (unanimous) (30–27, 30–27, 29–28)	3	5:00
Women's Flyweight	Gabriella Fernandes	def.	Carli Judice	Decision (split) (29–28, 28–29, 29–28)	3	5:00
Featherweight	Westin Wilson	def.	Jeka Saragih	Submission (triangle armbar)	1	1:49
Featherweight	Melquizael Costa	def.	Shayilan Nuerdanbieke	Submission (face crank)	3	1:50
Women's Strawweight	Josefine Lindgren Knutsson	def.	Julia Polastri	Decision (unanimous) (29–28, 29–28, 29–28)	3	5:00

== Bonus awards ==
The following fighters received $50,000 bonuses.

- Fight of the Night: Gabriella Fernandes vs. Carli Judice
- Performance of the Night: Tatsuro Taira and Brady Hiestand

== See also ==
- 2024 in UFC
- List of current UFC fighters
- List of UFC events
