= UFC 302 =

2024 mixed martial event in Newark, NJ, USA

UFC 302: Makhachev vs. Poirier
- The poster for UFC 302: Makhachev vs. Poirier
- Promotion: Ultimate Fighting Championship
- Date: June 1, 2024
- Venue: Prudential Center
- City: Newark, New Jersey, United States
- Attendance: 17,834
- Total gate: $7,255,040
- Buyrate: 410,000

Event chronology
UFC Fight Night: Barboza vs. Murphy	UFC 302: Makhachev vs. Poirier	UFC on ESPN: Cannonier vs. Imavov

UFC 302: Makhachev vs. Poirier was a mixed martial arts event produced by the Ultimate Fighting Championship that took place on June 1, 2024, at the Prudential Center, in Newark, New Jersey, United States.

== Background ==
The event marked the promotion's tenth visit to Newark and first since UFC 288 in May 2023.

The debut of the new UFC Official Fight Gloves took place at this event.

A UFC Lightweight Championship bout between current champion Islam Makhachev and former interim champion Dustin Poirier headlined the event.

A five-round middleweight bout between former UFC Middleweight Champion Sean Strickland and former title challenger Paulo Costa took place in the co-main event.

A heavyweight bout between former Bellator Heavyweight World Champion Alexander Volkov and Jailton Almeida was expected to take place at this event. However, the bout was scrapped for unknown reasons and Volkov was booked for UFC on ABC: Whittaker vs. Chimaev against former interim UFC Heavyweight Championship challenger Sergei Pavlovich. Almeida faced Alexander Romanov instead.

A women's strawweight bout between former Invicta FC Atomweight Champion Michelle Waterson-Gomez and Gillian Robertson was scheduled for the event. However, the bout was postponed to UFC 303 for unknown reasons.

Jeremiah Wells was expected to face Niko Price in a welterweight bout. However, Wells pulled out due to undisclosed reasons and was replaced by Alex Morono. Price and Morono previously met at UFC Fight Night: Bermudez vs. The Korean Zombie in February 2017, with the bout originally ending via second-round knockout for Price, before ultimately being overturned to a no contest due to him testing positive for marijuana.

Su Mudaerji and Joshua Van were expected to meet in a flyweight bout at this event. However, Su pulled out in late April due to undisclosed reasons. He was replaced by Tatsuro Taira. In turn, both fighters were moved to UFC on ESPN: Perez vs. Taira two weeks later, where Taira faced a different opponent and Van's bout was ultimately cancelled.

A middleweight bout between Roman Dolidze and former LFA Middleweight Champion Anthony Hernandez was scheduled to take place at the event. However, Hernandez was forced out of the bout due to a torn ligament in his hand.

Road to UFC Season 1 flyweight winner Park Hyun-sung was expected to face André Lima. However, he pulled out due to a knee injury and was replaced by promotional newcomer Nyamjargal Tumendemberel. In turn, Tumendemberel was forced to withdraw from the event due to visa issues and was replaced by Mitch Raposo. At the weigh ins, Lima weighed in at 130 pounds, four pounds over the flyweight non-title fight limit. The bout proceeded at catchweight and he was fined 30 percent of his purse which went to Raposo.

== Results ==
Main card
Weight class				Method	Round	Time	Notes
Lightweight	Islam Makhachev (c)	def.	Dustin Poirier	Submission (brabo choke)	5	2:42	(Note: For the UFC Lightweight Championship.)
Middleweight	Sean Strickland	def.	Paulo Costa	Decision (split) (46–49, 50–45, 49–46)	5	5:00
Middleweight	Kevin Holland	def.	Michał Oleksiejczuk	Technical Submission (armbar)	1	1:34
Welterweight	Niko Price	def.	Alex Morono	Decision (unanimous) (29–28, 29–28, 29–28)	3	5:00
Welterweight	Randy Brown	def.	Elizeu Zaleski dos Santos	Decision (unanimous) (29–28, 29–28, 29–28)	3	5:00
Preliminary card (ESPN 2 / ESPN+)
Middleweight	Roman Kopylov	def.	César Almeida	Decision (split) (29–28, 28–29, 30–27)	3	5:00
Heavyweight	Jailton Almeida	def.	Alexander Romanov	Submission (rear-naked choke)	1	2:27
Lightweight	Grant Dawson	def.	Joe Solecki	Decision (unanimous) (29–28, 30–27, 30–27)	3	5:00
Welterweight	Jake Matthews	def.	Philip Rowe	Decision (unanimous) (29–28, 29–28, 30–27)	3	5:00
Early preliminary card (ESPN+ / UFC Fight Pass)
Welterweight	Bassil Hafez	def.	Mickey Gall	Decision (unanimous) (30–27, 30–27, 29–28)	3	5:00
Women's Bantamweight	Ailín Pérez	def.	Joselyne Edwards	Decision (unanimous) (30–27, 29–28, 29–28)	3	5:00
Catchweight (130 lb)	André Lima	def.	Mitch Raposo	Decision (split) (30–27, 28–29, 30–27)	3	5:00

== Bonus awards ==
The following fighters received $50,000 bonuses.

- Fight of the Night: Islam Makhachev vs. Dustin Poirier
- Performance of the Night: Islam Makhachev and Kevin Holland

== See also ==
- 2024 in UFC
- List of current UFC fighters
- List of UFC events
