= Park Hyun-sung =

South Korean mixed martial artist

- Born: November 4, 1995 (age 30); Gyeonggi Province, South Korea
- Native name: 박현성
- Other names: Peace of Mind
- Height: 5 ft 7 in (1.70 m)
- Weight: 125 lb (57 kg; 8 st 13 lb)
- Division: Flyweight
- Reach: 66 in (168 cm)
- Fighting out of: Gyeonggi Province, South Korea
- Team: MMA Story
- Years active: 2018–present

Mixed martial arts record
- Total: 12
- Wins: 10
- By knockout: 4
- By submission: 5
- By decision: 1
- Losses: 2
- By submission: 2

Other information
- Mixed martial arts record from Sherdog

Park Hyun‑sung (Korean: 박현성; born November 4, 1995), anglicized as Hyun Sung Park or HyunSung Park, is a South Korean mixed martial artist. He currently competes in the flyweight division of the Ultimate Fighting Championship.

== Early life ==
Park was born in Gyeonggi Province, South Korea on November 4, 1995. He began training at MMA Story in Seoul and competed as an amateur in multiple Road FC events in 2018. Park earned his nickname "Peace of Mind" due to his calm demeanour both in training and competition.

== Mixed martial arts career ==
=== Early career ===
Park made his professional MMA debut in November 2018 under the banner of Double G Fighting Championship, he exclusively competed for this promotion amassing a 5-0 record including winning their Flyweight title.

=== Road to UFC ===
In May 2022, it was reported that Park earned a spot on Road to UFC Season 1 competing in the Flyweight tournament.

In the quarterfinal, Park faced Jeremia Siregar on June 10, 2022, at Road to UFC Season 1: Episode 4. He won the fight via technical knockout in round one.

In the Semifinal, Park faced Topnoi Kiwram on October 23, 2022, at Road to UFC Season 1: Episode 6. He won the fight via a rear-naked choke in one.

In the final, Park faced Choi Seung-guk on February 4, 2023, at UFC Fight Night 218. He won the fight via third-round submission.

=== Ultimate Fighting Championship ===
Park faced Shannon Ross on December 9, 2023, at UFC Fight Night 233. He won the fight by second-round technical knockout. This fight earned him his first Performance of the Night award.

Park was scheduled to face André Lima on June 1, 2024, at UFC 302. However, Park pulled out from the event due to a knee injury and was replaced by promotional newcomer Nyamjargal Tumendemberel.

Park was scheduled to face Nyamjargal Tumendemberel on February 8, 2025, at UFC 312. However, the bout was canceled due to a weight management issue with Nyamjargal.

Park faced Carlos Herandez on May 17, 2025, at UFC Fight Night 256. He would win the fight via first-round submission.

Replacing Alex Perez, who withdrew due to undisclosed reasons, Park was scheduled to face Steve Erceg on August 9, 2025, at UFC on ESPN 72. However, Park was then scheduled to step in to face Tatsuro Taira in the main event of UFC on ESPN 71 a week earlier on August 2, 2025, after Taira's original opponent Amir Albazi had to withdraw due to injury. Park lost via a face crank submission in the second round leading to his first loss in mixed martial arts.

Park faced Bruno Gustavo da Silva on October 18, 2025 at UFC Fight Night 262. He lost the fight via a rear-naked choke submission in the third round.

== Championships and accomplishments ==
- Ultimate Fighting Championship
  - Performance of the Night (One time) vs. Shannon Ross
  - Road to UFC Season 1 Flyweight Tournament Winner

== Mixed martial arts record ==
Professional record breakdown
12 matches	10 wins	2 losses
By knockout	4	0
By submission	5	2
By decision	1	0

Res.	Record	Opponent	Method	Event	Date	Round	Time	Location	Notes
Loss	10–2	Bruno Gustavo da Silva	Submission (rear-naked choke)	UFC Fight Night: de Ridder vs. Allen	October 18, 2025	3	2:15	Vancouver, British Columbia, Canada	
Loss	10–1	Tatsuro Taira	Submission (face crank)	UFC on ESPN: Taira vs. Park	August 2, 2025	2	1:06	Las Vegas, Nevada, United States	
Win	10–0	Carlos Hernandez	Submission (rear-naked choke)	UFC Fight Night: Burns vs. Morales	May 17, 2025	1	2:26	Las Vegas, Nevada, United States	
Win	9–0	Shannon Ross	TKO (knee and punches)	UFC Fight Night: Song vs. Gutiérrez	December 9, 2023	2	3:59	Las Vegas, Nevada, United States	Performance of the Night.
Win	8–0	Choi Seung-guk	Submission (rear-naked choke)	UFC Fight Night: Lewis vs. Spivac	February 4, 2023	3	3:11	Las Vegas, Nevada, United States	Won the Road to UFC Season 1 Flyweight Tournament.
Win	7–0	Topnoi Kiwram	Submission (rear-naked choke)	Road to UFC Season 1: Episode 6	October 23, 2022	1	3:05	Abu Dhabi, United Arab Emirates	Road to UFC Season 1 Flyweight Tournament Semifinal.
Win	6–0	Jeremia Siregar	TKO (punches)	Road to UFC Season 1: Episode 4	June 10, 2022	1	3:56	Kallang, Singapore	Road to UFC Season 1 Flyweight Tournament Quarterfinal.
Win	5–0	Kim Joo-hwan	KO (knee)	Double G FC 11	December 30, 2021	2	3:40	Seoul, South Korea	Won the vacant Double G FC Flyweight Championship.
Win	4–0	Kim Se-hyun	Submission (rear-naked choke)	Double G FC 6	March 19, 2021	1	4:01	Seoul, South Korea	Catchweight (130 lb) bout.
Win	3–0	Seo Dong-hyun	KO (knee and punches)	Double G FC 5	November 28, 2020	1	2:09	Seoul, South Korea	
Win	2–0	Tsubasa Akiyama	Submission (rear-naked choke)	Double G FC 2	March 30, 2019	2	0:40	Seoul, South Korea	
Win	1–0	Kwon Min-soo	Decision (unanimous)	Double G FC 1	November 18, 2018	3	5:00	Seoul, South Korea	Flyweight debut.

== See also ==
- List of current UFC fighters
- List of male mixed martial artists
- Road to UFC
