= Road to UFC Season 1 =

Mixed martial arts competition

Information
- Promotion: UFC
- First date aired: June 9, 2022

Road to UFC Season 1 is the 2022 cycle of Road to UFC, a mixed martial arts event series in which top Asian MMA prospects compete to win contracts with the Ultimate Fighting Championship (UFC). It features four divisions—flyweight, bantamweight, featherweight and lightweight—each for which eight fighters compete in a "win-and-advance" tournament format. The tournament winner for each division is awarded a UFC contract. Each event in the series features five bouts including one non-tournament bout.

The opening quarterfinal round of the tournament was held across two days, June 9–10, 2022 at Singapore Indoor Stadium, with two five-bout events for each day for a total of 10 bouts per day, ahead of the pay-per-view event UFC 275 on June 11. The contestants for the tournament came from China (through the UFC Academy), India, Indonesia, Japan, Korea, the Philippines, and Thailand. The semifinals took place on October 23, 2022 – a day after UFC 281 – in Abu Dhabi, UAE. The finals were initially scheduled to take place in Seoul, South Korea on February 4, 2023 at UFC Fight Night: Lewis vs. Spivak. However, the location for the event was changed to Las Vegas, Nevada with the date kept intact.

== Episode 1 ==
Road to UFC: Episode 1
- Promotion: Road to UFC
- Date: June 9, 2022
- Venue: Singapore Indoor Stadium
- City: Kallang, Singapore

Main Card (UFC Fight Pass)
Weight class				Method	Round	Time	Notes
Featherweight	Yi Zha	def.	Keisuke Sasu	Submission (rear-naked choke)	1	2:14	(Note: Featherweight quarterfinals)
Lightweight	Ki Won Bin	def.	Jinnosuke Kashimura	TKO (elbows)	1	4:45	(Note: Lightweight quarterfinals)
Bantamweight	Toshiomi Kazama	def.	Maimaitituoheti Keremuaili	Decision (unanimous) (30–27, 30–27, 29–28)	3	5:00	(Note: Bantamweight quarterfinals)
Flyweight	Choi Seung Guk	def.	Rama Supandhi	Decision (unanimous) (30–27, 30–27, 30–27)	3	5:00	(Note: Flyweight quarterfinals)
Light Heavyweight	Zhang Mingyang	def.	Tuco Tokkos	KO (punches)	1	3:57

== Episode 2 ==
Road to UFC: Episode 2
- Promotion: Road to UFC
- Date: June 9, 2022
- Venue: Singapore Indoor Stadium
- City: Kallang, Singapore

Main Card (UFC Fight Pass)
Weight class				Method	Round	Time	Notes
Featherweight	Koyomi Matsushima	def.	Jun Young Hong	Decision (split) (28–29, 30–27, 30–27)	3	5:00	(Note: Featherweight quarterfinals)
Flyweight	Qiu Lun	def.	Wallen Del Rosario	Decision (unanimous) (30–27, 30–27, 30–27)	3	5:00	(Note: Flyweight quarterfinals)
Lightweight	Jeka Saragih	def.	Pawan Maan Singh	KO (spinning backfist)	3	2:24	(Note: Lightweight quarterfinals)
Flyweight	Takeru Uchida	def.	Shaun Etchell	Submission (rear-naked choke)	1	3:26

== Episode 3 ==
Road to UFC: Episode 3
- Promotion: Road to UFC
- Date: June 10, 2022
- Venue: Singapore Indoor Stadium
- City: Kallang, Singapore

Main Card (UFC Fight Pass)
Weight class				Method	Round	Time	Notes
Featherweight	Lee Jeong-yeong	def.	Xie Bin	Submission (armbar)	1	0:36	(Note: Featherweight quarterfinals)
Flyweight	Topnoi Kiwram	def.	Yuma Horiuchi	Decision (unanimous) (29–28, 29–27, 29–27)	3	5:00	(Note: Flyweight quarterfinals)
Bantamweight	Rinya Nakamura	def.	Gugun Gusman	Submission (keylock)	1	3:24	(Note: Bantamweight quarterfinals)
Women's Strawweight	Josefine Lindgren Knutsson	def.	Seo Ye Dam	Decision (unanimous) (30–27, 30–27, 30–26)	3	5:00

== Episode 4 ==
Road to UFC: Episode 4
- Promotion: Road to UFC
- Date: June 10, 2022
- Venue: Singapore Indoor Stadium
- City: Kallang, Singapore

Main Card (UFC Fight Pass)
Weight class				Method	Round	Time	Notes
Bantamweight	Shohei Nose	def.	Wuliji Buren	TKO (knee injury)	1	1:13	(Note: Bantamweight quarterfinals)
Lightweight	Kim Kyung Pyo	def.	Asikeerbai Jinensibieke	KO (punches)	1	0:30	(Note: Lightweight quarterfinals)
Featherweight	Lu Kai	def.	Angga Hans	TKO (punches)	2	4:33	(Note: Featherweight quarterfinals)
Flyweight	Park Hyun Sung	def.	Jeremia Siregar	TKO (punches)	1	3:56	(Note: Flyweight quarterfinals)
Welterweight	Han Seul Kim	def.	John Adajar	Submission (triangle armbar)	1	4:37

== Episode 5 ==
Road to UFC: Episode 5
- Promotion: Road to UFC
- Date: October 23, 2022
- Venue: Etihad Arena
- City: Abu Dhabi, United Arab Emirates

Main Card (UFC Fight Pass)
Weight class				Method	Round	Time	Notes
Featherweight	Yi Zha	def.	Koyomi Matsushima	Decision (split) (27–30, 29–28, 29–28)	3	5:00	(Note: Featherweight semifinals)
Flyweight	Choi Seung Guk	def.	Qiu Lun	Decision (unanimous) (29–28, 29–28, 29–28)	3	5:00	(Note: Flyweight semifinals)
Lightweight	Jeka Saragih	def.	Ki Won Bin	KO (punch)	1	2:41	(Note: Lightweight semifinals)
Featherweight	Keisuke Sasu	def.	Balajin	Decision (unanimous) (30–27, 30–27, 29–28)	3	5:00

== Episode 6 ==
Road to UFC: Episode 6
- Promotion: Road to UFC
- Date: October 23, 2022
- Venue: Etihad Arena
- City: Abu Dhabi, United Arab Emirates

Main Card (UFC Fight Pass)
Weight class				Method	Round	Time	Notes
Featherweight	Lee Jeong-yeong	def.	Lu Kai	KO (punches)	1	0:42	(Note: Featherweight semifinals)
Bantamweight	Rinya Nakamura	def.	Shohei Nose	KO (punches)	1	2:21	(Note: Bantamweight semifinals)
Flyweight	Park Hyun Sung	def.	Topnoi Kiwram	Submission (rear-naked choke)	1	3:05	(Note: Flyweight semifinals)
Lightweight	Anshul Jubli	def.	Kim Kyung Pyo	Decision (split) (29–28, 28–29, 29–28)	3	5:00	(Note: Lightweight semifinals)
Catchweight (175 lbs)	Samandar Murodov	def.	Gian Siqueira	Submission (rear-naked choke)	1	4:59	(Note: Siqueira missed weight (175 lbs))

== Flyweight tournament bracket ==
Quarter-finals
(South Korea) Choi Seung Guk	UD
(Indonesia) Rama Supandhi	3
(China) Qiu Lun	UD
(Philippines) Wallen Del Rosario	3
(Thailand) Topnoi Kiwram	UD
(Japan) Yuma Horiuchi	3
(South Korea) Park Hyun Sung	TKO
(Indonesia) Jeremia Siregar	1

Semi-finals
(South Korea) Choi Seung Guk	UD
(China) Qiu Lun	3
(Thailand) Topnoi Kiwram	1
(South Korea) Park Hyun Sung	SUB

Final
(South Korea) Choi Seung Guk	3
(South Korea) Park Hyun Sung	SUB

== Bantamweight tournament bracket ==
Quarter-finals
(Japan) Shohei Nose	TKO
(China) Wuliji Buren	1
(Japan) Rinya Nakamura	SUB
(Indonesia) Gugun Gusman	1
(South Korea) Kim Min Woo*	BYE
(China) Xiao Long	—
(Japan) Toshiomi Kazama	UD
(China) Maimaitituoheti Keremuaili	3

Semi-finals
(Japan) Shohei Nose	1
(Japan) Rinya Nakamura	TKO
(South Korea) Kim Min Woo	—
(Japan) Toshiomi Kazama**	BYE

Final
(Japan) Rinya Nakamura	KO
(Japan) Toshiomi Kazama	1

* Xiao Long withdrew due to illness during fight week and no replacement was able to be found.
** Min Woo Kim missed weight (139.5 lbs), therefore the bout was canceled and Kazama proceeded to final

== Featherweight tournament bracket ==
Quarter-finals
(China) Lu Kai	TKO
(Indonesia) Angga Hans	2
(South Korea) Lee Jeong Yeong	SUB
(China) Xie Bin	1
(Japan) Koyomi Matsushima	SD
(South Korea) Hong Jun Young	3
(China) Yi Zha	SUB
(Japan) Keisuke Sasu	1

Semi-finals
(China) Lu Kai	1
(South Korea) Lee Jeong Yeong	KO
(Japan) Koyomi Matsushima	3
(China) Yi Zha	SD

Final
(South Korea) Lee Jeong Yeong	SD
(China) Yi Zha	3

== Lightweight tournament bracket ==
Quarter-finals
(South Korea) Ki Won Bin	TKO
(Japan) Jinnosuke Kashimura	1
(Indonesia) Jeka Saragih	KO
(India) Pawan Maan Singh	3
(India) Anshul Jubli*	BYE
(Japan) Patrick Sho Usami	–
(South Korea) Kim Kyung Pyo	KO
(China) Asikeerbai Jinensibieke	1

Semi-finals
(South Korea) Ki Won Bin	1
(Indonesia) Jeka Saragih	KO
(India) Anshul Jubli	SD
(South Korea) Kim Kyung Pyo	3

Final
(Indonesia) Jeka Saragih	2
(India) Anshul Jubli	TKO

* Patrick Sho Usami suffered weight cut issues the day of weigh ins and no replacement was found.

== See also ==
- Ultimate Fighting Championship
- Road to UFC
