= Diego Lopes (fighter) =

Brazilian mixed martial artist (born 1994)

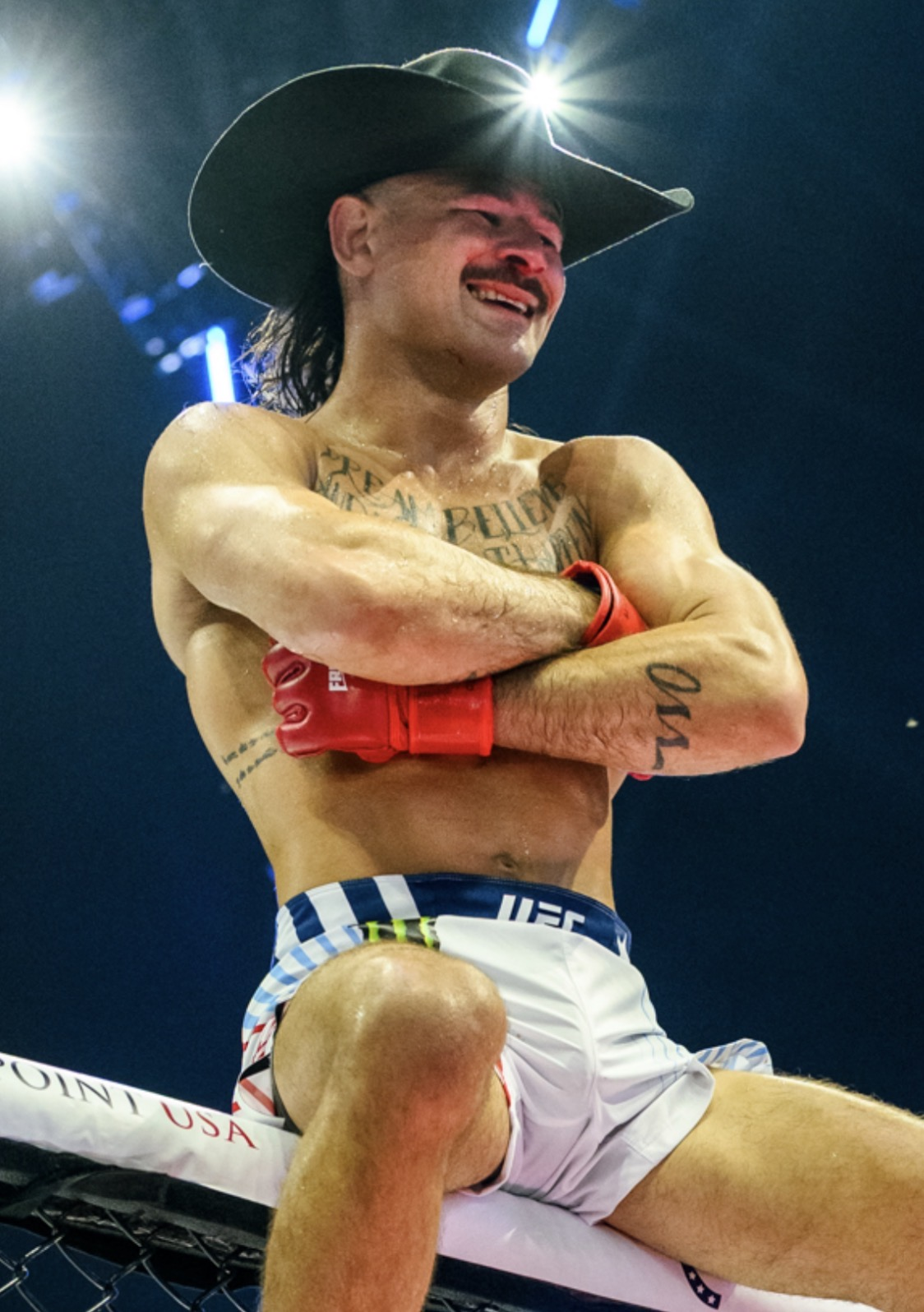
- Lopes in 2026
- Born: Diego Lopes da Silva; 30 December 1994 (age 31); Manaus, Amazonas, Brazil
- Height: 5 ft 11 in (180 cm)
- Weight: 145 lb (66 kg; 10 st 5 lb)
- Division: Featherweight (2012–2014, 2016–present); Bantamweight (2015, 2018)
- Reach: 72 in (183 cm)
- Stance: Orthodox
- Fighting out of: Puebla, Mexico
- Team: Lobo Gym MMA; Brazilian Warriors
- Trainer: Francisco Grasso
- Rank: 2nd degree black belt in Brazilian Jiu-Jitsu
- Years active: 2012–present

Mixed martial arts record
- Total: 36
- Wins: 28
- By knockout: 12
- By submission: 12
- By decision: 4
- Losses: 8
- By knockout: 2
- By decision: 6

Other information
- Mixed martial arts record from Sherdog

Diego Lopes da Silva (born 30 December 1994) is a Brazilian professional mixed martial artist who currently competes in the Featherweight division of the Ultimate Fighting Championship (UFC). A professional since 2012, Lopes formerly competed in the Mexican MMA promotion LUX Fight League, where he was a former LUX Featherweight Champion. As of 15 July 2026, he is #2 in the Meta UFC featherweight rankings.

== Background ==
Born and raised in Manaus, Amazonas, Brazil, Lopes began training Brazilian jiu-jitsu at a young age, as it was a tradition in his family to fight. He quickly began competing at the age of 7. At 16 he received his purple belt and soon transitioned into MMA.

== Mixed martial arts career ==
=== Early career ===
Lopes began his professional MMA career in September 2012 in his home country of Brazil, making an immediate impact with a victory in his debut fight. Over the course of his next seven bouts, Lopes built a solid record of five wins and two losses, showcasing his potential as a rising talent in the sport.

At just 19, Lopes' career took a pivotal turn when his jiu-jitsu instructor offered him an opportunity to teach in Mexico. Seizing the chance to further his training and career, Lopes relocated to Mexico and began teaching Brazilian jiu-jitsu while refining his own skills. This move proved to be a crucial development, not only in his fighting career but also in his life, as it allowed him to continue evolving as both a fighter and a coach.

After establishing himself in Mexico, Lopes resumed his fighting career, determined to rise through the ranks and solidify his place in the competitive world of mixed martial arts.

=== LUX Fight League ===
Lopes debuted in the LUX Fight League promotion on 5 October 2018, facing Luis Guerrero at the LUX 003 event. He won the fight via first-round submission.

After two more unanimous decision wins over Rony Jason and Alejandro Solano Rodríguez, Lopes had the opportunity to face then-featherweight champion Marco Beltrán. The fight took place on 29 November 2019, at LUX 007, where Lopes dethroned Beltrán's reign after defeating him via kneebar submission in the first round.

On 12 March 2021, he made his first and only title defence against Masio Fullen at LUX 012. He won the fight via submission after applying an armbar.

=== Dana White's Contender Series ===
After competing in LUX, Lopes was invited to face Joanderson Brito at Dana White's Contender Series 37 on 31 August 2021. He lost the bout via technical decision after an eye poke in the final round. Although he did not receive a contract on the night, Lopes was eventually signed by the UFC.

=== Ultimate Fighting Championship ===
Making his UFC debut on five days' notice, Lopes faced Movsar Evloev on 6 May 2023 at UFC 288, replacing Bryce Mitchell. He lost the bout via unanimous decision. This fight earned him the Fight of the Night award.

Lopes faced Gavin Tucker on 5 August 2023 at UFC on ESPN 50. He won the bout via armbar in the first round. This victory earned him his first Performance of the Night award.

Lopes faced Pat Sabatini on 11 November 2023 at UFC 295. He won the bout by TKO in the first round. This victory earned him his second Performance of the Night award.

Lopes faced Sodiq Yusuff on 13 April 2024 at UFC 300. After landing two knockdowns, Lopes won by technical knockout in the second minute of the first round. Based on jumping the cage after winning the fight, the NAC withheld $5,000 of his $100,000 payout. On 31 May 2024, NAC decided to fine Lopes $2,500 and $157.04 legal fees instead. NAC executive director Jeff Mullen indicated UFC CEO Dana White would pay Lopes’ fine since Lopes asked White permission to jump over the fence.

Lopes was scheduled to face Brian Ortega in a lightweight bout on 29 June 2024, at UFC 303. The bout was originally scheduled for featherweight, but was changed a day before weigh-ins due to weight cutting issues from Ortega. Subsequently, the day of the event, Ortega withdrew from the fight due to illness, and was replaced on a few hours notice by Dan Ige, at a catchweight of 165 pounds. Lopes won the bout against Ige by unanimous decision.

The bout with Brian Ortega was rebooked and eventually took place on 14 September 2024 at UFC 306. Lopes won the fight by unanimous decision.

Lopes served as the backup and potential replacement for the UFC Featherweight Championship bout between champion Ilia Topuria and former champion Max Holloway on 26 October 2024 at UFC 308.

Lopes was reportedly scheduled to face Yair Rodríguez on 29 March 2025, at UFC on ESPN 64. However, Lopes later denied the fight was ever scheduled.

Lopes competed for the vacant UFC Featherweight Championship against former champion Alexander Volkanovski in the main event on 12 April 2025 at UFC 314. He lost the fight by unanimous decision. This fight earned him another Fight of the Night award.

Lopes faced Jean Silva in the main event on 13 September 2025 at UFC Fight Night 259. He won the fight by technical knockout with a spinning elbow and punches to follow in the second round. This fight earned him a Performance of the Night and Fight of the Night award totaling $100,000.

Lopes competed for the UFC Featherweight Championship in a rematch against champion Alexander Volkanovski in the main event on 1 February 2026 at UFC 325. He lost the fight by unanimous decision. This fight earned him a $100,000 Fight of the Night award.

Lopes faced Steve Garcia on 14 June 2026 at UFC Freedom 250. He won the fight via knockout in the second round.

Moving to lightweight, Lopes is scheduled to challenge for the "BMF Championship" against title holder and former lightweight champion Charles Oliveira on December 12, 2026 at UFC 335.

== Championships and accomplishments ==
=== Mixed martial arts ===
- Ultimate Fighting Championship
  - Fight of the Night (Four times) vs. Movsar Evloev, Alexander Volkanovski (x2) and Jean Silva
  - Performance of the Night (Three times) vs. Gavin Tucker, Pat Sabatini and Jean Silva
    - Sixth most Post-Fight bonuses in UFC Featherweight division history (7)
  - UFC Honors Awards
    - 2025: President's Choice Fight of the Year Nominee vs. Jean Silva
  - UFC.com Awards
    - 2023: Newcomer of the Year & Ranked #8 Submission of the Year vs. Gavin Tucker
    - 2024: Ranked #4 Fighter of the Year
- LUX Fight League
  - LUX Featherweight Championship (one time)
- Jasaji Fighting League
  - JFL Featherweight Championship (one time)
- Xtreme Fighters Latino
  - XFL Featherweight Championship (one time)
- World MMA Awards
  - 2024 Submission of the Year vs. Gavin Tucker at UFC on ESPN: Sandhagen vs. Font
- ESPN
  - 2024 Breakout Fighter of the Year
- MMA Junkie
  - 2023 Newcomer of the Year
- Cageside Press
  - 2023 Newcomer of the Year
- MMA Fighting
  - 2023 First Team MMA All-Star
  - 2024 Second Team MMA All-Star
- BodySlam.net
  - 2024 Breakout Fighter of the Year
- MMA Mania
  - 2025 #2 Ranked Fight of the Year vs. Jean Silva at UFC Fight Night: Lopes vs. Silva

== Personal life ==
Lopes launched a non-profit jiu-jitsu academy for underprivileged children called "Brazilian Warriors" in Puebla, Mexico.

When I first started training, I had nothing. Now that I have support, sponsors and people behind me. I want to give back the things I did not have when I first started..... This program offers support to kids.

As of 2025, he is brand ambassador as part of a multi-year branding deal between the UFC and Spribe.

== Mixed martial arts record ==
Professional record breakdown
36 matches	28 wins	8 losses
By knockout	12	2
By submission	12	0
By decision	4	6

Res.	Record	Opponent	Method	Event	Date	Round	Time	Location	Notes
Win	28–8	Steve Garcia	KO (punches)	UFC Freedom 250	14 June 2026	2	2:42	Washington, D.C., United States	
Loss	27–8	Alexander Volkanovski	Decision (unanimous)	UFC 325	1 February 2026	5	5:00	Sydney, Australia	For the UFC Featherweight Championship. Fight of the Night.
Win	27–7	Jean Silva	TKO (spinning back elbow and punches)	UFC Fight Night: Lopes vs. Silva	13 September 2025	2	4:48	San Antonio, Texas, United States	Performance of the Night. Fight of the Night.
Loss	26–7	Alexander Volkanovski	Decision (unanimous)	UFC 314	12 April 2025	5	5:00	Miami, Florida, United States	For the vacant UFC Featherweight Championship. Fight of the Night.
Win	26–6	Brian Ortega	Decision (unanimous)	UFC 306	14 September 2024	3	5:00	Las Vegas, Nevada, United States	
Win	25–6	Dan Ige	Decision (unanimous)	UFC 303	29 June 2024	3	5:00	Las Vegas, Nevada, United States	Catchweight (165 lb) bout.
Win	24–6	Sodiq Yusuff	TKO (punches)	UFC 300	13 April 2024	1	1:29	Las Vegas, Nevada, United States	
Win	23–6	Pat Sabatini	KO (punches)	UFC 295	11 November 2023	1	1:30	New York City, New York, United States	Performance of the Night.
Win	22–6	Gavin Tucker	Submission (armbar)	UFC on ESPN: Sandhagen vs. Font	5 August 2023	1	1:38	Nashville, Tennessee, United States	Performance of the Night.
Loss	21–6	Movsar Evloev	Decision (unanimous)	UFC 288	6 May 2023	3	5:00	Newark, New Jersey, United States	Fight of the Night.
Win	21–5	Ángel Rodríguez	TKO (punches)	LUX 028	18 November 2022	2	0:40	Monterrey, Mexico	
Win	20–5	Kenn Glenn	KO (punches)	Fury FC 57	11 February 2022	3	4:39	Humble, Texas, United States	
Loss	19–5	Nate Richardson	Decision (split)	Fury FC 52	17 October 2021	5	5:00	Houston, Texas, United States	For the Fury FC Featherweight Championship.
Loss	19–4	Joanderson Brito	Technical Decision (unanimous)	Dana White's Contender Series 37	31 August 2021	3	0:10	Las Vegas, Nevada, United States	Brito was deducted one point in round 3 due to an eye poke which rendered Lopes unable to continue.
Win	19–3	Masio Fullen	Submission (armbar)	LUX 012	12 March 2021	3	3:06	Monterrey, Mexico	Defended the LUX Featherweight Championship.
Win	18–3	Marco Beltrán	Submission (kneebar)	LUX 007	29 November 2019	1	1:35	Monterrey, Mexico	Defended the LUX Featherweight Championship.
Win	17–3	Alejandro Solano Rodríguez	Decision (unanimous)	LUX 006	30 August 2019	5	5:00	Monterrey, Mexico	Won the LUX Featherweight Championship.
Win	16–3	Rony Jason	Decision (unanimous)	LUX 004	15 March 2019	3	5:00	Mexico City, Mexico	
Win	15–3	Luis Guerrero	Submission (armbar)	LUX 003	5 October 2018	1	2:48	Mexico City, Mexico	
Win	14–3	Rogelio Meneses	TKO (punches)	Roca Fighting League 2	17 August 2018	1	3:31	Epazoyucan, Mexico	
Win	13–3	Antonio Hernández	Submission (armbar)	Xtreme Fighters Latino 38	1 June 2018	1	1:21	Mexico City, Mexico	Won the vacant XFL Featherweight Championship.
Loss	12–3	Amir Elzhurkaev	KO (punches)	ACB 78	13 January 2018	2	3:06	Grozny, Russia	Bantamweight bout.
Win	12–2	Issac Ruelas	Submission (rear-naked choke)	Jasaji Fighting League 17	23 September 2017	1	2:23	Mexico City, Mexico	Won the vacant JFL Featherweight Championship.
Win	11–2	Raúl Najera Ocampo	TKO (punches)	Xtreme Fighters Latino 34	21 April 2017	1	3:37	Mexico City, Mexico	
Win	10–2	Carlos Enrique Cañada	Submission (rear-naked choke)	Jasaji Fighting League 15	18 March 2017	1	3:37	Mexico City, Mexico	Catchweight (150 lb) bout.
Win	9–2	Paul Márquez Moreno	Submission (armbar)	Jasaji Fighting League 14	26 November 2016	1	4:46	Mexico City, Mexico	
Win	8–2	Luis Torres	TKO (punches)	Coatza Fight Night 5	16 April 2016	1	1:15	Coatzacoalcos, Mexico	Return to Featherweight.
Win	7–2	Gilberto Pantoja	Submission (triangle choke)	Elite Fight Night 1	19 September 2015	2	2:19	São Paulo, Brazil	
Win	6–2	Duda Sales	Submission (heel hook)	Thunder Fight 3	11 April 2015	1	3:42	São Paulo, Brazil	Bantamweight debut.
Win	5–2	José Roberto dos Santos	TKO (retirement)	MMA Super Heroes 7	15 November 2014	1	2:28	São Paulo, Brazil	Catchweight (132 lb) bout.
Win	4–2	Isaque Silva	Submission (rear-naked choke)	Pro Fight MMA Brazil 11	27 July 2014	2	2:44	São Paulo, Brazil	
Loss	3–2	Rodrigo Praia	TKO (punches)	It's Time Combat 4	16 April 2014	2	N/A	Manaus, Brazil	
Loss	3–1	Thiago Silva	Decision (split)	Big Way Fight 3	8 November 2013	3	5:00	Manaus, Brazil	
Win	3–0	Luiz Silva	Submission (armbar)	It's Time Combat 3	13 July 2013	1	N/A	Manaus, Brazil	
Win	2–0	Raniel da Costa	TKO (punches)	It's Time Combat 2	1 February 2013	2	N/A	Manaus, Brazil	
Win	1–0	Francivaldo Arauvo	TKO (punches)	It's Time Combat 1	8 September 2012	2	N/A	Manaus, Brazil	Featherweight debut.

== Pay-per-view bouts ==
No.	Event	Fight	Date	Venue	City	PPV buys
1.	UFC 314	Volkanovski vs. Lopes	April 12, 2025	Kaseya Center	Miami, Florida, United States	Not disclosed

== See also ==
- List of current UFC fighters
- List of Dana White's Contender Series alumni
- List of male mixed martial artists
