= Dan Ige =

American mixed martial artist (born 1991)

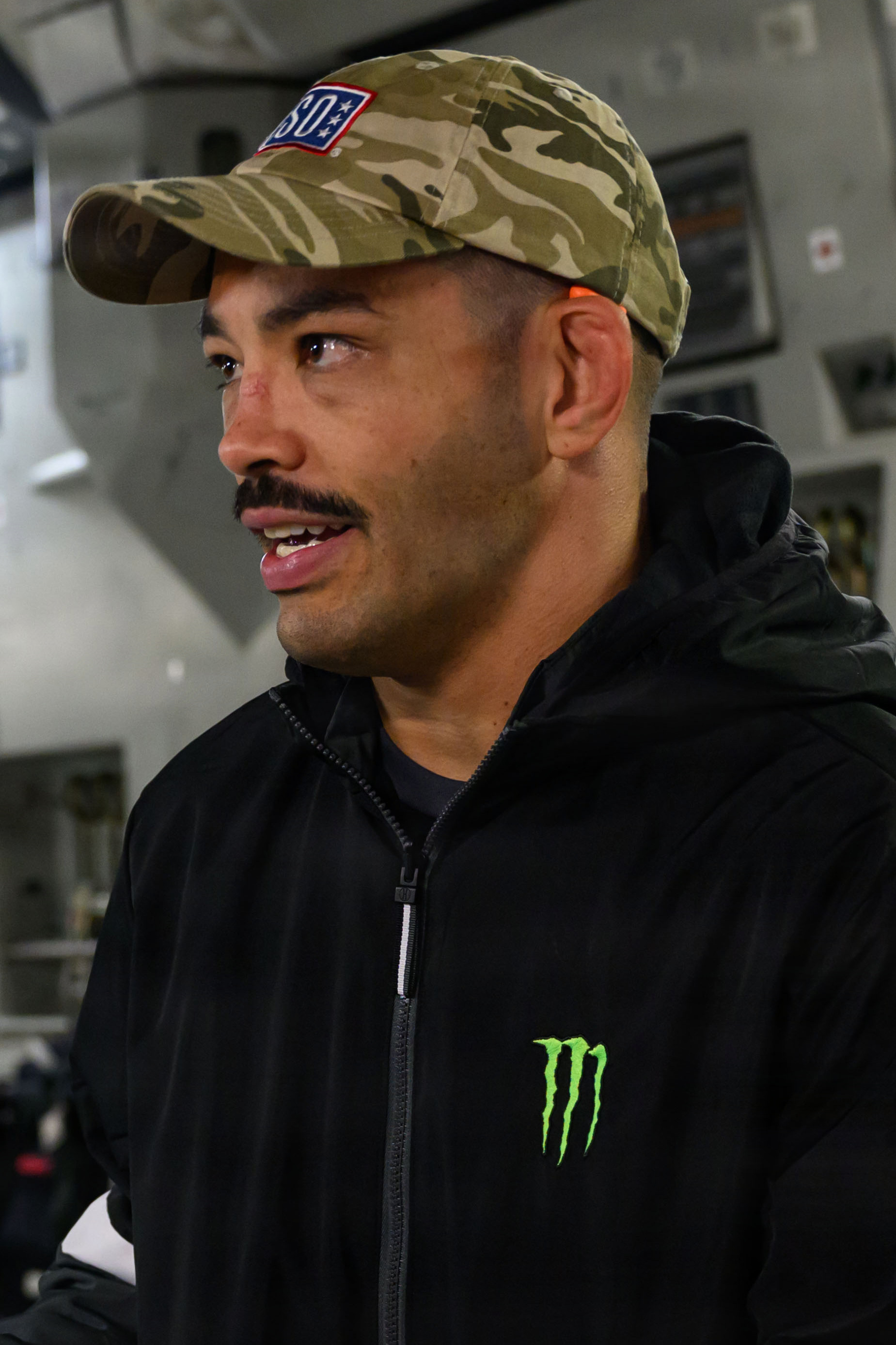
- Ige in 2026
- Born: Daniel Alexander Ige; August 6, 1991 (age 35); Haleiwa, Hawaii, U.S.
- Nickname: 100 Grand
- Height: 5 ft 7 in (1.70 m)
- Weight: 145 lb (66 kg; 10.4 st)
- Division: Featherweight
- Reach: 71 in (180 cm)
- Style: Collegiate Wrestling
- Fighting out of: Las Vegas, Nevada, U.S.
- Team: Xtreme Couture MMA; American Kickboxing Academy
- Rank: Black belt in Brazilian Jiu-Jitsu under Jeff Doner; Brown belt in Judo
- Wrestling: NCAA Division III Wrestling
- Years active: 2014–present

Mixed martial arts record
- Total: 31
- Wins: 19
- By knockout: 7
- By submission: 5
- By decision: 7
- Losses: 12
- By knockout: 1
- By decision: 11

Other information
- Mixed martial arts record from Sherdog

Daniel Alexander Ige (/ˈiːɡeɪ/ EE-gay; born August 6, 1991) is an American professional mixed martial artist who currently competes in the featherweight division of the Ultimate Fighting Championship (UFC). A professional since 2014, he has also competed for the Legacy Fighting Championship, Pancrase, the RFA, and Titan FC.

== Mixed martial arts career ==
Ige started his career out with 10 amateur fights. He compiled an 8–2 record before going pro. He started his pro career with a 2–1 record. He then rattled off six straight victories competing for various regional promotions including a win on Dana White's Contender Series 3.

=== Ultimate Fighting Championship ===
Ige signed with the UFC after earning a victory on Dana White's Contender Series (DWCS). He was expected to face Charles Rosa in his debut at UFC 220. However, Rosa pulled out of the fight citing a neck injury. Ige remained on the card and faced fellow newcomer and DWCS alum Julio Arce. He lost the fight via unanimous decision.

Ige faced Mike Santiago on June 9, 2018, at UFC 225. He won the fight via TKO in the first round.

Ige faced promotional newcomer Jordan Griffin on December 15, 2018, at UFC on Fox 31. He won the fight via unanimous decision.

Ige faced Danny Henry on March 16, 2019, at UFC Fight Night 147. He won the fight via a rear-naked choke submission in the first round. The win also earned Ige his first Performance of the Night bonus award.

Ige faced Kevin Aguilar on June 22, 2019, at UFC Fight Night 154. He won the fight via unanimous decision.

Ige faced Mirsad Bektić on February 8, 2020, at UFC 247. He won the fight via a split decision.

Ige faced Edson Barboza on May 16, 2020, at UFC on ESPN 8. He won the back-and-forth bout via split decision. 16 out of 18 MMA media outlets scored the bout in favor of Barboza.

Ige faced Calvin Kattar on July 16, 2020, at UFC on ESPN 13. He lost the fight via unanimous decision.

Ige was scheduled to face Ryan Hall on March 13, 2021, at UFC Fight Night 187. However, Hall pulled out of the fight on February 11 due to undisclosed reasons. Instead, Ige faced off against Gavin Tucker at UFC Fight Night 187. He won the fight via knockout in the first round. This win earned him the Performance of the Night award.

Ige faced Chan Sung Jung at UFC on ESPN 25 on June 19, 2021. He lost the fight via unanimous decision, getting out-grappled throughout the fight.

Ige faced Josh Emmett on December 11, 2021, at UFC 269. He lost the fight via unanimous decision.

Ige faced Movsar Evloev on June 4, 2022, at UFC Fight Night 207. He lost the fight via unanimous decision.

Ige faced Damon Jackson January 14, 2023, at UFC Fight Night 217. He won the fight via knockout in the second round. This win earned him the Performance of the Night bonus.

Ige faced Nate Landwehr on June 10, 2023, at UFC 289. He won the bout via unanimous decision.

Ige faced Bryce Mitchell on September 23, 2023, at UFC Fight Night 228. He lost the fight via unanimous decision.

Ige was scheduled to face Lerone Murphy on February 10, 2024, at UFC Fight Night 236. However, Murphy pulled out in mid January due to an undisclosed injury, and he was replaced by Andre Fili. Ige won the bout by first-round knockout. This fight earned him another Performance of the Night award.

Ige was scheduled to face Joanderson Brito on July 20, 2024, at UFC on ESPN 60. However, Brito was forced to pull from the event due to a leg injury and was replaced by Chepe Mariscal. However, Ige withdrew from this bout on short notice to serve as a replacement fighter at UFC 303.

Ige, replacing Brian Ortega on a few hours notice, faced Diego Lopes on June 29, 2024, at UFC 303 at a catchweight of 165 pounds. He lost the fight by unanimous decision.

Ige faced Lerone Murphy on October 26, 2024, at UFC 308. He lost the fight by unanimous decision.

Ige faced Sean Woodson on April 12, 2025, at UFC 314. He won the fight by technical knockout in the third round.

Ige faced former Bellator Featherweight and Lightweight Champion Patrício Pitbull on July 19, 2025, at UFC 318. He lost the fight by unanimous decision.

Ige faced Melquizael Costa on February 21, 2026, at UFC Fight Night 267. He lost the fight by technical knockout in the first round via a spinning back kick and punches, marking the first stoppage loss of his career.

Making his bantamweight debut, Ige faced David Martínez on September 12, 2026 at UFC Fight Night 288. He lost the fight by unanimous decision.

== Personal life ==
Ige and his wife Savannah have a son, born in 2021. Ige wrestled collegiately at the NCAA Division III level while attending Wartburg College in Waverly, Iowa.

== Championships and accomplishments ==
=== Mixed martial arts ===
- Ultimate Fighting Championship
  - Performance of the Night (Four times) vs. Danny Henry, Gavin Tucker, Damon Jackson and Andre Fili
  - Tied (Choi Doo-ho) for fifth most knockouts in UFC Featherweight division history (5)
- BodySlam.net
  - 2024 Moment of the Year Fought on just hours notice at UFC 303

== Mixed martial arts record ==
Professional record breakdown
| 31 matches | 19 wins | 12 losses |
| By knockout | 7 | 1 |
| By submission | 5 | 0 |
| By decision | 7 | 11 |

| Res. | Record | Opponent | Method | Event | Date | Round | Time | Location | Notes |
|---|---|---|---|---|---|---|---|---|---|
| Loss | 19–12 | David Martínez | Decision (unanimous) | UFC Fight Night: Silva vs. Delgado | September 12, 2026 | 3 | 5:00 | Glendale, Arizona, United States | Bantamweight debut. |
| Loss | 19–11 | Melquizael Costa | TKO (spinning back kick and punches) | UFC Fight Night: Strickland vs. Hernandez | February 21, 2026 | 1 | 4:56 | Houston, Texas, United States | |
| Loss | 19–10 | Patrício Pitbull | Decision (unanimous) | UFC 318 | July 19, 2025 | 3 | 5:00 | New Orleans, Louisiana, United States | |
| Win | 19–9 | Sean Woodson | TKO (punches) | UFC 314 | April 12, 2025 | 3 | 1:12 | Miami, Florida, United States | |
| Loss | 18–9 | Lerone Murphy | Decision (unanimous) | UFC 308 | October 26, 2024 | 3 | 5:00 | Abu Dhabi, United Arab Emirates | |
| Loss | 18–8 | Diego Lopes | Decision (unanimous) | UFC 303 | June 29, 2024 | 3 | 5:00 | Las Vegas, Nevada, United States | Catchweight (165 lb) bout. |
| Win | 18–7 | Andre Fili | KO (punches) | UFC Fight Night: Hermansson vs. Pyfer | February 10, 2024 | 1 | 2:43 | Las Vegas, Nevada, United States | Performance of the Night. |
| Loss | 17–7 | Bryce Mitchell | Decision (unanimous) | UFC Fight Night: Fiziev vs. Gamrot | September 23, 2023 | 3 | 5:00 | Las Vegas, Nevada, United States | |
| Win | 17–6 | Nate Landwehr | Decision (unanimous) | UFC 289 | June 10, 2023 | 3 | 5:00 | Vancouver, British Columbia, Canada | |
| Win | 16–6 | Damon Jackson | KO (punch) | UFC Fight Night: Strickland vs. Imavov | January 14, 2023 | 2 | 4:13 | Las Vegas, Nevada, United States | Performance of the Night. |
| Loss | 15–6 | Movsar Evloev | Decision (unanimous) | UFC Fight Night: Volkov vs. Rozenstruik | June 4, 2022 | 3 | 5:00 | Las Vegas, Nevada, United States | |
| Loss | 15–5 | Josh Emmett | Decision (unanimous) | UFC 269 | December 11, 2021 | 3 | 5:00 | Las Vegas, Nevada, United States | |
| Loss | 15–4 | Jung Chan-sung | Decision (unanimous) | UFC on ESPN: The Korean Zombie vs. Ige | June 19, 2021 | 5 | 5:00 | Las Vegas, Nevada, United States | |
| Win | 15–3 | Gavin Tucker | KO (punch) | UFC Fight Night: Edwards vs. Muhammad | March 13, 2021 | 1 | 0:22 | Las Vegas, Nevada, United States | Performance of the Night. |
| Loss | 14–3 | Calvin Kattar | Decision (unanimous) | UFC on ESPN: Kattar vs. Ige | July 16, 2020 | 5 | 5:00 | Abu Dhabi, United Arab Emirates | |
| Win | 14–2 | Edson Barboza | Decision (split) | UFC on ESPN: Overeem vs. Harris | May 16, 2020 | 3 | 5:00 | Jacksonville, Florida, United States | |
| Win | 13–2 | Mirsad Bektić | Decision (split) | UFC 247 | February 8, 2020 | 3 | 5:00 | Houston, Texas, United States | |
| Win | 12–2 | Kevin Aguilar | Decision (unanimous) | UFC Fight Night: Moicano vs. The Korean Zombie | June 22, 2019 | 3 | 5:00 | Greenville, South Carolina, United States | |
| Win | 11–2 | Danny Henry | Submission (rear-naked choke) | UFC Fight Night: Till vs. Masvidal | March 16, 2019 | 1 | 1:17 | London, England | Performance of the Night. |
| Win | 10–2 | Jordan Griffin | Decision (unanimous) | UFC on Fox: Lee vs. Iaquinta 2 | December 15, 2018 | 3 | 5:00 | Milwaukee, Wisconsin, United States | |
| Win | 9–2 | Mike Santiago | TKO (punches) | UFC 225 | June 9, 2018 | 1 | 0:50 | Chicago, Illinois, United States | |
| Loss | 8–2 | Julio Arce | Decision (unanimous) | UFC 220 | January 20, 2018 | 3 | 5:00 | Boston, Massachusetts, United States | |
| Win | 8–1 | Luis Gomez | Submission (rear-naked choke) | Dana White's Contender Series 3 | July 25, 2017 | 3 | 3:23 | Las Vegas, Nevada, United States | |
| Win | 7–1 | Ronildo Augusta Brago | Decision (unanimous) | Titan FC 44 | May 19, 2017 | 3 | 5:00 | Pembroke Pines, Florida, United States | |
| Win | 6–1 | Fernando Padilla | Decision (unanimous) | Cage Fury FC 64 | March 25, 2017 | 3 | 5:00 | San Diego, California, United States | |
| Win | 5–1 | Diego Pichilingue | Submission (kimura) | Legacy FC 62 | November 11, 2016 | 2 | 0:52 | Shawnee, Oklahoma, United States | |
| Win | 4–1 | Craig Campbell | TKO (punches) | Legacy FC 57 | July 1, 2016 | 1 | 3:31 | Bossier City, Louisiana, United States | |
| Win | 3–1 | James Jones | TKO (doctor stoppage) | Shogun Fights 14 | April 16, 2016 | 1 | 3:56 | Baltimore, Maryland, United States | Catchweight (150 lb) bout. |
| Loss | 2–1 | Taichi Nakajima | Decision (split) | Pancrase 272 | November 28, 2015 | 3 | 5:00 | Honolulu, Hawaii, United States | |
| Win | 2–0 | Ian Millan | Submission (rear-naked choke) | RFA 23 | February 6, 2015 | 1 | 1:51 | Costa Mesa, California, United States | |
| Win | 1–0 | Spencer Higa | Submission (armbar) | Star Elite Cage Fighting 5 | June 14, 2014 | 3 | 3:07 | Honolulu, Hawaii, United States | |

== See also ==
- List of current UFC fighters
- List of Dana White's Contender Series alumni
- List of male mixed martial artists
