= UFC 314 =

Mixed martial arts event in 2025

UFC 314: Volkanovski vs. Lopes
- The poster for UFC 314: Volkanovski vs. Lopes
- Promotion: Ultimate Fighting Championship
- Date: April 12, 2025
- Venue: Kaseya Center
- City: Miami, Florida, United States
- Attendance: 18,287
- Total gate: $11,507,099

Event chronology
UFC on ESPN: Emmett vs. Murphy	UFC 314: Volkanovski vs. Lopes	UFC on ESPN: Machado Garry vs. Prates

UFC 314: Volkanovski vs. Lopes was a mixed martial arts event produced by the Ultimate Fighting Championship that took place on April 12, 2025, at the Kaseya Center in Miami, Florida, United States.

== Background ==
The event marked the promotion's fourth visit to Miami and first since UFC 299 in March 2024.

A UFC Featherweight Championship bout for the vacant title between former champion Alexander Volkanovski and Diego Lopes headlined the event. Current champion Ilia Topuria vacated the title in order to move up to lightweight.

Former three-time Bellator Lightweight World Champion (also former UFC Lightweight Championship challenger) Michael Chandler and Paddy Pimblett met in a five-round lightweight co-main event.

A UFC Flyweight Championship bout between current champion Alexandre Pantoja and former interim title challenger Kai Kara-France was rumored to take place at this event, but it never materialized.

A welterweight bout between former UFC Welterweight Championship challenger Gilbert Burns and Michael Morales was scheduled for this event. However, the pairing was moved to UFC 315 due to undisclosed reasons.

Former three-time Bellator Featherweight World Champion (also former Bellator Lightweight World Champion) Patrício Pitbull made his promotional debut in a featherweight bout against former interim UFC Featherweight Champion Yair Rodríguez.

Former Ultimate Fighter contestant Bryce Mitchell also fought Jean Silva in a three round featherweight bout. At the time of the contest, Silva was on a twelve fight win streak, including no losses in the UFC.

A women's bantamweight bout between Nora Cornolle and Hailey Cowan was expected to take place at UFC 315. However, the bout was moved to this event for unknown reasons. At the weigh-ins, Cornolle weighed in at 137.5 pounds, one and a half pounds over the bantamweight non-title fight limit. The bout proceeded at catchweight and she was fined 20 percent of her purse which went to Cowan.

A welterweight bout between Geoff Neal and Carlos Prates was scheduled for this event. However, Neal withdrew from the fight due to an injury and the bout was subsequently cancelled.

A featherweight bout between Roberto Romero and promotional newcomer Alberto Montes was scheduled for this event. However, Montes withdrew from the fight for unknown reasons and Romero was moved to UFC on ESPN: Machado Garry vs. Prates two weeks later.

During the event's broadcast, former two-time UFC Women's Bantamweight and one-time Women's Featherweight Champion Amanda Nunes was announced as the next "modern wing" UFC Hall of Fame inductee during International Fight Week festivities in Las Vegas in June.

== Results ==
Main card
Weight class				Method	Round	Time	Notes
Featherweight	Alexander Volkanovski	def.	Diego Lopes	Decision (unanimous) (48–47, 49–46, 49–46)	5	5:00	(Note: For the vacant UFC Featherweight Championship.)
Lightweight	Paddy Pimblett	def.	Michael Chandler	TKO (elbows and punches)	3	3:07
Featherweight	Yair Rodríguez	def.	Patrício Pitbull	Decision (unanimous) (30–27, 30–27, 30–27)	3	5:00
Featherweight	Jean Silva	def.	Bryce Mitchell	Submission (ninja choke)	2	3:52
Light Heavyweight	Dominick Reyes	def.	Nikita Krylov	KO (punch)	1	2:24
Preliminary card (ESPN / ESPN+ / Disney+)
Featherweight	Dan Ige	def.	Sean Woodson	TKO (punches)	3	1:12
Women's Strawweight	Virna Jandiroba	def.	Yan Xiaonan	Decision (unanimous) (30–27, 30–27, 30–27)	3	5:00
Lightweight	Chase Hooper	def.	Jim Miller	Decision (unanimous) (30–27, 29–28, 29–28)	3	5:00
Featherweight	Julian Erosa	def.	Darren Elkins	TKO (punches)	1	4:15
Early preliminary card (ESPN+ / Disney+ / UFC Fight Pass)
Middleweight	Michał Oleksiejczuk	def.	Sedriques Dumas	TKO (punches and elbows)	1	2:49
Flyweight	Su Mudaerji	def.	Mitch Raposo	Decision (split) (28–29, 29–28, 29–28)	3	5:00
Middleweight	Marco Tulio	def.	Tresean Gore	TKO (punch)	2	3:16
Catchweight (137.5 lb)	Nora Cornolle	def.	Hailey Cowan	Submission (rear-naked choke)	2	1:52

== Bonus awards ==
The following fighters received $50,000 bonuses.

- Fight of the Night: Alexander Volkanovski vs. Diego Lopes
- Performance of the Night: Paddy Pimblett and Jean Silva

== See also ==
- 2025 in UFC
- List of current UFC fighters
- List of UFC events
