= Jean Silva =

Brazilian mixed martial artist (born 1996)

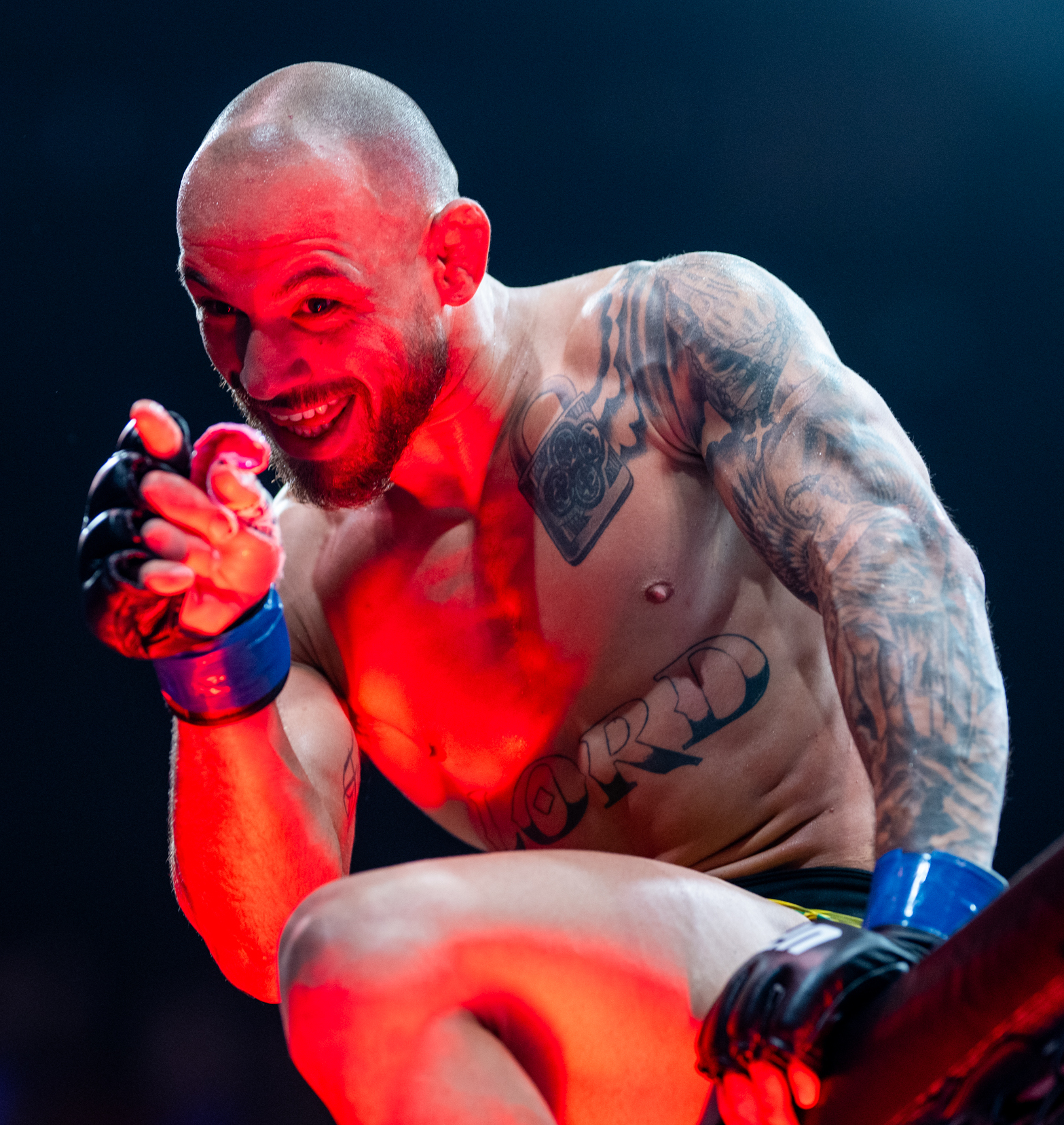
- Silva in 2025
- Born: Jackson Jean da Silva; December 13, 1996 (age 29); Foz do Iguaçu, Paraná, Brazil
- Nickname: Lord
- Height: 5 ft 7 in (170 cm)
- Weight: 145 lb (66 kg; 10 st 5 lb)
- Division: Bantamweight; Featherweight; Lightweight
- Reach: 69 in (175 cm)
- Fighting out of: São Paulo, Brazil
- Team: Fighting Nerds
- Years active: 2016–present

Mixed martial arts record
- Total: 21
- Wins: 18
- By knockout: 12
- By submission: 4
- By decision: 2
- Losses: 3
- By knockout: 1
- By decision: 2

Other information
- Mixed martial arts record from Sherdog

Jackson Jean da Silva (born December 13, 1996) is a Brazilian professional mixed martial artist. He currently competes in the Featherweight division of the Ultimate Fighting Championship (UFC). As of September 12, 2026, he is #5 in the Meta UFC featherweight rankings.

== Background ==
Silva was born on December 13, 1996, in Foz do Iguaçu, Paraná, Brazil. With the support of his wife Carol, Jean found salvation in Muay Thai.

Silva has an alter ego, a distinct identity that, according to him, manifests during his walkout, which he calls "Lord" or "Lord Assassin." He credits his wife for helping to control this alter ego when it appears outside of his career as a fighter.

In 2026, Silva revealed he has been previously diagnosed with autism.

== Mixed martial arts career ==
=== Early career ===
He began his professional career in 2016 and built a record of 10 wins, eight by knockout and two by submission. He lost two matches.

=== Dana White's Contender Series ===
Silva faced Kevin Vallejos for a UFC contract on Dana White's Contender Series: Season 7, Week 5 on September 6, 2023. Silva won the contract by defeating Vallejos with a unanimous decision.

=== Ultimate Fighting Championship ===
Silva made his promotional debut on January 13, 2024, facing Westin Wilson at UFC Fight Night 234. Silva won the fight with a technical knockout in the first round.

Silva was scheduled to face William Gomis on May 4, 2024, at UFC 301. However, the fight was canceled because Gomis suffered a weight cutting-related illness.

Silva then faced Charles Jourdain on June 29, 2024, at UFC 303. At the weigh-in, Silva weighed 147.5 pounds, one and a half pounds over the featherweight limit for non-title fights. The fight proceeded at a catchweight, and Silva was fined 20 percent of his purse, which went to Jourdain. Silva won the fight by knockout in the second round.

Silva, who fought at UFC 303 two weeks earlier, faced Drew Dober on July 13, 2024, at UFC on ESPN 59 in a lightweight bout. Silva won the fight in the third round after Dober was unable to continue due to a cut above his left eye. This fight earned him his first Fight of the Night award.

Silva faced Melsik Baghdasaryan on February 22, 2025 at UFC Fight Night 252. He won the fight by technical knockout in the first round. This fight earned him a Performance of the Night award.

Silva faced Bryce Mitchell on April 12, 2025 at UFC 314. He won the fight via a ninja choke submission in the second round. This fight earned him another Performance of the Night award.

Silva faced former UFC Featherweight Championship challenger Diego Lopes in the main event on September 13, 2025 at UFC Fight Night 259. He lost the fight by technical knockout with a spinning elbow and punches to follow in the second round. This fight earned him another Fight of the Night award.

Silva faced Arnold Allen on January 24, 2026, at UFC 324. He won the fight via unanimous decision.

Silva was scheduled to face Yair Rodríguez in the main event on September 12, 2026 at UFC Fight Night 288. However, Rodríguez withdrew from the fight due to an injury and was replaced by José Miguel Delgado. He won the fight via a rear-naked choke submission in the third round. This fight earned him a $100,000 Performance of the Night award.

== Submission grappling career ==
Silva faced Bryce Mitchell in a submission grappling match at Hype FC Brazil: Rio on March 11, 2026. The bout ended in a draw.

Silva faced Marlon Vera at Hype FC Brazil: Sao Paulo on April 8, 2026. The bout ended in a draw.

== Championships and accomplishments ==
- Ultimate Fighting Championship
  - Fight of the Night (Two times) vs. Drew Dober and Diego Lopes
  - Performance of the Night (Three times) vs. Melsik Baghdasaryan, Bryce Mitchell and Jose Miguel Delgado
  - UFC Honors Awards
    - 2024: Fan's Choice Debut of the Year Nominee vs. Westin Wilson
    - 2025: President's Choice Fight of the Year Nominee vs. Diego Lopes & Fan's Choice Submission of the Year Nominee vs. Bryce Mitchell
  - UFC.com Awards
    - 2024: Ranked #3 Newcomer of the Year
    - 2025: Ranked #2 Submission of the Year vs. Bryce Mitchell
- World MMA Awards
  - July 1, 2024 – December 31, 2025 Submission of the Year vs. Bryce Mitchell at UFC 314
- ESPN
  - 2025 Submission of the Year vs. Bryce Mitchell at UFC 314
- theScore
  - 2025 Submission of the Year vs. Bryce Mitchell
- LowKick MMA
  - 2025 Submission of the Year vs. Bryce Mitchell at UFC 314
- The Wrightway Sports Network
  - 2025 Submission of the Year vs. Bryce Mitchell at UFC 314
- MMA Mania
  - 2025 #2 Ranked Fight of the Year vs. Diego Lopes at UFC Fight Night: Lopes vs. Silva
  - 2025 #4 Ranked Submission of the Year vs. Bryce Mitchell
- MMA Fighting
  - 2025 #3 Ranked Submission of the Year vs. Bryce Mitchell
  - 2025 First Team MMA All-Star
- Cageside Press
  - 2025 Submission of the Year vs. Bryce Mitchell at UFC 314

== Mixed martial arts record ==
Professional record breakdown
21 matches	18 wins	3 losses
By knockout	12	1
By submission	4	0
By decision	2	2

Res.	Record	Opponent	Method	Event	Date	Round	Time	Location	Notes
Win	18–3	José Miguel Delgado	Submission (rear-naked choke)	UFC Fight Night: Silva vs. Delgado	September 12, 2026	3	2:57	Glendale, Arizona, United States	Performance of the Night.
Win	17–3	Arnold Allen	Decision (unanimous)	UFC 324	January 24, 2026	3	5:00	Las Vegas, Nevada, United States	
Loss	16–3	Diego Lopes	TKO (spinning back elbow and punches)	UFC Fight Night: Lopes vs. Silva	September 13, 2025	2	4:48	San Antonio, Texas, United States	Fight of the Night.
Win	16–2	Bryce Mitchell	Submission (ninja choke)	UFC 314	April 12, 2025	2	3:52	Miami, Florida, United States	Performance of the Night.
Win	15–2	Melsik Baghdasaryan	TKO (punches and elbows)	UFC Fight Night: Cejudo vs. Song	February 22, 2025	1	4:15	Seattle, Washington, United States	Performance of the Night.
Win	14–2	Drew Dober	TKO (doctor stoppage)	UFC on ESPN: Namajunas vs. Cortez	July 13, 2024	3	1:28	Denver, Colorado, United States	Lightweight bout. Fight of the Night.
Win	13–2	Charles Jourdain	KO (punch)	UFC 303	June 29, 2024	2	1:22	Las Vegas, Nevada, United States	Catchweight (147.5 lb) bout; Silva missed weight.
Win	12–2	Westin Wilson	TKO (punches)	UFC Fight Night: Ankalaev vs. Walker 2	January 13, 2024	1	4:12	Las Vegas, Nevada, United States	
Win	11–2	Kevin Vallejos	Decision (unanimous)	Dana White's Contender Series 61	September 5, 2023	3	5:00	Las Vegas, Nevada, United States	Return to Featherweight.
Win	10–2	Shahin Najafi	TKO (retirement)	Spartacus MMA 34	March 25, 2023	1	2:15	São Paulo, Brazil	Lightweight debut.
Win	9–2	Valdemir Cardoso	KO (punch)	Spartacus MMA 28	February 4, 2023	1	2:59	São Paulo, Brazil	
Win	8–2	Tiago Souza	Submission (guillotine choke)	Big Shot Fight 1	August 8, 2021	1	0:50	Florianópolis, Brazil	
Win	7–2	Adriano Souza	KO (punch)	Road to Future 1	June 27, 2021	1	4:22	São José do Rio Preto, Brazil	
Win	6–2	Tamyray Lacerda	KO (flying knee)	Cidade da Luta 5	March 8, 2020	1	4:28	Curitiba, Brazil	
Win	5–2	Antonio Henrique Santos de Miranda	Submission (guillotine choke)	MTK MMA Brasil 1	April 27, 2019	1	3:21	Palhoça, Brazil	
Win	4–2	Muniz Martins dos Santos	TKO (punches)	MF Fighters 1	November 10, 2018	1	2:10	São José do Rio Preto, Brazil	
Loss	3–2	Gabriel Schlupp de Lima	Decision (unanimous)	São José Super Fight: Qualifying	April 18, 2018	3	5:00	São José, Brazil	Featherweight debut.
Win	3–1	Lucas Vinicius Razalkiewicz	TKO (doctor stoppage)	Blackout FC 5	December 16, 2017	2	3:43	Balneário Camboriú, Brazil	
Loss	2–1	Pedro Henrique	Decision (split)	Aspera FC 52	May 21, 2017	3	5:00	Blumenau, Brazil	
Win	2–0	Anderson Renan Kraus	TKO (punches)	Aspera FC 50	March 18, 2017	2	3:11	São José, Brazil	Bantamweight debut.
Win	1–0	Lorenzo Rodrigues	KO (punch)	Aspera FC 48	November 19, 2016	1	0:15	São José, Brazil	Catchweight (141 lb) bout.

== See also ==
- List of current UFC fighters
- List of Dana White's Contender Series alumni
- List of male mixed martial artists

Awards
Preceded by Diego Lopes def. Gavin Tucker	World MMA Submission of the Year; July 1, 2024 – December 31, 2025 vs. Bryce Mitchell at UFC 314	Incumbent
