= UFC 303 =

2024 mixed martial event in Nevada, US

UFC 303: Pereira vs. Procházka 2
- The poster for UFC 303: Pereira vs. Procházka 2
- Promotion: Ultimate Fighting Championship
- Date: June 29, 2024
- Venue: T-Mobile Arena
- City: Paradise, Nevada, United States
- Attendance: 18,881
- Total gate: $15,909,243
- Buyrate: 274,000

Event chronology
UFC on ABC: Whittaker vs. Aliskerov	UFC 303: Pereira vs. Procházka 2	UFC on ESPN: Namajunas vs. Cortez

UFC 303: Pereira vs. Procházka 2 was a mixed martial arts event produced by the Ultimate Fighting Championship that took place on June 29, 2024, at the T-Mobile Arena in Paradise, Nevada, part of the Las Vegas Metropolitan Area, United States.

== Background ==
A welterweight bout between former UFC Featherweight and Lightweight Champion Conor McGregor and former three-time Bellator Lightweight World Champion (also a former UFC lightweight title challenger) Michael Chandler was expected to headline the event. The pairing previously coached on The Ultimate Fighter: Team McGregor vs. Team Chandler against each other. However on June 13, it was announced that McGregor was injured and the pairing would be postponed to a future date.

The new headliner for this event was a UFC Light Heavyweight Championship rematch between current champion Alex Pereira (also former UFC Middleweight Champion and former Glory Middleweight and Light Heavyweight Champion) and former champion Jiří Procházka (also the inaugural Rizin Light Heavyweight Champion). They previously met at UFC 295 in November 2023, where Pereira won the vacant title via a second-round TKO.

A light heavyweight bout between former champion Jamahal Hill and Khalil Rountree Jr. was expected to serve as the co-headliner for this event. However, Rountree withdrew from the event after unintentionally ingesting DHEA and contacting Senior Vice President of Anti-doping compliance Jeff Noviztky and UFC Vice President of Anti-doping compliance, Donna Marcolini to inform them of the matter. Rountree was suspended for just two months as it was confirmed he received a tainted supplement. He was replaced by Carlos Ulberg. In turn, Hill pulled out due to injury and was replaced by former title challenger Anthony Smith. Subsequently, for unknown reasons, Ulberg pulled out and was replaced by Roman Dolidze.

A women's strawweight bout between former Invicta FC Atomweight Champion Michelle Waterson-Gomez and Gillian Robertson was scheduled for UFC 302. However, the bout was postponed to this event for unknown reasons.

A flyweight bout between Cody Durden and Carlos Hernandez was scheduled for the event. However, Durden was pulled from the event for unknown reasons and replaced by Road to UFC Season 2 flyweight winner Rei Tsuruya.

A heavyweight bout between former UFC Heavyweight Champion Andrei Arlovski and Martin Buday was expected to take place at UFC Fight Night 242. However, the bout was moved to this event for unknown reasons.

A day before the event, the featherweight co-headliner bout between former UFC Featherweight Championship challenger Brian Ortega and Diego Lopes was changed to a lightweight bout at the request of Ortega, reportedly due to weight-cutting issues. Lopes was already on weight, weighing at 146.5 when he was notified, and as such had to gain back up to 155 before the weigh ins. Subsequently, on the day of the event, Ortega withdrew from the bout due to an illness. He was replaced by Dan Ige just hours before the bout took place at a catchweight of 165 pounds.

At the weigh-ins, Jean Silva weighed in at 147.5 pounds, one and a half pounds over the featherweight non-title fight limit. The bout proceeded at catchweight and Silva was fined 20 percent of his purse which went to his opponent Charles Jourdain.

== Results ==
Main card
Weight class				Method	Round	Time	Notes
Light Heavyweight	Alex Pereira (c)	def.	Jiří Procházka	TKO (head kick and punches)	2	0:13	(Note: For the UFC Light Heavyweight Championship.)
Catchweight (165 lb)	Diego Lopes	def.	Dan Ige	Decision (unanimous) (29–28, 29–28, 29–28)	3	5:00
Light Heavyweight	Roman Dolidze	def.	Anthony Smith	Decision (unanimous) (30–27, 29–28, 29–28)	3	5:00
Women's Bantamweight	Macy Chiasson	def.	Mayra Bueno Silva	TKO (doctor stoppage)	2	1:58
Welterweight	Ian Machado Garry	def.	Michael Page	Decision (unanimous) (29–28, 29–28, 29–28)	3	5:00
Preliminary card (ESPN / ESPN+)
Middleweight	Joe Pyfer	def.	Marc-André Barriault	KO (punches)	1	1:25
Featherweight	Andre Fili	def.	Cub Swanson	Decision (split) (28–29, 29–28, 29–28)	3	5:00
Catchweight (147.5 lb)	Jean Silva	def.	Charles Jourdain	KO (punch)	2	1:22
Bantamweight	Payton Talbott	def.	Yanis Ghemmouri	KO (punches)	1	0:19
Early preliminary card (ESPN / ESPN+ / UFC Fight Pass)
Women's Strawweight	Gillian Robertson	def.	Michelle Waterson-Gomez	Decision (unanimous) (30–27, 30–27, 30–26)	3	5:00
Heavyweight	Martin Buday	def.	Andrei Arlovski	Decision (split) (29–28, 28–29, 30–27)	3	5:00
Flyweight	Rei Tsuruya	def.	Carlos Hernandez	Decision (unanimous) (29–28, 29–28, 29–28)	3	5:00
Bantamweight	Vinicius Oliveira	def.	Ricky Simón	Decision (unanimous) (30–27, 30–27, 29–28)	3	5:00

== Bonus awards ==
The following fighters received $50,000 bonuses.

- Fight of the Night: Andre Fili vs. Cub Swanson
- Performance of the Night: Alex Pereira, Macy Chiasson, Joe Pyfer, and Payton Talbott

== See also ==
- 2024 in UFC
- List of current UFC fighters
- List of UFC events
