= UFC 288 =

UFC mixed martial arts event in 2023

UFC 288: Sterling vs. Cejudo
- The poster for UFC 288: Sterling vs. Cejudo
- Promotion: Ultimate Fighting Championship
- Date: May 6, 2023
- Venue: Prudential Center
- City: Newark, New Jersey, United States
- Attendance: 17,559
- Total gate: $5,182,210.36

Event chronology
UFC on ESPN: Song vs. Simón	UFC 288: Sterling vs. Cejudo	UFC on ABC: Rozenstruik vs. Almeida

UFC 288: Sterling vs. Cejudo was a mixed martial arts event produced by the Ultimate Fighting Championship that took place on May 6, 2023, at the Prudential Center in Newark, New Jersey.

== Background ==
The event marked the promotion's ninth visit to Newark and first since UFC on ESPN: Covington vs. Lawler in August 2019.

A UFC Bantamweight Championship bout between current champion Aljamain Sterling and former UFC Flyweight and Bantamweight Champion Henry Cejudo headlined the event.

Zhalgas Zhumagulov and Nate Maness were expected to meet in a flyweight bout at the event. However, Maness pulled out in early April due to injury and was replaced by Rafael Estevam, who was originally scheduled to fight two weeks earlier at UFC Fight Night: Pavlovich vs. Blaydes before an injury also took his opponent. In turn, the bout was scratched the day before the event due to Estevam having weight management issues.

A featherweight bout between Bryce Mitchell and Jonathan Pearce was scheduled for the event. However, Pearce was forced to withdraw from the event due to injury. He was replaced by Movsar Evloev. Mitchell and Evloev were previously scheduled to headline UFC Fight Night: Rodriguez vs. Lemos in November 2022, but Evloev withdrew due to injury. In turn, Mitchell withdrew on the week of the event for an undisclosed shoulder injury and was replaced by promotional newcomer Diego Lopes.

A lightweight bout between former UFC Lightweight Champion Charles Oliveira and Beneil Dariush was expected to take place as the co-main event. However, Oliveira withdrew due to an undisclosed injury. The fight was later rescheduled and moved to UFC 289.

Former UFC Welterweight Championship challenger Gilbert Burns and Belal Muhammad competed in a five-round welterweight bout in the co-main event.

A bantamweight bout between Daniel Santos and Johnny Muñoz Jr. was expected to take place at the event, but it was scratched after Santos withdrew due to an undisclosed injury.

At the weigh-ins, Joseph Holmes weighed in at 189 pounds, three pounds over the middleweight non-title fight limit. His bout proceeded at catchweight and he was fined 20% of his purse which went to his opponent Claudio Ribeiro.

== Results ==
Main Card
Weight class				Method	Round	Time	Notes
Bantamweight	Aljamain Sterling (c)	def.	Henry Cejudo	Decision (split) (47–48, 48–47, 48–47)	5	5:00	(Note: For the UFC Bantamweight Championship.)
Welterweight	Belal Muhammad	def.	Gilbert Burns	Decision (unanimous) (50–45, 49–46, 49–46)	5	5:00
Women's Strawweight	Yan Xiaonan	def.	Jéssica Andrade	KO (punches)	1	2:20
Featherweight	Movsar Evloev	def.	Diego Lopes	Decision (unanimous) (29–28, 29–28, 30–27)	3	5:00
Featherweight	Charles Jourdain	def.	Kron Gracie	Decision (unanimous) (30–27, 30–27, 30–27)	3	5:00
Preliminary card (ESPN / ESPN+)
Lightweight	Matt Frevola	def.	Drew Dober	TKO (punches)	1	4:08
Light Heavyweight	Kennedy Nzechukwu	def.	Devin Clark	Technical Submission (guillotine choke)	2	2:28
Welterweight	Khaos Williams	def.	Rolando Bedoya	Decision (split) (27–30, 29–28, 29–28)	3	5:00
Women's Strawweight	Virna Jandiroba	def.	Marina Rodriguez	Decision (unanimous) (29–28, 29–28, 30–27)	3	5:00
Early preliminary card (ESPN+ / UFC Fight Pass)
Heavyweight	Parker Porter	def.	Braxton Smith	TKO (punches)	1	2:10
Middleweight	Ikram Aliskerov	def.	Phil Hawes	KO (punches)	1	2:10
Catchweight (189 lb)	Claudio Ribeiro	def.	Joseph Holmes	TKO (punches)	2	3:21

== Bonus awards ==
The following fighters received $50,000 bonuses.

- Fight of the Night: Movsar Evloev vs. Diego Lopes
- Performance of the Night: Yan Xiaonan and Matt Frevola

== Aftermath ==
On June 27, it was announced by United States Anti-Doping Agency (USADA) that Braxton Smith was suspended for two years after a urine sample he submitted tested positive for exogenous administration of testosterone and its precursors in two out-of-competition tests on April 19 and May 4, and one in-competition test May 6.

== See also ==
- List of UFC events
- List of current UFC fighters
- 2023 in UFC
