= Sodiq Yusuff =

Nigerian and American mixed martial artist

- Born: Sodiq Olamide Yusuff; May 19, 1993 (age 33); Lagos, Nigeria
- Other names: Super
- Nationality: Nigerian; American
- Height: 5 ft 9 in (1.75 m)
- Weight: 145 lb (66 kg; 10 st 5 lb)
- Division: Featherweight; Lightweight
- Reach: 71 in (180 cm)
- Fighting out of: Bladensburg, Maryland, U.S.
- Team: Team Lloyd Irvin
- Rank: Blue belt in Brazilian Jiu-Jitsu under Lloyd Irvin
- Years active: 2016–present

Mixed martial arts record
- Total: 18
- Wins: 13
- By knockout: 6
- By submission: 1
- By decision: 6
- Losses: 5
- By knockout: 2
- By decision: 3

Other information
- Mixed martial arts record from Sherdog

Sodiq Olamide Yusuff (born May 19, 1993) is a Nigerian-American professional mixed martial artist who currently competes in the Lightweight division of the Ultimate Fighting Championship (UFC).

== Background ==
Being born in Lagos, Nigeria, his father is from Ibadan while his mother was born in Lagos. He grew up in a polygamist community, with his father having four wives, and the four of them lived together as a unit. Yusuff claims he is one of 16 children in the family, with four siblings with his birth mother. When he was nine years old, his mother took him and his younger brother to the United States. His extended family has never visited the United States and is still living in Nigeria, having a hard time getting visas.

Yusuff attributed his fascination in battle during his formative years to anime, which led to his MMA career.

== Mixed martial arts career ==
=== Early career ===
At Shogun Fights 14, where he made his MMA debut, he defeated Alvin Mercer by second-round TKO. Yusuff won against his next three opponents, including Chuka Willis and John Ramirez. Then, in round one of CFFC 66, he eliminated Vladim Ogar. At Titan FC 47, he competed against Luis Gomez for the Featherweight Championship and was defeated in the opening frame. At Brave CF 10, Yusuff won his lone fight with Brave Combat Federation by first-round TKO over Ireland's Dylan Tuke.

=== Dana White's Tuesday Night Contender Series ===
Yusuff appeared on Dana White's Contender Series 14 on July 24, 2018, facing Mike Davis. He won the fight via unanimous decision. With this win, Yusuff was awarded a contract by the UFC.

=== Ultimate Fighting Championship ===
Yusuff made his UFC debut on December 2, 2018 at UFC Fight Night: dos Santos vs. Tuivasa against Suman Mokhtarian. He won the fight via technical knockout in round one. This win earned him the Performance of the Night award.

Yusuff's second fight came on March 30, 2019 at Philadelphia, facing Sheymon Moraes, at UFC on ESPN 2. He won the fight via unanimous decision.

Yusuff faced Gabriel Benítez on August 17, 2019 at UFC 241. He won the fight via knockout in round one.

Yusuff faced Andre Fili on January 18, 2020 at UFC 246. He won the fight by unanimous decision.

Yusuff was expected to face Edson Barboza on October 11, 2020 at UFC Fight Night 179. However, Yusuff pulled out of the fight on September 22 for undisclosed reasons.

Yusuff faced Arnold Allen on April 10, 2021 at UFC on ABC 2. He lost the fight via unanimous decision.

Yusuff faced Alex Caceres on March 12, 2022 at UFC Fight Night 203. Utilizing leg kicks throughout the bout, Yusuff won the bout via unanimous decision.

Yusuff was scheduled to face Giga Chikadze on September 17, 2022 at UFC Fight Night 210. However, the week before the event, Chikadze withdrew for due to injury and the bout was cancelled.

Yusuff faced Don Shainis on October 1, 2022, at UFC Fight Night 211. He submitted Shainis via guillotine choke 30 seconds into the bout.

After a year-long layoff, Yusuff fought Edson Barboza on October 14, 2023, at UFC Fight Night 230. He lost the fight by unanimous decision. This fight earned his Fight of the Night award.

Yusuff faced Diego Lopes on April 12. 2024 at UFC 300. After being knocked down twice, Yusuff lost by technical knockout in the second minute of the first round.

Yusuff faced Mairon Santos in a lightweight bout on May 17, 2025 at UFC Fight Night 256. He lost the fight by unanimous decision.

== Personal life ==
Yusuff became a U.S. citizen during the training camp for his fight at UFC 246 against Andre Fili.

== Championships and achievements ==
=== Mixed martial arts ===
- Ultimate Fighting Championship
  - Performance of the Night (One time) vs. Suman Mokhtarian
  - Fight of the Night (One time) vs. Edson Barboza
  - UFC.com Awards
    - 2018: Ranked #5 Newcomer of the Year (Tied with Petr Yan)
    - 2023: Ranked #8 Fight of the Year vs. Edson Barboza

== Mixed martial arts record ==
Professional record breakdown
18 matches	13 wins	5 losses
By knockout	6	2
By submission	1	0
By decision	6	3

Res.	Record	Opponent	Method	Event	Date	Round	Time	Location	Notes
Loss	13–5	Mairon Santos	Decision (unanimous)	UFC Fight Night: Burns vs. Morales	May 17, 2025	3	5:00	Las Vegas, Nevada, United States	Return to Lightweight.
Loss	13–4	Diego Lopes	TKO (punches)	UFC 300	April 13, 2024	1	1:29	Las Vegas, Nevada, United States	
Loss	13–3	Edson Barboza	Decision (unanimous)	UFC Fight Night: Yusuff vs. Barboza	October 14, 2023	5	5:00	Las Vegas, Nevada, United States	Fight of the Night.
Win	13–2	Don Shainis	Submission (guillotine choke)	UFC Fight Night: Dern vs. Yan	October 1, 2022	1	0:30	Las Vegas, Nevada, United States	
Win	12–2	Alex Caceres	Decision (unanimous)	UFC Fight Night: Santos vs. Ankalaev	March 12, 2022	3	5:00	Las Vegas, Nevada, United States	
Loss	11–2	Arnold Allen	Decision (unanimous)	UFC on ABC: Vettori vs. Holland	April 10, 2021	3	5:00	Las Vegas, Nevada, United States	
Win	11–1	Andre Fili	Decision (unanimous)	UFC 246	January 18, 2020	3	5:00	Las Vegas, Nevada, United States	
Win	10–1	Gabriel Benítez	TKO (punches)	UFC 241	August 17, 2019	1	4:14	Anaheim, California, United States	
Win	9–1	Sheymon Moraes	Decision (unanimous)	UFC on ESPN: Barboza vs. Gaethje	March 30, 2019	3	5:00	Philadelphia, Pennsylvania, United States	
Win	8–1	Suman Mokhtarian	TKO (punches)	UFC Fight Night: dos Santos vs. Tuivasa	December 2, 2018	1	2:14	Adelaide, Australia	Performance of the Night.
Win	7–1	Mike Davis	Decision (unanimous)	Dana White's Contender Series 14	July 24, 2018	3	5:00	Las Vegas, Nevada, United States	
Win	6–1	Dylan Tuke	TKO (punches)	Brave CF 10	March 2, 2018	1	0:46	Amman, Jordan	
Loss	5–1	Luis Gomez	KO (punches)	Titan FC 47	December 15, 2017	1	4:12	Fort Lauderdale, Florida, United States	For the Titan FC Featherweight Championship.
Win	5–0	Vadim Ogar	KO (punch)	Cage Fury FC 66	August 5, 2017	1	0:30	Atlantic City, New Jersey, United States	Return to Featherweight.
Win	4–0	Chuka Willis	Decision (unanimous)	Victory FC 56	April 14, 2017	3	5:00	Omaha, Nebraska, United States	
Win	3–0	Devin Turner	TKO (punches)	Victory FC 54	September 12, 2016	2	2:25	Omaha, Nebraska, United States	
Win	2–0	John Ramirez	Decision (unanimous)	Victory FC 52	July 16, 2016	3	5:00	Omaha, Nebraska, United States	Lightweight debut.
Win	1–0	Alvin Mercer	TKO (punches)	Shogun Fights 14	April 16, 2016	2	0:22	Baltimore, Maryland, United States	Featherweight debut.

== See also ==
- List of current UFC fighters
- List of Dana White's Contender Series alumni
- List of male mixed martial artists
