= Edson Barboza =

Brazilian and American mixed martial artist (born 1986)

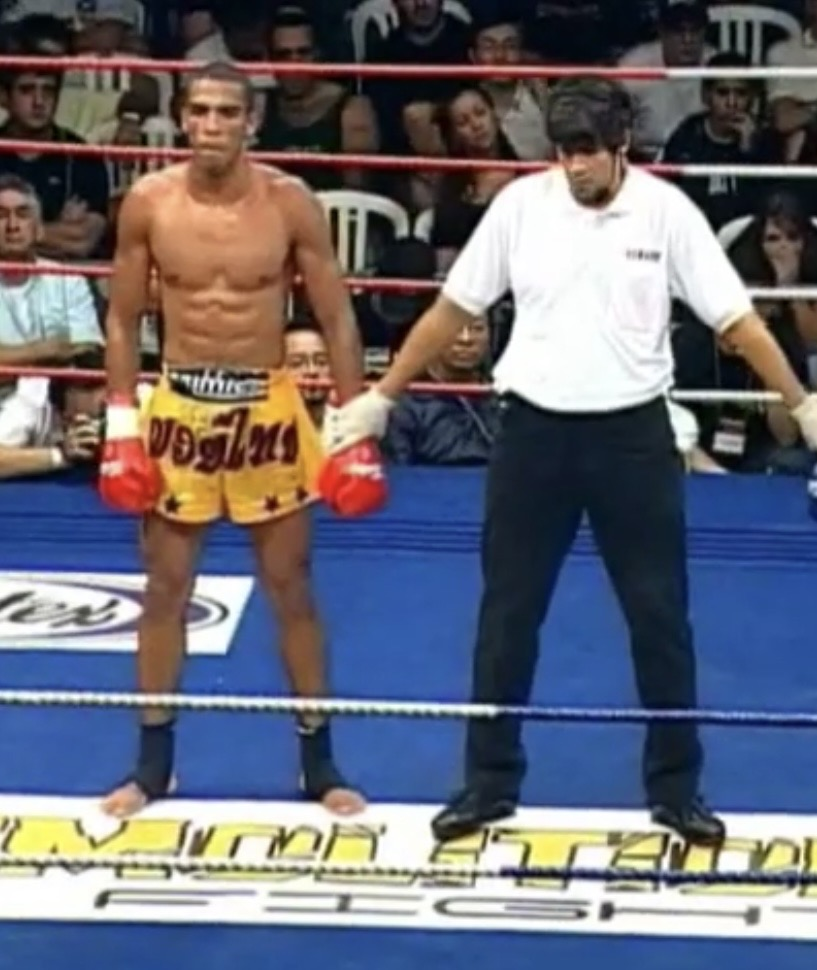
- Barboza on the left
- Born: Edson Mendes Barboza Júnior; January 21, 1986 (age 40); Nova Friburgo, Rio de Janeiro, Brazil
- Nationality: Brazilian; American
- Height: 5 ft 11 in (1.80 m)
- Weight: 155 lb (70 kg; 11.1 st)
- Division: Lightweight (2009–2019, 2025-2026); Featherweight (2020–2024)
- Reach: 75 in (190 cm)
- Fighting out of: Nova Friburgo, Rio de Janeiro, Brazil
- Team: Valor Martial Arts (2009–2012); Ricardo Almeida BJJ; American Top Team
- Trainer: Muay Thai: Anderson França; Boxing: Gabriel Oliveira; Jiu Jitsu: Marcos da Matta; Boxing: Mark Henry (former); Jiu-Jitsu: Ricardo Almeida (former)
- Rank: Black prajied in Muay Thai under Anderson França; Black belt in Taekwondo; Brown belt in Brazilian Jiu-Jitsu under Ricardo Almeida
- Years active: 2009–2026

Kickboxing record
- Total: 28
- Wins: 25
- By knockout: 22
- Losses: 3

Mixed martial arts record
- Total: 39
- Wins: 24
- By knockout: 14
- By submission: 1
- By decision: 9
- Losses: 15
- By knockout: 6
- By submission: 2
- By decision: 7

Other information
- Website: http://www.edsonbarboza.com
- Mixed martial arts record from Sherdog

Edson Mendes Barboza Júnior (born January 21, 1986) is a Brazilian and American former professional mixed martial artist, Muay Thai fighter and kickboxer. He most notably competed in the Featherweight and Lightweight divisions of the Ultimate Fighting Championship (UFC). He is a former Ring of Combat (ROC) and Renaissance MMA Lightweight Champion.

== Mixed martial arts career ==
=== Background ===
Barboza comes from Nova Friburgo, Rio de Janeiro. He was born prematurely at 28 weeks and given a 50/50 chance of surviving past infancy. At the age of 8, he began practicing and competing in Muay Thai. His professional Muay Thai record is 25–3, with 22 victories by knockout and 17 first-round finishes. Barboza moved to the United States in January 2009.

Barboza's professional MMA career began in April 2009 in Tampa, Florida, with a victory over Aaron Steadman via TKO in the first round. In his next fight, in the Renaissance MMA promotion, Barboza defeated Lee King via second-round KO, winning the lightweight title. Barboza defended the belt, also against King, later that year, winning via submission in the first round.

=== Ring of Combat ===
Barboza went on to join New Jersey–based promotion Ring of Combat, making his promotional debut at Ring of Combat 28 against Nabih Barakat. He won the fight via KO just over a minute into the first round.

After a second successful title defense in Renaissance MMA, Barboza challenged for the Ring of Combat lightweight belt against Marcelo Guidici. He won the fight via TKO due to leg kicks in the first round.

Barboza's first title defense was originally scheduled for Ring of Combat 31, against Mikhail Malyutin, but, due to his signing with the UFC, he was replaced by Luiz Azeredo.

=== Ultimate Fighting Championship ===
==== 2010 ====
Barboza was expected to make his UFC debut against Darren Elkins on November 20, 2010, at UFC 123. However, Elkins was forced from the card with an injury and replaced by newcomer Mike Lullo. Shortly into the third round, Barboza defeated Lullo by TKO due to leg kicks (for the first time in UFC history).

==== 2011 ====
Barboza faced Anthony Njokuani on March 19, 2011, at UFC 128, winning by unanimous decision. Both fighters earned Fight of the Night honors.

Barboza defeated Ross Pearson at UFC 134 via split decision. Both fighters earned Fight of the Night bonus honors.

==== 2012 ====
Barboza faced Terry Etim on January 14, 2012, at UFC 142. He defeated Etim by KO in the third round, becoming the first fighter in UFC history to finish an opponent via wheel kick. The win earned Barboza his first Knockout of the Night and Fight of the Night bonus awards

Barboza was expected to face Evan Dunham on May 26, 2012, at UFC 146, but Dunham dropped out of the bout due to injury and was replaced by returning veteran Jamie Varner. Barboza suffered his first professional MMA loss via Knockout in the first round.

==== 2013 ====
Barboza was expected to face Justin Salas on January 19, 2013, at UFC on FX 7. However, Salas was forced out of the bout with an injury and replaced by promotional newcomer Lucas Martins. Barboza defeated Martins via TKO at 2:38 of the first round.

Barboza was scheduled to face John Makdessi on July 6, 2013, at UFC 162, but an injury forced Makdessi off the card and he was replaced by Rafaello Oliveira. Barboza won the fight by TKO due to leg kicks in the second round.

Barboza faced Danny Castillo on December 14, 2013, at UFC on Fox 9. After a dominant first round by Castillo, in which he nearly finished Barboza via strikes and then with a submission attempt, Barboza rallied back and won by majority decision. Both fighters earned Fight of the Night honors.

==== 2014 ====
Barboza faced Donald Cerrone on April 19, 2014, at UFC on Fox 11. Despite finding early success with his striking, Barboza was knocked down by a jab and lost via submission at 3:15 of the first round.

Barboza faced Evan Dunham on July 16, 2014, at UFC Fight Night 45. He won the fight via TKO in the first round.

Barboza faced Bobby Green on November 22, 2014, at UFC Fight Night 57. He won the fight via unanimous decision.

==== 2015 ====
Barboza faced Michael Johnson on February 22, 2015, at UFC Fight Night 61. He lost the fight by unanimous decision.

Barboza was expected to face Myles Jury on July 25, 2015, at UFC on Fox 16, replacing an injured Anthony Pettis. However, Jury himself had to pull out due to injury and was subsequently replaced by undefeated Paul Felder. Barboza won the fight via unanimous decision and earned his fifth Fight of the Night bonus award. UFC President Dana White gave Barboza and Felder high praise afterwards, calling the fight "incredible."

Barboza faced Tony Ferguson on December 11, 2015, at The Ultimate Fighter 22 Finale, replacing an injured Khabib Nurmagomedov. After a back-and-forth first round that saw Ferguson docked one point due to an illegal upkick, Barboza lost the fight via submission in the second round. Both fighters earned Fight of the Night honors.

==== 2016 ====
After the loss to Ferguson, Barboza decided to move to New Jersey to train at Mark Henry's and Ricardo Almeida's MMA team. Barboza faced Anthony Pettis on April 23, 2016, at UFC 197. He won via unanimous decision.

Barboza faced Gilbert Melendez on July 23, 2016, at UFC on Fox 20. He won via unanimous decision.

==== 2017 ====
Barboza faced Beneil Dariush on March 11, 2017, at UFC Fight Night 106. He won the fight via knockout due to a flying knee in the second round. Subsequently, he earned his first Performance of the Night bonus award.

Barboza faced Khabib Nurmagomedov on December 30, 2017, at UFC 219. He lost the fight by unanimous decision.

==== 2018 ====
Barboza faced Kevin Lee on April 21, 2018, at UFC Fight Night 128. At the weigh-ins, Lee weighed 157 pounds, one pound over the lightweight non-title fight upper limit of 156 pounds. Subsequently, the bout proceeded at catchweight, and Lee forfeited 20% of his purse to Barboza. Barboza managed to connect with a spinning back kick and hurt Lee, but went onto lose via TKO due to doctor stoppage in round five.

After losing two consecutive fights, Barboza decided to return to Florida and American Top Team.

Barboza faced Dan Hooker on December 15, 2018, at UFC on Fox 31. He won the fight via TKO in round three.

==== 2019 ====
Barboza faced Justin Gaethje on March 30, 2019, at UFC on ESPN 2. He lost the fight via knockout in round one. This fight earned him the Fight of the Night award.

Barboza faced Paul Felder in a rematch on September 7, 2019, at UFC 242. He lost the fight by a controversial split decision. 13 out of 16 MMA media outlets scored the bout in favor of Barboza, and subsequently the decision was appealed to be overturned. UFC, working in lieu of an athletic commission, denied the appeal.

==== 2020 ====
On December 31, 2019, Barboza announced his intent to move down to the featherweight division. He was expected to face Josh Emmett in a featherweight bout on May 2, 2020, at UFC Fight Night: Hermansson vs. Weidman. However, on April 9, Dana White announced that the event had been postponed. Instead Barboza faced Dan Ige on May 16, 2020, at UFC on ESPN: Overeem vs. Harris. He lost the bout by another controversial split decision. 16 out of 18 MMA media outlets scored the bout in favor of Barboza.

Barboza was expected to face Sodiq Yusuff on October 11, 2020, at UFC Fight Night 179. However, Yusuff pulled out of the fight on September 22 for undisclosed reasons, and was replaced by Makwan Amirkhani. He won the fight via unanimous decision.

==== 2021 ====
On February 25, 2021 news surfaced that Barboza had signed a new multi-fight contract with the organization albeit having one fight left on his prevailing contract. In May, Barboza revealed that the contract was signed for six fights.

Barboza faced Shane Burgos on May 15, 2021, at UFC 262. He won the fight via knockout in the third round after Burgos experienced a delayed reaction to being knocked out with a right cross. This fight earned Barboza the $75,000 Fight of the Night bonus award.

Barboza faced Giga Chikadze on August 28, 2021, at UFC on ESPN 30. After a back-and-forth affair, Barboza lost the fight via TKO in round three.

==== 2022 ====
Barboza faced Bryce Mitchell on March 5, 2022, at UFC 272. He lost the fight via unanimous decision.

Barboza was scheduled to face Ilia Topuria on October 29, 2022, at UFC Fight Night 213. However, Barboza withdrew in late September due to a knee injury

==== 2023 ====
Barboza faced Billy Quarantillo on April 15, 2023, at UFC on ESPN 44. He won the fight via knockout in the first round. This win earned him his second Performance of the Night award.

Barboza faced Sodiq Yusuff on October 14, 2023, at UFC Fight Night 230. After nearly being finished with punches in the first round, Barboza rallied and won the fight by unanimous decision. This performance earned him his ninth Fight of the Night award.

==== 2024 ====
Barboza faced Lerone Murphy on May 18, 2024, at UFC Fight Night 241. He lost the fight by unanimous decision. This performance earned him his tenth Fight of the Night award.

==== 2025 ====
Barboza was scheduled to face Steve Garcia on February 22, 2025, at UFC Fight Night 252. However, Barboza withdrew from the fight due to an injury and the fight was scrapped.

Barboza faced Drakkar Klose in a lightweight bout on August 16, 2025 at UFC 319. He lost the fight via unanimous decision.

Barboza faced Jalin Turner on December 6, 2025 at UFC 323. He lost the fight by technical knockout in the first round.

==== 2026 ====
Barboza faced Esteban Ribovics on August 15, 2026 at UFC 330. He lost the fight by technical knockout in the second round and announced his retirement from MMA in his post-fight interview.

== Submission grappling career ==
Barboza stepped in on short notice to face Sharabutdin Magomedov in a submission-only grappling match at Hype Fighting: Brazil on March 11, 2026.

== Fighting style ==
Described as a "dyed-in-the-wool striker," Barboza is known for his dangerous kicking game. UFC color commentator Joe Rogan has stated that Barboza is "probably the best kicker in MMA." He scored the first wheel kick knockout in UFC history, and is one of three fighters to finish multiple UFC bouts via leg kicks (the other two being Antoni Hardonk and Jonathan Martinez). Barboza is also known for his effective use of switch kicks, which have been labeled "exceptionally quick" and "ferocious". He is the only fighter in the UFC to achieve finishes via head, body and leg kick.

== Personal life ==
Barboza and his wife, Bruna, have a son and a daughter. He has lived and trained in the United States for several years, primarily in New Jersey. He became an American citizen in 2022.

== Championships and accomplishments ==
=== Kickboxing ===
- 2007 Demolition Fight Grand Prix Winner

=== Mixed martial arts ===
- Ultimate Fighting Championship
  - Fight of the Night (Ten times) vs. Anthony Njokuani, Ross Pearson, Terry Etim, Danny Castillo, Paul Felder 1, Tony Ferguson, Justin Gaethje, Shane Burgos, Sodiq Yusuff and Lerone Murphy
    - Tied (Dustin Poirier) for second most Fight of the Night bonuses in UFC history (10)
  - Performance of the Night (Two times) vs. Beneil Dariush & Billy Quarantillo
  - Knockout of the Night (One time) vs. Terry Etim
  - Tied (Melvin Guillard & Justin Gaethje) for third most knockouts in UFC Lightweight division history (7)
  - Tied (Marlon Vera) for fourth most knockdowns in UFC history (16)
    - Tied (Drew Dober & Justin Gaethje) for fifth most knockdowns in UFC Lightweight division history (10)
  - UFC Honors Awards
    - 2019: President's Choice Fight of the Year Nominee vs. Justin Gaethje
    - 2023: Fan's Choice Comeback of the Year Winner vs. Sodiq Yusuff
  - UFC.com Awards
    - 2011: Ranked #10 Fight of the Year vs. Anthony Njokuani
    - 2012: Knockout of the Year vs. Terry Etim
    - 2015: Ranked #3 Fight of the Year vs. Tony Ferguson & Ranked #8 Fight of the Year vs. Paul Felder 1
    - 2017: Ranked #3 Knockout of the Year vs. Beneil Dariush
    - 2019: Ranked #7 Fight of the Year vs. Justin Gaethje
    - 2021: Ranked #6 Fight of the Year vs. Shane Burgos
    - 2023: Ranked #8 Knockout of the Year vs. Billy Quarantillo & Ranked #8 Fight of the Year vs. Sodiq Yusuff
- Renaissance MMA
  - Renaissance MMA Lightweight Championship (One time)
  - Two successful title defenses
- Ring of Combat
  - Ring of Combat Lightweight Championship (One time)
- ESPY Award
  - Best Play ESPY Award – Nomination (2012)
- World MMA Awards
  - 2012 Knockout of the Year vs. Terry Etim at UFC 142
- New York Post
  - 2023 Rally of the Year vs. Sodiq Yusuff at UFC Fight Night: Yusuff vs. Barboza
- Inside MMA
  - Bazzie Award for KO Kick of the Year (2012) vs. Terry Etim
- Sherdog
  - 2010 All-Violence Third Team
  - 2012 Knockout of the Year vs. Terry Etim
  - 2017 Knockout of the Year vs. Beneil Dariush
  - 2018 Beatdown of the Year vs. Dan Hooker
- MMA Junkie
  - 2015 #5 Ranked Fight of the Year vs. Tony Ferguson at The Ultimate Fighter: Team McGregor vs. Team Faber Finale
  - 2015 December Fight of the Month vs. Tony Ferguson
  - 2019 September Fight of the Month vs. Paul Felder
- MMA Fighting
  - 2023 Third Team MMA All-Star
- Bloody Elbow
  - 2012 Knockout of the Year vs. Terry Etim at UFC 142
- FIGHT! Magazine
  - 2012 Knockout of the Year vs. Terry Etim at UFC 142

== Mixed martial arts record ==
Professional record breakdown
| 39 matches | 24 wins | 15 losses |
| By knockout | 14 | 6 |
| By submission | 1 | 2 |
| By decision | 9 | 7 |

| Res. | Record | Opponent | Method | Event | Date | Round | Time | Location | Notes |
|---|---|---|---|---|---|---|---|---|---|
| Loss | 24–15 | Esteban Ribovics | TKO (punches) | UFC 330 | August 15, 2026 | 2 | 1:32 | Philadelphia, Pennsylvania, United States | |
| Loss | 24–14 | Jalin Turner | TKO (punches) | UFC 323 | December 6, 2025 | 1 | 2:24 | Las Vegas, Nevada, United States | |
| Loss | 24–13 | Drakkar Klose | Decision (unanimous) | UFC 319 | August 16, 2025 | 3 | 5:00 | Chicago, Illinois, United States | Return to Lightweight. |
| Loss | 24–12 | Lerone Murphy | Decision (unanimous) | UFC Fight Night: Barboza vs. Murphy | May 18, 2024 | 5 | 5:00 | Las Vegas, Nevada, United States | Fight of the Night. |
| Win | 24–11 | Sodiq Yusuff | Decision (unanimous) | UFC Fight Night: Yusuff vs. Barboza | October 14, 2023 | 5 | 5:00 | Las Vegas, Nevada, United States | Fight of the Night. |
| Win | 23–11 | Billy Quarantillo | KO (knee) | UFC on ESPN: Holloway vs. Allen | April 15, 2023 | 1 | 2:37 | Kansas City, Missouri, United States | Performance of the Night. |
| Loss | 22–11 | Bryce Mitchell | Decision (unanimous) | UFC 272 | March 5, 2022 | 3 | 5:00 | Las Vegas, Nevada, United States | |
| Loss | 22–10 | Giga Chikadze | TKO (punches) | UFC on ESPN: Barboza vs. Chikadze | August 28, 2021 | 3 | 1:44 | Las Vegas, Nevada, United States | |
| Win | 22–9 | Shane Burgos | KO (punches) | UFC 262 | May 15, 2021 | 3 | 1:16 | Houston, Texas, United States | Fight of the Night. |
| Win | 21–9 | Makwan Amirkhani | Decision (unanimous) | UFC Fight Night: Moraes vs. Sandhagen | October 11, 2020 | 3 | 5:00 | Abu Dhabi, United Arab Emirates | |
| Loss | 20–9 | Dan Ige | Decision (split) | UFC on ESPN: Overeem vs. Harris | May 16, 2020 | 3 | 5:00 | Jacksonville, Florida, United States | Featherweight debut. |
| Loss | 20–8 | Paul Felder | Decision (split) | UFC 242 | September 7, 2019 | 3 | 5:00 | Abu Dhabi, United Arab Emirates | |
| Loss | 20–7 | Justin Gaethje | KO (punch) | UFC on ESPN: Barboza vs. Gaethje | March 30, 2019 | 1 | 2:30 | Philadelphia, Pennsylvania, United States | Fight of the Night. |
| Win | 20–6 | Dan Hooker | KO (punch to the body) | UFC on Fox: Lee vs. Iaquinta 2 | December 15, 2018 | 3 | 2:19 | Milwaukee, Wisconsin, United States | |
| Loss | 19–6 | Kevin Lee | TKO (doctor stoppage) | UFC Fight Night: Barboza vs. Lee | April 21, 2018 | 5 | 2:18 | Atlantic City, New Jersey, United States | Catchweight (157 lb) bout; Lee missed weight. |
| Loss | 19–5 | Khabib Nurmagomedov | Decision (unanimous) | UFC 219 | December 30, 2017 | 3 | 5:00 | Las Vegas, Nevada, United States | |
| Win | 19–4 | Beneil Dariush | KO (flying knee) | UFC Fight Night: Belfort vs. Gastelum | March 11, 2017 | 2 | 3:35 | Fortaleza, Brazil | Performance of the Night. |
| Win | 18–4 | Gilbert Melendez | Decision (unanimous) | UFC on Fox: Holm vs. Shevchenko | July 23, 2016 | 3 | 5:00 | Chicago, Illinois, United States | |
| Win | 17–4 | Anthony Pettis | Decision (unanimous) | UFC 197 | April 23, 2016 | 3 | 5:00 | Las Vegas, Nevada, United States | |
| Loss | 16–4 | Tony Ferguson | Submission (brabo choke) | The Ultimate Fighter: Team McGregor vs. Team Faber Finale | December 11, 2015 | 2 | 2:54 | Las Vegas, Nevada, United States | Ferguson was deducted one point in round one due to an illegal upkick. Fight of the Night. |
| Win | 16–3 | Paul Felder | Decision (unanimous) | UFC on Fox: Dillashaw vs. Barão 2 | July 25, 2015 | 3 | 5:00 | Chicago, Illinois, United States | Fight of the Night. |
| Loss | 15–3 | Michael Johnson | Decision (unanimous) | UFC Fight Night: Bigfoot vs. Mir | February 22, 2015 | 3 | 5:00 | Porto Alegre, Brazil | |
| Win | 15–2 | Bobby Green | Decision (unanimous) | UFC Fight Night: Edgar vs. Swanson | November 22, 2014 | 3 | 5:00 | Austin, Texas, United States | |
| Win | 14–2 | Evan Dunham | TKO (kick to the body and punches) | UFC Fight Night: Cowboy vs. Miller | July 16, 2014 | 1 | 3:06 | Atlantic City, New Jersey, United States | |
| Loss | 13–2 | Donald Cerrone | Submission (rear-naked choke) | UFC on Fox: Werdum vs. Browne | April 19, 2014 | 1 | 3:15 | Orlando, Florida, United States | |
| Win | 13–1 | Danny Castillo | Decision (majority) | UFC on Fox: Johnson vs. Benavidez 2 | December 14, 2013 | 3 | 5:00 | Sacramento, California, United States | Fight of the Night. |
| Win | 12–1 | Rafaello Oliveira | TKO (leg kicks) | UFC 162 | July 6, 2013 | 2 | 1:44 | Las Vegas, Nevada, United States | |
| Win | 11–1 | Lucas Martins | TKO (punches) | UFC on FX: Belfort vs. Bisping | January 19, 2013 | 1 | 2:38 | São Paulo, Brazil | |
| Loss | 10–1 | Jamie Varner | TKO (punches) | UFC 146 | May 26, 2012 | 1 | 3:23 | Las Vegas, Nevada, United States | |
| Win | 10–0 | Terry Etim | KO (spinning wheel kick) | UFC 142 | January 14, 2012 | 3 | 2:02 | Rio de Janeiro, Brazil | Knockout of the Night. Fight of the Night. Knockout of the Year. |
| Win | 9–0 | Ross Pearson | Decision (split) | UFC 134 | August 27, 2011 | 3 | 5:00 | Rio de Janeiro, Brazil | Fight of the Night. |
| Win | 8–0 | Anthony Njokuani | Decision (unanimous) | UFC 128 | March 19, 2011 | 3 | 5:00 | Newark, New Jersey, United States | Fight of the Night. |
| Win | 7–0 | Mike Lullo | TKO (leg kicks) | UFC 123 | November 20, 2010 | 3 | 0:26 | Auburn Hills, Michigan, United States | |
| Win | 6–0 | Marcelo Guidici | TKO (leg kicks) | Ring of Combat 30 | June 11, 2010 | 1 | 3:01 | Atlantic City, New Jersey, United States | Won the Ring of Combat Lightweight Championship. |
| Win | 5–0 | Jose Figueroa | KO (punch) | Renaissance MMA 16 | March 5, 2010 | 1 | 3:55 | New Orleans, Louisiana, United States | Defended the Renaissance MMA Lightweight Championship. |
| Win | 4–0 | Nabih Barakat | KO (punches) | Ring of Combat 28 | February 19, 2010 | 1 | 1:09 | Atlantic City, New Jersey, United States | |
| Win | 3–0 | Lee King | Submission (anaconda choke) | Renaissance MMA 15 | November 20, 2009 | 1 | 2:04 | New Orleans, Louisiana, United States | Defended the Renaissance MMA Lightweight Championship. |
| Win | 2–0 | Lee King | KO (punches) | Renaissance MMA 12 | June 13, 2009 | 2 | 1:14 | New Orleans, Louisiana, United States | Won the Renaissance MMA Lightweight Championship. |
| Win | 1–0 | Aaron Steadman | TKO (punches) | Real FC 17: Street Kings | April 17, 2009 | 1 | 3:34 | Tampa, Florida, United States | |

== Muay Thai & Kickboxing record ==
Muay Thai & Kickboxing record (incomplete)
25 Wins (22 (T)KO's), 3 Losses
| Date | Result | Opponent | Event | Location | Method | Round | Time |
| 2007-11-10 | Win | (Brazil) Tadeu San Martino | Demolition Fight VI, Final | São Paulo, Brazil | Decision | 3 | 3:00 |
Wins Demolition Fight Grand Prix.
| 2007-11-10 | Win | (Brazil) Marfio Canoletti | Demolition Fight VI, Semi Final | São Paulo, Brazil | KO (Punches) | 1 | 2:46 |
| 2007-11-10 | Win | (Brazil) Marcos Rodrigues | Demolition Fight VI, Quarter Final | São Paulo, Brazil | TKO (Doctor Stoppage) | 1 | 3:00 |
| 2007-03-29 | Loss | (Brazil) Tadeu San Martino | GP la Gara, Final | Brazil | KO (Punches) | 3 | |
| 2006-11-18 | Win | (Brazil) Jair Portilho | Festival de Muay Thai | Rio, Brazil | KO | 2 | |
| 2006-09-23 | Loss | (Brazil) Bruno Carvalho | Demolition Fight IV | São Paulo, Brazil | Decision | 3 | 3:00 |
For the Demolition Fight -70kg title.
| 2005-10-10 | Win | (Brazil) Flavio Pardinho | Demolition Fight II | São Paulo, Brazil | KO | 3 | 1:11 |
| | Loss | (Brazil) Bruno Carvalho | AFC BR I | Brazil | Decision | 5 | 3:00 |
Legend: Win Loss Draw/No contest Notes

== See also ==
- List of male mixed martial artists
