= Movsar Evloev =

Russian mixed martial artist (born 1994)

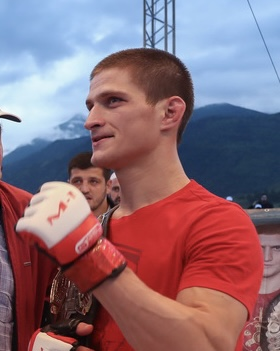
- Evloev in 2018
- Born: Movsar Magomedovich Evloev; February 11, 1994 (age 32); Ordzhonikidzvskaya, Ingushetia, Russia (now Sunzha, Ingushetia, Russia)
- Native name: Мовсар Магомедович Евлоев
- Height: 5 ft 7 in (170 cm)
- Weight: 145 lb (66 kg; 10 st 5 lb)
- Division: Bantamweight (2014, 2016–2019); Featherweight (2015–16, 2019–present)
- Reach: 72 1/2 in (184 cm)
- Fighting out of: Sunzha, Ingushetia, Russia
- Team: Nart Fight Club; American Top Team (2020–present)
- Rank: Master of Sports in Greco-Roman wrestling
- Years active: 2014–present

Mixed martial arts record
- Total: 21
- Wins: 20
- By knockout: 3
- By submission: 4
- By decision: 13
- Losses: 1
- By knockout: 1

Other information
- Notable relatives: Musa Evloev
- Mixed martial arts record from Sherdog

Movsar Magomedovich Evloev (Note: Russian: Мовсар Магомедович Евлоев Ingush: Йовлой Мухьмада Мовсар, romanized: Jovluoj Mux́mada Movsar) (born February 11, 1994) is a Russian professional mixed martial artist. He currently competes in the Featherweight division of the Ultimate Fighting Championship (UFC). A professional since 2014, he has also competed at M-1 Global, where he is the former bantamweight champion. As of July 15, 2025, he is #1 in the Meta UFC featherweight rankings.

== Early life ==
Evloev, who has a degree in computer programming and law, belongs to the Ingush teip Youvloy. Before turning professional in mixed martial arts in 2014, Movsar earned the rank of a Master of Sports in Greco-Roman wrestling. He is the cousin of Olympic gold medalist, Musa Evloev.

== Mixed martial arts career ==
=== M-1 Global ===
Prior to competing in the Ultimate Fighting Championship, Evloev spent all his time in M-1 Global.

On April 22, 2017, Evloev faced Alexey Nevzorov for the M-1 Global Interim Bantamweight championship. He knocked out Nevzorov in the second round to claim the title.

Evloev then faced Pavel Vitruk for the undisputed title on July 22, 2017. He defeated Vitruk by unanimous decision to unify the championship.

Following his championship victory, Evloev's first title defense was held in February 2018, against Sergey Morozov. He defeated him with a rear-naked choke in the third round.

In his next title defense, he faced Rafael Dias on July 21, 2018. He knocked Dias out in the fifth round to retain his belt.

In April, he vacated the championship and signed with the UFC.

=== Ultimate Fighting Championship ===
Evloev was scheduled to make his promotional debut against Muin Gafurov on April 20, 2019, at UFC Fight Night 149. However, Gafurov withdrew and was replaced by Seung Woo Choi. Evloev won the fight by unanimous decision.

Evloev was then scheduled to face Mike Grundy on August 31, 2019, at UFC Fight Night 157. However, Grundy pulled out of the bout due to injury and was then set to be replaced by Zhenhong Lu. However, just hours before the fight, Lu pulled out after suffering a cut.

In his second UFC appearance, Evloev faced Enrique Barzola on October 26, 2019, at UFC Fight Night 162. He won the fight by unanimous decision.

Evloev was then slated to face Douglas Silva de Andrade on March 7, 2020, at UFC 248. However, Andrade pulled out of the fight and was set to be replaced by Jamall Emmers. However, Evloev pulled out of the contest for unknown reasons.

Evloev faced Mike Grundy on July 26, 2020, at UFC on ESPN 14. He won the fight by unanimous decision.

Evloev was scheduled to face Nate Landwehr on December 5, 2020, at UFC on ESPN 19 However, on the day of the fight, the bout was cancelled after Evloev tested positive for COVID-19.

Evloev faced Nik Lentz, replacing Mike Grundy, at UFC 257 on January 24, 2021. He won the fight via split decision. 26 out of 26 media outlets scored the bout for Evloev.

Evloev faced Hakeem Dawodu on June 12, 2021, at UFC 263. He won the fight via unanimous decision.

Evloev was expected to face Ilia Topuria on January 22, 2022, at UFC 270. However, Evloev withdrew from the bout after a positive COVID-19 test and was replaced by Charles Jourdain.

Evloev faced Dan Ige on June 4, 2022, at UFC Fight Night 207. He won the fight via unanimous decision.

As the first bout of his new multi-fight contract, Evloev was scheduled to face Bryce Mitchell on November 5, 2022, at UFC Fight Night 214. However, Evloev withdrew in mid October due to injury.

Evloev was scheduled to face Bryce Mitchell, replacing injured Jonathan Pearce, on May 6, 2023, at UFC 288. However, Mitchell withdrew due to an undisclosed injury. He was replaced by Diego Lopes. Evloev defeated Lopes via unanimous decision. This fight earned him the Fight of the Night award.

Evloev faced Arnold Allen on January 20, 2024, at UFC 297. In a competitive bout, he won once again by unanimous decision.

Evloev was scheduled to face former UFC Bantamweight Champion Aljamain Sterling on October 5, 2024 at UFC 307. However, Sterling withdrew from the fight due to an injury sustained in sparring. The pairing was eventually rescheduled to compete against one another at UFC 310 on December 7, 2024. Evloev won the fight by unanimous decision.

Evloev was reportedly going to face Aaron Pico on May 17, 2025 at UFC Fight Night 256. However, on an interview, Pico revealed that although it was close to being signed, the bout did not come to fruition. The fight was later re-scheduled to take place on July 26, 2025 at UFC on ABC 9. In turn, under two weeks prior to this event, Evloev had to withdraw due to an injury.

Evloev faced fellow undefeated contender Lerone Murphy in a main event title eliminator bout on March 21, 2026, at UFC Fight Night 270. After landing repeated groin strikes that resulted in a point deduction in the fourth round, Evloev went on to win the fight by majority decision. 12 out of 17 media outlets scored the bout as a draw while the remaining five scored it for Murphy.

Evloev challenged for the UFC Featherweight Championship against two-time champion Alexander Volkanovski on October 24, 2026 at UFC 333. Evloev lost the fight by technical knockout in the second round, marking his first loss in mixed martial arts.

== Championships and accomplishments ==
- Ultimate Fighting Championship
  - Fight of the Night (One time) vs. Diego Lopes
  - Highest decision wins per win percentage in UFC history (10 decision wins / 10 wins: 100%)
  - Second most takedowns landed in UFC Featherweight division history (52) (behind Darren Elkins)
  - Tied (Lerone Murphy) for fourth longest win streak in UFC Featherweight division history (9)
  - Tied (Max Holloway, Alexander Volkanovski & Andre Fili) for second most decision wins in UFC Featherweight division history (9)
  - Sixth longest average fight time in UFC Featherweight division history (15:29)
  - First and only fighter to start UFC career with ten straight decision wins
- M-1 Global
  - M-1 Global interim Bantamweight Championship (One time; first)
  - M-1 Global Bantamweight Championship (One time; former)
    - Two successful title defenses

== Mixed martial arts record ==
Professional record breakdown
21 matches	20 wins	1 loss
By knockout	3	1
By submission	4	0
By decision	13	0

Res.	Record	Opponent	Method	Event	Date	Round	Time	Location	Notes
Loss	20–1	Alexander Volkanovski	TKO (punches)	UFC 333	October 24, 2026	2	4:54	Abu Dhabi, United Arab Emirates	For the UFC Featherweight Championship.
Win	20–0	Lerone Murphy	Decision (majority)	UFC Fight Night: Evloev vs. Murphy	March 21, 2026	5	5:00	London, England	UFC Featherweight title eliminator. Evloev was deducted one point in round 4 due to an illegal groin strike.
Win	19–0	Aljamain Sterling	Decision (unanimous)	UFC 310	December 7, 2024	3	5:00	Las Vegas, Nevada, United States	
Win	18–0	Arnold Allen	Decision (unanimous)	UFC 297	January 20, 2024	3	5:00	Toronto, Ontario, Canada	
Win	17–0	Diego Lopes	Decision (unanimous)	UFC 288	May 6, 2023	3	5:00	Newark, New Jersey, United States	Fight of the Night.
Win	16–0	Dan Ige	Decision (unanimous)	UFC Fight Night: Volkov vs. Rozenstruik	June 4, 2022	3	5:00	Las Vegas, Nevada, United States	
Win	15–0	Hakeem Dawodu	Decision (unanimous)	UFC 263	June 12, 2021	3	5:00	Glendale, Arizona, United States	
Win	14–0	Nik Lentz	Decision (split)	UFC 257	January 24, 2021	3	5:00	Abu Dhabi, United Arab Emirates	Catchweight (150 lb) bout.
Win	13–0	Mike Grundy	Decision (unanimous)	UFC on ESPN: Whittaker vs. Till	July 26, 2020	3	5:00	Abu Dhabi, United Arab Emirates	
Win	12–0	Enrique Barzola	Decision (unanimous)	UFC Fight Night: Maia vs. Askren	October 26, 2019	3	5:00	Kallang, Singapore	
Win	11–0	Choi Seung-woo	Decision (unanimous)	UFC Fight Night: Overeem vs. Oleinik	April 20, 2019	3	5:00	Saint Petersburg, Russia	Return to Featherweight. Evloev was deducted one point in round 2 due to an illegal knee.
Win	10–0	Rafael Dias	KO (punches)	M-1 Challenge 95	July 21, 2018	5	0:21	Nazran, Russia	Defended the M-1 Global Bantamweight Championship.
Win	9–0	Sergey Morozov	Submission (rear-naked choke)	M-1 Challenge 88	February 22, 2018	3	3:47	Moscow, Russia	Defended the M-1 Global Bantamweight Championship.
Win	8–0	Pavel Vitruk	Decision (unanimous)	M-1 Challenge 81	July 22, 2017	5	5:00	Nazran, Russia	Won and unified the M-1 Global Bantamweight Championship.
Win	7–0	Alexey Nevzorov	KO (head kick)	M-1 Challenge 76	April 22, 2017	2	2:15	Nalchik, Russia	Won the interim M-1 Global Bantamweight Championship.
Win	6–0	Lee Morrison	Decision (unanimous)	M-1 Challenge 73	December 9, 2016	3	5:00	Nazran, Russia	
Win	5–0	Aleksander Krupenkin	TKO (punches)	M-1 Challenge 66	May 27, 2016	1	4:09	Orenburg, Russia	Return to Bantamweight.
Win	4–0	Djulustan Akimov	Submission (rear-naked choke)	M-1 Global: Battle in Nazran 3	May 7, 2016	2	2:01	Nazran, Russia	
Win	3–0	Andrey Syrovatkin	Submission (rear-naked choke)	M-1 Global: Battle in Nazran 1	December 12, 2015	1	1:44	Nazran, Russia	Featherweight debut.
Win	2–0	Lu Zhenhong	Decision (unanimous)	M-1 Challenge 58	June 6, 2015	2	5:00	Ingushetia, Russia	Catchweight (141 lb) bout.
Win	1–0	He Jianwei	Submission (rear-naked choke)	M-1 Challenge 53	November 25, 2014	2	1:45	Beijing, China	Bantamweight debut.

== See also ==
- List of current UFC fighters
- List of male mixed martial artists
