= Ilia Topuria =

Georgian-Spanish mixed martial artist

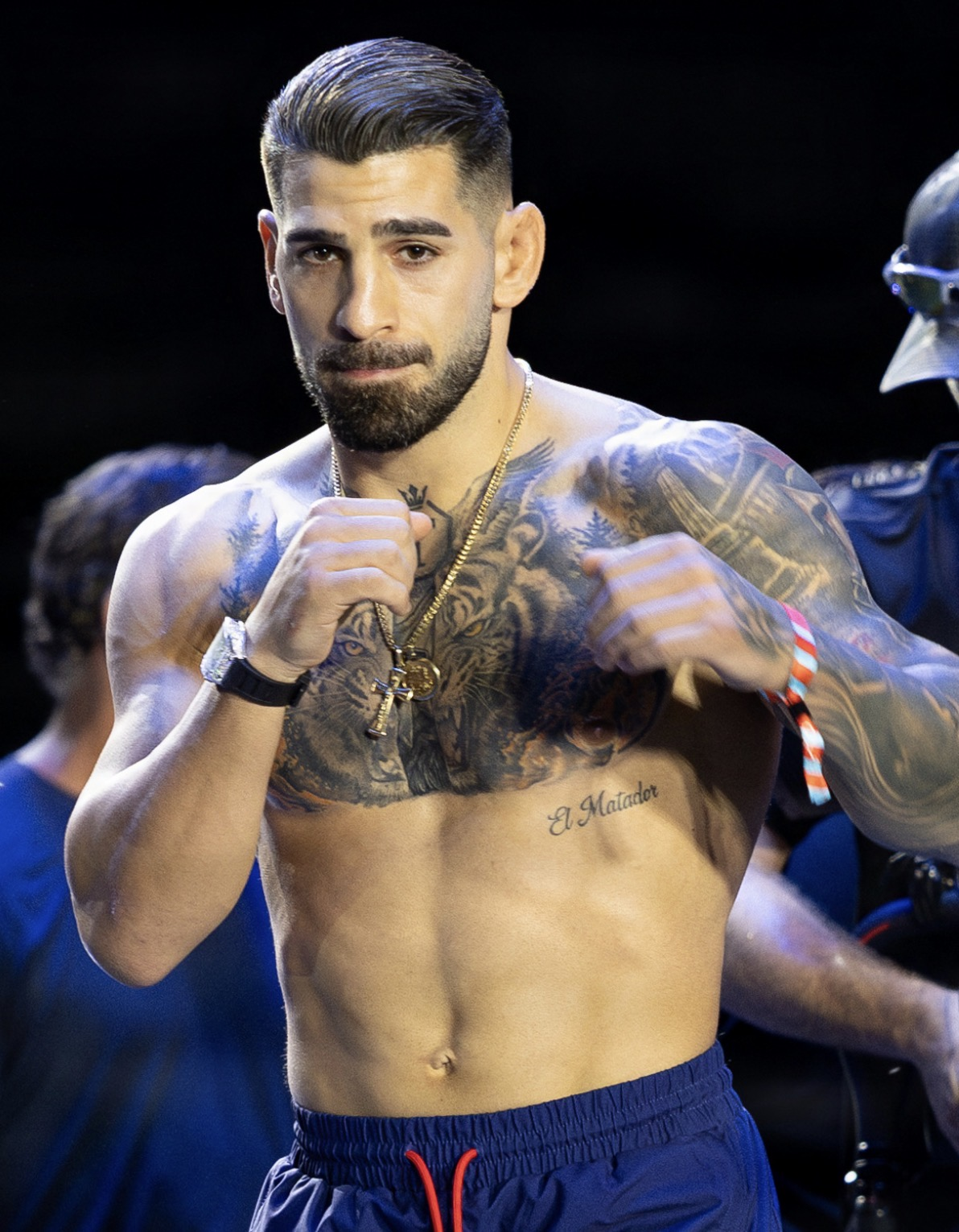
- Topuria at the UFC Freedom 250 in 2026
- Born: January 21, 1997 (age 29); Halle, North Rhine-Westphalia, Germany
- Native name: ილია თოფურია
- Other names: El Matador (The Killer)
- Nationality: Georgian; Spanish
- Height: 5 ft 8 in (173 cm)
- Weight: 155 lb (70 kg; 11 st 1 lb)
- Division: Bantamweight (2018); Featherweight (2015–2021, 2022–2025); Lightweight (2022, 2025–present)
- Reach: 69 in (175 cm)
- Stance: Orthodox
- Fighting out of: Alicante, Spain
- Team: Climent Club (2012–2025); Topuria Team (2025–present)
- Rank: Black belt in Brazilian jiu-jitsu under Jorge and Agustín Climent
- Years active: 2015–present

Mixed martial arts record
- Total: 18
- Wins: 17
- By knockout: 7
- By submission: 8
- By decision: 2
- Losses: 1
- By knockout: 1

Other information
- Notable relatives: Aleksandre Topuria (brother)
- Website: iliatopuriaoficial.com
- Mixed martial arts record from Sherdog

YouTube information
- Channel: ILIA TOPURIA
- Subscribers: 724 thousand
- Views: 73 million
- Last updated: November 12, 2026

Ilia Topuria (Georgian: ილია თოფურია; born January 21, 1997) is a Georgian and Spanish professional mixed martial artist. He currently competes in the Lightweight division of the Ultimate Fighting Championship (UFC). He became the 10th multi-division champion where he is the former UFC Lightweight Champion and Featherweight Champion, becoming the first Georgian and Spanish fighter to win a UFC championship and first undefeated fighter to win UFC championships in two divisions. As of June 16, 2026, he is #1 in the Meta UFC lightweight rankings, and #5 in the UFC men's pound-for-pound rankings.

Fight Matrix ranks him in the top 10 featherweights of all time and the top 25 lightweights of all time. Topuria has a 95.2% takedown defense rate being the #2 all-time in UFC Takedown Defense.

== Background ==
Topuria was born in Halle Westfalen, North Rhine-Westphalia, Germany. to Georgian parents who were refugees from Abkhazia. At the age of seven, Topuria moved to Georgia with his family and started practicing Greco-Roman wrestling at a local school. After the Russo-Georgian War, at the age of 15, they once again relocated, this time to Alicante, Spain. He began training Brazilian jiu-jitsu at Climent gym at the age of 15, before switching over to mixed martial arts. In 2014, Topuria won a silver medal at the IBJJF European 2014 Brazilian Jiu-Jitsu tournament in the juniors category. In 2015, Topuria made his debut as a professional in local competitions.

== Mixed martial arts career ==
=== Early career ===
Topuria started his career with four straight submission wins on the Spanish regional scene and won a belt in Mix Fight Events promotion. In 2018, he competed in his first international fight at Cage MMA Finland. In May 2018, he became the first Georgian black belt in Brazilian Jiu-jitsu alongside his brother, Alex Topuria. Months later he received the opportunity to fight for the Cage Warriors Bantamweight Championship at the Lotto Arena in Antwerp, Belgium. Ilia failed to make the agreed weight so despite winning the fight quickly, he did not get the belt.

In 2019, he signed with Brave Combat Federation. Ilia made his promotional debut in Bogotá, Colombia, defeating Luis Gomez in the first round by submission; which earned him the award for best performance of the night. On November 15, 2019, in Bahrain, he won his second fight in BRAVE by defeating Steven Goncalves by KO in the first round.

=== Ultimate Fighting Championship ===
Topuria, as a replacement for Seung Woo Choi, took a bout on short notice against Youssef Zalal on October 11, 2020 at UFC Fight Night: Moraes vs. Sandhagen. Topuria won the fight via unanimous decision.

Topuria faced Damon Jackson on December 5, 2020, at UFC on ESPN: Hermansson vs. Vettori. He won the fight via knockout in round one.

Topuria faced Ryan Hall on July 10, 2021, at UFC 264. He won the fight via knockout in round one.

Topuria was scheduled to face Movsar Evloev on January 22, 2022, at UFC 270. However, Evloev withdrew from the bout for undisclosed reasons and was replaced by Charles Jourdain. However, Topuria was pulled from the card due to a medical issue related to cutting weight and the bout was cancelled.

Topuria faced Jai Herbert, replacing Mike Davis, on March 19, 2022, at UFC Fight Night 204. Topuria suffered a knockdown from a head kick in round one, but recovered and won the fight via knockout in round two. With this win, he received the Performance of the Night award.

Topuria was scheduled to face Edson Barboza on October 29, 2022, at UFC Fight Night 213. However, Barboza withdrew in late September due to a knee injury.

Topuria faced Bryce Mitchell on December 10, 2022, at UFC 282. He won the fight via submission in round two. This win earned him the Performance of the Night award.

Topuria was initially scheduled to face Josh Emmett on June 17, 2023, at UFC on ESPN 47. However, the bout was shifted to headline UFC on ABC: Emmett vs. Topuria on June 24, 2023. He won the fight via unanimous decision. The bout earned him the Fight of the Night award.

==== UFC Featherweight Champion ====
In October 2023, Topuria was scheduled to face Alexander Volkanovski on January 20, 2024, for the UFC Featherweight Championship at UFC 297. However, on 10 days' notice replacing an injured Charles Oliveira, Volkanovski faced Islam Makhachev for the UFC Lightweight Championship at UFC 294 on October 21, 2023, and was knocked out in the first round. As a result, Topuria vs. Volkanovski was pushed back one month to headline UFC 298 on February 17, 2024. Topuria won the featherweight championship via knockout in the second round, ending Volkanovski's four-year reign. This fight earned him the Performance of the Night award.

Topuria defended his UFC Featherweight Championship against former champion Max Holloway on October 26, 2024, at UFC 308. He won by knockout in the third round, the first knockout loss of Holloway's career. This fight earned him another Performance of the Night award.

==== Vacating title ====
Despite rumors of a rematch between Topuria and Volkanovski, on February 19, 2025, it was announced Topuria would vacate his title as soon as the featherweight championship main event at UFC 314 started. UFC president Dana White explained Topuria's unexpected move, citing difficulties cutting weight, a lack of interest in the division's competition, and a desire to move up to lightweight permanently.

==== UFC Lightweight Champion ====
Topuria faced former UFC Lightweight Champion Charles Oliveira for the vacant UFC Lightweight Championship on June 28, 2025, at UFC 317. He defeated Oliveira by knockout at 2:27 of the first round, becoming the 10th multi-division champion in UFC history. He became the first UFC two-division champion while maintaining an undefeated record. The fight earned him another Performance of the Night award. Following the bout, Topuria was promoted to #1 in the UFC pound-for-pound rankings. However, the #1 ranking was given back to Islam Makhachev on November 19, 2025, after he claimed the welterweight championship.

In November 2025, Topuria announced that he would not compete in the first quarter of 2026 due to personal reasons.

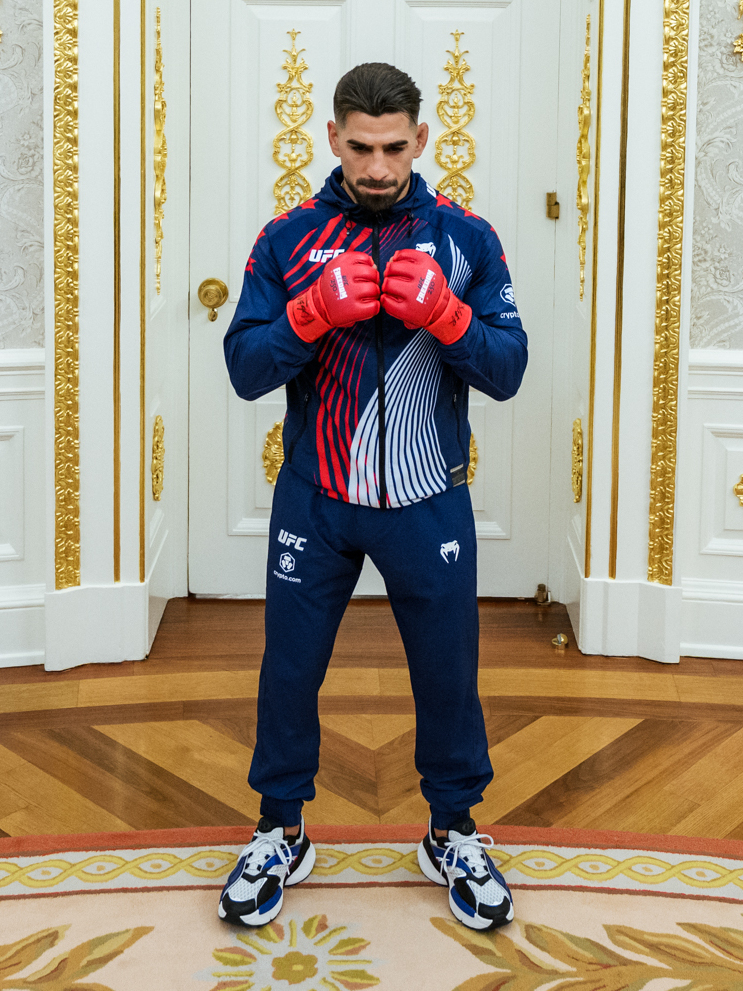
Ilia Topuria on his UFC Freedom 250 Walkout

Topuria attempted to make his title defense against interim champion Justin Gaethje in the main event on June 14, 2026 at UFC Freedom 250. He lost the championship by technical knockout via corner stoppage at the end of fourth round, marking his first loss in mixed martial arts. This fight earned him a $400,000 Fight of the Night award. In addition, Topuria and Gaethje split a $1 million CRO Crypto.com bonus, receiving $500,000 each.

== Fighting style and training ==
Initially coming into the UFC organization with a strong base in Brazilian Jiu-Jitsu, Topuria dedicated himself to enhancing his stand-up game, developing a boxing-heavy approach under the guidance of experienced coaches. His boxing style is marked by precise shot selection, fluid combinations, and remarkable power, which was on full display during his knockout victories over Alexander Volkanovski, Max Holloway, and Charles Oliveira. Following his knockout loss, Oliveira praised Topuria's striking power, stating that he was "definitely the one who hit me the hardest" out of all his UFC opponents. Topuria's execution of boxing is strategic, using his footwork and positioning to set up clean, fight-altering punches. He is also known for his defensive techniques such as his use of the shoulder roll against Josh Emmett. He has cited the Mexican boxing style, particularly that of Canelo Álvarez, as a major inspiration for his striking, adapting its principles to mixed martial arts.

Topuria has trained with fellow Georgian and former UFC Bantamweight Champion Merab Dvalishvili, who has praised Topuria's grappling skills, stating that he has "great wrestling, great jiu-jitsu,". Dvalishvili also brought up Topuria's striking power, stating that he "hits hard" and Topuria had dropped him twice with body shots in sparring sessions.

== Personal life ==
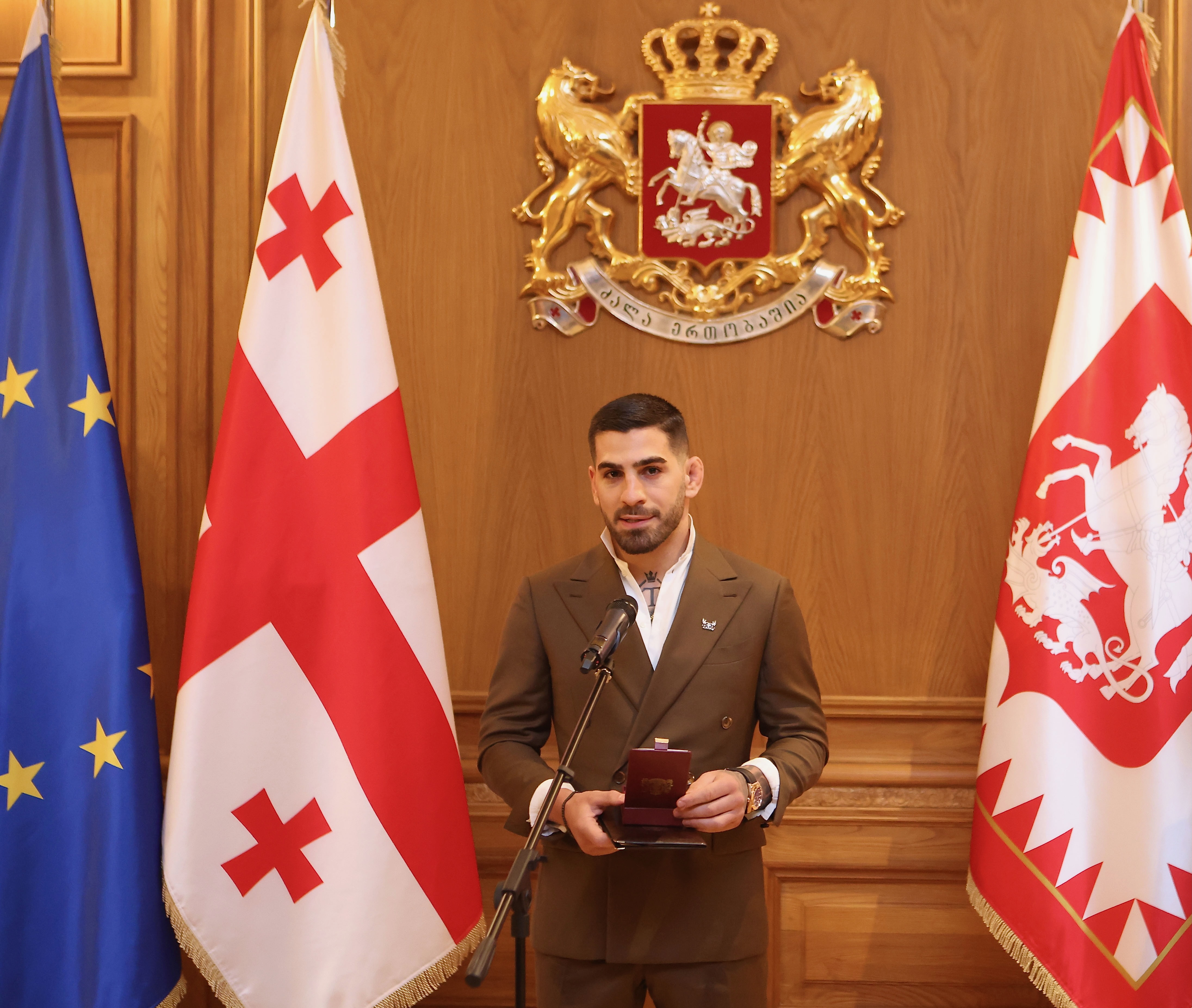
Topuria accepting an award from the President of Georgia at the Orbeliani Palace

Topuria is fluent in Georgian, English, Spanish, and also speaks a bit of Mingrelian. Topuria has a son (born 2019) and daughter (born 2024) from his previous wife, Giorgina Uzcategui Badell.

In August 2025 Topuria's relationship with his former spouse Giorgina Uzcategui officially ended and Topuria filed a civil divorce petition in Spain in late October of that same year. According to El Mundo, Topuria was called to Court of Violence against Women on January 7, 2026 following a criminal complaint. Topuria refuted these claims stating that it was a family and administrative matter involving an issue related to his daughter's travel outside of Spain.

Topuria is a Christian.

Topuria's older brother Aleksandre Topuria, also a mixed martial artist, debuted with the UFC in February 2025 at UFC 312.

On March 5, 2024, Topuria obtained Spanish citizenship after it was announced at the Council of Ministers press conference.

On March 21, 2024, Topuria was awarded the Order of Honor by the President of Georgia in Orbeliani Palace, Tbilisi, Georgia. That day, Georgian Prime Minister Irakli Kobakhidze announced that the government will ensure Ilia retains his Georgian citizenship, making him a dual citizen of Georgia and Spain.

On May 6, 2026, Topuria visited the Oval Office and met US President Donald Trump alongside UFC fighters Justin Gaethje, Alex Pereira, and Ciryl Gane. The visit was mainly to promote UFC Freedom 250, held at the White House.

== Championships and accomplishments ==
=== Mixed martial arts ===
- Ultimate Fighting Championship
  - UFC Lightweight Championship (One time, former)
    - First two-division champion with an undefeated record
    - Tenth multi-division champion in UFC history
  - UFC Featherweight Championship (One time)
    - One successful title defense
    - First Georgian champion in UFC history
  - Performance of the Night (Five times) vs. Jai Herbert, Bryce Mitchell, Alexander Volkanovski, Max Holloway and Charles Oliveira
  - Fight of the Night (Two times) vs. Josh Emmett and Justin Gaethje
    - $500,000 CRO Crypto.com UFC Freedom 250 bonus winner
  - Tied (Chuck Liddell, Quinton Jackson, Josh Emmett, Cody Garbrandt & Montel Jackson) for most consecutive fights with a knockdown landed in UFC history (7)
  - UFC Men's Pound-For-Pound No. 1 in 2025
  - Holds wins over three former UFC champions — vs. Alexander Volkanovski, Max Holloway and Charles Oliveira
  - UFC Honors Awards
    - 2024: President's Choice Performance of the Year Nominee vs. Alexander Volkanovski & President's Choice Performance of the Year Nominee vs. Max Holloway
    - 2025: Fan's Choice Knockout of the Year Winner & President's Choice Performance of the Year Nominee vs. Charles Oliveira
  - UFC.com Awards
    - 2020: Ranked #8 Newcomer of the Year
    - 2022: Ranked #7 Knockout of the Year vs. Jai Herbert & Ranked #9 Submission of the Year vs. Bryce Mitchell
    - 2024: Fighter of the Year (Tied with Alex Pereira), Ranked #2 Knockout of the Year vs. Max Holloway & Ranked #6 Knockout of the Year vs. Alexander Volkanovski
    - 2025: Ranked #4 Knockout of the Year vs. Charles Oliveira & Half-Year Awards: Best Knockout of the 1HY vs. Charles Oliveira
- Mix Fight Events
  - MFE Featherweight Championship (One time)
- The Sporting News
  - 2024 Fighter of the Year
- Forbes
  - 2024 UFC Fighter of the Year
- Yahoo Sports / Uncrowned
  - 2024 MMA Fighter of the Year
  - 2025 #5 Ranked Knockout of the Year vs. Charles Oliveira at UFC 317
- Bleacher Report
  - 2024 Fighter of the Year
- Bloody Elbow
  - 2024 Fighter of the Year
- CBS Sports
  - 2024 UFC Fighter of the Year
- MMA Junkie
  - 2022 December Submission of the Month vs. Bryce Mitchell
  - 2024 Male Fighter of the Year
- BodySlam.net
  - 2024 Male Fighter of the Year
- MMA Fighting
  - 2024 First Team MMA All-Star
  - 2025 #3 Knockout of the Year vs. Charles Oliveira at UFC 317
- MMA Mania
  - 2024 Fighter of the Year
  - 2024 #4 Ranked Knockout of the Year vs. Alexander Volkanovski at UFC 298
- The Wrightway Sports Network
  - 2025 Knockout of the Year vs. Charles Oliveira at UFC 317

== Mixed martial arts record ==
Professional record breakdown
18 matches	17 wins	1 loss
By knockout	7	1
By submission	8	0
By decision	2	0

Res.	Record	Opponent	Method	Event	Date	Round	Time	Location	Notes
Loss	17–1	Justin Gaethje	TKO (corner stoppage)	UFC Freedom 250	June 14, 2026	4	5:00	Washington, D.C., United States	Lost the UFC Lightweight Championship. Fight of the Night.
Win	17–0	Charles Oliveira	KO (punches)	UFC 317	June 28, 2025	1	2:27	Las Vegas, Nevada, United States	Return to Lightweight. Won the vacant UFC Lightweight Championship. Performance of the Night.
Win	16–0	Max Holloway	KO (punches)	UFC 308	October 26, 2024	3	1:34	Abu Dhabi, United Arab Emirates	Defended the UFC Featherweight Championship. Performance of the Night. Later vacated the title on April 12, 2025.
Win	15–0	Alexander Volkanovski	KO (punch)	UFC 298	February 17, 2024	2	3:32	Anaheim, California, United States	Won the UFC Featherweight Championship. Performance of the Night.
Win	14–0	Josh Emmett	Decision (unanimous)	UFC on ABC: Emmett vs. Topuria	June 24, 2023	5	5:00	Jacksonville, Florida, United States	Fight of the Night.
Win	13–0	Bryce Mitchell	Submission (arm-triangle choke)	UFC 282	December 10, 2022	2	3:10	Las Vegas, Nevada, United States	Return to Featherweight. Performance of the Night.
Win	12–0	Jai Herbert	KO (punches)	UFC Fight Night: Volkov vs. Aspinall	March 19, 2022	2	1:07	London, England	Lightweight debut. Performance of the Night.
Win	11–0	Ryan Hall	KO (punches)	UFC 264	July 10, 2021	1	4:47	Las Vegas, Nevada, United States	
Win	10–0	Damon Jackson	KO (punches)	UFC on ESPN: Hermansson vs. Vettori	December 5, 2020	1	2:38	Las Vegas, Nevada, United States	
Win	9–0	Youssef Zalal	Decision (unanimous)	UFC Fight Night: Moraes vs. Sandhagen	October 11, 2020	3	5:00	Abu Dhabi, United Arab Emirates	
Win	8–0	Steven Goncalves	KO (punch)	Brave CF 29	November 15, 2019	1	3:42	Isa Town, Bahrain	
Win	7–0	Luis Gomez	Submission (triangle straight armbar)	Brave CF 26	September 7, 2019	1	1:15	Bogotá, Colombia	Return to Featherweight.
Win	6–0	Brian Bouland	Technical Submission (anaconda choke)	Cage Warriors 94	June 16, 2018	1	1:39	Antwerp, Belgium	For the vacant Cage Warriors Bantamweight Championship; Topuria missed weight (139.4 lb) and was ineligible to win the title.
Win	5–0	Mika Hämäläinen	Submission (guillotine choke)	CAGE 43	April 28, 2018	1	3:35	Helsinki, Finland	Bantamweight debut.
Win	4–0	Jhon Guarin	Submission (guillotine choke)	Mix Fight Events 28	November 5, 2016	2	2:50	Valencia, Spain	Won the vacant MFE Featherweight Championship.
Win	3–0	Daniel Vasquez	Submission (rear-naked choke)	Mix Fight Events 26	May 7, 2016	1	1:50	Alicante, Spain	Catchweight (141 lb) bout.
Win	2–0	Kalil Martin El Chalibi	Submission (rear-naked choke)	Climent Show MMA 4	May 9, 2015	1	1:03	Alicante, Spain	
Win	1–0	Francisco Javier Asprilla	Submission (triangle choke)	Mix Fight Events 17	April 4, 2015	1	3:30	Valencia, Spain	Featherweight debut.

== Pay-per-view bouts ==
No.	Event	Fight	Date	Venue	City	PPV Buys
1.	UFC 298	Volkanovski vs. Topuria	February 17, 2024	Honda Center	Anaheim, California, United States	Not Disclosed
2.	UFC 308	Topuria vs. Holloway	October 26, 2024	Etihad Arena	Abu Dhabi, United Arab Emirates	Not Disclosed
3.	UFC 317	Topuria vs. Oliveira	June 28, 2025	T-Mobile Arena	Las Vegas, Nevada, United States	Not Disclosed

== See also ==
- List of current UFC fighters
- List of male mixed martial artists
- List of UFC champions
- Double champions in MMA

Awards and achievements
Preceded by Alexander Volkanovski	6th UFC Featherweight Champion; February 17, 2024 – April 12, 2025; Vacated	Vacant Title next held by Alexander Volkanovski
Vacant Title last held by Islam Makhachev	13th UFC Lightweight Champion; 28 June 2025 – 14 June 2026	Succeeded by Justin Gaethje
