= Bryce Mitchell =

American mixed martial artist (born 1994)

- Born: Bryce Andrew Mitchell; October 4, 1994 (age 32); Texarkana, Arkansas, U.S.
- Nickname: Thug Nasty
- Height: 5 ft 9 in (175 cm)
- Weight: 135 lb (61 kg; 9 st 9 lb)
- Division: Bantamweight (2015, 2025–present); Featherweight (2015–2025)
- Reach: 70 in (178 cm)
- Stance: Southpaw
- Fighting out of: Searcy, Arkansas, U.S.
- Team: Barata MMA (2012–present)
- Trainer: Willie McGlothlin; Rolando Delgado
- Rank: Black belt in Brazilian Jiu-Jitsu
- Years active: 2015–present

Mixed martial arts record
- Total: 22
- Wins: 19
- By knockout: 1
- By submission: 10
- By decision: 8
- Losses: 3
- By knockout: 1
- By submission: 2

Amateur record
- Total: 11
- Wins: 10
- By knockout: 1
- By submission: 9
- Losses: 1
- By submission: 1

Other information
- University: Harding University
- Mixed martial arts record from Sherdog

Bryce Andrew Mitchell (born October 4, 1994) is an American professional mixed martial artist. He currently competes in the Bantamweight division of the Ultimate Fighting Championship (UFC). Mitchell appeared in the reality television series The Ultimate Fighter: Undefeated. As of October 10, 2026, he is #14 in the Meta UFC bantamweight rankings.

== Background ==
Mitchell was born in Texarkana, Arkansas, and raised in Cabot, Arkansas, where he attended Cabot High School. He played multiple sports, including basketball for the varsity team and wrestling, in which he placed second at the 7A state championships as a junior and fourth at the 6A state championships as a senior. After high school, Mitchell moved to Searcy, Arkansas, to attend Harding University.

== Mixed martial arts career ==
=== Early career ===
After racking up an undefeated professional MMA record of 9–0, Mitchell was chosen to compete in The Ultimate Fighter: Undefeated Featherweight tournament. He defeated Jay Cucciniello in the quarterfinals but ended up losing to the eventual season winner Brad Katona in the semi-finals. Despite the loss, Mitchell was signed to the UFC.

=== Ultimate Fighting Championship ===
Mitchell faced Tyler Diamond on July 6, 2018, at The Ultimate Fighter: Undefeated. He won the fight by majority decision.

Mitchell faced Bobby Moffett on March 23, 2019, at UFC Fight Night: Thompson vs. Pettis. He won the fight by unanimous decision. This fight earned the Fight of the Night award.

Mitchell faced Matt Sayles on December 7, 2019, at UFC on ESPN: Overeem vs. Rozenstruik. He won the fight by submission from a twister in the first round; this was only the second twister submission victory in UFC history. This win earned him the Performance of the Night award and it was named the 2019 Submission of the Year by sites like Sherdog, MMAJunkie and MMA Fighting. Subsequently, Mitchell signed a new, four-fight contract with the UFC.

Mitchell was scheduled to face Charles Rosa on May 2, 2020, at UFC Fight Night: Hermansson vs. Weidman. However, on April 9, Dana White, the president of UFC announced that this event was postponed and the bout took place on May 9, 2020, at UFC 249. After nearly submitting Rosa on numerous occasions, Mitchell won the fight via unanimous decision with the three scorecards listing 30–25, 30–25, and 30–24 scores.

Mitchell faced Andre Fili on October 31, 2020, at UFC Fight Night: Hall vs. Silva. This bout marked the first time a fighter has worn custom trunks since the Reebok deal with the promotion, as Mitchell used camo shorts during the contest. He won the fight by unanimous decision.

Mitchell faced Edson Barboza on March 5, 2022, at UFC 272. He won the fight via unanimous decision.

Mitchell was scheduled to face Movsar Evloev as a main event on November 5, 2022, at UFC Fight Night: Rodriguez vs. Lemos. However, Evloev withdrew in mid October due to injury and the bout was scrapped.

Mitchell faced Ilia Topuria on December 10, 2022, at UFC 282. He lost the fight via submission in round two.

Mitchell was scheduled to face Jonathan Pearce on May 6, 2023, at UFC 288. However, Pearce was forced to withdraw from the event due to injury, and was replaced by Movsar Evloev. In turn, Mitchell withdrew due to recurring back injury and was replaced by Diego Lopes.

Mitchell faced Dan Ige on September 23, 2023, at UFC Fight Night 228. He won the fight via unanimous decision.

Mitchell faced Josh Emmett, replacing injured Giga Chikadze, on December 16, 2023, at UFC 296. He lost the fight via knockout in the first round.

Mitchell faced Kron Gracie on December 7, 2024, at UFC 310. He won the fight by knockout via ground elbows in the third round, leading to his first knockout victory in MMA.

Mitchell faced Jean Silva on April 12, 2025 at UFC 314. He lost the fight via a ninja choke submission in the second round.

Mitchell returned to the bantamweight division and faced Said Nurmagomedov on July 26, 2025 at UFC on ABC 9. He won the fight by unanimous decision.

Mitchell was scheduled to face Victor Henry on June 6, 2026, at UFC Fight Night 278. In turn, Henry pulled out on May 28 and was replaced by Santiago Luna. Mitchell won the fight via an arm-triangle submission in the third round.

== Grappling career ==
Mitchell was scheduled to face Ilay Barzilay at Pit Submission Series 12 on February 28, 2025. However, he withdrew from the match on a few days’ notice when he was offered an MMA fight against Jean Silva.

Mitchell made his official grappling debut on September 25, 2025 at the at EBI 25 tournament. He faced JJ Bowers in the first round and won the contest via ride time. Mitchell then faced Landon Elmore in the second round, he lost after getting submitted via a heel hook.

Mitchell faced Jean Silva in a submission grappling match at Hype Fighting: Brazil on March 11, 2026. The match ended in a draw after 8 minutes.

On September 25, 2026, Mitchell faced UFC BBJ bantamweight champion Mikey Musumeci in a non-title fight featherweight bout at UFC BBJ 11. He lost via unanimous decision.

== Personal life ==
Mitchell has a degree in economics from Harding University. Outside of his mixed martial arts career, he is a cattle farmer. Mitchell owns a farm in Arkansas where he also trains. He enjoys being in nature and living a rugged lifestyle. He is interested in self-sufficiency: producing his own food, working the land, while minimizing dependence on outside systems.

Mitchell is married to his wife Erin and they have a son together, born in 2024. Mitchell is a Christian.

In 2021, Mitchell released a seven-track country rap mixtape titled "Pasture Fire".

== Controversies ==
=== Conspiracy theories ===
Mitchell is a conspiracy theorist, voicing his belief that SARS-CoV-2 was created in a lab by the U.S. government and deliberately released, and that the U.S. government stages mass shootings to advance a gun confiscation agenda. He has also criticized the Federal Reserve as a "corrupt institution" that is manipulating the value of the U.S. dollar. He is also a flat Earther and believes that gravity is a hoax. In 2024, he indicated that he would homeschool his son because he did not want him to be a Communist, to worship Satan, or to be gay. In July 2024, Mitchell called Elon Musk a false prophet and potential antichrist, and his company Tesla a "scam".

=== Hitler and Holocaust denial ===
In January 2025, he made several controversial statements, including praise for Adolf Hitler, denial of the Holocaust, and anti-LGBTQ remarks. He stated, "I honestly think that Hitler was a good guy based upon my own research, not my public education indoctrination" and further claimed, "When you realize there's no possible way they could've burned and cremated six million bodies, you're gonna realize the Holocaust ain't real." Additionally, Mitchell suggested that "greedy Jews" were "destroying his country and turning them all into gays" and referenced early gender-affirming surgeries in Germany as evidence of societal decline. Despite widespread condemnation—including from UFC president Dana White—White stated that Mitchell would not face disciplinary action from the UFC, citing free speech protections.

== Championships and accomplishments ==
- Ultimate Fighting Championship
  - Performance of the Night (One time) vs. Matt Sayles
  - Fight of the Night (One time) vs. Bobby Moffett
  - UFC Honors Awards
    - 2019: Fan's Choice Submission of the Year Winner vs. Matt Sayles & President's Choice Performance of the Year Nominee vs. Matt Sayles
  - UFC.com Awards
    - 2019: Submission of the Year vs. Matt Sayles
- V3 Fights
  - V3 Featherweight Champion (one time)
  - One successful title defense
- ESPN
  - 2019 Submission of the Year vs. Matt Sayles at UFC on ESPN: Overeem vs. Rozenstruik
- Bloody Elbow
  - 2019 Submission of the Year vs. Matt Sayles at UFC on ESPN: Overeem vs. Rozenstruik
- Cageside Press
  - 2019 Submission of the Year vs. Matt Sayles at UFC on ESPN: Overeem vs. Rozenstruik
- Combat Press
  - 2019 Submission of the Year vs. Matt Sayles at UFC on ESPN: Overeem vs. Rozenstruik
- MMA Junkie
  - 2019 December Submission of the Month vs. Matt Sayles at UFC on ESPN: Overeem vs. Rozenstruik
  - 2019 Submission of the Year vs. Matt Sayles at UFC on ESPN: Overeem vs. Rozenstruik
- MMA Fighting
  - 2019 Submission of the Year vs. Matt Sayles at UFC on ESPN: Overeem vs. Rozenstruik
- Sherdog
  - 2019 Submission of the Year vs. Matt Sayles at UFC on ESPN: Overeem vs. Rozenstruik
- LowKick MMA
  - 2019 Submission of the Year vs. Matt Sayles at UFC on ESPN: Overeem vs. Rozenstruik
- MMA Sucka
  - 2019 Submission of the Year vs. Matt Sayles at UFC on ESPN: Overeem vs. Rozenstruik

== Mixed martial arts record ==
Professional record breakdown
22 matches	19 wins	3 losses
By knockout	1	1
By submission	10	2
By decision	8	0

Res.	Record	Opponent	Method	Event	Date	Round	Time	Location	Notes
Win	19–3	Santiago Luna	Submission (arm-triangle choke)	UFC Fight Night: Muhammad vs. Bonfim	June 6, 2026	3	4:52	Las Vegas, Nevada, United States	
Win	18–3	Said Nurmagomedov	Decision (unanimous)	UFC on ABC: Whittaker vs. de Ridder	July 26, 2025	3	5:00	Abu Dhabi, United Arab Emirates	Return to Bantamweight.
Loss	17–3	Jean Silva	Submission (ninja choke)	UFC 314	April 12, 2025	2	3:52	Miami, Florida, United States	
Win	17–2	Kron Gracie	KO (slam and elbows)	UFC 310	December 7, 2024	3	0:39	Las Vegas, Nevada, United States	
Loss	16–2	Josh Emmett	KO (punch)	UFC 296	December 16, 2023	1	1:57	Las Vegas, Nevada, United States	
Win	16–1	Dan Ige	Decision (unanimous)	UFC Fight Night: Fiziev vs. Gamrot	September 23, 2023	3	5:00	Las Vegas, Nevada, United States	
Loss	15–1	Ilia Topuria	Submission (arm-triangle choke)	UFC 282	December 10, 2022	2	3:10	Las Vegas, Nevada, United States	
Win	15–0	Edson Barboza	Decision (unanimous)	UFC 272	March 5, 2022	3	5:00	Las Vegas, Nevada, United States	
Win	14–0	Andre Fili	Decision (unanimous)	UFC Fight Night: Hall vs. Silva	October 31, 2020	3	5:00	Las Vegas, Nevada, United States	
Win	13–0	Charles Rosa	Decision (unanimous)	UFC 249	May 9, 2020	3	5:00	Jacksonville, Florida, United States	
Win	12–0	Matt Sayles	Submission (twister)	UFC on ESPN: Overeem vs. Rozenstruik	December 7, 2019	1	4:20	Washington, D.C., United States	Catchweight (148.5 lb) bout; Sayles missed weight. Performance of the Night.
Win	11–0	Bobby Moffett	Decision (unanimous)	UFC Fight Night: Thompson vs. Pettis	March 23, 2019	3	5:00	Nashville, Tennessee, United States	Fight of the Night.
Win	10–0	Tyler Diamond	Decision (majority)	The Ultimate Fighter: Undefeated Finale	July 6, 2018	3	5:00	Las Vegas, Nevada, United States	
Win	9–0	Jose Mariscal	Decision (unanimous)	V3 Fights: Willis vs. Norwood	June 17, 2017	3	5:00	Memphis, Tennessee, United States	Defended the V3 Fights Featherweight Championship.
Win	8–0	Isaac Ware	Submission (rear-naked choke)	V3 Fights: Mitchell vs. Ware	January 14, 2017	1	1:30	Memphis, Tennessee, United States	Won the vacant V3 Fights Featherweight Championship.
Win	7–0	Brandon Phillips	Submission (triangle choke)	WSOF 33	October 7, 2016	2	3:14	Kansas City, Missouri, United States	Catchweight (151 lb) bout; Phillips missed weight.
Win	6–0	Bobby Taylor	Submission (triangle choke)	V3 Fights: Sanders vs. Anders	June 18, 2016	1	3:10	Memphis, Tennessee, United States	
Win	5–0	Jorge Medina	Submission (rear-naked choke)	WSOF 27	January 23, 2016	1	1:02	Memphis, Tennessee, United States	
Win	4–0	Chris Culley	Submission (armbar)	V3 Fights: Hall vs. Shelton	September 26, 2015	1	3:39	Memphis, Tennessee, United States	Catchweight (150 lb) bout.
Win	3–0	Tony Williams	Submission (rear-naked choke)	V3 Fights: Davis vs. Hall	June 20, 2015	1	4:31	Memphis, Tennessee, United States	
Win	2–0	Jesse Sanderson	Submission (rear-naked choke)	RFA vs. Legacy FC 1	May 8, 2015	1	2:09	Robinsonville, Mississippi, United States	Featherweight debut.
Win	1–0	Sheldon Smith	Submission (rear-naked choke)	V3 Fights: Johnson vs. Kennedy	January 24, 2015	1	3:01	Memphis, Tennessee, United States	Bantamweight debut.

=== Mixed martial arts exhibition record ===
Exhibition record breakdown		
2 matches	1 win	1 loss
By submission	0	1
By decision	1	0

Res.	Record	Opponent	Method	Event	Date	Round	Time	Location	Notes
Loss	1–1	Brad Katona	Submission (rear-naked choke)	The Ultimate Fighter: Undefeated	Jun 20, 2018 (airdate)	3	4:17	Las Vegas, Nevada, United States	TUF 27 Semi-final round.
Win	1–0	Jay Cucciniello	Decision (unanimous)	The Ultimate Fighter: Undefeated	May 9, 2018 (airdate)	2	5:00	Las Vegas, Nevada, United States	TUF 27 Quarterfinal round.

== See also ==
- List of current UFC fighters
- List of male mixed martial artists
