= 2023 in UFC =

Mixed martial arts events

Information
- First date: January 14, 2023
- Last date: December 16, 2023

Events
- Total events: 43
- UFC: 14
- TUF Finale events: 1

Fights
- Total fights: 520
- Title fights: 21

Chronology
2022 in UFC	2023 in UFC	2024 in UFC

The year 2023 was the 31st year in the history of the Ultimate Fighting Championship (UFC), a mixed martial arts promotion based in the United States.

== UFC in 2023 ==
=== UFC merged with WWE to form TKO Group ===
In April 2023, Endeavor Group Holdings announced that UFC would merge with the wrestling promotion WWE to form TKO Group Holdings, a new Public company majority-owned by Endeavor, with Vince McMahon serving as an executive chairman of the new entity and White remaining as UFC president. The merger was completed on September 12, 2023.

=== Class action: anti-trust lawsuit ===
On August 9, 2023, U.S. District Judge Richard Boulware decided to grant class action status to more than 1,200 former UFC fighters who competed between December 2010 and June 2017 who are suing upward of for 1.6 billions in wages that the lawsuit claims Zuffa had abused its power to suppress UFC fighters' wages, setting the stage on 8, April, 2024 trial.

=== Betting scandal ===
In early February 2023 UFC introduced rules that banned athletes, coaches, and their close family from betting on UFC events. after the call for a sports betting fraud investigation was made on a fight involving Darrick Minner a student of James Krause, who is a UFC coach and avid bettor, and Shayilan Nuerdanbieke at UFC Fight Night: Rodriguez vs. Lemos. The UFC was informed by sources that suspicious betting patterns had been observed on the fight.

=== USADA anti-doping partnership (2015–2024) ===
The UFC's partnership with USADA coming to an end in 2023, the UFC announced a new partnership with Drug Free Sport International, the same company that oversees the anti-doping programs of the NCAA, MLB, NFL, and NBA. This partnership is set to begin in 2024, after their current contract with USADA expired on December 31, 2023. The UFC announced that former FBI agent George Piro would serve as the independent administrator of the UFC's anti-doping program.

== 2023 by the numbers ==
The numbers below records the events, fights, techniques and fighters held or performed for the year of 2023 in UFC.

Events
Numbers	PPV	Continents	Countries	Cities	Fight Night Bonuses
43	14	4	8	21	189; Total $9.45 million
Longest Event	Shortest Event	Highest Income Live Gate	Lowest Income Live Gate	Highest Attendance	Lowest Attendance
UFC 286 2:57:58	UFC on ABC 4 1:31:36	UFC 295 $12,432,563	UFC Fight Night 221 $452,669.71	UFC 290 19,204	UFC Fight Night 221 (exclud. APEX events); 2,361
Title Fights
Undisputed Title Fights	Title Changes	Champions Remained in Their Divisions	Number of Champions	Number of Interim Champions	Number of Title Defenses
19	6	4 FW – Alexander Volkanovski; LW – Islam Makhachev; WW – Leon Edwards; WSW – Zhang Weili	16	2 FW – Yair Rodríguez; HW – Tom Aspinall	10
Fighters
Number of Fighters	UFC Debutants	Releases / Retired	Fighters Suspended		
(At the end of Dec 31, 2023); 606	125	102	20		
Champion feats
Jamahal Hill became the first UFC champion to come from Dana White's Contender Series.; Alexa Grasso became the first Mexican female champion in UFC history.; Israel Adesanya became the first two-time UFC Middleweight Champion; Aljamain Sterling became the first UFC Bantamweight Champion to record three consecutive title defenses
Fighter feats
Jéssica Andrade's 231 significant strikes at UFC 283 set a new record for the most in a women's flyweight bout.; Jamahal Hill's 232 significant strikes at UFC 283 set a new record for the most in a light heavyweight bout.; Merab Dvalishvili's 49 takedown attempts at UFC Fight Night 221 set a new record for the most in a UFC bout.; Sergei Pavlovich's six-fight first-round knockout streak is the longest in UFC history.; The bout between Jared Cannonier and Marvin Vettori at UFC on ESPN 47 featured a combined 394 significant strikes, the most in a middleweight bout.; Jared Cannonier's 241 significant strikes at UFC on ESPN 47 set a new record for the most in a middleweight bout.; Neil Magny earned his 14th decision victory, setting a new record for the most in UFC history.; Denise Gomes's 20‑second knockout at UFC 290 set a new record for the fastest in women’s strawweight history.; Brad Katona became the first two-time winner of The Ultimate Fighter reality-television series.; Zhang Weili's 296 total strikes at UFC 292 set a new record for most in a UFC women's bout.; Jailton Almeida's 21:10 minutes of ground control time at UFC Fight Night 231 set a new record for the most in a heavyweight bout.; Loopy Godínez became the first woman to win four UFC bouts in a calendar year.; Jéssica Andrade's four knockdowns at UFC 295 set a new record for most in a UFC women's bout.; The bout between Irene Aldana and Karol Rosa at UFC 296 featured a combined 349 significant strikes, the most in a women's bantamweight bout.

== 2023 UFC Honors awards ==
Starting in 2019, the UFC created year-end awards with "UFC Honors President's Choice Awards" for categories "Performance of the Year" and "Fight of the Year" being chosen by UFC CEO Dana White. The other "UFC Honors Fan Choice Awards" are for categories "Knockout of the Year", "Submission of the Year", "Event of the Year", "Comeback of the Year" and, from 2020, "Debut of the Year" in which fans are able to vote for the winner on social media.

Winners receive a trophy commemorating their achievement along with a set of tires from sponsor Toyo Tires.

2023 UFC Honors Awards
	Performance of the Year	Fight of the Year	Knockout of the Year	Submission of the Year	Debut of the Year	Event of the Year	Comeback of the Year
Winner	Sean O'Malley defeats Aljamain Sterling; UFC 292	Islam Makhachev defeats Alexander Volkanovski 1 UFC 284	Israel Adesanya defeats Alex Pereira 2 UFC 287	Jon Jones defeats Ciryl Gane; UFC 285	Bo Nickal defeats Jamie Pickett; UFC 285	UFC 285: Jones vs. Gane	Edson Barboza defeats Sodiq Yusuff; UFC Fight Night: Yusuff vs. Barboza
Nominee	Alexa Grasso defeats Valentina Shevchenko 1 UFC 285	Jamahal Hill defeats Glover Teixeira; UFC 283	Justin Gaethje defeats Dustin Poirier 2 UFC 291	Davey Grant defeats Raphael Assunção; UFC Fight Night: Yan vs. Dvalishvili	Gabriel Bonfim defeats Mounir Lazzez; UFC 283	UFC 287: Pereira vs. Adesanya 2	C.J. Vergara defeats Daniel da Silva; UFC on ESPN: Vera vs. Sandhagen
Nominee	Jon Jones defeats Ciryl Gane; UFC 285	Shavkat Rakhmonov defeats Geoff Neal; UFC 285	Sean O'Malley defeats Aljamain Sterling; UFC 292	Da'Mon Blackshear defeats Jose Johnson; UFC on ESPN: Luque vs. dos Anjos	Ismael Bonfim defeats Terrance McKinney; UFC 283	UFC 290: Volkanovski vs. Rodríguez	Elves Brener defeats Guram Kutateladze; UFC on ESPN: Strickland vs. Magomedov
Nominee	Israel Adesanya defeats Alex Pereira 2 UFC 287	Justin Gaethje defeats Rafael Fiziev; UFC 286	Islam Makhachev defeats Alexander Volkanovski 2 UFC 294	Alexander Volkov defeats Tai Tuivasa; UFC 293	Ikram Aliskerov defeats Phil Hawes; UFC 288	UFC 291: Poirier vs. Gaethje 2	Michał Oleksiejczuk defeats Chidi Njokuani; UFC Fight Night: Holloway vs. The Korean Zombie
Nominee	Sean Strickland defeats Israel Adesanya; UFC 293	Alexandre Pantoja defeats Brandon Moreno 2 UFC 290	—N/a	—N/a	—N/a	—N/a	—N/a
Ref							

== 2023 UFC.com awards ==
2023 UFC.COM Awards
No	Best Fighter	The Upsets	The Submissions	The Newcomers	The Knockouts	The Fights
1	Islam Makhachev	Alexa Grasso defeats Valentina Shevchenko 1 UFC 285	Alexa Grasso defeats Valentina Shevchenko 1 UFC 285	Diego Lopes	Josh Emmett defeats Bryce Mitchell; UFC 296	Islam Makhachev defeats Alexander Volkanovski 1 UFC 284
2	Alexa Grasso	Sean Strickland defeats Israel Adesanya; UFC 293	Da’Mon Blackshear defeats Jose Johnson; UFC on ESPN: Luque vs. dos Anjos	Bo Nickal	Israel Adesanya defeat Alex Pereira 2 UFC 287	Alexandre Pantoja defeats Brandon Moreno 2 UFC 290
3	Leon Edwards	Bobby Green defeats Grant Dawson; UFC Fight Night: Dawson vs. Green	Shavkat Rakhmonov defeats Geoff Neal; UFC 285	Ikram Aliskerov	Justin Gaethje defeats Dustin Poirier; UFC 291	Irene Aldana defeats Karol Rosa; UFC 296
4	Sean Strickland	Bobby Green defeats Tony Ferguson; UFC 291	Jon Jones defeats Ciryl Gane; UFC 285	Elves Brener	Islam Makhachev defeats Alexander Volkanovski 2 UFC 294	Shavkat Rakhmonov defeats Geoff Neal; UFC 285
5	Alexandre Pantoja	Alexa Grasso draws with Valentina Shevchenko 2 UFC Fight Night: Grasso vs. Shevchenko 2	Ariane Lipski defeats Casey O'Neill; UFC 296	Steve Erceg	Charles Oliveira defeats Beneil Dariush; UFC 289	Jamahal Hill defeats Glover Teixeira; UFC 283
6	Tom Aspinall	Leon Edwards defeats Kamaru Usman 3 UFC 286	Erin Blanchfield defeats Jéssica Andrade; UFC Fight Night: Andrade vs. Blanchfield	Luana Santos	Tom Aspinall defeats Sergei Pavlovich; UFC 295	Dan Hooker defeats Jalin Turner; UFC 290
7	Benoît Saint Denis	Ariane Lipski defeats Casey O'Neill; UFC 296	Yair Rodríguez defeats Josh Emmett; UFC 284	Nazim Sadykhov	Robbie Lawler defeats Niko Price; UFC 290	Justin Gaethje defeats Rafael Fiziev; UFC 286
8	Justin Gaethje	Tom Aspinall defeats Sergei Pavlovich; UFC 295	Diego Lopes defeats Gavin Tucker; UFC on ESPN: Sandhagen vs. Font	The Bonfim Brothers; Ismael Bonfirm & Gabriel Bonfirm	Edson Barboza defeats Billy Quarantillo; UFC on ESPN: Holloway vs. Allen	Edson Barboza defeats Sodiq Yusuff; UFC Fight Night: Yusuff vs. Barboza
9	Alex Pereira	Dricus du Plessis defeats Robert Whittaker; UFC 290	Rinat Fakhretdinov defeats Kevin Lee; UFC on ESPN: Strickland vs. Magomedov	Jeka Saragih	Ismael Bonfim defeats Terrance McKinney; UFC 283	Alexa Grasso defeats Valentina Shevchenko 1 UFC 285
10	Jon Jones	Shavkat Rakhmonov defeats Geoff Neal; UFC 285	Gillian Robertson defeats Piera Rodriguez; UFC on ESPN: Holloway vs. Allen	Rinya Nakamura	Carlos Diego Ferreira defeats Michael Johnson; UFC Fight Night: Dern vs. Hill	Alexa Grasso draws with Valentina Shevchenko 2 UFC Fight Night: Grasso vs. Shevchenko 2
Ref						

== Releases and retirements ==
These fighters have either been released from their UFC contracts, announced their retirement or joined other promotions:

Month	Day	ISO	Fighter	Division	Reason	Ref
January	4	(Brazil)	Francisco Trinaldo	Welterweight	Released	
January	10	(United States)	Mike Jackson	Welterweight	Released	
January	11	(United States)	Leah Letson	Women's Featherweight	Retired	
January	18	(Mexico)	Alejandro Pérez	Featherweight	Released	
January	18	(United States)	Brandon Davis	Bantamweight	Released	
January	18	(Russia)	Gadzhi Omargadzhiev	Welterweight	Released	
January	18	(United States)	Jay Perrin	Bantamweight	Released	
January	18	(United States)	Jeff Molina	Flyweight	Released	
January	18	(United States)	Kevin Natividad	Bantamweight	Released	
January	18	(Ukraine)	Liudvik Sholinian	Bantamweight	Released	
January	18	(Argentina)	Marcelo Rojo	Featherweight	Released	
January	18	(United States)	Michael Trizano	Featherweight	Released	
January	18	(Brazil)	Raulian Paiva	Bantamweight	Released	
January	18	(United States)	Sijara Eubanks	Women's Flyweight	Released	
January	18	(United States)	Vince Morales	Bantamweight	Released	
January	15	(Cameroon)	Francis Ngannou	Heavyweight	Released	
January	21	(Brazil)	Maurício Rua	Light Heavyweight	Retired	
January	21		Glover Teixeira	Light Heavyweight	Retired	
January	26	(United States)	Victor Rodriguez	Flyweight	Released	
January	27	(United States)	Kyle Daukaus	Middleweight	Released	
January	27	(Russia)	Shamil Abdurakhimov	Heavyweight	Released	
February	1	(England)	Darren Till	Middleweight	Released	
February	1	(United States)	José Johnson	Bantamweight	Released	
February	1	(Russia)	Zubaira Tukhugov	Featherweight	Released	
February	8	(United States)	Saidyokub Kakhramonov	Bantamweight	Released	
February	16	(Brazil)	Carlos Mota	Flyweight	Released	
February	19	(United States)	Lina Länsberg	Women's Bantamweight	Retired	
February	22	(United States)	William Knight	Light Heavyweight	Released	
February	22	(United States)	Jordan Wright	Light Heavyweight	Released	
March	11	(Brazil)	Raphael Assunção	Bantamweight	Retired	
March	23	(Brazil)	Augusto Sakai	Heavyweight	Released	
March	25	(United States)	Steven Peterson	Featherweight	Retired	
March	28	(Brazil)	Rafael Alves	Lightweight	Released	
March	28	(United States)	Leomana Martinez	Bantamweight	Released	
March	30	(Argentina)	Guido Cannetti	Bantamweight	Released	
April	9	(United States)	Jorge Masvidal	Welterweight	Retired	
April	11	(United States)	Cynthia Calvillo	Women's Strawweight	Released	
April	15	(United States)	Ed Herman	Light Heavyweight	Retired	
April	15	(United States)	Zak Cummings	Light Heavyweight	Retired	
April	21	(Spain)	Juan Espino	Heavyweight	Retired	
April	22	(Brazil)	Glover Teixeira	Light Heavyweight	Retired	
May	16	(United States)	Chase Sherman	Heavyweight	Released	
May	16	(South Korea)	Ji Yeon Kim	Women's Flyweight	Released	
May	16	(Australia)	Jessica-Rose Clark	Women's Bantamweight	Released	
June	5	(United States)	Ilir Latifi	Heavyweight	End of contract	
June	6	(Mongolia)	Danaa Batgerel	Bantamweight	Released	
June	6	(United States)	Joseph Holmes	Middleweight	Released	
June	6	(Finland)	Makwan Amirkhani	Featherweight	Released	
June	6	(Tunisia)	Mounir Lazzez	Welterweight	Released	
June	6	(Venezuela)	Omar Morales	Lightweight	Released	
June	6	(United States)	Tony Gravely	Bantamweight	Released	
June	6	(Guam)	Trevin Jones	Bantamweight	Released	
June	9	(United States)	Aaron Phillips	Bantamweight	Released	
June	9	(United States)	Don Shainis	Featherweight	Released	
June	9	(United States)	Erick Gonzalez	Lightweight	Released	
June	9	(United States)	Journey Newson	Featherweight	Released	
June	9	(Russia)	Maxim Grishin	Light Heavyweight	Released	
June	9	(United States)	Nick Fiore	Lightweight	Released	
June	9	(United States)	Orion Cosce	Welterweight	Released	
June	9	(Japan)	Takashi Sato	Welterweight	Released	
June	18	(Sweden)	Bea Malecki	Women's Bantamweight	Released	
June	18	(Brazil)	Maria Oliveira	Women's Strawweight	Released	
June	18	(United States)	Martin Sano Jr.	Welterweight	Released	
June	27	(United States)	Braxton Smith	Heavyweight	Suspended and released	
July	11	(United States)	Amanda Nunes	Women's Bantamweight	Retired	
July	13	(Kazakhstan)	Zhalgas Zhumagulov	Flyweight	Released	
July	20	(Bulgaria)	Blagoy Ivanov	Heavyweight	Released	
July	20	(Russia)	Damir Ismagulov	Lightweight	Released	
July	20	(United States)	Robbie Lawler	Welterweight	Released	
July	26	(United States)	The Korean Zombie	Featherweight	Retired	
August	5	(United States)	Ronnie Lawrence	Bantamweight	Retired	
August	11	(United States)	Charles Rosa	Featherweight	Released	
August	11	(Brazil)	Istela Nunes	Women's Strawweight	Released	
August	11	(Germany)	Mandy Böhm	Women's Flyweight	Released	
August	15	(United States)	Ian Heinisch	Middleweight	Retired	
August	18	(United States)	Aleksa Camur	Light Heavyweight	Released	
August	18	(United States)	Tanner Boser	Light Heavyweight	Released	
August	28	(United States)	Chris Daukaus	Light Heavyweight	Released	
August	29	(United States)	Ashlee Evans-Smith	Women's Bantamweight	Released	
August	29	(United States)	Tafon Nchukwi	Middleweight	Released	
September	14	(United States)	Derek Brunson	Middleweight	Released	
September	15	(France)	Zarah Fairn	Women's Featherweight	Released	
September	19	(United States)	Cortney Casey	Women's Flyweight	Released	
October	10	(United States)	Jake Collier	Heavyweight	Released	
October	11	(United States)	Hannah Goldy	Women's Strawweight	Released	
October	17	(United States)	AJ Fletcher	Welterweight	Released	
October	17	(United States)	André Fialho	Welterweight	Released	
October	17	(New Zealand)	Shane Young	Featherweight	Released	
October	17	(Canada)	John Makdessi	Lightweight	Released	
October	17	(South Africa)	JP Buys	Bantamweight	Released	
October	17	(United States)	Kamuela Kirk	Lightweight	Released	
October	17	(United States)	Tucker Lutz	Featherweight	Released	
October	18	(Brazil)	Jennifer Maia	Women's Flyweight	End of contract	
October	25	(United States)	Ashley Yoder	Women's Flyweight	Released	
October	27	(United States)	Mike Breeden	Lightweight	Released	
October	31	(United States)	Mike Mathetha	Welterweight	Released	
November	3	(United States)	Jinh Yu Frey	Women's Strawweight	Released	
November	7	(Brazil)	Taila Santos	Women's Flyweight	Released	
November	8	(Japan)	Kanako Murata	Women's Strawweight	Released	
December	13	(United States)	Austin Lingo	Featherweight	Released	
December	13	(United States)	Johnny Muñoz Jr.	Bantamweight	Released	
December	13	(United States)	Nick Aguirre	Bantamweight	Released	
December	13	(United States)	Terrence Mitchell	Bantamweight	Released	
December	21	(United States)	Parker Porter	Heavyweight	Released	
December	21	(Australia)	Shannon Ross	Flyweight	Released	

== Debut UFC fighters ==
The following fighters fought their first UFC fight in 2023:

Month	Day	ISO	Fighter	Division	Event	Ref
January	14	(Brazil)	Mateus Mendonça	Bantamweight	UFC Fight Night 217	
January	14	(Poland)	Mateusz Rębecki	Lightweight	UFC Fight Night 217	
January	14	(United States)	Nick Aguirre	Lightweight	UFC Fight Night 217	
January	14	(United States)	Nick Fiore	Lightweight	UFC Fight Night 217	
January	14	(Brazil)	Claudio Ribeiro	Middleweight	UFC Fight Night 217	
January	21	(Brazil)	Brunno Ferreira	Middleweight	UFC 283	
January	21	(Peru)	Daniel Marcos	Bantamweight	UFC 283	
January	21	(Brazil)	Gabriel Bonfim	Welterweight	UFC 283	
January	21	(Brazil)	Ismael Bonfim	Lightweight	UFC 283	
January	21	(Brazil)	Luan Lacerda	Bantamweight	UFC 283	
January	21	(Brazil)	Melquizael Costa	Lightweight	UFC 283	
February	4	(India)	Anshul Jubli	Lightweight	UFC Fight Night 218	
February	4	(South Korea)	Choi Seung-guk	Flyweight	UFC Fight Night 218	
February	4	(Indonesia)	Jeka Saragih	Lightweight	UFC Fight Night 218	
February	4	(Mexico)	Jesús Santos Aguilar	Flyweight	UFC Fight Night 218	
February	4	(South Korea)	Lee Jeong-yeong	Featherweight	UFC Fight Night 218	
February	4	(South Korea)	Park Hyun-sung	Flyweight	UFC Fight Night 218	
February	4	(Japan)	Rinya Nakamura	Bantamweight	UFC Fight Night 218	
February	4	(Japan)	Toshiomi Kazama	Bantamweight	UFC Fight Night 218	
February	4	(China)	Yi Zha	Featherweight	UFC Fight Night 218	
February	4	(Japan)	Yusaku Kinoshita	Welterweight	UFC Fight Night 218	
February	11	(United States)	Blake Bilder	Featherweight	UFC 284	
February	11	(Brazil)	Elves Brener	Lightweight	UFC 284	
February	11	(Argentina)	Francisco Prado	Lightweight	UFC 284	
February	11	(Australia)	Jack Jenkins	Featherweight	UFC 284	
February	11	(Australia)	Shannon Ross	Flyweight	UFC 284	
February	18	(United States)	Clayton Carpenter	Flyweight	UFC Fight Night 219	
February	18	(United States)	Jamal Pogues	Heavyweight	UFC Fight Night 219	
February	18	(Russia)	Khusein Askhabov	Featherweight	UFC Fight Night 219	
February	18	(Azerbaijan)	Nazim Sadykhov	Lightweight	UFC Fight Night 219	
February	18	(Zimbabwe)	Themba Gorimbo	Welterweight	UFC Fight Night 219	
February	25	(United States)	Carl Deaton III	Lightweight	UFC Fight Night 220	
February	25	(Brazil)	Gabriella Fernandes	Women's Flyweight	UFC Fight Night 220	
February	25	(Tajikistan)	Nurullo Aliev	Lightweight	UFC Fight Night 220	
February	25	(United States)	Trevor Peek	Lightweight	UFC Fight Night 220	
February	25	(United States)	Victor Martinez	Lightweight	UFC Fight Night 220	
March	4	(United States)	Bo Nickal	Middleweight	UFC 285	
March	11	(United States)	Sedriques Dumas	Middleweight	UFC Fight Night 221	
March	11	(Brazil)	Vitor Petrino	Light Heavyweight	UFC Fight Night 221	
March	18	(Brazil)	Jafel Filho	Flyweight	UFC 286	
April	29	(Russia)	Irina Alekseeva	Women's Bantamweight	UFC on ESPN 45	
April	29	(Canada)	Jamey-Lyn Horth	Women's Flyweight	UFC on ESPN 45	
May	6	(Brazil)	Diego Lopes	Featherweight	UFC 288	
May	13	(Russia)	Ikram Aliskerov	Middleweight	UFC 288	
May	13	(Brazil)	Tainara Lisboa	Women's Bantamweight	UFC on ABC 4	
June	3	(Tajikistan)	Muhammad Naimov	Featherweight	UFC on ESPN 46	
June	10	(Australia)	Steve Erceg	Flyweight	UFC 289	
July	1	(Norway)	Ivana Petrović	Women's Flyweight	UFC on ESPN 48	
July	1	(Uzbekistan)	Nursulton Ruziboev	Welterweight	UFC on ESPN 48	
July	1	(United States)	Westin Wilson	Featherweight	UFC on ESPN 48	
July	8	(Mexico)	Édgar Cháirez	Flyweight	UFC 290	
July	22	(United States)	Bassil Hafez	Welterweight	UFC on ESPN 49	
August	5	(United States)	Dennis Buzukja	Featherweight	UFC on ESPN 50	
August	12	(United States)	Isaac Dulgarian	Featherweight	UFC on ESPN 51	
August	12	(United States)	Jose Johnson	Bantamweight	UFC on ESPN 51	
August	12	(Brazil)	Luana Santos	Women's Bantamweight	UFC on ESPN 51	
September	2	(Uzbekistan)	Bogdan Guskov	Light Heavyweight	UFC Fight Night 226	
September	2	(Brazil)	Jacqueline Cavalcanti	Women's Bantamweight	UFC Fight Night 226	
September	9	(Brazil)	Felipe dos Santos	Flyweight	UFC 293	
September	9	(New Zealand)	Kevin Jousset	Welterweight	UFC 293	
September	9	(Republic of Ireland)	Kiefer Crosbie	Welterweight	UFC 293	
September	23	(Mexico)	Montserrat Rendon	Women's Bantamweight	UFC Fight Night 228	
October	14	(United States)	Brendan Marotte	Lightweight	UFC Fight Night 230	
October	14	(England)	Melissa Mullins	Women's Bantamweight	UFC Fight Night 230	
October	14	(Brazil)	Ravena Oliveira	Women's Bantamweight	UFC Fight Night 230	
October	21	(United Arab Emirates)	Mohammad Yahya	Lightweight	UFC 294	
October	21	(Tajikistan)	Muin Gafurov	Bantamweight	UFC 294	
November	4	(Brazil)	Eduarda Moura	Women's Strawweight	UFC Fight Night 231	
November	4	(Brazil)	Kauê Fernandes	Lightweight	UFC Fight Night 231	
November	4	(Brazil)	Kaynan Kruschewsky	Lightweight	UFC Fight Night 231	
November	11	(Myanmar)	Joshua Van	Flyweight	UFC 295	
November	11	(Peru)	Kevin Borjas	Flyweight	UFC 295	
November	18	(Brazil)	Caio Machado	Heavyweight	UFC Fight Night 232	
November	18	(England)	Christian Leroy Duncan	Middleweight	UFC Fight Night 232	
November	18	(England)	Mick Parkin	Heavyweight	UFC Fight Night 232	
November	18	(Kyrgyzstan)	Myktybek Orolbai	Lightweight	UFC Fight Night 232	
November	18	(United States)	Payton Talbott	Bantamweight	UFC Fight Night 232	
November	18	(Brazil)	Rafael Estevam	Flyweight	UFC Fight Night 232	
December	2	(Brazil)	Rodolfo Bellato	Light Heavyweight	UFC on ESPN 52	
December	2	(United States)	Zachary Reese	Middleweight	UFC on ESPN 52	
December	9	(Brazil)	Rayanne dos Santos	Women's Strawweight	UFC Fight Night 233	
December	9	(Brazil)	Talita Alencar	Women's Strawweight	UFC Fight Night 233	
December	16	(Bahrain)	Shamil Gaziev	Heavyweight	UFC 296	

== Suspended fighters ==
The list below is based on fighters suspended either by (1) United States Anti-Doping Agency (USADA) or World Anti-Doping Agency (WADA) for violation of taking prohibited substances or non-analytical incidents, (2) by local commissions on misconduct during the fights or at event venues, or (3) by the UFC for reasons also stated below.

ISO	Name	Nickname	Division	From	Duration	Tested positive for / Info	By	Eligible to fight again	Ref.	Notes
Brazil	Carlos Felipe	Boi	Heavyweight	Oct 16, 2021	18 months	Boldenone and its metabolites	NSAC	Apr 16, 2023		$4,200 fine and $489 in prosecution fees
Brazil	Geraldo de Freitas	Spartan	Bantamweight	Jan 11, 2021	2 years	Exogenous administration of testosterone and/or its precursors	USADA	Jan 11, 2023		
Brazil	Raphael Pessoa	Bebezão	Heavyweight	Feb 9, 2021	2 years	7-Keto-DHEA and AOD-9064 Hydrochlorothiazide (HCTZ) and its metabolites Chlorothiazide and 4-amino-6-chloro-1,3-benzenedisulfonamide (ACB)	USADA	Feb 9, 2023		Second USADA violation. Results collected from out-of-competition on February 9, 2021, February 15, 2021, February 16, 2021, and March 4, 2021. Ressoa also evaded sample collection on January 25, 2021, and January 28, 2021.
United States	Ashlee Evans-Smith	Rebel Girl	Women's Bantamweight	Jan 3, 2022	14 months	dehydroepiandrosterone	USADA	March 3, 2023		
Brazil	Elizeu Zaleski dos Santos	Capoeira	Welterweight	March 14, 2022	1 year	Ostarine	USADA	March 14, 2023		
Egypt	Hamdy Abdelwahab	The Hammer	Heavyweight	July 30, 2022	2 years	Metenolone and its metabolite	USADA	July 30, 2024		
Brazil	Carlos Mota	Tizil	Flyweight	December 15, 2022	2 years	Meldonium	NSAC	March 14, 2023		Parted with UFC as of February 2023.
United States	Kyler Phillips	The Matrix	Bantamweight	January 22, 2023	6 months	Ostarine	NSAC	July 22, 2023		$407.50 in attorney fees.
United States	Darrius Flowers	Beast Mode	Welterweight	January 27, 2023	6 months	Ostarine	NSAC	July 27, 2023		$407.50 in attorney fees.
(Brazil)	Carlos Mota	Tizil	Flyweight	October 29, 2022	2 years	Meldonium	NSAC; USADA	October 29, 2024		$2,400 fine and $448.25 in prosecution fees. Parted with UFC as of February 2023.
(United States)	Jeff Molina	El Jefe	Flyweight	November 5, 2022	None	Linked to the investigation that began as a result of suspicious betting activity ahead of the Nov. 5 UFC fight between Darrick Minner	NYAC; NSAC; UFC	To be determined by NYAC and NSAC / temporary barred from UFC		
(Brazil)	José Henrique Souza	Canela	Welterweight	March 8, 2023	2 years	19-Norandrosterone and 19-Noretiocholanolone	USADA	March 8, 2025		Parted with UFC as of Spring 2023.
(United States)	Braxton Smith	The Beautiful Monster	Heavyweight	April 19, 2023	2 years	Exogenous testosterone and/or its precursors	USADA	April 19, 2025		Parted with UFC as of June 2023.
(United States)	Cortney Casey	Cast Iron	Women's Flyweight	June 1, 2023	4 months	BPC-157(she reported herself to USADA in June 2023 for taking the prohibited substance BPC-157 to treat a medical condition.)	USADA	October 1, 2023		
(United States)	Ovince Saint Preux	OSP	Light Heavyweight	June 17, 2023	6 months	Dehydroandrosterone (From tainted supplements)	USADA	December 17, 2023		
(Brazil)	Felipe Bunes	Felipinho	Flyweight	June 17, 2023	6 months	GW501516	NSAC	December 17, 2023		$326 in legal fees
(United States)	Walt Harris	The Big Ticket	Heavyweight	July 11, 2023	4 years	Drostanolone and its metabolites, exogenous testosterone, and Anastrozole	CSAD	July 11, 2027		
(Brazil)	Mayra Bueno Silva	Sheetara	Women's Bantamweight	July 15, 2023	4.5 months	Ritalinic acid	NSAC	November 29, 2023		$11,250 fine and $314.08 in prosecution fees.
(United States)	Daniel Rodriguez	D-Rod	Welterweight	July 28, 2023	6 months	Ostarine; LGD-4033 and its metabolites	NSAC	January 28, 2024		
(United States)	Miles Johns	Chopo	Bantamweight	September 23, 2023	4 1/2 months	Turinabol	NSAC	February 6, 2024		$2,300 fine $157.04 in prosecution fees.

== The Ultimate Fighter ==
The following The Ultimate Fighter seasons are scheduled for broadcast in 2023:

Season	Division	Winner	Runner-up	Ref
The Ultimate Fighter: Team McGregor vs. Team Chandler	Lightweight	Kurt Holobaugh	Austin Hubbard	
The Ultimate Fighter: Team McGregor vs. Team Chandler	Bantamweight	Brad Katona	Cody Gibson	

== Title fights ==
Title fights in 2023
Weight class				Method	Round	Time	Event	Notes
Flyweight	Brandon Moreno (ic)	def.	Deiveson Figueiredo (c)	TKO (doctor stoppage)	3	5:00	UFC 283	(Note: For the UFC Flyweight Championship.)
Light Heavyweight	Jamahal Hill	def.	Glover Teixeira	Decision (unanimous) (50–44, 50–44, 50–44)	5	5:00	UFC 283	(Note: For the vacant UFC Light Heavyweight Championship.)
Featherweight	Yair Rodríguez	def.	Josh Emmett	Submission (triangle choke)	2	4:19	UFC 284	(Note: For the interim UFC Featherweight Championship.)
Lightweight	Islam Makhachev (c)	def.	Alexander Volkanovski	Decision (unanimous) (48–47, 48–47, 49–46)	5	5:00	UFC 284	(Note: For the UFC Lightweight Championship.)
Women's Flyweight	Alexa Grasso	def.	Valentina Shevchenko (c)	Submission (face crank)	4	4:34	UFC 285	(Note: For the UFC Women's Flyweight Championship.)
Heavyweight	Jon Jones	def.	Ciryl Gane	Submission (guillotine choke)	1	2:04	UFC 285	(Note: For the vacant UFC Heavyweight Championship.)
Welterweight	Leon Edwards (c)	def.	Kamaru Usman	Decision (majority) (48–46, 48–46, 47–47)	5	5:00	UFC 286	(Note: For the UFC Welterweight Championship.)
Middleweight	Israel Adesanya	def.	Alex Pereira (c)	KO (punches)	2	4:21	UFC 287	(Note: For the UFC Middleweight Championship.)
Bantamweight	Aljamain Sterling (c)	def.	Henry Cejudo	Decision (split) (47–48, 48–47, 48–47)	5	5:00	UFC 288	(Note: For the UFC Bantamweight Championship.)
Women's Bantamweight	Amanda Nunes (c)	def.	Irene Aldana	Decision (unanimous) (50–44, 50–44, 50–43)	5	5:00	UFC 289	(Note: For the UFC Women's Bantamweight Championship.)
Flyweight	Alexandre Pantoja	def.	Brandon Moreno (c)	Decision (split) (46–49, 48–47, 48–47)	5	5:00	UFC 290	(Note: For the UFC Flyweight Championship.)
Featherweight	Alexander Volkanovski (c)	def.	Yair Rodríguez (ic)	TKO (punches)	3	4:19	UFC 290	(Note: For the UFC Featherweight Championship.)
Women's Strawweight	Zhang Weili (c)	def.	Amanda Lemos	Decision (unanimous) (50–43, 50–44, 49–45)	5	5:00	UFC 292	(Note: For the UFC Women's Strawweight Championship.)
Bantamweight	Sean O'Malley	def.	Aljamain Sterling (c)	TKO (punches)	2	0:51	UFC 292	(Note: For the UFC Bantamweight Championship.)
Middleweight	Sean Strickland	def.	Israel Adesanya (c)	Decision (unanimous) (49–46, 49–46, 49–46)	5	5:00	UFC 293	(Note: For the UFC Middleweight Championship.)
Women's Flyweight	Alexa Grasso (c)	vs.	Valentina Shevchenko	Draw (split) (48–47, 47–48, 47–47)	5	5:00	UFC Fight Night 227	(Note: For the UFC Women's Flyweight Championship.)
Lightweight	Islam Makhachev (c)	def.	Alexander Volkanovski	KO (head kick and punches)	1	3:06	UFC 294	(Note: For the UFC Lightweight Championship.)
Heavyweight	Tom Aspinall	def.	Sergei Pavlovich	KO (punches)	1	1:09	UFC 295	(Note: For the interim UFC Heavyweight Championship.)
Light Heavyweight	Alex Pereira	def.	Jiří Procházka	TKO (elbows)	2	4:08	UFC 295	(Note: For the vacant UFC Light Heavyweight Championship.)
Flyweight	Alexandre Pantoja (c)	def.	Brandon Royval	Decision (unanimous) (50–45, 50–45, 49–46)	5	5:00	UFC 296	(Note: For the UFC Flyweight Championship.)
Welterweight	Leon Edwards (c)	def.	Colby Covington	Decision (unanimous) (49–46, 49–46, 49–46)	5	5:00	UFC 296	(Note: For the UFC Welterweight Championship.)

== Events list ==
=== Past events ===
#	Event	Date	Venue	City	Country	Atten.	Ref.	Fight of the Night			Performance of the Night		Bonus	Ref.
673	UFC 296: Edwards vs. Covington	Dec 16, 2023	T-Mobile Arena	Las Vegas, Nevada	United States	19,039		Irene Aldana	vs.	Karol Rosa	Josh Emmett	Ariane Lipski	$50,000	
673	UFC 296: Edwards vs. Covington	Dec 16, 2023	T-Mobile Arena	Las Vegas, Nevada	United States	19,039		Irene Aldana	vs.	Karol Rosa	Shamil Gaziev	—N/a	$50,000	
673	UFC Fight Night: Song vs. Gutiérrez	Dec 9, 2023	UFC Apex	Las Vegas, Nevada	United States	—N/a		—N/a			Khalil Rountree Jr.	Nasrat Haqparast	$50,000	
673	UFC Fight Night: Song vs. Gutiérrez	Dec 9, 2023	UFC Apex	Las Vegas, Nevada	United States	—N/a		—N/a			Tim Elliott	Park Hyun-sung	$50,000	
672	UFC on ESPN: Dariush vs. Tsaryukan	Dec 2, 2023	Moody Center	Austin, Texas	United States	14,485		Rodolfo Bellato	vs.	Ihor Potieria	Arman Tsarukyan	Jalin Turner	$50,000	
672	UFC on ESPN: Dariush vs. Tsaryukan	Dec 2, 2023	Moody Center	Austin, Texas	United States	14,485		Rodolfo Bellato	vs.	Ihor Potieria	Sean Brady	Dustin Stoltzfus	$50,000	
672	UFC on ESPN: Dariush vs. Tsaryukan	Dec 2, 2023	Moody Center	Austin, Texas	United States	14,485		Rodolfo Bellato	vs.	Ihor Potieria	Miesha Tate	Cody Brundage	$50,000	
672	UFC on ESPN: Dariush vs. Tsaryukan	Dec 2, 2023	Moody Center	Austin, Texas	United States	14,485		Rodolfo Bellato	vs.	Ihor Potieria	Drakkar Klose	Jared Gooden	$50,000	
671	UFC Fight Night: Allen vs. Craig	Nov 18, 2023	UFC Apex	Las Vegas, Nevada	United States	—N/a		—N/a			Brendan Allen	Amanda Ribas	$50,000	.
671	UFC Fight Night: Allen vs. Craig	Nov 18, 2023	UFC Apex	Las Vegas, Nevada	United States	—N/a		—N/a			Joanderson Brito	Jeka Saragih	$50,000	.
670	UFC 295: Procházka vs. Pereira	Nov 11, 2023	Madison Square Garden	New York City	United States	19,039		Nazim Sadykhov	vs.	Viacheslav Borshchev	Alex Pereira	Tom Aspinall	$50,000	
670	UFC 295: Procházka vs. Pereira	Nov 11, 2023	Madison Square Garden	New York City	United States	19,039		Nazim Sadykhov	vs.	Viacheslav Borshchev	Jéssica Andrade	Benoît Saint-Denis	$50,000	
670	UFC 295: Procházka vs. Pereira	Nov 11, 2023	Madison Square Garden	New York City	United States	19,039		Nazim Sadykhov	vs.	Viacheslav Borshchev	Diego Lopes	—N/a	$50,000	
669	UFC Fight Night: Almeida vs. Lewis	Nov 4, 2023	Ginásio do Ibirapuera	São Paulo	Brazil	10,772		Nicolas Dalby	vs.	Gabriel Bonfim	Elves Brener	Vitor Petrino	$50,000	
668	UFC 294: Makhachev vs. Volkanovski 2	Oct 21, 2023	Etihad Arena	Abu Dhabi	United Arab Emirates	—N/a		—N/a			Islam Makhachev	Ikram Aliskerov	$50,000	
668	UFC 294: Makhachev vs. Volkanovski 2	Oct 21, 2023	Etihad Arena	Abu Dhabi	United Arab Emirates	—N/a		—N/a			Said Nurmagomedov	Muhammad Mokaev	$50,000	
667	UFC Fight Night: Yusuff vs. Barboza	Oct 14, 2023	UFC Apex	Las Vegas, Nevada	United States	—N/a		Sodiq Yusuff	vs.	Edson Barboza	Jonathan Martinez	Michel Pereira	$50,000	
666	UFC Fight Night: Dawson vs. Green	Oct 7, 2023	UFC Apex	Las Vegas, Nevada	United States	—N/a		—N/a			Bobby Green	Joe Pyfer	$50,000	
666	UFC Fight Night: Dawson vs. Green	Oct 7, 2023	UFC Apex	Las Vegas, Nevada	United States	—N/a		—N/a			Drew Dober	Nate Maness	$50,000	
665	UFC Fight Night: Fiziev vs. Gamrot	Sep 23, 2023	UFC Apex	Las Vegas, Nevada	United States	—N/a		Tim Means	vs.	André Fialho	Marina Rodriguez	Charles Jourdain	$50,000	
664	UFC Fight Night: Grasso vs. Shevchenko 2	Sep 16, 2023	T-Mobile Arena	Las Vegas, Nevada	United States	18,766		—N/a			Raul Rosas Jr.	Daniel Zellhuber	$50,000	
664	UFC Fight Night: Grasso vs. Shevchenko 2	Sep 16, 2023	T-Mobile Arena	Las Vegas, Nevada	United States	18,766		—N/a			Lupita Godinez	Roman Kopylov	$50,000	
664	UFC Fight Night: Grasso vs. Shevchenko 2	Sep 16, 2023	T-Mobile Arena	Las Vegas, Nevada	United States	18,766		—N/a			Charlie Campbell	—N/a	$50,000	
663	UFC 293: Adesanya vs. Strickland	Sep 10, 2023	Qudos Bank Arena	Sydney	Australia	18,168		Manel Kape	vs.	Felipe dos Santos	Sean Strickland	Justin Tafa	$50,000	
662	UFC Fight Night: Gane vs. Spivak	Sep 2, 2023	Accor Arena	Paris	France	15,610		Benoît Saint-Denis	vs.	Thiago Moisés	Ciryl Gane	Morgan Charrière	$50,000	
661	UFC Fight Night: Holloway vs. The Korean Zombie	Aug 26, 2023	Singapore Indoor Stadium	Kallang	Singapore	10,263		Max Holloway	vs.	Jung Chan-sung	Junior Tafa	Michał Oleksiejczuk	$50,000	
660	UFC 292: Sterling vs. O'Malley	Aug 19, 2023	TD Garden	Boston, Massachusetts	United States	18,293		Brad Katona	vs.	Cody Gibson	Sean O'Malley	Zhang Weili	$50,000	
659	UFC on ESPN: Luque vs. dos Anjos	Aug 12, 2023	UFC Apex	Las Vegas, Nevada	United States	—N/a		—N/a			Khalil Rountree Jr.	Iasmin Lucindo	$50,000	
659	UFC on ESPN: Luque vs. dos Anjos	Aug 12, 2023	UFC Apex	Las Vegas, Nevada	United States	—N/a		—N/a			Marcus McGhee	Da'Mon Blackshear	$50,000	
658	UFC on ESPN: Sandhagen vs. Font	Aug 5, 2023	Bridgestone Arena	Nashville, Tennessee	United States	17,792		—N/a			Tatiana Suarez	Dustin Jacoby	$50,000	
658	UFC on ESPN: Sandhagen vs. Font	Aug 5, 2023	Bridgestone Arena	Nashville, Tennessee	United States	17,792		—N/a			Diego Lopes	Carlston Harris	$50,000	
658	UFC on ESPN: Sandhagen vs. Font	Aug 5, 2023	Bridgestone Arena	Nashville, Tennessee	United States	17,792		—N/a			Assu Almabayev	—N/a	$50,000	
657	UFC 291: Poirier vs. Gaethje 2	Jul 29, 2023	Delta Center	Salt Lake City, Utah	United States	18,467		—N/a			Justin Gaethje	Derrick Lewis	$50,000	
657	UFC 291: Poirier vs. Gaethje 2	Jul 29, 2023	Delta Center	Salt Lake City, Utah	United States	18,467		—N/a			Bobby Green	Kevin Holland	$50,000	
656	UFC Fight Night: Aspinall vs. Tybura	Jul 22, 2023	The O2 Arena	London, England	United Kingdom	15,078		Danny Roberts	vs.	Jonny Parsons	Tom Aspinall	Paul Craig	$50,000	
655	UFC on ESPN: Holm vs. Bueno Silva	Jul 15, 2023	UFC Apex	Las Vegas, Nevada	United States	—N/a		Jack Della Maddalena	vs.	Bassil Hafez	Mayra Bueno Silva	Francisco Prado	$50,000	
654	UFC 290: Volkanovski vs. Rodríguez	Jul 8, 2023	T-Mobile Arena	Las Vegas, Nevada	United States	19,204		Brandon Moreno	vs.	Alexandre Pantoja	Dricus du Plessis	Denise Gomes	$50,000	
653	UFC on ESPN: Strickland vs. Magomedov	Jul 1, 2023	UFC Apex	Las Vegas, Nevada	United States	—N/a		Guram Kutateladze	vs.	Elves Brenner	Sean Strickland	Nursulton Ruziboev	$50,000	
652	UFC on ABC: Emmett vs. Topuria	Jun 24, 2023	VyStar Veterans Memorial Arena	Jacksonville, Florida	United States	14,110		Josh Emmett	vs.	Ilia Topuria	Maycee Barber	David Onama	$50,000	
651	UFC on ESPN: Vettori vs. Cannonier	Jun 17, 2023	UFC Apex	Las Vegas, Nevada	United States	—N/a		Marvin Vettori	vs.	Jared Cannonier	Manuel Torres	Alessandro Costa	$50,000	
650	UFC 289: Nunes vs. Aldana	Jun 10, 2023	Rogers Arena	Vancouver, British Columbia	Canada	17,628		Marc-André Barriault	vs.	Eryk Anders	Charles Oliveira	Mike Malott	$50,000	
650	UFC 289: Nunes vs. Aldana	Jun 10, 2023	Rogers Arena	Vancouver, British Columbia	Canada	17,628		Marc-André Barriault	vs.	Eryk Anders	Steve Erceg	—N/a	$50,000	
649	UFC on ESPN: Kara-France vs. Albazi	Jun 3, 2023	UFC Apex	Las Vegas, Nevada	United States	—N/a		Alex Caceres	vs.	Daniel Pineda	Jim Miller	Muhammadjon Naimov	$50,000	
648	UFC Fight Night: Dern vs. Hill	May 20, 2023	UFC Apex	Las Vegas, Nevada	United States	—N/a		Mackenzie Dern	vs.	Angela Hill	Carlos Diego Ferreira	Viacheslav Borschev	$50,000	
647	UFC on ABC: Rozenstruik vs. Almeida	May 13, 2023	Spectrum Center	Charlotte, North Carolina	United States	18,712		—N/a			Jailton Almeida	Ian Machado Garry	$50,000	
647	UFC on ABC: Rozenstruik vs. Almeida	May 13, 2023	Spectrum Center	Charlotte, North Carolina	United States	18,712		—N/a			Carlos Ulberg	Bryan Battle	$50,000	
647	UFC on ABC: Rozenstruik vs. Almeida	May 13, 2023	Spectrum Center	Charlotte, North Carolina	United States	18,712		—N/a			Matt Brown	—N/a	$50,000	
646	UFC 288: Sterling vs. Cejudo	May 6, 2023	Prudential Center	Newark, New Jersey	United States	17,559		Movsar Evloev	vs.	Diego Lopes	Yan Xiaonan	Matt Frevola	$50,000	
645	UFC on ESPN: Song vs. Simón	Apr 29, 2023	UFC Apex	Las Vegas, Nevada	United States	—N/a		—N/a			Song Yadong	Caio Borralho	$50,000	
645	UFC on ESPN: Song vs. Simón	Apr 29, 2023	UFC Apex	Las Vegas, Nevada	United States	—N/a		—N/a			Rodolfo Vieira	Marcus McGhee	$50,000	
644	UFC Fight Night: Pavlovich vs. Blaydes	Apr 22, 2023	UFC Apex	Las Vegas, Nevada	United States	—N/a		—N/a			Sergei Pavlovich	Bruno Silva	$50,000	
644	UFC Fight Night: Pavlovich vs. Blaydes	Apr 22, 2023	UFC Apex	Las Vegas, Nevada	United States	—N/a		—N/a			Christos Giagos	Montel Jackson	$50,000	
643	UFC on ESPN: Holloway vs. Allen	Apr 15, 2023	T-Mobile Center	Kansas City, Missouri	United States	16,234		Bill Algeo	vs.	T.J. Brown	Edson Barboza	Brandon Royval	$50,000	
643	UFC on ESPN: Holloway vs. Allen	Apr 15, 2023	T-Mobile Center	Kansas City, Missouri	United States	16,234		Bill Algeo	vs.	T.J. Brown	Gillian Robertson	—N/a	$50,000	
642	UFC 287: Pereira vs. Adesanya 2	Apr 8, 2023	Kaseya Center	Miami, Florida	United States	19,032		Chris Curtis	vs.	Kelvin Gastelum	Israel Adesanya	Rob Font	$50,000	
641	UFC on ESPN: Vera vs. Sandhagen	Mar 25, 2023	AT&T Center	San Antonio, Texas	United States	16,076		C.J. Vergara	vs.	Daniel da Silva	Nate Landwehr	Daniel Pineda	$50,000	
640	UFC 286: Edwards vs. Usman 3	Mar 18, 2023	The O_{2} Arena	London, England	United Kingdom	17,588		Justin Gaethje	vs.	Rafael Fiziev	Gunnar Nelson	Jake Hadley	$50,000	
639	UFC Fight Night: Yan vs. Dvalishvili	Mar 11, 2023	The Theater at Virgin Hotels	Las Vegas, Nevada	United States	—N/a		Vitor Petrino	vs.	Anton Turkalj	Davey Grant	Bruno Gustavo da Silva	$50,000	
638	UFC 285: Jones vs. Gane	Mar 4, 2023	T-Mobile Arena	Las Vegas, Nevada	United States	19,471		Geoff Neal	vs.	Shavkat Rakhmonov	Jon Jones	Alexa Grasso	$50,000	
638	UFC 285: Jones vs. Gane	Mar 4, 2023	T-Mobile Arena	Las Vegas, Nevada	United States	19,471		Geoff Neal	vs.	Shavkat Rakhmonov	Bo Nickal	—N/a	$50,000	
637	UFC Fight Night: Muniz vs. Allen	Feb 25, 2023	UFC Apex	Las Vegas, Nevada	United States	—N/a		—N/a			Brendan Allen	Tatiana Suarez	$50,000	
637	UFC Fight Night: Muniz vs. Allen	Feb 25, 2023	UFC Apex	Las Vegas, Nevada	United States	—N/a		—N/a			Mike Malott	Trevor Peek	$50,000	
637	UFC Fight Night: Muniz vs. Allen	Feb 25, 2023	UFC Apex	Las Vegas, Nevada	United States	—N/a		—N/a			Jordan Leavitt	Joe Solecki	$50,000	
636	UFC Fight Night: Andrade vs. Blanchfield	Feb 18, 2023	UFC Apex	Las Vegas, Nevada	United States	—N/a		Nazim Sadykhov	vs.	Evan Elder	Erin Blanchfield	Mayra Bueno Silva	$50,000	
635	UFC 284: Makhachev vs. Volkanovski	Feb 12, 2023	RAC Arena	Perth, Western Australia	Australia	14,124		Islam Makhachev	vs.	Alexander Volkanovski	Yair Rodríguez	Jack Della Maddalena	$50,000	
634	UFC Fight Night: Lewis vs. Spivak	Feb 4, 2023	UFC Apex	Las Vegas, Nevada	United States	—N/a		—N/a			Sergey Spivak	Anshul Jubli	$50,000	
634	UFC Fight Night: Lewis vs. Spivak	Feb 4, 2023	UFC Apex	Las Vegas, Nevada	United States	—N/a		—N/a			Rinya Nakamura	Tatsuro Taira	$50,000	
633	UFC 283: Teixeira vs. Hill	Jan 21, 2023	Jeunesse Arena	Rio de Janeiro	Brazil	13,604		Glover Teixeira	vs.	Jamahal Hill	Jailton Almeida	Ismael Bonfim	$50,000	
632	UFC Fight Night: Strickland vs. Imavov	Jan 14, 2023	UFC Apex	Las Vegas, Nevada	United States	—N/a		—N/a			Dan Ige	Roman Kopylov	$50,000	
632	UFC Fight Night: Strickland vs. Imavov	Jan 14, 2023	UFC Apex	Las Vegas, Nevada	United States	—N/a		—N/a			Umar Nurmagomedov	Allan Nascimento	$50,000	

== See also ==
- List of UFC champions
- List of UFC events
- List of current UFC fighters
- 2023 in Bellator MMA
- 2023 in Professional Fighters League
- 2023 in ONE Championship
- 2023 in Absolute Championship Akhmat
- 2023 in Konfrontacja Sztuk Walki
- 2023 in Rizin Fighting Federation
- 2023 in LUX Fight League
- 2023 in Brave Combat Federation
- 2023 in Legacy Fighting Alliance
- 2023 in Road FC
