= Shavkat Rakhmonov =

Kazakh mixed martial artist (born 1994)

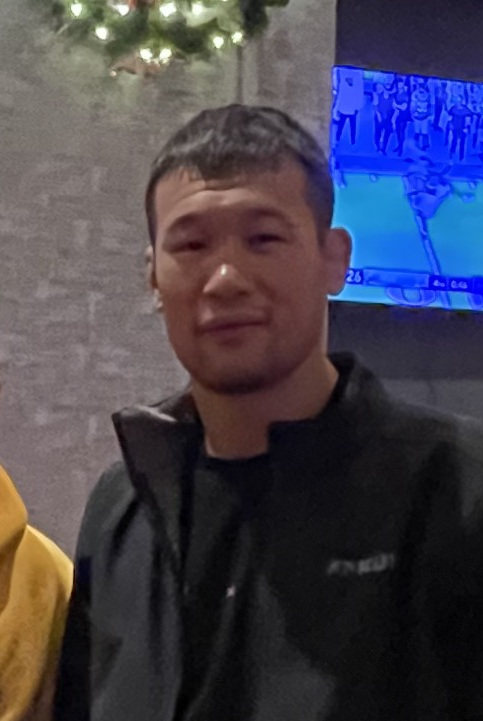
- Rakhmonov in 2024
- Born: Shavkat Bakhtibaevich Rakhmonov; October 23, 1994 (age 31); Shoʻrchi, Surxondaryo Region, Uzbekistan
- Native name: Шавкат Бақтыбайұлы Рахмонов
- Nickname: Nomad
- Nationality: Kazakh
- Height: 6 ft 1 in (185 cm)
- Weight: 170 lb (77 kg; 12 st 2 lb)
- Division: Welterweight
- Reach: 77 in (196 cm)
- Fighting out of: Kokshetau, Kazakhstan
- Team: DAR Pro Team; Kill Cliff FC (2021–present)
- Rank: Master of Sport in Combat Sambo; Master of Sport in MMA
- Years active: 2014–present

Mixed martial arts record
- Total: 19
- Wins: 19
- By knockout: 8
- By submission: 10
- By decision: 1
- Losses: 0

Amateur record
- Total: 13
- Wins: 11
- By knockout: 1
- By submission: 1
- Losses: 2
- By decision: 2

Other information
- Mixed martial arts record from Sherdog

Shavkat Baqtibaiuly Rakhmonov (Kazakh: Шавкат Бақтыбайұлы Рахмонов, [ʂɑfˈkɑt bɑqtʰɯˈbɑjo̙ɫɯ rɑhˈmonɯf], Russian: Шавкат Бахтибаевич Рахмонов; born October 23, 1994) is a Kazakh professional mixed martial artist. He currently competes in the Welterweight division of the Ultimate Fighting Championship (UFC). A professional since 2014, Rakhmonov is also a former M-1 Global Welterweight Champion.

== Background ==
Rakhmonov was born on October 23, 1994, in the city of Shoʻrchi, Uzbekistan, into a Kazakh family. His father is a Kazakh of the Altynbay clan and his mother is a Kazakh of the Konyrat tribe. Rakhmonov is from the Altynbai clan of Alimuly tribe of the Junior Zhuz.

== Mixed martial arts career ==
=== Early career ===
As an amateur, Rakhmonov won the WMMAA World and Asian Championships titles.

Rakhmonov's professional career began in October 2014, debuting with a first round triangle choke victory against Adam Tsurov at M-1 Challenge 52. He would continue fighting mainly under the M-1 banner, with seven of his professional fights taking place with promotion, with the remaining five wins coming in his home country's own MMA organization, Kazakhstan Mixed Martial Arts Federation (KZMMAF). He would alternate back-and-forth between the two organizations, earning his first shot at title as a pro against Faridun Odilov for the KZMMAF welterweight belt. He won the title by third-round TKO.

As an 18-year-old, Rakhmonov became a world champion in amateur MMA for WMMAA (World MMA Association) in 2013.

In 2014 he became WMMAA's Asian MMA champion, and in the same year he finished as runner-up in WMMAA's World Championship to Gadzhimurad Khiramagomedov. In 2015 Rakhmonov again finished as a runner-up in WMMAA’s World Championship to Khiramagomedov. Gadzhimurad Khiramagomedov is the only person to defeat Rakhmonov on two occasions while competing in a MMA fight.

Rakhmonov defended his belt in his next fight at Battle of Nomads 11 against Rinat Sayakbaev in December 2018, returning to M-1 at the start of the new year, facing Daniil Prikaza at M-1 Challenge 101 for the vacant M-1 Welterweight Championship. With a second-round TKO stoppage, the Kazakhstani secured his second belt. During this period, Rakhmonov received the nickname “Nomad”.

In his last appearance on the regional scene, Rakhmonov defended his M-1 welterweight title with a first-round stoppage of Tiago Varejão at M-1 Challenge 102.

=== Ultimate Fighting Championship ===
Rakhmonov was the first Kazakh fighter to sign a contract with the UFC. Rakhmonov was scheduled to face Bartosz Fabiński on March 21, 2020, at UFC Fight Night: Woodley vs. Edwards. However, due to the COVID-19 pandemic the event was cancelled.

Rakhmonov was expected to face Ramazan Emeev on July 26, 2020, at UFC on ESPN 14. However, in early July, it was reported that Rakhmonov was forced to pull out due to injury and was replaced by Niklas Stolze.

Rakhmonov was scheduled to fight Elizeu Zaleski dos Santos on October 24, 2020, at UFC 254. However, Zaleski pulled out due to injury and was replaced by Alex Oliveira. At the weigh-ins, Oliveira weighed in at 173 pounds, two pounds over the welterweight non-title fight limit. As a result, the bout proceeded as a catchweight and he was fined 20% of his purse, which went to Rakhmonov. Rakhmonov won the fight via guillotine choke submission in the first round.

Rakhmonov faced Michel Prazeres at UFC Fight Night 190 on June 26, 2021. He won the bout via rear-naked choke submission in the second round.

Rakhmonov faced Carlston Harris on February 5, 2022, at UFC Fight Night 200. He won the fight via knockout in round one. This fight earned him the Performance of the Night award.

As the first bout of his new five-fight contract, Rakhmonov faced Neil Magny on June 25, 2022, at UFC on ESPN 38. He won the fight via a guillotine choke submission in the second round. This win earned him the Performance of the Night bonus award.

Rakhmonov was scheduled to face Geoff Neal on January 14, 2023, at UFC Fight Night 217. However, Neal pulled out due to an undisclosed injury. The pair was rescheduled for UFC 285 on March 4, 2023. At the weigh-ins, Neal weighed in at 175 pounds, 4 pounds over the non-title fight welterweight limit. As a result, the bout proceeded as a catchweight and Neal was fined 30% of his fight purse, which went to Rakhmonov. He won the fight via a rear-naked choke submission in the third round. This fight earned Rakhmonov his first Fight of the Night award.

Rakhmonov was scheduled to face Kelvin Gastelum on September 16, 2023, at UFC Fight Night 227. However, Gastelum withdrew in late July after sustaining a facial fracture.

Rakhmonov faced Stephen Thompson on December 16, 2023, at UFC 296. He won via a rear-naked choke submission with just four seconds remaining in the second round, making him the first person to ever finish Thompson by submission in his MMA career.

Rakhmonov was scheduled to compete for the UFC Welterweight Championship against Belal Muhammad on December 7, 2024 at UFC 310. However, due to a bone infection in his foot, Muhammad was forced to withdraw. Rakhmonov instead faced Ian Machado Garry in a 5-round title eliminator. Rakhmonov won the fight by unanimous decision in his first MMA decision victory.

Due to injury, Rakhmonov was unable to compete for the championship against then champion Belal Muhammad at UFC 315 but stated that he would be offered a title shot later in the year after recovering. In January 2026, it was reported that Rakhmonov's knee injury would keep him out of action for nine-to-ten months. He was removed from #2 in the rankings as a result of this injury.

== Championships and accomplishments ==
- World Mixed Martial Arts Association (WMMAA)
  - (gold) World Championship Welterweight (2013)
  - (gold) Asian Championship Welterweight (2014)
  - (silver) World Championship Welterweight (2014)
  - (silver) World Championship Welterweight (2015)
- Ultimate Fighting Championship
  - Performance of the Night (Two times) vs. Carlston Harris and Neil Magny
  - Fight of the Night (One time) vs. Geoff Neal
  - Longest finish streak in UFC Welterweight division history (6)
  - UFC Honors Awards
    - 2023: President's Choice Fight of the Year Nominee vs. Geoff Neal
  - UFC.com Awards
    - 2023: Ranked #2 Submission of the Year, Ranked #4 Fight of the Year & Ranked #10 Upset of the Year vs. Geoff Neal
- M-1 Global
  - M-1 Welterweight Championship (One time)
    - One successful title defense
- Kazakhstan Mixed Martial Arts Federation
  - KZMMAF Welterweight Championship (One time)
    - One successful title defense
- MMA Fighting
  - 2023 First Team MMA All-Star
- Bleacher Report
  - 2023 #4 Ranked UFC Fight of the Year vs. Geoff Neal at UFC 285

== Personal life ==
Rakhmonov's younger sister, Sora Rakhmonova, is also a mixed martial artist.

On July 27, 2025, Rakhmonov's wife and son were involved in a car accident which resulted in the death of two women (friends of his wife). Rakhmonov's wife and son were hospitalized following the wreck and later released.

Rakhmonov is a Muslim.

== Mixed martial arts record ==
Professional record breakdown
19 matches	19 wins	0 losses
By knockout	8	0
By submission	10	0
By decision	1	0

Res.	Record	Opponent	Method	Event	Date	Round	Time	Location	Notes
Win	19–0	Ian Machado Garry	Decision (unanimous)	UFC 310	December 7, 2024	5	5:00	Las Vegas, Nevada, United States	UFC Welterweight title eliminator.
Win	18–0	Stephen Thompson	Submission (rear-naked choke)	UFC 296	December 16, 2023	2	4:56	Las Vegas, Nevada, United States	
Win	17–0	Geoff Neal	Submission (rear-naked choke)	UFC 285	March 4, 2023	3	4:17	Las Vegas, Nevada, United States	Catchweight (175 lb) bout; Neal missed weight. Fight of the Night.
Win	16–0	Neil Magny	Submission (guillotine choke)	UFC on ESPN: Tsarukyan vs. Gamrot	June 25, 2022	2	4:58	Las Vegas, Nevada, United States	Performance of the Night.
Win	15–0	Carlston Harris	KO (spinning hook kick and punches)	UFC Fight Night: Hermansson vs. Strickland	February 5, 2022	1	4:10	Las Vegas, Nevada, United States	Performance of the Night.
Win	14–0	Michel Prazeres	Submission (rear-naked choke)	UFC Fight Night: Gane vs. Volkov	June 26, 2021	2	2:10	Las Vegas, Nevada, United States	
Win	13–0	Alex Oliveira	Submission (guillotine choke)	UFC 254	October 24, 2020	1	4:40	Abu Dhabi, United Arab Emirates	Catchweight (173 lb) bout; Oliveira missed weight.
Win	12–0	Tiago Varejão	TKO (punches)	M-1 Challenge 102	June 28, 2019	1	4:50	Nur-Sultan, Kazakhstan	Defended the M-1 Global Welterweight Championship.
Win	11–0	Daniil Prikaza	TKO (punches)	M-1 Challenge 101	March 30, 2019	2	2:20	Almaty, Kazakhstan	Won the vacant M-1 Global Welterweight Championship.
Win	10–0	Rinat Sayakbaev	TKO (retirement)	Kazakhstan MMA Federation: Battle of Nomads 11	December 8, 2018	1	5:00	Taldıqorğan, Kazakhstan	Defended the KZMMAF Welterweight Championship.
Win	9–0	Faridun Odilov	TKO (punches)	Kazakhstan MMA Federation: Battle of Nomads 10	May 12, 2018	3	3:03	Astana, Kazakhstan	Won the KZMMAF Welterweight Championship.
Win	8–0	Levan Solodovnik	Submission (triangle choke)	M-1 Challenge 87	February 9, 2018	2	4:42	Saint Petersburg, Russia	
Win	7–0	Park Jun-yong	Submission (rear-naked choke)	Kazakhstan MMA Federation: Battle of Nomads 9	August 7, 2016	2	1:51	Hwasun, South Korea	Catchweight (176 lb) bout.
Win	6–0	Marcelo Brito	KO (punch to the body)	M-1 Challenge 67	June 4, 2016	1	1:37	Baku, Azerbaijan	
Win	5–0	Adil Boranbayev	Submission (rear-naked choke)	Kazakhstan MMA Federation: Battle of Nomads 7	April 30, 2016	2	4:51	Astana, Kazakhstan	
Win	4–0	Michał Wiencek	Submission (guillotine choke)	M-1 Challenge 59	July 3, 2015	1	0:49	Astana, Kazakhstan	
Win	3–0	Bartosz Chyrek	KO (punches)	M-1 Challenge 57	May 2, 2015	1	2:51	Orenburg, Russia	
Win	2–0	Marcus Vinicios	TKO (punches)	Kazakhstan MMA Federation: Battle of Nomads 2	November 30, 2014	1	4:58	Almaty, Kazakhstan	
Win	1–0	Adam Tsurov	Submission (triangle choke)	M-1 Challenge 52	October 17, 2014	1	3:56	Nazran, Russia	Welterweight debut.

== See also ==
- List of current UFC fighters
- List of male mixed martial artists
- List of undefeated mixed martial artists
