= UFC on ABC: Emmett vs. Topuria =

Mixed martial arts event in 2023

- The poster for UFC on ABC: Emmett vs. Topuria
- Promotion: Ultimate Fighting Championship
- Date: June 24, 2023
- Venue: VyStar Veterans Memorial Arena
- City: Jacksonville, Florida, United States
- Attendance: 14,101
- Total gate: $1,491,128.63.

Event chronology
UFC on ESPN: Vettori vs. Cannonier	UFC on ABC: Emmett vs. Topuria	UFC on ESPN: Strickland vs. Magomedov

UFC on ABC: Emmett vs. Topuria (also known as UFC on ABC 5) was a mixed martial arts event produced by the Ultimate Fighting Championship that took place on June 24, 2023 at the VyStar Veterans Memorial Arena in Jacksonville, Florida, United States.

== Background ==
The event marked the promotion's sixth visit to Jacksonville and first since UFC 273 in April 2022.

A featherweight bout between former interim UFC Featherweight Championship challenger Josh Emmett and Ilia Topuria was originally expected to serve as the main event of UFC on ESPN: Vettori vs. Cannonier one week earlier, but it was rescheduled to headline this event instead.

Former LFA Middleweight Champion Gregory Rodrigues and Dennis Tiuliulin were expected to meet in a middleweight bout at the main card. However, the bout was postponed to UFC 292 due to an undisclosed withdrawal of Tiuliulin.

A lightweight bout between Trevor Peek and Victor Martinez was expected to take place at the event. However, Martinez withdrew for unknown reasons and was replaced by Chepe Mariscal.

Punahele Soriano was expected to face Sedriques Dumas in a middleweight bout at the event. However, on June 15 it was announced that Soriano pulled out due to undisclosed reasons and was replaced by Cody Brundage.

At the weigh-ins, Loik Radzhabov and Kleydson Rodrigues missed weight. Radzhabov weighed in at 157.25 pounds and Rodrigues weighed in at 129 pounds, one and quarter pounds over the lightweight and three pounds over the flyweight non-title fights limit respectively. Radzhabov's bout proceeded at catchweight and he was fined 20 percent of his purse, which went to his opponent Mateusz Rębecki. As a result of the weight miss, Rodrigues's bout with Tatsuro Taira was cancelled.

== Results ==
Main Card (ABC / ESPN+)
Weight class				Method	Round	Time	Notes
Featherweight	Ilia Topuria	def.	Josh Emmett	Decision (unanimous) (50–44, 50–42, 49–45)	5	5:00
Women's Flyweight	Maycee Barber	def.	Amanda Ribas	TKO (punches and elbows)	2	3:42
Heavyweight	Austen Lane	vs.	Justin Tafa	No Contest (accidental eye poke)	1	0:29	(Note: Accidental eye poke rendered Tafa unable to continue.)
Featherweight	David Onama	def.	Gabriel Santos	KO (punch)	2	4:13
Middleweight	Brendan Allen	def.	Bruno Silva	Submission (rear-naked choke)	1	4:39
Preliminary card (ESPN / ESPN+)
Welterweight	Neil Magny	def.	Philip Rowe	Decision (split) (29–28, 28–29, 29–28)	3	5:00
Welterweight	Randy Brown	def.	Wellington Turman	Decision (unanimous) (29–28, 29–28, 29–28)	3	5:00
Catchweight (157.25 lb)	Mateusz Rębecki	def.	Loik Radzhabov	TKO (punch)	2	2:36
Women's Strawweight	Tabatha Ricci	def.	Gillian Robertson	Decision (unanimous) (29–28, 29–28, 30–27)	3	5:00
Flyweight	Joshua Van	def.	Zhalgas Zhumagulov	Decision (split) (28–29, 29–28, 29–28)	3	5:00
Lightweight	Chepe Mariscal	def.	Trevor Peek	Decision (unanimous) (30–27, 30–27, 30–27)	3	5:00
Featherweight	Jack Jenkins	def.	Jamall Emmers	Decision (split) (27–30, 29–28, 29–28)	3	5:00
Middleweight	Sedriques Dumas	def.	Cody Brundage	Decision (unanimous) (30–27, 29–28, 30–27)	3	5:00

== Bonus awards ==
The following fighters received $50,000 bonuses.

- Fight of the Night: Ilia Topuria vs. Josh Emmett
- Performance of the Night: Maycee Barber and David Onama

== See also ==
- List of UFC events
- List of current UFC fighters
- 2023 in UFC
