= UFC 292 =

Mixed martial arts event in 2023

UFC 292: Sterling vs. O'Malley
- The poster for UFC 292: Sterling vs. O'Malley
- Promotion: Ultimate Fighting Championship
- Date: August 19, 2023
- Venue: TD Garden
- City: Boston, Massachusetts, United States
- Attendance: 18,293
- Total gate: $7,247,654.86

Event chronology
UFC on ESPN: Luque vs. dos Anjos	UFC 292: Sterling vs. O'Malley	UFC Fight Night: Holloway vs. The Korean Zombie

UFC 292: Sterling vs. O'Malley was a mixed martial arts event produced by the Ultimate Fighting Championship that took place on August 19, 2023, at the TD Garden in Boston, Massachusetts, United States.

== Background ==
The event marked the promotion's seventh visit to Boston and first since UFC on ESPN: Reyes vs. Weidman in October 2019.

A UFC Bantamweight Championship bout between current champion Aljamain Sterling and Sean O'Malley headlined the event.

A UFC Women's Strawweight Championship bout between current two-time champion Zhang Weili and Amanda Lemos served as the co-headliner.

The lightweight and bantamweight finals of The Ultimate Fighter: Team McGregor vs. Team Chandler took place at the event.

Former LFA Middleweight Champion Gregory Rodrigues and Denis Tiuliulin were expected to meet in a middleweight bout at UFC on ABC: Emmett vs. Topuria. However, the bout was postponed to this event after Tiuliulin withdrew due to undisclosed reasons.

A bantamweight bout between former UFC Flyweight and Bantamweight Champion Henry Cejudo (also 2008 Olympic gold medalist in freestyle wrestling) and Marlon Vera was expected to take place at the event. However, Cejudo withdrew in late June due to a shoulder injury. He was replaced by Pedro Munhoz.

A bantamweight bout between Rob Font and Song Yadong was expected to take place at the event. However, Yadong withdrew for unknown reasons and Font was instead scheduled to face Cory Sandhagen two weeks prior at UFC on ESPN: Sandhagen vs. Font as Sandhagen was in need of a new opponent.

A welterweight bout between Ian Machado Garry and Geoff Neal was expected to take place at the event. However, Neal withdrew due to undisclosed health reasons. He was replaced by Neil Magny.

Former bantamweight champion Cody Garbrandt was scheduled to face Mario Bautista. However, Garbrandt pulled out due to injury a week before the event. He was replaced by Da'Mon Blackshear, who last fought a week before at UFC on ESPN: Luque vs. dos Anjos.

== Results ==
Main card
Weight class				Method	Round	Time	Notes
Bantamweight	Sean O'Malley	def.	Aljamain Sterling (c)	TKO (punches)	2	0:51	(Note: For the UFC Bantamweight Championship.)
Women's Strawweight	Zhang Weili (c)	def.	Amanda Lemos	Decision (unanimous) (50–43, 50–44, 49–45)	5	5:00	(Note: For the UFC Women's Strawweight Championship.)
Welterweight	Ian Machado Garry	def.	Neil Magny	Decision (unanimous) (30–26, 30–26, 30–24)	3	5:00
Bantamweight	Mario Bautista	def.	Da'Mon Blackshear	Decision (unanimous) (29–28, 29–28, 30–27)	3	5:00
Bantamweight	Marlon Vera	def.	Pedro Munhoz	Decision (unanimous) (30–27, 30–27, 29–28)	3	5:00
Preliminary card (ESPN / ESPN+)
Middleweight	Brad Tavares	def.	Chris Weidman	Decision (unanimous) (30–27, 30–27, 30–27)	3	5:00
Middleweight	Gregory Rodrigues	def.	Denis Tiuliulin	KO (elbows)	1	1:43
Lightweight	Kurt Holobaugh	def.	Austin Hubbard	Submission (triangle choke)	2	2:39	(Note: The Ultimate Fighter 31 lightweight tournament final.)
Bantamweight	Brad Katona	def.	Cody Gibson	Decision (unanimous) (29–28, 29–28, 30–27)	3	5:00	(Note: The Ultimate Fighter 31 bantamweight tournament final.)
Early preliminary card (ESPN+ / UFC Fight Pass)
Middleweight	Andre Petroski	def.	Gerald Meerschaert	Decision (split) (28–29, 29–28, 29–28)	3	5:00
Women's Flyweight	Natália Silva	def.	Andrea Lee	Decision (unanimous) (30–27, 30–27, 30–27)	3	5:00
Women's Flyweight	Karine Silva	def.	Maryna Moroz	Submission (guillotine choke)	1	4:59

== Bonus awards ==
The following fighters received $50,000 bonuses.

- Fight of the Night: Brad Katona vs. Cody Gibson
- Performance of the Night: Sean O'Malley and Zhang Weili

== Reported payout ==
The following is the reported payout to the athletes as reported to the Massachusetts State Athletic Commission (MSAC). It does not include sponsor money or "locker room" bonuses often given by the UFC.

- Sean O’Malley: $500,000 (no win bonus) def. Aljamain Sterling: $500,000
- Zhang Weili: $520,000 (no win bonus) def. Amanda Lemos: $250,000
- Ian Machado Garry: $100,000 (includes $50,000 win bonus) def. Neil Magny: $134,000
- Mario Bautista: $86,000 (includes $43,000 win bonus) def. Da’Mon Blackshear: $27,000
- Marlon Vera: $310,000 (includes $155,000 win bonus) def. Pedro Munhoz: $150,000
- Brad Tavares: $200,000 (includes $100,000 win bonus) def. Chris Weidman: $426,000
- Gregory Rodrigues: $100,000 (includes $50,000 win bonus) def. Denis Tiuliulin: $14,000
- Kurt Holobaugh: $30,000 (includes $15,000 win bonus) def. Austin Hubbard: $32,000
- Brad Katona: $64,000 (includes $32,000 win bonus) def. Cody Gibson: $15,000
- Andre Petroski: $36,000 (includes $18,000 win bonus) def. Gerald Meerschaert: $100,000
- Natália Silva: $80,000 (includes $40,000 win bonus) def. Andrea Lee: $70,000
- Karine Silva: $28,000 (includes $14,000 win bonus) def. Maryna Moroz: $50,000

== See also ==
- List of UFC events
- List of current UFC fighters
- 2023 in UFC
