= Josh Emmett =

American mixed martial artist (born 1985)

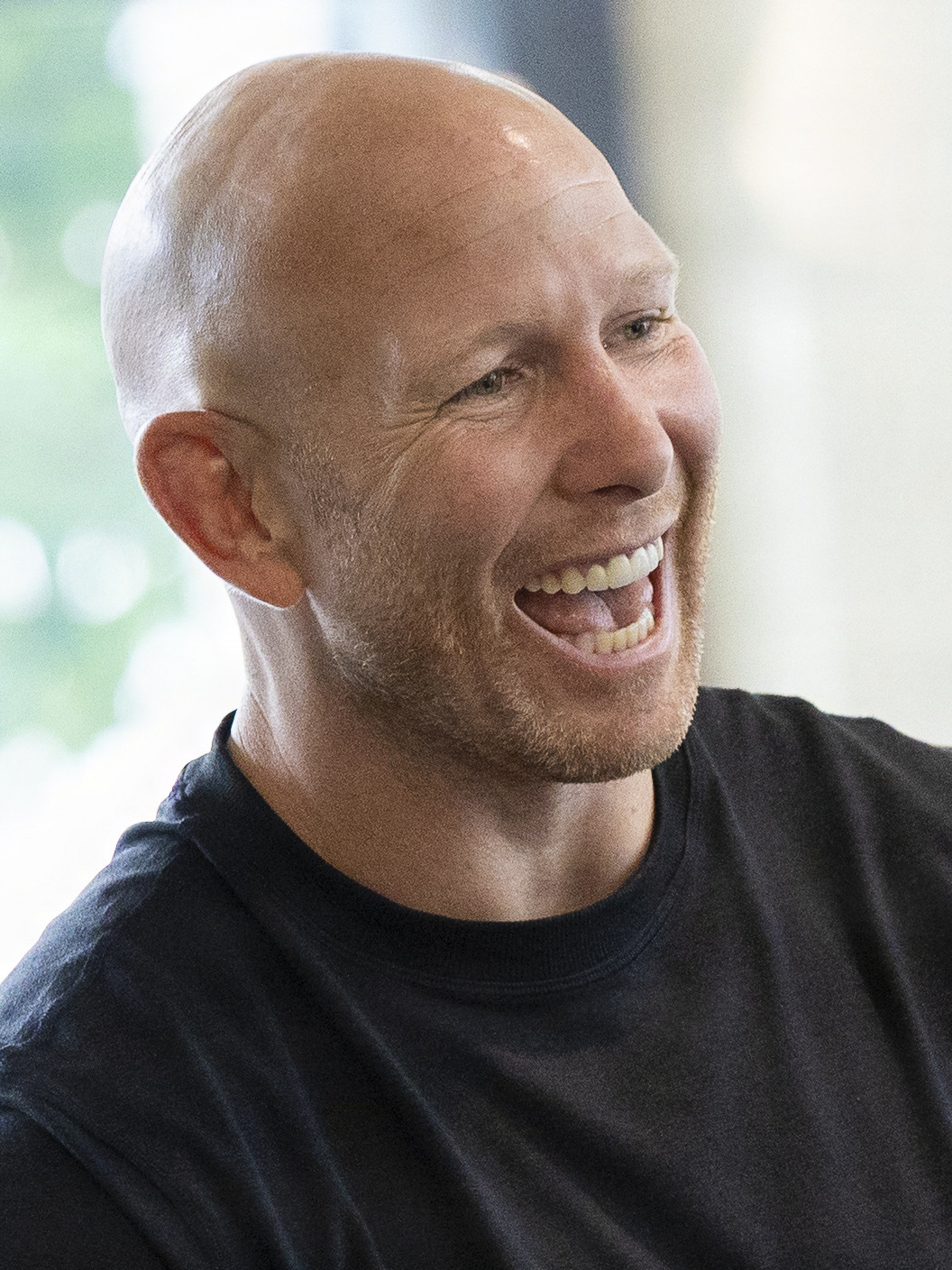
- Emmett in 2026
- Born: Joshua James Emmett; March 4, 1985 (age 41); Phoenix, Arizona, U.S.
- Height: 5 ft 6 in (1.68 m)
- Weight: 145 lb (66 kg; 10.4 st)
- Division: Featherweight (2011–2014, 2017–present); Lightweight (2014–2017)
- Reach: 70 in (178 cm)
- Style: Collegiate Wrestling, Amateur MMA
- Fighting out of: Sacramento, California, U.S.
- Team: Team Alpha Male (2006–present)
- Rank: Purple belt in Brazilian Jiu-Jitsu
- Wrestling: NAIA Wrestling
- Years active: 2011–present

Mixed martial arts record
- Total: 26
- Wins: 19
- By knockout: 7
- By submission: 2
- By decision: 10
- Losses: 7
- By knockout: 2
- By submission: 2
- By decision: 3

Amateur record
- Total: 2
- Wins: 2
- By knockout: 2

Other information
- University: Menlo College
- Website: https://www.joshemmett.com
- Mixed martial arts record from Sherdog

Joshua James Emmett (born March 4, 1985) is an American professional mixed martial artist. He currently competes in the Featherweight division of the Ultimate Fighting Championship (UFC). A professional since 2011, Emmett has also competed for King of the Cage.

== Background ==
Emmett was born in Phoenix, Arizona, on March 4, 1985. He grew up in a dysfunctional family with a single mom and late brother, Nick. He studied psychology in college with the intention of going into law enforcement and earned his Bachelor of Liberal Arts degree at Menlo College.

He wrestled for 14 years; beginning at El Camino Fundamental High School and continuing through his college years. Emmett wrestled his first two seasons at the junior college level at Sacramento City College, before transferring to NAIA Menlo College. After his collegiate career was over, he joined Urijah Faber's Ultimate Fitness to continue his desire in competing in combat sports. Emmett is also an accomplished Brazilian jiu-jitsu grappler, he won a World championship in the blue belt no-gi division.

== Mixed martial arts career ==
=== Early career ===
==== 2011 ====
After compiling an amateur record of 2–0, Emmett started his professional MMA career on October 8, 2011, and made his debut in Capitol Fighting Championship as a Featherweight. He broke his hand in the first round and continued with the fight and managed to earn his first win by unanimous decision.

Emmett had surgery on his broken hand and had a 10 month lay off from competing. He returned to training to prepare for his next fight and broke the same hand on his last sparring session prior to the fight event which forced him to take another long break before returning to the cage.

==== 2013 ====
After his first professional win, he made a move to compete in West Coast Fighting Championship (WFC) and made his debut on August 3, 2013, against Mike Ryan, winning via guillotine choke in the first round.

On November 16, 2013, Emmett faced Noah Schnable and defeated him in 45 seconds in round one with TKO (punches).

==== 2014 ====
Emmett's third opponent with West Coast Fighting Championship was Adin Duenas on February 15, 2014. He managed to secure a win via unanimous decision.

Two months after the fight with Duenas, Emmett faced Tramain Smith at West Coast Fighting Championship 9. He won the fight via TKO (punches) in round one.

On September 13, 2014, Emmett was up against Tony Rios and judges awarded a win with a unanimous decision in favor of Emmett.

Emmett faced Brandon Ricetti on November 15, 2014, at West Coast Fighting Championship 12 in a five-round fight for the lightweight title belt. In the fifth round, Emmett loaded with punches, pressing Recetti to fall forward when Emmett hit Ricetti with a knee and Ricetti was KO. The fight was ruled a No Decision at first as Ricetti was grounded when he got kneed. However, the decision was overturned after a review of the incident and a win was awarded to Emmett via unanimous technical decision. Emmett was crowned WFC Lightweight Champion.

==== 2015 ====
After he secured the championship belt, Emmett didn't return to compete until almost one year later on October 3, 2015, at KOTC promotion, facing Rocky Johnson. Emmett showed off his submission skills and won the fight via arm-triangle choke.

==== 2016 ====
Emmett returned to fight in West Coast Fighting Championship promotion in Sacramento, California, US, on January 23, 2016, against Christos Giagos, a former UFC fighter. Emmett secured a win via TKO at 2:21 of round 3 and also won the ISCF - International Sport Combat Federation (ISCF) Pro California Lightweight Title.

=== Ultimate Fighting Championship ===
After garnering a 9–0 record as a professional, Emmett signed with the UFC.

==== 2016 ====
Emmett made his promotional debut as a short notice replacement on May 8, 2016, against Jon Tuck at UFC Fight Night 87, where he replaced an injured Nick Hein. Emmett suffered a compound fracture on his left right finger from catching Tuck's spinning back kick and the referee halted the fight briefly prior to restarting. Emmett secured a win with split decision (29-28, 28-29, 29-28).

Emmett was expected to face Jeremy Kennedy on August 27, 2016, at UFC on Fox 21. However, Emmett was forced out of the event, due to an injury.

On December 17, 2016, Emmett faced Scott Holtzman at UFC on Fox 22. The three round fight was a back and forth battle and judges awarded the win to Emmett via unanimous decision.

==== 2017 ====
Emmett faced promotional newcomer Desmond Green on April 8, 2017, at UFC 210. Emmett was outpointed by Green's striking and lost the fight via split decision of 29-28, 28-29, and 30-27.

Emmett faced Felipe Arantes in a featherweight bout on October 21, 2017, at UFC Fight Night 118. He won the fight via unanimous decision. Emmett dedicated this win to his friend's son, who has heart condition, at the age of 11 and has gone through an experimental surgery.

Emmett faced Ricardo Lamas on December 16, 2017, at UFC on Fox: Lawler vs. dos Anjos. At the weigh ins, Emmett weighed in at 148.5 pounds, 2.5 pounds over the featherweight upper limit of 146 pounds and the bout proceeded at a catchweight. Emmett forfeited 30% of his purse to Lamas. Emmett won the fight via knockout in the first round.

==== 2018 ====
Emmett faced Jeremy Stephens at UFC on Fox 28, which took place on February 24, 2018, in Orlando, Florida. Despite hurting Stephens in the first round, Emmett lost the fight by knockout in the second round, after being hurt with a knee and elbows to the head. As a result, Emmett was sidelined for the remainder of 2018, after undergoing successful surgery to correct facial injuries sustained during the Stephens fight.

==== 2019 ====
Emmett faced Michael Johnson on March 30, 2019, at UFC on ESPN 2. He won the fight via knockout in the third round.

Emmett faced Mirsad Bektić on July 13, 2019, at UFC Fight Night 155. He won the fight via technical knockout in round one. This win earned him the Performance of the Night award.

==== 2020 ====
Emmett was expected to face Arnold Allen on January 25, 2020, at UFC Fight Night 166. However, Emmett pulled out the fight, citing an undisclosed injury, and he was replaced by Nik Lentz.

Emmett was expected to face Edson Barboza on May 2, 2020, at UFC Fight Night: Hermansson vs. Weidman. However, on April 9, Dana White, the president of UFC announced, that this event was postponed, and the bout cancelled.

With one fight left on his contract, Emmett signed a new four-fight contract with the UFC. As the first fight of his new prevailing contract, Emmett faced Shane Burgos on June 20, 2020, at UFC on ESPN: Blaydes vs. Volkov. He won the bout via unanimous decision. This win earned him the Fight of the Night award. Emmett was sidelined for the remainder of 2020 and most of 2021, recovering from a litany of injuries to his left leg sustained in the fight, including an ACL tear.

==== 2021 ====
Emmett faced Dan Ige on December 11, 2021, at UFC 269. He won the fight by unanimous decision.

==== 2022 ====
Emmett faced Calvin Kattar on June 18, 2022, in the main event at UFC on ESPN 37. He won the close bout via split decision. 14 of the 19 media members scored the fight in favor of Kattar. The bout earned Emmett the Fight of the Night award.

==== 2023 ====
Emmett faced Yair Rodríguez for the Interim UFC Featherweight Championship on February 12, 2023, at UFC 284. Emmett lost the bout via triangle choke submission in the second round.

Emmett was initially scheduled to face Ilia Topuria on June 17, 2023, at UFC on ESPN 47. However, the promotion later announced, that the bout was shifted to headline UFC on ABC: Emmett vs. Topuria on June 24, 2023. Emmett lost the fight via unanimous decision. The bout earned him the Fight of the Night award.

Emmett was scheduled to face Giga Chikadze on December 16, 2023, at UFC 296. However, Chikadze withdrew, due to an undisclosed injury, and he was replaced by Bryce Mitchell. Emmett won the fight via knockout in the first round. This fight earned Emmett the Performance of the Night award.

==== 2025 ====
Emmett faced Lerone Murphy on April 5, 2025 in the main event at UFC on ESPN 65. He lost the fight by unanimous decision.

Emmett faced Youssef Zalal on October 4, 2025 at UFC 320. He lost the fight via an armbar submission in the first round.

==== 2026 ====
Emmett faced Kevin Vallejos in the main event on March 14, 2026, at UFC Fight Night 269. He lost the fight by technical knockout in the first round.

== Championships and accomplishments ==
- Ultimate Fighting Championship
  - Performance of the Night (Two times) vs. Mirsad Bektić and Bryce Mitchell
  - Fight of the Night (Three times) vs. Shane Burgos, Calvin Kattar & Ilia Topuria
  - Tied (Cub Swanson) for most knockdowns in UFC Featherweight division history (12)
    - Tied (Chuck Liddell, Quinton Jackson, Cody Garbrandt, Montel Jackson & Ilia Topuria) for most consecutive fights with a knockdown landed in UFC history (7)
  - UFC Honors Awards
    - 2020: President's Choice Fight of the Year Nominee vs. Shane Burgos
  - UFC.com Awards
    - 2016: Ranked #8 Newcomer of the Year
    - 2017: Ranked #2 Upset of the Year vs. Ricardo Lamas
    - 2019: Ranked #10 Knockout of the Year vs. Michael Johnson
    - 2020: Ranked #4 Fight of the Year vs. Shane Burgos
    - 2023: Knockout of the Year vs. Bryce Mitchell
- West Coast Fighting Championship
  - WCFC Lightweight Champion (One time)
  - ISCF Pro California Lightweight Champion (One time)
- Sportsnaut
  - 2023 UFC Knockout of the Year vs. Bryce Mitchell at UFC 296

== Personal life ==
Emmett is married to his wife Vanessa.

== Mixed martial arts record ==
Professional record breakdown
26 matches	19 wins	7 losses
By knockout	7	2
By submission	2	2
By decision	10	3

Res.	Record	Opponent	Method	Event	Date	Round	Time	Location	Notes
Loss	19–7	Kevin Vallejos	TKO (knees and punches)	UFC Fight Night: Emmett vs. Vallejos	March 14, 2026	1	3:33	Las Vegas, Nevada, United States	
Loss	19–6	Youssef Zalal	Submission (armbar)	UFC 320	October 4, 2025	1	1:38	Las Vegas, Nevada, United States	
Loss	19–5	Lerone Murphy	Decision (unanimous)	UFC on ESPN: Emmett vs. Murphy	April 5, 2025	5	5:00	Las Vegas, Nevada, United States	
Win	19–4	Bryce Mitchell	KO (punch)	UFC 296	December 16, 2023	1	1:57	Las Vegas, Nevada, United States	Performance of the Night.
Loss	18–4	Ilia Topuria	Decision (unanimous)	UFC on ABC: Emmett vs. Topuria	June 24, 2023	5	5:00	Jacksonville, Florida, United States	Fight of the Night.
Loss	18–3	Yair Rodríguez	Submission (triangle choke)	UFC 284	February 12, 2023	2	4:19	Perth, Australia	For the interim UFC Featherweight Championship.
Win	18–2	Calvin Kattar	Decision (split)	UFC on ESPN: Kattar vs. Emmett	June 18, 2022	5	5:00	Austin, Texas, United States	Fight of the Night.
Win	17–2	Dan Ige	Decision (unanimous)	UFC 269	December 11, 2021	3	5:00	Las Vegas, Nevada, United States	
Win	16–2	Shane Burgos	Decision (unanimous)	UFC on ESPN: Blaydes vs. Volkov	June 20, 2020	3	5:00	Las Vegas, Nevada, United States	Fight of the Night.
Win	15–2	Mirsad Bektić	TKO (punches)	UFC Fight Night: de Randamie vs. Ladd	July 13, 2019	1	4:25	Sacramento, California, United States	Performance of the Night.
Win	14–2	Michael Johnson	KO (punch)	UFC on ESPN: Barboza vs. Gaethje	March 30, 2019	3	4:14	Philadelphia, Pennsylvania, United States	
Loss	13–2	Jeremy Stephens	KO (elbows)	UFC on Fox: Emmett vs. Stephens	February 24, 2018	2	1:35	Orlando, Florida, United States	
Win	13–1	Ricardo Lamas	KO (punch)	UFC on Fox: Lawler vs. dos Anjos	December 16, 2017	1	4:33	Winnipeg, Manitoba, Canada	Catchweight (148.5 lb) bout; Emmett missed weight.
Win	12–1	Felipe Arantes	Decision (unanimous)	UFC Fight Night: Cowboy vs. Till	October 21, 2017	3	5:00	Gdańsk, Poland	Return to Featherweight.
Loss	11–1	Desmond Green	Decision (split)	UFC 210	April 8, 2017	3	5:00	Buffalo, New York, United States	
Win	11–0	Scott Holtzman	Decision (unanimous)	UFC on Fox: VanZant vs. Waterson	December 17, 2016	3	5:00	Sacramento, California, United States	
Win	10–0	Jon Tuck	Decision (split)	UFC Fight Night: Overeem vs. Arlovski	May 8, 2016	3	5:00	Rotterdam, Netherlands	
Win	9–0	Christos Giagos	TKO (punches)	West Coast FC 16	January 23, 2016	3	2:21	Sacramento, California, United States	Won the ISCF Pro California Lightweight Championship.
Win	8–0	Rocky Johnson	Submission (arm-triangle choke)	KOTC: Total Elimination	October 3, 2015	1	2:45	Oroville, California, United States	Catchweight (165 lb) bout.
Win	7–0	Brandon Ricetti	Technical Decision (unanimous)	West Coast FC 12	November 15, 2014	5	0:24	Sacramento, California, United States	Won the WCFC Lightweight Championship.
Win	6–0	Tony Rios	Decision (unanimous)	West Coast FC 11	September 13, 2014	3	5:00	Sacramento, California, United States	
Win	5–0	Tramain Smith	TKO (punches)	West Coast FC 9	April 26, 2014	1	2:28	Sacramento, California, United States	Lightweight debut.
Win	4–0	Adin Duenas	Decision (unanimous)	West Coast FC 8	February 15, 2014	3	5:00	Sacramento, California, United States	
Win	3–0	Noah Schnable	TKO (punches)	West Coast FC 7	November 16, 2013	1	0:45	Jackson, California, United States	
Win	2–0	Mike Ryan	Submission (guillotine choke)	West Coast FC 6	August 3, 2013	1	1:52	Placerville, California, United States	
Win	1–0	Emilio Gonzales	Decision (unanimous)	Capitol FC: Fall Classic	October 8, 2011	3	5:00	Sacramento, California, United States	Featherweight debut.

== See also ==
- List of current UFC fighters
- List of male mixed martial artists
