= UFC Fight Night: Holloway vs. The Korean Zombie =

Mixed martial arts event in 2023

- The poster for UFC Fight Night: Holloway vs. The Korean Zombie
- Promotion: Ultimate Fighting Championship
- Date: August 26, 2023
- Venue: Singapore Indoor Stadium
- City: Singapore
- Attendance: 10,263
- Total gate: $1,288,777

Event chronology
UFC 292: Sterling vs. O'Malley	UFC Fight Night: Holloway vs. The Korean Zombie	UFC Fight Night: Gane vs. Spivac

UFC Fight Night: Holloway vs. The Korean Zombie (also known as UFC Fight Night 225 and UFC on ESPN+ 83) was a mixed martial arts event produced by the Ultimate Fighting Championship that took place on August 26, 2023, at the Singapore Indoor Stadium in Kallang, Singapore.

== Background ==
The event marked the promotion's sixth visit to Singapore and first since UFC 275 in June 2022.

A featherweight bout between former UFC Featherweight Champion Max Holloway and former title challenger Jung Chan-sung served as the event's headliner.

A women's flyweight bout between former UFC Women's Flyweight Championship challenger Taila Santos and Erin Blanchfield took place at this event. They were previously scheduled to headline UFC Fight Night: Andrade vs. Blanchfield but Santos withdrew after her cornermen were denied visas into the United States.

== Results ==
Main card (ESPN+)
Weight class				Method	Round	Time	Notes
Featherweight	Max Holloway	def.	Jung Chan-sung	KO (punch)	3	0:23
Light Heavyweight	Anthony Smith	def.	Ryan Spann	Decision (split) (28–29, 29–28, 29–28)	3	5:00
Featherweight	Giga Chikadze	def.	Alex Caceres	Decision (unanimous) (30–27, 30–27, 30–27)	3	5:00
Bantamweight	Rinya Nakamura	def.	Fernie Garcia	Decision (unanimous) (30–26, 30–27, 30–27)	3	5:00
Women's Flyweight	Erin Blanchfield	def.	Taila Santos	Decision (unanimous) (29–28, 29–28, 29–28)	3	5:00
Heavyweight	Junior Tafa	def.	Parker Porter	KO (punch)	1	1:24
Preliminary card (ESPN+)
Heavyweight	Waldo Cortes-Acosta	def.	Łukasz Brzeski	KO (punches)	1	3:01
Bantamweight	Garrett Armfield	def.	Toshiomi Kazama	TKO (punches)	1	4:16
Middleweight	Michał Oleksiejczuk	def.	Chidi Njokuani	TKO (punches)	1	4:16
Welterweight	Song Kenan	def.	Rolando Bedoya	Decision (unanimous) (29–28, 29–28, 29–28)	3	5:00
Welterweight	Billy Goff	def.	Yusaku Kinoshita	TKO (punches)	1	3:49
Women's Flyweight	JJ Aldrich	def.	Liang Na	TKO (punches and elbows)	2	4:49
Featherweight	Choi Seung-woo	def.	Jarno Errens	Decision (unanimous) (30–27, 29–28, 29–28)	3	5:00

== Bonus awards ==
The following fighters received $50,000 bonuses.

- Fight of the Night: Max Holloway vs. Jung Chan-sung
- Performance of the Night: Junior Tafa and Michał Oleksiejczuk

== See also ==
- List of UFC events
- List of current UFC fighters
- 2023 in UFC
