= Geoff Neal =

American mixed martial artist (born 1990)

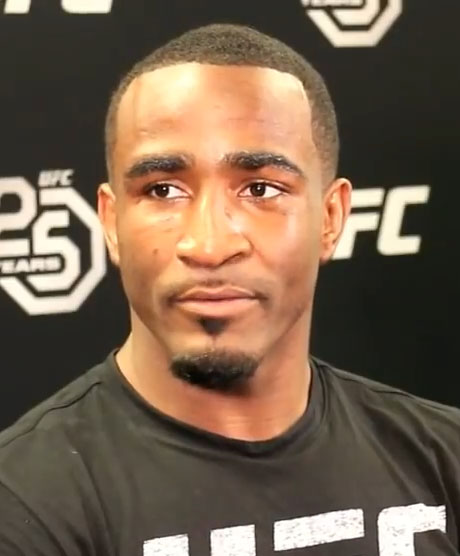
- Neal at UFC 228 in 2018
- Born: Geoffrey Charles Neal; August 28, 1990 (age 36); Austin, Texas, U.S.
- Other names: Handz of Steel
- Height: 5 ft 11 in (180 cm)
- Weight: 170 lb (77 kg; 12 st 2 lb)
- Reach: 75 in (191 cm)
- Fighting out of: Dallas, Texas, U.S.
- Team: Fortis MMA
- Trainer: Sayif Saud
- Rank: Purple belt in Brazilian Jiu-Jitsu
- Years active: 2012–present

Mixed martial arts record
- Total: 24
- Wins: 16
- By knockout: 10
- By submission: 2
- By decision: 4
- Losses: 8
- By knockout: 3
- By submission: 2
- By decision: 3

Amateur record
- Total: 11
- Wins: 10
- By submission: 1
- Losses: 1

Other information
- University: Texas Lutheran
- Mixed martial arts record from Sherdog

Geoffrey Charles Neal (born August 28, 1990) is an American professional mixed martial artist. He currently competes in the Welterweight division of the Ultimate Fighting Championship (UFC).

== Background ==
Neal was born in Austin, Texas, United States. He played football at private university Texas Lutheran. However, he did not like the football program there and transitioned to compete in MMA, coached under Sayif Saud.

== Mixed martial arts career ==
=== Early career ===
Neal made his amateur debut in 2010, a second-round win by knockout against Bobby Hernandez. He competed in a total of seven amateur matches, ending with a 6–1 amateur record. Before being signed by the UFC, Neal competed in a total of ten mixed martial arts matches, winning eight and losing two of them.

=== Dana White's Tuesday Night Contender Series ===
Neal appeared on Dana White's Contender Series 3 and faced Chase Waldon. He won the fight via technical knockout in the first round and was signed by the UFC.

=== Ultimate Fighting Championship ===
Neal made his promotional debut on February 18, 2018, against Brian Camozzi at UFC Fight Night 126. He won the bout via submission in the first round.

Neal next faced Frank Camacho on September 8, 2018, at UFC 228. He won the fight via knockout in the second round.

Neal faced Belal Muhammad on January 19, 2019, at UFC Fight Night 143. He won the fight by unanimous decision.

Neal faced Niko Price on July 27, 2019, at UFC 240. He won the fight via technical knockout in round two. This fight earned him the Performance of the Night award.

Neal faced Mike Perry on December 14, 2019, at UFC 245. He won the fight via first-round technical knockout.

Neal was expected to face Neil Magny on August 29, 2020, at UFC Fight Night 175. However, Neal withdrew from the event due to health issues and he was replaced by Robbie Lawler.

Neal faced Stephen Thompson on December 19, 2020, in the headliner of UFC Fight Night 183. He lost the fight via unanimous decision.

Neal faced Neil Magny at UFC on ESPN 24 on May 8, 2021. He lost the fight via unanimous decision.

Neal faced Santiago Ponzinibbio on December 11, 2021, at UFC 269. He won the back-and-forth bout via split decision. 10 out of 14 media scores gave it to Neal.

Neal faced Vicente Luque on August 6, 2022, at UFC on ESPN 40. He won the fight via knockout in round three. This win earned him the Performance of the Night award.

Neal was scheduled to face Shavkat Rakhmonov on January 14, 2023, at UFC Fight Night 217. However, on December 29, Neal pulled out due to undisclosed injury. The pair was rescheduled for UFC 285 on March 4, 2023. At the weigh-ins on March 3, Neal weighed in at 175 pounds, 4 pounds over the non-title welterweight limit. As a result, the bout proceeded as a catchweight and Neal was fined 30% of his fight purse, which went to Rakhmonov. He lost the fight via a rear-naked choke submission in the third round. Despite his failure to make weight, UFC president Dana White was so pleased with the fight and impressed with Neal's outing that Neal still received his share of the Fight of the Night award.

Neal was scheduled to face Ian Machado Garry at UFC 292 on August 19, 2023. However, Neal withdrew due to undisclosed health reasons, and was replaced by Neil Magny. A bout with Garry was rescheduled and took place on February 17, 2024, at UFC 298. Neal lost in a competitive bout by split decision.

Neal faced Rafael dos Anjos on October 26, 2024, at UFC 308. He won the fight via technical knockout in round one after dos Anjos suffered a knee injury.

Neal was scheduled to face Carlos Prates on April 12, 2025 at UFC 314. However, Neal withdrew from the fight for unknown reasons and the bout was subsequently cancelled. The bout has since been re-scheduled and took place on August 16, 2025 at UFC 319. He lost the fight via knockout in round one.

Neal was scheduled to face Kevin Holland in a rematch on February 21, 2026 at UFC Fight Night 267, after their first meeting in January 2017. However, for undisclosed reasons, Holland was replaced by Uroš Medić. Neal lost the fight by knockout in the first round.

Neal was scheduled to face Chidi Njokuani on August 15, 2026 at UFC 330. However, Neal had to withdraw for undisclosed reasons and was replaced by Joel Álvarez.

Neal is scheduled to face Chris Curtis on January 16, 2027 at UFC Fight Night 296.

== Championships and accomplishments ==
- Ultimate Fighting Championship
  - Performance of the Night (Two times) vs. Niko Price and Vicente Luque
  - Fight of the Night (One time) vs. Shavkat Rakhmonov
  - UFC Honors Awards
    - 2023: President's Choice Fight of the Year Nominee vs. Shavkat Rakhmonov
  - UFC.com Awards
    - 2023: Ranked #4 Fight of the Year vs. Shavkat Rakhmonov
- MMA Junkie
  - 2019 Under-the-Radar Fighter of the Year
- Bleacher Report
  - 2023 #4 Ranked UFC Fight of the Year vs. Shavkat Rakhmonov at UFC 285

== Personal life ==
Neal worked as a server at a Texas Roadhouse in Dallas for ten years until his fight with Mike Perry in late 2019. In June 2020, Neal revealed he had returned to his job as a server after failing to get fights scheduled.

In August 2020, Neal revealed he went into septic shock after suffering from an unspecified infection. Neal was admitted to the intensive care unit where it was determined he was also experiencing congestive heart and kidney failure. After taking some time to recover, Neal resumed his mixed martial arts career in December 2020.

On November 25, 2021, Neal was arrested in Collin County, Texas on charges of driving under the influence and unlawful possession of a firearm, two misdemeanors. He was later released from jail on $2,000 bond.

== Mixed martial arts record ==
Professional record breakdown
24 matches	16 wins	8 losses
By knockout	10	3
By submission	2	2
By decision	4	3

Res.	Record	Opponent	Method	Event	Date	Round	Time	Location	Notes
Loss	16–8	Uroš Medić	KO (punches)	UFC Fight Night: Strickland vs. Hernandez	February 21, 2026	1	1:19	Houston, Texas, United States	
Loss	16–7	Carlos Prates	KO (spinning back elbow)	UFC 319	August 16, 2025	1	4:59	Chicago, Illinois, United States	
Win	16–6	Rafael dos Anjos	TKO (knee injury)	UFC 308	October 26, 2024	1	1:30	Abu Dhabi, United Arab Emirates	
Loss	15–6	Ian Machado Garry	Decision (split)	UFC 298	February 17, 2024	3	5:00	Anaheim, California, United States	
Loss	15–5	Shavkat Rakhmonov	Submission (rear-naked choke)	UFC 285	March 4, 2023	3	4:17	Las Vegas, Nevada, United States	Catchweight (175 lb) bout; Neal missed weight. Fight of the Night.
Win	15–4	Vicente Luque	KO (punches)	UFC on ESPN: Santos vs. Hill	August 6, 2022	3	2:01	Las Vegas, Nevada, United States	Performance of the Night.
Win	14–4	Santiago Ponzinibbio	Decision (split)	UFC 269	December 11, 2021	3	5:00	Las Vegas, Nevada, United States	
Loss	13–4	Neil Magny	Decision (unanimous)	UFC on ESPN: Rodriguez vs. Waterson	May 8, 2021	3	5:00	Las Vegas, Nevada, United States	
Loss	13–3	Stephen Thompson	Decision (unanimous)	UFC Fight Night: Thompson vs. Neal	December 19, 2020	5	5:00	Las Vegas, Nevada, United States	
Win	13–2	Mike Perry	TKO (head kick and punches)	UFC 245	December 14, 2019	1	1:30	Las Vegas, Nevada, United States	
Win	12–2	Niko Price	TKO (punches)	UFC 240	July 27, 2019	2	2:39	Edmonton, Alberta, Canada	Performance of the Night.
Win	11–2	Belal Muhammad	Decision (unanimous)	UFC Fight Night: Cejudo vs. Dillashaw	January 19, 2019	3	5:00	Brooklyn, New York, United States	
Win	10–2	Frank Camacho	KO (head kick)	UFC 228	September 8, 2018	2	1:23	Dallas, Texas, United States	
Win	9–2	Brian Camozzi	Submission (rear-naked choke)	UFC Fight Night: Cowboy vs. Medeiros	February 18, 2018	1	2:48	Austin, Texas, United States	
Win	8–2	Chase Waldon	TKO (punches)	Dana White's Contender Series 3	July 25, 2017	1	1:56	Las Vegas, Nevada, United States	Middleweight bout.
Win	7–2	Bilal Williams	TKO (punches)	LFA 16	July 14, 2017	1	4:43	Dallas, Texas, United States	
Loss	6–2	Kevin Holland	TKO (punches)	Xtreme Knockout 34	January 28, 2017	3	3:50	Dallas, Texas, United States	For the vacant XKO Middleweight Championship.
Win	6–1	Ty Flores	TKO (punches)	Rumble Time Promotions: Rage	October 23, 2015	1	3:58	St. Charles, Missouri, United States	
Win	5–1	Charlie Ontiveros	TKO (retirement)	Legacy FC 37	November 14, 2014	2	5:00	Houston, Texas, United States	Catchweight (172 lb) bout; Neal missed weight.
Win	4–1	Christopher Anthony	Decision (unanimous)	Legacy FC 32	June 20, 2014	3	5:00	Bossier City, Louisiana, United States	
Win	3–1	Armando Servin	Decision (unanimous)	Xtreme Knockout 19	August 17, 2013	3	3:00	Dallas, Texas, United States	
Loss	2–1	Martin Sano	Submission (rear-naked choke)	24/7 Entertainment 9	April 19, 2013	3	1:25	Odessa, Texas, United States	Return to Welterweight; Neal missed weight (172 lb).
Win	2–0	Zack Board	TKO (punches)	Xtreme Knockout 17	January 12, 2013	2	1:46	Arlington, Texas, United States	Middleweight debut.
Win	1–0	David McAfee	Submission (rear-naked choke)	Blood & Glory 1	August 25, 2012	1	2:15	Robstown, Texas, United States	Welterweight debut.

== See also ==
- List of current UFC fighters
- List of Dana White's Contender Series alumni
- List of male mixed martial artists
