= UFC 296 =

Mixed martial arts event in 2023

UFC 296: Edwards vs. Covington
- The poster for UFC 296: Edwards vs. Covington
- Promotion: Ultimate Fighting Championship
- Date: December 16, 2023
- Venue: T-Mobile Arena
- City: Paradise, Nevada, United States
- Attendance: 19,039
- Total gate: $9,300,000

Event chronology
UFC Fight Night: Song vs. Gutiérrez	UFC 296: Edwards vs. Covington	UFC Fight Night: Ankalaev vs. Walker 2

UFC 296: Edwards vs. Covington was a mixed martial arts event produced by the Ultimate Fighting Championship that took place on December 16, 2023, at the T-Mobile Arena in Paradise, Nevada, part of the Las Vegas Metropolitan Area, United States.

== Background ==
A UFC Welterweight Championship bout between current champion Leon Edwards and former interim champion Colby Covington headlined the event. Belal Muhammad served as backup and potential replacement for this fight.

A UFC Flyweight Championship bout between current champion Alexandre Pantoja and former LFA Flyweight Champion Brandon Royval took place at the event. The pair previously met at UFC on ESPN: Cannonier vs. Gastelum in August 2021 which Pantoja won by second-round submission. Former two-time champion Brandon Moreno served as backup and potential replacement for this fight.

A featherweight bout between former interim UFC Featherweight Championship challenger Josh Emmett and Giga Chikadze was expected to take place at this event. However, Chikadze withdrew due to a torn groin and was replaced by Bryce Mitchell.

A welterweight bout between Ian Machado Garry and Vicente Luque was expected to take place at the event. However, the bout was scrapped after Garry withdrew due to contracting pneumonia the week of the event.

A welterweight bout between Randy Brown and Muslim Salikhov was expected to take place at the event but was scrapped after Brown withdrew due to illness.

=== Strickland-du Plessis brawl ===
UFC Middleweight Champion Sean Strickland and challenger Dricus du Plessis were in attendance at the event, seated within two rows of each-other by Dana White's arrangement. While exchanging words, Strickland gestured for audience members to move and attacked du Plessis. The brawl was quickly broken up and Strickland was escorted out of the event. Despite the altercation, du Plessis pressed no charges.

== Results ==
Main card
Weight class				Method	Round	Time	Notes
Welterweight	Leon Edwards (c)	def.	Colby Covington	Decision (unanimous) (49–46, 49–46, 49–46)	5	5:00	(Note: For the UFC Welterweight Championship.)
Flyweight	Alexandre Pantoja (c)	def.	Brandon Royval	Decision (unanimous) (50–45, 50–45, 49–46)	5	5:00	(Note: For the UFC Flyweight Championship.)
Welterweight	Shavkat Rakhmonov	def.	Stephen Thompson	Submission (rear-naked choke)	2	4:56
Lightweight	Paddy Pimblett	def.	Tony Ferguson	Decision (unanimous) (30–27, 30–27, 30–27)	3	5:00
Featherweight	Josh Emmett	def.	Bryce Mitchell	KO (punch)	1	1:57
Preliminary card (ESPN2 / ESPN+)
Light Heavyweight	Alonzo Menifield	def.	Dustin Jacoby	Decision (unanimous) (29–28, 29–28, 29–28)	3	5:00
Women's Bantamweight	Irene Aldana	def.	Karol Rosa	Decision (unanimous) (29–28, 29–28, 29–28)	3	5:00
Bantamweight	Cody Garbrandt	def.	Brian Kelleher	KO (punch)	1	3:42
Women's Flyweight	Ariane Lipski	def.	Casey O'Neill	Submission (armbar)	2	1:18
Early preliminary card (ESPN+ / UFC Fight Pass)
Flyweight	Tagir Ulanbekov	def.	Cody Durden	Submission (face crank)	2	4:25
Featherweight	Andre Fili	def.	Lucas Almeida	TKO (punches)	1	3:32
Heavyweight	Shamil Gaziev	def.	Martin Buday	TKO (punches)	2	0:56

== Bonus awards ==
The following fighters received $50,000 bonuses.

- Fight of the Night: Irene Aldana vs. Karol Rosa
- Performance of the Night: Josh Emmett, Ariane Lipski, and Shamil Gaziev

== See also ==
- 2023 in UFC
- List of current UFC fighters
- List of UFC events
