= UFC on ESPN: Vettori vs. Cannonier =

Mixed martial arts event in 2023

- The poster for UFC on ESPN: Vettori vs. Cannonier
- Promotion: Ultimate Fighting Championship
- Date: June 17, 2023
- Venue: UFC Apex
- City: Enterprise, Nevada United States
- Attendance: Not announced

Event chronology
UFC 289: Nunes vs. Aldana	UFC on ESPN: Vettori vs. Cannonier	UFC on ABC: Emmett vs. Topuria

UFC on ESPN: Vettori vs. Cannonier (also known as UFC on ESPN 47 and UFC Vegas 75) was a mixed martial arts event produced by the Ultimate Fighting Championship that took place on June 17, 2023 at the UFC Apex facility in Enterprise, Nevada, part of the Las Vegas Metropolitan Area, United States.

== Background ==
A featherweight bout between former interim UFC Featherweight Championship challenger Josh Emmett and Ilia Topuria was expected to headline the event. However, the bout was postponed one week to headline UFC on ABC: Emmett vs. Topuria. The UFC then opted to book a middleweight bout between former UFC Middleweight Championship challengers Marvin Vettori and Jared Cannonier as the event's new headliner.

A bantamweight bout between Raoni Barcelos and Miles Johns was expected to take place at the event. However, Johns withdrew due to injury and the bout was canceled.

Zhalgas Zhumagulov and former LFA Flyweight Champion Felipe Bunes were expected to meet in a flyweight bout. However, Bunes pulled out during fight week due to a drug test subject to further analysis and Zhumagulov was rescheduled against Joshua Van a week later at UFC on ABC: Emmett vs. Topuria.

== Results ==
Main Card (ESPN / ESPN+)
Weight class				Method	Round	Time	Notes
Middleweight	Jared Cannonier	def.	Marvin Vettori	Decision (unanimous) (49–45, 49–45, 48–46)	5	5:00
Lightweight	Arman Tsarukyan	def.	Joaquim Silva	TKO (punches)	3	3:25
Middleweight	Armen Petrosyan	def.	Christian Leroy Duncan	Decision (unanimous) (30–27, 29–28, 29–28)	3	5:00
Featherweight	Pat Sabatini	def.	Lucas Almeida	Submission (arm-triangle choke)	2	1:48
Lightweight	Manuel Torres	def.	Nikolas Motta	KO (elbow)	1	1:50
Welterweight	Nicolas Dalby	def.	Muslim Salikhov	Decision (unanimous) (30–27, 30–27, 29–28)	3	5:00
Preliminary card (ESPN2 / ESPN+)
Flyweight	Alessandro Costa	def.	Jimmy Flick	TKO (elbows)	2	1:03
Bantamweight	Kang Kyung-ho	def.	Cristian Quiñónez	Submission (rear-naked choke)	1	2:25
Flyweight	Carlos Hernandez	def.	Denys Bondar	Technical Decision (unanimous) (30–27, 30–27, 29–28)	3	4:59	(Note: An inadvertent clash of heads during a slam knocked Bondar unconscious.)
Women's Flyweight	Tereza Bledá	def.	Gabriella Fernandes	Decision (unanimous) (30–27, 30–27, 30–27)	3	5:00
Bantamweight	Dan Argueta	vs.	Ronnie Lawrence	No Contest (overturned)	1	2:20	(Note: Originally a submission (guillotine choke) win for Argueta, overturned after review determined Lawrence did not tap.)
Light Heavyweight	Modestas Bukauskas	def.	Zac Pauga	Decision (unanimous) (30–27, 29–28, 29–28)	3	5:00

== Bonus awards ==
The following fighters received $50,000 bonuses.

- Fight of the Night: Jared Cannonier vs. Marvin Vettori
- Performance of the Night: Manuel Torres and Alessandro Costa

== See also ==
- List of UFC events
- List of current UFC fighters
- 2023 in UFC
