= Carlos Prates =

Brazilian mixed martial artist (born 1993)

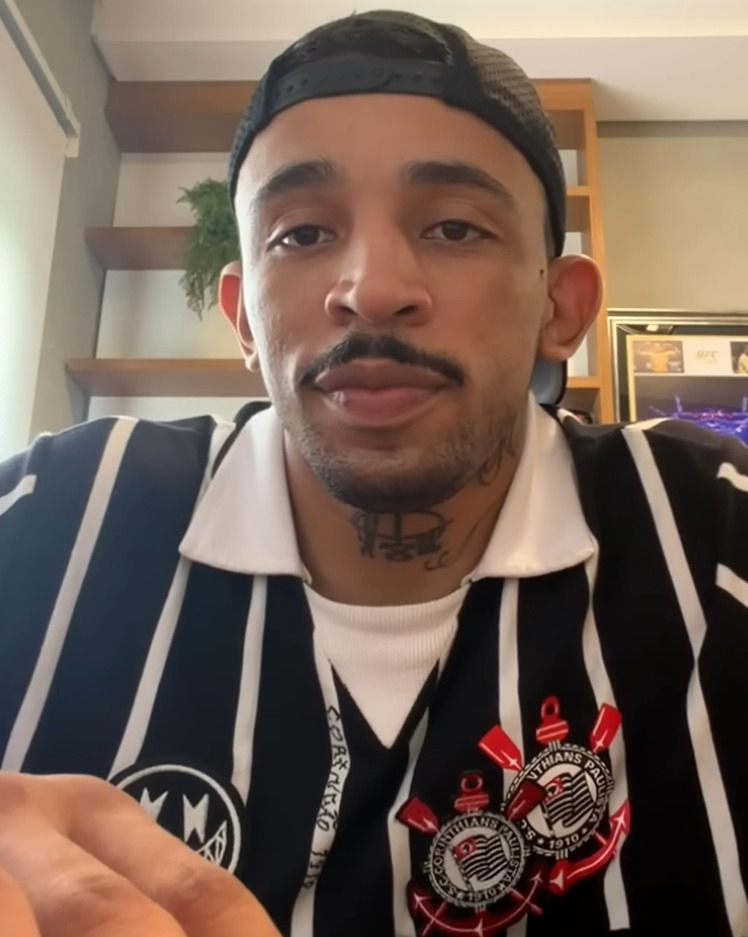
- Prates in 2026
- Born: Carlos Augusto Monteiro Prates; August 17, 1993 (age 33); Taubaté, São Paulo, Brazil
- Other names: The Nightmare
- Height: 6 ft 1 in (1.85 m)
- Weight: 170 lb (77 kg; 12 st 2 lb)
- Division: Featherweight (2013); Lightweight (2013–2014); Welterweight (2016–present)
- Reach: 78 in (198 cm)
- Style: Muay Thai
- Stance: Southpaw
- Fighting out of: Taubaté, Brazil
- Team: Vale Top Team / Fighting Nerds
- Rank: Black belt in Brazilian Jiu-Jitsu
- Years active: 2012–present

Kickboxing record
- Total: 34
- Wins: 29
- By knockout: 14
- Losses: 5

Mixed martial arts record
- Total: 31
- Wins: 24
- By knockout: 19
- By submission: 3
- By decision: 2
- Losses: 7
- By knockout: 2
- By submission: 3
- By decision: 2

Other information
- Mixed martial arts record from Sherdog

Carlos Prates (born August 17, 1993) is a Brazilian professional mixed martial artist and former Muay Thai fighter. He currently competes in the welterweight division of the Ultimate Fighting Championship (UFC). As of June 20, 2026, he is #1 in the Meta UFC welterweight rankings.

== Background ==
Prates was born August 17, 1993 in Taubaté, São Paulo, Brazil to a single mother. As a child, Prates struggled in school, and was eventually diagnosed with attention deficit hyperactivity disorder at eight years old. During his teenage years he started Muay Thai at Vale Top Team and after four years started his mixed martial arts career. After his fourth loss Prates would move to Thailand to learn Muay Thai and compete before switching back to MMA in 2016.

== Career ==
=== Muay Thai and kickboxing career ===
On April 2, 2016, Prates faced future Lethwei World Champion Dave Leduc at Rawai Boxing Stadium in Phuket, Thailand. He lost the fight by decision.

On April 7, 2018, Prates faced Wu Sihan in Weifang, China. He won the fight by unanimous decision.

On April 28, 2018, Prates faced Jacob Ginter at Phoenix 7 in Phuket, Thailand. He won the fight by second round knockout.

On October 20, 2018, Prates faced Zhou Wei at the WLK - Xinhong Cup event. He lost the fight by decision.

On November 21, 2018, Prates faced Chen Zijun at Kunlun Fight in China. He won the fight by first round knockout with a knee to the body.

On December 22, 2018, Prates faced Glory veteran Dmitry Menshikov at Muay Thai Factory 1. He lost the fight by decision.

On December 15, 2019, Prates faced Jiao Fukai at Hongjian Cup in Taicang, China. He won the fight by split decision.

On September 12, 2020, Prates faced former Rajadamnern Stadium champion Diesellek Seardammhooplara at Muay Hardcore. He won by first round knockout with a knee to the body.

On November 20, 2020, Prates faced Mansurbek Tolipov at UAM K-1 Combat. He won the fight by unanimous decision.

On June 25, 2021, Prates faced Dmitry Valent at Muaythai Night 6. He won the fight by split decision.

On November 6, 2021, Prates faced Dengue Silva for the SFT Xtreme Welterweight title. He won the fight by fifth round knockout with a body punch.

=== Mixed martial arts career ===
His professional MMA debut took place in 2012, but his early career had a rocky start. Over his first nine fights, he faced several challenges, finishing with a 5-4 record. These setbacks were partly attributed to his competing in an unsuitable weight class and a lack of discipline in his training regimen. Eventually, Prates honed his skills and found his stride, particularly after an extended stay in Thailand, where he gained valuable experience in Muay Thai.

Prates fought extensively in the Asian MMA scene, participating in events like China’s Chin Woo Men and Thailand’s Full Metal Dojo.

He also joined ONE Championship’s Warrior Series in 2019, where he gained recognition with wins against fighters such as Gunther Kalunda. Prates compiled a record of 15-6 from 2012 to 2023 before being invited to Dana White's Contender Series.

=== Dana White's Contender Series ===
Prates made his Contender Series debut on Week 4 of Season 7. He won via knockout in the second round, earning a UFC contract.

=== Ultimate Fighting Championship ===
Prates made his debut on February 10, 2024 at UFC Fight Night 236 against Trevin Giles. Prates won via KO in the second round. This earned him a Performance of the Night bonus.

Prates later fought at UFC on ESPN 57 against Charles Radtke, where he won via a knee to the body in the first round. This gave him another Performance of the Night bonus.

Prates made his pay-per-view debut at UFC 305 on August 18, 2024 against Li Jingliang. He won via a left hook knockout after dropping Jingliang twice, being the first to knockout Jingliang. This earned him his third consecutive Performance of the Night bonus.

Prates had his first main event on UFC Fight Night 247 against veteran Neil Magny. Prates defended all 7 of Magny's takedowns and dropped him twice, winning by knockout 4 minutes and 50 seconds into the first round. This earned Prates his fourth consecutive Performance of the Night award.

Prates was scheduled to face Geoff Neal on April 12, 2025 at UFC 314. However, Neal withdrew from the fight for unknown reasons and the bout was subsequently cancelled.

Prates faced Ian Machado Garry on April 26, 2025 in the main event at UFC on ESPN 66. He lost the fight by unanimous decision.

The bout between Prates and Neal was re-scheduled and eventually took place on August 16, 2025 at UFC 319. He won the fight via knockout in round one. This earned Prates his fifth Performance of the Night award.

Prates faced former UFC Welterweight Champion Leon Edwards on November 15, 2025 at UFC 322. He won the fight by knockout in the second round. This fight earned him another Performance of the Night award.

Prates faced former UFC Welterweight Champion Jack Della Maddalena on May 2, 2026 in the main event at UFC Fight Night 275. He won the fight by technical knockout in the third round. This fight earned him another Performance of the Night award.

As a result of current champion Islam Makhachev withdrawing for undisclosed reasons, Prates is instead scheduled to compete for the interim UFC Welterweight Championship against Michael Morales on January 30, 2027 at UFC 336.

== Fighting style ==
Prates is a stand-up striker and "knockout artist" known for his devastating power. He utilizes his length to counter opponents with long, rangy strikes from the outside, employing a variety of weapons including punches, leg kicks, knees up the middle, and step-in elbows. Defensively, he has been noted to fight with his hands low. All seven of his first UFC victories came via knockout.

== Personal life ==
Prates maintains a habit of smoking approximately 10-15 Marlboro cigarettes daily, even on fight days. Despite this, he has had great success in his UFC fights, often smoking shortly before entering the Octagon. Ahead of his fight against Neil Magny, Prates attempted to smoke just minutes before making the walk, before UFC personnel intervened.

== Championships and accomplishments ==
=== Mixed martial arts ===
- Ultimate Fighting Championship
  - Performance of the Night (Seven times) vs. Trevin Giles, Charles Radtke, Li Jingliang, Neil Magny, Geoff Neal, Leon Edwards and Jack Della Maddalena
    - Tied (Donald Cerrone, Ovince Saint Preux, Conor McGregor, Tom Aspinall & Song Yadong) for fourth most Performance of the Night awards in UFC history (7)
  - Second most knockdowns landed in UFC Welterweight division history (12) (behind Thiago Alves)
    - Seventh highest knockdown average per 15 minutes in UFC history (2.1)
    - Third highest knockdown average per 15 minutes in UFC Welterweight division history (2.1)
  - Tied (Robbie Lawler & Stephen Thompson) for sixth most knockouts in UFC Welterweight division history (7)
  - UFC Honors Awards
    - 2024: Fan's Choice Debut of the Year Winner vs. Trevin Giles
  - UFC.com Awards
    - 2024: Newcomer of the Year, Ranked #3 Fighter of the Year & Ranked #9 Knockout of the Year vs. Li Jingliang
    - 2025: Ranked #3 Knockout of the Year vs. Geoff Neal
- Standout Fighting Tournament
  - SFT Welterweight Championship (One time)
- MMA Junkie
  - 2024 Newcomer of the Year
- Cageside Press
  - 2024 Newcomer of the Year
- BodySlam.net
  - 2024 Rookie of the Year
- MMA Fighting
  - 2024 Rookie of the Year
  - 2024 First Team MMA All-Star
  - 2025 Second Team MMA All-Star
- ESPN
  - 2024 Best Newcomer
- Bloody Elbow
  - 2025 #5 Ranked Knockout of the Year vs. Geoff Neal at UFC 319
- MMA Mania
  - 2024 #3 Ranked Knockout of the Year vs. Charles Radtke at UFC on ESPN: Cannonier vs. Imavov
  - 2025 #3 Ranked Knockout of the Year vs. Geoff Neal at UFC 319
- Uncrowned
  - 2025 #4 Ranked Knockout of the Year vs. Geoff Neal at UFC 319

=== Kickboxing ===
- Standout Fighting Tournament
  - SFT Extreme Welterweight Championship (One time)

== Mixed martial arts record ==
Professional record breakdown
31 matches	24 wins	7 losses
By knockout	19	2
By submission	3	3
By decision	2	2

Res.	Record	Opponent	Method	Event	Date	Round	Time	Location	Notes
Win	24–7	Jack Della Maddalena	TKO (leg kicks and elbows)	UFC Fight Night: Della Maddalena vs. Prates	May 2, 2026	3	3:17	Perth, Australia	Performance of the Night.
Win	23–7	Leon Edwards	KO (punches)	UFC 322	November 15, 2025	2	1:28	New York City, New York, United States	Performance of the Night.
Win	22–7	Geoff Neal	KO (spinning back elbow)	UFC 319	August 16, 2025	1	4:59	Chicago, Illinois, United States	Performance of the Night.
Loss	21–7	Ian Machado Garry	Decision (unanimous)	UFC on ESPN: Machado Garry vs. Prates	April 26, 2025	5	5:00	Kansas City, Missouri, United States	
Win	21–6	Neil Magny	KO (punch)	UFC Fight Night: Magny vs. Prates	November 9, 2024	1	4:50	Las Vegas, Nevada, United States	Performance of the Night.
Win	20–6	Li Jingliang	KO (punches)	UFC 305	August 17, 2024	2	4:02	Perth, Australia	Performance of the Night.
Win	19–6	Charles Radtke	KO (knee to the body)	UFC on ESPN: Cannonier vs. Imavov	June 8, 2024	1	4:47	Louisville, Kentucky, United States	Performance of the Night.
Win	18–6	Trevin Giles	KO (punch)	UFC Fight Night: Hermansson vs. Pyfer	February 10, 2024	2	4:03	Las Vegas, Nevada, United States	Performance of the Night.
Win	17–6	Mitch Ramirez	TKO (punch)	Dana White's Contender Series 60	November 18, 2023	2	1:14	Las Vegas, Nevada, United States	
Win	16–6	Eduardo Ramon	KO (knee)	LFA 154	March 10, 2023	1	2:25	Cajamar, Brazil	
Win	15–6	Moacir Rocha	KO (head kick and punches)	LFA 146	November 4, 2022	1	4:15	Cajamar, Brazil	Catchweight (174.6 lb) bout; Rocha missed weight.
Win	14–6	Charles de Oliveira Santos	KO (punch)	Standout Fighting Tournament 37	September 3, 2022	1	3:14	São Paulo, Brazil	Won the vacant SFT Welterweight Championship.
Win	13–6	Taffarel Brasil	KO (punches and knee)	Standout Fighting Tournament 35	June 11, 2022	2	1:52	São Paulo, Brazil	Return to Welterweight.
Win	12–6	Alan Silva	TKO (punches)	Standout Fighting Tournament 32	December 18, 2021	1	1:21	São Paulo, Brazil	Lightweight bout.
Win	11–6	Joseph Luciano	Decision (unanimous)	ONE Warriors Series 9	December 4, 2019	3	5:00	Kallang, Singapore	
Loss	10–6	Gadzhimurad Abdullaev	Decision (unanimous)	ONE Warriors Series 6	June 20, 2019	3	5:00	Kallang, Singapore	
Win	10–5	Gunther Kalunda Ngunza	KO (body kick)	ONE Warriors Series 5	April 25, 2019	2	4:45	Kallang, Singapore	Middleweight debut.
Win	9–5	Tuluosibake Kuerbanjiang	TKO (punches)	WLF W.A.R.S. 30	December 14, 2018	1	0:28	Zhengzhou, China	
Win	8–5	Tao Jiang	TKO (punches)	Chin Woo Men: 2016-2017 Season, Stage 7	April 7, 2017	2	3:35	Guangzhou, China	
Loss	7–5	Mikhail Romanchuk	TKO (punches)	Chin Woo Men: 2016-2017 Season, Stage 3	January 7, 2017	1	2:03	Guangzhou, China	
Win	7–4	Sun Jiming	Submission (guillotine choke)	Chin Woo Men: 2016-2017 Season, Stage 1	November 6, 2016	1	1:57	Guangzhou, China	
Win	6–4	Yousef Wehbe	Submission (rear-naked choke)	Full Metal Dojo 8	January 10, 2016	2	2:56	Phuket, Thailand	Welterweight debut.
Loss	5–4	Ary Santos	Submission (rear-naked choke)	MMA Super Heroes 6	October 25, 2014	1	3:24	São Paulo, Brazil	
Win	5–3	Bruno Pereira	Submission (armbar)	Strong Fight Combat 2	June 14, 2014	3	2:13	Taubaté, Brazil	
Loss	4–3	Claudiere Freitas	Submission (triangle choke)	Premium Fight Championship 3	November 22, 2013	1	3:10	Campinas, Brazil	
Win	4–2	Cosme Santos	KO (body kick)	Brazil Combate 2	November 10, 2013	1	2:21	Americana, Brazil	
Loss	3–2	Diogo Cavalcanti	Submission (heel hook)	Standout Fighting Tournament 1	September 20, 2013	1	4:54	São Paulo, Brazil	Return to Lightweight.
Win	3–1	Rodrigo Haro	Decision (majority)	Detonic Fight 2	May 11, 2013	3	5:00	Ouro Fino, Brazil	Featherweight debut.
Loss	2–1	Rafael Nunes	TKO (retirement)	Max Fight 13	May 13, 2012	1	2:15	São Paulo, Brazil	
Win	2–0	Renato da Silva Jr.	TKO (punches)	Romani Fight Brazil 1	March 24, 2012	3	4:08	Taubaté, Brazil	
Win	1–0	Sergio Vieira	TKO (body kick and punches)	Max Fight 11	March 17, 2012	2	2:05	Campinas, Brazil	Lightweight debut.

== Muay Thai and kickboxing record (incomplete) ==
Professional Muay Thai and Kickboxing record
29 Wins (14 KOs, 14 Decisions), 5 Losses (5 Decisions)
Date	Result	Opponent	Event	Location	Method	Round	Time
2021-11-06	Win	(Brazil) Dengue Silva	SFT Xtreme 2	São Paulo, Brazil	KO (Body shot)	5	1:32
Wins the vacant SFT Xtreme Welterweight (168 lbs) title.
2021-08-05	Win	(Brazil) Vinicius Dionizio	SFT 28	São Paulo, Brazil	Decision (Unanimous)	3	3:00
2021-06-25	Win	(Belarus) Dmitry Valent	UAM Muaythai Night 6	Abu Dhabi, United Arab Emirates	Decision (Split)	3	3:00
2020-11-20	Win	(Uzbekistan) Mansurbek Tolipov	UAM K-1 Combat	Dubai, United Arab Emirates	Decision (Unanimous)	3	3:00
2020-09-12	Win	(Thailand) Diesellek Seardammhooplara	Muay Hardcore	Bangkok, Thailand	KO (Knee to the body)	1	2:52
2019-12-15	Win	(China) Jiao Fukai	Hongjian Cup	Taicang, China	Decision (Split)	3	3:00
2019-03-09	Win	(France) Flo Singpatong	Patong Boxing Stadium	Phuket, Thailand	KO (Left cross)	4	
2019-02-11	Win	(Thailand)	Patong Boxing Stadium	Phuket, Thailand	Decision	5	3:00
2018-12-22	Loss	(Russia) Dmitry Menshikov	Muay Thai Factory 1	Perm, Russia	Decision	3	3:00
2018-12-01	Win	(China) Ma Jiansheng	Kunlun Fight Club Professional League - Round 7	China	Decision (Unanimous)	3	3:00
2018-11-21	Win	(China) Chen Zijun	Kunlun Fight Club Professional League - Round 6	China	KO (Knee to the body)	1	1:13
2018-11-04	Win	(Thailand) Nontachai Sittisukato	All Star Fight	Pattaya, Thailand	Decision	3	3:00
2018-10-20	Loss	(China) Zhou Wei	WLK - Xinhong Cup	Taicang, China	Decision	3	3:00
2018-08-31	Win	(China) Wang Mingwu	MMC 035, Final	Shenzhen, China	KO (Knee to the body)	1	0:48
2018-08-29	Win	(China) Zhao Guangzhou	MMC 035, Semifinals	Shenzhen, China	Decision	3	3:00
2018-08-20	Win	(Thailand)	Patong Boxing Stadium	Phuket, Thailand	Decision	5	3:00
2018-04-07	Win	(China) Wu Sihan	Shining Dragon World Championship	Weifang, China	Decision (Unanimous)	3	3:00
2018-04-28	Win	(United States) Jacob Ginter	Phoenix 7 Phuket	Phuket, Thailand	KO (Knee to the body)	2	
2018-03-16	Loss	(France) Kamel Mezatni	WPMF World Championships	Ayutthaya, Thailand	Decision (Unanimous)	5	3:00
For the vacant WPMF World Super Middleweight (168 lbs) title.
2018-02-14	Win	(Thailand)	Bangla Boxing Stadium	Phuket, Thailand	KO (Knee to the body)	4	
Wins the vacant Bangla Stadium title.
2018-01-29	Win	(Thailand)	Patong Boxing Stadium	Phuket, Thailand	KO (Left cross)		
2017-12-06	Win	(China) Wang Huaisheng	King of Kungfu Champion Fight	China	Decision (Unanimous)	3	3:00
2017-06-	Win	(China)		China	KO	1	
2016-12-31	Win	(China)		China	KO (Flying knee)		
2016-12-17	Win	(China) Liu Dacheng	WKPL - Dream Hero	Shangqiu, China	Decision	3	3:00
2016-04-16	Win	(China) Li Baoming	Superstar Fight	Changsha, China	Ext.R Decision	4	3:00
2016-04-02	Loss	(Canada) Dave Leduc	Rawai Boxing Stadium	Phuket, Thailand	Decision	5	3:00
2016-03-28	Win	(Thailand)	Patong Boxing Stadium	Phuket, Thailand	KO (Elbow)	1	
2016-03-19	Win	(France) Sliman Zegnoun	Patong Boxing Stadium	Phuket, Thailand	Decision	5	3:00
2016-01-	Win	(China)		China	TKO (Punches)	1	
2015-12-05	Loss	(Thailand)	Patong Boxing Stadium	Phuket, Thailand	Decision	5	3:00
2015-11-30	Win	(Thailand)	Patong Boxing Stadium	Phuket, Thailand	KO (Left hook to the body)	1	
2015-11-19	Win	(Thailand)	Patong Boxing Stadium	Phuket, Thailand	KO (Flying knee)	2	
2015-11-14	Win	(Russia) Dimitry Madmedov	Bangla Boxing Stadium	Phuket, Thailand	KO (Left hook to the body)	3	
Legend: Win Loss Draw/No contest Notes

== See also ==
- List of current UFC fighters
- List of Dana White's Contender Series alumni
- List of male mixed martial artists
