= Ian Machado Garry =

Irish mixed martial artist

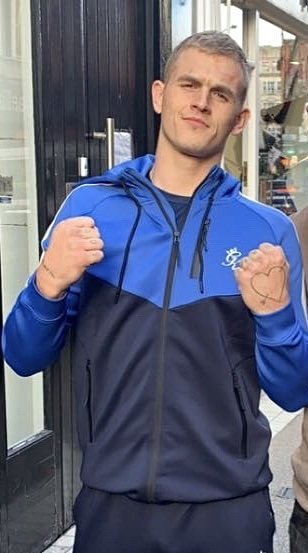
- Garry in 2023
- Born: Ian David Garry; 17 November 1997 (age 29); Portmarnock, Dublin, Ireland
- Other names: The Future
- Height: 6 ft 3 in (1.91 m)
- Weight: 170 lb (77 kg; 12 st 2 lb)
- Division: Welterweight
- Reach: 74 in (188 cm)
- Fighting out of: Dublin, Ireland
- Team: Team KF Martial Arts (2017–2021); Kill Cliff FC (2021–2023); Chute Boxe Diego Lima (2023–present); Bangtao Muay Thai & MMA
- Rank: Black belt in Judo
- Years active: 2019–present

Mixed martial arts record
- Total: 19
- Wins: 17
- By knockout: 7
- By submission: 1
- By decision: 9
- Losses: 2
- By decision: 2

Amateur record
- Total: 7
- Wins: 6
- By knockout: 5
- By submission: 1
- Losses: 1
- By decision: 1

Other information
- Children: 1
- Mixed martial arts record from Sherdog

Ian David Machado Garry (né Garry; born 17 November 1997) is an Irish professional mixed martial artist who currently competes in the Welterweight division of the Ultimate Fighting Championship (UFC). Prior to signing with the UFC, Garry was a Cage Warriors Welterweight Champion. As of 20 June 2026, he is #2 in the Meta UFC welterweight rankings.

== Background ==
Hailing from Portmarnock, County Dublin in Ireland, Garry started training boxing at 10 years old. When Conor McGregor drew attention to MMA in Ireland, Garry was inspired to try judo to expand his martial art skillset. He became a black belt in judo at the age of 18. After attending Dublin Institute of Technology for a couple of months, he dropped out to focus on martial arts. He had his first amateur bout shortly after he turned 19, and debuted professionally at the age of 21.

== Mixed martial arts career ==
=== Early career ===
Garry made his amateur mixed martial arts debut in November 2017 and finished his amateur career in November 2018, with a 6–1 record with six finishes and a decision loss.

He made his professional debut in February 2019 at Cage Warriors 101, where he won against James Sheehan via unanimous decision and earned the Fight of the Night award as well as a contract with the promotion. Garry accumulated four more consecutive wins, before facing two-fight UFC veteran Rostem Akman at Cage Warriors 121. He won the bout in under 8 minutes, setting up a matchup at Cage Warriors 125 against Jack Grant for the Cage Warriors Welterweight Championship. He won the bout and the title via unanimous decision.

=== Ultimate Fighting Championship ===
In July 2021, Garry, the reigning Cage Warriors Welterweight Champion announced that he had signed a contract with the UFC. He made his promotional debut on 6 November 2021 against Jordan Williams, scoring a first-round knockout win at UFC 268.

Garry faced Darian Weeks on 9 April 2022, at UFC 273. He won the fight via unanimous decision.

Garry faced Gabriel Green on 2 July 2022, at UFC 276. He won the bout via unanimous decision.

Garry fought Song Kenan on 4 March 2023, at UFC 285. After being knocked down in the first round, he won the bout via technical knockout in the third round.

Garry faced Daniel Rodriguez at UFC on ABC 4 on 13 May 2023. He won the bout via TKO in the first round. This win earned him the Performance of the Night award.

Garry was scheduled to face Geoff Neal at UFC 292 on 19 August 2023. However, Neal withdrew due to undisclosed health reasons, and was replaced by Neil Magny. Garry won the fight via unanimous decision.

Garry was scheduled to face Vicente Luque on 16 December 2023, at UFC 296. However, the bout was scrapped after Garry withdrew due to contracting pneumonia the week of the event.

Garry was rebooked to face Geoff Neal on 9 March 2024, at UFC 299, but the pair were then moved to instead meet on 17 February 2024, at UFC 298 for unknown reasons. He won in a competitive bout by split decision.

Garry faced Michael Page on 29 June 2024, at UFC 303. He won the fight by unanimous decision.

In his next fight, Garry was scheduled to face Joaquin Buckley on 14 December 2024, at UFC on ESPN 63; however he was pulled from the event in order to face Shavkat Rakhmonov on 7 December 2024 at UFC 310 in a 5-round title eliminator. Garry lost the fight by unanimous decision, his first MMA loss.

Garry faced Carlos Prates on 26 April 2025 in the main event at UFC on ESPN 66. He won the fight by unanimous decision.

Garry faced former UFC Welterweight Champion Belal Muhammad on 22 November 2025 at UFC Fight Night 265. He won the fight by unanimous decision.

Garry competed for the UFC Welterweight Championship against champion Islam Makhachev on 15 August 2026 at UFC 330. He lost the fight via unanimous decision.

Garry was scheduled to face Yaroslav Amosov on 12 December 2026 at UFC 335. However, the bout was shifted to 5 December 2026 one week earlier at UFC Fight Night 295 to serve at the five-round co-main event for undisclosed reasons.

== Personal life ==
Garry married English television presenter Layla Anna-Lee in Las Vegas on 26 February 2022. In April 2022, it was announced she was pregnant with the couple's first child. Their son was born in October 2022. Garry later adopted the surname "Machado Garry", with Machado being Layla's maiden name. Layla had a son from a previous relationship and Garry stated that "I wanted my son and my stepson to really feel connected. I didn't want them going through life with two separate surnames."

Garry has spent time in Brazil and can speak Portuguese.

Garry is vegan.

== Championships and accomplishments ==
=== Mixed martial arts ===
- Ultimate Fighting Championships
  - Performance of the Night (One time) vs. Daniel Rodriguez
  - Tied (Leon Edwards & Jack Della Maddalena) for the third longest win streak in UFC Welterweight division history (8)
- Cage Warriors Fighting Championship
  - CWFC Welterweight Championship (One time; former)
- LowKick MMA
  - 2021 #2 Ranked Prospect of the Year
- MMA Fighting
  - 2023 Second Team MMA All-Star
- Slacky Awards
  - 2025 Gameplan of the Year vs. Carlos Prates at UFC on ESPN: Machado Garry vs. Prates

== Mixed martial arts record ==
Professional record breakdown
19 matches	17 wins	2 losses
By knockout	7	0
By submission	1	0
By decision	9	2

Res.	Record	Opponent	Method	Event	Date	Round	Time	Location	Notes
Loss	17–2	Islam Makhachev	Decision (unanimous)	UFC 330	August 15, 2026	5	5:00	Philadelphia, Pennsylvania, United States	For the UFC Welterweight Championship.
Win	17–1	Belal Muhammad	Decision (unanimous)	UFC Fight Night: Tsarukyan vs. Hooker	November 22, 2025	3	5:00	Al Rayyan, Qatar	
Win	16–1	Carlos Prates	Decision (unanimous)	UFC on ESPN: Machado Garry vs. Prates	April 26, 2025	5	5:00	Kansas City, Missouri, United States	
Loss	15–1	Shavkat Rakhmonov	Decision (unanimous)	UFC 310	December 7, 2024	5	5:00	Las Vegas, Nevada, United States	UFC Welterweight title eliminator.
Win	15–0	Michael Page	Decision (unanimous)	UFC 303	June 29, 2024	3	5:00	Las Vegas, Nevada, United States	
Win	14–0	Geoff Neal	Decision (split)	UFC 298	February 17, 2024	3	5:00	Anaheim, California, United States	
Win	13–0	Neil Magny	Decision (unanimous)	UFC 292	August 19, 2023	3	5:00	Boston, Massachusetts, United States	
Win	12–0	Daniel Rodriguez	TKO (head kick and punches)	UFC on ABC: Rozenstruik vs. Almeida	May 13, 2023	1	2:57	Charlotte, North Carolina, United States	Performance of the Night.
Win	11–0	Song Kenan	TKO (punches)	UFC 285	March 4, 2023	3	4:22	Las Vegas, Nevada, United States	
Win	10–0	Gabriel Green	Decision (unanimous)	UFC 276	July 2, 2022	3	5:00	Las Vegas, Nevada, United States	
Win	9–0	Darian Weeks	Decision (unanimous)	UFC 273	April 9, 2022	3	5:00	Jacksonville, Florida, United States	
Win	8–0	Jordan Williams	KO (punches)	UFC 268	November 6, 2021	1	4:59	New York City, New York, United States	
Win	7–0	Jack Grant	Decision (unanimous)	Cage Warriors 125	June 26, 2021	5	5:00	London, England	Won the vacant Cage Warriors Welterweight Championship.
Win	6–0	Rostem Akman	KO (head kick)	Cage Warriors 121	March 19, 2021	2	2:28	Liverpool, England	
Win	5–0	Lawrence Jordan Tracey	TKO (punches and elbows)	Cage Warriors 119	December 12, 2020	1	4:02	London, England	
Win	4–0	George McManus	TKO (punches and head kick)	Cage Warriors 115	September 25, 2020	2	3:17	Manchester, England	
Win	3–0	Mateusz Figlak	Technical Submission (rear-naked choke)	Cage Warriors 110	November 9, 2019	1	3:41	Cork, Ireland	
Win	2–0	Matteo Ceglia	TKO (flying knee)	Cage Warriors: Unplugged 2	September 6, 2019	2	1:01	London, England	Catchweight (177 lb) bout.
Win	1–0	James Sheehan	Decision (unanimous)	Cage Warriors 101	February 16, 2019	3	5:00	Liverpool, England	Welterweight debut.

== See also ==
- List of current UFC fighters
- List of male mixed martial artists

Awards and achievements
Vacant Title last held by Mason Jones	12th Cage Warriors Welterweight Champion; June 26, 2021 – July 26, 2021; Vacated	Vacant Title next held by Rhys McKee
