= UFC 308 =

Mixed martial arts event in 2024

UFC 308: Topuria vs. Holloway
- The poster for UFC 308: Topuria vs. Holloway
- Promotion: Ultimate Fighting Championship
- Date: October 26, 2024
- Venue: Etihad Arena
- City: Abu Dhabi, United Arab Emirates
- Attendance: Not announced
- Total gate: Not announced

Event chronology
UFC Fight Night: Hernandez vs. Pereira	UFC 308: Topuria vs. Holloway	UFC Fight Night: Moreno vs. Albazi

UFC 308: Topuria vs. Holloway was a mixed martial arts event produced by the Ultimate Fighting Championship that took place on October 26, 2024, at the Etihad Arena in Abu Dhabi, United Arab Emirates.

== Background ==
The event marked the promotion's 20th visit to Abu Dhabi and first since UFC on ABC: Sandhagen vs. Nurmagomedov in August 2024.

A UFC Featherweight Championship bout between current champion Ilia Topuria and former champion Max Holloway headlined the event. Diego Lopes served as backup and potential replacement for this fight.

A five-round middleweight bout between former UFC Middleweight Champion (also The Ultimate Fighter: The Smashes welterweight winner) Robert Whittaker and Khamzat Chimaev took place at the event. They were previously expected to headline UFC on ABC: Whittaker vs. Aliskerov last June, but Chimaev withdrew due to illness.

A heavyweight rematch between former interim UFC Heavyweight Champion Ciryl Gane and former Bellator Heavyweight World Champion Alexander Volkov was expected to take place at the event. The pairing previously headlined UFC Fight Night: Gane vs. Volkov in June 2021 which Gane won by unanimous decision. However, the bout was moved to UFC 310 due to Volkov's knee injury.

A heavyweight bout between Marcos Rogério de Lima and Kennedy Nzechukwu was scheduled for this event. However, Lima withdrew from the fight for unknown reasons and was replaced by Justin Tafa. Subsequently, Tafa withdrew from the bout due to an injury and was replaced by Chris Barnett.

A welterweight bout between Rinat Fakhretdinov and Nursulton Ruziboev was scheduled for this event. However, Ruziboev withdrew from the fight due to an injury and was replaced by former LFA Welterweight Champion and promotional newcomer Carlos Leal.

A bantamweight bout between Said Nurmagomedov and Daniel Santos was scheduled for this event. However, one week before the event, Santos withdrew from the fight for unknown reasons and the bout was subsequently cancelled.

At the weigh-ins, a lightweight bout between Mateusz Rębecki and Myktybek Orolbai was changed to a 160 pounds catchweight bout. In addition, at the weigh-ins, the originally contracted bantamweight bout between Farid Basharat and Victor Hugo was changed to a featherweight bout after Hugo weighed in at 145.5 pounds, 9.5 pounds over the bantamweight non-title fight limit; although Basharat weighed in at 137 pounds, he agreed to allow the fight to take place at featherweight.

== Results ==
Main card
Weight class				Method	Round	Time	Notes
Featherweight	Ilia Topuria (c)	def.	Max Holloway	KO (punches)	3	1:34	(Note: For the UFC Featherweight Championship.)
Middleweight	Khamzat Chimaev	def.	Robert Whittaker	Submission (face crank)	1	3:34
Light Heavyweight	Magomed Ankalaev	def.	Aleksandar Rakić	Decision (unanimous) (29–28, 29–28, 29–28)	3	5:00
Featherweight	Lerone Murphy	def.	Dan Ige	Decision (unanimous) (29–28, 29–28, 29–28)	3	5:00
Middleweight	Sharabutdin Magomedov	def.	Armen Petrosyan	KO (spinning backfists)	2	4:52
Preliminary card (ESPN+)
Light Heavyweight	Ibo Aslan	def.	Raffael Cerqueira	TKO (punches)	1	0:51
Welterweight	Geoff Neal	def.	Rafael dos Anjos	TKO (knee injury)	1	1:30
Catchweight (160 lb)	Mateusz Rębecki	def.	Myktybek Orolbai	Decision (split) (28–29, 29–28, 29–28)	3	5:00
Middleweight	Abusupiyan Magomedov	def.	Brunno Ferreira	Submission (arm-triangle choke)	3	3:14
Heavyweight	Kennedy Nzechukwu	def.	Chris Barnett	TKO (knee to the body and punches)	1	4:27
Featherweight	Farid Basharat	def.	Victor Hugo	Decision (unanimous) (30–27, 29–28, 29–28)	3	5:00
Middleweight	Ismail Naurdiev	def.	Bruno Silva	Decision (unanimous) (30–27, 30–27, 30–27)	3	5:00
Welterweight	Rinat Fakhretdinov	def.	Carlos Leal	Decision (unanimous) (29–28, 29–28, 30–27)	3	5:00

== Bonus awards ==
The following fighters received $50,000 bonuses.

- Fight of the Night: Mateusz Rębecki vs. Myktybek Orolbai
- Performance of the Night: Ilia Topuria, Khamzat Chimaev and Sharabutdin Magomedov

== See also ==
- 2024 in UFC
- List of current UFC fighters
- List of UFC events
