= Omar Morales (fighter) =

Venezuelan mixed martial arts fighter

- Born: Omar Antonio Morales Ferrer; October 17, 1985 (age 41); Caracas, Venezuela
- Height: 5 ft 11 in (1.80 m)
- Weight: 155 lb (70 kg; 11 st 1 lb)
- Division: Lightweight; Featherweight
- Reach: 73.0 in (185 cm)
- Fighting out of: Florida, United States
- Team: Sanford MMA
- Years active: 2011–present

Mixed martial arts record
- Total: 15
- Wins: 11
- By knockout: 2
- By submission: 5
- By decision: 4
- Losses: 4
- By knockout: 1
- By submission: 1
- By decision: 2

Other information
- Mixed martial arts record from Sherdog

Omar Antonio Morales Ferrer (born October 17, 1985) is a Venezuelan mixed martial artist who competes in the Featherweight and Lightweight divisions. He is most notable for his time in the Ultimate Fighting Championship.

== Mixed martial arts career ==
=== Early career ===
Starting his career in 2011, Morales compiled a 7–0 record, fighting mainly for various regional Venezuelan promotions and picking up a knockout win at Bellator 204. Morales moved to United States in order to pursuit his career in mixed martial arts in 2015.

=== Dana White's Contender Series ===
Morales was eventually invited to Dana White's Contender Series 23, where he faced the then Legacy Fighting Alliance Lightweight champ, Harvey Park, for a UFC contract. he finished the fight with the use of leg kicks and eventually winning by TKO, earning himself a chance into the UFC.

=== Ultimate Fighting Championship ===
Morales made his promotional debut facing Dong Hyun Ma on December 21, 2019, at UFC on ESPN+ 23. He won the fight by unanimous decision.

Next Morales faced Gabriel Benítez on May 13, 2020, at UFC Fight Night: Smith vs. Teixeira. He won the fight via unanimous decision.

Morales then faced Giga Chikadze on October 11, 2020 at UFC Fight Night: Moraes vs. Sandhagen. He lost the fight by unanimous decision.

Morales faced Shane Young on March 27, 2021, at UFC 260. He won the fight via unanimous decision.

Morales faced Jonathan Pearce on September 25, 2021, at UFC 266. He lost the fight via rear-naked choke in round two.

Morales faced Uroš Medić on May 21, 2022, at UFC Fight Night 206. He lost the fight via technical knockout in round two.

Morales was scheduled to face Mateusz Rębecki on January 14, 2023, at UFC Fight Night 217. However, Morales withdrew the fight for Undisclosed reasons.

Morales faced Chris Duncan, replacing Michal Figlak, on March 18, 2023, at UFC 286. He lost the fight via split decision.

On June 5, 2023, news surfaced that Morales had fought out his contract and the organization opted not to renew it.

== Mixed martial arts record ==
Professional record breakdown
15 matches	11 wins	4 losses
By knockout	2	1
By submission	5	1
By decision	4	2

Res.	Record	Opponent	Method	Event	Date	Round	Time	Location	Notes
Loss	11–4	Chris Duncan	Decision (split)	UFC 286	March 18, 2023	3	5:00	London, England	
Loss	11–3	Uroš Medić	TKO (punches)	UFC Fight Night: Holm vs. Vieira	May 21, 2022	2	3:05	Las Vegas, Nevada, United States	Return to Lightweight.
Loss	11–2	Jonathan Pearce	Submission (rear-naked choke)	UFC 266	September 25, 2021	2	3:31	Las Vegas, Nevada, United States	
Win	11–1	Shane Young	Decision (unanimous)	UFC 260	March 27, 2021	3	5:00	Las Vegas, Nevada, United States	
Loss	10–1	Giga Chikadze	Decision (unanimous)	UFC Fight Night: Moraes vs. Sandhagen	October 11, 2020	3	5:00	Abu Dhabi, United Arab Emirates	Featherweight debut.
Win	10–0	Gabriel Benítez	Decision (unanimous)	UFC Fight Night: Smith vs. Teixeira	May 13, 2020	3	5:00	Jacksonville, Florida, United States	
Win	9–0	Ma Dong-hyun	Decision (unanimous)	UFC Fight Night: Edgar vs. The Korean Zombie	December 21, 2019	3	5:00	Busan, South Korea	
Win	8–0	Harvey Park	TKO (leg kicks and punches)	Dana White's Contender Series 23	August 6, 2019	2	1:06	Las Vegas, Nevada, United States	
Win	7–0	Troy Nawrocki	KO (punches)	Bellator 204	August 17, 2018	1	0:58	Sioux Falls, South Dakota, United States	
Win	6–0	Jhan Zuniga	Submission (rear-naked choke)	Latin American Championship	February 20, 2016	1	3:14	Valencia, Venezuela	
Win	5–0	Danilo Padilha da Silva	Decision (unanimous)	Fight Time 25	May 29, 2015	3	5:00	Miami, Florida, United States	
Win	4–0	Stefan Werleman	Submission (rear-naked choke)	Eye 4N Eye Fighting Championships	September 26, 2014	1	0:49	Oranjestad, Aruba	
Win	3–0	Wilmer Gonzalez	Submission (guillotine choke)	Supremacia MMA 2	October 27, 2012	1	1:54	Caracas, Venezuela	
Win	2–0	Jesus Rodriguez	Submission (armbar)	Pugilatus MMA	August 18, 2012	1	3:34	Los Teques, Venezuela	
Win	1–0	Angel Brito	Submission	GOV 2	November 26, 2011	1	N/A	Maturín, Venezuela	

== See also ==
- List of male mixed martial artists
