= Jeremiah Wells =

American mixed martial arts fighter

- Born: Jeremiah C. Wells; October 30, 1986 (age 39); West Hazleton, Pennsylvania, U.S.
- Height: 5 ft 9 in (175 cm)
- Weight: 170 lb (77 kg; 12 st 2 lb)
- Division: Welterweight
- Reach: 74 in (188 cm)
- Fighting out of: Philadelphia, Pennsylvania, U.S.
- Team: Renzo Gracie Philly; Extreme Evolution Fight Camp
- Rank: Black belt in Brazilian Jiu-Jitsu
- Years active: 2012–present

Mixed martial arts record
- Total: 19
- Wins: 14
- By knockout: 5
- By submission: 5
- By decision: 4
- Losses: 4
- By submission: 1
- By decision: 3
- Draws: 1

Other information
- Mixed martial arts record from Sherdog

Jeremiah C. Wells (born October 30, 1986) is an American professional mixed martial artist who competes in the Welterweight division of the Ultimate Fighting Championship.

== Background ==
Wells was born in 1986 in West Hazelton, Pennsylvania, a city of about 25,000, nearby Philadelphia. Growing up a variety of sports, ranging from football, basketball and soccer, he eventually settled into breeding dogs to sell and working at a factory to support his child. He started training MMA at the age of 24 and fell in love with it, pursuing it as a career.

== Mixed martial arts career ==
=== Early career ===
Wells competed as an amateur middleweight from 2011 to 2012, amassing a 2–1 record.

Making his professional MMA debut at PA Cage Fight 14, he scored a first-round TKO against Quinton Stephens, before submitting his next two opponents, Bradley Desir and Scott Hudson, via second round rear-naked chokes. He would then compete for the Cage Fury FC Welterweight Championship against Emmanuel Wallo at CFFC 56, which he would lose by unanimous decision. After drawing with Bassil Hafez at CFFC 69, Wells would rebound, chocking out Gary Balletto Jr in the first round at CES MMA 49. Wells would then defeat The Ultimate Fighter season 16 alumni Jon Manley via unanimous decision at CES MMA 50, before winning by unanimous decision against Jason Norwood in the main event of CES MMA 52 for the CES MMA Welterweight Championship. Losing the championship in the next bout at CES MMA 52 against future Bellator fighter Vinicius de Jesus via unanimous decision, Wells knocked out Mumia Abu Dey-Ali in the first round att CFFC 76. In his final bout before the UFC, Wells submitted Marco Smallman in the second round at CFFC 78.

=== Ultimate Fighting Championship ===
In his UFC debut, Wells faced Warlley Alves, replacing Ramazan Emeev, on June 26, 2021, at UFC Fight Night 190. Wells won the fight via knockout in round two.

Wells was scheduled to face Jake Matthews on December 4, 2021, at UFC on ESPN 31. However, just hours before the event the bout was cancelled after one of Wells's cornermen tested positive for COVID-19.

His second fight in UFC, Wells faced Mike Mathetha, replacing Orion Cosce on February 12, 2022, at UFC 271. He won the fight via technical submission in round one.

Wells faced Court McGee on June 18, 2022, at UFC on ESPN 37. He won the bout in the first round, knocking out McGee with a left hook. This win earned him his first Performance of the Night award.

Wells faced Matthew Semelsberger on April 22, 2023, at UFC Fight Night 222. He won the back-and-forth fight via split decision.

Wells faced Carlston Harris on August 5, 2023, at UFC on ESPN 50. He lost the bout in the third round, getting choked out via anaconda choke.

Wells faced Max Griffin on February 10, 2024 at UFC Fight Night 236. He lost the bout by split decision.

Wells was scheduled to face Niko Price on June 1, 2024 at UFC 302. However, due to an injury, Wells was replaced by Alex Morono.

Wells was scheduled to face promotional newcomer Andreas Gustafsson on May 31, 2025 at UFC on ESPN 68. However on May 20, 2025, Wells withdrew due to an injury and was replaced by Trevin Giles in a catchweight bout.

Wells faced Themba Gorimbo on November 1, 2025 at UFC Fight Night 263. He won the fight by unanimous decision.

Wells was scheduled to face Nicolas Dalby on May 16, 2026 at UFC Fight Night 276. However on May 7, Dalby pulled out due to an undisclosed injury.

Wells faced Myktybek Orolbai on August 15, 2026, at UFC 330. He won the fight via a ninja choke submission in the third round. This fight earned him a $100,000 Performance of the Night award.

== Championships and accomplishments ==
- Cage Fury Fighting Championships
  - Cage Fury FC Welterweight Championship (one time; former)
- CES MMA
  - CES MMA Welterweight Championship (one time; former)
- Ultimate Fighting Championship
  - Performance of the Night (Two times) vs. Court McGee and Myktybek Orolbai

== Mixed martial arts record ==
Professional record breakdown
19 matches	14 wins	4 losses
By knockout	5	0
By submission	5	1
By decision	4	3
Draws	1	

Res.	Record	Opponent	Method	Event	Date	Round	Time	Location	Notes
Win	14–4–1	Myktybek Orolbai	Technical Submission (ninja choke)	UFC 330	August 15, 2026	3	1:24	Philadelphia, Pennsylvania, United States	Performance of the Night.
Win	13–4–1	Themba Gorimbo	Decision (unanimous)	UFC Fight Night: Garcia vs. Onama	November 1, 2025	3	5:00	Las Vegas, Nevada, United States	
Loss	12–4–1	Max Griffin	Decision (split)	UFC Fight Night: Hermansson vs. Pyfer	February 10, 2024	3	5:00	Las Vegas, Nevada, United States	
Loss	12–3–1	Carlston Harris	Technical Submission (anaconda choke)	UFC on ESPN: Sandhagen vs. Font	August 5, 2023	3	1:50	Nashville, Tennessee, United States	
Win	12–2–1	Matthew Semelsberger	Decision (split)	UFC Fight Night: Pavlovich vs. Blaydes	April 22, 2023	3	5:00	Las Vegas, Nevada, United States	
Win	11–2–1	Court McGee	KO (punch)	UFC on ESPN: Kattar vs. Emmett	June 18, 2022	1	1:34	Austin, Texas, United States	Performance of the Night.
Win	10–2–1	Mike Mathetha	Technical Submission (rear-naked choke)	UFC 271	February 12, 2022	1	4:38	Houston, Texas, United States	
Win	9–2–1	Warlley Alves	KO (punches)	UFC Fight Night: Gane vs. Volkov	June 26, 2021	2	0:30	Las Vegas, Nevada, United States	
Win	8–2–1	Marco Smallman	Submission (rear-naked choke)	Cage Fury FC 78	September 21, 2019	2	2:51	Philadelphia, Pennsylvania, United States	Won the vacant Cage Fury FC Welterweight Championship.
Win	7–2–1	Mumia Abu Dey-Ali	KO (punch)	Cage Fury FC 76	June 14, 2019	1	0:22	Bensalem, Pennsylvania, United States	
Loss	6–2–1	Vinicius de Jesus	Decision (unanimous)	CES MMA 55	March 29, 2019	5	5:00	Hartford, Connecticut, United States	Lost the CES Welterweight Championship.
Win	6–1–1	Jason Norwood	Decision (unanimous)	CES MMA 52	August 17, 2018	5	5:00	Philadelphia, Pennsylvania, United States	Won the vacant CES Welterweight Championship.
Win	5–1–1	Jon Manley	Decision (unanimous)	CES MMA 50	June 15, 2018	3	5:00	Lincoln, Rhode Island, United States	
Win	4–1–1	Gary Balletto Jr.	KO (punch)	CES MMA 49	April 6, 2018	1	0:57	Lincoln, Rhode Island, United States	
Draw	3–1–1	Bassil Hafez	Draw (split)	Cage Fury FC 68	October 21, 2017	3	5:00	Atlantic City, New Jersey, United States	
Loss	3–1	Emmanuel Walo	Decision (unanimous)	Cage Fury FC 56	February 27, 2016	5	5:00	Philadelphia, Pennsylvania, United States	For the vacant Cage Fury FC Welterweight Championship.
Win	3–0	Bradley Desir	Submission (rear-naked choke)	Cage Fury FC 44	December 13, 2014	2	4:35	Bethlehem, Pennsylvania, United States	
Win	2–0	Scott Hudson	Submission (rear-naked choke)	PA Cage Fight 16	June 15, 2013	2	0:56	Scranton, Pennsylvania, United States	Welterweight debut.
Win	1–0	Quinton Stephens	TKO (punches)	PA Cage Fight 14	October 13, 2012	1	4:40	Hazleton, Pennsylvania, United States	Catchweight (175 lb) bout.

== See also ==
- List of current UFC fighters
- List of male mixed martial artists
