= Myktybek Orolbai =

Kyrgyz mixed martial artist (born 1998)

- Born: Myktybek Orolbai Uulu; February 10, 1998 (age 28); Kara-Suu, Osh Region, Kyrgyzstan
- Native name: Мыктыбек Оролбай уулу
- Height: 5 ft 10 in (1.78 m)
- Weight: 170 lb (77 kg; 12 st 2 lb)
- Division: Lightweight (2018–2021, 2024); Welterweight (2021–2023, 2025–present)
- Reach: 74 in (188 cm)
- Fighting out of: Osh, Kyrgyzstan; Sacramento, California, U.S.
- Team: Team Uluu Kyrgyz; Team Alpha Male
- Years active: 2018–present

Mixed martial arts record
- Total: 20
- Wins: 16
- By knockout: 7
- By submission: 6
- By decision: 3
- Losses: 3
- By submission: 1
- By decision: 2
- Draws: 1

Other information
- Mixed martial arts record from Sherdog

Myktybek Orolbai Uulu (Kyrgyz: Мыктыбек Оролбай уулу; born February 10, 1998) is a Kyrgyz professional mixed martial artist. He currently competes in the Welterweight division of the Ultimate Fighting Championship (UFC).

== Background ==
Orolbai was born at the mountain village of Kyzyl-Suu in Kara-Suu, Osh Region, Kyrgyzstan. Orolbai has been interested in sports and mixed martial arts since childhood. In 2016, he went to Osh and entered the Osh State Law College. In his second year, he trained at the Uulu Kyrgyz Team.

== Mixed martial arts career ==
=== Early career ===
During 2018–2021, Orolbai completing in Kyrgyzstan regional promotion. He amassed a record of 8–1–1 before signed with Legacy Fighting Alliance. Orolbai was able to win three fights in a row in the promotion before he signed with the Ultimate Fighting Championship.

=== Ultimate Fighting Championship ===
Replacing Jonny Parsons, who withdrew for unknown reasons, Orolbai made his UFC debut against Uroš Medić on November 18, 2023, at UFC Fight Night 232. He won the fight via a neck crank in round two.

Moving down to lightweight, Orolbai faced Elves Brener on May 4, 2024, at UFC 301. Despite being deducted one point due to grabbing the fence, Orolbai won the fight via unanimous decision.

Orolbai faced Mateusz Rębecki on October 26, 2024, at UFC 308. Despite slated as a lightweight bout, it was changed to a 160 pounds catchweight. He lost the fight via split decision. The bout was earned his Fight of the Night bonus.

Orolbai faced Tofiq Musayev on June 21, 2025, at UFC on ABC 8. Despite slated as a lightweight, it was changed to a 165 pounds catchweight bout. Initially, there was no indication of why and when the change was made, but both competitors exceeded the lightweight non-title fight limit during the weigh-ins, with Musayev weighing 163 pounds and Orolbai 165 pounds. He won the fight via a kimura in round one. Subsequently, it was revealed after the event that the change was related to Orolbai not being able to cut all the weight during fight week, therefore moving up the weight limit for the bout.

Returning to welterweight, Orolbai faced Jack Hermansson on November 22, 2025, at UFC Fight Night 265. He won the fight by knockout in the first round.

Orolbai faced Chris Curtis on March 14, 2026, at UFC Fight Night 269. He won the fight by unanimous decision. He completed 19 takedowns in the fight, setting a new UFC welterweight record.

Orolbai faced Jeremiah Wells on August 15, 2026, at UFC 330. He lost the fight via a ninja choke submission in the third round.

== Personal life ==
Orolbai has a law degree from Osh State University.

== Championships and accomplishments ==
- Ultimate Fighting Championship
  - Fight of the Night (One time) vs. Mateusz Rębecki
  - Third most takedowns landed in a bout (19) (vs. Chris Curtis)
    - Second most takedowns landed in a three-round bout (19) (vs. Chris Curtis)
    - Most takedowns landed in a UFC Welterweight bout (19) (vs. Chris Curtis)
- Sulukta Fighting Championship
  - Sulukta FC Welterweight Championship (One time)
  - Sulukta FC Welterweight Grand Prix winner
- MMA Mania
  - 2024 Fight of the Year vs. Mateusz Rębecki at UFC 308

== Mixed martial arts record ==
Professional record breakdown
20 matches	16 wins	3 losses
By knockout	7	0
By submission	6	1
By decision	3	2
Draws	1	

Res.	Record	Opponent	Method	Event	Date	Round	Time	Location	Notes
Loss	16–3–1	Jeremiah Wells	Technical Submission (ninja choke)	UFC 330	August 15, 2026	3	1:24	Philadelphia, Pennsylvania, United States	
Win	16–2–1	Chris Curtis	Decision (unanimous)	UFC Fight Night: Emmett vs. Vallejos	March 14, 2026	3	5:00	Las Vegas, Nevada, United States	
Win	15–2–1	Jack Hermansson	KO (punch)	UFC Fight Night: Tsarukyan vs. Hooker	November 22, 2025	1	2:46	Al Rayyan, Qatar	Return to Welterweight.
Win	14–2–1	Tofiq Musayev	Submission (kimura)	UFC on ABC: Hill vs. Rountree Jr.	June 21, 2025	1	4:35	Baku, Azerbaijan	Catchweight (165 lb) bout.
Loss	13–2–1	Mateusz Rębecki	Decision (split)	UFC 308	October 26, 2024	3	5:00	Abu Dhabi, United Arab Emirates	Catchweight (160 lb) bout. Fight of the Night.
Win	13–1–1	Elves Brener	Decision (unanimous)	UFC 301	May 4, 2024	3	5:00	Rio de Janeiro, Brazil	Return to Lightweight. Orolbai was deducted one point in round 3 due to grabbing the fence.
Win	12–1–1	Uroš Medić	Submission (neck crank)	UFC Fight Night: Allen vs. Craig	November 18, 2023	2	4:12	Las Vegas, Nevada, United States	
Win	11–1–1	Hayward Charles	KO (punch)	LFA 170	October 27, 2023	2	0:41	Vail, Colorado, United States	
Win	10–1–1	Gláucio Eliziário	TKO (punches)	LFA 164	August 4, 2023	2	1:33	El Paso, Texas, United States	
Win	9–1–1	Jalin Fuller	Decision (unanimous)	LFA 131	May 6, 2022	3	5:00	Oshkosh, Wisconsin, United States	
Win	8–1–1	Kaldyadis Taalaybek Uulu	TKO (retirement)	Sulukta FC: Fight Night Grand Prix	November 26, 2021	4	4:00	Sülüktü, Kyrgyzstan	Won the Sulukta FC Welterweight Grand Prix and the Sulukta FC Welterweight Championship.
Win	7–1–1	Mashrapjon Sabirov	TKO (punches)	Sulukta FC: Fight Night Grand Prix	November 26, 2021	1	3:24	Sülüktü, Kyrgyzstan	Welterweight debut. Sulukta FC Welterweight Grand Prix Semifinal.
Win	6–1–1	Peyman Haciev	TKO (punches)	Open FC 8	August 14, 2021	1	2:30	Bishkek, Kyrgyzstan	
Loss	5–1–1	Khalid Satuev	Decision (unanimous)	ACA Young Eagles 15	December 19, 2020	3	5:00	Tolstoy-Yurt, Russia	
Win	5–0–1	Shamil Mutalimov	TKO (punches)	Road Fighting Championship Russia 6	June 22, 2019	1	3:37	Bishkek, Kyrgyzstan	
Win	4–0–1	Farukh Kodirov	Submission (rear-naked choke)	WEF Selection 22	March 10, 2019	1	1:04	Arashan, Kyrgyzstan	
Draw	3–0–1	Fakhreddin Myrzadavlatov	Draw (unanimous)	WEF Selection 20	January 20, 2019	5	5:00	Kara-Suu, Kyrgyzstan	For the vacant WEF Lightweight Championship.
Win	3–0	Saidal Khazmuradov	Submission (rear-naked choke)	Professional Fighters League Kyrgyzstan 1	November 25, 2018	1	2:15	Osh, Kyrgyzstan	
Win	2–0	Shakhzod Kholmatov	Submission (rear-naked choke)	WEF ProfFight 27	September 20, 2018	1	3:10	Kara-Kulja, Kyrgyzstan	
Win	1–0	Eldiyar Toobaev	Submission (rear-naked choke)	WEF ProfFight 25	August 12, 2018	1	3:41	Kara-Suu, Kyrgyzstan	Lightweight debut.

== See also ==
- List of current UFC fighters
- List of male mixed martial artists
