= Joel Álvarez =

Spanish mixed martial arts fighter (born 1993)

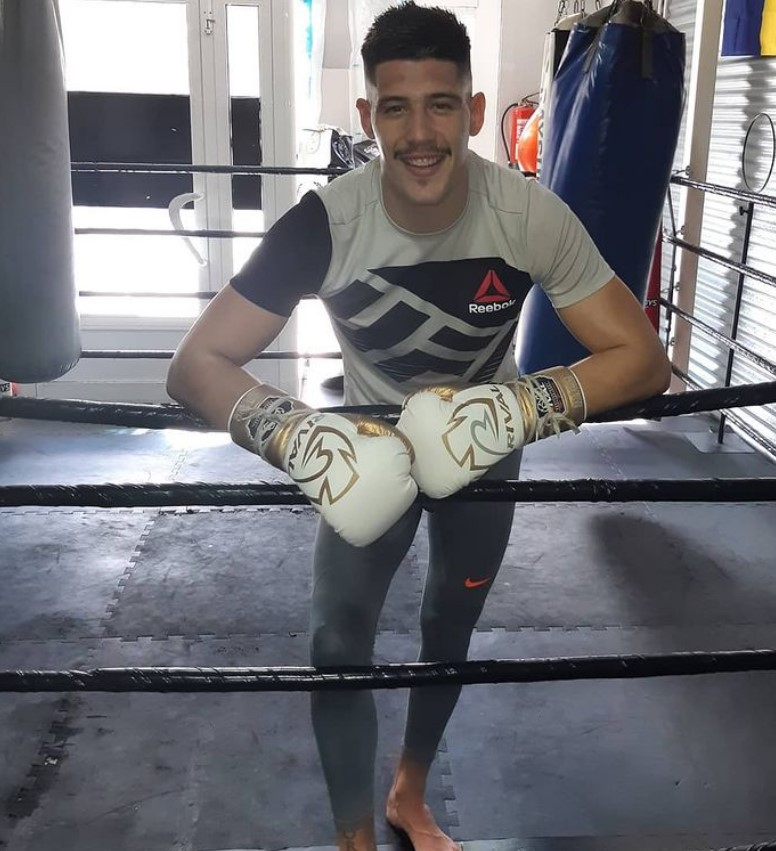
- Álvarez in 2022
- Born: Joel Álvarez González; March 2, 1993 (age 33); Gijón, Asturias, Spain
- Other names: El Fenómeno ('The Phenomenon')
- Height: 6 ft 3 in (1.91 m)
- Weight: 155 lb (70 kg; 11 st 1 lb)
- Division: Lightweight; Welterweight
- Reach: 77 in (196 cm)
- Fighting out of: Gijón, Asturias, Spain
- Team: Bandog Fight Club
- Rank: Brown belt in Brazilian Jiu-Jitsu
- Years active: 2013–present

Mixed martial arts record
- Total: 28
- Wins: 23
- By knockout: 5
- By submission: 17
- By decision: 1
- Losses: 5
- By knockout: 2
- By submission: 1
- By decision: 2

Other information
- Mixed martial arts record from Sherdog

Joel Álvarez González (born March 2, 1993) is a Spanish professional mixed martial artist. He currently competes in the Welterweight division of the Ultimate Fighting Championship (UFC).

== Early life ==
Álvarez was born in Gijón, Spain, on March 2, 1993, and spent his childhood in the Polígono de Pumarín neighbourhood. When he was 18 years old, he began to practice mixed martial arts at local gym Centro Deportivo Tíbet. Later, he made his debut in several regional level tournaments.

== Mixed martial arts career ==
=== Early career ===
A professional competitor since 2013, Álvarez fought primarily in his native Spain and garnered a record of 15 wins against 1 loss in the first five years of his career. He was undefeated in the Spanish promotion Ansgar Fighting League (AFL), where he was the lightweight champion, after defeating Brazil's Júlio César Alves by submission in the second round.

=== Ultimate Fighting Championship ===
In his debut, Álvarez faced Damir Ismagulov on February 23, 2019, at UFC Fight Night 145. He lost the fight via unanimous decision.

Álvarez faced Danilo Belluardo on June 1, 2019, at UFC Fight Night 153. He won the fight via TKO in the second round.

Álvarez faced Joseph Duffy on July 15, 2020, at UFC Fight Night 172. He won the fight via a submission in round one.

Álvarez faced Alexander Yakovlev on October 24, 2020, at UFC 254. At the weigh-ins, Álvarez weighed in at 159.5 pounds, three and a half pounds over the lightweight non-title fight limit. The bout proceeded at catchweight and he was fined 30% of his purse, which went to his opponent Yakovlev. He won the fight via an armbar submission in round one.

Álvarez was scheduled to face Christos Giagos on May 15, 2021, at UFC 262. However, Álvarez was removed from the bout in early May due to alleged visa issues that restricted his travel, and was replaced by Sean Soriano.

Álvarez faced Thiago Moisés on November 13, 2021, at UFC Fight Night 197. At the weigh-ins, Álvarez weighed in at 157.5 pounds, one and a half pounds over the lightweight non-title fight limit. The bout proceeded at a catchweight with Álvarez fined 30% of his purse, which went to Moisés. Álvarez won the fight via technical knockout in round one.

Álvarez faced Arman Tsarukyan on February 26, 2022, at UFC Fight Night 202. He lost the bout via ground and pound TKO in the second round.

Álvarez was scheduled to face Zubaira Tukhugov on February 14, 2023, at UFC 284. However, Álvarez withrew from the event for undisclosed reasons and he was replaced by promotional newcomer Elves Brener.

Álvarez faced Marc Diakiese on July 22, 2023, at UFC Fight Night 224. He won the fight via brabo choke submission in the second round.

Álvarez was scheduled to face Ľudovít Klein on March 2, 2024, at UFC Fight Night 238. However, Álvarez withdrew for unknown reasons and was replaced by AJ Cunningham.

Álvarez was scheduled to face Mateusz Rębecki on April 27, 2024, at UFC on ESPN 55. However, Álvarez pulled out due to undisclosed reasons.

Álvarez faced Elves Brener on August 3, 2024, at UFC on ABC 7. He won the fight by technical knockout as a result of knees and punches in the third round. This fight earned him a Performance of the Night award.

Álvarez faced Drakkar Klose on December 14, 2024 at UFC on ESPN 63. He won the fight by knockout via a flying knee and punches in the first round.

Álvarez was scheduled to face Benoît Saint Denis on May 10, 2025 at UFC 315. However, Álvarez withdrew from the bout due to a hand injury and was replaced by Kyle Prepolec.

Álvarez was reportedly scheduled to face Grant Dawson on August 2, 2025 at UFC on ESPN 71. However, for unknown reasons, the bout was not formally announced.

Álvarez faced Vicente Luque, replacing an injured Santiago Ponzinibbio, on October 11, 2025, at UFC Fight Night 261. He won the fight by unanimous decision.

Álvarez faced Yaroslav Amosov on May 9, 2026 at UFC 328. He lost the fight via an arm-triangle choke in round two.

On two weeks notice and replacing Geoff Neal who withdrew for undisclosed reasons, Álvarez faced Chidi Njokuani on August 15, 2026 at UFC 330. Álvarez lost the fight by unanimous decision.

== Championships and accomplishments ==
- Ultimate Fighting Championship
  - Performance of the Night (One time) vs. Elves Brener
- Ansgar Fighting League
  - AFL Lightweight Championship (One time)

== Mixed martial arts record ==
Professional record breakdown
28 matches	23 wins	5 losses
By knockout	5	2
By submission	17	1
By decision	1	2

Res.	Record	Opponent	Method	Event	Date	Round	Time	Location	Notes
Loss	23–5	Chidi Njokuani	Decision (unanimous)	UFC 330	August 15, 2026	3	5:00	Philadelphia, Pennsylvania, United States	
Loss	23–4	Yaroslav Amosov	Submission (arm-triangle choke)	UFC 328	May 9, 2026	2	1:13	Newark, New Jersey, United States	
Win	23–3	Vicente Luque	Decision (unanimous)	UFC Fight Night: Oliveira vs. Gamrot	October 11, 2025	3	5:00	Rio de Janeiro, Brazil	Welterweight debut.
Win	22–3	Drakkar Klose	KO (flying knee and punches)	UFC on ESPN: Covington vs. Buckley	December 14, 2024	1	2:48	Tampa, Florida, United States	
Win	21–3	Elves Brener	TKO (knees and punches)	UFC on ABC: Sandhagen vs. Nurmagomedov	August 3, 2024	3	3:36	Abu Dhabi, United Arab Emirates	Performance of the Night.
Win	20–3	Marc Diakiese	Submission (brabo choke)	UFC Fight Night: Aspinall vs. Tybura	July 22, 2023	2	4:26	London, England	
Loss	19–3	Arman Tsarukyan	TKO (punches)	UFC Fight Night: Makhachev vs. Green	February 26, 2022	2	1:57	Las Vegas, Nevada, United States	
Win	19–2	Thiago Moisés	TKO (elbows and punches)	UFC Fight Night: Holloway vs. Rodríguez	November 13, 2021	1	3:01	Las Vegas, Nevada, United States	Catchweight (157.5 lb) bout; Álvarez missed weight.
Win	18–2	Alexander Yakovlev	Submission (armbar)	UFC 254	October 24, 2020	1	3:00	Abu Dhabi, United Arab Emirates	Catchweight (159.5 lb) bout; Álvarez missed weight.
Win	17–2	Joseph Duffy	Submission (guillotine choke)	UFC Fight Night: Figueiredo vs. Benavidez 2	July 19, 2020	1	2:25	Abu Dhabi, United Arab Emirates	
Win	16–2	Danilo Belluardo	TKO (punches)	UFC Fight Night: Gustafsson vs. Smith	June 1, 2019	2	2:22	Stockholm, Sweden	
Loss	15–2	Damir Ismagulov	Decision (unanimous)	UFC Fight Night: Błachowicz vs. Santos	February 23, 2019	3	5:00	Prague, Czech Republic	
Win	15–1	Radu Maxim	Submission (triangle choke)	Ansgar Fighting League 17	November 24, 2018	1	4:29	Langreo, Spain	Won the AFL Lightweight Championship.
Win	14–1	Julio Cesar Alves	Submission (brabo choke)	Ansgar Fighting League 16	September 29, 2018	2	1:02	Valladolid, Spain	Catchweight (161 lb) bout.
Win	13–1	Alexandre Ribeiro	Submission (triangle choke)	Ansgar Fighting League 15	May 5, 2018	1	4:17	San Sebastián, Spain	
Win	12–1	Kevin Daniel Delgado	Submission (guillotine choke)	Ansgar Fighting League 14	March 17, 2018	1	0:26	Las Palmas, Spain	
Win	11–1	Francisco Gonzalez	Submission (guillotine choke)	Ansgar Fighting League 13	October 14, 2017	1	1:59	Gijón, Spain	
Win	10–1	Jekson Poleza	Submission (triangle choke)	Ansgar Fighting League 12	June 3, 2017	1	1:57	Barcelona, Spain	
Win	9–1	Anthony Muller	TKO (punches)	Fight Night Series 2	March 18, 2017	1	0:33	Montreux, Switzerland	
Win	8–1	Moncef Ed Doukani	Submission (anaconda choke)	MMA Casino Fights: Álvarez vs. Ed Doukani	October 8, 2016	1	1:45	Gijón, Spain	
Win	7–1	Jose Luis Bravo	Submission (triangle choke)	MMA Casino Fights: Álvarez vs. Bravo	July 8, 2016	1	0:49	Gijón, Spain	
Win	6–1	Carlos Villar	Submission (armbar)	MMA España: Bandog Challenge 3	June 12, 2015	1	4:20	Gijón, Spain	
Loss	5–1	Ali Abdulkhalikov	KO (spinning heel kick)	M-1 Challenge 56	April 10, 2015	1	0:34	Moscow, Russia	Return to Lightweight.
Win	5–0	Graham Turner	Submission (guillotine choke)	Rage in the Cage 3	March 21, 2015	3	N/A	Paisley, Scotland	Featherweight bout.
Win	4–0	Jose Luis Bravo	Submission (triangle choke)	MMA España: Desafio Burgos Profight 2015	March 7, 2015	1	3:20	Burgos, Spain	
Win	3–0	Helson Henriques	Submission (anaconda choke)	International Pro Combat 6	January 26, 2015	1	1:23	Lisbon, Portugal	
Win	2–0	Hicham Rachid	Submission (triangle choke)	MMA España: Bandog Challenge 2	April 12, 2014	1	2:01	Gijón, Spain	
Win	1–0	Aratz Garmendia	Submission (triangle choke)	Txurdinaga Sutan: Pro Boxing & MMA	December 28, 2013	1	3:19	Bilbao, Spain	

== See also ==
- List of current UFC fighters
- List of male mixed martial artists
