= UFC 286 =

2023 mixed martial arts event

UFC 286: Edwards vs. Usman 3
- The poster for UFC 286: Edwards vs. Usman 3
- Promotion: Ultimate Fighting Championship
- Date: March 18, 2023
- Venue: The O_{2} Arena
- City: London, England, United Kingdom
- Attendance: 17,588
- Total gate: $8,580,000

Event chronology
UFC Fight Night: Yan vs. Dvalishvili	UFC 286: Edwards vs. Usman 3	UFC on ESPN: Vera vs. Sandhagen

UFC 286: Edwards vs. Usman 3 was a mixed martial arts event produced by the Ultimate Fighting Championship that took place on March 18, 2023, at The O_{2} Arena in London, England.

== Background ==
A UFC Welterweight Championship trilogy bout between current champion Leon Edwards and former champion (also The Ultimate Fighter: American Top Team vs. Blackzilians welterweight winner) Kamaru Usman headlined the event. The pairing first met at UFC on Fox: dos Anjos vs. Cowboy 2 in December 2015, where Usman won by unanimous decision. Their second meeting took place at UFC 278 in August 2022, where Edwards won the title by knockout in the fifth round. Former interim champion Colby Covington served as back up and potential replacement for this fight.

A lightweight bout between Michał Figlak and Chris Duncan was scheduled for the event. However, Figlak was forced to withdraw from the event citing injury and was replaced by Omar Morales.

A featherweight bout between Nathaniel Wood and Lerone Murphy was scheduled for the event. However, Wood was forced to withdraw from the event due to a leg injury. He was replaced by the LFA Featherweight Champion Gabriel Santos.

A welterweight bout between Gunnar Nelson and Daniel Rodriguez was scheduled for this event. However, Rodriguez withdrew due to undisclosed reasons and was replaced by Bryan Barberena.

At the weigh-ins, Malcolm Gordon weighed in at 129.5 pounds, three and a half pounds over the flyweight non-title fight limit. His bout proceeded at catchweight and he was fined 30% of his purse which went to his opponent Jake Hadley.

During the event's broadcast, former UFC Middleweight Champion Anderson Silva was announced as the next "pioneer wing" (as his career started prior to the implementation of the Unified Rules of MMA) UFC Hall of Fame inductee. Silva holds the record for longest championship reign (2,457 days) in UFC history and the longest win streak (16) in the organization's history.

== Results ==
Main card
Weight class				Method	Round	Time	Notes
Welterweight	Leon Edwards (c)	def.	Kamaru Usman	Decision (majority) (48–46, 48–46, 47–47)	5	5:00	(Note: For the UFC Welterweight Championship. Edwards was deducted 1 point in round 3 due to grabbing the fence.)
Lightweight	Justin Gaethje	def.	Rafael Fiziev	Decision (majority) (29–28, 29–28, 28–28)	3	5:00
Welterweight	Gunnar Nelson	def.	Bryan Barberena	Submission (armbar)	1	4:51
Women's Flyweight	Jennifer Maia	def.	Casey O'Neill	Decision (unanimous) (30–27, 29–28, 29–28)	3	5:00
Middleweight	Marvin Vettori	def.	Roman Dolidze	Decision (unanimous) (29–28, 29–28, 30–27)	3	5:00
Preliminary card (ESPNews / ESPN+)
Featherweight	Jack Shore	def.	Makwan Amirkhani	Submission (rear-naked choke)	2	4:27
Lightweight	Chris Duncan	def.	Omar Morales	Decision (split) (27–30, 29–28, 29–28)	3	5:00
Lightweight	Yanal Ashmouz	def.	Sam Patterson	KO (punches)	1	1:15
Flyweight	Muhammad Mokaev	def.	Jafel Filho	Submission (neck crank)	3	4:32
Early preliminary card (ESPN+ / UFC Fight Pass)
Featherweight	Lerone Murphy	def.	Gabriel Santos	Decision (split) (28–29, 29–28, 29–28)	3	5:00
Middleweight	Christian Leroy Duncan	def.	Duško Todorović	TKO (knee injury)	1	1:52
Catchweight (129.5 lb)	Jake Hadley	def.	Malcolm Gordon	TKO (punches)	1	1:01
Women's Flyweight	Joanne Wood	def.	Luana Carolina	Decision (split) (28–29, 30–27, 29–28)	3	5:00
Lightweight	Jai Herbert	vs.	Ľudovít Klein	Draw (majority) (29–27, 28–28, 28–28)	3	5:00	(Note: Herbert was deducted 1 point in round 3 due to multiple groin strikes.)
Women's Flyweight	Veronica Hardy	def.	Juliana Miller	Decision (unanimous) (30–27, 30–27, 30–27)	3	5:00

== Bonus awards ==
The following fighters received $50,000 bonuses.

- Fight of the Night: Justin Gaethje vs. Rafael Fiziev
- Performance of the Night: Gunnar Nelson and Jake Hadley

== See also ==
- List of UFC events
- List of current UFC fighters
- 2023 in UFC
