= Chris Duncan (fighter) =

Scottish mixed martial artist (born 1993)

- Born: May 10, 1993 (age 33); Alloa, Scotland
- Other names: Spruce
- Height: 5 ft 10 in (1.78 m)
- Weight: 156 lb (71 kg; 11 st 2 lb)
- Division: Lightweight
- Reach: 71.5 in (182 cm)
- Fighting out of: Alloa, Scotland
- Team: American Top Team
- Years active: 2014-present

Mixed martial arts record
- Total: 19
- Wins: 16
- By knockout: 7
- By submission: 4
- By decision: 5
- Losses: 3
- By knockout: 1
- By submission: 2

Other information
- Mixed martial arts record from Sherdog

Chris Duncan (born May 10, 1993) is a Scottish mixed martial artist who competes in the Lightweight division of the UFC.

== Background ==
Duncan was born in Alloa, Scotland, United Kingdom on May 10, 1993. He was nicknamed “Podgy” as a kid, due to him being overweight. However after watching MMA on TV when he was young, he was then motivated to change his physical shape. Before becoming a full time fighter Duncan attended agricultural college and worked as a shepherd in the Scottish Highlands.

His mother died when he was preparing for his first amateur fight; specifically, on the day of the weigh-ins for the fight. Despite that, Duncan still fought. Her death had a major impact on his path in MMA, he has cited it as a motivation for starting his career.

“I started this journey with my mum in mind. What many people don’t know is that my first amateur fight was on the day after my mum passed away—she died during the weigh-ins, but I still fought the next day. I’m built for this; nothing will stop me. People often pull out for lesser reasons, but my mum’s passing on the day of my first MMA fight weigh-ins didn’t deter me.”

== Mixed martial arts career ==
=== Early career ===
Duncan began his MMA career in 2014 April 2014, he compiled an amateur record of 10-1. Duncan then turned pro in 2018 and won his first 7 fights, 6 coming by way of knockout and one via submission. During this period he also won the Ultimate Fight League lightweight championship.

=== Dana White’s Contender Series ===
On October 12, 2021 Duncan fought Viacheslav Borshchev on Dana White's Contender Series. He lost via KO in the second round.

Following a victory on the regional scene, Duncan then got another shot on Dana White's Contender Series on August 2, 2022. He faced Charlie Campbell and won via KO in the first round. His performance won him a UFC contract.

=== Ultimate Fighting Championship ===
Duncan was originally set to face Michal Figlak on March 18, 2023 at UFC 286. Figlak then withdrew from the bout leading to Omar Morales stepping in as the replacement fighter. He won the fight via split decision.

Duncan faced Yanal Ashmouz on July 22, 2023 at UFC Fight Night 224. He won the fight via unanimous decision.

Duncan faced Manuel Torres on February 24, 2024 at UFC Fight Night 237. He lost the fight via first-round submission.

Duncan faced Bolaji Oki on September 28, 2024 at UFC Fight Night 243. He won the fight via submission in the first round. His efforts earned him a Performance of the Night award.

Duncan faced Jordan Vucenic on March 22, 2025 at UFC Fight Night 255. He won the fight via second round submission.

Duncan faced Mateusz Rębecki on August 2, 2025 at UFC on ESPN 71. He won the fight via unanimous decision. This fight earned him a Fight of the Night award.

Duncan faced Terrance McKinney on December 6, 2025 at UFC 323. He won the fight via an anaconda choke submission in the first round.

Duncan faced former UFC Lightweight Championship challenger Renato Moicano on April 4, 2026 in the main event at UFC Fight Night 272. He lost the fight by a face crank submission in the second round.

Duncan faced Drew Dober on November 14, 2026 at UFC 334. He won the fight by unanimous decision.

== Personal life ==
Duncan is married and has a daughter, and in his spare time he works as a personal trainer.

== Championships and achievements ==
- Ultimate Fighting Championship
  - Fight of the Night (One time) vs. Mateusz Rębecki
  - Performance of the Night (One time) vs. Bolaji Oki
  - 2025 August Fight of the Month vs. Mateusz Rębecki
- Ultimate Fight League
  - UFL Lightweight Champion (One time)
- MMA Junkie
  - 2025 August Fight of the Month vs. Mateusz Rębecki
- MMA Fighting
  - 2025 Third Team MMA All-Star

== Mixed martial arts record ==
Professional record breakdown
19 matches	16 wins	3 losses
By knockout	7	1
By submission	4	2
By decision	5	0

Res.	Record	Opponent	Method	Event	Date	Round	Time	Location	Notes
Win	16–3	Drew Dober	Decision (unanimous)	UFC 334	November 14, 2026	3	5:00	New York City, New York, United States	
Loss	15–3	Renato Moicano	Submission (face crank)	UFC Fight Night: Moicano vs. Duncan	April 4, 2026	2	3:14	Las Vegas, Nevada, United States	
Win	15–2	Terrance McKinney	Submission (anaconda choke)	UFC 323	December 6, 2025	1	2:30	Las Vegas, Nevada, United States	
Win	14–2	Mateusz Rębecki	Decision (unanimous)	UFC on ESPN: Taira vs. Park	August 2, 2025	3	5:00	Las Vegas, Nevada, United States	Fight of the Night.
Win	13–2	Jordan Vucenic	Submission (guillotine choke)	UFC Fight Night: Edwards vs. Brady	March 22, 2025	2	3:42	London, England	
Win	12–2	Bolaji Oki	Technical submission (guillotine choke)	UFC Fight Night: Moicano vs. Saint Denis	September 28, 2024	1	3:44	Paris, France	Performance of the Night.
Loss	11–2	Manuel Torres	Submission (rear-naked choke)	UFC Fight Night: Moreno vs. Royval 2	February 24, 2024	1	1:46	Mexico City, Mexico	
Win	11–1	Yanal Ashmouz	Decision (unanimous)	UFC Fight Night: Aspinall vs. Tybura	July 22, 2023	3	5:00	London, England	
Win	10–1	Omar Morales	Decision (split)	UFC 286	March 18, 2023	3	5:00	London, England	
Win	9–1	Charlie Campbell	KO (punches)	Dana White's Contender Series 48	August 2, 2022	1	1:43	Las Vegas, Nevada, United States	Return to Lightweight.
Win	8–1	Jonathan Carlos	Decision (unanimous)	Ultimate Fight League 8	February 5, 2022	3	5:00	London, England	Welterweight debut.
Loss	7–1	Viacheslav Borshchev	KO (punch)	Dana White's Contender Series 43	October 12, 2021	2	0:28	Las Vegas, Nevada, United States	
Win	7–0	Iamik Furtado	TKO (punches)	Bellator 247	October 1, 2020	2	3:58	Milan, Italy	Catchweight (160 lb) bout.
Win	6–0	Mateusz Piskorz	TKO (punches)	Bellator 240	February 22, 2020	2	2:43	Dublin, Ireland	
Win	5–0	Leandro Souza	TKO (punches)	Ultimate Fight League 3	August 4, 2019	1	4:03	Musselburgh, Scotland	Won the inaugural UFL Lightweight Championship.
Win	4–0	Sam Slater	TKO (punches)	Bellator 217	February 23, 2019	1	3:00	Dublin, Ireland	
Win	3–0	Niall Smith	TKO (punches)	On Top 21	November 17, 2018	1	N/A	Linwood, Scotland	
Win	2–0	Steve Moore	TKO (punches)	On Top: Showdown	June 2, 2018	3	N/A	Linwood, Scotland	
Win	1–0	Pietro Colonna	Submission (guillotine choke)	Unity FC 1	April 7, 2018	2	4:47	Darlington, England	Lightweight debut.

== See also ==
- List of current UFC fighters
- List of Dana White's Contender Series alumni
- List of male mixed martial artists
