= UFC Fight Night: Dern vs. Ribas 2 =

Mixed martial arts event in 2025

- The poster for UFC Fight Night: Dern vs. Ribas 2
- Promotion: Ultimate Fighting Championship
- Date: January 11, 2025
- Venue: UFC Apex
- City: Enterprise, Nevada, United States
- Attendance: Not announced

Event chronology
UFC on ESPN: Covington vs. Buckley	UFC Fight Night: Dern vs. Ribas 2	UFC 311: Makhachev vs. Moicano

UFC Fight Night: Dern vs. Ribas 2 (also known as UFC Fight Night 249, UFC Vegas 101 and UFC on ESPN+ 107) was a mixed martial arts event produced by the Ultimate Fighting Championship taking place on January 11, 2025, at the UFC Apex in Enterprise, Nevada, part of the Las Vegas Valley, United States.

== Background ==
A women's strawweight rematch between Mackenzie Dern and Amanda Ribas headlined this event. They were originally scheduled to compete at UFC on ESPN: Covington vs. Buckley on December 14, 2024 but the bout was moved to this event in order to serve as the main event. The duo previously met at UFC Fight Night: Joanna vs. Waterson in October 2019, where Ribas won by unanimous decision.

A women's bantamweight bout between former UFC Women's Featherweight Champion Germaine de Randamie and former LFA Women's Bantamweight Champion Jacqueline Cavalcanti was reportedly scheduled for this event. However, de Randamie announced her retirement and the bout was scrapped.

A welterweight bout between Preston Parsons and Andreas Gustafsson was scheduled for the event. However, Gustafsson withdrew from the fight for unknown reasons and was replaced by Jacobe Smith.

In addition, Nurullo Aliev and Yanal Ashmouz were scheduled to meet in a lightweight bout. However, Ashmouz withdrew for unknown reasons and was replaced by Joe Solecki.

At the weigh-ins, Jose Johnson and Ihor Potieria missed weight. Johnson weighed in at 128.5 pounds, two and a half pounds over the flyweight non-title fight limit. Potieria weighed in at 188 pounds, two pounds over the middleweight non-title fight limit. Both bouts proceeded at catchweight, with Johnson forfeiting 20% of his purse and Potieria forfeiting 25% of his purse, which went to their opponents former LFA Flyweight Champion Felipe Bunes and Marco Tulio, respectively.

== Results ==
Main card (ESPN+)
Weight class				Method	Round	Time	Notes
Women's Strawweight	Mackenzie Dern	def.	Amanda Ribas	Submission (armbar)	3	4:56
Welterweight	Santiago Ponzinibbio	def.	Carlston Harris	TKO (punches)	3	3:13
Middleweight	César Almeida	def.	Abdul Razak Alhassan	KO (punch)	1	4:16
Middleweight	Roman Kopylov	def.	Chris Curtis	TKO (head kick)	3	4:59
Featherweight	Christian Rodriguez	def.	Austin Bashi	Decision (unanimous) (29–28, 29–28, 29–28)	3	5:00
Welterweight	Punahele Soriano	def.	Uroš Medić	KO (punches)	1	0:31
Preliminary card (ESPN+)
Catchweight (128.5 lb)	Felipe Bunes	def.	Jose Johnson	Submission (armbar)	1	2:04
Catchweight (188 lb)	Marco Tulio	def.	Ihor Potieria	TKO (punches)	1	3:04
Lightweight	Thiago Moisés	def.	Trey Ogden	Decision (unanimous) (29–28, 29–28, 29–28)	3	5:00
Welterweight	Jacobe Smith	def.	Preston Parsons	KO (punches)	1	1:13
Women's Flyweight	Ernesta Kareckaitė	def.	Nicolle Caliari	Decision (split) (29–28, 28–29, 29–28)	3	5:00
Light Heavyweight	Bruno Lopes	def.	Magomed Gadzhiyasulov	Decision (unanimous) (29–28, 29–28, 29–28)	3	5:00
Women's Strawweight	Fatima Kline	def.	Victoria Dudakova	TKO (elbows)	2	4:27
Lightweight	Nurullo Aliev	def.	Joe Solecki	Decision (unanimous) (30–27, 30–27, 29–28)	3	5:00

== Bonus awards ==
The following fighters received $50,000 bonuses.

- Fight of the Night: Roman Kopylov vs. Chris Curtis
- Performance of the Night: Mackenzie Dern and César Almeida

== See also ==
- 2025 in UFC
- List of current UFC fighters
- List of UFC events
