= Nicolas Dalby =

Danish mixed martial arts fighter

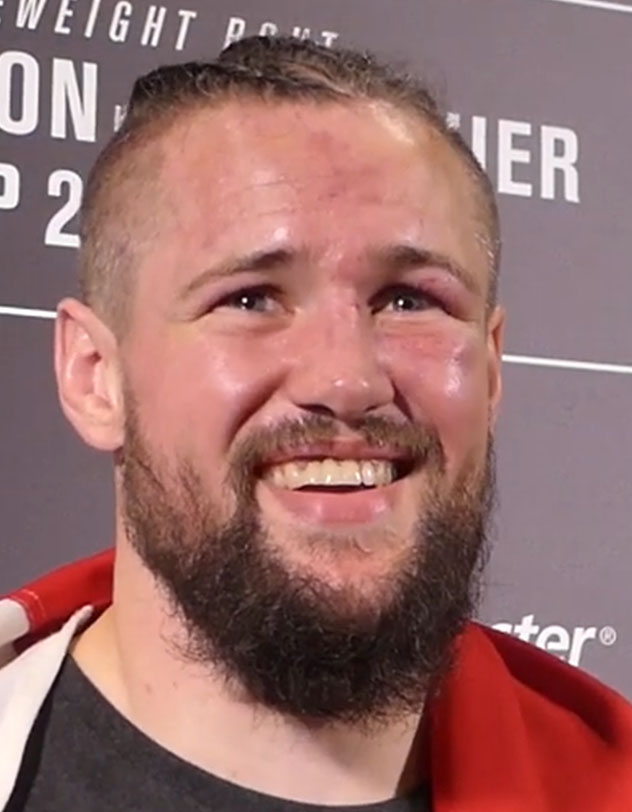
- Nicolas Dalby at UFC Fight Night 160 in Copenhagen
- Born: Nicolas Lyngh Dalby; 16 November 1984 (age 41); Sønderborg, Denmark
- Other names: Danish Dynamite, Lokomotivo
- Height: 5 ft 11 in (1.80 m)
- Weight: 170 lb (77 kg; 12 st 2 lb)
- Division: Welterweight
- Reach: 74.5 in (189 cm)
- Stance: Orthodox
- Fighting out of: Copenhagen, Denmark
- Team: Rumble sports
- Rank: Green belt in Ashihara Karate; Brown belt in Brazilian Jiu-Jitsu
- Years active: 2010–present

Kickboxing record
- Total: 1
- Wins: 1
- Losses: 0

Mixed martial arts record
- Total: 33
- Wins: 24
- By knockout: 7
- By submission: 4
- By decision: 13
- Losses: 6
- By knockout: 1
- By decision: 5
- Draws: 1
- No contests: 2

Amateur record
- Total: 5
- Wins: 4
- By knockout: 3
- Losses: 1

Other information
- Mixed martial arts record from Sherdog

Nicolas Lyngh Dalby (born 16 November 1984) is a Danish mixed martial artist who is currently fighting in the Welterweight division of the Ultimate Fighting Championship. A professional since 2010, he is both a former Welterweight and interim welterweight champion in Cage Warriors.

== Mixed martial arts career ==
=== Background and early career ===
Nicolas Dalby started learning karate as a teen to defend himself against bullies. He moved from Sønderborg to Copenhagen to be around his friends. After five years of training karate, he started training in Rumble Sports, one of the biggest MMA gyms in Copenhagen. He had a total of five amateur fights, losing the first one by decision and winning the rest of them. Dalby was quickly recognized for his powerful striking and knockout power. He became one of the most feared strikers in Europe after many brutal knockouts.

=== Cage Warriors Fighting Championship ===
In 2014, Dalby gained two victories in the Cage Warriors, including a TKO stoppage of Sergei Churilov to earn the CWFC Welterweight Championship.

=== Ultimate Fighting Championship ===
Dalby made his promotional debut against Elizeu Zaleski dos Santos on 30 May 2015 at UFC Fight Night 67. He won the fight via split decision.

Dalby next faced Darren Till on 24 October 2015 at UFC Fight Night 76. The bout ended in a majority draw. Both fighters were awarded Fight of the Night honors.

Dalby was expected to face Bartosz Fabinski on 10 April 2016 at UFC Fight Night 86. However, on 2 March, Fabiński was removed from the card due to undisclosed reasons and replaced by Zak Cummings. Dalby lost the fight via unanimous decision.

Dalby next faced Peter Sobotta on 3 September 2016 at UFC Fight Night 93. He lost the fight by unanimous decision and was subsequently released from the promotion.

=== Return to the UFC ===
Despite struggling with depression and alcoholism stemming from unsuccessful UFC stint, Dalby racked up 3–1 (1 NC) record in Cage Warriors including winning interim Welterweight Championship. Dalby was re-signed to the UFC in mid-2019 and faced Alex Oliveira on 28 September 2019 at UFC Fight Night 160. He won the fight via unanimous decision.

Dalby was scheduled to face Danny Roberts on 21 March 2020 at UFC Fight Night: Woodley vs. Edwards. Due to the COVID-19 pandemic, the event was eventually postponed . The bout with Roberts was rescheduled and was expected to take place on 26 July 2020 at UFC on ESPN 14. However, Roberts pulled out of the bout citing injury and he was replaced by Jesse Ronson. Dalby lost the fight via a rear-naked choke in round one. The fight result turned to no contest after Ronson received USADA handed 22 month suspension for testing positive for Metandienone.

Dalby was scheduled to face Orion Cosce on 21 November 2020 at UFC 255. However, Cosce was pulled from the event for undisclosed reason and he was replaced by Daniel Rodriguez. Dalby won the fight via unanimous decision.

Dalby was scheduled to face Sergey Khandozhko on 26 June 2021 at UFC Fight Night 190. However, Khandozhko pulled out due to injury and was replaced by Tim Means. Dalby lost the fight via unanimous decision.

Dalby faced Cláudio Silva on 23 July 2022, at UFC Fight Night 208. He won the fight via unanimous decision.

Dalby faced Warlley Alves on 21 January 2023, at UFC 283. He won the fight via split decision.

Dalby faced Muslim Salikhov on 24 June 2023, at UFC on ESPN 47. He won the bout via unanimous decision.

Dalby faced Gabriel Bonfim on 4 November 2023, at UFC Fight Night 231. He won the fight via technical knockout in the second round, which earned him a Fight of the Night performance bonus award.

Dalby faced Rinat Fakhretdinov on 22 June 2024, at UFC on ABC 6. He lost the close fight by split decision.

Dalby was scheduled to face Elizeu Zaleski dos Santos in a rematch on 9 November 2024, at UFC Fight Night 247. However, Dalby withdrew from the fight due to an injury and was replaced by promotional newcomer Zach Scroggin.

Dalby faced Randy Brown on 26 April 2025, at UFC on ESPN 66. He lost the fight by knockout in the second round. This fight earned him another Fight of the Night award.

Dalby faced promotional newcomer Saygid Izagakhmaev on 22 November 2025, at UFC Fight Night 265. He won the fight by split decision.

Dalby was scheduled to face Jeremiah Wells on 16 May 2026 at UFC Fight Night 276. However, on 7 May, Dalby pulled out due to an undisclosed injury.

== Championships and accomplishments ==
=== Mixed martial arts ===
- Ultimate Fighting Championship
  - Fight of the Night (Three times) vs. Darren Till, Gabriel Bonfim and Randy Brown
  - UFC.com Awards
    - 2015: Ranked #9 Fight of the Year vs. Darren Till
- Cage Warriors Fighting Championship
  - CWFC Welterweight Championship (One time)
    - One successful title defense
  - Interim CWFC Welterweight Championship (One time)
- European MMA
  - EMMA Welterweight Championship (One time)
- Fighter Gala
  - FG Welterweight Championship (One time)
  - One successful title defense
- Nordic MMA Awards - MMAviking.com
  - 2014 Knockout of the Year vs. Sergei Churilov on 22 March
  - 2015 Comeback of the Year vs. Darren Till on 24 October
  - 2019 Comeback Fighter of the Year

== Mixed martial arts record ==
Professional record breakdown
33 matches	24 wins	6 losses
By knockout	7	1
By submission	4	0
By decision	13	5
Draws	1	
No contests	2	

Res.	Record	Opponent	Method	Event	Date	Round	Time	Location	Notes
Win	24–6–1 (2)	Saygid Izagakhmaev	Decision (split)	UFC Fight Night: Tsarukyan vs. Hooker	22 November 2025	3	5:00	Al Rayyan, Qatar	
Loss	23–6–1 (2)	Randy Brown	KO (punch)	UFC on ESPN: Machado Garry vs. Prates	26 April 2025	2	1:39	Kansas City, Missouri, United States	Fight of the Night.
Loss	23–5–1 (2)	Rinat Fakhretdinov	Decision (split)	UFC on ABC: Whittaker vs. Aliskerov	22 June 2024	3	5:00	Riyadh, Saudi Arabia	
Win	23–4–1 (2)	Gabriel Bonfim	TKO (knees and punches)	UFC Fight Night: Almeida vs. Lewis	4 November 2023	2	4:33	São Paulo, Brazil	Fight of the Night.
Win	22–4–1 (2)	Muslim Salikhov	Decision (unanimous)	UFC on ESPN: Vettori vs. Cannonier	17 June 2023	3	5:00	Las Vegas, Nevada, United States	
Win	21–4–1 (2)	Warlley Alves	Decision (split)	UFC 283	21 January 2023	3	5:00	Rio de Janeiro, Brazil	
Win	20–4–1 (2)	Cláudio Silva	Decision (unanimous)	UFC Fight Night: Blaydes vs. Aspinall	23 July 2022	3	5:00	London, England	
Loss	19–4–1 (2)	Tim Means	Decision (unanimous)	UFC Fight Night: Gane vs. Volkov	26 June 2021	3	5:00	Las Vegas, Nevada, United States	
Win	19–3–1 (2)	Daniel Rodriguez	Decision (unanimous)	UFC 255	21 November 2020	3	5:00	Las Vegas, Nevada, United States	
NC	18–3–1 (2)	Jesse Ronson	NC (overturned)	UFC on ESPN: Whittaker vs. Till	26 July 2020	1	2:48	Abu Dhabi, United Arab Emirates	Originally a submission (rear-naked choke) win for Ronson; overturned after he tested positive for metandienone.
Win	18–3–1 (1)	Alex Oliveira	Decision (unanimous)	UFC Fight Night: Hermansson vs. Cannonier	28 September 2019	3	5:00	Copenhagen, Denmark	
NC	17–3–1 (1)	Ross Houston	NC (surface deemed unsafe)	Cage Warriors 106	29 June 2019	3	2:05	London, England	For the Cage Warriors Welterweight Championship.
Win	17–3–1	Alex Lohore	TKO (punches)	Cage Warriors 103	9 March 2019	4	2:47	Copenhagen, Denmark	Won the interim Cage Warriors Welterweight Championship.
Win	16–3–1	Philip Mulpeter	TKO (punches)	Cage Warriors 100	8 December 2018	3	3:32	Cardiff, Wales	
Win	15–3–1	Roberto Allegretti	Technical Submission (rear-naked choke)	Cage Warriors 96	1 September 2018	2	0:50	Liverpool, England	
Loss	14–3–1	Carlo Pedersoli Jr.	Decision (split)	Cage Warriors 93	28 April 2018	3	5:00	Gothenburg, Sweden	
Loss	14–2–1	Peter Sobotta	Decision (unanimous)	UFC Fight Night: Arlovski vs. Barnett	3 September 2016	3	5:00	Hamburg, Germany	
Loss	14–1–1	Zak Cummings	Decision (unanimous)	UFC Fight Night: Rothwell vs. dos Santos	10 April 2016	3	5:00	Zagreb, Croatia	
Draw	14–0–1	Darren Till	Draw (majority)	UFC Fight Night: Holohan vs. Smolka	24 October 2015	3	5:00	Dublin, Ireland	Fight of the Night.
Win	14–0	Elizeu Zaleski dos Santos	Decision (split)	UFC Fight Night: Condit vs. Alves	30 May 2015	3	5:00	Goiânia, Brazil	
Win	13–0	Mohsen Bahari	Decision (unanimous)	Cage Warriors 74	15 November 2014	5	5:00	London, England	Defended the Cage Warriors Welterweight Championship.
Win	12–0	Sergei Churilov	TKO (head kick and punches)	Cage Warriors 66	22 March 2014	4	2:19	Ballerup, Denmark	Won the vacant Cage Warriors Welterweight Championship.
Win	11–0	Morten Djursaa	TKO (punches)	European MMA 6	26 September 2013	1	0:27	Brøndby, Denmark	Won the EMMA Welterweight Championship.
Win	10–0	Ivica Trušček	Decision (unanimous)	WKN Valhalla: Battle of the Vikings	9 March 2013	3	5:00	Aarhus, Denmark	
Win	9–0	Ivica Trušček	Decision (unanimous)	Royal Arena 2	31 August 2012	3	5:00	Brøndby, Denmark	
Win	8–0	Cristian Brinzan	Submission (arm-triangle choke)	Fighter Gala 25	12 May 2012	2	4:45	Frederiksberg, Denmark	Defended the Fight Gala Welterweight Championship.
Win	7–0	Acoidan Duque	Decision (unanimous)	Royal Arena 1	10 March 2012	3	5:00	Brøndby, Denmark	
Win	6–0	Glenn Sparv	Decision (unanimous)	Cage Fight Live 2	19 November 2011	3	5:00	Herning, Denmark	
Win	5–0	Mindaugas Baranauskas	KO (punch)	Fighter Gala 23	1 October 2011	1	1:22	Copenhagen, Denmark	Won the Fight Gala Welterweight Championship.
Win	4–0	Raymond Jarman	Submission (rear-naked choke)	Fighter Gala 17	13 November 2010	2	1:08	Odense, Denmark	
Win	3–0	Raimondas Sinica	KO (punches)	Fighter Gala 16	2 October 2010	1	0:06	Helsingør, Denmark	
Win	2–0	Jaroslav Poborský	Decision (unanimous)	Fighter Gala 13	17 April 2010	3	5:00	Copenhagen, Denmark	
Win	1–0	Laurens-Jan Thijssen	Submission (rear-naked choke)	Fighter Gala: Fight Night 5	6 March 2010	3	2:35	Sønderborg, Denmark	
