= Uroš Medić =

Serbian mixed martial arts fighter

- Born: April 25, 1993 (age 33); Novi Sad, Serbia, FR Yugoslavia
- Native name: Урош Медић
- Other names: The Doctor
- Nationality: Serbian
- Height: 6 ft 1 in (1.85 m)
- Weight: 171 lb (78 kg; 12 st 3 lb)
- Division: Middleweight; Welterweight; Lightweight
- Reach: 71 in (180 cm)
- Fighting out of: Anchorage, Alaska, U.S.
- Team: Kings MMA
- Rank: Blue belt in Brazilian Jiu-Jitsu; Orange belt in Judo
- Years active: 2016–present

Mixed martial arts record
- Total: 18
- Wins: 14
- By knockout: 12
- By submission: 2
- Losses: 3
- By knockout: 1
- By submission: 2
- Draws: 1

Other information
- Mixed martial arts record from Sherdog

Uroš Medić (Serbian Cyrillic: Урош Медић; born April 25, 1993) is a Serbian mixed martial artist who competes in the Welterweight division of the Ultimate Fighting Championship. As of November 14, 2026, he is #10 in the Meta UFC welterweight rankings.

== Background ==
Born and raised in Novi Sad, he started Judo at four years old. His family is originally from Janj Region, Šipovo, Republika Srpska, Bosnia & Herzegovina. He also participated in kickboxing at Club Novi Sad under head coach Srdjan Nadrljanski. Medić came to North America in 2015 for college through the "Work and Travel" program and stayed in Anchorage due to his work at Anchorage BJJ, as he was working as a coach for several years.

== Mixed martial arts career ==
=== Early career ===
Making his MMA debut in 2016 at Alaska FC: Land of the Midnight Sun 3, he picked up his first victory beating Rob Rivera via TKO in round one, Medić would go on to finish his 4 bouts, submitting Seth Kroll in the first round via triangle choke AFC 136, Nathan Feitosa via TKO in round two at AFC 138, Jason Flowers in round one via triangle choke at AFC 142, and finally at AFC 148, he defeated Alonzo Leisholm Jr via TKO in the first round.

=== Dana White’s Contender Series ===
Medić faced Mikey Gonzalez at Dana White's Contender Series 27, on August 4, 2020. He won the fight via technical knockout and was subsequently awarded a UFC contract.

=== Ultimate Fighting Championship ===
Medić faced Aalon Cruz on March 6, 2021, at UFC 259. He won the fight via technical knockout in round one. This win earned him the Performance of the Night award.

Medić faced Jalin Turner on September 25, 2021, at UFC 266. He lost the fight via submission in round one.

Medić faced Omar Morales on May 21, 2022, at UFC Fight Night 206. He won the fight via technical knockout in round two.

Medić was scheduled to face Mike Davis on October 1, 2022, at UFC Fight Night 211. However, Medić was removed from the bout for undisclosed reasons.

Medić replaced Yohan Lainesse to face Matthew Semelsberger at UFC 291 on July 29, 2023. He won the bout by TKO in round three via a spinning back fist followed with punches.

Medić was scheduled to face Jonny Parsons on November 18, 2023 at UFC Fight Night 232. However, Parsons pulled out due to undisclosed reasons and was replaced by promotional newcomer Myktybek Orolbai. Medić lost the fight via submission in the second round.

Medić faced Tim Means on April 27, 2024 at UFC on ESPN 55. He won the fight by knockout with an uppercut in the first round. This fight earned him the Performance of the Night award.

Medić was scheduled to face Danny Barlow on August 10, 2024 at UFC Fight Night 242. However, on July 11, Medić announced on social media that a rib injury has forced him to withdraw from the bout.

Medić faced Punahele Soriano on January 11, 2025 at UFC Fight Night 249. He lost the fight by knockout early in the first round.

Medić was scheduled to face Khaos Williams on June 7, 2025, at UFC 316. However, Medić pulled out in late May due to sinusitis and was replaced by promotional newcomer Albert Tadevosyan.

Medić faced Gilbert Urbina on August 9, 2025, at UFC on ESPN 72. He won the fight by knockout one minute into the first round.

Medić faced Muslim Salikhov on November 8, 2025, at UFC Fight Night 264. He won the fight via technical knockout early in the first round.

Medić faced Geoff Neal on February 21, 2026 at UFC Fight Night 267. He won the fight by knockout in the first round. This fight earned him a $100,000 Performance of the Night award.

Medić faced Daniel Rodriguez on August 1, 2026 in the main event at UFC Fight Night 283. He won the fight by technical knockout thirty seconds into the first round. This fight earned him another $100,000 Performance of the Night award.

Medić faced Kevin Holland on November 14, 2026 at UFC 334. After Medić was deducted a point for repeated groin strikes, the bout ended in a majority draw.

== Championships and accomplishments ==
- Ultimate Fighting Championship
  - Performance of the Night (Four times) vs. Aalon Cruz, Tim Means, Geoff Neal and Daniel Rodriguez
  - Tied (Vicente Luque & Anthony Johnson) for most first-round knockouts in UFC Welterweight division history (5)
  - Fourth shortest average fight time in UFC Welterweight division history (4:49)
  - Third most average knockdowns-per-fifteen minutes in UFC Welterweight division history (2.07)

== Mixed martial arts record ==
Professional record breakdown
18 matches	14 wins	3 losses
By knockout	12	1
By submission	2	2
Draws	1	

Res.	Record	Opponent	Method	Event	Date	Round	Time	Location	Notes
Draw	14–3–1	Kevin Holland	Draw (majority)	UFC 334	November 14, 2026	3	5:00	New York City, New York, United States	Medić was deducted one point in round 2 due to repeated groin strikes.
Win	14–3	Daniel Rodriguez	TKO (punches)	UFC Fight Night: Medić vs. Rodriguez	August 1, 2026	1	0:30	Belgrade, Serbia	Performance of the Night.
Win	13–3	Geoff Neal	KO (punches)	UFC Fight Night: Strickland vs. Hernandez	February 21, 2026	1	1:19	Houston, Texas, United States	Performance of the Night.
Win	12–3	Muslim Salikhov	TKO (punches)	UFC Fight Night: Bonfim vs. Brown	November 8, 2025	1	1:03	Las Vegas, Nevada, United States	
Win	11–3	Gilbert Urbina	KO (punch)	UFC on ESPN: Dolidze vs. Hernandez	August 9, 2025	1	1:03	Las Vegas, Nevada, United States	
Loss	10–3	Punahele Soriano	KO (punches)	UFC Fight Night: Dern vs. Ribas 2	January 11, 2025	1	0:31	Las Vegas, Nevada, United States	
Win	10–2	Tim Means	TKO (punches)	UFC on ESPN: Nicolau vs. Perez	April 27, 2024	1	2:09	Las Vegas, Nevada, United States	Performance of the Night.
Loss	9–2	Myktybek Orolbai	Submission (neck crank)	UFC Fight Night: Allen vs. Craig	November 18, 2023	2	4:12	Las Vegas, Nevada, United States	
Win	9–1	Matthew Semelsberger	TKO (spinning backfist and punches)	UFC 291	July 29, 2023	3	2:36	Salt Lake City, Utah, United States	Return to Welterweight.
Win	8–1	Omar Morales	TKO (punches)	UFC Fight Night: Holm vs. Vieira	May 21, 2022	2	3:05	Las Vegas, Nevada, United States	
Loss	7–1	Jalin Turner	Submission (rear-naked choke)	UFC 266	September 25, 2021	1	4:01	Las Vegas, Nevada, United States	
Win	7–0	Aalon Cruz	TKO (punches)	UFC 259	March 6, 2021	1	1:40	Las Vegas, Nevada, United States	Performance of the Night.
Win	6–0	Mikey Gonzalez	TKO (punches)	Dana White's Contender Series 27	August 4, 2020	1	2:12	Las Vegas, Nevada, United States	Lightweight debut.
Win	5–0	Alonzo Leisholmn Jr.	TKO (punches)	Alaska FC 148	May 22, 2019	1	2:52	Anchorage, Alaska, United States	
Win	4–0	Jason Flowers	Submission (triangle choke)	Alaska FC 142	October 17, 2018	1	3:38	Anchorage, Alaska, United States	
Win	3–0	Nathan Feitosa	TKO (punches)	Alaska FC 138	March 28, 2018	2	0:51	Anchorage, Alaska, United States	
Win	2–0	Seth Kroll	Submission (triangle choke)	Alaska FC 136	January 17, 2018	1	1:46	Anchorage, Alaska, United States	Welterweight debut.
Win	1–0	Robert Rivera	TKO (punches)	Alaska FC: Land of the Midnight Sun 3	June 11, 2016	1	N/A	Anchorage, Alaska, United States	Middleweight debut.

== See also ==
- List of current UFC fighters
- List of Dana White's Contender Series alumni
- List of male mixed martial artists
