= Roman Kopylov =

Russian mixed martial artist (born 1991)

- Born: 4 May 1991 (age 35); Schebzavod, Belovsky District, Kemerovo Oblast, Russian SFSR, Soviet Union
- Native name: Роман Копылов
- Nationality: Russian
- Height: 6 ft 0 in (1.83 m)
- Weight: 185 lb (84 kg; 13 st 3 lb)
- Division: Light Heavyweight; Middleweight
- Reach: 75 in (191 cm)
- Stance: Southpaw
- Fighting out of: Bachatsky, Kemerovo Oblast, Russia
- Team: Ratiborets
- Years active: 2016–present

Mixed martial arts record
- Total: 21
- Wins: 16
- By knockout: 13
- By decision: 3
- Losses: 5
- By submission: 2
- By decision: 3

Other information
- Mixed martial arts record from Sherdog

Roman Yuryevich Kopylov (Russian: Роман Юрьевич Копылов; born 4 May 1991) is a Russian mixed martial artist who currently competes in the Middleweight division of the Ultimate Fighting Championship. As of October 3, 2026, he is #14 in the Meta UFC middleweight rankings.

== Background ==
Roman Kopylov was born in Shchebzavod, a small village in the Kemerovo region of Russia, and began his journey in martial arts at the age of nine. His parents, both former athletes, nurtured his passion for hand-to-hand combat. Gradually, Kopylov started winning trophies at various levels, from city to regional and higher-level competitions starting in 2010. He served in the National Guard of the Siberian District where he continued to compete in martial arts. After graduating from a branch of Kemerovo State University in 2014, he ventured into mixed martial arts.

Kopylov is a five-time world champion in hand-to-hand combat sambo, and has also won several European and Russian championships. He has earned degrees in economics and physical education from Kemerovo State University and Novokuznetsk Institute. His MMA idol is Fedor Emelianenko.

== Mixed martial arts career ==
=== Early career ===
Roman Kopylov began his MMA career in Ufa in April 2016 at the WCSA tournament. His first fight was against Filipe Aiyugono from Guinea. Despite it being his debut, Kopylov managed to win by unanimous decision after fighting all the rounds. Later in 2016, Kopylov fought in the League S-70 ring and knocked out a foreign opponent. He maintained careers in both MMA and RB and demonstrated an unmatched level of skill.

By the end of 2016, Kopylov fought Islam Gugov in the DIA, before signing a contract with Fight Nights Global. He defeated Artem Shokalo and Jacob Ortiz, then returned to League S-70 for another victory. He then fought for the Fight Nights Middleweight Championship against Abusupyan Alikhanov, who had a streak of 9 victories. Kopylov increased his pace round by round, and his opponent's corner gave up after the 4th round.

By the end of 2018, Kopylov won a title fight against Yasubey Enomoto in a joint tournament between Fight Nights and GTC. Kopylov won in the fourth round after a heavy hit to the body.

Following this victory, Kopylov's manager, Alexander Skaredin, started organizing a fight with Magomed Ismailov, but the plans were postponed indefinitely when Magomed left Fight Nights to join ASA.

=== Ultimate Fighting Championship ===
Later, Kopylov was offered a contract for 4 fights by UFC matchmakers. He was scheduled to fight Krzysztof Jotko in St. Petersburg on 20 April 2019 at UFC Fight Night 149. However, Kopylov pulled out of the bout on March 22 citing injury.

Kopylov made his UFC debut against Karl Roberson on 9 November 2019 at UFC Fight Night 163. He lost the fight via a submission in round three, his first MMA loss.

Kopylov was scheduled to replace Punahele Soriano against Eric Spicely at UFC on ESPN: Ngannou vs. Rozenstruik on 28 March 2020. However, the event was postponed due to the COVID-19 pandemic, leaving the bout was scrapped.

His next opportunity was against Tom Breese in Abu Dhabi on 4 October 2020 at UFC on ESPN 16. However, Kopylov was removed from the bout as both he and his coach tested positive for coronavirus upon arrival and had to isolate for 3 weeks.

Kopylov was then scheduled to face Sam Alvey on 31 July 2021, at UFC on ESPN 28. However, Kopylov wasn't able to obtain his US visa in time and the bout was scrapped.

Kopylov faced Albert Duraev on 30 October 2021 at UFC 267. He lost the fight via unanimous decision.

Kopylov was scheduled to face Jordan Wright at UFC Fight Night 205 on 23 April 2022. However, Kopylov withdrew from the bout and was replaced by Marc-André Barriault.

Kopylov faced Alessio Di Chirico on 3 September 2022 at UFC Fight Night 209. He won the fight via knockout in round three.

Kopylov faced Punahele Soriano on 14 January 2023 at UFC Fight Night 217. He won the fight via technical knockout after knocking down Soriano with a body kick in the second round. This win earned him the Performance of the Night bonus.

Kopylov was scheduled to face Josh Fremd on 17 June 2023 at UFC on ESPN 47. However, the bout never materialized and Kopylov took on Claudio Ribeiro at UFC 291 on 29 July 2023. Kopylov won the bout via head kick knockout in round two.

Kopylov was scheduled to face Anthony Hernandez, replacing Chris Curtis on 16 September 2023, at UFC Fight Night 227. However, Hernandez pulled out of the bout due to a torn ligament and was replaced by Josh Fremd. Kopylov won the fight via body punch knockout in round two. This win earned him the Performance of the Night award.

Kopylov faced Anthony Hernandez, replacing injured Ikram Aliskerov, on 17 February 2024, at UFC 298. In a competitive bout, Kopylov lost by a rear-naked choke submission in the second round.

Kopylov faced César Almeida on 1 June 2024 at UFC 302. He won the fight by split decision.

Kopylov was scheduled to face Brunno Ferreira on 24 August 2024 at UFC on ESPN 62. However, Kopylov withdrew from the bout after having appendicitis surgery.

Kopylov faced Chris Curtis on 11 January 2025 at UFC Fight Night 249. In a competitive bout, Kopylov won the fight by a head kick knockout with one second left in the third round. This fight earned him a Fight of the Night award.

Kopylov was scheduled to face former UFC Middleweight Championship challenger Paulo Costa on 28 June 2025 at UFC 317. However, for unknown reasons the bout was moved to UFC 318 which took place on 19 July 2025. Kopylov lost the fight by unanimous decision.

Kopylov faced Gregory Rodrigues on 15 November 2025, at UFC 322. He lost the fight by unanimous decision.

Kopylov faced Marco Tulio on 9 May 2026 at UFC 328. He won the fight by unanimous decision.

Kopylov faced Ateba Gautier on 3 October 2026 at UFC 332. He won the fight by knockout in the first round. This fight earned him a $100,000 Performance of the Night award.

== Championships and accomplishments ==
=== Mixed martial arts ===
- Ultimate Fighting Championship
  - Fight of the Night (One time) vs. Chris Curtis
  - Performance of the Night (Three times) vs. Punahele Soriano, Josh Fremd and Ateba Gautier
  - Highest takedown defense percentage in UFC Middleweight division history (88.9%)
  - Tied (Yoel Romero) for fifth most knockdowns landed in UFC Middleweight division history (10)
- Fight Nights Global
  - Fight Nights Middleweight Championship (One time)
    - One successful title defence
- World Combat Self-Defense Association
  - WCSA Middleweight Championship (One time)

== Mixed martial arts record ==
Professional record breakdown
21 matches	16 wins	5 losses
By knockout	13	0
By submission	0	2
By decision	3	3

Res.	Record	Opponent	Method	Event	Date	Round	Time	Location	Notes
Win	16–5	Ateba Gautier	KO (punches)	UFC 332	October 3, 2026	1	3:12	Salt Lake City, Utah, United States	Performance of the Night.
Win	15–5	Marco Tulio	Decision (unanimous)	UFC 328	May 9, 2026	3	5:00	Newark, New Jersey, United States	
Loss	14–5	Gregory Rodrigues	Decision (unanimous)	UFC 322	November 15, 2025	3	5:00	New York City, New York, United States	
Loss	14–4	Paulo Costa	Decision (unanimous)	UFC 318	July 19, 2025	3	5:00	New Orleans, Louisiana, United States	
Win	14–3	Chris Curtis	TKO (head kick)	UFC Fight Night: Dern vs. Ribas 2	January 11, 2025	3	4:59	Las Vegas, Nevada, United States	Fight of the Night.
Win	13–3	César Almeida	Decision (split)	UFC 302	June 1, 2024	3	5:00	Newark, New Jersey, United States	
Loss	12–3	Anthony Hernandez	Submission (rear-naked choke)	UFC 298	February 17, 2024	2	3:23	Anaheim, California, United States	
Win	12–2	Josh Fremd	KO (punch to the body)	UFC Fight Night: Grasso vs. Shevchenko 2	September 16, 2023	2	4:44	Las Vegas, Nevada, United States	Performance of the Night.
Win	11–2	Claudio Ribeiro	KO (head kick)	UFC 291	July 29, 2023	2	0:33	Salt Lake City, Utah, United States	
Win	10–2	Punahele Soriano	TKO (body kick and punches)	UFC Fight Night: Strickland vs. Imavov	January 14, 2023	2	3:19	Las Vegas, Nevada, United States	Performance of the Night.
Win	9–2	Alessio Di Chirico	KO (punches)	UFC Fight Night: Gane vs. Tuivasa	September 3, 2022	3	1:09	Paris, France	
Loss	8–2	Albert Duraev	Decision (unanimous)	UFC 267	October 30, 2021	3	5:00	Abu Dhabi, United Arab Emirates	
Loss	8–1	Karl Roberson	Submission (rear-naked choke)	UFC Fight Night: Magomedsharipov vs. Kattar	November 9, 2019	3	4:01	Moscow, Russia	Kopylov was deducted a point in round 3 due to an eye poke.
Win	8–0	Yasubey Enomoto	KO (punch to the body)	Fight Nights Global 91	December 27, 2018	4	3:39	Moscow, Russia	Defended the Fight Nights Middleweight Championship.
Win	7–0	Abusupyan Alikhanov	TKO (corner stoppage)	Fight Nights Global 85	March 30, 2018	4	5:00	Moscow, Russia	Won the Fight Nights Middleweight Championship.
Win	6–0	Luiz Gustavo Dutra	KO (punch)	League S-70: Plotforma Cup 2017	August 8, 2017	1	3:15	Sochi, Russia	
Win	5–0	Kobe Ortiz	TKO (corner stoppage)	Fight Nights Global 69	June 30, 2017	2	5:00	Novosibirsk, Russia	
Win	4–0	Artem Shokalo	TKO (punches)	Fight Nights Global 59	February 23, 2017	3	4:11	Khimki, Russia	Return to Middleweight.
Win	3–0	Islam Gugov	KO (spinning back kick to the body)	ACB 49: Rostov Onslaught	November 26, 2016	2	3:57	Rostov-on-Don, Russia	Catchweight (190 lb) bout.
Win	2–0	José Santos	KO (punch)	League S-70: Plotforma Cup 2016	August 21, 2016	3	4:52	Sochi, Russia	Light Heavyweight debut.
Win	1–0	Felipe Nsue	Decision (unanimous)	WCSA Combat Ring 18: X-Fight	April 1, 2016	3	5:00	Ufa, Russia	Middleweight debut. Won the WCSA Middleweight Championship.

== See also ==
- List of current UFC fighters
- List of male mixed martial artists
