= PFL Everett =

Professional Fighters League event in 2017

- Promotion: Professional Fighters League
- Date: July 29, 2017
- Venue: Xfinity Arena
- City: Everett, Washington, United States

Event chronology
PFL Daytona	PFL Everett	PFL Fight Night

PFL Everett was mixed martial arts event promoted by the Professional Fighters League that was held on July 29, 2017, at the Xfinity Arena in Everett, Washington.

== Background ==
The event featured the organization's featherweight title fight between Andre Harrison and Steven Rodriguez before its belts were retired and vacated on June 7, 2018, when the PFL league format began at PFL 1. Subsequently, the PFL has crowned seasonal champions as an alternative to recognizing a single lineal champion

Bruno Santos was promoted to the main card to face Rex Harris after Shamil Gamzatov withdrew from the card due to injury. Tyler Vogel replaced Santos against Taylor. A welterweight fight between Magomed Magomedkerimov and Chris Cisneros due to illness was canceled after Magomedkerimov withdrew due to illness.

== Results ==
Main Card – NBC Sports Network
Weight class				Method	Round	Time	Notes
Featherweight	Andre Harrison (c)	def.	Steven Rodriguez	Decision (unanimous) (49-46, 49-46, 49-46)	5	5:00	(Note: Defended PFL Featherweight Championship.)
Welterweight	Yushin Okami	def.	Andre Lobato	Decision (unanimous) (30-27, 30-27, 30-25)	3	5:00
Welterweight	Jake Shields	def.	Danny Davis Jr.	Decision (unanimous) (30-25, 30-24, 30-24)	3	5:00
Welterweight	Bruno Santos	def.	Rex Harris	Decision (unanimous) (30-27, 30-27, 30-27)	3	5:00
Preliminary Card
Heavyweight	Josh Copeland	def.	Mike Kyle	Decision (unanimous) (29-28, 29–28, 29-28)	3	5:00
Heavyweight	Jared Rosholt	def.	Nick Rossborough	Decision (unanimous) (30-25, 30-25, 30-25)	3	5:00
Lightweight	Luiz Firmino	def.	Eddy Ellis	TKO (punches)	1	1:45
Middleweight	Louis Taylor	def.	Zach Conn	Decision (unanimous) (30-27, 30-27, 30-27)	3	5:00
Heavyweight	Jared Torgeson	def.	Dale Sopi	Decision (split) (29-28, 29-28, 28-29)	3	5:00
Welterweight	Miles Hunsinger	def.	Andy Nigretto	Decision (unanimous) (30-27, 30-27, 30-27)	3	5:00
Middleweight	Punahele Soriano	def.	Jon Gover	TKO (punches)	1	2:36

== See also ==
- List of PFL events
- List of PFL champions
- List of current PFL fighters
