= Mateusz Rębecki =

Polish mixed martial artist (born 1992)

- Born: Mateusz Tadeusz Rębecki; October 3, 1992 (age 34); Gryfice, Poland
- Other names: Rebeasti; Chinczyk
- Height: 5 ft 7 in (1.70 m)
- Weight: 155 lb (70 kg; 11 st 1 lb)
- Division: Lightweight (2014–present)
- Reach: 66 in (168 cm)
- Fighting out of: Szczecin, Poland
- Team: Berserker's Team; American Top Team
- Years active: 2014–present

Mixed martial arts record
- Total: 26
- Wins: 21
- By knockout: 10
- By submission: 7
- By decision: 4
- Losses: 5
- By knockout: 2
- By submission: 1
- By decision: 2

Other information
- Mixed martial arts record from Sherdog

Mateusz Tadeusz Rębecki (born October 3, 1992) is a Polish professional mixed martial artist. He currently competes in the Lightweight division of the Ultimate Fighting Championship (UFC). He is a former FEN Lightweight champion.

== Mixed martial arts career ==
=== Early career ===
Rębecki made his professional debut on April 5, 2014, against Paweł Zegar. Rębecki won the fight via a first round submission.

=== Fight Exclusive Night ===
After accumulating a record of 3–1, Rębecki made his debut with Fight Exclusive Night on July 31, 2015, against Jacek Kreft. Rębecki won the fight via a first round submission. This performance earned him a Submission of the Night bonus.

After over a year out, Rębecki returned on January 14, 2017, against Adam Golonkiewicz. Rębecki won the fight via Unanimous Decision.

His next fight came on August 12, 2017, against Dmitriy Golbaev. Rębecki won the fight via a third round submission.

==== FEN Lightweight Champion ====
On March 10, 2018, Rębecki faced Marian Ziółkowski for the vacant FEN Lightweight championship. Rębecki won the fight via a fourth-round TKO. Rębecki won his first championship, and also earned himself a Knockout of the Night bonus.

His first title defense came on October 20, 2018, against Łukasz Kopera. Rębecki won the fight via a third-round TKO. This performance earned him his first Fight of the Night bonus.

His second title defense came on January 12, 2019, against Daguir Imavov. Rębecki won the fight via a first-round TKO.

His next fight was a one off fight on July 27, 2019, in the administrative region of Macau against Kaik Brito. Rębecki won the fight via a third-round TKO.

His third title defense came on January 18, 2020, against Magomed Magomedov. Rębecki won the fight via a second-round TKO.

His fourth title defense came on June 13, 2020, against Fabiano Silva. Rębecki won the fight via a first-round TKO.

His fifth title defense came on February 20, 2021, against Jose Barrios Vargas. Rębecki won the fight via a first round Knockout. This fight earned him his second Knockout of the Night bonus.

His sixth title defense came on October 16, 2021, against Felipe Maia. Rębecki won the fight via a first-round TKO.

His seventh and final title defense came on November 27, 2021, against Arkadiy Osipyan. Rębecki won the fight via Unanimous Decision.

=== Dana White's Contender Series ===
On August 30, 2022, Rębecki faced Rodrigo Lídio in the sixth season of Dana White's Contender Series. Rębecki won the fight via a first round submission, and thus earned a UFC contract.

=== Ultimate Fighting Championship ===
In his promotional debut, Rębecki was scheduled to face Omar Morales on January 14, 2023, at UFC Fight Night 217. However, Morales withdrew from the bout for undisclosed reasons and he was replaced by Nick Fiore. Rębecki won the fight via unanimous decision.

Rębecki faced Loik Radzhabov on June 24, 2023, at UFC on ABC 5. At the weigh-ins, Radzhabov weighed in at 157.25 pounds, one and quarter pounds over the lightweight non-title limit. The bout proceeded at catchweight and he was fined 20 percent of his purse, which went to Rębecki. Rębecki won the fight via a second-round TKO.

Rębecki was scheduled to face Nurullo Aliev on November 11, 2023, at UFC 295. However, Aliev withdrew from the event in early November due to injury and was replaced by returning veteran Roosevelt Roberts. At the weigh-ins, Roberts came in at 158 pounds (two pounds over the lightweight non-title bout limit). His bout with Rebecki proceeded at catchweight with Roberts forfeiting 20% of his purse. He won the bout in the first round via an armbar submission.

Rębecki was scheduled to face Joel Álvarez on April 27, 2024, at UFC on ESPN 55. However, Álvarez pulled out from the event due to undisclosed reasons and the bout was cancelled.

Rębecki faced Carlos Diego Ferreira on May 11, 2024, at UFC on ESPN 56. Rębecki lost the fight via a third-round TKO.

Rębecki faced Myktybek Orolbai on October 26, 2024, at UFC 308. Despite slated as a lightweight bout, it was changed to a 160 pounds catchweight. Rębecki won the fight via split decision. This performance earned him his first UFC Fight of the Night bonus.

Rębecki faced Chris Duncan on August 2, 2025, in the co-main event of UFC on ESPN 71. Rębecki lost the fight via unanimous decision. Despite the loss, he earned a Fight of the Night bonus.

Rębecki faced Ľudovít Klein on October 26, 2025, at UFC 321. He lost the fight by majority decision. This fight earned him another Fight of the Night award.

Rębecki faced Grant Dawson on May 9, 2026 at UFC 328. He lost the fight via a rear-naked choke in round three.

Rębecki faced Kyle Prepolec on August 1, 2026 at UFC Fight Night 283. He won the fight via technical knockout in round one.

Rębecki is scheduled to face Elves Brener on December 5, 2026 at UFC Fight Night 295.

== Championships and accomplishments ==
=== Mixed martial arts ===
- Ultimate Fighting Championship
  - Fight of the Night (Three times) vs. Myktybek Orolbai, Chris Duncan and Ľudovít Klein
- Fight Exclusive Night
  - FEN Lightweight championship (One time; former)
    - Seven successful title defenses
  - Knockout of the Night (Two times)
  - Submission of the Night (One time)
  - Fight of the Night (One time)
- MMA Mania
  - 2024 Fight of the Year vs. Myktybek Orolbai at UFC 308

== Mixed martial arts record ==
Professional record breakdown
26 matches	21 wins	5 losses
By knockout	10	2
By submission	7	1
By decision	4	2

Res.	Record	Opponent	Method	Event	Date	Round	Time	Location	Notes
Win	21–5	Kyle Prepolec	TKO (punches)	UFC Fight Night: Medić vs. Rodriguez	August 1, 2026	1	4:41	Belgrade, Serbia	
Loss	20–5	Grant Dawson	Submission (rear-naked choke)	UFC 328	May 9, 2026	3	4:42	Newark, New Jersey, United States	
Loss	20–4	Ľudovít Klein	Decision (majority)	UFC 321	October 25, 2025	3	5:00	Abu Dhabi, United Arab Emirates	Fight of the Night.
Loss	20–3	Chris Duncan	Decision (unanimous)	UFC on ESPN: Taira vs. Park	August 2, 2025	3	5:00	Las Vegas, Nevada, United States	Fight of the Night.
Win	20–2	Myktybek Orolbai	Decision (split)	UFC 308	October 26, 2024	3	5:00	Abu Dhabi, United Arab Emirates	Catchweight (160 lb) bout. Fight of the Night.
Loss	19–2	Carlos Diego Ferreira	TKO (punches)	UFC on ESPN: Lewis vs. Nascimento	May 11, 2024	3	4:51	St. Louis, Missouri, United States	
Win	19–1	Roosevelt Roberts	Submission (armbar)	UFC 295	November 11, 2023	1	3:08	New York City, New York, United States	Catchweight (158 lb) bout; Roberts missed weight.
Win	18–1	Loik Radzhabov	TKO (punch)	UFC on ABC: Emmett vs. Topuria	June 24, 2023	2	2:36	Jacksonville, Florida, United States	Catchweight (157.25 lb) bout; Radzhabov missed weight.
Win	17–1	Nick Fiore	Decision (unanimous)	UFC Fight Night: Strickland vs. Imavov	January 14, 2023	3	5:00	Las Vegas, Nevada, United States	
Win	16–1	Rodrigo Lídio	Submission (rear-naked choke)	Dana White's Contender Series 52	August 30, 2022	1	3:05	Las Vegas, Nevada, United States	
Win	15–1	Arkadiy Osipyan	Decision (unanimous)	Fight Exclusive Night 37	November 27, 2021	5	5:00	Wrocław, Poland	Defended the FEN Lightweight Championship.
Win	14–1	Felipe da Silva Maia	KO (punches)	Fight Exclusive Night 36	October 16, 2021	1	0:15	Szczecin, Poland	Defended the FEN Lightweight Championship.
Win	13–1	Jose Barrios Vargas	KO (punch)	Fight Exclusive Night 32	February 20, 2021	1	0:48	Warsaw, Poland	Defended the FEN Lightweight Championship. Knockout of the Night.
Win	12–1	Fabiano Silva	TKO (punches)	Fight Exclusive Night 28	June 13, 2020	1	4:37	Lublin, Poland	Defended the FEN Lightweight Championship.
Win	11–1	Magomed Magomedov	TKO (elbows)	Fight Exclusive Night 27	January 18, 2020	2	4:30	Szczecin, Poland	Defended the FEN Lightweight Championship.
Win	10–1	Kaik Brito	TKO (punches and elbows)	Battlefield FC 2	July 27, 2019	3	4:29	Macau SAR, China	
Win	9–1	Daguir Imavov	TKO (corner stoppage)	Fight Exclusive Night 23	January 12, 2019	1	5:00	Lubin, Poland	Defended the FEN Lightweight Championship.
Win	8–1	Łukasz Kopera	TKO (punches)	Fight Exclusive Night 22	October 20, 2018	3	0:52	Poznań, Poland	Defended the FEN Lightweight Championship. Fight of the Night.
Win	7–1	Marian Ziółkowski	KO (punch to the body)	Fight Exclusive Night 20	March 10, 2018	4	3:49	Warsaw, Poland	Won the vacant FEN Lightweight Championship. Knockout of the Night.
Win	6–1	Dmitriy Golbaev	Submission (armbar)	Fight Exclusive Night 18	August 12, 2017	3	4:59	Koszalin, Poland	
Win	5–1	Adam Golonkiewicz	Decision (unanimous)	Fight Exclusive Night 15	January 14, 2017	3	5:00	Lubin, Poland	
Win	4–1	Jacek Kreft	Submission (armbar)	Fight Exclusive Night 8	July 31, 2015	1	4:12	Kołobrzeg, Poland	Submission of the Night.
Loss	3–1	Paweł Kiełek	KO (punches)	Gryf Arena Fight Night 2	September 20, 2014	2	1:30	Gryfice, Poland	
Win	3–0	Oleg Obrevko	Submission (heel hook)	MMA Koszalin 3: Poland vs. Ukraine	August 9, 2014	1	1:45	Koszalin, Poland	
Win	2–0	Semen Tyrlya	Submission (heel hook)	Arena Berserkerów 6	June 7, 2014	1	1:55	Police, Poland	Lightweight debut. Arena Berserkers Lightweight Tournament Alternate bout.
Win	1–0	Pawel Zegar	Submission (heel hook)	Gryf Arena Fight Night 1	April 5, 2014	1	0:49	Gryfice, Poland	Catchweight (165 lb) bout.

== See also ==
- List of current UFC fighters
- List of Dana White's Contender Series alumni
- List of male mixed martial artists
