= PFL Daytona =

Professional Fighters League event in 2017

- Promotion: Professional Fighters League
- Date: June 30, 2017
- Venue: Daytona International Speedway
- City: Daytona Beach, Florida, United States

Event chronology
WSOF35: Ivanov vs. Jordan	PFL Daytona	PFL Everett

PFL Fight Night: Daytona, also known as PFL Daytona, was a mixed martial arts event promoted by the Professional Fighters League that was held on June 30, 2017 at the Daytona International Speedway in Daytona Beach, Florida and aired live on the NBC Sports Network.

It was the first event to be promoted under the PFL name following the rebranding of World Series Of Fighting by its new owners, MMAX Investment Partners.

== Background ==
The event took place in the infield at the Daytona International Speedway as a planned precursor to the Coca-Cola Firecracker 250 NASCAR XFINITY Series race, but the race was postponed until July 1 due to rain, and the fights began several hours earlier than expected.

The show drew an average of 291,000 viewers on NBC Sports Network and peaked at 495,000 for the headliner, giving the network its second-largest audience ever viewership at that time.

== Results ==
Main Card
Weight class				Method	Round	Time	Notes
Welterweight	Jon Fitch	def.	Brian Foster	Submission (rear-naked choke)	2	3:12
Welterweight	Herman Terrado	def.	Joao Zeferino	Decision (split) (29-28, 30-27, 28-29)	3	5:00
Lightweight	Jason High	def.	Caros Fodor	Decision (unanimous) (29-28, 29-28, 29-28)	3	5:00
Light heavyweight	Ronny Markes	def.	Smealinho Rama	Decision (unanimous) (29-28, 29-28, 30-27)	3	5:00

== See also ==
- List of PFL events
- List of PFL champions
- List of current PFL fighters
