= UFC 330 =

Mixed martial arts event in 2026

UFC 330: Makhachev vs. Machado Garry
- The poster for UFC 330: Makhachev vs. Machado Garry
- Promotion: Ultimate Fighting Championship
- Date: August 15, 2026
- Venue: Xfinity Mobile Arena
- City: Philadelphia, Pennsylvania, United States
- Attendance: 19,238
- Total gate: $6,715,776

Event chronology
UFC Fight Night: Gamrot vs. Salkilld	UFC 330: Makhachev vs. Machado Garry	UFC Fight Night: Hernandez vs. Rodrigues

UFC 330: Makhachev vs. Machado Garry was a mixed martial arts event produced by the Ultimate Fighting Championship that took place on August 15, 2026, at the Xfinity Mobile Arena in Philadelphia, Pennsylvania, United States. It was the twenty-sixth UFC event of the year. The card consisted of twelve bouts and was streamed on Paramount+.

The card's main event featured UFC Welterweight Champion Islam Makhachev defending his title against Ian Machado Garry. Makhachev defeated Garry by unanimous decision, surpassing Anderson Silva's record for the longest winning streak in UFC history. The co-main event featured UFC Women's Strawweight Champion Mackenzie Dern defending her title against Gillian Robertson.

== Background ==
The event marked the promotion's fourth visit to Philadelphia, its first event since UFC on ESPN: Barboza vs. Gaethje in March 2019 and first numbered event since UFC 133 in August 2011.

=== Card changes ===
A middleweight bout between Caio Borralho and Joe Pyfer was reportedly being targeted for the event. However, Borralho announced that he was unable to compete due to complications from a rib injury, and the matchup was abandoned. Erin Blanchfield and Jasmine Jasudavicius were scheduled to meet in a women's flyweight bout at the event, but Blanchfield pulled out due to injury, so the bout was rescheduled for October at UFC Fight Night: Buckley vs. Malott.

A welterweight bout between Geoff Neal and Chidi Njokuani was scheduled for the event. However, Neal had to withdraw for undisclosed reasons and was replaced by Joel Álvarez. Jose Ochoa was scheduled to face former LFA Flyweight Champion Charles Johnson in a flyweight bout. However, Ochoa pulled out for undisclosed reasons three days before the event and was replaced by promotional newcomer and fellow former LFA flyweight champion Eduardo Henrique in a 130 pound catchweight bout.

A middleweight bout between Eric McConico and undefeated prospect Donte Johnson took place at the event. The bout was originally scheduled to take place one week prior at UFC Fight Night: Gamrot vs. Salkilld, but was shifted to this event for undisclosed reasons.

== Event ==
=== Preliminary card ===
In the first fight of the event, Myktybek Orolbai faced Jeremiah Wells. The fight saw Orolbai have considerable success in the first two rounds, with Orolbai scoring takedowns on Wells and engaging in ground and pounds. However, during a striking exchange in the third round, Wells successfully put Orolbai in a ninja choke submission and put him unconscious.

=== Main card ===
==== Dern vs. Robertson ====
A UFC Women's Strawweight Championship bout between current champion Mackenzie Dern and Gillian Robertson took place at the event.

The fight saw Dern dominate Robertson for the first four rounds, until the visibly tired Dern lost the final round. Dern won the first round convincingly, controlling Robertson and nearly submitting her in the final 30 seconds as she tried to find a rear-naked choke. Dern continued to score takedowns against Robertson, winning over 10 minutes of control. Robertson saw success in the last round outstriking Dern, but was unable to capitalize enough for a finish and lost the fight by unanimous decision.

==== Makhachev vs. Garry ====
A UFC Welterweight Championship bout between current champion (also former UFC Lightweight Champion) Islam Makhachev and Ian Machado Garry headlined the event. Michael Morales served as backup and potential replacement for this fight should one of the contenders be injured. Both fighters had weighed in successfully at exactly 170lb. Makhachev claimed following the fight that he weighed 182lb in the cage.

The prelude to the fight was marked by Garry refusing to trash-talk or denigrate Makhachev's accomplishments, with Garry instead praising Makhachev as the "best fighter walking the planet right now until proven otherwise." Garry framed himself as the as best opponent Makhachev ever faced, focusing on promoting his own fight intelligence. When Makhachev was asked a question about the late Abdulmanap Nurmagomedov, Garry interrupted that Nurmagomedov would be proud, prompting ire from Makhachev. Makhachev dismissed Garry as an opponent, stating that he can outstrike him and promised to try and finish him in the early rounds. Although some similarities were raised between Conor McGregor's fight with Khabib Nurmagomedov at UFC 229, owing to both bouts being between a Dagestani champion and an Irish challenger, the lack of significant animosity between the fighters was contrasted.

The fight began with Makhachev taking down Garry in his first attempt, controlling the round with the challenger trapped against the cage. The second round saw Makhachev outstrike Garry standing up, landing a head kick that knocked Garry down and causing Garry to scramble to survive the round. The third round saw Garry see a significant amount of success with his kicks and punches, bloodying Makhachev's face with punches during clinches. The fourth round saw Makhachev continue to struggle to control Garry, pushing him against the wall and grappling him but being unable to secure significant control or land strikes on him. The fifth round saw Makhachev succeed in regaining control, taking Garry down and going to the back position to pummel Garry's face with elbows and punches. Although the fight saw Garry land 29 significant strikes to Makhachev's 22, the significant amount of control Makhachev demonstrated convinced the judges of his victory, with two judges giving all rounds except 3 to Makhachev, and the remaining judge giving rounds 3 and 4 to Garry.

== Results ==
Main card (Paramount+)
Weight class				Method	Round	Time	Notes
Welterweight	Islam Makhachev (c)	def.	Ian Machado Garry	Decision (unanimous) (49–46, 49–46, 48–47)	5	5:00	(Note: For the UFC Welterweight Championship.)
Women's Strawweight	Mackenzie Dern (c)	def.	Gillian Robertson	Decision (unanimous) (49–46, 49–46, 48–47)	5	5:00	(Note: For the UFC Women's Strawweight Championship.)
Lightweight	Jalin Turner	def.	Kauê Fernandes	KO (punches)	1	0:39
Middleweight	Dustin Stoltzfus	def.	Mansur Abdul-Malik	Submission (rear-naked choke)	2	4:25
Lightweight	Esteban Ribovics	def.	Edson Barboza	TKO (punches)	2	1:32
Preliminary card (Paramount+)
Welterweight	Chidi Njokuani	def.	Joel Álvarez	Decision (unanimous) (30–27, 30–27, 29–28)	3	5:00
Catchweight (130 lb)	Charles Johnson	def.	Eduardo Henrique	Submission (twister)	3	1:36	(Note: Henrique was deducted one point in round 1 due to an illegal knee to a grounded opponent.)
Middleweight	Donte Johnson	def.	Eric McConico Jr.	KO (punches)	1	1:38
Middleweight	Tresean Gore	def.	Vicente Luque	Decision (unanimous) (30–27, 30–27, 29–28)	3	5:00
Early preliminary card (Paramount+)
Light Heavyweight	Lucas Fernando	def.	Rafael Tobias	TKO (knee to the body and elbows)	3	1:10
Welterweight	Neil Magny	def.	Ramiz Brahimaj	TKO (punches)	2	3:20
Welterweight	Jeremiah Wells	def.	Myktybek Orolbai	Technical Submission (ninja choke)	3	1:24

== Bonus awards ==
The following fighters received $100,000 bonuses. The other finishes received $25,000 additional bonuses.

- Fight of the Night: No bonus awarded.
- Performance of the Night: Jalin Turner, Dustin Stoltzfus, Charles Johnson, and Jeremiah Wells

== Reception ==
The fight between Makhachev and Garry was deemed to be underwhelming by several pundits, who considered it to be a highly skilled, but less than entertaining affair. Jed Meshew of MMA Fighting described it as "impressive," despite not being "fun." Kevin Kinkead of Crossing Board stated that the fight was "not an instant classic," but acknowledged the talent of both fighters. Garry's repeated displays of respect earned the ire of Dana White and some observers, although he was defended by Chuck Mindenhall of Uncrowned for winning rounds off Makhachev. Joe Rogan suggested following the fight that Makhachev could return to Lightweight, noting that he struggled against heavier opponents at 170 pounds.

With his title victory, Islam Makhachev surpassed former UFC Middleweight Champion Anderson Silva's record of 16 consecutive UFC wins. The record was held by Silva for nearly 14 years, as his 16-fight streak ran from June 2006 to October 2012. Makhachev's record-setting win streak began in September 2016. Commentators were divided over if this record being broken indicated if Makhachev was one of the greatest mixed martial artists of all time. Michael Chiesa argued that Makhachev had surpassed Georges St. Pierre by defending his title at multiple weight classes. Deadspin argued that Makhachev defending his title elevated him above other double champions, though noted that other records would require Makhachev to defend his title more times to be broken. Former champions Chris Weidman, Dustin Poirier and Jorge Masvidal cast doubt on Makhachev's case, noting that he had less title defenses than other contenders.

== See also ==
- 2026 in UFC
- List of current UFC fighters
- List of UFC events
