= UFC Fight Night: Strickland vs. Imavov =

UFC mixed martial arts event in 2023

- The poster for UFC Fight Night: Strickland vs. Imavov
- Promotion: Ultimate Fighting Championship
- Date: January 14, 2023
- Venue: UFC Apex
- City: Enterprise, Nevada, United States
- Attendance: Not announced

Event chronology
UFC Fight Night: Cannonier vs. Strickland	UFC Fight Night: Strickland vs. Imavov	UFC 283: Teixeira vs. Hill

UFC Fight Night: Strickland vs. Imavov (also known as UFC Fight Night 217, UFC on ESPN+ 75 and UFC Vegas 67) was a mixed martial arts event produced by the Ultimate Fighting Championship that took place on January 14, 2023, at the UFC Apex facility in Enterprise, Nevada, part of the Las Vegas Metropolitan Area, United States.

== Background ==
A middleweight bout between former interim UFC Middleweight Championship challenger and The Ultimate Fighter: Team Jones vs. Team Sonnen middleweight winner Kelvin Gastelum and Nassourdine Imavov was scheduled to headline the event. The pair was previously scheduled to meet at UFC 273, but Imavov was forced to withdraw due to visa issues. However, the week of the event, Gastelum withdrew due to a mouth injury and was replaced by Sean Strickland, with the bout taking place at light heavyweight.

A heavyweight bout between Jailton Almeida and Shamil Abdurakhimov was originally announced for this date. However the UFC issued a correction a short time later announcing the fight was set for UFC 283 the following week.

A flyweight bout between Jeff Molina and Jimmy Flick was expected to take place at the event. However, Molina withdrew from the event due to undisclosed reasons and was replaced by Charles Johnson. A few weeks later it was announced that Molina was under suspension by the Nevada Athletic Commission as he has been linked to an investigation around the Nov. 5 fight between Darrick Minner and Shayilan Nuerdanbieke.

Welterweights Geoff Neal and Shavkat Rakhmonov were expected to meet at this event. However on December 29, Neal pulled out due to undisclosed injury and the bout was rescheduled for UFC 285.

Omar Morales was expected to face Mateusz Rębecki in a lightweight bout. However, Morales withdrew from the bout for undisclosed reasons and was replaced by Nick Fiore.

Isaac Dulgarian was expected to face Daniel Argueta in a featherweight bout. However, Dulgarian withdrew from the bout for undisclosed reasons and was replaced by promotional newcomer Nick Aguirre.

A Featherweight bout between Jarno Errens and David Onama was scheduled for this event. Errens however sustained a shoulder injury in December and the bout was scrapped.

A women's flyweight bout between Priscila Cachoeira and Sijara Eubanks was expected to take place at the event. However, the day before the event, Eubanks was forced to withdraw due to weight management issues and the bout was scrapped.

== Results ==
Main card (ESPN+)
Weight class				Method	Round	Time	Notes
Light Heavyweight	Sean Strickland	def.	Nassourdine Imavov	Decision (unanimous) (49–46, 49–46, 48–47)	5	5:00
Featherweight	Dan Ige	def.	Damon Jackson	KO (punch)	2	4:13
Middleweight	Roman Kopylov	def.	Punahele Soriano	TKO (body kick and punches)	2	3:19
Women's Bantamweight	Raquel Pennington	def.	Ketlen Vieira	Decision (split) (29–28, 28–29, 29–28)	3	5:00
Bantamweight	Umar Nurmagomedov	def.	Raoni Barcelos	KO (body kick and punch)	1	4:40
Preliminary card (ESPN+)
Bantamweight	Javid Basharat	def.	Mateus Mendonça	Decision (unanimous) (30–27, 30–27, 29–28)	3	5:00
Middleweight	Abdul Razak Alhassan	def.	Claudio Ribeiro	KO (punches)	2	0:28
Lightweight	Mateusz Rębecki	def.	Nick Fiore	Decision (unanimous) (30–26, 30–27, 30–27)	3	5:00
Flyweight	Allan Nascimento	def.	Carlos Hernández	Submission (rear-naked choke)	1	3:16
Featherweight	Daniel Argueta	def.	Nick Aguirre	Decision (unanimous) (30–27, 30–27, 30–27)	3	5:00
Flyweight	Charles Johnson	def.	Jimmy Flick	TKO (elbows and punches)	1	4:33

== Bonus awards ==
The following fighters received $50,000 bonuses.

- Fight of the Night: No bonus awarded.
- Performance of the Night: Dan Ige, Roman Kopylov, Umar Nurmagomedov, and Allan Nascimento

== See also ==
- List of UFC events
- List of current UFC fighters
- 2023 in UFC
