= UFC 266 =

2021 MMA event

UFC 266: Volkanovski vs. Ortega
- The poster for UFC 266: Volkanovski vs. Ortega
- Promotion: Ultimate Fighting Championship
- Date: September 25, 2021
- Venue: T-Mobile Arena
- City: Paradise, Nevada, United States
- Attendance: 19,029
- Total gate: $5,609,906

Event chronology
UFC Fight Night: Smith vs. Spann	UFC 266: Volkanovski vs. Ortega	UFC Fight Night: Santos vs. Walker

UFC 266: Volkanovski vs. Ortega was a mixed martial arts event produced by the Ultimate Fighting Championship that took place on September 25, 2021, at the T-Mobile Arena in Paradise, Nevada, part of the Las Vegas Metropolitan Area, United States.

== Background ==
After a one-year hiatus due to the COVID-19 pandemic, the promotion announced the return of 'International Fight Week', which took place in Las Vegas during the days leading up to and surrounding the event.

A UFC Light Heavyweight Championship bout between current champion Jan Błachowicz (also former KSW Light Heavyweight Champion) and former title challenger Glover Teixeira was scheduled take place at the event. However, the bout was postponed in late June and moved to UFC 267.

A UFC Featherweight Championship bout between current champion Alexander Volkanovski and former title challenger Brian Ortega headlined the event. The pairing was previously scheduled to take place at UFC 260, but it was cancelled a week before taking place as Volkanovski tested positive for COVID-19. The pairing was then postponed a few months as both fighters were named head coaches for The Return of The Ultimate Fighter: Team Volkanovski vs. Team Ortega.

A UFC Women's Flyweight Championship bout between current champion Valentina Shevchenko and former Invicta FC Bantamweight Champion Lauren Murphy served as the co-headliner.

A middleweight bout between former UFC Welterweight Champion Robbie Lawler and former WEC and Strikeforce Welterweight Champion Nick Diaz (also former welterweight title challenger) took place at this event, marking the second time a non-main event and non-title bout had been scheduled for five rounds. They previously met 17 years ago at UFC 47, with Diaz winning by knockout. The bout was originally expected to take place at welterweight, but was moved up a weight class days before the event.

A heavyweight bout between Shamil Abdurakhimov and Chris Daukaus took place at the event. The pairing was initially scheduled to meet on July 24, 2021, at UFC on ESPN: Sandhagen vs. Dillashaw, but the matchup was removed from that card on July 19 due to COVID-19 protocols within Abdurakhimov's camp. The matchup remained intact and was rescheduled for the following week at UFC on ESPN: Hall vs. Strickland, but it was postponed again due to undisclosed reasons.

A women's flyweight bout between The Ultimate Fighter: Team Joanna vs. Team Cláudia strawweight winner Tatiana Suarez and former title challenger Roxanne Modafferi was scheduled for the event. However, Suarez pulled out due to a knee injury that would require surgery. She was replaced by Taila Santos. The pairing was previously scheduled for UFC on ESPN: Rodriguez vs. Waterson in May, but Modafferi pulled out due to a meniscus tear a month before that event and the bout was scrapped.

A bantamweight bout between Timur Valiev and Ricky Simón was originally linked to this event. However, the bout was never officially announced by the promotion and Valiev was instead scheduled to face Daniel Santos at UFC Fight Night: Ladd vs. Dumont.

A women's flyweight bout between Manon Fiorot and Mayra Bueno Silva was expected to take place at the event. However, the bout was postponed to UFC Fight Night: Ladd vs. Dumont due to COVID-19 protocols.

A middleweight bout between Karl Roberson and Nick Maximov was scheduled for this event. However, Roberson was forced to withdraw from the event due to medical issues and was replaced by promotional newcomer Cody Brundage.

== Results ==
Main card
Weight class				Method	Round	Time	Notes
Featherweight	Alexander Volkanovski (c)	def.	Brian Ortega	Decision (unanimous) (49–46, 50–45, 50–44)	5	5:00	(Note: For the UFC Featherweight Championship.)
Women’s Flyweight	Valentina Shevchenko (c)	def.	Lauren Murphy	TKO (elbows and punches)	4	4:00	(Note: For the UFC Women's Flyweight Championship.)
Middleweight	Robbie Lawler	def.	Nick Diaz	TKO (retirement)	3	0:44
Heavyweight	Curtis Blaydes	def.	Jairzinho Rozenstruik	Decision (unanimous) (30–27, 30–27, 30–27)	3	5:00
Women’s Flyweight	Jéssica Andrade	def.	Cynthia Calvillo	TKO (punches)	1	4:54
Preliminary card (ESPNews / ESPN+)
Bantamweight	Merab Dvalishvili	def.	Marlon Moraes	TKO (punches)	2	4:25
Lightweight	Dan Hooker	def.	Nasrat Haqparast	Decision (unanimous) (30–27, 30–27, 30–26)	3	5:00
Heavyweight	Chris Daukaus	def.	Shamil Abdurakhimov	TKO (punches and elbows)	2	1:23
Women's Flyweight	Taila Santos	def.	Roxanne Modafferi	Decision (unanimous) (30–27, 30–27, 30–27)	3	5:00
Early preliminary card (ESPN+ / UFC Fight Pass)
Lightweight	Jalin Turner	def.	Uroš Medić	Submission (rear-naked choke)	1	4:01
Middleweight	Nick Maximov	def.	Cody Brundage	Decision (unanimous) (29–28, 29–28, 29–28)	3	5:00
Welterweight	Matthew Semelsberger	def.	Martin Sano Jr.	KO (punch)	1	0:15
Featherweight	Jonathan Pearce	def.	Omar Morales	Submission (rear-naked choke)	2	3:31

== Bonus awards ==
The following fighters received $50,000 bonuses.

- Fight of the Night: Alexander Volkanovski vs. Brian Ortega
- Performance of the Night: Merab Dvalishvili and Chris Daukaus

== See also ==
- List of UFC events
- List of current UFC fighters
- 2021 in UFC
