= Punahele Soriano =

American mixed martial arts fighter (born 1992)

- Born: November 22, 1992 (age 33); Wailua, Kauai County, Hawaii, U.S.
- Other names: Puna; Story Time; Freakborg
- Height: 6 ft 0 in (1.83 m)
- Weight: 170 lb (77 kg; 12 st 2 lb)
- Division: Heavyweight; Middleweight; Welterweight
- Reach: 72 in (183 cm)
- Fighting out of: O‘ahu, Hawaii
- Team: Xtreme Couture
- Rank: Brown belt in Judo
- Wrestling: NCAA Division III Wrestling
- Years active: 2017–present

Mixed martial arts record
- Total: 18
- Wins: 13
- By knockout: 7
- By submission: 2
- By decision: 4
- Losses: 5
- By knockout: 1
- By submission: 1
- By decision: 3

Other information
- Mixed martial arts record from Sherdog

Punahele Soriano (born November 22, 1992) is an American mixed martial artist who competes in the Welterweight division of the Ultimate Fighting Championship. A professional since 2017, he has also fought in the PFL and Titan FC.

== Background ==
As a senior at Kahuku High School in Laie, Hawaii, on the North Shore of Oahu, Soriano was the 171-pound state wrestling champion, after placing third in the state as a junior. In addition to being a high school state champion in wrestling, he was a high school state judo champion. He went on to wrestle Division-III at Wartburg College in Iowa, where he earned All-America honors at the 2014 NCAAs by placing seventh in the 197-pound bracket, in the process becoming the first qualifier from Hawaii.

Soriano's interest in MMA started through friend and current UFC fighter Dan Ige, who invited Soriano to help train MMA fighters in wrestling.

== Mixed martial arts career ==
=== Early career ===
Soriano compiled an amateur record of 4–0, from 2015 until 2016. After making his professional debut in Hawaii on January 28, 2017, at X-1 World Events 45, and getting a first-round submission win, Soriano made his Middleweight and mainland debut on July 29, 2017, at PFL Everett against Jon Gover. He won the bout via first-round TKO.

Soriano faced Rafael Celestino on April 6, 2019, at Titan FC 49. He won the bout via knockout in under a minute.

After picking up a TKO win in just 45 seconds at V3 Fights 69 against James Horne, Soriano faced Jhonoven Pati on October 19, 2018, at LFA 52. He won the bout via a first-round rear-naked choke.

Soriano was invited onto Dana White's Contender Series 17 on June 18, 2019, where he faced Jamie Pickett. He won the bout via unanimous decision, getting a UFC contract in the process and going past the first round for the first time in his MMA career.

=== Ultimate Fighting Championship ===
Soriano made his UFC debut against Oskar Piechota on December 14, 2019, at UFC 245. He won the fight via knockout in the first round.

Soriano faced fellow undefeated DWCS alumni Duško Todorović on January 16, 2021, at UFC on ABC 1. He won the bout, getting the TKO at the end of the first round.

Soriano was scheduled to face Anthony Hernandez on June 26, 2021, at UFC Fight Night 190. The pairing was previously scheduled to take place in May 2020 at UFC on ESPN: Overeem vs. Harris, but Soriano pulled out due to undisclosed reasons. In turn, Hernandez pulled out in late May due to a hand injury and was replaced by Brendan Allen, with the new matchup taking place a month later at UFC on ESPN 27. Soriano lost the fight via unanimous decision.

Soriano faced Nick Maximov on February 5, 2022 at UFC Fight Night 200. He lost the fight via split decision. 12 out of 16 media scores gave it to Maximov.

Soriano faced Dalcha Lungiambula on July 16, 2022 at UFC on ABC 3. He won the fight via knockout in the second round. This win earned Soriano his first Performance of the Night bonus award.

Soriano faced Roman Kopylov on January 14, 2023 at UFC Fight Night 217. He lost the fight via technical knockout in the second round.

Soriano was scheduled to face Sedriques Dumas on June 24, 2023 at UFC on ABC 5. However, on June 15 it was announced that Soriano pulled out due to undisclosed reasons and was replaced by Cody Brundage.

Soriano faced Dustin Stoltzfus on December 2, 2023, at UFC on ESPN 52. He lost the fight via rear-naked choke in round two.

Soriano faced Miguel Baeza in his welterweight division debut on June 8, 2024 at UFC on ESPN 57. After landing a record number of ground strikes, he won the fight by unanimous decision.

Soriano faced Uroš Medić on January 11, 2025 at UFC Fight Night 249. He won the fight by knockout early in the first round.

Soriano faced Nikolay Veretennikov on October 4, 2025, at UFC 320. He won the fight by unanimous decision.

Soriano faced Ramiz Brahimaj on February 21, 2026 at UFC Fight Night 267. He won the fight by unanimous decision.

Soriano faced Daniil Donchenko on September 5, 2026 at UFC Fight Night 287. He lost the fight by unanimous decision.

== Championships and accomplishments ==
- Ultimate Fighting Championship
  - Performance of the Night (One time) vs. Dalcha Lungiambula
  - Most significant ground strikes landed in a bout in UFC history (136) (vs. Miguel Baeza)
    - Most significant ground strikes landed in a UFC welterweight bout (136) (vs. Miguel Baeza)
    - Most total ground strikes landed in a UFC welterweight bout (317) (vs. Miguel Baeza)
  - Second most total strikes landed in a UFC welterweight bout (331) (vs. Miguel Baeza)
  - Highest significant strike differential in a UFC welterweight bout (+137) (vs. Miguel Baeza)
  - Highest strike differential for total strikes in a three-round UFC bout (+309) (vs. Miguel Baeza)
  - Most total strikes landed in a round in UFC history (184 in R3) (vs. Miguel Baeza)

== Mixed martial arts record ==
Professional record breakdown
18 matches	13 wins	5 losses
By knockout	7	1
By submission	2	1
By decision	4	3

Res.	Record	Opponent	Method	Event	Date	Round	Time	Location	Notes
Loss	13–5	Daniil Donchenko	Decision (unanimous)	UFC Fight Night: Hooker vs. Parnasse	September 5, 2026	3	5:00	Paris, France	
Win	13–4	Ramiz Brahimaj	Decision (unanimous)	UFC Fight Night: Strickland vs. Hernandez	February 21, 2026	3	5:00	Houston, Texas, United States	
Win	12–4	Nikolay Veretennikov	Decision (unanimous)	UFC 320	October 4, 2025	3	5:00	Las Vegas, Nevada, United States	
Win	11–4	Uroš Medić	KO (punches)	UFC Fight Night: Dern vs. Ribas 2	January 11, 2025	1	0:31	Las Vegas, Nevada, United States	
Win	10–4	Miguel Baeza	Decision (unanimous)	UFC on ESPN: Cannonier vs. Imavov	June 8, 2024	3	5:00	Louisville, Kentucky, United States	Welterweight debut.
Loss	9–4	Dustin Stoltzfus	Submission (rear-naked choke)	UFC on ESPN: Dariush vs. Tsarukyan	December 2, 2023	2	4:10	Austin, Texas, United States	
Loss	9–3	Roman Kopylov	TKO (body kick and punches)	UFC Fight Night: Strickland vs. Imavov	January 14, 2023	2	3:19	Las Vegas, Nevada, United States	
Win	9–2	Dalcha Lungiambula	KO (punches)	UFC on ABC: Ortega vs. Rodríguez	July 16, 2022	2	0:28	Elmont, New York, United States	Performance of the Night.
Loss	8–2	Nick Maximov	Decision (split)	UFC Fight Night: Hermansson vs. Strickland	February 5, 2022	3	5:00	Las Vegas, Nevada, United States	
Loss	8–1	Brendan Allen	Decision (unanimous)	UFC on ESPN: Sandhagen vs. Dillashaw	July 24, 2021	3	5:00	Las Vegas, Nevada, United States	
Win	8–0	Duško Todorović	TKO (punches)	UFC on ABC: Holloway vs. Kattar	January 16, 2021	1	4:48	Abu Dhabi, United Arab Emirates	
Win	7–0	Oskar Piechota	KO (punch)	UFC 245	December 14, 2019	1	3:17	Las Vegas, Nevada, United States	
Win	6–0	Jamie Pickett	Decision (unanimous)	Dana White's Contender Series 17	June 18, 2019	3	5:00	Las Vegas, Nevada, United States	
Win	5–0	Jhonoven Pati	Submission (rear-naked choke)	LFA 52	October 19, 2018	1	3:36	Belton, Texas, United States	
Win	4–0	James Horne	TKO (punches)	V3 Fights 69	June 16, 2018	1	0:45	Memphis, Tennessee, United States	
Win	3–0	Rafael Celestino	KO (punches)	Titan FC 49	April 6, 2018	1	0:31	Fort Lauderdale, Florida, United States	
Win	2–0	Jon Gover	TKO (punches)	PFL Everett	July 29, 2017	1	2:36	Everett, Washington, United States	Middleweight debut.
Win	1–0	Jon Ferrell	Submission (rear-naked choke)	X-1 World Events 45	January 28, 2017	1	2:20	Honolulu, Hawaii, United States	Heavyweight debut.

== See also ==
- List of current UFC fighters
- List of Dana White's Contender Series alumni
- List of male mixed martial artists
