= UFC Fight Night: Gane vs. Volkov =

Mixed martial arts event in 2021

- The poster for UFC Fight Night: Gane vs. Volkov
- Promotion: Ultimate Fighting Championship
- Date: June 26, 2021
- Venue: UFC Apex
- City: Enterprise, Nevada
- Attendance: None (behind closed doors)

Event chronology
UFC on ESPN: The Korean Zombie vs. Ige	UFC Fight Night: Gane vs. Volkov	UFC 264: Poirier vs. McGregor 3

UFC Fight Night: Gane vs. Volkov (also known as UFC Fight Night 190, UFC on ESPN+ 48 and UFC Vegas 30) was a mixed martial arts event produced by the Ultimate Fighting Championship that took place on June 26, 2021 at the UFC Apex facility in Enterprise, Nevada, part of the Las Vegas Metropolitan Area, United States.

== Background ==
A heavyweight bout between Ciryl Gane and former Bellator Heavyweight World Champion Alexander Volkov served as the event's headliner.

A middleweight bout between Anthony Hernandez and Punahele Soriano was expected to take place at the event. The pairing was previously scheduled to take place in May 2020 at UFC on ESPN: Overeem vs. Harris, but Soriano pulled out due to undisclosed reasons. In turn, Hernandez pulled out in late May due to a hand injury and was replaced by Brendan Allen, with the new matchup expected to take place a month later at UFC Fight Night: Sandhagen vs. Dillashaw.

A lightweight bout between Yancy Medeiros and Damir Hadžović has been rescheduled for the second time and took place at the event. The pairing was first scheduled to meet at UFC Fight Night: Font vs. Garbrandt. However, it was pulled from the card just hours before taking place due to health issues with Hadžović.

A women's bantamweight bout between Julija Stoliarenko and Julia Avila was also rescheduled to take place at this event. The bout was previously scheduled to take place in March at UFC on ESPN: Brunson vs. Holland, but it was cancelled as Stoliarenko was deemed medically unfit to compete due to complications from her weight cut, including collapsing twice off the scales during her attempts.

Ed Herman was expected to face Danilo Marques in a light heavyweight bout at the event. However, Herman was removed from the card due to undisclosed reasons on June 14 and replaced by Kennedy Nzechukwu.

A welterweight bout between Nicolas Dalby and Sergey Khandozhko was expected to take place at the event. However on June 15, Khandozhko pulled out due to injury and was replaced by Tim Means.

Ramazan Emeev was expected to face The Ultimate Fighter: Brazil 3 middleweight winner Warlley Alves in a welterweight bout. However, Emeev pulled out in mid June due to undisclosed reasons and was replaced by promotional newcomer Jeremiah Wells.

A light heavyweight bout between former interim UFC Light Heavyweight Championship challenger Ovince Saint Preux and Maxim Grishin was expected to take place at the event. However, Grishin withdrew from the bout due to visa issues and was replaced by Tanner Boser in a heavyweight bout.

A flyweight bout between former UFC Flyweight Championship challenger Tim Elliott (also The Ultimate Fighter: Tournament of Champions flyweight winner) and Su Mudaerji was scheduled for this event. However, Mudaerji pulled out due to a knee injury that will require surgery and the bout was scrapped.

== Results ==
Main Card (ESPN+)
Weight class				Method	Round	Time	Notes
Heavyweight	Ciryl Gane	def.	Alexander Volkov	Decision (unanimous) (50–45, 50–45, 49–46)	5	5:00
Heavyweight	Tanner Boser	def.	Ovince Saint Preux	KO (punches)	2	2:31
Bantamweight	Timur Valiev	def.	Raoni Barcelos	Decision (majority) (28–28, 29–28, 29–28)	3	5:00
Featherweight	Andre Fili	vs.	Daniel Pineda	No Contest (accidental eye poke)	2	0:46	(Note: Accidental eye poke rendered Pineda unable to continue.)
Welterweight	Tim Means	def.	Nicolas Dalby	Decision (unanimous) (29–28, 29–28, 29–28)	3	5:00
Lightweight	Renato Moicano	def.	Jai Herbert	Submission (rear-naked choke)	2	4:34
Preliminary card (ESPN+)
Light Heavyweight	Kennedy Nzechukwu	def.	Danilo Marques	TKO (punches)	3	0:20
Welterweight	Shavkat Rakhmonov	def.	Michel Prazeres	Submission (rear-naked choke)	2	2:10
Welterweight	Jeremiah Wells	def.	Warlley Alves	KO (punches)	2	0:30
Light Heavyweight	Marcin Prachnio	def.	Ike Villanueva	TKO (body kick)	2	0:56
Women's Bantamweight	Julia Avila	def.	Julija Stoliarenko	Submission (rear-naked choke)	3	4:19
Featherweight	Charles Rosa	def.	Justin Jaynes	Decision (split) (30–27, 28–29, 29–28)	3	5:00
Lightweight	Damir Hadžović	def.	Yancy Medeiros	Decision (unanimous) (29–28, 29–28, 29–28)	3	5:00

== Bonus awards ==
The following fighters received $50,000 bonuses.

- Fight of the Night: Timur Valiev vs. Raoni Barcelos
- Performance of the Night: Kennedy Nzechukwu and Marcin Prachnio

== See also ==
- List of UFC events
- List of current UFC fighters
- 2021 in UFC
