= List of Dana White's Contender Series alumni =

List of talent-scouting program alumni

Dana White's Contender Series is a talent‑scouting program produced by the Ultimate Fighting Championship (UFC), featuring fighters competing for the opportunity to earn promotional contracts. Since its debut in 2017, the series has served as a major feeder system for the UFC, producing numerous ranked contenders, title challengers, champions, and long‑tenured roster members.

This list of Dana White's Contender Series alumni includes fighters who are considered notable for achieving significant milestones in their professional mixed martial arts careers after appearing on Dana White's Contender Series. Such milestones may include winning or challenging for UFC championships, appearing in the UFC's official divisional rankings, earning multiple performance bonuses (at least three), headlining UFC events, holding divisional or promotional records, or securing notable wins over high‑profile opponents.

Notable wins are generally understood as victories over opponents who have achieved significant recognition in major mixed martial arts promotions. This may include former champions, former title challengers, fighters who have appeared in the UFC's official top‑15 rankings, or opponents with widely acknowledged accomplishments such as long UFC tenure, divisional records, or multiple performance bonuses.

**Bold** - Active UFC fighters

Updated as of October 13, 2026 after DWCS S10E10.

S	ISO	Fighter	Div.	Ep.	Date	Outcome	Notes
1	(United States)	Kurt Holobaugh	LW	S01E01	2017-07-11	Signed via DWCS	Former TUF 31 Winner. UFC record: 2–6.
1	(United States)	**Sean O'Malley**	BW	S01E02	2017-07-18	Signed via DWCS	Former UFC Bantamweight Champion.
1	(United States)	Thanh Le	FW	S01E02	2017-07-18	Never signed with UFC	Former ONE Featherweight Champion. Former Interim LFA Featherweight Champion.
1	(United States)	Casey Kenney	BW	S01E02	2017-07-18	Later signed with UFC	Two DWCS attempts. Has appeared in UFC rankings. Former Interim LFA Flyweight & Bantamweight Champion.
1	(United States)	Jason Jackson	WW	S01E03	2017-07-25	Never signed with UFC	Former Bellator Welterweight Champion. Former LFA Welterweight Champion.
1	(United States)	**Geoff Neal**	WW	S01E03	2017-07-25	Signed via DWCS	Has appeared in UFC rankings. Multiple post-fight bonuses.
1	(United States)	**Dan Ige**	FW	S01E03	2017-07-25	Later signed with UFC	Short-notice UFC debut. Has appeared in UFC rankings. Multiple post-fight bonuses. 20+ UFC fights.
1	(United States)	Julian Marquez	MW	S01E04	2017-08-01	Signed via DWCS	Multiple post-fight bonuses. UFC record: 3–5.
1	(United States)	**Kyler Phillips**	BW	S01E04	2017-08-01	Later signed with UFC	Has appeared in UFC rankings. Multiple post-fight bonuses.
1	(United States)	**Alex Perez**	FLW	S01E05	2017-08-08	Signed via DWCS	Former UFC Flyweight Championship challenger.
1	(United States)	**Ricky Simón**	BW	S01E05	2017-08-08	Later signed with UFC	Multiple post-fight bonuses. 10+ UFC wins. Former LFA Bantamweight Champion.
1	(United States)	**Grant Dawson**	LW	S01E06	2017-08-15	Signed via DWCS	Has appeared in UFC rankings. 10+ UFC wins.
2	(United States)	**Alonzo Menifield**	LHW	S02E01	2018-06-12	Signed via DWCS	Has appeared in UFC rankings. 10+ UFC wins.
2	(United States)	**Chris Curtis**	WW	S02E01	2018-06-12	Later signed with UFC	Multiple post-fight bonuses. Headlined a UFC event.
2	(United States)	Greg Hardy	HW	S02E01	2018-06-12	Later signed with UFC	Former NFL player. UFC record: 3–5 (1 NC).
2	(United States)	**Montel Jackson**	BW	S02E01	2018-06-12	Later signed with UFC	Has appeared in UFC rankings. Multiple post-fight bonuses. Tied for most knockdowns in UFC Bantamweight history.
2	(United States)	**Kevin Holland**	MW	S02E01	2018-06-12	Later signed with UFC	Has appeared in UFC rankings. Multiple post-fight bonuses. Tied for most UFC wins in a year (5). 25+ UFC fights. Fastest to win 5 UFC fights in a calendar year (210 days).
2	(United States)	**Anthony Hernandez**	LHW	S02E02	2018-06-19	Signed via DWCS	Has appeared in UFC rankings. Multiple post-fight bonuses. Headlined UFC Fight Nights. Former LFA Middleweight Champion. Most takedowns in UFC Middleweight history.
2	(United States)	**Ryan Spann**	LHW	S02E02	2018-06-19	Signed via DWCS	Signed via DWCS (second attempt; first appearance S01E03). Has appeared in UFC rankings. Multiple post-fight bonuses. Former LFA Light Heavyweight Champion.
2	(Georgia (country))	Giga Chikadze	FW	S02E02	2018-06-19	Later signed with UFC	Has appeared in UFC rankings. Headlined events. Multiple post-fight bonuses. UFC record: 8–5.
2	(Argentina)	Emiliano Sordi	LHW	S02E02	2018-06-19	Never signed with UFC	2019 PFL Light Heavyweight Champion.
2	(United States)	Julian Erosa	FW	S02E03	2018-06-26	Later signed with UFC	TUF 22 semifinalist. Multiple post-fight bonuses. UFC record: 10–9.
2	(United States)	**Jamall Emmers**	FW	S02E03	2018-06-26	Later signed with UFC	Has appeared in UFC rankings.
2	(United States)	**Jalin Turner**	LW	S02E04	2018-07-10	Later signed with UFC	Has appeared in UFC rankings. Multiple post-fight bonuses.
2	(United States)	**Maycee Barber**	W-SW	S02E05	2018-07-17	Signed via DWCS	Has appeared in UFC rankings. 10+ UFC wins.
2	(United States)	**Edmen Shahbazyan**	MW	S02E05	2018-07-17	Signed via DWCS	Has appeared in UFC rankings. Multiple post-fight bonuses. Headlined a UFC Fight Night event.
2	(Australia)	**Jimmy Crute**	LHW	S02E06	2018-07-24	Signed via DWCS	Has appeared in UFC rankings. Notable wins.
2	(Nigeria)	**Sodiq Yusuff**	FW	S02E06	2018-07-24	Signed via DWCS	Has appeared in UFC rankings.
2	(United States)	**Chase Hooper**	FW	S02E06	2018-07-24	Later signed with UFC	15+ UFC fights. Notable wins.
2	(United States)	Ian Heinisch	FW	S02E07	2018-07-31	Signed via DWCS	Has appeared in UFC rankings. UFC record: 3–4. Former interim LFA Middleweight Champion.
2	(Nigeria)	**Kennedy Nzechukwu**	LHW	S02E08	2018-06-19	Signed via DWCS	Signed via DWCS (second attempt; first appearance S01E07). Multiple post-fight bonuses. 10+ UFC fights.
Brazil	(Brazil)	Mayra Bueno Silva	W-BW	S02E09	2018-08-10	Signed via DWCS	Former title challenger. Multiple post-fight bonuses. UFC record: 5–7–1 (1).
Brazil	(Brazil)	Augusto Sakai	HW	S02E09	2018-08-10	Signed via DWCS	Has appeared in UFC rankings. Headlined events. UFC record: 5–5.
Brazil	(Brazil)	Taila Santos	W-FLW	S02E10	2018-08-11	Signed via DWCS	Former title challenger. UFC record: 4–3.
Brazil	(Brazil)	**Johnny Walker**	LHW	S02E10	2018-08-11	Signed via DWCS	Has appeared in UFC rankings. Multiple post-fight bonuses. Headlined events. 15+ fights.
Brazil	(Brazil)	Marina Rodriguez	W-SW	S02E10	2018-08-11	Signed via DWCS	Has appeared in UFC rankings. Multiple post-fight bonuses. Headlined events. 15 UFC fights. UFC record: 7–6–2.
Brazil	(Brazil)	Thiago Moisés	LW	S02E11	2018-08-11	Signed via DWCS	Has appeared in UFC rankings. 15+ UFC fights. UFC record: 8–8.
3	(United States)	**Punahele Soriano**	MW	S03E01	2019-06-18	Signed via DWCS	10+ UFC fights. Most total strikes in a round in UFC history (184).
3	(England)	Brendan Loughnane	FW	S03E01	2019-06-18	Never signed with UFC	2022 PFL Featherweight Champion.
3	(United States)	Bill Algeo	FW	S03E01	2019-06-18	Later signed with UFC	Multiple post-fight bonuses. UFC record: 5–5.
3	(United States)	**Kyle Daukaus**	MW	S03E02	2019-06-25	Later signed with UFC	Fastest D'Arche choke in UFC history. 10+ UFC fights.
3	(United States)	Miles Johns	BW	S03E02	2019-06-25	Signed via DWCS	Former LFA Bantamweight Champion. UFC record: 7–5 (1).
3	(United States)	Miguel Baeza	WW	S03E02	2019-06-25	Signed via DWCS	Multiple post-fight bonuses. UFC record: 3–4.
3	(United States)	**Brendan Allen**	MW	S03E04	2019-07-19	Signed via DWCS	Has appeared in UFC rankings. Headlined UFC events. Notable wins. Multiple post-fight bonuses. Former LFA Middleweight Champion.
3	(Russia)	Ramazan Kuramagomedov	MW	S03E04	2019-07-19	Never signed with UFC	Former Bellator Welterweight Champion. Former PFL Welterweight Champion.
3	(United States)	**Sean Woodson**	MW	S03E04	2019-07-19	Signed via DWCS	Notable wins. 10+ fights.
3	(United States)	**Terrance McKinney**	LW	S03E04	2019-07-19	Signed via DWCS	Fastest KO and finish in UFC lightweight history (0:07). Fastest knockout in a UFC debut (0:07).
3	(United States)	**Jamahal Hill**	LHW	S03E04	2019-07-19	Signed via DWCS	First DWCS alumnus to be a UFC champion. Former UFC Light Heavyweight Champion.
3	(United States)	**Billy Quarantillo**	LW	S03E04	2019-07-19	Signed via DWCS	Multiple post-fight bonuses.
3	(United States)	**Tracy Cortez**	W-FLW	S03E06	2019-07-30	Signed via DWCS	Has appeared in UFC rankings.
3	(United States)	**Daniel Rodriguez**	W-FLW	S03E06	2019-07-30	Later signed with UFC	Has appeared in UFC rankings. Headlined a UFC event.
3	(Brazil)	André Muniz	MW	S03E07	2019-08-06	Signed via DWCS	Signed via DWCS (second attempt; first appearance S02E10). Has appeared in UFC rankings. Notable wins. UFC record: 6–4.
3	(United States)	**Steve Garcia**	BW	S03E09	2019-08-20	Later signed with UFC	Has appeared in UFC rankings. Multiple post-fight bonuses. Headlined events.
4	(United States)	**Dustin Jacoby**	LHW	S04E01	2020-08-04	Signed via DWCS	Has appeared in UFC rankings. Multiple post-fight bonuses.
4	(Serbia)	**Uroš Medić**	LHW	S04E01	2020-08-04	Signed via DWCS	Has appeared in UFC rankings. Multiple post-fight bonuses. Headlined a UFC Fight Night event.
4	(United States)	**Jordan Leavitt**	LW	S04E01	2020-08-04	Signed via DWCS	Multiple post-fight bonuses.
4	(United States)	**Dustin Stoltzfus**	MW	S04E02	2020-08-11	Signed via DWCS	Multiple post-fight bonuses.
4	(United States)	**Adrian Yañez**	BW	S04E02	2020-08-11	Signed via DWCS	Has appeared in UFC rankings. Multiple post-fight bonuses.
4	(United States)	Impa Kasanganay	MW	S04E02	2020-08-11	Signed via DWCS	Signed via DWCS (second attempt; first appearance S03E10). 2023 PFL Light Heavyweight Champion. UFC record: 2–2.
4	(Brazil)	**Gregory Rodrigues**	MW	S04E07	2020-09-15	Signed via DWCS	Has appeared in UFC rankings. Multiple post-fight bonuses. Headlined UFC Fight Night events. 10+ UFC wins. Former LFA Middleweight Champion.
4	(New Zealand)	**Carlos Ulberg**	LHW	S04E08	2020-11-04	Signed via DWCS	UFC Light Heavyweight Champion.
4	(Chile)	**Ignacio Bahamondes**	LW	S04E08	2020-11-04	Signed via DWCS	Multiple post-fight bonuses. 10+ UFC fights.
4	(United States)	Danny Sabatello	BW	S04E09	2020-11-10	Never signed with UFC	Rizin Bantamweight Champion.
5	(Russia)	**Azamat Murzakanov**	LHW	S05E01	2021-08-31	Signed via DWCS	Has appeared in UFC rankings. Notable wins.
5	(Brazil)	**Joanderson Brito**	LHW	S05E01	2021-08-31	Signed via DWCS	Has appeared in UFC rankings.
5	(Brazil)	**Diego Lopes**	LHW	S05E01	2021-08-31	Later signed with UFC	Former title challenger. Multiple post-fight bonuses.
5	(United States)	**Chidi Njokuani**	MW	S05E02	2021-09-07	Signed via DWCS	Multiple post-fight bonuses.
5	(Brazil)	Jailton Almeida	LHW	S05E03	2021-09-14	Signed via DWCS	Has appeared in UFC rankings. Multiple post-fight bonuses. Headlined two UFC events. UFC record: 8–3.
5	(Australia)	**Jack Della Maddalena**	WW	S05E03	2021-09-14	Signed via DWCS	Former UFC Welterweight Champion.
5	(Canada)	**Jasmine Jasudavicius**	W-FLW	S05E03	2021-09-14	Signed via DWCS	Has appeared in UFC rankings. Multiple post-fight bonuses.
5	(Ecuador)	**Michael Morales**	WW	S05E04	2021-09-21	Signed via DWCS	Has appeared in UFC rankings. Multiple post-fight bonuses.
5	(Mexico)	**Daniel Zellhuber**	LW	S05E05	2021-09-28	Signed via DWCS	Multiple post-fight bonuses.
5	(Russia)	**Rizvan Kuniev**	HW	S05E05	2021-09-28	Signed via DWCS	Has appeared in UFC rankings.
5	(Canada)	**Mike Malott**	WW	S05E06	2021-10-05	Signed via DWCS	Has appeared in UFC rankings. Multiple post-fight bonuses. Headlined a UFC Fight Night event.
5	(Brazil)	**Valesca Machado**	W-SW	S05E08	2021-10-19	Later signed with UFC	TUF 34 Women's Strawweight winner in Sept 2026. Former Invicta FC Strawweight Champion.
5	(Brazil)	**Caio Borralho**	MW	S05E08	2021-10-19	Signed via DWCS	Signed via DWCS (second attempt; first appearance S05E04). Has appeared in UFC rankings. Multiple post-fight bonuses.
5	(Brazil)	**Karine Silva**	W-FLW	S05E09	2021-10-26	Signed via DWCS	Has appeared in UFC rankings.
5	(Mexico)	**Manuel Torres**	LW	S05E09	2021-10-26	Signed via DWCS	Has appeared in UFC rankings. Multiple post-fight bonuses.
6	(United States)	**Joe Pyfer**	MW	S06E01	2022-07-26	Signed via DWCS	Signed via DWCS (second attempt; first appearance S04E02). Has appeared in UFC rankings. Multiple post-fight bonuses. Headlined events.
6	(Scotland)	**Chris Duncan**	MW	S06E02	2022-08-02	Signed via DWCS	Signed via DWCS (second attempt; first appearance S05E07). Headlined a UFC event.
6	(Dominican Republic)	**Waldo Cortes-Acosta**	HW	S06E02	2022-08-02	Signed via DWCS	Has appeared in UFC rankings. Headlined an event. Multiple post-fight bonuses.
6	(United States)	**Bo Nickal**	MW	S06E10	2022-09-27	Signed via DWCS	Signed via DWCS (second attempt; first appearance S06E03). Has appeared in UFC rankings. 3x NCAA Division I Champion.
6	(Argentina)	**Esteban Ribovics**	LW	S06E04	2022-08-16	Signed via DWCS	Multiple post-fight bonuses.
6	(Azerbaijan)	**Nazim Sadykhov**	LW	S06E04	2022-08-16	Signed via DWCS	Multiple post-fight bonuses.
6	(England)	**Mick Parkin**	LW	S06E05	2022-08-23	Signed via DWCS	Has appeared in UFC rankings.
6	(Brazil)	**Denise Gomes**	W-SW	S06E05	2022-08-23	Signed via DWCS	Has appeared in UFC rankings. Tied for most knockouts in UFC women's strawweight history.
6	(Poland)	**Mateusz Rębecki**	LW	S06E06	2022-08-30	Signed via DWCS	Multiple post-fight bonuses.
6	(Brazil)	**Vitor Petrino**	LHW	S06E07	2022-09-06	Signed via DWCS	Has appeared in UFC rankings. Multiple post-fight bonuses.
6	(Brazil)	**Gabriel Bonfim**	WW	S06E07	2022-09-06	Signed via DWCS	Has appeared in UFC rankings. Multiple post-fight bonuses. Headlined events. Former LFA Welterweight Champion.
6	(Islamic Republic of Afghanistan)	Farid Basharat	BW	S06E08	2022-09-13	Signed via DWCS	Has appeared in UFC rankings. UFC record: 7–0.
6	(Russia)	**Ikram Aliskerov**	MW	S06E08	2022-09-13	Signed via DWCS	Has appeared in UFC rankings. Headlined an event.
6	(Mexico)	**Raul Rosas Jr.**	BW	S06E09	2022-09-20	Signed via DWCS	Has appeared in UFC rankings. Multiple post-fight bonuses. Youngest fighter to win 1 & 5 UFC fights, and to headline an event.
7	(Australia)	**Tom Nolan**	LW	S07E01	2023-08-08	Signed via DWCS	Has appeared in UFC rankings. Headlined an event.
7	(United States)	**Payton Talbott**	BW	S07E01	2023-08-08	Signed via DWCS	Has appeared in UFC rankings. Notable wins.
7	(Brazil)	**Carlos Prates**	WW	S07E04	2023-08-29	Signed via DWCS	Has been ranked #1. Multiple post-fight bonuses. Headlined events. Notable wins. 2024 Newcomer of the Year. 2024 UFC Honors Debut of the Year Winner.
7	(Brazil)	**Jean Silva**	FW	S07E05	2023-09-05	Signed via DWCS	Has appeared in UFC rankings. Multiple post-fight bonuses. Headlined events.
7	(Bahrain)	**Shamil Gaziev**	HW	S07E07	2023-09-19	Signed via DWCS	Has appeared in UFC rankings.
7	(Brazil)	**Talita Alencar**	W-SW	S07E07	2023-09-19	Signed via DWCS	Has appeared in UFC rankings.
7	(Brazil)	**Vinicius Oliveira**	BW	S07E08	2023-09-26	Signed via DWCS	Has appeared in UFC rankings. Headlined an event.
7	(Brazil)	**Maurício Ruffy**	LW	S07E09	2023-10-03	Signed via DWCS	Has appeared in UFC rankings. Multiple post-fight bonuses.
8	(England)	**Lone'er Kavanagh**	FLW	S08E01	2024-08-13	Signed via DWCS	Has appeared in UFC rankings. Headlined an event.
8	(Russia)	**Rizvan Kuniev**	HW	S08E02	2024-08-20	Signed via DWCS	Has appeared in UFC rankings.
8	(Australia)	**Quillan Salkilld**	LW	S08E04	2024-09-03	Signed via DWCS	Has appeared in UFC rankings. Headlined events. Multiple post-fight bonuses.
8	(New Zealand)	**Navajo Stirling**	LHW	S08E05	2024-09-10	Signed via DWCS	Has appeared in UFC rankings. Headlined an event. Notable wins.
8	(Brazil)	**Tallison Teixeira**	HW	S08E06	2024-09-17	Signed via DWCS	Has appeared in UFC rankings.
8	(Argentina)	**Kevin Vallejos**	FW	S08E07	2024-09-24	Signed via DWCS	Signed via DWCS (second attempt; first appearance S07E05). Has appeared in UFC rankings. Headlined an event.
8	(Mexico)	**Jacobe Smith**	WW	S08E08	2024-10-01	Signed via DWCS	Has appeared in UFC rankings.
8	(Mexico)	**David Martínez**	BW	S08E08	2024-10-01	Signed via DWCS	Has appeared in UFC rankings.
8	(Portugal)	**Mário Pinto**	HW	S08E09	2024-10-08	Signed via DWCS	Has appeared in UFC rankings.
9	(United States)	**Josh Hokit**	HW	S09E02	2025-08-19	Signed via DWCS	Has appeared in UFC rankings. Multiple post-fight bonuses. Notable wins. UFC Heavyweight Championship challenger.
9	(Turkey)	**Abdul-Rakhman Yakhyaev**	LHW	S09E03	2025-08-25	Signed via DWCS	Has appeared in UFC rankings. Fastest submission in UFC Light Heavyweight history.
9	(United States)	**Tommy McMillen**	FW	S09E04	2025-09-02	Signed via DWCS	Holds many three-round UFC FW striking records. Multiple post-fight bonuses.
9	(Poland)	**Iwo Baraniewski**	LHW	S09E06	2025-09-16	Signed via DWCS	Multiple post-fight bonuses.
9	(Mexico)	**Imanol Rodríguez**	FLW	S09E07	2025-10-07	Signed via DWCS	Has appeared in UFC rankings.
10	(United States)	**Anthony Wint**	HW	S10E01	2026-08-11	Signed via DWCS	Has appeared in UFC rankings.

== Other DWCS alumni ==
This section lists additional Contender Series alumni who have standalone Wikipedia articles but do not meet the notability criteria used above. This is sorted in chronological order of appearance.

**Bold** - Active UFC fighters

- Sidney Outlaw
- Daniel Spohn
- Karl Roberson
- Phil Hawes
- Brandon Davis
- Austin Arnett
- **John Castañeda**
- Mike Rodríguez
- Julio Arce
- Charles Byrd
- Martin Day
- Benito Lopez
- Steven Peterson
- JP Buys
- Mike Santiago
- Jordan Espinosa
- **Matt Frevola**
- Bevon Lewis
- Lauren Mueller
- Allen Crowder
- Don'Tale Mayes
- Austen Lane
- Jordan Wright
- Dwight Grant
- Antonina Shevchenko
- Josh Parisian
- Jordan Williams
- Kevin Aguilar
- Domingo Pilarte
- Vince Morales
- **Austin Vanderford**
- Nick Newell
- **Mike Davis**
- Jeff Hughes
- Josh Appelt
- Roosevelt Roberts
- Jordan Griffin
- Juan Adams
- Devonte Smith
- Bobby Moffett
- Rogério Bontorin
- Antônio Arroyo
- Henrique da Silva
- Raulian Paiva
- Allan Nascimento (†)
- Vinicius Moreira
- John Allan
- Luana Carolina
- Dayana Silva
- Jamie Pickett
- Hannah Goldy
- Yorgan De Castro
- Joe Solecki
- Hunter Azure
- Maki Pitolo
- Jonathan Pearce
- **Ode' Osbourne**
- Don'Tale Mayes
- Jordan Williams
- Aleksa Camur
- Mariya Agapova
- Omar Morales
- Herbert Burns
- Darrick Minner
- William Knight
- Brok Weaver
- Shanna Young
- Tony Gravely
- Julius Anglickas
- Philip Rowe
- Mallory Martin
- Micol Di Segni
- **Duško Todorović**
- T.J. Brown
- Jerome Rivera
- Cory McKenna
- **Vanessa Demopoulos**
- Cheyanne Vlismas
- Rafael Alves
- Jeff Molina
- **Melsik Baghdasaryan**
- **Cody Brundage**
- Tafon Nchukwi
- Phil Hawes
- Muhammad Naimov
- Danyelle Wolf
- Taneisha Tennant
- Luis Saldaña
- Jared Vanderaa
- Mariusz Książkiewicz
- Natan Levy
- Luana Pinheiro
- Stephanie Frausto
- Nikolas Motta
- Nick Maximov
- Gloria de Paula
- Pauline Macias
- Victoria Leonardo
- Chelsea Hackett
- C. J. Vergara
- Martin Buday
- Armen Petrosyan
- **Cristian Quiñónez**
- Javid Basharat
- Anvar Boynazarov
- **Édgar Cháirez**
- **Cameron Saaiman**
- **Rayanne dos Santos**
- Daniel Marcos
- **Nurullo Aliev**
- **Brunno Ferreira**
- **César Almeida**
- **İbo Aslan**
- **Hyder Amil**
- **Zachary Reese**
- Josefine Lindgren Knutsson
- **Yousri Belgaroui**
- Dylan Salvador
- **Jhonata Diniz**
- Igor Severino
- **André Lima**
- Nick Piccininni
- **Ateba Gautier**
- Artem Vakhitov
- **Islam Dulatov**
- **Damian Pinas**
- **Bilal Hasan**
- **Magomed Zaynukov**
- Kwon Won-il
- **Akbar Abdullaev**
- Norbert Növényi Jr.
- **Damian Piwowarczyk**
- Ilias Bulaid
- Aline Pereira
- **Smilla Sundell**

== See also ==
- Dana White's Contender Series
- List of current UFC fighters
- List of UFC champions
- List of male mixed martial artists
- List of female mixed martial artists
