= Dana White's Contender Series =

MMA competition

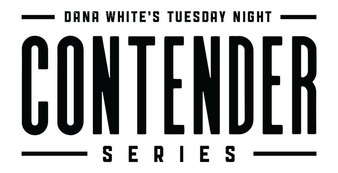
- Formerly: Dana White's Tuesday Night Contender Series
- Type: Subsidiary
- Industry: Mixed martial arts
- Founded: July 2017; 9 years ago
- Founders: Dana White
- Headquarters: Las Vegas, Nevada, United States
- Owner: DWTNCS, LLC
- Parent: TKO Group Holdings
- Website: UFC.com/DWCS

Dana White's Contender Series, formerly named Dana White's Tuesday Night Contender Series, is an American mixed martial arts promotion. In May 2017, the UFC announced White would hold the competition weekly on UFC Fight Pass (It has since been moved to ESPN+).

As with the earlier web series Looking for a Fight, the goal of the series is for White to scout talent for the UFC. Similar to The Ultimate Fighter none of the fighters involved will have existing UFC contracts. Licensed separately from the UFC with Dana White applying for a promoter's license, it was stated ahead of the license being approved that "this is not the UFC, this is not the UFC brand, but instead a promotion that will allow up-and-coming fighters the chance to showcase their talents in hopes that one day they may compete in the UFC."

The inaugural event took place on July 11, 2017. All events have been held at the UFC's home base of Las Vegas.

== List of seasons ==
Name	Ref	Start date	End date	# of contracts	# of events	Venue	Location
Season 10 (87-96)		August 11, 2026	October 13, 2026	46	10	Meta Apex Center	Las Vegas, Nevada, U.S.
Season 9 (77-86)		August 12, 2025	October 14, 2025	46	10	UFC Apex Center	Las Vegas, Nevada, U.S.
Season 8 (67-76)		August 13, 2024	October 15, 2024	42	10	UFC Apex Center	Las Vegas, Nevada, U.S.
Season 7 (57-66)		August 8, 2023	October 10, 2023	46	10	UFC Apex Center	Las Vegas, Nevada, U.S.
Season 6 (47-56)		July 26, 2022	September 27, 2022	43	10	UFC Apex Center	Las Vegas, Nevada, U.S.
Season 5 (37-46)		August 31, 2021	November 2, 2021	39	10	UFC Apex Center	Las Vegas, Nevada, U.S.
Season 4 (27-36)		August 4, 2020	November 17, 2020	37	10	UFC Apex Center	Las Vegas, Nevada, U.S.
Season 3 (17-26)		June 18, 2019	August 27, 2019	30	10	UFC Apex Center	Las Vegas, Nevada, U.S.
Season Brazil		August 24, 2018	September 7, 2018	11	3	UFC Training Center	Las Vegas, Nevada, U.S.
Season 2 (9-16)		June 12, 2018	August 7, 2018	23	8	UFC Training Center	Las Vegas, Nevada, U.S.
Season 1 (1-8)		July 11, 2017	August 29, 2017	16	8	UFC Training Center	Las Vegas, Nevada, U.S.

== List of contract winners ==
Season	Episode number																			
Season	1	Ref.	2	Ref.	3	Ref.	4	Ref.	5	Ref.	6	Ref.	7	Ref.	8	Ref.	9	Ref.	10	Ref.
10 (2026)	*Anthony Wint; *Bilal Hasan; *Tom Pagliarulo; *Joe Kropschot		*Kaik Brito; *Trent Miller; *Cristian Perez; *Alik Lorenz; *Roman Gabriel Puga; *Taner Trembley		*Alex Apodaca; *Guilherme Uriel; *Sean Clancy Jr. *Ronald Humphrey; *Nick Galanti		*Adam Darby; *Modestino Rodrigues; *Silvestre Sanchez; *Gabriel Lourenço; *Adam Livingston		*Quentin Pasley; *Isaac Moreno; *Martin Koźak; *Christian Natividad		*Mayton Perea; *Igor Cavalcanti; *Akbar Abdullaev; *Luis Hernandez		*Alvi Dasuyev; *Jaden Ortega; *Marcos Degli; *Piero Guaylupo; *Callum Connor; *Damian Piwowarczyk		*George Staines; *Adama Diop; *Aieza Ramos Bertolso; *Ian Escuza		*Preston LaGrange; *Sal Everett; *Roque Conceição; *Mateus Soares		*Smilla Sundell; *Luis Francischinelli; *Douglas da Lapa; *Greg Foster	
9 (2025)	*Ty Miller; *Baysangur Susurkaev		*José Mauro Delano; *Cameron Rowston; *Louis Lee Scott; *Josh Hokit; *Ramiro Jimenez		*Ryan Gandra; *Márcio Barbosa * Abdul-Rakhman Yakhyaev; *Manoel Sousa; *Donte Johnson		*Jean-Paul Lebosnoyani; *Cezary Oleksiejczuk; *Mandel Nallo; *Tommy McMillen		*Stephen Asplund; *Lerryan Douglas; *Samuel Sanches; *Shanelle Dyer; *Carol Foro		*Hecher Sosa; *Iwo Baraniewski; *Tommy Gantt; *Cody Chovancek		*Mantas Kondratavičius * Murtazali Magomedov * Jeisla Chaves; *Sofia Montenegro; *Javier Reyes; *Rafael Tobias		*Damian Pinas; *Louis Jourdain; *Christopher Alvidrez; *Kurtis Campbell		*Magomed Zaynukov; *Adrián Luna Martinetti; *Mark Vologdin; *Imanol Rodriguez; *Luis Felipe Dias; *Luke Fernandez		*Levi Rodrigues; *Juan Díaz; *Marwan Rahiki; *Michael Oliveira; *Wesley Schultz	
8 (2024)	*Mansur Abdul-Malik; *Bruno Lopes; *Jose Delgado; *Lone'er Kavanagh		*Andreas Gustafsson Berg; *Rizvan Kuniev; *Cortavious Romious; *Cody Haddon		*Andrey Pulyaev; *Bogdan Grad; *Marco Tulio; *Malcolm Wellmaker		*Ko Seok-hyun; *Djorden Ribeiro dos Santos; *Austin Bashi; Yuneisy Duben; *Quillan Salkilld		*Navajo Stirling; *Josias Musasa; *Nicolle Caliari		*Elijah Smith; *Tallison Teixeira; *Ateba Gautier; *Ahmad Hassanzada		*Danylo Voievodkin; *Daniel Frunza; *Kevin Christian; *Kevin Vallejos; *Alexia Thainara		*Diyar Nurgozhay; *Alberto Montes; *David Martínez; *Torrez Finney; *Jacobe Smith		*Artem Vakhitov; *Kody Steele; *Mario Pinto; *Islam Dulatov		*Nick Klein; *Luis Gurule; *Yadier del Valle; *Jonathan Micallef	
7 (2023)	*César Almeida; *Tom Nolan; *Caio Machado; *Payton Talbott; *Kevin Borjas		*Abdul-Kerim Al-Selwady; *Ibo Aslan; *Hyder Amil; *Eduarda Moura; *Charalampos Grigoriou		*Zachary Reese; *Oban Elliott; *Luis Pajuelo		*Carlos Prates; *Thomas Petersen; *Bolaji Oki		*Brendson Ribeiro; *Serhiy Sidey; *Dylan Budka; *Jean Silva; *Dione Barbosa		*James Llontop; Jhonata Diniz; *Steven Nguyen; *Julia Polastri; *Jean Matsumoto		*Shamil Gaziev; *Stephanie Luciano; *Kaynan Kruschewsky; *Igor da Silva		*Danny Barlow; *Danny Silva; *Angel Pacheco; *Ernesta Kareckaitė; *Carli Judice; *Vinicius Oliveira		*Rodolfo Bellato; *Victor Hugo Silva; *Magomed Gadzhiyasulov; *José Daniel Medina; Maurício Ruffy		*Ramon Taveras; *André Lima; *Connor Matthews; *MarQuel Mederos; *Lucas Rocha	
6 (2022)	*Joe Pyfer		*Chris Duncan; *Vinicius Salvador; *Francis Marshall; Waldo Cortes-Acosta; Billy Goff		*Jamal Pogues; *Erik Silva; *Clayton Carpenter		*Esteban Ribovics; *Claudio Ribeiro; *Jose Johnson; *Hailey Cowan; Nazim Sadykhov		*Mick Parkin; *Darrius Flowers; *Jesús Santos Aguilar; *Cameron Saaiman; *Denise Gomes		*Yusaku Kinoshita; *Sedriques Dumas; *Mateusz Rębecki; *Viktoriya Dudakova; *Blake Bilder		*Vitor Petrino; *Gabriel Bonfim; *Karl Williams; *Ismael Bonfim		*Farid Basharat; *Ikram Aliskerov; *Trevor Peek; *Bruna Brasil; *Daniel Marcos		*Brunno Ferreira; *Raul Rosas Jr. *Austen Lane; *Nurullo Aliev; Jafel Filho		*Bo Nickal; *Sam Patterson; *Jack Jenkins; *Rafael Ramos Estevam; *Mateus Mendonça	
5 (2021)	*Azamat Murzakanov; *Joanderson Brito; *Victor Altamirano; *Carlos Candelario; *AJ Fletcher		*Josh Quinlan; *Chidi Njokuani; *Saimon Oliveira; *C.J. Vergara; *Chad Anheliger		*Jailton Almeida; *Albert Duraev; *Łukasz Brzeski; *Jack Della Maddalena; *Jasmine Jasudavicius		*AJ Dobson; *Michael Morales; *Kleydson Rodrigues; *Victor Martinez		*Ihor Potieria; *Daniel Zellhuber		*Mike Malott; *Carlos Hernandez; *Fernie Garcia; *Genaro Valdéz		*Martin Buday; *Jake Hadley; *Slava Borshchev		*Armen Petrosyan; *Caio Borralho; *Piera Rodríguez; *Jonny Parsons		*Gadzhi Omargadzhiev; *Cristian Quiñonez; *Javid Basharat; *Karine Silva; *Manuel Torres		*Maheshate; *Yohan Lainesse	
4 (2020)	*Dustin Jacoby; *Uroš Medić; *Jordan Leavitt		*Dustin Stoltzfus; *Adrian Yañez; *Cory McKenna; *T.J. Laramie; *Impa Kasanganay		*Louis Cosce; *Cheyanne Vlismas; *Orion Cosce; *Josh Parisian		*Jamie Pickett; *Rafael Alves; *Jeff Molina; *Collin Huckbody		*Jimmy Flick; *Ronnie Lawrence; *William Knight		*Phil Hawes; *Drako Rodriguez; *Tafon Nchukwi; *Aliaskhab Khizriev		*Jordan Williams; *Collin Anglin; *Danyelle Wolf		*Carlos Ulberg; *Ignacio Bahamondes; *Luis Saldaña; *Jared Vanderaa		*Natan Levy; *Nikolas Motta; *Luana Pinheiro		*JP Buys; *Gloria de Paula; *Tucker Lutz; *Victoria Leonardo	
3 (2019)	*Punahele Soriano; *Yorgan de Castro		*Miles Johns; *Miguel Baeza		*Joe Solecki; *Antonio Trócoli; *Hunter Azure; *Maki Pitolo; *Jonathan Pearce		*Antônio Arroyo; *Ode' Osbourne; *Don'Tale Mayes; *Brendan Allen		*Sean Woodson; *Jamahal Hill; *Billy Quarantillo		*Aleksa Camur; *Aalon Cruz; *Tracy Cortez; *Rodrigo Nascimento		*Omar Morales; *Herbert Burns; *André Muniz		*Brok Weaver; *Sarah Alpar; Tony Gravely		*Philip Rowe		*Duško Todorović; *Peter Barrett; *T.J. Brown	
Brazil (2018)	*Rogério Bontorin; *Mayra Bueno Silva; *Sarah Frota; *Augusto Sakai		*Taila Santos; *Johnny Walker; *Marina Rodriguez		*Raulian Paiva; *Vinicius Moreira; *Luana Carolina; *Thiago Moisés															
2 (2018)	*Alonzo Menifield; *Greg Hardy		*Matt Sayles; *Anthony Hernandez; *Ryan Spann; Dwight Grant		*Antonina Shevchenko; *Te'Jovan Edwards		*Bevon Lewis; *Jordan Espinosa		*Maycee Barber; *Domingo Pilarte; *Edmen Shahbazyan		*Jimmy Crute; *Sodiq Yusuff; *Jeff Hughes		*Roosevelt Roberts; *Ian Heinisch; *Jordan Griffin; *Juan Adams		*Devonte Smith; *Kennedy Nzechukwu; *Bobby Moffett					
1 (2017)	*Kurt Holobaugh; *Boston Salmon		*Sean O'Malley		*Karl Roberson; *Geoff Neal		*Julian Marquez; *Brandon Davis		*Mike Rodríguez; *Alex Perez		*Charles Byrd; *Grant Dawson		*Benito Lopez; *Joby Sanchez		*Matt Frevola; *Lauren Mueller; *Allen Crowder					

== List of DWCS alumni ==
This page lists all fighters who have appeared on Dana White's Contender Series. The main table covers notable alumni, while the section below includes additional participants who have standalone Wikipedia articles but do not meet the notability criteria.

== List of DWCS records ==
=== UFC champions from DWCS ===
This is a list of fighters who earned a UFC contract through Dana White's Contender Series (DWCS) and subsequently won a UFC championship. As of 2026, four DWCS alumni have captured undisputed UFC gold.

#	Fighter	Div.	Signed	Event	Opponent	Title Won	Notes
1	(United States) Jamahal Hill	LHW	Jul 23, 2019	UFC 283	(Brazil) Glover Teixeira	Jan 21, 2023	First DWCS alumnus to win a UFC title.
2	(United States) Sean O'Malley	BW	Jul 18, 2017	UFC 292	(United States) Aljamain Sterling	Aug 19, 2023	First DWCS alumnus to successfully defend a UFC title (UFC 299).
3	(Australia) Jack Della Maddalena	WW	Sep 14, 2021	UFC 315	(Palestine) Belal Muhammad	May 10, 2025	Lost title to Islam Makhachev at UFC 322.
4	(New Zealand) Carlos Ulberg	LHW	Nov 4, 2020	UFC 327	(Czech Republic) Jiří Procházka	Apr 11, 2026	Current champion as of April 2026.

=== UFC title challengers from DWCS ===
This is a list of fighters who appeared on DWCS who have challenged or will challenge for a UFC championship.

#	Fighter	Div.	DWCS date	Event	Opponent	Date	Notes
1	(United States) Alex Perez	FLW	Aug 8, 2017	UFC 255	(Brazil) Deiveson Figueiredo	Nov 21, 2020	First DWCS alumnus to challenge for a UFC title.
2	(Brazil) Taila Santos	W-FLW	Aug 11, 2018	UFC 275	(Kyrgyzstan) Valentina Shevchenko	Jun 12, 2022	First DWCS female alumnus to challenge for a UFC title.
3	(Brazil) Mayra Bueno Silva	W-BW	Aug 10, 2018	UFC 297	(United States) Raquel Pennington	Jan 20, 2024	First to challenge for the UFC Women's Flyweight title.
4	(Brazil) Diego Lopes	FTW	Aug 31, 2021	UFC 314	(Australia) Alexander Volkanovski	Apr 12, 2025	Two-time title challenger. Signed with UFC in May 2023.
5	(United States) Josh Hokit	HW	Aug 19, 2025	UFC 334	(France) Ciryl Gane	Nov 14, 2026	First DWCS alumnus to challenge for the UFC Heavyweight title.
6	(Ecuador) Michael Morales	WW	Sep 21, 2021	UFC 336	(Brazil) Carlos Prates	Jan 30, 2027	Welterweight interim title challenger.
7	(Brazil) Carlos Prates	WW	Aug 29, 2023	UFC 336	(Ecuador) Michael Morales	Jan 30, 2027	Welterweight interim title challenger.

=== Most UFC wins among DWCS alumni ===
UFC win totals for fighters who earned contracts through Dana White's Contender Series.

**Bold** - Active fighters

Updated as of October 10, 2026 after UFC Fight Night: Allen vs. Duncan.

In any bout
#	Fighter	Division	UFC Wins
1	(United States) **Kevin Holland**	WW \ MW	16
1	(United States) **Brendan Allen**	MW \ LHW	16

=== Most UFC losses among DWCS alumni ===
**Bold** - Active fighters

Updated as of October 31, 2026 after UFC Fight Night: Moicano vs. Nolan.

In any bout
#	Fighter	Division	UFC Losses
1	(United States) Vince Morales	BW \ FW	9
1	(United States) Julian Erosa	FW \ LW	9
2	(United States) **Cody Brundage**	MW \ LHW	8
2	(Jamaica) **Ode' Osbourne**	FLW \ BW	8

=== Combined most significant strikes landed - In a single bout ===
The lightweight bout between Piero Guaylupo and Callum Connor on September 22, 2026 at DWCS 93 set numerous records.

#	Fight			Div.	Event	Date	Combined Strikes
1	(Peru) Piero Guaylupo	def.	(England) Callum Connor	LW	DWCS 93	Sept 22, 2026	474 (Note: Most landed in a UFC/DWCS lightweight bout, regardless of scheduled rounds) (Note: Most landed in any three-round UFC/DWCS bout) (Note: Second most landed in any UFC/DWCS bout, behind Max Holloway vs. Calvin Kattar (578))
2	(United States) Danny Silva	def.	(United States) Angel Pacheco	FTW	DWCS 64	Sept 26, 2023	401
3	(Lithuania) Ernesta Kareckaite	def.	(United States) Carli Judice	W-FLW	DWCS 64	Sept 26, 2023	352 (Note: Most landed in a women's bout in DWCS history)

=== Most significant strikes landed - In a single bout ===
Updated to September 22, 2026 (after DWCS 93).

#	Fighter	Opponent	Div.	Event	Date	Strikes
1	(England) Callum Connor	(Peru) Piero Guaylupo	LW	DWCS 93	Sept 22, 2026	265
2	(Russia) Magomed Zaynukov	(Brazil) Lucas Caldas	LW	DWCS 85	Oct 7, 2025	235
3	(Peru) Piero Guaylupo	(England) Callum Connor	LW	DWCS 93	Sept 22, 2026	209
4	(United States) Danny Silva	(United States) Angel Pacheco	FTW	DWCS 64	Sept 26, 2023	204

=== Fastest knockout ===
#	Fighter	Opponent	Div.	Event	Date	Time
1	(United States) Alonzo Menifield	(United States) Dashawn Boatwright	LHW	DWCS 9	Jun 12, 2018	0:08

=== Fastest submission ===
#	Fighter	Opponent	Div.	Event	Date	Time
1	(United States) Ryan Spann	(Argentina) Emiliano Sordi	LHW	DWCS 10	Jun 19, 2018	0:26

=== Youngest contract winner ===
#	Fighter	Div.	Birthday	Awarded	Age
1	(Mexico) Raul Rosas Jr.	BW	Oct 8, 2004	Sep 20, 2022	17 years, 347 days

=== Oldest contract winner ===
#	Fighter	Div.	Birthday	Awarded	Age
1	(Canada) Mandel Nallo	LW	Jul 26, 1989	Sep 2, 2025	36 years, 38 days

== See also ==
- List of Dana White's Contender Series alumni
- List of current UFC fighters
- List of UFC champions
