= Magomed Zaynukov =

Russian mixed martial artist (born 1995)

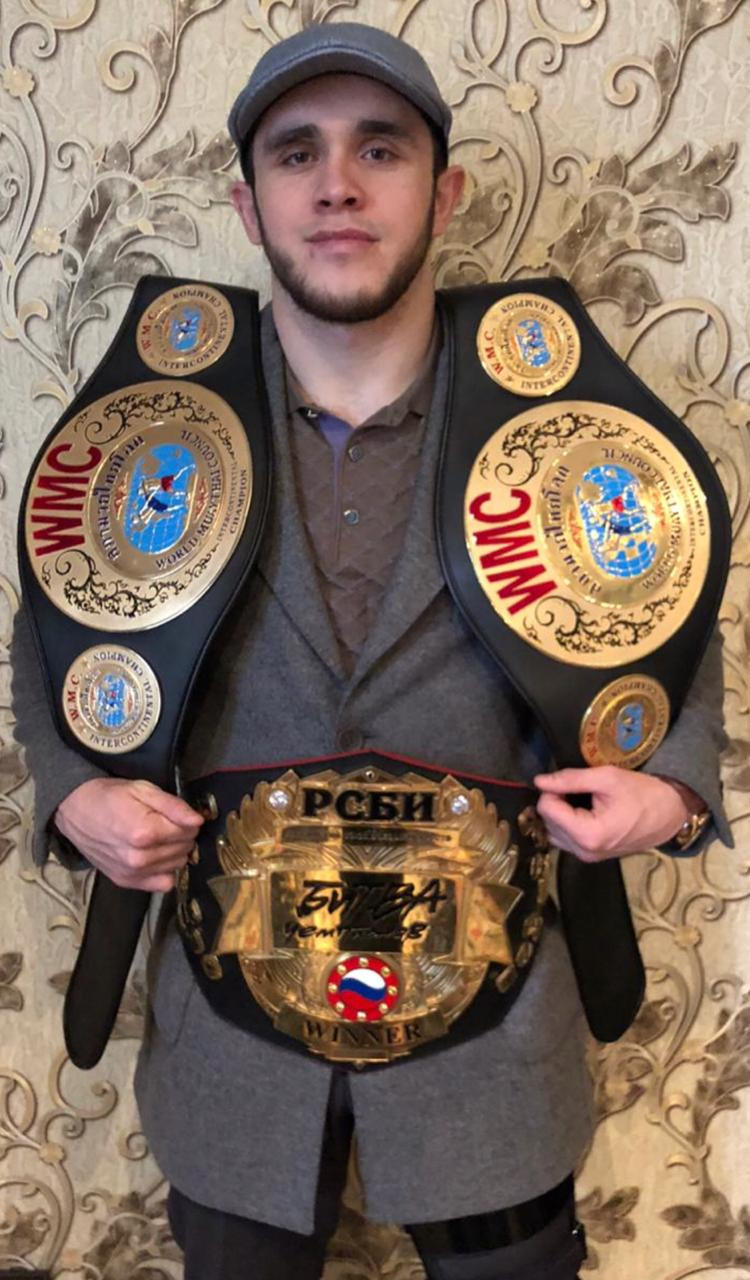
- Born: Magomed Bekshievich Zainukov; January 2, 1995 (age 31); Botlikhsky, Dagestan, Russia
- Native name: Магомед Зайнуков
- Other names: Wild Chanco
- Height: 5 ft 10 in (178 cm)
- Weight: 155 lb (70 kg; 11 st 1 lb)
- Division: Lightweight
- Reach: 68 in (173 cm)
- Style: Muay Thai, Kickboxing
- Fighting out of: Makhachkala, Russia
- Team: Eagles MMA; Abdulmanap Nurmagomedov School
- Years active: 2014–2019 (Muay Thai); 2021–present (MMA)

Kickboxing record
- Total: 21
- Wins: 18
- By knockout: 10
- Losses: 3
- By knockout: 1

Mixed martial arts record
- Total: 9
- Wins: 9
- By knockout: 5
- By decision: 4
- Losses: 0

Other information
- Mixed martial arts record from Sherdog

Magomed Bekshievich Zaynukov (Russian: Магомед Бекшиевич Зайнуков; born January 2, 1995) is a Russian mixed martial artist and former Muay Thai kickboxer. He is currently signed to the Ultimate Fighting Championship in the Lightweight division. In his Muay Thai career, Zaynukov was a two-time IFMA world champion and a WMC Intercontinental champion.

== Muay Thai career ==
In Muay Thai, Zaynukov was a four-time Russian champion, a European champion, a two-time IFMA world champion, and won the WMC Intercontinental Championship. He regularly trained with Jason Wilnis. For his achievements, Zaynukov was named a Honored Master of Sports of Russia. Zaynukov defeated world champion Sudsakorn Sor Klinmee in December 2018, in a bout held in Perm, Russia.

== Mixed martial arts career ==
=== Early career ===
Although from a Muay Thai background, Zaynukov was part of Abdulmanap Nurmagomedov's camp in Dagestan known for its high-level wrestling. He made his professional mixed martial arts debut in 2021 and by 2025 he had an unbeaten 6–0 record. He won his first five fights by first-round stoppage. Zaynukov stated to MMA Fighting in 2025 that he trained with fighters such as Islam Makhachev, Usman Nurmagomedov, and Gadzhi Rabadanov.

Zaynukov faced fellow undefeated fighter Shakhmar Sadygov in a featured bout at UAE Warriors 58 in February 2025. He won by unanimous decision. Zaynukov subsequently competed on Dana White's Contender Series in October 2025. He defeated Lucas Caldas by unanimous decision and was awarded a contract in the Ultimate Fighting Championship. Zaynukov broke the Contender Series record for most significant strikes landed (235) in a lightweight bout and was congratulated afterwards by his coach Khabib Nurmagomedov. This record was broken in September 2026, when Callum Connor landed 265 significant strikes in his lightweight bout with Piero Guaylupo at Dana White's Contender Series 93.

=== Ultimate Fighting Championship ===
Zaynukov made his UFC debut against Damian Rzepecki on July 25, 2026, at UFC Fight Night 282. He won the fight by unanimous decision.

Zaynukov was scheduled to face Manoel Sousa on November 21, 2026 at UFC Fight Night 294. However, Zaynukov stated he had not signed a contract for the fight and would not compete again in 2026 due to an operation, leaving it unclear whether a replacement opponent would be found for Sousa.

Zaynukov is scheduled to face promotional newcomer Piero Guaylupo on January 16, 2027 at UFC Fight Night 296.

== Personal life ==
Magomed Zaynukov was born on January 2, 1995. He is from the village of Chanko in Dagestan, Russia. As a result, he was nicknamed "Wild Chanco". In 2024, Zaynukov's teammate Islam Makhachev referred to him as "Chanco" but this was misinterpreted as "John Pork", which is an internet meme about a calling pig. Magomed said in October 2025 that he disliked the name "John Pork" and requested that fans do not call him that.

== Championships and awards ==
=== Muay Thai ===
==== Professional ====
- World Muaythai Council
  - 2019 WMC Intercontinental 70 kg champion
  - 2018 WMC Intercontinental 72.5 kg champion

==== Amateur ====
- International Federation of Muaythai Associations
  - 2017 IFMA World Muaythai Championships 67 kg (bronze)
  - 2016 IFMA World Muaythai Championships 67 kg (gold)
  - 2015 IFMA World Muaythai Championships 67 kg (gold)
  - 2014 IFMA World Muaythai Championships 67 kg (bronze)
  - 2013 IFMA World Muaythai Championships Junior 63.5 kg (bronze)
  - 2012 IFMA World Muaythai Championships Junior 63.5 kg (bronze)

== Mixed martial arts record ==
Professional record breakdown
9 matches	9 wins	0 losses
By knockout	5	0
By decision	4	0

Res.	Record	Opponent	Method	Event	Date	Round	Time	Location	Notes
Win	9–0	Damian Rzepecki	Decision (unanimous)	UFC Fight Night: Ankalaev vs. Guskov	July 25, 2026	3	5:00	Abu Dhabi, United Arab Emirates	
Win	8–0	Lucas Caldas	Decision (unanimous)	Dana White's Contender Series 85	October 7, 2025	3	5:00	Las Vegas, Nevada, United States	
Win	7–0	Shakhmar Sadygov	Decision (unanimous)	UAE Warriors 58	February 22, 2025	3	5:00	Al Ain, United Arab Emirates	Return to Lightweight.
Win	6–0	Wilian Poles	Decision (unanimous)	UAE Warriors 51	July 27, 2024	3	5:00	Abu Dhabi, United Arab Emirates	Catchweight (160 lb) bout.
Win	5–0	Erzhan Manarbekov	TKO (punches)	RCC Intro 31	March 9, 2024	1	4:09	Yekaterinburg, Russia	Catchweight (161 lb) bout.
Win	4–0	Tamirlan Ashakhanov	TKO (punches)	AMC Fight Nights 121	July 14, 2023	2	4:29	Moscow, Russia	Catchweight (161 lb) bout.
Win	3–0	Maksatbek Akzhigit Uulu	KO (punch)	Leki FC 2	December 13, 2022	1	1:40	Moscow, Russia	Welterweight debut.
Win	2–0	Nasratullah Akhondzada	TKO (punches)	Eagle FC: Selection 4	January 29, 2022	1	2:30	Kizilyurt, Russia	
Win	1–0	Ramiz Ismailov	TKO (punches)	Eagle FC: Selection 1	February 20, 2021	1	N/A	Kaspiysk, Russia	Lightweight debut.

== Muay Thai and kickboxing record ==
Professional Muay Thai and Kickboxing Record
18 Wins (10 (T)KOs), 3 Losses
Date	Result	Opponent	Event	Location	Method	Round	Time
2019-11-01	Win	(Iran) Masoud Minaei	Battle of Champions 11	Moscow, Russia	TKO (Doctor stoppage)	2	1:40
Wins the WMC Intercontinental -70kg title.
2019-08-25	Win	(China)	YungFeng Showdown	China	Decision	3	3:00
2018-12-22	Win	(Thailand) Sudsakorn Sor Klinmee	MUAYTHAI FACTORY	Russia	Decision (Unanimous)	5	3:00
Wins the vacant WMC Intercontinental -72.5kg title.
2018-09-22	Win	(China) Miao Wei	YungFeng Showdown	China	Decision	3	3:00
2018-07-28	Win	(China) Yang Hao Dong	YungFeng Showdown	China	Decision	3	3:00
2017-12-23	Win	(Iran) Keivan Soleimani	YungFeng Showdown	China	TKO	1	
2017-	Win	(China) Guo Dechao		China	Decision	3	3:00
2016-03-12	Loss	(Thailand) Yodpayak Sitsongpeenong	SUPER MUAYTHAI	Bangkok, Thailand	Decision	3	3:00
2016-02-28	Loss	(Thailand) Sinsamut Klinmee	SUPER MUAYTHAI	Bangkok, Thailand	KO (High kick)	2	
2016-01-24	Loss	(Thailand) Yodpayak Sitsongpeenong	SUPER MUAYTHAI	Bangkok, Thailand	Decision	3	3:00
2016-01-03	Win	(Thailand) Weerasak	SUPER MUAYTHAI, Tournament Final	Bangkok, Thailand	KO (Left hook to the body)	2	
2016-01-03	Win	(South Korea) Yoon	SUPER MUAYTHAI, Tournament Semifinal	Bangkok, Thailand	KO (Elbow)	1	
2015-12-05	Win	(Thailand) Petchmankong P.K.SaenchaiMuaythaiGym	SUPER MUAYTHAI	Bangkok, Thailand	KO (Punches)	1	
Legend: Win Loss Draw/No contest Notes

Amateur Muay Thai Record
Date	Result	Opponent	Event	Location	Method	Round	Time
2017-05-10	Loss	(Thailand) Mana Samchaiyaphum	IFMA World Championships 2017, Semifinals	Minsk, Belarus	Decision (29:28)	3	3:00
Wins 2017 IFMA World Championships -67kg Bronze Medal.
2017-05-07	Win	(Iran) Kaveh Soleymani	IFMA World Championships 2017, Quarterfinals	Minsk, Belarus	Decision (30:27)	3	3:00
2017-05-05	Win	(Kyrgyzstan) Bekzhan Matysaev	IFMA World Championships 2017, First Round	Minsk, Belarus	Decision (30:27)	3	3:00
2016-05-28	Win	(Thailand) Sitthichot Yutthapong	IFMA World Championships 2016, Final	Jonkoping, Sweden	Decision (29:28)	3	3:00
Wins 2016 IFMA World Championships -67kg Gold Medal.
2016-05-26	Win	(Finland) Sosom Surachai	IFMA World Championships 2016, Semifinals	Jonkoping, Sweden	Decision (30:27)	3	3:00
2016-05-24	Win	(France) Fabien Seghiri	IFMA World Championships 2016, Quarterfinals	Jonkoping, Sweden	TKO	1	
2015-08-	Win	(Australia) Kurt Staiti	IFMA World Championships 2015, Final	Bangkok, Thailand	Decision	3	3:00
Wins 2016 IFMA World Championships -67kg Gold Medal.
2015-08-	Win	(Thailand) Piya Fueangfu	IFMA World Championships 2015, Semifinals	Bangkok, Thailand	Decision	3	3:00
2015-08-	Win	(Turkey) Ali Batmaz	IFMA World Championships 2015, Quarterfinals	Bangkok, Thailand	TKO	3	
2015-08-	Win	(Belarus) Dmitry Varats	IFMA World Championships 2015, First Round	Bangkok, Thailand	Decision	3	3:00
2014-05-	Loss	(Turkey) Ali Batmaz	IFMA World Championships 2014, Semifinals	Langkawi, Malaysia	Decision	3	3:00
Wins 2014 IFMA World Championships -67kg Bronze Medal.
2014-05-	Win	(Poland) Marcin Lepkowski	IFMA World Championships 2014, Quarterfinals	Langkawi, Malaysia	Decision	3	3:00
Legend: Win Loss Draw/No contest Notes

== See also ==
- List of male mixed martial artists
- Eagle Fighting Championship
- 2022 in Eagle Fighting Championship
- 2016 IFMA World Muaythai Championships
