= UFC 332 =

Mixed martial arts event in 2026

UFC 332: Silva vs. Wang
- The poster for UFC 332: Silva vs. Wang
- Promotion: Ultimate Fighting Championship
- Date: October 3, 2026
- Venue: Delta Center
- City: Salt Lake City, Utah, United States
- Attendance: 16,492
- Total gate: $2,707,768

Event chronology
UFC Fight Night: Rosas Jr. vs. Barcelos	UFC 332: Silva vs. Wang	UFC Fight Night: Allen vs. Duncan

UFC 332: Silva vs. Wang was a mixed martial arts event produced by the Ultimate Fighting Championship that took place on October 3, 2026, at the Delta Center in Salt Lake City, Utah, United States.

== Background ==
The event marked the promotion's fifth visit to Salt Lake City and first since UFC 307 in October 2024. This was the first time the entire main card of a numbered event aired on CBS.

A UFC Women's Flyweight Championship bout for the vacant title between Natália Silva and Wang Cong headlined the event. The original championship bout was supposed to be between current two-time champion Valentina Shevchenko and Silva, which was initially scheduled to serve as the co-main event and later moved to the main event. However, Shevchenko withdrew due to a ligament injury to her back and shoulder that will leave her sidelined for a year, which led to the cancellation of the bout and the title being vacated.

A middleweight bout between former UFC Middleweight Championship challenger Marvin Vettori and Ismail Naurdiev was added to this event. The pairing had been originally slated for UFC Fight Night: Fiziev vs. Torres in June, but Vettori was forced to withdraw due to a broken rib, which resulted in the bout's postponement.

Marcus McGhee and Bernardo Sopaj were expected to meet in a bantamweight bout at the preliminary card. However, Sopaj pulled out due to injury just three days before the event and was replaced by promotional newcomer Anthony Romero in a featherweight contest.

At the weigh-ins, Esteban Ribovics weighed in at 156.5 pounds, half a pound over the lightweight non-title fight limit. His bout proceeded at catchweight and he was fined 20 percent of his purse, which went to his opponent King Green.

== Results ==
Main card (Paramount+ / CBS)
Weight class				Method	Round	Time	Notes
Women's Flyweight	Natália Silva	def.	Wang Cong	Decision (unanimous) (48–47, 48–47, 49–46)	5	5:00	(Note: For the vacant UFC Women's Flyweight Championship.)
Bantamweight	Payton Talbott	def.	Deiveson Figueiredo	TKO (punches)	1	2:09
Catchweight (156.5 lb)	Esteban Ribovics	def.	King Green	TKO (punches)	1	4:08
Welterweight	Roberto Soldić	def.	Khaos Williams	Decision (unanimous) (29–28, 29–27, 29–27)	3	5:00
Middleweight	Roman Kopylov	def.	Ateba Gautier	KO (punches)	1	3:12
Preliminary card (Paramount+)
Flyweight	Imanol Rodríguez	def.	Alden Coria	TKO (front kick to the body and punches)	1	3:11
Middleweight	Damian Pinas	def.	Andrey Pulyaev	KO (punch)	1	1:15
Featherweight	Marcus McGhee	def.	Anthony Romero	TKO (punches)	1	4:58
Heavyweight	Anthony Wint	def.	Lucas Armand	TKO (punches)	1	0:23
Early preliminary card (Paramount+)
Heavyweight	Johnny Walker	def.	Mick Parkin	KO (knee)	1	3:35
Welterweight	Jacobe Smith	def.	Bruce Whitehead	KO (punches)	1	1:32
Lightweight	Alexander Hernandez	def.	Rafael dos Anjos	TKO (punches)	2	3:12
Middleweight	Ismail Naurdiev	def.	Marvin Vettori	Decision (unanimous) (29–28, 29–28, 29–28)	3	5:00
Welterweight	Eric Nolan	def.	Court McGee	KO (punch)	3	3:26

== Bonus awards ==
The following fighters received $100,000 bonuses. The other finishes received $25,000 additional bonuses.

- Fight of the Night: No bonus awarded.
- Performance of the Night: Roman Kopylov, Imanol Rodríguez, Damian Pinas, and Johnny Walker

== Records set ==
With eleven knockouts, the event broke the UFC record for most knockouts in a single UFC event, surpassing UFC Fight Night: Imavov vs. Borralho.

The event also broke the modern UFC record for most first-round knockouts in a single event with nine.

In addition, the event set records for the most consecutive first-round knockouts with seven, the most consecutive knockouts in a modern-era UFC event with eight and the most knockdowns landed in a single event with sixteen.

== See also ==
- 2026 in UFC
- List of current UFC fighters
- List of UFC events
