= Josh Hokit =

American mixed martial artist (born 1997)

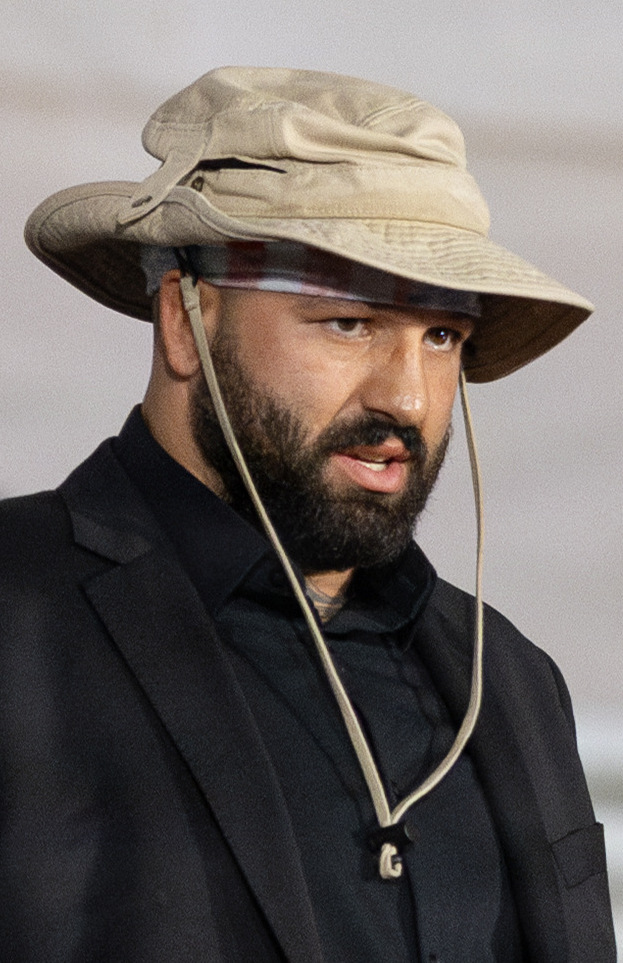
- Hokit in 2026
- Born: Joshua Seth Hokit; November 12, 1997 (age 29); Bakersfield, California, U.S.
- Other names: The Incredible Hok
- Height: 6 ft 1 in (185 cm)
- Weight: 232 lb (105 kg; 16 st 8 lb)
- Division: Heavyweight
- Reach: 73 in (185 cm)
- Fighting out of: Albuquerque, New Mexico, U.S.
- Team: Jackson Wink MMA Academy
- Years active: 2023–present (MMA)

Mixed martial arts record
- Total: 11
- Wins: 10
- By knockout: 6
- By submission: 3
- By decision: 1
- Losses: 1
- By decision: 1

Other information
- Website: theincrediblehok.com
- Mixed martial arts record from Sherdog

Joshua Seth Hokit (/ˈhoʊkɪt/ HOH-kit; born November 12, 1997) is an American professional mixed martial artist and former American football player who currently competes in the Heavyweight division of the Ultimate Fighting Championship (UFC). He formerly competed in Bellator MMA. As of October 24, 2026, he is #5 in the Meta UFC heavyweight rankings.

Prior to competing in MMA, Hokit was an All-American wrestler, and played American football as a tight end and fullback in college football, at Fresno State. He was signed by the San Francisco 49ers as an undrafted free agent in 2020.

== Early life and education ==
Hokit was born on November 12, 1997, in Bakersfield, California. He grew up in Wasco before moving to Clovis. He attended Clovis High School, and participated in wrestling and football. As a senior in wrestling, he peaked at number three in the nation. He originally accepted a wrestling scholarship to Drexel University, but changed his mind when he learned they did not have a football team.

== Football & Wrestling career ==
=== College ===
Hokit walked-on at Fresno State University where he competed in football and wrestling. As a freshman on the football team, he was used as a linebacker, fullback, running back, and on special teams; he was mainly used on offense in subsequent seasons. He was Fresno State's second-leading rusher with 583 yards and also placed ninth in the Mountain West Conference with seven rushing touchdowns as a sophomore. After the football season ended, Hokit returned to wrestling, placing fifth in the Big 12 Conference championships. In his junior year, he led the wrestling team with 27 wins, becoming their first All-American selection since Mario Botelho in 2003. In 2019, as a senior on the football team, Hokit ran for 287 yards and nine touchdowns, second on the team, and served as captain for the final four games of the year. He also finished his senior wrestling season as a second-team NWCA All-American after leading Fresno with 24 wins. In his college football career, Hokit totaled 1,260 rushing yards and 17 touchdowns.

=== Professional ===
Josh Hokit
Profile
- Position: Tight end / Fullback

Personal information
- Listed height: 6 ft 1 in (1.85 m)
- Listed weight: 225 lb (102 kg)

Career information
- High school: Clovis (CA)
- College: Fresno State
- NFL draft: 2020: undrafted

Career history
- San Francisco 49ers (2020–2021)*; Arizona Cardinals (2022)*
- * Offseason or practice squad member only
- Stats at Pro Football Reference

==== San Francisco 49ers ====
After going unselected in the 2020 NFL draft, Hokit was signed by the San Francisco 49ers as an undrafted free agent. He was waived at the final roster cuts but re-signed to the practice squad the next day. He was placed on the COVID-19/reserve list on December 23, and activated on December 28. Hokit was signed to a futures contract on January 4, 2021. He was waived at the 2021 final roster cuts, but re-signed to the practice squad the next day.

He was placed on the reserve/COVID-19 list on January 11, 2022. He signed a reserve/future contract with the 49ers on February 2. Hokit was waived on August 15.

==== Arizona Cardinals ====
On August 18, 2022, Hokit signed with the Arizona Cardinals, but was waived five days later.

== Mixed martial arts career ==
=== Bellator MMA ===
On March 1, 2023, it was announced that Hokit had signed with Bellator MMA to start his MMA career.

Hokit made his debut against Spencer Smith on October 7, 2023, at Bellator 300. He won the fight via an arm-triangle submission in the third round.

For his second professional bout, Hokit faced Sean Rose on September 7, 2024, at Bellator Champions Series 4. He won the fight via an armbar submission in the second round.

=== Ultimate Fighting Championship ===
After winning three fights under the Legacy Fighting Alliance banner, Hokit was booked to fight on season 9 of Dana White's Contender Series on August 19, 2025. He faced Guilherme Uriel and won the fight via TKO in the second round, subsequently receiving a UFC contract from Dana White.

Hokit faced promotional newcomer Max Gimenis on November 8, 2025 at UFC Fight Night 264. He won the fight by technical knockout early in the first round. This fight earned him his first Performance of the Night award.

Hokit faced Denzel Freeman on January 24, 2026, at UFC 324. He won the fight via technical knockout due to retirement in round one. This fight earned him a $100,000 Performance of the Night award.

Hokit faced Curtis Blaydes on April 11, 2026 at UFC 327. Hokit earned a unanimous decision victory in a bout that was widely cited by media outlets as a Fight of the Year contender. This fight earned him two $100,000 bonuses for Performance of the Night and Fight of the Night, totaling $200,000. Hokit set a UFC record with Curtis Blaydes for most combined significant strikes in a UFC heavyweight bout, landing 177 of the 351 total.

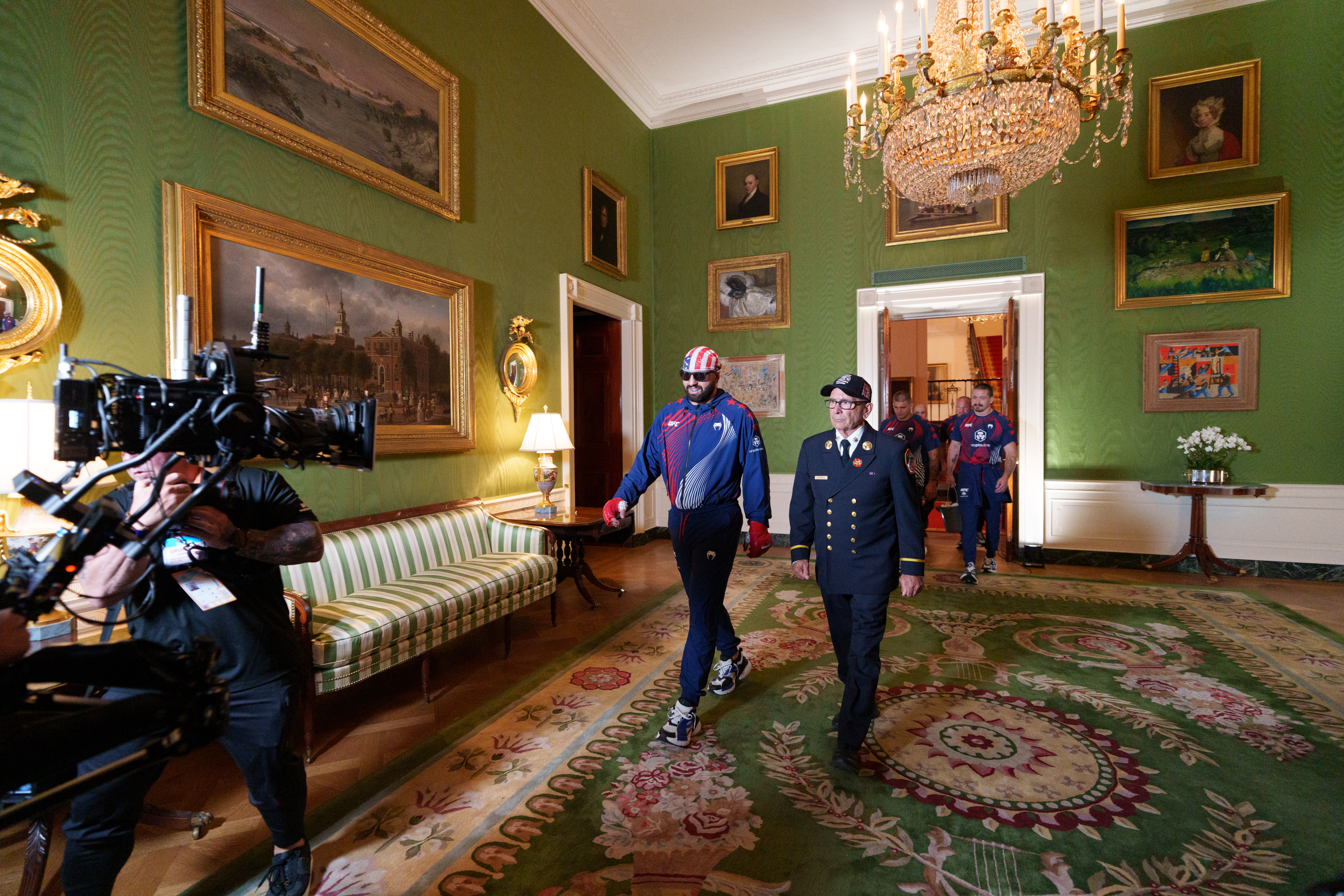
Hokit during the UFC Freedom 250 event

Following his bout and on the night of UFC 327, it was announced that Hokit was scheduled to face Derrick Lewis on June 14, 2026 at UFC Freedom 250. Hokit won the fight by technical knockout in the second round.

Hokit challenged Ciryl Gane for the UFC Heavyweight Championship at UFC 334 on November 14, 2026. He lost the bout by unanimous decision. This fight earned him another $100,000 Fight of the Night award.

== Press conference and interview controversies ==
Hokit has a history of controversial remarks during post-fight interviews, dating back to his tenure in Legacy Fighting Alliance (LFA). Following wins in LFA, Hokit made several controversial remarks, including labeling former first lady Michelle Obama "a man" and criticizing the participation of transgender women in sports, stating that they "belong" in the Octagon with him "because you need to get your ass whooped."

This pattern continued following his TKO victory at UFC 324—the first UFC event to be streamed live on Paramount+—where Hokit responded to the idea of "losing in a fist fight" by stating, "N-word [sic], please." During the same interview, he called out Waldo Cortes-Acosta, labeling him a "deadbeat father not to one kid, but to nine," and concluded by stating, "And P.S., Brittney Griner is a man."

The UFC 324 remarks drew laughter and cheers from the live crowd; post-fight interviewer Joe Rogan responded while laughing, "Brittney Griner catching strays. She doesn't deserve that." However, the interview was widely criticized by media outlets, and Dana White, CEO of the UFC, later expressed disapproval, stating, "I heard about it. I didn’t see it. I don’t love it." A video of the interview was subsequently deleted from the official UFC Asia social media account on X.

At the UFC Freedom 250 press conference, Hokit interrupted the event in a "bizarre appearance" and "pretended to be subdued" in an attempt to get attention from the media.

In a post-fight interview with Joe Rogan following his win at UFC Freedom 250, Hokit commented, "Now listen, Alex Pereira, I'm going to chama on your mama...and lastly, Michelle Obama is a man! Am I right, America?" White later condemned the remarks as “fucking gross”, “moronic”, and “inappropriate”.

== Championships and accomplishments ==
- Ultimate Fighting Championship
  - Fight of the Night (Two times) vs. Curtis Blaydes and Ciryl Gane
  - Performance of the Night (Three times) vs. Max Gimenis, Denzel Freeman and Curtis Blaydes
  - UFC heavyweight bout records
    - Most significant strikes landed in a three-round heavyweight bout (177) (vs. Curtis Blaydes)
    - Third most significant strikes landed in any heavyweight bout (177) (vs. Curtis Blaydes)
    - Most significant head strikes landed in a three-round heavyweight bout (164) (vs. Curtis Blaydes)
    - Third most total strikes attempted (384) (vs. Ciryl Gane)
    - Second most takedowns attempted (30) (vs. Ciryl Gane)
    - Fifth most significant strikes attempted (293) (vs. Curtis Blaydes)
    - Fifth most distance strikes landed (146) (vs. Curtis Blaydes)

== Mixed martial arts record ==
Professional record breakdown
11 matches	10 wins	1 loss
By knockout	6	0
By submission	3	0
By decision	1	1

Res.	Record	Opponent	Method	Event	Date	Round	Time	Location	Notes
Loss	10–1	Ciryl Gane	Decision (unanimous)	UFC 334	November 14, 2026	5	5:00	New York City, New York, United States	For the UFC Heavyweight Championship. Fight of the Night.
Win	10–0	Derrick Lewis	TKO (punches)	UFC Freedom 250	June 14, 2026	2	4:09	Washington, D.C., United States	
Win	9–0	Curtis Blaydes	Decision (unanimous)	UFC 327	April 11, 2026	3	5:00	Miami, Florida, United States	Performance of the Night. Fight of the Night.
Win	8–0	Denzel Freeman	TKO (retirement)	UFC 324	January 24, 2026	1	4:59	Las Vegas, Nevada, United States	Performance of the Night.
Win	7–0	Max Gimenis	TKO (punches)	UFC Fight Night: Bonfim vs. Brown	November 8, 2025	1	0:56	Las Vegas, Nevada, United States	Performance of the Night.
Win	6–0	Guilherme Uriel	TKO (elbows)	Dana White's Contender Series 78	August 19, 2025	2	1:06	Las Vegas, Nevada, United States	
Win	5–0	Eric Lunsford	TKO (punches)	LFA 208	May 9, 2025	1	2:00	Santa Cruz, California, United States	Catchweight (269.6 lb) bout; Lunsford missed weight.
Win	4–0	Ezekiel Latu	Submission (rear-naked choke)	LFA 203	March 6, 2025	1	0:42	Las Vegas, Nevada, United States	
Win	3–0	John Lopez	TKO (punches)	LFA 199	January 10, 2025	1	2:53	Lemoore, California, United States	
Win	2–0	Sean Rose	Submission (armbar)	Bellator Champions Series 4	September 7, 2024	1	4:58	San Diego, California, United States	
Win	1–0	Spencer Smith	Submission (arm-triangle choke)	Bellator 300	October 7, 2023	3	3:48	San Diego, California, United States	Heavyweight debut.

== See also ==
- List of current UFC fighters
- List of Dana White's Contender Series alumni
- List of male mixed martial artists
