= Abdul-Rakhman Yakhyaev =

Russian-born Turkish mixed martial artist (born 2001)

- Born: Abdul Rakhman Yakhyaev; 3 January 2001 (age 25); Tsotsi-Yurt, Chechnya, Russia
- Other names: The Hunter
- Nationality: Turkish
- Height: 6 ft 2 in (1.88 m)
- Weight: 205 lb (93 kg; 14 st 9 lb)
- Division: Light heavyweight
- Reach: 79 in (200 cm)
- Style: Mixed martial arts
- Stance: Orthodox
- Fighting out of: Istanbul, Turkey; Nurnberg, Germany
- Team: MMA Nürnberg
- Years active: 2021–present

Mixed martial arts record
- Total: 11
- Wins: 11
- By knockout: 5
- By submission: 5
- By decision: 1
- Losses: 0

Other information
- Mixed martial arts record from Sherdog
- Last updated on: 23 October 2026

Abdul-Rakhman Yakhyaev (born 3 January 2001) is a Russian-born Turkish mixed martial artist who currently competes in the Light Heavyweight division of the Ultimate Fighting Championship (UFC). As of October 24, 2026, he is #13 in the Meta UFC light heavyweight rankings.

== Early life and education ==
Abdul-Rakhman Yakhyaev was born in Tsotsi-Yurt, Chechnya, Russia. He began training in mixed martial arts and combat sambo at the age of 13 at a sports school in the Urus-Martan district of Chechnya. He later earned a degree in banking and worked as a plumber before pursuing a professional fighting career.

Yakhyaev achieved the Russian title of Master of Sports in combat sambo and mixed martial arts.

At the age of 20, he moved to Turkey on his own and began studying financial economics at university. After graduating, he worked full time as a plumber while training intensively in martial arts in the evenings, leading an exhausting lifestyle.

== Mixed martial arts career ==
=== Early career ===
Before joining the Ultimate Fighting Championship, he competed in the ACA Young Eagles and Khan Fight promotions compiling a record of 4-0.

Yakhyaev subsequently signed with Ares Fighting Championship. In July 2024, he defeated Paulin Begai by guillotine choke in the first round at Ares 23 to win the vacant Ares light heavyweight championship. He defended the title in September 2024, submitting Jacky Jeanne by rear-naked choke at Ares 25.

=== Ultimate Fighting Championship (2025–present) ===
Yakhyaev was booked to fight on season 9 of Dana White's Contender Series on August 26, 2025. He faced Alik Lorenz and won the fight via technical knockout in the fist round, subsequently receiving a UFC contract from Dana White.

Yakhyaev made his UFC debut on November 22, 2025 at UFC Fight Night 265 in Qatar, where he faced Rafael Cerqueira. He won by rear-naked choke in 33 seconds of the first round. The finish set a record for the fastest submission by a light heavyweight in modern UFC history.

On April 4, 2026, Yakhyaev faced Brendson Ribeiro at UFC Fight Night 272. He won by rear-naked choke in the first round.

On June 27, 2026, Yakhyaev fought Julius Walker at UFC Fight Night 280 in Baku. He knocked Walker out with a right hook eight seconds into the first round. This fight earned him a $100,000 Performance of the Night award and was among the fastest knockouts in UFC history.

Yakhyaev faced Nikita Krylov on October 24, 2026 at UFC 333. He won the fight by technical knockout via a knee and punches in the first round.

== Championships and accomplishments ==
=== Mixed martial arts ===
- Ultimate Fighting Championship
  - Performance of the Night (One time) vs. Julius Walker
  - Fastest submission in modern UFC Light Heavyweight division history (0:33) (vs. Rafael Cerqueira)
  - Third fastest debut win in UFC Light Heavyweight division history (0:33) (vs. Rafael Cerqueira)
  - Third fastest knockout/finish in UFC Light Heavyweight division history (0:08) (vs. Julius Walker)
- Ares Fighting Championship
  - Ares Light Heavyweight Championship
- Khan Fight
  - Khan Fight Light Heavyweight Championship

== Mixed martial arts record ==
Professional record breakdown
11 matches	11 wins	0 losses
By knockout	5	0
By submission	5	0
By decision	1	0

Res.	Record	Opponent	Method	Event	Date	Round	Time	Location	Notes
Win	11–0	Nikita Krylov	TKO (knee and punches)	UFC 333	October 24, 2026	1	2:38	Abu Dhabi, United Arab Emirates	
Win	10–0	Julius Walker	KO (punches)	UFC Fight Night: Fiziev vs. Torres	June 27, 2026	1	0:08	Baku, Azerbaijan	Performance of the Night.
Win	9–0	Brendson Ribeiro	Submission (rear-naked choke)	UFC Fight Night: Moicano vs. Duncan	April 4, 2026	1	2:52	Las Vegas, Nevada, United States	
Win	8–0	Rafael Cerqueira	Submission (rear-naked choke)	UFC Fight Night: Tsarukyan vs. Hooker	November 22, 2025	1	0:33	Al Rayyan, Qatar	
Win	7–0	Alik Lorenz	TKO (knee to the body and punches)	Dana White's Contender Series 79	August 26, 2025	1	0:30	Las Vegas, Nevada, United States	
Win	6–0	Jacky Jeanne	Submission (rear-naked choke)	Ares FC 25	September 26, 2024	1	2:23	Paris, France	Defended the Ares FC Light Heavyweight Championship. Submission of the Night.
Win	5–0	Paulin Begai	Submission (guillotine choke)	Ares FC 23	July 11, 2024	1	1:32	Aubervilliers, France	Won the vacant Ares FC Light Heavyweight Championship. Submission of the Night.
Win	4–0	Nikolay Kovalenko	Decision (unanimous)	Khan Fight 2	January 7, 2023	5	5:00	Bursa, Turkey	Won the inaugural Khan Fight Light Heavyweight Championship.
Win	3–0	Mouhamadou Lamine	TKO (punches)	Khan Fight 1	October 15, 2022	1	0:24	Bursa, Turkey	Catchweight (220 lb) bout.
Win	2–0	Nazhmudin Yusupov	Submission (triangle choke)	ACA Young Eagles 27	June 25, 2022	2	3:09	Tolstoy-Yurt, Russia	
Win	1–0	Elbek Ravshanov	TKO (punches)	ACA Young Eagles 22	November 12, 2021	1	3:00	Tolstoy-Yurt, Russia	Light Heavyweight debut.

== See also ==
- List of current UFC fighters
- List of Dana White's Contender Series alumni
- List of male mixed martial artists
- List of undefeated mixed martial artists
