= Damian Pinas =

Surinamese-Aruban mixed martial artist (born 2002)

- Born: Damian Pinas Pasgal; March 12, 2002 (age 24); Paramaribo, Suriname
- Other names: The Baba Yaga
- Height: 6 ft 1 in (1.85 m)
- Weight: 185 lb (84 kg; 13 st 3 lb)
- Division: Middleweight
- Reach: 79 in (201 cm)
- Fighting out of: Oranjestad, Aruba
- Team: Nova União; Porrada Training Center; Stay Thai Fit
- Years active: 2022–present

Mixed martial arts record
- Total: 12
- Wins: 11
- By knockout: 10
- By submission: 1
- Losses: 1
- By disqualification: 1

Other information
- Mixed martial arts record from Sherdog

Damian Pinas Pasgal (born March 12, 2002) is a Surinamese-Aruban mixed martial artist. He currently competes in the Middleweight division of the Ultimate Fighting Championship (UFC).

== Background ==
Pinas was born in Paramaribo, Suriname. He grew up in the town of Moengo. At the age of 16, he moved with his family to Aruba. He started with boxing and Muay Thai at age of 19, because he wanted to make something of himself for a family that didn't have much.

== Mixed martial arts career ==
=== Early career ===
Pinas started his professional career in 2022, at the regional circuit and amassed an record at 7–1 with 100% finish rate and only one loss by disqualification, before his fight at Dana White's Contender Series in 2025.

=== Dana White's Contender Series ===
Pinas was invited to the season 9 of Dana White's Contender Series and was scheduled to face Murtaza Talha on August 12, 2025, at week 1 of the season. However, Pinas withdrew from the bout and was replaced by Baisangur Susurkaev.

Pinas competed at DWCS against Vitor Costa on September 30, 2025, at week 8 of the season. He won the fight via technical knockout in round one and was awarded a UFC contract.

=== Ultimate Fighting Championship ===
In his UFC debut, Pinas faced Wesley Schultz on February 28, 2026, at UFC Fight Night 268. He won the fight via technical knockout in round one.

Pinas faced César Almeida on July 11, 2026, at UFC 329. He won the fight via knockout in round one.

Pinas faced Andrey Pulyaev on October 3, 2026, at UFC 332. He won the fight via knockout in round one. This win earned him a $100,000 Performance of the Night award.

Replacing Ryan Gandra who replaced for undisclosed reasons, Pinas is scheduled to face Baisangur Susurkaev on December 12, 2026 at UFC 335.

== Championships and accomplishments ==
- Ultimate Fighting Championship
  - Performance of the Night (One time) vs. Andrey Pulyaev
- Victory Extreme Fighting Championship
  - VXFC Middleweight Championship (One time)

== Mixed martial arts record ==
Professional record breakdown
12 matches	11 wins	1 loss
By knockout	10	0
By submission	1	0
By disqualification	0	1

Res.	Record	Opponent	Method	Event	Date	Round	Time	Location	Notes
Win	11–1	Andrey Pulyaev	KO (punch)	UFC 332	October 3, 2026	1	1:15	Salt Lake City, Utah, United States	Performance of the Night.
Win	10–1	César Almeida	KO (punch)	UFC 329	July 11, 2026	1	4:44	Las Vegas, Nevada, United States	
Win	9–1	Wesley Schultz	TKO (punches)	UFC Fight Night: Moreno vs. Kavanagh	February 28, 2026	1	2:30	Mexico City, Mexico	
Win	8–1	Vitor Costa	TKO (punches)	Dana White's Contender Series 84	September 30, 2025	1	1:46	Las Vegas, Nevada, United States	
Win	7–1	Wesley da Silva Marques	KO (punch)	Shooto Brazil 127	December 13, 2024	1	1:59	Rio de Janeiro, Brazil	
Win	6–1	Jhony Gregory	TKO (punches)	Shooto Brazil 125	September 20, 2024	1	4:01	Rio de Janeiro, Brazil	
Win	5–1	Carlos Matos	KO (punches)	Victory Extreme FC 1	June 29, 2024	2	2:38	Oranjestad, Aruba	Won the inaugural VXFC Middleweight Championship.
Loss	4–1	Italo Gomes	DQ (illegal kick)	Shooto Brazil 121	March 29, 2024	1	2:44	Rio de Janeiro, Brazil	
Win	4–0	Leonardo Ruiz	KO (head kick)	Aruba FC: Never Back Down	November 28, 2023	1	0:16	Oranjestad, Aruba	
Win	3–0	Sebastian Villalobos Hernandez	Submission (brabo choke)	Madness FC 4	April 1, 2023	1	2:45	Oranjestad, Aruba	
Win	2–0	Julio Cesar	TKO (submission to punches)	Aruba FC 11	November 5, 2022	1	2:07	Oranjestad, Aruba	Middleweight debut.
Win	1–0	Jeandrick Croes	TKO (elbow and punches)	Caribbean FC 8	August 6, 2022	2	4:20	Oranjestad, Aruba	Catchweight (176 lb) bout.

== See also ==
- List of current UFC fighters
- List of male mixed martial artists
