= Dana White's Contender Series Brazil =

UFC mixed martial arts event in 2018

- Genre: Sports
- Created by: Dana White
- Country of origin: United States

Original release
- Network: Combate, Globo, SporTV
- Release: August 24 – September 7, 2018

Related
- Dana White's Contender Series Season 2; Dana White's Contender Series Season 3

In 2018 "Contender Series Brasil" debuted as a spin off Dana White's Contender Series. Unlike the U.S. version this was not shown live and instead was recorded over two days, August 10 and 11, 2018. The fifteen fights are then broadcast over three episodes on Combate, Globo and SporTV from August 24.

== Week 1 - August 24 ==
Dana White's Contender Series Brazil 1
- Promotion: DWCS
- Date: August 10, 2018 (pre-recorded)
- Venue: UFC Training Centre
- City: Las Vegas, Nevada, United States

Main Card
Weight class				Method	Round	Time	Notes
Flyweight	Rogério Bontorin	def.	Gustavo Gabriel	Submission (rear-naked choke)	2	4:37
Women's Bantamweight	Mayra Bueno Silva	def.	Mayana Kellem	Technical Submission (ninja choke)	1	1:02
Middleweight	Antônio Arroyo	def.	Diego Henrique	Decision (unanimous) (30–26, 30–26, 30–26)	3	5:00	(Note: Henrique was deducted 1 point in round 2 due to an illegal elbow.)
Women's Strawweight	Sarah Frota	def.	Maiara Amanajas dos Santos	KO (punches)	1	3:26
Heavyweight	Augusto Sakai	def.	Marcos Conrado	TKO (punches)	2	3:09

=== Contract awards ===
The following fighters were awarded contracts with the UFC:

- Rogério Bontorin, Mayra Bueno Silva, Sarah Frota, and Augusto Sakai

== Week 2 - August 31 ==
Dana White's Contender Series Brazil 2
- Promotion: DWCS
- Date: August 11, 2018 (pre-recorded)
- Venue: UFC Training Centre
- City: Las Vegas, Nevada, United States

Main Card
Weight class				Method	Round	Time	Notes
Women's Flyweight	Taila Santos	def.	Estefani Almeida	Decision (unanimous) (30–27, 30–27, 30–27)	3	5:00
Light Heavyweight	Johnny Walker	def.	Henrique da Silva	Decision (unanimous) (30–27, 30–27, 30–26)	3	5:00
Middleweight	André Muniz	def.	Bruno Assis	Decision (unanimous) (30–27, 30–27, 30–26)	3	5:00
Women's Strawweight	Marina Rodriguez	def.	Maria Oliveira	TKO (retirement)	1	3:03
Middleweight	Márcio Alexandre Jr.	def.	Leonardo Silva	Submission (guillotine choke)	1	1:52

=== Contract awards ===
The following fighters were awarded contracts with the UFC:

- Taila Santos, Johnny Walker, and Marina Rodriguez

== Week 3 - September 7 ==
Dana White's Contender Series Brazil 3
- Promotion: DWCS
- Date: August 11, 2018 (pre-recorded)
- Venue: UFC Training Centre
- City: Las Vegas, Nevada, United States

Main Card
Weight class				Method	Round	Time	Notes
Flyweight	Raulian Paiva	def.	Allan Nascimento	Decision (split) (29–28, 28–29, 29–28)	3	5:00
Light Heavyweight	Vinicius Moreira	def.	John Allan	Submission (triangle choke)	2	3:40
Women's Bantamweight	Luana Carolina	def.	Mabelly Lima	Decision (unanimous) (30–27, 30–27, 29–28)	3	5:00
Women's Bantamweight	Gisele Moreira	def.	Dayana Silva	Decision (split) (28–29, 29–28, 29–28)	3	5:00
Catchweight (160.5 lbs)	Thiago Moisés	def.	Gleidson Cutis	TKO (head kick and punches)	1	4:21	(Note: Originally a lightweight bout; Cutis missed weight.)

=== Contract awards ===
The following fighters were awarded contracts with the UFC:

- Raulian Paiva, Vinicius Moreira, Luana Carolina, and Thiago Moisés
