= Anthony Wint =

American football player and mixed martial artist (born 1995)

- Born: September 14, 1995 (age 31); Homestead, Florida, U.S.
- Other names: Bow Down
- Height: 5 ft 11 in (180 cm)
- Weight: 231 lb (105 kg; 16 st 7 lb)
- Division: Heavyweight (2023–present)
- Reach: 78 in (198 cm)
- Style: Folkstyle wrestling
- Fighting out of: Deer Creek, Florida, United States
- Team: Kill Cliff FC

Mixed martial arts record
- Total: 9
- Wins: 9
- By knockout: 6
- By submission: 2
- By decision: 1
- Losses: 0

Other information
- Occupation: Mixed martial artist, gridiron football player
- Mixed martial arts record from Sherdog

Anthony Wint
Profile
- Position: Linebacker

Personal information
- Born: September 14, 1995 (age 31); Homestead, Florida
- Listed height: 6 ft 0 in (1.83 m)
- Listed weight: 224 lb (102 kg)

Career information
- High school: Homestead (Homestead, Florida)
- College: FIU
- NFL draft: 2018: undrafted

Career history
- New York Jets (2018); Hamilton Tiger-Cats (2020)

Awards and highlights
- 3x Second-team All-C-USA (2015, 2016, 2017)

Career NFL statistics
- Total tackles: 1
- Sacks: 0
- Forced fumbles: 1
- Interceptions: 0
- Stats at Pro Football Reference

Anthony Wint (born September 14, 1995) is an American professional gridiron football linebacker and mixed martial artist. He currently competes in the Heavyweight division of the Ultimate Fighting Championship (UFC) and is a former FURY FC Heavyweight Champion. He also played college football at FIU. As of October 3, 2026, he is #15 in the Meta UFC heavyweight rankings.

== Early life ==
Wint was born and grew up in Homestead, Florida and attended Homestead High School, where he played football and wrestled. He was named second-team All-Dade County as a senior and sophomore and to the third-team as a junior. As a junior, Wint was named first-team All-Dade County in wrestling after posting 37–4 record and competed in the FHSAA state championship tournament. Wint committed to play college football at Florida International University over offers from Syracuse, Coastal Carolina, Western Kentucky and Monmouth.

== College career ==
Wint played four seasons for the FIU Panthers football team and earned a starting spot at linebacker during his freshman season. As a freshman, he was named to the Conference USA All-Freshman and honorable mention All-Conference USA and was named second-team All-Conference USA sophomore, junior and senior years. Over the course of his collegiate career Wint accumulated 336 tackles (second in FIU history), seven fumble recoveries, 1.5 sacks, one interception, five passes defensed and three forced fumbles.

== Professional career ==
Pre-draft measurables
Height	Weight	Arm length	Hand span	Wingspan	40-yard dash	10-yard split	20-yard split	20-yard shuttle	Three-cone drill	Vertical jump	Broad jump	Bench press
5 ft 11 in (1.80 m)	231 lb (105 kg)	31 5/8 in (0.80 m)	9 in (0.23 m)	6 ft 5 1/2 in (1.97 m)	4.82 s	1.62 s	2.72 s	4.41 s	7.32 s	35.0 in (0.89 m)	10 ft 1 in (3.07 m)	17 reps
All values from Pro Day

=== New York Jets ===
Wint was signed by the New York Jets as an undrafted free agent on May 7, 2018 after his performance in a rookie minicamp. He was cut by the Jets at the end of training camp and subsequently re-signed to the team's practice squad on September 2, 2018. Wint was promoted to the Jets' active roster on December 19, 2018 after tackle Brandon Shell was placed on injured reserve. Wint made his NFL debut on December 23, 2018 in a 44–38 loss to the Green Bay Packers, recording one tackle and forcing a fumble.

On August 31, 2019, Wint was waived by the Jets.

=== Hamilton Tiger-Cats ===
Wint was signed by the Hamilton Tiger-Cats of the Canadian Football League (CFL) on December 19, 2019. After the CFL canceled the 2020 season due to the COVID-19 pandemic, Wint chose to opt-out of his contract with the Tiger-Cats on August 31, 2020.

== Mixed martial arts career ==
=== Dana White's Contender Series ===
After six victories in regional mixed martial arts promotions, Wint faced Matt Adams in the main event of Dana White's Contender Series 87 on August 11, 2026. He won the fight by technical knockout 34 seconds into the first round, earning a contract with the Ultimate Fighting Championship.

=== Ultimate Fighting Championship ===
Wint made his promotional debut just eleven days later, facing newcomer Terrance Chatman on August 22, 2026 at UFC Fight Night 285. He won the fight via an arm-triangle submission in the first round.

For his second fight with the promotion, Wint made a quick return and faced Lucas Armand on October 3, 2026 at UFC 332. He won the fight by technical knockout 23 seconds into the first round.

== Mixed martial arts record ==
Professional record breakdown
9 matches	9 wins	0 losses
By knockout	6	0
By submission	2	0
By decision	1	0

Res.	Record	Opponent	Method	Event	Date	Round	Time	Location	Notes
Win	9–0	Lucas Armand	TKO (punches)	UFC 332	October 3, 2026	1	0:23	Salt Lake City, Utah, United States	
Win	8–0	Terrance Chatman	Technical Submission (arm-triangle choke)	UFC Fight Night: Hernandez vs. Rodrigues	August 22, 2026	1	4:29	Sacramento, California, United States	
Win	7–0	Matt Adams	TKO (punches)	Dana White's Contender Series 87	August 11, 2026	1	0:34	Las Vegas, Nevada, United States	
Win	6–0	Jamahl Tatum	TKO (punches)	Fury FC 117	March 15, 2026	1	0:37	Houston, Texas, United States	Won the vacant Fury FC Heavyweight Championship
Win	5–0	Miles Banks	KO (punches)	Fury FC: Challenger Series 15	November 21, 2025	1	0:31	Houston, Texas, United States	
Win	4–0	Emmanuel Verdier	TKO (punches)	Xtreme FC: Young Guns 9 & 10	June 25, 2025	3	4:02	Deerfield Beach, Florida, United States	
Win	3–0	Omar El-Sahlah	Decision (split)	Fury FC 103	March 23, 2025	3	5:00	Houston, Texas, United States	
Win	2–0	Jawaski Bethly	Submission (rear-naked choke)	Double Down FC 1	June 14, 2024	1	0:41	Miami, Florida, United States	
Win	1–0	Luis Alfonso Garcia Diaz	TKO (punches)	Titan FC 81	April 14, 2023	2	3:12	Santo Domingo, Dominican Republic	

== See also ==
- List of current UFC fighters
- List of Dana White's Contender Series alumni
- List of male mixed martial artists
