= Dana White's Contender Series season 6 =

UFC mixed martial arts event in 2022

Dana White's Contender Series
- Season 6

Release
- Original network: ESPN+
- Original release: July 26 – September 27, 2022

Season chronology
- ← Previous; Season 5 Next → Season 7

Season 6 of Dana White's Contender Series commenced in July 2022 and in the US is exclusive to ESPN+, ESPN's new over-the-top subscription package.

== Week 1 – July 26 ==
Dana White's Contender Series 47
- Promotion: DWCS
- Date: July 26, 2022
- Venue: UFC Apex
- City: Las Vegas, Nevada, United States

Main Card
| Weight class | | | | Method | Round | Time | Notes |
|---|---|---|---|---|---|---|---|
| Middleweight | Joe Pyfer | def. | Ozzy Diaz | TKO (punches) | 2 | 1:39 |
| Light Heavyweight | Anton Turkalj | def. | Acácio dos Santos | Decision (unanimous) (30–27, 30–27, 29–28) | 3 | 5:00 |
| Featherweight | Dennis Buzukja | def. | Kaleio Romero | Decision (unanimous) (29–28, 29–28, 29–28) | 3 | 5:00 |
| Flyweight | Alessandro Costa | def. | Andres Luna Martinetti | Decision (split) (30–27, 28–29, 29–28) | 3 | 5:00 |

=== Background ===
A bantamweight bout between Farid Basharat and Willian Souza was booked as the fifth fight on this card. However, Souza missed weight by ten pounds and the Nevada Athletic Commission cancelled the bout.

=== Contract awards ===
The following fighters were awarded contracts with the UFC:

- Joe Pyfer

== Week 2 – August 2 ==
Dana White's Contender Series 48
- Promotion: DWCS
- Date: August 2, 2022
- Venue: UFC Apex
- City: Las Vegas, Nevada, United States

Main Card
| Weight class | | | | Method | Round | Time | Notes |
|---|---|---|---|---|---|---|---|
| Lightweight | Chris Duncan | def. | Charlie Campbell | KO (punches) | 1 | 1:43 |
| Flyweight | Vinicius Salvador | def. | Shannon Ross | TKO (punches) | 2 | 4:22 |
| Featherweight | Francis Marshall | def. | Connor Matthews | Decision (unanimous) (30–27, 30–27, 30–26) | 3 | 5:00 |
| Heavyweight | Waldo Cortes-Acosta | def. | Danilo Suzart | TKO (punches) | 1 | 3:40 |
| Welterweight | Billy Goff | def. | Shimon Smotritsky | TKO (punches) | 1 | 3:37 |

=== Background ===
It was announced on May 16, 2022 that Season 5 week 6 contender Shimon Smotritsky would be granted a second chance to win a UFC contract, having defeated former UFC fighter William Macário in his first bout following the Contender Series loss. The fight was against CES MMA's current Middleweight & Welterweight champion Billy Goff.

=== Contract awards ===
The following fighters were awarded contracts with the UFC:

- Chris Duncan, Vinicius Salvador, Francis Marshall, Waldo Cortes-Acosta, and Billy Goff

== Week 3 – August 9 ==
Dana White's Contender Series 49
- Promotion: DWCS
- Date: August 9, 2022
- Venue: UFC Apex
- City: Las Vegas, Nevada, United States

Main Card
| Weight class | | | | Method | Round | Time | Notes |
|---|---|---|---|---|---|---|---|
| Middleweight | Bo Nickal | def. | Zachary Borrego | Submission (rear-naked choke) | 1 | 1:02 | (Note: Borrego missed weight (187.5 lbs)) |
| Heavyweight | Jamal Pogues | def. | Paulo Renato Jr. | Decision (unanimous) (30–27, 29–28, 29–28) | 3 | 5:00 |
| Featherweight | Erik Silva | def. | Anvar Boynazarov | TKO (elbows and punches) | 1 | 1:32 |
| Flyweight | Clayton Carpenter | def. | Édgar Cháirez | Decision (unanimous) (29–28, 29–28, 29–28) | 3 | 5:00 |
| Women's Strawweight | Karolina Wójcik | def. | Sandra Lavado | Decision (unanimous) (30–27, 30–27, 30–27) | 3 | 5:00 |

=== Contract awards ===
The following fighters were awarded contracts with the UFC:

- Jamal Pogues, Erik Silva, and Clayton Carpenter

== Week 4 – August 16 ==
Dana White's Contender Series 50
- Promotion: DWCS
- Date: August 16, 2022
- Venue: UFC Apex
- City: Las Vegas, Nevada, United States

Main Card
| Weight class | | | | Method | Round | Time | Notes |
|---|---|---|---|---|---|---|---|
| Lightweight | Esteban Ribovics | def. | Thomas Paull | KO (punches) | 1 | 1:30 |
| Middleweight | Claudio Ribeiro | def. | Iván Valenzuela | KO (punch) | 1 | 0:25 |
| Bantamweight | Jose Johnson | def. | Jack Cartwright | Decision (unanimous) (30–27, 29–28, 29–28) | 3 | 5:00 |
| Women's Bantamweight | Hailey Cowan | def. | Cláudia Leite | Decision (split) (29–28, 28–29, 29–28) | 3 | 5:00 |
| Lightweight | Nazim Sadykhov | def. | Ahmad Suhail Hassanzada | KO (punch) | 3 | 1:59 |

=== Contract awards ===
The following fighters were awarded contracts with the UFC:

- Esteban Ribovics, Claudio Ribeiro, Jose Johnson, Hailey Cowan, and Nazim Sadykhov

== Week 5 – August 23 ==
Dana White's Contender Series 51
- Promotion: DWCS
- Date: August 23, 2022
- Venue: UFC Apex
- City: Las Vegas, Nevada, United States

Main Card
| Weight class | | | | Method | Round | Time | Notes |
|---|---|---|---|---|---|---|---|
| Heavyweight | Mick Parkin | def. | Eduardo Neves | Submission (rear-naked choke) | 1 | 1:57 |
| Welterweight | Darrius Flowers | def. | Amiran Gogoladze | TKO (submission to slam) | 1 | 1:13 |
| Flyweight | Jesus Santos Aguilar | def. | Erisson Ferreira | Submission (guillotine choke) | 3 | 1:56 |
| Bantamweight | Cameron Saaiman | def. | Josh Wang-Kim | KO (punch) | 3 | 2:52 |
| Women's Strawweight | Denise Gomes | def. | Rayanne Amanda | Decision (unanimous) (30–27, 30–27, 30–27) | 3 | 5:00 |

=== Contract awards ===
The following fighters were awarded contracts with the UFC:

- Mick Parkin, Darrius Flowers, Jesus Santos Aguilar, Cameron Saaiman, and Denise Gomes

== Week 6 – August 30 ==
Dana White's Contender Series 52
- Promotion: DWCS
- Date: August 30, 2022
- Venue: UFC Apex
- City: Las Vegas, Nevada, United States

Main Card
| Weight class | | | | Method | Round | Time | Notes |
|---|---|---|---|---|---|---|---|
| Welterweight | Yusaku Kinoshita | def. | José Henrique | TKO (punches) | 3 | 0:43 |
| Middleweight | Sedriques Dumas | def. | Matěj Peňáz | Submission (guillotine choke) | 1 | 0:47 |
| Lightweight | Mateusz Rębecki | def. | Rodrigo Lídio | Submission (rear-naked choke) | 1 | 3:05 |
| Women's Strawweight | Viktoriya Dudakova | def. | Maria Silva | Decision (unanimous) (29–28, 29–28, 29–28) | 3 | 5:00 |
| Featherweight | Blake Bilder | def. | Alex Morgan | Submission (rear-naked choke) | 1 | 3:15 |

=== Contract awards ===
The following fighters were awarded contracts with the UFC:

- Yusaku Kinoshita, Sedriques Dumas, Mateusz Rębecki, Victoria Dudakova, and Blake Bilder

== Week 7 – September 6 ==
Dana White's Contender Series 53
- Promotion: DWCS
- Date: September 6, 2022
- Venue: UFC Apex
- City: Las Vegas, Nevada, United States

Main Card
| Weight class | | | | Method | Round | Time | Notes |
|---|---|---|---|---|---|---|---|
| Light Heavyweight | Vitor Petrino | def. | Rodolfo Bellato | KO (punches) | 2 | 3:36 |
| Welterweight | Gabriel Bonfim | def. | Trey Waters | Submission (Von Flue choke) | 1 | 4:13 |
| Heavyweight | Karl Williams | def. | Jimmy Lawson | Decision (unanimous) (30–27, 30–27, 30–27) | 3 | 5:00 |
| Lightweight | Ismael Bonfim | def. | Nariman Abbasov | Decision (unanimous) (30–27, 30–27, 29–28) | 3 | 5:00 |
| Women's Flyweight | Tereza Bledá | def. | Nayara Maia | Decision (unanimous) (30–26, 30–26, 30–26) | 3 | 5:00 |

=== Contract awards ===
The following fighters were awarded contracts with the UFC:

• Vitor Petrino, Gabriel Bonfim, Karl Williams, and Ismael Bonfim

== Week 8 – September 13 ==
Dana White's Contender Series 54
- Promotion: DWCS
- Date: September 13, 2022
- Venue: UFC Apex
- City: Las Vegas, Nevada, United States

Main Card
| Weight class | | | | Method | Round | Time | Notes |
|---|---|---|---|---|---|---|---|
| Bantamweight | Farid Basharat | def. | Allan Begosso | Decision (unanimous) (30–27, 30–26, 30–26) | 3 | 5:00 |
| Middleweight | Ikram Aliskerov | def. | Mário Sousa | Submission (kimura) | 1 | 2:09 |
| Lightweight | Trevor Peek | def. | Malik Lewis | TKO (punches) | 2 | 2:37 |
| Women's Strawweight | Bruna Brasil | def. | Marnic Mann | KO (head kick) | 2 | 4:33 |
| Bantamweight | Daniel Marcos | def. | Brandon Lewis | Decision (unanimous) (30–27, 30–27, 30–27) | 3 | 5:00 |

=== Contract awards ===
The following fighters were awarded contracts with the UFC:

- Farid Basharat, Ikram Aliskerov, Trevor Peek, Bruna Brasil, and Daniel Marcos

== Week 9 – September 20 ==
Dana White's Contender Series 55
- Promotion: DWCS
- Date: September 20, 2022
- Venue: UFC Apex
- City: Las Vegas, Nevada, United States

Main Card
| Weight class | | | | Method | Round | Time | Notes |
|---|---|---|---|---|---|---|---|
| Middleweight | Brunno Ferreira | def. | Leon Aliu | TKO (punches) | 1 | 1:35 |
| Bantamweight | Raul Rosas Jr. | def. | Mando Gutierrez | Decision (unanimous) (30–27, 30–27, 30–27) | 3 | 5:00 |
| Heavyweight | Austen Lane | def. | Richard Jacobi | TKO (punches) | 1 | 4:34 |
| Lightweight | Nurullo Aliev | def. | Josh Wick | TKO (punches) | 1 | 4:36 |
| Flyweight | Jafel Filho | def. | Roybert Echeverria | TKO (punches) | 3 | 1:31 |

=== Contract awards ===
The following fighters were awarded contracts with the UFC:

- Brunno Ferreira, Raul Rosas Jr., Austen Lane, Nurullo Aliev, and Jafel Filho

== Week 10 – September 27 ==
Dana White's Contender Series 56
- Promotion: DWCS
- Date: September 27, 2022
- Venue: UFC Apex
- City: Las Vegas, Nevada, United States

Main Card
| Weight class | | | | Method | Round | Time | Notes |
|---|---|---|---|---|---|---|---|
| Middleweight | Bo Nickal | def. | Donovan Beard | Submission (triangle choke) | 1 | 0:52 |
| Lightweight | Sam Patterson | def. | Vinicius Cenci | Submission (rear-naked choke) | 2 | 4:18 |
| Featherweight | Jack Jenkins | def. | Freddy Emiliano Linares | TKO (punches) | 3 | 4:30 |
| Flyweight | Rafael Ramos Estevam | def. | João Elias | TKO (punches) | 2 | 2:25 |
| Bantamweight | Mateus Mendonça | def. | Ashiek Ajim | KO (punches) | 1 | 0:48 |

=== Contract awards ===
The following fighters were awarded contracts with the UFC:

- Bo Nickal, Sam Patterson, Jack Jenkins, Rafael Ramos Estevam, and Mateus Mendonça
