= Dana White's Contender Series season 9 =

UFC mixed martial arts event in 2025

Dana White's Contender Series
- Season 9

Release
- Original network: ESPN+
- Original release: August 12 – October 14, 2025

Season chronology
- ← Previous; Season 8 Next → Season 10

Season 9 of Dana White's Contender Series commences in August 2025 and in the US is exclusive to ESPN+, part of ESPN's subscription package.

== Week 1 – August 12 ==
Dana White's Contender Series 77
- Promotion: Dana White's Contender Series
- Date: August 12, 2025
- Venue: UFC Apex
- City: Las Vegas, Nevada, United States

=== Background ===
Murtaza Talha was scheduled to face Damian Pinas in a middleweight bout at the event; however, Pinas withdrew from the bout and was replaced by Baysangur Susurkaev on four days' notice.

Fight card (ESPN+)
Weight class				Method	Round	Time	Notes
Middleweight	Ilian Bouafia	def.	Neemias Santana	Decision (unanimous) (30–26, 29–27, 29–27)	3	5:00	(Note: Santana was deducted one point in the round 1 due to an illegal headbutt.)
Welterweight	Ty Miller	def.	Jimmy Drago	Decision (unanimous) (30–27, 30–27, 30–27)	3	5:00
Middleweight	Baysangur Susurkaev	def.	Murtaza Talha	KO (front kick to the body)	1	3:04
Featherweight	Radley da Silva	def.	George Mangos	Decision (unanimous) (29–28, 29–28, 29–28)	3	5:00
Middleweight	Yuri Panferov	def.	Christopher Ewert	Decision (unanimous) (30–27, 30–27, 30–27)	3	5:00

=== Contract awards ===
The following fighters were awarded contracts with the UFC:

- Ty Miller and Baysangur Susurkaev

== Week 2 – August 19 ==
Dana White's Contender Series 78
- Promotion: Dana White's Contender Series
- Date: August 19, 2025
- Venue: UFC Apex
- City: Las Vegas, Nevada, United States

=== Background ===
At the weigh-ins, Louis Lee Scott weighed in at 136.5 pounds, 0.5 pounds over the bantamweight limit and he was fined a percentage of his purse, which went to Kaushik Saikumar.

Fight card (ESPN+)
Weight class				Method	Round	Time	Notes
Featherweight	José Mauro Delano	def.	Manuel Exposito	Decision (unanimous) (30–27, 30–27, 30–27)	3	5:00
Middleweight	Cameron Rowston	def.	Brandon Holmes	TKO (elbow and punches)	1	2:58
Bantamweight	Louis Lee Scott	def.	Kaushik Saikumar	TKO (punches)	3	2:20	(Note: Lee Scott missed weight (136.5 lb).)
Heavyweight	Josh Hokit	def.	Guilherme Uriel	TKO (elbows)	2	1:06
Featherweight	Ramiro Jimenez	def.	Tommy Cuozzi	TKO (elbows and punches)	1	2:53

=== Contract awards ===
The following fighters were awarded contracts with the UFC:

- Ramiro Jimenez, Josh Hokit, Louis Lee Scott, Cameron Rowston, and José Mauro Delano

== Week 3 – August 26 ==
Dana White's Contender Series 79
- Promotion: Dana White's Contender Series
- Date: August 26, 2025
- Venue: UFC Apex
- City: Las Vegas, Nevada, United States

=== Background ===
Brando Peričić and Elisha Ellison were scheduled to meet at this event in a heavyweight bout, but it was announced during DWCS week 2 event that the bout was moved to UFC Fight Night: Ulberg vs. Reyes instead.

Fight card (ESPN+)
Weight class				Method	Round	Time	Notes
Middleweight	Ryan Gandra	def.	Trent Miller	TKO (punches)	1	2:51
Featherweight	Márcio Barbosa	def.	Damon Wilson	TKO (punches)	1	4:14
Light Heavyweight	Abdul-Rakhman Yakhyaev	def.	Alik Lorenz	TKO (knee to the body and punches)	1	0:30
Lightweight	Manoel Sousa	def.	Cristian Pérez	TKO (punches)	3	3:00
Heavyweight	Donte Johnson	def.	Darion Abbey	TKO (punches)	1	1:04

=== Contract awards ===
The following fighters were awarded contracts with the UFC:

- Ryan Gandra, Marcio Barbosa, Abdul-Rakhman Yakhyaev, Manoel Sousa, and Donte Johnson

== Week 4 – September 2 ==
Dana White's Contender Series 80
- Promotion: Dana White's Contender Series
- Date: September 2, 2025
- Venue: UFC Apex
- City: Las Vegas, Nevada, United States

Fight card (ESPN+)
Weight class				Method	Round	Time	Notes
Welterweight	Jean-Paul Lebosnoyani	def.	Jack Congdon	KO (head kick and punch)	1	1:08
Middleweight	Cezary Oleksiejczuk	def.	Theo Haig	TKO (punches)	1	0:36
Lightweight	Mandel Nallo	def.	Samuel Silva	KO (punches)	1	3:29
Flyweight	Eduardo Henrique	def.	An Tuan Ho	Decision (unanimous) (30–27, 30–27, 30–27)	3	5:00
Featherweight	Tommy McMillen	def.	David Mgoyan	Decision (majority) (28–28, 29–28, 29–28)	3	5:00

=== Contract awards ===
The following fighters were awarded contracts with the UFC:

- Jean-Paul Lebosnoyani, Mandel Nallo, Cezary Oleksiejczuk, and Tommy McMillen

== Week 5 – September 9 ==
Dana White's Contender Series 81
- Promotion: Dana White's Contender Series
- Date: September 9, 2025
- Venue: UFC Apex
- City: Las Vegas, Nevada, United States

=== Background ===
Guilherme Pat and Anthony Guarascio were scheduled to meet in a heavyweight bout in the main event, but Pat withdrew from the bout for undisclosed reasons and was replaced by Steven Asplund.

Felipe Franco was originally scheduled to face Ivan Gnizditskiy and then Quentin Pasley, with both opponents eventually withdrawing from the contest and were replaced by Freddy Vidal. At the weigh-ins, Vidal weighed in at 210 pounds, 4 pounds over the light heavyweight limit and he was fined 25 percent of his purse, which went to Franco.

Fight card (ESPN+)
Weight class				Method	Round	Time	Notes
Heavyweight	Steven Asplund	def.	Anthony Guarascio	TKO (punch and elbows)	1	0:16
Featherweight	Lerryan Douglas	def.	Cam Teague	KO (punch)	1	0:36
Light Heavyweight	Freddy Vidal	def.	Felipe Franco	Submission (rear-naked choke)	3	4:48	(Note: Vidal missed weight (210 lb).)
Lightweight	Samuel Sanches	def.	Chasen Blair	KO (punches)	1	2:01
Women's Strawweight	Caroline Foro	def.	Shanelle Dyer	Decision (unanimous) (30–27, 29–28, 29–28)	3	5:00

=== Contract awards ===
The following fighters were awarded contracts with the UFC:

- Caroline Foro, Shanelle Dyer, Samuel Sanches, Lerryan Douglas and Stephen Asplund

== Week 6 – September 16 ==
Dana White's Contender Series 82
- Promotion: Dana White's Contender Series
- Date: September 16, 2025
- Venue: UFC Apex
- City: Las Vegas, Nevada, United States

Fight card (ESPN+)
Weight class				Method	Round	Time	Notes
Bantamweight	Hecher Sosa	def.	Mackson Lee	Decision (unanimous) (30–27, 30–27, 30–26)	3	5:00
Light Heavyweight	Iwo Baraniewski	def.	Mahamed Aly	KO (punches)	1	0:20
Lightweight	Thomas Gantt	def.	Adam Livingston	Submission (guillotine choke)	1	2:47	(Note: Livingston was deducted one point for repeatedly grabbing the fence.)
Middleweight	Paddy McCorry	def.	Hwang In-su	Decision (unanimous) (30–27, 30–27, 30–27)	3	5:00
Bantamweight	Cody Chovancek	def.	Raphael Uchegbu	TKO (punches)	3	0:10

=== Contract awards ===
The following fighters were awarded contracts with the UFC:

- Hecher Sosa, Iwo Baraniewski, Tommy Gantt, and Cody Chovancek

== Week 7 – September 23 ==
Dana White's Contender Series 83
- Promotion: Dana White's Contender Series
- Date: September 23, 2025
- Venue: UFC Apex
- City: Las Vegas, Nevada, United States

=== Background ===
Jeisla Chaves was scheduled to face the BSC Women's Bantamweight champion Regina Tarín in a Women's Flyweight bout; however, Tarin withdrew from the fight and was replaced by Sofia Montenegro.

Fighting Nerds prospect Icaro Brito was scheduled to Javier Reyes in a Featherweight bout; however, Brito's U.S. visa was denied and he was replaced by Justice Torres.

Fight card (ESPN+)
Weight class				Method	Round	Time	Notes
Middleweight	Mantas Kondratavičius	def.	Đani Barbir	TKO (punches)	1	1:06
Featherweight	Murtazali Magomedov	def.	Brahyan Zurcher	TKO (punches)	1	1:37
Women's Flyweight	Jeisla Chaves	def.	Sofia Montenegro	Decision (split) (28–29, 29–28, 29–28)	3	5:00
Featherweight	Javier Reyes	def.	Justice Torres	TKO (knees and punches)	1	2:32
Light Heavyweight	Rafael Tobias	def.	Jair de Oliveira	Submission (rear-naked choke)	1	3:46

=== Contract awards ===
The following fighters were awarded contracts with the UFC:

- Mantas Kondratavičius, Murtazali Magomedov, Jeisla Chaves, Sofia Montenegro, Javier Reyes and Rafael Tobias

== Week 8 – September 30 ==
Dana White's Contender Series 84
- Promotion: Dana White's Contender Series
- Date: September 30, 2025
- Venue: UFC Apex
- City: Las Vegas, Nevada, United States

Fight card (ESPN+)
Weight class				Method	Round	Time	Notes
Middleweight	Damian Pinas	def.	Vitor Costa	TKO (punches)	1	1:46
Bantamweight	Louis Jourdain	def.	Magno Dias	Submission (rear-naked choke)	3	0:39
Welterweight	Christopher Alvidrez	def.	Eliezer Kubanza	TKO (punches)	1	4:44
Featherweight	Kurtis Campbell	def.	Demba Seck	TKO (elbows and punches)	1	1:20
Flyweight	Rashid Vagabov	def.	Paulo Henrique da Silva	Decision (unanimous) (30–27, 30–27, 30–27)	3	5:00

=== Contract awards ===
The following fighters were awarded contracts with the UFC:

- Kurtis Campbell, Christopher Alvidrez, Louis Jourdain and Damian Pinas

== Week 9 – October 7 ==
Dana White's Contender Series 85
- Promotion: Dana White's Contender Series
- Date: October 7, 2025
- Venue: UFC Apex
- City: Las Vegas, Nevada, United States

Fight card (ESPN+)
Weight class				Method	Round	Time	Notes
Lightweight	Magomed Zaynukov	def.	Lucas Caldas	Decision (unanimous) (30–26, 30–26, 30–26)	3	5:00
Bantamweight	Adrián Luna Martinetti	def.	Mark Vologdin	Decision (unanimous) (29–28, 29–28, 29–28)	3	5:00
Flyweight	Imanol Rodríguez	def.	Roque Conceição Moreira Jr.	TKO (punches)	1	2:12
Middleweight	Luis Felipe Dias	def.	Donavon Hedrick	Submission (rear-naked choke)	2	4:37
Light Heavyweight	Luke Fernandez	def.	Rafael Pergentino	TKO (punches)	1	0:15

=== Contract awards ===
The following fighters were awarded contracts with the UFC:

- Magomed Zaynukov, Adrián Luna Martinetti, Mark Vologdin, Imanol Rodriguez, Luis Felipe Dias and Luke Fernandez

== Week 10 – October 14 ==
Dana White's Contender Series 86
- Promotion: Dana White's Contender Series
- Date: October 14, 2025
- Venue: UFC Apex
- City: Las Vegas, Nevada, United States

Fight card (ESPN+)
Weight class				Method	Round	Time	Notes
Light Heavyweight	Levi Rodrigues Jr.	vs.	Freddy Vidal	NC (overturned)	1	3:20	(Note: Originally a TKO (knees and punches) win for Rodrigues Jr.; overturned after he tested positive for nandrolone.)
Bantamweight	Juan Díaz	def.	Kwon Won-il	KO (spinning back elbow)	2	4:58
Featherweight	Marwan Rahiki	def.	Ananias Mulumba	TKO (elbows and punches)	2	2:13
Welterweight	Michael Oliveira	def.	Victor Valenzuela	TKO (punches)	2	3:56
Heavyweight	Jovan Leka	def.	Azamat Nuftillaev	Decision (unanimous) (29–28, 29–27, 29–27)	3	5:00
Middleweight	Wesley Schultz	def.	Mario Mingaj	Submission (hamstring stretch)	1	1:51

=== Contract awards ===
The following fighters were awarded contracts with the UFC:

- Levi Rodrigues, Juan Díaz, Marwan Rahiki, Michael Oliveira, and Wesley Schultz
