= Kwon Won-il =

Korean MMA fighter (born 1995)

- Born: 24 July 1995 (age 31); Daejeon, South Korea
- Other names: Pretty Boy
- Nationality: South Korean
- Height: 5 ft 10 in (1.78 m)
- Weight: 145 lb (66 kg; 10 st 5 lb)
- Division: Bantamweight; Featherweight; Lightweight
- Reach: 71 in (180 cm)
- Style: Taekwondo
- Fighting out of: Daejeon, South Korea
- Team: Extreme Combat; Top Gym BF
- Years active: 2014–present

Mixed martial arts record
- Total: 19
- Wins: 13
- By knockout: 11
- By submission: 1
- By decision: 1
- Losses: 6
- By knockout: 3
- By submission: 2
- By decision: 1

Other information
- Mixed martial arts record from Sherdog

Kwon Won-il (Korean: 권원일; born June 24, 1995) is a South Korean mixed martial artist who completed in the Bantamweight division. He previously competed for ONE Championship, where he challenged for the ONE Bantamweight World Championship.

== Background ==
Kwon was born on June 24, 1996, in Daejeon, South Korea. He started training martial arts when he joined his elementary school’s taekwondo team, progressing from participating in provincial competitions to the national youth tournament. He quit taekwondo when he graduated from elementary school, citing a lack of direction. Eventually, he was ordered to be transferred to another school after getting into fights with other students. After being informed of the news, his mother cried in front of the school's principal, and Kwon was motivated to better himself.

== Mixed martial arts career ==
=== Early career ===
Kwon started his professional MMA career in 2014, fighting primarily in South Korea and Japan. He amassed a record of 4–0 prior to his signing with ONE Championship.

=== ONE Championship ===
Kwon made his promotional debut against Anthony Engelen on January 19, 2019, at ONE: Eternal Glory. He won the fight via 67 second technical knockout in the first round.

Kwon faced Masakazu Imanari on February 22, 2019, at ONE: Call to Greatness. He lost the fight via a heel hook submission in 53 second from the first round.

Kwon faced former ONE Featherweight World Championship challenger Eric Kelly April 12, 2019, at ONE: Roots of Honor. He won the fight via 19 second technical knockout in the first round.

Kwon faced Koyomi Matsushima on June 15, 2019, at ONE: Legendary Quest. He lost the fight via unanimous decision.

Kwon faced Sunoto Peringkat on October 13, 2019, at ONE: Century – Part 1. He won the fight via technical knockout in the first round.

Kwon faced Shoko Sato on January 31, 2020, at ONE: Fire & Fury. He lost the fight via a rear-naked choke submission in the first round.

Kwon faced Bruno Pucci on October 30, 2020, and aired on November 20, 2022, at ONE: Inside the Matrix 4. He won the fight via technical knockout in the first round.

Kwon faced Chen Rui on January 20, 2021, and aired on January 27, 2021, at ONE: Unbreakable 2. He won the fight via technical knockout in the third round.

Kwon faced former ONE Bantamweight World Champion Kevin Belingon on December 3, 2021, and aired on December 17, 2021, at ONE: Winter Warriors II. He won the fight via knockout in the second round.

Kwon faced Fabrício Andrade on June 3, 2022, at ONE 158. He lost the fight via a body kick knockout in the first round.

Kwon was scheduled to face Mark Abelardo on November 19, 2022, at ONE on Prime Video 4. However, on November 4, it was announced that the bout was moved to ONE 163. He won the fight via technical knockout in the third round.

Kwon faced Artem Belakh on June 10, 2023, at ONE Fight Night 11. He won the fight via TKO in the second round.

Kwon faced Shinechagtga Zoltsetseg on January 14, 2023, at ONE Fight Night 18. He won the fight via technical knockout in the round two.

Kwon faced Fabrício Andrade in a rematch for the ONE Bantamweight World Championship on January 24, 2025, at ONE 170. He lost the fight via first round technical knockout.

On August 19, 2025, it was reported that Kwon was removed from ONE roster, despite as electing to waving its matching rights after his contract expired.

=== Dana White's Contender Series ===
Kwon faced Juan Díaz on October 14, 2025, at Dana White's Contender Series 86. He lost the match by KO in the second round.

== Titles and accomplishments ==
=== Professional ===
- ONE Championship
  - Performance of the Night (Two times) vs. Artem Belakh and Shinechagtga Zoltsetseg
  - Most finishes in ONE Bantamweight Division (9)

== Mixed martial arts record ==
Professional record breakdown
21 matches	14 wins	7 losses
By knockout	12	3
By submission	1	2
By decision	1	2

Res.	Record	Opponent	Method	Event	Date	Round	Time	Location	Notes
Loss	14–7	Apollo Gomes	Decision (unanimous)	Dana White's Contender Series 91	September 8, 2026	3	5:00	Las Vegas, Nevada, United States	
Loss	14–6	Juan Díaz	KO (spinning back elbow)	Dana White's Contender Series 86	October 14, 2025	2	4:58	Las Vegas, Nevada, United States	Return to Bantamweight.
Loss	14–5	Fabrício Andrade	TKO (punch to the body)	ONE 170	January 24, 2025	1	0:42	Bangkok, Thailand	For the ONE Bantamweight Championship (145 lb).
Win	14–4	Shinechagtga Zoltsetseg	TKO (elbows)	ONE Fight Night 18	January 13, 2024	2	2:40	Bangkok, Thailand	Performance of the Night.
Win	13–4	Artem Belakh	TKO (punches)	ONE Fight Night 11	June 10, 2023	2	3:57	Bangkok, Thailand	Performance of the Night.
Win	12–4	Mark Abelardo	TKO (knee and punches)	ONE 163	November 19, 2022	3	3:44	Kallang, Singapore	
Loss	11–4	Fabrício Andrade	KO (body kick)	ONE 158	June 3, 2022	1	1:02	Kallang, Singapore	
Win	11–3	Kevin Belingon	KO (punch to the body)	ONE: Winter Warriors II	December 17, 2021	2	0:52	Kallang, Singapore	
Win	10–3	Chen Rui	TKO (punches)	ONE: Unbreakable 2	January 29, 2021	3	0:31	Kallang, Singapore	
Win	9–3	Bruno Pucci	TKO (punches)	ONE: Inside the Matrix 4	November 20, 2020	1	2:00	Kallang, Singapore	
Loss	8–3	Shoko Sato	Submission (rear-naked choke)	ONE: Fire & Fury	January 31, 2020	1	4:05	Pasay, Philippines	Return to Featherweight.
Win	8–2	Sunoto Peringkat	TKO (punches)	ONE: Century – Part 1	October 13, 2019	1	1:43	Tokyo, Japan	Catchweight (150 lb) bout.
Loss	7–2	Koyomi Matsushima	Decision (unanimous)	ONE: Legendary Quest	June 15, 2019	3	5:00	Shanghai, China	
Win	7–1	Eric Kelly	TKO (punches)	ONE: Roots of Honor	April 12, 2019	1	0:19	Pasay, Philippines	
Loss	6–1	Masakazu Imanari	Submission (heel hook)	ONE: Call to Greatness	February 22, 2019	1	0:53	Kallang, Singapore	Featherweight bout.
Win	6–0	Anthony Engelen	TKO (punches)	ONE: Eternal Glory	January 19, 2019	1	1:07	Jakarta, Indonesia	Lightweight debut.
Win	5–0	Toshihiro Shimizu	Decision (split)	NeoFight 14	October 20, 2018	3	5:00	Cheongpyeong, South Korea	
Win	4–0	Arlan Faurillo	TKO (punches)	URCC Bets 7	September 14, 2018	1	N/A	Manila, Philippines	
Win	3–0	Kim Sung-hyun	Submission (rear-naked choke)	Top FC 8	August 15, 2015	1	4:10	Seoul, South Korea	Featherweight debut.
Win	2–0	Keisuke Iwata	TKO (punches)	Gladiator 82	March 29, 2015	1	1:46	Gifu, Japan	
Win	1–0	Hirotaka Miyakawa	TKO (punches)	DEEP: 66 Impact	April 29, 2014	1	0:36	Tokyo, Japan	Bantamweight debut.

== See also ==
- List of male mixed martial artists
