= Bilal Hasan =

American mixed martial artist

- Born: Bilal Alakai Hasan; July 16, 2001 (age 25); Honolulu, Hawaii, U.S.
- Other names: The IndoNinja
- Height: 5 ft 7 in (1.70 m)
- Weight: 125 lb (57 kg; 8 st 13 lb)
- Division: Flyweight
- Reach: 70 in (178 cm)
- Team: Charlie's Combat Club
- Years active: 2022–present

Mixed martial arts record
- Total: 12
- Wins: 10
- By knockout: 8
- By submission: 1
- By decision: 1
- Losses: 1
- By decision: 1
- No contests: 1

Other information
- Mixed martial arts record from Sherdog

Bilal Hasan (born July 16, 2001) is an American professional mixed martial artist. He currently competes in the flyweight division of the Ultimate Fighting Championship (UFC). A former CFFC Flyweight Champion, Hasan is nicknamed "The IndoNinja".

== Early life ==
Hasan was born in Hawaii to parents who immigrated from Indonesia. His family relocated to Washington state, where he was raised in Everett. He began training in taekwondo at five years old and competed in the Junior World Championships. Hasan graduated from the School of Nursing & Health Studies at University of Washington Bothell in 2023.

== Early career ==
Hasan made his professional mixed martial arts debut on December 16, 2022, at CFFC 116, defeating Xhelal Lleshi via split decision over three rounds. In July 2023, he faced Sonny Suranjin at COGA Combat Games 75, a bout that ended in a No Contest following an early accidental groin strike.

=== Cage Fury Fighting Championships ===
On February 1, 2025, at CFFC 139, Hasan challenged Brian Hauser for the vacant CFFC Flyweight Championship. He won the title via second-round knockout from a body punch.

Hasan made his first successful defense of the CFFC Flyweight Championship on June 6, 2025, at CFFC 143, defeating Jason Eastman via fourth-round technical knockout.

=== Dana White's Contender Series ===
On August 11, 2026, Hasan appeared on Dana White's Contender Series 67, facing Mridul Saikia. He won the fight via first-round knockout and was awarded a UFC contract.

=== Ultimate Fighting Championship ===
Hasan made his promotional debut against Nilson Rojas on August 29, 2026 at UFC Fight Night 286. He won the fight via second-round knockout. This fight earned him a $100,000 Performance of the Night award.

Hasan faced Luis Gurule on November 14, 2026, at UFC 334. He lost the fight via split decision.

== Championships and accomplishments ==
=== Mixed martial arts ===
- Ultimate Fighting Championship
  - Performance of the Night (One time) vs. Nilson Rojas
- Cage Fury Fighting Championships
  - CFFC Flyweight Championship (One time; former)
    - Three successful title defenses

== Mixed martial arts record ==
Professional record breakdown
12 matches	10 wins	1 loss
By knockout	8	0
By submission	1	0
By decision	1	1
By disqualification	0	0
Draws	0	
No contests	1	

Res.	Record	Opponent	Method	Event	Date	Round	Time	Location	Notes
Loss	10–1 (1)	Luis Gurule	Decision (split)	UFC 334	November 14, 2026	3	5:00	New York City, New York, United States	
Win	10–0 (1)	Nilson Rojas	KO (punch)	UFC Fight Night: Nurmagomedov vs. Song	August 29, 2026	2	2:28	Shanghai, China	Performance of the Night.
Win	9–0 (1)	Mridul Saikia	TKO (punches)	Dana White's Contender Series 67	August 11, 2026	1	1:42	Las Vegas, Nevada, United States	
Win	8–0 (1)	Renaldy Manse	TKO (punch to the body)	Cage Fury FC 149	December 20, 2025	1	2:15	Atlantic City, New Jersey, United States	Defended the Cage Fury FC Flyweight Championship.
Win	7–0 (1)	Jason Eastman	TKO (front kick to the body and punches)	Cage Fury FC 143	June 6, 2025	4	3:45	Philadelphia, Pennsylvania, United States	Defended the Cage Fury FC Flyweight Championship.
Win	6–0 (1)	Brian Hauser	KO (punch to the body)	Cage Fury FC 139	February 1, 2025	2	1:18	Philadelphia, Pennsylvania, United States	Defended the Cage Fury FC Flyweight Championship.
Win	5–0 (1)	Jose Leon	Submission (rear-naked choke)	Cage Fury FC 136	September 27, 2024	2	2:03	Philadelphia, Pennsylvania, United States	Won the vacant Cage Fury FC Flyweight Championship.
Win	4–0 (1)	Shamel Findley	KO (punches)	Cage Fury FC 132	June 14, 2024	1	1:55	Philadelphia, Pennsylvania, United States	
Win	3–0 (1)	Jacob Romano	KO (spinning wheel kick)	Cage Fury FC 129	February 9, 2024	2	2:10	Philadelphia, Pennsylvania, United States	
Win	2–0 (1)	Orlando Ortega	TKO (body kick and punches)	Cage Fury FC 123	September 1, 2023	1	1:44	Bensalem Township, Pennsylvania, United States	
NC	1–0 (1)	Sonny Suranjin	NC (accidental groin kick)	COGA Combat Games 75	July 29, 2023	1	0:07	Tulalip Bay, Washington, United States	Accidental groin strike rendered Suranjin unable to continue.
Win	1–0	Xhelal Lleshi	Decision (split)	Cage Fury FC 116	December 16, 2022	3	5:00	Atlantic City, New Jersey, United States	Flyweight debut.

== See also ==
- List of current UFC fighters
- List of male mixed martial artists
