= Dana White's Contender Series season 10 =

UFC mixed martial arts event in 2026

Dana White's Contender Series
- Season 10

Release
- Original network: Paramount+
- Original release: August 11 – October 13, 2026

Season chronology
- ← Previous; Season 9

Season 10 of Dana White's Contender Series commenced on August to October 2026. The season took place at 10 weekly episodes on Tuesday nights and aired exclusively on Paramount+.

== Week 1 – August 11 ==
Dana White's Contender Series 87
- Promotion: Dana White's Contender Series
- Date: August 11, 2026
- Venue: Meta Apex
- City: Las Vegas, Nevada, United States

=== Background ===
The season opener episode event was headlined by a heavyweight fight between Anthony Wint and Matt Adams.

=== Results ===
Fight card (Paramount+)
Weight class				Method	Round	Time	Notes
Heavyweight	Anthony Wint	def.	Matt Adams	TKO (punches)	1	0:34
Lightweight	Abe Alsaghir	def.	Fabrizio Escarrega	Decision (split) (27–30, 29–28, 29–28)	3	5:00
Flyweight	Bilal Hasan	def.	Mridul Saikia	TKO (punches)	1	0:45
Featherweight	Tom Pagliarulo	def.	Ananias Mulumba	TKO (punches)	3	4:24
Middleweight	Joseph Kropschot	def.	Jonathan Kunneman	Decision (unanimous) (30–27, 30–27, 29–28)	3	5:00

=== Contract awards ===
The following fighters were awarded contracts with the UFC:

- Anthony Wint, Bilal Hasan, Tom Pagliarulo and Joseph Kropschot

== Week 2 – August 18 ==
Dana White's Contender Series 88
- Promotion: Dana White's Contender Series
- Date: August 18, 2026
- Venue: Meta Apex
- City: Las Vegas, Nevada, United States

=== Background ===
The second episode's headliner featured a welterweight bout between Namo Fazil and former two-time Oktagon Welterweight Champion Kaik Brito, who previously fought at DWCS season 7 in 2023.

=== Results ===
Fight card (Paramount+)
Weight class				Method	Round	Time	Notes
Welterweight	Kaik Brito	def.	Namo Fazil	KO (punch)	3	0:12
Middleweight	Trent Miller	def.	Douglas Henrique Rodrigues	Technical Submission (Von Flue choke)	2	1:04
Lightweight	Cristian Pérez	def.	Logan Paxton	TKO (punches)	2	1:06
Light Heavyweight	Alik Lorenz	def.	Mahamed Aly	KO (punches)	1	2:23
Featherweight	Roman Puga	def.	Taner Trembley	Decision (unanimous) (29–28, 29–28, 29–28)	3	5:00

=== Contract awards ===
The following fighters were awarded contracts with the UFC:

- Kaik Brito, Trent Miller, Cristian Pérez, Alik Lorenz, Roman Puga, and Taner Trembley

== Week 3 – August 25 ==
Dana White's Contender Series 89
- Promotion: Dana White's Contender Series
- Date: August 25, 2026
- Venue: Meta Apex
- City: Las Vegas, Nevada, United States

=== Background ===
The main event of week 3 featured Bella Mir (who is a daughter of former UFC Heavyweight Champion Frank Mir) met Alex Apodaca in a women's bantamweight bout.

=== Results ===
Fight card (Paramount+)
Weight class				Method	Round	Time	Notes
Women's Bantamweight	Alex Apodaca	def.	Bella Mir	Decision (unanimous) (29–28, 29–28, 29–28)	3	5:00
Heavyweight	Guilherme Uriel	def.	Mario Piazzon	Submission (guillotine choke)	1	0:50
Welterweight	Sean Clancy Jr.	def.	Gary Balletto Jr.	TKO (elbows)	2	3:54
Welterweight	Ronald Humphrey	def.	Alexis Miranda	Submission (rear-naked choke)	1	4:03
Middleweight	Nick Galanti	def.	Carlos Petruzzella	KO (punches)	1	0:35

=== Contract awards ===
The following fighters were awarded contracts with the UFC:

- Alex Apodaca, Guilherme Uriel, Sean Clancy Jr., Ronald Humphrey and Nick Galanti

== Week 4 – September 1 ==
Dana White's Contender Series 90
- Promotion: Dana White's Contender Series
- Date: September 1, 2026
- Venue: Meta Apex
- City: Las Vegas, Nevada, United States

=== Background ===
Adam Darby and Patrick Rivera met in a welterweight bout in the main event of week 4.

=== Results ===
Fight card (Paramount+)
Weight class				Method	Round	Time	Notes
Welterweight	Adam Darby	def.	Patrick Rivera	TKO (doctor stoppage)	3	2:42
Middleweight	Modestino Rodrigues	def.	Brandon Holmes	TKO (punches)	1	0:15
Lightweight	Silvestre Sanchez	def.	Liam McCraken	KO (punch)	3	2:44
Heavyweight	Gabriel Lorenço	def.	Charlie Cleveland	KO (elbow and punches)	1	2:02
Lightweight	Adam Livingston	def.	Hunter Smith	Decision (split) (29–28, 28–29, 29–28)	3	5:00

=== Contract awards ===
The following fighters were awarded contracts with the UFC:

- Adam Darby, Modestino Rodrigues, Silvestre Sanchez, Gabriel Lorenço and Adam Livingston

== Week 5 – September 8 ==
Dana White's Contender Series 91
- Promotion: Dana White's Contender Series
- Date: September 8, 2026
- Venue: Meta Apex
- City: Las Vegas, Nevada, United States

=== Background ===
The event headliner of week 5 featured a light heavyweight fight between Arlind Berisha and Quentin Pasley.

A middleweight bout Martin Kozák and Juan Andres Cabrera was originally scheduled for this event, but Cabrera pulled out due to visa issues and was replaced by Christian Echols. At the weigh-ins, Echols weighed in at 189 pounds, three pounds over the middleweight limit. He was fined a percentage of his purse, which went to Kozák.

Undefeated prospect Frank da Silva Castro was scheduled to compete against Colton Loud in a flyweight bout, but Castro was forced to pull out due to visa issues and was replaced by fellow undefeated prospect Christian Natividad.

=== Results ===
Fight card (Paramount+)
Weight class				Method	Round	Time	Notes
Light Heavyweight	Quentin Pasley	def.	Arlind Berisha	KO (elbows)	1	4:41
Welterweight	Isaac Moreno	def.	Reginaldo Geraldo Jr.	Decision (unanimous) (29–28, 29–28, 29–28)	3	5:00
Middleweight	Martin Kozák	def.	Christian Echols	TKO (punches)	2	1:32	(Note: Echols missed weight (189 lb).)
Bantamweight	Apollo Gomes	def.	Kwon Won-il	Decision (unanimous) (29–28, 29–28, 29–28)	3	5:00
Flyweight	Christian Natividad	def.	Colton Loud	KO (punch to the body)	1	1:10

=== Contract awards ===
The following fighters were awarded contracts with the UFC:

- Quentin Pasley, Isaac Moreno, Martin Kozák and Christian Natividad

== Week 6 – September 15 ==
Dana White's Contender Series 92
- Promotion: Dana White's Contender Series
- Date: September 15, 2026
- Venue: Meta Apex
- City: Las Vegas, Nevada, United States

=== Background ===
A welterweight fight between Mayton Perea and undefeated prospect Zevan Hunt headlined at the week 6 of the season.

Undefeated prospect Akbar Abdullaev was originally scheduled to face Anthony Figueroa in a lightweight bout. However, Figueroa withdrew for undisclosed reasons and was replaced by Ednilson Santos.

=== Results ===
Fight card (Paramount+)
Weight class				Method	Round	Time	Notes
Welterweight	Mayton Perea	def.	Zevan Hunt	KO (punches)	1	0:45
Middleweight	Igor Cavalcanti	def.	Oscar Ravello	TKO (elbows and punches)	1	1:38
Lightweight	Akbar Abdullaev	def.	Ednilson Santos	KO (punch)	1	0:19
Middleweight	Luis Hernandez	def.	Hugo Guillon	Submission (rear-naked choke)	2	1:01
Featherweight	Tyshawn Williams	def.	Antônio Monteiro	Decision (unanimous) (29–28, 29–27, 29–27)	3	5:00

=== Contract awards ===
The following fighters were awarded contracts with the UFC:

- Mayton Perea, Igor Cavalcanti, Akbar Abdullaev and Luis Hernandez

== Week 7 – September 22 ==
Dana White's Contender Series 93
- Promotion: Dana White's Contender Series
- Date: September 22, 2026
- Venue: Meta Apex
- City: Las Vegas, Nevada, United States

=== Background ===
The main event of week 7 featured a middleweight bout between Bellator MMA veterans Norbert Növényi Jr. and Theo Haig, who is returning to the Contender Series after appearing in season 9.

=== Results ===
Fight card (Paramount+)
Weight class				Method	Round	Time	Notes
Middleweight	Norbert Növényi Jr.	def.	Theo Haig	Decision (unanimous) (29–28, 29–28, 29–28)	3	5:00
Welterweight	Alvi Dasuyev	def.	Jaden Ortega	Decision (unanimous) (30–27, 30–27, 29–28)	3	5:00
Flyweight	Marcos Degli	def.	Paris Moran	Submission (rear-naked choke)	2	4:46
Lightweight	Piero Guaylupo	def.	Callum Connor	Decision (unanimous) (30–27, 30–27, 30–27)	3	5:00
Light Heavyweight	Damian Piwowarczyk	def.	Emilio Quissua	TKO (punches)	1	4:55

=== Contract awards ===
The following fighters were awarded contracts with the UFC:

- Alvi Dasuyev, Jaden Ortega, Marcos Degli, Piero Guaylupo, Callum Connor and Damian Piwowarczyk

=== Records set ===
The lightweight bout between Piero Guaylupo and Callum Connor set numerous records and now stand as UFC/DWCS records:

- Most combined significant strikes landed in a UFC/DWCS lightweight bout, regardless of scheduled rounds (474)
- Most combined significant strikes landed in any three-round UFC/DWCS bout (474)
- Second most combined significant strikes landed in any UFC/DWCS bout (474) (behind Max Holloway vs. Calvin Kattar (578))
- Callum Connor landed the most significant strikes in DWCS history (265)

== Week 8 – September 29 ==
Dana White's Contender Series 94
- Promotion: Dana White's Contender Series
- Date: September 29, 2026
- Venue: Meta Apex
- City: Las Vegas, Nevada, United States

=== Background ===
The headliner of week 8 featured undefeated prospect George Staines and Loai Abushaar in a lightweight bout.

A featherweight bout between Ilias Bulaid and reigning LFA Featherweight Champion Erick Visconde was scheduled to take place at the event. Despite both successfully making weight, Bulaid was forced to withdraw before the event due to an illness and the bout has been postponed to week 10 of the season.

=== Results ===
Fight card (Paramount+)
Weight class				Method	Round	Time	Notes
Lightweight	George Staines	def.	Loai Abushaar	KO (slam and punches)	1	1:01
Heavyweight	Adama Diop	def.	Zaurbek Sabanov	TKO (punches)	2	2:13
Featherweight	Ian Escuza	def.	Luca Borando	TKO (knees and punches)	1	0:32
Women's Strawweight	Aieza Ramos Bertolso	def.	Camila Reynoso	Submission (brabo choke)	1	3:02

=== Contract awards ===
The following fighters were awarded contracts with the UFC:

- George Staines, Adama Diop, Ian Escuza and Aieza Ramos Bertolso

== Week 9 – October 6 ==
Dana White's Contender Series 95
- Promotion: Dana White's Contender Series
- Date: October 6, 2026
- Venue: Meta Apex
- City: Las Vegas, Nevada, United States

=== Background ===
A Light Heavyweight contest between Preston LaGrange and undefeated prospect Nell Ariano served as the headliner of week 9.

=== Results ===
Fight card (Paramount+)
Weight class				Method	Round	Time	Notes
Light Heavyweight	Preston LaGrange	def.	Nell Ariano	TKO (punches)	1	2:24
Welterweight	Salhahuddin Everett	def.	Ozzy Martin	KO (punch)	1	1:57
Flyweight	Roque Conceição Moreira Jr.	def.	Alexander Chavez	Submission (triangle choke)	1	3:37
Bantamweight	Matheus Soares	def.	Ryuho Miyaguchi	TKO (punches)	1	1:03
Women's Bantamweight	Alivia Bierley	def.	Summer Onley	Decision (unanimous) (30–27, 29–28, 29–28)	3	5:00

=== Contract awards ===
The following fighters were awarded contracts with the UFC:

- Preston LaGrange, Salhahuddin Everett, Roque Conceição Moreira Jr. and Matheus Soares

== Week 10 – October 13 ==
Dana White's Contender Series 96
- Promotion: Dana White's Contender Series
- Date: October 13, 2026
- Venue: Meta Apex
- City: Las Vegas, Nevada, United States

=== Background ===
The event headliner of final episode in the season featured a featherweight bout between Ilias Bulaid and the reigning LFA Featherweight Champion Erick Visconde.

Aline Pereira (who is younger sister of former one-time UFC Middleweight and two-time Light Heavyweight Champion Alex Pereira) competed for the contract against former ONE Women's Strawweight Muay Thai World Champion Smilla Sundell in a women's bantamweight bout.

=== Results ===
Fight card (Paramount+)
Weight class				Method	Round	Time	Notes
Featherweight	Erick Visconde	def.	Ilias Bulaid	Decision (unanimous) (30–27, 30–27, 30–27)	3	5:00
Women's Bantamweight	Smilla Sundell	def.	Aline Pereira	Decision (unanimous) (29–28, 29–28, 29–28)	3	5:00
Welterweight	Luis Francischinelli	def.	William Rentz	TKO (punches)	1	2:18
Middleweight	Douglas da Lapa	def.	Davi Cabral	TKO (punches)	3	0:19
Lightweight	Gregory Foster	def.	Jason Asher	Decision (unanimous) (29–28, 29–28, 29–28)	3	5:00

=== Contract awards ===
The following fighters were awarded contracts with the UFC:

- Smilla Sundell, Luis Francischinelli, Douglas da Lapa and Gregory Foster
