= UFC 331 =

Mixed martial arts event in 2026

UFC 331: Van vs. Pantoja 2
- The poster for UFC 331: Van vs. Pantoja 2
- Promotion: Ultimate Fighting Championship
- Date: September 19, 2026
- Venue: Crypto.com Arena
- City: Los Angeles, California, United States
- Attendance: 19,357
- Total gate: $8,228,105

Event chronology
UFC Fight Night: Silva vs. Delgado	UFC 331: Van vs. Pantoja 2	UFC Fight Night: Rosas Jr. vs. Barcelos

UFC 331: Van vs. Pantoja 2 (branded as Crypto.com UFC 331 for sponsorship reasons) was a mixed martial arts event produced by the Ultimate Fighting Championship that took place on September 19, 2026, at Crypto.com Arena in Los Angeles, California, United States.

== Background ==
The event marked the promotion's sixth visit to Los Angeles and first since UFC 227 in August 2018. Initial reports had speculated that the event may have been held at Intuit Dome in Inglewood, California, or be part of the promotion's Noche UFC 4 celebration of Mexican Independence Day in Glendale, Arizona.

A UFC Flyweight Championship rematch between current champion Joshua Van and former champion Alexandre Pantoja headlined the event. They previously competed in December 2025 at UFC 323, where Van won the belt via technical knockout 26 seconds into the first round as a result of an arm injury sustained by Pantoja.

A five-round lightweight bout between Arman Tsarukyan and Maurício Ruffy served as the co-main event. Tsarukyan was initially expected to face former UFC Lightweight Champion Charles Oliveira also in a five-round lightweight bout, with early reports indicating that Oliveira would defend his symbolic "BMF" (baddest motherfucker) title, but the bout was later changed to a non-title contest. Oliveira and Tsarukyan previously met in April 2024 at UFC 300, where Tsarukyan won via split decision. On August 5, the promotion announced that Tsarukyan would instead face Ruffy. The withdrawal came just days after the death of Oliveira's longtime teammate, UFC flyweight Allan Nascimento, although no official reason for Oliveira's withdrawal was given.

A UFC Women's Bantamweight Championship bout between the reigning champion Kayla Harrison (who is also a 2012 and 2016 Olympic gold medalist in judo; and a two-time PFL women's lightweight tournament champion) and former two-time champion Amanda Nunes, who also held the UFC Women's Featherweight Championship, was reportedly planned for the event. However, the bout is postponed for undisclosed reasons. The bout was originally scheduled for UFC 324 in January 2026. However, Harrison withdrew from the bout after being diagnosed with herniated discs in her neck, which required surgery.

A bantamweight bout between former UFC Bantamweight Championship challenger Marlon Vera and Charles Jourdain took place at the event. The bout was originally scheduled to take place at UFC Fight Night: du Plessis vs. Usman in July, but was moved to this event for undisclosed reasons.

A heavyweight bout between former interim UFC Heavyweight Championship challenger Curtis Blaydes and former LFA Heavyweight Champion Waldo Cortes-Acosta was scheduled for the event. However, the bout actually took place one week prior at UFC Fight Night: Silva vs. Delgado.

A lightweight rematch between former lightweight title challenger Renato Moicano and former UFC Featherweight Championship challenger Brian Ortega was scheduled for the main card. However, days before the event, Ortega had to withdraw due to an eye injury, so Moicano was re-scheduled to headline UFC Fight Night: Moicano vs. Nolan against Tom Nolan. The pair previously met in a featherweight bout at UFC 214 in July 2017, where Ortega won via third‑round guillotine choke. They were previously expected to rematch at UFC 326 in March, but Ortega withdrew due to injury and Moicano was later moved to headline UFC Fight Night: Moicano vs. Duncan one month afterward.

== Results ==
Main card (Paramount+)
Weight class				Method	Round	Time	Notes
Flyweight	Joshua Van (c)	def.	Alexandre Pantoja	Decision (unanimous) (49–46, 48–47, 50–45)	5	5:00	(Note: For the UFC Flyweight Championship.)
Lightweight	Arman Tsarukyan	def.	Maurício Ruffy	KO (elbow)	1	4:56
Featherweight	Patrício Pitbull	def.	Choi Doo-ho	TKO (punches and elbows)	1	3:28
Heavyweight	Sean Sharaf	def.	Gable Steveson	KO (punch)	1	0:12
Light Heavyweight	Alonzo Menifield	def.	Iwo Baraniewski	Decision (split) (29–28, 29–28, 28–29)	3	5:00
Preliminary card (Paramount+)
Bantamweight	Marlon Vera	def.	Charles Jourdain	TKO (submission to punch)	3	2:02
Heavyweight	Robelis Despaigne	def.	Tai Tuivasa	Decision (split) (29–28, 28–29, 29–28)	3	5:00
Featherweight	Michael Aswell Jr.	def.	Yoo Joo-sang	Decision (split) (29–28, 29–28, 28–29)	3	5:00
Middleweight	Ryan Gandra	def.	Osman Diaz	TKO (punches)	1	2:04
Early preliminary card (Paramount+)
Middleweight	Edmen Shahbazyan	def.	Brunno Ferreira	Decision (unanimous) (29–28, 29–28, 30–27)	3	5:00
Women's Flyweight	Casey O'Neill	def.	Eduarda Moura	Submission (armbar)	1	3:22
Featherweight	Joanderson Brito	def.	Giga Chikadze	KO (punches)	1	1:57

== Bonus awards ==
In addition to the standard $100,000 Fight of the Night and Performance of the Night bonuses, UFC CEO Dana White announced a one-time "Proper Chaos Bonus" of $50,000, tied to the season two premiere of the Paramount+ series MobLand, which aired the night before the event. The winner was determined at White's discretion.

The following fighters received $100,000 bonuses (during the post-fight press conference, White matched the "Proper Chaos Bonus" to $100,000). The other finishes received $25,000 additional bonuses.

- Fight of the Night: Joshua Van vs. Alexandre Pantoja
- Performance of the Night: Arman Tsarukyan and Casey O'Neill
- "Proper Chaos Bonus": Sean Sharaf

== Reported payout ==
The following is the reported payout to the fighters as reported by the California State Athletic Commission. The amounts do not include sponsor money, discretionary bonuses, viewership points, or additional earnings.

- Joshua Van: $500,000 (no win bonus) def. Alexandre Pantoja: $650,000
- Arman Tsarukyan: $350,000 (no win bonus) def. Maurício Ruffy: $110,000
- Patrício Pitbull: $400,000 (includes $200,000 win bonus) def. Choi Doo-ho: $85,000
- Sean Sharaf: $60,000 (includes $30,000 win bonus) def. Gable Steveson: $160,000
- Alonzo Menifield: $310,000 (includes $155,000 win bonus) def. Iwo Baraniewski: $50,000
- Marlon Vera: $400,000 (includes $200,000 win bonus) def. Charles Jourdain: $108,000
- Robelis Despaigne: $200,000 (includes $100,000 win bonus) def. Tai Tuivasa: $350,000
- Michael Aswell Jr.: $60,000 (includes $30,000 win bonus) def. Yoo Joo-sang: $12,000
- Ryan Gandra: $28,000 (includes $14,000 win bonus) def. Osman Diaz: $25,000
- Edmen Shahbazyan: $250,000 (includes $125,000 win bonus) def. Brunno Ferreira: $95,000
- Casey O'Neill: $132,000 (includes $66,000 win bonus) def. Eduarda Moura: $33,000
- Joanderson Brito: $158,000 (includes $79,000 win bonus) def. Giga Chikadze: $93,000

== See also ==
- 2026 in UFC
- List of current UFC fighters
- List of UFC events
