= UFC Fight Night: Silva vs. Delgado =

Mixed martial arts event in 2026

- The poster for UFC Fight Night: Silva vs. Delgado
- Promotion: Ultimate Fighting Championship
- Date: September 12, 2026
- Venue: Desert Diamond Arena
- City: Glendale, Arizona, United States
- Attendance: 16,928
- Total gate: $4,436,470

Event chronology
| UFC Fight Night: Hooker vs. Parnasse | UFC Fight Night: Silva vs. Delgado | UFC 331: Van vs. Pantoja 2 |

UFC Fight Night: Silva vs. Delgado (also known as UFC Fight Night 288 and Noche UFC 4) was a mixed martial arts event produced by the Ultimate Fighting Championship that took place on September 12, 2026, at the Desert Diamond Arena in Glendale, Arizona, United States.

== Background ==
The event marked the promotion's third visit to Glendale and first since UFC 263 in June 2021. It was also the fourth annual Noche UFC event commemorating Mexico's independence day, following UFC Fight Night: Lopes vs. Silva in September 2025.

A featherweight bout between former interim UFC Featherweight Champion Yair Rodríguez and Jean Silva was scheduled to headline the event. However, Rodríguez withdrew from the fight due to injury and was replaced by José Miguel Delgado.

A heavyweight bout between former interim UFC Heavyweight Championship challenger Curtis Blaydes and former LFA Heavyweight Champion Waldo Cortes-Acosta is scheduled for the event. They were previously incorrectly reported to be competing at UFC 331 one week later.

Former interim UFC Middleweight Championship challenger (also The Ultimate Fighter: Team Jones vs. Team Sonnen middleweight winner) Kelvin Gastelum and Yousri Belgaroui were expected to meet in a middleweight bout at the preliminary card. However, Gastelum pulled out on August 13 and was replaced by Djorden Santos.

A featherweight bout between promotional newcomer Ramiro Jimenez and Rodrigo Vera was scheduled at this event. However, Vera was removed from the event due to visa issues, so the bout was cancelled.

== Results ==
Fight card (Paramount+)
| Weight class | | | | Method | Round | Time | Notes |
|---|---|---|---|---|---|---|---|
| Featherweight | Jean Silva | def. | José Miguel Delgado | Submission (rear-naked choke) | 3 | 2:57 |
| Flyweight | Brandon Moreno | def. | Joseph Morales | Decision (split) (28–29, 30–27, 30–27) | 3 | 5:00 |
| Featherweight | Tommy McMillen | def. | Marwan Rahiki | Decision (unanimous) (29–28, 29–28, 29–27) | 3 | 5:00 |
| Women's Flyweight | Alexa Grasso | def. | Manon Fiorot | Decision (unanimous) (29–28, 29–28, 29–28) | 3 | 5:00 | (Note: UFC Women's Flyweight title eliminator.) |
| Heavyweight | Curtis Blaydes | def. | Waldo Cortes-Acosta | Decision (unanimous) (29–28, 29–28, 29–28) | 3 | 5:00 |
| Bantamweight | David Martínez | def. | Dan Ige | Decision (unanimous) (30–27, 30–27, 29–28) | 3 | 5:00 |
Preliminary card (Paramount+)
| Catchweight (130 lb) | Tim Elliott | def. | Édgar Cháirez | Decision (unanimous) (29–28, 29–28, 29–28) | 3 | 5:00 |
| Welterweight | Ignacio Bahamondes | def. | Muslim Salikhov | Decision (unanimous) (30–27, 30–27, 29–28) | 3 | 5:00 |
| Middleweight | Yousri Belgaroui | def. | Djorden Santos | TKO (punches) | 1 | 4:25 |
| Lightweight | Thomas Gantt | def. | Drakkar Klose | Submission (reverse triangle choke) | 3 | 2:46 |
| Lightweight | Rong Zhu | def. | Rafa García | Decision (unanimous) (29–28, 29–28, 29–28) | 3 | 5:00 |
| Featherweight | Sean King III | def. | Jessie Rosas | KO (slam and punches) | 1 | 0:36 |
| Women's Flyweight | Regina Tarín | def. | JJ Aldrich | Decision (unanimous) (29–28, 29–28, 29–28) | 3 | 5:00 |

== Bonus awards ==
The following fighters received $100,000 bonuses. The other finishes received $25,000 additional bonuses..

- Fight of the Night: Tommy McMillen vs. Marwan Rahiki
- Performance of the Night: Jean Silva and Sean King III

== See also ==
- 2026 in UFC
- List of current UFC fighters
- List of UFC events
- Noche UFC
