= Raul Rosas Jr. =

American-Mexican mixed martial artist (born 2004)

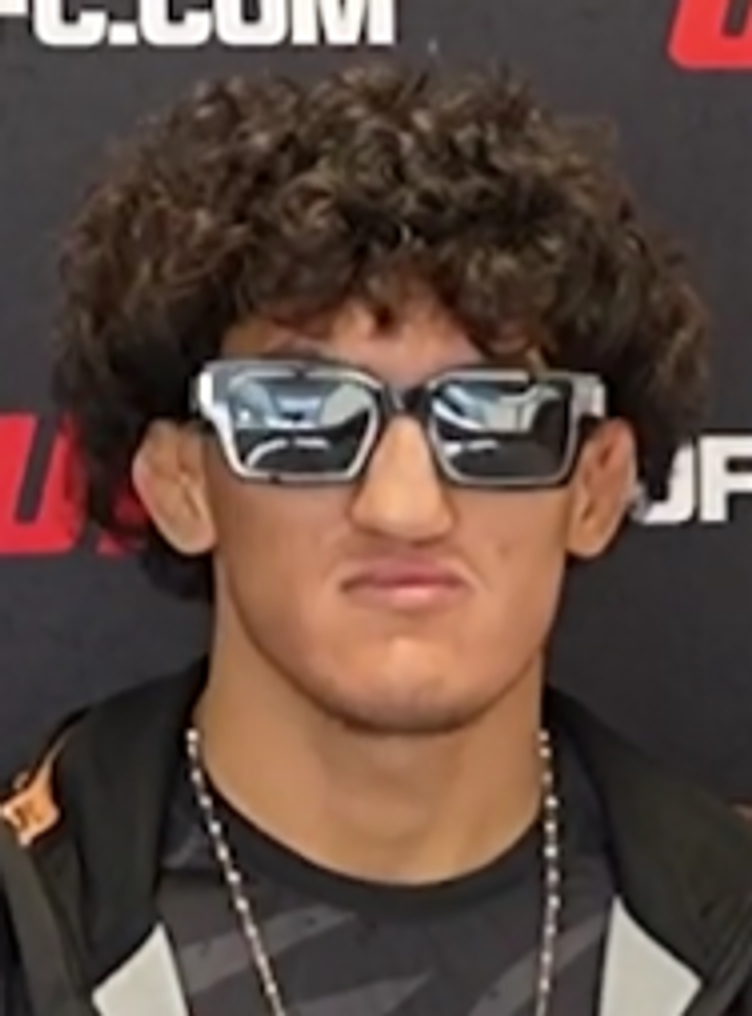
- Rosas Jr. in 2024
- Born: Raúl Gilberto Rosas Rios Jr. October 8, 2004 (age 22); Clovis, New Mexico, U.S.
- Other names: El Niño Problema (The Problem Child)
- Height: 5 ft 9 in (1.75 m)
- Weight: 135 lb (61 kg; 9 st 9 lb)
- Division: Bantamweight (2021–present); Featherweight (2021)
- Reach: 67 in (170 cm)
- Stance: Southpaw
- Fighting out of: Las Vegas, Nevada, U.S.
- Team: 10th Planet Jiu Jitsu
- Rank: 1st degree black belt in Brazilian jiu-jitsu
- Years active: 2021–present

Mixed martial arts record
- Total: 14
- Wins: 13
- By knockout: 3
- By submission: 6
- By decision: 4
- Losses: 1
- By decision: 1

Amateur record
- Total: 6
- Wins: 6
- By submission: 4
- By decision: 2

Other information
- Mixed martial arts record from Sherdog

Raúl Gilberto Rosas Rios Jr. (born October 8, 2004) is an American and Mexican mixed martial artist who currently competes in the Bantamweight division of the Ultimate Fighting Championship (UFC). Rosas Jr. was featured on Dana White's Contender Series, winning by decision and earning himself a UFC contract thus becoming the youngest person to be signed to the UFC in their history at 17 years, 11 months, 12 days old. As of September 26, 2026, he is #8 in the Meta UFC bantamweight rankings.

== Early life ==
Rosas Jr.'s parents initially immigrated to the United States from Iztapalapa, a district of Mexico City, Mexico. They settled in the city of Clovis, New Mexico, where Raul was born.

At 13 years old, the family moved to Santa Rosa, California. He began wrestling in high school and participated in pankration, an amateur sport similar to MMA. After a few years in Santa Rosa, Rosas Jr.'s parents made the decision to take their sons' wrestling career a step further. As an amateur, and at just 14 years old, he participated in the IMMAF world championships in Rome, where he was able to win gold.

== Mixed martial arts career ==
=== Early career ===
Rosas Jr. acquired a record of 5–0 competing exclusively in Tijuana, Mexico, for the Ultimate Warrior Challenge Mexico promotion winning all five fights by stoppage inside of two rounds.

=== Dana White's Contender Series Season ===
Rosas Jr. was then booked to compete on Week 9 of Season 6 of Dana White's Contender Series on September 20, 2022, against Mando Gutierrez. He would win the fight via a dominant unanimous decision and was awarded a contract by Dana White thus becoming the youngest fighter to sign a contract with the UFC at the age of 17.

=== Ultimate Fighting Championship ===
After earning his contract, Rosas Jr. made his UFC debut at UFC 282 against Jay Perrin on December 10, 2022. He won the fight via first round submission and this became the youngest person to ever win a UFC fight. This win earned him the Performance of the Night award.

Rosas Jr. faced Christian Rodriguez on April 8, 2023, at UFC 287. At the weigh-ins, Rodriguez weighed in at 137 pounds, one pound over the bantamweight non-title fight limit, so the bout proceeded at catchweight and Rodriguez was fined 20% of his purse which went to Rosas Jr. Rosas Jr. lost the fight via unanimous decision.

Rosas Jr. faced Terence Mitchell on September 16, 2023, at UFC Fight Night 227. He won the fight via technical knockout inside the first minute. This win earned him the Performance of the Night award.

Rosas Jr. was scheduled to face Ricky Turcios on February 24, 2024, at UFC Fight Night 237. However, Rosas Jr. was forced withdraw just before the bout was expected to begin due to an illness. As a result, the bout was initially pushed back one week to UFC Fight Night 238 on March 2, 2024. In turn, the bout was ultimately scrapped for unknown reasons. The fight would then be rescheduled to UFC on ESPN 57 on June 8, 2024. He won the fight via rear-naked choke in the second round. This win earned him the Performance of the Night award.

Rosas Jr. faced Aori Qileng on September 14, 2024, at UFC 306. He won the fight by unanimous decision.

Rosas Jr. faced Vince Morales on March 29, 2025, at UFC on ESPN 64. He won the fight by unanimous decision.

Rosas Jr. was scheduled to face Rob Font on September 13, 2025, at UFC Fight Night 259. However, Rosas Jr. had to withdraw due to an injury and was replaced by David Martínez. The rescheduled bout took place on March 7, 2026, at UFC 326. Rosas Jr. won the fight by unanimous decision.

Rosas Jr. faced Raoni Barcelos in the main event on September 26, 2026, at UFC Fight Night 289, becoming the youngest fighter to headline a UFC Fight Night card. Rosas Jr. won the fight after Barcelos went unconscious as a result of Rosas Jr.'s takedown during the fifth round. This win earned him the Fight of the Night award.

== Submission grappling career ==
Rosas Jr. faced the former two-time UFC Flyweight Champion Deiveson Figueiredo in a submission grappling match at Hype FC Brazil: São Paulo on April 8, 2026. The bout ended in a draw.

Rosas Jr. faced Colby Covington at Hype Italy on November 3, 2026, in a submission-only grappling match, winning with a rear-naked choke submission in 43 seconds.

== Freestyle wrestling ==
Rosas Jr. was scheduled to make his Real American Freestyle debut against Clay Guida on November 28, 2026, at RAF 15. However, the bout was cancelled for undisclosed reasons and Guida was matched with a different opponent.

== Personal life ==
Raúl has an older brother, Jessie, who is also a mixed martial artist competing in the UFC.

== Championships and accomplishments ==
=== Mixed martial arts ===
- Ultimate Fighting Championship
  - Fight of the Night (One time) vs. Raoni Barcelos
  - Performance of the Night (Three times) vs. Jay Perrin, Terence Mitchell and Ricky Turcios
  - Youngest fighter to sign a UFC contract (17 years, 11 months)
    - Youngest fighter to win a UFC bout (18 years, 2 months)
    - Youngest fighter to win five UFC bouts (20 years, 5 months)
    - Youngest fighter to headline a UFC Fight Night card (21 years, 11 months)
  - Third highest control time percentage in UFC Bantamweight division history (37.6%)
  - Fourth highest top position percentage in UFC Bantamweight division history (47.7%)
  - Tied (Tony Gravely) for fifth most takedowns landed in UFC Bantamweight division history (33)
  - Second most takedowns landed in a UFC Bantamweight bout (16) (vs. Rob Font)
    - Tied (Sean Sherk) for fourth most takedowns landed in a bout (16) (vs. Rob Font)
    - Third most takedowns landed in a three-round bout (16) (vs. Rob Font)
  - Highest takedown accuracy percentage in a UFC Bantamweight bout (88.9%) (vs. Rob Font)
  - UFC.com Awards
    - 2022: Ranked #9 Newcomer of the Year
- MMA Junkie
  - 2022 Newcomer of the Year
- MMA Fighting
  - 2022 Third Team MMA All-Star

== Mixed martial arts record ==
Professional record breakdown
14 matches	13 wins	1 loss
By knockout	3	0
By submission	6	0
By decision	4	1

Res.	Record	Opponent	Method	Event	Date	Round	Time	Location	Notes
Win	13–1	Raoni Barcelos	KO (slam)	UFC Fight Night: Rosas Jr. vs. Barcelos	September 26, 2026	5	1:38	Las Vegas, Nevada, United States	Fight of the Night.
Win	12–1	Rob Font	Decision (unanimous)	UFC 326	March 7, 2026	3	5:00	Las Vegas, Nevada, United States	
Win	11–1	Vince Morales	Decision (unanimous)	UFC on ESPN: Moreno vs. Erceg	March 29, 2025	3	5:00	Mexico City, Mexico	
Win	10–1	Aori Qileng	Decision (unanimous)	UFC 306	September 14, 2024	3	5:00	Las Vegas, Nevada, United States	
Win	9–1	Ricky Turcios	Submission (rear-naked choke)	UFC on ESPN: Cannonier vs. Imavov	June 8, 2024	2	2:22	Louisville, Kentucky, United States	Performance of the Night.
Win	8–1	Terrence Mitchell	TKO (punches)	UFC Fight Night: Grasso vs. Shevchenko 2	September 16, 2023	1	0:54	Las Vegas, Nevada, United States	Performance of the Night.
Loss	7–1	Christian Rodriguez	Decision (unanimous)	UFC 287	April 8, 2023	3	5:00	Miami, Florida, United States	Catchweight (137.5 lb) bout; Rodriguez missed weight.
Win	7–0	Jay Perrin	Submission (face crank)	UFC 282	December 10, 2022	1	2:44	Las Vegas, Nevada, United States	Performance of the Night.
Win	6–0	Mando Gutierrez	Decision (unanimous)	Dana White's Contender Series 55	September 20, 2022	3	5:00	Las Vegas, Nevada, United States	
Win	5–0	Andres Portocarrero	TKO (punches)	UWC Mexico 35	June 24, 2022	1	2:11	Tijuana, Mexico	
Win	4–0	Jose Guadalupe Peñaloza	Submission (rear-naked choke)	UWC Mexico 34	May 27, 2022	2	2:25	Tijuana, Mexico	Bantamweight debut.
Win	3–0	Francisco Villanueva	Submission (armbar)	UWC Mexico 33	April 29, 2022	1	2:07	Tijuana, Mexico	
Win	2–0	Joel Peña	Submission (armbar)	UWC Mexico 32	March 25, 2022	1	0:54	Tijuana, Mexico	
Win	1–0	Eduardo Velázquez	Submission (rear-naked choke)	UWC Mexico 30	November 26, 2021	1	1:01	Tijuana, Mexico	Featherweight debut.

=== Amateur mixed martial arts record ===
Amateur record breakdown		
6 matches	6 wins	0 losses
By submission	4	0
By decision	2	0

Res.	Record	Opponent	Method	Event	Date	Round	Time	Location	Notes
Win	6–0	Donaldo Duran	Submission (armbar)	UWC Mexico 26	April 30, 2021	1	1:07	Tijuana, Baja California, Mexico	
Win	5–0	Luke Pham	Submission (choke)	Bear River FC 12	January 25, 2020	1	2:11	Loleta, California, United States	
Win	4–0	Alex Williams	Decision (unanimous)	2019 IMMAF Youth World Championships	August 4, 2019	1	4:00	Ostia, Rome, Italy	Won gold medal.
Win	3–0	Jack Grundy	Submission (armbar)	2019 IMMAF Youth World Championships	August 4, 2019	1	0:44	Ostia, Rome, Italy	Semifinal.
Win	2–0	Stanislav Abramov	Decision (unanimous)	2019 IMMAF Youth World Championships	August 4, 2019	1	4:00	Ostia, Rome, Italy	
Win	1–0	Lucas Afif	Submission (rear-naked choke)	2019 IMMAF Youth World Championships	August 4, 2019	1	2:15	Ostia, Rome, Italy	Bantamweight debut.

== See also ==
- List of current UFC fighters
- List of Dana White's Contender Series alumni
- List of male mixed martial artists
- List of Mexican UFC fighters
