= Adam Fugitt =

American mixed martial artist

- Born: Adam Michael Fugitt; January 6, 1989 (age 37); United States
- Weight: 170 lb (77 kg)
- Division: Welterweight
- Reach: 77 in (196 cm)
- Fighting out of: Eugene, Oregon, United States
- Team: Art of War MMA
- Years active: 2016–present

Mixed martial arts record
- Total: 13
- Wins: 9
- By knockout: 4
- By submission: 3
- By decision: 2
- Losses: 4
- By knockout: 2
- By decision: 2

Other information
- Occupation: Mixed martial artist
- Mixed martial arts record from Sherdog

Adam Michael Fugitt (born January 6, 1989) is an American professional mixed martial artist who competes in the Welterweight division of the Ultimate Fighting Championship (UFC).

== Early life and background ==
Fugitt was born on January 6, 1989, in Eugene, Oregon, United States, to Nathan Fugitt and Melissa. His father was a warehouse manager, and his mother, Melissa, worked at a local credit union.

As a teenager, Fugitt worked in plumbing and at a truck shop at 16 years old in West Eugene before later spending nearly a decade at Rosboro LLC, where he rose from machine operator to supervisor. He competed in wrestling during high school and during his college years, first at Southwestern Oregon Community College in Coos Bay, then started his Brazilian jiu-jitsu training at age 20, followed by Muay Thai, leading to MMA.

== Mixed martial arts career ==
Fugitt started his professional MMA career in 2016, competing in regional promotions across the Pacific Northwest.

Fugitt made his UFC debut in 2022 against Michael Morales. He lost the bout via technical knockout in the third round.

In his second UFC appearance, Fugitt faced Yusaku Kinoshita at UFC Fight Night 218 on February 4, 2023. He won the bout by TKO (elbows) in the first round, earning the first victory of his UFC career. On June 10, 2023, Fugitt fought Mike Malott at UFC 289 and lost by submission in the second round.

Fugitt faced Josh Quinlan on February 17, 2024, at UFC 298 and won the bout by technical knockout in the first round.

Fugitt was re-scheduled to face Islam Dulatov on July 26, 2025, at UFC 318. He lost the fight via technical knockout in the opening round.

== Mixed martial arts record ==
Professional record breakdown
16 matches	10 wins	6 losses
By knockout	5	4
By submission	3	1
By decision	2	1

Res.	Record	Opponent	Method	Event	Date	Round	Time	Location	Notes
Loss	10–6	Ty Miller	TKO (knee and punches)	UFC 324	January 24, 2026	1	4:59	Las Vegas, Nevada, United States	
Loss	10–5	Islam Dulatov	KO (punches)	UFC 318	July 19, 2025	1	4:06	New Orleans, Louisiana, United States	
Win	10–4	Josh Quinlan	Decision (split)	UFC on ESPN: Perez vs. Taira	June 15, 2024	3	5:00	Las Vegas, Nevada, United States	
Loss	9–4	Mike Malott	Submission (guillotine choke)	UFC 289	June 10, 2023	2	1:06	Vancouver, British Columbia, Canada	
Win	9–3	Yusaku Kinoshita	TKO (elbows)	UFC Fight Night: Lewis vs. Spivac	February 4, 2023	1	4:36	Las Vegas, Nevada, United States	
Loss	8–3	Michael Morales	TKO (punches)	UFC 277	July 30, 2023	3	1:09	Dallas, Texas, United States	
Win	8–2	Solomon Renfro	TKO (punches)	LFA 125	February 25, 2022	1	0:43	Niagara Falls, New York, United States	
Win	7–2	Devon Brock	TKO (elbows)	PureCombat: Battle For The Brave	November 16, 2019	2	1:44	Salem, Oregon, United States	Catchweight (175 lb) bout.
Win	6–2	Reno Remigio	Submission (rear-naked choke)	X-1 World Events 54	April 27, 2019	3	1:30	Honolulu, Hawaii, United States	Won the vacant X-1 Welterweight Championship.
Win	5–2	Johnavan Vistante	Submission (kimura)	X-1 World Events 51	January 19, 2019	2	2:23	Honolulu, Hawaii, United States	Return to Welterweight.
Loss	4–2	Kailan Hill	KO (punch)	LFA 51	September 28, 2018	1	1:31	Fresno, California, United States	Middleweight debut.
Win	4–1	Travis LeBrun	Submission (rear-naked choke)	CageSport 51	May 5, 2018	2	2:33	Canyonville, Oregon, United States	
Win	3–1	T.J. Koehler	TKO (punches)	Prime Fighting 10	September 30, 2017	1	1:51	Ridgefield, Washington, United States	Won the vacant Prime Fighting Welterweight Championship.
Loss	2–1	Austin Vanderford	Decision (unanimous)	Arena Wars: Total Kombat	July 8, 2017	3	5:00	Medford, Oregon, United States	
Win	2–0	Hamza Salim	Decision (unanimous)	Prime Fighting 9	March 11, 2017	3	5:00	Ridgefield, Washington, United States	
Win	1–0	Amin Kajtaz	TKO (punches)	Prime Fighting 8	October 8, 2016	2	3:57	Ridgefield, Washington, United States	Welterweight debut.

== See also ==
- List of current UFC fighters
- List of male mixed martial artists
