= UFC Fight Night: Vettori vs. Dolidze 2 =

Mixed martial arts event in 2025

- The poster for UFC Fight Night: Vettori vs. Dolidze 2
- Promotion: Ultimate Fighting Championship
- Date: March 15, 2025
- Venue: UFC Apex
- City: Enterprise, Nevada, United States
- Attendance: Not announced

Event chronology
UFC 313: Pereira vs. Ankalaev	UFC Fight Night: Vettori vs. Dolidze 2	UFC Fight Night: Edwards vs. Brady

UFC Fight Night: Vettori vs. Dolidze 2 (also known as UFC Fight Night 254 and UFC Vegas 104 and UFC on ESPN+ 112) was a mixed martial arts event produced by the Ultimate Fighting Championship that took place on March 15, 2025, at the UFC Apex in Enterprise, Nevada, part of the Las Vegas Valley, United States.

== Background ==
A middleweight rematch between former UFC Middleweight Championship challenger Marvin Vettori and Roman Dolidze headlined the event. The pairing previously met at UFC 286 in March 2023, with Vettori winning the fight via unanimous decision.

A lightweight bout between Evan Elder and MarQuel Mederos was scheduled for this event. However, it was announced that Mederos was injured, so the bout was cancelled and Elder was moved to the UFC on ESPN: Hill vs. Rountree Jr. card. It was also reported that Mederos was moved to the UFC on ESPN: Moreno vs. Erceg two weeks later as a replacement fighter.

At the weigh-ins, two fighters missed weight:

- Undefeated promotional newcomer Diyar Nurgozhay weighed in at 210.5 pounds, four and a half pounds over the light heavyweight non-title fight limit.
- Chidi Njokuani weighed in at 172.25 pounds, one and a quarter pounds over the welterweight non-title fight limit.

Nurgozhay and Njokuani's bouts proceeded at catchweight. Nurgozhay was fined 25 percent of his individual purse which went to his opponent Brendson Ribeiro and 20 percent of Njokuani's purse went to his opponent Elizeu Zaleski dos Santos.

== Results ==
Main card (ESPN+)
Weight class				Method	Round	Time	Notes
Middleweight	Roman Dolidze	def.	Marvin Vettori	Decision (unanimous) (49–46, 49–46, 49–46)	5	5:00
Catchweight (172.25 lb)	Chidi Njokuani	def.	Elizeu Zaleski dos Santos	TKO (knee and elbows)	2	2:19
Lightweight	Alexander Hernandez	def.	Kurt Holobaugh	Decision (unanimous) (29–28, 30–27, 29–28)	3	5:00
Bantamweight	Da'Mon Blackshear	def.	Cody Gibson	Submission (kimura)	2	4:09
Catchweight (210.5 lb)	Brendson Ribeiro	def.	Diyar Nurgozhay	Submission (kimura)	2	1:28
Featherweight	Kevin Vallejos	def.	Choi Seung-woo	TKO (punches)	1	3:09
Preliminary card (ESPN+)
Heavyweight	Waldo Cortes-Acosta	def.	Ryan Spann	KO (punches)	2	4:48
Bantamweight	You Su-young	def.	AJ Cunningham	Decision (unanimous) (30–27, 30–27, 30–27)	3	5:00
Bantamweight	Carlos Vera	def.	Josias Musasa	Submission (rear-naked choke)	1	3:16
Women's Strawweight	Sam Hughes	def.	Stephanie Luciano	Decision (split) (29–28, 28–29, 29–27)	3	5:00
Flyweight	André Lima	def.	Daniel Barez	Submission (rear-naked choke)	3	3:05
Women's Bantamweight	Priscila Cachoeira	def.	Josiane Nunes	KO (punch)	1	2:46
Women's Flyweight	Carli Judice	def.	Yuneisy Duben	TKO (head kick and punches)	1	1:40

== Bonus awards ==
The following fighters received $50,000 bonuses.

- Fight of the Night: No bonus awarded.
- Performance of the Night: Carlos Vera, André Lima, Priscila Cachoeira, and Carli Judice

== See also ==
- 2025 in UFC
- List of current UFC fighters
- List of UFC events
