= Alexander Hernandez =

American mixed martial arts fighter

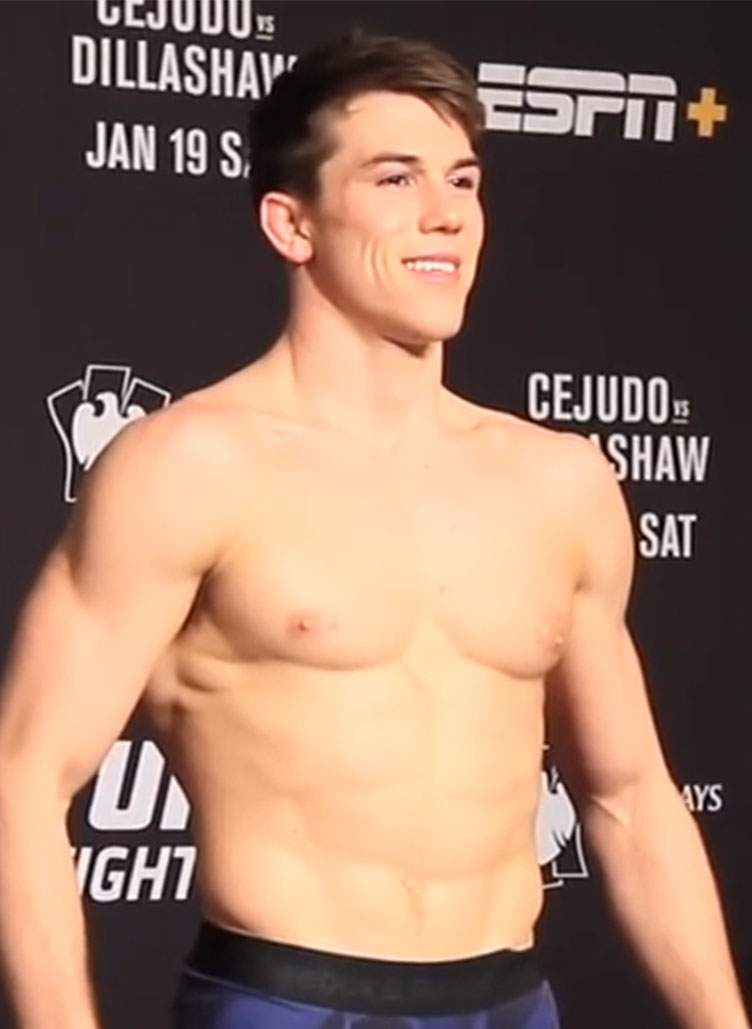
- Alexander Hernandez Jan 19, 2019
- Born: Alexander Xavier Hernandez; October 1, 1992 (age 34); St. Louis, Missouri, U.S.
- Other names: El Gran Chango; The Great
- Height: 5 ft 9 in (1.75 m)
- Weight: 155 lb (70 kg; 11.1 st)
- Division: Lightweight (155 lbs) (2014–present); Featherweight (145 lbs) (2012–2013; 2022–2024)
- Reach: 72 in (183 cm)
- Fighting out of: San Antonio, Texas, U.S.
- Team: Ohana Academy; Factory X (2020–present)
- Trainer: Jason Yerrington (2010–present)
- Rank: Black belt in Brazilian Jiu-Jitsu
- Years active: 2012–present

Mixed martial arts record
- Total: 28
- Wins: 19
- By knockout: 9
- By submission: 2
- By decision: 8
- Losses: 9
- By knockout: 3
- By submission: 1
- By decision: 5

Other information
- Mixed martial arts record from Sherdog

Alexander Xavier Hernandez (born October 1, 1992) is an American mixed martial artist currently competing in the Lightweight division of the Ultimate Fighting Championship.

== Background ==
Hernandez began wrestling at the age of 13 and started training in other martial arts as he progressed through education. After graduating from Reagan High School, Alexander entered college from where he graduated with a Bachelor's degree in Business Finance from the University of Texas at San Antonio. Hernandez worked as a mortgage loan officer as he was recovering from a MCL and meniscus injury.

== Mixed martial arts career ==
=== Early career ===
Hernandez compiled an amateur MMA record of 3–0 before making his professional debut in the spring of 2012.

He competed for various regional promotions such as Legacy Fighting Alliance and Resurrection Fighting Alliance and by 2018, he had amassed a 8–1 MMA record before signing with the UFC in early 2018.

=== Ultimate Fighting Championship ===
Hernandez made his promotional debut as a short notice replacement filling in for Bobby Green against Beneil Dariush on March 3, 2018, at UFC 222. Hernandez won the fight via knockout in the fight's opening minute. He was awarded a $50,000 bonus for Performance of the Night.

Hernandez next faced Olivier Aubin-Mercier on July 28, 2018, at UFC on Fox 30. He won the fight via unanimous decision.

Hernandez was expected to face Francisco Trinaldo on January 26, 2019, at UFC 233. However, Hernandez was pulled from that fight in favor of a bout with former UFC Lightweight Championship challenger Donald Cerrone a week earlier at UFC Fight Night: Cejudo vs. Dillashaw. He lost the fight via TKO in the second round. For their performance, both participants were awarded Fight of the Night.

Hernandez faced Francisco Trinaldo on July 20, 2019, at UFC on ESPN 4, which took place in Hernandez's home state of Texas. He won the fight via unanimous decision. The fight was the subject of much debate, with 11 of 13 media outlets scoring the bout in favor of Trinaldo.

Hernández was expected to face Islam Makhachev on April 18, 2020, at UFC 249. However, Makhachev was removed from the event after Russia restricted air travel due to the COVID-19 pandemic and was replaced by Omar Morales. On April 9, Dana White, the president of UFC announced that the event was postponed. Hernandez was rescheduled to May 13, 2020, at UFC Fight Night 171 and faced Drew Dober instead. He lost the fight via technical knockout in round two.

Hernández faced Chris Gruetzemacher on October 31, 2020, at UFC Fight Night 181. He won the fight via knockout in the first round. This win earned him Performance Fight of the Night award.

Hernández faced Thiago Moisés on February 27, 2021, at UFC Fight Night 186. He lost the fight via unanimous decision.

Hernández was scheduled to face Leonardo Santos on October 2, 2021, at UFC Fight Night 193. However, Santos was forced to withdraw from the event, citing a calf injury and was replaced by Mike Breeden. At the weigh-ins, Breeden weighed in at 158.5 pounds, two and a half pounds over the lightweight non-title fight limit. The bout proceeded at catchweight and Breeden was fined 20% of his purse which went to Hernandez. Hernandez won the fight via knockout in round one.

Hernández faced Renato Moicano on February 12, 2022, at UFC 271. He lost the bout via rear-naked choke in the second round.

Hernandez faced Billy Quarantillo on December 10, 2022, at UFC 282. He lost the fight via technical knockout in round two.

Hernandez faced Jim Miller, replacing Gabriel Benítez on February 18, 2023, at UFC Fight Night 219. He won the fight via unanimous decision.

Hernandez faced Bill Algeo on October 7, 2023, at UFC Fight Night 229. He lost the fight via unanimous decision.

Hernandez faced Damon Jackson on April 6, 2024, at UFC Fight Night 240. At the weigh-ins, Hernandez weighed in at 147.5 pounds, one and a half pounds over the featherweight non-title fight limit. His bout proceeded at catchweight and he was fined 20% of his purse, which went to his opponent Jackson. Hernandez lost the bout by split decision.

On short notice and replacing Nate Landwehr, Hernandez faced former LFA Lightweight Champion Austin Hubbard on October 5, 2024 at UFC 307. He won the fight by split decision.

Hernandez faced Kurt Holobaugh on March 15, 2025, at UFC Fight Night 254. He won the fight by unanimous decision.

Hernandez faced Chase Hooper on August 16, 2025, at UFC 319. He won the fight via technical knockout in round one.

Hernandez faced Carlos Diego Ferreira on September 13, 2025, at UFC Fight Night 259. He won the fight by technical knockout in the second round.

Hernandez was scheduled to face Michael Johnson on January 24, 2026 at UFC 324. However, the fight was cancelled on the day of the event, with the promotion giving no official reason. The cancellation followed notable betting‑line movement on the matchup, and it was reported that some observers speculated Hernandez may have been dealing with an injury, although this was not confirmed by the UFC. UFC CEO and president Dana White later confirmed that the fight had been pulled from the card due to betting concerns.

Hernandez faced Rafa García on April 25, 2026, at UFC Fight Night 274. He lost the fight via unanimous decision.

Hernandez faced Rafael dos Anjos on October 3, 2026 at UFC 332. He won the fight by technical knockout in the second round.

== Championships and accomplishments ==
=== Mixed martial arts ===
- Ultimate Fighting Championship
  - Performance of the Night (Two times) vs. Beneil Dariush and Chris Gruetzemacher
  - Fight of the Night (One time) vs. Donald Cerrone
  - UFC.com Awards
    - 2018: Upset of the Year vs. Beneil Dariush & Ranked #2 Newcomer of the Year
- Hero Fighting Championship
  - Hero FC Lightweight Champion (One time)
- MMADNA.nl
  - 2018 UFC Debut of the Year.

== Mixed martial arts record ==
Professional record breakdown
28 matches	19 wins	9 losses
By knockout	9	3
By submission	2	1
By decision	8	5

Res.	Record	Opponent	Method	Event	Date	Round	Time	Location	Notes
Win	19–9	Rafael dos Anjos	TKO (punches)	UFC 332	October 3, 2026	2	3:12	Salt Lake City, Utah, United States	
Loss	18–9	Rafa García	Decision (unanimous)	UFC Fight Night: Sterling vs. Zalal	April 25, 2026	3	5:00	Las Vegas, Nevada, United States	
Win	18–8	Carlos Diego Ferreira	TKO (punches)	UFC Fight Night: Lopes vs. Silva	September 13, 2025	2	3:46	San Antonio, Texas, United States	
Win	17–8	Chase Hooper	TKO (punches)	UFC 319	August 16, 2025	1	4:58	Chicago, Illinois, United States	
Win	16–8	Kurt Holobaugh	Decision (unanimous)	UFC Fight Night: Vettori vs. Dolidze 2	March 15, 2025	3	5:00	Las Vegas, Nevada, United States	
Win	15–8	Austin Hubbard	Decision (split)	UFC 307	October 5, 2024	3	5:00	Salt Lake City, Utah, United States	Return to Lightweight.
Loss	14–8	Damon Jackson	Decision (split)	UFC Fight Night: Allen vs. Curtis 2	April 6, 2024	3	5:00	Las Vegas, Nevada, United States	Catchweight (147.5 lb) bout; Hernandez missed weight.
Loss	14–7	Bill Algeo	Decision (unanimous)	UFC Fight Night: Dawson vs. Green	October 7, 2023	3	5:00	Las Vegas, Nevada, United States	
Win	14–6	Jim Miller	Decision (unanimous)	UFC Fight Night: Andrade vs. Blanchfield	February 18, 2023	3	5:00	Las Vegas, Nevada, United States	Lightweight bout.
Loss	13–6	Billy Quarantillo	TKO (knees and punches)	UFC 282	December 10, 2022	2	4:30	Las Vegas, Nevada, United States	Return to Featherweight.
Loss	13–5	Renato Moicano	Submission (rear-naked choke)	UFC 271	February 12, 2022	2	1:23	Houston, Texas, United States	
Win	13–4	Mike Breeden	KO (punch)	UFC Fight Night: Santos vs. Walker	October 2, 2021	1	1:20	Las Vegas, Nevada, United States	Catchweight (158.5 lb) bout; Breeden missed weight.
Loss	12–4	Thiago Moisés	Decision (unanimous)	UFC Fight Night: Rozenstruik vs. Gane	February 27, 2021	3	5:00	Las Vegas, Nevada, United States	
Win	12–3	Chris Gruetzemacher	KO (punches)	UFC Fight Night: Hall vs. Silva	October 31, 2020	1	1:46	Las Vegas, Nevada, United States	Performance of the Night.
Loss	11–3	Drew Dober	TKO (punches)	UFC Fight Night: Smith vs. Teixeira	May 13, 2020	2	4:25	Jacksonville, Florida, United States	
Win	11–2	Francisco Trinaldo	Decision (unanimous)	UFC on ESPN: dos Anjos vs. Edwards	July 20, 2019	3	5:00	San Antonio, Texas, United States	
Loss	10–2	Donald Cerrone	TKO (head kick and punches)	UFC Fight Night: Cejudo vs. Dillashaw	January 19, 2019	2	3:43	Brooklyn, New York, United States	Fight of the Night.
Win	10–1	Olivier Aubin-Mercier	Decision (unanimous)	UFC on Fox: Alvarez vs. Poirier 2	July 28, 2018	3	5:00	Calgary, Alberta, Canada	
Win	9–1	Beneil Dariush	KO (punch)	UFC 222	March 3, 2018	1	0:42	Las Vegas, Nevada, United States	Performance of the Night.
Win	8–1	Derrick Adkins	TKO (punches)	LFA 27	November 10, 2017	3	1:53	Shawnee, Oklahoma, United States	Catchweight (160 lb) bout; Adkins missed weight.
Win	7–1	Chris Pecero	Submission (rear-naked choke)	RFA 41	July 29, 2016	1	1:27	San Antonio, Texas, United States	
Win	6–1	Rodrigo Sotelo Jr.	Submission (rear-naked choke)	Hero FC: Best of the Best 6	September 26, 2015	1	4:44	El Paso, Texas, United States	Won the Hero FC Lightweight Championship.
Win	5–1	Jacob Capelli	Decision (unanimous)	Hero FC: Best of the Best 4	January 17, 2015	3	3:00	Brownsville, Texas, United States	
Win	4–1	Martin Walker	TKO (punches)	Hero FC: Best of the Best 3	September 12, 2014	1	2:59	Brownsville, Texas, United States	Lightweight debut.
Win	3–1	Joel Scott	Decision (unanimous)	Hero FC: Texas Pride 1	September 28, 2013	3	3:00	Beaumont, Texas, United States	
Loss	2–1	Jamall Emmers	Decision (split)	Hero FC: Pride of the Valley 2	June 21, 2013	3	5:00	Pharr, Texas, United States	
Win	2–0	David Salazar	TKO (punches)	Hero FC: Pride of the Valley 1	March 16, 2013	1	0:34	Pharr, Texas, United States	
Win	1–0	Dimitre Ivy	Decision (unanimous)	Kickass Productions 3	October 20, 2012	3	3:00	Seguin, Texas, United States	Featherweight debut.

== See also ==
- List of current UFC fighters
- List of male mixed martial artists
