= UFC Fight Night: Hernandez vs. Pereira =

Mixed martial arts event in 2024

- The poster for UFC Fight Night: Hernandez vs. Pereira
- Promotion: Ultimate Fighting Championship
- Date: October 19, 2024
- Venue: UFC Apex
- City: Enterprise, Nevada, United States
- Attendance: Not announced

Event chronology
UFC Fight Night: Royval vs. Taira	UFC Fight Night: Hernandez vs. Pereira	UFC 308: Topuria vs. Holloway

UFC Fight Night: Hernandez vs. Pereira (also known as UFC Fight Night 245, UFC on ESPN+ 103 and UFC Vegas 99) was a mixed martial arts event produced by the Ultimate Fighting Championship that took place on October 19, 2024, at the UFC Apex facility in Las Vegas, Nevada, United States.

== Background ==
A middleweight bout between former LFA Middleweight Champion Anthony Hernandez and Michel Pereira served as the main event. The pairing was expected to take place at UFC 306, before being moved to this event.

Former Invicta FC Atomweight Champion Rayanne dos Santos was expected to face Alice Ardelean in a women's strawweight bout at the event. However, Santos withdrew in early September due to a broken arm. She was replaced by Melissa Martinez.

A bantamweight bout between Jake Hadley and Brady Hiestand was scheduled for this event. However, Hiestand withdrew from the fight for unknown reasons and was replaced by promotional newcomer Cameron Smotherman on under one week's notice.

At the weigh-ins, Joselyne Edwards weighed in at 139 pounds, three pounds over the bantamweight non-title fight limit. The bout proceeded at catchweight and Edwards was fined 30 percent of her purse which went to her opponent Vidal.

== Results ==
Main card (ESPN+)
Weight class				Method	Round	Time	Notes
Middleweight	Anthony Hernandez	def.	Michel Pereira	TKO (elbows)	5	2:22
Bantamweight	Rob Font	def.	Kyler Phillips	Decision (unanimous) (29–28, 29–28, 29–28)	3	5:00
Flyweight	Charles Johnson	def.	Su Mudaerji	Decision (unanimous) (29–28, 29–28, 29–28)	3	5:00
Bantamweight	Cameron Smotherman	def.	Jake Hadley	Decision (unanimous) (30–26, 29–27, 29–27)	3	5:00	(Note: Hadley was deducted one point in round 2 due to an eye poke.)
Featherweight	Darren Elkins	def.	Daniel Pineda	Decision (unanimous) (29–28, 29–28, 29–28)	3	5:00
Preliminary card (ESPN+)
Flyweight	Asu Almabayev	def.	Matheus Nicolau	Decision (unanimous) (29–28, 29–28, 29–28)	3	5:00
Bantamweight	Jean Matsumoto	def.	Brad Katona	Decision (unanimous) (29–28, 29–28, 29–28)	3	5:00
Catchweight (139 lbs)	Joselyne Edwards	def.	Tamires Vidal	Submission (face crank)	3	4:33
Women's Strawweight	Elise Reed	def.	Jessica Penne	Decision (unanimous) (29–28, 29–28, 29–28)	3	5:00
Women's Strawweight	Melissa Martinez	def.	Alice Ardelean	Decision (unanimous) (30–27, 30–27, 30–27)	3	5:00
Heavyweight	Austen Lane	def.	Robelis Despaigne	Decision (unanimous) (29–28, 29–28, 29–28)	3	5:00

== Bonus awards ==
The following fighters received $50,000 bonuses.

- Fight of the Night: Darren Elkins vs. Daniel Pineda
- Performance of the Night: Anthony Hernandez

== See also ==
- 2024 in UFC
- List of current UFC fighters
- List of UFC events
