= UFC Fight Night: Royval vs. Taira =

Mixed martial arts event in 2024

- The poster for UFC Fight Night: Royval vs. Taira
- Promotion: Ultimate Fighting Championship
- Date: October 12, 2024
- Venue: UFC Apex
- City: Enterprise, Nevada, United States
- Attendance: Not announced

Event chronology
UFC 307: Pereira vs. Rountree Jr.	UFC Fight Night: Royval vs. Taira	UFC Fight Night: Hernandez vs. Pereira

UFC Fight Night: Royval vs. Taira (also known as UFC Fight Night 244, UFC on ESPN+ 102 and UFC Vegas 98) was a mixed martial arts event produced by the Ultimate Fighting Championship that took place on October 12, 2024, at the UFC Apex in Enterprise, Nevada, part of the Las Vegas Valley, United States.

== Background ==
A flyweight bout between former UFC Flyweight Championship challenger (also former LFA Flyweight Champion) Brandon Royval and undefeated prospect Tatsuro Taira headlined the event.

A middleweight bout between Brad Tavares and Park Jun-yong was expected to take place at UFC on ESPN: Lemos vs. Jandiroba in July 2024, but it was scrapped when Park was not medically cleared after the weigh-ins. They were then rescheduled for this event.

A bantamweight bout between former UFC Bantamweight Champion Cody Garbrandt and former LFA Bantamweight Champion Miles Johns was scheduled for this event. However, the bout was moved to UFC Fight Night 247 for unknown reasons.

A women's strawweight bout between Polyana Viana and Cory McKenna was scheduled for this event. However, Viana withdrew from the fight for unknown reasons and was replaced by Julia Polastri.

A heavyweight bout between Chris Barnett and former LFA Heavyweight Champion Waldo Cortes-Acosta was scheduled for this event. However, Cortes-Acosta withdrew from the fight for unknown reasons and was replaced by Junior Tafa. Subsequently, Barnett withdrew after being unable to travel due to Hurricane Milton and was replaced by promotional newcomer Sean Sharaf.

Terrance McKinney was briefly announced to compete on the card in a lightweight bout against a to-be-named opponent. However, he was removed from the card for unknown reasons.

At the weigh-ins, three fighters missed weight:

- Jared Gooden weighed in at 172.5 pounds, one and a half pounds over the welterweight non-title fight limit.
- Dan Argueta weighed in at 138.5 pounds, two and a half pounds over the bantamweight non-title fight limit.
- Josh Fremd weighed in at 189 pounds, three pounds over the middleweight non-title fight limit.

Gooden and Argueta's bouts proceeded at catchweight and they were fined 20 percent of their individual purses which went to their opponents Chidi Njokuani and Cody Haddon respectively. Fremd’s bout with Abdul Razak Alhassan was canceled as a result.

== Results ==
Main card (ESPN+)
Weight class				Method	Round	Time	Notes
Flyweight	Brandon Royval	def.	Tatsuro Taira	Decision (split) (47–48, 48–47, 48–47)	5	5:00
Middleweight	Park Jun-yong	def.	Brad Tavares	Decision (split) (28–29, 29–28, 29–28)	3	5:00
Catchweight (172.5 lb)	Chidi Njokuani	def.	Jared Gooden	Decision (unanimous) (30–27, 30–27, 30–27)	3	5:00
Lightweight	Grant Dawson	def.	Rafa García	TKO (elbows and punches)	2	1:42
Welterweight	Daniel Rodriguez	def.	Alex Morono	Decision (split) (28–29, 29–28, 29–28)	3	5:00
Preliminary card (ESPN+)
Flyweight	Ramazan Temirov	def.	C.J. Vergara	TKO (punches)	1	2:50
Featherweight	Pat Sabatini	def.	Jonathan Pearce	Submission (rear-naked choke)	1	4:06
Welterweight	Themba Gorimbo	def.	Niko Price	Decision (unanimous) (30–27, 30–27, 30–27)	3	5:00
Heavyweight	Junior Tafa	def.	Sean Sharaf	TKO (punches)	2	2:15
Women's Strawweight	Julia Polastri	def.	Cory McKenna	Decision (split) (29–28, 28–29, 30–27)	3	5:00
Catchweight (138.5 lb)	Cody Haddon	def.	Daniel Argueta	Decision (unanimous) (30–27, 30–27, 30–27)	3	5:00
Flyweight	Clayton Carpenter	def.	Lucas Rocha	Technical Submission (rear-naked choke)	2	2:12

== Bonus awards ==
The following fighters received $50,000 bonuses.

- Fight of the Night: Brandon Royval vs. Tatsuro Taira
- Performance of the Night: Ramazan Temirov and Clayton Carpenter

== See also ==
- 2024 in UFC
- List of current UFC fighters
- List of UFC events
