= UFC 326 =

Mixed martial arts event in 2026

UFC 326: Holloway vs. Oliveira 2
- The poster for UFC 326: Holloway vs. Oliveira 2
- Promotion: Ultimate Fighting Championship
- Date: March 7, 2026
- Venue: T-Mobile Arena
- City: Paradise, Nevada, United States
- Attendance: 19,480
- Total gate: $8,305,158

Event chronology
UFC Fight Night: Moreno vs. Kavanagh	UFC 326: Holloway vs. Oliveira 2	UFC Fight Night: Emmett vs. Vallejos

UFC 326: Holloway vs. Oliveira 2 was a mixed martial arts event produced by the Ultimate Fighting Championship that took place on March 7, 2026, at the T-Mobile Arena in Paradise, Nevada, part of the Las Vegas Valley, United States.

== Background ==
The event was the first featured official broadcast on CBS after the new media rights agreement with Paramount Skydance began in January, as the network partially aired the card during the final hour of the prelims along with the first hour of the main card. The remainder of the main card including the main event aired exclusively on Paramount+. The CBS simulcast marked the promotion's best linear television ratings in a decade. According to the Nielsen Ratings System, the two-hour broadcast window averaged 2.47 million viewers, while the first hour of the main card averaged over 2.8 million. The broadcast peaked at 3.1 million viewers during the middleweight bout between Gregory Rodrigues and Brunno Ferreira.

Former UFC Featherweight Champion Max Holloway defended his symbolic "BMF" (baddest motherfucker) title against former UFC Lightweight Champion Charles Oliveira in a lightweight bout serving as the event's headliner. The two fighters previously met in August 2015 at UFC Fight Night: Holloway vs. Oliveira, where Oliveira was defeated via first-round technical knockout in a featherweight bout after sustaining an apparent neck and shoulder injury during a takedown attempt, which rendered him unable to continue. The injury was later reported as a minor neck injury.

Former UFC Middleweight Championship challenger Paulo Costa was initially expected to face Brunno Ferreira in a middleweight bout at the event. However, Costa withdrew on December 26 for undisclosed reasons and was replaced by former LFA Middleweight Champion Gregory Rodrigues, setting up a rematch between them. The two previously met at UFC 283 in January 2023, where Rodrigues was defeated by first-round knockout.

A bantamweight bout between Rob Font and Raul Rosas Jr. took place at the event. The pairing was originally scheduled as the co-main event for UFC Fight Night: Lopes vs. Silva in September 2025, but Rosas Jr. withdrew due to a rib injury.

A lightweight rematch between former lightweight title challenger Renato Moicano and former featherweight title challenger Brian Ortega was scheduled for this event. The pair had previously met in a featherweight bout at UFC 214 in July 2017, where Ortega won via third‑round guillotine choke. In turn, Ortega withdrew due to injury with Moicano later being moved to headline UFC Fight Night: Moicano vs. Duncan one month afterward.

A middleweight bout between Duško Todorović and undefeated prospect Donte Johnson was scheduled for this event. However, Todorović withdrew for undisclosed reasons and was replaced by Cody Brundage.

A featherweight bout between Yoo Joo-sang and Gaston Bolaños was scheduled for this event. However, Yoo withdrew due to a foot injury and was replaced by Lee Jeong-yeong. In turn, the pairing was cancelled during the weigh-ins due to weight management issues with Lee.

During the event's broadcast, it was announced that the UFC Women's Strawweight Championship bout that took place in March 2020 at UFC 248 between then-champion Zhang Weili (who would go on to become a two-time champion) and former champion Joanna Jędrzejczyk would be inducted into the "fight wing" of the UFC Hall of Fame. It is the first women's bout to receive the honor and will be recognized during International Fight Week festivities in Las Vegas this summer. Zhang defended the title via unanimous decision in a fight that is widely regarded as the greatest to ever take place between two women in mixed martial arts history.

== Results ==
Main card (Paramount+ / CBS)
Weight class				Method	Round	Time	Notes
Lightweight	Charles Oliveira	def.	Max Holloway (c)	Decision (unanimous) (50–45, 50–45, 50–45)	5	5:00	(Note: For the symbolic "BMF" title.)
Middleweight	Caio Borralho	def.	Reinier de Ridder	Decision (unanimous) (30–27, 30–27, 30–27)	3	5:00
Bantamweight	Raul Rosas Jr.	def.	Rob Font	Decision (unanimous) (30–27, 30–27, 30–27)	3	5:00
Lightweight	Drew Dober	def.	Michael Johnson	KO (punch)	2	1:53
Middleweight	Gregory Rodrigues	def.	Brunno Ferreira	KO (punch)	1	1:47
Preliminary card (Paramount+ / CBS)
Bantamweight	Cody Garbrandt	def.	Xiao Long	Decision (unanimous) (28–27, 28–27, 28–27)	3	5:00	(Note: Xiao was deducted two points in round 3 due to multiple illegal groin strikes.)
Middleweight	Donte Johnson	def.	Cody Brundage	Decision (split) (29–28, 28–29, 29–28)	3	5:00
Featherweight	Alberto Montes	def.	Ricky Turcios	Technical Submission (anaconda choke)	2	0:40
Flyweight	Nyamjargal Tumendemberel	def.	Cody Durden	Decision (unanimous) (30–27, 30–27, 29–28)	3	5:00
Early preliminary card (Paramount+ / UFC Fight Pass)
Flyweight	Su Mudaerji	def.	Jesús Santos Aguilar	Decision (unanimous) (30–27, 30–27, 30–27)	3	5:00
Light Heavyweight	Diyar Nurgozhay	def.	Rafael Tobias	Decision (unanimous) (30–27, 29–28, 29–28)	3	5:00
Light Heavyweight	Rodolfo Bellato	def.	Luke Fernandez	TKO (punches)	1	2:42

== Bonus awards ==
The following fighters received $100,000 bonuses.

- Fight of the Night: No bonus awarded.
- Performance of the Night: Drew Dober, Gregory Rodrigues, Alberto Montes, and Rodolfo Bellato

== See also ==
- 2026 in UFC
- List of current UFC fighters
- List of UFC events
