= UFC 277 =

Mixed martial arts event in 2022

UFC 277: Peña vs. Nunes 2
- The poster for UFC 277: Peña vs. Nunes 2
- Promotion: Ultimate Fighting Championship
- Date: July 30, 2022
- Venue: American Airlines Center
- City: Dallas, Texas, United States
- Attendance: 19,442
- Total gate: $4,455,691

Event chronology
UFC Fight Night: Blaydes vs. Aspinall	UFC 277: Peña vs. Nunes 2	UFC on ESPN: Santos vs. Hill

UFC 277: Peña vs. Nunes 2 was a mixed martial arts event produced by the Ultimate Fighting Championship that took place on July 30, 2022, at American Airlines Center in Dallas, Texas, United States.

== Background ==
A UFC Women's Bantamweight Championship rematch between current champion (also The Ultimate Fighter: Team Rousey vs. Team Tate bantamweight winner) Julianna Peña and former champion (also then UFC Women's Featherweight Champion) Amanda Nunes headlined the event. The pairing previously met at UFC 269 in last December, where Peña captured the title by submission in the second round in a major upset. They were also the head coaches for the 30th season of The Ultimate Fighter. This was the seventh time in UFC history that champions in different divisions fought for the same title, following UFC 94, UFC 205, UFC 226, UFC 232, UFC Fight Night: Cejudo vs. Dillashaw and UFC 259.

An interim UFC Flyweight Championship bout between former champion Brandon Moreno and Kai Kara-France took place at the event. The pairing previously met at UFC 245 in December 2019, with Moreno winning via unanimous decision. Alexandre Pantoja served as backup and potential replacement for this fight.

Sean Strickland was expected to face former Glory Middleweight and Light Heavyweight Champion Alex Pereira in a middleweight bout at this event. However, the promotion decided to move the pairing to UFC 276.

A middleweight bout between former Strikeforce and UFC Middleweight Champion Luke Rockhold and former title challenger Paulo Costa was expected to take place at the event. However, the bout was postponed to UFC 278 for unknown reasons.

A welterweight bout between Orion Cosce and Mike Mathetha took place at the event. The duo was previously scheduled to meet at UFC 271 and UFC 275, but the bout was cancelled due to Mathetha getting injured and Cosce pulling out due to undisclosed reasons, respectively.

Ji Yeon Kim and Mariya Agapova were expected to meet in a women's flyweight bout at the event. However, Agapova was forced out of the fight due to a knee injury and was replaced by Joselyne Edwards who had fought only six weeks prior in UFC 275.

Carlos Diego Ferreira was scheduled to meet Drakkar Klose in a lightweight bout. However, Ferreira was forced out the event in mid July due to an injury. He was replaced by Rafa García.

A lightweight bout featuring Ignacio Bahamondes and Ľudovít Klein was originally scheduled for the preliminary card. However, Bahamondes pulled out on July 15 and Klein was relocated against Mason Jones a week earlier at UFC Fight Night: Blaydes vs. Aspinall.

Justin Tafa and Don'Tale Mayes were expected to meet in a heavyweight bout at the preliminary card. Tafa pulled out due to undisclosed reasons and was replaced by promotional newcomer Hamdy Abdelwahab on July 18.

Ramiz Brahimaj was scheduled to meet Michael Morales in a welterweight bout. However, Brahimaj was forced out the event in mid July due to an undisclosed injury. He was replaced by Adam Fugitt.

At the weigh-ins, two fighters missed weight for their respective bouts. Joselyne Edwards weighed in at 137.5 pounds, one and a half pounds over the bantamweight non-title fight limit. Orion Cosce weighed in at 172.5 pounds, one and a half pounds over the welterweight non-title fight limit. Both bouts proceeded at catchweight with Edwards and Cosce each fined 20% of their purses, which went to their opponents Ji Yeon Kim and Mike Mathetha respectively.

== Results ==
Main card
Weight class				Method	Round	Time	Notes
Women's Bantamweight	Amanda Nunes	def.	Julianna Peña (c)	Decision (unanimous) (50–45, 50–44, 50–43)	5	5:00	(Note: For the UFC Women's Bantamweight Championship.)
Flyweight	Brandon Moreno	def.	Kai Kara-France	TKO (body kick and punches)	3	4:34	(Note: For the interim UFC Flyweight Championship.)
Heavyweight	Sergei Pavlovich	def.	Derrick Lewis	TKO (punches)	1	0:55
Flyweight	Alexandre Pantoja	def.	Alex Perez	Submission (neck crank)	1	1:31
Light Heavyweight	Magomed Ankalaev	def.	Anthony Smith	TKO (punches)	2	3:09
Preliminary card (ESPN / ABC / ESPN+)
Welterweight	Alex Morono	def.	Matthew Semelsberger	Decision (unanimous) (29–28, 29–28, 30–27)	3	5:00
Lightweight	Drew Dober	def.	Rafael Alves	KO (punch to the body)	3	1:30
Heavyweight	Hamdy Abdelwahab	vs.	Don'Tale Mayes	No Contest (overturned)	3	5:00	(Note: Originally a split decision (29–28, 28–29, 29–28) win for Abdelwahab; overturned after he tested positive for methenolone.)
Lightweight	Drakkar Klose	def.	Rafa García	Decision (unanimous) (29–28, 29–28, 29–28)	3	5:00
Early preliminary card (ESPN+ / UFC Fight Pass)
Welterweight	Michael Morales	def.	Adam Fugitt	TKO (punches)	3	1:09
Catchweight (137.5 lb)	Joselyne Edwards	def.	Ji Yeon Kim	Decision (split) (28–29, 29–28, 30–27)	3	5:00
Light Heavyweight	Nicolae Negumereanu	def.	Ihor Potieria	TKO (punches and knees)	2	3:33
Catchweight (172.5 lb)	Orion Cosce	def.	Mike Mathetha	Decision (unanimous) (29–28, 29–28, 29–28)	3	5:00

== Bonus awards ==
The following fighters received $50,000 bonuses.

- Fight of the Night: Brandon Moreno vs. Kai Kara-France
- Performance of the Night: Alexandre Pantoja and Drew Dober

The following fighters received Crypto.com "Fan Bonus of the Night" awards paid in bitcoin of US$30,000 for first place, US$20,000 for second place, and US$10,000 for third place.

- First Place: Brandon Moreno
- Second Place: Amanda Nunes
- Third Place: Derrick Lewis

== Aftermath ==
On February 3, 2023, it was announced that the United States Anti-Doping Agency (USADA) suspended Hamdy Abdelwahab for two years after he tested positive twice for anabolic agent methenolone and its metabolites. He also was flagged for a tampering violation. His victory was also overturned to a no contest and he will be eligible to return to competition on July 30, 2024, two years from the first positive test.

== See also ==
- List of UFC events
- List of current UFC fighters
- 2022 in UFC
