= Rafa García (fighter) =

Mexican mixed martial arts fighter

- Born: Rafael García Jr. August 5, 1994 (age 32); Brawley, California, U.S.
- Other names: Gifted
- Nationality: Mexican; American
- Height: 5 ft 7 in (1.70 m)
- Weight: 155 lb (70 kg; 11 st 1 lb)
- Division: Lightweight
- Reach: 70.0 in (178 cm)
- Fighting out of: Mexicali, Baja California, Mexico
- Team: Team Punisher; Yuma United MMA (formerly); UFC GYM Costa Mesa (2017–present); Huntington Beach Ultimate Training Center
- Rank: Brown belt in Brazilian Jiu-Jitsu under Philippe "Furão" Della Monica e Carlos Gracie Jr.
- Years active: 2014–present

Mixed martial arts record
- Total: 23
- Wins: 18
- By knockout: 2
- By submission: 8
- By decision: 8
- Losses: 5
- By knockout: 1
- By decision: 4

Other information
- Mixed martial arts record from Sherdog

Rafael García Jr. (born August 5, 1994) is a Mexican and American professional mixed martial artist who currently competes in the Lightweight division of the Ultimate Fighting Championship. A professional since 2014, García is also a former Combate Americas Lightweight Champion.

== Background ==
García was born in Brawley, California to Mexican parents and grew up in El Centro, California, and has a sister and a younger brother. He started training martial arts at the age of 13 when his father took him to a gym to learn self-defense. He graduated from Imperial High School where he wrestled for one year. He lives in Mexicali, Baja California since 2013.

== Mixed martial arts career ==
=== Early career ===
Racking up a 4–0 record in Mexico, García participated in the inaugural Combate Americas open tryouts and receiving a contract after winning the tryouts. In Combate Americas García went undefeated 8–0 and claiming the Combate Americas Lightweight Championship against Erick Gonzalez at Combate 44 on September 20, 2019. He successfully defended the title against Humberto Bandenay at Combate 55 on February 21, 2020. On June 13, 2020, García announced that he had vacated the title.

=== Ultimate Fighting Championship ===
On March 10, 2021, it was announced that García would be replacing Don Madge against Nasrat Haqparast at UFC Fight Night: Edwards vs. Muhammad on March 13, 2021. He lost the fight via unanimous decision.

In his sophomore appearance, García faced Chris Gruetzemacher at UFC on ESPN 28 on July 31, 2021. Despite knocking Gruetzemacher down in the first round, García went on to lose the fight via unanimous decision.

García then faced Natan Levy at UFC Fight Night 198 on November 20, 2021. He won the bout via unanimous decision.

García faced Jesse Ronson on April 16, 2022, at UFC on ESPN 34. He won the fight via rear-naked choke in round two.

García faced Drakkar Klose, replacing injured Carlos Diego Ferreira, on July 30, 2022, at UFC 277. He lost the fight via unanimous decision.

García faced Hayisaer Maheshate on December 17, 2022, at UFC Fight Night 216. At the weigh-ins, Hayisaer Maheshate weighed in at 158.5 pounds, two and a half pounds over the lightweight non-title fight limit. The bout proceeded at catchweight and Maheshate was fined 20% of his purse, which went to García. García won the fight via unanimous decision.

García faced Clay Guida on April 15, 2023, at UFC on ESPN 44. He won the fight by unanimous decision.

García faced Grant Dawson on October 12, 2024, at UFC Fight Night 244. He lost the fight by technical knockout via ground elbows and punches in the second round.

García was scheduled to face Joaquim Silva on March 29, 2025, at UFC on ESPN 64. However, Silva withdrew from the fight for unknown reasons and was replaced by Vinc Pichel. García defeated Pichel via unanimous decision.

García faced Jared Gordon on September 13, 2025, at UFC Fight Night 259. He won the fight by technical knockout via punches and elbows in the third round.

García faced Alexander Hernandez on April 25, 2026, at UFC Fight Night 274. He won the fight via unanimous decision.

García faced Rong Zhu on September 12, 2026, at UFC Fight Night 288. He lost the fight by unanimous decision.

== Personal life ==
García and his wife have a daughter (born 2019) and a son (born 2021), both born in Mexicali, Mexico.

== Championships and accomplishments ==
- Combate Americas
  - Combate Americas Lightweight Championship (one time; first; former)
    - One successful title defense

== Mixed martial arts record ==
Professional record breakdown
23 matches	18 wins	5 losses
By knockout	2	1
By submission	8	0
By decision	8	4

Res.	Record	Opponent	Method	Event	Date	Round	Time	Location	Notes
Loss	18–5	Rong Zhu	Decision (unanimous)	UFC Fight Night: Silva vs. Delgado	September 12, 2026	3	5:00	Glendale, Arizona, United States	
Win	18–4	Alexander Hernandez	Decision (unanimous)	UFC Fight Night: Sterling vs. Zalal	April 25, 2026	3	5:00	Las Vegas, Nevada, United States	
Win	17–4	Jared Gordon	TKO (elbows)	UFC Fight Night: Lopes vs. Silva	September 13, 2025	3	2:27	San Antonio, Texas, United States	
Win	16–4	Vinc Pichel	Decision (unanimous)	UFC on ESPN: Moreno vs. Erceg	March 29, 2025	3	5:00	Mexico City, Mexico	
Loss	15–4	Grant Dawson	TKO (elbows and punches)	UFC Fight Night: Royval vs. Taira	October 12, 2024	2	1:42	Las Vegas, Nevada, United States	
Win	15–3	Clay Guida	Decision (unanimous)	UFC on ESPN: Holloway vs. Allen	April 15, 2023	3	5:00	Kansas City, Missouri, United States	
Win	14–3	Hayisaer Maheshate	Decision (unanimous)	UFC Fight Night: Cannonier vs. Strickland	December 17, 2022	3	5:00	Las Vegas, Nevada, United States	Catchweight (158.5 lb) bout; Maheshate missed weight.
Loss	13–3	Drakkar Klose	Decision (unanimous)	UFC 277	July 30, 2022	3	5:00	Dallas, Texas, United States	
Win	13–2	Jesse Ronson	Submission (rear-naked choke)	UFC on ESPN: Luque vs. Muhammad 2	April 16, 2022	2	4:50	Las Vegas, Nevada, United States	García was deducted one point in round 2 due to an illegal knee.
Win	12–2	Natan Levy	Decision (unanimous)	UFC Fight Night: Vieira vs. Tate	November 20, 2021	3	5:00	Las Vegas, Nevada, United States	
Loss	11–2	Chris Gruetzemacher	Decision (unanimous)	UFC on ESPN: Hall vs. Strickland	July 31, 2021	3	5:00	Las Vegas, Nevada, United States	
Loss	11–1	Nasrat Haqparast	Decision (unanimous)	UFC Fight Night: Edwards vs. Muhammad	March 13, 2021	3	5:00	Las Vegas, Nevada, United States	
Win	11–0	Humberto Bandenay	Decision (unanimous)	Combate Americas 55	February 21, 2020	3	5:00	Mexicali, Mexico	Defended the Combate Americas Lightweight Championship.
Win	10–0	Erick Gonzalez	Decision (unanimous)	Combate Americas 44	September 20, 2019	3	5:00	Mexicali, Mexico	Won the inaugural Combate Americas Lightweight Championship.
Win	9–0	Estevan Payan	Submission (rear-naked choke)	Combate Americas 39	June 7, 2019	1	4:50	Tucson, Arizona, United States	
Win	8–0	Edgar Escarrega	Submission (rear-naked choke)	Combate Americas 30	February 8, 2019	2	1:07	Mexicali, Mexico	
Win	7–0	LaRue Burley	KO (punches)	Combate Americas 24	September 14, 2018	1	2:26	Phoenix, Arizona, United States	
Win	6–0	Chase Gibson	Decision (majority)	Combate Americas 20	April 13, 2018	3	5:00	Los Angeles, California, United States	Lightweight debut.
Win	5–0	Marcos Bonilla	Submission (armbar)	Combate Americas 17	September 15, 2017	2	1:07	Redlands, California, United States	
Win	4–0	Raúl Najera Ocampo	Submission (heel hook)	Combate Americas 10	January 19, 2017	1	1:04	Mexico City, Mexico	
Win	3–0	Jovany Amador	Submission (armbar)	Warrior CF 8	December 3, 2016	1	3:21	Mexicali, Mexico	
Win	2–0	Mike Sandoval	Submission (armbar)	Warrior CF 6	July 18, 2015	1	0:24	Mexicali, Mexico	
Win	1–0	Dante Ramos	Submission (armbar)	Extreme Full Contact 4	October 18, 2014	1	2:06	Mexicali, Mexico	Featherweight debut.

== See also ==
- List of current UFC fighters
- List of Mexican UFC fighters
- List of male mixed martial artists
