= Drakkar Klose =

American mixed martial artist

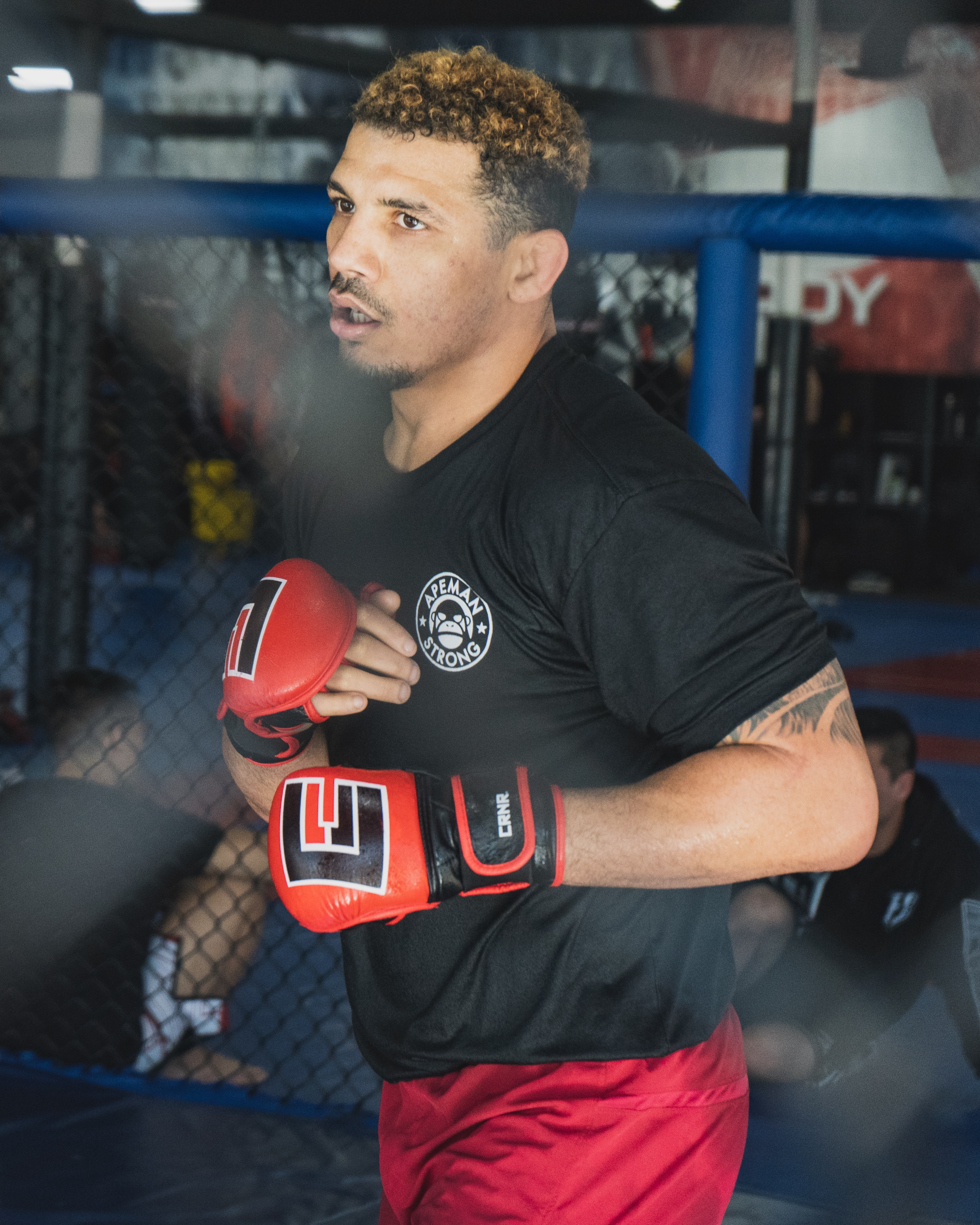
- Born: March 9, 1988 (age 38); Kalamazoo, Michigan, U.S.
- Height: 5 ft 8 in (1.73 m)
- Weight: 156 lb (71 kg; 11.1 st)
- Division: Lightweight
- Reach: 70 in (178 cm)
- Stance: Orthodox
- Fighting out of: Glendale, Arizona, U.S.
- Team: X1 Sports & Fitness (2011–2012); The MMA Lab (2013–2019, 2021–present); Fight Ready (2019–2020)
- Rank: Purple belt in Brazilian Jiu-Jitsu under Sadiq Daniels
- Years active: 2014–present

Mixed martial arts record
- Total: 21
- Wins: 16
- By knockout: 6
- By decision: 10
- Losses: 4
- By knockout: 2
- By submission: 1
- By decision: 1
- Draws: 1

Other information
- Mixed martial arts record from Sherdog

Drakkar Klose (born March 9, 1988) is an American mixed martial artist currently competing in the Lightweight division of the Ultimate Fighting Championship.

== Background ==
Born and raised alongside six other siblings in South Haven, Michigan, Klose had a standout wrestling career at South Haven High School, winning a state championship in 2005. He continued his career at North Idaho College before transferring to Lindenwood University for his junior year. After being kicked out of college, he relocated to Arizona in hopes of enhancing his mixed martial arts career.

== Mixed martial arts career ==
=== Early career ===
Klose begun his career as an amateur racking a 7–0 record. Prior to joining the UFC, Klose amassed a record of 7–0–1 in organizations such as Resurrection Fighting Alliance and World Fighting Federation.

Klose signed with the UFC in late 2016.

=== Ultimate Fighting Championship ===
Klose made his promotional debut on January 15, 2017, at UFC Fight Night 103 against fellow newcomer Devin Powell. He won the fight via unanimous decision.

Klose faced Marc Diakiese on July 7, 2017, at The Ultimate Fighter 25 Finale. He won the fight by split decision, after dropping his opponent with leg kicks in both the first and second round.

Klose faced David Teymur on December 2, 2017, at UFC 218. He lost the bout via unanimous decision.

Klose faced Lando Vannata on July 7, 2018, at UFC 226. He won the fight via unanimous decision.

Klose faced Bobby Green on December 15, 2018, at UFC on Fox 31 He won the fight by unanimous decision.

Klose was expected to face Beneil Dariush on July 13, 2019, at UFC Fight Night 155. However, on July 7, Dariush pulled out of the fight with an injury. As a result, UFC officials opted to remove Klose from the card and he is expected to be scheduled for a future event instead.

Klose faced Christos Giagos on August 17, 2019, at UFC 241. He won the back-and-forth fight via unanimous decision.

Klose next faced Beneil Dariush on March 7, 2020, at UFC 248, a rescheduling of the bout that was canceled in July 2019. He lost the fight via knockout in the second round.

Klose was scheduled to face Jai Herbert on February 20, 2021, at UFC Fight Night 185. However, Herbert pulled out in the weeks leading up to the event and was replaced by Luis Peña. However, the bout was cancelled after Klose's corner tested positive for COVID-19.

Klose was expected to face Jeremy Stephens at UFC on ESPN 22 on April 17, 2021. However, day of the event, it was announced that the bout was scrapped due to Klose sustaining a spinal injury as a result of being shoved by Stephens at the weigh-ins. Despite the fight not happening, it was reported that Klose would receive his show money and compliance pay.

After two-year absence from the octagon, Klose was scheduled to face Nikolas Motta on April 16, 2022, at UFC on ESPN 34. However, Motta was removed from the event for undisclosed reason and he was replaced by Brandon Jenkins. Klose won the fight via technical knockout in round two after knocking Jenkins down multiple times. This win earned him the Performance of the Night award.

Klose was scheduled to face Carlos Diego Ferreira on July 30, 2022, at UFC 277. However, Ferreira was forced out the event due an injury and he was replaced by Rafa García. Klose won the fight by unanimous decision.

Klose was scheduled to face Mark Madsen on October 29, 2022, at UFC Fight Night 213. However, Klose pulled out in mid-October due to an anterior cruciate ligament injury.

Klose faced Joe Solecki on December 2, 2023 at UFC on ESPN 52. Klose won the fight via knockout in round one after slamming Solecki on his head during an armbar attempt. This fight earned him the Performance of the Night award.

Klose faced Joaquim Silva on May 3, 2024, at UFC 301. He won the fight by unanimous decision.

Klose faced Joel Álvarez on December 14, 2024 at UFC on ESPN 63. He lost the fight by knockout via a flying knee and punches in the first round.

Klose faced Edson Barboza on August 16, 2025 at UFC 319. He won the fight via unanimous decision.

Klose faced Thomas Gantt on September 12, 2026 at UFC Fight Night 288. He lost the fight via a reverse triangle choke submission in the third round.

== Personal life ==
Klose has a son, Kingston (born 2018). He is dating a fellow UFC athlete Cortney Casey.

== Championships and accomplishments ==
- Ultimate Fighting Championship
  - Performance of the Night (Two times) vs. Brandon Jenkins and Joe Solecki
- Rage in the Cage
  - RITC Lightweight Championship (one time; former)

== Mixed martial arts record ==
Professional record breakdown
21 matches	16 wins	4 losses
By knockout	6	2
By submission	0	1
By decision	10	1
Draws	1	

Res.	Record	Opponent	Method	Event	Date	Round	Time	Location	Notes
Loss	16–4–1	Thomas Gantt	Submission (reverse triangle choke)	UFC Fight Night: Silva vs. Delgado	September 12, 2026	3	2:46	Glendale, Arizona, United States	
Win	16–3–1	Edson Barboza	Decision (unanimous)	UFC 319	August 16, 2025	3	5:00	Chicago, Illinois, United States	
Loss	15–3–1	Joel Álvarez	KO (flying knee and punches)	UFC on ESPN: Covington vs. Buckley	December 14, 2024	1	2:48	Tampa, Florida, United States	
Win	15–2–1	Joaquim Silva	Decision (unanimous)	UFC 301	May 4, 2024	3	5:00	Rio de Janeiro, Brazil	
Win	14–2–1	Joe Solecki	KO (slam)	UFC on ESPN: Dariush vs. Tsarukyan	December 2, 2023	1	1:41	Austin, Texas, United States	Performance of the Night.
Win	13–2–1	Rafa García	Decision (unanimous)	UFC 277	July 30, 2022	3	5:00	Dallas, Texas, United States	
Win	12–2–1	Brandon Jenkins	TKO (punches)	UFC on ESPN: Luque vs. Muhammad 2	April 16, 2022	2	0:33	Las Vegas, Nevada, United States	Performance of the Night.
Loss	11–2–1	Beneil Dariush	KO (punch)	UFC 248	March 7, 2020	2	1:00	Las Vegas, Nevada, United States	
Win	11–1–1	Christos Giagos	Decision (unanimous)	UFC 241	August 17, 2019	3	5:00	Anaheim, California, United States	
Win	10–1–1	Bobby Green	Decision (unanimous)	UFC on Fox: Lee vs. Iaquinta 2	December 15, 2018	3	5:00	Milwaukee, Wisconsin, United States	
Win	9–1–1	Lando Vannata	Decision (unanimous)	UFC 226	July 7, 2018	3	5:00	Las Vegas, Nevada, United States	
Loss	8–1–1	David Teymur	Decision (unanimous)	UFC 218	December 2, 2017	3	5:00	Detroit, Michigan, United States	
Win	8–0–1	Marc Diakiese	Decision (split)	The Ultimate Fighter: Redemption Finale	July 7, 2017	3	5:00	Las Vegas, Nevada, United States	
Win	7–0–1	Devin Powell	Decision (unanimous)	UFC Fight Night: Rodríguez vs. Penn	January 15, 2017	3	5:00	Phoenix, Arizona, United States	
Win	6–0–1	Hugh Pulley	Decision (unanimous)	RFA 44	September 30, 2016	3	5:00	St. Charles, Missouri, United States	
Draw	5–0–1	Joshua Avales	Draw (split)	Tachi Palace Fights 26	February 18, 2016	3	5:00	Lemoore, California, United States	
Win	5–0	Alejandro Garcia	TKO (punches)	World Fighting Federation 23	August 22, 2015	2	4:08	Chandler, Arizona, United States	
Win	4–0	Gabe Rodriguez	TKO (punches)	Rage in the Cage 178	June 6, 2015	1	0:31	Prescott Valley, Arizona, United States	Catchweight (160 lb) bout; Rodriguez missed weight.
Win	3–0	Preston Harris	Decision (unanimous)	Rage in the Cage 176	March 7, 2015	3	5:00	Phoenix, Arizona, United States	Won the Rage in the Cage Lightweight Championship.
Win	2–0	Jeff Fletcher	TKO (punches)	World Fighting Federation 17	November 22, 2014	2	3:43	Chandler, Arizona, United States	
Win	1–0	Nolan McLaughlin	TKO (punches)	Duel for Domination 7	April 5, 2014	1	3:10	Mesa, Arizona, United States	
