= UFC 306 =

2024 mixed martial event in Nevada, US

UFC 306: O'Malley vs. Dvalishvili
- The poster for UFC 306: O'Malley vs. Dvalishvili
- Promotion: Ultimate Fighting Championship
- Date: September 14, 2024
- Venue: Sphere
- City: Paradise, Nevada, United States
- Attendance: 16,024
- Total gate: $21,829,245

Event chronology
UFC Fight Night: Burns vs. Brady	UFC 306: O'Malley vs. Dvalishvili	UFC Fight Night: Moicano vs. Saint Denis

UFC 306: O'Malley vs. Dvalishvili (also known as Noche UFC 2 and branded as Riyadh Season Noche UFC for sponsorship reasons) was a mixed martial arts event produced by the Ultimate Fighting Championship that took place on September 14, 2024, at Sphere in Paradise, Nevada, part of the Las Vegas Valley, United States.

== Background ==
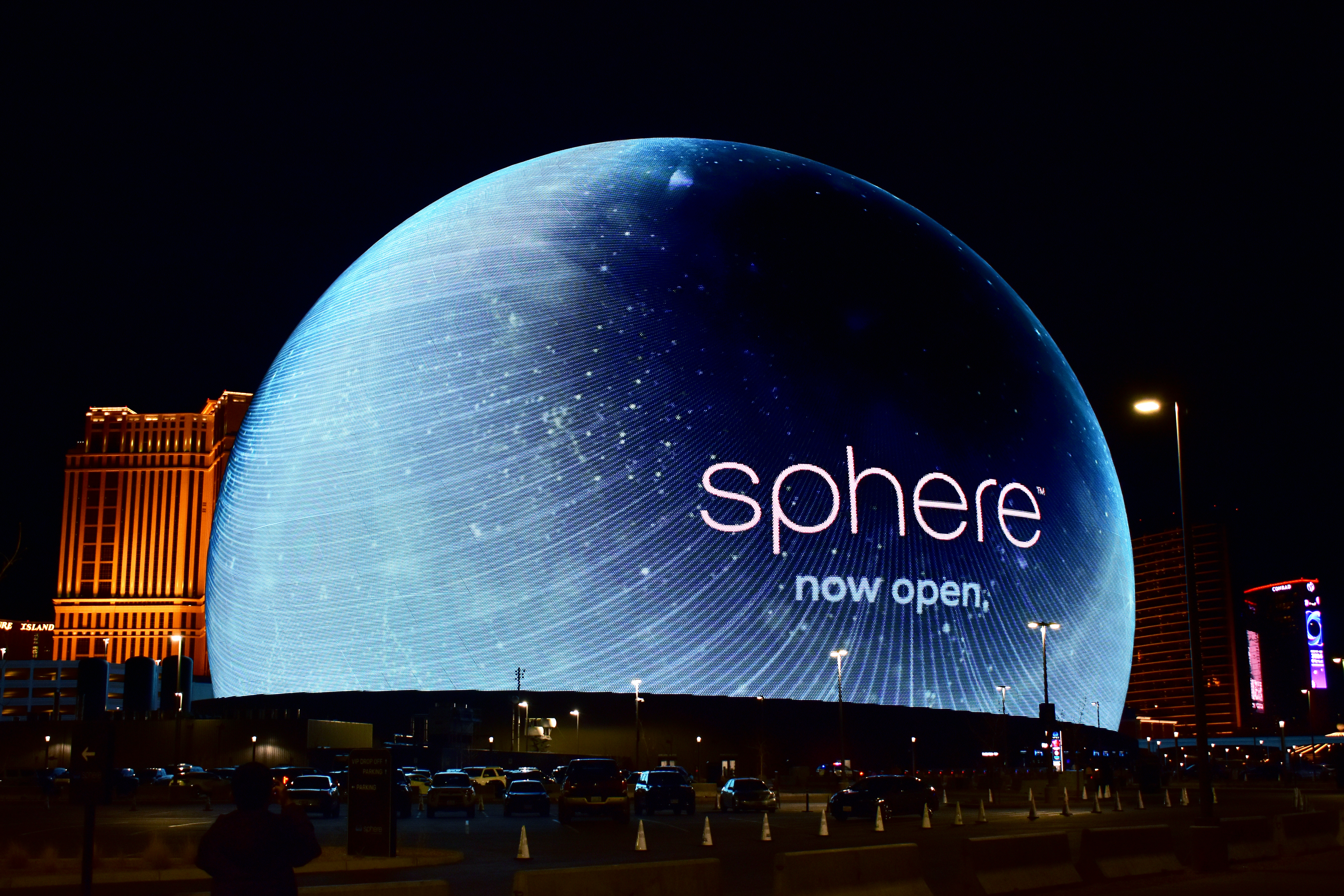
After hosting over 200 events in Las Vegas, this was the promotion's debut at Sphere, which opened in September 2023.

=== Production ===
UFC 306 was UFC's second event (after 2023's UFC Fight Night: Grasso vs. Shevchenko 2) to be held under the "Noche UFC" banner—a commemoration of Mexico's independence day in which all but one of the matches on the card (the main event between Sean O'Malley and Merab Dvalishvili) featured at least one fighter of Mexican or Mexican American descent. As UFC's usual Las Vegas venue T-Mobile Arena had already been booked by Canelo Álvarez for his independence day fight against Edgar Berlanga, UFC booked Sphere instead as a one-off event, marking the venue's first live sporting event.

UFC founder Dana White had previously attended a concert during U2's opening residency at Sphere and was impressed by the venue's technology, stating that UFC 306 planned to "take what U2 did and multiply it by a million." Television director Glenn Weiss and Mexican-American filmmaker Carlos López Estrada were brought on to oversee the production of the event, including the content that would be displayed on Sphere's 16K resolution video display. The main card was divided into six acts which chronicled the history of Mexico from the perspective of combat; each act consisted of a 90-second introductory vignette played before each match, and an accompanying "world" that served as a backdrop on the screen during the match.

The use of Sphere resulted in UFC 306 having a higher production cost of around $20 million, in comparison to the approximately $2 million that is spent on other UFC pay-per-view events. UFC would sell a title sponsorship to an event for the first time, in which UFC 306 was marketed as "Riyadh Season Noche UFC" under an agreement with Saudi Arabia's General Entertainment Authority. Due to the production costs, UFC's long-term agreement with T-Mobile Arena operator MGM Resorts International, and the circumstances that necessitated it, White stated that it was unlikely that UFC would host another Las Vegas event at Sphere, and referred to UFC 306 as an event that "[would] never be done again". However, he added that "if some new technology pops up, I guarantee you I will be first." UFC 306 would remain the promotion's most expensive event until 2026, when UFC Freedom 250 was estimated to have exceeded $60 million.

=== Fight card ===
A UFC Bantamweight Championship bout between current champion Sean O'Malley and Merab Dvalishvili headlined the event.

A UFC Women's Flyweight Championship trilogy bout between current champion Alexa Grasso and former champion Valentina Shevchenko took place at the co-main event. The pairing first met at UFC 285 in March 2023, where Grasso won the title by fourth round submission upset. Their second meeting took place at UFC Fight Night: Grasso vs. Shevchenko 2 in September 2023, which the bout ended by split draw. The pairing previously coached on The Ultimate Fighter: Team Grasso vs. Team Shevchenko against each other. Manon Fiorot served as backup and potential replacement for this fight.

A featherweight bout between former UFC Featherweight Championship challenger Brian Ortega and Diego Lopes took place at the event. The pair was previously expected to meet at UFC 303, but Ortega withdrew just hours before the bout due to illness.

A middleweight bout between former LFA Middleweight Champion Anthony Hernandez and Michel Pereira was scheduled for this event. However, the bout was moved to UFC Fight Night: Hernandez vs. Pereira to serve as the main event.

A flyweight bout between Édgar Cháirez and Kevin Borjas was scheduled for this event. However, Borjas withdrew from the fight for unknown reasons and was replaced by Joshua Van.

== Results ==
Main card
Weight class				Method	Round	Time	Notes
Bantamweight	Merab Dvalishvili	def.	Sean O'Malley (c)	Decision (unanimous) (49–46, 48–47, 48–47)	5	5:00	(Note: For the UFC Bantamweight Championship.)
Women's Flyweight	Valentina Shevchenko	def.	Alexa Grasso (c)	Decision (unanimous) (50–45, 50–45, 50–45)	5	5:00	(Note: For the UFC Women's Flyweight Championship.)
Featherweight	Diego Lopes	def.	Brian Ortega	Decision (unanimous) (30–26, 30–27, 30–27)	3	5:00
Lightweight	Esteban Ribovics	def.	Daniel Zellhuber	Decision (split) (29–28, 28–29, 29–28)	3	5:00
Flyweight	Ronaldo Rodríguez	def.	Ode' Osbourne	Decision (unanimous) (29–28, 29–27, 29–27)	3	5:00
Preliminary card (ESPNews / ESPN+)
Women's Bantamweight	Norma Dumont	def.	Irene Aldana	Decision (unanimous) (30–27, 30–27, 30–27)	3	5:00
Lightweight	Ignacio Bahamondes	def.	Manuel Torres	TKO (punches)	1	4:02
Women's Strawweight	Ketlen Souza	def.	Yazmin Jauregui	Technical Submission (rear-naked choke)	1	3:02
Flyweight	Joshua Van	def.	Édgar Cháirez	Decision (unanimous) (29–28, 29–28, 29–28)	3	5:00
Early preliminary card (ESPN+ / UFC Fight Pass)
Bantamweight	Raul Rosas Jr.	def.	Aori Qileng	Decision (unanimous) (29–28, 29–28, 29–28)	3	5:00

== Bonus awards ==
The following fighters received $50,000 bonuses.

- Fight of the Night: Esteban Ribovics vs. Daniel Zellhuber
- Performance of the Night: Ignacio Bahamondes and Ketlen Souza

== Records set ==
The event generated $21,829,245 in ticket receipts, which, at the time, broke the record for the biggest gate in UFC history surpassing UFC 205 (which previously held the record with a gate of $17,700,000). The number was later surpassed by UFC 329 in July 2026.

UFC 306 also now holds highest-grossing records for the following: sales for VIP experiences, merchandise sales at a UFC event, single event ticket sales at the Sphere venue, and sponsorship sales (based on the partnership with Riyadh Season).

== See also ==
- 2024 in UFC
- List of current UFC fighters
- List of UFC events
- Noche UFC
