= Waldo Cortes-Acosta =

Dominican mixed martial artist (born 1991)

- Born: October 3, 1991 (age 35); Fundación, Barahona Province, Dominican Republic
- Other names: Salsa Boy
- Height: 6 ft 4 in (193 cm)
- Weight: 264 lb (120 kg; 18 st 12 lb)
- Division: Heavyweight
- Reach: 78 in (198 cm)
- Fighting out of: Phoenix, Arizona, U.S.
- Team: Ultimate Kombat Training Center
- Trainer: Javier Torres
- Rank: Blue belt in Brazilian jiu-jitsu
- Years active: 2018–present

Professional boxing record
- Total: 10
- Wins: 6
- By knockout: 3
- Losses: 4
- By knockout: 3

Mixed martial arts record
- Total: 22
- Wins: 17
- By knockout: 9
- By submission: 1
- By decision: 7
- Losses: 5
- By knockout: 1
- By decision: 4

Other information
- Boxing record from BoxRec
- Mixed martial arts record from Sherdog

Waldo Cortes-Acosta (born October 3, 1991) is a Dominican professional mixed martial artist and professional boxer. He currently competes in the Heavyweight division of the Ultimate Fighting Championship (UFC). A professional since 2018, Cortes-Acosta competed in the LFA, where he was the heavyweight champion and subsequently earned his UFC contract on Dana White's Contender Series, winning by first-round TKO. As of November 7, 2026, he is #12 in the Meta UFC heavyweight rankings.

== Background ==
Cortés Acosta is originally from Barahona, Dominican Republic, and initially pursued a career in baseball before becoming a professional mixed martial artist. He began playing baseball in his native Dominican Republic at a young age and eventually moved to the United States to continue pursuing the sport professionally. He later became a professional baseball player, but his career was cut short after suffering an elbow injury that required surgery.

Following the end of his baseball career, Cortés Acosta found a new path in combat sports. At the age of 24, he began training in boxing and mixed martial arts, relatively late compared with many fighters who start martial arts during childhood. Despite this late start and having no extensive background in wrestling or grappling, he quickly developed an interest in MMA and began dedicating himself to improving his striking, conditioning, and overall fighting skills. His athletic background in baseball, particularly as a pitcher, would later contribute to the power and mechanics of his punching.

== Mixed martial arts career ==
=== Early career ===
Cortes-Acosta trained at the Tristar Gym alongside Georges St-Pierre and started off with two victories in professional MMA.

Cortes-Acosta faced Muhammed DeReese on November 12, 2021, at Bellator 271. He won the bout by unanimous decision.

In his last bout before DWCS, Cortes-Acosta faced Thomas Petersen for the LFA Heavyweight Championship on April 15, 2022, at LFA 129. He won the bout by TKO in the third round.

=== Dana White's Contender Series ===
On August 2, 2022, Cortes-Acosta faced Danilo Suzart for a UFC contract a Week 2 of Season 6 of Dana White's Contender Series on August 2, 2022. He won the fight via first-round TKO and was awarded a contract by Dana White.

=== Ultimate Fighting Championship ===
After earning his contract, Cortes-Acosta made his UFC debut at UFC Fight Night 213 against Jared Vanderaa on October 29, 2022. He won the fight via unanimous decision.

Cortes-Acosta faced Chase Sherman on November 19, 2022, at UFC Fight Night 215. He won the fight via unanimous decision.

Cortes-Acosta faced Marcos Rogério de Lima on April 29, 2023, at UFC on ESPN 45. He lost the fight via unanimous decision.

Cortes-Acosta faced Łukasz Brzeski on August 26, 2023, at UFC Fight Night 225. He won the fight via KO in the first round.

Cortes-Acosta faced Andrei Arlovski on January 13, 2024, at UFC Fight Night 234. He won the bout by unanimous decision.

Cortes-Acosta faced Robelis Despaigne on May 11, 2024, at UFC on ESPN 56. He won the fight by unanimous decision.

Cortes-Acosta was scheduled to face Chris Barnett on October 12, 2024, at UFC Fight Night 244. However, Cortes-Acosta withdrew from the fight for unknown reasons and was replaced by Junior Tafa.

Cortes-Acosta faced former LFA Light Heavyweight Champion Ryan Spann on March 15, 2025, at UFC Fight Night 254. He won the fight by knockout in the second round.

Cortes-Acosta faced Serghei Spivac on June 7, 2025, at UFC 316, replacing an injured Shamil Gaziev. He won the fight by unanimous decision. 10 out of 13 media outlets scored the bout for Spivac.

Cortes-Acosta faced former interim UFC Heavyweight Championship challenger Sergei Pavlovich on August 23, 2025, at UFC Fight Night 257. He lost the fight by unanimous decision.

Cortes-Acosta faced Ante Delija on November 1, 2025, at UFC Fight Night 263. In the first round, the fight was briefly halted due to an eye poke, initially resulting in a mistaken technical knockout win for Delija. After video review, the bout resumed, and Cortes-Acosta won shortly after by knockout. This fight earned him his first Performance of the Night award.

Replacing Serghei Spivac on two days' notice, Cortes-Acosta faced Shamil Gaziev on November 22, 2025, at UFC Fight Night 265. He won the fight by knockout in the first round. This fight earned him another Performance of the Night award.

Cortes-Acosta faced former UFC Heavyweight Championship challenger Derrick Lewis on January 24, 2026, at UFC 324. He won the fight via technical knockout in round two.

Cortes-Acosta faced Alexander Volkov on May 9, 2026, at UFC 328. He lost the fight by unanimous decision.

Cortes-Acosta was scheduled to face Curtis Blaydes on September 19, 2026, at UFC 331. However, the bout was shifted to one week prior to September 12, 2026, at UFC Fight Night 288. Cortes-Acosta lost the fight by unanimous decision.

Cortes-Acosta faced Johnny Walker on November 7, 2026 at UFC Fight Night 293, after the original welterweight main event between Sean Brady and Gabriel Bonfim was cancelled due to Brady's injury. He lost the fight by technical knockout via a head kick and punches in the third round. This fight earned him a $100,000 Fight of the Night award.

== Championships and accomplishments ==
- Ultimate Fighting Championship
  - Fight of the Night (One time) vs. Johnny Walker
  - Performance of the Night (Two times) vs. Ante Delija and Shamil Gaziev
  - Tied for most bouts in a calendar year in UFC history (5 in 2025)
  - UFC.com Awards
    - 2025: Ranked #4 Fighter of the Year
- Legacy Fighting Alliance
  - LFA Heavyweight Championship (One time)
- MMA Fighting
  - 2025 Fantasy League MVP
  - 2025 #2 Ranked Breakthrough Fighter of the Year
  - 2025 First Team MMA All-Star
- Uncrowned
  - 2025 #3 Ranked Breakthrough Fighter of the Year

== Mixed martial arts record ==
Professional record breakdown
| 22 matches | 17 wins | 5 losses |
| By knockout | 9 | 1 |
| By submission | 1 | 0 |
| By decision | 7 | 4 |

| Res. | Record | Opponent | Method | Event | Date | Round | Time | Location | Notes |
|---|---|---|---|---|---|---|---|---|---|
| Loss | 17–5 | Johnny Walker | TKO (punches) | UFC Fight Night: Cortes-Acosta vs. Walker | November 7, 2026 | 3 | 2:27 | Las Vegas, Nevada, United States | Fight of the Night. |
| Loss | 17–4 | Curtis Blaydes | Decision (unanimous) | UFC Fight Night: Silva vs. Delgado | September 12, 2026 | 3 | 5:00 | Glendale, Arizona, United States | |
| Loss | 17–3 | Alexander Volkov | Decision (unanimous) | UFC 328 | May 9, 2026 | 3 | 5:00 | Newark, New Jersey, United States | |
| Win | 17–2 | Derrick Lewis | TKO (punches) | UFC 324 | January 24, 2026 | 2 | 3:14 | Las Vegas, Nevada, United States | |
| Win | 16–2 | Shamil Gaziev | KO (punch) | UFC Fight Night: Tsarukyan vs. Hooker | November 22, 2025 | 1 | 1:22 | Al Rayyan, Qatar | Performance of the Night. |
| Win | 15–2 | Ante Delija | KO (punches) | UFC Fight Night: Garcia vs. Onama | November 1, 2025 | 1 | 3:59 | Las Vegas, Nevada, United States | Performance of the Night. |
| Loss | 14–2 | Sergei Pavlovich | Decision (unanimous) | UFC Fight Night: Walker vs. Zhang | August 23, 2025 | 3 | 5:00 | Shanghai, China | |
| Win | 14–1 | Serghei Spivac | Decision (unanimous) | UFC 316 | June 7, 2025 | 3 | 5:00 | Newark, New Jersey, United States | |
| Win | 13–1 | Ryan Spann | TKO (punches) | UFC Fight Night: Vettori vs. Dolidze 2 | March 15, 2025 | 2 | 4:48 | Las Vegas, Nevada, United States | |
| Win | 12–1 | Robelis Despaigne | Decision (unanimous) | UFC on ESPN: Lewis vs. Nascimento | May 11, 2024 | 3 | 5:00 | St. Louis, Missouri, United States | |
| Win | 11–1 | Andrei Arlovski | Decision (unanimous) | UFC Fight Night: Ankalaev vs. Walker 2 | January 13, 2024 | 3 | 5:00 | Las Vegas, Nevada, United States | |
| Win | 10–1 | Łukasz Brzeski | KO (punches) | UFC Fight Night: Holloway vs. The Korean Zombie | August 26, 2023 | 1 | 3:01 | Kallang, Singapore | |
| Loss | 9–1 | Marcos Rogério de Lima | Decision (unanimous) | UFC on ESPN: Song vs. Simón | April 29, 2023 | 3 | 5:00 | Las Vegas, Nevada, United States | |
| Win | 9–0 | Chase Sherman | Decision (unanimous) | UFC Fight Night: Nzechukwu vs. Cuțelaba | November 19, 2022 | 3 | 5:00 | Las Vegas, Nevada, United States | |
| Win | 8–0 | Jared Vanderaa | Decision (unanimous) | UFC Fight Night: Kattar vs. Allen | October 29, 2022 | 3 | 5:00 | Las Vegas, Nevada, United States | |
| Win | 7–0 | Danilo Suzart | TKO (punches) | Dana White's Contender Series 48 | August 2, 2022 | 1 | 3:40 | Las Vegas, Nevada, United States | |
| Win | 6–0 | Thomas Petersen | TKO (punches) | LFA 129 | April 15, 2022 | 3 | 4:53 | Prior Lake, Minnesota, United States | Won the LFA Heavyweight Championship. |
| Win | 5–0 | Derrick Weaver | TKO (punches) | LFA 124 | February 11, 2022 | 2 | 0:22 | Phoenix, Arizona, United States | |
| Win | 4–0 | Muhammed DeReese | Decision (unanimous) | Bellator 271 | November 12, 2021 | 3 | 5:00 | Hollywood, Florida, United States | |
| Win | 3–0 | Jordan Powell | Decision (unanimous) | RUF 43 | August 29, 2021 | 3 | 5:00 | Phoenix, Arizona, United States | Road to ONE Heavyweight Tournament Quarterfinal. |
| Win | 2–0 | Edison Lopes | Submission (kimura) | RUF 42 | July 31, 2021 | 1 | 3:12 | Phoenix, Arizona, United States | Road to ONE Heavyweight Tournament First Round. |
| Win | 1–0 | Odell Pantin | KO (punch) | Iron Boy MMA 11 | May 19, 2018 | 2 | 1:23 | Phoenix, Arizona, United States | Heavyweight debut. |

== Professional boxing record ==
| 10 fights | 6 wins | 4 losses |
|---|---|---|
| By knockout | 2 | 3 |
| By decision | 4 | 1 |

| No. | Result | Record | Opponent | Type | Round, time | Date | Location | Notes |
|---|---|---|---|---|---|---|---|---|
| 10 | Loss | 6–4 | Sonny Conto | KO | 1 (4), 1:41 | Apr 10, 2021 | Osage Casino, Tulsa, Oklahoma, U.S. | |
| 9 | Win | 6–3 | Daviante Jones | UD | 4 | Oct 29, 2020 | WestWorld, Scottsdale, Arizona, U.S. | |
| 8 | Loss | 5–3 | Kingsley Ibeh | TKO | 4 (6), 1:41 | Jun 25, 2020 | MGM Grand Conference Center, Paradise, Nevada, U.S. | |
| 7 | Win | 5–2 | Kingsley Ibeh | SD | 4 | Oct 12, 2019 | Wild Horse Pass Hotel & Casino, Chandler, Arizona, U.S. | |
| 6 | Win | 4–2 | Chad Davis | TKO | 3 (6), 2:02 | Jul 27, 2019 | Celebrity Theatre, Phoenix, Arizona, U.S. | |
| 5 | Win | 3–2 | Dale Sopi | UD | 4 | Apr 27, 2019 | Celebrity Theatre, Phoenix, Arizona, U.S. | |
| 4 | Loss | 2–2 | Dante Stone | SD | 4 | Aug 11, 2018 | Celebrity Theatre, Phoenix, Arizona, U.S. | |
| 3 | Win | 2–1 | Dante Stone | UD | 4 | Feb 24, 2018 | Celebrity Theatre, Phoenix, Arizona, U.S. | |
| 2 | Win | 1–1 | Ruben Rivera | TKO | 3 (4), 2:41 | Oct 14, 2017 | Celebrity Theatre, Phoenix, Arizona, U.S. | |
| 1 | Loss | 0–1 | Adam Stewart | TKO | 1 (4), 2:58 | Jun 1, 2017 | Camelback Resort, Scottsdale, Arizona, U.S. | |

== See also ==
- List of current UFC fighters
- List of Dana White's Contender Series alumni
- List of male mixed martial artists
