= UFC Fight Night: Lopes vs. Silva =

Mixed martial arts event in 2025

Noche UFC: Lopes vs. Silva
- The poster for Noche UFC: Lopes vs. Silva
- Promotion: Ultimate Fighting Championship
- Date: September 13, 2025
- Venue: Frost Bank Center
- City: San Antonio, Texas, United States
- Attendance: 18,005
- Total gate: $3,586,669

Event chronology
UFC Fight Night: Imavov vs. Borralho	Noche UFC: Lopes vs. Silva	UFC Fight Night: Ulberg vs. Reyes

Noche UFC: Lopes vs. Silva (also known as UFC Fight Night 259, Noche UFC 3 and UFC on ESPN+ 117) was a mixed martial arts event produced by the Ultimate Fighting Championship that took place on September 13, 2025, at the Frost Bank Center in San Antonio, Texas, United States.

== Background ==
The event marked the promotion's fourth visit to San Antonio and first since UFC on ESPN: Vera vs. Sandhagen in March 2023.

It was the third annual "Noche UFC" event commemorating Mexico's independence day, following September 2023's UFC Fight Night: Grasso vs. Shevchenko 2 and September 2024's UFC 306. The card was originally expected to take place in Guadalajara, Mexico and serve as UFC 320, but it was moved to San Antonio (and shifted to a Fight Night event) due to the construction of Arena Guadalajara being stalled.

A featherweight bout between former UFC Featherweight Championship challenger Diego Lopes and Jean Silva headlined the event.

Rob Font and Raul Rosas Jr. were scheduled to meet in a bantamweight bout in the co-main event. However, Rosas Jr. withdrew due to a rib injury and was replaced by David Martínez. Martínez was originally expected to face Carlos Vera at this event, before the latter withdrew and was replaced by Quang Le. Following Martínez's reassignment to the co-main event, Le was matched with promotional newcomer Santiago Luna.

A women's strawweight bout between former UFC Women's Strawweight Championship challengers Amanda Lemos and Tatiana Suarez (also The Ultimate Fighter: Team Joanna vs. Team Cláudia strawweight winner) took place at this event. They were originally scheduled to meet at UFC 298 in February 2024, but Suarez withdrew from the event due to an injury.

Sedriques Dumas and Zachary Reese met in a middleweight bout at the event. They were originally scheduled to meet at UFC 311 in January, but Dumas withdrew from the event for unknown reasons.

Édgar Cháirez was expected to face Alessandro Costa in a flyweight bout at the event. However, Cháirez pulled out in late July due to a broken leg and was replaced by Alden Coria.

A women's bantamweight bout between former UFC Women's Bantamweight Champion Raquel Pennington and Norma Dumont was scheduled for this event. However, Pennington had to withdraw due to an undisclosed injury, so the bout was removed from the card.

The welterweight final of The Ultimate Fighter: Team Cormier vs. Team Sonnen between Rodrigo Sezinando and Daniil Donchenko took place at the event. They were initially scheduled to compete at UFC 319 one month before, but the bout was shifted to this card due to an injury suffered from Sezinando's side.

At the weigh-ins, former interim UFC Middleweight Championship challenger (also The Ultimate Fighter: Team Jones vs. Team Sonnen middleweight winner) Kelvin Gastelum weighed in at 191 pounds, five pounds over the middleweight non-title fight limit. The bout proceeded at catchweight and he was fined 35 percent of his purse which went to his opponent Dustin Stoltzfus.

== Results ==
Main card (ESPN+)
Weight class				Method	Round	Time	Notes
Featherweight	Diego Lopes	def.	Jean Silva	TKO (spinning back elbow and punches)	2	4:48
Bantamweight	David Martínez	def.	Rob Font	Decision (unanimous) (29–28, 29–28, 29–28)	3	5:00
Lightweight	Rafa García	def.	Jared Gordon	TKO (elbows)	3	2:27
Catchweight (191 lb)	Kelvin Gastelum	def.	Dustin Stoltzfus	Decision (unanimous) (30–27, 29–28, 29–28)	3	5:00
Lightweight	Alexander Hernandez	def.	Carlos Diego Ferreira	TKO (punches)	2	3:46
Bantamweight	Santiago Luna	def.	Quang Le	KO (punches)	1	2:48
Preliminary card (ESPN+)
Middleweight	Duško Todorović	def.	José Medina	Submission (rear-naked choke)	1	4:21
Lightweight	Joaquim Silva	def.	Claudio Puelles	Decision (split) (29–28, 28–29, 29–28)	3	5:00
Women's Strawweight	Tatiana Suarez	def.	Amanda Lemos	Decision (unanimous) (29–28, 29–28, 29–28)	3	5:00
Flyweight	Jesús Santos Aguilar	def.	Luis Gurule	Decision (unanimous) (30–27, 29–28, 29–28)	3	5:00
Middleweight	Zachary Reese	vs.	Sedriques Dumas	No Contest (accidental groin kick)	1	0:51	(Note: Accidental groin strike rendered Dumas unable to continue.)
Flyweight	Alden Coria	def.	Alessandro Costa	TKO (punches)	3	0:47
Women's Bantamweight	Montserrat Rendon	def.	Alice Pereira	Decision (split) (28–29, 29–28, 30–27)	3	5:00
Welterweight	Daniil Donchenko	def.	Rodrigo Sezinando	TKO (punches)	1	4:27	(Note: The Ultimate Fighter 33 welterweight tournament final.)

== Bonus awards ==
The following fighters received $50,000 bonuses.

- Fight of the Night: Diego Lopes vs. Jean Silva
- Performance of the Night: Diego Lopes and Santiago Luna

== See also ==
- 2025 in UFC
- List of current UFC fighters
- List of UFC events
- Noche UFC
