= David Martínez (fighter) =

Mexican mixed martial artist and surgeon (born 1998)

- Born: Miguel David Aceves Martínez; August 3, 1998 (age 28); Ecatepec de Morelos, State of Mexico, Mexico
- Other names: Black Spartan; Doctor
- Height: 5 ft 6 in (1.68 m)
- Weight: 135 lb (61 kg; 9 st 9 lb)
- Division: Bantamweight
- Fighting out of: Mexico City, Mexico
- Team: Bonebreakers MMA
- Rank: Black belt in Karate; Black belt in kickboxing Purple belt in Brazilian Jiu-Jitsu
- Years active: 2016–present

Mixed martial arts record
- Total: 16
- Wins: 15
- By knockout: 10
- By decision: 5
- Losses: 1
- By decision: 1

Other information
- Notable relatives: Melissa Martínez (sister)
- Mixed martial arts record from Sherdog

Miguel David Aceves Martínez (born August 3, 1998) is a Mexican professional mixed martial artist and doctor who currently competes in the Bantamweight division of Ultimate Fighting Championship (UFC). As of June 20, 2026, he is #7 in the Meta UFC bantamweight rankings.

== Early life ==
Martínez was born on August 3, 1998, in Ecatepec de Morelos, State of Mexico. However, due to the local insecurity, he moved to Mexico City as a child. In his teens, he became interested in mixed martial arts, joining the Bonebreakers MMA Team with his older sister, Melissa. Their father, Ricardo Martínez Ramírez, in addition to coaching David since he was twelve, has coached the Mexican national kickboxing team.

== Mixed martial arts career ==
=== Combate Americas/Global ===
In 2018, Martínez signed with Combate Americas, later renamed Combate Global. There he suffered the first defeat of his career, at the hands of Gianni Vázquez on April 9, 2021 in Combate Global: Chairez vs. Monterroso.

After Gustavo Lopez vacated his Bantamweight Championship, the promotion created a tournament to crown a new champion, with Martínez among the contenders. On May 29, 2021, Martínez defeated Alejandro González by first-round TKO in the quarterfinals, and then Alan Cantú by unanimous decision in the semifinals.

==== CG Bantamweight Championship ====
In the tournament final, held on the same date, he challenged then-bantamweight champion Francisco Rivera. With a knockout 17 seconds into the second round, Martínez became the bantamweight champion.

In his first title defense, Martínez faced Arturo Vergara on May 27, 2022. He won the fight via TKO in the first round.

Martínez faced Axel Osuna on October 7, 2022, winning again by TKO to retain the title, this time in the fourth round.

Martínez faced Jose Zarauz on May 28, 2023. With an incredible roundhouse kick in the fourth round, he successfully retained the title for the third time. He later left the company.

=== Dana White's Contender Series ===
Martínez competed in Week 8 of Dana White's Contender Series Season 8 for a UFC contract, facing Xavier Franklin on October 1, 2024. He earned a unanimous decision victory and was one of five new signings to the promotion.

=== Ultimate Fighting Championship ===
Martínez made his UFC debut on March 29, 2025, at UFC on ESPN 64, where he faced Saimon Oliveira. With a pair of knees and punches, he won the fight in the first round. This victory earned him Performance of the Night honors.

Martínez was scheduled to face Carlos Vera on September 13, 2025, at UFC Fight Night 259, but the fight was canceled for unknown reasons, and his place was taken by Quang Le. However, this latter fight was also canceled due to Martínez being removed from the co-main event, where he will face Rob Font. David won the fight by unanimous decision.

Martínez faced Marlon Vera on February 28, 2026, at UFC Fight Night 268. He won the fight by unanimous decision.

Martínez was scheduled to face former UFC Bantamweight Championship challenger Umar Nurmagomedov on July 25, 2026 at UFC Fight Night 282. However, Martínez withdrew from the bout due to an injury.

Martínez faced Dan Ige on September 12, 2026 at UFC Fight Night 288. He won the fight by unanimous decision.

== Personal life ==
Outside of his role as a MMA fighter, David also holds a bachelor's degree, having studied medicine at the National Autonomous University of Mexico and the Mexican Social Security Institute. For this reason, he has left behind his nickname "Black Spartan" in favor of "Doctor Vergazos." (Note: In Mexican Spanish, the word "vergazos" is used to refer to punches.)

== Championships and accomplishments ==
- Ultimate Fighting Championship
  - Performance of the Night (One time) vs. Saimon Oliveira
  - UFC.com Awards
    - 2025: Ranked #4 Newcomer of the Year
- Combate Global
  - Combate Global Bantamweight Championship (one time)
  - Combate Global Bantamweight Tournament

== Mixed martial arts record ==
Professional record breakdown
16 matches	15 wins	1 loss
By knockout	10	0
By decision	5	1

Res.	Record	Opponent	Method	Event	Date	Round	Time	Location	Notes
Win	15–1	Dan Ige	Decision (unanimous)	UFC Fight Night: Silva vs. Delgado	September 12, 2026	3	5:00	Glendale, Arizona, United States	
Win	14–1	Marlon Vera	Decision (unanimous)	UFC Fight Night: Moreno vs. Kavanagh	February 28, 2026	3	5:00	Mexico City, Mexico	
Win	13–1	Rob Font	Decision (unanimous)	UFC Fight Night: Lopes vs. Silva	September 13, 2025	3	5:00	San Antonio, Texas, United States	
Win	12–1	Saimon Oliveira	TKO (knee and punches)	UFC on ESPN: Moreno vs. Erceg	March 29, 2025	1	4:38	Mexico City, Mexico	Performance of the Night.
Win	11–1	Xavier Franklin	Decision (unanimous)	Dana White's Contender Series 74	October 1, 2024	3	5:00	Las Vegas, Nevada, United States	
Win	10–1	Jose Zarauz	KO (spinning wheel kick)	Combate Global: Martínez vs. Zarauz	May 28, 2023	4	4:17	Miami, Florida, United States	Defended the Combate Bantamweight Championship.
Win	9–1	Axel Osuna	TKO (punches)	Combate Global: Martínez vs. Osuna	October 7, 2022	4	4:14	Miami, Florida, United States	Defended the Combate Bantamweight Championship.
Win	8–1	Arturo Vergara	TKO (punches)	Combate Global: Martínez vs. Vergara	May 27, 2022	1	2:08	Miami, Florida, United States	Non-title bout.
Win	7–1	Francisco Rivera	KO (head kick and punches)	Combate Global: Bantamweight Tournament	May 29, 2021	2	0:17	Miami, Florida, United States	Won the 2021 Combate Bantamweight Tournament and the vacant Combate Bantamweight Championship.
Win	6–1	Alan Cantú	Decision (unanimous)	Combate Global: Bantamweight Tournament	May 29, 2021	3	5:00	Miami, Florida, United States	2021 Combate Bantamweight Tournament Semifinal.
Win	5–1	Alejandro González	TKO (punches)	Combate Global: Bantamweight Tournament	May 29, 2021	1	1:50	Miami, Florida, United States	2021 Combate Bantamweight Tournament Quarterfinal.
Loss	4–1	Gianni Vázquez	Decision (split)	Combate Global: Cháirez vs. Monterroso	April 9, 2021	3	5:00	Miami, Florida, United States	
Win	4–0	William Sánchez	TKO (punches)	Combate Americas 38	March 31, 2019	1	0:56	Lima, Peru	
Win	3–0	Enrique Barragán	KO (punch)	Combate Americas 21	April 20, 2018	1	1:10	Monterrey, Mexico	
Win	2–0	Josue López	KO (punch)	Ultimate Combat Challenge 30	July 23, 2016	1	2:50	Guatemala City, Guatemala	
Win	1–0	Erick Espita Garcia	TKO (punches)	Xtreme Kombat 31	February 20, 2016	2	2:11	Mexico City, Mexico	Bantamweight debut.

== See also ==
- List of current UFC fighters
- List of Dana White's Contender Series alumni
- List of male mixed martial artists
- List of Mexican UFC fighters
