= Noche UFC =

Mixed martial arts events featuring Mexico

Noche UFC is a series of Ultimate Fighting Championship (UFC) mixed martial arts events. Held on or near Mexico's Independence Day (September 16) since 2023, the events features a variety of Mexican fighters and those foreign fighters with Mexican ancestry.

Since the establishment of the branding, almost all Noche UFC events have been UFC Fight Night cards. An exception occurred in 2024, when Noche UFC was held as part of UFC 306, with a one-off hosting of the event at Sphere in Las Vegas. Noche UFC returned in 2025, being held as part of a UFC Fight Night card in San Antonio; it was originally scheduled to be hosted by Guadalajara, Mexico as UFC 320, but was relocated to San Antonio as a Fight Night card after its intended venue was delayed.

== History ==
Traditionally, Las Vegas had hosted important boxing matches featuring Mexican fighters competing on or around September 16th, as part of the fiestas patrias held in Mexico during the ninth month of the year. This gave UFC president Dana White the idea to do something similar in the MMA arena, stating that "UFC Night will seek to honor the history of combat sports in Mexico." With both events coinciding in date, White also mentioned that UFC Night would enter into a television ratings battle alongside the fights of boxer Canelo Álvarez.

UFC Fight Night 227, held on September 16 in Glendale, Arizona, was the first to bear the promotional name Noche UFC. Alexa Grasso, the first Mexican woman champion in the organization, made her first defense of the women's flyweight championship against former champion Valentina Shevchenko, whom she had previously defeated in March.

Citing the success of the event, White announced in November 2023 that Noche UFC would return in September 2024, and be hosted by the Sphere in Las Vegas; he stated that he planned for it to be "the greatest live combat sports show anybody has ever seen". Noche UFC 2—held as UFC 306— took place on September 14, 2024; the co-main events featured a trilogy fight between Grasso and Shevchenko for the women's flyweight championship, and a match between Sean O'Malley and Merab Dvalishvili for the bantamweight championship.

"Noche UFC 3" was planned to take place in Guadalajara, Jalisco as UFC 320. As construction of its planned venue Arena Guadalajara was delayed, the event was relocated to San Antonio, Texas as UFC Fight Night: Lopes vs. Silva, and UFC 320 was moved to October 2025 and held in Las Vegas instead.

The fourth edition of Noche UFC took place on September 12, 2026, as UFC Fight Night: Rodríguez vs. Silva, with Silva once again headlining the card in a bout against Yair Rodríguez.

== Events ==
Name	Event	Date	Venue	Ref.
Noche UFC 4	UFC Fight Night: Silva vs. Delgado	September 12, 2026	Desert Diamond Arena	
Noche UFC 3	UFC Fight Night: Lopes vs. Silva	September 13, 2025	Frost Bank Center	
Noche UFC 2	UFC 306: O'Malley vs. Dvalishvili	September 14, 2024	Sphere	
Noche UFC 1	UFC Fight Night: Grasso vs. Shevchenko 2	September 16, 2023	T-Mobile Arena	

== See also ==
- Fight Island
