= UFC 324 =

Mixed martial arts event in 2026

UFC 324: Gaethje vs. Pimblett
- The poster for UFC 324: Gaethje vs. Pimblett
- Promotion: Ultimate Fighting Championship
- Date: January 24, 2026
- Venue: T-Mobile Arena
- City: Paradise, Nevada, United States
- Attendance: 19,481
- Total gate: $10,951,166

Event chronology
| UFC on ESPN: Royval vs. Kape | UFC 324: Gaethje vs. Pimblett | UFC 325: Volkanovski vs. Lopes 2 |

UFC 324: Gaethje vs. Pimblett was a mixed martial arts event produced by the Ultimate Fighting Championship that took place on January 24, 2026, at the T-Mobile Arena in Paradise, Nevada, part of the Las Vegas Valley, United States.

== Background ==
This event was the first UFC broadcast under the new media rights agreement with Paramount Skydance, following the conclusion of their deal with ESPN. The deal has already expanded to include Latin America and Australia, as all the events will be available to stream at no additional cost on Paramount+ (including numbered events), with select cards appearing on CBS. It also marked the first numbered event to not air on pay-per-view in the United States since UFC 267 in 2021.

An interim UFC Lightweight Championship bout between former interim champion (also former WSOF Lightweight Champion) Justin Gaethje and Paddy Pimblett headlined the event. Current champion (also former UFC Featherweight Champion) Ilia Topuria announced that he would not be competing in the first quarter of 2026 due to personal reasons relating to his wife at the time.

A UFC Women's Bantamweight Championship bout between the reigning champion Kayla Harrison (who is also a 2012 and 2016 Olympic gold medalist in judo; and a two-time PFL women's lightweight tournament champion) and former two-time champion Amanda Nunes, who also held the UFC Women's Featherweight Championship, was originally scheduled to serve as the co-main event. Nunes, who is widely considered the greatest women's fighter in UFC history, was supposed to return for her first bout since UFC 289 in June 2023, where she announced her retirement following a successful title defense against Irene Aldana. However, Harrison withdrew from the bout after being diagnosed with herniated discs in her neck, which required surgery. The fight was later rescheduled for UFC 334.

Former UFC Women's Flyweight Champion Alexa Grasso and former two-time UFC Women's Strawweight Champion Rose Namajunas were expected to meet in a flyweight bout at the event. However, Grasso pulled out on December 3 due to injury and was replaced by Natália Silva.

At the weigh-ins, two fighters missed weight:

- Former two-time UFC Flyweight Champion Deiveson Figueiredo weighed in at 138.5 pounds, two and a half pounds over the bantamweight non-title fight limit.
- Former flyweight title challenger Alex Perez weighed in at 128.5 pounds, two and a half pounds over the flyweight non-title fight limit.

Figueiredo and Perez's bouts proceeded at catchweight. Both fighters were fined 25 percent of their individual purses which went to their opponents former UFC Bantamweight Championship challenger Umar Nurmagomedov and Charles Johnson, respectively.

Also at the weigh-ins, Cameron Smotherman made weight for his bantamweight contest against The Return of The Ultimate Fighter: Team Volkanovski vs. Team Ortega bantamweight winner Ricky Turcios, but collapsed moments after stepping off the scale. The bout was subsequently canceled. It is not yet known if Turcios will be paid his win money, in addition to his show money, as he made weight as scheduled.

A lightweight bout between Michael Johnson and Alexander Hernandez was originally scheduled for this event. However, the fight was canceled on the day of the event, with the promotion giving no official reason. The cancellation followed notable betting‑line movement on the matchup, and it was reported that some observers speculated Hernandez may have been dealing with an injury. UFC CEO and president Dana White later confirmed that the fight had been pulled from the card due to betting concerns.

During the event's broadcast, former two-time UFC Bantamweight Champion (also former WEC Bantamweight Champion) Dominick Cruz was announced as the next "modern wing" UFC Hall of Fame inductee during International Fight Week festivities in Las Vegas this summer.

== Results ==
Main card (Paramount+)
| Weight class | | | | Method | Round | Time | Notes |
|---|---|---|---|---|---|---|---|
| Lightweight | Justin Gaethje | def. | Paddy Pimblett | Decision (unanimous) (48–47, 49–46, 49–46) | 5 | 5:00 | (Note: For the interim UFC Lightweight Championship.) |
| Bantamweight | Sean O'Malley | def. | Song Yadong | Decision (unanimous) (29–28, 29–28, 29–28) | 3 | 5:00 |
| Heavyweight | Waldo Cortes-Acosta | def. | Derrick Lewis | TKO (punches) | 2 | 3:14 |
| Women's Flyweight | Natália Silva | def. | Rose Namajunas | Decision (unanimous) (29–28, 29–28, 29–28) | 3 | 5:00 |
| Featherweight | Jean Silva | def. | Arnold Allen | Decision (unanimous) (30–27, 29–28, 29–28) | 3 | 5:00 |
Preliminary card (Paramount+)
| Catchweight (138.5 lb) | Umar Nurmagomedov | def. | Deiveson Figueiredo | Decision (unanimous) (30–27, 30–27, 30–27) | 3 | 5:00 |
| Middleweight | Ateba Gautier | def. | Andrey Pulyaev | Decision (unanimous) (30–27, 29–28, 29–28) | 3 | 5:00 |
| Light Heavyweight | Nikita Krylov | def. | Modestas Bukauskas | KO (punches) | 3 | 4:57 |
| Catchweight (128.5 lb) | Alex Perez | def. | Charles Johnson | TKO (punches) | 1 | 3:16 |
Early preliminary card (Paramount+ / UFC Fight Pass)
| Heavyweight | Josh Hokit | def. | Denzel Freeman | TKO (retirement) | 1 | 4:59 |
| Welterweight | Ty Miller | def. | Adam Fugitt | TKO (knee and punches) | 1 | 4:59 |

== Bonus awards ==
This event marked the introduction of the promotion's updated bonus structure, which increased Performance of the Night and Fight of the Night awards from $50,000 to $100,000 and added additional $25,000 bonuses for knockouts or submissions not selected among the standard post‑fight awards.

The following fighters received $100,000 bonuses. The other finishes received $25,000 additional bonuses, with the exception of Alex Perez, as he missed weight for his bout.

- Fight of the Night: Justin Gaethje vs. Paddy Pimblett
- Performance of the Night: Josh Hokit and Ty Miller

== See also ==
- 2026 in UFC
- List of current UFC fighters
- List of UFC events
