= UFC Fight Night: Grasso vs. Shevchenko 2 =

2023 mixed martial event in Nevada, US

- The poster for UFC Fight Night: Grasso vs. Shevchenko 2
- Promotion: Ultimate Fighting Championship
- Date: September 16, 2023
- Venue: T-Mobile Arena
- City: Paradise, Nevada, United States
- Attendance: 18,766
- Total gate: $2,265,537.16

Event chronology
UFC 293: Adesanya vs. Strickland	UFC Fight Night: Grasso vs. Shevchenko 2	UFC Fight Night: Fiziev vs. Gamrot

UFC Fight Night: Grasso vs. Shevchenko 2 (also known as UFC Fight Night 227, UFC on ESPN+ 85 and Noche UFC) was a mixed martial arts event produced by the Ultimate Fighting Championship that took place on September 16, 2023, at the T-Mobile Arena in Paradise, Nevada, part of the Las Vegas Metropolitan Area, United States.

== Background ==
The event celebrated Mexico's independence Day, which included having a variety of fighters of Mexican descent compete at the event; the concept rode the coattails of Las Vegas having traditionally hosted major boxing matches involving Mexican fighters on or around Independence Day.

A UFC Women's Flyweight Championship rematch between current champion Alexa Grasso and former champion Valentina Shevchenko headlined the event. The pair previously met at UFC 285 in March 2023 in which Grasso captured the title via a fourth round submission upset.

A welterweight bout between Shavkat Rakhmonov and former interim UFC Middleweight Championship challenger (also The Ultimate Fighter: Team Jones vs. Team Sonnen middleweight winner) Kelvin Gastelum was expected to take place at the event. However, Gastelum withdrew after sustaining a facial fracture.

A middleweight bout between Chris Curtis and Anthony Hernandez was expected to take place at the event. However, Curtis withdrew due to a rib injury and was replaced by Roman Kopylov. In turn, Hernandez pulled out of the bout due to a torn ligament and was replaced by Josh Fremd.

A welterweight bout between Daniel Rodriguez and Santiago Ponzinibbio was expected to take place at the event. However, Rodriguez was pulled from the bout by USADA after testing positive for the banned substance ostarine. Ponzinibbio then announced in early September that he would not be competing at the event after all.

A women's strawweight bout between Elise Reed and Cynthia Calvillo was expected to take place at the event. However, Calvillo pulled out due to undisclosed reasons and was replaced by Iasmin Lucindo in a catchweight bout of 120 pounds. In turn, Reed was removed from the event for undisclosed reason and was replaced by Josefine Lindgren Knutsson. Then, Lucindo withdrew from the event due to an undisclosed injury and newcomer Marnic Mann served as her replacement.

A lightweight bout between Natan Levy and Alex Reyes was scheduled for the event. However, Levy withdrew from the bout for undisclosed reasons and he was replaced by newcomer Charlie Campbell.

== Results ==
Main card (ESPN+)
Weight class				Method	Round	Time	Notes
Women's Flyweight	Alexa Grasso (c)	vs.	Valentina Shevchenko	Draw (split) (48–47, 47–48, 47–47)	5	5:00	(Note: For the UFC Women's Flyweight Championship.)
Welterweight	Jack Della Maddalena	def.	Kevin Holland	Decision (split) (28–29, 29–28, 29–28)	3	5:00
Bantamweight	Raul Rosas Jr.	def.	Terrence Mitchell	TKO (punches)	1	0:54
Lightweight	Daniel Zellhuber	def.	Christos Giagos	Submission (anaconda choke)	2	3:26
Featherweight	Kyle Nelson	def.	Fernando Padilla	Decision (unanimous) (29–28, 29–28, 30–27)	3	5:00
Preliminary card (ESPN+)
Women's Strawweight	Lupita Godinez	def.	Elise Reed	Submission (rear-naked choke)	2	3:30
Middleweight	Roman Kopylov	def.	Josh Fremd	KO (punch to the body)	2	4:44
Flyweight	Édgar Cháirez	vs.	Daniel Lacerda	No Contest (premature stoppage)	1	3:47	(Note: Originally a technical submission (anaconda choke) win for Cháirez; overturned after review due to a referee error.)
Women's Flyweight	Tracy Cortez	def.	Jasmine Jasudavicius	Decision (unanimous) (30–27, 30–27, 29–28)	3	5:00
Lightweight	Charlie Campbell	def.	Alex Reyes	TKO (punches)	1	3:38
Women's Strawweight	Josefine Lindgren Knutsson	def.	Marnic Mann	Decision (unanimous) (30–24, 30–25, 30–27)	3	5:00

== Bonus awards ==
The following fighters received $50,000 bonuses.

- Fight of the Night: No bonus awarded.
- Performance of the Night: Raúl Rosas Jr., Daniel Zellhuber, Lupita Godinez, Roman Kopylov, and Charlie Campbell

== See also ==
- 2023 in UFC
- List of current UFC fighters
- List of UFC events
- Noche UFC
