= Piccininni =

Piccininni is a surname. Notable people with the surname include:

- Joe Piccininni (1922–1995), Canadian politician
- Nick Piccininni (born 1996), American wrestler and mixed martial artist
