= Kevin Vallejos =

Argentine mixed martial artist (born 2001)

- Born: Kevin Axel Vallejos Montenegro; December 8, 2001 (age 24); Mar del Plata, Buenos Aires, Argentina
- Other names: El Chino
- Height: 5 ft 7 in (1.70 m)
- Weight: 145 lb (66 kg; 10 st 5 lb)
- Division: Featherweight; Lightweight
- Reach: 68 in (173 cm)
- Fighting out of: Mar del Plata, Argentina
- Team: Brothers of Life MMA
- Years active: 2021–present

Mixed martial arts record
- Total: 20
- Wins: 19
- By knockout: 13
- By submission: 2
- By decision: 4
- Losses: 1
- By decision: 1

Other information
- Mixed martial arts record from Sherdog

Kevin Axel Vallejos Montenegro (born December 8, 2001) is an Argentine mixed martial artist, who competes in the featherweight division of the Ultimate Fighting Championship (UFC). As of November 7, 2026, he is #10 in the Meta UFC featherweight rankings.

== Background ==
Vallejos was born in Mar del Plata in Buenos Aires, Argentina. He started out with boxing and also holds a blue belt in Brazilian Jiu-Jitsu. He amassed an amateur record of 14–0 before turning pro.

== Mixed martial arts career ==
=== Early career ===
Vallejos made his professional mixed martial arts debut in September 2021, defeating Rocco Cena by technical knockout at Supreme Warrior 6. He later competed in the Argentine promotion Samurai Fight House, where he captured multiple regional titles including bantamweight, featherweight, and lightweight championships including a defence over UFC veteran Luiz Eduardo Garagorri.

=== Dana White's Contender Series ===
After compiling an 11-0 professional record, Vallejos would compete for a UFC contract on Dana White's Contender Series: Season 7, Week 5 on September 6, 2023, but lost a unanimous decision to Jean Silva, marking his first career loss.

After two more wins on the South American regional scene, Vallejos was scheduled to return on Week 7 of Season 8 of Dana White's Contender Series on September 24, 2024, to face Luke Riley. However, Riley had to withdraw from the contest due to visa issues and was subsequently replaced by undefeated prospect Cam Teague. He won the fight via first-round knockout and was awarded a contract by Dana White.

=== Ultimate Fighting Championship ===
Vallejos made his UFC debut on March 15, 2025 at UFC Fight Night 254, where he defeated Seung Woo Choi by first-round technical knockout.

Vallejos would next face Danny Silva at UFC on ESPN 71 on August 2, 2025. He would win the fight by unanimous decision.

Vallejos would next fight Giga Chikadze in the co-main event of UFC on ESPN 73 on December 13, 2025. Vallejos recorded a knockout victory over Chikadze in the second round with a spinning backfist. This fight earned him a Performance of the Night award.

Vallejos faced Josh Emmett in the main event of UFC Fight Night 269 on March 14, 2026. He won the fight by technical knockout in the first round. This fight earned him a $100,000 Performance of the Night award.

Vallejos faced former UFC Bantamweight Champion Aljamain Sterling on November 21, 2026 at UFC Fight Night 294. He won the fight by unanimous decision. 9 out of 13 media outlets scored the bout for Vallejos.

== Championships and accomplishments ==
- Ultimate Fighting Championship
  - Performance of the Night (Two times) vs. Giga Chikadze and Josh Emmett
  - UFC.com Awards
    - 2025: Ranked #3 Newcomer of the Year
- Samurai Fight House
  - SFH Bantamweight Champion
  - Interim SFH Featherweight Champion
  - SFH Featherweight Champion
    - Three successful title defenses
  - SFH Lightweight Champion

== Mixed martial arts record ==
Professional record breakdown
20 matches	19 wins	1 loss
By knockout	13	0
By submission	2	0
By decision	4	1

Res.	Record	Opponent	Method	Event	Date	Round	Time	Location	Notes
Win	19–1	Aljamain Sterling	Decision (unanimous)	UFC Fight Night: Procházka vs. Stirling	21 November 2026	3	5:00	Al Rayyan, Qatar	
Win	18–1	Josh Emmett	TKO (knees and punches)	UFC Fight Night: Emmett vs. Vallejos	14 March 2026	1	3:33	Las Vegas, Nevada, United States	Performance of the Night.
Win	17–1	Giga Chikadze	KO (spinning backfist and elbows)	UFC on ESPN: Royval vs. Kape	13 December 2025	2	1:29	Las Vegas, Nevada, United States	Performance of the Night.
Win	16–1	Danny Silva	Decision (unanimous)	UFC on ESPN: Taira vs. Park	2 August 2025	3	5:00	Las Vegas, Nevada, United States	
Win	15–1	Choi Seung-woo	TKO (punches)	UFC Fight Night: Vettori vs. Dolidze 2	March 15, 2025	1	3:09	Las Vegas, Nevada, United States	
Win	14–1	Cam Teague	TKO (punches)	Dana White's Contender Series 73	24 September 2024	1	2:23	Las Vegas, Nevada, United States	
Win	13–1	Gonzalo Contreras	KO (punch)	Samurai Fight House 15	2 March 2024	2	4:23	Salto, Uruguay	Defended the SFH Featherweight Championship.
Win	12–1	Maximiliano Perez	Submission (rear-naked choke)	Samurai Fight House 14	22 December 2023	3	1:30	Buenos Aires, Argentina	Defended the SFH Featherweight Championship.
Loss	11–1	Jean Silva	Decision (unanimous)	Dana White's Contender Series 61	5 September 2023	3	5:00	Las Vegas, Nevada, United States	
Win	11–0	Luiz Eduardo Garagorri	TKO (elbows and punches)	Samurai Fight House 11	13 May 2023	2	3:15	Lomas de Zamora, Argentina	Return to Featherweight. Defended the SFH Featherweight Championship.
Win	10–0	Natanael Aldo Espindola	TKO (punches)	Samurai Fight House 10	11 March 2023	1	2:23	Buenos Aires, Argentina	Lightweight debut. Won the vacant SFH Lightweight Championship.
Win	9–0	Nestor Machado	Decision (unanimous)	Samurai Fight House 8	16 December 2022	3	5:00	Santa Fe, Argentina	Won the vacant SFH Featherweight Championship.
Win	8–0	Emmanuel Vallejos	TKO (punches)	Samurai Fight House 7	19 November 2022	2	1:04	San Carlos de Bariloche, Argentina	Return to Featherweight. Won the interim SFH Featherweight Championship.
Win	7–0	Pablo Etelechea	TKO (punches)	Samurai Fight House 6	15 October 2022	1	3:06	Buenos Aires, Argentina	Bantamweight debut. Won the inaugural SFH Bantamweight Championship.
Win	6–0	Mauricio Gabriel Flores	TKO (punches)	Samurai Fight House 5	19 June 2022	1	0:49	Buenos Aires, Argentina	
Win	5–0	Gabriel Vargas	Submission (rear-naked choke)	Samurai Fight House 4	22 May 2022	1	1:59	Buenos Aires, Argentina	
Win	4–0	Jesus Ru	Decision (unanimous)	Circuito Argentino de MMA 7	12 March 2022	3	5:00	Mar del Plata, Argentina	
Win	3–0	Lucas Miletich	KO (punch)	Samurai Fight House 3	12 February 2022	1	4:08	Buenos Aires, Argentina	
Win	2–0	Matias Ponce	KO (punch)	Cobra Fighter 1	5 December 2021	1	0:39	Pontevedra, Argentina	
Win	1–0	Rocco Cena	KO (punch)	Supreme Warriors 6	4 September 2021	2	3:40	Buenos Aires, Argentina	Featherweight debut.

== See also ==
- List of current UFC fighters
- List of Dana White's Contender Series alumni
- List of male mixed martial artists
