= Navajo Stirling =

New Zealand mixed martial artist (born 1997)

- Born: Rongotehengia Navajo Hunter Stirling; 7 November 1997 (age 29); Upper Hutt, Wellington, New Zealand
- Height: 6 ft 4 in (193 cm)
- Weight: 205 lb (93 kg; 14 st 9 lb)
- Division: Light Heavyweight
- Reach: 79 in (201 cm)
- Style: Kickboxing
- Stance: Orthodox
- Fighting out of: Auckland, New Zealand
- Team: City Kickboxing (2021–present)
- Trainer: Eugene Bareman; Doug Viney
- Years active: 2019–present

Mixed martial arts record
- Total: 12
- Wins: 12
- By knockout: 8
- By decision: 4
- Losses: 0

Other information
- Mixed martial arts record from Sherdog

Rongotehengia Navajo Hunter Stirling (born 7 November 1997) is a New Zealand professional mixed martial artist and former kickboxer. He currently competes in the Light Heavyweight division of the Ultimate Fighting Championship (UFC). As of October 24, 2026, he is #7 in the Meta UFC light heavyweight rankings.

== Early life and kickboxing career ==
Stirling was born on 7 November 1997, in Upper Hutt, New Zealand. He attended Upper Hutt College and played rugby growing up, but grew tired of the necessity to rely on teammates and signed up for karate classes at a nearby gym. Years later, Stirling developed an interest in mixed martial arts (MMA), specifically by watching Conor McGregor, and started dreaming of fighting in the Ultimate Fighting Championship (UFC). In 2020, while visiting his brother in Auckland, he tagged along on a trip to the City Kickboxing gym, where he realised that kickboxing could be his chance to follow his UFC dreams. Stirling later stated: "That visit made me realise I should have been here ages ago." After returning home, he began training under Sone Vannathy at the Arch Angels Thai Kickboxing Gym in Wellington.

Stirling fought at the amateur level before moving to The Lion Pit, also in Wellington, where he began his professional career. He won the King in the Ring 92 kg III tournament in December 2020 as "a largely unknown prospect" by defeating Nato La'auli in the final. Stirling compiled a 6–1 professional record before moving to City Kickboxing in Auckland in March 2021. That June, he won the King in the Ring 100 kg IV tournament by defeating James Craughwell in the final, joining Israel Adesanya and Carlos Ulberg as the only two-weight champions in the history of the tournament.

On 9 September 2022, Stirling was scheduled to face Jesse Astill in the co-main event of the King in the Ring SUPERV event for the WKBF Professional Heavyweight K1 Championship.

== Mixed martial arts career ==
During his kickboxing career, Stirling also developed his grappling and jiu-jitsu skills in preparation for a switch to MMA, even competing at regional no-gi competitions. He made his professional MMA debut on 23 September 2022, defeating James Craughwell via unanimous decision at Shuriken Fight Series 12 in Auckland to capture the Shuriken heavyweight championship. However, Stirling struggled to find willing opponents at the regional scene and waited over a year for his first title defence, during which he continued rounding out his skills. He retained the title by defeating Kelvin Fitial via first-round technical knockout (TKO) at Shuriken Fight Series 16.

On 4 May 2024, Stirling stopped Stu Dare in the first round of their fight at Hex Fight Series 30. The following month, he defeated Sam Kei via third-round TKO at Hex Fight Series 31 to capture the vacant Hex light heavyweight championship. On 10 September 2024, Stirling knocked out Phillip Latu in the second round of their fight in the main event of Dana White's Contender Series 71. He improved his record to 5–0 and was one of three fighters on the card to be awarded a UFC contract after drawing praise from UFC president Dana White.

Stirling made his UFC debut on 14 December 2024, defeating Tuco Tokkos via unanimous decision at UFC on ESPN 63.

In his next fight, Stirling faced Ivan Erslan at UFC 315 on 10 May 2025. He won the fight via unanimous decision.

On 27 September 2025, Stirling faced Rodolfo Bellato at UFC Fight Night 260, which was held in Perth. He won the fight via unanimous decision.

In his next fight, Stirling faced Bruno Lopes at UFC Fight Night 271 on 28 March 2026. He won the fight via second-round TKO, earning the first finish of his UFC career.

Stirling faced Ion Cutelaba on 20 June 2026 at UFC Fight Night 279. He won the fight by technical knockout in the second round.

Stirling faced former UFC Light Heavyweight Champion Jan Błachowicz on 1 August 2026 at UFC Fight Night 283. He won the fight by technical knockout via elbows and punches in the first round. This fight earned him a $100,000 Performance of the Night award.

Stirling faced former champion Jiří Procházka in the main event on 21 November 2026 at UFC Fight Night 294. He won the fight by knockout via a right hook at the end of the second round. The win earned Stirling his second consecutive $100,000 Performance of the Night award.

== Personal life ==
Stirling is of Te Whānau-ā-Apanui descent. Early in his career, he started dyeing his hair blond because "word of mouth is a lot easier when people are hearing 'Who's the big blonde guy?'". Stirling has spoken about his struggle with alcohol in his teenage years before he found martial arts, realising that "this was something worth fighting for".

Stirling goes by his middle name, Navajo, which was given to him by his father, a fan of the Western film genre. His brother, Shaquille, was named after Shaquille O'Neal.

== Championships and accomplishments ==
=== Mixed martial arts ===
- Ultimate Fighting Championship
  - Performance of the Night (Two times) vs. Jan Błachowicz and Jiří Procházka
  - Tied (Chuck Liddell) for the fifth longest win streak in UFC Light Heavyweight division history (7)
  - Highest striking differential in UFC Light Heavyweight division history (3.76)
  - Third most significant strikes-per-minute in UFC Light Heavyweight division history (6.2)
- Hex Fight Series
  - Hex Fight Series Light Heavyweight Champion
- Shuriken Fight Series
  - Shuriken Fight Series Heavyweight Champion

=== Kickboxing ===
- King in the Ring
  - 2020 King in the Ring 92 kg III Champion (eight-man tournament)
  - 2021 King in the Ring 100 kg IV Champion (eight-man tournament)
- World Kickboxing Federation
  - WKBF World Professional Heavyweight K1 Championship
- World Kickboxing Network
  - WKN World Professional Heavyweight K1 Championship

=== Muay Thai ===
- WBC MuayThai New Zealand
  - WBC New Zealand Professional Heavyweight Muay Thai Championship
- World Kickboxing Association MuayThai
  - WKA New Zealand Professional Heavyweight Muay Thai Championship
- New Zealand Muay Thai Federation
  - NZMF North Island Amateur Heavyweight Championship

== Mixed martial arts record ==
Professional record breakdown
12 matches	12 wins	0 losses
By knockout	8	0
By decision	4	0

Res.	Record	Opponent	Method	Event	Date	Round	Time	Location	Notes
Win	12–0	Jiří Procházka	KO (punches)	UFC Fight Night: Procházka vs. Stirling	21 November 2026	2	4:58	Al Rayyan, Qatar	Performance of the Night.
Win	11–0	Jan Błachowicz	TKO (elbows and punches)	UFC Fight Night: Medić vs. Rodriguez	1 August 2026	1	2:56	Belgrade, Serbia	Performance of the Night.
Win	10–0	Ion Cutelaba	TKO (punches and elbows)	UFC Fight Night: Kape vs. Horiguchi	20 June 2026	2	3:23	Las Vegas, Nevada, United States	
Win	9–0	Bruno Lopes	TKO (elbows and punches)	UFC Fight Night: Adesanya vs. Pyfer	28 March 2026	2	4:05	Seattle, Washington, United States	
Win	8–0	Rodolfo Bellato	Decision (unanimous)	UFC Fight Night: Ulberg vs. Reyes	28 September 2025	3	5:00	Perth, Australia	
Win	7–0	Ivan Erslan	Decision (unanimous)	UFC 315	10 May 2025	3	5:00	Montreal, Quebec, Canada	
Win	6–0	Tuco Tokkos	Decision (unanimous)	UFC on ESPN: Covington vs. Buckley	14 December 2024	3	5:00	Tampa, Florida, United States	
Win	5–0	Phillip Latu	KO (punch)	Dana White's Contender Series 71	10 September 2024	2	2:21	Las Vegas, Nevada, United States	
Win	4–0	Sam Kei	TKO (punches)	Hex Fight Series 31	14 June 2024	3	1:48	Melbourne, Australia	Won the vacant Hex Light Heavyweight Championship.
Win	3–0	Stuart Dare	KO (knee and punches)	Hex Fight Series 30	4 May 2024	1	3:46	Auckland, New Zealand	Light Heavyweight debut.
Win	2–0	Kelvin Fitial	TKO (slam and punches)	Shuriken Fight Series 16	28 October 2023	1	2:41	Auckland, New Zealand	Defended the SFS Heavyweight Championship.
Win	1–0	James Craughwell	Decision (unanimous)	Shuriken Fight Series 12	23 September 2022	5	5:00	Auckland, New Zealand	Heavyweight debut. Won the inaugural SFS Heavyweight Championship.

== Kickboxing and Muay Thai record ==
Professional Muay Thai and Kickboxing record
17 Wins (9 (T)KOs), 2 Losses, 0 Draw
Date	Result	Opponent	Event	Location	Method	Round	Time
2023-06-10	Win	(New Zealand) Harry Kim	King in the Ring	Auckland, New Zealand	Decision (unanimous)	3	3:00
2023-03-18	Win	(New Zealand) James Craughwell	King in the Ring	Auckland, New Zealand	TKO (punches)	2	2:13
2022-09-09	Win	(Australia) Jesse Astill	King in the Ring 100 kg IV, Final	Auckland, New Zealand	Decision (unanimous)	5	3:00
Wins the WKBF K-1 World Heavyweight Championship.
2022-06-11	Win	(New Zealand) Kurt Douglas	King in the Ring 72 kg IV	Auckland, New Zealand	KO (knee to the head)	3	2:22
2021-06-19	Win	(New Zealand) James Craughwell	King in the Ring 100 kg IV, Final	Auckland, New Zealand	Decision (unanimous)	3	3:00
Wins the King in the Ring 100 kg IV Tournament title.
2021-06-19	Win	(New Zealand) Rini Le Comte	King in the Ring 100 kg IV, Semifinals	Auckland, New Zealand	TKO (2 knockdowns)	2	2:07
2021-06-19	Win	(New Zealand) Joel Martin	King in the Ring 100 kg IV, Semifinals	Auckland, New Zealand	TKO (2 knockdowns)	2	0:35
2020-12-05	Win	(New Zealand) Nato La'auli	King in the Ring 92 kg III, Final	Auckland, New Zealand	Decision (unanimous)	3	3:00
Wins the King in the Ring 92 kg III Tournament title.
2020-12-05	Win	(New Zealand) Robert Ngari Dean	King in the Ring 92 kg III, Semifinals	Auckland, New Zealand	TKO (corner retirement)	1	3:00
2020-12-05	Win	(New Zealand) Jason King	King in the Ring 92 kg III, Quarterfinals	Auckland, New Zealand	Decision (unanimous)	3	3:00
2020-10-31	Win	(New Zealand) Des Tana	Roar Fight Nights 4	Lower Hutt, New Zealand	Decision	5	3:00
Wins the WBC Muay Thai New Zealand Heavyweight Championship.
2020-02-15	Win	(New Zealand) David Bendall	Roar Fight Nights 3	Lower Hutt, New Zealand	Decision (unanimous)	5	3:00
Wins the vacant WKA New Zealand Heavyweight Muay Thai Championship.
2019-11-30	Win	(Tonga) Lapa Halangahu	WKN - NZ Kickboxing and MMA World Cup	Auckland, New Zealand	KO	3	
Wins WKN K-1 World Heavyweight Championship.
2019-08-24	Loss	(New Zealand) Ricky Esilva	Road to Rumble	Porirua, New Zealand	Decision (split)	5	3:00
For the vacant WKA New Zealand Heavyweight Muay Thai Championship.
2019-03-30	Loss	(New Zealand) Fou Ah-Lam	King in the Ring 92 kg II, Quarterfinals	Auckland, New Zealand	Decision (majority)	3	3:00
Legend: Win Loss Draw/No contest Notes

== See also ==
- List of current UFC fighters
- List of Dana White's Contender Series alumni
- List of male mixed martial artists
- List of undefeated mixed martial artists
