= Islam Dulatov =

German model and mixed martial arts fighter

- Born: August 2, 1998 (age 28); Urus-Martan, Chechnya, Russia
- Other names: The Ripper
- Height: 6 ft 3 in (1.91 m)
- Weight: 170 lb (77 kg; 12 st 2 lb)
- Division: Welterweight; Lightweight; Featherweight
- Reach: 75 in (191 cm)
- Fighting out of: Düsseldorf, Germany
- Rank: Blue belt in Brazilian Jiu-Jitsu
- Years active: 2019–present

Mixed martial arts record
- Total: 13
- Wins: 12
- By knockout: 8
- By submission: 4
- Losses: 1
- By decision: 1

Other information
- Occupation: Fashion model and mixed martial artist
- Mixed martial arts record from Sherdog

Islam Dulatov (born August 2, 1998) is a German mixed martial artist and professional fashion model. He is currently competing in the welterweight division of the Ultimate Fighting Championship (UFC).

== Background ==
Dulatov was born in the small town of Urus-Martan, Chechnya, Russia. He grew up in a large family with six brothers, being the middle child. During the turbulent years of the Second Chechen War, Dulatov's family frequently moved across the region, including to Shali and Grozny, in search of safety. Due to the ongoing insurgency, the Dulatov brothers had little opportunity to attend school. Instead, they spent much of their time outdoors, engaging in bodyweight workouts and helping their parents by unloading trucks to support the family financially.

In December 2007, the family relocated to Germany as war refugees. Initially, Dulatov and his brothers struggled to adapt to their new environment, particularly in school, where the language barrier posed a significant challenge. However, participating in sports and training in mixed martial arts played a crucial role in helping them adjust. It not only aided their socialization but also gave them the confidence to stand up for themselves during confrontations and fights.

== Career ==
=== Professional fashion model ===
Dulatov's eldest brother, Djibril, who had established a successful career as a model for prestigious fashion brands such as Lavin, Gucci and Alexander McQueen, played a pivotal role in shaping the paths of his younger brothers. When his brothers Islam, Sulumbek, and Tamerlan turned 18, Djibril introduced them to the world of modeling, effectively influencing their decision to pursue careers in fashion. Despite their modeling careers, the brothers chose to maintain their dedication to mixed martial arts (MMA), continuing their rigorous training and competing in the sport. This decision led them to forgo higher education, focusing instead in both modeling and MMA.

Dulatov walked for fashion designers such as Gucci, Lavin and Tommy Hilfiger, Hugo Boss and appeared in the British Vogue as one of the top 10 male models in 2018. He signed an exclusive contract with Versace, walking in fashion Week six times under their banner. Additionally, Dulatov has posed for notable magazines such as GQ and many others.

I canceled a lot of shootings when I was younger. We had some problems with money and everything. This time, modeling was really helping me with my situation. I remember when I canceled a shooting for $5,000. At this time, that was a lot of money for me. The fight, which was the same day, was for like 200 euros or something like that. … At the end of the moment, the fight was canceled too because my opponent had an injury. I had these situations like 10 times, with even more money and everything. But to be honest, I love to be a fighter and that’s what I do.

=== Mixed martial arts ===
==== Early career ====
After compiling an amateur record of 4–1, Dulatov started his professional MMA career in 2019. He amassed a professional record of 10–1 prior participating in Dana White's Contender Series.

==== Dana White's Contender Series ====
Dulatov appeared on the eighth season of Dana White's Contender Series on October 8, 2024, against Vanilto Antunes who was the former champion of Legacy Fighting Alliance at Dana White's Contender Series 75. He won the fight in round one via knockout. With the win, Dulatov was offered a UFC contract.

==== Ultimate Fighting Championship ====
Dulatov was scheduled to face Adam Fugitt on February 22, 2025, at UFC Fight Night 252. However, he was forced to withdraw due to a serious injury and was replaced by Billy Goff. In turn, the bout was scrapped during fight week as Fugitt pulled out due to injury.

The bout between Dulatov and Fugitt was rescheduled and took place on July 19, 2025, at UFC 318. Dulatov won the fight by knockout in the first round. This fight earned him his first Performance of the Night award.

Dulatov was scheduled to face Wellington Turman on July 25, 2026 at UFC Fight Night 282. However, Dulatov withdrew from the bout just hours before the event due to illness and the matchup was cancelled.

Dulatov is scheduled to face Levan Chokheli on December 5, 2026, at UFC Fight Night 295.

== Personal life ==
Dulatov and his three brothers invested in a hairdressing salon, owned a bar named "J'adore Lounge" in Düsseldorf and are planning to open a gym, restaurant and launching a clothing brand in the near future.

=== Counterfeit luxury watch allegations ===
In July 2020, the Instagram project Munich Wrist Busters published a post providing visual evidence that a luxury watch displayed by Islam Dulatov was a counterfeit replica. Immediately following this public exposure, Dulatov restricted his previously public Instagram profile to private and disabled the comment function to prevent further discourse on the matter.

=== Antisemitism and conspiracy theories ===
Islam Dulatov and his brothers Tamerlan and Djibril shared antisemitic content and conspiracy theories on social media platforms, according to an investigation by the anti‑fascism organization Belltower.News.

Islam Dulatov also posted a quote from Nazi Reichminister Hermann Göring in April 2021, writing "...history is repeating itself..." without clarifying his intended meaning.

== Championships and accomplishments ==
=== Mixed martial arts ===
- Ultimate Fighting Championship
  - Performance of the Night (One time) vs. Adam Fugitt

== Mixed martial arts record ==
Professional record breakdown
13 matches	12 wins	1 loss
By knockout	8	0
By submission	4	0
By decision	0	1

Res.	Record	Opponent	Method	Event	Date	Round	Time	Location	Notes
Win	12–1	Adam Fugitt	KO (punches)	UFC 318	July 19, 2025	1	4:06	New Orleans, Louisiana, United States	Performance of the Night.
Win	11–1	Vanilton Antunes	KO (elbow)	Dana White's Contender Series 71	October 8, 2024	1	2:44	Las Vegas, Nevada, United States	
Win	10–1	Ioannis Palaiologos	TKO (knee to the body)	Oktagon 53	February 7, 2024	1	4:59	Oberhausen, Germany	Performance of the Night.
Win	9–1	Will Chope	TKO (punches)	Sparta CF 3	October 7, 2023	1	2:00	Vienna, Austria	
Win	8–1	Patrick Spirk	Submission (arm-triangle choke)	Sparta CF 2	March 11, 2023	1	0:48	Schwechat, Austria	
Win	7–1	Kleverson Cruz da Silva	TKO (punches)	Brave CF 61	August 6, 2022	1	2:48	Bonn, Germany	
Win	6–1	Michael Rirsch	Submission (brabo choke)	National FC 8	April 2, 2022	1	0:46	Düsseldorf, Germany	
Win	5–1	Giorgi Kankava	KO (punches)	GMC Fight Night 7	June 19, 2021	2	N/A	Gelsenkirchen, Germany	
Win	4–1	Ibrahim Celik	TKO (punches)	German MMA Championship 25	May 22, 2021	1	N/A	Gelsenkirchen, Germany	
Win	3–1	Laith Najjar	TKO (punches)	GMC Fight Night 6	March 20, 2021	1	0:44	Gelsenkirchen, Germany	Welterweight debut.
Win	2–1	Vladan Maksic	Submission (rear-naked choke)	Elite MMA Championship 4	February 26, 2020	1	0:53	Düsseldorf, Germany	Catchweight (165 lb) bout.
Win	1–1	Kolja Predojevic	Submission (rear-naked choke)	National FC 1	October 26, 2019	1	0:34	Krefeld, Germany	Lightweight debut.
Loss	0–1	Gjoni Palokaj	Decision (unanimous)	German MMA Championship 21	September 7, 2019	3	5:00	Cologne, Germany	Featherweight debut.

== See also ==
- List of current UFC fighters
- List of male mixed martial artists
