= 2024 in Legacy Fighting Alliance =

Information
- Promotion: Legacy Fighting Alliance
- First date: January 12, 2024
- Last date: December 6, 2024

Events
- Total events: 25

Fights
- Total fights: 295
- Title fights: 17

2024 was the eighth year in the history of Legacy Fighting Alliance, a mixed martial arts promotion based in the United States.

== List of events ==
| # | Event | Date | Venue | Location |
|---|---|---|---|---|
| 1 | LFA 174: Jones vs. Gennrich | January 12, 2024 | Mystic Lake Casino Hotel | Prior Lake, Minnesota, U.S. |
| 2 | LFA 175: Lopes vs. Brigagão | January 27, 2024 | Ginásio do Polvilho | Cajamar, Brazil |
| 3 | LFA 176: Johns vs. Walker | February 9, 2024 | Arizona Financial Theatre | Phoenix, Arizona, U.S. |
| 4 | LFA 177: Smyth vs. Magomedov | February 23, 2024 | Seneca Niagara Casino & Hotel | Niagara Falls, New York, U.S. |
| 5 | LFA 178: Satybaldiev vs. Assis | March 8, 2024 | Kaiser Permanente Arena | Santa Cruz, California, U.S. |
| 6 | LFA 179: Neto vs. Antunes | March 23, 2024 | Parque Olimpico | Rio de Janeiro, Brazil |
| 7 | LFA 180: Lawrence vs. Ward | March 29, 2024 | Broadbent Arena | Louisville, Kentucky, U.S. |
| 8 | LFA 181: Siqueira vs. Hernandez | April 5, 2024 | Mystic Lake Casino Hotel | Prior Lake, Minnesota, U.S. |
| 9 | LFA 182: McKee vs. Hernandez | April 26, 2024 | Sanford Pentagon | Sioux Falls, South Dakota, U.S. |
| 10 | LFA 183: Cantanhede vs. Guimarães | May 3, 2024 | Complexo Ribalta | Rio de Janeiro, Brazil |
| 11 | LFA 184: Diaz vs. Lewis | May 17, 2024 | Commerce Casino & Hotel | Commerce, California, U.S. |
| 12 | LFA 185: Gennrich vs. Lewis | June 7, 2024 | Horseshoe Hammond | Hammond, Indiana, U.S. |
| 13 | LFA 186: Bekoev vs. Foxworth | June 22, 2024 | Magness Arena | Denver, Colorado, U.S. |
| 14 | LFA 187: Brazil vs. Latin America | July 6, 2024 | Ginásio do Polvilho | São Paulo, Brazil |
| 15 | LFA 188: Sweeney vs. do Nascimento | July 14, 2024 | Wild Horse Pass Casino | Chandler, Arizona, U.S. |
| 16 | LFA 189: Kuziutina vs. Ellen | August 2, 2024 | Seneca Allegany Resort & Casino | Salamanca, New York, U.S. |
| 17 | LFA 190: Chapolin vs. Siqueira | August 23, 2024 | Commerce Casino & Hotel | Commerce, California, U.S. |
| 18 | LFA 191: Prado vs. Lopes | August 30, 2024 | Ginásio do Povilho | Cajamar, Brazil |
| 19 | LFA 192: Climaco vs. Dias | September 13, 2024 | Kaiser Permanente Arena | Santa Cruz, California, U.S. |
| 20 | LFA 193: Bowers vs. Borisova | September 20, 2024 | Mystic Lake Casino Hotel | Prior Lake, Minnesota, U.S. |
| 21 | LFA 194: Magomedov vs. Leyva | October 18, 2024 | Seneca Niagara Resort & Casino | Niagara Falls, New York, U.S. |
| 22 | LFA 195: Wetzell vs. Usmonov | October 25, 2024 | Dobson Arena | Vail, Colorado, U.S. |
| 23 | LFA 196: Tanner vs. Ureña | November 8, 2024 | Arizona Financial Theatre | Phoenix, Arizona, U.S. |
| 24 | LFA 197: Kuziutina vs. Guimarães | November 22, 2024 | Ginásio do Povilho | Cajamar, Brazil |
| 25 | LFA 198: Miranda vs. Oyarzún | December 6, 2024 | Commerce Casino & Hotel | Commerce, California, U.S. |

== Title fights ==
Title fights in 2024
| Weight class | | | | Method | Round | Time | Event | Notes |
|---|---|---|---|---|---|---|---|---|
| Lightweight | Kegan Gennrich | def. | JaCobi Jones | Submission (arm-triangle choke) | 5 | 2:08 | LFA 174 | (Note: For the vacant LFA Lightweight Championship. Jones missed weight (155.2 lb) and was stripped of the title, only Gennrich was eligible to win the title.) |
| Light Heavyweight | Bruno Lopes (c) | def. | Marcos Brigagão | Submission (arm-triangle choke) | 2 | 4:58 | LFA 175 | (Note: For the LFA Light Heavyweight Championship.) |
| Featherweight | Elijah Johns | def. | Alfred Walker | Decision (unanimous) (49–46, 48–47, 48–47) | 5 | 5:00 | LFA 176 | (Note: For the vacant LFA Featherweight Championship.) |
| Women's Flyweight | Shannon Clark | def. | Thaiany Lopes | Technical Submission (bulldog choke) | 2 | 2:12 | LFA 177 | (Note: For the vacant LFA Women's Flyweight Championship.) |
| Welterweight | Shamidkhan Magomedov | def. | Devin Smyth | TKO (punches) | 1 | 3:55 | LFA 177 | (Note: For the interim LFA Welterweight Championship.) |
| Light Heavyweight | Uran Satybaldiev | def. | Bruno Assis | TKO (punches) | 2 | 2:12 | LFA 178 | (Note: For the interim LFA Light Heavyweight Championship.) |
| Welterweight | Vanilto Antunes | def. | Geraldo Neto (c) | TKO (punches) | 1 | 3:41 | LFA 179 | (Note: For the LFA Welterweight Championship.) |
| Flyweight | Igor Siqueira | def. | Eimar Hernandez | KO (punch) | 1 | 1:07 | LFA 181 | (Note: For the interim LFA Flyweight Championship.) |
| Lightweight | Richie Lewis | def. | Kegan Gennrich (c) | Decision (unanimous) (48–47, 50–45, 50–45) | 5 | 5:00 | LFA 185 | (Note: For the LFA Lightweight Championship.) |
| Middleweight | Azamat Bekoev (c) | def. | Chauncey Foxworth | KO (punch) | 2 | 4:32 | LFA 186 | (Note: For the LFA Middleweight Championship.) |
| Bantamweight | John Sweeney | def. | Rafael do Nascimento | Decision (unanimous) (50–45, 50–45, 49–46) | 5 | 5:00 | LFA 188 | (Note: For the vacant LFA Bantamweight Championship. Sweeney missed weight (141.4 lb) and was stripped of the title. Only do Nascimento was eligible to win the title.) |
| Women's Strawweight | Natalia Kuziutina (ic) | def. | Bruna Ellen | Decision (unanimous) (50–45, 49–46, 50–45) | 5 | 5:00 | LFA 189 | (Note: For the interim LFA Women's Strawweight Championship.) |
| Featherweight | Lerryan Douglas | def. | Javier Reyes | KO (punch) | 2 | 2:56 | LFA 190 | (Note: For the interim LFA Featherweight Championship.) |
| Flyweight | Eduardo Chapolin (c) | def. | Igor Siqueira (ic) | KO (punches) | 1 | 1:26 | LFA 190 | (Note: For the LFA Flyweight Championship.) |
| Women's Flyweight | Cheyanne Bowers | def. | Veronika Borisova | Submission (armbar) | 1 | 2:10 | LFA 193 | (Note: For the interim LFA Women's Flyweight Championship.) |
| Welterweight | Shamidkhan Magomedov (ic) | def. | Alfonso Leyva | KO (punches) | 1 | 1:17 | LFA 194 | (Note: For the interim LFA Welterweight Championship.) |
| Women's Strawweight | Natalia Kuziutina (ic) | def. | Yasmin Guimarães | Decision (unanimous) (47–45, 49–43, 48–45) | 5 | 5:00 | LFA 197 | (Note: For the interim LFA Women's Strawweight Championship.) |

== LFA 174: Jones vs. Gennrich ==
LFA 174: Jones vs. Gennrich
- Promotion: Legacy Fighting Alliance
- Date: January 12, 2024
- Venue: Mystic Lake Casino Hotel
- City: Prior Lake, Minnesota, United States

LFA 174: Jones vs. Gennrich was a mixed martial arts event promoted by Legacy Fighting Alliance and took place on January 12, 2024, at Mystic Lake Casino Hotel in Prior Lake, Minnesota, United States. It aired on UFC Fight Pass.

=== Background ===
A LFA Lightweight Championship bout between reigning champion JaCobi Jones and challenger Kegan Gennrich headlined the event. At the weigh-ins, Jones weighed in at 155.2 pounds, 0.2 pounds over the title limit. As a result, upon commencement of the fight, Jones was stripped of the title and only Gennrich was eligible to win it.

A 140-pound catchweight bout between Quang Le and Cody Peterson served as the co-main event.

=== Results ===
Main Card (UFC Fight Pass)
| Weight class | | | | Method | Round | Time | Notes |
|---|---|---|---|---|---|---|---|
| Lightweight | Kegan Gennrich | def. | JaCobi Jones | Submission (arm-triangle choke) | 5 | 2:08 | (Note: For the LFA Lightweight Championship. (as Jones missed weight and was stripped of the title, only Gennrich was eligible)) |
| Catchweight (140 lbs) | Quang Le | def. | Cody Peterson | TKO (head kick and punches) | 1 | 1:05 |
| Middleweight | Wes Schultz | def. | Maurice Morris | TKO (punches) | 1 | 1:52 | (Note: Morris missed weight (187.4 lbs)) |
| Bantamweight | Adamu Isah | def. | Devante Sewell | Decision (unanimous) (30–27, 30–27, 30–27) | 3 | 5:00 |
| Women's Strawweight | Jayde Sheeley | def. | Kendra McIntyre | DQ (illegal kick) | 1 | 2:50 |
| Heavyweight | Steven Asplund | def. | Billy Ray Valdez | TKO (doctor stoppage) | 1 | 4:48 |
Preliminary card (LFA Fight Network)
| Heavyweight | Alvin Hines | def. | Will Johnson | Submission (keylock) | 2 | 1:02 |
| Lightweight | Kelton Sneve | def. | Coty Milhausen | TKO (punches) | 1 | 4:54 |
| Women's Flyweight | Cheyanne Bowers | def. | Whittany Pyles | Submission (armbar) | 1 | 3:52 |
| Middleweight | Zeb Vincent | def. | Herbert Rogers-Williams | DQ (knee to groin) | 1 | 3:17 |
| Featherweight | Taner Trembley | def. | Dylan Smerillo | Submission (rear-naked choke) | 1 | 2:11 |
| Light Heavyweight | Mervin Miller | def. | Kory Moegenburg | Submission (arm-triangle choke) | 1 | 3:49 |
Amateur bouts
| Heavyweight | Ezayah Gomez Oropeza | def. | Jesse Midas | TKO (punches) | 1 | 1:58 |
| Featherweight | Xavier Rosenbloom | def. | Dalan Jones | Decision (unanimous) | 3 | 3:00 |

== LFA 175: Lopes vs. Brigagão ==
LFA 175: Lopes vs. Brigagão
- Promotion: Legacy Fighting Alliance
- Date: January 27, 2024
- Venue: Ginásio do Polvilho
- City: Cajamar, Brazil

LFA 175: Lopes vs. Brigagão was a mixed martial arts event promoted by Legacy Fighting Alliance and that took place on January 27, 2024, at the Ginásio do Polvilho in Cajamar, Brazil. It aired on UFC Fight Pass.

=== Background ===
A LFA Light Heavyweight Championship bout between reigning champion Bruno Lopes and challenger Marcos Brigagão headlined the event.

=== Results ===
Main Card (UFC Fight Pass)
| Weight class | | | | Method | Round | Time | Notes |
|---|---|---|---|---|---|---|---|
| Light Heavyweight | Bruno Lopes (c) | def. | Marcos Brigagão | Submission (arm-triangle choke) | 2 | 4:58 | (Note: For the LFA Light Heavyweight Championship.) |
| Lightweight | Samuel Silva | def. | Anderson Ferreira | Submission (guillotine choke) | 2 | 2:48 |
| Middleweight | Marco Tulio | def. | Cemey dos Santos | KO (punches) | 2 | 2:20 | (Note: dos Santos missed weight (190 lbs)) |
| Bantamweight | Rafael Pereira | def. | Fernando Laurenço | Submission (rear-naked choke) | 1 | 0:51 |
| Women's Strawweight | Naizi Cantanhede | def. | Lany Silva | Decision (split) (29–28, 28–29, 29–28) | 3 | 5:00 |
| Bantamweight | Apollo Gomes | vs. | Vinicius Pires | No Contest (accidental eye poke) | 2 | 2:35 | (Note: Accidental eye poke rendered Gomes unable to continue.) |
Preliminary card (LFA Fight Network)
| Light Heavyweight | Kevin Christian | def. | Miguel Porto | TKO (knee to the body and punches) | 2 | 0:39 |
| Women's Bantamweight | Nicoly Pedroza | def. | Andreyna Rocha | Decision (unanimous) (28–26, 29–26, 28–27) | 3 | 5:00 |
| Lightweight | Juan Pablo Vieira | def. | Marcos Bruno | KO (punches) | 2 | 4:16 |
| Heavyweight | Tallison Teixeira | def. | Arthur Fonseca | TKO (punches) | 1 | 3:31 |
| Women's Strawweight | Gabriela Fujimoto | def. | Sabrina Oliveira | Decision (unanimous) (29–28, 29–28, 30–27) | 3 | 5:00 |
| Welterweight | Reginaldo Geraldo Jr. | def. | Gustavo Henrique | KO (punch) | 1 | 1:03 |
| Women's Flyweight | Beatriz Consuli | def. | Carol Foro | Decision (split) (29–28, 28–29, 29–28) | 3 | 5:00 |
| Women's Strawweight | Aieza Bertolso | def. | Fabrizia Ketlinn | Decision (split) (29–28, 28–29, 30–27) | 3 | 5:00 |

== LFA 176: Johns vs. Walker ==
LFA 176: Johns vs. Walker
- Promotion: Legacy Fighting Alliance
- Date: February 9, 2024
- Venue: Arizona Financial Theatre
- City: Phoenix, Arizona, United States

LFA 176: Johns vs. Walker was a mixed martial arts event promoted by Legacy Fighting Alliance and that took place on February 9, 2024, at Arizona Financial Theatre in Phoenix, Arizona, United States. It aired on UFC Fight Pass.

=== Background ===
A LFA Featherweight Championship bout between Elijah Johns and Alfred Walker headlined the event.

=== Fight Card ===
Main Card (UFC Fight Pass)
| Weight class | | | | Method | Round | Time | Notes |
|---|---|---|---|---|---|---|---|
| Featherweight | Elijah Johns | def. | Alfred Walker | Decision (unanimous) (49–46, 48–47, 48–47) | 5 | 5:00 | (Note: For the vacant LFA Featherweight Championship.) |
| Flyweight | An Tuan Ho | def. | Miguel Sanson | Decision (unanimous) (30–27, 29–28, 29–28) | 3 | 5:00 |
| Middleweight | Mansur Abdul-Malik | def. | Allan St-Gelais | KO (punches) | 1 | 1:40 |
| Women's Strawweight | Leslie Hernandez | def. | Brittany Camozzi | TKO (punches and elbows) | 1 | 4:58 |
| Lightweight | Robson Junior | def. | Carlo Ricci | Submission (arm-triangle choke) | 1 | 2:01 |
Preliminary card (LFA Fight Network)
| Flyweight | Chance Ikei | def. | Keynan Davis | TKO (rib injury) | 1 | 3:29 |
| Women's Strawweight | Aline David | def. | Grace DiFrancesco | Decision (split) (29–28, 28–29, 29–28). | 3 | 5:00 |
| Flyweight | Nicholas Gjelaj | def. | Jared Braun | Decision (split) (30–27, 28–29, 29–28). | 3 | 5:00 |
| Welterweight | Johan Rodríguez | def. | Jeremiah Humphrey | Decision (unanimous) (29–28, 29–28, 30–27) | 3 | 5:00 |
Amateur bouts
| Featherweight | Paul Marghitas | def. | Lucas Hightree | Submission (rear-naked choke) | 1 | 1:14 |

== LFA 177: Smyth vs. Magomedov ==
LFA 177: Smyth vs. Magomedov
- Promotion: Legacy Fighting Alliance
- Date: February 23, 2024
- Venue: Seneca Niagara Casino & Hotel
- City: Niagara Falls, New York, United States

LFA 177: Smyth vs. Magomedov was a mixed martial arts event promoted by Legacy Fighting Alliance and that took place on February 23, 2024, at the Seneca Niagara Casino & Hotel in Niagara Falls, New York, United States. It aired on UFC Fight Pass.

=== Background ===
An interim LFA Welterrweight Championship bout between Devin Smyth and Shamidkhan Magomedov headlined the event, while a LFA Women's Flyweight Championship bout between Shannon Clark and Thaiany Lopes served as the co-main event.

=== Fight Card ===
Main Card (UFC Fight Pass)
| Weight class | | | | Method | Round | Time | Notes |
|---|---|---|---|---|---|---|---|
| Welterweight | Shamidkhan Magomedov | def. | Devin Smyth | TKO (punches) | 1 | 3:55 | (Note: For the interim LFA Welterweight Championship.) |
| Women's Flyweight | Shannon Clark | def. | Thaiany Lopes | Technical Submission (bulldog choke) | 2 | 2:12 | (Note: For the vacant LFA Women's Flyweight Championship.) |
| Light Heavyweight | Joe Taylor | def. | Gabriel Thimoteo | Decision (unanimous) (30–27, 30–27, 30–27) | 3 | 5:00 |
| Women's Bantamweight | Sierra Dinwoodie | def. | Hope Chase | Decision (unanimous) (29–28, 29–27, 29–27) | 3 | 5:00 |
| Middleweight | Liam Anderson | def. | Maurice Morris | KO (head kick) | 1 | 1:24 | (Note: Morris missed weight (188.4 lbs)) |
Preliminary card (LFA Fight Network)
| Welterweight | Farman Hasanov | def. | Luke Roberts | Decision (unanimous) (30–27, 30–27, 30–27) | 3 | 5:00 |
| Welterweight | Luis Francischinelli | def. | Ken Burrs | TKO (knee and punches) | 1 | 4:12 |
| Lightweight | Levan Khabalaev | def. | Nikolay Plazinskiy | KO (punches) | 1 | 2:55 |
| Light Heavyweight | Corey Norman | def. | Darryl Booker | TKO (punches) | 2 | 3:17 | (Note: Booker missed weight (206.6 lbs)) |

== LFA 178: Satybaldiev vs. Assis ==
LFA 178: Satybaldiev vs. Assis
- Promotion: Legacy Fighting Alliance
- Date: March 8, 2024
- Venue: Kaiser Permanente Arena
- City: Santa Cruz, California, United States

LFA 178: Satybaldiev vs. Assis was a mixed martial arts event promoted by Legacy Fighting Alliance and that took place on March 8, 2024, at Kaiser Permanente Arena in Santa Cruz, California, United States. It aired on UFC Fight Pass.

=== Background ===
An interim LFA Light Heavyweight Championship bout between Uran Satybaldiev and Bruno Assis headlined the event.

=== Fight Card ===
Main Card (UFC Fight Pass)
| Weight class | | | | Method | Round | Time | Notes |
|---|---|---|---|---|---|---|---|
| Light Heavyweight | Uran Satybaldiev | def. | Bruno Assis | TKO (punches) | 4 | 3:27 | (Note: For the interim LFA Light Heavyweight Championship.) |
| Welterweight | Jeff Creighton | def. | Miguel Jacob | Decision (unanimous) (29–28, 29–28, 29–27) | 3 | 5:00 |
| Welterweight | Diego Bianchini | def. | Bakhromjon Mashrapov | Submission (armbar) | 1 | 1:48 |
| Bantamweight | Stav Koren | def. | Hussain Bakhsh Safari | TKO (punches) | 1 | 2:27 |
| Light Heavyweight | Ozzy Diaz | def. | Chuck Campbell | KO (punches) | 1 | 4:59 |
| Welterweight | Jean-Paul Lebosnoyani | def. | Adam Wamsley | KO (punches) | 1 | 3:46 |
Preliminary card (LFA Fight Network)
| Bantamweight | David Solorzano | def. | Cristian Giovannie | Decision (unanimous) (30–27, 30–27, 30–27) | 3 | 5:00 |
| Welterweight | Ueslei Alves Oliveira | def. | Jacob Horton | KO (punches) | 1 | 2:52 |
| Lightweight | Israel Delgado | def. | Davaajamts Batsuren | Decision (unanimous) (30–27, 30–27, 30–27) | 3 | 5:00 | (Note: Delgado missed weight (155.4 lbs)) |
| Bantamweight | Chase Whitmer | def. | James Guidry | TKO (referee stoppage) | 2 | 5:00 | (Note: Guidry missed weight (141.8 lbs)) |
| Lightweight | Edmund Kwan | def. | Aris Arguello | Submission (armbar) | 1 | 3:06 |

== LFA 179: Neto vs. Antunes ==
LFA 179: Neto vs. Antunes
- Promotion: Legacy Fighting Alliance
- Date: March 23, 2024
- Venue: Parque Olimpico
- City: Rio de Janeiro, Brazil

LFA 179: Neto vs. Antunes was a mixed martial arts event promoted by Legacy Fighting Alliance and that take place on March 23, 2024, at the Parque Olimpico in Rio de Janeiro, Brazil. It aired on UFC Fight Pass.

=== Background ===
A LFA Welterweight Championship bout between reigning champion Geraldo Neto and top contender Vanilto Antunes headlined the event.

=== Fight Card ===
Main Card (UFC Fight Pass)
| Weight class | | | | Method | Round | Time | Notes |
|---|---|---|---|---|---|---|---|
| Welterweight | Vanilto Antunes | def. | Geraldo Neto (c) | TKO (punches) | 1 | 3:41 | (Note: For the LFA Welterweight Championship.) |
| Featherweight | José Delano | def. | Alan Villalba | Submission (rear-naked choke) | 1 | 4:55 |
| Featherweight | Felipe Oliveira | def. | Caio Machado | Decision (unanimous) (29–28, 29–28, 29–28) | 3 | 5:00 |
| Welterweight | Michael Oliveira | def. | Dallys Moraes Gama | TKO (head kick and punches) | 3 | 4:47 |
| Bantamweight | João Pedro Saldanha | def. | Erick Viscondi | Submission (guillotine choke) | 1 | 3:08 |
| Welterweight | Richard Martins | def. | Augusto Matias | KO (punch) | 2 | 4:11 |
Preliminary card (LFA Fight Network)
| Bantamweight | Mateus Soares | def. | Alexandre Junior | KO (punches) | 3 | 0:59 |
| Flyweight | Luiz Felipe Herculano | def. | Werick Douglas | KO (punches) | 1 | 0:16 |
| Heavyweight | Lucas Camacho | def. | Carlos Sena | TKO (punches) | 2 | 4:51 |
| Lightweight | João Moraes | def. | Esteferson da Silva | KO (punch to the Body) | 1 | 2:43 |

== LFA 180: Lawrence vs. Ward ==
LFA 180: Lawrence vs. Ward
- Promotion: Legacy Fighting Alliance
- Date: March 29, 2024
- Venue: Broadbent Arena
- City: Louisville, Kentucky, United States

LFA 180: Lawrence vs. Ward was a mixed martial arts event promoted by Legacy Fighting Alliance and that took place on March 29, 2024, at the Broadbent Arena in Louisville, Kentucky, United States. It aired on UFC Fight Pass.

=== Background ===
A flyweight bout between Kevin Fernandez and Igor Siqueira was scheduled to headline the event. However, Fernandez withdrew from his bout with an injury. As a result, a featherweight bout between Lance Lawrence and Landry Ward was promoted to main event status.

=== Results ===
Main Card (UFC Fight Pass)
| Weight class | | | | Method | Round | Time | Notes |
|---|---|---|---|---|---|---|---|
| Featherweight | Lance Lawrence | def. | Landry Ward | Decision (unanimous) (30–27, 29–28, 29–28) | 3 | 5:00 |
| Lightweight | Richie Miranda | def. | Kegan Agnew | Decision (unanimous) (29–28, 29–28, 30–27) | 3 | 5:00 |
| Welterweight | Victor Valenzuela | def. | Dustin Parrish | TKO (leg kick and punches) | 1 | 2:43 |
| Bantamweight | Kibedy Gordon | def. | Angelo Robles | Decision (unanimous) (29–28, 29–28, 29–28) | 3 | 5:00 |
| Light Heavyweight | Alik Lorenz | def. | Ben Parrish | TKO (punches and elbows) | 1 | 4:15 |
| Flyweight | Joshua Perreira | def. | Jesse Martinelli | TKO (knee and punches) | 2 | 1:43 |
Preliminary card (LFA Fight Network)
| Women's Strawweight | Chelsea Conner | def. | Alandria Rosales | Decision (unanimous) (30–27, 29–28, 29–28) | 3 | 5:00 |
| Featherweight | Ethan Burmingham | def. | Justin Thompson | TKO (knee injury) | 1 | 1:38 | (Note: Burmingham missed weight (148.6 lb).) |
| Women's Flyweight | Nejra Repp | def. | Whittany Pyles | TKO (punches) | 1 | 4:27 |
| Middleweight | Ben Fowler | def. | Trae Cusac | TKO (punches) | 2 | 2:38 |
| Light Heavyweight | Emilio Vallecillo | def. | Taylor Meister | Decision (unanimous) (30–27, 30–27, 30–27) | 3 | 5:00 |
Amateur bouts
| Featherweight | Blake Alvey | def. | Hayden Russell | Submission (rear-naked choke) | 3 | 2:34 |
| Heavyweight | Charlie Cleveland | def. | Alexander Collett | TKO (punches) | 1 | 1:53 |

== LFA 181: Siqueira vs. Hernandez ==
LFA 181: Harris vs. Hernandez
- Promotion: Legacy Fighting Alliance
- Date: April 5, 2024
- Venue: Mystic Lake Casino Hotel
- City: Prior Lake, Minnesota, United States

LFA 181: Siqueira vs. Hernandez was a mixed martial arts event promoted by Legacy Fighting Alliance and that took place on April 5, 2024, at Mystic Lake Casino Hotel in Prior Lake, Minnesota, United States. It aired on UFC Fight Pass.

=== Background ===
A LFA Flyweight Championship bout between reigning champion Eduardo "Chapolin" Henrique and undefeated contender (7–0) Eimar Hernandez was scheduled to headline the event. However, Henrique withdrew due to injury and was replaced by Jordan Harris, which the bout was being the interim title. In turn, Harris was replaced by Igor Siqueira for unknown reason.

=== Fight Card ===
Main Card (UFC Fight Pass)
| Weight class | | | | Method | Round | Time | Notes |
|---|---|---|---|---|---|---|---|
| Flyweight | Igor Siqueira | def. | Eimar Hernandez | KO (punch) | 1 | 1:07 | (Note: For the interim LFA Flyweight Championship.) |
| Bantamweight | Quang Le | def. | Tial Thang | KO (punch) | 1 | 2:47 |
| Featherweight | Shaheen Santana | def. | Isaac Thomson | Decision (split) (29–28, 28–29, 29–28) | 3 | 5:00 |
| Bantamweight | Santos Verdinez | def. | Keegan Witbeck | Decision (unanimous) (30–27, 30–27, 30–27) | 3 | 5:00 |
| Middleweight | Wes Schultz | def. | Adland Benson | KO (punches) | 1 | 3:39 |
| Heavyweight | Alvin Hines | def. | Justin Smith | Decision (unanimous) (30–27, 30–27, 29–28) | 3 | 5:00 |
Preliminary card (LFA Fight Network)
| Heavyweight | Steven Asplund | def. | Larry Gonzales | Decision (unanimous) (30–27, 30–27, 30–26) | 3 | 5:00 |
| Lightweight | Mark Choinski | def. | Noah Lindsey | Submission (armbar) | 1 | 4:57 |
| Women's Strawweight | Jayde Sheeley | def. | Hannah Brobyskov | Submission (rear-naked choke) | 1 | 3:34 |
| Featherweight | Kurtis Ellis | def. | Canon Swanson | KO (punches) | 1 | 0:24 |
| Lightweight | Kelton Sneve | def. | Davion Trotter | Decision (unanimous) (30–27, 30–27, 30–27) | 3 | 5:00 | (Note: Sneve missed weight (158.6 lb).) |
| Catchweight (150 lb) | Griffin Parriott | def. | Michael Banks | Submission (rear-naked choke) | 1 | 2:21 |
Amateur bouts
| Lightweight | Dalan Jones | def. | Zach Gehl | TKO (punches) | 1 | 0:42 |

== LFA 182: McKee vs. Hernandez ==
LFA 182: McKee vs. Hernandez
- Promotion: Legacy Fighting Alliance
- Date: April 26, 2024
- Venue: Sanford Pentagon
- City: Sioux Falls, South Dakota, United States

LFA 182: McKee vs. Hernandez was a mixed martial arts event promoted by Legacy Fighting Alliance and that took place on April 26, 2024, at the Sanford Pentagon in Sioux Falls, South Dakota, United States. It aired on UFC Fight Pass.

=== Background ===
The main event featured a bantamweight bout between Mitchell McKee (5-0) and Jose Hernandez (4-1).

=== Fight Card ===
Main Card (UFC Fight Pass)
| Weight class | | | | Method | Round | Time | Notes |
|---|---|---|---|---|---|---|---|
| Bantamweight | Mitchell McKee | def. | Jose Hernandez | Decision (unanimous) (30–27, 29–27, 30–26) | 3 | 5:00 | (Note: Hernandez missed weight (137 lb).) |
| Catchweight (140 lb) | Khasein Shaikhaev | def. | Michel Lima | Decision (split) (28–29, 30–27, 30–27) | 3 | 5:00 | (Note: Shaikhaev missed weight (144.4 lb).) |
| Lightweight | Nikita Kulshin | def. | Cedric Gunnison | Decision (unanimous) (29–28, 29–28, 29–28) | 3 | 5:00 |
| Flyweight | Nate Smith | def. | Christian Ynastrilla | TKO (punches) | 1 | 0:34 | (Note: Smith missed weight (126.6 lb).) |
| Lightweight | Michael Blockhus | def. | Jonathan Griffin | TKO (elbows and punches) | 1 | 4:13 |
| Women's Strawweight | Kendra McIntyre | def. | Katarina Legorreta | KO (head kick) | 3 | 3:00 |
Preliminary card (LFA Fight Network)
| Women's Flyweight | Cheyanne Bowers | def. | Naomie Young | TKO (punches) | 2 | 4:36 |
| Welterweight | James Martin | def. | M, A, Yah II | Submission (triangle choke) | 3 | 2:01 |
| Flyweight | Shad Walters | def. | Nicholas Gjelaj | KO (punch) | 1 | 0:11 | (Note: Walters missed weight (128.4 lb).) |
| Welterweight | Jeff Nielsen | def. | Zeb Vincent | TKO (punches) | 1 | 2:17 |
Amateur bouts
| Light Heavyweight | Tavlin Hunt | vs. | Sean Krebbs | Submission (arm-triangle choke) | 1 | 1:33 |

== LFA 183: Cantanhede vs. Guimarães ==
LFA 183: Cantanhede vs. Guimarães
- Promotion: Legacy Fighting Alliance
- Date: May 3, 2024
- Venue: Complexo Ribalta
- City: Rio de Janeiro, Brazil

LFA 183: Cantanhede vs. Guimarães was a mixed martial arts event promoted by Legacy Fighting Alliance and that took place on May 3, 2024, at Complexo Ribalta in Rio de Janeiro, Brazil. It aired on UFC Fight Pass.

=== Background ===
The main event featured a women’s strawweight showdown between Naizi Cantanhede (7-0) and Yasmin Guimarães (7-1).

=== Fight Card ===
Main Card (UFC Fight Pass)
| Weight class | | | | Method | Round | Time | Notes |
|---|---|---|---|---|---|---|---|
| Women's Strawweight | Yasmin Guimarães | def. | Naizi Cantanhede | Decision (unanimous) (30–27, 30–27, 29–28) | 3 | 5:00 |
| Middleweight | Lucas Fernando | def. | João Paulo Silva | Decision (unanimous) (29–28, 29–28, 29–28) | 3 | 5:00 |
| Bantamweight | Vinicius Pires | def. | Marlon Basílio | KO (punch) | 1 | 3:46 |
| Lightweight | Gabriel Costa | def. | Cristiano França | Submission (rear-naked choke) | 3 | 3:10 |
| Lightweight | Marcelo Marques | def. | Gustavo Henrique | Submission (armbar) | 1 | 2:46 |
| Heavyweight | Tallison Teixeira | def. | Matheus Fonseca | KO (head kick and punches) | 1 | 1:55 |
Preliminary card (LFA Fight Network)
| Women's Strawweight | Natalia Alves | def. | Adriele Castro | Decision (split) (29–28, 27–30, 29–28) | 3 | 5:00 |
| Flyweight | Lincon Santos | def. | Renildo Monteiro | KO (punch) | 3 | 4:59 |
| Catchweight (138 lbs) | João Lucas da Costa | def. | Kauã Fernandes | Decision (split) (29–28, 28–29, 29–28) | 3 | 5:00 |
| Women's Strawweight | Gabriela Fujimoto | def. | Claudia Alves | Decision (majority) (28–28, 29–27, 29–27) | 3 | 5:00 |
| Women's Flyweight | Beatriz Consuli | def. | Patrícia Batista | Decision (unanimous) (30–26, 30–27, 30–27) | 3 | 5:00 |
| Women's Bantamweight | Leidiane Fernandes | def. | Djulia Ariana | KO (punch) | 1 | 3:46 |

== LFA 184: Diaz vs. Lewis ==
LFA 184: Diaz vs. Lewis
- Promotion: Legacy Fighting Alliance
- Date: May 17, 2024
- Venue: Commerce Casino & Hotel
- City: Commerce, California, United States

LFA 184: Diaz vs. Lewis was a mixed martial arts event promoted by Legacy Fighting Alliance and that took place on May 17, 2024, at Commerce Casino & Hotel in Commerce, California, United States. It aired on UFC Fight Pass.

=== Background ===
The main event featured a light heavyweight bout between former LFA Middleweight Champion Ozzy Diaz and Bevon Lewis.

=== Fight Card ===
Main Card (UFC Fight Pass)
| Weight class | | | | Method | Round | Time | Notes |
|---|---|---|---|---|---|---|---|
| Light Heavyweight | Ozzy Diaz | def. | Bevon Lewis | TKO (punches) | 2 | 3:24 |
| Catchweight (148 lb) | Javier Reyes Rugeles | def. | Chase Gibson | TKO (punches and elbows) | 3 | 1:29 |
| Welterweight | Jean-Paul Lebosnoyani | def. | Victor Kuiks | Decision (unanimous) (29–28, 30–27, 30–27) | 3 | 5:00 |
| Featherweight | Lerryan Douglas | def. | Nathan Ghareeb | KO (punches) | 2 | 0:45 |
| Flyweight | Cody Davis | def. | Rodney Kealohi | Decision (split) (29–28, 28–29, 29–28) | 3 | 5:00 |
| Flyweight | Gilbert Nakatani | def. | Gabriel Gomes | TKO (punches) | 2 | 3:02 |
Preliminary card (LFA Fight Network)
| Middleweight | Jake Woodley | def. | Oseyiomon Oiyemhonlan | Submission (rear-naked choke) | 3 | 3:20 |
| Welterweight | Luis Francischinelli | def. | Greg Sun | KO (punch) | 1 | 0:50 |
| Women's Flyweight | Mariana Poltronieri Piccolo | def. | Taylor Mauldin | Submission (face crank) | 1 | 4:33 |

== LFA 185: Gennrich vs. Lewis ==
LFA 185: Gennrich vs. Lewis
- Promotion: Legacy Fighting Alliance
- Date: June 7, 2024
- Venue: Horseshoe Hammond
- City: Hammond, Indiana, United States

LFA 185: Gennrich vs. Lewis was a mixed martial arts event promoted by Legacy Fighting Alliance and that took place on June 7, 2024, at Horseshoe Hammond in Hammond, Indiana, United States. It aired on UFC Fight Pass.

=== Background ===
A LFA Lightweight Championship bout between current champion Kegan Gennrich and Richie Lewis headlined the event. While an interim LFA Women's Strawweight Championship bout between interim champion (also 2016 Olympic bronze medalist in judo) Natalia Kuziutina and Bruna Ellen was expected to serve as the co-main event. However, Kuziutina was forced to withdraw at the last minute due to illness and the bout was cancelled.

=== Fight Card ===
Main card (UFC Fight Pass)
| Weight class | | | | Method | Round | Time | Notes |
|---|---|---|---|---|---|---|---|
| Lightweight | Richie Lewis | def. | Kegan Gennrich (c) | Decision (unanimous) (48–47, 50–45, 50–45) | 5 | 5:00 | (Note: For the LFA Lightweight Championship.) |
| Featherweight | Jose Ferreira | def. | Cássio Junior | TKO (elbows) | 2 | 4:03 | (Note: Ferreira missed weight (150.6 lb).) |
| Welterweight | Joey Hart | def. | Tyler Scott | KO (knee) | 1 | 2:30 |
| Welterweight | Sanon Sadeck | def. | Paul Kimble | Decision (unanimous) (30–27, 29–28, 29–28) | 3 | 5:00 |
| Bantamweight | John Beckett | def. | Zach Vaci | Decision (split) (29–28, 28–29, 29–28) | 3 | 5:00 |
Preliminary card (LFA Fight Network)
| Flyweight | Miguel Sanson | def. | Jordan Burkholder | Decision (unanimous) (30–27, 30–27, 29–28) | 3 | 5:00 |
| Featherweight | Alberto Rodriguez | def. | Cauatã Samuel | Decision (unanimous) (29–28, 29–28, 29–27) | 3 | 5:00 | (Note: Samuel missed weight (146.6 lb).) |
| Lightweight | Matthew Leonard | def. | Isaiah Flores | Decision (unanimous) (30–27, 30–27, 29–28) | 3 | 5:00 |
| Lightweight | Mauricio Rodriguez | def. | Brian Akins | Submission (armbar) | 2 | 4:46 |
Amateur bouts
| Lightweight | Luis Unzueta | def. | Daniel Jeschke | Decision (unanimous) (30–27, 29–28, 29–28) | 3 | 3:00 |

== LFA 186: Bekoev vs. Foxworth ==
LFA 186: Bekoev vs. Foxworth
- Promotion: Legacy Fighting Alliance
- Date: June 22, 2024
- Venue: Magness Arena
- City: Denver, Colorado, United States

LFA 186: Bekoev vs. Foxworth was a mixed martial arts event promoted by Legacy Fighting Alliance and that took place on June 22, 2024, at the Magness Arena in Denver, Colorado, United States. It aired on UFC Fight Pass.

=== Background ===
A LFA Middleweight Championship bout between current champion Azamat Bekoev and Chauncey Foxworth headlined the event.

=== Fight Card ===
Main card (UFC Fight Pass)
| Weight class | | | | Method | Round | Time | Notes |
|---|---|---|---|---|---|---|---|
| Middleweight | Azamat Bekoev (c) | def. | Chauncey Foxworth | KO (punch) | 2 | 4:32 | (Note: For the LFA Middleweight Championship.) |
| Women's Flyweight | Veronika Borisova | def. | Nejra Repp | Decision (unanimous) (30–27, 29–28, 29–28) | 3 | 5:00 |
| Heavyweight | Benjamin Bennett | def. | Luis Iniguez | Decision (unanimous) (30–27, 30–27, 30–27) | 3 | 5:0 |
| Featherweight | David Mgoyan | def. | A.J. Robb | TKO (doctor stoppage) | 1 | 4:30 |
| Welterweight | Ty Miller | def. | Ryan Charlebois | KO (punch) | 1 | 0:45 |
| Catchweight (150 lb) | Carlos Calderon | def. | Kurtis Ellis | Submission (rear-naked choke) | 1 | 2:31 | (Note: Ellis missed weight (152.6 lb).) |
Preliminary card (LFA Fight Network)
| Welterweight | Dante Schiro | def. | Austin Jones | Decision (split) (29–28, 28–29, 29–28) | 3 | 5:00 |
| Women's Strawweight | Sidney Trillo | def. | Brittany Camozzi | Submission (rear-naked choke) | 1 | 2:40 |
| Catchweight (140 lb) | Elias Rodriguez | def. | Carlos Rivera | Submission (rear-naked choke) | 2 | 4:57 |
| Featherweight | Alexander St. Charles | def. | Nick Montez | Technical Submission (brabo choke) | 2 | 2:06 |
| Flyweight | Aaron Beltran | def. | Aeneas Renfrow | Decision (unanimous) (30–27, 30–25, 30–26) | 3 | 5:00 |
| Featherweight | James Romero | def. | Chaz Polson | Submission (rear-naked choke) | 2 | 1:13 |
Amateur bouts
| Catchweight (140 lb) | Elie Wise | def. | Andrew Peltier | Decision (unanimous) (30–27, 30–27, 30–27) | 3 | 5:00 |

== LFA 187: Brazil vs. Latin America ==
LFA 187: Brazil vs. Latin America
- Promotion: Legacy Fighting Alliance
- Date: July 6, 2024
- Venue: Ginásio do Polvilho
- City: São Paulo, Brazil

LFA 187: Brazil vs. Latin America was a mixed martial arts event promoted by Legacy Fighting Alliance and that took place on July 6, 2024, at the Ginásio do Polvilho in São Paulo, Brazil. It aired on UFC Fight Pass.

=== Background ===
A welterweight bout between former LFA Welterweight Champion Carlos Leal and Jose Barrios was expected to headline the event. However, Barrios pulled out and was replaced by Manuel Mena.

=== Fight card ===
Fight card (UFC Fight Pass)
| Weight class | | | | Method | Round | Time | Notes |
|---|---|---|---|---|---|---|---|
| Welterweight | Carlos Leal | def. | Manuel Mena | TKO (punches) | 1 | 3:09 | (Note: Mena missed weight (175.6 lb).) |
| Flyweight | Marcos Degli | def. | Ignacio Fernandez | TKO (punches) | 1 | 4:32 | (Note: Degli missed weight (128.6 lb).) |
| Lightweight | Samuel Dias | def. | Renzo Cortti | TKO (punches) | 1 | 0:39 |
| Featherweight | Inglesson de Lara | def. | Lucas Miletich | Decision (unanimous) (30–27, 30–27, 30–27) | 3 | 5:00 |
| Catchweight (140 lb) | Lionel Abojer | def. | Apollo Gomes | Submission (rear-naked choke) | 2 | 1:37 |
| Featherweight | Pedro Doreto | def. | Leandro Sloano | TKO (retirement) | 1 | 5:00 |
| Women's Strawweight | Aieza Ramos Bertolso | def. | Alejandra Fernandez | TKO (punches) | 3 | 3:19 |
Preliminary card (LFA Fight Network)
| Flyweight | Hugo Paiva | def. | Rodrigo Roldan | KO (punches) | 1 | 3:18 |
| Middleweight | Vladimir Calvo Marrero | def. | Leonardo Mesquita | Decision (unanimous) (30–27, 30–27, 30–26) | 3 | 5:00 |
| Women's Strawweight | Edilania da Silva | def. | Pâmela Mara Assis | Decision (unanimous) (30–27, 30–27, 30–27) | 3 | 5:00 |
| Featherweight | Eduardo Dutra | def. | Abraham Racho | Decision (unanimous) (30–27, 30–27, 30–26) | 3 | 5:00 |
| Lightweight | João Moraes | def. | Navir Gonzalez | Decision (unanimous) (30–27, 30–27, 30–27) | 3 | 5:00 |
| Heavyweight | Guilherme Uriel | def. | Weslley Álec | Technical Submission (guillotine choke) | 1 | 0:29 |
| Women's Strawweight | Nawira Ferreira | def. | Fabrizia Ketlinn | Decision (unanimous) (29–28, 29–28, 29–28) | 3 | 5:00 |
| Lightweight | Matheus Felipe | def. | Alexandre Duarte | Decision (unanimous) (30–27, 30–27, 30–27) | 3 | 5:00 |

== LFA 188: Sweeney vs. do Nascimento ==
LFA 188: Sweeney vs. do Nascimento
- Promotion: Legacy Fighting Alliance
- Date: July 12, 2024
- Venue: Wild Horse Pass Casino
- City: Chandler, Arizona, United States

LFA 188: Sweeney vs. do Nascimento was a mixed martial arts event promoted by Legacy Fighting Alliance and that took place on July 12, 2024, at the Wild Horse Pass Casino in Chandler, Arizona, United States. It aired on UFC Fight Pass.

=== Background ===
A LFA Bantamweight Championship bout between then champion John Sweeney and Rafael do Nascimento is expected to headline the event. At the weigh-ins, Sweeney came in at 141.4 lb, 6.4 pounds over the bantamweight limit for a title fight. As a result, Sweeney was stripped of the title and only do Nascimento was eligible to win it.

=== Fight card ===
Fight card (UFC Fight Pass)
| Weight class | | | | Method | Round | Time | Notes |
|---|---|---|---|---|---|---|---|
| Bantamweight | John Sweeney | def. | Rafael do Nascimento | Decision (unanimous) (50–45, 50–45, 49–46) | 5 | 5:00 | (Note: For the vacant LFA Bantamweight Championship. Sweeney missed weight (141.4 lb) and was stripped of the title. Only do Nascimento was eligible to win the title.) |
| Bantamweight | Kasey Tanner | def. | Thiago Belo | Submission (rear-naked choke) | 1 | 3:52 |
| Featherweight | José Miguel Delgado | def. | Lucas Faria | KO (punches) | 1 | 1:20 |
| Women's Strawweight | Leslie Hernandez | def. | Jade Jorand | Decision (unanimous) (29–28, 29–28, 29–28) | 3 | 5:00 |
| Lightweight | Stanley Dorsainvil | def. | Cedric Katambwa | Decision (unanimous) (30–27, 30–27, 30–27) | 3 | 5:00 |
| Light Heavyweight | Alik Lorenz | def. | Thomas Powell | TKO (punches) | 1 | 3:35 |
Preliminary card (LFA Fight Network)
| Lightweight | Ilay Barzilay | def. | Christobal Renteria | KO (punches) | 1 | 2:44 |
| Flyweight | Chance Ikei | def. | Ryan Kim | Decision (unanimous) (30–27, 30–27, 30–26) | 3 | 5:00 |
| Flyweight | Lívio Ribeiro | def. | Mauro Gutierrez | Decision (unanimous) (30–27, 30–27, 30–27) | 3 | 5:00 |
| Middleweight | Eric Fimbres | def. | Montè Ogbonna-Morrison | Decision (unanimous) (30–27, 29–28, 29–28) | 3 | 5:00 |
| Welterweight | Jeremiah Robinson | def. | Johan Rodríguez | Decision (unanimous) (29–28, 29–28, 29–28) | 3 | 5:90 |
| Heavyweight | Brent Campbell | def. | Leon Mackey Jr. | TKO (punches) | 2 | 4:14 |
| Women's Strawweight | Quinn Williams | def. | Miriam Nazar | Technical Submission (rear-naked choke) | 2 | 0:51 |

== LFA 189: Kuziutina vs. Ellen ==
LFA 189: Kuziutina vs. Ellen
- Promotion: Legacy Fighting Alliance
- Date: August 2, 2024
- Venue: Seneca Allegany Resort & Casino
- City: Salamanca, New York, United States

LFA 189: Kuziutina vs. Ellen is a mixed martial arts event promoted by Legacy Fighting Alliance and that will take place on August 2, 2024, at Seneca Allegany Resort & Casino in Salamanca, New York, United States. It aired on UFC Fight Pass.

=== Background ===
An interim LFA Women's Strawweight Championship bout between interim champion (also 2016 Olympic bronze medalist in judo) Natalia Kuziutina and Bruna Ellen headlined the event. They were originally scheduled to meet at LFA 185 in June 2024, but Kuziutina was forced to withdraw at the last minute due to illness.

=== Fight card ===
Fight card (UFC Fight Pass)
| Weight class | | | | Method | Round | Time | Notes |
|---|---|---|---|---|---|---|---|
| Women's Strawweight | Natalia Kuziutina (ic) | def. | Bruna Ellen | Decision (unanimous) (50–45, 49–46, 50–45) | 5 | 5:00 | (Note: For the interim LFA Women's Strawweight Championship.) |
| Lightweight | Ilyor Bakhtiyar Uulu | def. | James Gonzalez | TKO (knees) | 1 | 2:59 | (Note: Bakhtiyar Uulu missed weight (156.6 lb).) |
| Catchweight (142 lb) | Micaias Ureña | def. | Ashiek Ajim | KO (punches) | 1 | 0:11 |
| Heavyweight | Matthew Adams | def. | Alex Marro | TKO (punches) | 1 | 0:42 | (Note: Adams missed weight (268.4 lb).) |
| Catchweight (180 lb) | Marc-Ari Lewis | def. | Everet Desilets | Decision (unanimous) (30–26, 30–27, 30–27) | 3 | 5:00 |
Preliminary card (LFA Fight Network)
| Women's Strawweight | Cristina Brador | def. | Aline David | Submission (rear-naked choke) | 1 | 3:07 |
| Featherweight | Soufiane Kabil | def. | Michael Pino | Decision (unanimous) (30–27, 30–27, 30–26) | 3 | 5:00 |
Amateur bouts
| Welterweight | Melvin Jovel | def. | Xander White | Submission (rear-naked choke) | 3 | 2:43 |
| Featherweight | Luke Martin | def. | Devon Coates | Decision (unanimous) (30–27, 30–27, 30–27) | 3 | 3:00 |

== LFA 190: Chapolin vs. Siqueira ==
LFA 190: Chapolin vs. Siqueira
- Promotion: Legacy Fighting Alliance
- Date: August 23, 2024
- Venue: Commerce Casino & Hotel
- City: Commerce, California, United States

LFA 190: Chapolin vs. Siqueira was a mixed martial arts event promoted by Legacy Fighting Alliance and that took place on August 23, 2024, at Commerce Casino & Hotel in Commerce, California, United States. It will be aired on UFC Fight Pass.

=== Background ===
A LFA Flyweight Championship unification bout between current champion Eduardo Chapolin and interim champion Igor Siqueira headlined the event.

An interim LFA Featherweight Championship bout between Lerryan Douglas and Javier Reyes took place at the co-main event.

=== Results ===
Fight card (UFC Fight Pass)
| Weight class | | | | Method | Round | Time | Notes |
|---|---|---|---|---|---|---|---|
| Flyweight | Eduardo Chapolin (c) | def. | Igor Siqueira (ic) | KO (punches) | 1 | 1:26 | (Note: For the LFA Flyweight Championship.) |
| Featherweight | Lerryan Douglas | def. | Javier Reyes | KO (punch) | 2 | 2:56 | (Note: For the interim LFA Featherweight Championship.) |
| Flyweight | Gilbert Nakatani | def. | Jordan Harris | Decision (unanimous) (29–28, 29–28, 29–28) | 3 | 5:00 | (Note: Harris missed weight (129.4 lb).) |
| Flyweight | Cody Davis | def. | Luis Rodríguez | TKO (punches and elbows) | 3 | 4:44 |
| Lightweight | Richie Miranda | def. | Maycon Mendonça | Decision (unanimous) (29–28, 29–28, 29–28) | 3 | 5:00 |
| Women's Strawweight | Ashley Yoder | def. | Gloria de Paula | Decision (unanimous) (30–27, 30–27, 30–27) | 3 | 5:00 |
Preliminary card (LFA Fight Network)
| Welterweight | Miguel Jacob | def. | Danny Ramirez | TKO (punches) | 2 | 4:57 |
| Welterweight | Luis Francischinelli | def. | Victor Kuiks | KO (punch) | 1 | 3:20 |
| Flyweight | Adrian Garcia | def. | Daniel Park | Decision (unanimous) (30–27, 30–27, 30–27) | 3 | 5:00 | (Note: Garcia missed weight (127.8 lb).) |
| Women's Flyweight | Mariana Poltronieri Piccolo | def. | Gabriella Gulfin | Decision (unanimous) (29–28, 29–28, 30–27) | 3 | 5:00 |
| Bantamweight | Chase Whitmer | def. | Aiden Ingram | TKO (punches) | 2 | 3:07 |

== LFA 191: Prado vs. Lopes ==
LFA 191: Prado vs. Lopes
- Promotion: Legacy Fighting Alliance
- Date: August 30, 2024
- Venue: Ginásio do Povilho
- City: Cajamar, Brazil

LFA 191: Prado vs. Lopes was a mixed martial arts event promoted by Legacy Fighting Alliance that took place on August 30, 2024, at the Ginásio do Povilho in Cajamar, Brazil. It will be aired on UFC Fight Pass.

=== Background ===
A featherweight bout between Wellington Prado and Keweny Lopes headlined the event.

=== Fight card ===
Fight card (UFC Fight Pass)
| Weight class | | | | Method | Round | Time | Notes |
|---|---|---|---|---|---|---|---|
| Featherweight | Keweny Lopes | def. | Wellington Prado | KO (punches) | 1 | 1:34 |
| Middleweight | Lucas Fernando | def. | Pedro Oliveira | Decision (unanimous) (29–27, 29–28, 29–28) | 3 | 5:00 |
| Bantamweight | Michel da Cruz Lima | def. | Luan Matheus | TKO (body kick and punches) | 1 | 4:16 |
| Flyweight | Lincon Santos | def. | Kleberson Sousa | Submission (heel hook) | 1 | 3:08 |
| Women's Strawweight | Gabriela Fujimoto | def. | Maria Luiza de Abreu | TKO (punches) | 3 | 2:28 |
| Bantamweight | Rafael Pereira | def. | João Lucas da Costa | Decision (unanimous) (29–27, 29–28, 30–27) | 3 | 5:00 |
Preliminary card (LFA Fight Network)
| Bantamweight | Mateus Soares | def. | Mackson Lee | Submission (brabo choke) | 2 | 4:14 |
| Featherweight | Luan Pedroso | def. | Demison Rodrigues | TKO (spinning wheel kick and punches) | 1 | 0:34 |
| Bantamweight | Marcos Aurélio | def. | Andrey Silva | KO (punch) | 1 | 3:18 |
| Heavyweight | Guilherme Pat | def. | Mauricio Queiroz | TKO (punches) | 3 | 3:13 |
| Bantamweight | Giovanni Garcia | def. | Jenilto Matos | TKO (punches) | 1 | 3:45 |
| Women's Flyweight | Ruth Pereira | def. | Amanda Vargas | Decision (unanimous) (30–27, 30–27, 30–26) | 3 | 5:00 |
| Lightweight | Felipe Guidani | def. | Jhon Bryan | Decision (unanimous) (29–27, 29–28, 29–28) | 3 | 5:00 | (Note: Guidani missed weight (158.6 lb).) |
| Bantamweight | Hector Santiago | def. | Pedro Sousa | TKO (punches) | 1 | 3:53 |

== LFA 192: Climaco vs. Dias ==
LFA 192: Climaco vs. Dias
- Promotion: Legacy Fighting Alliance
- Date: September 13, 2024
- Venue: Kaiser Permanente Arena
- City: Santa Cruz, California, United States

LFA 192: Climaco vs. Dias was a mixed martial arts event promoted by Legacy Fighting Alliance and that took place on September 13, 2024, at Kaiser Permanente Arena in Santa Cruz, California, United States. It will be aired on UFC Fight Pass.

=== Background ===
A flyweight bout between Mark Climaco and Victor Dias headlined the event.

=== Fight card ===
Fight card (UFC Fight Pass)
| Weight class | | | | Method | Round | Time | Notes |
|---|---|---|---|---|---|---|---|
| Flyweight | Mark Climaco | def. | Victor Dias | Decision (unanimous) (29–28, 30–27, 30–27) | 3 | 5:00 |
| Bantamweight | Aziz Osorbek Uulu | def. | Filipe Esteves | Submission (rear-naked choke) | 1 | 4:47 | (Note: Osorbek Uulu missed weight (138 lb).) |
| Middleweight | Buddy Wallace | def. | Renato Valente | Decision (unanimous) (29–28, 29–28, 29–28) | 3 | 5:00 | (Note: Wallace missed weight (189.6 lb).) |
| Featherweight | Isaac Thomson | def. | Israel Delgado | Decision (unanimous) (30–27, 30–27, 30–27) | 3 | 5:00 |
| Middleweight | Theo Haig | def. | Dylan Diebitz | Submission (rear-naked choke) | 2 | 4:03 |
Preliminary card (LFA Fight Network)
| Flyweight | Braden Aupuni Pagaoa | def. | Houston Scibek | TKO (punches) | 1 | 4:36 | (Note: Pagaoa missed weight (126.6 lb).) |
| Bantamweight | Shadland Walters | def. | Jaime Mora-Muñoz | Technical Submission (guillotine choke) | 1 | 2:44 |
| Bantamweight | Corvan Allen | def. | Roger Severson | Decision (unanimous) (29–28, 29–28, 29–28) | 3 | 5:00 |

== LFA 193: Bowers vs. Borisova ==
LFA 193: Bowers vs. Borisova
- Promotion: Legacy Fighting Alliance
- Date: September 20, 2024
- Venue: Mystic Lake Casino Hotel
- City: Prior Lake, Minnesota, United States

LFA 193: Bowers vs. Borisova was a mixed martial arts event promoted by Legacy Fighting Alliance and that took place on September 20, 2024, at Mystic Lake Casino Hotel in Prior Lake, Minnesota, United States. It aired on UFC Fight Pass.

=== Background ===
An interim LFA Women's Flyweight Championship bout between Cheyanne Bowers and Veronika Borisova headlined the event.

=== Results ===
Fight card (UFC Fight Pass)
| Weight class | | | | Method | Round | Time | Notes |
|---|---|---|---|---|---|---|---|
| Women's Flyweight | Cheyanne Bowers | def. | Veronika Borisova | Submission (armbar) | 1 | 2:10 | (Note: For the interim LFA Women's Flyweight Championship.) |
| Bantamweight | Mitchell McKee | def. | Ashton Caniglia | TKO (punches) | 1 | 0:39 |
| Heavyweight | Denzel Freeman | def. | Steven Asplund | Submission (rear-naked choke) | 2 | 1:17 |
| Flyweight | Devon Lozej | def. | Nate Smith | Decision (unanimous) (30–27, 30–27, 30–27) | 3 | 5:00 | (Note: Smith missed weight (128 lb).) |
| Featherweight | Michael Blockhus | def. | Roland Pruden | Decision (unanimous) (30–27, 30–27, 30–27) | 3 | 5:00 |
| Heavyweight | Alvin Hines | def. | Taylor Escamilla | TKO (elbows) | 2 | 2:40 |
Preliminary card (LFA Fight Network)
| Catchweight (140 lb) | Santos Verdinez | def. | Felipe Martinez Donis | Submission (heel hook) | 1 | 3:24 | (Note: Donis missed weight (141 lb).) |
| Middleweight | Jackson McVey | def. | Ben Fowler | Submission (brabo choke) | 1 | 0:33 |
| Lightweight | Steve Collins | def. | Richard Daffron | TKO (punches) | 1 | 3:44 |
| Catchweight (165 lb) | Ashkan Morvari | def. | Coty Milhausen | Submission (rear-naked choke) | 2 | 4:30 |
| Catchweight (165 lb) | Danny Somers | def. | Clay Uddley | TKO (slam and punch) | 2 | 0:19 |
Amateur bouts
| Lightweight | Kendall Sandifer | def. | Mitchell Wilson | KO (punch) | 1 | 0:19 |
| Lightweight | Ryan Motley | def. | Aaron Skipitaris | Decision (unanimous) (30–26, 30–26, 30–26) | 3 | 3:00 |
| Heavyweight | Ezayah Gomez Oropeza | def. | Conor Hoy | TKO (punches) | 1 | 2:05 |
| Catchweight (150 lb) | Stephen Lesko | def. | Isaiah Joans | Technical Submission (arm-triangle choke) | 2 | 1:46 |

== LFA 194: Magomedov vs. Leyva ==
LFA 194: Magomedov vs. Leyva
- Promotion: Legacy Fighting Alliance
- Date: October 18, 2024
- Venue: Seneca Niagara Resort & Casino
- City: Niagara Falls, New York, United States

LFA 194: Magomedov vs. Leyva was a mixed martial arts event promoted by Legacy Fighting Alliance and that took place on October 18, 2024, at the Seneca Niagara Resort & Casino in Niagara Falls, New York, United States. It aired on UFC Fight Pass.

=== Background ===
An interim LFA Welterweight Championship bout between interim champion Shamidkhan Magomedov and Alfonso Leyva headlined the event.

=== Fight card ===
Fight card (UFC Fight Pass)
| Weight class | | | | Method | Round | Time | Notes |
|---|---|---|---|---|---|---|---|
| Welterweight | Shamidkhan Magomedov (ic) | def. | Alfonso Leyva | KO (punches) | 1 | 1:17 | (Note: For the interim LFA Welterweight Championship.) |
| Catchweight (157 lb) | Mirafzal Akhtamov | def. | Scottie Stockman | Submission (guillotine choke) | 1 | 0:53 |
| Featherweight | Erick Visconde | def. | Busurmankul Abdibait | Decision (unanimous) (29–28, 29–28, 29–28) | 3 | 5:00 |
| Women's Strawweight | Giovanna Canuto | def. | Ershirley Kessy | TKO (punches) | 1 | 4:03 |
| Welterweight | Austin Vanderford | def. | Victor Romero | TKO (punch and elbows) | 1 | 1:05 |
| Featherweight | Lance Lawrence | def. | Jacob Bohn | Submission (guillotine choke) | 3 | 3:41 |
| Women's Bantamweight | Beatriz Mesquita | def. | Shannel Butler | Submission (rear-naked choke) | 1 | 3:24 |
Preliminary card (LFA Fight Network)
| Heavyweight | Matt Adams | def. | Saulo Cavalari | Decision (unanimous) (29–27, 29–27, 29–27) | 3 | 5:00 |
| Lightweight | Adam Livingston | def. | Jake Hixenbaugh | TKO (punches) | 1 | 1:50 |
| Lightweight | Kevin Carrier | def. | Carlo Ricci | Submission (arm-triangle choke) | 2 | 1:56 |
| Light Heavyweight | Freddy Vidal | def. | Mike Kennedy | Decision (unanimous) (30–27, 30–27, 30–27) | 3 | 5:00 |
| Featherweight | Derrick Patterson | def. | Vincenzo Iannuzzo | Decision (unanimous) (29–28, 29–28, 29–28) | 3 | 5:00 |
Amateur bouts
| Welterweight | Brian Torres | def. | Melvin Jovel | Decision (unanimous) (29–28, 29–28, 30–27) | 3 | 3:00 |

== LFA 195: Wetzell vs. Usmonov ==
LFA 195: Wetzell vs. Usmonov
- Promotion: Legacy Fighting Alliance
- Date: October 25, 2024
- Venue: Dobson Arena
- City: Vail, Colorado, United States

LFA 195: Wetzell vs. Usmonov was a mixed martial arts event promoted by Legacy Fighting Alliance and that took place on October 25, 2024, at Dobson Arena in Vail, Colorado, United States. It aired on UFC Fight Pass.

=== Background ===
A bantamweight bout between Justin Wetzell and The Ultimate Fighter 32 alum Bekhzod Usmonov headlined the event.

=== Fight card ===
Fight card (UFC Fight Pass)
| Weight class | | | | Method | Round | Time | Notes |
|---|---|---|---|---|---|---|---|
| Bantamweight | Justin Wetzell | def. | Bekhzod Usmonov | Decision (unanimous) (29–27, 30–26, 30–26) | 3 | 5:00 |
| Welterweight | Dante Schiro | def. | A.J. Fletcher | Submission (rear-naked choke) | 2 | 1:41 |
| Flyweight | Kevin Fernandez | def. | Josiah Reyes | Decision (unanimous) (30–27, 29–28, 30–27) | 3 | 5:00 |
| Flyweight | Micah Haas | def. | Erik Calvert | Decision (unanimous) (30–27, 30–27, 30–27) | 3 | 5:00 | (Note: Haas missed weight (131 lb).) |
| Women's Strawweight | Marina Monteiro | def. | Kendra McIntyre | TKO (punches) | 2 | 2:40 |
| Women's Bantamweight | Melissa Croden | def. | Ashley Deen | TKO (knees and elbows) | 2 | 0:22 |
Preliminary card (LFA Fight Network)
| Welterweight | Haris Talundžić | def. | Ovidio Bojorquez | Submission (neck crank) | 3 | 3:04 | (Note: Talundžić missed weight (171.8 lb).) |
| Flyweight | Isiah Torres | def. | Keynan Davis | Submission (triangle choke) | 3 | 3:44 |
| Lightweight | Alix Fisher | def. | Jared Ferrera | TKO (punches) | 1 | 1:27 |
Amateur bouts
| Women's Strawweight | Leilani Hodgens | def. | DeAnna Betterman | Submission (armbar) | 2 | 1:16 |
| Light Heavyweight | Rory Light | def. | Austin Behrman | TKO (punches) | 1 | 0:53 |

== LFA 196: Tanner vs. Ureña ==
LFA 196: Tanner vs. Ureña
- Promotion: Legacy Fighting Alliance
- Date: November 8, 2024
- Venue: Arizona Financial Theatre
- City: Phoenix, Arizona, United States

LFA 196: Tanner vs. Ureña was a mixed martial arts event promoted by Legacy Fighting Alliance and that took place on November 8, 2024, at Arizona Financial Theatre in Phoenix, Arizona, United States. It aired on UFC Fight Pass.

=== Background ===
A bantamweight bout between Kasey Tanner and Micaias Ureña headlined the event.

=== Results ===
Fight card (UFC Fight Pass)
| Weight class | | | | Method | Round | Time | Notes |
|---|---|---|---|---|---|---|---|
| Bantamweight | Kasey Tanner | def. | Micaias Ureña | Decision (unanimous) (30–27, 30–27, 30–27) | 3 | 5:00 |
| Lightweight | Ednilson Santos | def. | Kamuela Kirk | Decision (unanimous) (30–27, 29–28, 29–28) | 3 | 5:00 |
| Flyweight | Furkatbek Yokubov | def. | Flavio de Queiroz | KO (spinning wheel kick and punches) | 2 | 1:10 |
| Featherweight | Iler Bakhtiyar Uulu | def. | Leonardo Morales | Submission (rear-naked choke) | 1 | 2:39 | (Note: Bakhtiyar Uulu missed weight (148.8 lb).) |
| Lightweight | JaCobi Jones | def. | Gaberial Brown | KO (punches) | 1 | 2:00 |
| Flyweight | Christian Natividad | def. | Devon Jackson | Decision (unanimous) (29–28, 29–28, 29–28) | 3 | 5:00 |
| Light Heavyweight | Alik Lorenz | def. | Ryan Parker | Submission (rear-naked choke) | 3 | 4:46 |
Preliminary card (LFA Fight Network)
| Flyweight | Chance Ikei | def. | Jacob Romero | Technical Submission (anaconda choke) | 1 | 1:42 |
| Middleweight | Adland Benson | def. | Eric Fimbres | TKO (punches) | 2 | 3:22 |
| Bantamweight | Stav Koren | def. | Peter Lucitt | Submission (rear-naked choke) | 1 | 4:14 |
| Middleweight | Thomas Keenan | def. | Chaz Polson | Submission (triangle choke) | 2 | 3:01 |
Amateur bouts
| Featherweight | Paul Marghitas | def. | Isaiah Arechiga | Decision (unanimous) (30–27, 29–28, 29–28) | 3 | 3:00 |
| Catchweight (120 lb) | Olivia Hendrickson | def. | Hannah Wagner | Decision (unanimous) (30–27, 30–27, 30–27) | 3 | 3:00 | (Note: Wagner missed weight (121.4 lb).) |
| Bantamweight | Julius Vega | def. | Kadyn Marcantel | Decision (unanimous) (30–27, 30–27, 30–27) | 3 | 3:00 |

== LFA 197: Kuziutina vs. Guimarães ==
LFA 197: Kuziutina vs. Guimarães
- Promotion: Legacy Fighting Alliance
- Date: November 22, 2024
- Venue: Ginásio do Povilho
- City: Cajamar, Brazil

LFA 197: Kuziutina vs. Guimarães was a mixed martial arts event promoted by Legacy Fighting Alliance and that took place on November 22, 2024, at the Ginásio do Povilho in Cajamar, Brazil. It aired on UFC Fight Pass.

=== Background ===
An interim LFA Women's Strawweight Championship bout between interim champion (also 2016 Olympic bronze medalist in judo) Natalia Kuziutina and Yasmin Guimarães headlined the event.

=== Results ===
Fight card (UFC Fight Pass)
| Weight class | | | | Method | Round | Time | Notes |
|---|---|---|---|---|---|---|---|
| Women's Strawweight | Natalia Kuziutina (ic) | def. | Yasmin Guimarães | Decision (unanimous) (47–45, 49–43, 48–45) | 5 | 5:00 | (Note: For the interim LFA Women's Strawweight Championship.) |
| Featherweight | Márcio Barbosa | def. | Felipe Oliveira | TKO (punches) | 1 | 2:54 | (Note: Oliveira missed weight (149.6 lb).) |
| Bantamweight | Vinicius Pires | def. | Jhon Rodríguez Tacha | Submission (triangle choke) | 2 | 4:00 |
| Heavyweight | José Augusto Azevedo | def. | Edivan Santos | TKO (punch) | 2 | 3:20 |
| Welterweight | Michael Oliveira | def. | Aldo Pereira | Decision (unanimous) (29–27, 29–27, 30–27) | 3 | 5:00 |
| Lightweight | Marcelo Marques | def. | Luann Sardinha | Decision (unanimous) (29–28, 29–28, 29–28) | 3 | 5:00 |
| Lightweight | Juan Pablo Vieira | def. | Maycon Kevin | Submission (armbar) | 1 | 0:52 |
Preliminary card (LFA Fight Network)
| Welterweight | Richard Martins | def. | Lucas Batista | TKO (punches) | 2 | 4:29 |
| Welterweight | Reginaldo Geraldo Jr. | def. | Dallys Moraes Gama | Decision (unanimous) (30–27, 30–27, 30–26) | 3 | 5:00 |
| Women's Strawweight | Aieza Ramos Bertolso | def. | Janaína Silva | Decision (unanimous) (30–27, 30–27, 30–27) | 3 | 5:00 |
| Welterweight | Ryan Gandra | def. | Vladimir Calvo Marrero | KO (punch) | 1 | 2:28 |
| Women's Bantamweight | Nicoly Pedroza | def. | Thalita Diniz | TKO (punches) | 1 | 4:25 |
| Women's Flyweight | Beatriz Consuli Diniz | def. | Thaiany Lopes | Decision (unanimous) (30–27, 30–27, 30–27) | 3 | 5:00 | (Note: Lopes missed weight (130 lb).) |
| Women's Strawweight | Ana Clara Santos | def. | Maria Vaz | TKO (punches) | 1 | 2:21 | (Note: Vaz missed weight (118 lb).) |

== LFA 198: Miranda vs. Oyarzún ==
LFA 198: Miranda vs. Oyarzún
- Promotion: Legacy Fighting Alliance
- Date: December 6, 2024
- Venue: Commerce Casino & Hotel
- City: Commerce, California, United States

LFA 198: Miranda vs. Oyarzún was a mixed martial arts event promoted by Legacy Fighting Alliance and that took place on December 6, 2024, at the Commerce Casino & Hotel in Commerce, California, United States. It aired on UFC Fight Pass.

=== Background ===
The event were expected to headline by a LFA Featherweight Championship title unification bout between current champion Elijah Johns and interim champion Lerryan Douglas and a LFA Lightweight Championship bout between current champion Richie Lewis and Richie Miranda. However, two title bout were removed from the event due to Johns illness and Lewis injury. As a results, Miranda complete the event against promotional newcomer Hugo Oyarzún in a new main event.

=== Results ===
Fight card (UFC Fight Pass)
| Weight class | | | | Method | Round | Time | Notes |
|---|---|---|---|---|---|---|---|
| Lightweight | Richie Miranda | def. | Hugo Oyarzún | Decision (unanimous) (29–28, 29–28, 30–27) | 3 | 5:00 |
| Women's Bantamweight | Beatriz Mesquita | def. | Fernanda Araujo | Submission (rear-naked choke) | 2 | 4:21 |
| Featherweight | Chris Mecate | def. | Shaheen Santana | KO (punches) | 2 | 2:18 |
| Women's Strawweight | Sidney Trillo | def. | Stephanie Nayen | Decision (unanimous) (30–27, 30–27, 30–27) | 3 | 5:00 |
| Lightweight | Ilay Barzilay | def. | Kohl Laren | Decision (unanimous) (29–28, 29–28, 29–28) | 3 | 5:00 |
| Welterweight | Ty Miller | vs. | Arthur Barros | No Contest (accidental eye poke) | 1 | 3:30 | (Note: Accidental eye poke rendered Barros unable to continue.) |
Preliminary card (LFA Fight Network)
| Middleweight | James Romero | def. | Jake Woodley | Submission (anaconda choke) | 1 | 0:57 |
| Women's Flyweight | Elizabeth Rodríguez | def. | Mariana Poltronieri Piccolo | Decision (split) (29–28, 28–29, 29–28) | 3 | 5:00 |
| Women's Strawweight | Aline David | def. | Charlotte Craig | Submission (rear-naked choke) | 1 | 3:16 |

== See also ==
- 2024 in UFC
- 2024 in Professional Fighters League
- 2024 in Bellator MMA
- 2024 in ONE Championship
- 2024 in Absolute Championship Akhmat
- 2024 in Konfrontacja Sztuk Walki
- 2024 in Rizin Fighting Federation
- 2024 in LUX Fight League
- 2024 in Oktagon MMA
- 2024 in Brave Combat Federation
- 2024 in UAE Warriors
- 2024 in Road FC
