= UFC Fight Night: Procházka vs. Stirling =

Mixed martial arts event in 2026

- The poster for UFC Fight Night: Procházka vs. Stirling
- Promotion: Ultimate Fighting Championship
- Date: November 21, 2026
- Venue: Ali Bin Hamad al-Attiyah Arena
- City: Al Rayyan, Qatar

Event chronology
UFC 334: Gane vs. Hokit	UFC Fight Night: Procházka vs. Stirling	UFC Fight Night: Adesanya vs. Magomedov

UFC Fight Night: Procházka vs. Stirling (also known as UFC Fight Night 294) was a mixed martial arts event produced by the Ultimate Fighting Championship that took place on November 21, 2026, at the Ali Bin Hamad al-Attiyah Arena in Al Rayyan, Qatar.

== Background ==
The event marked the promotion's second visit to Qatar and first since UFC Fight Night: Tsarukyan vs. Hooker in November 2025.

A light heavyweight bout between former UFC Light Heavyweight Champion (also the inaugural Rizin Light Heavyweight Champion) Jiří Procházka and Navajo Stirling headlined the event.

A lightweight bout between Magomed Zaynukov and Manoel Sousa was reportedly scheduled for the event. However, Zaynukov stated he had not signed a contract for the fight and would not compete again in 2026 due to an operation, so the bout was cancelled.

A welterweight bout between Jake Matthews and promotional newcomer Akbar Abdullaev was initially announced for this event. However, Abdullaev will not compete at the event due to the promotion making a mistake with the matchup. As a result, Matthews met Tahir Abdullayev instead. At the weigh-ins, Abdullayev weighed in at 172 pounds, one pound over the division's non-title fight limit. The bout proceeded at catchweight and he was fined 20 percent of his purse, which went to Matthews.

Former LFA Women's Bantamweight Champion Jacqueline Cavalcanti and Michelle Montague were expected to meet in a women's bantamweight bout. However, the pairing was postponed to UFC 335 three weeks later for undisclosed reasons.

== Results ==
Main card (Paramount+)
Weight class				Method	Round	Time	Notes
Light Heavyweight	Navajo Stirling	def.	Jiří Procházka	KO (punches)	2	4:58
Featherweight	Kevin Vallejos	def.	Aljamain Sterling	Decision (unanimous) (30–27, 30–27, 29–28)	3	5:00
Lightweight	Dan Hooker	def.	Brian Ortega	Decision (unanimous) (30–27, 30–27, 30–27)	3	5:00
Flyweight	Kyoji Horiguchi	def.	Asu Almabayev	Decision (unanimous) (30–27, 30–27, 29–28)	3	5:00
Middleweight	Ikram Aliskerov	def.	Jared Cannonier	Decision (unanimous) (30–27, 30–27, 30–27)	3	5:00
Preliminary card (Paramount+)
Bantamweight	Santiago Luna	def.	Aleksandre Topuria	Decision (split) (30–27, 28–29, 29–28)	3	5:00
Heavyweight	Tallison Teixeira	def.	Shamil Gaziev	Decision (unanimous) (30–27, 29–28, 29–28)	3	5:00
Flyweight	Amir Albazi	def.	Alessandro Costa	Submission (rear-naked choke)	3	4:34	(Note: Albazi was deducted one point in round 2 due to grabbing the fence.)
Catchweight (172 lb)	Tahir Abdullayev	def.	Jake Matthews	Decision (unanimous) (30–27, 30–27, 29–28)	3	5:00
Lightweight	Dom Mar Fan	def.	Nikolas Motta	Decision (unanimous) (30–26, 30–26, 29–27)	3	5:00
Light Heavyweight	Diyar Nurgozhay	def.	Alik Lorenz	TKO (head kick and punches)	2	0:24
Lightweight	John Mitchell	def.	Shoaib Yousaf	TKO (knee and punches)	1	3:50

== Bonus awards ==
The following fighters received $100,000 bonuses.

- Fight of the Night: No bonus awarded.
- Performance of the Night: Navajo Stirling, Amir Albazi, Diyar Nurgozhay, and John Mitchell

== See also ==
- 2026 in UFC
- List of current UFC fighters
- List of UFC events
