= Tallison Teixeira =

Brazilian mixed martial artist

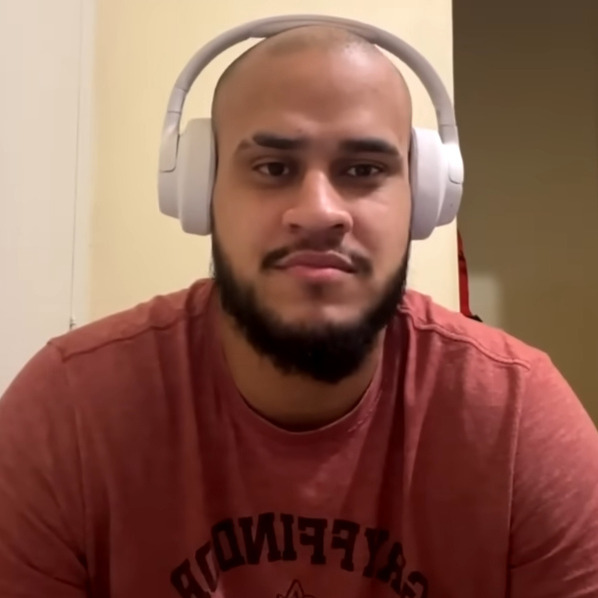
- Teixeira in 2025
- Born: Tallison Teixeira Silva; December 7, 1999 (age 26); Vitória da Conquista, Bahia, Brazil
- Nickname: Xicão
- Height: 6 ft 8 in (203 cm)
- Weight: 259 lb (117 kg; 18 st 7 lb)
- Division: Heavyweight
- Reach: 83 in (211 cm)
- Stance: Orthodox
- Fighting out of: São José do Rio Preto, São Paulo, Brazil
- Team: Team Lucas Mineiro
- Years active: 2021–present

Mixed martial arts record
- Total: 12
- Wins: 10
- By knockout: 7
- By submission: 1
- By decision: 2
- Losses: 2
- By knockout: 2

Other information
- Mixed martial arts record from Sherdog

Tallison Teixeira Silva (born December 7, 1999) is a Brazilian mixed martial artist who currently competes in the Heavyweight division of the Ultimate Fighting Championship (UFC). A professional since 2021, Teixeira earned his UFC contract on Dana White's Contender Series, winning by first round KO.

== Mixed martial arts career ==
=== Early career ===
Teixeira began his professional MMA career in 2021, quickly establishing himself as a heavyweight prospect. Teixeira amassed a record of 6-0 fighting exclusively in Brazil for promotions such as Legacy Fighting Alliance with all his wins coming via first round stoppage.

=== Dana White's Contender Series ===
Teixeira was then booked to compete on Week 6 of Season 8 of Dana White's Contender Series on September 17, 2024, against fellow Brazilian prospect Arthur Lopes.

He won the fight via first round knockout and was subsequently awarded a contract by Dana White.

=== Ultimate Fighting Championship ===
Teixeira was scheduled to face Łukasz Brzeski at UFC 310 on December 7, 2024. However, Teixeira withdrew from the fight due to injury and was replaced by Kennedy Nzechukwu.

After earning his contract, Teixeira made his UFC debut against Justin Tafa on February 8, 2025, at UFC 312. He won the bout via knockout 35 seconds into the first round thus earning him the Performance of the Night bonus.

Teixeira faced former UFC Heavyweight Championship challenger Derrick Lewis in the main event of UFC on ESPN 70 on July 12, 2025. He lost the fight by technical knockout 35 seconds into the first round.

Teixeira faced Tai Tuivasa on February 1, 2026, at UFC 325. He won the fight by unanimous decision.

Teixeira faced Sergei Pavlovich on May 30, 2026 at UFC Fight Night 277. He lost the fight by knockout under a minute into the first round.

Teixeira faced Shamil Gaziev on November 21, 2026 at UFC Fight Night 294. He won the fight by unanimous decision.

== Championships and accomplishments ==
- Ultimate Fighting Championship
  - Performance of the Night (One time) vs. Justin Tafa

== Mixed martial arts record ==
Professional record breakdown
| 12 matches | 10 wins | 2 losses |
| By knockout | 7 | 2 |
| By submission | 1 | 0 |
| By decision | 2 | 0 |

| Res. | Record | Opponent | Method | Event | Date | Round | Time | Location | Notes |
|---|---|---|---|---|---|---|---|---|---|
| Win | 10–2 | Shamil Gaziev | Decision (unanimous) | UFC Fight Night: Procházka vs. Stirling | November 21, 2026 | 3 | 5:00 | Al Rayyan, Qatar | |
| Loss | 9–2 | Sergei Pavlovich | KO (punches) | UFC Fight Night: Song vs. Figueiredo | May 30, 2026 | 1 | 0:39 | Macau SAR, China | |
| Win | 9–1 | Tai Tuivasa | Decision (unanimous) | UFC 325 | February 1, 2026 | 3 | 5:00 | Sydney, Australia | |
| Loss | 8–1 | Derrick Lewis | TKO (punches) | UFC on ESPN: Lewis vs. Teixeira | July 12, 2025 | 1 | 0:35 | Nashville, Tennessee, United States | |
| Win | 8–0 | Justin Tafa | TKO (knee to the body and elbow) | UFC 312 | February 8, 2025 | 1 | 0:35 | Sydney, Australia | Performance of the Night. |
| Win | 7–0 | Arthur Lopes | KO (punches) | Dana White's Contender Series 72 | September 17, 2024 | 1 | 1:57 | Las Vegas, Nevada, United States | |
| Win | 6–0 | Matheus Fonseca | KO (head kick and punches) | LFA 183 | May 3, 2024 | 1 | 1:55 | Rio de Janeiro, Brazil | |
| Win | 5–0 | Arthur Fonseca | TKO (punches) | LFA 175 | January 27, 2024 | 1 | 3:31 | Cajamar, Brazil | |
| Win | 4–0 | Julio dos Santos | TKO (punches) | Dominium FC 20 | October 7, 2023 | 1 | N/A | Campinas, Brazil | |
| Win | 3–0 | Fernando Kato | KO (punch) | Standout Fighting Tournament 37 | September 3, 2022 | 1 | 0:24 | São Paulo, Brazil | |
| Win | 2–0 | Caio Rabelo | KO (punch) | Pantanal FC 26 | November 27, 2021 | 1 | 0:30 | Costa Rica, Brazil | |
| Win | 1–0 | Carlos Victor Sena | Submission (inverted triangle armbar) | MF Fighters 6 | October 30, 2021 | 1 | 4:40 | São José do Rio Preto, Brazil | Heavyweight debut. |

== Kickboxing and Muay Thai record ==
Professional Muay Thai & Kickboxing record
| Date | Result | Opponent | Event | Location | Method | Round | Time |
|---|---|---|---|---|---|---|---|
| 2022-10-28 | Win | (Brazil) Jhonny Pereira | SFT Xtreme 11 | São Paulo, Brazil | Decision (unanimous) | 3 | 3:00 |
Legend: Win Loss Draw/No contest Notes

== See also ==
- List of current UFC fighters
- List of Dana White's Contender Series alumni
- List of male mixed martial artists
