= Dana White's Contender Series season 8 =

UFC mixed martial arts event in 2024

Dana White's Contender Series
- Season 8

Release
- Original network: ESPN+
- Original release: August 13 – October 15, 2024

Season chronology
- ← Previous; Season 7 Next → Season 9

Season 8 of Dana White's Contender Series commences in August 2024 and in the US is exclusive to ESPN+, ESPN's over-the-top subscription package.

== Week 1 – August 13 ==
=== Background ===
Dana White's Contender Series 67
- Promotion: DWCS
- Date: August 13, 2024
- Venue: UFC Apex Centre
- City: Las Vegas, Nevada, United States

Main Card
Weight class				Method	Round	Time	Notes
Middleweight	Mansur Abdul-Malik	def.	Wes Schultz	TKO (elbows and punches)	2	3:55
Welterweight	Rami Hamed	def.	Meng Ding	Decision (unanimous) (30–26, 29–27, 29–27)	3	5:00	(Note: Ding was deducted 1 point in round 3 due to multiple groin strikes.)
Light Heavyweight	Bruno Lopes	def.	Mikheil Sazhiniani	TKO (punches)	2	4:14
Featherweight	José Miguel Delgado	def.	Ernie Juarez	KO (knee and punches)	2	1:25
Flyweight	Lone'er Kavanagh	def.	An Tuan Ho	KO (punch)	1	2:35

=== Contract awards ===
The following fighters were awarded contracts with the UFC:

- Mansur Abdul-Malik, Bruno Lopes, Jose Delgado, and Lone'er Kavanagh

== Week 2 – August 20 ==
Dana White's Contender Series 68
- Promotion: DWCS
- Date: August 20, 2024
- Venue: UFC Apex Centre
- City: Las Vegas, Nevada, United States

Main Card
Weight class				Method	Round	Time	Notes
Welterweight	Andreas Gustafsson	def.	Pat Pytlik	TKO (knees)	2	3:20
Heavyweight	Rizvan Kuniev	def.	Hugo Cunha	TKO (knee to the body and punches)	1	4:59
Bantamweight	Cortavious Romious	def.	Michael Imperato	Decision (unanimous) (30–27, 30–27, 30–27)	3	5:00
Middleweight	Torrez Finney	def.	Cam Rowston	Decision (unanimous) (29–28, 29–28, 29–28)	3	5:00
Bantamweight	Cody Haddon	def.	Billy Brand	Submission (rear-naked choke)	1	3:09

=== Contract awards ===
The following fighters were awarded contracts with the UFC:

- Andreas Gustafsson Berg, Rizvan Kuniev, Cortavious Romious, and Cody Haddon

== Week 3 – August 27 ==
=== Background ===
Dana White's Contender Series 69
- Promotion: DWCS
- Date: August 27, 2024
- Venue: UFC Apex Centre
- City: Las Vegas, Nevada, United States

Main Card
Weight class				Method	Round	Time	Notes
Middleweight	Andrey Pulyaev	def.	Liam Anderson	Decision (unanimous) (30–27, 30–27, 30–27)	3	5:00
Featherweight	Bogdan Grad	def.	Michael Aswell	Decision (split) (29–28, 28–29, 30–27)	3	5:00
Middleweight	Marco Tulio	def.	Matthieu Letho Duclos	TKO (spinning back kick and punches)	2	2:38
Bantamweight	Malcolm Wellmaker	def.	Adam Bramhald	KO (punch)	1	2:29
Flyweight	Nick Piccininni	def.	Jack Duffy	Decision (split) (29–28, 28–29, 29–28)	3	5:00

=== Contract awards ===
The following fighters were awarded contracts with the UFC:

- Andrey Pulyaev, Bogdan Grad, Marco Tulio, and Malcolm Wellmaker

== Week 4 – September 3 ==
Dana White's Contender Series 70
- Promotion: DWCS
- Date: September 3, 2024
- Venue: UFC Apex Centre
- City: Las Vegas, Nevada, United States

=== Background ===
Tommy McMillen was scheduled to face Austin Bashi in a featherweight bout at the event, but he withdrew due to injury and the bout was cancelled. Bashi instead faced Dorian Ramos.

Main Card
Weight class				Method	Round	Time	Notes
Welterweight	Ko Seok-hyun	def.	Igor Cavalcanti	Decision (unanimous) (30–27, 29–28, 29–28)	3	5:00
Middleweight	Djorden Ribeiro dos Santos	def.	Will Currie	Decision (unanimous) (30–27, 30–27, 30–27)	3	5:00
Featherweight	Austin Bashi	def.	Dorian Ramos	Submission (rear-naked choke)	2	3:15
Women's Flyweight	Yuneisy Duben	def.	Shannon Clark	KO (punch)	1	1:13
Lightweight	Quillan Salkilld	def.	Gauge Young	Decision (unanimous) (30–27, 29–28, 29–28)	3	5:00

=== Contract awards ===
The following fighters were awarded contracts with the UFC:

- Ko Seok-hyun, Djorden Ribeiro dos Santos, Austin Bashi, Yuneisy Duben and Quillan Salkilld

== Week 5 – September 10 ==
=== Background ===
A lightweight bout between Quemuel Ottoni and Kody Steele was set for the card. Despite both men weighing in, Ottoni pulled out of the bout the day of the event. Kody Steele was paid his show and win money and was rebooked to fight Chasen Blair on Week 9 of DWCS.

Dana White's Contender Series 71
- Promotion: DWCS
- Date: September 10, 2024
- Venue: UFC Apex Centre
- City: Las Vegas, Nevada, United States

Main Card
Weight class				Method	Round	Time	Notes
Light Heavyweight	Navajo Stirling	def.	Phillip Latu	KO (punch)	2	2:21
Middleweight	Yousri Belgaroui	def.	Taiga Iwasaki	TKO (punches)	3	2:34	(Note: Belgaroui would have been deducted 1 point in round 2 due to multiple eye pokes.)
Bantamweight	Josias Musasa	def.	Otari Tanzilovi	Decision (split) (29–28, 28–29, 29–28)	3	5:00
Women’s Flyweight	Nicolle Caliari	def.	Corrine Laframboise	Submission (armbar)	1	4:45

=== Contract awards ===
The following fighters were awarded contracts with the UFC:

- Navajo Stirling, Josias Musasa, and Nicolle Caliari

== Week 6 – September 17 ==
Dana White's Contender Series 72
- Promotion: DWCS
- Date: September 17, 2024
- Venue: UFC Apex
- City: Las Vegas, Nevada, United States

Main Card
Weight class				Method	Round	Time	Notes
Bantamweight	Elijah Smith	def.	Aaron Tau	Decision (unanimous) (29–28, 29–28, 29–28)	3	5:00
Heavyweight	Tallison Teixeira	def.	Arthur Lopes	TKO (punches)	1	1:57
Welterweight	Benjamin Bennett	def.	Joey Hart	Decision (split) (29–28, 28–29, 29–28)	3	5:00
Middleweight	Ateba Gautier	def.	Yura Naito	TKO (punches)	2	4:00
Lightweight	Ahmad Sohail Hassanzada	def.	Dylan Mantello	Technical Submission (rear-naked choke)	3	2:41

=== Contract awards ===
The following fighters were awarded contracts with the UFC:

- Elijah Smith, Tallison Teixeira, Ateba Gautier and Ahmad Sohail Hassanzada

== Week 7 – September 24 ==
Dana White's Contender Series 73
- Promotion: DWCS
- Date: September 24, 2024
- Venue: UFC Apex Centre
- City: Las Vegas, Nevada, United States

Main Card
Weight class				Method	Round	Time	Notes
Heavyweight	Danylo Voievodkin	def.	Bailey Schoenfelder	Submission (rear-naked choke)	1	1:13
Welterweight	Daniel Frunza	def.	Vadym Kutsyi	TKO (punches)	2	3:30
Light Heavyweight	Kevin Christian	def.	Francesco Mazzeo	Submission (triangle armbar)	2	4:17
Featherweight	Kevin Vallejos	def.	Cam Teague	TKO (punches)	1	2:23
Women's Strawweight	Alexia Thainara	def.	Rose Conceição	Decision (unanimous) (30–27, 30–27, 30–27)	3	5:00

=== Contract awards ===
The following fighters were awarded contracts with the UFC:

- Alexia Thainara, Kevin Vallejos, Kevin Christian, Daniel Frunza and Danylo Voievodkin

== Week 8 – October 1 ==
=== Background ===
A featherweight bout between Alberto Mondes and Robbie Ring was set for the card. However, Ring withdrew due to injury and was replaced by Carlos Calderon.

Dana White's Contender Series 74
- Promotion: DWCS
- Date: October 1, 2024
- Venue: UFC Apex Centre
- City: Las Vegas, Nevada, United States

Main Card
Weight class				Method	Round	Time	Notes
Light Heavyweight	Diyar Nurgozhay	def.	Bartosz Szewczyk	KO (head kick and punches)	2	3:32
Featherweight	Alberto Montes	def.	Carlos Calderon	Submission (anaconda choke)	2	2:38
Bantamweight	David Martínez	def.	Xavier Franklin	Decision (unanimous) (30–27, 30–27, 30–27)	3	5:00
Middleweight	Torrez Finney	def.	Abdellah Er-Ramy	TKO (punches)	1	4:10
Welterweight	Jacobe Smith	def.	Christien Savoie	TKO (elbows)	2	2:55

=== Contract awards ===
The following fighters were awarded contracts with the UFC:

- Jacobe Smith, Torrez Finney, David Martínez, Alberto Montes, and Diyar Nurgozhay

== Week 9 – October 8 ==
Dana White's Contender Series 75
- Promotion: DWCS
- Date: October 8, 2024
- Venue: UFC Apex Centre
- City: Las Vegas, Nevada, United States

Main Card
Weight class				Method	Round	Time	Notes
Light Heavyweight	Artem Vakhitov	def.	Islem Masraf	TKO (punches)	1	4:23
Lightweight	Kody Steele	def.	Chasen Blair	TKO (punches)	2	4:07
Heavyweight	Mario Pinto	def.	Lucas Triverio Camacho	KO (punches)	1	1:43
Welterweight	Islam Dulatov	def.	Vanilto Antunes	KO (elbow)	1	2:44
Flyweight	Sean Gauci	def.	Anthony Drilich	Decision (unanimous) (29–28, 29–28, 29–28)	3	5:00

=== Contract awards ===
The following fighters were awarded contracts with the UFC:

- Artem Vakhitov, Kody Steele, Mario Pinto, and Islam Dulatov

== Week 10 – October 15 ==
Dana White's Contender Series 76
- Promotion: DWCS
- Date: October 15, 2024
- Venue: UFC Apex Centre
- City: Las Vegas, Nevada, United States

Main Card
Weight class				Method	Round	Time	Notes
Middleweight	Nick Klein	def.	Heraldo Souza	Submission (rear-naked choke)	1	0:37
Flyweight	Luis Gurule	def.	Nick Piccininni	Decision (split) (29–28, 28–29, 29–28)	3	5:00
Featherweight	Yadier del Valle	def.	Antônio Monteiro	Decision (unanimous) (30–27, 30–27, 30–26)	3	5:00
Women's Strawweight	Julieta Martinez	def.	Leslie Hernandez	Decision (split) (29–28, 28–29, 29–28)	3	5:00
Welterweight	Jonathan Micallef	def.	Mohamed Ado	Submission (triangle choke)	1	3:01

=== Contract awards ===
The following fighters were awarded contracts with the UFC:

- Jonathan Micallef, Yadier del Valle, Luis Gurule, and Nick Klein
