= Nick Piccininni =

American collegiate wrestler and mixed martial artist

- Born: Nicholas Piccininni; December 16, 1996 (age 29); East Setauket, New York, U.S.
- Nationality: American
- Weight: 125 lb (57 kg; 8.9 st)
- Division: Flyweight (2021–present)
- Style: Wrestling
- Fighting out of: Gilroy, California, U.S.
- Team: American Kickboxing Academy (2020–2023); Fortis MMA (2023–present)
- Wrestling: NCAA Division I Wrestling
- Years active: 2021–present

Mixed martial arts record
- Total: 11
- Wins: 9
- By submission: 5
- By decision: 4
- Losses: 2
- By decision: 2

Other information
- University: Oklahoma State University–Stillwater
- Notable school: Ward Melville High School
- Mixed martial arts record from Sherdog

Nicholas Piccininni (born December 16, 1996) is an American professional mixed martial artist and graduated folkstyle wrestler who currently competes in the flyweight division. As a wrestler, Piccininni became a three–time NCAA Division I All-American and a four–time Big 12 Conference champion out of the Oklahoma State University for John Smith.

== Wrestling career ==
=== High school ===
Piccininni was born and raised in East Setauket, New York, and went on to attend Ward Melville High School. He made the varsity team in wrestling when he was in the eighth grade, year in which he placed third at the state championships. He won the state title in every year of high school, making him a four–time NYSPHSAA champion at four different weight classes (106, 113, 120 & 126 respectively). He also competed at FloNationals, tournament in which he was the runner-up on 2013 and the champion on 2014. He graduated with a record of 226–3 and was awarded the 2015 Dave Schultz High School Excellence Award. After graduation, Piccininni committed to the Oklahoma State University to wrestle for the Cowboys.

=== College ===
After compiling a 16–4 record in open tournaments, claiming the OCU Open and the Bob Smith Open titles as a redshirting athlete, Piccininni went 27–8 during his freshman season (2016–2017) competing at 125 pounds, and went on to claim his first Big 12 Conference title before the NCAAs. At the National tournament, he went 5–2 with both losses coming from returning NCAA runner–up from Iowa Thomas Gilman, to place fourth and earn All–American honors. As a sophomore (2017–2018), Piccininni claimed his second Big 12 title in a row, pinning Zeke Moisey from West Virginia in the finals. After two wins, Piccininni was pinned by freshman phenom and three–time age–group World Champion from Iowa Spencer Lee (eventual winner of the championship) at the NCAAs, and went on to be eliminated by Ethan Lizak from Minnesota after losing by technical fall, compiling an overall record of 24–5 and not placing at the tournament despite his sixth seed.

Piccininni showed major improvements as a junior (2018–2019), building his record up to an undefeated 31–0 record before the NCAAs, notably avenging his loss to the now returning NCAA champion from Iowa Spencer Lee and claiming his third Big 12 Conference title. At the National tournament, Piccininni racked up three wins before once again losing to Lee and getting thrown to consolations, where after being downed by 2016 Cadet World Championship runner–up from Cornell Vito Arujau, he got a win over Pat Glory to place fifth and secure his second All–American mention.

In his senior year (2019–2020) he captured 26 wins and 2 losses, became the ninth Cowboy to win four conference titles when he defeated Alex Mackall from Iowa State in the finals of the Big 12 Conference championships. Piccininni was the third–seeded wrestler for the 2020 NCAA Championships, however, the event was cancelled due to the COVID-19 pandemic, rendering him and all the qualifiers unable to compete. Piccininni earned first–team NWCA All–American honors after the season.

Piccininni graduated from the Oklahoma State University with a 112–17 record, four Big 12 Conference titles and three All–American honors.

=== Freestyle ===
During his academic years, Piccinini did not compete very regularly in freestyle. In June 2018, he competed at the US U23 Nationals, where after a four–match win streak he was quickly downed by Vito Arujau, placing sixth. A year later, he competed at the 2019 US Open in April, going 3–2. He made another brief appearance at the 2019 Beat the Streets of May, where he was tech'd by Jack Mueller.

=== Coaching ===
In April 2020, it was announced that Piccininni had joined the coaching staff of the wrestling team at Gilroy High School in Gilroy, California, along with notable athletes from AKA such as Daniel Cormier and Deron Winn.

== Mixed martial arts career ==
=== Early career ===
In April 2020, Piccininni announced his transition to MMA and signed a contract with Zinkin Entertainment & Sports Management. He started training at American Kickboxing Academy, MMA powerhouse where former Cowboys such as Daniel Cormier and Kyle Crutchmer train. Piccininni made his professional debut on June 18, 2021, at XFN 371, winning by submission in the first round.

He made his sophomore appearance in the sport against Joseph McCormick at XFN 376 on December 10, 2021. He won the bout via first-round submission.

His third bout took place on June 24, 2022, at XFN 381 against Shawn Gustafson. He won the bout via unanimous decision.

He then faced Freddie Rodriguez at Fury FC 72 on December 18, 2022. He won the bout via first-round submission.

=== Dana White's Contender Series ===
Piccininni appeared on Dana White's Contender Series 69 and faced Jack Duffy, winning his fight via a controversial split decision. Despite the win, Dana White didn't offer Piccininni a UFC contract although he did offer him a chance to rematch Jack Duffy at a later stage in the season.

Piccininni was scheduled to face Jack Duffy at Dana White's Contender Series 76 on October 15, 2024, in a rematch of their first fight, however Jack Duffy had to withdraw however due to undisclosed reasons and was replaced by undefeated prospect Luis Gurule. Piccininni lost the fight via split decision.

== Championships and accomplishments ==
=== Folkstyle wrestling ===
- National Collegiate Athletic Association
  - NCAA Division I All–American out of the Oklahoma State University (2017, 2019)
- Big 12 Conference
  - Big 12 Conference 125 lbs Championship out of the Oklahoma State University (2017, 2018, 2019, 2020)
- New York State Public High School Athletic Association
  - NYSPHSAA State Champion out of Ward Melville High School (2012, 2013, 2014, 2015)
  - NYSPHSAA All-State out of Ward Melville High School (2011, 2012, 2013, 2014, 2015)

== Mixed martial arts record ==
Professional record breakdown
11 matches	9 wins	2 losses
By submission	5	0
By decision	4	2

Res.	Record	Opponent	Method	Event	Date	Round	Time	Location	Notes
Win	9–2	Cleveland McLean	Decision (unanimous)	Fury FC 123	August 11, 2026	3	5:00	Dallas, Texas, United States	Catchweight (130 lb) bout.
Loss	8–2	Ricky Rojas	Decision (unanimous)	Fury FC 118	April 12, 2026	3	5:00	Houston, Texas, United States	
Win	8–1	Steven Orozco	Decision (split)	Fury FC 108	August 22, 2025	5	5:00	Dallas, Texas, United States	
Loss	7–1	Luis Gurule	Decision (split)	Dana White's Contender Series 76	October 15, 2024	3	5:00	Las Vegas, Nevada, United States	
Win	7–0	Jack Duffy	Decision (split)	Dana White's Contender Series 69	August 27, 2024	3	5:00	Las Vegas, Nevada, United States	
Win	6–0	Jomar Pa-ac	Submission (rear-naked choke)	Fury FC 92	June 16, 2024	4	3:43	Houston, Texas, United States	
Win	5–0	Victor Gonzalez	Submission (arm-triangle choke)	Fury FC 83	September 17, 2023	2	3:17	Tulsa, Oklahoma, United States	
Win	4–0	Freddie Rodriguez	Submission (arm-triangle choke)	Fury FC 72	December 18, 2022	1	3:11	Houston, Texas, United States	Flyweight debut.
Win	3–0	Shawn Gustafson	Decision (unanimous)	Xtreme Fight Night 381	June 24, 2022	3	5:00	Tulsa, Oklahoma, United States	
Win	2–0	Joseph McCormick	Submission (arm-triangle choke)	Xtreme Fight Night 376	December 10, 2021	1	1:28	Tulsa, Oklahoma, United States	Bantamweight debut.
Win	1–0	Chancey Wilson	Submission (rear-naked choke)	Xtreme Fight Night 371	June 18, 2021	1	1:41	Tulsa, Oklahoma, United States	Catchweight (130 lb) bout.

== Freestyle record ==
Senior Freestyle Matches
Res.	Record	Opponent	Score	Date	Event	Location
Loss	7–4	(United States) Jack Mueller	TF 0–10	May 6, 2019	2019 Beat The Streets: Grapple at the Garden	(United States) New York City, New York
2019 US Open DNP at 57 kg
Loss	7–3	(United States) Frank Perrelli	TF 0–10	April 24–27, 2019	2019 US Open National Championships	(United States) Las Vegas, Nevada
Win	7–2	(United States) Bernardino Gomez	TF 10–0	April 24–27, 2019	2019 US Open National Championships	(United States) Las Vegas, Nevada
Win	6–2	(United States) Ian Timmins	8–1	April 24–27, 2019	2019 US Open National Championships	(United States) Las Vegas, Nevada
Loss	5–2	(United States) Darian Cruz	2–4	April 24–27, 2019	2019 US Open National Championships	(United States) Las Vegas, Nevada
Win	5–1	(United States) Christian Sharp	TF 10–0	April 24–27, 2019	2019 US Open National Championships	(United States) Las Vegas, Nevada
2018 US U23 Nationals 6th at 61 kg
Loss	4–1	(United States) Vito Arujau	TF 0–10	June 1–3, 2018	2018 US U23 National Championships	(United States) Akron, Ohio
Win	4–0	(United States) Jens Lantz	8–1	June 1–3, 2018	2018 US U23 National Championships	(United States) Akron, Ohio
Win	3–0	(United States) Micky Phillippi	2–2	June 1–3, 2018	2018 US U23 National Championships	(United States) Akron, Ohio
Win	2–0	(United States) Ryan Haskett	11–9	June 1–3, 2018	2018 US U23 National Championships	(United States) Akron, Ohio
Win	1–0	(United States) Hunter Kosco	TF 10–0	June 1–3, 2018	2018 US U23 National Championships	(United States) Akron, Ohio

== NCAA record ==
NCAA Championships Matches
Res.	Record	Opponent	Score	Date	Event
2019 NCAA Championships 5th at 125 lbs
Win	11–6	Pat Glory	Fall	March 20–22, 2019	2019 NCAA Division I Wrestling Championships
Loss	10–6	Vito Arujau	1–5	March 20–22, 2019	2019 NCAA Division I Wrestling Championships
Loss	10–5	Spencer Lee	4–11	March 20–22, 2019	2019 NCAA Division I Wrestling Championships
Win	10–4	Pat Glory	9–5	March 20–22, 2019	2019 NCAA Division I Wrestling Championships
Win	9–4	Elijah Oliver	MD 13–2	March 20–22, 2019	2019 NCAA Division I Wrestling Championships
Win	8–4	Korbin Meink	Fall	March 20–22, 2019	2019 NCAA Division I Wrestling Championships
2018 NCAA Championships DNP at 125 lbs
Loss	7–4	Ethan Lizak	TF 0–16	March 15–17, 2018	2018 NCAA Division I Wrestling Championships
Loss	7–3	Spencer Lee	Fall	March 15–17, 2018	2018 NCAA Division I Wrestling Championships
Win	7–2	Sean Russell	6-3	March 15–17, 2018	2018 NCAA Division I Wrestling Championships
Win	6–2	Travis Piotrowski	Fall	March 15–17, 2018	2018 NCAA Division I Wrestling Championships
2017 NCAA Championships 4th at 125 lbs
Loss	5–2	Thomas Gilman	6–13	March 15–17, 2017	2017 NCAA Division I Wrestling Championships
Win	5–1	Jack Mueller	INJ	March 15–17, 2017	2017 NCAA Division I Wrestling Championships
Win	4–1	Sean Russell	SV–1 6–4	March 15–17, 2017	2017 NCAA Division I Wrestling Championships
Win	3–1	Brock Hudkins	7–5	March 15–17, 2017	2017 NCAA Division I Wrestling Championships
Loss	2–1	Thomas Gilman	Fall	March 15–17, 2017	2017 NCAA Division I Wrestling Championships
Win	2–0	Josh Rodriguez	5–2	March 15–17, 2017	2017 NCAA Division I Wrestling Championships
Win	1–0	Elijah Oliver	Fall	March 15–17, 2017	2017 NCAA Division I Wrestling Championships

=== Stats ===
Season	Year	School	Rank	Weigh Class	Record	Win	Bonus
2020	Senior	Oklahoma State University	#3 (DNQ)	125	26–2	92.86%	71.43%
2019	Junior	Oklahoma State University	#3 (5th)	125	35–2	94.59%	75.68%
2018	Sophomore	Oklahoma State University	#7 (DNP)	125	24–5	82.76%	48.28%
2017	Freshman	Oklahoma State University	#8 (4th)	125	27–8	77.14%	34.29%
Career					112–17	86.84%	57.42%
