= List of IMMAF championships =

This is a list of International Mixed Martial Arts Federation (IMMAF) championships across continental associations and various formats.

== World Championships ==
=== 2014 IMMAF World Championships of Amateur MMA ===
The first IMMAF World Championships of Amateur MMA were held between 29 June and 5 July 2014 in Las Vegas, Nevada (U.S.). The tournament took place over four days at Cox Pavilion at the University of Nevada, Las Vegas, with the finals taking place inside the UFC Fan Expo at Mandalay Bay on 5 July.

==== Medalists ====
Men

Event	Gold	Silver	Bronze	
Super Heavyweight	Wessel Mostert; South Africa	Nicolo Bonati; Romania	Leroy Johnson; Canada	N/A
Heavyweight	Hans Lackner; Austria	Marcin Kalata; Poland	Riini Apo; New Zealand	Alexander Pärleros; Sweden
Light Heavyweight	Alessio Di Chirico; Italy	Eivind D. S. Kjonsvik; Norway	Aaron Wallace; Ireland	Karol Linowski; Poland
Middleweight	Mikkel Kasper; Denmark	Gard Olve Sagen; Norway	Raymond Gray; United States	Daniel Cassell; Great Britain
Welterweight	Aleksi Nurminen; Finland	Charles Ntiamoah Amoako; United Kingdom	Joachim Tollefsen; Norway	Zach Fears; United States
Lightweight	Jose Mariscal; United States	Jimmie Jensen; Sweden	Charlie Day; Great Britain	Guillaume Bletio; France
Featherweight	Jari Illikainen; Finland	Joel Moya; Sweden	Jordan Chester; Great Britain	Salvatore Liga; Belgium
Bantamweight	Jose Torres; United States	Bohdan Holovatyi; Ukraine	Carl Burton; Great Britain	Liridon Ramani; Belgium
Flyweight	Carlos Hernandez; United States	Kristian Lindstrøm Skogmo; Norway	Saku Ronkainen; Finland	Petko; Italy

Women

Event	Gold	Silver	Bronze	
Featherweight	Amanda Lino; South Africa	Jill Holmström; Sweden	Andrea Whitney; United States	Florence Bethert; France
Bantamweight	Sarah Jamila; Denmark	Aleksandra Milczarek; Poland	Lucrezia Ria; Italy	Nicole Brown; United States
Flyweight	Amanda Ribas; Brazil	Gabriella Ringblom; Sweden	Micol Di Segni; Italy	N/A
Strawweight	Daniela Kortmann; Germany	Rachelle Abou Abdallah; Lebanon	N/A	N/A

=== 2015 IMMAF World Championships of Amateur MMA ===
The 2015 IMMAF World Championships of Amateur MMA took place at Las Vegas, Nevada (USA), as the International Mixed Martial Arts Federation (IMMAF) returned for the tournament's second year.

The 2015 Championships took place during the fourth annual UFC International Fight Week, from Monday, July 6 to Saturday, July 11, 2015. The fan experience was billed as the world's largest mixed martial arts celebration, guaranteeing high-energy, all-star entertainment and concluding with a weekend of action-packed fights including UFC 189 on July 11.

==== Medalists ====
Men

Event	Gold	Silver	Bronze	
Super Heavyweight	Kevin Szaflarski; Poland	Mokhammad Malagov; Kazakhstan	Vlad Mavrodin; Romania	N/A
Heavyweight	Zdenek Ledvina; Czech Republic	Travis Edwards; United States	Marcin Kalata; Poland	Allan Guichard; France
Light Heavyweight	Saeid Mirazaei; Canada	Tencho Karaenev; Bulgaria	Paolo Anastasi; Italy	Denis Perry; Great Britain
Middleweight	Brendan Allen; United States	James Duckett; Great Britain	Imad Alhowayeck; Lebanon	Juho Laitinen; Finland
Welterweight	William Starks; United States	Alexander Martinez; Canada	Patryk Ruta; Poland	Jake Constantinou; Great Britain
Lightweight	Josh Ellis; Great Britain	Tuukka Repo; Finland	Davide Gregorio La Torre; Italy	Joeshwa Mortada; Lebanon
Featherweight	Frans Mlambo; Ireland	Joel Moya; Sweden	Yurii Bosyi; Ukraine	Nicolas Ott; France
Bantamweight	Jose Torres; United States	Nurtilek Konashov; Kazakhstan	Carl McNally; Great Britain	Marco Zannetti; Italy
Flyweight	Iurie Bejenari; France	Sedar Altas; Sweden	Braydan Graham; New Zealand	Sambath Khun; Canada

Women

Event	Gold	Silver	Bronze	
Featherweight	Jamie Herrington; Canada	Sinead Kavanagh; Ireland	Julia Dorny; Germany	Lindsay Lawrence; United States
Bantamweight	Lucrezia Ria; Italy	Lucie Bertaud; France	Kimberley Defiori; United States	Lisa Engelke; Sweden
Flyweight	Micol Di Segni; Italy	Anja Saxmark; Sweden	Natalie Jean Ausmeier; South Africa	Michaela Dostalova; Czech Republic
Strawweight	Minna Grusander; Finland	Maria Vittoria Colonna; Italy	Sarah Archer; New Zealand	Codie Wareham; United States

=== 2016 IMMAF World Championships of Amateur MMA ===
The IMMAF World Championships of Amateur MMA returns to Las Vegas as part of the 5th Annual UFC International Fight Week™, the world's largest celebration of combat sports, taking place from Tuesday, July 5 – Sunday, July 10.

The 2016 IMMAF World Championships will be hosted at the Las Vegas Convention Center during the week, with the championships featured on July 10 at the UFC Fan Expo®.

Hosted by the global governing body for amateur MMA, the IMMAF's third iteration of its five-day tournament, will air its post-event highlights on UFC FIGHT PASS®, along with other international television platforms.

==== Medalists ====
Men

Event	Gold	Silver	Bronze	
Super Heavyweight	Charbel Diab; Lebanon	Marcin Kalata; Poland	Damian Visenjak; Austria	Dwain Meredith; South Africa
Heavyweight	Iman Smajic; Sweden	Allan Guichard; France	Daniel Galabarov; Bulgaria	Scott Trelford; Northern Ireland
Light Heavyweight	Matthew Sheehan; Ireland	Tencho Karaenev; Bulgaria	Jaakko Honkasalo; Finland	Adam Bieganski; Poland
Middleweight	Byron Chivers; New Zealand	Dallas Jennings; United States	Rostem Akman; Sweden	Andrew Stanway; Australia
Welterweight	Will Starks; United States	Alexander Martinez; Canada	Cian Cowley; Ireland	Hardeep Rai; Great Britain
Lightweight	Pieter Roedulf Roets; South Africa	Ferdun Osmanov; Bulgaria	Iorga Cristian; Romania	Przemyslaw Tokarz; Poland
Featherweight	Shoaib Yousaf; Great Britain	Nathan Kelly; Ireland	Eoghan Drumgoole; Ireland	Connor Hitchens; Great Britain
Bantamweight	Abdul Hussein; Finland	David Evans; United States	Hughie Orourke; Ireland	Marco Zannetti; Italy
Flyweight	Brayden Graham; New Zealand	David Forgarty; Ireland	Fahad Abdulrazaq; Bahrain	Josh Neale; Great Britain

Women

Event	Gold	Silver	Bronze	
Featherweight	Leah McCourt; Northern Ireland	Julia Dorny; Germany	Fatime Nanasi; Hungary	Taryn Conklin; United States
Bantamweight	Cornelia Holm; Sweden	Camilla Mannes; Norway	Arziko Bregu; Italy	Katarzyna Biegajlo; Poland
Flyweight	Gabriella Ringblom; Sweden	Anette Osterberg; Finland	Jess Bradley; New Zealand	Kelsey Gollihar; United States
Strawweight	Aleksandra Toncheva; Bulgaria	Aleksandra Rola; Poland	Raluca Dinescu; Romania	Sarah Archer; New Zealand

=== 2017 IMMAF World Championships of Amateur MMA ===
The 2017 IMMAF World Championships of Amateur MMA took place in Manama, Bahrain at Khalifa Sports City Arena from 12 to 19 November.

==== Medalists ====
Men

Event	Gold	Silver	Bronze	
Super Heavyweight	Atanas Krastanov; Bulgaria	Marcin Kalata; Poland	Tolga Polat; Turkey	Damian Visenja; Austria
Heavyweight	Irman Smajic; Sweden	Lev Vins; Kazakhstan	Cameron Dempsey; Australia	Ryan Spillane; Ireland
Light Heavyweight	Murtaza Talha Ali; Bahrain	Pavel Pahomenko; Belarus	Anton Turkalj; Sweden	Pawel Zaikrzewski; Poland
Middleweight	Khaled Laallam; Sweden	Mohammad Munir; United States	Joseph Luciano; Australia	Christian Leroy Duncan; Great Britain
Welterweight	Benjamin Bennet; United States	Sola Axel; France	Cody Barnwell; Australia	Isakov Issa; Belgium
Lightweight	Quitin Thomas; United States	Vitali Andruhovich; Belarus	Jose Teixeira; Luxembourg	Ermal Hadribeaj; Albania
Featherweight	Delyan Georgiev; Bulgaria	Joel Arolainen; Finland	Abdulmanap Magomedov; Bahrain	David Evans; United States
Bantamweight	Gamzat Magomedov; Bahrain	Olzhas Moldagaliyev; Kazakhstan	Florian Doskja; Albania	Dinislam Jetpissov; Kazakhstan
Flyweight	Serdar Altas; Sweden	Yernaz Mussabek; Kazakhstan	Hussain Abdulla; Bahrain	Sean Stebbins; United States

Women

Event	Gold	Silver	Bronze	
Lightweight	Gase Sanita; New Zealand	Kaycee Blake; Great Britain	Fatena Bureshaid; Bahrain	Julia Dorny; Germany
Featherweight	Fabiana Giampa; Italy	Courtney McCrudden; Great Britain	Nicole Schnalzer; Austria	Nora Nagy; Hungary
Bantamweight	Manon Fiorot; France	Chamia Chabbi; Finland	Karoline Hulkko; Finland	Joanne Doyle; Great Britain
Flyweight	Michele Oliveira; Brazil	Danni Neilan; Ireland	Alexandra Kovacs; Hungary	Anette Osterberg; Finland
Strawweight	Anna Astvik; Sweden	Hannah Dawson; New Zealand	Ayan Tursyn; Kazakhstan	Sara Cova; Mexico

=== 2018 IMMAF World Championships of Amateur MMA ===
The 2018 IMMAF – WMMAA Unified World Championships took place at Khalifa Sport City arena in Manama, Bahrain from 11 to 18 November 2018, hosted by the Bahrain Mixed Martial Arts Federation and with support from the Bahrain Olympic Committee, as part of BRAVE Combat Week.

==== Medalists ====
Men

Event	Gold	Silver	Bronze	
Super Heavyweight	Pasha Kharkhachaev; Bahrain	Grigoriy Ponomarev; Russia	Kaloyan Kolev; Bulgaria	Delano Human; South Africa
Heavyweight	Ryan Spillane; Ireland	Chaddad Alexandre; Lebanon	Bartosz Zaczeniuk; Poland	Bagrat Adamiya; Ukraine
Light Heavyweight	Magomed Shakhrudinov; Russia	Ruslan Shidakov; Russia	Mustafa Atrakchi; Sweden	Olzhobai Kudaiberdi Uulu; Kyrgyzstan
Middleweight	Dzhamal Medzhidov; Russia	Andreas Berg; Sweden	Joseph Luciano; Australia	Dario Bellandi; Italy
Welterweight	Islam Bagomedov; Russia	Sola Axel; France	Murad Guseinov; Bahrain	Rusi Minev; Bulgaria
Lightweight	Lee Hammond; Ireland	Marko Sarasjärvi; Finland	Adilbek Kairgali; Kazakhstan	Shamil Gimbatov; Bahrain
Featherweight	Delyan Georgiev; Bulgaria	Eduard Kexel; Germany	Enrique Hecher Sosa; Spain	Abdulmanap Magomedov; Bahrain
Bantamweight	Sharapudin Magomedov; Russia	Magomed Idrisov; Bahrain	Carlos Veras; Brazil	Vladyslav Dubkov; Ukraine
Flyweight	Ruslan Satiev; Russia	Mohammed Almuamari; Bahrain	Alibi Temirtassov; Kazakhstan	Julio Plaatjies; South Africa

Women

Event	Gold	Silver	Bronze	
Lightweight	Gase Sanita; New Zealand	Polina Kobzeva; Russia	Yudan Bao; China	Divya Nagaraj; India
Featherweight	Julia Dorny; Germany	Jenni Kivioja; Finland	Meng Chen; China	Kateryna Dobroznai; Ukraine
Bantamweight	LaNeisha Vinson; United States	Bulgaru Daniela Mihaela; Romania	Lucie Vacova; Czech Republic	Dee Begley; Ireland
Flyweight	Alexandra Kovacs; Hungary	Janika Antinmaa Antinmaa; Finland	Ilaria Norcia; Italy	Cassandra Le Roux; South Africa
Strawweight	Daria Samchik; Ukraine	Nina Back; Sweden	Nurzhamal Sadykova; Kazakhstan	Nadia Vera; Mexico
Atomweight	Raluca Dinescu; Romania	Oksana Pashkova; Ukraine	Jenna Horto; Finland	Svetlana Kotova; Russia

=== 2019 IMMAF World Championships of Amateur MMA ===
The IMMAF | WMMAA World Amateur MMA Championships return to Manama this November from 11 to 16, 2019, as part of BRAVE International Combat Week, for the third year running.

The International Mixed Martial Arts Federation’s 2019 Senior and Junior World Championship tournaments will take place at Khalifa Sport City over five days, hosted by the Bahrain Mixed Martial Arts Federation under the Bahrain Olympic Committee. Commencing on Sunday 10 November with the Tournament Draw and Opening Ceremony, the competitions will play out from Monday 11 to Thursday 14 with the Finals on Saturday 16. Bahraini promotion BRAVE will host a professional MMA night on Friday 15 at the same arena.

==== Medalists ====
Men

Event	Gold	Silver	Bronze	
Super Heavyweight	Pasha Kharkhachaev; Bahrain	Rassul Khatayev; Kazakhstan	Shamsutdin Makhmudov; Russia	Moustafa Abdelsalam; Egypt
Heavyweight	Gadzhimurad Bagaudinov; Russia	Shamil Kuramagomedov; Russia	Shamil Gaziev; Bahrain	Jindrich Krajca; Czech Republic
Light Heavyweight	Murtaza Talha Ali; Bahrain	Magomed Gadzhiiasulov; Bahrain	Dima Ruzhytskyi; Ukraine	Magomed Shakhrudinov; Russia
Middleweight	Gazimurad Magomedov; Russia	Iusup Magomedov; Russia	Rengou Mefire Simplice; Cameroon	Sultan Omarov; Bahrain
Welterweight	Ramazan Gitinov; Bahrain	Zagid Gaidarov; Bahrain	Islam Bagomedov; Russia	Rustam Khadisgadzhiev; Russia
Lightweight	Murad Umachiev; Russia	Omaraskhab Yusupov; Russia	Iordan Marinov; Bulgaria	Magomed Magomedov; Bahrain
Featherweight	Ahmed Gazimagomedov; Russia	Elaman Shalkimbekov; Kazakhstan	Daniyal Shamkhalov; Sweden	Alexander O'Sullivan; Ireland
Bantamweight	Gadzhimurad Zavaev; Russia	Djamaludin Aliev; Russia	Dastan Amangeldy; Kazakhstan	Olzhas Moldagaliyev; Kazakhstan
Flyweight	Ata Atdayev; Ukraine	Israel Galvan; United States	Yernaz Mussabek; Kazakhstan	Ruslan Satiev; Russia
Strawweight	Bagdat Zhubanysh; Kazakhstan	Sagyn Kazbek; Kazakhstan	Adam Khamkhoev; Russia	Farkhod Rakhmonaliev; Russia

Women

Event	Gold	Silver	Bronze	
Lightweight	Michelle Montague; New Zealand	Mel Webster; New Zealand	Sandra Meneses; Sweden	Saida Khassenova; Kazakhstan
Featherweight	Sabrina Laurentina De Sousa; Bahrain	Jasmine Favero; Italy	Jenni Kivioja; Finland	Tatiana Postarnakova; Russia
Bantamweight	Guangmei Han; China	Shauna Bannon; Ireland	Frida Vastamäki; Sweden	Brena Soares Cardozo; Bahrain
Flyweight	Bianca Antman; Sweden	Hannah Dawson; New Zealand	Viktoriya Dudakova; Russia	Zemfira Alieva; Russia
Strawweight	Anastasiya Svetkivska; Ukraine	Olivia Ukmar; Australia	Colleen Augustin; Malaysia	Daria Samchik; Ukraine
Atomweight	Bezhan Mahmudi; Sweden	Ayan Tursyn; Kazakhstan	Daniela Hernandez; Mexico	Nicole Geraldo; Mexico

=== 2021 IMMAF World Championships of Amateur MMA ===
The 2021 IMMAF World Championships of Amateur MMA took place at Abu Dhabi, United Arab Emirates from 24 to 29 January 2022.

==== Medalists ====
Men

Event	Gold	Silver	Bronze	
Super Heavyweight	Shamsutdin Makhmudov; Russia	Rassul Khatayev; Kazakhstan	Pasha Kharkhachaev; Bahrain	Ikhtiyor Khalmuradov; Uzbekistan
Heavyweight	Rasul Magomedov; Bahrain	Shamil Kuramagomedov; Russia	Khalil Ibnukhazharov; Russia	Tom Hoelemann; Germany
Light Heavyweight	Dzhamal Medzhidov; Russia	Robin Enontekio; Sweden	Magomed Shakhrudinov; Russia	Dmytro Babynskyi; Ukraine
Middleweight	Fergus Jenkins; New Zealand	Iusup Magomedov; Russia	Paul Buckley; Ireland	Sultan Omarov; Bahrain
Welterweight	Ramazan Gitinov; Bahrain	Jovidon Mahmudov; Tajikistan	Bogdan Pshebelskiy; Kazakhstan	Abdyla Aliev; Russia
Lightweight	Kurban Idrisov; Bahrain	Salamat Isbulaev; Russia	Marko Sarasjarvi; Finland	Neimat Assadov; Kazakhstan
Featherweight	Bekzat Zhassiya; Kazakhstan	Juan Izquierdo; Spain	Bakhtiyor Husainov; Tajikistan	Kurban Zainukov; Russia
Bantamweight	Shakhban Gapizov; Russia	Oskar Jaskari; Sweden	Yevgeni Shinkarevsky; Israel	Ismail Khan; Pakistan
Flyweight	Bektur Zhenishbek Uulu; Russia	Dastan Zhakypbekov; Kazakhstan	Rafael Calderon Coria; Spain	Ibragim Kartoev; Russia
Strawweight	Bagdat Zhubanysh; Kazakhstan	Farkhod Rakhmonaliev; Russia	Kurban Omarov; Russia	Yerulan Kabdulov; Kazakhstan

Women

Event	Gold	Silver	Bronze	
Lightweight	Olga Lagodnaya; Russia	Aizhan Abdykadyr; Kazakhstan	Mel Webster; New Zealand	Yrsa Sandin; Sweden
Featherweight	Sabrina Laurentina De Sousa; Bahrain	Cecilie Bolander; Norway	Michelle Montague; New Zealand	Zhansaya Yermagambetova; Kazakhstan
Bantamweight	Nina Nikolija Milosevic; Sweden	Raiane Vinuto Guimaraes; Bahrain	Tatiana Postarnakova; Russia	Josiane Oliveira; Brazil
Flyweight	Beatriz Consuli Diniz; Bahrain	Giulliany Perea; Brazil	Paulina Wisniewska; Poland	Alexandra Mitina; Russia
Strawweight	Aieza Ramos Bertolso; Bahrain	Josefine Modig; Sweden	Fabiola Silva; Bahrain	Altynay Mergenbay; Kazakhstan
Atomweight	Nadine Abbott Bissett; Ireland	Jenna Horto; Finland	Yana Markova; Russia	Vridhi Kumari; India

== World Cup ==
=== 2021 IMMAF World Cup ===
The 2021 IMMAF World Cup took place at Prague, Czech Republic from 8 to 11 September 2021.

==== Medalists ====
Men

Event	Gold	Silver	Bronze	
Heavyweight	Rasul Magomedov; Bahrain	Per Kjetil Haglund Tonnessen; Norway	Miha Frlić; Slovenia	Jonnie Andersson; Sweden
Light Heavyweight	Magomedzagid Magomedov; Bahrain	Mykola Kovalenko; Ukraine	Dmytro Babynskyi; Ukraine	Patrick Drescher; Germany
Middleweight	Hazem Kayyali; Jordan	Eoin Sheridan; Ireland	Raigo Kutsar; Estonia	Ergo Reinvald; Estonia
Welterweight	Jovidon Mahmudov; Tajikistan	Kevin Enz; Germany	John Oldenqvist; Sweden	Roman Pylypchuk; Ukraine
Lightweight	Ivan Kurelaru; Ukraine	Antoni Josep Marti Segarra; Spain	Ikromjon Ahmedov; Tajikistan	Solomon Simon; Ireland
Featherweight	Juan Izquierdo; Spain	Raphael Federico; Italy	Daniyal Shamkhalov; Sweden	Bakhtiyor Husainov; Tajikistan
Bantamweight	Fidel Gramiccia; Italy	Taylor Quinn; Ireland	Abdulla Mubarak; Bahrain	Oskar Jaskari; Sweden
Flyweight	Mansur Magomedov; Bahrain	Rafael Calderon Coria; Spain	Ruslan Telibaiev; Ukraine	Abubakr Baimuradov; Tajikistan
Strawweight	Eduard Kostrytsia; Ukraine	Samir Bairamov; Ukraine	N/A	N/A

Women

Event	Gold	Silver	Bronze	
Lightweight	Yrsa Sandin; Sweden	Eva Melo; Czech Republic	N/A	N/A
Featherweight	Cecilie Bolander; Norway	Katerina Lisova; Czech Republic	Marianna Skuba; Ukraine	Christina Papasotiriou; Greece
Bantamweight	Shauna Bannon; Ireland	Kerry Ann Vernon; Ireland	Maria Kaald Andresen; Norway	Jessica Andersson; Sweden
Flyweight	Millie Eriksson; Sweden	Renana Bruckstein; Germany	Tetiana Mokhova; Ukraine	Phyllis-Yasemin Leineweber; Germany
Strawweight	Josefine Modig; Sweden	Nina Back; Sweden	Anna Gaul; Germany	Caitlyn Hadfield; Ireland

== Super Cup ==
=== 2022 MMA Super Cup ===
The 2022 BRAVE MMA World Cup took place at Khalifa Sports City Arena, Bahrain from 8 to 12 March 2022. It was organised by the IMMAF, KHK Sports, Bahrain MMA Federation, and BRAVE Combat Federation

==== Medalists ====
Event	Gold	Silver	Bronze
Team	Bahrain; Men; Abdulla Mubarak; Haji Mohamed Ali; Kurban Idrisov; Gimbat Magomedov; Ramazan Gitinov; Magomed Isaev; Sultan Omarov; Gadzhi Gadzhiev; Sultan Gapizov; Women; Aieza Ramos Bertolso; Bianca Basílio; Sabrina Laurentina de Souza	Ireland; Men; Jamie Abbott Bissett; Jordan Bradshaw; Lewis Byrne; Jordan Furey; Conor McCarthy; Cameron Clements; Dennis Perry; Gustavo Lopez; Women; Eabha Cruise; Kerry Ann Vernon; Sineadh Ni Nuallain	Kazakhstan; Men; Zhanibek Tynyshtyk; Anatoliy Zolotykh; Neimat Assadov; Yerkin Begenov; Zhaxybek Aimakhanov; Daniil Gubin; Vakhid Timerbiyev; Alik Domnich; Rassul Khatayev; Women; Ayan Tursyn; Karina Sissenova; Antonina Kotlyarevskaya

== European Championships ==
=== 2015 IMMAF European Open Championships of Amateur MMA ===
The 2015 IMMAF European Open Championships of Amateur MMA took place at Birmingham, England, United Kingdom from the 19 to 22 November 2015.

The foundational European event took place in Birmingham at the Walsall Sports Centre at the University of Wolverhampton and was broadcast post-event on UFC Fight Pass and international television.

==== Medalists ====
Men

Event	Gold	Silver	Bronze	
Heavyweight	Daniel Galabarov; Bulgaria	Iman Smajic; Sweden	Petur Oskarsson; Iceland	Ryan Spillane; Ireland
Light Heavyweight	Ben Forsyth; Ireland	Balaze Kiss; Hungary	Tencho Karaenev; Bulgaria	Paolo Anastasi; Italy
Middleweight	Rostem Akman; Sweden	Marius Hakonsen; Norway	James Duckett; Great Britain	Asterio Lucchesini; Italy
Welterweight	Bjarki Palsson; Iceland	Dorian Dermendzhiev; Bulgaria	Jorgen Indsetviken; Norway	Hardeep Rai; Great Britain
Lightweight	Jack Shore; Great Britain	Geir Kare Cemsoylu; Norway	Thomas Martin; Ireland	Lee Hammond; Ireland
Featherweight	Joel Moya Schondorff; Sweden	Ross McCorriston; Great Britain	Ante Ageneby; Sweden	Connor Hitchens; Great Britain
Bantamweight	Abdul Hussein; Finland	Marco Zannetti; Italy	Alexis Guilleux; France	Renato Vidovic; Sweden
Flyweight	Jake Bond; Great Britain	Warren Mason; Great Britain	Hussain Haki Mahdi; Bahrain	David Forgarty; Ireland

Women

Event	Gold	Silver	Bronze	
Lightweight	Leah McCourt; Great Britain	Mia Isola; Finland	Sini Koivunen; Finland	N/A
Featherweight	Sanna Merta; Finland	Cornelia Holm; Sweden	Julia Dorny; Germany	Celine Provost; France
Bantamweight	Varpu Rinne; Finland	Gabriella Ringblom; Sweden	Camilla Mannes; Norway	Eloise Picard; Canada
Flyweight	Sunna Rannveig; Iceland	Anja Saxmark; Sweden	Inka Auvinen; Finland	Michaela Dostalova; Czech Republic
Strawweight	Aleksandra Toncheva; Bulgaria	Raluca Dinescu; Romania	Amy Omara; Great Britain	Lyudmila Sadirina; Azerbaijan

=== 2016 IMMAF European Open Championships of Amateur MMA ===
The 2016 IMMAF European Open Championships of Amateur MMA took place in Prague from 22 to 26 November.

Hosted by the Czech Mixed Martial Arts Association (MMAA), the International Mixed Martial Arts Federation's nation vs. nation tournament plays out in 2 rings across 5 days and features more than 170 Athletes from 30 countries worldwide.

The 2016 IMMAF European Open Championships of Amateur MMA will feature on UFC FIGHT PASS and international broadcast channels, post-event.

==== Medalists ====
Men

Event	Gold	Silver	Bronze	
Super Heavyweight	Atanas Krastanov; Bulgaria	Matias Anttila; Finland	Marcin Kalata; Poland	Damian Visenja; Austria
Heavyweight	Daniel Galabarov; Bulgaria	Irman Smajic; Sweden	Ion Grigore; Romania	Berat Berisha; Norway
Light Heavyweight	Egill Hjördísarson; Iceland	Pawel Zakrzewski; Poland	Tencho Karaenev; Bulgaria	Paolo Anastasi; Italy
Middleweight	Rostem Akman; Sweden	Valeri Atanasov; Bulgaria	Tom Crosby; Great Britain	Florian Aberger; Austria
Welterweight	Nikolay Nikolov; Bulgaria	Gianluigi Ventoruzzo; Italy	Henri Dimitri; France	Magnús Ingvarsson; Iceland
Lightweight	Ferdun Osmanov; Bulgaria	Lee Hammond; Ireland	Alexander O'Sullivan; Ireland	Milad Ahady; Great Britain
Featherweight	Daniel Schalander; Sweden	Michele Martignoni; Italy	Hoger Salih; Sweden	Kierandip Sahota; Great Britain
Bantamweight	Renato Vidovic; Sweden	Marco Zannetti; Italy	Rostislav Raichev; Bulgaria	Jan Vaclavek; Czech Republic
Flyweight	Serdar Altas; Sweden	David Fogarty; Ireland	Berik Shinaliyev; Kazakhstan	Sanan Safarli; Azerbaijan

Women

Event	Gold	Silver	Bronze	
Lightweight	Helin Paara; Estonia	Kerttu Kouki; Finland	N/A	N/A
Featherweight	Joanne Doyle; Great Britain	Julia Dorny; Germany	Iris Nihti; Finland	Fatime Nánási; Hungary
Bantamweight	Cornelia Holm; Sweden	Camilla Mannes; Norway	Arziko Bregu; Italy	Chamia Chabbi; Finland
Flyweight	Alexandra Kovacs; Hungary	Gabriella Ringblom; Sweden	Ilaria Norcia; Italy	Anette Osterberg; Finland
Strawweight	Aleksandra Toncheva; Bulgaria	Raluca Dinescu; Romania	Svetlana Kotova; Russia	N/A

=== 2017 IMMAF European Open Championships of Amateur MMA ===
The 2017 IMMAF European Open Championships of Amateur MMA took place at Sofia, Bulgaria from 29 March to 2 April.

==== Medalists ====
Men

Event	Gold	Silver	Bronze	
Super Heavyweight	Irman Smajic; Sweden	Atanas Krastanov; Bulgaria	Marcin Kalata; Poland	Matias Antilla; Finland
Heavyweight	Daniel Galabarov; Bulgaria	Daniel Yankov; Bulgaria	Berat Berisha; Norway	Daniele Matiddi; Italy
Light Heavyweight	Anton Turkalj; Sweden	Kubaibergen Toleubayev; Kazakhstan	Pawel Zakrzewski; Poland	Imad Hoayek; Lebanon
Middleweight	Dario Bellandi; Italy	Khaled Laallam; Sweden	Florian Aberger; Austria	Heytham Rabhi; Sweden
Welterweight	Nikolay Nikolov; Bulgaria	Oskar Biller; Sweden	Axel Karlssoon; Sweden	Jokhar Taimuskhanov; Kazakhstan
Lightweight	Ferdun Osmanov; Bulgaria	Tobias Harila; Sweden	Ziiad Sadaily; Russia	Iordan Marinov; Bulgaria
Featherweight	Delyan Georgiev; Bulgaria	Borislav Angelov; Bulgaria	Hoger Salih; Sweden	Eemil Kurhela; Finland
Bantamweight	Adam Amarasinghe; Great Britain	Mario Moreno; Portugal	Marco Zannetti; Italy	Daryl Clarke; Ireland
Flyweight	Sanan Safrli; Azerbaijan	Nikolay Ivaylov; Bulgaria	Hussain Abdulla; Bahrain	Berik Shinaliyev; Kazakhstan

Women

Event	Gold	Silver	Bronze	
Lightweight	Ofelia Nikolaeva; Bulgaria	Sanna Hyytiäinen; Finland	Nora Nagy; Hungary	N/A
Bantamweight	Cornelia Holm; Sweden	Manon Fiorot; France	Arziko Bregu; Italy	EvaMy Persson; Sweden
Flyweight	Alexandra Kovacs; Hungary	Anette Osterberg; Finland	Anja Saxmark; Sweden	Ilaria Norcia; Italy
Strawweight	Fannie Redman; Sweden	Anna Astvik; Sweden	Sara Cova; Mexico	Antoniya Kalacheva; Bulgaria

=== 2018 IMMAF European Open Championships of Amateur MMA ===
The 2018 IMMAF European Open Championships of Amateur MMA took place at Bucharest, Romania from 18 to 22 June.

==== Medalists ====
Men

Event	Gold	Silver	Bronze	
Super Heavyweight	Dorobantu Mihai; Romania	Damian Vasenjak; Austria	Ivan Ivanov; Bulgaria	N/A
Heavyweight	Ryan Spillane; Ireland	Daniel Yankov; Bulgaria	Besart Berisha; Austria	Matias Anttila; Finland
Light Heavyweight	Murtaza Talha Ali; Bahrain	Anton Turkalj; Sweden	Cathal Manning; Ireland	Pavel Pahomenko; Belarus
Middleweight	Dario Bellandi; Italy	Radu Zarioiu; Romania	Dzmitry Zasinets; Belarus	Tommi Leinonen; Finland
Welterweight	Sola Axel; France	Isakov Issa; Belgium	Yann Liasse; Luxembourg	Josh Hudson; Great Britain
Lightweight	Pavel Senchenko; Ukraine	Kaupo Kokamagi; Estonia	Bogdan Grad; Austria	Iorga Cristian; Romania
Featherweight	Amir Malekpour; Sweden	Mici Saaristo; Finland	Ciaran Breslin; Northern Ireland	Eemil Kurhela; Finland
Bantamweight	Renato Vidovic; Sweden	Denislav Hadzhiev; Bulgaria	Zdravko Dimitrov; Bulgaria	Jonny Touma; Sweden
Flyweight	Oktay Arif; Bulgaria	Giacomo Santoro; Italy	Sebastian Gonzalez; Sweden	Zoran Milic; Sweden

Women

Event	Gold	Silver	Bronze	
Featherweight	Julia Dorny; Germany	Jenni Kivioja; Finland	Fabiana Giampa; Italy	Anniina Ervasti; Finland
Bantamweight	Frida Vastamaki; Sweden	Joanne Doyle; Great Britain	Karolina Hulkko; Finland	Katsiaryna Dziaborava; Belarus
Flyweight	Janika Antinmaa; Finland	Ilaria Norcia; Italy	Ingabjorg Helga Andordottir; Iceland	Ghita Lulia Luiza; Romania
Strawweight	Anna Astvik; Sweden	Nina Back; Sweden	Giulia De Dominicis; Italy	Raluca Dinescu; Romania
Atomweight	Jenna Horto; Finland	Mavru Ana Maria; Romania	Aeilish O Hanlon; Ireland	N/A

=== 2019 IMMAF European Open Championships of Amateur MMA ===
The 2019 IMMAF European Open Championships of Amateur MMA took place at Rome, Italy from 18 to 23 June.

==== Medalists ====
Men

Event	Gold	Silver	Bronze	
Super Heavyweight	Pasha Kharkhachaev; Bahrain	Ruslan Moiseienko; Ukraine	N/A	N/A
Heavyweight	Shamil Gaziev; Bahrain	Gadzhimurad Bagaudinov; Russia	Kimmo Meier; Estonia	Chaddad Alexandre; Lebanon
Light Heavyweight	Igor Glazkov; Russia	Kirill Andreev; Finland	Andreas Knutsson; Sweden	Begai Paulin; France
Middleweight	Magomedkhabib Umarov; Russia	Christian Leroy Duncan; Great Britain	Sola Axel; France	Tommi Leinonen; Finland
Welterweight	Ramazan Gitinov; Bahrain	Evgeny Morozov; Russia	Dario Petrolo; Italy	Rusi Minev; Bulgaria
Lightweight	Salamat Isbulaev; Russia	Antoni Josep Marti Segarra; Spain	Scott Pedersen; Wales	Kaupo Kokomagi; Estonia
Featherweight	Abdulmanap Magomedov; Bahrain	Artem Afanasenko; Ukraine	Delyan Georgiev; Bulgaria	Enrique Hecher Sosa; Spain
Bantamweight	Magomed Idrisov; Bahrain	Alvaro Ucendo; Spain	Magomedrasul Gusengadzhiev; Russia	Denislav Hadzhiev; Bulgaria
Flyweight	Ata Atdayev; Ukraine	Sulejman Bershigadov; Russia	Rafael Calderon Coria; Spain	Abdulla Alyaqoob; Bahrain
Strawweight	Magomed Aliev; Russia	Eduard Kostrytsia; Ukraine	N/A	N/A

Women

Event	Gold	Silver	Bronze	
Lightweight	Yrsa Sandin; Sweden	Sandra Meneses; Sweden	N/A	N/A
Featherweight	Jasmine Favero; Italy	Melissa Mullins; Great Britain	Christina Papasotiriou; Greece	Nadiia Honcharova; Ukraine
Bantamweight	Chambeau Rousseau; France	Megan Morris; Great Britain	Frida Vastamäki; Sweden	Milana Yatimova; Ukraine
Flyweight	Viktoriya Dudakova; Russia	Renaná Bruckstein; Germany	Janika Antinmaa Antinmaa; Finland	Daryna Harbar; Ukraine
Strawweight	Anastasiya Svetkivska; Ukraine	Nina Back; Sweden	Antanina Kuliashova; Belarus	Clara Danssman; Germany
Atomweight	Magdalena Czaban; Poland	Nadine Abbott Bissett; Ireland	Jenna Horto; Finland	Aelish O’Hanlon; Ireland

=== 2021 IMMAF European Open Championships of Amateur MMA ===
The 2021 IMMAF European Open Championships of Amateur MMA took place at Kazan, Russia from 16 to 20 August.

==== Medalists ====
Men

Event	Gold	Silver	Bronze	
Super Heavyweight	Zaurbek Magomedov; Russia	Talgat Zhiyentayev; Kazakhstan	N/A	N/A
Heavyweight	Rasul Magomedov; Bahrain	Omar Aliev; Russia	Maksim Kotelnikov; Russia	Andrey Gaidamaka; Russia
Light Heavyweight	Gadzhimurad Bagaudinov; Russia	Ruslan Shidakov; Russia	Arslan Gadzhiev; Russia	Magomed Gasanov; Russia
Middleweight	Denis Zeinedinov; Russia	Sultan Omarov; Bahrain	Shamil Gadzhimagomedov; Russia	Gadzhi Rasulov; Russia
Welterweight	Ramazan Gitinov; Bahrain	Murad Guseinov; Bahrain	Evgeny Morozov; Russia	Daniil Shirokov; Russia
Lightweight	Omaraskhab Yusupov; Russia	Usman Abasov; Russia	Ali Gadzhiyev; Russia	Ikromjon Ahmedov; Tajikistan
Featherweight	Gadzhimurad Zavaev; Russia	Salman Ramazanov; Russia	Bakhtiyor Husainov; Tajikistan	Magomed Gadzhimuradov; Russia
Bantamweight	Tynyshtyk Zhanibek; Kazakhstan	Sergey Shirkunov; Russia	Amirhamza Islamov; Tajikistan	Kamil Gaziyavdibirov; Russia
Flyweight	Suleyman Bershigadov; Russia	Akhmed Nutsalkhanov; Russia	Dinar Saniev; Russia	Mikhail Ganichkin; Russia

Women

Event	Gold	Silver	Bronze	
Lightweight	Mariya Shirkanova; Russia	Daria Pirogova; Russia	N/A	N/A
Featherweight	Sabrina Laurentina De Sousa; Bahrain	Sara Jozwiak; Poland	Michelle Montague; New Zealand	Alena Agisheva; Russia
Bantamweight	Paulina Kontna; Poland	Ilaria Norcia; Italy	Anastasiya Karmaeva; Russia	Alexandra Zaytseva; Russia
Flyweight	Beatriz Consuli Diniz; Bahrain	Malikat Kuchchaeva; Russia	Sonja Pohjalainen; Finland	Mariya Saburova; Russia
Strawweight	Aieza Ramos Bertolso; Bahrain	Ayan Tursyn; Kazakhstan	Martina Corradi; Italy	Nurzhamal Sadykova; Kazakhstan

== African Championships ==
=== 2016 IMMAF Africa Open Championships ===
The 2016 IMMAF Africa Open Championships commence on Tuesday 30 August and run until the 4 September 2016 at the Brakpan Indoor Sports Centre in Johannesburg.

Hosted by the International Mixed Martial Arts Federation (IMMAF) in association with Mixed Martial Arts South Africa (MMASA) the tournament is Amateur MMA competitors from IMMAF member countries from all across the world. The Africa Open Championships permits 2 representatives per country for each weight class and 4 for the host country, spanning Strawweight to Lightweight for women and Flyweight to Super Heavyweight for men.

The 2016 IMMAF Africa Open Championships will feature on UFC FIGHT PASS and international broadcast channels, post-event.

==== Medalists ====
Men

Event	Gold	Silver	Bronze	
Light Heavyweight	Robin Enontekio; Sweden	Christoffer Hillsjo; Sweden	Andries Boshoff; South Africa	N/A
Middleweight	Scott Kenee; South Africa	Heytham Rabhi; Sweden	Riyaad Pandy; Sweden	N/A
Welterweight	Douw Eksteen; South Africa	Stephen May; South Africa	Axel Karlsson; Poland	Bhoopendra Kumar; Great Britain
Lightweight	Tobias Harila; Sweden	Stephan de la Rey; South Africa	Caleb Ridley; South Africa	Dylan Goosen; South Africa
Featherweight	Hoger Salih; Sweden	Daniel Duda; South Africa	Reece Van Der Merwe; South Africa	Ryan Roets; South Africa
Bantamweight	Luthando Biko; South Africa	Shaun Taylor; South Africa	Mohammed Tafeez Ahmed Mohammed; India	Katiso Matime; South Africa
Flyweight	Serdar Altas; Sweden	Sebastian Gonzalez; Sweden	Wade Kerspuy; South Africa	Siddiq Bin Mahmood; India

Women

Event	Gold	Silver	Bronze
Flyweight	Gabriella Ringblom; Sweden	Imke-Marischca Smit; South Africa	N/A

== Asian Championships ==
=== 2017 IMMAF Asian Open Championships ===
The 2017 IMMAF Asian Open Championships took place at Singapore from 12 to 16 June.

==== Medalists ====
Men

Event	Gold	Silver	Bronze	
Heavyweight	Irman Smajic; Sweden	Chaddad Alexandre; Lebanon	Vishal Surendra Bhardwaj; India	N/A
Light Heavyweight	Imad Hoayek; Lebanon	Anton Turkalj; Sweden	Jing Yi Chong; Malaysia	Kudaibergen Toleubayev; Kazakhstan
Middleweight	Heytham Rabhi; Sweden	Joseph Luciano; Australia	Sam Lawson; Australia	Meirambek Demeubayev; Kazakhstan
Welterweight	Zhan Kenzhebayev; Kazakhstan	Alex Sadovski; Belarus	Axel Karlsson; Sweden	Abbas Khan; Bahrain
Lightweight	Tobias Harila; Sweden	Benjamin Charles Robson; Great Britain	Jokhar Taimuskhanov; Kazakhstan	Nayef Fikey; Bahrain
Featherweight	Abdulmanap Magomedov; Russia	Bekzat Zhassiya; Kazakhstan	Daniel Schalander; Sweden	Junior Faatui; Australia
Bantamweight	Olzhas Moldagaliyev; Kazakhstan	Renato Vidovic; Sweden	Zhen Teng Lim; Singapore	Raf Voza; Great Britain
Flyweight	Yernaz Mussabek; Kazakhstan	Josh Neale; Great Britain	Hussain Abdulla; Bahrain	Roland Yacoubian; Lebanon

Women

Event	Gold	Silver	Bronze	
Flyweight	Gabriella Ringblom; Sweden	Anja Saxmark; Sweden	Alish Smith; Australia	Jihin Radzuan; Malaysia
Strawweight	Hannah Scoggins; United States	Ayan Tursyn; Kazakhstan	Amirah Makhtar; Malaysia	N/A

=== 2019 IMMAF Asian Open Championships ===
The 2019 IMMAF Asian Open Championships took place at Bangkok, Thailand from 1 to 4 May.

==== Medalists ====
Men

Event	Gold	Silver	Bronze	
Super Heavyweight	Pasha Kharkhachaev; Bahrain	N/A	N/A	N/A
Heavyweight	Shamil Gaziev; Bahrain	Bachir Ricardo; Lebanon	Alexandr Dya; Kazakhstan	Eldar Kudarov; Kazakhstan
Light Heavyweight	Magomed Gadzhiiasulov; Bahrain	Serik Abirov; Kazakhstan	N/A	N/A
Middleweight	Madi Dosmukhametov; Kazakhstan	Ramazan Gitinov; Bahrain	Abdulrahman Alhasan; Kazakhstan	Alexander Val; Kazakhstan
Welterweight	Aidyn Tolepbayev; Kazakhstan	Talor Wetere; New Zealand	Cody Barnwell; Australia	Abbas Khan; Bahrain
Lightweight	Shamil Gimbatov; Bahrain	Neimat Assadov; Kazakhstan	Mazhit Sardarov; Kazakhstan	Yousif Sayyar; Bahrain
Featherweight	Anatoliy Zolotykh; Kazakhstan	Elaman Shalkimbekov; Kazakhstan	Yungfeng Li; China	Sarul Rosruen; Thailand
Bantamweight	Olzhas Moldagaliyev; Kazakhstan	Dastan Amangeldy; Kazakhstan	Magomed Idrisov; Bahrain	Ali Yaqoob; Bahrain
Flyweight	Mansur Magomedov; Bahrain	Adilkhan Ayazbayev; Kazakhstan	Mohamed Almuamari; Bahrain	Darkhan Umirbekov; Kazakhstan
Strawweight	Bagdat Zhubanysh; Kazakhstan	Yerulan Kabdulov; Kazakhstan	Brandon Tang; Malaysia	Isa Aldoy; Bahrain

Women

Event	Gold	Silver	Bronze	
Lightweight	Talshyn Zhumatayeva; Kazakhstan	Antonina Kotlyarevskaya; Kazakhstan	N/A	N/A
Bantamweight	Guangmeo Han; China	N/A	N/A	N/A
Flyweight	Alish Smith; Australia	Huihua Ni; China	N/A	N/A
Strawweight	Colleen Augustin; Malaysia	Nurzhamal Sadykova; Kazakhstan	N/A	N/A
Atomweight	Ayan Tursyn; Kazakhstan	Great Britainilay Akhmetualikyzy; Kazakhstan	N/A	N/A
