= Aleksandre Topuria =

Georgian mixed martial artist

- Topuria in 2026
- Born: January 28, 1996 (age 30); Halle, North Rhine-Westphalia, Germany
- Native name: ალექსანდრე თოფურია
- Other names: El Conquistador (The Conqueror)
- Nationality: Georgian
- Height: 5 ft 7 in (170 cm)
- Weight: 135 lb (61 kg; 9 st 9 lb)
- Division: Bantamweight (2025–present); Featherweight
- Reach: 68 in (173 cm)
- Stance: Orthodox
- Fighting out of: Alicante, Spain
- Team: Climent Club (2012–2025); Topuria Team (2025–present)
- Rank: Black belt in Brazilian jiu-jitsu
- Years active: 2015–present

Mixed martial arts record
- Total: 9
- Wins: 7
- By knockout: 3
- By submission: 2
- By decision: 2
- Losses: 2
- By knockout: 1
- By decision: 1

Other information
- Notable relatives: Ilia Topuria (brother)
- Mixed martial arts record from Sherdog

Aleksandre Topuria (Georgian: ალექსანდრე თოფურია; born January 28, 1996) is a Georgian professional mixed martial artist. He currently competes in the Bantamweight division of the Ultimate Fighting Championship (UFC).

== Background ==
In the 1990s, Topuria's family were among Georgians who were ethnically cleansed by pro-Russian separatists in Abkhazia. Topuria's parents were subsequently granted refuge in Germany. It was there that he began training in Greco-Roman wrestling alongside his younger brother Ilia, a pursuit he continued after the family returned to Georgia in 2003.

In 2012, the Topurias moved to Alicante, Spain. After discovering Climent Club, he and his brother committed fully to mixed martial arts, leaving their formal studies to focus entirely on training. In 2018, both brothers were promoted to black belt in Brazilian jiu-jitsu.

== Mixed martial arts career ==
=== Early career ===
Topuria began his professional career with two victories before suffering a TKO loss to Ivo Ivanov in 2015. He then took a six-year hiatus from MMA, returning in 2021 with a win over Lucas Tenório. His first five professional wins all came by first-round finishes, including one in WOW, the main Spanish MMA organization.

=== Ultimate Fighting Championship ===
On August 8, 2024, Topuria announced he had signed with the Ultimate Fighting Championship (UFC). In his UFC debut, he was scheduled to face Cody Haddon at UFC 312 on February 9, 2025. However, Haddon suffered a broken foot which forced him to withdraw from the fight and was replaced by Colby Thicknesse. Topuria won the fight by unanimous decision.

Topuria faced Bekzat Almakhan on November 22, 2025, at UFC Fight Night 265. He won the fight by unanimous decision.

Topuria faced Santiago Luna on November 21, 2026 at UFC Fight Night 294. He lost the fight by split decision. 8 out of 8 media outlets scored the bout for Luna.

== Personal life ==
Topuria currently resides in Alicante, Spain. He is the older brother of former UFC Featherweight and former UFC Lightweight Champion Ilia Topuria. They are both good friends with former UFC Bantamweight Champion Merab Dvalishvili.

He became a father in 2025.

== Mixed martial arts record ==
Professional record breakdown
9 matches	7 wins	2 losses
By knockout	3	1
By submission	2	0
By decision	2	1

Res.	Record	Opponent	Method	Event	Date	Round	Time	Location	Notes
Loss	7–2	Santiago Luna	Decision (split)	UFC Fight Night: Procházka vs. Stirling	November 21, 2026	3	5:00	Al Rayyan, Qatar	
Win	7–1	Bekzat Almakhan	Decision (unanimous)	UFC Fight Night: Tsarukyan vs. Hooker	November 22, 2025	3	5:00	Al Rayyan, Qatar	
Win	6–1	Colby Thicknesse	Decision (unanimous)	UFC 312	February 8, 2025	3	5:00	Sydney, Australia	Bantamweight debut.
Win	5–1	Johan Segas	TKO (punches)	WOW 9	May 20, 2023	1	1:27	Madrid, Spain	Catchweight (139 lb) bout.
Win	4–1	Alberto Ibañez	TKO (submission to punches)	WAR 1	March 12, 2022	1	1:54	Alicante, Spain	
Win	3–1	Lucas Tenório	TKO (punches)	Hombres de Honor 110	December 8, 2021	1	1:48	Ondara, Spain	Catchweight (139 lb) bout.
Loss	2–1	Ivo Ivanov	TKO (punches)	Mix Fight Events 18	May 29, 2015	3	4:10	Valencia, Spain	Catchweight (148 lb) bout.
Win	2–0	Alejandro Rumin	Submission (rear-naked choke)	Climent Show MMA 4	May 9, 2015	1	2:59	Alicante, Spain	
Win	1–0	Andres Braulio Lazaro Chiguano	Submission (armbar)	Mix Fight Events 17	April 4, 2015	1	1:30	Valencia, Spain	Featherweight debut.

== See also ==
- List of current UFC fighters
- List of male mixed martial artists
