= Shamil Gaziev =

Russian and Bahraini mixed martial artist

- Born: Shamil Hasbulatovich Gaziev; February 10, 1990 (age 36); Khunzakh, Dagestan ASSR, Russian SFSR, Soviet Union
- Native name: Газиев Шамиль Хасбулаевич
- Height: 6 ft 4 in (193 cm)
- Weight: 260 lb (118 kg; 18 st 8 lb)
- Division: Heavyweight
- Reach: 78.5 in (199 cm)
- Fighting out of: Manama, Bahrain
- Team: KHK MMA Team
- Years active: 2020–present

Mixed martial arts record
- Total: 19
- Wins: 15
- By knockout: 10
- By submission: 3
- By decision: 2
- Losses: 4
- By knockout: 3
- By decision: 1

Other information
- Mixed martial arts record from Sherdog

Medal record

Amateur mixed martial arts

Representing Bahrain

IMMAF Senior World Championships
Bronze medal – third place	2019 Manama	-120.2 kg

IMMAF European Open Championships
Gold medal – first place	2019 Rome	-120.2 kg

IMMAF Asian Open Championships
Gold medal – first place	2019 Bangkok	-120.2 kg

IMMAF African Open Championships
Gold medal – first place	2019 Johannesburg	-120.2 kg

Shamil Hasbulatovich Gaziev (born February 10, 1990) is a Russian and Bahraini professional mixed martial artist. He currently competes in the Heavyweight division of the Ultimate Fighting Championship (UFC). A professional since 2020, Gaziev earned his UFC contract on Dana White's Contender Series, winning by first round submission.

== Mixed martial arts career ==
=== Early career ===
In 2017, Gaziev was recruited by his childhood friend Eldar Eldarov to move from Dagestan to Bahrain and train with KHK MMA.

Gaziev acquired a record of 7–0 competing exclusively on the Russian and Belarusian regional circuit, winning all seven fights by stoppage inside two rounds.

Gaziev faced fellow undefeated prospect Kirill Kornilov at Ares FC 7 in Paris, France. He won the fight via split decision.

=== BRAVE CF ===
Gaziev then competed under the Brave Combat Federation banner, first competing at Brave CF 65 against Pavel Dailidko on October 28, 2022. He won the fight via second round knockout.

Gaziev next competed against UFC veteran Darko Stošić in the co-main event of Brave CF 69 on February 18, 2023. He won the fight via first round technical knockout.

=== Dana White's Contender Series ===
Gaziev was then booked to compete on Week 7 of Season 7 of Dana White's Contender Series on September 19, 2023, against fellow undefeated prospect Greg Velasco. He won the fight via first round submission and was awarded a contract by Dana White.

=== Ultimate Fighting Championship ===
After earning his contract, Gaziev made his UFC debut at UFC 296 against Martin Buday on December 16, 2023. He won the fight via technical knockout in the second round. This would earn Gaziev Performance of the Night.

Gaziev was booked for his first UFC main event opposite Jairzinho Rozenstruik at UFC Fight Night 238 on March 2, 2024. He suffered the first professional loss of his career after retiring from his corner at the end of the fourth round.

Gaziev faced Don'Tale Mayes at UFC on ABC 7 on August 3, 2024. Gaziev rebounded from his first career loss, winning a unanimous decision.

Gaziev faced Thomas Petersen at UFC Fight Night 250 on February 1, 2025. He won the fight by technical knockout in the first round.

Gaziev was scheduled to face Serghei Spivac on May 17, 2025, at UFC Fight Night 256. However, for unknown reasons, their bout was moved to UFC 316 which was set to take place on June 7, 2025. However, Gaziev pulled out due to a broken finger sustained during training and was replaced by Waldo Cortes-Acosta.

The bout between Gaziev and Spivac has been re-scheduled to take place on November 22, 2025, at UFC Fight Night 265. However, Spivac withdrew from the bout for unknown reasons and was replaced by Waldo Cortes-Acosta. Gaziev lost the fight by knockout in the first round.

Gaziev faced Brando Peričić on May 2, 2026 at UFC Fight Night 275. He lost the fight via knockout in round two. The bout earned both fighters the Fight of the Night award.

Gaziev faced Kennedy Nzechukwu on August 22, 2026 at UFC Fight Night 285. He won the fight via knockout in round one.

Gaziev faced Tallison Teixeira on November 21, 2026 at UFC Fight Night 294. He lost the fight by unanimous decision.

== Personal life ==
Gaziev currently resides in Manama, Bahrain, where he trains with the KHK MMA Team. Gaziev represents Bahrain in his professional career, making him the first fighter to represent the nation in the UFC.

== Championships and accomplishments ==
- Ultimate Fighting Championship
  - Performance of the Night (One time) vs. Martin Buday
  - Fight of the Night (One time) vs. Brando Peričić

== Mixed martial arts record ==
Professional record breakdown
19 matches	15 wins	4 losses
By knockout	10	3
By submission	3	0
By decision	2	1

Res.	Record	Opponent	Method	Event	Date	Round	Time	Location	Notes
Loss	15–4	Tallison Teixeira	Decision (unanimous)	UFC Fight Night: Procházka vs. Stirling	November 21, 2026	3	5:00	Al Rayyan, Qatar	
Win	15–3	Kennedy Nzechukwu	KO (punch)	UFC Fight Night: Hernandez vs. Rodrigues	August 22, 2026	1	1:20	Sacramento, California, United States	
Loss	14–3	Brando Peričić	KO (punch)	UFC Fight Night: Della Maddalena vs. Prates	May 2, 2026	2	3:44	Perth, Australia	Fight of the Night.
Loss	14–2	Waldo Cortes-Acosta	KO (punch)	UFC Fight Night: Tsarukyan vs. Hooker	November 22, 2025	1	1:22	Al Rayyan, Qatar	
Win	14–1	Thomas Petersen	TKO (punch)	UFC Fight Night: Adesanya vs. Imavov	February 1, 2025	1	3:12	Riyadh, Saudi Arabia	
Win	13–1	Don'Tale Mayes	Decision (unanimous)	UFC on ABC: Sandhagen vs. Nurmagomedov	August 3, 2024	3	5:00	Abu Dhabi, United Arab Emirates	
Loss	12–1	Jairzinho Rozenstruik	TKO (retirement)	UFC Fight Night: Rozenstruik vs. Gaziev	March 2, 2024	4	5:00	Las Vegas, Nevada, United States	
Win	12–0	Martin Buday	TKO (punches)	UFC 296	December 16, 2023	2	0:56	Las Vegas, Nevada, United States	Performance of the Night.
Win	11–0	Greg Velasco	Submission (rear-naked choke)	Dana White's Contender Series 63	September 19, 2023	1	2:38	Las Vegas, Nevada, United States	
Win	10–0	Darko Stošić	TKO (punches)	Brave CF 69	February 18, 2023	1	2:54	Belgrade, Serbia	
Win	9–0	Pavel Dailidko	KO (punches)	Brave CF 65	October 28, 2022	2	0:46	Isa Town, Bahrain	
Win	8–0	Kirill Kornilov	Decision (split)	Ares FC 7	June 25, 2022	3	5:00	Paris, France	
Win	7–0	Aleksandr Kolomytsev	Submission (rear-naked choke)	ProFC 70	March 27, 2022	1	2:13	Rostov-on-Don, Russia	
Win	6–0	Grigoriy Ponomarev	TKO (knees and punches)	AMC Fight Nights 104	September 24, 2021	1	2:56	Sochi, Russia	
Win	5–0	Murad Adyrbaev	Submission (rear-naked choke)	Belarusian FC: Contender Series 7	July 29, 2021	1	0:59	Minsk, Belarus	
Win	4–0	Alexey Druzhinin	TKO (punches)	MMA Series 29	April 3, 2021	1	0:33	Minsk, Belarus	Return to Heavyweight.
Win	3–0	Vladislav Kozlovskiy	TKO (punches)	Belarusian FC 66	February 27, 2021	1	0:35	Minsk, Belarus	Light Heavyweight debut.
Win	2–0	Artur Bunkov	TKO (punches)	MMA Series 22	December 12, 2020	1	0:20	Kaliningrad, Russia	
Win	1–0	Denis Gvozdev	TKO (punches)	Belarusian FC 63	October 24, 2020	1	0:23	Minsk, Belarus	Heavyweight debut.

== See also ==
- List of current UFC fighters
- List of Dana White's Contender Series alumni
- List of male mixed martial artists
