= Bekzat Almakhan =

Kazakh mixed martial artist (born 1997)

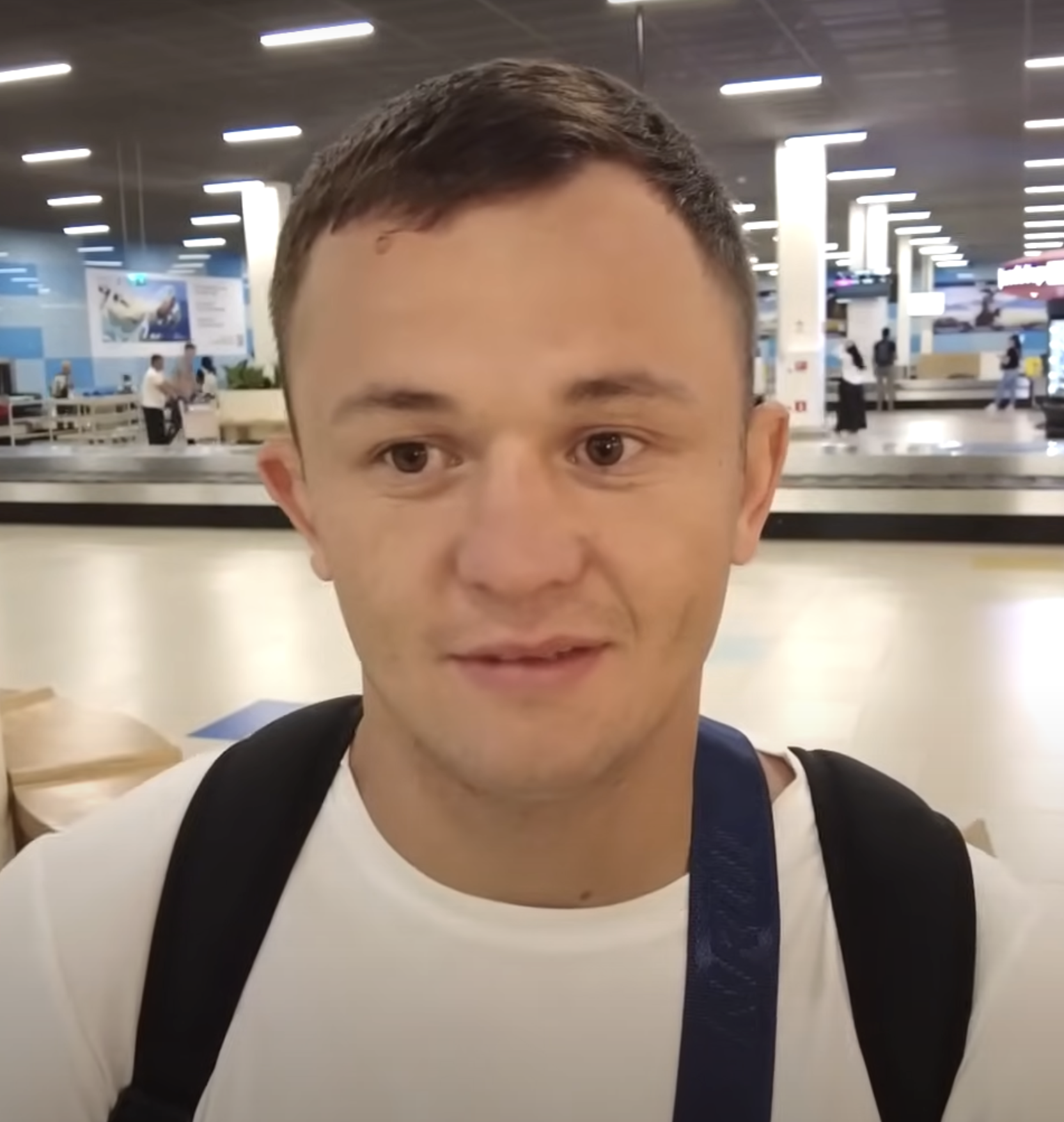
- Born: Bekzat Almakhan; October 8, 1997 (age 29); Akzhar, Bayzak District, Jambyl Region, Kazakhstan
- Nickname: Turan Warrior
- Height: 5 ft 7 in (1.70 m)
- Weight: 135 lb (61 kg; 9 st 9 lb)
- Division: Bantamweight
- Reach: 68 in (173 cm)
- Stance: Orthodox
- Fighting out of: Almaty, Kazakhstan
- Team: DDV Team 777
- Trainer: Danesh Dungenbay
- Years active: 2018–present

Mixed martial arts record
- Total: 16
- Wins: 12
- By knockout: 10
- By submission: 1
- By decision: 1
- Losses: 4
- By submission: 1
- By decision: 3

Amateur record
- Total: 11
- Wins: 11
- By knockout: 5
- By submission: 2
- By decision: 3

Other information
- Mixed martial arts record from Sherdog

Bekzat Almakhan (Kazakh: Бекзат Алмахан, bekˈzɑt ɑlˈmɑˈhɑn; born October 8, 1997) is a Kazakh professional mixed martial artist. He competed in the Bantamweight division of the Ultimate Fighting Championship (UFC).

== Background ==
Bekzat Almakhan was born on October 8, 1997, in the village of Akzhar, in the southern part of Kazakhstan and grew up in the city of Taraz. There, from 3rd grade up until graduation, he practiced Karate for about eight years, and Boxing for a year and a half. As an adult, he moved to Almaty, where he subsequently began his professional career in MMA. After entering university, he became interested in MMА and started to train professionally.

== Mixed martial arts career ==
=== Early career ===
Almakhan made his professional MMA debut against Ser-od Bilguun on July 28, 2018, at Alash Pride FC - Alash Pride. He won the bout via TKO due to a corner stoppage. In 2020, he suffered his first defeat at Bushido Kazakhstan - Grand Prix of Bushido Qazaqstan, losing to fighter Sultan Zholdoshbek.

==== Sherdog's stats ====
In the past, Almakhan's record on the site totaled 17 wins and one loss, but the Sherdog team reduced it to 11–1 after it was discovered that a number of victories were not won under the rules of classical MMA.

=== Ultimate Fighting Championship ===
Almakhan was offered a contract by the UFC to go up against undefeated prospect Umar Nurmagomedov at UFC Fight Night 238 on March 2, 2024. Nurmagomedov was knocked down early in the first round by Almahan, but recovered to control the remainder of the fight with ground strikes and grappling. Nurmagomedov won by unanimous decision.

Almakhan faced Brad Katona on May 10, 2025, at UFC 315. He won the fight by knockout in the first round.

Almakhan faced Aleksandre Topuria on November 22, 2025, at UFC Fight Night 265. He lost the fight by unanimous decision.

Almakhan faced Jean Matsumoto on June 27, 2026 at UFC Fight Night 280. He lost the fight by unanimous decision.

On August 12, 2026, it was reported that Almakhan was removed from the UFC roster.

== Mixed martial arts record ==
Professional record breakdown
16 matches	12 wins	4 losses
By knockout	10	0
By submission	1	1
By decision	1	3

Res.	Record	Opponent	Method	Event	Date	Round	Time	Location	Notes
Loss	12–4	Jean Matsumoto	Decision (unanimous)	UFC Fight Night: Fiziev vs. Torres	June 27, 2026	3	5:00	Baku, Azerbaijan	
Loss	12–3	Aleksandre Topuria	Decision (unanimous)	UFC Fight Night: Tsarukyan vs. Hooker	November 22, 2025	3	5:00	Al Rayyan, Qatar	
Win	12–2	Brad Katona	KO (punches)	UFC 315	May 10, 2025	1	1:04	Montreal, Quebec, Canada	
Loss	11–2	Umar Nurmagomedov	Decision (unanimous)	UFC Fight Night: Rozenstruik vs. Gaziev	March 2, 2024	3	5:00	Las Vegas, Nevada, United States	
Win	11–1	Yan Ferraz	TKO (punches)	Octagon 52	November 18, 2023	3	4:58	Almaty, Kazakhstan	
Win	10–1	Mateus Rodrigues Gloria	KO (head kick and punches)	Octagon 47	July 22, 2023	1	0:07	Almaty, Kazakhstan	
Win	9–1	Mauro Mastromarini	Decision (unanimous)	UAE Warriors 36	February 25, 2023	3	5:00	Abu Dhabi, United Arab Emirates	
Win	8–1	Jenilton Matos	TKO (corner stoppage)	Octagon 38	December 21, 2022	2	5:00	Almaty, Kazakhstan	
Win	7–1	Geovane Vargas	TKO (head kick)	Octagon 32	July 1, 2022	3	3:07	Almaty, Kazakhstan	
Win	6–1	Sabuhi Guliyev	TKO (punches)	Octagon 29	March 24, 2022	1	4:35	Almaty, Kazakhstan	Return to Bantamweight.
Win	5–1	Fuad Musaev	TKO (submission to punches)	MMA Series 43	October 30, 2021	1	4:23	Moscow, Russia	Featherweight debut.
Win	4–1	Bekzhan Utemisov	Submission (rear-naked choke)	Octagon 20	June 16, 2021	3	1:17	Almaty, Kazakhstan	
Loss	3–1	Sultan Zholdoshbek	Submission (guillotine choke)	Bushido Qazaqstan FC 3	October 25, 2020	2	0:44	Almaty, Kazakhstan	
Win	3–0	Aydin Kodekov	TKO (doctor stoppage)	Bushido Qazaqstan FC 3	October 25, 2020	1	3:33	Almaty, Kazakhstan	
Win	2–0	Talgat Khalmuratov	TKO (punches)	Bushido Qazaqstan FC 3	October 25, 2020	3	3:03	Almaty, Kazakhstan	
Win	1–0	Ser-od Bilguun	TKO (corner stoppage)	Alash Pride FC: Alash Pride 8	July 28, 2018	2	3:11	Kapchagay, Kazakhstan	Bantamweight debut.

Exhibition record breakdown		
11 matches	11 wins	0 losses
By knockout	5	0
By submission	3	0
By decision	3	0

Res.	Record	Opponent	Method	Event	Date	Round	Time	Location	Notes
Win	11–0	Boris Ignatiev	Decision (unanimous)	Zhekpe Zhek	December 4, 2021	2	5:00	Almaty, Kazakhstan	
Win	10–0	Rauan Bekbolat	TKO (corner stoppage)	Zhekpe Zhek	March 1, 2020	2	2:55	Almaty, Kazakhstan	
Win	9–0	Ser-od Bilguun	Submission (armbar)	Zhekpe Zhek	January 17, 2019	2	3:13	Kazakhstan	
Win	8–0	Nurgeldy Mukhtarov	TKO (punches)	Zhekpe Zhek	January 17, 2019	1	1:24	Kazakhstan	
Win	7–0	Aibol Akhmetov	Decision (unanimous)	Zhekpe Zhek	March 3, 2019	2	5:00	Kapchagay, Kazakhstan	
Win	6–0	Sergey Morozov	Decision (unanimous)	AFCA / Fight Club 777	May 8, 2018	3	5:00	Almaty, Kazakhstan	
Win	5–0	Farabi Sautbaev	Submission (armbar)	AFCA / Fight Club 777	May 8, 2018	1	1:35	Almaty, Kazakhstan	
Win	4–0	Temirlan Zhumabek	TKO (punches)	Zhekpe Zhek	November 3, 2017	1	0:00	Taldykorgan, Kazakhstan	
Win	3–0	Elmurat Umarov	KO (punch)	Zhekpe Zhek	November 3, 2017	1	3:37	Taldykorgan, Kazakhstan	
Win	2–0	Manibek Nabiev	TKO (punches)	Zhekpe Zhek	January 27, 2017	2	3:32	Almaty, Kazakhstan	
Win	1–0	Asylbek Salizhanov	KO (punch)	Zhekpe Zhek	September 10, 2016	1	1:35	Turkistan, Kazakhstan	

== See also ==
- List of male mixed martial artists
