= Marek Bujło =

Polish mixed martial artist (born 1993)

- Born: October 10, 1993 (age 33); Ełk, Poland
- Other names: Bujdzilla
- Height: 6 ft 4 in (1.93 m)
- Weight: 240 lb (109 kg; 17 st 2 lb)
- Division: Heavyweight (2021–present)
- Reach: 78 in (198 cm)
- Style: Brazilian jiu-jitsu
- Stance: Orthodox
- Fighting out of: Ełk, Poland
- Team: Grappler Ełk
- Rank: Black belt in Brazilian jiu-jitsu
- Years active: 2021–present

Mixed martial arts record
- Total: 9
- Wins: 8
- By knockout: 5
- By submission: 3
- Losses: 1
- By decision: 1

Other information
- Mixed martial arts record from Sherdog

Marek Bujło (born October 10, 1993) is a Polish professional mixed martial artist. He competed in the Heavyweight division of the Ultimate Fighting Championship.

== Amateur career ==
Bujło competed in many competitions in Brazilian jiu-jitsu and would always rank high. The first of these tournaments came in 2019 in the Polish Cup. He placed 1st in the Absoluto weight class. He would also win a silver medal during the same tournament in the 99 kg category.

The following year, he competed in the IBJJF Championship in the Munich International Open. He placed third in the Super-Heavy category.

A year later, he competed in two competitions. The first of which, took place in Warsaw where he obtained a bronze medal in the +99 kg category. Later that year, he competed in Konin where he placed 1st in the +100.5 kg category.

In 2022, he competed in three tournaments and four competitions. The first one being in Poznań where he yet again placed first in the +97.5 kg category. The next one would be in Madrid during the Madrid International Open where he placed second in the Open Class and Ultra-Heavy categories. The last one took place in Gniezno where he once again won the gold medal in the +100.5 kg category.

2023 was the last year he competed in tournaments. His last tournament took place in Warsaw where he once again won a gold medal in the +100.5 kg category.

In 2025, he made his return to tournaments, competing in the 2025 Polish Championships in No Gi Jiu-jitsu. He placed second in the +97.5 kg category for black belts.

== Mixed martial arts career ==
=== Early career ===
Bujło made his professional debut on November 13, 2021 for the promotion Strife MMA. He faced Grzegorz Joński whom he beat via Submission in the first round.

After a 3 year hiatus, Bujło returned to the cage on April 5, 2024 where he faced off against Igor Kurkowski whom he beat via Submission in the first round.

7 months later on November 9, he fought again where he faced off against Błażej Nagórski. Bujło won the fight via Submission within the first minute of the first round raising his record to 3–0.

2 weeks later, he returned to the cage for promotion BFN MMA, where he faced Tomasz Kolcun. Bujło assert his dominance and defeat Kolcun via TKO in the first round.

After a half-year layoff, he returned on May 10, 2025 against his most experienced opponent yet in Maicon Douglas. Bujło won via TKO thirty seconds into the first round.

His final fight in Poland came a month later on June 14 against Gurami Zviadadze. Bujło won the fight via a first-round TKO.

=== Ultimate Fighting Championship ===
On September 16, 2025, it was reported that Bujło had signed with the Ultimate Fighting Championship.

Bujło was scheduled to face promotional newcomer José Luiz on November 22, 2025, at UFC Fight Night 265. However, Luiz was later replaced for undisclosed reasons by current LFA Heavyweight Champion Denzel Freeman, who also made his promotional debut. Bujło lost the fight by unanimous decision.

On November 27, 2025, it was reported that Bujło was removed from the UFC roster, despite Bujło being offered an opportunity for UFC 324 but had to decline due to health issues.

=== Post-UFC career ===
Following his departure from the UFC, it was announced on January 6, 2026, that he will be returning to fighting, with his next fight being against Dirlei Broenstrup on April 11, 2026, in his hometown of Ełk. Bujło won the fight via a second-round TKO.

His next fight came seven months later on November 21, against Wesley Martins. Bujło won the fight via a first-round TKO.

== Championships and accomplishments ==
=== Brazilian jiu-jitsu ===
- 2019: Polish Cup in jiu-jitsu - 1st place in Absoluto category (Warsaw)
- 2019: Polish Cup in jiu-jitsu - 2nd place in -98.9 kg category (Warsaw)
- 2020: IBJJF jiu-jitsu Championship - 3rd place in Super Heavy category (Munich)
- 2021: Polish jiu-jitsu Championships - 3rd place in +99 kg category (Warsaw)
- 2021: Polish Cup in jiu-jitsu - 1st place in +100.5 kg category (Konin)
- 2022: Polish jiu-jitsu Championships - 1st place in +97. kg category (Poznań)
- 2022: IBJJF jiu-jitsu Championship - 2nd place in Ultra Heavy category (Madrid)
- 2022: IBJJF jiu-jitsu Championship - 2nd place in Open Class category (Madrid)
- 2022: Polish jiu-jitsu Championships - 1st place in +100.5 kg category (Gniezno)
- 2023: Polish jiu-jitsu Championships - 1st place in +100.5 kg category (Warsaw)
- 2025: Polish no-gi jiu-jitsu Championships - 2nd place in +97.5 kg category (Poznań)

== Mixed martial arts record ==
Professional record breakdown
9 matches	8 wins	1 loss
By knockout	5	0
By submission	3	0
By decision	0	1

Res.	Record	Opponent	Method	Event	Date	Round	Time	Location	Notes
Win	8–1	Wesley Martins	TKO (punches)	Unia Sportów Walki 39	November 21, 2026	1	1:18	Bialystok, Poland	
Win	7–1	Dirlei Broenstrup	TKO (punches)	Masurian FC 1	April 11, 2026	2	1:59	Ełk, Poland	
Loss	6–1	Denzel Freeman	Decision (unanimous)	UFC Fight Night: Tsarukyan vs. Hooker	November 22, 2025	3	5:00	Al Rayyan, Qatar	
Win	6–0	Gurami Zviadadze	TKO (punches)	Unia Sportów Walki 36	June 14, 2025	1	0:50	Grajewo, Poland	
Win	5–0	Maicon Douglas	TKO (punches)	Bartoszyce Fight Night 5	May 10, 2025	1	0:35	Ełk, Poland	
Win	4–0	Tomasz Kolcun	TKO (punches)	Bartoszyce Fight Night 3	November 23, 2024	1	1:28	Olsztyn, Poland	
Win	3–0	Błażej Nagórski	Submission (ankle lock)	Unia Sportów Walki 35	November 9, 2024	1	0:54	Grajewo, Poland	
Win	2–0	Igor Krukowski	Submission (kimura)	Bartoszyce Fight Night 2	April 5, 2024	1	1:42	Bartoszyce, Poland	
Win	1–0	Grzegorz Joński	Submission (rear-naked choke)	Strife 1	November 13, 2021	1	1:30	Puławy, Poland	Heavyweight debut.

== See also ==
- List of male mixed martial artists
