= PFL Challenger Series =

PFL Challenger Series was an American mixed martial arts competition produced by the Professional Fighters League in 2022–2023. Male and female MMA prospects competed for a slot in the upcoming PFL tournament season and a chance at $1 million. The Series have a rotating celebrity guest panel, featuring personalities in film, athletics, and music. Mike Tyson, along with NFL stars Ray Lewis and Todd Gurley have served as judges.

== Season One ==
The PFL Challenger Series debuted on fuboTV. The eight events streamed on consecutive Friday nights starting Feb. 18, and run through March. It also aired on its linear network, Fubo Sports Network.

=== Week 1 - February 18 ===
PFL Challenger Series 1
- Promotion: PFL Challenger Series
- Date: February 18, 2022
- Venue: Universal Studios Florida
- City: Orlando, Florida, United States

Main Card
Weight class				Method	Round	Time	Notes
Light Heavyweight	Josh Silveira	def.	Mohamed Juma	Submission (rear-naked choke)	3	1:52
Light Heavyweight	Taylor Johnson	def.	Alexander Poppeck	Decision (unanimous) (29–28, 29–28, 29–28)	3	5:00
Light Heavyweight	Bruce Souto	def.	Travis Davis	KO (flying knee and punches)	1	4:43
Light Heavyweight	Karl Williams	def.	Miles Amos	Decision (unanimous) (30–27, 30–27, 30–26)	3	5:00

==== Contract awards ====
The following fighters were awarded contracts with the PFL:

- Bruce Souto

=== Week 2 - February 25 ===
PFL Challenger Series 2
- Promotion: PFL Challenger Series
- Date: February 25, 2022
- Venue: Universal Studios Florida
- City: Orlando, Florida, United States

Main Card
Weight class				Method	Round	Time	Notes
Catchweight (177 lb)	Jarrah Al Silawi	def.	Michael Lilly	KO (knee)	1	2:54
Welterweight	Dilano Taylor	def.	Mark Martin	TKO (doctor stoppage)	1	5:00
Welterweight	Carlos Leal	def.	Korey Kuppe	TKO (punches)	1	0:56
Catchweight (173.6 lb)	Chris Mixan	def.	Nathan Pierce	TKO (punches)	2	1:29	(Note: Originally a welterweight bout; Pierce missed weight.)

==== Contract awards ====
The following fighters were awarded contracts with the PFL:

- Jarrah Al Silawi
- Chris Mixan was signed to a development league contract

=== Week 3 - March 4 ===
PFL Challenger Series 3
- Promotion: PFL Challenger Series
- Date: March 4, 2022
- Venue: Universal Studios Florida
- City: Orlando, Florida, United States

Main Card
Weight class				Method	Round	Time	Notes
Women's Lightweight	Martina Jindrova	def.	Jacqueline Cavalcanti	Decision (split) (29–28, 28–29, 29–28)	3	5:00
Women's Lightweight	Jackie Cataline	def.	Camee Adams	Technical Submission (rear-naked choke)	1	2:41
Women's Lightweight	Jeslen Mishelle	def.	Julia Dorny	TKO (punches)	1	3:51
Women's Lightweight	Michelle Montague	def.	Olivia Parker	Submission (rear-naked choke)	1	3:57

==== Contract awards ====
The following fighters were awarded contracts with the PFL:

- Martina Jindrová

=== Week 4 - March 11 ===
PFL Challenger Series 4
- Promotion: PFL Challenger Series
- Date: March 11, 2022
- Venue: Universal Studios Florida
- City: Orlando, Florida, United States

Main Card
Weight class				Method	Round	Time	Notes
Featherweight	Reinaldo Ekson	def.	Mike Barnett	Decision (unanimous) (30–27, 30–27, 29–28)	3	5:00
Featherweight	Edwin Cooper Jr.	def.	Troy Lamson	Decision (unanimous) (29–28, 29–28, 29–27)	3	5:00
Catchweight (148.6 lb)	Boston Salmon	def.	Do Gyeom Lee	TKO (corner stoppage)	2	5:00	(Note: Originally a featherweight bout; Lee missed weight.)
Featherweight	Brahyan Zurcher	def.	Scottie Stockman	Decision (unanimous) (29–28, 29–28, 29–28)	3	5:00

==== Contract awards ====
The following fighters were awarded contracts with the PFL:

- Boston Salmon

=== Week 5 - March 18 ===
PFL Challenger Series 5
- Promotion: PFL Challenger Series
- Date: March 18, 2022
- Venue: Universal Studios Florida
- City: Orlando, Florida, United States

Main Card
Weight class				Method	Round	Time	Notes
Catchweight (156.2 lb)	Bruno Miranda	def.	Carson Frei	TKO (punches)	3	3:40	(Note: Originally a lightweight bout; Miranda missed weight.)
Lightweight	Damir Ferhatbegovic	def.	B.J. Bland	KO (punches)	1	2:41
Lightweight	Michael Dufort	def.	Arut Pogosjan	Submission (rear-naked choke)	2	4:02
Lightweight	Yanal Ashmouz	def.	D.J. Hughes Jr.	Decision (unanimous) (30–27, 30–27, 30–27)	3	5:00

==== Contract awards ====
The following fighters were awarded contracts with the PFL:

- Bruno Miranda

=== Week 6 - March 25 ===
PFL Challenger Series 6
- Promotion: PFL Challenger Series
- Date: March 25, 2022
- Venue: Universal Studios Florida
- City: Orlando, Florida, United States

Main Card
Weight class				Method	Round	Time	Notes
Heavyweight	Marcelo Nunes	def.	Bevon Lewis	Submission (arm-triangle choke)	2	2:39
Heavyweight	Giacomo Lemos	def.	Billy Swanson	TKO (punches)	2	0:33
Heavyweight	Adam Keresh	def.	Chad Johnson	TKO (punches)	1	3:34
Heavyweight	Daiqwon Buckley	def.	Jon Cunningham	TKO (punches)	2	1:46

==== Contract awards ====
The following fighters were awarded contracts with the PFL:

- Adam Keresh

=== Week 7 - April 1 ===
PFL Challenger Series 7
- Promotion: PFL Challenger Series
- Date: April 1, 2022
- Venue: Universal Studios Florida
- City: Orlando, Florida, United States

The event featured every fighter made their mixed martial arts debut.

Main Card
Weight class				Method	Round	Time	Notes
Catchweight (172.6 lb)	Andrija Stankovic	def.	Louis Brewington	Decision (unanimous) (30–27, 30–27, 30–27)	3	5:00	(Note: Originally a welterweight bout; Brewington missed weight.)
Lightweight	Christian Turner	def.	Chayanne Serrano	Decision (unanimous) (29–28, 29–28, 29–28)	3	5:00
Lightweight	Alexei Pergande	def.	Joe Hamm	Submission (arm-triangle choke)	2	4:42
Heavyweight	Rakim Talley	def.	Santino Zurita	Decision (unanimous) (30–27, 30–27, 30–27)	3	5:00
Featherweight	Daeri Alderman	def.	Jaylong McDaniel	Decision (unanimous) (29–28, 29–28, 29–28)	3	5:00

==== Contract awards ====
The following fighters were awarded contracts with the PFL:

- Alexei Pergande was signed to a development league contract

=== Week 8 - April 8 ===
PFL Challenger Series 8
- Promotion: PFL Challenger Series
- Date: April 8, 2022
- Venue: Universal Studios Florida
- City: Orlando, Florida, United States

Main Card
Weight class				Method	Round	Time	Notes
Catchweight (175.6 lb)	Carlos Leal	def.	Chris Brown	Decision (split) (29–28, 28–29, 29–28)	3	5:00	(Note: Originally a welterweight bout; Leal (171.2) and Brown (175.6) missed weight.)
Light Heavyweight	Simeon Powell	def.	Tobias Baker	Decision (unanimous) (30–27, 30–27, 30–27)	3	5:00
Women's Lightweight	Jeslen Mishelle	def.	Jackie Cataline	Decision (unanimous) (29–28, 29–28, 29–28)	3	5:00
Catchweight (148.2 lb)	Ali Zebian	def.	Aaron Blackie	Decision (unanimous) (29–28, 29–28, 29–28)	3	5:00	(Note: Originally a featherweight bout; Zebian missed weight.)

==== Contract awards ====
The following fighters were awarded contracts with the PFL:

- Simeon Powell

== Season 2 ==
=== Week 1 - January 27 ===
PFL Challenger Series 9
- Promotion: PFL Challenger Series
- Date: January 27, 2023
- Venue: Universal Studios Florida
- City: Orlando, Florida, United States

Main Card (FuboTV)
Weight class				Method	Round	Time	Notes
Welterweight	Itso Babulaidze	def.	Lucas Barbosa	Decision (unanimous) (29–28, 29–28, 30–27)	3	5:00
Welterweight	Thad Jean	def.	Eric Alequin	Decision (unanimous) (30–27, 30–27, 30–27)	3	5:00
Welterweight	Zach Juusola	def.	Jozef Wittner	Decision (unanimous) (30–27, 30–27, 30–27)	3	5:00
Catchweight (175 lb)	Kendly St. Louis	def.	Nick Alley	Submission (rear-naked choke)	2	2:17

==== Contract awards ====
The following fighters were awarded contracts with the PFL:

- Thad Jean

=== Week 2 - February 3 ===
PFL Challenger Series 10
- Promotion: PFL Challenger Series
- Date: February 3, 2023
- Venue: Universal Studios Florida
- City: Orlando, Florida, United States

Main Card (FuboTV)
Weight class				Method	Round	Time	Notes
Women's Featherweight	Amanda Leve	def.	Naranjargal Tsend-Ayush	Decision (unanimous) (29–28, 29–28, 29–28)	3	5:00
Catchweight (146.8 lb)	Evelyn Martins	def.	Jeslen Mishelle	Submission (rear-naked choke)	2	1:38	(Note: Originally a featherweight bout; Martins missed weight.)
Women's Featherweight	Jackie Cataline	def.	Senna van der Veerdonk	TKO (punches)	1	4:09
Women's Featherweight	Michelle Montague	def.	Shaquita Amador Woods	Submission (rear-naked choke)	2	4:45

==== Contract awards ====
The following fighters were awarded contracts with the PFL:

- Amanda Leve

=== Week 3 - February 10 ===
PFL Challenger Series 11
- Promotion: PFL Challenger Series
- Date: February 10, 2023
- Venue: Universal Studios Florida
- City: Orlando, Florida, United States

Main Card (FuboTV)
Weight class				Method	Round	Time	Notes
Heavyweight	Danilo Marques	def.	Ras Hylton	Submission (rear-naked choke)	2	2:33
Heavyweight	Isaiah Pinson	def.	Vitor Resende	Decision (unanimous) (29–28, 30–27, 29–28)	3	5:00
Heavyweight	Abraham Bably	def.	Hassan Graham	TKO (punches)	1	3:56
Heavyweight	Louie Sutherland	def.	Alton Meeks	TKO (knee and punches)	2	1:25

==== Contract awards ====
The following fighters were awarded contracts with the PFL:

- Abraham Bably

=== Week 4 - February 17 ===
PFL Challenger Series 12
- Promotion: PFL Challenger Series
- Date: February 17, 2023
- Venue: Universal Studios Florida
- City: Orlando, Florida, United States

Main Card (FuboTV)
Weight class				Method	Round	Time	Notes
Catchweight (157.2 lb)	Elvin Espinoza	def.	Damir Ferhatbegović	Submission (rear-naked choke)	2	1:53	(Note: Originally a lightweight bout; Ferhatbegović missed weight.)
Lightweight	Manoel Sousa	def.	Paulo Henrique	Decision (split) (29–28, 28–29, 29–28)	3	5:00
Lightweight	Anthony Romero	def.	Antonio Caruso	Decision (unanimous) (30–26, 30–26, 30–26)	3	5:00
Lightweight	Charlie Decca	def.	José Aguayo	Decision (unanimous) (30–27, 30–27, 30–27)	3	5:00

==== Contract awards ====
The following fighters were awarded contracts with the PFL:

- Elvin Espinoza

=== Week 5 - February 24 ===
PFL Challenger Series 13
- Promotion: PFL Challenger Series
- Date: February 24, 2023
- Venue: Universal Studios Florida
- City: Orlando, Florida, United States

Main Card (FuboTV)
Weight class				Method	Round	Time	Notes
Women's Flyweight	Kaytlin Neil	def.	Katherine Corogenes	Decision (unanimous) (29–27, 29–27, 29–27)	3	5:00	(Note: Corogenes was deducted 1 point in Round 3 for an eye poke.)
Catchweight (127.6 lb)	Shanna Young	def.	Sandra Lavado	Decision (unanimous) (30–27, 30–27, 29–28)	3	5:00	(Note: Originally a flyweight bout; Lavado missed weight)
Women's Flyweight	Desiree Yanez	def.	Maíra Mazar	Decision (unanimous) (29–28, 30–27, 29–28)	3	5:00
Women's Flyweight	Lisa Mauldin	def.	Helen Peralta	TKO (punches)	3	3:51

==== Contract awards ====
The following fighters were awarded contracts with the PFL:

- Desiree Yanez

=== Week 6 - March 3 ===
PFL Challenger Series 14
- Promotion: PFL Challenger Series
- Date: March 3, 2023
- Venue: Universal Studios Florida
- City: Orlando, Florida, United States

Main Card (FuboTV)
Weight class				Method	Round	Time	Notes
Featherweight	Brahyan Zurcher	def.	David Evans	Submission (neck crank)	2	1:37
Featherweight	Nathan Kelly	def.	Zachary Hicks	Submission (arm-triangle choke)	1	2:30
Featherweight	Gabriel Alves Braga	def.	Ago Huskić	Decision (unanimous) (30–25, 30–27, 29–28)	3	5:00
Featherweight	James Gonzalez	def.	Vikas Singh Rhul	TKO (punches)	1	4:20

==== Contract awards ====
The following fighters were awarded contracts with the PFL:

- Brahyan Zurcher

=== Week 7 - March 10 ===
PFL Challenger Series 15
- Promotion: PFL Challenger Series
- Date: March 10, 2023
- Venue: Universal Studios Florida
- City: Orlando, Florida, United States

Main Card (FuboTV)
Weight class				Method	Round	Time	Notes
Light Heavyweight	Impa Kasanganay	def.	Osama Elseady	TKO (punches)	1	4:15
Light Heavyweight	Taylor Johnson	def.	Trey Williams	TKO (punches)	1	1:20
Light Heavyweight	Billy Elekana	def.	Tristan Overvig	Decision (unanimous) (30–27, 30–27, 30–27)	3	5:00
Light Heavyweight	Roland Dunlap	def.	Montè Morrison	Decision (unanimous) (29–27, 29–27, 29–27)	3	5:00

==== Contract awards ====
The following fighters were awarded contracts with the PFL:

- Impa Kasanganay

=== Week 8 - March 17 ===
PFL Challenger Series 16
- Promotion: PFL Challenger Series
- Date: March 17, 2023
- Venue: Universal Studios Florida
- City: Orlando, Florida, United States

Main Card (FuboTV)
Weight class				Method	Round	Time	Notes
Lightweight	Kendly St. Louis	def.	Paulo Henrique	Decision (unanimous) (30–27, 30–27, 30–27)	3	5:00
Women's Featherweight	Evelyn Martins	def.	Jackie Cataline	Decision (unanimous) (29–28, 29–28, 29–28)	3	5:00
Heavyweight	Denzel Freeman	def.	Raiden Kovacs	TKO (head kick and punches)	1	0:27
Welterweight	Ali Omar	def.	Sanon Sadeck	Decision (split) (29–28, 28–29, 30–27)	3	5:09

==== Contract awards ====
The following fighters were awarded contracts with the PFL:

- Denzel Freeman

== See also ==
- List of PFL events
- List of current PFL fighters
