= UFC Fight Night: Tsarukyan vs. Hooker =

Mixed martial arts event in 2025

- The poster for UFC Fight Night: Tsarukyan vs. Hooker
- Promotion: Ultimate Fighting Championship
- Date: November 22, 2025
- Venue: Ali Bin Hamad al-Attiyah Arena
- City: Al Rayyan, Qatar
- Attendance: Not announced

Event chronology
UFC 322: Della Maddalena vs. Makhachev	UFC Fight Night: Tsarukyan vs. Hooker	UFC 323: Dvalishvili vs. Yan 2

UFC Fight Night: Tsarukyan vs. Hooker (also known as UFC Fight Night 265) was a mixed martial arts event produced by the Ultimate Fighting Championship that took place on November 22, 2025, at the Ali Bin Hamad al-Attiyah Arena in Al Rayyan, Qatar.

== Background ==
This event marked the promotion's debut in Qatar, which became the third country in the Middle East to host it, after the United Arab Emirates and Saudi Arabia. There were initially rumors that the first event in the country would take place on May 17 at UFC Fight Night: Burns vs. Morales, but that card was moved to the UFC Apex in Las Vegas for unknown reasons.

The event headliner featured a lightweight bout between Arman Tsarukyan and Dan Hooker.

A heavyweight bout between Serghei Spivac and Shamil Gaziev was scheduled for this event. The pairing was originally scheduled for UFC Fight Night: Burns vs. Morales, then shifted to UFC 316. However, Gaziev withdrew from that event due to a broken finger sustained during training. In turn, Spivac withdrew from the bout for unknown reasons and was replaced by former LFA Heavyweight Champion Waldo Cortes-Acosta.

A middleweight bout between former UFC Middleweight Championship challenger Paulo Costa and Sharabutdin Magomedov was expected to take place at this event. However, Magomedov withdrew due to undergoing nose surgery, and the bout was removed from the card.

A heavyweight bout between promotional newcomers Marek Bujło and José Luiz was initially scheduled for the event. However, Luiz was later replaced for undisclosed reasons by current LFA Heavyweight Champion Denzel Freeman, who also made his promotional debut.

A flyweight bout between former UFC Flyweight Championship challenger Kyoji Horiguchi (who is also a former one-time RIZIN flyweight and two-time bantamweight champion, as well as a former Bellator bantamweight world champion) and Tagir Ulanbekov took place at this event. The pairing was initially expected to meet at UFC on ABC: Hill vs. Rountree Jr. in June, but Horiguchi withdrew for undisclosed reasons.

A light heavyweight bout between former KSW and UFC Light Heavyweight Champion Jan Błachowicz and Bogdan Guskov was scheduled for this event. However, the pairing was moved to UFC 323 for unknown reasons.

A featherweight bout between Muhammad Naimov and The Ultimate Fighter: Team Grasso vs. Team Shevchenko featherweight winner Mairon Santos was originally scheduled for this event. However, for undisclosed reasons, the matchup was rescheduled to take place two weeks later at UFC 323.

A bantamweight bout between Felipe Lima and Daniel Marcos was scheduled for this event. However, Lima withdrew for undisclosed reasons, and Marcos was instead rescheduled to face a new opponent two weeks earlier at UFC Fight Night: Bonfim vs. Brown.

== Results ==
Main card (ESPN+)
Weight class				Method	Round	Time	Notes
Lightweight	Arman Tsarukyan	def.	Dan Hooker	Submission (arm-triangle choke)	2	3:34
Welterweight	Ian Machado Garry	def.	Belal Muhammad	Decision (unanimous) (30–27, 30–27, 29–28)	3	5:00
Light Heavyweight	Volkan Oezdemir	def.	Alonzo Menifield	KO (knee and punches)	1	1:27
Welterweight	Myktybek Orolbai	def.	Jack Hermansson	KO (punch)	1	2:46
Heavyweight	Waldo Cortes-Acosta	def.	Shamil Gaziev	KO (punch)	1	1:22
Flyweight	Kyoji Horiguchi	def.	Tagir Ulanbekov	Technical Submission (rear-naked choke)	3	2:18
Preliminary card (ESPN+)
Featherweight	Luke Riley	def.	Bogdan Grad	KO (punches)	2	0:30
Welterweight	Nicolas Dalby	def.	Saygid Izagakhmaev	Decision (split) (29–28, 28–29, 29–28)	3	5:00
Flyweight	Asu Almabayev	def.	Alex Perez	Submission (guillotine choke)	3	0:22
Light Heavyweight	Abdul-Rakhman Yakhyaev	def.	Rafael Cerqueira	Submission (rear-naked choke)	1	0:33
Bantamweight	Aleksandre Topuria	def.	Bekzat Almakhan	Decision (unanimous) (30–27, 30–27, 29–28)	3	5:00
Middleweight	Ismail Naurdiev	def.	Ryan Loder	KO (punch)	1	1:26
Lightweight	Nurullo Aliev	def.	Shaqueme Rock	Decision (unanimous) (30–27, 30–27, 30–27)	3	5:00
Heavyweight	Denzel Freeman	def.	Marek Bujło	Decision (unanimous) (30–27, 29–28, 29–28)	3	5:00

== Bonus awards ==
The following fighters received $50,000 bonuses.

- Fight of the Night: No bonus awarded.
- Performance of the Night: Arman Tsarukyan, Waldo Cortes-Acosta, Kyoji Horiguchi, and Luke Riley

== See also ==
- 2025 in UFC
- List of current UFC fighters
- List of UFC events
