= Brando Peričić =

Australian mixed martial artist (born 1994)

- Born: August 3, 1994 (age 32); Semaphore, South Australia, Australia
- Other names: The Balkan Bear
- Height: 6 ft 5 in (196 cm)
- Weight: 265 lb (120 kg; 18 st 13 lb)
- Division: Heavyweight
- Reach: 79.5 in (202 cm)
- Fighting out of: Adelaide, Australia
- Team: City Kickboxing
- Years active: 2018–present (MMA)

Mixed martial arts record
- Total: 8
- Wins: 7
- By knockout: 6
- By submission: 1
- Losses: 1
- By submission: 1

Other information
- Mixed martial arts record from Sherdog

Brando Peričić (born August 3, 1994) is an Australian professional mixed martial artist. He competes in the heavyweight division of the Ultimate Fighting Championship (UFC). As of October 3, 2026, he is #13 in the Meta UFC heavyweight rankings.

== Early life ==
Peričić was born on August 3, 1994, in Semaphore, South Australia, to Croatian parents. As a fighter, he has received the nickname "The Balkan Bear" (Croatian: Balkanski Medvjed) due to his ancestry. He grew up in Adelaide, where he attended St Michael's College. Peričić competed in Australian rules football and rugby union before a hand injury stopped his career. Prior to becoming a fighter, he worked in construction security and debt collection.

== Mixed martial arts career ==
Peričić became interested in mixed martial arts (MMA) as his mother was trained in the sport by Sifu Jo Ip, considered an Adelaide martial arts "pioneer". He only began concentrating on the sport in his mid-20s. In 2018, Peričić battled cancer and nearly required an amputation of his arm, but recovered.

Peričić began his MMA career as an amateur, winning his first two fights under the Diamondback Fighting Championship (DFC) promotion in 2018, both by knockout in the first round. He had his first professional fight in 2019 with the DFC, defeating Ricky Biechun by technical knockout (TKO) in the first round on November 3, 2019. He then went five years before his next professional fight. UFC.com noted that, "in one remarkable run, five booked matchups fell through due to injury, opponent withdrawals, and the global pandemic".

Peričić, due to difficulty securing further MMA fights, began kickboxing professionally. In 2022, he moved to Auckland, New Zealand, to become a member of the club City Kickboxing. He lived in a van by the gym and kept "a gruelling training schedule of up to six hours a day [while using] the gym's facilities to wash and cook", according to The Advertiser. At City Kickboxing, he became friends with Ultimate Fighting Championship (UFC) fighter Israel Adesanya. Adesanya later had Peričić help him train for a fight against Alex Pereira.

Peričić made his return to professional MMA in 2024, defeating Kelvin Fitial on April 20, 2024, by submission, under the Shuriken Fight Series promotion. After a loss by submission to Randall Rayment with the Hex Fight Series on May 4, 2024, Peričić won his last two fights of the year with first-round TKOs, the first being in the Stealth Fighters League and the second in the Supremacy Fighting Championship. He signed an Ultimate Fighting Championship contract in August 2025 and then made his promotional debut the following month. Facing off against Elisha Ellison at UFC Fight Night 260, Peričić won by knockout within the first two minutes and earned a $50,000 bonus for having the Performance of the Night.

At UFC Fight Night 270, on March 21, 2026, Peričić made his second UFC appearance, defeating Louie Sutherland by TKO 1 minute, 48 seconds into the fight. He later faced off against Shamil Gaziev on May 2, 2026, at UFC Fight Night 275, winning with a second-round knockout while receiving a $100,000 bonus for the Fight of the Night. After his win, he entered the top 15 of the UFC heavyweight rankings.

== Championships and accomplishments ==
- Ultimate Fighting Championship
  - Fight of the Night (One time) vs. Shamil Gaziev
- Hex Fight Series
  - Hex Fight Series Heavyweight Champion (One time)

== Mixed martial arts record ==
Professional record breakdown
8 matches	7 wins	1 loss
By knockout	6	0
By submission	1	1

Res.	Record	Opponent	Method	Event	Date	Round	Time	Location	Notes
Win	7–1	Shamil Gaziev	KO (punch)	UFC Fight Night: Della Maddalena vs. Prates	May 2, 2026	2	3:44	Perth, Australia	Fight of the Night.
Win	6–1	Louie Sutherland	TKO (punches)	UFC Fight Night: Evloev vs. Murphy	March 21, 2026	1	1:48	London, England	
Win	5–1	Elisha Ellison	KO (punches)	UFC Fight Night: Ulberg vs. Reyes	September 27, 2025	1	1:55	Perth, Australia	Performance of the Night.
Win	4–1	Orion Kenny	TKO (punches)	Supremacy FC 12	November 2, 2024	1	1:08	Hamilton, New Zealand	
Win	3–1	Tumanako Phillips	TKO (punches)	Stealth Fighters League 1	October 25, 2024	1	0:17	Auckland, New Zealand	
Loss	2–1	Randall Rayment	Submission (rear-naked choke)	Hex Fight Series 30	May 4, 2024	2	1:36	Auckland, New Zealand	For the Hex Heavyweight Championship.
Win	2–0	Kelvin Fitial	Submission (rear-naked choke)	Shuriken Fight Series 17	April 20, 2024	1	3:26	Auckland, New Zealand	
Win	1–0	Ricky Biechun	TKO (punches and knees)	Diamondback FC 9	November 3, 2019	1	N/A	Adelaide, Australia	Heavyweight debut.
