= Colby Thicknesse =

Australian mixed martial artist (born 1999)

- Born: June 23, 1999 (age 27); Wollongong, New South Wales, Australia
- Other names: Slickness
- Height: 5 ft 7 in (1.70 m)
- Weight: 135 lb (61 kg; 9 st 9 lb)
- Division: Bantamweight; Featherweight
- Reach: 69 in (175 cm)
- Fighting out of: Windang, New South Wales, Australia
- Team: Freestyle Fighting Gym
- Years active: 2020–present

Mixed martial arts record
- Total: 11
- Wins: 10
- By knockout: 2
- By submission: 2
- By decision: 6
- Losses: 1
- By decision: 1

Other information
- Mixed martial arts record from Sherdog

Colby Thicknesse (born June 23, 1999) is a Australian mixed martial artist. He currently competes in the Bantamweight division of the Ultimate Fighting Championship (UFC).

== Background ==
Thicknesse was born in Wollongong, New South Wales, Australia. Thicknesse started amateur wrestling when he was 6 with his twin brother, before starting MMA at the age of 12, where he started training with now long-time friend and training partner, Alexander Volkanovski.

== Mixed martial arts career ==
=== Early career ===
Thicknesse turned professional career in 2020 at regional promotions and amassed an undefeated record at 7–0 before he signed with the Ultimate Fighting Championship.

=== Ultimate Fighting Championship ===
Replacing Cody Haddon, who withdrew due to injury, Thicknesse made his UFC debut against Aleksandre Topuria on February 9, 2025, at UFC 312. He lost the fight via unanimous decision.

Thicknesse faced Josias Musasa on September 28, 2026, at UFC Fight Night 260. He won the fight via unanimous decision.

Thicknesse faced Vince Morales on May 2, 2026 at UFC Fight Night 275. He won the fight via unanimous decision.

Thicknesse faced Asaf Chopurov on October 24, 2026, at UFC 333. He won the fight by split decision. 9 out of 10 media outlets scored the bout for Chopurov.

== Championships and accomplishments ==
- Hex Fight Series
  - Hex Bantamweight Championship (One time)

== Mixed martial arts record ==
Professional record breakdown
11 matches	10 wins	1 loss
By knockout	2	0
By submission	2	0
By decision	6	1

Res.	Record	Opponent	Method	Event	Date	Round	Time	Location	Notes
Win	10–1	Asaf Chopurov	Decision (split)	UFC 333	October 24, 2026	3	5:00	Abu Dhabi, United Arab Emirates	
Win	9–1	Vince Morales	Decision (unanimous)	UFC Fight Night: Della Maddalena vs. Prates	May 2, 2026	3	5:00	Perth, Australia	
Win	8–1	Josias Musasa	Decision (unanimous)	UFC Fight Night: Ulberg vs. Reyes	September 28, 2025	3	5:00	Perth, Australia	
Loss	7–1	Aleksandre Topuria	Decision (unanimous)	UFC 312	February 9, 2025	3	5:00	Sydney, Australia	
Win	7–0	Marvin Malunes	KO (elbows)	Hex Fight Series 33	November 23, 2024	1	N/A	Melbourne, Australia	Won the vacant Hex Bantamweight Championship.
Win	6–0	Norman Agcorpra	Submission (rear-naked choke)	Canggu Fight Night 32	October 27, 2024	1	2:38	Bali, Indonesia	
Win	5–0	Jufri Gobel	TKO (punches)	Canggu Fight Night 31	July 21, 2024	1	1:50	Bali, Indonesia	Featherweight bout.
Win	4–0	Michael Mannu	Decision (unanimous)	Hex Fight Series 29	March 2, 2024	3	5:00	Kensington, Australia	
Win	3–0	Michael Barber	Decision (unanimous)	Hex Fight Series 25	February 23, 2024	3	5:00	Melbourne, Australia	Return to Bantamweight.
Win	2–0	Semakadde Kakembo	Decision (unanimous)	Eternal MMA 70	September 17, 2022	3	5:00	Gold Coast, Australia	Featherweight debut.
Win	1–0	Shaun Johnson	Submission (rear-naked choke)	Eternal MMA 55	November 21, 2020	1	4:54	Gold Coast, Australia	Bantamweight debut.

== See also ==
- List of current UFC fighters
- List of male mixed martial artists
