= UFC 312 =

Mixed martial arts event in 2025

UFC 312: du Plessis vs. Strickland 2
- The poster for UFC 312: du Plessis vs. Strickland 2
- Promotion: Ultimate Fighting Championship
- Date: February 9, 2025
- Venue: Qudos Bank Arena
- City: Sydney, Australia
- Attendance: 18,537
- Total gate: $7,687,317
- Buyrate: 176,000

Event chronology
UFC Fight Night: Adesanya vs. Imavov	UFC 312: du Plessis vs. Strickland 2	UFC Fight Night: Cannonier vs. Rodrigues

UFC 312: du Plessis vs. Strickland 2 was a mixed martial arts event produced by the Ultimate Fighting Championship that took place on February 9, 2025, at the Qudos Bank Arena in Sydney, Australia.

== Background ==
The event marked the promotion's seventh visit to Sydney and first since UFC 293 in September 2023.

A UFC Middleweight Championship rematch between current champion Dricus du Plessis (also former KSW Welterweight Champion) and former champion Sean Strickland headlined the event. The pairing previously met one year prior at UFC 297 in which du Plessis captured the title by split decision.

A UFC Women's Strawweight Championship bout between current two-time champion Zhang Weili and The Ultimate Fighter: Team Joanna vs. Team Cláudia strawweight winner Tatiana Suarez served as the co-main event.

A light heavyweight bout between Jimmy Crute and Marcin Prachnio was scheduled for this event. However, Prachnio withdrew from the fight for unknown reasons and was replaced by former LFA Light Heavyweight Champion Rodolfo Bellato.

Road to UFC Season 2 flyweight winner Rei Tsuruya and Stewart Nicoll were scheduled to meet in a flyweight bout. However, Nicoll was forced to withdraw due to an injury and the bout was cancelled.

A bantamweight bout between promotional newcomer Aleksandre Topuria and Cody Haddon was scheduled for this event. However, Haddon withdrew from the fight due to a foot injury and was replaced by fellow newcomer Colby Thicknesse.

A flyweight bout between Road to UFC Season 1 flyweight winner Park Hyun-sung and Nyamjargal Tumendemberel was scheduled for the event. However, the bout was canceled due to a weight management issue with Nyamjargal.

During the event's broadcast, it was announced that the interim UFC Middleweight Championship bout that took place in April 2019 at UFC 236 between Israel Adesanya (who would go on to become a two-time middleweight champion) and The Ultimate Fighter: Team Jones vs. Team Sonnen middleweight winner Kelvin Gastelum would be the next "fight wing" UFC Hall of Fame inductee during International Fight Week festivities in Las Vegas this summer. Adesanya won the interim title via unanimous decision after a back-and-forth contest.

== Results ==
Main card
Weight class				Method	Round	Time	Notes
Middleweight	Dricus du Plessis (c)	def.	Sean Strickland	Decision (unanimous) (50–45, 50–45, 49–46)	5	5:00	(Note: For the UFC Middleweight Championship.)
Women's Strawweight	Zhang Weili (c)	def.	Tatiana Suarez	Decision (unanimous) (49–46, 49–46, 49–45)	5	5:00	(Note: For the UFC Women's Strawweight Championship.)
Heavyweight	Tallison Teixeira	def.	Justin Tafa	TKO (knee to the body and elbows)	1	0:35
Light Heavyweight	Jimmy Crute	vs.	Rodolfo Bellato	Draw (majority) (29–27, 28–28, 28–28)	3	5:00
Welterweight	Jake Matthews	def.	Francisco Prado	Decision (unanimous) (30–27, 30–27, 30–27)	3	5:00
Preliminary card (ESPN2 / Disney+ / ESPN+)
Featherweight	Gabriel Santos	def.	Jack Jenkins	Submission (rear-naked choke)	3	2:06
Lightweight	Tom Nolan	def.	Viacheslav Borshchev	Decision (unanimous) (29–28, 29–28, 30–27)	3	5:00
Women's Flyweight	Wang Cong	def.	Bruna Brasil	Decision (unanimous) (30–27, 30–27, 30–27)	3	5:00
Bantamweight	Aleksandre Topuria	def.	Colby Thicknesse	Decision (unanimous) (30–27, 30–27, 30–27)	3	5:00
Early Preliminary card (Disney+ / ESPN+ / UFC Fight Pass)
Lightweight	Rong Zhu	def.	Kody Steele	Decision (unanimous) (30–27, 30–27, 30–27)	3	5:00
Welterweight	Jonathan Micallef	def.	Kevin Jousset	Decision (unanimous) (29–28, 29–28, 29–28)	3	5:00
Lightweight	Quillan Salkilld	def.	Anshul Jubli	TKO (punch)	1	0:19

== Bonus awards ==
The following fighters received $50,000 bonuses.

- Fight of the Night: Rong Zhu vs. Kody Steele
- Performance of the Night: Tallison Teixeira and Quillan Salkilld

== See also ==
- 2025 in UFC
- List of current UFC fighters
- List of UFC events
- Mixed martial arts in Australia
