= UFC Fight Night: Della Maddalena vs. Prates =

Mixed martial arts event in 2026

- The poster for UFC Fight Night: Della Maddalena vs. Prates
- Promotion: Ultimate Fighting Championship
- Date: 2 May 2026
- Venue: RAC Arena
- City: Perth, Australia
- Attendance: 13,839
- Total gate: $3,074,696

Event chronology
UFC Fight Night: Sterling vs. Zalal	UFC Fight Night: Della Maddalena vs. Prates	UFC 328: Chimaev vs. Strickland

UFC Fight Night: Della Maddalena vs. Prates (also known as UFC Fight Night 275) was a mixed martial arts event produced by the Ultimate Fighting Championship that took place on 2 May 2026, at the RAC Arena in Perth, Australia.

== Background ==
This event marks the promotion's fifth visit to Perth and first since UFC Fight Night: Ulberg vs. Reyes in September 2025.

A welterweight bout between former UFC Welterweight Champion Jack Della Maddalena and Carlos Prates headlined the event.

A heavyweight bout between Tai Tuivasa and Sean Sharaf was scheduled for the event. However, Sharaf had to withdraw due to a broken nose and was replaced by Louie Sutherland.

A featherweight bout between Jack Jenkins and undefeated prospect Marwan Rahiki was scheduled for the event. However, Jenkins had to withdraw due to an injury and was replaced by promotional newcomer Ollie Schmid.

At the weigh-ins, Gerald Meerschaert weighed in at 190 pounds, 4 pounds over the middleweight non-title fight limit. His bout proceeded at catchweight and he was fined 30 percent of his purse, which went to his opponent Jacob Malkoun.

== Results ==
Main card (Paramount+)
Weight class				Method	Round	Time	Notes
Welterweight	Carlos Prates	def.	Jack Della Maddalena	TKO (leg kicks and elbows)	3	3:17
Lightweight	Quillan Salkilld	def.	Beneil Dariush	TKO (punches)	1	3:29
Flyweight	Steve Erceg	def.	Tim Elliott	Decision (unanimous) (29–28, 29–28, 29–28)	3	5:00
Featherweight	Marwan Rahiki	def.	Ollie Schmid	TKO (punches)	1	2:47
Heavyweight	Brando Peričić	def.	Shamil Gaziev	KO (punch)	2	3:44
Heavyweight	Louie Sutherland	def.	Tai Tuivasa	Decision (unanimous) (30–26, 30–26, 30–26)	3	5:00	(Note: Tuivasa was deducted one point in round 3 due to an illegal knee to the head.)
Preliminary card (Paramount+)
Middleweight	Cameron Rowston	def.	Robert Bryczek	Decision (unanimous) (30–27, 30–27, 30–27)	3	5:00
Light Heavyweight	Junior Tafa	def.	Kevin Christian	KO (punches and elbows)	1	2:42
Catchweight (190 lb)	Jacob Malkoun	def.	Gerald Meerschaert	Decision (unanimous) (29–28, 29–28, 29–28)	3	5:00
Bantamweight	Colby Thicknesse	def.	Vince Morales	Decision (unanimous) (29–28, 29–28, 29–28)	3	5:00
Middleweight	Wesley Schultz	def.	Ben Johnston	Submission (guillotine choke)	3	1:50
Welterweight	Jonathan Micallef	def.	Themba Gorimbo	Decision (split) (28–29, 29–28, 29–28)	3	5:00
Lightweight	Kody Steele	def.	Dom Mar Fan	Submission (inverted heel hook)	1	3:56

== Bonus awards ==
The following fighters received $100,000 bonuses. The other finishes received $25,000 additional bonuses.

- Fight of the Night: Brando Peričić vs. Shamil Gaziev
- Performance of the Night: Carlos Prates and Quillan Salkilld

== See also ==
- 2026 in UFC
- List of current UFC fighters
- List of UFC events
- Mixed Martial Arts in Australia
