= Julia Dorny =

German mixed martial arts fighter

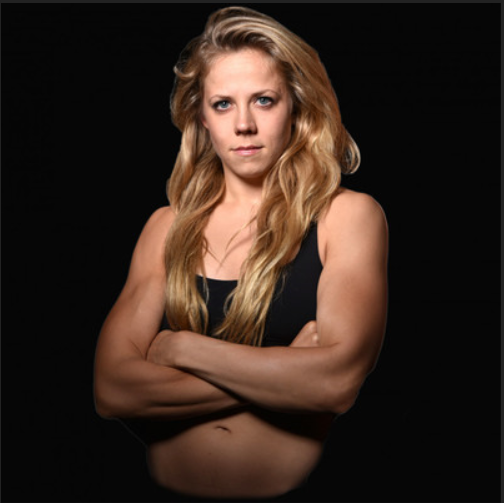
- Born: 20 February 1990 (age 36); Berlin
- Mixed martial arts career Martial arts career
- Height: 1.78 m (5 ft 10 in)
- Weight: 65.8 kg (145 lb; 10 st 5 lb)
- Division: Featherweight
- Style: Judo, Sumo, Kick-Boxing, Brazilian Jiu-Jitsu

Mixed martial arts record
- Total: 4
- Wins: 2
- By knockout: 2
- Losses: 2
- By knockout: 1
- By submission: 1

Amateur record
- Total: 15
- Wins: 10
- By knockout: 2
- By submission: 3
- Losses: 5

Other information
- Website: juliadorny.com

Julia Dorny (born 20 February 1990), is a German athlete, media scientist, journalist and television presenter who has won various World and European Championships in three martial arts disciplines. She is the only female athlete in the world who has won championships in judo, mixed martial arts and sumo wrestling. She was the first German woman to become MMA European Champion and MMA World Champion in featherweight within the IMMAF amateurs. In her professional career she was an undefeated fighter until her first loss in March 2022. She fought for the German Mixed Martial Arts Championship (GMC) and was under contract with PFL. In May 2023, she signed a multiple fight contract in the women's league Invicta FC. Julia Dorny holds a black belt (1st Dan) in three sports and a BJJ purple belt.

== Sports career (beginnings, judo and sumo career) ==
At the age of 7 Dorny began to be enthusiastic about judo. Since the age of 14 she has been fighting in the German Judo League. At the age of 17 she fought for the first time in the inaugural Judo Bundesliga (PSV Rostock). At 18, she was awarded her black belt in judo. Dorny is a multiple-time Berlin judo champion. She was German vice-champion in the individual classification, several times winner of the national ranking tournament and has countless international successes to her credit. In 2005 she qualified for the European Judo Championship, but was unable to compete due to injury. Dorny was a cadre athlete at the Olympic Training Center Berlin as well as in the German Judo Federation (DJB). Dorny was a student at the Werner-Seelenbinder-Sportschule, today's Schul- und Leistungssportzentrum Berlin (SLZB). With her former first division club JC Wiesbaden, she won bronze at the team championships. She is currently under contract for first division club JC 71 Düsseldorf.

=== Sumo career ===
In 2016 Dorny began sumo training and later that year she became German champion, won bronze at the European Championships, and took 5th place at the World Championships. In 2017 she received a shodan (1st dan) ranking in sumo wrestling. In her sumo career, Dorny became a multiple-time German champion (individual and open weight), secured 5th place at the 2017 World Games, and won silver at the 2019 US Open in Los Angeles.

== MMA career ==
Dorny won her MMA debut as an amateur at the German Championships (GEMMAF) 2015. In the same year she was nominated for the IMMAF World Championship in Las Vegas – winning bronze at her international debut. She then proved to be a consistent performer by winning another bronze medal at the IMMAF European Championship in Birmingham. In the following years, she participated in the IMMAF European (2016 runner-up European Champion) and IMMAF World Championships (2016 runner-up World Champion, 2017 bronze). In 2018 she took her performance to the next level and managed to become European and World Champion on her first attempt. This rare feat made her the first German European champion and the first German World Champion in the featherweight division.

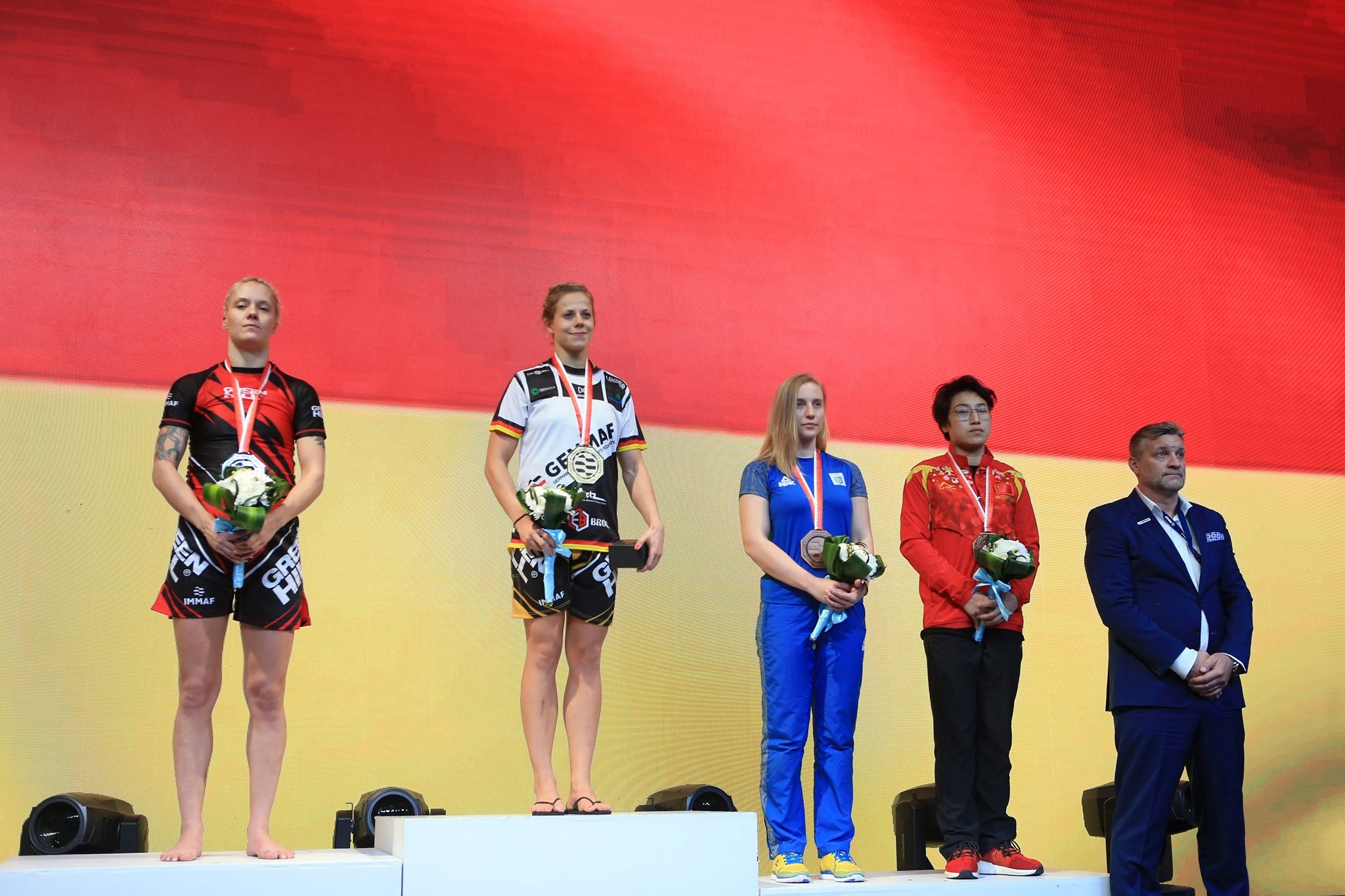
Julia Dorny winning MMA world-championship

=== German Mixed Martial Arts Championship (GMC) ===
After winning the European and World Championships, Dorny made her professional debut in front of her home crowd on 29 June 2019 at GMC20 in Berlin against Miriam Santana Ramos. She defeated Ramos in the first round by TKO (ground and pound). This fight was also the first GMC women's fight broadcast on FreeTV. She had her second fight at GMC22 on 12 October 2019 against Mariam Tatunashvili, which she also won through TKO (ground and pound) in the second round.

== Scientific and journalistic achievements ==
In addition to her sports career, Dorny works as presenter, and on-air reporter, media scientist, and speaker for Deutsche Welle TV (DW) and N-tv. Dorny completed her journalistic training at DW, German public, state-owned international broadcaster.

She graduated with a bachelor's degree in journalism and corporate communications in 2013. In 2017 she completed her master's degree in media studies at the Humboldt University of Berlin, majoring in the topic of "Framing in Journalism".

Since January 2020 Dorny has been running her own podcast, "WOMEN HIT HARDER – The Female Power Podcast by MMA World Champion Julia Dorny" and regularly releases new episodes. Among her previous guests are actor Jürgen Vogel, boxer Axel Schulz, boxing world champion Regina Halmich and chief editor of ICON Inga Griese such as actor Ken Duken, marathon twins Anna und Lisa Hahner and Olympic champions like Kevin Kuske, Matthias Steiner and Eric Franke.

In April 2020 she was appointed to the "Athletes' Commission" of the IMMAF.

== Mixed martial arts achievements ==
- IMMAF World Champion
- IMMAF European Champion

== Mixed martial arts record ==
Professional record breakdown
5 matches	2 wins	3 losses
By knockout	2	1
By submission	0	2

Res.	Record	Opponent	Method	Event	Date	Round	Time	Location	Notes
Loss	2–3	Joy Pendell	Submission (rear-naked choke)	Invicta FC 60	February 7, 2025	2	4:46	Atlanta, Georgia, United States	
Loss	2–2	Riley Martinez	Submission (rear-naked choke)	Invicta FC 54	October 27, 2023	1	1:48	Boston, Massachusetts, United States	Return to Featherweight.
Loss	2–1	Jeslen Mishelle	TKO (punches)	PFL Challenger Series 3	March 4, 2022	1	3:51	Orlando, Florida, United States	Lightweight debut.
Win	2–0	Mariam Tatunashvili	TKO (punches)	GMC 22	October 12, 2019	2	2:21	Hamburg, Germany	
Win	1–0	Miriam Santana	TKO (punches)	GMC 20	June 29, 2019	1	3:04	Berlin, Germany	Featherweight debut.

=== Amateur mixed martial arts record ===
Amateur record breakdown		
15 matches	10 wins	5 losses
By knockout	1	1
By submission	3	1
By decision	6	3

Res.	Record	Opponent	Method	Event	Date	Round	Time	Location	Notes
Win	10–5	Paulina Kosakowska	TKO (punches)	Cage FS 9	February 2, 2019	1	1:56	Graz, Austria	
Win	9–5	Jenni Kivioja	Submission (armbar)	2018 IMMAF-WMMAA Unified World Championships	November 17, 2018	2	2:09	Manama, Bahrain	Tournament Championship.
Win	8–5	Meng Chen	Submission (rear-naked choke)	2018 IMMAF-WMMAA Unified World Championships	November 15, 2018	2	2:01	Manama, Bahrain	
Win	7–5	Jenni Kivioja	Decision (unanimous)	2018 IMMAF European Championships	June 22, 2018	3	3:00	Bucharest, Romania	Tournament Championship.
Win	6–5	Anniina Ervasti	Decision (unanimous)	2018 IMMAF European Championships	June 21, 2018	3	3:00	Bucharest, Romania	Return to Featherweight.
Loss	5–5	Gase Sanita	Decision (split)	2017 IMMAF World Championships	November 16, 2017	3	3:00	Manama, Bahrain	
Win	5–4	Izabel Hristova	Decision (unanimous)	2017 IMMAF World Championships	November 15, 2017	3	3:00	Manama, Bahrain	Lightweight debut.
Loss	4–4	Joanne Doyle	Decision (split)	2016 IMMAF European Open Championships	November 26, 2016	3	3:00	Prague, Czech Republic	Tournament Championship.
Win	4–3	Iiris Nihti	Decision (unanimous)	2016 IMMAF European Open Championships	November 25, 2016	3	3:00	Prague, Czech Republic	
Loss	3–3	Leah McCourt	TKO (punches)	2016 IMMAF World Championships	July 10, 2016	1	1:54	Las Vegas, Nevada, United States	Tournament Championship.
Win	3–2	Fatime Nánási	Decision (unanimous)	2016 IMMAF World Championships	July 8, 2016	3	3:00	Las Vegas, Nevada, United States	
Win	2–2	Chamia Chabbi	Submission (armbar)	2016 IMMAF World Championships	July 7, 2016	1	0:33	Las Vegas, Nevada, United States	
Win	1–2	Malwina Golczak	Decision (unanimous)	MMA Meets Wild West	April 9, 2016	3	3:00	Templin, Germany	
Loss	0–2	Sanna Merta	Submission (armbar)	2015 IMMAF European Open Championships	November 21, 2015	3	1:58	Wolverhampton, England	
Loss	0–1	Jamie Herrington	Decision (unanimous)	IMMAF 2015 World Championships	July 9, 2015	3	3:00	Las Vegas, Nevada, United States	Featherweight debut.
