= UFC Fight Night: Moicano vs. Saint Denis =

Mixed martial arts event in 2024

- The poster for UFC Fight Night: Moicano vs. Saint Denis
- Promotion: Ultimate Fighting Championship
- Date: September 28, 2024
- Venue: Accor Arena
- City: Paris, France
- Attendance: 15,449
- Total gate: $4,000,000

Event chronology
UFC 306: O'Malley vs. Dvalishvili	UFC Fight Night: Moicano vs. Saint Denis	UFC 307: Pereira vs. Rountree Jr.

UFC Fight Night: Moicano vs. Saint Denis (also known as UFC Fight Night 243 and UFC on ESPN+ 101) was a mixed martial arts event produced by the Ultimate Fighting Championship that took place on September 28, 2024, at the Accor Arena in Paris, France.

== Background ==
The event marked the promotion's third visit to Paris and first since UFC Fight Night: Gane vs. Spivac in September 2023.

A lightweight bout between Renato Moicano and Benoît Saint Denis headlined this event.

A lightweight bout between Ľudovít Klein and Nikolas Motta was scheduled for this event. However, Motta withdrew for unknown reasons and was replaced by Roosevelt Roberts.

A featherweight bout between Morgan Charrière and AJ Cunningham was scheduled for this event. However, Cunninham withdrew from the fight due to an injury and was replaced by Gabriel Miranda.

A women's bantamweight bout between former UFC Women's Featherweight Champion Germaine de Randamie and Nora Cornolle was scheduled for this event. However, de Randamie withdrew from the fight due to a broken finger and a fractured foot which led her to be replaced by former LFA Women's Bantamweight Champion Jacqueline Cavalcanti.

A bantamweight bout between Taylor Lapilus and Felipe Lima was scheduled for this event. However, Lima withdrew from the fight for unknown reasons and was replaced by Vince Morales.

At the weigh-ins, Ailín Pérez weighed in at 136.5 pounds, half a pound over the bantamweight non-title fight limit. The bout proceeded at catchweight and Perez was fined 20 percent of her purse, which went to her opponent Darya Zheleznyakova.

== Results ==
Main card (ESPN+)
Weight class				Method	Round	Time	Notes
Lightweight	Renato Moicano	def.	Benoît Saint Denis	TKO (doctor stoppage)	2	5:00
Middleweight	Nassourdine Imavov	def.	Brendan Allen	Decision (unanimous) (29–28, 29–28, 29–28)	3	5:00
Featherweight	William Gomis	def.	Joanderson Brito	Decision (split) (29–28, 28–29, 29–28)	3	5:00
Welterweight	Bryan Battle	def.	Kevin Jousset	TKO (punches)	2	3:47
Featherweight	Morgan Charrière	def.	Gabriel Miranda	KO (punch)	2	0:27
Lightweight	Farès Ziam	def.	Matt Frevola	KO (knee)	3	2:59
Preliminary card (ESPN+)
Light Heavyweight	Ion Cuțelaba	def.	Ivan Erslan	Decision (split) (28–29, 29–28, 29–28)	3	5:00
Light Heavyweight	Oumar Sy	def.	Jung Da-woon	Decision (unanimous) (30–27, 30–27, 30–27)	3	5:00
Lightweight	Ľudovít Klein	def.	Roosevelt Roberts	Decision (unanimous) (30–27, 29–28, 29–28)	3	5:00
Bantamweight	Taylor Lapilus	def.	Vince Morales	Decision (unanimous) (30–27, 30–27, 30–27)	3	5:00
Catchweight (136.5 lb)	Ailín Pérez	def.	Darya Zheleznyakova	Submission (arm-triangle choke)	1	3:52
Flyweight	Daniel Bárez	def.	Victor Altamirano	Decision (unanimous) (29–28, 29–28, 29–28)	3	5:00
Women's Bantamweight	Jacqueline Cavalcanti	def.	Nora Cornolle	Decision (split) (28–29, 29–28, 29–28)	3	5:00
Lightweight	Chris Duncan	def.	Bolaji Oki	Technical Submission (guillotine choke)	1	3:34

== Bonus awards ==
The following fighters received $50,000 bonuses.

- Fight of the Night: No bonus awarded.
- Performance of the Night: Bryan Battle, Morgan Charriere, Farès Ziam, and Chris Duncan

== See also ==
- 2024 in UFC
- List of current UFC fighters
- List of UFC events
