= UFC Fight Night: Makhachev vs. Green =

UFC mixed martial arts event in 2022

- The poster for UFC Fight Night: Makhachev vs. Green
- Promotion: Ultimate Fighting Championship
- Date: February 26, 2022
- Venue: UFC Apex
- City: Enterprise, Nevada, United States
- Attendance: Not announced

Event chronology
| UFC Fight Night: Walker vs. Hill | UFC Fight Night: Makhachev vs. Green | UFC 272: Covington vs. Masvidal |

UFC Fight Night: Makhachev vs. Green (also known as UFC Fight Night 202, UFC on ESPN+ 60 and UFC Vegas 49) was a mixed martial arts event produced by the Ultimate Fighting Championship that took place on February 26, 2022 at the UFC Apex facility in Enterprise, Nevada, part of the Las Vegas Metropolitan Area, United States.

== Background ==
A lightweight bout between Islam Makhachev and Beneil Dariush was expected to serve as the event headliner. However on February 16, it was reported that Dariush withdrew from the event due to an ankle injury and was replaced by King Green on just 10 days notice at a catchweight of 160 pounds.

A lightweight bout between Farès Ziam and Terrance McKinney took place at the event. The pair was previously booked for UFC Fight Night: Vieira vs. Tate in last November, but it was scrapped a few hours before taking place due to one of McKinney's cornermen testing positive for COVID-19.

A heavyweight bout between Jairzinho Rozenstruik and Marcin Tybura was scheduled for the event. However in mid-January, the bout was moved to UFC 273.

A women's bantamweight bout between Wu Yanan and Josiane Nunes was scheduled for the event. However, Wu was pulled from the fight for undisclosed reasons and she was replaced by promotional newcomer Jennifer Gonzalez. In turn, Gonzalez was released from UFC one week ahead of the event for undisclosed reasons (later revealed to be related to an USADA incident). She was replaced by promotional newcomer Ramona Pascual.

Makhmud Muradov was expected to face Misha Cirkunov in a middleweight bout at the event. However, Muradov pulled out in late January due to a hand injury and was replaced by Wellington Turman.

A light heavyweight bout between Ryan Spann and Ion Cuțelaba was expected to take place at the event. However in early February, Spann was injured and the bout was rescheduled for UFC Fight Night 209.

Jonny Parsons and Michael Gillmore were expected to meet in a welterweight bout at the event. However, Parsons withdrew for unknown reasons and was replaced by Ramiz Brahimaj.

A women's strawweight bout was scheduled to take place at the event between Hannah Goldy and former Invicta FC Atomweight Champion Jinh Yu Frey. However on February 23, Goldy withdrew due to illness and the bout was scrapped.

At the weigh-ins, Rong Zhu weighed in at 160 pounds, four pounds over the lightweight non-title fight limit. His bout proceeded at a catchweight and he was fined 40% of his purse, which went to his opponent Ignacio Bahamondes.

== Results ==
Main card (ESPN+)
| Weight class | | | | Method | Round | Time | Notes |
|---|---|---|---|---|---|---|---|
| Catchweight (160 lb) | Islam Makhachev | def. | King Green | TKO (punches) | 1 | 3:23 |
| Middleweight | Wellington Turman | def. | Misha Cirkunov | Submission (armbar) | 2 | 1:29 |
| Women's Flyweight | Priscila Cachoeira | def. | Ji Yeon Kim | Decision (unanimous) (29–28, 29–28, 29–28) | 3 | 5:00 |
| Lightweight | Arman Tsarukyan | def. | Joel Álvarez | TKO (punches) | 2 | 1:57 |
| Middleweight | Armen Petrosyan | def. | Gregory Rodrigues | Decision (split) (29–28, 28–29, 30–27) | 3 | 5:00 |
Preliminary card (ESPN+)
| Catchweight (160 lb) | Ignacio Bahamondes | def. | Rong Zhu | Submission (brabo choke) | 3 | 1:40 |
| Women's Featherweight | Josiane Nunes | def. | Ramona Pascual | Decision (unanimous) (30–27, 30–27, 30–26) | 3 | 5:00 |
| Lightweight | Terrance McKinney | def. | Farès Ziam | Submission (rear-naked choke) | 1 | 2:11 |
| Featherweight | Jonathan Martinez | def. | Alejandro Pérez | Decision (unanimous) (29–28, 29–28, 30–27) | 3 | 5:00 |
| Welterweight | Ramiz Brahimaj | def. | Micheal Gillmore | Submission (rear-naked choke) | 1 | 2:02 |
| Flyweight | Carlos Hernández | def. | Victor Altamirano | Decision (split) (28–29, 30–27, 29–28) | 3 | 5:00 |

== Bonus awards ==
The following fighters received $50,000 bonuses.

- Fight of the Night: Priscila Cachoeira vs. Ji Yeon Kim
- Performance of the Night: Wellington Turman and Arman Tsarukyan

== See also ==
- List of UFC events
- List of current UFC fighters
- 2022 in UFC
