= UFC on ESPN: Tybura vs. Spivac 2 =

Mixed martial arts event in 2024

- The poster for UFC on ESPN: Tybura vs. Spivac 2
- Promotion: Ultimate Fighting Championship
- Date: August 10, 2024
- Venue: UFC Apex
- City: Enterprise, Nevada, United States
- Attendance: Not announced

Event chronology
UFC on ABC: Sandhagen vs. Nurmagomedov	UFC on ESPN: Tybura vs. Spivac 2	UFC 305: du Plessis vs. Adesanya

UFC on ESPN: Tybura vs. Spivac 2 (also known as UFC on ESPN 61 and UFC Vegas 95) was a mixed martial arts event produced by the Ultimate Fighting Championship that took place on August 10, 2024, at the UFC Apex facility, in Enterprise, Nevada, part of the Las Vegas Metropolitan Area, United States.

== Background ==
A heavyweight rematch between Marcin Tybura and Serghei Spivac headlined the event. The pair previously met at UFC Fight Night: Benavidez vs. Figueiredo in February 2020, which Tybura won by unanimous decision.

A bantamweight bout between Javid Basharat and Chris Gutiérrez was expected to take place a week earlier at UFC on ABC: Sandhagen vs. Nurmagomedov, but it was moved to this event for unknown reasons. During fight week, Basharat withdrew due to an injury and was replaced by promotional newcomer Quang Le, who was originally scheduled to fight on Dana White's Contender Series in September.

A welterweight bout between Uroš Medić and Danny Barlow was expected to take place at this event. However, on July 11, Medić announced on social media that a rib injury has forced him to withdraw from the bout. Barlow faced promotional newcomer Nikolay Veretennikov instead.

Two fights originally scheduled for the event were cancelled a few days before taking place: a welterweight bout between Yusaku Kinoshita and Jonny Parsons, due to Parsons withdrawing for unknown reasons; and a flyweight bout between Allan Nascimento and Jafel Filho, due to Nascimento being ill.

At the weigh-ins, three fighters missed weight:

- Chepe Mariscal weighed in at 149.5 pounds, three and a half pounds over the featherweight non-title fight limit.
- Danny Barlow weighed in at 171.25 pounds, a quarter of a pound over the welterweight non-title fight limit.
- Chelsea Chandler weighed in at 141 pounds, five pounds over the bantamweight non-title fight limit.

All three bouts proceeded at catchweight. Each fighter was fined 20 percent of their individual purses which went to their opponents former LFA Featherweight Champion Damon Jackson, Nikolay Veretennikov, and former Invicta FC Bantamweight Champion and UFC Women's Featherweight Championship challenger Yana Santos respectively.

== Results ==
Main card (ESPN / ESPN+)
Weight class				Method	Round	Time	Notes
Heavyweight	Serghei Spivac	def.	Marcin Tybura	Submission (armbar)	1	1:44
Catchweight (149.5 lb)	Chepe Mariscal	def.	Damon Jackson	Decision (unanimous) (30–25, 30–25, 30–26)	3	5:00
Catchweight (171.25 lb)	Danny Barlow	def.	Nikolay Veretennikov	Decision (split) (29–28, 27–30, 29–28)	3	5:00
Bantamweight	Chris Gutiérrez	def.	Quang Le	Decision (unanimous) (29–28, 29–28, 29–28)	3	5:00
Catchweight (141 lb)	Yana Santos	def.	Chelsea Chandler	Decision (unanimous) (30–27, 29–28, 29–28)	3	5:00
Bantamweight	Toshiomi Kazama	def.	Charalampos Grigoriou	Submission (triangle choke)	2	1:55
Preliminary card (ESPN / ESPN+)
Women's Bantamweight	Karol Rosa	def.	Pannie Kianzad	Decision (unanimous) (30–27, 30–27, 30–27)	3	5:00
Heavyweight	Jhonata Diniz	def.	Karl Williams	Decision (unanimous) (30–27, 29–28, 29–28)	3	5:00
Featherweight	Youssef Zalal	def.	Jarno Errens	Submission (rear-naked choke)	1	3:52
Women's Strawweight	Stephanie Luciano	def.	Talita Alencar	Decision (unanimous) (30–27, 30–27, 30–27)	3	5:00

== Bonus awards ==
The following fighters received $50,000 bonuses.

- Fight of the Night: No bonus awarded.
- Performance of the Night: Serghei Spivac, Toshiomi Kazama, and Youssef Zalal

== See also ==
- 2024 in UFC
- List of current UFC fighters
- List of UFC events
