= UFC Fight Night: Ankalaev vs. Walker 2 =

2024 mixed martial event in Nevada, US

- The poster for UFC Fight Night: Ankalaev vs. Walker 2
- Promotion: Ultimate Fighting Championship
- Date: January 13, 2024
- Venue: UFC Apex
- City: Enterprise, Nevada, United States
- Attendance: Not announced

Event chronology
UFC 296: Edwards vs. Covington	UFC Fight Night: Ankalaev vs. Walker 2	UFC 297: Strickland vs. du Plessis

UFC Fight Night: Ankalaev vs. Walker 2 (also known as UFC Fight Night 234, UFC on ESPN+ 92 and UFC Vegas 84) was a mixed martial arts event produced by the Ultimate Fighting Championship that took place on January 13, 2024, at the UFC Apex facility, in Enterprise, Nevada, part of the Las Vegas Metropolitan Area, United States.

== Background ==
A light heavyweight rematch between former UFC Light Heavyweight Championship challenger Magomed Ankalaev and Johnny Walker headlined the event. The pairing originally met at UFC 294 which ended in a no contest when Ankalaev landed an illegal knee that rendered Walker unable to continue.

Former LFA Featherweight Champion Gabriel Santos and Westin Wilson were expected to meet in a featherweight bout. However, Santos pulled out due to undisclosed reasons and was replaced by promotional newcomer Jean Silva.

Bassil Hafez and Preston Parsons were scheduled to meet in a welterweight bout. However, Hafez pulled out due to undisclosed reasons and was replaced by Matthew Semelsberger.

A women's bantamweight bout between former Invicta FC Bantamweight Champion and UFC Women's Featherweight Championship challenger Yana Santos and Norma Dumont was expected to take place at the event. However, Santos pulled out due to a broken nose and the bout was scrapped.

A flyweight bout between former LFA Flyweight Champion Felipe Bunes and Denys Bondar was also scheduled for the preliminary portion of the event. However, Bondar pulled out in late December due to undisclosed reasons and was replaced by Joshua Van.

A women's bantamweight bout between Ketlen Vieira and The Ultimate Fighter: Heavy Hitters women's featherweight winner Macy Chiasson was expected to take place at the event. However, Vieira was pulled because of an injury and the bout was scrapped.

Former Rizin Bantamweight Champion Manel Kape was expected to face Matheus Nicolau in a flyweight rematch at the co-main event. The pairing previously met at UFC Fight Night: Edwards vs. Muhammad in March 2021, where Nicolau won the fight via controversial split decision. However at the weigh-ins, Kape weighed in at 129.5 pounds, three and a half pounds over the flyweight non-title fight limit. As a result, the bout was cancelled.

== Results ==
Main card (ESPN+)
Weight class				Method	Round	Time	Notes
Light Heavyweight	Magomed Ankalaev	def.	Johnny Walker	KO (punches)	2	2:42
Lightweight	Jim Miller	def.	Gabriel Benítez	Submission (face crank)	3	3:25
Bantamweight	Mario Bautista	def.	Ricky Simón	Decision (unanimous) (30–27, 30–27, 29–28)	3	5:00
Middleweight	Brunno Ferreira	def.	Phil Hawes	KO (punches)	1	4:55
Heavyweight	Waldo Cortes-Acosta	def.	Andrei Arlovski	Decision (unanimous) (29–28, 29–28, 29–28)	3	5:00
Preliminary card (ESPN+)
Welterweight	Preston Parsons	def.	Matthew Semelsberger	Decision (unanimous) (30–27, 30–27, 30–27)	3	5:00
Bantamweight	Marcus McGhee	def.	Gastón Bolaños	TKO (spinning wheel kick and punches)	3	3:29
Bantamweight	Farid Basharat	def.	Taylor Lapilus	Decision (unanimous) (30–27, 30–27, 30–27)	3	5:00
Featherweight	Jean Silva	def.	Westin Wilson	TKO (punches)	1	4:12
Lightweight	Nikolas Motta	def.	Tom Nolan	TKO (punches)	1	1:03
Flyweight	Joshua Van	def.	Felipe Bunes	TKO (punches)	2	4:31

== Bonus awards ==
The following fighters received $50,000 bonuses.

- Fight of the Night: No bonus awarded.
- Performance of the Night: Magomed Ankalaev, Jim Miller, Brunno Ferreira, and Marcus McGhee

== See also ==
- 2024 in UFC
- List of current UFC fighters
- List of UFC events
