= Jacqueline Cavalcanti =

Portuguese mixed martial artist (born 1997)

- Born: Jacqueline dos Santos Cavalcanti; August 29, 1997 (age 29); Pirituba, São Paulo, Brazil
- Other names: The Nightmare
- Height: 5 ft 8 in (173 cm)
- Division: Bantamweight
- Reach: 70 in (178 cm)
- Fighting out of: Almada, Portugal
- Team: Reborn Fight Team
- Years active: 2018–present

Mixed martial arts record
- Total: 12
- Wins: 10
- By knockout: 3
- By decision: 7
- Losses: 2
- By decision: 2

Other information
- Mixed martial arts record from Sherdog

Jacqueline dos Santos Cavalcanti (born August 29, 1997) is a Portuguese professional mixed martial artist who competes in the women's Bantamweight division of the Ultimate Fighting Championship (UFC). As of October 31, 2026, she is #6 in the Meta UFC women's bantamweight rankings.

== Mixed martial arts career ==
=== Early career ===
Cavalcanti made her professional MMA debut on June 2, 2018, facing Jackelin Casariego at Fight Company 5. She won that bout by TKO in the first round.

Cavalcanti faced Nora Cornolle on July 10, 2021, at FFAC - FFA Challenge 2. She won the bout by unanimous decision.

Cavalcanti faced Martina Jindrová on March 4, 2022, at PFL Challenger Series 3. She lost the bout by split decision.

In her last bout prior to being signed by the UFC, Cavalcanti fought Melissa Croden for the vacant LFA Women's Bantamweight Championship at LFA 157. She won the bout by unanimous decision to win the title.

=== Ultimate Fighting Championship ===
Cavalcanti faced Zarah Fairn on September 2, 2023, at UFC Fight Night 226, replacing Haily Cowan on the card. She won the fight via unanimous decision.

Cavalcanti faced Josiane Nunes on August 24, 2024 at UFC on ESPN 62. She won the fight by split decision.

Cavalcanti faced Nora Cornolle in a rematch on September 28, 2024 at UFC Fight Night 243, replacing Germaine de Randamie on the card. She won the bout by split decision.

Cavalcanti was scheduled to face Germaine de Randamie on January 11, 2025 at UFC Fight Night 249. However, de Randamie announced her retirement and the bout was scrapped.

Cavalcanti faced Julia Avila on February 15, 2025 at UFC Fight Night 251. She won the fight by unanimous decision.

Cavalcanti faced Mayra Bueno Silva on November 8, 2025, at UFC Fight Night 264. She won the fight by unanimous decision.

Cavalcanti faced Ketlen Vieira on May 16, 2026 at UFC Fight Night 276. She lost the fight by unanimous decision, marking the first defeat of her UFC career.

Cavalcanti was scheduled to face Michelle Montague on November 21, 2026 at UFC Fight Night 294. However, for undisclosed reasons, the pairing was postponed to UFC 335 which will take place on December 12, 2026.

== Championships and accomplishments ==
- Legacy Fighting Alliance
  - LFA Women's Bantamweight Championship (One time)
- Strikers Cage Championship
  - SCC Women's Bantamweight Championship (One time)

== Mixed martial arts record ==
Professional record breakdown
| 12 matches | 10 wins | 2 losses |
| By knockout | 3 | 0 |
| By decision | 7 | 2 |

| Res. | Record | Opponent | Method | Event | Date | Round | Time | Location | Notes |
|---|---|---|---|---|---|---|---|---|---|
| Loss | 10–2 | Ketlen Vieira | Decision (unanimous) | UFC Fight Night: Allen vs. Costa | May 16, 2026 | 3 | 5:00 | Las Vegas, Nevada, United States | |
| Win | 10–1 | Mayra Bueno Silva | Decision (unanimous) | UFC Fight Night: Bonfim vs. Brown | November 8, 2025 | 3 | 5:00 | Las Vegas, Nevada, United States | |
| Win | 9–1 | Julia Avila | Decision (unanimous) | UFC Fight Night: Cannonier vs. Rodrigues | February 15, 2025 | 3 | 5:00 | Las Vegas, Nevada, United States | |
| Win | 8–1 | Nora Cornolle | Decision (split) | UFC Fight Night: Moicano vs. Saint Denis | September 28, 2024 | 3 | 5:00 | Paris, France | |
| Win | 7–1 | Josiane Nunes | Decision (split) | UFC on ESPN: Cannonier vs. Borralho | August 24, 2024 | 3 | 5:00 | Las Vegas, Nevada, United States | |
| Win | 6–1 | Zarah Fairn | Decision (unanimous) | UFC Fight Night: Gane vs. Spivac | September 2, 2023 | 3 | 5:00 | Paris, France | Catchweight (140 lb) bout. |
| Win | 5–1 | Melissa Croden | Decision (unanimous) | LFA 157 | April 21, 2023 | 5 | 5:00 | Prior Lake, Minnesota, United States | Won the vacant LFA Women's Bantamweight Championship. |
| Win | 4–1 | Nadja Milijancevic | TKO (elbows) | Strikers Cage Championship 12 | November 26, 2022 | 2 | 4:00 | Santa Cruz de Tenerife, Spain | Bantamweight debut. Won vacant the SCC Women's Bantamweight Championship. |
| Win | 3–1 | Yulia Kutsenko | KO (knees and punches) | UAE Warriors 30 | July 2, 2022 | 1 | 3:07 | Abu Dhabi, United Arab Emirates | Featherweight bout. |
| Loss | 2–1 | Martina Jindrová | Decision (split) | PFL Challenger Series 3 | March 4, 2022 | 3 | 5:00 | Orlando, Florida, United States | Lightweight debut. |
| Win | 2–0 | Nora Cornolle | Decision (unanimous) | FFA Challenge 2 | July 10, 2021 | 3 | 5:00 | Paris, France | |
| Win | 1–0 | Jackelin Casariego | TKO (strikes) | Fight Company 5 | June 2, 2018 | 1 | 3:12 | Quarteira, Portugal | Featherweight debut. |

== See also ==
- List of current UFC fighters
- List of female mixed martial artists
