= Farès Ziam =

French mixed martial artist (born 1997)

- Born: March 21, 1997 (age 29); Vénissieux, Auvergne-Rhône-Alpes, France
- Other names: Smile Killer
- Height: 6 ft 0 in (183 cm)
- Weight: 155 lb (70 kg; 11 st 1 lb)
- Division: Lightweight (2016–present); Welterweight (2014–2016)
- Reach: 75 in (191 cm)
- Fighting out of: Lyon, France
- Team: Team Ezbiri (2014–2021); Sanford MMA (2021–present)
- Years active: 2014–present

Mixed martial arts record
- Total: 24
- Wins: 18
- By knockout: 7
- By submission: 4
- By decision: 7
- Losses: 6
- By knockout: 1
- By submission: 3
- By decision: 2

Other information
- Mixed martial arts record from Sherdog

Farès Ziam (born March 21, 1997) is a French professional mixed martial artist and kickboxer who competes in the Lightweight division of the Ultimate Fighting Championship (UFC).

== Background ==
Born into a Franco-Algerian family in 1997, he was a fan of mixed martial arts and Brazilian jiu-jitsu. It was a family affair, with everyone involved in combat sports. His father, Taïeb, who was a former pro boxer that hung up his gloves in the 2000s, has of course had something to do with it. His stepfather did Brazilian jiu-jitsu while his two brothers did Muay Thai. At 12, Ziam began practicing combat sports with full contact. At 13, he began doing Brazilian jiu-jitsu, kickboxing and MMA once or twice a week. Starting at 14, he did judo, BJJ and kickboxing for three years, he then joined the Ezbiri team in Villeurbanne to do MMA professionally.

== Kickboxing career ==
On June 13, 2015, Ziam defeated Tom Pedereno by technical knockout at Sanda Pro Fight Tour #1.

On October 13, 2015, Ziam faced Yazid Boussaha for the vacant ISKA K-1 European 72.5 kg title. He won the fight by unanimous decision.

On April 8, 2016, Ziam faced Igor Kozak at Fight Night ONE. He won the fight by second round doctor stoppage.

On October 28, 2017, Ziam made his Glory promotional debut at Glory 47 against Mohamed Souane. The fight was declared a draw after three rounds.

== Mixed martial arts career ==
=== Early career ===
Starting his professional MMA career in 2014, Ziam compiled a 10–2 record fighting mostly in the regional European scene, winning the HIT and LFC lightweight championships in the process.

=== Ultimate Fighting Championship ===
Ziam, as a replacement for Magomed Mustafaev, made his promotional debut against Don Madge on September 7, 2019, at UFC 242 in Abu Dhabi, United Arab Emirates. Ziam lost the fight by unanimous decision.

Ziam faced Jamie Mullarkey at UFC Fight Night 180 on October 18, 2020. He won the fight via unanimous decision.

Ziam faced Luigi Vendramini on June 12, 2021, at UFC 263. He won the fight via majority decision.

As the last fight of his prevailing contract, Ziam was scheduled to face Terrance McKinney on November 20, 2021, at UFC Fight Night 198. However, one of McKinney's cornermen got COVID-19 the day of the bout and it was scrapped. The pairing was rescheduled and eventually took place at UFC Fight Night 202 on February 26, 2022. Ziam lost the bout via first round rear-naked choke.

UFC opted not to renew his contract for a while, but eventually Ziam faced Michal Figlak on September 3, 2022, at UFC Fight Night 209 as the first bout of his new contract. He won the fight via unanimous decision.

Ziam faced Jai Herbert on July 22, 2023, at UFC Fight Night 224. He won the fight via unanimous decision.

Ziam faced Claudio Puelles on February 24, 2024, at UFC Fight Night 237. Despite being taken down seven times, Ziam won the bout by split decision after landing more strikes.

As the first bout of his new four-fight contract, Ziam faced Matt Frevola on September 28, 2024, at UFC Fight Night 243. He won the fight by knockout in the third round after delivering a knee to the face of his opponent. This fight earned him his first Performance of the Night award.

Ziam faced Mike Davis on February 1, 2025 at UFC Fight Night 250. He won the fight by unanimous decision.

Ziam was scheduled to face Kauê Fernandes on September 6, 2025, at UFC Fight Night 258. However, he withdrew from the bout for personal reasons following the death of his grandmother.

Ziam faced Nazim Sadykhov on December 6, 2025 at UFC 323. He won the fight by technical knockout via punches and elbows in the second round.

Ziam faced Tom Nolan on June 6, 2026 at UFC Fight Night 278. He lost the fight by unanimous decision.

Ziam faced Axel Sola on September 5, 2026 at UFC Fight Night 287. He lost the fight by knockout in the first round.

== Personal life ==
Ziam and his wife have a son (born 2024).

== Championships and accomplishments ==
=== Mixed martial arts ===
- Ultimate Fighting Championship
  - Performance of the Night (One time) vs. Matt Frevola
- HIT Fighting Championship
  - HIT Lightweight Championship (one time)
- Lyon Fighting Championship
  - LFC Lightweight Championship (one time)
- MMAjunkie.com
  - 2024 September Knockout of the Month vs. Matt Frevola

=== Kickboxing ===
- International Sport Kickboxing Association
  - 2015 ISKA K-1 European Light-middleweight (-72.5 kg) Champion

== Mixed martial arts record ==
Professional record breakdown
24 matches	18 wins	6 losses
By knockout	7	1
By submission	4	3
By decision	7	2

Res.	Record	Opponent	Method	Event	Date	Round	Time	Location	Notes
Loss	18–6	Axel Sola	KO (punch)	UFC Fight Night: Hooker vs. Parnasse	September 5, 2026	1	1:40	Paris, France	
Loss	18–5	Tom Nolan	Decision (unanimous)	UFC Fight Night: Muhammad vs. Bonfim	June 6, 2026	3	5:00	Las Vegas, Nevada, United States	
Win	18–4	Nazim Sadykhov	TKO (elbows and punches)	UFC 323	December 6, 2025	2	4:59	Las Vegas, Nevada, United States	
Win	17–4	Mike Davis	Decision (unanimous)	UFC Fight Night: Adesanya vs. Imavov	February 1, 2025	3	5:00	Riyadh, Saudi Arabia	
Win	16–4	Matt Frevola	KO (knee)	UFC Fight Night: Moicano vs. Saint Denis	September 28, 2024	3	2:59	Paris, France	Performance of the Night.
Win	15–4	Claudio Puelles	Decision (split)	UFC Fight Night: Moreno vs. Royval 2	February 24, 2024	3	5:00	Mexico City, Mexico	
Win	14–4	Jai Herbert	Decision (unanimous)	UFC Fight Night: Aspinall vs. Tybura	July 22, 2023	3	5:00	London, England	
Win	13–4	Michal Figlak	Decision (unanimous)	UFC Fight Night: Gane vs. Tuivasa	September 3, 2022	3	5:00	Paris, France	
Loss	12–4	Terrance McKinney	Submission (rear-naked choke)	UFC Fight Night: Makhachev vs. Green	February 26, 2022	1	2:11	Las Vegas, Nevada, United States	
Win	12–3	Luigi Vendramini	Decision (majority)	UFC 263	June 12, 2021	3	5:00	Glendale, Arizona, United States	
Win	11–3	Jamie Mullarkey	Decision (unanimous)	UFC Fight Night: Ortega vs. The Korean Zombie	October 18, 2020	3	5:00	Abu Dhabi, United Arab Emirates	
Loss	10–3	Don Madge	Decision (unanimous)	UFC 242	September 7, 2019	3	5:00	Abu Dhabi, United Arab Emirates	
Win	10–2	Yassine Belhadj	Submission (guillotine choke)	European Beatdown 5	February 2, 2019	3	1:05	La Louvière, Belgium	
Win	9–2	Julio Matos	Decision (unanimous)	European Beatdown 4	October 13, 2018	3	5:00	Mons, Belgium	
Win	8–2	Abner Lloveras	KO (punch)	HIT-FC 5	March 10, 2018	2	0:24	Zürich, Switzerland	Won the HIT Lightweight Championship.
Win	7–2	Alexey Valivakhin	TKO (punches and elbows)	World Warriors FC 8	September 27, 2017	1	3:01	Kyiv, Ukraine	
Win	6–2	Artem Tanshyn	TKO (elbows)	Road to World Warriors FC 4	April 29, 2017	1	3:18	Kyiv, Ukraine	
Loss	5–2	Wu Haotian	Submission (rear-naked choke)	Kunlun Fight MMA 7	December 15, 2016	1	3:41	Beijing, China	
Win	5–1	Damien Lapilus	KO (head kick)	Lyon FC 7	November 19, 2016	1	N/A	Lyon, France	Lightweight debut. Won the Lyon FC Lightweight Championship.
Loss	4–1	Viskhan Magomadov	Submission (rear-naked choke)	ACB 46	September 24, 2016	1	3:58	Olsztyn, Poland	Catchweight (159 lb) bout.
Win	4–0	Laïd Zerhouni	Submission (rear-naked choke)	Gladiator Fighting Arena 3	March 5, 2016	3	2:32	Nîmes, France	
Win	3–0	Jean Dutriaux	Submission (arm-triangle choke)	100% Fight 27	February 4, 2016	1	1:50	Paris, France	Return to Welterweight.
Win	2–0	Dominic Yeo	TKO (punches)	Westside Fighting Challenge 3	November 28, 2015	2	4:58	Dornbirn, Austria	Middleweight debut.
Win	1–0	Guerra Mathias	Submission (armbar)	Lyon FC 4	November 22, 2014	1	4:12	Lyon, France	Welterweight debut.

== Kickboxing record ==
Professional Kickboxing record
Date	Result	Opponent	Event	Location	Method	Round	Time
2017-10-28	Draw	(France) Mohamed Souane	Glory 47: Lyon	Lyon, France	Decision	3	3:00
2017-05-06	Win	(France) Yoan Benbedra	Takedown FC 1	Tarare, France	TKO (retirement)	3	
2016-04-08	Win	(Ukraine) Igor Kozak	Fight Night 1	Saint-Étienne, France	TKO (Doctor stoppage)	2	
2015-10-03	Win	(France) Yazid Boussaha	Boxe	Calvi, France	Decision (Unanimous)	5	3:00
Wins the vacant ISKA K-1 European 72.5kg title.
2015	Win	(France) Tom Pedreno	Sanda Pro Fight Tour	Tarare, France	TKO		
Legend: Win Loss Draw/No contest Notes

== See also ==
- List of male mixed martial artists
