= Taylor Lapilus =

French mixed martial art fighter

- Born: 8 April 1992 (age 34); Villepinte, France
- Other names: Double Impact
- Height: 5 ft 6 in (1.68 m)
- Weight: 135 lb (61 kg; 9.6 st)
- Division: Featherweight; Bantamweight
- Reach: 73 in (190 cm)
- Fighting out of: Paris, France
- Team: MMA Factory; SBG Ireland
- Years active: 2012–present

Professional boxing record
- Total: 1
- Wins: 1

Mixed martial arts record
- Total: 28
- Wins: 24
- By knockout: 4
- By submission: 6
- By decision: 14
- Losses: 4
- By decision: 4

Other information
- Boxing record from BoxRec
- Mixed martial arts record from Sherdog
- Last updated on: 26 June 2015

Taylor Lapilus (born 8 April 1992) is a French mixed martial artist and boxer who is currently signed to the Professional Fighters League. He formerly competed in Bantamweight division of the Ultimate Fighting Championship (UFC). He is a former TKO Major League MMA Bantamweight Champion. As of April 21, 2026, he is ranked fifth in the PFL bantamweight rankings.

== Background ==
Born in Villepinte and raised in Sevran, Lapilus competed in soccer on various levels in his youth. Before he began training in martial arts, he briefly attended college where he studied, and worked for a time as a welder.

== Mixed martial arts career ==
=== Early career ===
Lapilus followed the path of his brother Damien, who is also a professional mixed martial artist, and began training in mixed martial arts in 2010. He made his debut as a professional in 2012, competing as a featherweight for primarily for various regional promotions across France. He was able to compile a record along the way of 8–1. On the heels of his finish of Cyril Ericher in May 2014, Lapilus signed with the UFC in the fall of 2014.

=== Ultimate Fighting Championship ===
Lapilus was expected to make his promotional debut on 4 October 2014, as a short notice replacement against Dennis Siver at UFC Fight Night 53, filling in for an injured Robert Whiteford. However, the Swedish Mixed Martial Arts Federation subsequently deemed Lapilus an unsuitable opponent, and in turn, Charles Rosa was tabbed as the last-minute replacement.

Lapilus eventually made his debut against Rocky Lee on 11 April 2015, at UFC Fight Night 64. Lapilus won the fight via unanimous decision.

Lapilus faced Yuta Sasaki on 20 June 2015, at UFC Fight Night 69. Lapilus won the fight via TKO in the second round.

Lapilus faced Erik Pérez on 21 November 2015, at The Ultimate Fighter Latin America 2 Finale. He lost the fight by unanimous decision.

Lapilus next faced Leandro Issa on September 3, 2016, at UFC Fight Night 93. He won the fight by unanimous decision.

=== Post-UFC career ===
After the sole boxing bout in 2017, Lapilus racked Bantamweight Championships in both TKO Major League MMA and German MMA Championships. In November 2019, it was revealed that Lapilus has signed with a new, Afro-European MMA promotion ARES Fighting Championship. Lapilus was expected to make his promotional debut in the promotion's inaugural event on December 14, 2019 against Bryan Caraway. However, Caraway withdrew from the bout due to an injury and was replaced by Marcos Breno. He won the fight via unanimous decision.

Lapilus faced Wilson Reis at Ares FC 2 on December 12, 2021. He won the bout via unanimous decision.

Lapilus faced Demarte Pena for the vacant AFC Bantamweight Championship on April 16, 2022 at Ares FC 5. He won the bout and title via TKO stoppage in the first round.

=== Return to UFC ===
Lapilus was scheduled to face Khalid Taha on September 3, 2022, at UFC Fight Night 209. However, Lapilus withdrew a week before the event due to a broken hand and was later replaced by Cristian Quiñónez.

Lapilus was scheduled to face Muin Gafurov on September 2, 2023, at UFC Fight Night 226. However, Lapilus was instead matched up with Caolán Loughrán after Gafurov withdrew due to visa issues. He won the fight by unanimous decision.

Lapilus faced Farid Basharat on January 13, 2024, at UFC Fight Night 234. He lost the bout by unanimous decision.

Lapilus faced Cody Stamann on June 8, 2024, at UFC on ESPN 57. He won the fight by unanimous decision.

Lapilus was scheduled to face Felipe Lima on September 28, 2024, at UFC Fight Night 243. However, Lima withdrew from the fight for unknown reasons and was replaced by Vince Morales on short notice. Lapilus won the fight by unanimous decision.

Despite being 3–1 again in his second stint, on February 27, 2025, it was reported that Lapilus was once again removed from the UFC roster.

=== Professional Fighters League ===
On March 25, 2025, it was announced that Lapilus signed with Professional Fighters League.

Lapilus was scheduled to face Ali Taleb on May 23, 2025, at PFL Europe Paris. However in early May, the organization announced that the event was cancelled. The bout was re-scheduled and took place on July 5, 2025, at PFL Europe 2. Lapilus won the bout via unanimous decision.

Lapilus faced Liam Gittins on December 13, 2025, at PFL Champions Series 4, and won the bout via unanimous decision.

Lapilus faced Kasum Kasumov on February 7, 2026, at PFL Dubai: Nurmagomedov vs. Davis, and won the bout via TKO in the third round.

Lapilus faced Jake Hadley on May 23, 2026, at PFL Brussels. He won the fight via unanimous decision.

== Mixed martial arts style ==
Having started his martial arts career with grappling and Brazilian jiu-jitsu, he is a grappler. Lapilus is a striker, being a long time Muay Thai practitioner. He is interested in the Israeli fighting system Krav Maga, and he has participated in several induction trainings and programmes.

== Professional boxing career ==
After his first UFC run, Lapilus opted to try boxing, facing Heri Andriyanto on May 27, 2017. He won by unanimous decision.

== Mixed martial arts record ==
Professional record breakdown
29 matches	25 wins	4 losses
By knockout	5	0
By submission	6	0
By decision	14	4

Res.	Record	Opponent	Method	Event	Date	Round	Time	Location	Notes
Win	25–4	Jake Hadley	Decision (unanimous)	PFL Brussels: Habirora vs. Henderson	May 23, 2026	3	5:00	Brussels, Belgium	
Win	24–4	Kasum Kasumov	TKO (punches)	PFL Dubai: Nurmagomedov vs. Davis	February 7, 2026	3	0:47	Dubai, United Arab Emirates	
Win	23–4	Liam Gittins	Decision (unanimous)	PFL Lyon: Nemkov vs. Ferreira	December 13, 2025	3	5:00	Décines-Charpieu, France	
Win	22–4	Ali Taleb	Decision (unanimous)	PFL Europe 2 (2025)	July 5, 2025	3	5:00	Brussels, Belgium	
Win	21–4	Vince Morales	Decision (unanimous)	UFC Fight Night: Moicano vs. Saint Denis	September 28, 2024	3	5:00	Paris, France	
Win	20–4	Cody Stamann	Decision (unanimous)	UFC on ESPN: Cannonier vs. Imavov	June 8, 2024	3	5:00	Louisville, Kentucky, United States	
Loss	19–4	Farid Basharat	Decision (unanimous)	UFC Fight Night: Ankalaev vs. Walker 2	January 13, 2024	3	5:00	Las Vegas, Nevada, United States	
Win	19–3	Caolán Loughran	Decision (unanimous)	UFC Fight Night: Gane vs. Spivac	September 2, 2023	3	5:00	Paris, France	
Win	18–3	Demarte Pena	TKO (elbows and punches)	Ares FC 5	April 16, 2022	1	2:33	Paris, France	Won the inaugural Ares FC Bantamweight Championship.
Win	17–3	Wilson Reis	Decision (unanimous)	Ares FC 2	December 11, 2021	3	5:00	Paris, France	
Win	16–3	Marcos Breno	Decision (unanimous)	Ares FC 1	December 14, 2019	3	5:00	Dakar, Senegal	
Win	15–3	Nate Maness	TKO (kick to the body)	TKO 48	May 24, 2019	3	1:22	Gatineau, Quebec, Canada	Won the TKO Bantamweight Championship.
Win	14–3	Josh Hill	Decision (split)	TKO 45	December 7, 2018	3	5:00	Montreal, Quebec, Canada	
Loss	13–3	Denis Lavrentyev	Decision (unanimous)	RCC Intro 1	September 1, 2018	3	5:00	Ekaterinburg, Russia	
Win	13–2	Farbod Iran Nezhad	TKO (punches)	German MMA Championship 14	February 24, 2018	1	2:16	Castrop-Rauxel, Germany	Return to Bantamweight. Won the vacant GMC Bantamweight Championship.
Win	12–2	Ömer Solmaz	Decision (split)	German MMA Championship 13	December 16, 2017	5	5:00	Düsseldorf, Germany	Won the interim GMC Featherweight Championship.
Win	11–2	Leandro Issa	Decision (unanimous)	UFC Fight Night: Arlovski vs. Barnett	September 3, 2016	3	5:00	Hamburg, Germany	
Loss	10–2	Erik Pérez	Decision (unanimous)	The Ultimate Fighter Latin America 2 Finale: Magny vs. Gastelum	November 21, 2015	3	5:00	Monterrey, Mexico	
Win	10–1	Ulka Sasaki	TKO (punches)	UFC Fight Night: Jędrzejczyk vs. Penne	June 20, 2015	2	1:26	Berlin, Germany	Return to Bantamweight.
Win	9–1	Rocky Lee	Decision (unanimous)	UFC Fight Night: Gonzaga vs. Cro Cop 2	April 11, 2015	3	5:00	Kraków, Poland	
Win	8–1	Cyril Ericher	Submission (guillotine choke)	100% Fight 22	May 30, 2014	1	2:58	Aubervilliers, France	
Win	7–1	Osman Minbatirov	Decision (split)	Honor and Glory Fight Night 3	May 17, 2014	3	5:00	Béziers, France	
Win	6–1	Cyrille Dimbas	Submission (armbar)	100% Fight 19	March 22, 2014	1	3:41	Aubervilliers, France	Return to Featherweight.
Loss	5–1	Magomed Bibulatov	Decision (unanimous)	Grand European FC: Urban Legend Prestige 4	October 12, 2013	3	5:00	Villepinte, France	Bantamweight debut. For the vacant GEFC Bantamweight Championship.
Win	5–0	Nicolas Joannes	Submission	Knock Out Championship 6	April 6, 2013	1	2:50	Cognac, France	
Win	4–0	Chresus Mokima	Submission (armbar)	100% Fight 13	February 16, 2013	2	1:32	Aubervilliers, France	
Win	3–0	Steve Polifonte	Decision (unanimous)	100% Fight: Contenders 16	November 10, 2012	2	5:00	Paris, France	Won the 100% Fight Featherweight Tournament.
Win	2–0	Souksavanh Khampasath	Submission (triangle choke)	100% Fight: Contenders 16	November 10, 2012	1	0:43	Paris, France	Featherweight debut. 100% Fight Featherweight Tournament Semifinal.
Win	1–0	Isa Abiev	Submission (triangle choke)	Octogone Fighting Club 4	March 31, 2012	1	3:35	Hainaut, Belgium	Lightweight debut.

== Professional boxing record ==
1 fight	1 win	0 losses
By decision	1	0

No.	Result	Record	Opponent	Type	Round, time	Date	Location	Notes
1	Win	1–0	Heri Andriyanto	UD	4	27 May 2017	Resorts World Sentosa, Singapore	

== See also ==
- List of male mixed martial artists
