= Joselyne Edwards =

Panamanian mixed martial arts fighter

- Born: Joselyne Celina Edwards Loboriel; September 29, 1995 (age 31); Panama City, Panama
- Other names: La Pantera
- Height: 5 ft 8 in (1.73 m)
- Weight: 135 lb (61 kg; 9 st 9 lb)
- Division: Bantamweight
- Reach: 70 in (178 cm)
- Stance: Orthodox
- Fighting out of: Panama City, Panama
- Team: Kings MMA
- Rank: Purple belt in Brazilian Jiu-Jitsu
- Years active: 2015–present

Mixed martial arts record
- Total: 24
- Wins: 18
- By knockout: 8
- By submission: 4
- By decision: 6
- Losses: 6
- By submission: 1
- By decision: 5

Other information
- Mixed martial arts record from Sherdog

Joselyne Celina Edwards Loboriel (born September 29, 1995) is a Panamanian mixed martial artist who currently competes in the women's Bantamweight division of the Ultimate Fighting Championship (UFC). As of June 20, 2026, she is #1 in the Meta UFC women's bantamweight rankings.

== Background ==
Edwards started boxing when she was 13 years old, and after four years of boxing, she started doing MMA when she was 17. She had seen the UFC on TV in her home of Panama City, but she did not know a gym that taught MMA. She then started doing jiu-jitsu and after six months debuted in MMA.

== Mixed martial arts career ==
=== Early career ===
Edwards compiled a 9–2 record on the regional scene, winning the UCC Women's Bantamweight Championship in her homeland of Panama and defending it twice. In 2018, she moved to her camp to the United States, where she defeated former Bellator fighter Jessica Middleton via TKO on May 18, 2018, at The Fight Series. She would then defeat highly touted prospect Brenda Gonzales at KOTC: Aggressive Lifestyle on September 1, 2018, via armbar, in the process winning the KOTC Bantamweight Championship. Afterwards, she competed against fellow future UFC fighter Sarah Alpar for the LFA Women's Bantamweight Championship at LFA 55, losing the close bout via split decision.

=== Ultimate Fighting Championship ===
Edwards, as a replacement for Bethe Correia, faced Wu Yanan on January 16, 2021, at UFC on ABC 1. She won the bout via unanimous decision.

Edwards, as a replacement for Nicco Montaño, faced Karol Rosa on February 6, 2021, at UFC Fight Night 184. Edwards lost the fight via unanimous decision.

Edwards was scheduled to face Zarah Fairn Dos Santos on August 28, 2021, at UFC on ESPN 30. However, the contest was cancelled in late July as Edwards was removed from the event in favor of another bout.

Edwards faced Jessica-Rose Clark at UFC Fight Night 196 on October 23, 2021. She lost the fight via unanimous decision.

Edwards faced Ramona Pascual on June 11, 2022, at UFC 275. She won the fight via unanimous decision. 11 out of 16 media outlets scored the bout as a win for Pascual.

In a quick turnaround, Edwards replaced an injured Mariya Agapova to face Ji Yeon Kim at UFC 277 on July 9, 2022. At the weigh-ins, Edwards weighed in at 137.5 pounds, one and a half pounds over the bantamweight non-title fight limit and was fined 20% of her purse, which went to her opponent Kim. She won the fight via split decision.

Edwards faced Lucie Pudilová on April 15, 2023, at UFC on ESPN 44. At the weigh-ins, Edwards weighed in at 136.5 pounds, half a pound over the bantamweight non-title fight limit. Consequently, Edwards was fined 20% of her purse, which was awarded to Pudilová. She won the fight via a controversial split decision. Cageside commentators Daniel Cormier, Michael Bisping, and Brendan Fitzgerald all expressed shock that Edwards was declared the winner, with numerous media outlets also scoring the fight in favor of Pudilová.

Edwards faced Nora Cornolle on September 2, 2023, at UFC Fight Night 226. She lost the fight via unanimous decision.

Edwards faced Ailín Pérez on June 1, 2024, at UFC 302. She lost the fight again by unanimous decision.

Edwards faced Tamires Vidal on October 19, 2024 at UFC Fight Night 245. At the weigh-ins, Edwards weighed in at 139 pounds, three pounds over the bantamweight non-title fight limit. The bout proceeded at catchweight and Edwards was fined 30 percent of her purse which went to her opponent Vidal. She won the fight via a rear-naked choke submission at the end of the third round.

Edwards faced Chelsea Chandler on April 26, 2025 at UFC on ESPN 66. She won the fight by technical knockout in the first round.

Edwards was set to face former UFC Women's Bantamweight Championship challenger Mayra Bueno Silva on August 9, 2025 at UFC on ESPN 72. However, Bueno Silva pulled out due to undisclosed reasons and was replaced by Priscila Cachoeira. Edwards won the fight by knockout in the first round. This fight earned her a Performance of the Night award.

Edwards faced Nora Cornolle in a rematch on February 21, 2026, at UFC Fight Night 267. She won the fight via rear‑naked choke submission in the second round, with the finish resulting in a shoulder injury for Cornolle.

Replacing Yana Santos, who withdrew for undisclosed reasons, Edwards faced Norma Dumont on April 25, 2026 at UFC Fight Night 274. She won the fight via unanimous decision.

== Controversies ==
=== Altercation with Ailín Pérez ===
Before UFC Fight Night 232, Edwards and Ailín Pérez of Argentina had an altercation for unknown reasons in which Pérez appeared with some stitches under her left eye. Ailín declined to comment on the matter, stating she would do so only after the fight with Edwards. According to Pérez, it was her coach who broke up the altercation, stating, "This was an assault I had in the PI. It was some random person who came to attack me so the fight wouldn't happen." Later, Edwards told MMAMania.com, "While we were fighting, her coach attacked me from behind. He was choking me so [Ailín] could hit me. I practically had to fight both of them. He didn't protect anyone, he started the fight."

== Championships and accomplishments ==
- Ultimate Fighting Championship
  - Performance of the Night (One time) vs. Priscila Cachoeira
- King of the Cage
  - KOTC Bantamweight Championship (One time)
- Ultimate Combat Challenge
  - UCC Women's Bantamweight Championship (One time)
    - Two successful title defenses
- MMA Fighting
  - 2025 First Team MMA All-Star

== Mixed martial arts record ==
Professional record breakdown
24 matches	18 wins	6 losses
By knockout	8	0
By submission	4	1
By decision	6	5

Res.	Record	Opponent	Method	Event	Date	Round	Time	Location	Notes
Win	18–6	Norma Dumont	Decision (unanimous)	UFC Fight Night: Sterling vs. Zalal	April 25, 2026	3	5:00	Las Vegas, Nevada, United States	
Win	17–6	Nora Cornolle	Submission (rear-naked choke)	UFC Fight Night: Strickland vs. Hernandez	February 21, 2026	2	2:44	Houston, Texas, United States	
Win	16–6	Priscila Cachoeira	KO (punches)	UFC on ESPN: Dolidze vs. Hernandez	August 9, 2025	1	2:24	Las Vegas, Nevada, United States	Performance of the Night.
Win	15–6	Chelsea Chandler	TKO (punches)	UFC on ESPN: Machado Garry vs. Prates	April 26, 2025	1	2:31	Kansas City, Missouri, United States	
Win	14–6	Tamires Vidal	Submission (face crank)	UFC Fight Night: Hernandez vs. Pereira	October 19, 2024	3	4:33	Las Vegas, Nevada, United States	Catchweight (139 lb) bout; Edwards missed weight.
Loss	13–6	Ailín Pérez	Decision (unanimous)	UFC 302	June 1, 2024	3	5:00	Newark, New Jersey, United States	
Loss	13–5	Nora Cornolle	Decision (unanimous)	UFC Fight Night: Gane vs. Spivac	September 2, 2023	3	5:00	Paris, France	
Win	13–4	Lucie Pudilová	Decision (split)	UFC on ESPN: Holloway vs. Allen	April 15, 2023	3	5:00	Kansas City, Missouri, United States	Catchweight (136.5 lb) bout; Edwards missed weight.
Win	12–4	Kim Ji-yeon	Decision (split)	UFC 277	July 30, 2022	3	5:00	Dallas, Texas, United States	Return to Bantamweight; Edwards missed weight (137.5 lb).
Win	11–4	Ramona Pascual	Decision (unanimous)	UFC 275	June 11, 2022	3	5:00	Kallang, Singapore	Featherweight debut.
Loss	10–4	Jessica-Rose Clark	Decision (unanimous)	UFC Fight Night: Costa vs. Vettori	October 23, 2021	3	5:00	Las Vegas, Nevada, United States	
Loss	10–3	Karol Rosa	Decision (unanimous)	UFC Fight Night: Overeem vs. Volkov	February 6, 2021	3	5:00	Las Vegas, Nevada, United States	
Win	10–2	Wu Yanan	Decision (unanimous)	UFC on ABC: Holloway vs. Kattar	January 16, 2021	3	5:00	Abu Dhabi, United Arab Emirates	
Win	9–2	Pamela Gonzalez	KO (punches and body kick)	UWC Mexico 22	July 3, 2020	1	0:28	Tijuana, Mexico	
Loss	8–2	Sarah Alpar	Decision (split)	LFA 55	November 30, 2018	5	5:00	Dallas, Texas, United States	For the inaugural LFA Women's Bantamweight Championship.
Win	8–1	Brenda Gonzales	Submission (armbar)	KOTC: Aggressive Lifestyle	September 1, 2018	2	2:53	Ignacio, Colorado, United States	Won the KOTC Women's Bantamweight Championship.
Win	7–1	Jessica Middleton	TKO (punches)	The Fight Series 5	May 18, 2018	1	0:57	West Des Moines, Iowa, United States	Return to Bantamweight.
Win	6–1	Trisha Cicero	Decision (unanimous)	Ultimate Combat Challenge: Fantastic Fight Night 8	October 14, 2017	3	5:00	Panama City, Panama	Flyweight debut.
Win	5–1	Francelys Rivero	TKO (punches)	Ultimate Combat Challenge: Fantastic Fight Night 5	May 20, 2017	1	3:30	Panama City, Panama	Defended the UCC Women's Bantamweight Championship.
Win	4–1	Mauris Marcano Gonzales	Submission (armbar)	Ultimate Combat Challenge 31	October 14, 2016	1	2:28	Panama City, Panama	Defended the UCC Women's Bantamweight Championship.
Win	3–1	Yacqueline Arosemena	TKO (retirement)	Ultimate Combat Challenge 29	July 1, 2016	1	1:58	Panama City, Panama	Won the vacant UCC Women's Bantamweight Championship.
Win	2–1	Heydi Irias	TKO (punches)	Ultimate Combat Challenge 28	May 7, 2016	2	3:45	El Progreso, Honduras	
Loss	1–1	Mauris Marcano Gonzales	Submission (armbar)	Ultimate Combat Challenge 25	September 11, 2015	2	1:54	Panama City, Panama	
Win	1–0	Evelyn Jessenia Caballero Llanes	KO (punch)	Ultimate Combat Challenge 24	May 15, 2015	1	0:10	Panama City, Panama	Bantamweight debut.

== See also ==
- List of current UFC fighters
- List of female mixed martial artists
