= Thiago Moisés =

Brazilian mixed martial arts fighter

- Born: Thiago Moisés; March 23, 1995 (age 31); Indaiatuba, Sao Paulo, Brazil
- Height: 5 ft 9 in (1.75 m)
- Weight: 155 lb (70 kg; 11 st 1 lb)
- Division: Lightweight
- Reach: 70.5 in (179 cm)
- Fighting out of: Coconut Creek, Florida, United States
- Team: American Top Team (2012–present); Fighting Nerds
- Rank: Black belt in Brazilian Jiu-Jitsu under Paulo Streckert
- Years active: 2012–present

Mixed martial arts record
- Total: 29
- Wins: 19
- By knockout: 4
- By submission: 8
- By decision: 7
- Losses: 10
- By knockout: 3
- By submission: 1
- By decision: 6

Other information
- Mixed martial arts record from Sherdog

Thiago Moisés (born 23 March 1995) is a Brazilian mixed martial artist who competed in the Lightweight division of the Ultimate Fighting Championship. A professional since 2012. He previously competed for the promotions RFA and LFA.

== Background ==
The son of a professional mixed martial artist, Thiago began training Brazilian Jiu-Jitsu at the age of eight.

== Mixed martial arts career ==
=== RFA Lightweight champion ===
Moisés made his professional MMA debut on May 19, 2012. He would go on to amass a 5–1 record, before signing with Resurrection Fighting Alliance.

Moisés made his RFA debut against Javon Wright at RFA 28 on August 7, 2015. He won the fight by a second-round rear naked choke submission.

In his second fight with the promotion, Moisés was scheduled to face Zach Juusola for the vacant RFA Lightweight Championship at RFA 35 on February 19, 2016. Juusola later withdrew from the bout due to an injury, and was replaced by David Castillo who moved up from the co-main event fight with David Putvin. Moisés won the fight with a second-round helicopter armbar submission.

Moisés was scheduled to make his first title defense against Jamall Emmers at RFA 38 on June 3, 2016. He won the fight by a fifth-round technical knockout.

Moisés was scheduled to make his second title defense against Zach Freeman at RFA 44 on September 30, 2016. Moisés dominated almost every round of the bout, winning the fight by unanimous decision, with scores of 49–46, 49–46, 50–45.

=== Legacy Fighting Alliance ===
RFA and LFC merged in early 2017 to form Legacy Fighting Alliance. Accordingly, Moisés was given the opportunity to fight for the inaugural LFA lightweight title against Robert Watley at LFA 17 on July 21, 2017. Watley won the fight by unanimous decision, with all three judges awarding him every round of the bout.

Moisés was scheduled to face Jeff Peterson at LFA 41 on June 1, 2018. He won the fight by a second-round guillotine choke submission.

=== Dana White Contender Series ===
Moisés made his Tuesday Night Contender Series debut on August 11, 2018, at Dana White's Contender Series Brazil 3. He faced Gleidson Moraes and won the fight via knockout. The win earned Moisés a spot in the UFC.

=== Ultimate Fighting Championship ===
In his UFC debut Moisés faced against Beneil Dariush on November 10, 2018, at UFC Fight Night 139. He lost the fight via unanimous decision.

Moisés faced Kurt Holobaugh on May 11, 2019, at UFC 237. He won the fight by unanimous decision.

Moisés faced Damir Ismagulov on August 31, 2019, at UFC Fight Night 157. He lost the fight via unanimous decision after getting knocked down in the first round.

Moisés faced Michael Johnson on May 13, 2020, at UFC Fight Night 171. He won the fight via a heel hook submission in round two.

Moisés was scheduled to face Jalin Turner on September 5, 2020, at UFC Fight Night 176. However, on September 5, 2020, Moisés tested positive for COVID-19 and the bout against Turner was cancelled.

Moisés faced Bobby Green on October 31, 2020, at UFC Fight Night 181. He won the fight via unanimous decision.

Moisés faced Alexander Hernandez on February 27, 2021, at UFC Fight Night 186. He won the fight via unanimous decision.

Moisés faced Islam Makhachev on July 17, 2021, at UFC on ESPN 26. He lost the fight via a rear-naked choke submission in the fourth round.

Moisés faced Joel Álvarez on November 13, 2021, at UFC Fight Night 197. At the weigh-ins, Álvarez weighed in at 157.5 pounds, one and a half pounds over the lightweight non-title fight limit. The bout proceeded at a catchweight with Álvarez fined 30% of his purse, which went to Moisés. Moisés lost the fight via technical knockout in round one.

Moisés faced Christos Giagos at UFC on ESPN 38 on June 25, 2022. He won the fight via a rear-naked choke submission in the first round. This win earned him his first Performance of the Night bonus award.

Moisés was scheduled to face Guram Kutateladze on January 21, 2023, at UFC 283. However, Kutateladze pulled out in early January for undisclosed reasons. He was replaced by promotional newcomer Melquizael Costa. He won the fight via a neck face submission in the second round.

Moisés faced Benoît Saint-Denis on September 2, 2023, at UFC Fight Night 226, in Paris. He lost the fight via technical knockout in the second round. The bout was also awarded the Fight of the Night bonus award.

Moisés was scheduled to face Brad Riddell on March 16, 2024, at UFC Fight Night 239. On February 14, 2024, it was announced that Riddell withdrew from the fight, and he was replaced by promotional newcomer Mitch Ramirez. Moises won the bout at the beginning of the third round by technical knockout.

Moisés faced Ľudovít Klein on June 8, 2024, at UFC on ESPN 57. He lost the fight by unanimous decision.

Moisés faced Trey Ogden on January 11, 2025, at a UFC Fight Night 249. He won the fight by unanimous decision.

Moisés faced Jared Gordon on May 17, 2025, at UFC Fight Night 256. He lost the fight by knockout in the first round.

Moisés faced Gauge Young on April 18, 2026 at UFC Fight Night 273. He lost the fight by split decision.

On June 18, 2026, it was reported that Moisés was removed from the UFC roster.

== Personal life ==
Moisés is married.

== Championships and accomplishments ==
=== Mixed martial arts ===
- Ultimate Fighting Championship
  - Performance of the Night (One time) vs. Christos Giagos
  - Fight of the Night (One time) vs. Benoît Saint-Denis
  - UFC.com Awards
    - 2020: Ranked #8 Submission of the Year vs. Michael Johnson

== Mixed martial arts record ==
Professional record breakdown
29 matches	19 wins	10 losses
By knockout	4	3
By submission	8	1
By decision	7	6

Res.	Record	Opponent	Method	Event	Date	Round	Time	Location	Notes
Loss	19–10	Gauge Young	Decision (split)	UFC Fight Night: Burns vs. Malott	18 April 2026	3	5:00	Winnipeg, Manitoba, Canada	
Loss	19–9	Jared Gordon	KO (punches)	UFC Fight Night: Burns vs. Morales	17 May 2025	1	3:37	Las Vegas, Nevada, United States	
Win	19–8	Trey Ogden	Decision (unanimous)	UFC Fight Night: Dern vs. Ribas 2	11 January 2025	3	5:00	Las Vegas, Nevada, United States	
Loss	18–8	Ľudovít Klein	Decision (unanimous)	UFC on ESPN: Cannonier vs. Imavov	8 June 2024	3	5:00	Louisville, Kentucky, United States	
Win	18–7	Mitch Ramirez	TKO (leg kicks)	UFC Fight Night: Tuivasa vs. Tybura	16 March 2024	3	0:15	Las Vegas, Nevada, United States	
Loss	17–7	Benoît Saint-Denis	TKO (punches)	UFC Fight Night: Gane vs. Spivac	2 September 2023	2	4:44	Paris, France	Fight of the Night.
Win	17–6	Melquizael Costa	Submission (face crank)	UFC 283	21 January 2023	2	4:05	Rio de Janeiro, Brazil	
Win	16–6	Christos Giagos	Submission (rear-naked choke)	UFC on ESPN: Tsarukyan vs. Gamrot	25 June 2022	1	3:05	Las Vegas, Nevada, United States	Performance of the Night.
Loss	15–6	Joel Álvarez	TKO (elbows and punches)	UFC Fight Night: Holloway vs. Rodríguez	13 November 2021	1	3:01	Las Vegas, Nevada, United States	Catchweight (157.5 lb) bout; Álvarez missed weight.
Loss	15–5	Islam Makhachev	Submission (rear-naked choke)	UFC on ESPN: Makhachev vs. Moisés	17 July 2021	4	2:38	Las Vegas, Nevada, United States	
Win	15–4	Alexander Hernandez	Decision (unanimous)	UFC Fight Night: Rozenstruik vs. Gane	27 February 2021	3	5:00	Las Vegas, Nevada, United States	
Win	14–4	Bobby Green	Decision (unanimous)	UFC Fight Night: Hall vs. Silva	31 October 2020	3	5:00	Las Vegas, Nevada, United States	
Win	13–4	Michael Johnson	Submission (achilles lock)	UFC Fight Night: Smith vs. Teixeira	13 May 2020	2	0:25	Jacksonville, Florida, United States	
Loss	12–4	Damir Ismagulov	Decision (unanimous)	UFC Fight Night: Andrade vs. Zhang	31 August 2019	3	5:00	Shenzhen, China	
Win	12–3	Kurt Holobaugh	Decision (unanimous)	UFC 237	10 May 2019	3	5:00	Rio de Janeiro, Brazil	
Loss	11–3	Beneil Dariush	Decision (unanimous)	UFC Fight Night: The Korean Zombie vs. Rodríguez	10 November 2018	3	5:00	Denver, Colorado, United States	
Win	11–2	Gleidson Cutis	KO (head kick)	Dana White's Contender Series Brazil 3	11 August 2018	1	4:21	Las Vegas, Nevada, United States	Catchweight (160 lb) bout; Cutis missed weight.
Win	10–2	Jeff Peterson	Submission (guilotine choke)	LFA 41	1 June 2018	2	4:31	Prior Lake, Minnesota, United States	
Loss	9–2	Robert Watley	Decision (unanimous)	LFA 17	21 July 2017	5	5:00	Charlotte, North Carolina, United States	For the inaugural LFA Lightweight Championship.
Win	9–1	Zach Freeman	Decision (unanimous)	RFA 44	30 September 2016	5	5:00	St. Charles, Missouri, United States	Defended the RFA Lightweight Championship.
Win	8–1	Jamall Emmers	TKO (punches)	RFA 38	3 June 2016	5	2:52	Costa Mesa, California, United States	Defended the RFA Lightweight Championship.
Win	7–1	David Castillo	Submission (armbar)	RFA 35	19 February 2016	2	3:19	Orem, Utah, United States	Return to Lightweight. Won the vacant RFA Lightweight Championship.
Win	6–1	Javon Wright	Submission (rear-naked choke)	RFA 28	7 August 2015	2	2:10	St. Louis, Missouri, United States	
Loss	5–1	Jason Knight	Decision (unanimous)	Atlas Fights: Cage Rage 25	30 May 2015	3	5:00	Biloxi, Mississippi, United States	Featherweight debut. For the Atlas Fights Featherweight Championship.
Win	5–0	Francivaldo Trinaldo	Submission (triangle armbar)	Fighten Decagon MMA	11 May 2014	3	1:58	Londrina, Brazil	Lightweight bout.
Win	4–0	Leonardo de Oliveira Guarizzo	Decision (unanimous)	Talent MMA Circuit 2	20 July 2013	3	5:00	Indaiatuba, Brazil	
Win	3–0	José Conceição	Decision (unanimous)	Real Fight 9	28 Jul 2013	3	5:00	São José dos Campos, Brazil	Lightweight bout.
Win	2–0	Dennis Bentes	KO (head kick)	Eco Combat 2	22 September 2012	1	0:23	Indaiatuba, Brazil	
Win	1–0	Wellingon Dias	Submission (armbar)	CT Fight	19 May 2012	1	2:50	Indaiatuba, Brazil	

== See also ==
- List of Dana White's Contender Series alumni
- List of male mixed martial artists
