= Zarah Fairn =

French mixed martial arts fighter

- Born: Zarah Fairn dos Santos; December 10, 1986 (age 39); Salvador, Brazil
- Other names: Infinite
- Nationality: French
- Height: 5 ft 10 in (1.78 m)
- Weight: 145 lb (66 kg; 10 st 5 lb)
- Division: Bantamweight; Featherweight
- Reach: 72.0 in (183 cm)
- Fighting out of: Paris, France
- Team: 10EME ROUND
- Rank: Purple belt in Brazilian Jiu-Jitsu
- Years active: 2013–present

Mixed martial arts record
- Total: 13
- Wins: 6
- By knockout: 4
- By decision: 2
- Losses: 7
- By knockout: 1
- By submission: 2
- By decision: 4

Other information
- Mixed martial arts record from Sherdog

Zarah Fairn dos Santos (born December 10, 1986) is a French female mixed martial artist who competed in the Bantamweight and Featherweight divisions in the Ultimate Fighting Championship.

== Early life ==
Fairn was born in Salvador, Bahia, Brazil to a Moroccan father and Brazilian mother. She started training in boxing at the age of 12 under her father who was a boxer. At 14 she moved to Paris, France joining a brother who was a professional basketball player there. She has a master's degree in social education and sport and a license in sports law.

== Mixed martial arts career ==
=== Early career ===
Fairn faced future Bellator title challenger Sinead Kavanagh at BAMMA 24: Ireland vs. England on February 26, 2016. She lost the close bout via split decision.

=== Ultimate Fighting Championship ===
Fairn faced Megan Anderson on October 6, 2019, at UFC 243. She lost the fight by first-round submission.

Fairn faced Felicia Spencer on February 29, 2020, at UFC Fight Night 169. She lost by first-round TKO.

Fairn was scheduled to face Josiane Nunes on April 17, 2021, at UFC on ESPN: Whittaker vs. Gastelum. Fairn weighed in at 147 pounds, eight pounds over the 139-pound catchweight limit. (The bantamweight fight was moved to a catchweight prior to the start of the weigh-ins.) The bout against Nunes was canceled due to the weight discrepancy after Nunes weighed in at 136 pounds.

Fairn was scheduled to face Joselyne Edwards on August 28, 2021, at UFC on ESPN: Barboza vs. Chikadze, but the fight was canceled in late July when Edwards was removed from the event for another bout.

Fairn was scheduled to face Ailín Pérez on September 3, 2022, at UFC Fight Night 209, but was pulled from the event and replaced by Stephanie Egger.

The match between Fairn and Nunes was rescheduled for January 21, 2023, at UFC 283. She lost the fight via unanimous decision.

Fairn was scheduled to face Hailey Cowan on September 2, 2023, at UFC Fight Night 226. However Cowan was forced out of the event due to an injury, and she was replaced by Jacqueline Cavalcanti. She lost the fight via unanimous decision.

On September 14, it was announced that Fairn was no longer on the UFC roster.

=== Post UFC Career ===
In her first fight since leaving the UFC, Fairn would face Brazilian Gisele Moreira at Ares FC 22 on 14 June 2024. She would lose the fight succumbing to a rear-naked choke in the first round.

== Championships and accomplishments ==
- Cage Warriors Academy South East
  - CWSE Bantamweight Championship (One time)

== Mixed martial arts record ==
Professional record breakdown
13 matches	6 wins	7 losses
By knockout	4	1
By submission	0	2
By decision	2	4

Res.	Record	Opponent	Method	Event	Date	Round	Time	Location	Notes
Loss	6–7	Gisele Moreira	Submission (rear-naked choke)	Ares FC 22	June 14, 2024	1	2:11	Paris, France	
Loss	6–6	Jacqueline Cavalcanti	Decision (unanimous)	UFC Fight Night: Gane vs. Spivac	September 2, 2023	3	5:00	Paris, France	Catchweight (140 lb) bout.
Loss	6–5	Josiane Nunes	Decision (unanimous)	UFC 283	January 21, 2023	3	5:00	Rio de Janeiro, Brazil	
Loss	6–4	Felicia Spencer	TKO (punches and elbows)	UFC Fight Night: Benavidez vs. Figueiredo	February 29, 2020	1	3:37	Norfolk, Virginia, United States	
Loss	6–3	Megan Anderson	Submission (triangle choke)	UFC 243	October 6, 2019	1	3:57	Melbourne, Australia	Return to Featherweight.
Win	6–2	Izabela Badurek	TKO (punches)	Ladies Fight Night 7	December 15, 2017	1	1:55	Łódź, Poland	Catchweight (141 lb) bout.
Win	5–2	Suvi Salmimies	Decision (unanimous)	Cage 40	September 9, 2017	3	5:00	Helsinki, Finland	
Win	4–2	Kerry Hughes	TKO (punches)	British Challenge MMA 18	February 18, 2017	1	2:53	Colchester, England	Won CWSE Bantamweight Championship. Bantamweight debut.
Loss	3–2	Sinead Kavanagh	Decision (split)	BAMMA 24: Kone Vs. Phillips	February 27, 2016	3	5:00	Dublin, Ireland	
Win	3–1	Liubov Belyakova	TKO (punches)	W.I.N. FC	July 18, 2015	1	N/A	Shenzhen, China	
Win	2–1	Marion Nicolai	Decision (unanimous)	Gladiator Fighting Arena 2	March 7, 2015	2	5:00	Nîmes, France	
Loss	1–1	Elina Nilsson	Decision (unanimous)	The Zone FC 12	October 12, 2013	3	5:00	Gothenburg, Sweden	Catchweight (152 lb) bout.
Win	1–0	Helin Paara	TKO (corner stoppage)	MMA Raju 11	April 20, 2013	1	4:00	Tallinn, Estonia	Featherweight debut.

== See also ==
- List of female mixed martial artists
