= Yana Santos =

Russian mixed martial artist (born 1989)

- Born: Yana Kunitskaya; November 11, 1989 (age 36); Murmansk, Russian SFSR, Soviet Union
- Other names: Foxy
- Nationality: Russian
- Height: 5 ft 6 in (1.68 m)
- Weight: 135 lb (61 kg; 9.6 st)
- Division: Featherweight; Bantamweight
- Reach: 68 1/2 in (174 cm)
- Style: Taekwondo, Muay Thai, ARB, Gaidojutsu
- Fighting out of: Saint Petersburg, Russia
- Team: Jackson Wink MMA; American Top Team
- Rank: Black belt in Taekwondo

Mixed martial arts record
- Total: 27
- Wins: 17
- By knockout: 7
- By submission: 1
- By decision: 9
- Losses: 9
- By knockout: 3
- By submission: 2
- By decision: 4
- No contests: 1

Other information
- Spouse: Thiago Santos
- Mixed martial arts record from Sherdog

Yana Santos (né Kunitskaya; November 11, 1989) is a Russian professional mixed martial artist who competes in the women's bantamweight division of the Ultimate Fighting Championship (UFC). Prior to joining the UFC, Santos competed for Invicta FC where she held the Invicta FC Bantamweight Champion. As of October 31, 2026, she is #8 in the Meta UFC women's bantamweight rankings.

== Biography ==
Santos was born in 1989 in Murmansk, Murmansk Oblast, in northwestern Russia. Her mother, Olga Kunitskaya, was a professional gymnast, and her father, Joseph, was a pro skier. She has a younger sister named Victoria.

Santos became involved in martial arts early in her childhood, starting with taekwondo in preschool.

At the age of 12, she began competing in hand-to-hand combat. When she was 16 years old, Santos went to live and study in St. Petersburg and entered the Lesgaft National State University Boxing team. At 18, she began practicing mixed martial arts (MMA).

== Mixed martial arts career ==
=== Early career ===
Santos made her professional MMA debut on May 23, 2009, at a K-1 World Grand Prix event in Poland. She defeated Magdalena Jarecka by technical knockout (TKO) in the first round. After winning two of her next three fights, Santos faced undefeated prospect Cindy Dandois at M-1 Challenge XXII on December 10, 2010. She defeated Dandois by TKO in 34 seconds. On November 19, 2011, Santos faced Arune Lauzeckaite at Bushido Hero's World Grand Prix Lithuania, winning by TKO in the first round.

In 2012, Santos faced Ekaterina Saraykina at the Verdict Fighting Championship on February 11, winning by TKO in the first round. In March, she faced Anna Melikhova at Lion's Fights and won by unanimous decision after two rounds. She then defeated Sylwia Kusiak by TKO in round one at the Baltic Arena in Koszalin, Poland, in June. Santos was scheduled to face Danielle West at Starlight Events: Gladiator World Cup 2012 on July 6 in Marbella, Spain, but the event was cancelled.

On August 9, 2012, Santos announced that she was pregnant with her first child. In August 2013, she announced the end of her sports career and her transition to coaching. However, she returned from retirement three years later. She then signed a contract with the Invicta Fighting Championships.

=== Invicta Fighting Championships ===
Santos defeated Tonya Evinger for the Invicta FC Bantamweight title on November 18, 2016. On December 1, the win was overturned to a no contest, so Evinger retained her title. Santos faced Evinger in a rematch in the main event of Invicta FC 22 on March 25, 2017, and lost by a rear-naked choke submission in the second round.

Santos defeated Raquel Pa'aluhi at Invicta FC 25 on August 31, 2017, to win the vacant Invicta FC Bantamweight Championship.

=== Ultimate Fighting Championship ===
Santos made her UFC promotional debut at UFC 222 on March 3, 2018, against Cris Cyborg for the featherweight title. She lost the fight via TKO at 3:25 in the first round.

Next, Santos faced Lina Länsberg on October 6, 2018, at UFC 229. She won the fight by unanimous decision (30-27).

Santos then faced Marion Reneau on March 9, 2019, at UFC Fight Night 146. She won the fight by unanimous decision.

Santos faced Aspen Ladd on December 7, 2019, at UFC on ESPN 7. She lost the fight by technical knockout at 0:33 in round three.

Santos was originally scheduled to fight Ketlen Vieira on August 1, 2020, at UFC Fight Night: Holm vs. Aldana, but the fight was later moved to UFC Fight Night 174 on August 8, 2020. Subsequently, on July 30 Vieira was removed from the card for undisclosed reasons and replaced by Julija Stoliarenko. Santos won the fight via unanimous decision (30-26, 30-27, 30-27).

The bout with Ketlen Vieira was rescheduled to February 20, 2021, at UFC Fight Night 185. At the weigh-ins, Vieira weighed 138 pounds (62.6 kg), two pounds over the women's bantamweight non-title fight limit. She was fined 20% of her purse, which went to Santos. The bout proceeded at catchweight. Santos won the fight via unanimous decision (30-27, 30-27, 30-27).

Santos faced Irene Aldana on July 10, 2021, at UFC 264. At the weigh-ins, Aldana weighed 139.5 pounds (63.28 kg), three and a half pounds over the bantamweight non-title fight limit. Her bout proceeded at catchweight. Aldana was fined 30% of her purse, which went to Santos. Santos lost the fight via technical knockout at 4:35 in round one.

Santos faced former UFC Women's Bantamweight Champion Holly Holm on March 25, 2023, at UFC on ESPN 43. She lost the fight via unanimous decision (30-26, 30-27).

Santos was scheduled to face The Ultimate Fighter: Heavy Hitters women's featherweight winner Macy Chiasson on July 1, 2023, at UFC on ESPN 48 However, Chiasson withdrew two weeks after the fight announcement. She was replaced by Karol Rosa in a featherweight bout. Santos lost the fight via split decision (28-29, 29-28, 29-28).

Santos was scheduled to face Norma Dumont on January 13, 2024, at UFC Fight Night 234. However, Santos pulled out due to a broken nose.

Santos faced Chelsea Chandler on August 10, 2024, at UFC on ESPN 61. At the weigh-ins, Chandler weighed in at 141 pounds (63.96 kg), five pounds over the bantamweight non-title fight limit. The bout proceeded at catchweight. Chandler was fined 20 percent of her purse, which went to Santos. She won the fight by unanimous decision (30-27, 29-28, 29-28).

Santos faced former UFC Women's Bantamweight Champion Miesha Tate on May 3, 2025, at UFC on ESPN 67. She won the fight by unanimous decision.

Santos faced Macy Chiasson on October 4, 2025, at UFC 320. At the weigh-ins, Chiasson weighed in at 137.5 pounds, one and a half pounds over the women's bantamweight non-title fight limit. The bout proceeded at catchweight and Chiasson was fined a percentage of her purse, which went to Santos. Santos won the fight by unanimous decision.

Santos was scheduled to face Norma Dumont on April 25, 2026 at UFC Fight Night 274. However, for undisclosed reasons, Santos withdrew and was replaced by Joselyne Edwards.

Santos faced Luana Santos on October 31, 2026, at UFC Fight Night 292. She lost the fight by unanimous decision.

== Personal life ==
Santos is married to former UFC and current Professional Fighters League (PFL) fighter Thiago Santos. She has a son from a previous relationship. The couple became engaged in December 2020. On August 16, 2021, Santos announced they were expecting their first child together. Some fans had speculated that Santos was pregnant during her fight against Irene Aldana, which had taken place a month earlier. However, Santos denied these claims. She noted that female fighters in Nevada, where the fight occurred, are required to undergo pregnancy tests as part of the standard medical screening before each fight.

== Championships and accomplishments ==
- Ultimate Fighting Championship
  - Tied (Karol Rosa) for third most decision wins in UFC Women's Bantamweight division history (88.9%)
  - Second highest significant strike accuracy in UFC Women's Bantamweight division history (57.5%)
  - Third most total strikes landed in UFC Women's Bantamweight division history (1275)
- Invicta Fighting Championships
  - Invicta FC Bantamweight Champion (One time)
  - Performance of the Night (twice) vs. Tonya Evinger and Raquel Pa'aluhi
- Other
  - 2007 K-1: World GP in Amsterdam
  - 2007 Russian Taekwondo Champion
  - 2010 Bushido Women's MMA Champion
  - 2011 Russian Muay Thai Champion

== Mixed martial arts record ==
Professional record breakdown
27 matches	17 wins	9 losses
By knockout	7	3
By submission	1	2
By decision	9	4
No contests	1	

Res.	Record	Opponent	Method	Event	Date	Round	Time	Location	Notes
Loss	17–9 (1)	Luana Santos	Decision (unanimous)	UFC Fight Night: Moicano vs. Nolan	October 31, 2026	3	5:00	Las Vegas, Nevada, United States	
Win	17–8 (1)	Macy Chiasson	Decision (unanimous)	UFC 320	October 4, 2025	3	5:00	Las Vegas, Nevada, United States	Catchweight (137.5 lb) bout; Chiasson missed weight.
Win	16–8 (1)	Miesha Tate	Decision (unanimous)	UFC on ESPN: Sandhagen vs. Figueiredo	May 3, 2025	3	5:00	Des Moines, Iowa, United States	
Win	15–8 (1)	Chelsea Chandler	Decision (unanimous)	UFC on ESPN: Tybura vs. Spivac 2	August 10, 2024	3	5:00	Las Vegas, Nevada, United States	Catchweight (141 lb) bout; Chandler missed weight.
Loss	14–8 (1)	Karol Rosa	Decision (split)	UFC on ESPN: Strickland vs. Magomedov	July 1, 2023	3	5:00	Las Vegas, Nevada, United States	Featherweight bout.
Loss	14–7 (1)	Holly Holm	Decision (unanimous)	UFC on ESPN: Vera vs. Sandhagen	March 25, 2023	3	5:00	San Antonio, Texas, United States	
Loss	14–6 (1)	Irene Aldana	TKO (punches)	UFC 264	July 10, 2021	1	4:35	Las Vegas, Nevada, United States	Catchweight (139.5 lb) bout; Aldana missed weight.
Win	14–5 (1)	Ketlen Vieira	Decision (unanimous)	UFC Fight Night: Blaydes vs. Lewis	February 20, 2021	3	5:00	Las Vegas, Nevada, United States	Catchweight (138 lb) bout; Vieira missed weight.
Win	13–5 (1)	Julija Stoliarenko	Decision (unanimous)	UFC Fight Night: Lewis vs. Oleinik	August 8, 2020	3	5:00	Las Vegas, Nevada, United States	
Loss	12–5 (1)	Aspen Ladd	TKO (punches)	UFC on ESPN: Overeem vs. Rozenstruik	December 7, 2019	3	0:33	Washington, D.C., United States	
Win	12–4 (1)	Marion Reneau	Decision (unanimous)	UFC Fight Night: Lewis vs. dos Santos	March 9, 2019	3	5:00	Wichita, Kansas, United States	
Win	11–4 (1)	Lina Länsberg	Decision (unanimous)	UFC 229	October 6, 2018	3	5:00	Las Vegas, Nevada, United States	Return to Bantamweight.
Loss	10–4 (1)	Cris Cyborg	TKO (punches)	UFC 222	March 3, 2018	1	3:25	Las Vegas, Nevada, United States	For the UFC Women's Featherweight Championship.
Win	10–3 (1)	Raquel Pa'aluhi	Decision (unanimous)	Invicta FC 25	August 31, 2017	5	5:00	Lemoore, California, United States	Won the vacant Invicta FC Bantamweight Championship. Performance of the Night.
Loss	9–3 (1)	Tonya Evinger	Submission (rear-naked choke)	Invicta FC 22	March 25, 2017	2	4:32	Kansas City, Missouri, United States	For the Invicta FC Bantamweight Championship.
NC	9–2 (1)	Tonya Evinger	NC (overturned)	Invicta FC 20	November 18, 2016	1	1:59	Kansas City, Missouri, United States	For the Invicta FC Bantamweight Championship. Performance of the Night. Originally a submission (armbar) win for Kunitskaya; overturned after Evinger appealed the loss due to a controversial referee call.
Win	9–2	Wu Yanan	TKO (punches)	Fightspirit Championship 6	September 4, 2016	2	0:32	Saint Petersburg, Russia	
Loss	8–2	Zaira Dyshekova	Submission (armbar)	ACB 32	March 26, 2016	1	3:38	Moscow, Russia	Catchweight (137 lb) bout.
Win	8–1	Sylwia Kusiak	TKO (corner stoppage)	Baltic Arena 1	June 15, 2012	1	0:50	Koszalin, Poland	Return to Bantamweight.
Win	7–1	Anna Melikhova	Decision (unanimous)	Lion's Fights 1	March 3, 2012	2	5:00	Saint Petersburg, Russia	Lightweight debut.
Win	6–1	Ekaterina Saraykina	TKO (punches)	Verdict FC 1	February 11, 2012	1	1:05	Moscow, Russia	Featherweight bout.
Win	5–1	Arune Lauzeckaite	TKO (punches)	Bushido Lithuania: Hero's Lithuania 2011	November 19, 2011	1	1:34	Vilnius, Lithuania	
Win	4–1	Cindy Dandois	TKO (punches)	M-1 Challenge 22	December 10, 2010	1	0:34	Moscow, Russia	Featherweight bout.
Win	3–1	Kamila Bałanda	TKO (punches)	Bushido Lithuania: Hero's Lithuania 2010	November 20, 2010	1	4:26	Vilnius, Lithuania	
Loss	2–1	Maria Hougaard Djursaa	Decision (unanimous)	Fight Gala 14	May 29, 2010	3	5:00	Odense, Denmark	Return to Bantamweight.
Win	2–0	Vladena Yavorskaya	Submission (rear-naked choke)	Bushido FC: Legend	November 28, 2009	1	3:20	Saint Petersburg, Russia	Featherweight debut.
Win	1–0	Magdalena Jarecka	TKO (punches)	K-1 World Grand Prix: Poland 2009	May 23, 2009	1	1:38	Łódź, Poland	Bantamweight debut.

== Pay-per-view bouts ==
No.	Event	Fight	Date	Venue	City	PPV Buys
1.	UFC 222	Cyborg vs. Kunitskaya	March 3, 2018	T-Mobile Arena	Paradise, Nevada, United States	260,000

Awards and achievements
Preceded by Tonya Evinger	3rd Invicta FC Bantamweight Champion; August 31, 2017 – February 7, 2018	Succeeded by Sarah Kaufman
