= Josiane Nunes =

Brazilian mixed martial arts fighter (born 1993)

- Born: December 23, 1993 (age 32); Curitiba, Brazil
- Other names: Josi
- Height: 5 ft 3 in (1.60 m)
- Weight: 135 lb (61 kg; 9 st 9 lb)
- Division: Bantamweight; Featherweight
- Reach: 67 in (170 cm)
- Style: Muay Thai
- Fighting out of: Fazenda Rio Grande, Brazil
- Team: Striker's House
- Years active: 2013–present

Mixed martial arts record
- Total: 14
- Wins: 10
- By knockout: 7
- By decision: 3
- Losses: 4
- By knockout: 1
- By decision: 3

Other information
- Mixed martial arts record from Sherdog

Josiane Nunes (born December 23, 1993) is a Brazilian mixed martial artist who competes in the Ultimate Fighting Championship. A professional MMA fighter since 2013, she has competed in the Bantamweight and Featherweight divisions.

== Mixed martial arts career ==
=== Early career ===
Nunes started her professional MMA career in 2013 and amassed a record of 7–1 prior to signing with the UFC.

=== Ultimate Fighting Championship ===
Nunes was scheduled to face Zarah Fairn on April 17, 2021, at UFC on ESPN: Whittaker vs. Gastelum. Fairn weighed in at 147 pounds, eight pounds over the 139-pound catchweight limit. (The bantamweight fight was moved to a catchweight prior to the start of the weigh-ins.) The bout against Nunes was canceled due to the weight discrepancy after Nunes weighed in at 136 pounds.

Making her UFC debut, Nunes faced Bea Malecki at UFC on ESPN: Cannonier vs. Gastelum on August 21, 2021. She won the bout via knockout in round one. This win earned her a Performance of the Night award.

Nunes was scheduled to face Wu Yanan on February 26, 2022, at UFC Fight Night: Makhachev vs. Green. However, Wu was pulled from the fight for undisclosed reasons and she was replaced by promotional newcomer Jennifer Gonzalez. In turn, Gonzalez was released from UFC one week ahead of the event for undisclosed reasons (later revealed to be related to an USADA incident). She was replaced by promotional newcomer Ramona Pascual. Nunes won the bout by unanimous decision. In April 2022, she reached No. 8 in World Women's Featherweight rankings according to Fight Matrix.

The match between Nunes and Fairn was rescheduled for January 21, 2023, at UFC 283. She won the fight via unanimous decision.

Nunes faced Chelsea Chandler on March 16, 2024, at UFC Fight Night 239 in what was originally scheduled to be a bantamweight bout. At the weigh-in, Chelsea weighed in at 137 pounds, one pound over the bantamweight non-title fight limit. The bout proceeded at catchweight and Chandler was fined 20% of her purse which went to Nunes. Nunes lost the bout by unanimous decision.

Nunes faced Jacqueline Cavalcanti on August 24, 2024 at UFC on ESPN 62. She lost the fight by split decision.

Nunes faced Priscila Cachoeira on March 15, 2025 at UFC Fight Night 254. She lost the fight by knockout via an uppercut in the first round.

== Championships and accomplishments ==
=== Mixed martial arts ===
- Ultimate Fighting Championship
  - Performance of the Night (One time) vs. Bea Malecki

== Mixed martial arts record ==
Professional record breakdown
14 matches	10 wins	4 losses
By knockout	7	1
By decision	3	3

Res.	Record	Opponent	Method	Event	Date	Round	Time	Location	Notes
Loss	10–4	Priscila Cachoeira	KO (punch)	UFC Fight Night: Vettori vs. Dolidze 2	March 15, 2025	1	2:46	Las Vegas, Nevada, United States	
Loss	10–3	Jacqueline Cavalcanti	Decision (split)	UFC on ESPN: Cannonier vs. Borralho	August 24, 2024	3	5:00	Las Vegas, Nevada, United States	
Loss	10–2	Chelsea Chandler	Decision (unanimous)	UFC Fight Night: Tuivasa vs. Tybura	March 16, 2024	3	5:00	Las Vegas, Nevada, United States	Return to Bantamweight; Chandler missed weight (137 lb).
Win	10–1	Zarah Fairn	Decision (unanimous)	UFC 283	January 21, 2023	3	5:00	Rio de Janeiro, Brazil	
Win	9–1	Ramona Pascual	Decision (unanimous)	UFC Fight Night: Makhachev vs. Green	February 26, 2022	3	5:00	Las Vegas, Nevada, United States	Return to Featherweight.
Win	8–1	Bea Malecki	KO (punch)	UFC on ESPN: Cannonier vs. Gastelum	August 21, 2021	1	4:54	Las Vegas, Nevada, United States	Performance of the Night.
Win	7–1	Quezia Zbonik	TKO (punches)	Forze MMA 1	November 28, 2020	2	2:31	Curitiba, Brazil	
Win	6–1	Dione Barbosa de Lima	TKO (punches)	Katana Fight 10	December 7, 2019	2	4:36	Curitiba, Brazil	Return to Bantamweight.
Win	5–1	Juliana Araujo	KO (punch)	Curitiba Top Fight 12	September 28, 2019	2	3:51	Curitiba, Brazil	Featherweight bout.
Win	4–1	Ariele Ribeiro	KO (punches)	Sicario MMA 4	March 29, 2019	2	3:52	Curitiba, Brazil	Lightweight debut.
Win	3–1	Laisa Coimbra	TKO (punches)	Striker's House Cup 82	January 26, 2018	1	3:38	Curitiba, Brazil	
Win	2–1	Areane Monteiro	Decision (split)	Elite Fazenda Combat 2	August 30, 2015	3	5:00	Fazenda Rio Grande, Brazil	Featherweight debut.
Loss	1–1	Taila Santos	Decision (unanimous)	Striker's House Cup 31	November 23, 2013	3	5:00	Curitiba, Brazil	
Win	1–0	Elaine Albuquerque	KO (punches)	União Fight Combat 1	October 12, 2013	2	0:00	União da Vitória, Brazil	Bantamweight debut.

== See also ==
- List of female mixed martial artists
