= Nora Cornolle =

French mixed martial artist and Muay Thai fighter (born 1989)

- Born: December 6, 1989 (age 36); Épinay-sur-Seine, France
- Other names: Wonder
- Height: 5 ft 7 in (170 cm)
- Weight: 135 lb (61 kg; 9 st 9 lb)
- Division: Bantamweight
- Style: Muay Thai
- Fighting out of: Épinay-sur-Seine, France
- Team: US Metro Bizot
- Trainer: Redwan Ameur / Johnny Frachey

Kickboxing record
- Total: 37
- Wins: 32
- By knockout: 5
- Losses: 4
- Draws: 1

Mixed martial arts record
- Total: 14
- Wins: 10
- By knockout: 6
- By submission: 2
- By decision: 2
- Losses: 4
- By submission: 1
- By decision: 3

Other information
- Mixed martial arts record from Sherdog

Nora Cornolle (born December 6, 1989) is a French professional mixed martial artist and Muay Thai fighter who competes in the women's Bantamweight division of the Ultimate Fighting Championship (UFC). As a Muay Thai fighter, she was the French national professional champion and she won a silver medal at the 2022 World Games. As of November 14, 2026, she is #12 in the Meta UFC women's bantamweight rankings.

== Background ==
Cornolle was born in the La Source-Les Presles quarter of Épinay-sur-Seine; she still lives there. After obtaining a literary baccalaureate, she continued in a preparatory class for languages and human sciences at the Auguste-Blanqui high school in Saint-Ouen-sur-Seine, then obtained a master's degree in communication at CELSA Sorbonne University. During a study internship in Thailand, she learned Muay Thai at the age of 21.

== Muay Thai career ==
Attracted since her youth by combat sports but held back by her family, Cornolle began practicing late. With the Puteaux Scorp Thaï club, this does not prevent her from being five times French champion, including two professional titles, European champion and silver medalist at the World Games in 2022.

In 2018, Cornolle stood out with two victories in muay thai and K-1 against Mallaury Kalachnikoff, then her career took a break with the diagnosis of an autoimmune disease, Hashimoto's thyroiditis, but she managed to cope with it through rigorous physical preparation.

== Professional mixed martial arts career ==
In 2022, after her return in 2021 and an entire season combining international Muay Thai competitions and professional MMA fights, Cornolle decided to focus exclusively on MMA.

=== Ultimate Fighting Championship ===
For her first fight in the UFC, Cornolle faced Joselyne Edwards on September 2, 2023, at UFC Fight Night 226. She won the fight via unanimous decision.

Cornolle faced Melissa Mullins on April 6, 2024, at UFC Fight Night 240. At the weigh-ins, Cornolle and Mullins weighed in at 138.5 and 138 pounds, 2 and a half and 2 pounds over the bantamweight non-title fight limit respectively. Their bout proceeded at catchweight with neither being issued a fine. Cornolle won the bout via technical knockout in the second round.

Cornolle was scheduled to face Germaine de Randamie on September 28, 2024, at UFC Fight Night 243. However, de Randamie withdrew from the fight due to a broken finger and a fractured foot which led her to be replaced by Jacqueline Cavalcanti. Cornolle lost the bout by split decision.

Cornolle was scheduled to face Hailey Cowan on May 10, 2025, at UFC 315. However, the bout was moved to UFC 314 on April 12, 2025, for unknown reasons. At the weigh-ins, Cornolle weighed in at 137.5 pounds, one and a half pounds over the bantamweight non-title fight limit. The bout proceeded at catchweight and Cornolle was fined 20 percent of her purse which went to her opponent Hailey Cowan. Cornolle won the fight via a rear-naked choke submission in the second round.

Cornelle faced Karol Rosa on August 2, 2025, at UFC Fight Night 257. She lost the fight by unanimous decision.

Cornolle faced Joselyne Edwards in a rematch on February 21, 2026, at UFC Fight Night 267. She was defeated by rear‑naked choke in the second round, sustaining a shoulder injury in the process.

Cornolle faced Klaudia Syguła on September 5, 2026, at UFC Fight Night 287. She won the fight by unanimous decision.

== Titles and accomplishments ==
=== Muay Thai ===
==== Professional ====
- Académie Française de Muay Thaï
  - 2015 AFMT National B-class −63.5 kg Champion
  - 2016 AFMT National B-class −63.5 kg Champion
  - 2017 AFMT National A-class −60 kg Champion
- Fédération Française de Kickboxing, Muaythai et Disciplines Associées
  - 2018 FFKMDA −61.2 kg Champion

==== Amateur ====
- International Federation of Muaythai Associations
  - 2017 IFMA European Championships -60 kg (bronze)
  - 2018 IFMA Muaythai Open Cup in Antalya -60 kg (gold)
  - 2021 IFMA World Championships -63.5 kg (bronze)
  - 2022 IFMA European Championships -63.5 kg (gold)
  - 2022 IFMA World Championships -63.5 kg (silver)
- World Games
  - 2022 World Games Muay Thai -63.5 kg (silver)
- Arafura Games
  - 2019 Arafura Games Muay Thai -63.5 kg (bronze)

== Mixed martial arts record ==
Professional record breakdown
14 matches	10 wins	4 losses
By knockout	6	0
By submission	2	1
By decision	2	3

Res.	Record	Opponent	Method	Event	Date	Round	Time	Location	Notes
Win	10–4	Klaudia Syguła	Decision (unanimous)	UFC Fight Night: Hooker vs. Parnasse	September 5, 2026	3	5:00	Paris, France	
Loss	9–4	Joselyne Edwards	Submission (rear-naked choke)	UFC Fight Night: Strickland vs. Hernandez	February 21, 2026	2	2:44	Houston, Texas, United States	
Loss	9–3	Karol Rosa	Decision (unanimous)	UFC on ESPN: Taira vs. Park	August 2, 2025	3	5:00	Las Vegas, Nevada, United States	
Win	9–2	Hailey Cowan	Submission (rear-naked choke)	UFC 314	April 12, 2025	2	1:52	Miami, Florida, United States	Catchweight (137.5 lb) bout; Cornolle missed weight.
Loss	8–2	Jacqueline Cavalcanti	Decision (split)	UFC Fight Night: Moicano vs. Saint Denis	September 28, 2024	3	5:00	Paris, France	
Win	8–1	Melissa Mullins	TKO (knee to the body and head kicks)	UFC Fight Night: Allen vs. Curtis 2	April 6, 2024	2	3:06	Las Vegas, Nevada, United States	Catchweight (138.5 lb) bout; both fighters missed weight.
Win	7–1	Joselyne Edwards	Decision (unanimous)	UFC Fight Night: Gane vs. Spivac	September 2, 2023	3	5:00	Paris, France	
Win	6–1	Hassna Gaber	TKO (leg injury)	UAE Warriors 38	March 17, 2023	1	2:45	Abu Dhabi, United Arab Emirates	
Win	5–1	Sanaa Mandar	TKO (punches)	UAE Warriors 37	February 26, 2023	1	2:47	Abu Dhabi, United Arab Emirates	Catchweight (139 lb) bout.
Win	4–1	Priscila de Souza	TKO (punches)	Hexagone MMA 6	January 22, 2023	2	2:25	Paris, France	
Win	3–1	Asmaa Abash	TKO (elbows)	UAE Warriors 32	September 16, 2022	3	3:15	Abu Dhabi, United Arab Emirates	Catchweight (142 lb) bout.
Win	2–1	Juliet Chukwu	Submission (rear-naked choke)	Benin FC 7	April 23, 2022	1	1:25	Cotonou, Benin	
Win	1–1	Marie Loiseau	TKO (punches)	Gladiator Fighting Arena 13	April 2, 2022	1	4:16	Nimes, France	Bantamweight debut.
Loss	0–1	Jacqueline Cavalcanti	Decision (unanimous)	Free Fight Academy Challenge 2	July 10, 2021	3	5:00	Paris, France	Featherweight debut.

== Muay Thai and Kickboxing record ==
Professional Muay Thai and Kickboxing record
32 Wins (7 (T)KOs), 4 Losses, 1 Draw
Date	Result	Opponent	Event	Location	Method	Round	Time
2019-06-29	Win	(Thailand) Hongyoklek Kor.Prasert	Golden Arena Boxing	Fréjus, France	TKO (Corner stoppage)	2	
2019-04-14	Win	(Thailand)		Thailand	Decision	5	2:00
2018-11-09	Win	(France) Marine Lefebvre	Best Of Siam 14	Paris, France	Decision (Unanimous)	5	3:00
2018-10-12	Win	(Belarus) Mariya Valent	All Star Muay-Thai	Aubervilliers, France	Decision (Unanimous)	4	3:00
2018-05-12	Win	(France) Mallaury Kalachnikoff	Partouche Kickboxing Tour	Hyères, France	Decision (Unanimous)	3	3:00
2018-04-21	Win	(Portugal) Carolina Da Silva	Muay Thai Spirit 6	Les Herbiers, France	TKO (retirement)	2	
2018-04-07	Win	(France) Anaëlle Angerville	Finales Championnat De France Pro	Saint Ouen, France	Decision (Split)	5	3:00
Wins the FFKMDA National −61.2 kg title.
2018-03-03	Loss	(France) Maurine Atef	TEK Fight	Meaux, France	Decision (Unanimous)	3	3:00
2018-02-10	Win	(France) Anaëlle Angerville	The Diamond II	Drancy, France	Decision	5	3:00
2017-12-08	Loss	(Netherlands) Orinta van der Zee	Enfusion Live 59	Abu Dhabi, United Arab Emirates	Ext.R Decision	4	3:00
2017-11-25	Loss	(Sweden) Isa Tidblad	Rumble Of The Kings	Partille, Sweden	Decision	5	3:00
2017-06-20	Win	(Australia) Sam Brown	Enfusion Reality - Final Tournament, Final	Koh Samui, Thailand	Decision (Unanimous)	3	3:00
2017-06-20	Win	(England) Niamh Kinehan	Enfusion Reality - Final Tournament, Semifinals	Koh Samui, Thailand	Decision (Unanimous)	3	3:00
2017-04-29	Draw	(England) Niamh Kinehan	Hanuman Fight 3	Saint-Hilaire-de-Riez, France	Decision (Split)	5	3:00
2017-04-01	Win	(France) Anaëlle Angerville	Konateam Tournament	Villiers-sur-Marne, France	Decision	5	3:00
2017-01-21	Win	(France) Stéphanie Ielö Page	Show Thai 16	Aubervilliers, France	Decision	5	3:00
Wins the AFMT National -60kg title.
2016-12-03	Win	(France) Mallaury Kalachnikoff	Road To Duel	Paris, France	Decision (Unanimous)	3	3:00
2016-11-19	Win	(Italy) Jessica Murinu	Les Princes de Salm IV	Saint-Dié-des-Vosges, France	TKO (Referee stoppage)		
2016-10-22	Win	(Italy) Barbara Ruffolo	Shock Muay 8	Saint-Denis, France	Decision (Unanimous)	5	3:00
2016-05-17	Win	(France) Stéphanie Ielö Page	Show Thai 15	Aubervilliers, France	Decision (Unanimous)	5	3:00
2016-04-16	Win	(France) Clara Ricignuolo	ONE VERSUS ONE III	Trappes, France	TKO (Doctor stoppage)	1	
Wins the 2016 AFMT National B-class −63.5 kg title.
2016-03-26	Win	(France) Valentina Simanikhina	Kings Of Muay Thai 9	Luxembourg, Luxembourg	TKO (Corner stoppage)	4	3:00
2016-03-05	Win	(France) Pauline David	Le Choc des Légendes	Saint-Ouen, France	TKO (4 Knockdowns)	4	
2015-06-20	Win	(France) Houddour Dridi	Finales Championnat De France	Toulon, France	KO (Right cross)	1	
Wins the 2015 AFMT National B-class −63.5 kg title.
2015-05-08	Win	(France) Pauline David	Show Thai 12	Aubervilliers, France	Decision	5	2:00
2015-03-07	Win	(France) Morgane Manfredi	Ultimate Fight 2	Lavérune, France	Decision (Unanimous)	5	2:00
2014-06-02	Win	(Italy)	Kombat League	Verona, Italy	Decision (Unanimous)	5	2:00
2014-05-24	Win	(France) Pauline David	Coupe du Loiret Muay Thai	Saint-Pryvé-Saint-Mesmin, France	Decision	3	3:00
2014-03-29	Loss	(France) Sandie Ney	Kings Of Muay Thai 5	Luxembourg, Luxembourg	Decision (Split)	5	2:00
Legend: Win Loss Draw/No contest Notes

Amateur Muay Thai record
Date	Result	Opponent	Event	Location	Method	Round	Time
2022-07-17	Loss	(Australia) Zoe Putorak	2022 World Games, Tournament Final	Birmingham, United States	TKO	3	
Wins the 2022 World Games Muay Thai -63.5kg Silver medal.
2022-07-16	Win	(Thailand) Janejira Wankrue	2022 World Games, Tournament Semifinals	Birmingham, United States	Decision (29:28)	3	3:00
2022-07-15	Win	(Canada) Savannah Foden	2022 World Games, Tournament Quarterfinals	Birmingham, United States	TKO	2	
2022-06-04	Loss	(Turkey) Bediha Tacyildiz	2022 IFMA World Championships, Tournament Final	Abu Dhabi, United Arab Emirates	Decision (30:27)	3	3:00
Wins the 2022 IFMA World Championships -63.5kg Silver medal.
2022-06-02	Win	(Bahrain) Brena Cardozo	2022 IFMA World Championships, Tournament Semifinals	Abu Dhabi, United Arab Emirates	Decision (30:27)	3	3:00
2022-05-30	Win	(Saudi Arabia) Asrar Alshehri	2022 IFMA World Championships, Tournament Quarterfinals	Abu Dhabi, United Arab Emirates	TKO		
2022-05-28	Win	(United States) Erin Clayton	2022 IFMA World Championships, Tournament First Round	Abu Dhabi, United Arab Emirates	Decision (30:27)	3	3:00
2022-02-20	Win	(Russia) Valeria Albul	2022 IFMA European Championships, Tournament Final	Istanbul, Turkey	Decision (29:28)	3	3:00
Wins the 2022 IFMA European Championships -63.5kg Gold medal.
2022-02-18	Win	(Turkey) Gözdenur Göktaş	2022 IFMA European Championships, Tournament Semifinals	Istanbul, Turkey	Decision (30:27)	3	3:00
2021-12-10	Loss	(Russia) Svetlana Vinnikova	2021 IFMA World Championships, Tournament Semifinals	Bangkok, Thailand	Decision (29:28)	3	3:00
Wins the 2021 IFMA World Championships -63.5kg Bronze medal.
2021-12-09	Win	(Turkey) Gözdenur Göktaş	2021 IFMA World Championships, Tournament Quarterfinals	Bangkok, Thailand	Decision (30:27)	3	3:00
2021-12-07	Win	(Germany) Raffaella Dibiase Ebert	2021 IFMA World Championships, Tournament First Round	Bangkok, Thailand	TKO (retirement)	2	
2019-04-	Loss	(Australia) Zoe Putorak	2019 Arafura Games, Tournament Semifinals	Darwin, Australia	Decision	3	3:00
Wins the 2019 Arafura Games Muay Thai -63.5kg Bronze medal.
2017-10-19	Loss	(Russia) Ekaterina Vinnikova	2017 IFMA European Championships, Tournament Semifinals	Paris, France	Decision (29:28)	3	3:00
Wins the 2017 IFMA European Championships -60kg Bronze medal.
2017-10-17	Win	(Hungary) Suzsvan Nagy	2017 IFMA European Championships, Tournament Quarterfinals	Paris, France	TKO (Knees)	2	
2015-08-	Loss	(Australia) Melissa Anderson	2015 IFMA World Championships, Tournament Quarterfinals	Bangkok, Thailand	Decision	3	3:00
Legend: Win Loss Draw/No contest Notes

== See also ==
- List of female mixed martial artists
- List of current UFC fighters
