= Chelsea Chandler =

American mixed martial artist (born 1994)

- Born: January 29, 1994 (age 32); Stockton, California, U.S.
- Height: 5 ft 8 in (173 cm)
- Weight: 145 lb (66 kg; 10 st 5 lb)
- Division: Bantamweight
- Reach: 68 in (173 cm)
- Fighting out of: Stockton, California, U.S.
- Team: Cesar Gracie Jiu-Jitsu
- Rank: Purple belt in Brazilian Jiu-Jitsu
- Years active: 2018–present

Mixed martial arts record
- Total: 12
- Wins: 8
- By knockout: 2
- By submission: 3
- By decision: 3
- Losses: 4
- By knockout: 1
- By decision: 3

Other information
- Mixed martial arts record from Sherdog

Chelsea Chandler (born January 29, 1994) is an American professional mixed martial artist who competes in the women's Bantamweight division of the Ultimate Fighting Championship (UFC). A professional since 2018, she has also previously competed for Invicta Fighting Championships (Invicta FC). As of October 17, 2026, she is #9 in the Meta UFC women's bantamweight rankings.

== Background ==
Chandler played basketball and competed in track in high school. She started training at Tiger Muay Thai, Thailand in 2011 and joined Nick Diaz's Academy after she finished college.

== Mixed martial arts career ==
=== Invicta Fighting Championships ===
Chandler made her promotional debut on March 24, 2018, at Invicta FC 28: Mizuki vs. Jandiroba against Kerri Kenneson. She lost the fight via unanimous decision.

On the next fight, she faced Mitzi Merry on November 16, 2018, at Invicta FC 32: Spencer vs. Sorenson. She won the fight via unanimous decision.

Her third fight in Invicta came on June 7, 2019, at Invicta FC 35: Bennett vs. Rodriguez facing Brittney Victoria Grizzelle. She won the fight via technical knockout in round two.

Chandler faced Olivia Parker on July 2, 2020, at Invicta FC 40: Ducote vs. Lima. She won the fight via rear naked choke submission in round one.

Chandler faced Courtney King on May 11, 2022, at Invicta FC 47. She won the bout via unanimous decision.

=== Ultimate Fighting Championship ===
Chandler was scheduled to face Leah Letson in her UFC debut on October 1, 2022, at UFC Fight Night 211. However, Letson pulled out in late August for personal reasons and was replaced by Julija Stoliarenko, therefore changing the pairing to a catchweight of 140 pounds. She won the bout via TKO stoppage at the end of the first round. This win earned her the Performance of the Night award.

Chandler faced Norma Dumont on July 15, 2023, at UFC Fight Night 224. She lost the fight by unanimous decision.

Chandler faced Josiane Nunes on March 16, 2024, at UFC Fight Night 239 in what was scheduled to be a bantamweight bout. At the weigh-in, Chelsea weighed in at 137 pounds, one pound over the bantamweight non-title fight limit. The bout proceeded at catchweight and Chelsea was fined 20% of her purse which went to her opponent Nunes. Chandler won the bout by unanimous decision.

Chandler faced Yana Santos on August 10, 2024 at UFC on ESPN 61. At the weigh-ins, Chandler weighed in at 141 pounds, five pounds over the bantamweight non-title fight limit. The bout proceeded at catchweight and Chandler was fined 20 percent of her purse which went to Santos. She lost the fight by unanimous decision.

Chandler faced Joselyne Edwards on April 26, 2025 at UFC on ESPN 66. She lost the fight by technical knockout in the first round.

Chandler faced Priscila Cachoeira on June 6, 2026 at UFC Fight Night 278. She won the fight via an armbar submission in the first round.

Chandler faced Melissa Croden on October 17, 2026, at UFC Fight Night 291. She won the fight via a kimura submission in the first round.

== Championships and accomplishments ==
- Ultimate Fighting Championship
  - Performance of the Night (One time) vs. Julija Stoliarenko

== Mixed martial arts record ==
Professional record breakdown
12 matches	8 wins	4 losses
By knockout	2	1
By submission	3	0
By decision	3	3

Res.	Record	Opponent	Method	Event	Date	Round	Time	Location	Notes
Win	8–4	Melissa Croden	Submission (kimura)	UFC Fight Night: Buckley vs. Malott	October 17, 2026	1	4:52	Edmonton, Alberta, Canada	
Win	7–4	Priscila Cachoeira	Submission (armbar)	UFC Fight Night: Muhammad vs. Bonfim	June 6, 2026	1	3:42	Las Vegas, Nevada, United States	
Loss	6–4	Joselyne Edwards	TKO (punches)	UFC on ESPN: Machado Garry vs. Prates	April 26, 2025	1	2:31	Kansas City, Missouri, United States	
Loss	6–3	Yana Santos	Decision (unanimous)	UFC on ESPN: Tybura vs. Spivac 2	August 10, 2024	3	5:00	Las Vegas, Nevada, United States	Catchweight (141 lb) bout; Chandler missed weight.
Win	6–2	Josiane Nunes	Decision (unanimous)	UFC Fight Night: Tuivasa vs. Tybura	March 16, 2024	3	5:00	Las Vegas, Nevada, United States	Return to Bantamweight; Chandler missed weight (137 lb).
Loss	5–2	Norma Dumont	Decision (unanimous)	UFC on ESPN: Holm vs. Bueno Silva	July 15, 2023	3	5:00	Las Vegas, Nevada, United States	
Win	5–1	Julija Stoliarenko	TKO (punches)	UFC Fight Night: Dern vs. Yan	October 1, 2022	1	4:15	Las Vegas, Nevada, United States	Catchweight (140 lb) bout. Performance of the Night.
Win	4–1	Courtney King	Decision (unanimous)	Invicta FC 47	May 11, 2022	3	5:00	Kansas City, Kansas, United States	
Win	3–1	Olivia Parker	Submission (rear-naked choke)	Invicta FC 40	July 2, 2020	1	1:05	Kansas City, Missouri, United States	Featherweight debut. Performance of the Night.
Win	2–1	Brittney Victoria	TKO (punches)	Invicta FC 35	June 7, 2019	2	3:58	Kansas City, Missouri, United States	Performance of the Night.
Win	1–1	Mitzi Merry	Decision (unanimous)	Invicta FC 32	November 16, 2018	3	5:00	Kansas City, Missouri, United States	Catchweight (136.6 lb) bout; Chandler missed weight.
Loss	0–1	Kerri Kenneson	Decision (unanimous)	Invicta FC 28	March 24, 2018	3	5:00	Kansas City, Missouri, United States	Bantamweight debut.

== See also ==
- List of current UFC fighters
- List of female mixed martial artists
