= Serghei Spivac =

Moldovan mixed martial artist (born 1995)

- Born: January 24, 1995 (age 31); Chișinău, Moldova
- Other names: Polar Bear
- Height: 6 ft 3 in (191 cm)
- Weight: 252 lb (114 kg; 18 st 0 lb)
- Division: Heavyweight
- Reach: 78 in (198 cm)
- Stance: Orthodox
- Fighting out of: Chișinău, Moldova
- Team: MIR Production
- Rank: Black belt in Brazilian Jiu-Jitsu
- Years active: 2014–present

Mixed martial arts record
- Total: 25
- Wins: 18
- By knockout: 7
- By submission: 8
- By decision: 3
- Losses: 7
- By knockout: 4
- By decision: 3

Other information
- Mixed martial arts record from Sherdog

Serghei Spivac (born January 24, 1995) is a Moldovan professional mixed martial artist who competes in the Heavyweight division of the Ultimate Fighting Championship (UFC). A professional since 2014, he has also formerly competed for World Warriors Fighting Championships, Eagles Fighting Championship, N1 Pro and Real Fight Promotion. As of October 3, 2026, he is #14 in the Meta UFC heavyweight rankings.

== Mixed martial arts career ==
=== Early career ===
Serghei Spivac made his MMA debut in September 2014 with the Ukrainian promotion Real Fight Promotion, at 19 years old. He faced Andrey Serebrianikov as his first opponent. He won the fight in the last minute of the first round, by way of TKO.

His second fight was with the Ukrainian-based World Warriors Fighting Championships, at WWFC Ukraine Selection 1, where he faced Evgeniy Bova in the main event. Spivac won the fight in the first round by way of a kimura.

His second fight with World Warriors Fighting Championships was during WWFC: Ukraine Selection 4, in the main event. His opponent was Yuri Gorbenko, whom he defeated in the first round through an armbar.

Spivac would than fight against Dimitriy Mikutsa, under the N1 Pro organization. Spivac submitted Mikutsa through an armbar during the last minute of the second round.

Under the banner of Eagles Fighting Championship, Spivac faced Artem Cherkov. Spivac would beat him in the first round, by way of a head kick.

After a year-long layoff, Spivac would return to the World Warriors Fighting Championships. His first opponent was Luke Morton, whom he beat by KO. In his next fight Spivac fought against the MMA veteran Travis Fulton for the vacant WWFC Heavyweight Championship, a fight which he won in the first round by a rear naked choke. He would defend the title 10 months later against the Croatian fighter Ivo Cuk, winning the bout in the first round by TKO. His last fight with WWFC was his last title defense, five months after his fight with Cuk, against Tony Lopez. He defeated Lopez by a neck crank in the last minute of the first round.

=== Ultimate Fighting Championship ===
Spivac made his UFC debut during UFC Fight Night 151, at 23 years old, against Walt Harris, replacing Alexey Oleynik. He suffered the first professional loss of his career. Harris pushed Serghei up to the cage, dazed him with a left straight and dropped him to the floor with a barrage of knees. After a series of grounded strikes, the referee awarded Harris a win, after 50 seconds, by way of TKO.

Five months later, Spivac fought against Tai Tuivasa at UFC 243. Spivac would begin the fight being cautious of Tuivasa's power. Spivac was dropped once in the first round by a leg kick. Spivac then began catching Tuivasa's leg kicks and would take the Australian down. Whenever the Australian would return to his feet, Spivac would pursue takedowns. The fight ended in the fourth minute of the second round, Spivac took Tuivasa down for the 7th time in the fight. He was able to obtain the mount and after several hard punches and elbows he was able to obtain an arm triangle choke, awarding him his first UFC win.

Spivac faced Marcin Tybura on February 29, 2020, at UFC Fight Night 169. He lost the fight via unanimous decision.

Spivac was expected to face Carlos Felipe on May 9, 2020, at then UFC 250. However, on April 9, Dana White, the president of UFC announced that this event was postponed to a future date Eventually the bout was scheduled on July 19, 2020, at UFC Fight Night 172. He won the fight via majority decision.

Spivac was expected to face Tom Aspinall on October 11, 2020 at UFC Fight Night 179. However Spivac withdrew from the bout for undisclosed reason and he was replaced by promotional newcomer Alan Baudot.

Spivac was scheduled to face Jared Vanderaa on December 12, 2020, at UFC 256 However, Vanderaa tested positive for COVID-19 during fight week and had to be pulled. The pair eventually met on February 20, 2021, at UFC Fight Night 185. Spivac won the fight via technical knockout in round two.

Spivac faced Alexey Oleynik on June 19, 2021, at UFC on ESPN 25. He won the bout via unanimous decision.

Spivac faced Tom Aspinall, replacing Sergei Pavlovich, on September 4, 2021, at UFC Fight Night 191. He lost the fight via technical knockout in round one.

Spivac was scheduled to face Greg Hardy, replacing Aleksei Oleinik, on January 22, 2022, at UFC 270. However, just a week before the event Hardy withdrew due to a finger injury and the bout was removed from the event. The pair was moved to UFC 272. Spivac won the fight via technical knockout in round one.

Spivac faced Augusto Sakai on August 6, 2022, at UFC on ESPN 40. He won the fight via technical knockout in round two.

Spivac was expected to face Derrick Lewis in the main event of UFC Fight Night 215 on November 19, 2022. However, Lewis was forced to pull out of the event due to non-COVID, non-weight cutting illness and the bout was cancelled. The pair was rescheduled for UFC Fight Night 218 on February 4, 2023. Spivac won the fight via an arm-triangle choke in round one. This win earned Spivac his first Performance of the Night bonus award.

Spivac faced Ciryl Gane on September 2, 2023, at UFC Fight Night 226. He lost the fight via technical knockout in the second round.

Spivac faced Marcin Tybura in a rematch on August 10, 2024, at UFC on ESPN 61. He won the fight via an armbar submission in the first round. This fight earned him another Performance of the Night award.

Spivac faced Jailton Almeida on January 18, 2025, at UFC 311. He lost the fight by technical knockout at the end of the first round.

Spivac was scheduled to face Shamil Gaziev on May 17, 2025, at UFC Fight Night 256. However, for unknown reasons, their bout was moved to UFC 316 on June 7, 2025. In turn, Gaziev pulled out due to a broken finger and was replaced by Waldo Cortes-Acosta. He lost the bout via unanimous decision. 10 out of 13 media outlets scored the bout for Spivac.

The bout between Spivac and Gaziev has been re-scheduled to take place on November 22, 2025, at UFC Fight Night 265. However, Spivac withdrew from the bout for unknown reasons and was replaced by Waldo Cortes-Acosta.

Spivac was scheduled to face Ante Delija on February 1, 2026 at UFC 325. However, the bout was moved to February 21, 2026 at UFC Fight Night 267 for unknown reasons. Spivac won the fight by unanimous decision.

Spivac faced Vitor Petrino on August 22, 2026 at UFC Fight Night 285. He lost the fight via unanimous decision.

Spivac is scheduled to face Mário Pinto 5 December 5, 2026 at UFC Fight Night 295.

== Personal life ==
Spivac and his wife Marina have a daughter who was born in 2020. Spivac's father died in 2025.

== Championships and accomplishments ==
=== Mixed martial arts ===
- Ultimate Fighting Championship
  - Performance of the Night (Two times) vs. Derrick Lewis and Marcin Tybura
  - Third most takedowns landed in UFC Heavyweight division history (32)
  - Second highest takedown accuracy percentage in UFC Heavyweight division history (59.3%)
- World Warriors Fighting Championship
  - WWFC Heavyweight Championship (One time)
    - Two successful title defenses

== Mixed martial arts record ==
Professional record breakdown
25 matches	18 wins	7 losses
By knockout	7	4
By submission	8	0
By decision	3	3

Res.	Record	Opponent	Method	Event	Date	Round	Time	Location	Notes
Loss	18–7	Vitor Petrino	Decision (unanimous)	UFC Fight Night: Hernandez vs. Rodrigues	August 22, 2026	3	5:00	Sacramento, California, United States	
Win	18–6	Ante Delija	Decision (unanimous)	UFC Fight Night: Strickland vs. Hernandez	February 21, 2026	3	5:00	Houston, Texas, United States	
Loss	17–6	Waldo Cortes-Acosta	Decision (unanimous)	UFC 316	June 7, 2025	3	5:00	Newark, New Jersey, United States	
Loss	17–5	Jailton Almeida	TKO (punches)	UFC 311	January 18, 2025	1	4:53	Inglewood, California, United States	
Win	17–4	Marcin Tybura	Submission (armbar)	UFC on ESPN: Tybura vs. Spivac 2	August 10, 2024	1	1:44	Las Vegas, Nevada, United States	Performance of the Night.
Loss	16–4	Ciryl Gane	TKO (punches)	UFC Fight Night: Gane vs. Spivac	September 2, 2023	2	3:44	Paris, France	
Win	16–3	Derrick Lewis	Submission (arm-triangle choke)	UFC Fight Night: Lewis vs. Spivac	February 4, 2023	1	3:05	Las Vegas, Nevada, United States	Performance of the Night.
Win	15–3	Augusto Sakai	TKO (punches)	UFC on ESPN: Santos vs. Hill	August 6, 2022	2	3:42	Las Vegas, Nevada, United States	
Win	14–3	Greg Hardy	TKO (punches)	UFC 272	March 5, 2022	1	2:16	Las Vegas, Nevada, United States	
Loss	13–3	Tom Aspinall	TKO (elbow and punches)	UFC Fight Night: Brunson vs. Till	September 4, 2021	1	2:30	Las Vegas, Nevada, United States	
Win	13–2	Aleksei Oleinik	Decision (unanimous)	UFC on ESPN: The Korean Zombie vs. Ige	June 19, 2021	3	5:00	Las Vegas, Nevada, United States	
Win	12–2	Jared Vanderaa	TKO (punches)	UFC Fight Night: Blaydes vs. Lewis	February 20, 2021	2	4:32	Las Vegas, Nevada, United States	
Win	11–2	Carlos Felipe	Decision (majority)	UFC Fight Night: Figueiredo vs. Benavidez 2	July 19, 2020	3	5:00	Abu Dhabi, United Arab Emirates	
Loss	10–2	Marcin Tybura	Decision (unanimous)	UFC Fight Night: Benavidez vs. Figueiredo	February 29, 2020	3	5:00	Norfolk, Virginia, United States	
Win	10–1	Tai Tuivasa	Technical Submission (arm-triangle choke)	UFC 243	October 5, 2019	2	3:14	Melbourne, Australia	
Loss	9–1	Walt Harris	TKO (punches)	UFC Fight Night: Iaquinta vs. Cowboy	May 4, 2019	1	0:50	Ottawa, Ontario, Canada	
Win	9–0	Tony Lopez	Submission (neck crank)	World Warriors FC 12	September 29, 2018	1	4:12	Kyiv, Ukraine	Defended the WWFC Heavyweight Championship.
Win	8–0	Ivo Cuk	TKO (punches)	World Warriors FC 10	March 24, 2018	1	2:21	Kyiv, Ukraine	Defended the WWFC Heavyweight Championship.
Win	7–0	Travis Fulton	Submission (rear-naked choke)	World Warriors FC 7	June 14, 2017	1	2:50	Kyiv, Ukraine	Won the vacant WWFC Heavyweight Championship.
Win	6–0	Luke Morton	KO (punches)	World Warriors FC 6	March 29, 2017	1	0:40	Kyiv, Ukraine	
Win	5–0	Artem Cherkov	KO (head kick)	Eagles FC 1	February 27, 2016	1	1:52	Chișinău, Moldova	
Win	4–0	Dimitriy Mikutsa	Submission (armbar)	N1 Pro: Nomad MMA 7	October 4, 2015	2	4:34	Karaganda, Kazakhstan	
Win	3–0	Yuri Gorbenko	Submission (armbar)	World Warriors FC: Ukraine Selection 4	January 31, 2015	1	3:38	Kyiv, Ukraine	
Win	2–0	Evgeniy Bova	Submission (kimura)	World Warriors FC: Ukraine Selection 1	November 19, 2014	1	N/A	Lviv, Ukraine	
Win	1–0	Andrey Serebrianikov	TKO (punches)	Real Fight Promotion 17	September 28, 2014	1	4:31	Lviv, Ukraine	Heavyweight debut.

== See also ==
- List of current UFC fighters
- List of male mixed martial artists
