= UFC Fight Night: Hooker vs. Parnasse =

Mixed martial arts event in 2026

- The poster for UFC Fight Night: Hooker vs. Parnasse
- Promotion: Ultimate Fighting Championship
- Date: September 5, 2026
- Venue: Accor Arena
- City: Paris, France
- Attendance: 15,687
- Total gate: $4,365,335

Event chronology
UFC Fight Night: Nurmagomedov vs. Song	UFC Fight Night: Hooker vs. Parnasse	UFC Fight Night: Silva vs. Delgado

UFC Fight Night: Hooker vs. Parnasse (also known as UFC Fight Night 287) was a mixed martial arts event produced by the Ultimate Fighting Championship that took place on September 5, 2026, at the Accor Arena in Paris, France.

== Background ==
The event marked the promotion's fifth consecutive annual visit to Paris and first since UFC Fight Night: Imavov vs. Borralho in September 2025.

A lightweight bout between Dan Hooker and former two-time KSW Featherweight and one-time KSW Lightweight Champion Salahdine Parnasse (who was also a promotional newcomer) headlined the event.

A featherweight bout between Nathaniel Wood and The Ultimate Fighter: Team Grasso vs. Team Shevchenko featherweight winner Mairon Santos was scheduled for the event. However, Santos was forced to withdraw due to an unspecified health issue and was replaced by promotional newcomer Pavel Andrusca.

== Results ==
Main card (Paramount+)
Weight class				Method	Round	Time	Notes
Lightweight	Salahdine Parnasse	def.	Dan Hooker	TKO (body kick and punches)	1	2:35
Lightweight	Axel Sola	def.	Farès Ziam	KO (punch)	1	1:40
Middleweight	Michael Page	def.	Nursulton Ruziboev	Decision (unanimous) (29–28, 29–28, 29–28)	3	5:00
Welterweight	Daniil Donchenko	def.	Punahele Soriano	Decision (unanimous) (30–27, 30–27, 29–28)	3	5:00
Featherweight	Kurtis Campbell	def.	Trevor Peek	Submission (face crank)	3	3:07
Featherweight	Losene Keita	def.	Muhammad Naimov	KO (punch)	1	2:54
Preliminary card (Paramount+)
Featherweight	Felipe Lima	def.	Morgan Charrière	Decision (unanimous) (30–27, 30–27, 29–28)	3	5:00
Heavyweight	Mário Pinto	def.	Ryan Spann	TKO (punches)	2	0:55
Light Heavyweight	Modestas Bukauskas	def.	Oumar Sy	TKO (knee and punches)	2	3:57
Featherweight	Pavel Andrusca	def.	Nathaniel Wood	Decision (unanimous) (30–27, 30–27, 29–28)	3	5:00
Flyweight	Fabià Sintes	def.	Michael Aljarouj	Decision (unanimous) (29–28, 29–28, 29–27)	3	5:00
Women's Bantamweight	Nora Cornolle	def.	Klaudia Syguła	Decision (unanimous) (30–27, 30–27, 30–27)	3	5:00
Middleweight	Matthieu Letho Duclos	def.	Luis Felipe Dias	KO (punches)	1	4:35
Women's Strawweight	Delphine Benouaich	def.	Sofia Montenegro	Technical Submission (rear-naked choke)	2	4:22

== Bonus awards ==
The following fighters received $100,000 bonuses. The other finishes received $25,000 additional bonuses.

- Fight of the Night: No bonus awarded.
- Performance of the Night: Salahdine Parnasse, Axel Sola, Losene Keita, and Mário Pinto

== See also ==
- 2026 in UFC
- List of current UFC fighters
- List of UFC events
