= UFC Fight Night: Gane vs. Spivac =

Mixed martial arts event in 2023

- The poster for UFC Fight Night: Gane vs. Spivac
- Promotion: Ultimate Fighting Championship
- Date: September 2, 2023
- Venue: Accor Arena
- City: Paris, France
- Attendance: 15,610
- Total gate: $4,000,000

Event chronology
UFC Fight Night: Holloway vs. The Korean Zombie	UFC Fight Night: Gane vs. Spivac	UFC 293: Adesanya vs. Strickland

UFC Fight Night: Gane vs. Spivac (also known as UFC Fight Night 226 and UFC on ESPN+ 84) was a mixed martial arts event produced by the Ultimate Fighting Championship that took place on September 2, 2023, at the Accor Arena in Paris, France.

== Background ==
The event marked the promotion's second visit to France and first since the country's much anticipated debut at UFC Fight Night: Gane vs. Tuivasa in September 2022.

The event was headlined by a heavyweight bout between former interim UFC Heavyweight Champion Ciryl Gane and Serghei Spivac.

A women's bantamweight bout between Zarah Fairn and Hailey Cowan was scheduled for the event. However on August 6, Cowan was forced out of the event due to an injury. She was replaced by promotional newcomer and the LFA Women's Bantamweight Champion Jacqueline Cavalcanti.

A light heavyweight bout between former UFC Light Heavyweight Championship challenger Volkan Oezdemir and Azamat Murzakanov was expected to take place at the event. However, Murzakanov pulled out in early August for unknown reasons and was replaced by promotional newcomer Bogdan Guskov.

A lightweight bout between Nasrat Haqparast and Sam Patterson was expected to take place at the event. However, Patterson pulled out due to health issues. A replacement was found in promotional newcomer Landon Quinones and set for the following week at UFC 293.

A pair of bantamweight bouts featuring Taylor Lapilus vs. Muin Gafurov and Caolán Loughran vs. Yanis Ghemmouri were expected to take place at the event. However, Lapilus was instead matched up with Loughran after Gafurov withdrew due to visa issues. Ghemmouri was instead matched up with William Gomis in a featherweight bout after his original opponent Lucas Almeida withdrew due to injury.

== Results ==
Main card (ESPN+)
Weight class				Method	Round	Time	Notes
Heavyweight	Ciryl Gane	def.	Serghei Spivac	TKO (punches)	2	3:44
Women's Flyweight	Manon Fiorot	def.	Rose Namajunas	Decision (unanimous) (30–27, 29–28, 29–28)	3	5:00
Lightweight	Benoît Saint Denis	def.	Thiago Moisés	TKO (punches)	2	4:44
Light Heavyweight	Volkan Oezdemir	def.	Bogdan Guskov	Submission (rear-naked choke)	1	3:46
Featherweight	William Gomis	def.	Yanis Ghemmouri	TKO (body kick)	3	2:20	(Note: The referee called a timeout after Ghemmouri claimed to have been hit with a low blow, however upon review by ringside officials the strike was deemed to be legal, and the fight was subsequently declared a TKO win for Gomis.)
Featherweight	Morgan Charrière	def.	Manolo Zecchini	KO (body kick and punches)	1	3:51
Preliminary card (ESPN+)
Bantamweight	Taylor Lapilus	def.	Caolán Loughran	Decision (unanimous) (29–28, 29–28, 29–28)	3	5:00
Welterweight	Ange Loosa	def.	Rhys McKee	Decision (unanimous) (30–27, 29–28, 29–28)	3	5:00
Women's Bantamweight	Nora Cornolle	def.	Joselyne Edwards	Decision (unanimous) (30–27, 30–27, 29–28)	3	5:00
Bantamweight	Farid Basharat	def.	Kleydson Rodrigues	Submission (arm-triangle choke)	1	4:15
Catchweight (140 lb)	Jacqueline Cavalcanti	def.	Zarah Fairn	Decision (unanimous) (30–27, 30–27, 30–27)	3	5:00

== Bonus awards ==
The following fighters received $50,000 bonuses.

- Fight of the Night: Benoît Saint Denis vs. Thiago Moisés
- Performance of the Night: Ciryl Gane and Morgan Charrière

== See also ==
- List of UFC events
- List of current UFC fighters
- 2023 in UFC
