= UFC Fight Night: Tuivasa vs. Tybura =

2024 mixed martial event in Nevada, US

- The poster for UFC Fight Night: Tuivasa vs. Tybura
- Promotion: Ultimate Fighting Championship
- Date: March 16, 2024
- Venue: UFC Apex
- City: Enterprise, Nevada, United States
- Attendance: Not announced

Event chronology
UFC 299: O'Malley vs. Vera 2	UFC Fight Night: Tuivasa vs. Tybura	UFC on ESPN: Ribas vs. Namajunas

UFC Fight Night: Tuivasa vs. Tybura (also known as UFC Fight Night 239, UFC on ESPN+ 97 and UFC Vegas 88) was a mixed martial arts event produced by the Ultimate Fighting Championship that took place on March 16, 2024, at the UFC Apex in Enterprise, Nevada, part of the Las Vegas Valley, United States.

== Background ==
A heavyweight bout between Tai Tuivasa and Marcin Tybura was scheduled for UFC 298. However, the bout was moved in order to headline this event.

A bantamweight bout between Charalampos Grigoriou and Toshiomi Kazama was expected to take place at the event. However, Kazama pulled out and was replaced by Chad Anheliger.

Thiago Moisés and Brad Riddell were expected to meet in a lightweight bout at the event. However, Riddell pulled out in mid-February due to undisclosed reasons. He was replaced by promotional newcomer Mitch Ramirez.

At the weigh-ins, three fighters missed weight:

- Natan Levy weighed in at 156.5 pounds, half a pound over the lightweight non-title fight limit.
- Chelsea Chandler weighed in at 137 pounds, one pound over the bantamweight non-title fight limit.
- Danny Silva weighed in at 148.5 pounds, two and a half pounds over the featherweight non-title fight limit.

All three bouts proceeded at catchweight. Each fighter was fined 20% of their individual purses which went to their opponents Mike Davis, Josiane Nunes, and Joshua Culibao respectively.

== Results ==
Main card (ESPN+)
Weight class				Method	Round	Time	Notes
Heavyweight	Marcin Tybura	def.	Tai Tuivasa	Technical Submission (rear-naked choke)	1	4:08
Welterweight	Bryan Battle	vs.	Ange Loosa	No Contest (accidental eye poke)	2	1:00	(Note: Accidental eye poke rendered Loosa unable to continue.)
Light Heavyweight	Ovince Saint Preux	def.	Kennedy Nzechukwu	Decision (split) (29–28, 28–29, 29–28)	3	5:00
Featherweight	Christian Rodriguez	def.	Isaac Dulgarian	Decision (split) (27–28, 28–27, 28–27)	3	5:00
Women's Bantamweight	Macy Chiasson	def.	Pannie Kianzad	Submission (rear-naked choke)	1	3:54
Middleweight	Gerald Meerschaert	def.	Bryan Barberena	Technical Submission (face crank)	2	4:23
Preliminary card (ESPN+)
Catchweight (156.5 lb)	Mike Davis	def.	Natan Levy	Submission (arm-triangle choke)	2	1:43
Catchweight (137 lb)	Chelsea Chandler	def.	Josiane Nunes	Decision (unanimous) (29–28, 29–28, 29–28)	3	5:00
Flyweight	Jafel Filho	def.	Ode' Osbourne	Submission (rear-naked choke)	1	4:27
Catchweight (148.5 lb)	Danny Silva	def.	Joshua Culibao	Decision (split) (29–28, 28–29, 29–28)	3	5:00
Women's Strawweight	Jaqueline Amorim	def.	Cory McKenna	Submission (armbar)	1	1:38
Lightweight	Thiago Moisés	def.	Mitch Ramirez	TKO (leg kicks)	3	0:15
Bantamweight	Chad Anheliger	def.	Charalampos Grigoriou	Decision (unanimous) (30–27, 29–28, 29–28)	3	5:00

== Bonus awards ==
The following fighters received $50,000 bonuses.

- Fight of the Night: No bonus awarded.
- Performance of the Night: Marcin Tybura, Macy Chiasson, Jafel Filho, and Jaqueline Amorim

== See also ==
- 2024 in UFC
- List of current UFC fighters
- List of UFC events
