= Farid Basharat =

British mixed martial artist

- Born: 2 August 1997 (age 29); Paktia Province, Afghanistan
- Native name: فرید بشارت
- Other names: Ferocious
- Height: 5 ft 8 in (173 cm)
- Weight: 135 lb (61 kg; 9 st 9 lb)
- Division: Bantamweight; Featherweight
- Reach: 71 in (180 cm)
- Stance: Orthodox
- Fighting out of: London, England
- Team: Xtreme Couture
- Years active: 2016–present

Mixed martial arts record
- Total: 16
- Wins: 16
- By knockout: 1
- By submission: 6
- By decision: 9
- Losses: 0

Other information
- Notable relatives: Javid Basharat (brother)
- Mixed martial arts record from Sherdog

Farid Basharat (Pashto: فرید بشارت; born 2 August 1997) is an Afghan-born British mixed martial artist who competed in the Bantamweight division of the Ultimate Fighting Championship (UFC).

== Background ==
Farid and his older brother Javid, who is a PFL fighter, arrived in England from Afghanistan with his mother as a refugee child, where they rejoined their father. The bantamweight siblings have been in a perpetual competition with one another since their early childhood days.

== Mixed martial arts career ==
=== Early career ===
Basharat maintained an undefeated record fighting mostly on the English regional scene, starting out with his debut unanimous decision win over Camilo Petkoff at "FightStar Championship 14" in April 2018. He continued with victories via submissions, decisions, and a KO in the next 7 bouts.

Basharat was invited to compete at Dana White's Contender Series Season 6, where he faced Allan Begosso. He won the bout via unanimous decision and earned a UFC contract in the process.

=== Ultimate Fighting Championship ===
In his UFC debut Basharat faced Da’Mon Blackshear at UFC 285 on 4 March 2023. He won the bout via unanimous decision, which was held in Las Vegas.

Basharat faced Kleydson Rodrigues at UFC Fight Night 226 on 2 September 2023. He won the bout via arm-triangle choke in the first round.

Farid faced Taylor Lapilus on 13 January 2024 at UFC Vegas 84. He won the bout via unanimous decision.

Farid was scheduled to face Montel Jackson on 22 June 2024 at UFC on ABC 6. However, Basharat was unable to compete due to an injury so the bout was scrapped.

Farid faced Victor Hugo in a featherweight bout on 26 October 2024 at UFC 308. The bout was originally scheduled for bantamweight, but was changed to a featherweight bout after Hugo missed weight by 10 pounds. He won the fight by unanimous decision.

Basharat faced Chris Gutiérrez 4 October 2025, at UFC 320. He won the fight by unanimous decision.

Basharat faced Jean Matsumoto at UFC Fight Night 266 on 7 February 2026. He won the fight by split decision.

Basharat was scheduled to face Ethyn Ewing on 20 June 2026, at UFC Fight Night 279. However, for undisclosed reasons, the bout was moved to July 11, 2026 which will take place at UFC 329. In turn, Ewing had to withdraw for undisclosed reasons and was replaced by promotional newcomer John Garza. Basharat won the fight by unanimous decision.

On October 15, 2026, it was reported that Basharat completed his fight contract and was not re-signed by the UFC, despite having amassed a 7–0 record in the promotion.

== Mixed martial arts record ==
Professional record breakdown
16 matches	16 wins	0 losses
By knockout	1	0
By submission	6	0
By decision	9	0

Res.	Record	Opponent	Method	Event	Date	Round	Time	Location	Notes
Win	16–0	John Garza	Decision (unanimous)	UFC 329	11 July 2026	3	5:00	Las Vegas, Nevada, United States	
Win	15–0	Jean Matsumoto	Decision (split)	UFC Fight Night: Bautista vs. Oliveira	7 February 2026	3	5:00	Las Vegas, Nevada, United States	
Win	14–0	Chris Gutiérrez	Decision (unanimous)	UFC 320	4 October 2025	3	5:00	Las Vegas, Nevada, United States	
Win	13–0	Victor Hugo	Decision (unanimous)	UFC 308	26 October 2024	3	5:00	Abu Dhabi, United Arab Emirates	Featherweight bout.
Win	12–0	Taylor Lapilus	Decision (unanimous)	UFC Fight Night: Ankalaev vs. Walker 2	13 January 2024	3	5:00	Las Vegas, Nevada, United States	
Win	11–0	Kleydson Rodrigues	Submission (arm-triangle choke)	UFC Fight Night: Gane vs. Spivac	2 September 2023	1	4:15	Paris, France	
Win	10–0	Da'Mon Blackshear	Decision (unanimous)	UFC 285	4 March 2023	3	5:00	Las Vegas, Nevada, United States	
Win	9–0	Allan Begosso	Decision (unanimous)	Dana White's Contender Series 54	13 September 2022	3	5:00	Las Vegas, Nevada, United States	
Win	8–0	Raul Guzman	Submission (rear-naked choke)	War of Titans 2	12 March 2022	2	4:58	Madrid, Spain	Catchweight (140 lb) bout.
Win	7–0	Janne Elonen-Kulmala	Submission (rear-naked choke)	Oktagon 26	24 July 2021	3	3:12	Prague, Czech Republic	
Win	6–0	Marco Zannetti	Decision (unanimous)	Contenders Norwich 29	15 February 2020	3	5:00	Norwich, England	Return to Bantamweight.
Win	5–0	Nicolae Mezdrea	Submission (rear-naked choke)	FightStar Championship 19	14 December 2019	2	2:31	London, England	
Win	4–0	Stuart Eskine	KO (head kick)	Ultimate Challenge MMA 60	8 September 2019	1	0:11	London, England	
Win	3–0	Sam Steward	Submission (rear-naked choke)	Ultimate Challenge MMA 59	11 May 2019	1	0:11	London, England	Featherweight debut.
Win	2–0	Cheya Saleem	Submission (rear-naked choke)	Ultimate Challenge MMA 57	10 November 2018	3	0:18	London, England	
Win	1–0	Camilo Petkoff	Decision (unanimous)	FightStar Championship 14	14 April 2018	3	5:00	London, England	Bantamweight debut.

== See also ==
- List of Dana White's Contender Series alumni
- List of male mixed martial artists
- List of undefeated mixed martial artists
