= UFC Fight Night: Gane vs. Tuivasa =

Mixed martial arts event in 2022

- The poster for UFC Fight Night: Gane vs. Tuivasa
- Promotion: Ultimate Fighting Championship
- Date: September 3, 2022
- Venue: Accor Arena
- City: Paris, France
- Attendance: 15,405
- Total gate: $3,242,837

Event chronology
UFC 278: Usman vs. Edwards 2	UFC Fight Night: Gane vs. Tuivasa	UFC 279: Diaz vs. Ferguson

UFC Fight Night: Gane vs. Tuivasa (also known as UFC Fight Night 209 and UFC on ESPN+ 67) was a mixed martial arts event produced by the Ultimate Fighting Championship that took place on September 3, 2022, at Accor Arena in Paris, France.

== Background ==
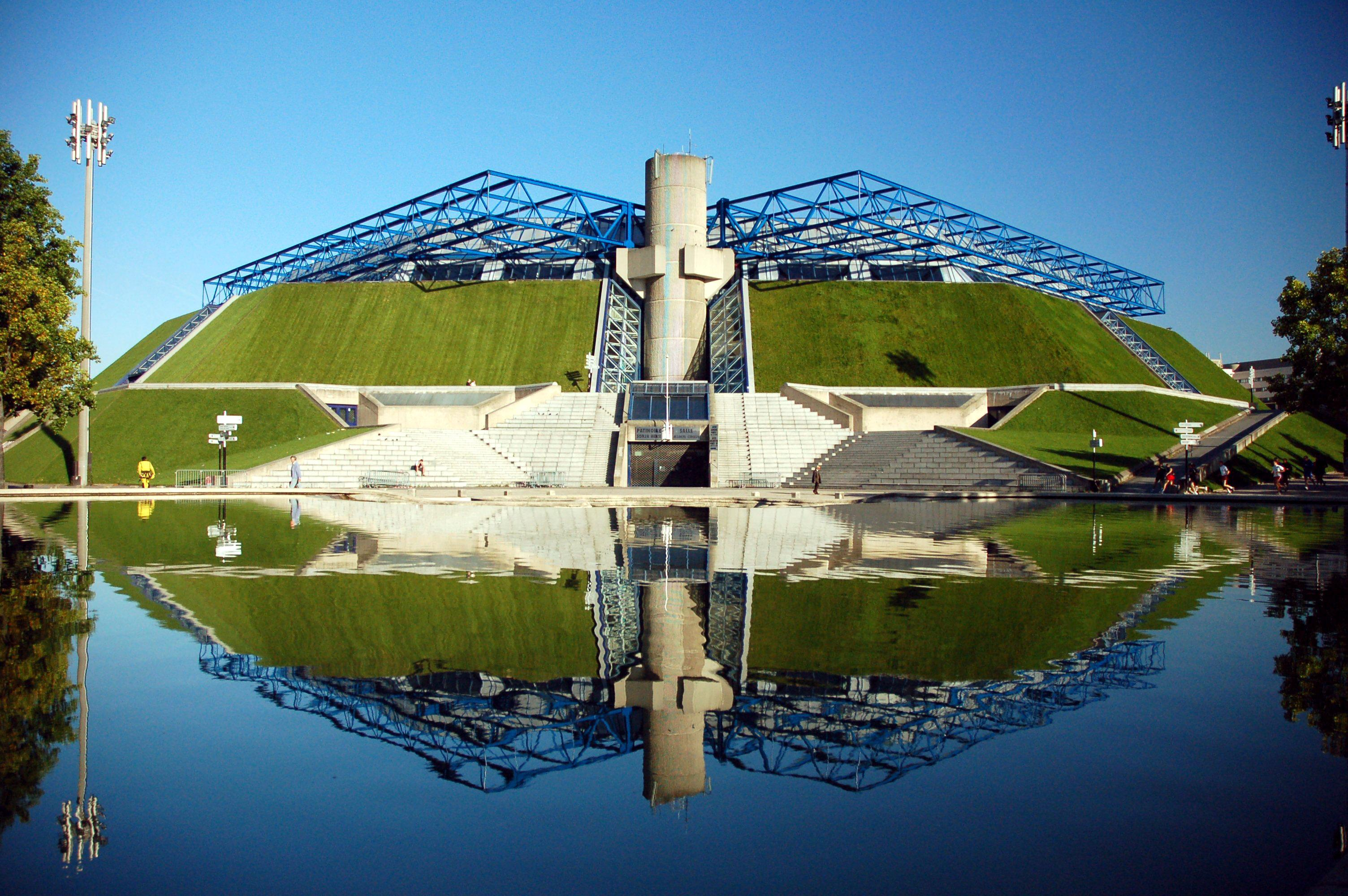
Accor Arena hosted the UFC's much anticipated debut in France.

This event marked the organization's debut in France. After a long political battle, mixed martial arts was legalized in the country in 2020 after the French National Olympic and Sports Committee gave its approval to the French Ministry of Sport's decision to allow it under the jurisdiction of the French Boxing Federation.

A heavyweight bout between former interim UFC Heavyweight Champion Ciryl Gane and Tai Tuivasa headlined the event.

A middleweight bout between former UFC Middleweight Champion Robert Whittaker (also The Ultimate Fighter: The Smashes welterweight winner) and former title challenger Marvin Vettori took place at the event. The pairing was originally scheduled for UFC 275, but Whittaker withdrew due to injury.

Former UFC Women's Flyweight Championship challenger Katlyn Chookagian was expected to face Manon Fiorot in a women's flyweight bout at the event. However, Chookagian withdrew for unknown reasons in mid June and was replaced by former UFC Women's Strawweight Champion Jéssica Andrade. In turn, Andrade withdrew in mid July due to undisclosed reasons and Chookagian stepped back into the original pairing. The promotion then opted to postpone the contest to UFC 280 in October.

Christos Giagos was expected to face Benoît Saint Denis in a lightweight bout. However, Giagos pulled out in early August after severing a tendon of his little finger during a domestic accident. Saint Denis faced Gabriel Miranda instead.

A welterweight bout between Darian Weeks (MMA record: 5–2) and former two-time Glory Welterweight Champion Cédric Doumbé (MMA record: 2–0) was scheduled for the event. However the fight was cancelled after the French MMA Federation (FMMAF) would not sanction the bout per the commission's rule that fighters with less than ten professional bouts must not have more than a four fight differential between them. Weeks was later rescheduled to face Yohan Lainesse at UFC 279, one week later from this event. Doumbé was then supposedly released by the organization, a rumor he denies.

A middleweight bout between Makhmud Muradov and Abusupiyan Magomedov was expected to take place at the event. However, Muradov withdrew due to injury was replaced by Dustin Stoltzfus.

A bantamweight bout between Taylor Lapilus and Khalid Taha was expected to take place at this event. However, the week before the event, Lapilus withdrew due to a broken hand. Taha faced former Ultimate Warrior Challenge Mexico bantamweight champion and promotional newcomer Cristian Quiñónez instead.

Zarah Fairn Dos Santos and Ailín Pérez were scheduled to meet in a women's featherweight bout at the event. However, Fairn was pulled from the event for unknown reasons and replaced by Stephanie Egger.

A featherweight bout between Ricardo Ramos and Danny Henry was expected to take place at the event. However, the bout was cancelled after both fighters got injured.

== Results ==
Main card (ESPN+)
Weight class				Method	Round	Time	Notes
Heavyweight	Ciryl Gane	def.	Tai Tuivasa	KO (punches)	3	4:23
Middleweight	Robert Whittaker	def.	Marvin Vettori	Decision (unanimous) (30–27, 30–27, 29–28)	3	5:00
Middleweight	Nassourdine Imavov	def.	Joaquin Buckley	Decision (unanimous) (29–28, 29–28, 30–27)	3	5:00
Middleweight	Roman Kopylov	def.	Alessio Di Chirico	KO (punches)	3	1:09
Featherweight	William Gomis	def.	Jarno Errens	Decision (majority) (29–28, 29–28, 29–29)	3	5:00
Featherweight	Nathaniel Wood	def.	Charles Jourdain	Decision (unanimous) (30–27, 30–27, 29–28)	3	5:00
Preliminary card (ESPN+)
Middleweight	Abusupiyan Magomedov	def.	Dustin Stoltzfus	KO (front kick and punches)	1	0:19
Lightweight	Nasrat Haqparast	def.	John Makdessi	Decision (unanimous) (30–27, 30–27, 29–28)	3	5:00
Lightweight	Farès Ziam	def.	Michal Figlak	Decision (unanimous) (30–27, 30–27, 29–28)	3	5:00
Lightweight	Benoît Saint Denis	def.	Gabriel Miranda	TKO (punches)	2	0:16
Bantamweight	Cristian Quiñónez	def.	Khalid Taha	TKO (punches)	1	3:15
Women's Featherweight	Stephanie Egger	def.	Ailín Pérez	Submission (rear-naked choke)	2	4:54

== Bonus awards ==
The following fighters received $50,000 bonuses.

- Fight of the Night: Ciryl Gane vs. Tai Tuivasa
- Performance of the Night: Abusupiyan Magomedov and Benoît Saint Denis

== See also ==
- List of UFC events
- List of current UFC fighters
- 2022 in UFC
