= Steve Garcia =

American mixed martial arts fighter

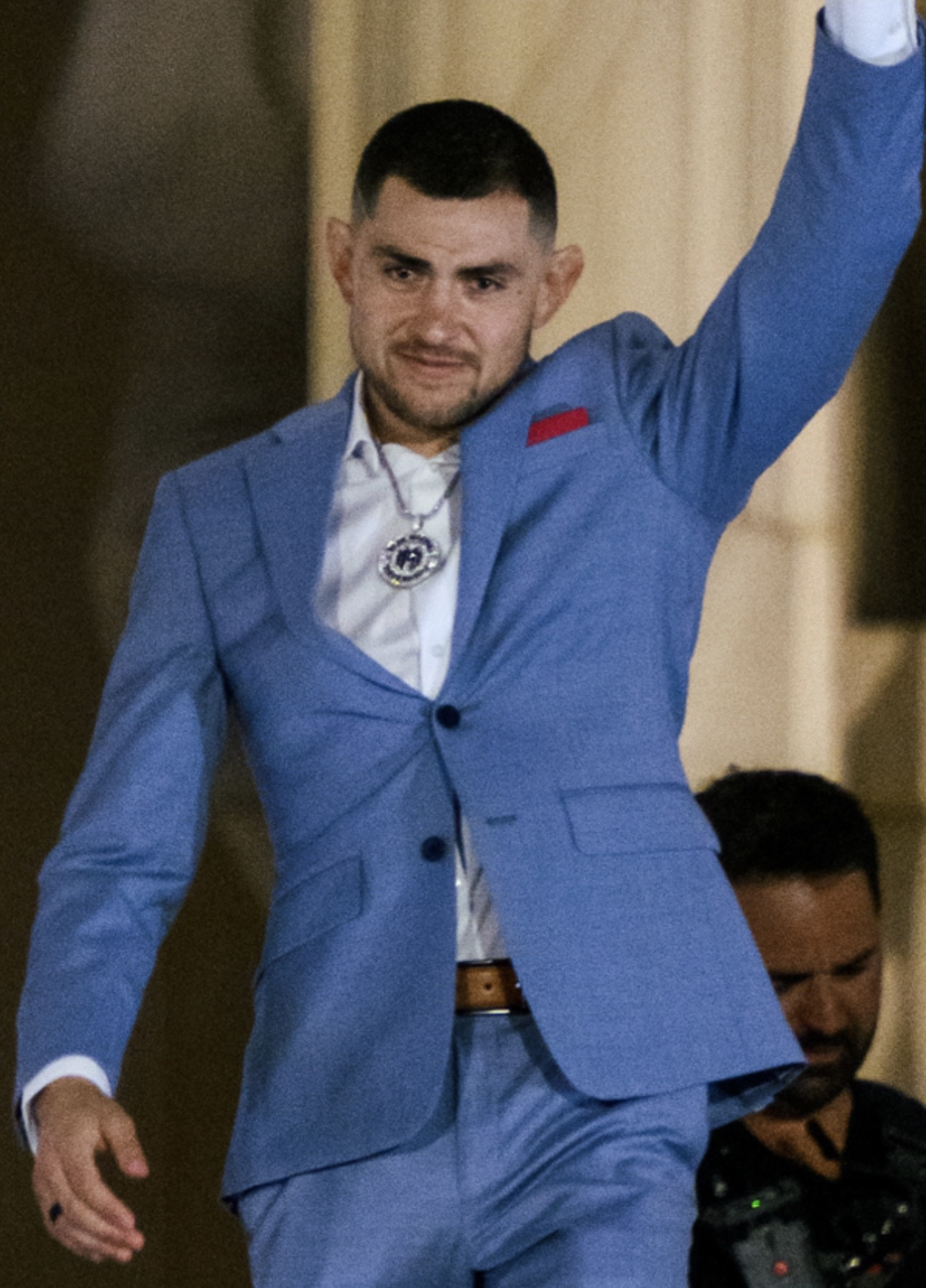
- Garcia in 2026
- Born: Estevan M. Garcia Jr. May 22, 1992 (age 34); Albuquerque, New Mexico, U.S.
- Other names: Mean Machine
- Height: 6 ft 0 in (1.83 m)
- Weight: 145 lb (66 kg; 10.4 st)
- Division: Lightweight; Featherweight; Bantamweight
- Reach: 75 in (190 cm)
- Fighting out of: Rio Rancho, New Mexico, U.S.
- Team: Jackson Wink
- Years active: 2013–present

Mixed martial arts record
- Total: 25
- Wins: 19
- By knockout: 15
- By decision: 4
- Losses: 6
- By knockout: 2
- By submission: 1
- By decision: 3

Other information
- Mixed martial arts record from Sherdog

Estevan M. Garcia Jr. (born May 22, 1992), known as Steve Garcia, is an American professional mixed martial artist who currently competes in the Featherweight division of the Ultimate Fighting Championship (UFC). A professional since 2013, he has previously competed in Bellator's bantamweight division. As of November 14, 2026, he is #12 in the Meta UFC featherweight rankings.

== Background ==
Inspired by his friends, Garcia initially started training mixed martial arts at Greg Jackson's satellite gym at the age of 15. He then went on to train jiu-jitsu and kickboxing at Luttrell's MMA before moving to Jackson-Wink MMA Academy.

Garcia is of Mexican descent.

== Mixed martial arts career ==
=== Bellator MMA ===
Garcia was expected to make his Bellator debut against Shawn Bunch at Bellator 97 on July 31, 2013, but he withdrew due to injury and was replaced by Russell Wilson. The bout with Bunch was later rescheduled for Bellator 105 on October 25, 2013, where Garcia won via TKO in the third round.

After signing a new deal with the promotion, Garcia faced Cody Walker at Bellator 121 on June 6, 2014, and secured a knockout victory just 39 seconds into the first round. He next fought Kin Moy at Bellator 123 on September 5, 2014, winning by split decision.

Garcia continued his momentum with a first-round TKO win over Eduardo Bustillos at Bellator 143 on September 25, 2015. However, at Bellator 151 on March 4, 2016, he suffered the first loss of his professional career, dropping a split decision to Ricky Turcios.

He rebounded with a unanimous decision win over Ronnie Lawrence at Bellator 162 on October 21, 2016. Garcia was then scheduled to face Joe Taimanglo at Bellator 174 on March 3, 2017, but the bout was removed from the card after Taimanglo missed weight.

Garcia returned at Bellator 181 on July 14, 2017, where he lost to veteran Joe Warren by unanimous decision. On February 20, 2018, it was announced that Bellator had released Garcia from the promotion.

=== Contender Series ===
Garcia appeared on Dana White's Contender Series 25, where he faced Desmond Torres. He won the bout via first-round TKO, but was not awarded a UFC contract due to missing weight.

=== Legacy Fighting Alliance ===
Following his appearance on the Contender Series, Garcia signed with Legacy Fighting Alliance. He made his promotional debut against Jose Mariscal, earning a second-round TKO victory.

=== Ultimate Fighting Championship ===
Garcia made his UFC debut on February 29, 2020, at UFC Fight Night 169, stepping in to replace Alex Muñoz against Luis Peña. He lost the bout via unanimous decision.

He was next scheduled to face Peter Barrett at UFC Fight Night 174 on August 8, 2020, but withdrew from the fight on July 25 for undisclosed reasons.Youssef Zalal tepped in as his replacement.

Garcia was booked to fight Charles Jourdain on March 13, 2021 at UFC Fight Night 187, but withdrew for unknown reasons. Marcelo Rojo took his place on the card.

Returning to action, Garcia faced Charlie Ontiveros on October 9, 2021 at UFC Fight Night 194, securing a second-round technical knockout victory.

He was scheduled to fight Damir Hadžović at UFC Fight Night 205 on April 23, 2022, but the bout was cancelled due to Hadžović experiencing visa issues.

Garcia then competed against Hayisaer Maheshate on June 11, 2022 at UFC 275, where he suffered a first-round knockout loss.

On October 29, 2022, Garcia rebounded with a first-round TKO win over Chase Hooper at UFC Fight Night 213, He won the fight via TKO in the first round. earning his first Performance of the Night bonus.

At UFC 287 on April 8, 2023, Garcia faced Shayilan Nuerdanbieke. Despite being knocked down early, he rallied to win via second-round TKO with a body kick followed by ground and pound.

Garcia was slated to fight Sean Woodson at UFC on ESPN 50 on August 5, 2023, but withdrew due to injury. He was then scheduled to face Melquizael Costa on December 2, 2023, at UFC on ESPN 52, but pulled out the day before due to illness. The bout was rescheduled for UFC Fight Night 233 on December 9, 2023, where Garcia won by second-round knockout.

On July 20, 2024, Garcia faced Seung Woo Choi at UFC on ESPN 60, winning by first-round technical knockout and earning another Performance of the Night award.

Replacing Calvin Kattar, Garcia fought Kyle Nelson on September 7, 2024, at UFC Fight Night 242. Nelson missed weight, coming in at 148.5 pounds. As a result, the bout proceeded at catchweight, and he was fined 20 percent of his purse, which was awarded to Garcia. Garcia won via first-round TKO with elbows and punches, earning yet another Performance of the Night award.

Garcia was scheduled to face Edson Barboza on February 22, 2025, at UFC Fight Night 252, but the fight was cancelled after Barboza withdrew due to injury.

Garcia returned to face Calvin Kattar on July 12, 2025 at UFC on ESPN 70, winning the bout by unanimous decision.

Garcia faced David Onama in the main event on November 1, 2025, at UFC Fight Night 263. He won by technical knockout in the first round, handing Onama his first loss by stoppage. This fight earned him another Performance of the Night award.

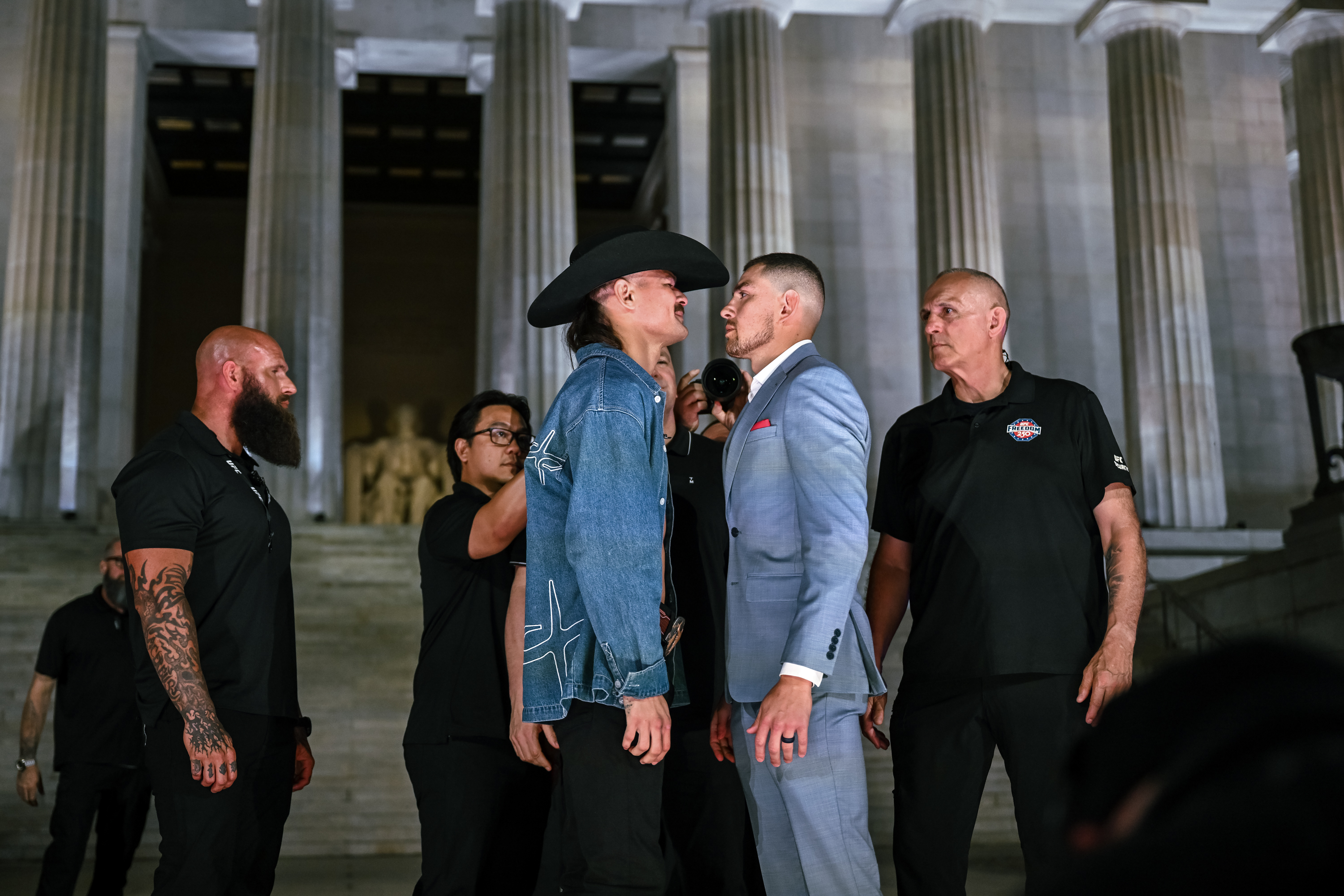
Garcia facing off with Diego Lopes at the UFC Freedom 250 press conference

Garcia faced former UFC Featherweight Championship challenger Diego Lopes on June 14, 2026 at UFC Freedom 250. He lost the fight via knockout in the second round.

Garcia was scheduled to face Yair Rodríguez on December 12, 2026 at UFC 335. However, for undisclosed reasons, the bout was moved to serve as the headliner on January 16, 2027 at UFC Fight Night 296.

== Championships and accomplishments ==
- Ultimate Fighting Championship
  - Performance of the Night (Four times) vs. Chase Hooper, Seung Woo Choi, Kyle Nelson and David Onama
  - Tied for fourth most consecutive knockouts in UFC history (5)
  - Highest knockdowns-per-fifteen minutes in UFC Featherweight division history (2.64)
  - Highest striking differential in UFC Featherweight division history (4.05)
  - Tied (Dan Ige) for sixth most knockouts in UFC Featherweight division history (5)
  - Tied (Dan Ige) for sixth most knockdowns in UFC Featherweight division history (7)
  - Sixth most significant strikes landed-per-minute in UFC Featherweight division history (6.36)
  - Second shortest average fight time in UFC Featherweight division history (5:34)
- MMA Junkie
  - 2024 Under-the-Radar Fighter of the Year

== Mixed martial arts record ==
Professional record breakdown
25 matches	19 wins	6 losses
By knockout	15	2
By submission	0	1
By decision	4	3

Res.	Record	Opponent	Method	Event	Date	Round	Time	Location	Notes
Loss	19–6	Diego Lopes	KO (punches)	UFC Freedom 250	June 14, 2026	2	2:42	Washington, D.C., United States	
Win	19–5	David Onama	TKO (punches)	UFC Fight Night: Garcia vs. Onama	November 1, 2025	1	3:34	Las Vegas, Nevada, United States	Performance of the Night.
Win	18–5	Calvin Kattar	Decision (unanimous)	UFC on ESPN: Lewis vs. Teixeira	July 12, 2025	3	5:00	Nashville, Tennessee, United States	
Win	17–5	Kyle Nelson	TKO (elbows and punches)	UFC Fight Night: Burns vs. Brady	September 7, 2024	1	3:59	Las Vegas, Nevada, United States	Catchweight (148.5 lb) bout; Nelson missed weight. Performance of the Night.
Win	16–5	Choi Seung-woo	TKO (punches)	UFC on ESPN: Lemos vs. Jandiroba	July 20, 2024	1	1:36	Las Vegas, Nevada, United States	Performance of the Night.
Win	15–5	Melquizael Costa	KO (elbows)	UFC Fight Night: Song vs. Gutiérrez	December 9, 2023	2	1:01	Las Vegas, Nevada, United States	Lightweight bout.
Win	14–5	Shayilan Nuerdanbieke	KO (body kick and punches)	UFC 287	April 8, 2023	2	0:36	Miami, Florida, United States	
Win	13–5	Chase Hooper	TKO (punches)	UFC Fight Night: Kattar vs. Allen	October 29, 2022	1	1:32	Las Vegas, Nevada, United States	Return to Featherweight. Performance of the Night.
Loss	12–5	Maheshate Hayisaer	KO (punch)	UFC 275	June 11, 2022	1	1:14	Kallang, Singapore	
Win	12–4	Charlie Ontiveros	TKO (punches)	UFC Fight Night: Dern vs. Rodriguez	October 8, 2021	2	1:51	Las Vegas, Nevada, United States	
Loss	11–4	Luis Peña	Decision (unanimous)	UFC Fight Night: Benavidez vs. Figueiredo	February 29, 2020	3	5:00	Norfolk, Virginia, United States	Lightweight debut.
Win	11–3	Jose Mariscal	TKO (knee and elbows)	LFA 80	January 17, 2020	2	2:27	Albuquerque, New Mexico, United States	
Win	10–3	Desmond Torres	TKO (punches and elbows)	Dana White's Contender Series 25	August 20, 2019	1	4:35	Las Vegas, Nevada, United States	Bantamweight bout; Garcia missed weight (139 lb).
Win	9–3	Andrew Whitney	TKO (punches)	Jackson Wink Fight Night 5	May 10, 2019	1	3:27	Albuquerque, New Mexico, United States	
Win	8–3	Abel Cullum	Decision (unanimous)	Jackson Wink Fight Night 4	November 30, 2018	3	5:00	Albuquerque, New Mexico, United States	Bantamweight bout.
Loss	7–3	Aalon Cruz	Submission (rear-naked choke)	Jackson Wink Fight Night 3	June 2, 2018	1	1:47	Albuquerque, New Mexico, United States	Featherweight debut.
Loss	7–2	Joe Warren	Decision (unanimous)	Bellator 181	July 14, 2017	3	5:00	Thackerville, Oklahoma, United States	
Win	7–1	Ronnie Lawrence	Decision (unanimous)	Bellator 162	October 21, 2016	3	5:00	Memphis, Tennessee, United States	
Loss	6–1	Ricky Turcios	Decision (split)	Bellator 151	March 4, 2016	3	5:00	Thackerville, Oklahoma, United States	
Win	6–0	Eduardo Bustillos	TKO (punches)	Bellator 143	September 25, 2015	1	4:59	Hidalgo, Texas, United States	
Win	5–0	Kin Moy	Decision (split)	Bellator 123	September 5, 2014	3	5:00	Uncasville, Connecticut, United States	
Win	4–0	Cody Walker	KO (punch)	Bellator 121	June 6, 2014	1	0:39	Thackerville, Oklahoma, United States	Catchweight (140 lb) bout.
Win	3–0	Klay Guy	TKO (punches)	Triple A MMA 4	January 16, 2014	2	1:14	Fort Worth, Texas, United States	
Win	2–0	Shawn Bunch	TKO (punches)	Bellator 105	October 25, 2013	3	3:29	Rio Rancho, New Mexico, United States	
Win	1–0	Alan Lerma	TKO (punches)	Triple A MMA 1	April 28, 2013	2	1:52	Albuquerque, New Mexico, United States	Bantamweight debut.

== See also ==
- List of current UFC fighters
- List of Dana White's Contender Series alumni
- List of male mixed martial artists
