= 2022 in Legacy Fighting Alliance =

Information
- Promotion: Legacy Fighting Alliance
- First date: January 14, 2022
- Last date: December 9, 2022

Events
- Total events: 28

Fights
- Total fights: 308
- Title fights: 15

2022 was the sixth year in the history of Legacy Fighting Alliance, a mixed martial arts promotion based in the United States.

== List of events ==
| # | Event | Date | Venue | Location |
|---|---|---|---|---|
| 1 | LFA 121: Brown vs. Jones | January 14, 2022 | The Bomb Factory | Dallas, Texas, U.S. |
| 2 | LFA 122: Johnson vs. Mota | January 21, 2022 | The Factory at the District | St. Louis, Missouri, U.S. |
| 3 | LFA 123: Argueta vs. Santos | February 4, 2022 | Horseshoe Hammond | Hammond, Indiana, U.S. |
| 4 | LFA 124: Formiga vs. Bunes | February 11, 2022 | Arizona Federal Theatre | Phoenix, Arizona, U.S. |
| 5 | LFA 125: Amorim vs. Young | February 25, 2022 | Seneca Niagara Casino & Hotel | Niagara Falls, New York, U.S. |
| 6 | LFA 126: Bilharinho vs. Delano | March 11, 2022 | Complexo Ribalta | Rio de Janeiro, Brazil |
| 7 | LFA 127: Diaz vs. Assis | March 25, 2022 | Commerce Casino | Commerce, California, U.S. |
| 8 | LFA 128: McKenzie vs. Clay | April 8, 2022 | Sanford Pentagon | Sioux Falls, South Dakota, U.S. |
| 9 | LFA 129: Petersen vs. Cortes-Acosta | April 15, 2022 | Mystic Lake Casino Hotel | Prior Lake, Minnesota, U.S. |
| 10 | LFA 130: Ksiazkiewicz vs. Gambulino | April 22, 2022 | 4 Bears Casino & Lodge | New Town, North Dakota, U.S. |
| 11 | LFA 131: Argueta vs. Silva | May 6, 2022 | Oshkosh Arena | Oshkosh, Wisconsin, U.S. |
| 12 | LFA 132: Gomes vs. Costa | May 13, 2022 | Quali Stage | Rio de Janeiro, Brazil |
| 13 | LFA 133: Stack vs. Delano | June 3, 2022 | Magness Arena | Denver, Colorado, U.S. |
| 14 | LFA 134: Gafurov vs. Sousa | June 10, 2022 | Bell County Expo Center | Belton, Texas, U.S. |
| 15 | LFA 135: Leyva vs. Reis | July 8, 2022 | Arizona Federal Theatre | Phoenix, Arizona, U.S. |
| 16 | LFA 136: Rio de Janeiro vs. São Paulo | July 15, 2022 | Centro Esportivo Municipal Ubaldo Gonçalves | Caraguatatuba, Brazil |
| 17 | LFA 137: Gibson vs. Amil | July 29, 2022 | Commerce Casino | Commerce, California, U.S. |
| 18 | LFA 138: Farias vs. Tanaka | August 5, 2022 | Grand Hotel Casino & Resort | Shawnee, Oklahoma, U.S. |
| 19 | LFA 139: Assenza vs. Melo | August 19, 2022 | Seneca Niagara Resort & Casino | Niagara Falls, New York, U.S. |
| 20 | LFA 140: Mota vs. Abuev | August 26, 2022 | 4 Bears Casino & Lodge | New Town, North Dakota, U.S. |
| 21 | LFA 141: Talundžić vs. Brown | September 9, 2022 | Dobson Arena | Vail, Colorado, U.S. |
| 22 | LFA 142: Amorim vs. Nichols | September 16, 2022 | Mystic Lake Casino Hotel | Prior Lake, Minnesota, U.S. |
| 23 | LFA 143: Lopes vs. Paiva | September 30, 2022 | Ginásio de Esportes Geraldo Magalhães | Recife, Brazil |
| 24 | LFA 144: Gafurov vs. Silva | October 14, 2022 | Sanford Pentagon | Sioux Falls, South Dakota, U.S. |
| 25 | LFA 145: Assis vs. Murray | October 21, 2022 | Oshkosh Arena | Oshkosh, Wisconsin, U.S. |
| 26 | LFA 146: Barbosa vs. Santos | November 4, 2022 | Ginásio do Polvilho | Cajamar, Brazil |
| 27 | LFA 147: Melo vs. Costa | November 18, 2022 | WinnaVegas Casino Resort | Sloan, Iowa, U.S. |
| 28 | LFA 148: Leyva vs. Brown | December 9, 2022 | The Commerce Casino & Hotel | Commerce, California, U.S. |

== Legacy Fighting Alliance 121: Brown vs. Jones ==
Legacy Fighting Alliance 121: Brown vs. Jones
- Promotion: Legacy Fighting Alliance
- Date: January 14, 2022
- Venue: The Bomb Factory
- City: Dallas, Texas, U.S.

Event chronology
| Legacy Fighting Alliance 120: Cantuária vs. Horth | Legacy Fighting Alliance 121: Brown vs. Jones |

Legacy Fighting Alliance 121: Brown vs. Jones was the hundredth-eleventh event of Legacy Fighting Alliance and took place on January 14, 2022. It aired on UFC Fight Pass.

=== Background ===
LFA 121 will also be the celebratory event of the promotion's fifth anniversary and will be headlined by Aaron McKenzie vs Joshua Jones Lightweight bout.

The co-main event of Legacy Fighting Alliance 121st event will feature Elijah Johns vs Brandon Phillips Featherweight bout.

=== Results ===
Main Card
| Weight class | | | | Method | Round | Time | Notes |
|---|---|---|---|---|---|---|---|
| Welterweight | Chris Brown | def. | Steve Jones | TKO (punches) | 3 | 1:04 | (Note: Brown missed weight (174 lbs)) |
| Featherweight | Elijah Johns | def. | Brandon Phillips | Decision (unanimous) (30–27, 30–27, 30–26) | 3 | 5:00 | (Note: Johns missed weight (150.4 lbs)) |
| Bantamweight | Michael Cyr | def. | Alden Coria | Submission (rear-naked choke) | 3 | 3:20 |
| Bantamweight | Isaiah Gutierrez | def. | Keeton Gorton | Submission (guillotine choke) | 2 | 1:28 |
| Featherweight | Anvar Boynazarov | def. | John Pham | KO (knee and punches) | 1 | 0:21 |
| Heavyweight | Jakori Savage | def. | Siteu Senghor | TKO (punches and elbows) | 1 | 3:53 |
Preliminary Card
| Middleweight | Zumar Archer | def. | Akeem Lewis | KO (punches) | 1 | 4:10 |
| Welterweight | Caleb Jensen | def. | Harrison Layne | TKO (punches) | 1 | 0:51 |

== Legacy Fighting Alliance 122: Johnson vs. Mota ==
Legacy Fighting Alliance 122: Johnson vs. Mota
- Promotion: Legacy Fighting Alliance
- Date: January 21, 2022
- Venue: The Factory at the District
- City: St. Louis, Missouri, U.S.

Legacy Fighting Alliance 122: Johnson vs. Mota is the hundredth-twelfth event of Legacy Fighting Alliance and will take place on January 21, 2022. It aired on UFC Fight Pass.

=== Background ===
The event was headlined by aLFA Flyweight Championship bout between reigning champion Charles Johnson and title challenger Carlos Mota.

=== Results ===
Main Card
| Weight class | | | | Method | Round | Time | Notes |
|---|---|---|---|---|---|---|---|
| Flyweight | Charles Johnson (c) | def. | Carlos Mota | TKO (punches) | 5 | 0:45 | (Note: For the LFA Flyweight Championship.) |
| Catchweight (165 lbs) | Arthur Estrázulas | def. | Brant Moore | TKO (punches) | 1 | 1:08 | (Note: Moore missed weight (166.4 lbs)) |
| Lightweight | Gláucio Eliziário | def. | William Starks | Decision (unanimous) (29–28, 29–28, 30–27) | 3 | 5:00 | (Note: Eliziário missed weight (159.8 lbs)) |
| Welterweight | Sarek Shields | def. | Jeremiah Curtright | TKO (doctor stoppage) | 2 | 5:00 |
| Catchweight (130 lbs) | Dan Moriarty | def. | Jett Shell | Submission (heel hook) | 2 | 0:48 |
Preliminary Card
| Women's Bantamweight | Brittney Cloudy | def. | Annette Nichols | TKO (doctor stoppage) | 1 | 3;14 |
| Welterweight | Elmar Umarov | def. | Turner Williams | Submission (rear-naked choke) | 1 | 2:57 |
Amateur Bouts
| Heavyweight | Will Monroe | def. | Avery Wilson | TKO (punches) | 1 | 2:38 |
| Catchweight (150 lbs) | Zac Moore | def. | Jared Medley | Decision (unanimous) (29–28, 29–28, 29–28) | 3 | 5:00 |

== Legacy Fighting Alliance 123: Argueta vs. Santos ==
Legacy Fighting Alliance 123: Argueta vs. Santos
- Promotion: Legacy Fighting Alliance
- Date: February 4, 2022
- Venue: Horseshoe Hammond
- City: Hammond, Indiana, U.S.

Legacy Fighting Alliance 123: Argueta vs. Santos is a mixed martial arts event promoted by Legacy Fighting Alliance and will take place on February 4, 2022. It aired on UFC Fight Pass.

=== Background ===
A bantamweight bout between Daniel Argueta and Mairon Santos was scheduled as the event headliner.

=== Results ===
Main Card
| Weight class | | | | Method | Round | Time | Notes |
|---|---|---|---|---|---|---|---|
| Bantamweight | Daniel Argueta | def. | Mairon Santos | TKO (punches and elbows) | 3 | 2:40 |
| Bantamweight | Askar Askar | def. | Ryskulbek Ibraimov | Decision (unanimous) (29–28, 29–28, 29–28) | 3 | 5:00 |
| Lightweight | Josh Streacker | def. | Miguel Jacob | Decision (split) (28–29, 30–27, 29–28) | 3 | 5:00 | (Note: Jacob missed weight (156.4 lbs).) |
| Flyweight | Cody Davis | def. | Payton Brezinski | Decision (unanimous) (30–26, 30–27, 30–27) | 3 | 5:00 |
| Light Heavyweight | Logan Nail | def. | Halston Williams | KO (punches) | 1 | 1:11 |
| Featherweight | Beau Samaniego | def. | Alberto Rodriguez | Decision (unanimous) (30–26, 30–27, 29–28) | 3 | 5:00 |
Preliminary card
| Flyweight | Kevin Fernandez | def. | Cody Linne | Decision (unanimous) (30–27, 30–27, 30–26) | 3 | 5:00 |
| Light Heavyweight | Gabriel Mota | def. | Tyler Hufnagle | KO (punch) | 1 | 0:18 |
| Lightweight | Justin Lovrich | def. | Aleksander Keca | Submission (rear-naked choke) | 1 | 3:24 |

== Legacy Fighting Alliance 124: Formiga vs. Bunes ==
Legacy Fighting Alliance 124: Formiga vs. Bunes
- Promotion: Legacy Fighting Alliance
- Date: February 11, 2022
- Venue: Arizona Federal Theatre
- City: Phoenix, Arizona, U.S.

Legacy Fighting Alliance 124: Formiga vs. Bunes is a mixed martial arts event promoted by Legacy Fighting Alliance and will take place on February 11, 2022. It aired on UFC Fight Pass.

=== Background ===
The event was headliner by a bantamweight bout between Jussier Formiga and Felipe Bunes. The bout was originally scheduled as a flyweight bout, but was bumped up to bantamweight after Formiga missed weight.

=== Results ===
Main Card
| Weight class | | | | Method | Round | Time | Notes |
|---|---|---|---|---|---|---|---|
| Bantamweight | Jussier Formiga | def. | Felipe Bunes | Technical Submission (rear-naked choke) | 2 | 1:53 | (Note: Formiga missed weight (139 lbs)) |
| Lightweight | Ahmad Suhail Hassanzada | def. | James Wilson | Decision (unanimous) (30–27, 30–27, 30–27) | 3 | 5:00 |
| Heavyweight | Waldo Cortes-Acosta | def. | Derrick Weaver | TKO (punches) | 2 | 0:22 |
| Catchweight (160 lb) | Austin Wourms | def. | Jacobi Jones | Submission (armbar) | 1 | 1:18 | (Note: Austin Wourms missed weight (161.2 lbs)) |
| Bantamweight | Kasey Tanner | def. | Tristan Lindi | TKO (punches) | 1 | 2:16 |
| Flyweight | An Tuan Ho | def. | Guilherme Crossi | TKO (spinning backfist and punches) | 1 | 2:23 |
Preliminary Card
| Flyweight | Braden Aupuni Pagaoa | def. | Federico Flores | KO (punches) | 2 | 1:05 |
| Welterweight | Ovidio Bojorquez | def. | Ben Goodwin | KO (knee and punches) | 2 | 1:49 |
Amateur Bouts
| Lightweight | Alex Martinez | def. | Chris Sandoval | Decision (unanimous) (30–27, 30–26, 30–26) | 3 | 3:00 |
| Welterweight | Jacob Highley | def. | Luke La Vanway | Decision (unanimous) (29–28, 29–28, 29–28) | 3 | 3:00 |

== Legacy Fighting Alliance 125: Amorim vs. Young ==
Legacy Fighting Alliance 125: Amorim vs. Young
- Promotion: Legacy Fighting Alliance
- Date: February 25, 2022
- Venue: Seneca Niagara Casino & Hotel
- City: Niagara Falls, New York, U.S.

Legacy Fighting Alliance 125: Amorim vs. Young is a mixed martial arts event promoted by Legacy Fighting Alliance and will take place on February 25, 2022. It aired on UFC Fight Pass.

=== Background ===
An LFA Women's Strawweight Championship bout for the vacant title between Jaqueline Amorim and Loveth Young was booked as the main event.

=== Results ===
Main Card
| Weight class | | | | Method | Round | Time | Notes |
|---|---|---|---|---|---|---|---|
| Women's Strawweight | Jaqueline Amorim | def. | Lovethpatra Young | Submission (kneebar) | 1 | 1:26 | (Note: For the LFA Women's Strawweight Championship) |
| Welterweight | Adam Fugitt | def. | Solomon Renfro | TKO (punches) | 1 | 0:43 |
| Featherweight | Michael Stack | def. | Caio Gregorio | Decision (unanimous) (29–28, 29–28, 29–28) | 3 | 5:00 |
| Women's Strawweight | Ashley Nichols | def. | Hilarie Rose | Decision (unanimous) (30–27, 30–27, 29–28) | 3 | 5:00 |
| Welterweight | Guilherme Faria | def. | Zach Zane | TKO (leg kicks and punches) | 2 | 3:27 |
Amateur Bout
| Catchweight (200 lb) | Austin Ross | def. | Terry Copling | TKO (punches) | 3 | 0:45 |

== Legacy Fighting Alliance 126: Bilharinho vs. Delano ==
Legacy Fighting Alliance 126: Bilharinho vs. Delano
- Promotion: Legacy Fighting Alliance
- Date: March 11, 2022
- Venue: Complexo Ribalta
- City: Rio de Janeiro, Brazil

Legacy Fighting Alliance 126: Bilharinho vs. Delano is a mixed martial arts event promoted by Legacy Fighting Alliance and will take place on March 11, 2022. It aired on UFC Fight Pass.

=== Background ===
An LFA Featherweight Championship bout for the vacant title between Jonas Bilharinho and Rafael Barbosa was scheduled as the event headliner. Barbosa was later pulled from the bout, after pre-fight exams detected two brain aneurysms.

=== Results ===
Main Card
| Weight class | | | | Method | Round | Time | Notes |
|---|---|---|---|---|---|---|---|
| Featherweight | José Mauro Delano | def. | Jonas Bilharinho | Decision (unanimous) (50–45, 50–45, 48–47) | 5 | 5:00 | (Note: For the vacant LFA Featherweight Championship. Delano missed weight (147 lbs); Only Bilharinho eligible to win title.) |
| Welterweight | Gabriel Bonfim | def. | Eduardo Garvon | Submission (brabo choke) | 1 | 1:19 | (Note: For the vacant LFA Welterweight Championship. Garvon missed weight (175.8 lbs); Only Bonfim eligible to win title.) |
| Lightweight | Ismael Bonfim | def. | Andrey Augusto | Decision (unanimous) (30–27, 30–27, 30–26) | 3 | 5:00 | (Note: Augusto missed weight (159.6 lbs)) |
| Heavyweight | Eduardo Neves | def. | André Vieira | KO (punches) | 1 | 1:04 |
| Women's Bantamweight | Tamires Vidal | def. | Queila Braga | Submission (heel hook) | 2 | 3:36 |
| Light Heavyweight | Rodolfo Bellato | def. | Thiago Vieira | Submission (triangle choke) | 1 | 4:58 |
| Featherweight | Gabriel Braga | def. | Rogerio Furtado Ferreira | Decision (unanimous) (30–27, 30–27, 30–27) | 3 | 5:00 |
Preliminary Card
| Flyweight | Mateus Brauns | def. | Inaildo Santos | TKO (punches) | 1 | 2:10 |
| Middleweight | Lucas Fernando | def. | Rodrigo Lima Novais | Decision (unanimous) (30–27, 30–27, 30–25) | 3 | 5:00 |
| Welterweight | Gabriel Costa | def. | Vandirson Alves | Decision (majority) (29–27, 28–28, 29–27) | 3 | 5:00 | (Note: Alves missed weight (172.6 lbs)) |
| Flyweight | Lincon Santos | def. | Marciano Ferreira | Submission (rear-naked choke) | 1 | 2:24 |
| Heavyweight | Hyago Silva | def. | Matusalém dos Santos | Decision (split) (29–28, 27–30, 29–28) | 3 | 5:00 |

== Legacy Fighting Alliance 127: Diaz vs. Assis ==
Legacy Fighting Alliance 127: Diaz vs. Assis
- Promotion: Legacy Fighting Alliance
- Date: March 25, 2022
- Venue: Commerce Casino
- City: Commerce, California, United States

Legacy Fighting Alliance 127: Diaz vs. Assis is a mixed martial arts event promoted by Legacy Fighting Alliance and will take place on March 25, 2022. It aired on UFC Fight Pass.

=== Background ===
An LFA Middleweight Championship bout for the vacant title between Ozzy Diaz and Bruno Assis was booked as the event headliner.

=== Results ===
Main Card
| Weight class | | | | Method | Round | Time | Notes |
|---|---|---|---|---|---|---|---|
| Middleweight | Ozzy Diaz | def. | Bruno Assis | KO (punches) | 1 | 4:53 | (Note: For the vacant LFA Middleweight Championship) |
| Featherweight | Chase Gibson | def. | Javier Garcia | Decision (unanimous) (30–27, 29–28, 29–28) | 3 | 5:00 |
| Welterweight | Junior Melo | def. | Tommy Aaron | KO (punches) | 1 | 1:37 |
| Catchweight (130 lb) | Wascar Cruz | def. | Karlee Pangilinan | Submission (rear-naked choke) | 1 | 2:25 |
| Bantamweight | Arnold Jimenez | def. | Josh Wang-Kim | DQ (illegal elbows) | 3 | 0:55 |
| Women's Strawweight | Giovanna Canuto | def. | Jasmine Pouncy | Submission (rear-naked choke) | 1 | 2:28 |
Preliminary Card
| Women's Flyweight | Whittany Pyles | def. | Lisa Mauldin | Decision (unanimous) (29–28, 29–28, 30–27) | 3 | 5:00 |
| Heavyweight | Luis Kenneth Schwenke | def. | Diego Vazquez | TKO (punches) | 1 | 2:55 |
| Lightweight | Riley Wiseman | def. | Bryen Dao | Submission (rear-naked choke) | 2 | 1:36 |
| Catchweight (150 lb) | Elijah Leggett | def. | Chris Hernandez | Decision (unanimous) (30–27, 29–28, 29–28) | 3 | 5:00 |

== Legacy Fighting Alliance 128: McKenzie vs. Clay ==
Legacy Fighting Alliance 128: McKenzie vs. Clay
- Promotion: Legacy Fighting Alliance
- Date: April 8, 2022
- Venue: Sanford Pentagon
- City: Sioux Falls, South Dakota, United States

Legacy Fighting Alliance 128: McKenzie vs. Clay is a mixed martial arts event promoted by Legacy Fighting Alliance and will take place on April 8, 2022. It aired on UFC Fight Pass.

=== Background ===
An LFA Lightweight Championship bout for the vacant title between Aaron McKenzie and Lucas Clay was scheduled as the main event.

=== Results ===
Main Card
| Weight class | | | | Method | Round | Time | Notes |
|---|---|---|---|---|---|---|---|
| Lightweight | Aaron McKenzie | def. | Lucas Clay | Decision (split) | 5 | 5:00 | (Note: For the vacant LFA Lightweight Championship) |
| Heavyweight | Jimmy Lawson | def. | Marino Eatman | TKO (punches) | 1 | 0:34 |
| Catchweight (160 lb) | Richie Miranda | def. | Devon Dixon | Submission (guillotine choke) | 3 | 0:27 |
| Catchweight (140 lb) | Bryce Meredith | def. | Jay Viola | TKO (punches) | 3 | 1:04 |
| Bantamweight | Mitchell McKee | def. | Jalen Jackson | TKO (punches) | 1 | 2:02 |
| Welterweight | Thad Jean | def. | Sarek Shields | TKO (punches) | 2 | 3:40 | (Note: Thad Jean missed weight (171.8 lbs)) |
Preliminary Card
| Bantamweight | Abubakar Adamu | def. | Andrew Triolo | TKO (submission to punches) | 1 | 2:24 | (Note: Andrew Triolo missed weight (137.8 lbs)) |
Amateur Bouts
| Women's Bantamweight | Cheyanne Bowers | def. | Kaeley Fenhaus | Submission (armbar) | 2 | 2:50 |

== Legacy Fighting Alliance 129: Petersen vs. Cortes-Acosta ==
Legacy Fighting Alliance 129: Petersen vs. Cortes-Acosta
- Promotion: Legacy Fighting Alliance
- Date: April 15, 2022
- Venue: Mystic Lake Casino Hotel
- City: Prior Lake, Minnesota, United States

Legacy Fighting Alliance 129: Petersen vs. Cortes-Acosta is a mixed martial arts event promoted by Legacy Fighting Alliance and will take place on April 15, 2022. It aired on UFC Fight Pass.

=== Background ===
A LFA Heavyweight Championship between the reigning champion Thomas Petersen and title challenger Waldo Cortes-Acosta was booked as the event headliner.

=== Results ===
Main Card
| Weight class | | | | Method | Round | Time | Notes |
|---|---|---|---|---|---|---|---|
| Heavyweight | Waldo Cortes-Acosta | def. | Thomas Petersen (c) | TKO (punches) | 3 | 4:53 | (Note: For the LFA Heavyweight Championship) |
| Featherweight | Hyder Amil | def. | Devante Sewell | Decision (split) | 3 | 5:00 |
| Flyweight | Tyus White | def. | Jeff Jepsen | Submission (brabo choke) | 1 | 4:44 |
| Middleweight | Dylan Budka | def. | Tee Cummins | Submission (rear-naked choke) | 2 | 3:11 |
| Bantamweight | Quang Le | def. | Sam Paneitz | Decision (unanimous) | 3 | 5:00 |
Preliminary Card
| Welterweight | Scott Writz | def. | Derek Smith | TKO (punches) | 1 | 4:11 |
| Flyweight | Miguel Sanson | def. | Gonzalo Ponce | TKO (corner stoppage) | 1 | 5:00 |
| Bantamweight | Reshal Malik | def. | Kyles Vang | Decision (unanimous) | 3 | 5:00 |
| Featherweight | Austin Robinson | def. | Mike O'Gorman | Submission (guillotine choke) | 2 | 0:22 |
Amateur Bouts
| Bantamweight | Gabriel Wanderley | def. | Santos Verdinez | Submission (armbar) | 2 | 2:55 |
| Welterweight | Scott Zeller | def. | Andrew Wilson | KO (punches) | 1 | 0:22 |
| Lightweight | Mitchell Wilson | def. | John Fudge | Decision (unanimous) | 3 | 3:00 |
| Bantamweight | Gunner Charbonneau | def. | Eric Newman | Submission (rear-naked choke) | 1 | 1:07 | (Note: Charbonneau missed weight (137.4 lbs)) |

== Legacy Fighting Alliance 130: Ksiazkiewicz vs. Gambulino ==
Legacy Fighting Alliance 130: Ksiazkiewicz vs. Gambulino
- Promotion: Legacy Fighting Alliance
- Date: April 22, 2022
- Venue: 4 Bears Casino & Lodge
- City: New Town, North Dakota, United States

Legacy Fighting Alliance 130: Ksiazkiewicz vs. Gambulino was a mixed martial arts event promoted by Legacy Fighting Alliance, which took place on April 22, 2022. It aired on UFC Fight Pass.

=== Background ===
A middleweight bout between Mariusz Książkiewicz and Alessandro Gambulino was scheduled as the main event.

=== Results ===
Main Card
| Weight class | | | | Method | Round | Time | Notes |
|---|---|---|---|---|---|---|---|
| Middleweight | Mariusz Książkiewicz | def. | Alessandro Gambulino | TKO (knee to the body and punches) | 1 | 1:29 |
| Women's Strawweight | Marnic Mann | def. | Kelsey Arnesen | Decision (split) | 3 | 5:00 |
| Women's Strawweight | Hilarie Rose | def. | Tiani Valle | Submission (rear-naked choke) | 2 | 3:35 |
| Welterweight | Jalin Fuller | def. | Gage Saunders | Submission (rear-naked choke) | 1 | 2:18 |
| Catchweight (187 lbs) | Darrius Flowers | def. | Daniel Gadley | TKO (punches) | 2 | 0:46 |
| Middleweight | Billy Elekana | def. | Kohlman Scribner | TKO (head kick and punches) | 1 | 3:02 | (Note: Billy Elekana missed weight (191.2 lbs)) |
Preliminary Card
| Lightweight | Mark Johnson | def. | Weston Ogan | TKO (punches) | 2 | 4:16 |
| Lightweight | Brandon Brisbo | def. | Jorge Apalategui | Submission (rear-naked choke) | 1 | 0:44 |

== Legacy Fighting Alliance 131: Argueta vs. Silva ==
Legacy Fighting Alliance 131: Argueta vs. Silva
- Promotion: Legacy Fighting Alliance
- Date: May 6, 2022
- Venue: Oshkosh Arena
- City: Oshkosh, Wisconsin, United States

Legacy Fighting Alliance 131: Argueta vs. Silva is a mixed martial arts event promoted by Legacy Fighting Alliance and will take place on May 6, 2022. It aired on UFC Fight Pass.

=== Background ===
An LFA Bantamweight Championship bout for the vacant title between Daniel Argueta and Diego Silva was booked as the event headliner.

=== Results ===
Main Card
| Weight class | | | | Method | Round | Time | Notes |
|---|---|---|---|---|---|---|---|
| Bantamweight | Daniel Argueta | def. | Diego Silva | Decision (split) | 5 | 5:00 | (Note: For the vacant LFA Bantamweight Championship.) |
| Middleweight | Darrius Flowers | def. | Tim Hiley | KO (punches) | 1 | 0:43 |
| Welterweight | Myktybek Orolbay | def. | Jalin Fuller | Decision (unanimous) | 3 | 5:00 | (Note: Orolbay missed weight (172 lbs)) |
| Light Heavyweight | Hamza Salim | def. | Wes Schultz | Decision (unanimous) | 3 | 5:00 |
| Lightweight | Kegan Gennrich | def. | Austin Lutchen | Decision (unanimous) | 3 | 5:00 |
| Featherweight | David Evans | def. | Gary Konkol | Decision (unanimous) | 3 | 5:00 |
Preliminary Card
| Middleweight | Nick Klein | def. | Tristan Overvig | Decision (unanimous) | 3 | 5:00 |
| Women's Strawweight | Christy Tyquiengco | def. | Leslie Hernandez | Decision (split) | 3 | 5:00 | (Note: Hernandez missed weight (117 lbs)) |
Amateur Bouts
| Women's Strawweight | Maria Henderson | def. | Jena Williams | Submission (triangle keylock) | 3 | 1:41 |
| Flyweight | Edwin Jimenez | def. | Randy Rivera-Santiago | Decision (split) | 3 | 3:00 |
| Welterweight | Dalton Holmes | def. | Malaquias Jarmon | TKO (punches) | 1 | 1:32 |
| Bantamweight | Jeremy Strobel Jr. | def. | Andre Sellars | TKO (punches) | 3 | 1:11 |

== Legacy Fighting Alliance 132: Gomes vs. Costa ==
Legacy Fighting Alliance 132: Gomes vs. Costa
- Promotion: Legacy Fighting Alliance
- Date: May 13, 2022
- Venue: Quali Stage
- City: Rio de Janeiro, Brazil

Legacy Fighting Alliance 132: Gomes vs. Costa is a mixed martial arts event promoted by Legacy Fighting Alliance and will take place on May 13, 2022. It aired on UFC Fight Pass.

=== Background ===
A lightweight bout between Rodrigo Lídio and Italo Gomes was scheduled as the main event.

=== Results ===
Main Card
| Weight class | | | | Method | Round | Time | Notes |
|---|---|---|---|---|---|---|---|
| Lightweight | Italo Gomes | def. | Melquizael Costa | Decision (unanimous) | 3 | 5:00 |
| Bantamweight | Luan Luiz Lacerda | def. | Marcirley Alves | Submission (rear-naked choke) | 2 | 1:24 | (Note: da Silva missed weight (136.6 lbs)) |
| Featherweight | Gabriel Silva | def. | Rono Junior | Decision (unanimous) | 3 | 5:00 |
| Light Heavyweight | Leo Leite | def. | Patrick Quadros | Decision (unanimous) | 3 | 5:00 |
| Women's Strawweight | Bruna Emanuele Brasil | def. | Yasmin Castanho | Decision (unanimous) | 3 | 5:00 |
| Women's Flyweight | Gabriella Fernandes Hermogenes | def. | Edna Oliveira Ajala | TKO (submission to strikes) | 3 | 3:17 |
| Middleweight | José Henrique Souza | def. | Pedro Oliveira | Decision (split) | 3 | 5:00 |
Preliminary Card
| Heavyweight | Hyago Silva | vs. | Richard Jacobi | Draw (majority) | 3 | 5:00 |
| Welterweight | Jefferson Todynho | def. | Uyran Carlos | Decision (unanimous) | 3 | 5:00 | (Note: Carlos missed weight (173 lbs)) |
| Catchweight (131 lb) | Lincon Santos | def. | Cristian Rodrigo Roldan | Decision (unanimous) | 3 | 5:00 |
| Lightweight | Gabriel Souza Galindo de Melo | def. | Lucas Sousa | Submission (rear-naked choke) | 1 | 3:52 |
| Lightweight | João Moraes | def. | Gabriel de Oliveira Souza | Submission (arm-triangle choke) | 1 | 4:41 |

== Legacy Fighting Alliance 133: Stack vs. Delano ==
Legacy Fighting Alliance 133: Stack vs. Delano
- Promotion: Legacy Fighting Alliance
- Date: June 3, 2022
- Venue: Magness Arena
- City: Denver, Colorado, United States

Legacy Fighting Alliance 133: Stack vs. Delano is a mixed martial arts event promoted by Legacy Fighting Alliance and will take place on June 3, 2022. It aired on UFC Fight Pass.

=== Results ===
Main Card
| Weight class | | | | Method | Round | Time | Notes |
|---|---|---|---|---|---|---|---|
| Featherweight | José Delano | def. | Michael Stack | Decision (unanimous) | 5 | 5:00 | (Note: For the vacant LFA Featherweight Championship. Delano missed weight (150 lbs); Only Stack eligible to win title.) |
| Welterweight | Haris Talundžić | def. | Bahatebole Batebolati | Decision (unanimous) | 3 | 5:00 |
| Welterweight | Trey Waters | def. | Benjamin Bennett | KO (knee) | 3 | 4:37 |
| Welterweight | Jeremiah Curtright | def. | Ryan Charlebois | Disqualification (elbows to back of head) | 1 | 3:15 |
| Lightweight | Jacobi Jones | def. | Riley Wiseman | TKO (corner stoppage) | 1 | 2:09 |
| Heavyweight | Ben Tynan | def. | Trevor Wallace | Submission (arm-triangle choke) | 1 | 1:33 |
Preliminary Card
| Featherweight | Jota Ninomiya | def. | Ricky Field | TKO (punches) | 1 | 0:34 |
| Flyweight | Llorrvic Acevedo | def. | Aasin Liberato | Submission (guillotine choke) | 1 | 4:36 |
| Flyweight | Frankie Sanchez | def. | Joe Stafford | TKO (punches) | 2 | 0:55 |
| Flyweight | Miguel Perez | def. | Mike Mazariego | Submission (rear-naked choke) | 1 | 4:04 |
| Catchweight (130 lbs) | Luis Gurule | def. | Anthony Valenzuela | TKO (punches) | 1 | 1:16 | (Note: Gurule missed weight (130.6 lbs)) |
Amateur Bouts
| Lightweight | Jeremiah Humphrey | def. | David Evenson | TKO (punches) | 2 | 2:59 |
| Middleweight | Cody Jerabek | def. | Iaian McGhee | Submission (ankle lock) | 1 | 0:56 | (Note: Jerabek missed weight (186.6 lbs)) |

== Legacy Fighting Alliance 134: Gafurov vs. Sousa ==
Legacy Fighting Alliance 134: Gafurov vs. Sousa
- Promotion: Legacy Fighting Alliance
- Date: June 10, 2022
- Venue: Bell County Expo Center
- City: Belton, Texas, United States

Legacy Fighting Alliance 134: Gafurov vs. Sousa is a mixed martial arts event promoted by Legacy Fighting Alliance and will take place on June 10, 2022. It aired on UFC Fight Pass.

=== Background ===
The event was headlined by a bantamweight bout between Muin Gafurov and Herbeth Sousa.

=== Results ===
Main Card
| Weight class | | | | Method | Round | Time | Notes |
|---|---|---|---|---|---|---|---|
| Bantamweight | Muin Gafurov | def. | Herbeth Sousa | KO (punch) | 2 | 1:56 | (Note: Gafurov missed weight (136.2 lbs)) |
| Featherweight | Milko Tucto | def. | Olivier Murad | Decision (split) | 3 | 5:00 | (Note: Tucto missed weight (146.4 lbs)) |
| Flyweight | Joseph Camacho | def. | Alden Coria | Decision (unanimous) | 3 | 5:00 |
| Middleweight | Shane Sobnosky | def. | Jared McLoughlin | TKO (corner stoppage) | 1 | 5:00 |
| Flyweight | Jordan Harris | def. | Kevin Fernandez | Decision (unanimous) | 3 | 5:00 |
| Heavyweight | Jakori Savage | def. | Taylor Escamilla | Submission (armbar) | 1 | 2:42 |
| Light Heavyweight | Tanner Marlow | def. | Joel Guzman | TKO (punches) | 2 | 2:10 |
Preliminary Card
| Bantamweight | Mateo Gonzalez | def. | Cody Rondeau | TKO (doctor stoppage) | 2 | 3:06 |
| Featherweight | Enrique Owens | def. | Gunner Coronado | Decision (unanimous) | 3 | 5:00 |
| Middleweight | Zumarr Archer | def. | Tanner Arnold | KO (punches) | 1 | 2:13 |
| Welterweight | Harrison Layne | def. | BJ Miller | Submission (rear-naked choke) | 1 | 2:00 |
| Bantamweight | Ian Engbrock | def. | Steven Lontine | TKO (punches) | 1 | 2:17 |
Amateur Bouts
| Welterweight | Josh Zarazua | def. | Jody Oliver | Decision (unanimous) | 3 | 3:00 |
| Lightweight | Dawson Moore | def. | Omar Alramahi | Submission (rear-naked choke) | 3 | 1:24 |
| Welterweight | Jordan Bradley | def. | Kieran Carthan | KO (punches) | 1 | 1:11 |

== Legacy Fighting Alliance 135: Leyva vs. Reis ==
Legacy Fighting Alliance 135: Leyva vs. Reis
- Promotion: Legacy Fighting Alliance
- Date: July 8, 2022
- Venue: Arizona Federal Theatre
- City: Phoenix, Arizona, United States

Legacy Fighting Alliance 135: Leyva vs. Reis is a mixed martial arts event promoted by Legacy Fighting Alliance and will take place on July 8, 2022. It aired on UFC Fight Pass.

=== Results ===
Main Card
| Weight class | | | | Method | Round | Time | Notes |
|---|---|---|---|---|---|---|---|
| Welterweight | Alfonso Leyva | def. | Daniel Reis | TKO (elbows) | 2 | 1:10 |
| Flyweight | Felipe Bunes | def. | Wascar Cruz | Decision (split) | 3 | 5:00 |
| Lightweight | Lucas Clay | def. | Austin Wourms | TKO (knees) | 1 | 2:59 | (Note: Clay missed weight (160.2 lbs)) |
| Bantamweight | Allan Begosso | def. | Paris Stanford | KO (flying knee) | 1 | 0:45 |
| Women's Flyweight | Jena Bishop | def. | Luana Santos | Decision (split) | 3 | 5:00 |
| Bantamweight | Rafael do Nascimento | def. | Marcus McGhee | Submission (rear-naked choke) | 1 | 3:12 |
| Women's Strawweight | Maria Henderson | def. | Melanie McIntyre | Submission (triangle keylock) | 1 | 1:42 |
Preliminary Card
| Flyweight | An Ho | def. | Matthew Barro | KO (head kick) | 1 | 0:14 |
| Lightweight | Cedric Katambwa | def. | James Hay | Decision (unanimous) | 3 | 5:00 |
| Featherweight | Angel Atoigue | def. | Nick Alwag | Decision (unanimous) | 3 | 5:00 |
Amateur Bouts
| Bantamweight | Chance Ikei | def. | Shamar Williams | Decision (unanimous) | 3 | 5:00 |
| Lightweight | Enrique Barcenas | def. | Scott Hokit | TKO (punches) | 2 | 1:05 |

== Legacy Fighting Alliance 136: Rio de Janeiro vs. São Paulo ==
Legacy Fighting Alliance 136: Rio de Janeiro vs. São Paulo
- Promotion: Legacy Fighting Alliance
- Date: July 15, 2022
- Venue: Centro Esportivo Municipal Ubaldo Gonçalves
- City: Caraguatatuba, Brazil

Legacy Fighting Alliance 136: Rio de Janeiro vs. São Paulo is a mixed martial arts event promoted by Legacy Fighting Alliance and will take place on July 15, 2022. It aired on UFC Fight Pass.

=== Results ===
Main Card
| Weight class | | | | Method | Round | Time | Notes |
|---|---|---|---|---|---|---|---|
| Featherweight | Wellington Prado | def. | Italo Gomes | Decision (majority) | 3 | 5:00 |
| Flyweight | Davi Costa | def. | Eduardo Henrique | Decision (unanimous) | 3 | 5:00 |
| Light Heavyweight | Bruno Lopes | def. | Mailton Azevedo | Submission (arm-triangle choke) | 1 | 4:49 |
| Women's Strawweight | Ediana Silva | def. | Amanda Torres | Decision (unanimous) | 3 | 5:00 |
| Featherweight | Jonas Bilharinho | def. | Pedro Lopes | Decision (unanimous) | 3 | 5:00 |
| Bantamweight | Rafael Costa | def. | Wallace Lopes | Decision (unanimous) | 3 | 5:00 |
| Flyweight | Júnior Assis | def. | Hermison Oliveira | Decision (unanimous) | 3 | 5:00 |
Preliminary Card
| Lightweight | Jairo Pacheco | def. | Rhalber Bernardo | TKO (punches) | 2 | 4:33 |
| Lightweight | Gabriel Souza Galindo | def. | Patrick Bittencourt | Submission (guillotine choke) | 2 | 4:04 |
| Middleweight | Ewerton Polaquini | def. | Alexandre Silva | Submission (rear-naked choke) | 2 | 4:00 |
| Women's Strawweight | Dayane Cristina | def. | Maria Santana | Decision (unanimous) | 3 | 5:00 |

== Legacy Fighting Alliance 137: Gibson vs. Amil ==
Legacy Fighting Alliance 137: Gibson vs. Amil
- Promotion: Legacy Fighting Alliance
- Date: July 29, 2022
- Venue: Commerce Casino
- City: Commerce, California, United States

Legacy Fighting Alliance 137: Gibson vs. Amil is a mixed martial arts event promoted by Legacy Fighting Alliance and will take place on July 29, 2022. It aired on UFC Fight Pass.

=== Background ===
The event was headlined by a featherweight bout between Chase Gibson and Hyder Amil.

=== Results ===
Main Card
| Weight class | | | | Method | Round | Time | Notes |
|---|---|---|---|---|---|---|---|
| Featherweight | Hyder Amil | def. | Chase Gibson | TKO (punches) | 2 | 0:11 |
| Bantamweight | John Sweeney | def. | Ricardo Dias | Decision (split) | 3 | 5:00 | (Note: Sweeney missed weight (140 lbs)) |
| Catchweight (160 lb) | Darren Smith Jr. | def. | Jacob Rosales | TKO (punches) | 2 | 3:56 |
| Lightweight | Jean-Paul Lebosnoyani | def. | Caleb Hall | Submission (scarf hold armlock) | 1 | 1:21 | (Note: Hall missed weight (161.6 lbs)) |
| Flyweight | Mark Climaco | def. | Cody Davis | Decision (unanimous) | 3 | 5:00 |
| Featherweight | Javier Garcia | def. | Leandro Gomes | Submission (rear-naked choke) | 1 | 4:59 |
| Middleweight | Daniel Compton | def. | Billy Elekana | Decision (split) | 3 | 5:00 |
Preliminary Card
| Flyweight | Mefi Monterroso | def. | Karlee Pangilinan | TKO (punches) | 2 | 4:13 |
| Welterweight | Tyson Miller | def. | Emmanueli Adzoh | KO (punch) | 1 | 0:47 |
| Featherweight | Danny Silva | def. | Elijah Leggett | Decision (unanimous) | 3 | 5:00 |
| Women's Strawweight | Alandria Brown | def. | Jasmine Pouncy | Submission (rear-naked choke) | 2 | 3:55 |
| Welterweight | Jeffrey Craig | def. | Orlando Sanders | KO (flying knee) | 1 | 4:51 |

== Legacy Fighting Alliance 138: Farias vs. Tanaka ==
Legacy Fighting Alliance 138: Farias vs. Tanaka
- Promotion: Legacy Fighting Alliance
- Date: August 5, 2022
- Venue: Grand Hotel Casino & Resort
- City: Shawnee, Oklahoma, United States

Legacy Fighting Alliance 138: Farias vs. Tanaka is a mixed martial arts event promoted by Legacy Fighting Alliance and will take place on August 5, 2022. It aired on UFC Fight Pass.

=== Background ===
The event was headlined by a bantamweight bout between Ary Farias and five-time UFC veteran Michinori Tanaka.

=== Results ===
Main Card
| Weight class | | | | Method | Round | Time | Notes |
|---|---|---|---|---|---|---|---|
| Bantamweight | Ary Farias | def. | Michinori Tanaka | Decision (split) | 3 | 5:00 |
| Bantamweight | Diego Silva | def. | Askar Askar | Decision (split) | 3 | 5:00 | (Note: Silva missed weight (137.2 lbs)) |
| Featherweight | Elijah Johns | def. | Masuto Kawana | Decision (unanimous) | 3 | 5:00 |
| Catchweight (148 lb) | AJ Cunningham | def. | Shea Conley | Decision (unanimous) | 3 | 5:00 |
| Featherweight | Nick Talavera | def. | Jota Ninomiya | Submission (rear-naked choke) | 1 | 2:41 |
| Catchweight (150 lb) | Chris Mecate | def. | Motaz Askar | Decision (unanimous) | 3 | 5:00 |
Preliminary Card
| Featherweight | Kallum Parker | def. | Ashton Kirby | Decision (unanimous) | 3 | 5:00 |
| Featherweight | Ryan Hoover | def. | Jared Brown | TKO | 2 | 4:46 | (Note: Brown missed weight (147.6 lbs)) |
Amateur Bouts
| Catchweight (195 lb) | David Wright | def. | Gabe Conner | TKO (punches) | 1 | 1:36 |
| Catchweight (165 lb) | Triston Gwaltney | def. | Abbas Mounshed | Submission (arm-triangle choke) | 3 | 1:00 |

== Legacy Fighting Alliance 139: Assenza vs. Melo ==
Legacy Fighting Alliance 139: Assenza vs. Melo
- Promotion: Legacy Fighting Alliance
- Date: August 19, 2022
- Venue: Seneca Niagara Resort & Casino
- City: Niagara Falls, New York, United States

Legacy Fighting Alliance 139: Assenza vs. Melo is a mixed martial arts event promoted by Legacy Fighting Alliance and will take place on August 19, 2022. It aired on UFC Fight Pass.

=== Results ===
Main Card
| Weight class | | | | Method | Round | Time | Notes |
|---|---|---|---|---|---|---|---|
| Lightweight | Junior Melo | def. | Adam Assenza | TKO (punches) | 3 | 0:59 |
| Bantamweight | Teshay Gouthro | def. | Arnold Jimenez | Decision (unanimous) | 3 | 5:00 |
| Welterweight | Logan Urban | def. | Ryan Charlebois | Decision (unanimous) | 3 | 5:00 |
| Middleweight | Dylan Budka | def. | Lydell Poag | Decision (unanimous) | 3 | 5:00 |
| Flyweight | Freddie Rodriguez | def. | Gavin Teasdale | Decision (unanimous) | 3 | 5:00 |
Preliminary Card
| Middleweight | Liam Anderson | def. | Robert Gidron | TKO (punches) | 1 | 4:48 |
| Lightweight | Luke Roberts | def. | Derrick Patterson | Submission (rear-naked choke) | 1 | 4:59 |
Amateur Bouts
| Light Heavyweight | Austin Ross | def. | Matt Smith | TKO (punches) | 3 | 2:12 |
| Flyweight | Alex Moher | def. | Kevin Hixson | Submission (arm-triangle choke) | 2 | 1:46 |

== Legacy Fighting Alliance 140: Mota vs. Abuev ==
Legacy Fighting Alliance 140: Mota vs. Abuev
- Promotion: Legacy Fighting Alliance
- Date: August 26, 2022
- Venue: 4 Bears Casino & Lodge
- City: New Town, North Dakota, United States

Legacy Fighting Alliance 140: Mota vs. Abuev is a mixed martial arts event promoted by Legacy Fighting Alliance and will take place on August 26, 2022. It aired on UFC Fight Pass.

=== Results ===
Main Card
| Weight class | | | | Method | Round | Time | Notes |
|---|---|---|---|---|---|---|---|
| Flyweight | Carlos Mota | def. | Rizvan Abuev | KO (punch) | 1 | 3:14 | (Note: For the vacant LFA Flyweight Championship.) |
| Welterweight | Bahatebole Batebolati | def. | Ryan Leininger | Decision (split) | 3 | 5:00 | (Note: Batebolati missed weight (171.6 lbs)) |
| Lightweight | Richie Miranda | def. | Elijah Harris | TKO (punches) | 1 | 4:34 |
| Welterweight | Ray Waters | def. | Leivon Lewis | Decision (unanimous) | 3 | 5:00 |
| Flyweight | Braden Pagaoa | def. | Dillion Cox | Decision (unanimous) | 3 | 5:00 |
Preliminary Card
| Middleweight | Wes Schultz | def. | Jon Knutson | Submission (rear-naked choke) | 2 | 0:53 |
| Catchweight (165 lb) | Carlos Trinidad | def. | D'Ante Arnett | KO (punch) | 1 | 3:53 |

== Legacy Fighting Alliance 141: Talundžić vs. Brown ==
Legacy Fighting Alliance 141: Talundžić vs. Brown
- Promotion: Legacy Fighting Alliance
- Date: September 9, 2022
- Venue: Dobson Arena
- City: Vail, Colorado, United States

Legacy Fighting Alliance 141: Talundžić vs. Brown is a mixed martial arts event promoted by Legacy Fighting Alliance and will take place on September 9, 2022. It aired on UFC Fight Pass.

=== Background ===
LFA 141 was headlined by a welterweight bout between Haris Talundžić and Chris Brown.

=== Results ===
Main Card
| Weight class | | | | Method | Round | Time | Notes |
|---|---|---|---|---|---|---|---|
| Welterweight | Chris Brown | def. | Haris Talundžić | Decision (Unanimous) | 3 | 5:00 |
| Bantamweight | Bryce Meredith | def. | Nathan Fought | Submission (rear-naked choke) | 1 | 4:36 | (Note: Fought missed weight (139.8 lbs)) |
| Women's Strawweight | Kelsey Arnesen | def. | Kathryn Paprocki | Decision (split) | 3 | 5:00 |
| Flyweight | Luis Gurule | def. | Josiah Reyes | TKO (knee and punches) | 1 | 1:15 |
| Heavyweight | Ben Tynan | def. | Lance Lee | TKO (punches) | 1 | 1:20 |
Preliminary Card
| Flyweight | Kevin Fernandez | def. | Llorrvic Acevedo | Submission (rear-naked choke) | 1 | 2:25 |

== Legacy Fighting Alliance 142: Amorim vs. Nichols ==
Legacy Fighting Alliance 142: Amorim vs. Nichols
- Promotion: Legacy Fighting Alliance
- Date: September 16, 2022
- Venue: Mystic Lake Casino Hotel
- City: Prior Lake, Minnesota, United States

Legacy Fighting Alliance 142: Amorim vs. Nichols is a mixed martial arts event promoted by Legacy Fighting Alliance and will take place on September 16, 2022. It aired on UFC Fight Pass.

=== Background ===
A LFA Women's Strawweight Championship bout between champion Jaqueline Amorim and title challenger Ashley Nichols was scheduled as the main event.

=== Results ===
Main Card
| Weight class | | | | Method | Round | Time | Notes |
|---|---|---|---|---|---|---|---|
| Women's Strawweight | Jaqueline Amorim (c) | def. | Ashley Nichols | Submission (armbar) | 1 | 4:39 | (Note: For the LFA Women's Strawweight Championship) |
| Heavyweight | Thomas Petersen | def. | Kory Moegenburg | TKO (punches) | 2 | 3:14 |
| Bantamweight | Sean McPadden | def. | Michael Cyr | Submission (ninja choke) | 2 | 3:26 |
| Women's Strawweight | Giovanna Canuto | def. | Jamie Colleen | Decision (unanimous) | 3 | 5:00 |
| Bantamweight | Zach Vaci | def. | Rob Fenicle | Decision (unanimous) | 3 | 5:00 |
| Catchweight (189 lb) | Adam Vigil | def. | Manatua Lemaire | KO (punches) | 1 | 2:57 |
Preliminary Card
| Flyweight | Dan Moriarty | def. | Oscar Jurado Sánchez | Technical Decision (split) | 3 | 2:21 |
| Lightweight | Donald Bush | def. | Jimmy Padilla | Submission (arm-triangle choke) | 1 | 1:24 |
| Featherweight | Griffin Parriott | def. | Ratavious Thrasher | Submission (arm-triangle choke) | 1 | 2:16 |
| Featherweight | Gary Konkol | def. | Sam Hernandez | Submission (arm-triangle choke) | 2 | 3:10 | (Note: Hernandez missed weight (147.2 lbs)) |
| Bantamweight | Devon Lozej | def. | Reshal Malik | Decision (unanimous) | 3 | 5:00 |
| Middleweight | Cody Jerabek | def. | Bruce Xavier | KO (punch) | 1 | 2:32 | (Note: Jerabek missed weight (187.4 lbs)) |
Amateur Bouts
| Heavyweight | Steven Asplund | def. | Rick Jones | Decision (unanimous) | 3 | 3:00 |
| Bantamweight | Shamar Williams | def. | Jared McKinley | TKO (doctor stoppage) | 1 | 3:00 |
| Women's Catchweight (142 lb) | Taylor Meyers | def. | Shaelyn O'Connor | Decision (majority) | 3 | 3:00 |
| Lightweight | Mitchell Wilson | def. | Nowa Blabuh | Decision (unanimous) | 3 | 3:00 |
| Flyweight | Noah Gasho | def. | Daniel Guadalajara | Submission (rear-naked choke) | 1 | 2:47 |
| Catchweight (130 lb) | Shad Walters | def. | Andre Sellars | KO (punch) | 2 | 0:10 |

== Legacy Fighting Alliance 143: Lopes vs. Paiva ==
Legacy Fighting Alliance 143: Lopes vs. Paiva
- Promotion: Legacy Fighting Alliance
- Date: September 30, 2022
- Venue: Ginásio de Esportes Geraldo Magalhães
- City: Recife, Brazil

Legacy Fighting Alliance 143: Lopes vs. Paiva is a mixed martial arts event promoted by Legacy Fighting Alliance and will take place on September 30, 2022. It aired on UFC Fight Pass.

=== Background ===
A LFA Light Heavyweight Championship bout for the vacant title between Bruno Lopes and Willyanedson Paiva was booked as the main event. An interim LFA Women's Flyweight Championship bout between Gabriella Hermógenes and Karoline Martins served as the co-main event.

=== Results ===
Main Card
| Weight class | | | | Method | Round | Time | Notes |
|---|---|---|---|---|---|---|---|
| Light Heavyweight | Bruno Lopes | def. | Willyanedson Paiva | TKO (punches) | 2 | 1:39 | (Note: For the vacant LFA Light Heavyweight Championship) |
| Women's Flyweight | Gabriella Hermógenes | def. | Karoline Martins | Submission (guillotine choke) | 2 | 3:03 | (Note: For the Interim LFA Women's Flyweight Championship.) |
| Featherweight | José Delano | def. | Jair Jesuino | KO (knee) | 1 | 3:00 |
| Lightweight | Marcelo Marques | def. | Augusto Matias | Technical Decision (unanimous) | 3 | 5:00 |
| Featherweight | Caio Machado | def. | Gabriel Silva | Decision (unanimous) | 3 | 5:00 |
| Women's Strawweight | Rose Conceição | def. | Mayara Thays | Decision (unanimous) | 3 | 5:00 |
| Heavyweight | Edinaldo Novaes | def. | Maicon Douglas | Decision (unanimous) | 3 | 5:00 |
Preliminary Card
| Middleweight | Lucas Fernando | def. | Fabio Aguiar | TKO (punches) | 1 | 2:55 | (Note: Aguiar missed weight (188.8 lbs)) |
| Featherweight | Neto Oliveira | def. | Leonardo da Silva | Submission (guillotine choke) | 1 | 0:40 |
| Lightweight | Kauê Fernandes | def. | José Arly | KO (body kick) | 1 | 1:28 |
| Light Heavyweight | Vitor Costa | def. | Miguel Firmino | Decision (split) | 3 | 5:00 |
| Women's Strawweight | Natalia Alves | def. | Ingrid Silva | TKO | 2 | 3:06 |
| Flyweight | Cassio Arduini | def. | Luís Aguiar | Submission (heel hook) | 1 | 1:48 |

== Legacy Fighting Alliance 144: Gafurov vs. Silva ==
Legacy Fighting Alliance 144: Gafurov vs. Silva
- Promotion: Legacy Fighting Alliance
- Date: October 14, 2022
- Venue: Sanford Pentagon
- City: Sioux Falls, South Dakota, United States

Legacy Fighting Alliance 144: Gafurov vs. Silva is a mixed martial arts event promoted by Legacy Fighting Alliance and will take place on October 14, 2022. It aired on UFC Fight Pass.

=== Results ===
Main Card
| Weight class | | | | Method | Round | Time | Notes |
|---|---|---|---|---|---|---|---|
| Bantamweight | Muin Gafurov | def. | Diego Silva | KO (spinning back kick) | 3 | 0:23 | (Note: For the vacant LFA Bantamweight Championship. Silva missed weight (137.6 lbs); Only Gafurov eligible to win title.) |
| Heavyweight | Jordan Heiderman | def. | Daiqwon Buckley | Submission (americana) | 1 | 3:17 |
| Flyweight | Yuma Horiuchi | def. | Juan Puerta | Submission (rear-naked choke) | 3 | 1:23 |
| Middleweight | Renato Valente | def. | Jared Revel | KO (punch) | 1 | 1:07 |
| Flyweight | Christian Natividad | def. | Israel Galvan | Decision (unanimous) (30–27, 30–27, 30–27) | 3 | 5:00 |
| Lightweight | Jacobi Jones | def. | Christian Turner | Submission (rear-naked choke) | 2 | 2:25 |
Preliminary Card
| Heavyweight | Ronald Coleman | def. | Chato Wiest | TKO (punches) | 1 | 1:03 |
| Bantamweight | Adamu Isah | def. | Mateo Gonzalez | Decision (unanimous) (30–27, 30–27, 30–25) | 3 | 5:00 |
| Welterweight | Patrick Rivera | def. | Brady Minner | Submission (neck crank) | 1 | 3:19 |
| Women's Bantamweight | Tsend-Ayuushiin Naranjargal | def. | Cheyanne Bowers | Submission (scarf hold armbar) | 1 | 3:23 |
| Welterweight | Ben Schauer | def. | Jeff Nielsen | Decision (split) | 3 | 5:00 |
| Lightweight | Robson Junior | def. | Andres Murray | TKO (punches) | 1 | 0:29 |
Amateur Bouts
| Middleweight | Brian Sullivan | def. | Damen Moyer | TKO (punches) | 3 | 1:01 |
| Women's Flyweight | Annabel Kelly | def. | Samantha Nabity | TKO (punches) | 3 | 1:12 |
| Bantamweight | Patrick Kelly | def. | Dylan Stanke | Submission (rear-naked choke) | 1 | 1:42 |
| Featherweight | Nicolas Colunga | def. | Roy Magana | TKO (punches) | 1 | 0:39 |

== Legacy Fighting Alliance 145: Assis vs. Murray ==
Legacy Fighting Alliance 145: Assis vs. Murray
- Promotion: Legacy Fighting Alliance
- Date: October 21, 2022
- Venue: Oshkosh Arena
- City: Oshkosh, Wisconsin, United States

Legacy Fighting Alliance 145: Assis vs. Murray was a mixed martial arts event promoted by Legacy Fighting Alliance and took place on October 21, 2022. It aired on UFC Fight Pass.

=== Results ===
Main Card
| Weight class | | | | Method | Round | Time | Notes |
|---|---|---|---|---|---|---|---|
| Light Heavyweight | Bruno Assis | def. | Jesse Murray | Submission (armbar) | 1 | 4:11 |
| Women's Flyweight | Jena Bishop | def. | Olivia Beeskau | Submission (rear-naked choke) | 1 | 2:02 |
| Flyweight | Miguel Sanson | def. | Tyus White | Decision (unanimous) (29–28, 29–28, 30–27) | 3 | 5:00 |
| Lightweight | Kegan Gennrich | vs. | Jake Kozorosky | Submission (armbar) | 2 | 2:59 |
| Welterweight | Scott Writz | def. | Craig Fruth | TKO (punches) | 1 | 3:51 |
Preliminary Card
| Flyweight | Cody Linne | def. | Payton Brezinski | Decision (unanimous) (29–28, 29–28, 29–28) | 3 | 5:00 |
| Women's Strawweight | Rachel Martinez | vs. | Diamond Long | TKO (punches) | 1 | 4:00 |
| Bantamweight | Santos Verdinez | def. | Kevin Messer | TKO (punches) | 1 | 4:44 |
Amateur Bouts
| Welterweight | Dalton Holmes | def. | Jeremy Landowski | TKO (punches) | 2 | 4:05 |

== Legacy Fighting Alliance 146: Barbosa vs. Santos ==
Legacy Fighting Alliance 146: Barbosa vs. Santos
- Promotion: Legacy Fighting Alliance
- Date: November 4, 2022
- Venue: Ginásio do Polvilho
- City: Cajamar, Brazil

Legacy Fighting Alliance 146: Barbosa vs. Santos is a mixed martial arts event promoted by Legacy Fighting Alliance and will take place on November 4, 2022. It aired on UFC Fight Pass.

=== Background ===
The event was headlined by a featherweight bout between Márcio Barbosa and the undefeated Gabriel Santos.

=== Results ===
Main Card
| Weight class | | | | Method | Round | Time | Notes |
|---|---|---|---|---|---|---|---|
| Featherweight | Gabriel Santos | def. | Márcio Barbosa | TKO (head kick and punches) | 2 | 0:09 | (Note: Barbosa missed weight (147 lbs)) |
| Lightweight | Felipe Douglas | def. | Rangel de Sá | Decision (unanimous) | 3 | 5:00 |
| Bantamweight | Jean Matsumoto | def. | Inaildo Santos | Decision (unanimous) | 3 | 5:00 |
| Welterweight | Carlos Prates | def. | Moacir Rocha | TKO (head kick and punches) | 1 | 4:15 | (Note: Rocha missed weight (174.6 lbs)) |
| Flyweight | Felipe dos Santos | def. | Hugo Paiva | Decision (unanimous) | 3 | 5:00 |
| Women's Flyweight | Luana Santos | def. | Waleska Sousa | Decision (unanimous) | 3 | 5:00 |
Preliminary Card
| Flyweight | Danilo Adreani | def. | Yan Teixeira | Submission (crossface) | 2 | 2:46 |
| Women's Strawweight | Janaína Silva | def. | Nayara Hemily | Decision (unanimous) | 3 | 5:00 |
| Women's Strawweight | Julia Polastri | def. | Bianca Sattelmayer | TKO | 3 | 0:51 |
| Welterweight | Reginaldo Junior | def. | Marcos Zinhani | Submission (rear-naked choke) | 1 | 2:21 | (Note: Zinhani missed weight (174.6 lbs)) |
| Catchweight (220 lbs) | Levi Rodrigues | def. | Leonardo Genuíno | TKO | 1 | 2:32 |
| Lightweight | Manuel Robson Minoto | def. | Allan Oliveira | TKO | 1 | 0:21 |
| Women's Strawweight | Gabriela Fujimoto | def. | Gabrielle Campelo | TKO | 3 | 2:37 |

== Legacy Fighting Alliance 147: Melo vs. Costa ==
Legacy Fighting Alliance 147: Melo vs. Costa
- Promotion: Legacy Fighting Alliance
- Date: November 18, 2022
- Venue: WinnaVegas Casino Resort
- City: Sloan, Iowa, United States

Legacy Fighting Alliance 147: Melo vs. Costa is a mixed martial arts event promoted by Legacy Fighting Alliance and will take place on November 18, 2022. It aired on UFC Fight Pass.

=== Background ===
The event was headlined by a lightweight bout between Junior Melo and Melquizael Costa.

=== Results ===
Main Card
| Weight class | | | | Method | Round | Time | Notes |
|---|---|---|---|---|---|---|---|
| Lightweight | Melquizael Costa | def. | Junior Melo | TKO (punches) | 3 | 2:00 | (Note: Melo missed weight (156.6 lbs)) |
| Bantamweight | Rafael do Nascimento | def. | Justin Wetzell | KO (punches) | 2 | 0:26 |
| Bantamweight | Askar Askar | def. | Rickey Furar | TKO (punches) | 2 | 4:37 |
| Women's Flyweight | Helen Peralta | def. | Aline Pereira | Decision (unanimous) | 3 | 5:00 |
| Welterweight | Haris Talundžić | def. | Omoyele Gonzalez | Submission (rear-naked choke) | 1 | 4:34 |
| Welterweight | Ryan Leininger | def. | Jeremiah Curtright | Decision (unanimous) | 3 | 5:00 |
Preliminary Card
| Lightweight | William Starks | def. | Ben Halder | TKO (elbows and punches) | 1 | 4:55 |
| Women's Strawweight | Leslie Hernandez | def. | Jasmine Pouncy | TKO (body kick and punches) | 1 | 0:47 |
| Women's Strawweight | Amanda Macioce | def. | Jasmine Montoya | TKO (punches) | 1 | 0:20 |

== Legacy Fighting Alliance 148: Leyva vs. Brown ==
Legacy Fighting Alliance 148: Leyva vs. Brown
- Promotion: Legacy Fighting Alliance
- Date: December 9, 2022
- Venue: The Commerce Casino & Hotel
- City: Commerce, California, United States

Legacy Fighting Alliance 148: Leyva vs. Brown is a mixed martial arts event promoted by Legacy Fighting Alliance and will take place on December 9, 2022. It aired on UFC Fight Pass.

=== Fight card ===
Main card
| Weight class | | | | Method | Round | Time | Notes |
|---|---|---|---|---|---|---|---|
| Welterweight | Chris Brown | def. | Alfonso Leyva | KO (body kick) | 1 | 3:02 | (Note: For the vacant LFA Welterweight Championship.) |
| Featherweight | Canaan Kawaihae | def. | Danny Silva | Decision (majority) | 3 | 5:00 |
| Lightweight | Richie Miranda | def. | James Wilson | Decision (split) | 3 | 5:00 |
| Women's Flyweight | Dione Barbosa | def. | Mariana Picco | Decision (unanimous) | 3 | 5:00 |
| Flyweight | Cody Davis | def. | Alvaro Prado | Submission (rear-naked choke) | 1 | 2:53 | (Note: Prado missed weight (127.4 lbs)) |
Preliminary card
| Welterweight | Ernesto Rodriguez | def. | Jeffrey Craig | Decision (unanimous) | 3 | 5:00 |
| Bantamweight | Eduardo Penha | def. | Joseph Dorado | Decision (unanimous) | 3 | 5:00 |
| Flyweight | David Secaida | def. | Qudratullah Babakar Khil | Decision (unanimous) | 3 | 5:00 |

== See also ==
- 2022 in UFC
- 2022 in Bellator MMA
- 2022 in ONE Championship
- 2022 in Absolute Championship Akhmat
- 2022 in Konfrontacja Sztuk Walki
- 2022 in Rizin Fighting Federation
- 2022 in LUX Fight League
- 2022 in AMC Fight Nights
- 2022 in Brave Combat Federation
- 2022 in Road FC
- 2022 Professional Fighters League season
- 2022 in Eagle Fighting Championship
