= UFC on ESPN: Dariush vs. Tsarukyan =

2023 mixed martial event in Texas, US

- The poster for UFC on ESPN: Dariush vs. Tsarukyan
- Promotion: Ultimate Fighting Championship
- Date: December 2, 2023
- Venue: Moody Center
- City: Austin, Texas, United States
- Attendance: 14,485
- Total gate: $2,450,000

Event chronology
UFC Fight Night: Allen vs. Craig	UFC on ESPN: Dariush vs. Tsarukyan	UFC Fight Night: Song vs. Gutiérrez

UFC on ESPN: Dariush vs. Tsarukyan (also known as UFC on ESPN 52) was a mixed martial arts event produced by the Ultimate Fighting Championship that took place on December 2, 2023, at the Moody Center in Austin, Texas, United States.

== Background ==
This event was originally targeted to take place at the Target Center in Minneapolis, Minnesota. However the event was instead moved to the Moody Center in Austin, Texas for unspecified reasons. This also marked the promotion's fifth visit to Austin and first since UFC on ESPN: Kattar vs. Emmett in June 2022.

A lightweight bout between Beneil Dariush and Arman Tsarukyan headlined the event.

A five round lightweight bout between Bobby Green and Dan Hooker was expected take place in the co-main event, which would have marked the sixth time a non-main event and non-title bout has been scheduled for five rounds. However, the week before the event, Hooker withdrew due to a broken arm and was replaced by Jalin Turner in a three round bout.

A middleweight bout between former UFC Middleweight Championship challenger Jared Cannonier and Roman Dolidze was expected to take place at the event. However, Cannonier suffered a MCL tear in October during training and the bout was cancelled.

A light heavyweight bout between Azamat Murzakanov and Khalil Rountree Jr. was expected to take place at the event. However, Murzakanov was diagnosed with pneumonia and pulled from the event. Rountree was instead matched up with former UFC Light Heavyweight Championship challenger Anthony Smith at UFC Fight Night: Song vs. Gutiérrez a week later.

A featherweight bout between Steve Garcia and Melquizael Costa was expected to take place at the event. However, the bout was scrapped when Garcia withdrew the day before due to illness. The bout was rescheduled for UFC Fight Night: Song vs. Gutiérrez a week later.

== Results ==
Main card (ESPN / ESPN+)
Weight class				Method	Round	Time	Notes
Lightweight	Arman Tsarukyan	def.	Beneil Dariush	KO (knee and punches)	1	1:04
Lightweight	Jalin Turner	def.	Bobby Green	KO (punches)	1	2:49
Bantamweight	Deiveson Figueiredo	def.	Rob Font	Decision (unanimous) (30–27, 30–27, 30–27)	3	5:00
Welterweight	Sean Brady	def.	Kelvin Gastelum	Submission (kimura)	3	1:43
Lightweight	Joaquim Silva	def.	Clay Guida	Decision (unanimous) (29–28, 29–28, 29–28)	3	5:00
Middleweight	Dustin Stoltzfus	def.	Punahele Soriano	Submission (rear-naked choke)	2	4:10
Preliminary card (ESPN+)
Women's Bantamweight	Miesha Tate	def.	Julia Avila	Submission (face crank)	3	1:15
Middleweight	Cody Brundage	def.	Zachary Reese	KO (slam and punches)	1	1:49
Lightweight	Drakkar Klose	def.	Joe Solecki	KO (slam)	1	1:41
Light Heavyweight	Rodolfo Bellato	def.	Ihor Potieria	TKO (punches)	2	4:17
Welterweight	Jared Gooden	def.	Wellington Turman	Submission (rear-naked choke)	2	1:11
Women's Flyweight	Veronica Hardy	def.	Jamey-Lyn Horth	Decision (split) (29–28, 28–29, 29–28)	3	5:00

== Bonus awards ==
The following fighters received $50,000 bonuses.

- Fight of the Night: Rodolfo Bellato vs. Ihor Potieria
- Performance of the Night: Arman Tsarukyan, Jalin Turner, Sean Brady, Dustin Stoltzfus, Miesha Tate, Cody Brundage, Drakkar Klose, and Jared Gooden

== See also ==
- 2023 in UFC
- List of current UFC fighters
- List of UFC events
