= UFC on ESPN: Royval vs. Kape =

Mixed martial arts event in 2025

- The poster for UFC on ESPN: Royval vs. Kape
- Promotion: Ultimate Fighting Championship
- Date: December 13, 2025
- Venue: UFC Apex
- City: Enterprise, Nevada, United States
- Attendance: Not announced

Event chronology
UFC 323: Dvalishvili vs. Yan 2	UFC on ESPN: Royval vs. Kape	UFC 324: Gaethje vs. Pimblett

UFC on ESPN: Royval vs. Kape (also known as UFC on ESPN 73 and UFC Vegas 112) was a mixed martial arts event produced by the Ultimate Fighting Championship that took place on December 13, 2025, at the UFC Apex in Enterprise, Nevada, part of the Las Vegas Valley, United States.

== Background ==
This event was the final UFC broadcast under the U.S. media rights agreement with ESPN as beginning in 2026, UFC live event coverage will transition to Paramount Skydance.

A flyweight bout between former UFC Flyweight Championship challenger (also former LFA Flyweight Champion) Brandon Royval and former RIZIN Bantamweight Champion Manel Kape headlined the event. The pairing was originally expected to headline UFC Fight Night: Kape vs. Almabayev in March 2025, but Royval had to withdraw due to multiple concussions. They were later rebooked to compete at UFC 317 in June 2025; however, Kape withdrew due to a broken foot.

A women's flyweight bout between former LFA Women's Flyweight Champion Jamey-Lyn Horth and Tereza Bledá took place at this event. They were originally scheduled to compete at UFC on ESPN: Usman vs. Buckley in June but Bledá was forced to withdraw from the fight due to a staph infection.

A women's bantamweight bout between Luana Santos and Melissa Croden took place at this event. The pairing was originally set for UFC on ESPN: Bonfim vs. Brown in November, but was moved to this card for undisclosed reasons.

A women's strawweight bout between Gillian Robertson and Iasmin Lucindo was scheduled for this event. However, Lucindo withdrew due to an undisclosed injury and was replaced by former UFC Women's Strawweight Championship challenger Amanda Lemos. Subsequently, Lemos was removed from the card by the Nevada State Athletic Commission on the day of the event due to a mouth injury and the bout was rescheduled for March 14, 2026, at UFC Fight Night 269.

Melsik Baghdasaryan was expected to face Joanderson Brito in a featherweight bout. However, Baghdasaryan pulled out for undisclosed reasons and was replaced by promotional newcomer Isaac Thomson. Baghdasaryan and Brito had previously been scheduled to meet in October 2022 at UFC Fight Night: Grasso vs. Araújo, but Baghdasaryan pulled out of that bout due to a broken hand.

== Results ==
Main card (ESPN2 / ESPN+)
Weight class				Method	Round	Time	Notes
Flyweight	Manel Kape	def.	Brandon Royval	KO (punches)	1	3:18
Featherweight	Kevin Vallejos	def.	Giga Chikadze	KO (spinning backfist and elbows)	2	1:29
Middleweight	Cezary Oleksiejczuk	def.	César Almeida	Decision (unanimous) (30–27, 30–27, 30–27)	3	5:00
Featherweight	Melquizael Costa	def.	Morgan Charrière	KO (head kick)	1	1:14
Heavyweight	Kennedy Nzechukwu	vs.	Marcus Buchecha	Draw (unanimous) (28–28, 28–28, 28–28)	3	5:00	(Note: Nzechukwu was deducted one point in round 2 due to an eye poke.)
Catchweight (160 lb)	King Green	def.	Lance Gibson Jr.	Decision (split) (29–28, 28–29, 29–28)	3	5:00
Preliminary card (ESPN2 / ESPN+)
Welterweight	Yaroslav Amosov	def.	Neil Magny	Submission (anaconda choke)	1	3:14
Featherweight	Joanderson Brito	def.	Isaac Thomson	Decision (unanimous) (29–28, 29–28, 29–28)	3	5:00
Heavyweight	Steven Asplund	def.	Sean Sharaf	TKO (punches)	2	3:49
Women's Bantamweight	Luana Santos	def.	Melissa Croden	Decision (unanimous) (29–28, 29–28, 30–27)	3	5:00
Heavyweight	Guilherme Pat	def.	Allen Frye Jr.	Decision (unanimous) (30–27, 30–27, 30–27)	3	5:00
Women's Flyweight	Jamey-Lyn Horth	def.	Tereza Bledá	TKO (punches)	1	2:05

== Bonus awards ==
The following fighters received $50,000 bonuses.

- Fight of the Night: Steven Asplund vs. Sean Sharaf
- Performance of the Night: Manel Kape and Kevin Vallejos

== See also ==
- 2025 in UFC
- List of current UFC fighters
- List of UFC events
