= Mike Egger =

Swiss politician (born 1992)

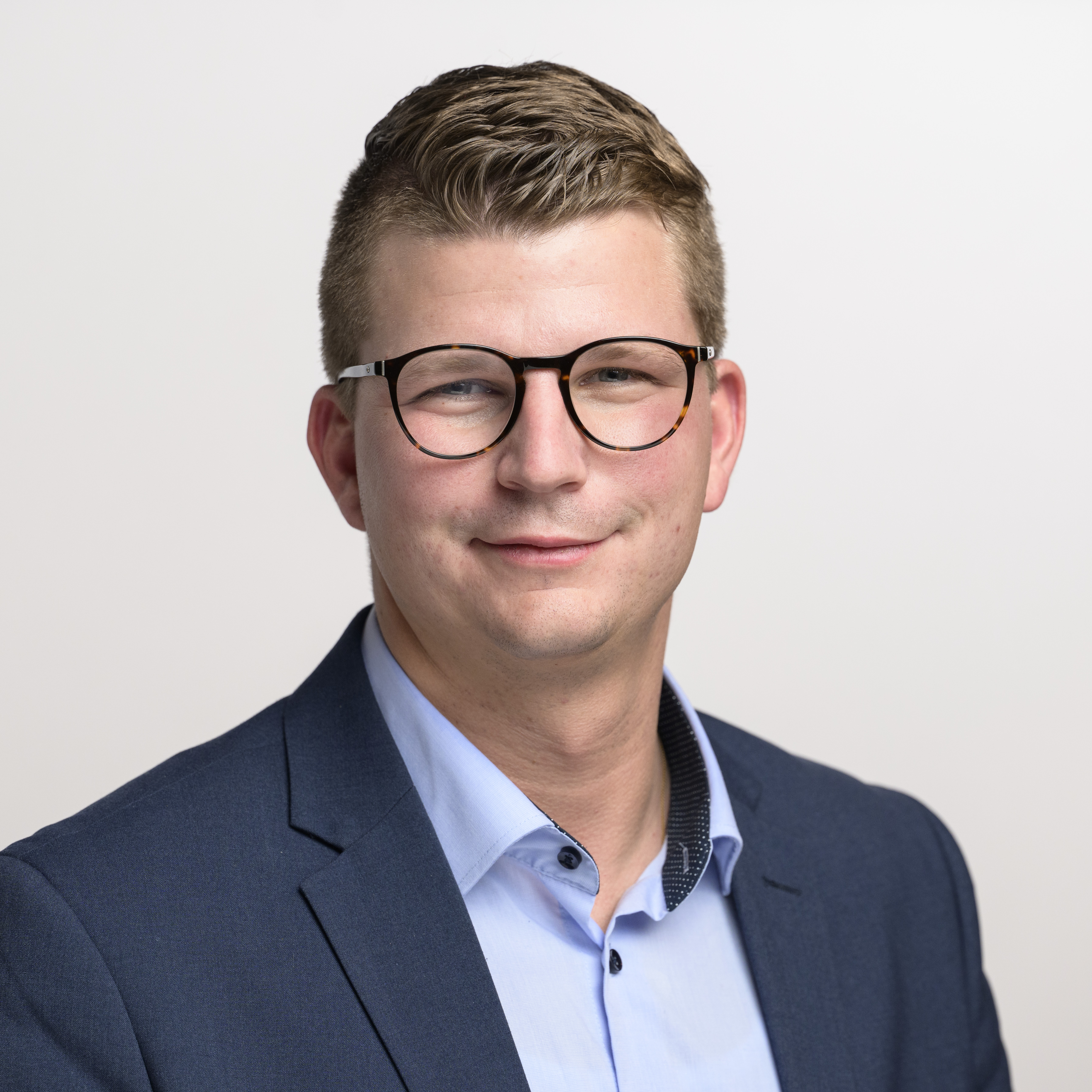
- Official portrait, 2023

Member of the National Council (Switzerland)
- Incumbent
- Assumed office 2 December 2019
- Constituency: Canton of St. Gallen

Member of the Cantonal Council of St. Gallen
- In office 11 March 2012 – 31 February 2017

Personal details
- Born: Mike Andreas Egger; 2 August 1992 (age 33) Rorschach, Switzerland
- Spouse: Lisa Vincenz (m. 2025)
- Relations: Stephanie Egger (sister); Susanne Vincenz-Stauffacher (mother-in-law)
- Website: Parliament website Official website

Military service
- Allegiance: Switzerland
- Branch/service: Swiss Armed Forces
- Rank: Soldier

Mike Andreas Egger (/ˈɛɡər/; born 2 August 1992) is a Swiss politician who currently serves as a member of the National Council (Switzerland) for the Swiss People's Party since 2019. He previously served on the Cantonal Council of St. Gallen representing the Rheintal district from 2012 to 2017.

== Early life and education ==
Egger was born 2 August 1992 in Rorschach, Switzerland to Peter and Rita Egger, into a third-generation butchers family and was raised with three sisters, including Stephanie Egger. His father was the innkeeper of Braui Berneck in the second generation.

He completed a trade apprenticeship as butcher in Disentis of which he graduated with distinction in June 2011. He also completed several federal diplomas and studied Economics at the University of Applied Sciences of the Grisons (FHGR) completing with an Executive Master of Business Administration in 2020.

== Career ==
Following the training, he was employed by a meat processor Micarna in 2014 and became a board member of St Gallen – Liechtenstein Meat Association in 2016.

== Political career ==
His interest in politics aroused in 2013 at a youth parliamentary session he attended. Later he joined Young SVP group in the Canton of St Gallen and chaired the group from 2012 to 2016. While holding this position, he was elected to the Cantonal Council and served in the council until February 2019. In the 2015 parliamentary election, Egger ran on the ticket of SVP for the National Council but lost by 600 votes to his opponent. Following the resignation of Toni Brunner from parliament in November 2018, Egger was inaugurated to the National Council in March 2019.

He ran for a Council of State seat in January and March 2019 to succeed Karin Keller-Sutter but lost in both elections as he placed third position. He was elected to the parliament in the October 2019 parliamentary elections and was appointed to the committees on Environment, Spatial Planning and Energy, Sports and Finance.

== Personal life ==
On 2 May 2025, Egger married Lisa Vincenz (born 1994), a daughter of Reto Vincenz and Susanne Vincenz-Stauffacher, who also serves on the National Council (Switzerland) for The Liberals, in a civil ceremony.
