= UFC Fight Night: Song vs. Gutiérrez =

2023 mixed martial arts event

- The poster for UFC Fight Night: Song vs. Gutiérrez
- Promotion: Ultimate Fighting Championship
- Date: December 9, 2023
- Venue: UFC Apex
- City: Enterprise, Nevada, United States
- Attendance: Not announced

Event chronology
UFC on ESPN: Dariush vs. Tsarukyan	UFC Fight Night: Song vs. Gutiérrez	UFC 296: Edwards vs. Covington

UFC Fight Night: Song vs. Gutiérrez (also known as UFC Fight Night 233, UFC on ESPN+ 91 and UFC Vegas 83) was a mixed martial arts event produced by the Ultimate Fighting Championship that took place on December 9, 2023, at the UFC Apex facility in Enterprise, Nevada, part of the Las Vegas Metropolitan Area, United States.

== Background ==
The event was to mark the promotion's second visit to Shanghai and first since UFC Fight Night: Bisping vs. Gastelum in November 2017. It was to be the first time since the COVID-19 pandemic that the UFC has returned to Mainland China. However in mid-November 2023, the event was moved to the UFC Apex due to undisclosed reasons.

A bantamweight bout between Song Yadong and Chris Gutiérrez headlined the event.

The four finals of the Road to UFC Season 2 were expected to take place at this event. However, they were pulled from this event due to the change of location.

A light heavyweight bout between Zhang Mingyang and Brendson Ribeiro was scheduled for the event. However, the bout was postponed due to the change of location and fighters facing visa issues and rescheduled for UFC 298.

Steve Garcia and Melquizael Costa were expected to meet in a featherweight bout a week earlier at UFC on ESPN: Dariush vs. Tsarukyan, but the pairing was scrapped when Garcia withdrew the day before due to illness. They were rescheduled for this event.

A flyweight bout between Su Mudaerji and Allan Nascimento was expected to take place at the event. However, Nascimento withdrew from the fight due to injury and was replaced by former UFC Flyweight Championship challenger (also The Ultimate Fighter: Tournament of Champions flyweight winner) Tim Elliott in a bantamweight bout.

A catchweight bout of 140 pounds between Daniel Marcos and Carlos Vera was scheduled for the event. However, the bout was cancelled due to visa issues on Marcos' side.

At the weigh-ins, Luana Santos weighed in at 139 pounds, three pounds over the bantamweight non-title fight limit. Her bout proceeded at catchweight with Santos being fined 20% of her purse which went to her opponent Stephanie Egger.

== Results ==
Main card (ESPN+)
Weight class				Method	Round	Time	Notes
Bantamweight	Song Yadong	def.	Chris Gutiérrez	Decision (unanimous) (50–44, 50–45, 50–45)	5	5:00
Light Heavyweight	Khalil Rountree Jr.	def.	Anthony Smith	TKO (punches)	3	0:56
Lightweight	Nasrat Haqparast	def.	Jamie Mullarkey	TKO (punches)	1	1:44
Bantamweight	Tim Elliott	def.	Su Mudaerji	Technical Submission (arm-triangle choke)	1	4:02
Middleweight	André Muniz	def.	Park Jun-yong	Decision (split) (29–28, 28–29, 29–28)	3	5:00
Preliminary card (ESPN+)
Welterweight	Kevin Jousset	def.	Song Kenan	Decision (unanimous) (30–27, 30–27, 30–27)	3	5:00
Flyweight	Park Hyun-sung	def.	Shannon Ross	TKO (knee and punches)	2	3:59
Lightweight	Steve Garcia	def.	Melquizael Costa	KO (elbows)	2	1:01
Catchweight (139 lb)	Luana Santos	def.	Stephanie Egger	Decision (unanimous) (30–27, 29–28, 29–28)	3	5:00
Flyweight	Tatsuro Taira	def.	Carlos Hernandez	TKO (punches)	2	0:55
Women's Strawweight	Talita Alencar	def.	Rayanne dos Santos	Decision (split) (29–28, 28–29, 29–28)	3	5:00

== Bonus awards ==
The following fighters received $50,000 bonuses.

- Fight of the Night: No bonus awarded.
- Performance of the Night: Khalil Rountree Jr., Nasrat Haqparast, Tim Elliott, and Park Hyun-sung.

== See also ==
- 2023 in UFC
- List of current UFC fighters
- List of UFC events
