= UFC Fight Night: Allen vs. Craig =

2023 mixed martial event in Nevada, US

- The poster for UFC Fight Night: Allen vs. Craig
- Promotion: Ultimate Fighting Championship
- Date: November 18, 2023
- Venue: UFC Apex
- City: Enterprise, Nevada, United States
- Attendance: Not announced

Event chronology
UFC 295: Procházka vs. Pereira	UFC Fight Night: Allen vs. Craig	UFC on ESPN: Dariush vs. Tsarukyan

UFC Fight Night: Allen vs. Craig (also known as UFC Fight Night 232, UFC on ESPN+ 90 and UFC Vegas 82) was a mixed martial arts event produced by the Ultimate Fighting Championship that took place on November 18, 2023, at the UFC Apex facility in Enterprise, Nevada, part of the Las Vegas Metropolitan Area, United States.

== Background ==
A middleweight bout between former LFA Middleweight Champion Brendan Allen and Paul Craig headlined the event.

A featherweight bout between Jeka Saragih and Jesse Butler was scheduled for this event. However, Butler withdrew due to injury and was briefly replaced by Charlie Campbell. The promotion then announced that Lucas Alexander would step in and face Saragih instead. At the weigh-ins, Alexander weighed in at 148 pounds, two pounds over the featherweight non-title fight limit. The bout proceeded at catchweight with Alexander being fined 20% of his purse which went to Saragih.

A middleweight bout between promotional newcomer César Almeida and Christian Leroy Duncan was scheduled for the event. However, Almeida was pulled out from the event for medical reasons. He was replaced by Denis Tiuliulin.

Jonny Parsons was expected to face Uroš Medić in a welterweight bout at the event. However, Parsons was pulled out due to undisclosed reasons and was replaced by promotional newcomer Myktybek Orolbai.

At the weigh-ins, Rafael Estevam weighed in at 128 pounds, two pounds over the flyweight non-title fight limit. The fight proceeded at catchweight with Estevam being fined 20% of his purse which went to his opponent Charles Johnson.

== Results ==
Main card (ESPN+)
Weight class				Method	Round	Time	Notes
Middleweight	Brendan Allen	def.	Paul Craig	Submission (rear-naked choke)	3	0:38
Welterweight	Michael Morales	def.	Jake Matthews	Decision (unanimous) (30–27, 29–28, 29–28)	3	5:00
Lightweight	Chase Hooper	def.	Jordan Leavitt	Submission (rear-naked choke)	1	2:58
Bantamweight	Payton Talbott	def.	Nick Aguirre	Submission (rear-naked choke)	3	0:58
Women's Strawweight	Amanda Ribas	def.	Luana Pinheiro	TKO (spinning wheel kick and punches)	3	3:53
Welterweight	Myktybek Orolbai	def.	Uroš Medić	Submission (neck crank)	2	4:12
Preliminary card (ESPN+)
Featherweight	Joanderson Brito	def.	Jonathan Pearce	Submission (ninja choke)	2	3:54
Bantamweight	Jose Johnson	def.	Chad Anheliger	Submission (rear-naked choke)	3	4:49
Middleweight	Christian Leroy Duncan	def.	Denis Tiuliulin	TKO (punches and elbows)	2	4:24
Heavyweight	Mick Parkin	def.	Caio Machado	Decision (unanimous) (29–28, 29–28, 29–28)	3	5:00
Catchweight (148 lb)	Jeka Saragih	def.	Lucas Alexander	KO (punches)	1	1:31
Women's Bantamweight	Ailín Pérez	def.	Lucie Pudilová	Decision (unanimous) (29–27, 29–28, 29–28)	3	5:00
Lightweight	Trey Ogden	vs.	Nikolas Motta	No Contest (premature stoppage)	3	3:11	(Note: Originally a technical submission (arm-triangle choke) win for Ogden; overturned after review due to a referee error.)
Catchweight (128 lb)	Rafael Estevam	def.	Charles Johnson	Decision (unanimous) (29–28, 29–28, 29–28)	3	5:00

== Bonus awards ==
The following fighters received $50,000 bonuses.

- Fight of the Night: No bonus awarded.
- Performance of the Night: Brendan Allen, Amanda Ribas, Joanderson Brito, and Jeka Saragih

== See also ==
- 2023 in UFC
- List of current UFC fighters
- List of UFC events
