= Luana Santos =

Brazilian mixed martial artist (born 2000)

- Santos in 2025
- Born: Luana do Valle Lopes Gonzalez Santos; 16 April 2000 (age 26)
- Height: 5 ft 6 in (1.68 m)
- Weight: 135 lb (61 kg; 9 st 9 lb)
- Division: Flyweight; Bantamweight
- Reach: 67 in (170 cm)
- Fighting out of: São Paulo, Brazil
- Team: 011 MMA Team; Team Lucas Mineiro
- Years active: 2021–present

Mixed martial arts record
- Total: 14
- Wins: 12
- By knockout: 1
- By submission: 5
- By decision: 6
- Losses: 2
- By decision: 2

Other information
- Mixed martial arts record from Sherdog

Luana do Valle Lopes Gonzalez Santos (born 16 April 2000) is a Brazilian professional mixed martial artist. She competes in the women's bantamweight division of the Ultimate Fighting Championship (UFC). As of 31 October 2026, she is #3 in the Meta UFC women's bantamweight rankings.

== Early life ==
Santos was born on 16 April 2000, and grew up in São Paulo, Brazil. She began competing in judo at age eight, following after her father who also competed in the sport. Santos grew up a fan of Ronda Rousey and has been nicknamed the "Brazilian Ronda" based on her judo background and similar fighting style. As a judoka, she made the national team and won a Continental Cup gold medal at the 2017 Cadet European Cup. Santos participated in several international tournaments, including in Croatia and Germany. At age 18, she became a black belt.

== Mixed martial arts career ==
=== Early career ===
Santos became a mixed martial artist by chance. She has explained that "I was watching a UFC event at a friend's house and her father was there with a friend ... I joked that I would do that one day, and her father's friend asked if it was for real. I said I'd do it, but never imagined it would go beyond that." She was invited to train at the 011 MMA gym in São Paulo by the friend, who knew the team's owner. "I did one MMA training and never stopped since", she said.

Santos competed in her first MMA fight on the amateur level on 27 April 2019, under the SFT promotion, and won against Karine Cristine by unanimous decision.

Santos won two more amateur bouts, one by technical knockout (TKO) and one by decision, before winning her first professional fight on 15 July 2021, by submission against Marjorie Barragan.

Santos defeated Djulia Ariana by unanimous decision on 18 December 2021, and then Beatriz Ferreira by submission on 30 April 2022.

Afterwards, Santos was signed by the Legacy Fighting Alliance (LFA), competing as a flyweight. In her first fight under the LFA promotion, she lost by split decision to Jena Bishop on 8 July 2022, the first loss of her career. Santos later defeated Waleska Sousa on 4 November 2022, by unanimous decision, and Bartira Rodrigues on 10 March 2023, by technical submission.

=== Ultimate Fighting Championship ===
In June 2023, it was reported that Santos signed with the Ultimate Fighting Championship.

Santos faced Juliana Miller on 12 August 2023, at UFC on ESPN 51. She won the fight via a first-round knockout, the first knockout of her professional career.

Santos faced Stephanie Egger in a bantamweight bout on 9 December 2023, at UFC Fight Night 233. At the weigh-ins, Santos weighed in at 139 pounds, three pounds over the bantamweight non-title fight limit. Her bout proceeded at catchweight with Santos being fined 20% of her purse which went to Egger. Santos won the fight by unanimous decision.

Santos faced Mariya Agapova on 13 July 2024, at UFC on ESPN 59. She won the fight by a rear-naked choke in the first round.

Replacing Tereza Bledá, Santos faced Casey O'Neill on 17 August 2024, at UFC 305. She lost the fight by unanimous decision.

Moving up to bantamweight, Santos faced Tainara Lisboa on 17 May 2025, at UFC Fight Night 256. She won the fight via a keylock in the second round.

Santos was scheduled to face Darya Zheleznyakova on 8 November 2025, at UFC Fight Night 264. However, Zheleznyakova withdrew from the fight for unknown reasons and was replaced by Melissa Croden. In turn, the bout was moved to UFC on ESPN 73 on 13 December 2025. She won the fight by unanimous decision.

Santos faced Karol Rosa on 20 June 2026, at UFC Fight Night 279. She won the fight by unanimous decision.

Santos faced Yana Santos on 31 October 2026, at UFC Fight Night 292. She won the fight by unanimous decision.

== Mixed martial arts record ==
Professional record breakdown
14 matches	12 wins	2 losses
By knockout	1	0
By submission	5	0
By decision	6	2

Res.	Record	Opponent	Method	Event	Date	Round	Time	Location	Notes
Win	12–2	Yana Santos	Decision (unanimous)	UFC Fight Night: Moicano vs. Nolan	31 October 2026	3	5:00	Las Vegas, Nevada, United States	
Win	11–2	Karol Rosa	Decision (unanimous)	UFC Fight Night: Kape vs. Horiguchi	20 June 2026	3	5:00	Las Vegas, Nevada, United States	
Win	10–2	Melissa Croden	Decision (unanimous)	UFC on ESPN: Royval vs. Kape	13 December 2025	3	5:00	Las Vegas, Nevada, United States	
Win	9–2	Tainara Lisboa	Submission (keylock)	UFC Fight Night: Burns vs. Morales	17 May 2025	2	4:59	Las Vegas, Nevada, United States	Return to Bantamweight.
Loss	8–2	Casey O'Neill	Decision (unanimous)	UFC 305	17 August 2024	3	5:00	Perth, Australia	
Win	8–1	Mariya Agapova	Submission (rear-naked choke)	UFC on ESPN: Namajunas vs. Cortez	13 July 2024	1	3:27	Denver, Colorado, United States	
Win	7–1	Stephanie Egger	Decision (unanimous)	UFC Fight Night: Song vs. Gutiérrez	9 December 2023	3	5:00	Las Vegas, Nevada, United States	Bantamweight bout; Santos missed weight (139 lb).
Win	6–1	Juliana Miller	TKO (punches)	UFC on ESPN: Luque vs. dos Anjos	12 August 2023	1	3:41	Las Vegas, Nevada, United States	
Win	5–1	Bartira Rodrigues	Technical Submission (guillotine choke)	LFA 154	10 March 2023	1	3:05	Cajamar, Brazil	
Win	4–1	Waleska Sousa	Decision (unanimous)	LFA 146	4 November 2022	3	5:00	Cajamar, Brazil	
Loss	3–1	Jena Bishop	Decision (split)	LFA 135	8 July 2022	3	5:00	Phoenix, Arizona, United States	Flyweight debut.
Win	3–0	Beatriz Ferreira	Submission (keylock)	Standout Fighting Tournament 34	30 April 2022	3	0:26	São Paulo, Brazil	
Win	2–0	Djulia Ariana	Decision (unanimous)	Standout Fighting Tournament 32	18 December 2021	3	5:00	São Paulo, Brazil	
Win	1–0	Marjorie Barragan	Submission (scarf hold armlock)	Standout Fighting Tournament 27	15 July 2021	1	3:19	São Paulo, Brazil	Bantamweight debut.

== See also ==
- List of current UFC fighters
- List of female mixed martial artists
