= Stephanie Egger =

Swiss mixed martial artist

- Born: August 12, 1988 (age 38); St. Gallen, Switzerland
- Height: 5 ft 6 in (1.68 m)
- Weight: 135 lb (61 kg; 9 st 9 lb)
- Division: Bantamweight (2015–present); Featherweight (2015, 2022)
- Reach: 68.0 in (173 cm)
- Style: Judo
- Fighting out of: St. Gallen, Switzerland
- Team: Buddy Gym
- Rank: Black belt in judo
- Years active: Until 2013 (judo); 2015–present (MMA)

Mixed martial arts record
- Total: 14
- Wins: 8
- By knockout: 3
- By submission: 4
- By decision: 1
- Losses: 6
- By knockout: 1
- By submission: 2
- By decision: 3

Other information
- Notable relatives: Mike Egger, brother
- Mixed martial arts record from Sherdog

Stephanie Egger (born August 12, 1988) is a Swiss female mixed martial artist who competed in the Bantamweight division of the Ultimate Fighting Championship.

== Background ==
Egger grew up in St. Gallen, Switzerland, with three siblings, one of whom is Swiss politician Mike Egger.

Egger started training judo at the age of five, ultimately becoming a black belt in the discipline. She won the 2010 European U23 Championships and was the Swiss Judo champion in the +63 kg category in 2011, 2012, and 2013. She then retired from judo competition due to nagging injuries, and found mixed martial arts by way of grappling and boxing training. Egger also won the ADCC European Trial in 2019 at 60 kg. The longtime black belt competed in the 2019 ADCC World Championships where she went to a decision with Gabi Garcia.

In addition to the many hours of training every day, Stephanie Egger works in the family restaurant in Berneck.

== Mixed martial arts career ==
=== Early career ===
After winning her first two bouts against Judith Ruis and Mara Romero Borella via first round stoppage, her next fight was on November 18, 2016, at Invicta FC 20: Evinger vs. Kunitskaya against Alexa Conners and she lost the fight via a split decision.

Egger faced Eeva Siiskonen at Buddy MMA Clash 2 on March 31, 2018. She won the bout via TKO in the first round.

Egger faced Reina Miura, in a 138 lbs catchweight bout, at Rizin 17 on July 28, 2019. Egger won the fight by unanimous decision.

=== Ultimate Fighting Championship ===
Egger, as a replacement for Bea Malecki, made her UFC debut against Tracy Cortez on October 11, 2020 at UFC Fight Night: Moraes vs. Sandhagen. Egger lost the fight via unanimous decision.

Egger was scheduled to face Sarah Alpar on May 22, 2021, at UFC Fight Night: Font vs. Garbrandt. However, Egger pulled out due to undisclosed reasons in the week leading up to the event.

Egger faced Shanna Young on October 2, 2021, at UFC Fight Night: Santos vs. Walker. She won the fight via technical knockout in round two.

Egger faced Jessica-Rose Clark on February 19, 2022, at UFC Fight Night 201. She won the fight via an armbar submission in the first round. The win earned Egger her first Performance of the Night bonus award.

Egger faced Mayra Bueno Silva on August 6, 2022, at UFC on ESPN 40. She lost the fight via an armbar submission in round one.

Egger faced Ailín Pérez, replacing Zarah Fairn Dos Santos, on September 3, 2022, at UFC Fight Night 209. She won the fight via a rear-naked choke in round two.

Egger faced Irina Alekseeva on April 29, 2023, at UFC on ESPN: Song vs. Simón. She lost the fight via knee bar in round one.

Egger was scheduled face Montana De La Rosa at UFC Fight Night 229 on October 7, 2023. However, Egger pulled out for undisclosed reasons and was replaced by JJ Aldrich.

Egger faced Luana Santos on January 13, 2024, at UFC Fight Night 234. She lost the fight via unanimous decision.

On February 16, 2024, it was reported that Egger was removed from the UFC roster.

=== Oktagon MMA ===
On October 24, 2025, it was reported that Egger signed with Oktagon MMA and she was scheduled to make his debut against Veronika Smolková on December 28, 2025, at Oktagon 81. However, Egger pulled out from the bout due to an illness and was replaced by another newcomer Marta Sós.

== Championships and accomplishments ==
=== Grappling ===
- 2016: ADCC European Championship — (gold) in +60 kg category (Mainz)
- 2019: ADCC European Championship — (gold) in +60 kg class (Poznań)

=== Judo ===
- European U23 Judo Championships
  - 2010 European U23 Judo Championships — (gold) in –70 kg category (Sarajevo)

=== Mixed martial arts ===
- Ultimate Fighting Championship
  - Performance of the Night (One time) vs. Jessica-Rose Clark

== Mixed martial arts record ==
Professional record breakdown
14 matches	8 wins	6 losses
By knockout	3	1
By submission	4	2
By decision	1	3

Res.	Record	Opponent	Method	Event	Date	Round	Time	Location	Notes
Loss	8–6	Veronika Smolková	TKO (punches)	Oktagon 85	March 7, 2026	1	2:34	Hamburg, Germany	Catchweight (131.6 lb) bout; Egger missed weight.
Loss	8–5	Luana Santos	Decision (unanimous)	UFC Fight Night: Song vs. Gutiérrez	December 9, 2023	3	5:00	Las Vegas, Nevada, United States	Catchweight (139 lb) bout; Santos missed weight.
Loss	8–4	Irina Alekseeva	Submission (kneebar)	UFC on ESPN: Song vs. Simón	April 29, 2023	1	2:11	Las Vegas, Nevada, United States	Catchweight (140 lb) bout; Alekseeva missed weight.
Win	8–3	Ailín Pérez	Submission (rear-naked choke)	UFC Fight Night: Gane vs. Tuivasa	September 3, 2022	2	4:54	Paris, France	Featherweight bout.
Loss	7–3	Mayra Bueno Silva	Submission (armbar)	UFC on ESPN: Santos vs. Hill	August 6, 2022	1	1:17	Las Vegas, Nevada, United States	
Win	7–2	Jessica-Rose Clark	Submission (armbar)	UFC Fight Night: Walker vs. Hill	February 19, 2022	1	3:44	Las Vegas, Nevada, United States	Performance of the Night.
Win	6–2	Shanna Young	TKO (elbow)	UFC Fight Night: Santos vs. Walker	October 2, 2021	2	2:22	Las Vegas, Nevada, United States	
Loss	5–2	Tracy Cortez	Decision (unanimous)	UFC Fight Night: Moraes vs. Sandhagen	October 11, 2020	3	5:00	Abu Dhabi, United Arab Emirates	
Win	5–1	Cinja Kiefer	Submission (rear-naked choke)	Buddy MMA Clash 3	September 5, 2020	1	2:41	St. Gallen, Switzerland	
Win	4–1	Reina Miura	Decision (unanimous)	Rizin 17	July 28, 2019	3	5:00	Saitama, Japan	Catchweight (139 lb) bout.
Win	3–1	Eeva Siiskonen	TKO (punches)	Buddy MMA Clash 2	March 31, 2018	1	2:07	St. Gallen, Switzerland	Catchweight (140 lb) bout.
Loss	2–1	Alexa Conners	Decision (split)	Invicta FC 20	November 18, 2016	3	5:00	Kansas City, Missouri, United States	
Win	2–0	Mara Romero Borella	TKO (corner stoppage)	Arena Fighting Games 1	October 4, 2015	1	5:00	Milan, Italy	Bantamweight debut.
Win	1–0	Judith Ruis	Submission (armbar)	Respect FC 14	September 19, 2015	1	1:30	Karlsruhe, Germany	Featherweight debut.

== See also ==
- List of female mixed martial artists
