= Melquizael Costa =

Brazilian mixed martial artist (born 1996)

- Born: Melquizael Costa da Conceição; September 14, 1996 (age 30); Porto de Moz, Pará, Brazil
- Nickname: The Dalmatian
- Height: 5 ft 10 in (178 cm)
- Weight: 145.5 lb (66 kg; 10 st 6 lb)
- Division: Featherweight (2014–present); Lightweight (2018–2023); Bantamweight (2016)
- Reach: 71 in (180 cm)
- Stance: Southpaw
- Fighting out of: Bauru, São Paulo, Brazil
- Team: Chute Boxe Bauru (2018–present)
- Trainer: João Emilio
- Rank: Black belt in Brazilian jiu-jitsu Black prajied in Muay Thai
- Years active: 2014–present

Mixed martial arts record
- Total: 35
- Wins: 27
- By knockout: 9
- By submission: 8
- By decision: 10
- Losses: 8
- By knockout: 2
- By submission: 2
- By decision: 4

Other information
- Mixed martial arts record from Sherdog

Melquizael Costa da Conceição (Portuguese pronunciation: [/mew.ki.za.ˈɛw ˈkɔs.tɐ dɐ kõ.sej.ˈsɐ̃w/]; born September 14, 1996), sometimes known as Melk Costa, is a Brazilian professional mixed martial artist. A professional since 2014, he currently competes in the Featherweight division of the Ultimate Fighting Championship (UFC). Costa formerly competed in the Legacy Fighting Alliance (LFA), Predator FC, SFT Combat, Titans FC, Future MMA, and SFC. As of November 7, 2026, he is #12 in the Meta UFC featherweight rankings.

== Background ==
Melquizael Costa da Conceição was born and raised in Porto de Moz, in the interior of Pará. At the age of four, he developed vitiligo, an autoimmune condition that causes the loss of skin pigmentation. During his childhood, Costa was the target of bullying and social isolation; many people in his town confused the condition with leprosy, which often led parents to keep their children away from him. The prejudice led him to hide his body under long-sleeved clothing and avoid social interactions.

At age 13, looking for a way to defend himself, Costa began training in boxing and, later, Brazilian jiu-jitsu. The gym environment became a refuge where he was welcomed by his training partners, which helped him accept his body. Initially, he faced financial hardships, even selling popsicles on the streets to balance his studies and pay for his training. The decision to focus on a professional MMA career was solidified after he saw former fighter Scott Jorgensen, who also has vitiligo, in a UFC video game, proving to Costa that reaching the promotion was possible. His biggest sports supporter was his older brother, Natanael, whose death in a workplace accident in 2013 pushed Costa to make his professional debut at age 17 to honor his memory.

== Mixed martial arts career ==
=== Early career ===
Costa made his professional MMA debut at 17 years old. In 2016, he moved to the city of Belém looking for better opportunities in the regional circuit. During this period, his hardships led him to be discovered by coach João Emilio, resulting in his relocation to Bauru, São Paulo, and his affiliation with the Chute Boxe Bauru team.

On August 18, 2018, Costa fought for the Demolidor Fight 13 lightweight championship against Rafael Barbosa. During the third round, Costa was caught in an arm-triangle choke and lost consciousness. The referee, Emerson Saez, failed to notice that Costa was out and let the fight continue for almost two minutes, while Costa even suffered seizures in the cage. His opponent realized the situation and loosened the grip on his own, which Costa later stated saved his life. He was hospitalized after regaining consciousness in the cage but was released the next day without severe injuries.

He compiled a record of 19 wins and 5 losses in the regional circuit fighting in the bantamweight, featherweight, and lightweight divisions. During this run, Costa won the Predator FC Featherweight Championship in Mexico. He also competed in the Legacy Fighting Alliance (LFA), where he secured his UFC spot after a third-round technical knockout win over Jose Cleiton de Melo Jr. at LFA 147 in November 2022.

=== Ultimate Fighting Championship ===
Costa made his UFC debut replacing Guram Kutateladze on short notice in a lightweight bout against Thiago Moisés at UFC 283 on January 21, 2023. He lost the fight in the second round via submission due to a face crank.

He made his promotional featherweight debut and returned to the division against Austin Lingo at UFC on ESPN 49 on July 15, 2023. He won the fight via unanimous decision.

Costa was scheduled to face Steve Garcia at UFC on ESPN 52 on December 2, 2023, but the bout was cancelled during fight week after Garcia fell ill. The matchup was rescheduled for the following week at UFC Fight Night 233 on December 9, 2023. He lost the fight in the second round via technical knockout after receiving repeated elbows.

Costa faced Shayilan Nuerdanbieke at UFC on ESPN 58 on June 15, 2024. He won the fight in the third round via submission due to a face crank.

Costa faced Andre Fili at UFC Fight Night 252 on February 22, 2025. He won the fight in the first round via submission with a guillotine choke.

Making a quick turnaround, Costa faced Christian Rodriguez at UFC on ESPN 64 on March 29, 2025. He won the fight via unanimous decision.

Costa faced Julian Erosa at UFC Fight Night 256 on May 17, 2025. He won the fight via unanimous decision. This win earned him his first Fight of the Night bonus award.

Costa faced Morgan Charrière at UFC on ESPN 73 on December 13, 2025. He won the fight via knockout in the first round with a head kick.

Costa faced Dan Ige at UFC Fight Night 267 on February 21, 2026. He won the fight in the first round via technical knockout with a spinning back kick and punches, marking the first time Ige was stopped in a mixed martial arts bout. This fight earned him his first Performance of the Night award.

Costa faced Arnold Allen, headlining his first event at UFC Fight Night 276 on May 16, 2026. He lost the fight by unanimous decision.

Moving to Lightweight, Costa faced Jared Gordon on November 14, 2026 at UFC 334. He won the fight by unanimous decision.

== Personal life ==
Costa has lived with vitiligo since his childhood. He uses his visibility in MMA to act as an advocate for awareness about the condition, supporting children who face discrimination. As a way to fight back against the bullying he suffered growing up, he adopted the nickname "The Dalmatian". In his fights, Costa often expresses his visual identity by dyeing his hair in different colors and painting his face in various ways, notably referencing the dog breed during the official weigh-ins at UFC Seattle.

Of Afro-Brazilian descent, Costa is married to his wife, Cintia Larissa, and has two children (a daughter and a son).

In early 2025, Costa revealed he suffered an anxiety crisis due to financial struggles and a delay in his contract renewal with the UFC. During this period, he even applied for a job as a driver for Uber to support his family, before finally signing the deal to face Andre Fili.

== Championships and accomplishments ==
- Ultimate Fighting Championship
  - Performance of the Night (One time) vs. Dan Ige
  - Fight of the Night (One time) vs. Julian Erosa
- Predator Fighting Championships
  - Predator FC Featherweight Championship (One time, former)
- MMA Mania
  - 2025 #5 Ranked Fight of the Year vs. Julian Erosa

== Mixed martial arts record ==
Professional record breakdown
35 matches	27 wins	8 losses
By knockout	9	2
By submission	8	2
By decision	10	4

Res.	Record	Opponent	Method	Event	Date	Round	Time	Location	Notes
Win	27–8	Jared Gordon	Decision (unanimous)	UFC 334	November 14, 2026	3	5:00	New York City, New York, United States	Return to Lightweight.
Loss	26–8	Arnold Allen	Decision (unanimous)	UFC Fight Night: Allen vs. Costa	May 16, 2026	5	5:00	Las Vegas, Nevada, United States	
Win	26–7	Dan Ige	TKO (spinning back kick and punches)	UFC Fight Night: Strickland vs. Hernandez	February 21, 2026	1	4:56	Houston, Texas, United States	Performance of the Night.
Win	25–7	Morgan Charrière	KO (head kick)	UFC on ESPN: Royval vs. Kape	December 13, 2025	1	1:14	Las Vegas, Nevada, United States	
Win	24–7	Julian Erosa	Decision (unanimous)	UFC Fight Night: Burns vs. Morales	May 17, 2025	3	5:00	Las Vegas, Nevada, United States	Fight of the Night.
Win	23–7	Christian Rodriguez	Decision (unanimous)	UFC on ESPN: Moreno vs. Erceg	March 29, 2025	3	5:00	Mexico City, Mexico	
Win	22–7	Andre Fili	Submission (guillotine choke)	UFC Fight Night: Cejudo vs. Song	February 22, 2025	1	4:30	Seattle, Washington, United States	
Win	21–7	Shayilan Nuerdanbieke	Submission (face crank)	UFC on ESPN: Perez vs. Taira	June 15, 2024	3	1:50	Las Vegas, Nevada, United States	
Loss	20–7	Steve Garcia	KO (elbows)	UFC Fight Night: Song vs. Gutiérrez	December 9, 2023	2	1:01	Las Vegas, Nevada, United States	Lightweight bout.
Win	20–6	Austin Lingo	Decision (unanimous)	UFC on ESPN: Holm vs. Bueno Silva	July 15, 2023	3	5:09	Las Vegas, Nevada, United States	Return to Featherweight.
Loss	19–6	Thiago Moisés	Submission (face crank)	UFC 283	January 21, 2023	2	4:05	Rio de Janeiro, Brazil	
Win	19–5	Junior Melo	TKO (punches)	LFA 147	November 18, 2022	3	2:00	Sloan, Iowa, United States	
Win	18–5	Tom Santos	TKO (punches)	Presas Combat 1	August 20, 2022	1	4:45	Marília, Brazil	
Loss	17–5	Italo Gomes	Decision (unanimous)	LFA 132	May 13, 2022	3	5:00	Rio de Janeiro, Brazil	Return to Lightweight.
Win	17–4	Ángel Rodriguez	Submission (rear-naked choke)	Predator FC 42	March 19, 2022	2	2:36	Cancún, Mexico	Won the vacant Predator FC Featherweight Championship.
Win	16–4	Leandro Santos	Decision (unanimous)	Future MMA 13	September 24, 2021	3	5:00	Saint Luzia, Brazil	
Win	15–4	Anderson Ferreira	TKO (punches)	Standout Fighting Tournament 21	February 29, 2020	1	2:13	São Paulo, Brazil	
Win	14–4	José Santana	Decision (unanimous)	Prainha Fight 6	June 28, 2019	3	5:00	Prainha, Brazil	Return to Lightweight.
Win	13–4	Marcelo Costa	Submission (rear-naked choke)	Animal Fight MMA 2019	May 18, 2019	1	1:00	Tomé-Açu, Brazil	
Loss	12–4	Marcos Vinicius	Decision (unanimous)	Thunder Fight 18	December 21, 2018	3	5:00	São Paulo, Brazil	Return to Featherweight.
Win	12–3	Alexandre Araújo	TKO (punches)	Jabuka Fight 7	November 23, 2018	2	1:03	Jaboticabal, Brazil	
Loss	11–3	Rafael Barbosa	Submission (arm-triangle choke)	Demolidor Fight 13	August 18, 2018	3	3:08	São Paulo, Brazil	For the vacant DFMMA Lightweight Championship.
Loss	11–2	Antônio Monteiro	Decision (unanimous)	Mr. Cage 32	December 30, 2017	3	5:00	Manaus, Brazil	Featherweight bout.
Win	11–1	Max Douglas	TKO (retirement)	Orixi Combat 1	September 30, 2017	3	5:00	Oriximiná, Brazil	Won the Oriximiná Combat Lightweight Championship.
Win	10–1	Willian Santos Silva	Submission (heel hook)	Porto Fight 10	July 28, 2017	1	1:22	Porto de Moz, Brazil	
Win	9–1	Jecônias Dias Sandes	Decision (unanimous)	Porto Fight 9	June 17, 2017	3	5:00	Almeririm, Brazil	Lightweight debut.
Loss	8–1	Elismar Lima	TKO (doctor stoppage)	Titans Fighters Champions 1	March 10, 2017	1	5:00	Goiânia, Brazil	
Win	8–0	João Ferreira Jr.	Submission (rear-naked choke)	Instituto Fazendo Campeões 1	December 17, 2016	1	3:37	Ananindeua, Brazil	
Win	7–0	Vitor Leandro	Submission (anaconda choke)	Marajó Open Fight 2	November 10, 2016	1	1:50	Soure, Brazil	Return to Featherweight.
Win	6–0	Severino Ramalho da Silva Jr.	Decision (unanimous)	Strike FC 3	March 11, 2016	3	5:00	Belém, Brazil	
Win	5–0	Jonas dos Santos	Decision (unanimous)	Relevation FC 3	January 29, 2016	3	5:00	Belém, Brazil	Bantamweight debut.
Win	4–0	Sergio Silva	KO (head kick)	Porto Fight 7	December 19, 2015	1	0:31	Porto de Moz, Brazil	
Win	3–0	Erwin Filho de Andrade Furtado	KO (head kick)	Porto Fight 6	May 9, 2015	1	3:42	Porto de Moz, Brazil	
Win	2–0	Adriel Santos	Submission (heel hook)	Xingu Fight 6	May 17, 2014	3	3:00	Porto de Moz, Brazil	
Win	1–0	Benjamin Junior Coelho Pantoja	Decision (split)	Winner Combat MMA: Gurupá vs. Porto de Moz	March 8, 2014	3	3:00	Gurupá, Brazil	Featherweight debut.

== See also ==
- List of current UFC fighters
- List of male mixed martial artists
