= Ailín Pérez =

Argentine mixed martial artist and model (born 1994)

- Born: Ailín Luciana Pérez; 5 October 1994 (age 32); Hurlingham, Buenos Aires, Argentina
- Nickname: Fiona
- Height: 5 ft 5 in (1.65 m)
- Weight: 135 lb (61 kg)
- Division: Bantamweight
- Reach: 66 in (168 cm)
- Fighting out of: Buenos Aires, Argentina
- Team: The Goat Shed
- Years active: 2018–present

Mixed martial arts record
- Total: 16
- Wins: 14
- By knockout: 4
- By submission: 2
- By decision: 8
- Losses: 2
- By submission: 1
- By disqualification: 1

Other information
- Mixed martial arts record from Sherdog

Ailín Luciana Pérez (born 5 October 1994) is an Argentinian professional mixed martial artist and OnlyFans model who competes in the women's Bantamweight division of the Ultimate Fighting Championship (UFC). As of 26 September 2026, she is #2 in the Meta UFC women's bantamweight rankings.

== Background ==
Pérez started in martial arts at the age of 11 in Zárate, with kung fu and sanda, and at the age of 20 she decided to move to Buenos Aires and do some Brazilian jiu-jitsu (BJJ), to get more into MMA. Finally, she turned professional in 2018.

== Mixed martial arts career ==
=== Early career ===
Pérez won the women's bantamweight title of the Brazilian company Samurai Fight House in August 2021 by defeating Alessandra Tainara with a head kick. But she lost it in November 2021 against Tamires Vidal, to whom she applied an illegal knee.

=== Ultimate Fighting Championship ===
Pérez debuted in the UFC on September 3, 2022. It was scheduled for her to face Zarah Fairn Dos Santos at UFC Fight Night 209. However, Fairn was withdrawn from the event for unknown reasons and replaced by Stephanie Egger. Pérez lost the fight by rear-naked choke submission in the second round.

Pérez faced Ashlee Evans-Smith on July 15, 2023, at UFC Fight Night 224. She won the fight by unanimous decision.

Pérez faced Lucie Pudilová on November 18, 2023, at UFC Fight Night 232. She won the fight by unanimous decision.

Despite a prior altercation, Pérez ended up facing Joselyne Edwards on June 1, 2024, at UFC 302. She won the fight once again by unanimous decision.

Pérez faced Darya Zheleznyakova on September 28, 2024 at UFC Fight Night 243. At the weigh-ins, Pérez weighed in at 136.5 pounds, half a pound over the bantamweight non-title fight limit. She appeared weak and trembling due to the effects of weight-cutting, despite still missing her target weight. Her appearance made headlines and added concern about the UFC's weight-cutting process. The bout proceeded at catchweight and Perez was fined 20 percent of her purse, which went to her opponent Zheleznyakova. Pérez won the fight via an arm-triangle choke submission in the first round.

Pérez faced Karol Rosa on January 18, 2025, at UFC 311. She won the fight by unanimous decision.

Pérez faced Macy Chiasson on February 28, 2026, at UFC Fight Night 268. She won the fight by unanimous decision.

Pérez faced Norma Dumont on September 26, 2026 at UFC Fight Night 289. She won the fight by unanimous decision, but not without security intervening after a confrontation ensued between both fighters right after the final round and then interfering once more when Pérez taunted Dumont after being announced the winner.

== Controversies ==
=== Altercation with Joselyne Edwards ===
Before UFC Fight Night 232, she appeared with stitches under her left eye following an altercation with her opponent, Joselyne Edwards of Panama. Ailín declined to comment on the matter, stating she would do so only after the fight with Edwards. According to Pérez, it was her coach who broke up the altercation, stating, "This was an assault I had in the PI. It was some random person who came to attack me so the fight wouldn't happen." From her part Edwards told MMAMania.com, "While we were fighting, her coach attacked me from behind. He was choking me so [Ailín] could hit me. I practically had to fight both of them. He didn't protect anyone, he started the fight."

=== Twerking celebration ===
On September 28, 2024, during the UFC Fight Night 243 event in Paris, Pérez was criticized for celebrating her victory against Darya Zheleznyakova by twerking in her opponent's face after submitting her in the first round. The action was deemed disrespectful by figures such as Ariel Helwani. Pérez, unapologetically, justified her behavior by claiming that Zhelezniakova had made offensive comments before the fight. The incident also had repercussions in France, where she was reportedly suspended for her actions, something the fighter mentioned on her social media by sharing a screenshot of an article confirming the sanction.

== Personal life ==
Pérez is a single mother and has an 8-year-old son.

== Championships and accomplishments ==
- Ultimate Fighting Championship
  - Tied (Jéssica Andrade) for most takedowns landed in a UFC Women's bout (10) (vs. Ashlee Evans-Smith)
    - Most takedowns landed in a UFC Women's Bantamweight bout (10) (vs. Ashlee Evans-Smith)
  - Second longest win streak in UFC Women's Bantamweight division history (7) (behind Amanda Nunes)
  - Second most takedowns landed in UFC Women's Bantamweight division history (29) (behind Amanda Nunes)
  - Second fewest strikes absorbed-per-minute in UFC Women's Bantamweight division history (1.82)
  - Third highest top-position percentage in UFC Women's Bantamweight division history (36.0%)
  - Fifth highest control time percentage in UFC Women's Bantamweight division history (44.5%)
  - Sixth highest significant strike accuracy in UFC Women's Bantamweight division history (54.7%)
- Samurai Fight House
  - Samurai Fight House Bantamweight Champion (Two time)

== Mixed martial arts record ==
Professional record breakdown
16 matches	14 wins	2 losses
By knockout	4	0
By submission	2	1
By decision	8	0
By disqualification	0	1

Res.	Record	Opponent	Method	Event	Date	Round	Time	Location	Notes
Win	14–2	Norma Dumont	Decision (unanimous)	UFC Fight Night: Rosas Jr. vs. Barcelos	26 September 2026	3	5:00	Las Vegas, Nevada, United States	
Win	13–2	Macy Chiasson	Decision (unanimous)	UFC Fight Night: Moreno vs. Kavanagh	28 February 2026	3	5:00	Mexico City, Mexico	
Win	12–2	Karol Rosa	Decision (unanimous)	UFC 311	18 January 2025	3	5:00	Inglewood, California, United States	
Win	11–2	Darya Zheleznyakova	Submission (arm-triangle choke)	UFC Fight Night: Moicano vs. Saint Denis	28 September 2024	1	3:52	Paris, France	Catchweight (136.5 lb) bout; Pérez missed weight.
Win	10–2	Joselyne Edwards	Decision (unanimous)	UFC 302	1 June 2024	3	5:00	Newark, New Jersey, United States	
Win	9–2	Lucie Pudilová	Decision (unanimous)	UFC Fight Night: Allen vs. Craig	18 November 2023	3	5:00	Las Vegas, Nevada, United States	
Win	8–2	Ashlee Evans-Smith	Decision (unanimous)	UFC on ESPN: Holm vs. Bueno Silva	15 July 2023	3	5:00	Las Vegas, Nevada, United States	Return to Bantamweight.
Loss	7–2	Stephanie Egger	Submission (rear-naked choke)	UFC Fight Night: Gane vs. Tuivasa	3 September 2022	2	4:54	Paris, France	Featherweight debut.
Win	7–1	Stephanie Bragayrac	TKO (corner stoppage)	Samurai Fight House 4	22 May 2022	2	5:00	Buenos Aires, Argentina	Won the SFH Women's Bantamweight Championship.
Win	6–1	Romina Aguirre	TKO (punches)	Samurai Fight House 3	12 February 2022	1	3:51	Buenos Aires, Argentina	
Loss	5–1	Tamires Vidal	DQ (illegal knees)	Samurai Fight House 2	6 November 2021	3	3:00	Rio de Janeiro, Brazil	Lost the SFH Women's Bantamweight Championship.
Win	5–0	Alessandra Tainara	KO (head kick)	Samurai Fight House 1	21 August 2021	1	4:20	Feira de Santana, Brazil	Won the inaugural SFH Women's Bantamweight Championship.
Win	4–0	Geyse Yasmin	Decision (unanimous)	Natal FC 19	4 June 2021	3	5:00	Natal, Brazil	
Win	3–0	Fiorella Cardozo	TKO (retirement)	Collision Fight Ultimate 12	19 June 2019	1	1:02	Montevideo, Uruguay	Defended the CFU Women's Bantamweight Championship.
Win	2–0	Laura Ribeiro	Submission (rear-naked choke)	Collision Fight Ultimate 10	7 December 2018	2	1:45	Montevideo, Uruguay	Bantamweight debut. Won the vacant CFU Women's Bantamweight Championship.
Win	1–0	Noemi Galarza	Decision (unanimous)	ULLAMP: Liga Sudamericana 2	24 November 2018	3	5:00	Buenos Aires, Argentina	Flyweight debut.
