= Chris Luttrell =

Chris Luttrell is a co-owner and mixed martial arts coach of Luttrell-Yee MMA. He is also an officer in the Albuquerque Police Department Gang Unit and has trained a number of notable mixed martial artists, such as Cláudia Gadelha, John Dodson, Georges St. Pierre, Carlos Condit and Rashad Evans. He has won a number of martial arts awards.

== Career ==
=== Criminal justice ===
He served in the Bernalillo County Sheriff's department as a reserve deputy from 1995 to 2000 and then accepted a position with the New Mexico State Police. In 2007, he moved over to the Albuquerque Police Department, and is now a member of their Gang Unit.

=== Martial arts ===
Luttrell was the principal figure in developing Greg Jackson's system of martial arts which is known as Gaidojutsu system, (loosely translated at "technique of the streets"). Luttrell introduced Mike Winkeljohn to Jackson and eventually talked Jackson into converting his self defense gym into an MMA gym. They then needed to develop a system that they thought had the most effective, fight-proven techniques. Luttrell did this by traveling the country as a flight attendant, finding every fight gym or serious martial arts dojo and requesting to train for a night. Luttrell trained with everyone, from Royce Gracie and Pat Militech to Megaton Diaz, with whom he had epic roll at his academy. City by city, as his travels took him, he trained, learned, and recorded, Luttrell would return to his hotel and take notes in a journal on every technique he'd learned at each academy and bring it back to Albuquerque. These techniques would then be tested in the gym, in the bars, streets, and wherever was necessary to verify the legitimacy of the technique and what didn't work was discarded. When cage matches or Vale Tudo matches first began happening in the southwest, Luttrell was the first to compete. Along with Jackson and Winklejohn, the three organized a belt system for Gaidojutsu, and in 2000, Luttrell was the first to obtain a black belt in the art. The original team was made up of Chris Luttrell, Brad Ahrensfeld, Tom Vaughn, Josh Groves, Chad Lemoine, Keith Jardine, Diego Sanchez, and Kyle Seals.

He was approached in 2011 by Keith Jardine to help establish a school to teach mixed martial arts as both a form of fitness training and self-defense. Two years later, Luttrell took over as owner and head coach and renamed the gym Luttrell's MMA, and in 2015, he partnered with long-time acquaintance and colleague Ray Yee, to form Luttrell-Yee MMA.

=== Awards ===
Some of Luttrell's accomplishments include:

- Texas Vale Tudo Champion 1995
- Arizona Grappling Champion 1994
- Grablefest Champion 1997
- 3X New Mexico State wrestling champion
- 1st Black belt in Gaidojutsu
- National Freestyle Champion, represented Team USA in 1980 Schoolboy World Championships at 112 lbs.
