= UFC Fight Night: Smith vs. Spann =

2021 MMA event

- The poster for UFC Fight Night: Smith vs. Spann
- Promotion: Ultimate Fighting Championship
- Date: September 18, 2021
- Venue: UFC Apex
- City: Enterprise, Nevada, United States
- Attendance: Not announced

Event chronology
UFC Fight Night: Brunson vs. Till	UFC Fight Night: Smith vs. Spann	UFC 266: Volkanovski vs. Ortega

UFC Fight Night: Smith vs. Spann (also known as UFC Fight Night 192, UFC Vegas 37 and UFC on ESPN+ 50) was a mixed martial arts event produced by the Ultimate Fighting Championship that took place on September 18, 2021, at the UFC Apex facility in Enterprise, Nevada, part of the Las Vegas Metropolitan Area, United States.

== Background ==
A light heavyweight bout between former UFC Light Heavyweight Championship title challenger Anthony Smith and Ryan Spann served as the main event.

A light heavyweight bout between Ion Cuțelaba and Devin Clark was rescheduled to take place at this event. The bout was previously scheduled to take place in May at UFC on ESPN: Reyes vs. Procházka, but Clark pulled out of that event citing injury.

A bantamweight bout between Tony Gravely and Nate Maness took place at this event. The pairing was previously scheduled to meet at UFC on ESPN: Whittaker vs. Gastelum, but it was scrapped after Maness was removed from the bout for undisclosed reasons.

A bantamweight bout between Montel Jackson and Danaa Batgerel was scheduled for the event. However, Batgerel was pulled from the event due to visa issues and replaced by JP Buys.

Cory McKenna was expected to face Emily Whitmire in a women's strawweight bout at this event. However, McKenna was removed from the event for an undisclosed reason and replaced by Hannah Goldy.

A women's flyweight bout between former KSW Women's Flyweight Champion Ariane Lipski and promotional newcomer Mandy Böhm took place at the event. The pairing was previously scheduled to take place two weeks earlier at UFC Fight Night: Brunson vs. Till, but it was removed from the card during the week leading up to that event as Böhm was sidelined due to illness.

A lightweight bout between Jim Miller and Nikolas Motta was expected to take place at the event. However, Miller tested positive for COVID-19 a week before the event and was pulled from the contest. He was replaced by promotional newcomer Cameron VanCamp. In turn, the bout was scrapped in the days leading up to the event due to an undisclosed injury to one of the participants.

A lightweight bout between Dakota Bush and Rong Zhu was expected to take place at the event. However, Bush tested positive for COVID-19 during fight week and was replaced by Brandon Jenkins. At the weigh-ins, Zhu weighed in at 158 pounds, two pounds over the lightweight non-title fight limit. The bout proceeded at a catchweight and he forfeited 20% of his purse to his opponent.

== Results ==
Main Card (ESPN+)
Weight class				Method	Round	Time	Notes
Light Heavyweight	Anthony Smith	def.	Ryan Spann	Submission (rear-naked choke)	1	3:47
Light Heavyweight	Ion Cuțelaba	def.	Devin Clark	Decision (unanimous) (30–26, 29–26, 29–27)	3	5:00
Women's Flyweight	Ariane Lipski	def.	Mandy Böhm	Decision (unanimous) (30–27, 30–27, 30–27)	3	5:00
Lightweight	Arman Tsarukyan	def.	Christos Giagos	TKO (punches)	1	2:09
Bantamweight	Nate Maness	def.	Tony Gravely	TKO (punches)	2	2:10
Middleweight	Joaquin Buckley	def.	Antônio Arroyo	KO (punches)	3	2:26
Preliminary card (ESPN+)
Light Heavyweight	Tafon Nchukwi	def.	Mike Rodríguez	Decision (unanimous) (30–27, 30–27, 30–27)	3	5:00
Women's Bantamweight	Raquel Pennington	def.	Pannie Kianzad	Decision (unanimous) (29–28, 29–28, 29–28)	3	5:00
Catchweight (158 lb)	Rong Zhu	def.	Brandon Jenkins	TKO (punches)	3	4:35
Bantamweight	Montel Jackson	def.	JP Buys	Decision (unanimous) (30–27, 30–27, 30–27)	3	5:00
Women's Flyweight	Erin Blanchfield	def.	Sarah Alpar	Decision (unanimous) (30–25, 30–25, 30–26)	3	5:00
Welterweight	Carlston Harris	def.	Impa Kasanganay	TKO (punches)	1	2:38
Bantamweight	Gustavo Lopez	vs.	Alateng Heili	Draw (unanimous) (28–28, 28–28, 28–28)	3	5:00	(Note: Alateng was deducted one point in round 3 due to repeatedly grabbing the cage.)
Women's Flyweight	Hannah Goldy	def.	Emily Whitmire	Submission (armbar)	1	4:17

== Bonus awards ==
The following fighters received $50,000 bonuses.

- Fight of the Night: No bonus awarded.
- Performance of the Night: Anthony Smith, Arman Tsarukyan, Nate Maness and Joaquin Buckley

== See also ==
- List of UFC events
- List of current UFC fighters
- 2021 in UFC
