= UFC Fight Night: Edgar vs. The Korean Zombie =

UFC mixed martial arts event in 2019

- The poster for UFC Fight Night: Edgar vs. The Korean Zombie
- Promotion: Ultimate Fighting Championship
- Date: December 21, 2019
- Venue: Sajik Arena
- City: Busan, South Korea
- Attendance: 10,651

Event chronology
UFC 245: Usman vs. Covington	UFC Fight Night: Edgar vs. The Korean Zombie	UFC 246: McGregor vs. Cowboy

UFC Fight Night: Edgar vs. The Korean Zombie (also known as UFC Fight Night 165 and UFC on ESPN+ 23) was a mixed martial arts event produced by the Ultimate Fighting Championship that took place on December 21, 2019 at Sajik Arena in Busan, South Korea.

== Background ==
The event marked the promotion's first visit to Busan and the second in South Korea, after UFC Fight Night: Henderson vs. Masvidal in November 2015.

A featherweight bout between former UFC Featherweight Championship challengers Brian Ortega and Chan Sung Jung was originally slated as the event headliner. However, Ortega pulled out of the fight in early December, citing a knee injury. He was replaced by former UFC Lightweight Champion Frankie Edgar. The two were previously scheduled to meet on November 10, 2018 at UFC Fight Night: The Korean Zombie vs. Rodríguez. However, Edgar was forced to pull out of that bout after tearing his bicep.

A flyweight bout between Ji Yeon Kim and Sabina Mazo was scheduled for the event. However, it was reported on November 1 that Kim was forced to pull out of the fight due to an undisclosed injury.

A flyweight bout between Veronica Macedo and Amanda Lemos was scheduled for the event. However, Macedo was removed from the event in favor of a matchup with Ariane Lipski on November 16 at UFC Fight Night: Błachowicz vs. Jacaré. Lemos instead fought Miranda Granger.

== Results ==
Main Card (ESPN+)
Weight class				Method	Round	Time	Notes
Featherweight	Chan Sung Jung	def.	Frankie Edgar	TKO (punches)	1	3:18
Light Heavyweight	Volkan Oezdemir	def.	Aleksandar Rakić	Decision (split) (29–28, 28–29, 29–28)	3	5:00
Featherweight	Charles Jourdain	def.	Choi Doo-ho	TKO (punches)	2	4:32
Light Heavyweight	Da Un Jung	def.	Mike Rodríguez	KO (punches)	1	1:04
Middleweight	Jun Yong Park	def.	Marc-André Barriault	Decision (unanimous) (30–27, 29–28, 29–28)	3	5:00
Bantamweight	Kang Kyung-ho	def.	Liu Pingyuan	Decision (split) (28–29, 29–28, 30–27)	3	5:00
Preliminary Card (ESPN)
Heavyweight	Ciryl Gane	def.	Tanner Boser	Decision (unanimous) (30–26, 30–26, 30–26)	3	5:00
Featherweight	Seung Woo Choi	def.	Suman Mokhtarian	Decision (unanimous) (29–26, 29–26, 29–25)	3	5:00	(Note: Choi was deducted a point in round 1 due to repeatedly grabbing the fence.)
Lightweight	Omar Morales	def.	Dong Hyun Ma	Decision (unanimous) (30–27, 30–26, 29–28)	3	5:00
Flyweight	Alexandre Pantoja	def.	Matt Schnell	KO (punches)	1	4:17
Bantamweight	Raoni Barcelos	def.	Said Nurmagomedov	Decision (unanimous) (30–27, 29–28, 29–28)	3	5:00
Women's Strawweight	Amanda Lemos	def.	Miranda Granger	Technical Submission (rear-naked choke)	1	3:43
Bantamweight	Alateng Heili	def.	Ryan Benoit	Decision (split) (28–29, 29–28, 29–28)	3	5:00

== Bonus awards ==
The following fighters received $50,000 bonuses.

- Fight of the Night: Charles Jourdain vs. Doo Ho Choi
- Performance of the Night: Chan Sung Jung and Alexandre Pantoja

== See also ==
- List of UFC events
- 2019 in UFC
- List of current UFC fighters
