= Seung Woo Choi =

South Korean mixed martial arts fighter

- Born: November 3, 1992 (age 33); Kangnung, South Korea
- Other names: Sting
- Height: 5 ft 11 in (1.80 m)
- Weight: 146 lb (66 kg; 10 st 6 lb)
- Division: Featherweight
- Reach: 74.5 in (189 cm)
- Style: Muay Thai
- Fighting out of: Seoul, South Korea
- Team: Mob Training Center
- Years active: 2015–present

Mixed martial arts record
- Total: 19
- Wins: 11
- By knockout: 6
- By decision: 5
- Losses: 8
- By knockout: 4
- By submission: 2
- By decision: 2

Other information
- University: Yong In University
- Mixed martial arts record from Sherdog

Choi Seung-woo (Korean: 최승우; born November 3, 1992), often anglicized Seung Woo Choi, is a South Korean mixed martial artist who competed in the featherweight division of the Ultimate Fighting Championship (UFC). Choi was the former Top Fighting Championship Featherweight Champion (two times) and a 2010 Bronze medalist at the IFMA World Muaythai Championships.

== Background ==
Choi began practicing martial arts at the age of eight, eventually representing South Korea in the Muay Thai World Championships. He graduated from Yong In University with a bachelor's degree.

== Mixed martial arts career ==
=== Early career ===
Choi started his professional MMA career in 2015 and fought under various promoters primarily in Asia. He was the former featherweight Top Fighting Championship champion (x2) and he was signed by the UFC after he won the Top FC featherweight championship for a second time with an amassed record of 7–1.

=== Ultimate Fighting Championship ===
Choi made his promotional debut on April 20, 2019, at UFC Fight Night: Overeem vs. Oleinik as a short-notice replacement against Movsar Evloev. He lost the fight via unanimous decision.

Choi faced Gavin Tucker on July 27, 2019, at UFC 240. He lost the fight via submission in the third round.

Choi next faced Suman Mokhtarian on December 21, 2019, at UFC Fight Night: Edgar vs. The Korean Zombie. He won the fight via unanimous decision.

Choi was expected to face Youssef Zalal on October 11, 2020, at UFC Fight Night 179, but was pulled from the bout due to an undisclosed reason and was replaced by Ilia Topuria.

Choi was scheduled to meet Steven Peterson on February 6, 2021, at UFC Fight Night 184. In turn, Peterson pulled out on January 15 due to an injury and was replaced by promotional newcomer Collin Anglin. Anglin was pulled from the event for an undisclosed reason, and Youssef Zalal replaced him. He won the fight via unanimous decision.

Choi faced Julian Erosa on June 19, 2021, at UFC on ESPN 25. He won the fight via knockout in the first round. This fight earned him the Performance of the Night award.

Choi faced Alex Caceres on October 23, 2021, at UFC Fight Night 196. He lost the fight via rear-naked choke submission in round two.

Choi is scheduled to face Tucker Lutz on March 26, 2022, at UFC Fight Night 205. However, Choi was forced to withdraw from the event due to an undisclosed injury.

Choi faced Joshua Culibao on June 11, 2022, at UFC 275. He lost the bout via split decision.

Choi faced Michael Trizano on November 12, 2022, at UFC 281. Trizano weighed 147.6 pounds at the weigh-ins, one and six-tenths of a pound over the featherweight non-title fight limit. The bout proceeded at a catchweight with Trizano fined 20% of his purse, which went to Choi. He lost the fight via knockout in the first round.

Choi faced Jarno Errens on August 26, 2023, at UFC Fight Night 225. He won the bout via unanimous decision.

Choi was scheduled to face Morgan Charrière on April 6, 2024, at UFC Fight Night 240. However, Choi withdrew from the fight for unknown reasons and was replaced by Jose Mariscal.

Choi faced Steve Garcia on July 20, 2024, at UFC on ESPN 60. He lost the fight by technical knockout in the first round.

Choi faced promotional newcomer Kevin Vallejos on March 15, 2025, at UFC Fight Night 254. He lost the fight by technical knockout in the first round.

On April 9, 2025, it was reported that Choi was removed from the UFC roster.

== Personal life ==
Choi lost his mother in early 2025.

== Championships and accomplishments ==
=== Mixed martial arts ===
- Ultimate Fighting Championship
  - Performance of the Night (One time) vs. Julian Erosa
- Top Fighting Championship
  - Top Fighting Championship Featherweight Champion (Two times) vs. Min Gu Lee and Jae Woong Kim

=== Muay Thai ===
- South Korea Muay Thai national team fighter
- Muay Thai World Championships
  - 2010 Bronze medal at Muay Thai World Championships

== Mixed martial arts record ==
Professional record breakdown
19 matches	11 wins	8 losses
By knockout	6	4
By submission	0	2
By decision	5	2

Res.	Record	Opponent	Method	Event	Date	Round	Time	Location	Notes
Loss	11–8	Kevin Vallejos	TKO (punches)	UFC Fight Night: Vettori vs. Dolidze 2	March 15, 2025	1	3:09	Las Vegas, Nevada, United States	
Loss	11–7	Steve Garcia	TKO (punches)	UFC on ESPN: Lemos vs. Jandiroba	July 20, 2024	1	1:36	Las Vegas, Nevada, United States	
Win	11–6	Jarno Errens	Decision (unanimous)	UFC Fight Night: Holloway vs. The Korean Zombie	August 26, 2023	3	5:00	Kallang, Singapore	
Loss	10–6	Michael Trizano	KO (punches)	UFC 281	November 12, 2022	1	4:51	New York City, New York, United States	Catchweight (147.6 lb) bout; Trizano missed weight.
Loss	10–5	Joshua Culibao	Decision (split)	UFC 275	June 11, 2022	3	5:00	Kallang, Singapore	
Loss	10–4	Alex Caceres	Submission (rear-naked choke)	UFC Fight Night: Costa vs. Vettori	October 23, 2021	2	3:31	Las Vegas, Nevada, United States	Choi was deducted one point in round 1 due to an illegal knee.
Win	10–3	Julian Erosa	TKO (punches)	UFC on ESPN: The Korean Zombie vs. Ige	June 19, 2021	1	1:37	Las Vegas, Nevada, United States	Performance of the Night.
Win	9–3	Youssef Zalal	Decision (unanimous)	UFC Fight Night: Overeem vs. Volkov	February 6, 2021	3	5:00	Las Vegas, Nevada, United States	
Win	8–3	Suman Mokhtarian	Decision (unanimous)	UFC Fight Night: Edgar vs. The Korean Zombie	December 21, 2019	3	5:00	Busan, South Korea	Choi was deducted a point in round 1 due to repeatedly grabbing the fence.
Loss	7–3	Gavin Tucker	Submission (rear-naked choke)	UFC 240	July 27, 2019	3	3:17	Edmonton, Alberta, Canada	Tucker was deducted one point in round 2 due to an illegal knee.
Loss	7–2	Movsar Evloev	Decision (unanimous)	UFC Fight Night: Overeem vs. Oleinik	April 20, 2019	3	5:00	Saint Petersburg, Russia	Evloev was deducted one point in round 2 due to an illegal knee.
Win	7–1	Kim Jae-woong	KO (punch)	Top FC 16	December 9, 2017	2	2:47	Seoul, South Korea	Won the Top FC Featherweight Championship.
Win	6–1	Kil Young-bok	TKO (punches)	Top FC 15	July 22, 2017	1	1:33	Seoul, South Korea	
Loss	5–1	Kim Jae-woong	TKO (punches)	Top FC 14	March 6, 2017	1	0:36	Seoul, South Korea	Lost the Top FC Featherweight Championship.
Win	5–0	Lee Min-gu	KO (punch)	Top FC 12	September 11, 2016	4	2:38	Seoul, South Korea	Won the Top FC Featherweight Championship.
Win	4–0	Rocky Lee	Decision (unanimous)	Art of War 17	April 30, 2016	2	5:00	Beijing, China	Bantamweight debut.
Win	3–0	Oh Tae-seok	KO (knee)	Top FC 10	March 19, 2016	1	1:55	Seoul, South Korea	Catchweight (154 lb) bout.
Win	2–0	Nurzhan Tutkaev	Decision (unanimous)	Kunlun Fight: Cage Fight Series 4	November 4, 2015	3	5:00	Astana, Kazakhstan	Catchweight (150 lb) bout.
Win	1–0	Yoon Tae-seung	TKO (cut)	Top FC 8	August 15, 2015	1	1:45	Seoul, South Korea	Featherweight debut.

== See also ==
- List of male mixed martial artists
