= Hannah Goldy =

American mixed martial arts fighter

- Born: May 18, 1992 (age 34); Bondville, Vermont, United States
- Other names: 24k
- Height: 5 ft 4 in (1.63 m)
- Weight: 125 lb (57 kg; 8 st 13 lb)
- Division: Strawweight; Flyweight
- Reach: 61 in (155 cm)
- Stance: Orthodox
- Fighting out of: Orlando, Florida
- Team: Fusion X-Cel
- Years active: 2016–present

Mixed martial arts record
- Total: 11
- Wins: 7
- By knockout: 1
- By submission: 2
- By decision: 4
- Losses: 4
- By knockout: 1
- By decision: 3

Other information
- Mixed martial arts record from Sherdog

Hannah Goldy (born May 18, 1992), is an American mixed martial artist who competes in the Flyweight division. A professional since 2016, she is most notable for her time in the Ultimate Fighting Championship.

== Background ==
Goldy grew up in Vermont snowboarding, running track, and competing in cross-country. In 2014, while living in Manhattan she went with her father to a boxing event called "Friday Night Fights", held in an old church. She immediately fell in love with martial arts and went to a gym the next day. Before MMA, she had a boxing match and three Muay Thai fights, winning all four.

== Mixed martial arts career ==
=== Early career ===
She made her professional debut against future UFC fighter Gillian Robertson at Island Fights 37 on March 11, 2016, winning the bout via unanimous decision. She would then go on to win her bout against Vanessa Marie Grimes via TKO in the second round at Island Fights 46. At Premier FC 26 she faced Lisa Blaine, defeating her via unanimous decision, followed by a bout against Shannon Goughary at Island Fights 50, which she won in similar fashion.

Goldy was invited onto Dana White's Contender Series 17 on June 18, 2019, where she faced Kali Robbins. She won the bout via unanimous decision, but wasn't offered a UFC contract.

=== Ultimate Fighting Championship ===
Goldy made her UFC debut at flyweight against Miranda Granger on August 3, 2019 at UFC on ESPN: Covington vs. Lawler. She lost the fight via unanimous decision.

Goldy was scheduled to face Loma Lookboonmee on February 23, 2020 at UFC Fight Night 168. However, Goldy pulled out due to a shoulder injury.

Goldy was scheduled to face Jessica Penne to take place on March 27, 2021 at UFC 260. However, Goldy pulled out of the fight on March 24, due to testing positive for COVID-19, and the bout was scrapped. The pairing was rescheduled to UFC on ESPN 22 on April 17, 2021. A week before the bout, Goldy pulled out of the event, and she was replaced by LFA Women's Strawweight champion Lupita Godinez.

Goldy faced Diana Belbiţă at UFC on ESPN: Sandhagen vs. Dillashaw on July 24, 2021. She lost the fight via unanimous decision.

Goldy, as a replacement for Cory McKenna, faced Emily Whitmire at UFC Fight Night: Smith vs. Spann on September 18, 2021. She won the fight via an armbar in round one.

Goldy was scheduled to face Jinh Yu Frey on February 26, 2022 at UFC Fight Night 202. On February 23, Goldy withdrew from the bout due to illness and the bout was cancelled.

Goldy faced Molly McCann on July 23, 2022, at UFC Fight Night 208. She lost the bout via TKO in the first round.

Goldy faced Mizuki Inoue on September 23, 2023, at UFC Fight Night 228 She lost the fight via unanimous decision.

On October 11, 2023 it was announced that Goldy was no longer on the UFC roster.

=== Post UFC ===
Goldy faced Tayde Garcia at XFC 50 on April 12, 2024 and won the bout by an armbar submission at the end of the second round.

== Professional grappling career ==
Goldy competed in a superfight at Medusa 4 on March 25, 2023, where she was submitted by Madelynne Wade in EBI overtime.

Goldy competed against Amanda Mazza at UFC Fight Pass Invitational 5 on December 10, 2023. She won the match by submission with an armbar.

== Personal life ==
Goldy has a son with fellow mixed martial artist Alex Nicholson.

== Mixed martial arts record ==
Professional record breakdown
11 matches	7 wins	4 losses
By knockout	1	1
By submission	2	0
By decision	4	3

Res.	Record	Opponent	Method	Event	Date	Round	Time	Location	Notes
Win	7–4	Tayde Garcia	Submission (armbar)	XFC 50	April 12, 2024	2	4:58	Lakeland, Florida, United States	
Loss	6–4	Mizuki Inoue	Decision (unanimous)	UFC Fight Night: Fiziev vs. Gamrot	September 23, 2023	3	5:00	Las Vegas, Nevada, United States	Return to Strawweight.
Loss	6–3	Molly McCann	TKO (spinning back elbow and punches)	UFC Fight Night: Blaydes vs. Aspinall	July 23, 2022	1	3:52	London, England	
Win	6–2	Emily Whitmire	Submission (armbar)	UFC Fight Night: Smith vs. Spann	September 18, 2021	1	4:17	Las Vegas, Nevada, United States	Return to Flyweight.
Loss	5–2	Diana Belbiţă	Decision (unanimous)	UFC on ESPN: Sandhagen vs. Dillashaw	July 24, 2021	3	5:00	Las Vegas, Nevada, United States	
Loss	5–1	Miranda Granger	Decision (unanimous)	UFC on ESPN: Covington vs. Lawler	August 3, 2019	3	5:00	Newark, New Jersey, United States	Flyweight bout.
Win	5–0	Kali Robbins	Decision (unanimous)	Dana White's Contender Series 17	June 18, 2019	3	5:00	Las Vegas, Nevada, United States	Return to Strawweight.
Win	4–0	Shannon Goughary	Decision (unanimous)	Island Fights 50	September 29, 2018	3	5:00	Pensacola, Florida, United States	
Win	3–0	Lisa Blaine	Decision (unanimous)	Premier FC 26	June 16, 2018	3	5:00	Springfield, Massachusetts, United States	
Win	2–0	Vanessa Marie Grimes	TKO (punches)	Island Fights 46	February 8, 2018	2	2:39	Pensacola, Florida, United States	Flyweight debut.
Win	1–0	Gillian Robertson	Decision (unanimous)	Island Fights 37	March 11, 2016	3	5:00	Pensacola, Florida, United States	Strawweight debut.

== See also ==
- List of female mixed martial artists
