= UFC 281 =

Mixed martial arts event in 2022

UFC 281: Adesanya vs. Pereira
- The poster for UFC 281: Adesanya vs. Pereira
- Promotion: Ultimate Fighting Championship
- Date: November 12, 2022
- Venue: Madison Square Garden
- City: New York City, New York, United States
- Attendance: 20,845
- Total gate: $11,562,807.77

Event chronology
UFC Fight Night: Rodriguez vs. Lemos	UFC 281: Adesanya vs. Pereira	UFC Fight Night: Nzechukwu vs. Cuțelaba

UFC 281: Adesanya vs. Pereira was a mixed martial arts event produced by the Ultimate Fighting Championship that took place on November 12, 2022, at the Madison Square Garden in New York City, New York, United States.

== Background ==
A UFC Middleweight Championship bout between current champion Israel Adesanya and former Glory Middleweight and Light Heavyweight Champion Alex Pereira headlined the event. The pairing previously met twice in kickboxing matchups. The first in April 2016 which Pereira won by unanimous decision. Their second meeting took place at Glory of Heroes 7 in March 2017, which Pereira won by third-round knockout.

A UFC Women's Strawweight Championship bout between current two-time champion Carla Esparza and former champion Zhang Weili took place at the event.

A lightweight bout between Matt Frevola and returning veteran Ottman Azaitar was rescheduled for this event. The pairing was previously scheduled to meet in January 2021 at UFC 257, but Azaitar was pulled from the bout and had his contract briefly terminated after it was determined that he had violated COVID-19 health and safety protocols, as he attempted to help others enter the UFC's designated safety zone during fight week.

At the weigh-ins, Ryan Spann and The Ultimate Fighter: Undefeated lightweight winner Michael Trizano missed weight. Spann weighed in at 206.6 pounds, six tenths of a pound over the light heavyweight non-title fight limit. Trizano weighed in at 147.6 pounds, one and six tenths of a pound over the featherweight non-title fight limit. Both bouts proceeded at catchweight with each being fined 20% of their individual purses, which went to their opponents former UFC Light Heavyweight Championship challenger Dominick Reyes and Seung Woo Choi respectively.

== Results ==
Main card
Weight class				Method	Round	Time	Notes
Middleweight	Alex Pereira	def.	Israel Adesanya (c)	TKO (punches)	5	2:01	(Note: For the UFC Middleweight Championship.)
Women's Strawweight	Zhang Weili	def.	Carla Esparza (c)	Submission (rear-naked choke)	2	1:05	(Note: For the UFC Women's Strawweight Championship.)
Lightweight	Dustin Poirier	def.	Michael Chandler	Submission (rear-naked choke)	3	2:00
Bantamweight	Chris Gutiérrez	def.	Frankie Edgar	KO (knee)	1	2:01
Lightweight	Dan Hooker	def.	Claudio Puelles	TKO (body kick)	2	4:06
Preliminary card (ESPNews / ESPN+)
Lightweight	Renato Moicano	def.	Brad Riddell	Submission (rear-naked choke)	1	3:20
Catchweight (206.6 lb)	Ryan Spann	def.	Dominick Reyes	KO (punches)	1	1:20
Women's Flyweight	Erin Blanchfield	def.	Molly McCann	Submission (kimura)	1	3:37
Middleweight	Andre Petroski	def.	Wellington Turman	Decision (unanimous) (30–27, 30–27, 29–28)	3	5:00
Early preliminary card (ESPN+ / UFC Fight Pass)
Lightweight	Matt Frevola	def.	Ottman Azaitar	KO (punch)	1	2:30
Women's Strawweight	Karolina Kowalkiewicz	def.	Silvana Gómez Juárez	Decision (unanimous) (29–28, 29–28, 29–28)	3	5:00
Catchweight (147.6 lb)	Michael Trizano	def.	Seung Woo Choi	KO (punches)	1	4:51
Bantamweight	Montel Jackson	def.	Julio Arce	Decision (unanimous) (30–27, 30–27, 29–28)	3	5:00
Light Heavyweight	Carlos Ulberg	def.	Nicolae Negumereanu	KO (punches)	1	3:44

== Bonus awards ==
The following fighters received $50,000 bonuses.

- Fight of the Night: Dustin Poirier vs. Michael Chandler
- Performance of the Night: Alex Pereira and Zhang Weili

== Aftermath ==
With eleven finishes, the event tied UFC Fight Night: Rockhold vs. Bisping, UFC 224, UFC Fight Night: Imavov vs. Borralho, and UFC 329 for most finishes in a single UFC event. The record was ultimately surpassed in August 2026 when UFC Fight Night: Medić vs. Rodriguez recorded twelve finishes.

This event was also given the 2022 UFC Honors Event of the Year award as voted by the fans.

== See also ==
- List of UFC events
- List of current UFC fighters
- 2022 in UFC
