= Miranda Granger =

American mixed martial arts fighter (born 1992)

- Born: April 13, 1992 (age 34); Everett, Washington, U.S.
- Other names: Danger
- Height: 5 ft 7 in (170 cm)
- Weight: 116 lb (53 kg; 8 st 4 lb)
- Division: Strawweight
- Reach: 68 in (173 cm)
- Stance: Orthodox
- Fighting out of: Washington State
- Team: Charlie's Combat Club (2013–present)
- Rank: Black belt in Taekwondo
- Years active: 2017–present

Mixed martial arts record
- Total: 10
- Wins: 7
- By knockout: 1
- By submission: 5
- By decision: 1
- Losses: 3
- By submission: 2
- By decision: 1

Other information
- University: Bellevue College
- Mixed martial arts record from Sherdog

Miranda Granger (born April 13, 1992) is an American mixed martial artist who competes in the strawweight division. A professional since 2017, she most notably competed in the Ultimate Fighting Championship.

== Background ==
The daughter of Gordy and Cheryl Granger, Miranda was born and raised in Everett, Washington. She attended Snohomish High School for two years before transferring to Glacier Peak High School from where she graduated in 2010. Besides training taekwondo, she lettered overall ten times in soccer, basketball and softball. After the high school, Miranda continued playing softball and basketball while attending Everett Community College for a year before transferring to Bellevue College where she focused in softball.

After the college she returned to martial arts and begun to train kickboxing before picking up other disciplines of mixed martial arts.

== Mixed martial arts career ==
=== Early career ===
Granger made her professional debut on August 25, 2017, and amassed a 3-0 record before she was scheduled to face Amy Montenegro for the vacant DFC Strawweight Championship. She won the fight by a first-round submission.

Granger was subsequently scheduled to face Jamie Colleen at CFFC 71 on December 14, 2018, in her Cage Fury Fighting Championships debut. She won the fight by a first-round submission. Granger was then scheduled to face Heloisa Azevedo for the inaugural Cage Fury FC Strawweight Championship on May 25, 2019. She won the fight by a first-round submission, extending her finishing streak to six consecutive fights.

On September 3, 2019, it was announced that Granger had signed with the UFC.

=== Ultimate Fighting Championship ===
Granger made her UFC debut at flyweight against Hannah Goldy on August 3, 2019 at UFC on ESPN: Covington vs. Lawler. She won the fight via unanimous decision.

Granger made her return to strawweight on December 21, 2019 at UFC on ESPN+ 23 as an injury replacement for Veronica Macedo against Amanda Lemos. She lost the fight via technical submission.

Granger faced Ashley Yoder on November 14, 2020 at UFC Fight Night: Felder vs. dos Anjos. She lost the fight via unanimous decision.

Granger faced Cory McKenna on August 6, 2022 at UFC on ESPN 40. she lost the fight via a shoulder choke in round two.

After her loss, it was announced that Granger was no longer on the UFC roster.

== Personal life ==
Granger has been married to a fellow mixed martial artist Kaden Barish since 2016.

== Championships and achievements ==
- Dominate Fighting Championship
  - DFC Strawweight Championship (One Time)
- Cage Fury Fighting Championships
  - Cage Fury FC Strawweight Championship (One Time)

== Mixed martial arts record ==
Professional record breakdown
10 matches	7 wins	3 losses
By knockout	1	0
By submission	5	2
By decision	1	1

Res.	Record	Opponent	Method	Event	Date	Round	Time	Location	Notes
Loss	7–3	Cory McKenna	Submission (shoulder choke)	UFC on ESPN: Santos vs. Hill	August 6, 2022	2	1:03	Las Vegas, Nevada, United States	
Loss	7–2	Ashley Yoder	Decision (unanimous)	UFC Fight Night: Felder vs. dos Anjos	November 14, 2020	3	5:00	Las Vegas, Nevada, United States	
Loss	7–1	Amanda Lemos	Technical Submission (rear-naked choke)	UFC Fight Night: Edgar vs. The Korean Zombie	December 21, 2019	1	3:43	Busan, South Korea	
Win	7–0	Hannah Goldy	Decision (unanimous)	UFC on ESPN: Covington vs. Lawler	August 3, 2019	3	5:00	Newark, New Jersey, United States	Flyweight bout.
Win	6–0	Heloisa Azevedo	Submission (guillotine choke)	Cage Fury Fighting Championships 75	May 25, 2019	1	0:41	Coachella, California, United States	Won the inaugural Cage Fury FC Strawweight Championship.
Win	5–0	Jamie Colleen	Submission (armbar)	Cage Fury Fighting Championships 71	December 14, 2018	1	2:11	Atlantic City, New Jersey, United States	
Win	4–0	Amy Montenegro	Submission (guillotine choke)	Dominate Fighting Championship 2	September 15, 2018	1	2:45	Tacoma, Washington, United States	Won the vacant DFC Strawweight Championship.
Win	3–0	Jamie Thorton	TKO	COGA 61: Rumble on the Ridge 41	April 21, 2018	2	2:51	Snoqualmie, Washington, United States	
Win	2–0	Ivana Coleman	Submission (rear-naked choke)	COGA 60: Supreme Showdown 3	February 17, 2018	1	4:29	Tulalip, Washington, United States	
Win	1–0	Nikki Lowe	Submission (armbar)	COGA 58: Summer Showdown 4	August 25, 2017	1	2:30	Tulalip, Washington, United States	

== See also ==
- List of female mixed martial artists
