= UFC Fight Night: Felder vs. dos Anjos =

UFC mixed martial arts event in 2020

- The poster for UFC Fight Night: Felder vs. dos Anjos
- Promotion: Ultimate Fighting Championship
- Date: November 14, 2020
- Venue: UFC Apex
- City: Enterprise, Nevada, United States
- Attendance: None (behind closed doors)

Event chronology
UFC on ESPN: Santos vs. Teixeira	UFC Fight Night: Felder vs. dos Anjos	UFC 255: Figueiredo vs. Perez

UFC Fight Night: Felder vs. dos Anjos (also known as UFC Fight Night 182, UFC on ESPN+ 40 and UFC Vegas 14) was a mixed martial arts event produced by the Ultimate Fighting Championship that took place on November 14, 2020 at the UFC Apex facility in Enterprise, Nevada, part of the Las Vegas Metropolitan Area, United States.

== Background ==
A lightweight bout between former UFC Lightweight Champion Rafael dos Anjos and Islam Makhachev was expected to take place at UFC 254. However, dos Anjos tested positive for COVID-19 on October 8 and was pulled from the bout. The pairing was left intact and rescheduled to headline this event. In turn, it was reported on November 8 that Makhachev was forced to pull out of the event due to a staph infection. Paul Felder was announced as his replacement a day later.

A middleweight bout between Saparbek Safarov and Julian Marquez was initially slated for August 29 at UFC Fight Night: Smith vs. Rakić. However, Safarov faced travel restrictions related to the COVID-19 pandemic and the bout was moved to this event. In turn, Safarov pulled out due to weight cut issues a day before the event and the pairing was cancelled once again.

A middleweight bout between Andreas Michailidis and Antônio Arroyo was expected to take place at this event. However, Michailidis withdrew on October 23 due to undisclosed reasons and was replaced by Eryk Anders.

Gabriel Benítez was expected to face Justin Jaynes in a featherweight bout at the event. However, Benítez pulled out on October 27 due to testing positive for COVID-19 and the bout was scratched. The fight was rescheduled for UFC on ESPN: Hermansson vs. Vettori.

A women's strawweight bout between former Invicta FC Strawweight Champions Lívia Renata Souza and Kanako Murata was expected to take place at this event. However, Souza pulled out in early November due to an undisclosed injury and was replaced by Randa Markos.

A flyweight bout between Jeff Molina and Zarrukh Adashev was briefly expected to take place at this event, but was eventually rescheduled for UFC Fight Night 185.

Bryan Barberena was expected to face Daniel Rodriguez in a welterweight bout at this event. However, Barberena underwent an emergency laparotomy a week before the event due to "internal bleeding from a couple ruptured arteries in his omentum" and was sidelined indefinitely. Rodriguez was rebooked against Nicolas Dalby a week later at UFC 255.

At the weigh-ins, Abdul Razak Alhassan, Eryk Anders and Louis Smolka missed weight for their respective bouts. Alhassan weighed in at 172.5 pounds, one and a half pounds over the welterweight non-title fight limit. Anders weighed in at 187.5 pounds, one and a half pounds over the middleweight non-title fight limit. Smolka weighed in at 139 pounds, three pounds over the bantamweight non-title fight limit. All of their bouts were scheduled to proceed at catchweight and they were each fined 20% of their individual purses, which went to their opponents Khaos Williams, Antônio Arroyo and José Alberto Quiñónez respectively. However, both Anders and Smolka pulled out the next day as a consequence of their weight cuts. In turn, those latter two fights against Arroyo and Quiñónez were cancelled.

== Results ==
Main card (ESPN+)
Weight class				Method	Round	Time	Notes
Lightweight	Rafael dos Anjos	def.	Paul Felder	Decision (split) (47–48, 50–45, 50–45)	5	5:00
Catchweight (172.5 lb)	Khaos Williams	def.	Abdul Razak Alhassan	KO (punch)	1	0:30
Women's Strawweight	Ashley Yoder	def.	Miranda Granger	Decision (unanimous) (30–26, 29–27, 29–27)	3	5:00
Catchweight (195 lb)	Sean Strickland	def.	Brendan Allen	TKO (punches)	2	1:32
Women's Strawweight	Cory McKenna	def.	Kay Hansen	Decision (unanimous) (29–28, 29–28, 29–28)	3	5:00
Preliminary card (ESPN+)
Women's Strawweight	Kanako Murata	def.	Randa Markos	Decision (unanimous) (30–27, 30–27, 30–27)	3	5:00
Bantamweight	Tony Gravely	def.	Geraldo de Freitas	Decision (split) (30–27, 28–29, 29–28)	3	5:00
Welterweight	Alex Morono	def.	Rhys McKee	Decision (unanimous) (30–27, 30–27, 30–27)	3	5:00
Heavyweight	Don'Tale Mayes	def.	Roque Martinez	Decision (unanimous) (30–27, 30–27, 29–28)	3	5:00

== Bonus awards ==
The following fighters received $50,000 bonuses.

- Fight of the Night: Rafael dos Anjos vs. Paul Felder
- Performance of the Night: Khaos Williams and Sean Strickland

== See also ==
- List of UFC events
- List of current UFC fighters
- 2020 in UFC
