= Luis Peña (fighter) =

American mixed martial artist (born 1993)

- Born: Luis Antonio Peña; July 5, 1993 (age 33); Naples, Italy
- Other names: Violent Bob Ross
- Nationality: American
- Height: 6 ft 3 in (1.91 m)
- Weight: 161 lb (73 kg; 11 st 7 lb)
- Division: Lightweight; Featherweight
- Reach: 76 in (193 cm)
- Fighting out of: Coconut Creek, Florida, U.S.
- Team: American Top Team (2020–present); American Kickboxing Academy (formerly)
- Rank: Blue belt in Brazilian Jiu-Jitsu under Rodrigo Vaghi
- Years active: 2014–2024

Professional boxing record
- Total: 3
- Losses: 2
- By knockout: 1
- Draws: 1

Mixed martial arts record
- Total: 22
- Wins: 14
- By knockout: 4
- By submission: 6
- By decision: 4
- Losses: 8
- By submission: 3
- By decision: 5

Other information
- Boxing record from BoxRec
- Mixed martial arts record from Sherdog

Luis Antonio Peña (born July 5, 1993) is an American former professional mixed martial artist and boxer. A professional competitor since 2014, Peña competed in the Ultimate Fighting Championship (UFC), most notably being a contestant on The Ultimate Fighter: Undefeated season 27.

== Early life ==
Luis was born to parents in the Navy stationed in Naples, Italy, but was adopted at a young age by a Latino-American couple. He grew up beginning his wrestling career at Little Rock Central High School, becoming a well-known wrestler and claiming the state championship in the process.

== Mixed martial arts career ==
=== Early career ===
Peña took his first amateur mixed martial arts fight on August 9, 2014. He fought Darian Bradshaw, and won the fight via submission in the second round. Peña finished his amateur career with a record of 15–2. He made his professional debut in 2016, against Chris Petty. He won via knockout.

==== The Ultimate Fighter ====
Peña competed for Team Cormier on The Ultimate Fighter: Undefeated. He fought Jose Martinez Jr. on the third episode of the show, and won the fight via decision. Peña's run on the show was cut short, after suffering a foot injury during his quarterfinal fight. He was unable to fight for the rest of the show, but was guaranteed a spot on The Ultimate Fighter 27 Finale card by UFC president Dana White.

=== Ultimate Fighting Championships ===
Peña made his UFC debut on July 16, 2018, at The Ultimate Fighter 27 Finale against Richie Smullen. He won the fight via a submission in round one.

On November 10, 2018, Peña faced Michael Trizano at UFC Fight Night: Korean Zombie vs. Rodríguez. He lost the fight via split decision.

Peña faced Steven Peterson on March 23, 2019, at UFC Fight Night 148. At the weigh-ins, Luis Peña weighed in at 148.5 lbs, 2.5 pounds over the featherweight non-title fight limit of 146 lbs. Peña was fined 30% of his fight purse and the bout proceeded at catchweight. He won the fight via unanimous decision.

Peña faced Matt Wiman on June 22, 2019, at UFC on ESPN+ 12. He won the fight via technical knockout in round three.

Peña faced Matt Frevola on October 12, 2019, at UFC on ESPN+ 19. He lost the fight via split decision.

Peña was scheduled to face Alex Muñoz on February 29, 2020, at UFC Fight Night 169. However, on February 23, 2020, it was announced that Muñoz was pulled from the card due to injury, and he was replaced by Steve Garcia. He won the fight via unanimous decision.

Peña faced Khama Worthy on June 27, 2020, at UFC on ESPN: Poirier vs. Hooker. He lost the fight via a guillotine choke in round three. Peña was suspended four and a half months and fined 15% of his purse by the Nevada State Athletic Commission on September 3, 2020, after he tested positive for marijuana. The suspension was cut from the usual six months due to him taking the fight against Worthy on short notice: marijuana is only considered illegal by USADA during the competition window for fights. It is retroactive to June 17, 2020, and he will be eligible to compete again on November 2, 2020.

Peña was scheduled to face Drakkar Klose, replacing Jai Herbert, on February 20, 2021, at UFC Fight Night 185. However, the bout was canceled after Klose's corner tested positive for COVID-19.

Peña faced Alexander Munoz on April 17, 2021, at UFC on ESPN 22. He won the fight via split decision, with 11 out of 16 media scores giving it to Munoz.

Following his October arrest, the UFC announced that Peña had been released from the UFC.

=== Post UFC ===
Peña announced that he had signed with ACA and would be competing in the ACA Lightweight Grand Prix, with his first bout being against Eduard Vartanyan at ACA 139 on May 21, 2022. Pena would pull out of the bout due to having trouble securing a visa.

Peña was instead booked against Zach Zane in a 160 lb catchweight bout as the main event of Titan FC 76 on May 6, 2022. He won the bout via triangle choke under a minute into the first round.

Peña faced Gustavo Wurlitzer on June 3, 2022, at Titan FC 77. He won the bout at the end of the first round via TKO.

Peña faced Will Brooks at XMMA 5 on July 23, 2022. He lost the bout via unanimous decision.

Peña faced Michael Dufort at Aries Fight Series 16 on April 22, 2023. He lost the bout via submission in the first round.

Pena next fought Dedrek Sanders at Aries Fight Series 25 on April 6, 2024. He would snap his three fight losing streak beating Sanders via unanimous decision.

Pena next fought John Simon at Cage Titans 67 on September 14, 2024. He would lose the fight via unanimous decision.

Pena's next bout was against Zach DiSabatino at Cage Titans less than 2 months later on November 9, 2024. He would lose the fight via submission to an inverted triangle choke late in the third round. After the fight, Pena laid his gloves down in the middle of the cage, thus announcing his retirement and an end to his mixed martial arts career.

== Boxing career ==
Peña faced Vaughn Alexander on May 12, 2017, he lost the bout via TKO in the third round.

Peña faced Jarvis Williams on June 17, 2017, he lost the bout via Unanimous decision.

Peña faced Erasmo Garcia on November 18, 2017, the bout was deemed a Majority draw after two of the three judges scored the bout 57-57.

Peña faced Morgan Griggie on May 18, 2022, he lost the bout via Majority decision.

Peña faced James Rodriguez on April 29, 2023, he lost the bout via Majority decision.

== Legal troubles ==
=== June 2021 ===
On June 18, 2021, Peña was arrested in Florida on charges of strong-arm robbery, battery, and criminal mischief for an incident that allegedly took place on June 14, 2021. In early August 2021 news surfaced that Peña's charges had been downgraded to misdemeanor charges of simple battery and criminal mischief. He was, however, charged with another misdemeanor battery stemming from an incident that allegedly happened on May 22, 2021. However, his ex-girlfriend was not fully cooperative with the prosecution, leading to the charge being dismissed.

=== October 2021 ===
On October 9, 2021, Peña was arrested by Florida police officers for domestic battery after he allegedly struck and bit his girlfriend. Peña also allegedly struck another woman who witnessed the assault when she tried to intervene. On June 10, 2022, Peña pleaded not guilty to the charges via a written plea. In July 2023, Peña announced on his social media that the case was completely dismissed by the court.

=== November 2021 ===
On November 24, 2021, Peña was arrested in Broward County, Florida on four misdemeanor charges including battery, criminal mischief, battery causing bodily harm, and domestic battery. He was booked into the Rein Detention Center in Pompano Beach, Florida. In June 2022, it was revealed that the case was disposed without further information.

== Mixed martial arts record ==
Professional record breakdown
22 matches	14 wins	8 losses
By knockout	4	0
By submission	6	3
By decision	4	5

Res.	Record	Opponent	Method	Event	Date	Round	Time	Location	Notes
Win	14–8	Rafael Alves	TKO (submission to punches)	RCC Hard 21 x Gamebred FC	September 12, 2026	1	3:07	Chelyabinsk, Russia	Gamebred FC Lightweight Grand Prix Quarterfinal.
Win	13–8	Carlos Alexandre	Submission (rear-naked choke)	Gamebred Bareknuckle MMA 9	April 10, 2026	1	2:44	Santo Domingo, Dominican Republic	Gamebred FC Lightweight Grand Prix Round of 16.
Loss	12–8	Zach DiSabatino	Submission (inverted triangle choke)	Cage Titans 68	November 9, 2024	3	4:04	Plymouth, Massachusetts, United States	
Loss	12–7	John Simon	Decision (unanimous)	Cage Titans 67	September 14, 2024	3	5:00	Plymouth, Massachusetts, United States	
Win	12–6	Dedrek Sanders	Decision (unanimous)	Aries Fight Series 25	April 6, 2024	3	5:00	Knoxville, Tennessee, United States	Catchweight (160 lb) bout.
Loss	11–6	Michael Dufort	Submission (guillotine choke)	Aries Fight Series 16	April 22, 2023	1	1:27	Chattanooga, Tennessee, United States	
Loss	11–5	LT Nelson	Decision (unanimous)	Sparta 95	January 28, 2023	5	5:00	Aurora, Colorado, United States	King of Sparta Lightweight Tournament Final.
Loss	11–4	Will Brooks	Decision (split)	XMMA 5	July 23, 2022	3	5:00	Columbia, South Carolina, United States	Catchweight (160 lb) bout.
Win	11–3	Gustavo Wurlitzer	TKO (punches)	Titan FC 77	June 3, 2022	1	4:44	Miramar, Florida, United States	Catchweight (160 lb) bout.
Win	10–3	Zach Zane	Submission (triangle choke)	Titan FC 76	May 6, 2022	1	0:59	Miramar, Florida, United States	Catchweight (160 lb) bout.
Win	9–3	Alexander Muñoz	Decision (split)	UFC on ESPN: Whittaker vs. Gastelum	April 17, 2021	3	5:00	Las Vegas, Nevada, United States	
Loss	8–3	Khama Worthy	Submission (guillotine choke)	UFC on ESPN: Poirier vs. Hooker	June 27, 2020	3	2:53	Las Vegas, Nevada, United States	Peña tested positive for marijuana.
Win	8–2	Steve Garcia	Decision (unanimous)	UFC Fight Night: Benavidez vs. Figueiredo	February 29, 2020	3	5:00	Norfolk, Virginia, United States	
Loss	7–2	Matt Frevola	Decision (split)	UFC Fight Night: Joanna vs. Waterson	October 12, 2019	3	5:00	Tampa, Florida, United States	
Win	7–1	Matt Wiman	TKO (punches)	UFC Fight Night: Moicano vs. The Korean Zombie	June 22, 2019	3	1:14	Greenville, South Carolina, United States	Return to Lightweight.
Win	6–1	Steven Peterson	Decision (unanimous)	UFC Fight Night: Thompson vs. Pettis	March 23, 2019	3	5:00	Nashville, Tennessee, United States	Featherweight debut; Peña missed weight (148.5 lb).
Loss	5–1	Michael Trizano	Decision (split)	UFC Fight Night: The Korean Zombie vs. Rodríguez	November 10, 2018	3	5:00	Denver, Colorado, United States	
Win	5–0	Richie Smullen	Submission (guillotine choke)	The Ultimate Fighter: Undefeated Finale	July 6, 2018	1	3:32	Las Vegas, Nevada, United States	Performance of the Night.
Win	4–0	Kobe Wall	Submission (kimura)	Conflict MMA 44	July 22, 2017	3	1:40	Rome, Georgia, United States	Won the vacant Conflict MMA Lightweight Championship.
Win	3–0	Damir Ferhatbegovic	Submission (rear-naked choke)	Valor Fights 41	March 18, 2017	2	4:47	Elizabethton, Tennessee United States	Won the vacant VF Lightweight Championship.
Win	2–0	Brandon Schehl	Submission (rear-naked choke)	Shamrock FC 279	December 2, 2016	2	3:40	Kansas City, Missouri, United States	
Win	1–0	Chris Petty	KO (punch)	Fight Hard MMA: Gwaltney vs. Futrell	September 17, 2016	1	4:22	St. Charles, Missouri, United States	Lightweight debut.

=== Mixed martial arts exhibition record ===
Exhibition record breakdown		
1 match	1 win	0 losses
By decision	1	0

Res.	Record	Opponent	Method	Event	Date	Round	Time	Location	Notes
Win	1–0	Jose Martinez Jr.	Decision (unanimous)	The Ultimate Fighter: Undefeated	May 2, 2018 (airdate)	2	5:00	Las Vegas, Nevada, United States	TUF 27 Quarterfinal round.

== Professional boxing record ==
5 fights	0 wins	4 losses
By knockout	0	1
By decision	0	3
Draws	1	

No.	Result	Record	Opponent	Type	Round, time	Date	Location	Notes
5	Loss	0–4–1	(United States) James Rodriguez	MD	6	29 Apr 2023	(United States) Miccosukee Indian Gaming Resort Miami, Florida, US	
4	Loss	0–3–1	(United States) Morgan Griggie	MD	6	18 May 2022	(United States) Buckhead Fight Club, Atlanta, Georgia, US	
3	Draw	0–2–1	(Mexico) Erasmo Garcia	MD	6	17 Nov 2017	(United States) Clear Channell Metroplex Event Center, Little Rock, Arkansas, US	
2	Loss	0–2	(United States) Jarvis Williams	UD	6	17 Jun 2017	(United States) Pipefitters Union Hall, Saint Louis, Missouri, US	
1	Loss	0–1	(United States) Vaughn Alexander	TKO	3 (4)	12 May 2017	(United States) Heart of St. Charles Banquet Center, St. Charles, Missouri, US	

== See also ==
- List of male mixed martial artists
