= UFC on ESPN: Santos vs. Hill =

UFC mixed martial arts event in 2022

- The poster for UFC on ESPN: Santos vs. Hill
- Promotion: Ultimate Fighting Championship
- Date: August 6, 2022
- Venue: UFC Apex
- City: Enterprise, Nevada, United States
- Attendance: Not announced

Event chronology
UFC 277: Peña vs. Nunes 2	UFC on ESPN: Santos vs. Hill	UFC on ESPN: Vera vs. Cruz

UFC on ESPN: Santos vs. Hill (also known as UFC on ESPN 40 and UFC Vegas 59) was a mixed martial arts event produced by the Ultimate Fighting Championship that took place on August 6, 2022, at the UFC Apex facility in Enterprise, Nevada, part of the Las Vegas Metropolitan Area, United States.

== Background ==
A light heavyweight bout between former UFC Light Heavyweight title challenger Thiago Santos and Jamahal Hill headlined the event.

The heavyweight and women's flyweight finals of The Ultimate Fighter: Team Peña vs. Team Nunes took place at the event.

Former KSW Women's Flyweight Champion Ariane Lipski and Priscila Cachoeira were expected to meet in a flyweight bout at this event. They were previously scheduled to fight at UFC Fight Night: Błachowicz vs. Jacaré in November 2019, but Cachoeira withdrew after being suspended for the use of a diuretic. At the weigh-ins, Lipski weighed in at 128.5 pounds, two and a half pounds over the flyweight non-title fight limit. The bout was originally expected to proceed at catchweight with Lipski fined 20% of her purse. However, the fight was removed from the card on the day of the event due to Lipski not being medically cleared, and was postponed one week to UFC on ESPN: Vera vs. Cruz.

A featherweight bout between Nate Landwehr and Zubaira Tukhugov was expected to take place at the event. However, Tukhugov pulled out of the fight due to alleged visa issues which restricted his travel and was replaced by David Onama at UFC on ESPN: Vera vs. Cruz a week later.

A welterweight bout between Jason Witt and Josh Quinlan was expected to take place at this event. However, it was pushed back one week to UFC on ESPN: Vera vs. Cruz after Quinlan was pulled for an atypical drug finding: long-term metabolite (or M3 metabolite) of the steroid dehydrochloromethyltestosterone (DHCMT) in his urine sample.

== Results ==
Main card (ESPN / ESPN+)
Weight class				Method	Round	Time	Notes
Light Heavyweight	Jamahal Hill	def.	Thiago Santos	TKO (punches and elbows)	4	2:31
Welterweight	Geoff Neal	def.	Vicente Luque	KO (punches)	3	2:01
Heavyweight	Mohammed Usman	def.	Zac Pauga	KO (punches)	2	0:36	(Note: The Ultimate Fighter 30 Heavyweight tournament final.)
Women's Flyweight	Juliana Miller	def.	Brogan Walker	TKO (punches and elbows)	3	3:57	(Note: The Ultimate Fighter 30 Women's Flyweight tournament final.)
Heavyweight	Serghei Spivac	def.	Augusto Sakai	TKO (punches)	2	3:42
Lightweight	Terrance McKinney	def.	Erick Gonzalez	Submission (rear-naked choke)	1	2:17
Preliminary card (ESPN / ESPN+)
Middleweight	Michał Oleksiejczuk	def.	Sam Alvey	TKO (punches)	1	1:56
Welterweight	Bryan Battle	def.	Takashi Sato	KO (head kick)	1	0:44
Women's Strawweight	Cory McKenna	def.	Miranda Granger	Submission (Von Flue choke)	2	1:03
Women's Bantamweight	Mayra Bueno Silva	def.	Stephanie Egger	Submission (armbar)	1	1:17

== Bonus awards ==
The following fighters received $50,000 bonuses.

- Fight of the Night: Jamahal Hill vs. Thiago Santos
- Performance of the Night: Geoff Neal, Mohammed Usman, and Bryan Battle

== Aftermath ==
With ten finishes in ten bouts, this event ties UFC Fight Night: Rockhold vs. Bisping (and later UFC Freedom 250) for a 100 percent finish rate for all bouts in a single UFC event.

== See also ==
- List of UFC events
- List of current UFC fighters
- 2022 in UFC
