= Nate Maness =

American mixed martial artist

- Born: June 27, 1991 (age 35); Jackson, Tennessee, U.S.
- Other names: Mayhem
- Height: 5 ft 10 in (1.78 m)
- Weight: 135 lb (61 kg; 9 st 9 lb)
- Division: Lightweight (2013, 2016); Featherweight (2017, 2020); Bantamweight (2013–2015, 2018–2022); Flyweight (2022–present)
- Reach: 72 in (183 cm)
- Fighting out of: Henderson, Kentucky
- Team: Salvation MMA (formerly); TAG MMA; Nice Guy Submission Fighting
- Rank: Brown belt in Brazilian Jiu-Jitsu
- Years active: 2013–present

Mixed martial arts record
- Total: 19
- Wins: 16
- By knockout: 6
- By submission: 3
- By decision: 7
- Losses: 3
- By knockout: 1
- By submission: 1
- By decision: 1

Other information
- Mixed martial arts record from Sherdog

Nate Maness also known as Mayhem (born June 27, 1991) is an American mixed martial artist who competes in the bantamweight division of Bare Knuckle Fighting Championship as a bare-knuckle boxer. He competed in the Bantamweight division of the Ultimate Fighting Championship. As of April 13, 2026, he is #4 in the BKFC men's bantamweight rankings.

== Background ==
Maness played basketball throughout high school, aspiring to continue playing in college but instead opted to pursue a career in mixed martial arts.

== Mixed martial arts career ==
=== Early career ===
Maness made his amateur debut in 2013, winning four bouts before turning professional in the same year.

Outside the UFC, Nathan Maness collected three belts at three different weight classes, ranging from 135 through 155 lbs. in 12 professional fights, “Mayhem” won six of them via stoppage, four in the very first frame. After he won the bantamweight championship of the Quebec-based TKO promotion in 2018, his sole loss came when he dropped the belt to former UFC competitor Taylor Lapilus in May 2019 but came back with a first-round stoppage win in February in his next bout.

=== Ultimate Fighting Championship ===
Maness was scheduled to face Ray Borg on August 1, 2020, at UFC Fight Night: Brunson vs. Shahbazyan. However, Borg was removed from the fight on the day of the event's weigh-in for undisclosed reasons. Maness went on to face Johnny Muñoz Jr. in a featherweight bout. He won the close bout via unanimous decision. 5 out of 15 media scores gave it to Muñoz, 6 out of 10 gave it to Maness, and 4 scored it a draw.

Maness faced Luke Sanders on November 28, 2020, at UFC on ESPN: Blaydes vs. Lewis. He won the fight via second round submission. He earned a Performance of the Night bonus for the win.

Maness was scheduled to face Tony Gravely at UFC on ESPN: Whittaker vs. Gastelum on April 17, 2021. However, Maness was removed from the bout for undisclosed reasons.

The bout with Gravely was rescheduled for September 18, 2021, at UFC Fight Night: Smith vs. Spann. Maness won the fight via technical knockout in round two after being knocked down and almost finished in the first round. This win earned him the Performance of the Night award.

As the first bout of his new four-fight contract, Maness faced Umar Nurmagomedov on June 25, 2022, at UFC on ESPN 38. He lost the fight via unanimous decision.

Maness faced Tagir Ulanbekov on November 5, 2022, at UFC Fight Night 214. He lost the fight via a guillotine choke in the first round.

Maness was scheduled to face Zhalgas Zhumagulov on May 6, 2023, at UFC 288. However, Nate Maness pulled out of the fight due to injury and was replaced by UFC Newcomer Rafael Estevam, who was originally scheduled to face Carlos Candelario on April 22, 2023, at UFC Fight Night 222.

Maness faced Mateus Mendonça on October 7, 2023, at UFC Fight Night 229. He won the fight via TKO in the first round. This win earned him the Performance of the Night award.

Maness was scheduled to face Azat Maksum on February 3, 2024, at UFC Fight Night 235. However, Maness pulled out in early January due to injury and was replaced by Charles Johnson.

As the last bout of his prevailing contract, Maness faced Jimmy Flick on June 15, 2024, at UFC on ESPN 58. He won the fight by unanimous decision.

On June 29, 2024, it was reported that Maness was removed from UFC's roster. On an interview in July 2024, Maness stated that he was not given a reason for the non-renewal of his contract but hoped to return. Maness later stated that the UFC let him know that his bouts were not exciting, which is why he was not offered a new contract.

== Bare-knuckle boxing ==
On September 3, 2024, it was reported that Maness signed a multi-fight deal with the Bare Knuckle Fighting Championship (BKFC).

Maness made his BKFC debut against Nick Burgos on December 6, 2024 at BKFC 69. He won the fight by technical knockout at the end of the third round.

Maness faced Tyler Randall on October 18, 2025 at BKFC Fight Night 30. He won the fight by knockout in the second round.

Maness was scheduled to face Jamel Herring for the vacant BKFC Bantamweight Championship on May 22, 2026 at BKFC 89. However, Maness withdrew due to not being medically cleared and was replaced by Michael Larrimore.

== Personal life ==
Maness and his wife have a daughter (born 2022).

== Championships and accomplishments ==
=== Mixed martial arts ===
- Ultimate Fighting Championship
  - Performance of the Night (Three times) vs. Luke Sanders, Tony Gravely, and Mateus Mendonça
- Hard Rock MMA
  - HR MMA Featherweight Championship (One time; former)
- TKO Major League MMA
  - TKO Bantamweight Championship (One time; former)
- Warrior FC
  - Warrior FC Lightweight Championship (One time; former)
- Bluegrass Brawl
  - BB Bantamweight Championship (One time; former)

== Mixed martial arts record ==
Professional record breakdown
19 matches	16 wins	3 losses
By knockout	6	1
By submission	3	1
By decision	7	1

Res.	Record	Opponent	Method	Event	Date	Round	Time	Location	Notes
Win	16–3	Jimmy Flick	Decision (unanimous)	UFC on ESPN: Perez vs. Taira	June 15, 2024	3	5:00	Las Vegas, Nevada, United States	
Win	15–3	Mateus Mendonça	TKO (punches)	UFC Fight Night: Dawson vs. Green	October 7, 2023	1	4:40	Las Vegas, Nevada, United States	Performance of the Night.
Loss	14–3	Tagir Ulanbekov	Submission (guillotine choke)	UFC Fight Night: Rodriguez vs. Lemos	November 5, 2022	1	2:11	Las Vegas, Nevada, United States	Flyweight debut.
Loss	14–2	Umar Nurmagomedov	Decision (unanimous)	UFC on ESPN: Tsarukyan vs. Gamrot	June 25, 2022	3	5:00	Las Vegas, Nevada, United States	
Win	14–1	Tony Gravely	TKO (punches)	UFC Fight Night: Smith vs. Spann	September 18, 2021	2	2:10	Las Vegas, Nevada, United States	Return to Bantamweight. Performance of the Night.
Win	13–1	Luke Sanders	Submission (rear-naked choke)	UFC on ESPN: Smith vs. Clark	November 28, 2020	2	2:29	Las Vegas, Nevada, United States	Catchweight (140 lb) bout. Performance of the Night.
Win	12–1	Johnny Muñoz Jr.	Decision (unanimous)	UFC Fight Night: Brunson vs. Shahbazyan	August 1, 2020	3	5:00	Las Vegas, Nevada, United States	Muñoz was deducted one point in round 3 due to repeated groin strikes.
Win	11–1	Kellen VanCamp	KO (punches)	HR MMA 114	February 1, 2020	1	1:39	Shepherdsville, Kentucky, United States	Return to Featherweight. Won the vacant HRMMA Featherweight Championship.
Loss	10–1	Taylor Lapilus	KO (kick to the body)	TKO 48	May 24, 2019	3	1:22	Gatineau, Quebec, Canada	Lost the TKO Bantamweight Championship.
Win	10–0	Jesse Arnett	TKO (punches)	TKO 44	September 21, 2018	2	2:53	Québec City, Québec, Canada	Won the TKO Bantamweight Championship.
Win	9–0	Caio Machado	Decision (unanimous)	TKO 42	March 16, 2018	3	5:00	Laval, Québec, Canada	Return to Bantamweight.
Win	8–0	Marc McDonald	Submission (brabo choke)	Premier MMA Championship 3	May 27, 2017	2	4:10	Covington, Kentucky, United States	Featherweight debut.
Win	7–0	Brandon Bell	Decision (unanimous)	Warrior FC: Caged Chaos	September 17, 2016	3	5:00	Harlan, Kentucky, United States	Won the Warrior FC Lightweight Championship.
Win	6–0	Michael Ricketts	TKO (punches)	Colosseum Combat 33	October 10, 2015	1	3:42	Kokomo, Indiana, United States	
Win	5–0	Kodey Gulley	Decision (unanimous)	Fight Lab 45	March 28, 2015	3	5:00	Charlotte, North Carolina, United States	
Win	4–0	Isaiah Ferguson	Decision (split)	Hardrock MMA 69	November 8, 2014	3	5:00	Shepherdsville, Kentucky, United States	
Win	3–0	Brandon Sandefur	TKO (punches)	Hardrock MMA 60	February 1, 2014	1	3:13	Shepherdsville, Kentucky, United States	Return to Bantamweight.
Win	2–0	Jason Blackford	Submission (rear-naked choke)	Hardrock MMA 58	November 2, 2013	1	2:55	Bowling Green, Kentucky, United States	Lightweight debut.
Win	1–0	Jeremy Pender	Decision (unanimous)	Bluegrass Brawl 8	July 27, 2013	3	5:00	Lexington, Kentucky, United States	Bantamweight debut. Won the BB Bantamweight Championship.

== Bare knuckle record ==
Professional record breakdown
2 matches	2 wins	0 losses
By knockout	2	0

Res.	Record	Opponent	Method	Event	Date	Round	Time	Location	Notes
Win	2–0	Tyler Randall	KO	BKFC Fight Night Hammond: Henry vs. Stewart	October 18, 2025	2	0:45	Hammond, Indiana, United States	
Win	1–0	Nick Burgos	TKO	BKFC 69	December 6, 2024	3	1:59	Duluth, Georgia, United States	

== See also ==
- List of male mixed martial artists
