= Michael Trizano =

American mixed martial artist (born 1991)

- Born: Michael Charles Trizano; December 31, 1991 (age 34); New York City, New York, U.S.
- Other names: The Lone Wolf
- Height: 5 ft 11 in (1.80 m)
- Weight: 145 lb (66 kg; 10 st 5 lb)
- Division: Lightweight; Featherweight
- Reach: 73 in (185 cm)
- Fighting out of: Ramsey, New Jersey, United States
- Team: Team Tiger Schulmann (2009–present)
- Years active: 2016–present

Mixed martial arts record
- Total: 13
- Wins: 10
- By knockout: 3
- By submission: 2
- By decision: 5
- Losses: 3
- By knockout: 1
- By submission: 1
- By decision: 1

Other information
- Mixed martial arts record from Sherdog

Michael Charles Trizano (born December 31, 1991) is an American professional mixed martial artist who most recently competed in the Featherweight division of Ultimate Fighting Championship. A professional competitor since 2016, Trizano was the winner of The Ultimate Fighter: Undefeated season 27 (TUF 27).

== Background ==
Trizano grew up in Ramsey, New Jersey with two younger brothers. Mike joined Tiger Schulmann's martial arts academy at the age of 17. Trizano graduated high school and attended college. It was during this time he realized mixed martial arts was his passion and decided to pursue it full time. Mike Trizano is Italian American.

== Mixed martial arts career ==
=== Early career ===
Trizano took his first professional mixed martial arts fight on March 4, 2016. He fought James Gonzalez, and won the fight via unanimous decision. He went on, winning the next five fights before joining TUF 27.

=== The Ultimate Fighter ===
Trizano competed for Team Miocic on The Ultimate Fighter: Undefeated. He was scheduled to face Thailand Clark on the fifth episode of the show, and won the fight via technical knockout in round two. Trizano faced John Gunther on June 13, 2018. He won the fight via unanimous decision, and proceeded to face Joe Giannetti in the final of TUF 27.

=== Ultimate Fighting Championship ===
Trizano made his UFC debut on July 16, 2018, at The Ultimate Fighter 27 Finale against Joe Giannetti. He won the fight via split decision.

On November 10, 2018, Trizano faced Luis Peña at UFC Fight Night: The Korean Zombie vs. Rodríguez. He won the fight via split decision.

Trizano faced Grant Dawson on May 18, 2019, at UFC Fight Night: dos Anjos vs. Lee. He lost the fight via a rear-naked choke in round two.

Trizano was scheduled to meet Rafael Alves on February 20, 2021, at UFC Fight Night 185. However, on February 9, 2021, news surfaced that he was forced to withdraw from the bout due to an ankle injury.

Trizano faced Ľudovít Klein on May 8, 2021, at UFC on ESPN 24. He won the fight via unanimous decision. 11 out of 14 media scores gave the fight to Klein.

Trizano was expected to face Chas Skelly on October 9, 2021, at UFC Fight Night 194. However, two weeks before the event, Skelly was removed from the bout for undisclosed reasons and the bout was cancelled.

Trizano faced Hakeem Dawodu on February 5, 2022, at UFC Fight Night 200. He lost the fight via unanimous decision.

Trizano faced Lucas Almeida on June 4, 2022, at UFC Fight Night 207. He lost the back-and-forth bout via TKO in the third round. This fight earned him the Fight of the Night award.

Trizano faced Seung Woo Choi on November 12, 2022, at UFC 281. At the weigh-ins, Trizano weighed in at 147.6 pounds, one and six tenths of a pound over the featherweight non-title fight limit. The bout proceeded at a catchweight with Trizano fined 20% of his purse, which went to his opponent Choi. He won by TKO via punches at 4:51 of the first round. It was announced in mid-January that Trizano was no longer in UFC's roster as he fought out his contract and was not re-signed.

== Bare-knuckle boxing ==
=== Bare Knuckle Fighting Championship ===
Trizano was scheduled to make his debut against former Bellator MMA fighter Derek Campos in a lightweight bout at BKFC 61 on May 11, 2024. However, in early May 2024, the bout was removed for unknown reasons. Trizano faced Louie Lopez at BKFC 61 and won by knockout in the first round. This fight earned him the Knockout of the Night award.

Trizano was scheduled to face Phil Caracappa on October 4, 2025 at BKFC 82. However, for unknown reasons, Caracappa was replaced by JC Deleon. Trizano won the fight by knockout twenty seconds in the first round. This fight earned him another Knockout of the Night award.

== Championships and accomplishments ==
Mixed Martial Arts

- Ultimate Fighting Championship
  - The Ultimate Fighter: Undefeated Lightweight Tournament Winner
  - Fight of the Night (One time) vs. Lucas Almeida
- Ring of Combat
  - Ring of Combat Featherweight Championship (one time; former)
- Maverick MMA
  - Maverick MMA Lightweight Championship (one time; former)

=== Bare-knuckle boxing ===
- Bare Knuckle Fighting Championship
  - Knockout of the Night (Two times) vs. Louie Lopez and JC Deleon

== Mixed martial arts record ==
Professional record breakdown
13 matches	10 wins	3 losses
By knockout	3	1
By submission	2	1
By decision	5	1

Res.	Record	Opponent	Method	Event	Date	Round	Time	Location	Notes
Win	10–3	Seung Woo Choi	KO (punches)	UFC 281	November 12, 2022	1	4:51	New York City, New York, United States	Catchweight (147.6 lb) bout; Trizano missed weight.
Loss	9–3	Lucas Almeida	TKO (punches)	UFC Fight Night: Volkov vs. Rozenstruik	June 4, 2022	3	0:55	Las Vegas, Nevada, United States	Fight of the Night.
Loss	9–2	Hakeem Dawodu	Decision (unanimous)	UFC Fight Night: Hermansson vs. Strickland	February 5, 2022	3	5:00	Las Vegas, Nevada, United States	
Win	9–1	Ľudovít Klein	Decision (unanimous)	UFC on ESPN: Rodriguez vs. Waterson	May 8, 2021	3	5:00	Las Vegas, Nevada, United States	
Loss	8–1	Grant Dawson	Submission (rear-naked choke)	UFC Fight Night: dos Anjos vs. Lee	May 18, 2019	2	2:27	Rochester, New York, United States	Return to Featherweight.
Win	8–0	Luis Peña	Decision (split)	UFC Fight Night: The Korean Zombie vs. Rodríguez	November 10, 2018	3	5:00	Denver, Colorado, United States	
Win	7–0	Joe Giannetti	Decision (split)	The Ultimate Fighter: Undefeated Finale	July 6, 2018	3	5:00	Las Vegas, Nevada, United States	Return to Lightweight. Won The Ultimate Fighter 27 Lightweight Tournament.
Win	6–0	Mike Otwell	Submission (anaconda choke)	Bellator 186	November 3, 2017	2	2:07	University Park, Pennsylvania, United States	
Win	5–0	James Gonzalez	Decision (unanimous)	Ring of Combat 60	September 15, 2017	3	5:00	Atlantic City, New Jersey, United States	Won the vacant Ring of Combat Featherweight Championship.
Win	4–0	Eddie Lenoci	TKO (punches)	Ring of Combat 59	June 2, 2017	2	0:34	Atlantic City, New Jersey, United States	Return to Featherweight.
Win	3–0	Tim Kunkel	KO (punches)	Maverick MMA 1	April 7, 2017	1	0:51	Stroudsburg, Pennsylvania, United States	Lightweight debut. Won the Maverick MMA Lightweight Championship.
Win	2–0	Raul Gonzales	Submission (rear-naked choke)	Ring of Combat 55	June 3, 2016	1	3:59	Atlantic City, New Jersey, United States	Featherweight debut.
Win	1–0	James Gonzalez	Decision (Unanimous)	Ring of Combat 54	March 4, 2016	3	3:00	Atlantic City, New Jersey, United States	Catchweight (150 lb) bout.

== Mixed martial arts exhibition record ==
Exhibition record breakdown		
2 matches	2 wins	0 losses
By knockout	1	0
By decision	1	0

Res.	Record	Opponent	Method	Event	Date	Round	Time	Location	Notes
Win	2–0	John Gunther	Decision (unanimous)	The Ultimate Fighter: Undefeated	Jun 13, 2018 (airdate)	3	5:00	Las Vegas, Nevada, United States	The Ultimate Fighter 27 Semi-final round.
Win	1–0	Thailand Clark	TKO (punches)	The Ultimate Fighter: Undefeated	May 16, 2018 (airdate)	2	4:50	Las Vegas, Nevada, United States	The Ultimate Fighter 27 Quarterfinal round.

== Bare knuckle boxing record ==
Professional record breakdown
2 matches	2 wins	0 losses
By knockout	2	0

Res.	Record	Opponent	Method	Event	Date	Round	Time	Location	Notes
Win	2–0	JC Deleon	KO	BKFC 82	October 4, 2025	1	0:20	Newark, New Jersey, United States	Knockout of the Night.
Win	1–0	Louie Lopez	KO (punches)	BKFC 61	May 11, 2024	1	1:02	Uncasville, Connecticut, United States	Knockout of the Night.

== See also ==
- List of male mixed martial artists
