= Tony Gravely =

American mixed martial arts fighter (born 1991)

- Born: Antonio Lamar Gravely; September 28, 1991 (age 35); Martinsville, Virginia, U.S.
- Height: 5 ft 5 in (1.65 m)
- Weight: 135 lb (61 kg; 9 st 9 lb)
- Division: Bantamweight
- Reach: 69 in (175 cm)
- Fighting out of: Coconut Creek, Florida, U.S.
- Team: Tech MMA & Fitness Academy (2013–2020); American Top Team (2020–present)
- Rank: Black belt in Taekwondo; Purple belt in Brazilian Jiu-Jitsu
- Wrestling: NCAA Division I Wrestling
- Years active: 2015–present

Mixed martial arts record
- Total: 32
- Wins: 23
- By knockout: 10
- By submission: 3
- By decision: 10
- Losses: 9
- By knockout: 1
- By submission: 5
- By decision: 3

Other information
- University: Appalachian State University
- Mixed martial arts record from Sherdog
Medal record
Men's collegiate wrestling
Representing the Appalachian State Mountaineers
SoCon Championships
Gold medal – first place	2010 Davidson	125 lb
Gold medal – first place	2012 Chattanooga	125 lb

Tony Gravely (born September 28, 1991) is an American mixed martial artist who competes in the Bantamweight division. A professional since 2015, he is most notable for his time in the Ultimate Fighting Championship.

== Background ==
Gravely's father was a taekwondo instructor for over 25 years, so he started taekwondo when he was about three or four years old. He trained and competed in taekwondo, until he started wrestling in sixth grade. He continued wrestling from sixth grade all the way through college.

A native of Martinsville, Virginia, Gravely attended Magna Vista High School, where he was a four-time all-state wrestler. He had two undefeated seasons and was a two-time Virginia wrestling state champion.

After high school, Gravely attended Appalachian State University in Boone, North Carolina. In three seasons wrestling for the Mountaineers, Gravely qualified for two NCAA tournaments and won two Southern Conference championships. He graduated Appalachian State with a major in construction management.

According to the Martinsville Bulletin, Gravely quit his construction project manager day job in 2016 and decided to focus full-time on an MMA career. He trained at Tech MMA Academy in Southwest Virginia for years, as he pursued a career as a professional fighter.

== Mixed martial arts career ==
=== Early career ===
Following a 6-1 amateur career, Gravely had his first professional fight in October 2015 against Chad Wiggington. He won the fight at the Elite 8 Warrior Challenge in a unanimous decision to claim his first victory. In his second bout, Gravely lost to Pat Sabatini by first-round rear-naked choke submission at CFFC 52.

After a six fight winning streak, Gravely suffered dropped three of his next four fights, getting submitted by Ricky Bandejas in the second round, outpointed by Merab Dvalishili, and armbarred by Manny Bermudez. For his lone outing with Legacy Fighting Alliance at LFA 17, Gravely defeated Keith Richardson via unanimous decision. He also defeated Jerrell Hodge and Jordan Morales. On the strength of that run, Gravely challenged Patchy Mix (11-0) for the KOTC Bantamweight Championship at KOTC: No Retreat in May 2018. Gravely was submitted by the first round, falling to Mix's dangerous guillotine. Gravely defeated his next three foes via TKO that saw wins over Drako Rodriguez, earning him the KOTC Bantamweight Championship and James Quigg. In the main event of CES MMA 53, he knocked out Kody Nordby in the first round for the CES MMA Bantamweight Championship. Gravely would defend his CES MMA title twice with back to back stoppages at CES MMA 54 where he knocked out Kris Moutinho in the fourth round and CES MMA 55 where Gravely submitted Darren Mima in round two via rear-naked choke.

Gravely got his break in UFC when he was selected to be a part of Dana White's Contender Series 24 in 2019. He earned the formal invite to join the UFC after recording a knockout of Ray Rodriguez in the third round of his Contender Series fight.

=== Ultimate Fighting Championship ===
Gravely made his UFC debut against Brett Johns on January 25, 2020, at UFC Fight Night: Blaydes vs. dos Santos. He lost the fight via a rear-naked choke in round three. This bout earned him the Fight of the Night award. Brett Johns in Raleigh, North Carolina. After his debut, Gravely announced he would be moving to Florida to train with American Top Team.

Gravely faced Geraldo de Freitas on November 14, 2020, at UFC Fight Night: Felder vs. dos Anjos. He won the fight via unanimous decision.

Gravely was scheduled to face Nate Maness at UFC on ESPN: Whittaker vs. Gastelum on April 17, 2021. However, Maness was removed from the bout for undisclosed reasons and he was replaced by Anthony Birchak. Gravely won the fight via technical knockout in round two. This fight earned him a Performance of the Night award.

The bout with Maness was rescheduled for September 18, 2021, at UFC Fight Night: Smith vs. Spann. Gravely lost the fight via technical knockout in round two.

Gravely faced promotional newcomer Saimon Oliveira on January 22, 2022, at UFC 270. He won the fight via unanimous decision.

Gravely faced Johnny Muñoz Jr. on June 4, 2022, at UFC Fight Night 207. He won the bout in the first round after knocking down Muñoz after the latter ran into an uppercut on a takedown attempt.

Gravely faced Javid Basharat on September 17, 2022, at UFC Fight Night 210. He lost the bout via unanimous decision.

Gravely faced Victor Henry on March 11, 2023, at UFC Fight Night 221. He lost the fight via split decision.

On June 5, 2023, news surfaced that Gravely had fought out his contract and the organization opted not to renew it.

== Championships and accomplishments ==
- Ultimate Fighting Championship
  - Fight of the Night (One time) vs. Brett Johns
  - Performance of the Night (One time) vs. Anthony Birchak
  - Tied (Raul Rosas Jr.) for fifth most takedowns landed in UFC Bantamweight division history (33)
- CES MMA
  - CES MMA Bantamweight Championship (One time)
    - Two successful defenses
- King of the Cage
  - King of the Cage Bantamweight Championship (One time)
- Fight Lab
  - Fight Lab Bantamweight Championship (One time)
- PA Cage Fight
  - PACF Bantamweight Championship (One time)

== Mixed martial arts record ==
Professional record breakdown
32 matches	23 wins	9 losses
By knockout	10	1
By submission	3	5
By decision	10	3

Res.	Record	Opponent	Method	Event	Date	Round	Time	Location	Notes
Loss	23–9	Victor Henry	Decision (split)	UFC Fight Night: Yan vs. Dvalishvili	March 11, 2023	3	5:00	Las Vegas, Nevada, United States	
Loss	23–8	Javid Basharat	Decision (unanimous)	UFC Fight Night: Sandhagen vs. Song	September 17, 2022	3	5:00	Las Vegas, Nevada, United States	
Win	23–7	Johnny Muñoz Jr.	KO (punches)	UFC Fight Night: Volkov vs. Rozenstruik	June 4, 2022	1	1:08	Las Vegas, Nevada, United States	
Win	22–7	Saimon Oliveira	Decision (unanimous)	UFC 270	January 22, 2022	3	5:00	Anaheim, California, United States	
Loss	21–7	Nate Maness	TKO (punches)	UFC Fight Night: Smith vs. Spann	September 18, 2021	2	2:10	Las Vegas, Nevada, United States	
Win	21–6	Anthony Birchak	TKO (punches)	UFC on ESPN: Whittaker vs. Gastelum	April 17, 2021	2	1:31	Las Vegas, Nevada, United States	Performance of the Night.
Win	20–6	Geraldo de Freitas	Decision (split)	UFC Fight Night: Felder vs. dos Anjos	November 15, 2020	3	5:00	Las Vegas, Nevada, United States	
Loss	19–6	Brett Johns	Submission (rear-naked choke)	UFC Fight Night: Blaydes vs. dos Santos	January 25, 2020	3	2:53	Raleigh, North Carolina, United States	Fight of the Night.
Win	19–5	Ray Rodriguez	TKO (punches)	Dana White's Contender Series 24	August 13, 2019	3	2:16	Las Vegas, Nevada, United States	
Win	18–5	Darren Mima	Submission (rear-naked choke)	CES 55: Wells vs. de Jesus	March 29, 2019	2	4:54	Hartford, Connecticut, United States	Defended the CES Bantamweight Championship.
Win	17–5	Kris Moutinho	KO (punches)	CES 54: Andrews vs. Logan	January 19, 2019	4	4:02	Lincoln, Rhode Island, United States	Defended the CES Bantamweight Championship.
Win	16–5	Kody Nordby	KO (slam)	CES 53: Gravely vs. Nordby	November 2, 2018	1	0:36	Lincoln, Rhode Island, United States	Won the vacant CES Bantamweight Championship.
Win	15–5	Drako Rodriguez	TKO (punches)	KOTC: Territorial Conflict	September 15, 2018	5	3:49	Niagara Falls, New York, United States	Won the vacant KOTC Bantamweight Championship.
Win	14–5	Bruno Ferreira	TKO (punches)	Road to M-1 USA	August 11, 2018	1	N/A	Nashville, Tennessee, United States	
Win	13–5	James Quigg	TKO	Fight Lab 59	June 22, 2018	3	1:08	Charlotte, North Carolina, United States	Won the Fight Lab Bantamweight Championship.
Loss	12–5	Patchy Mix	Submission (guillotine choke)	King of the Cage: No Retreat	May 12, 2018	1	1:44	Salamanca, New York, United States	For the KOTC Flyweight Championship.
Win	12–4	Jerrell Hodge	Decision (unanimous)	CFFC 68	October 21, 2017	3	5:00	Atlantic City, New Jersey, United States	
Win	11–4	Jordan Morales	Decision (unanimous)	PA Cage Fight 29	September 22, 2017	3	5:00	Wilkes Barre, Pennsylvania, United States	Won the PACF Bantamweight Championship.
Win	10–4	Keith Richardson	Decision (unanimous)	LFA 17	July 21, 2017	3	5:00	Charlotte, North Carolina, United States	Catchweight (140 lb) bout.
Win	9–4	Francis Healy	Decision (unanimous)	KOTC: Heavy Hands	May 13, 2017	3	5:00	Washington, Pennsylvania, United States	Featherweight bout.
Loss	8–4	Manny Bermudez	Submission (armbar)	Cage Titans 33	April 8, 2017	1	N/A	Plymouth, Massachusetts, United States	
Loss	8–3	Merab Dvalishvili	Decision (unanimous)	Ring of Combat 57	November 18, 2016	3	5:00	Atlantic City, New Jersey, United States	
Win	8–2	Tim Sosa	Decision (unanimous)	KOTC: Harm's Way	September 17, 2016	3	5:00	Washington, Pennsylvania, United States	
Loss	7–2	Ricky Bandejas	Submission (rear-naked choke)	CFFC 60	August 6, 2016	2	2:32	Atlantic City, New Jersey, United States	
Win	7–1	Dave Roberts	TKO (punches)	CFFC 58	May 21, 2016	3	2:37	Atlantic City, New Jersey, United States	
Win	6–1	Dylan Cala	Submission (rear-naked choke)	Cage Rage 4	April 16, 2016	1	3:01	Greensboro, North Carolina, United States	
Win	5–1	Paul Grant	TKO (punches)	Ring of Combat 54	March 4, 2016	3	1:02	Atlantic City, New Jersey, United States	
Win	4–1	Reginald Barnett Jr.	Decision (unanimous)	Elite Warrior Challenge 9	February 6, 2016	3	5:00	Salem, Virginia, United States	
Win	3–1	Dwayne Holman Jr.	Decision (unanimous)	CFFC 55: Chookagian vs. Varela	January 9, 2016	3	5:00	Atlantic City, New Jersey, United States	Return to Bantamweight.
Win	2–1	Vladimir Kazbekov	Submission (rear-naked choke)	Global Proving Ground 22	November 21, 2015	2	4:20	Mt. Laurel, New Jersey, United States	Catchweight (130 lb) bout.
Loss	1–1	Pat Sabatini	Submission (rear-naked choke)	CFFC 52: Horcher vs. Regman	October 31, 2015	1	2:47	Atlantic City, New Jersey, United States	Featherweight debut.
Win	1–0	Chad Wiggington	Decision (unanimous)	Elite Warrior Challenge 8	October 10, 2015	3	5:00	Salem, Virginia, United States	Bantamweight debut.

== See also ==
- List of male mixed martial artists
