= UFC on ESPN: Whittaker vs. Gastelum =

UFC mixed martial arts event in 2021

- The poster for UFC on ESPN: Whittaker vs. Gastelum
- Promotion: Ultimate Fighting Championship
- Date: April 17, 2021
- Venue: UFC Apex
- City: Enterprise, Nevada, United States
- Attendance: None (behind closed doors)

Event chronology
UFC on ABC: Vettori vs. Holland	UFC on ESPN: Whittaker vs. Gastelum	UFC 261: Usman vs. Masvidal 2

UFC on ESPN: Whittaker vs. Gastelum (also known as UFC on ESPN 22 and UFC Vegas 24) was a mixed martial arts event produced by the Ultimate Fighting Championship that took place on April 17, 2021, at the UFC Apex facility in Enterprise, Nevada, part of the Las Vegas Metropolitan Area, United States.

== Background ==
A middleweight bout between former UFC Middleweight Champion Robert Whittaker (also The Ultimate Fighter: The Smashes welterweight winner) and former middleweight title challenger Paulo Costa was expected to serve as the main event. However, Costa withdrew from the fight on March 16 due to a severe flu. He was replaced by former interim title challenger and The Ultimate Fighter: Team Jones vs. Team Sonnen middleweight winner Kelvin Gastelum. They were head coaches on The Ultimate Fighter: Heavy Hitters and Whittaker was expected to defend his title against Gastelum at UFC 234 in February 2019, but pulled out hours before that event due to a collapsed bowel and an internal hernia that required emergency surgery.

A bantamweight bout between Tony Gravely and Nate Maness was scheduled to take place at the event. However, Maness was removed from the bout for undisclosed reasons and replaced by Anthony Birchak.

Former Invicta FC Atomweight Champion and UFC Women's Strawweight Championship challenger Jessica Penne and Hannah Goldy were expected to meet in a women's strawweight bout at UFC 260, but Goldy tested positive for COVID-19 and the bout was postponed. They were then rescheduled for this event. A week before the event, Goldy pulled out once again and was replaced by promotional newcomer Lupita Godinez.

A heavyweight bout between Parker Porter and Chase Sherman was scheduled to take place at the event. However, Porter was removed from the bout on April 7 due to undisclosed reasons and replaced by former UFC Heavyweight Champion Andrei Arlovski.

Natan Levy was expected to face Austin Hubbard in a lightweight bout at this event. However, Levy pulled out of the bout a week before it took place due to an injury. Hubbard faced promotional newcomer Dakota Bush instead.

Ricardo Ramos was scheduled to face Bill Algeo in a bantamweight bout at the event. However, Ramos was pulled from the fight during the week leading up to the event after testing positive for COVID-19 and the contest was cancelled. The pairing remained intact and was rescheduled for UFC Fight Night: Font vs. Garbrandt

At the weigh-ins, Tracy Cortez and Zarah Fairn Dos Santos missed weight for their respective bouts. Cortez weighed in at 126.5 pounds, half a pound over the women's flyweight non-title fight limit. Her bout proceeded at a catchweight and she was fined 20% of her individual purse, which went to her opponent Justine Kish. Fairn weighed in at 147 pounds, eight pounds over the pre-established limit of 139 pounds (the bout was originally set for the women's bantamweight division, but was shifted to a catchweight prior to the start of the weigh-ins). Her bout against Josiane Nunes was cancelled due to the weight discrepancy, as Nunes weighed in at 136 pounds.

A lightweight bout between Jeremy Stephens and Drakkar Klose was expected to take place as the co-main event. However, Klose withdrew citing injuries that he claimed were triggered by a Stephens shove at the weigh-ins and the bout was pulled from the card just hours before the event.

== Results ==
Main card (ESPN / ESPN+)
Weight class				Method	Round	Time	Notes
Middleweight	Robert Whittaker	def.	Kelvin Gastelum	Decision (unanimous) (50–45, 50–45, 50–45)	5	5:00
Heavyweight	Andrei Arlovski	def.	Chase Sherman	Decision (unanimous) (29–28, 29–28, 29–28)	3	5:00
Middleweight	Jacob Malkoun	def.	Abdul Razak Alhassan	Decision (unanimous) (30–27, 30–27, 30–27)	3	5:00
Catchweight (126.5 lb)	Tracy Cortez	def.	Justine Kish	Decision (split) (29–28, 28–29, 30–27)	3	5:00
Lightweight	Luis Peña	def.	Alexander Munoz	Decision (split) (28–29, 29–28, 29–28)	3	5:00
Preliminary card (ESPN / ESPN+)
Heavyweight	Alexander Romanov	def.	Juan Espino	Technical Decision (split) (29–28, 28–29, 29–28)	3	1:05	(Note: Accidental knee to the groin rendered Romanov unable to continue.)
Women’s Strawweight	Jessica Penne	def.	Lupita Godinez	Decision (split) (29–28, 28–29, 29–28)	3	5:00
Middleweight	Gerald Meerschaert	def.	Bartosz Fabiński	Technical Submission (guillotine choke)	1	2:00
Lightweight	Austin Hubbard	def.	Dakota Bush	Decision (unanimous) (29–28, 29–28, 29–28)	3	5:00
Bantamweight	Tony Gravely	def.	Anthony Birchak	TKO (punch)	2	1:31

== Bonus awards ==
The following fighters received $50,000 bonuses.

- Fight of the Night: Robert Whittaker vs. Kelvin Gastelum
- Performance of the Night: Gerald Meerschaert and Tony Gravely

== See also ==
- List of UFC events
- List of current UFC fighters
- 2021 in UFC
