= The Ultimate Fighter: Undefeated =

UFC mixed martial arts television series and event in 2018

- Genre: Reality, Sports
- Created by: Craig Piligian, Frank Fertitta III, Lorenzo Fertitta, Dana White
- Starring: Dana White, Stipe Miocic, Daniel Cormier
- Country of origin: United States

Production
- Running time: 60 minutes

Original release
- Network: Fox Sports 1
- Release: April 18 – July 4, 2018

The Ultimate Fighter: Undefeated (also known as The Ultimate Fighter 27) is an installment of the Ultimate Fighting Championship (UFC)-produced reality television series The Ultimate Fighter. Tryouts were announced on November 16, 2017, scheduled for 26 days later. This season featured undefeated featherweights and lightweights. The coaches for this season were announced on January 26, 2018, pitting current UFC Heavyweight Champion Stipe Miocic against current UFC Light Heavyweight Champion Daniel Cormier. The cast was announced on the same day.

== Cast ==
=== Coaches ===
Team Miocic:
- Stipe Miocic, Head Coach
- Chris Camozzi
- Dustin Jacoby
- James Krause
- Gian Villante
- Joe Warren
- Marc Montoya
- Tyler Diamond
Team Cormier:
- Daniel Cormier, Head Coach
- Javier Mendez
- Cain Velasquez
- Bob Cook
- Leandro Vieira
- Lucas Mangano
- Deron Winn
- Dulani Perry

 

=== Fighters ===
- Team Miocic
  - Featherweights: Kyler Phillips, Suman Mokhtarian, Jay Cucciniello and Dulani Perry.
  - Lightweights: Michael Trizano, John Gunther, José Martinez Jr. and Allan Zuñiga.
- Team Cormier
  - Featherweights: Tyler Diamond, Bryce Mitchell, Brad Katona and Ricky Steele.
  - Lightweights: Richie Smullen, Luis Peña, Joe Giannetti and Thailand Clark.

== Episodes ==
Episode 1: Good Day for a Fight (April 18, 2018)

- Season 27 begins as MMA stars Stipe Miocic and Daniel Cormier captain teams of undefeated lightweight and featherweight fighters competing for a UFC contract.
- Team Cormier wins the coin toss for the 1st pick and the fighters were picked in the following order:

| Coach | 1st Pick | 2nd Pick | 3rd Pick | 4th Pick | 5th Pick | 6th Pick | 7th Pick | 8th Pick |
|---|---|---|---|---|---|---|---|---|
| Cormier | Tyler Diamond (FW) | Bryce Mitchell (FW) | Richie Smullen (LW) | Luis Peña (LW) | Joe Giannetti (LW) | Brad Katona (FW) | Thailand Clark (LW) | Ricky Steele (FW) |
| Miocic | Kyler Phillips (FW) | Suman Mokhtarian (FW) | Mike Trizano (LW) | John Gunther (LW) | José Martinez Jr. (LW) | Jay Cucciniello (FW) | Allan Zuñiga (LW) | Dulani Perry (FW) |

- With control of fight selection for the first matchup, coach Miocic chooses his No. 4 pick John Gunther (6–0) to take on Team Cormier's No. 5 pick Joe Giannetti (6–0) in a lightweight matchup.
- Joe Giannetti defeated John Gunther via technical submission (guillotine choke) in Round 1
- Team Miocic retains control of fight selection, and with a featherweight bout up next, Miocic selects his No. 1 pick Kyler Phillips to fight Team Cormier's No. 6 pick Brad Katona.

Episode 2: Fight or Flight (April 25, 2018)

- Stipe Miocic gets creative and pranks Cormier, redecorating the opposing team's locker room with photos of himself including a naked photo. Cormier then shows his own business to Miocic and his team.
- Thailand Clark has a heated exchange with Cormier over training too hard during practice and he needs to relax or leave.
- Brad Katona defeated Kyler Phillips via majority decision in Round 2.
- With this featherweight win, Cormier is in control and picks his first lightweight fight: José Martinez vs. Luis Peña.

Episode 3: Pressure Makes Diamonds (May 2, 2018)

- Dulani Perry gets on his teammates nerves and his loud-mouth, cocky attitude rub them the wrong way while in the TUF house and in the team van on the way to the gym.
- After cutting weight, Luis Peña becomes irritable and has choice words for Suman Mokhtarian whose greeting at breakfast was too loud for him.
- Luis Peña defeated José Martinez Jr. via unanimous decision in Round 2.
- Cormier announces the next featherweight fight: Bryce Mitchell vs. Jay Cucciniello.

Episode 4: Straight Savage (May 9, 2018)

- Due to an obligation in his home state of Louisiana, Cormier leaves Cain Valequez in charge of his team and cornering the upcoming fight.
- After his fight, Luis Peña suffers a foot injury and has to go the doctor. The x-rays show a fracture to the distal second metatarsal fracture, so has to wear a splint for 4–6 weeks and is out of the competition. However, Dana White tells him, "Heal up, and you'll be in the finale.
- Bryce Mitchell defeated Jay Cucciniello via unanimous decision in Round 2.
- With Team Cormier, now 4–0, Dulani Perry of Team Miocic voices his frustration to them.
- Cormier announces the next lightweight fight: Mike Trizano vs. Thailand Clark.

Episode 5: Break His Will (May 16, 2018)

- Since they're 4–0, a Luis Peña and Tyler Diamond from Team Cormier decide to get inside the heads of the Team Miocic fighters by changing their TUF Undefeated sign in their locker room to "defeated", much to the dislike of assistant coach Marc Montoya.
- During grappling practice, Suman Mokhtarian injures his right knee and gets help from the UFC Performance Institute where the trainer is worried about his meniscus and the soft tissue around his knee. Team Cormier assistant coach Deron Winn walks in the trainer's room and makes several joking remarks about Suman's condition. His comments continue outside the locker rooms at the gym and tempers flare.
- Mike Trizano defeated Thailand Clark via TKO (punches) in Round 2.
- With Miocic in control of the fight pick, he announces the next featherweight fight: Suman Mokhtarian vs. Ricky Steele.

Episode 6: Dig Down Deep (May 23, 2018)

- Trying to get in his possible opponents' heads, Team Miocic fighter Dulani Perry talks trash to Team Cormier, asking whoever wants to fight him, to step outside.
- At separate times, Jay Cucciniello and John Gunther, both Team Miocic fighters who lost their first-round matches, sought out Dana White to ask him to take the injured Luis Peña's spot in the competition.
- Ricky Steele defeated Suman Mokhtarian via unanimous decision in Round 2.
- Back in control, Cormier announces the last preliminary lightweight fight: Richie Smullen vs. Allan Zuñiga.

Episode 7: The Cookie Crumbles (May 30, 2018)

- After his fight, Ricky Steele doesn't feel well and comes back to the TUF house donning crutches. Along with injuring his feet, his head still hurts. When he refuses medical treatment, Cormier forces him to see a neurologist, who tells him he has symptoms of a concussion and he cannot clear him for the next fight.
- For medical reasons (cramping legs), Richie Smullen was not able to compete and was medically disqualified. Dana White is not amused and suspects a mental issue to be the reason of his calf cramps. He takes a look at the hurt Smullen and, seeing that Smullen can barely stand, declares Team Miocic's Allan Zuñiga as the official winner.
- Cormier announces the last preliminary featherweight fight: Tyler Diamond vs. Dulani Perry.

Episode 8: Face Your Fears (June 6, 2018)

- Richie Smullen returns from the hospital and the blood test showed that the reason why he couldn't feel his legs is that his muscles broke down. Enzymes went into his bloodstream and then into his kidneys. It's caused by over-training.
- With Luis Peña and now Ricky Steele out of the competition due to a concussion, there are two spots open. Team Miocic fighters, Kyler Phillips, Jay Cuccinello and John Gunther are itching to replace them and get back into the tournament.
- Suman Mokhtarian receives bad news from the doctor and his MRI results showed an ACL tear and, needing surgery, he's out of the competition.
- Tyler Diamond defeated Dulani Perry via submission (guillotine) in Round 2.
- After the fight, Dana White calls in both coaches and asks who they want back into the tournament. Since Dana isn't interested in Cormier's remaining fighters, it's up to Miocic and he picks Jay Cuccinello and John Gunther to receive another shot and continue in the competition.
- Miocic and Cormier announces the semi-final fights:
  - Mike Trizano vs. John Gunther
  - Brad Katona vs. Bryce Mitchell
  - Joe Giannetti vs. Allan Zuñiga
  - Jay Cuccinello vs. Tyler Diamond

Episode 9: Guns Blazing (June 13, 2018)

- Both coaches take their teams out for a break from the TUF house by taking them to Exotics Racing where they get to put the pedal to the metal down the racetrack in their choice of a Lamborghini, Porsche, and Ferrari.
- During training, Cormier brings in his training teammates, UFC fighters Luke Rockhold and Max Holloway to give his fighters advice while in the sauna.
- The fighters decide to host a talent show at the TUF house. And despite John Gunter and Mike Trizano fighting each other, they steal the show with their comedy routine.
- Mike Trizano defeated John Gunther via unanimous decision in Round 3.
- The next semi-final fight is featherweights Brad Katona vs. Bryce Mitchell.

Episode 10: Embrace It (June 20, 2018)

- TUF 15 winner Michael Chiesa pays a visit to the UFC gym to impart some wisdom he learned during his time on the show to Team Cormier.
- The fighters are treated to watching UFC on Fox: Emmett vs. Stephens and Miocic and his assistant coaches bring pizza and drinks while Cormier gives his team a shout out while broadcasting the fights.
- Brad Katona defeated Bryce Mitchell via submission (rear naked choke) in Round 3.
- The next semi-final fight is lightweights Joe Giannetti vs. Allan Zuñiga.

Episode 11: Ready For War (June 27, 2018)

- Miocic and Cormier go head-to-head on the ice while playing hockey in this season's coaches challenge. Dana White sets up the challenge at City National Arena, the practice facility of the Las Vegas Golden Knights, where they will compete in a hockey shoot-out. With the help of the Golden Knights assistant coach Ryan Craig and announcer Shane Hnidy, the coaches will take turns as goalie and shooter trying to score on each other. The coach who shoots first gets 10 chances to score as many goals as possible then swap positions. The second coach then gets a chance to beat the first coach's score to determine the winner. The winning coach will get $10,000, earning each fighter $1,500. Miocic wins the coin toss and elects to be the goal tender and blocks more than half of Cormier's shots while Cormier, even though he's not used to being on ice skates, blocks the last 7 pucks in a row and wins only by one blocked shot.
- Cormier and his assistant coaches visit the fighters at the TUF house with an Xbox One and a mini trophy to have a UFC 3 video game tournament. Joe Giannetti and Luis Peña get to the finals and Peña wins the last match in three rounds.
- Joe Giannetti defeated Allan Zuñiga via submission (rear naked choke) in Round 1.
- The next semi-final fight is featherweights Jay Cucciniello vs. Tyler Diamond.

Episode 12: Blood, Sweat, and Tears (July 4, 2018)

- Cormier holds a team dinner at the TUF house, where his fighters enjoy a meal cooked by his personal chef Joe Zanelli along with help from designated "sous chef" Bryce Mitchell.
- Jay Cucciniello defeated Tyler Diamond via TKO (strikes) in Round 3.
- The TUF finale is set:
  - Lightweights: Mike Trizano vs. Joe Giannetti.
  - Featherweights: Brad Katona vs. Jay Cucciniello.

== Tournament bracket ==
=== Lightweight (155lb) bracket ===
Quarter-finals
Mike Trizano | TKO
Thailand Clark | 2
José Martinez Jr. | UD
Luis Peña | 2
John Gunther | 1
Joe Giannetti | SUB
Allan Zuñiga | DQ
Richie Smullen | —

Semi-finals
Mike Trizano | UD
John Gunther* | 3
Joe Giannetti | SUB
Allan Zuñiga | 1

Final
Mike Trizano | SD
Joe Giannetti | 3

* Peña was pulled from the competition due to a fractured foot and was replaced by Gunther.

=== Featherweight (145lb) bracket ===
Quarter-finals
Kyler Phillips | 2
Brad Katona | MD
Jay Cucciniello | 2
Bryce Mitchell | UD
Suman Mokhtarian | 2
Ricky Steele | UD
Dulani Perry | 2
Tyler Diamond | SUB

Semi-finals
Brad Katona | SUB
Bryce Mitchell | 3
Jay Cucciniello * | TKO
Tyler Diamond | 3

Final
Brad Katona | UD
Jay Cucciniello | 3

* Steele pulled out due to a concussion and was replaced by Cucciniello.

Legend
| | Team Miocic |
| | Team Cormier |
| UD | Unanimous Decision |
| MD | Majority Decision |
| SUB | Submission |
| (T)KO | (Technical) Knock Out |
| DQ | Disqualification |

== The Ultimate Fighter 27 Finale ==
The Ultimate Fighter: Undefeated Finale
- The poster for The Ultimate Fighter: Undefeated Finale
- Promotion: Ultimate Fighting Championship
- Date: July 6, 2018
- Venue: Pearl Theatre
- City: Paradise, Nevada
- Attendance: 2,123
- Total gate: $293,615.50

Event chronology
| UFC Fight Night: Cowboy vs. Edwards | The Ultimate Fighter: Undefeated Finale | UFC 226: Miocic vs. Cormier |

The Ultimate Fighter 27 Finale (also known as The Ultimate Fighter: Undefeated Finale) was a mixed martial arts event produced by the Ultimate Fighting Championship that was held on July 6, 2018, at the Pearl Theatre in Paradise, Nevada, part of the Las Vegas metropolitan area.

=== Background ===
The featherweight and lightweight finals of The Ultimate Fighter: Undefeated took place at the event.

A middleweight bout between Brad Tavares and Israel Adesanya headlined the event. On June 7, it was announced that Tavares was dealing with a foot injury, but his team announced that he was still competing in the fight. Thiago Santos was announced as the replacement if Tavares was to pull out.

A women's flyweight bout between former Invicta FC Flyweight Champion Barb Honchak and former UFC Women's Flyweight Championship challenger Roxanne Modafferi was expected to take place at The Ultimate Fighter: A New World Champion Finale. However, on the day of the weigh in, Sijara Eubanks was pulled from her main event fight due to kidney failure while trying to make weight. Eubanks was replaced by Modafferi to face Nicco Montaño for the inaugural UFC Women's Flyweight Championship and Honchak faced former Invicta FC Bantamweight Champion Lauren Murphy who replaced Modafferi. The rematch (they previously met at a regional event in October 2011) between Honchak and Modafferi took place at this event.

At the weigh-ins, Julian Marquez weighed in at 190 lb, four pounds over the middleweight limit of 186. He was fined 30% of his fight purse and the bout proceeded at a catchweight.

=== Results ===
Main card (Fox Sports 1)
| Weight class | | | | Method | Round | Time | Notes |
|---|---|---|---|---|---|---|---|
| Middleweight | Israel Adesanya | def. | Brad Tavares | Decision (unanimous) (49–46, 50–45, 50–45) | 5 | 5:00 |
| Lightweight | Michael Trizano | def. | Joe Giannetti | Decision (split) (29–28, 28–29, 29–28) | 3 | 5:00 | (Note: The Ultimate Fighter 27 Lightweight tournament final.) |
| Featherweight | Brad Katona | def. | Jay Cucciniello | Decision (unanimous) (30–26, 30–26, 30–26) | 3 | 5:00 | (Note: The Ultimate Fighter 27 Featherweight tournament final.) |
| Featherweight | Alex Caceres | def. | Martín Bravo | Decision (split) (28–29, 29–28, 29–28) | 3 | 5:00 |
| Women's Flyweight | Roxanne Modafferi | def. | Barb Honchak | TKO (elbows) | 2 | 3:32 |
| Catchweight (190 lb) | Alessio Di Chirico | def. | Julian Marquez | Decision (split) (27–30, 29–28, 29–28) | 3 | 5:00 |
Preliminary card (Fox Sports 1)
| Women's Flyweight | Montana De La Rosa | def. | Rachael Ostovich | Submission (rear-naked choke) | 3 | 4:21 |
| Lightweight | Luis Peña | def. | Richie Smullen | Submission (guillotine choke) | 1 | 3:32 |
| Lightweight | John Gunther | def. | Allan Zuñiga | Decision (majority) (29–28, 29–28, 28–28) | 3 | 5:00 |
| Featherweight | Bryce Mitchell | def. | Tyler Diamond | Decision (majority) (29–28, 29–28, 28–28) | 3 | 5:00 |
Preliminary card (UFC Fight Pass)
| Featherweight | Steven Peterson | def. | Matt Bessette | Decision (split) (29–28, 28–29, 29–28) | 3 | 5:00 |
| Middleweight | Gerald Meerschaert | def. | Oskar Piechota | Technical Submission (rear-naked choke) | 2 | 4:55 |

=== Bonus awards ===
The following fighters received $50,000 bonuses:

- Fight of the Night: Alex Caceres vs. Martín Bravo
- Performance of the Night: Israel Adesanya and Luis Peña

=== Reported payout ===
The following is the reported payout to the fighters as reported to the Nevada State Athletic Commission. It does not include sponsor money and also does not include the UFC's traditional "fight night" bonuses.

- Israel Adesanya: $112,000 ($56,000 win bonus) def. Brad Tavares: $56,000
- Mike Trizano: $30,000 (includes $15,000 win bonus) def. Joe Giannetti: $15,000
- Brad Katona: $30,000 ($15,000 win bonus) def. Jay Cucciniello: $15,000
- Alex Caceres: $84,000 ($42,000 win bonus) def. Martín Bravo: $25,000
- Roxanne Modafferi: $50,000 ($25,000 win bonus) def. Barb Honchak: $10,000
- Alessio Di Chirico: $39,600 ($18,000 win bonus) def. Julian Marquez: $8,400 ^
- Montana De La Rosa: $24,000 ($12,000 win bonus) def. Rachael Ostovich: $12,000
- Luis Peña: $20,000 ($10,000 win bonus) def. Richie Smullen: $10,000
- John Gunther: $20,000 ($10,000 win bonus) def. Allan Zuniga: $10,000
- Bryce Mitchell: $20,000 ($10,000 win bonus) def. Tyler Diamond: $10,000
- Steven Peterson: $20,000 ($10,000 win bonus) def. Matt Bessette: $12,000
- Gerald Meerschaert: $36,000 ($18,000 win bonus) def. Oskar Piechota: $14,000

^ Marquez was fined $3,600, 30 percent of his purse for failing to make the required weight for his fight with Alessio Di Chirico. That money was issued to Di Chirico, an NSAC official confirmed.

== Coaches' Fight ==
UFC 226: Miocic vs. Cormier was held on July 7, 2018, at the T-Mobile Arena in Paradise, Nevada, part of the Las Vegas metropolitan area.

- Heavyweight Championship bout: Stipe Miocic(c) vs. Daniel Cormier.

Daniel Cormier defeated Stipe Miocic via KO (punches) at 4:33 of the first round.

== See also ==
- The Ultimate Fighter
- List of UFC events
- 2018 in UFC
- List of current UFC fighters
