= Cory McKenna =

Welsh mixed martial arts fighter

- Born: July 11, 1999 (age 27); Cwmbran, Wales
- Other names: Poppins
- Height: 5 ft 3 in (1.60 m)
- Weight: 115 lb (52 kg; 8 st 3 lb)
- Division: Strawweight
- Reach: 58.0 in (147 cm)
- Fighting out of: Cwmbran, Wales
- Team: Team Alpha Male
- Rank: Brown belt in jiu-jitsu.
- Years active: 2018–present

Mixed martial arts record
- Total: 12
- Wins: 8
- By knockout: 2
- By submission: 2
- By decision: 4
- Losses: 4
- By submission: 1
- By decision: 3

Other information
- Mixed martial arts record from Sherdog

Cory McKenna (born 11 July 1999) is a Welsh professional mixed martial artist who competed as a strawweight for the Ultimate Fighting Championship. She has also competed for Cage Warriors.

== Early life and background ==
Born in Wales, McKenna spent the majority of her childhood in Colchester, England due to her father's role in the army. Her mother, Wendy, also competes in mixed martial arts and has a professional record of 1–2.

McKenna began training in karate aged 10, and after advancing through Muay Thai, Brazilian jiu-jitsu and boxing, started training in mixed martial arts aged 13. She became a full-time athlete two years later while occasionally coaching to help fund fights. As an amateur, McKenna went 7–0 and held championships at strawweight and featherweight.

== Mixed martial arts career ==
=== Cage Warriors ===
In March 2018, McKenna made her professional debut at Cage Warriors 91 and beat Maria Vittoria Colonna after a first-round retirement. She faced Eva Dourthe three months later at Cage Warriors 94 and won via split decision. In September 2018, McKenna suffered her first defeat after a split decision loss against Micol Di Segni at Cage Warriors 97.

In April 2019, McKenna faced Fannie Redman at Cage Warriors 104. She won the fight via rear naked choke in the second round. A month later, she beat Giulia Chinello at Cage Warriors 105 via ground and pound in the first round. In October 2019, McKenna was due to fight Griet Eeckhout at Cage Warriors 108, but the fight was cancelled after her opponent failed to make weight. In April 2020, her fight with Lanchana Green was also called off after Cage Warriors 114 was cancelled due to COVID-19 restrictions.

=== Dana White's Contender Series ===
On 11 August 2020, McKenna appeared on Dana White's Contender Series 2020. After winning via unanimous decision against Vanessa Demopoulos, McKenna was awarded a UFC contract. The deal saw her became the first Welsh female and youngest ever British fighter to sign for the promotion.

=== Ultimate Fighting Championship ===
McKenna made her promotional debut against Kay Hansen on 14 November 2020 at UFC Fight Night: Felder vs. dos Anjos. She won the fight via unanimous decision.

In her sophomore performance, she faced Elise Reed on 19 March 2022, at UFC Fight Night: Volkov vs. Aspinall. She lost the fight via split decision.

McKenna faced Miranda Granger on 6 August 2022 at UFC on ESPN 40. She won the fight via a shoulder choke in round two.

McKenna faced Cheyanne Vlismas on 17 December 2022 at UFC Fight Night 216. She won the fight via unanimous decision.

McKenna faced Jaqueline Amorim on 16 March 2024 at UFC Fight Night 239. She lost the bout via an armbar submission in the first round.

McKenna was scheduled to face Polyana Viana on 12 October 2024 at UFC Fight Night 244. However, Viana withdrew from the fight for unknown reasons and was replaced by Julia Polastri. McKenna lost the fight by split decision.

On 15 October 2024, it was reported that McKenna was removed from the UFC roster.

== Championships and accomplishments ==
- Violent Money TV
  - VMTV UK MMA Submission of the Year 2022

== Personal life ==
McKenna is a keen painter and often shares her artwork on Instagram.

== Mixed martial arts record ==
Professional record breakdown
12 matches	8 wins	4 losses
By knockout	2	0
By submission	2	1
By decision	4	3

Res.	Record	Opponent	Method	Event	Date	Round	Time	Location	Notes
Loss	8–4	Julia Polastri	Decision (split)	UFC Fight Night: Royval vs. Taira	October 12, 2024	3	5:00	Las Vegas, Nevada, United States	
Loss	8–3	Jaqueline Amorim	Submission (armbar)	UFC Fight Night: Tuivasa vs. Tybura	March 16, 2024	1	1:38	Las Vegas, Nevada, United States	
Win	8–2	Cheyanne Vlismas	Decision (unanimous)	UFC Fight Night: Cannonier vs. Strickland	December 17, 2022	3	5:00	Las Vegas, Nevada, United States	
Win	7–2	Miranda Granger	Submission (Von Flue choke)	UFC on ESPN: Santos vs. Hill	August 6, 2022	2	1:03	Las Vegas, Nevada, United States	
Loss	6–2	Elise Reed	Decision (split)	UFC Fight Night: Volkov vs. Aspinall	March 19, 2022	3	5:00	London, England	
Win	6–1	Kay Hansen	Decision (unanimous)	UFC Fight Night: Felder vs. dos Anjos	November 14, 2020	3	5:00	Las Vegas, Nevada, United States	
Win	5–1	Vanessa Demopoulos	Decision (unanimous)	Dana White's Contender Series 28	August 11, 2020	3	5:00	Las Vegas, Nevada, United States	
Win	4–1	Giulia Chinello	TKO (punches)	Cage Warriors 105	May 31, 2019	1	2:15	Colchester, England	
Win	3–1	Fannie Redman	Submission (rear-naked choke)	Cage Warriors 104	April 27, 2019	2	2:06	Cardiff, Wales	
Loss	2–1	Micol Di Segni	Decision (split)	Cage Warriors 97	September 29, 2018	3	5:00	Cardiff, Wales	
Win	2–0	Eva Dourthe	Decision (split)	Cage Warriors 94	June 16, 2018	3	5:00	Antwerp, Belgium	
Win	1–0	Maria Vittoria Colonna	TKO (corner stoppage)	Cage Warriors 91	March 3, 2018	1	5:00	Newport, Wales	Strawweight debut.

== See also ==
- List of female mixed martial artists
