= Suman Mokhtarian =

Australian MMA fighter (1992–2025)

- Born: 13 June 1992
- Died: 8 October 2025
- Fighting out of: Sydney, New South Wales, Australia

Suman Mokhtarian (13 June 1992 – 8 October 2025) was an Australian mixed martial arts fighter and coach. He was murdered at Riverstone on 8 October 2025 in a targeted gun attack by the Alameddine crime network after a previous attempt in February 2024. He was featured as a participant on The Ultimate Fighter: Undefeated. He was the brother of mixed martial artist Ashkan Mokhtarian.
