= UFC Fight Night: dos Anjos vs. Lee =

UFC mixed martial arts event in 2019

- The poster for UFC Fight Night: dos Anjos vs. Lee
- Promotion: Ultimate Fighting Championship
- Date: May 18, 2019
- Venue: Blue Cross Arena
- City: Rochester, New York
- Attendance: 8,132
- Total gate: $643,000

Event chronology
UFC 237: Namajunas vs. Andrade	UFC Fight Night: dos Anjos vs. Lee	UFC Fight Night: Gustafsson vs. Smith

UFC Fight Night: dos Anjos vs. Lee (also known as UFC Fight Night 152 or UFC on ESPN+ 10) was a mixed martial arts event produced by the Ultimate Fighting Championship that was held on May 18, 2019 at Blue Cross Arena in Rochester, New York.

== Background ==
The event marked the promotion's first visit to Rochester, New York.

A welterweight bout between former UFC Lightweight Champion Rafael dos Anjos and former interim lightweight title challenger Kevin Lee served as the event headliner.

Elizeu Zaleski dos Santos was briefly linked to a welterweight matchup with Neil Magny at the event. However on March 28, dos Santos announced that he had not been contacted by the UFC about the match. Magny was instead scheduled to face Vicente Luque. In turn, Magny pulled out of the bout on May 13 due to testing positive for Di-Hydroxy-LGD-4033. He was replaced by promotional newcomer Derrick Krantz.

== Results ==
Main Card (ESPN+)
Weight class				Method	Round	Time	Notes
Welterweight	Rafael dos Anjos	def.	Kevin Lee	Submission (arm-triangle choke)	4	3:47
Middleweight	Ian Heinisch	def.	Antônio Carlos Júnior	Decision (unanimous) (29–28, 29–28, 29–28)	3	5:00
Women's Featherweight	Felicia Spencer	def.	Megan Anderson	Submission (rear-naked choke)	1	3:24
Welterweight	Vicente Luque	def.	Derrick Krantz	TKO (punches)	1	3:52
Lightweight	Charles Oliveira	def.	Nik Lentz	TKO (punches)	2	2:11
Lightweight	Davi Ramos	def.	Austin Hubbard	Decision (unanimous) (30–27, 30–27, 30–27)	3	5:00
Preliminary Card (ESPN+)
Women's Bantamweight	Aspen Ladd	def.	Sijara Eubanks	Decision (unanimous) (30–26, 29–27, 29–28)	3	5:00
Lightweight	Desmond Green	def.	Charles Jourdain	Decision (unanimous) (30–27, 30–27, 29–28)	3	5:00
Welterweight	Michel Pereira	def.	Danny Roberts	KO (flying knee and punch)	1	1:47
Featherweight	Grant Dawson	def.	Michael Trizano	Submission (rear-naked choke)	2	2:27
Light Heavyweight	Ed Herman	def.	Patrick Cummins	TKO (knee and punches)	1	3:39
Middleweight	Zak Cummings	def.	Trevin Giles	Submission (guillotine choke)	3	4:01
Featherweight	Julio Arce	def.	Julian Erosa	KO (head kick)	3	1:49

== Bonus awards ==
The following fighters received $50,000 bonuses:

- Fight of the Night: Aspen Ladd vs. Sijara Eubanks
- Performance of the Night: Michel Pereira and Grant Dawson

== See also ==
- List of UFC events
- 2019 in UFC
- List of current UFC fighters
- Mixed martial arts in New York
