= Leah Letson =

American mixed martial arts fighter (born 1992)

- Born: Leah Letson; August 21, 1992 (age 34); Wisconsin, United States
- Nickname: Nidas
- Height: 5 ft 7 in (1.70 m)
- Weight: 145 lb (66 kg; 10 st 5 lb)
- Division: Bantamweight (2014–2017, 2022–present); Featherweight (2017–2021)
- Reach: 71 in (180 cm)
- Style: Taekwondo, Karate, Brazilian jiu-jitsu
- Fighting out of: Milwaukee, Wisconsin
- Team: Wanderley Jiu-Jitsu; Pura Vida BJJ
- Rank: 3rd Degree Black Belt in Taekwondo; 2nd Degree Black Belt in Karate
- Years active: 2014–2022

Mixed martial arts record
- Total: 7
- Wins: 5
- By knockout: 3
- By decision: 2
- Losses: 2
- By knockout: 1
- By decision: 1

Other information
- University: University of Wisconsin–Milwaukee (BA, Criminology) (BA, Psychology)
- Mixed martial arts record from Sherdog

Leah Letson (born August 21, 1992) is a retired American female mixed martial artist who competed in the Featherweight divisions of the Ultimate Fighting Championship. She reached a career-best ranking of #9 at Women's Featherweight on Fight Matrix on January 7, 2017.

== Early life and career ==
Leah Letson was born on 21 August 1992 in Wisconsin, United States. Letson started martial arts at five, earning her 2nd degree Karate black belt at age eleven, and her third degree Taekwondo black belt at fourteen. Letson moved to Milwaukee to attend the University of Wisconsin–Milwaukee where she started kickboxing, then on the advice of her coaches Brazilian jiu-jitsu (BJJ). While at UW Letson enlisted in the Air National Guard in 2012 and after completing basic training she started training MMA. On November 9, 2013, she won her first amateur fight, a year later she had her first pro fight.

== Mixed martial arts career ==
=== Early career ===
After losing her debut via split decision against Christina Jobe at KOTC: Industrial Strength on November 22, 2014, Letson won her next 4 bouts, knocking out Shaena Cox in the second round, defeating Allanna Jones via unanimous decision, stopping Sarah Payan via TKO in the first round, culminating with a victory at Invicta FC 21, where Letson faced UFC veteran Elizabeth Phillips, knocking her out with a headkick in the first round.

=== The Ultimate Fighter ===
In 2018, Letson was a contestant on The Ultimate Fighter: Heavy Hitters. She was the fourth pick for Team Whittaker. Letson won the quarterfinal bout against Bea Malecki by unanimous decision.

In the semi-finals, Letson faced Macy Chiasson. She lost the bout by way of knockout in round one. In January 2018 the UFC offered her a contract.

=== Ultimate Fighting Championship ===
Letson made her UFC debut at the Ultimate Fighter finale, beating Julija Stoliarenko via split decision.

Letson was scheduled to face Sarah Moras on May 4, 2019, at UFC Fight Night 151. However, Letson was removed from the fight in early April for an unspecified medical issue and replaced by Macy Chiasson.

Letson faced Felicia Spencer on November 13, 2021, at UFC Fight Night 197. She lost the fight via technical knockout in round three.

Letson was scheduled to face UFC newcomer Chelsea Chandler on October 1, 2022, at UFC Fight Night: Dern vs. Yan in a women's bantamweight bout. However, Letson pulled out in late August for personal reasons and was replaced by Julija Stoliarenko.

On January 9, 2023, Letson announced she was retiring from MMA due to losing love for the sport and its taxing nature.

== Mixed martial arts record ==
Professional record breakdown
7 matches	5 wins	2 losses
By knockout	3	1
By decision	2	1

Res.	Record	Opponent	Method	Event	Date	Round	Time	Location	Notes
Loss	5–2	Felicia Spencer	TKO (elbows and punches)	UFC Fight Night: Holloway vs. Rodríguez	November 13, 2021	3	4:25	Las Vegas, Nevada, United States	
Win	5–1	Julija Stoliarenko	Decision (split)	The Ultimate Fighter: Heavy Hitters Finale	November 30, 2018	3	5:00	Las Vegas, Nevada, United States	
Win	4–1	Elizabeth Phillips	KO (head kick)	Invicta FC 21: Anderson vs. Tweet	January 14, 2017	1	1:18	Kansas City, Missouri, United States	Featherweight debut.
Win	3–1	Sarah Payant	TKO (punches)	Premier FC 20	July 30, 2016	1	4:22	Springfield, Massachusetts, United States	
Win	2–1	Allanna Jones	Decision (unanimous)	KOTC: Blood Enemies	May 21, 2016	3	5:00	Washington, Pennsylvania, United States	
Win	1–1	Shaena Cox	KO (punch)	Pure FC 2	November 14, 2015	2	0:50	Milwaukee, Wisconsin, United States	
Loss	0–1	Christina Jobe	Decision (split)	KOTC: Industrial Strength	November 22, 2014	3	5:00	Carlton, Minnesota, United States	Bantamweight debut.

=== Mixed martial arts exhibition record ===
Exhibition record breakdown		
2 matches	1 win	1 loss
By knockout	0	1
By decision	1	0

Res.	Record	Opponent	Method	Event	Date	Round	Time	Location	Notes
Loss	1–1	Macy Chiasson	KO (knees to the body)	The Ultimate Fighter: Heavy Hitters	November 28, 2018 (airdate)	1	3:04	Las Vegas, Nevada, United States	The Ultimate Fighter 28 Women's Featherweight semi-final round.
Win	1–0	Bea Malecki	Decision (unanimous)	The Ultimate Fighter: Heavy Hitters	October 24, 2018 (airdate)	2	5:00	Las Vegas, Nevada, United States	The Ultimate Fighter 28 Women's Featherweight quarter-final round.

== Military career ==
Leah enlisted with the Air National Guard at the age of 19, serving as a Command and Control Specialist with Volk Field Wisconsin. In 2017 she deployed to the middle east for 6.5 months. During that deployment she ran a jujitsu club teaching members from multiple branches and foreign militia the strategic art of jujitsu. In 2021 she transferred to the 128 Air Refueling Wing(ARW) in Milwaukee retraining as an Aircraft Metals Tech. After retiring from fighting in December 2022 she was quickly selected as a full time recruiter for the 128 ARW. When asked what inspired the career move she said “I can help change someone's life for the better and give them opportunities that they otherwise wouldn't have. It's extremely rewarding.”

== Awards and decorations ==
- 2015 LT Col Thomas A Reis Award for volunteer work in her community, being an outstanding Airmen and graduating Magna cum laude from UW Milwaukee.
- 2018 Achievement Medal
- 2021 Commendation Medal

== Personal life ==
In 2016 Letson graduated with degrees in psychology and in criminal justice with a minor in sociology.

== See also ==
- List of female mixed martial artists
