= Pannie Kianzad =

Swedish-Iranian mixed martial artist

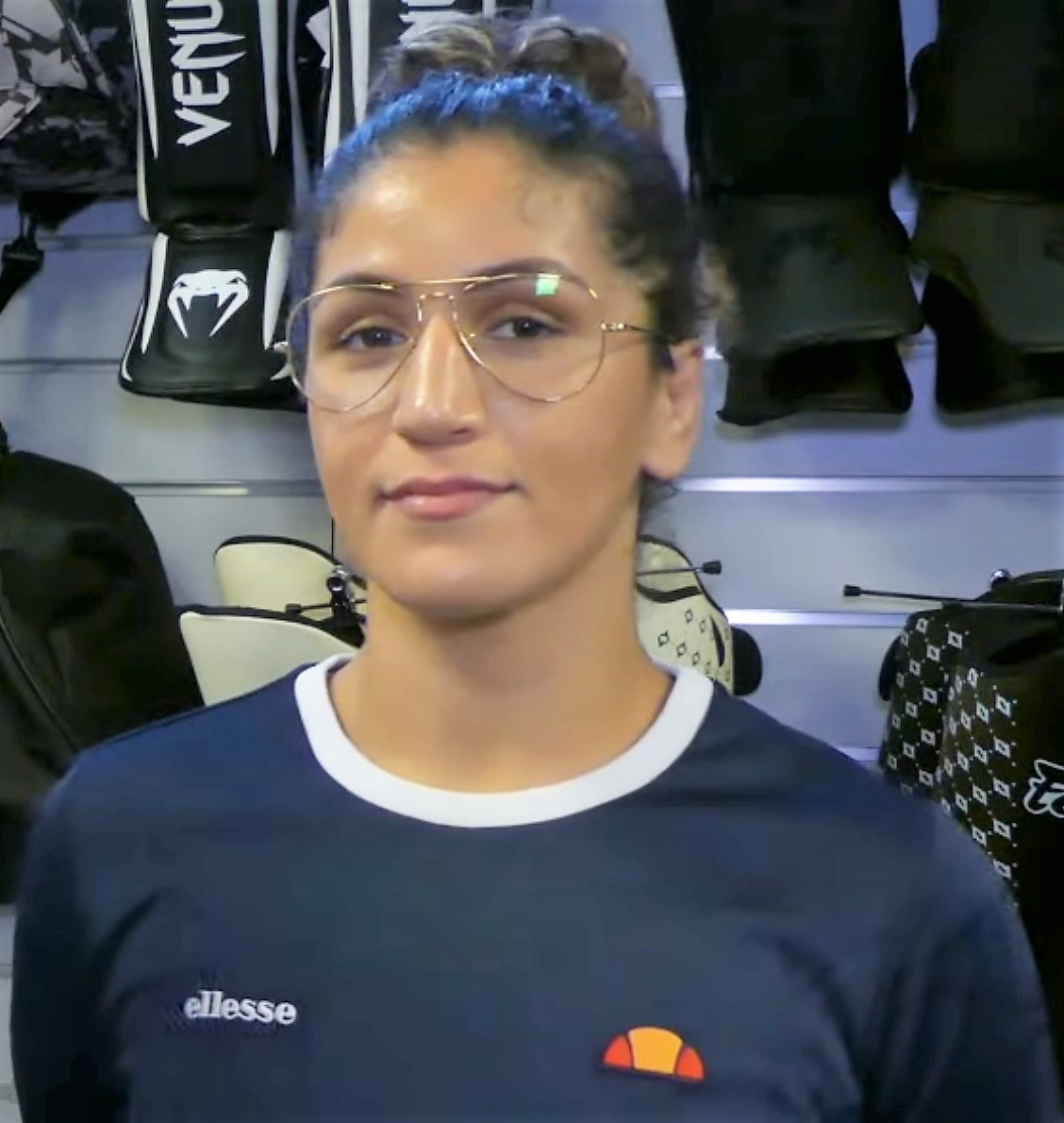
- Kianzad interviewed in 2019
- Born: Pannie Pantea Kianzad; December 8, 1991 (age 34); Ahvaz, Iran
- Other names: Banzai
- Nationality: Swedish
- Height: 5 ft 7 in (1.70 m)
- Weight: 135 lb (61 kg; 9.6 st)
- Division: Featherweight (2012–2014, 2018); Bantamweight (2014–)
- Reach: 68 in (173 cm)
- Style: Boxing, Shootfighting, Submission Wrestling
- Fighting out of: Las Vegas, Nevada, USA
- Team: Xtreme Couture
- Rank: Brown belt in Brazilian Jiu-Jitsu
- Years active: 2012–present

Mixed martial arts record
- Total: 26
- Wins: 16
- By knockout: 3
- By decision: 13
- Losses: 10
- By knockout: 1
- By submission: 4
- By decision: 5

Other information
- Mixed martial arts record from Sherdog
- Last updated on: May 11, 2019

Pannie Pantea Kianzad (born December 8, 1991) is an Iranian-born Swedish mixed martial artist who competed in the Ultimate Fighting Championship in the Women's Bantamweight division, having previously fought in Invicta FC and Cage Warriors where she held the bantamweight title.

== Mixed martial arts career ==
=== Early career ===
Kianzad started her martial arts career in boxing when she was around 14 years old and she went on to compete in around 30 amateur boxing fights. In 2010, she competed in the Swedish National Championships in Shootfighting and came in second place claiming the silver medal after losing to Lina Länsberg in the final. The following year, at 19 years of age, she became Swedish Champion in Shootfighting by defeating Genesini Serena by submission (armbar) in the second round.

After turning professional she beat her swedish rival Lina Länsberg in her third fight, which she won by TKO. She racked up five straight wins in smaller organizations before getting signed to Cage Warriors. During this period she transitioned from team Kaisho in Helsingborg, Sweden, to Rumble Sports in Copenhagen, Denmark. As of 2016 Kianzad trains with Arte Suave team in Copenhagen, Denmark

=== Cage Warriors. ===
In 2014 Kianzad signed with British top promotion Cage Warriors. She made her promotional debut against Megan van Houtum on August 22, 2014, at Cage Warriors 71. She won the fight by TKO in the third round.

Kianzad was expected to face Agnieszka Niedzwiedz for the vacant bantamweight title on November 15, 2014, at Cage Warriors 74, but Niedzwiedz was forced to withdraw from the bout due to an injury and Kianzad's opponent was changed to be Finnish fighter Eeva Siiskonen. After five rounds Kianzad defeated Siiskonen by unanimous decision (50–45, 50–45, 49–46) to become Cage Warriors female bantamweight champion.

=== Invicta Fighting Championship ===
After staying undefeated through her first 7 fights, and claiming the Cage Warriors title, Kianzad got another step up in her career as she got signed by Invicta FC in March, 2015.

She made her promotional debut against Jessica-Rose Clark on July 9, 2015, at Invicta FC 13. Kianzad won the fight by one-sided unanimous decision.

Kianzad was set to face newly crowned champion Tonya Evinger in a title fight on September 14, 2015, at Invicta FC 14. However, Kianzad missed weight for the fight so it was changed to a non-title bout. She lost by TKO in the second round.

She fought Raquel Pa'aluhi on January 14, 2017, at Invicta FC 21. She lost the fight by submission due to a rear-naked choke in the first round.

Kianzad faced Sarah Kaufman on January 13, 2018, at Invicta FC 27. At weight-ins, Kianzad weighted 136.7 Ibs, missing 0.7 Ibs of the upper limit in bantamweight of 136 Ibs. Kianzad was fined twenty five percent of her fight purse for missing weight. She lost the fight via unanimous decision.

Kianzad fought Bianca Daimoni on May 4, 2018, at Invicta FC 29. At weight-ins, Kianzad weighted 134.8 lbs while Daimoni weighted 139.6, missing 3.6 lbs of the upper limit in bantamweight of 136 lbs and the bout proceeded at catchweight. Daimoni was fined twenty five percent of her fight purse for missing weight Kianzad won the fight via unanimous decision.

About a month later she fought Kerry Hughes on June 9, 2018, at Danish MMA Night 1. Kianzad had a dominant performance and won by unanimous decision.

=== The Ultimate Fighter 28 ===
In August 2018 Kianzad's sponsor Combat Dollies revealed that she had been selected as a fighter on The Ultimate Fighter 28, where she would compete at featherweight.

Kianzad was the fourth pick (second among featherweights) by coach Kelvin Gastelum. She fought Katharina Lehner in the quarter-finals of the tournament. She won the fight by unanimous decision.

In the semi-finals of the tournament, Kianzad was paired up against Julija Stoliarenko. She won the fight by unanimous decision, securing a spot in the finals.

=== Ultimate Fighting Championship ===
Kianzad faced Macy Chiasson in the finals on November 30, 2018, at The Ultimate Fighter 28 Finale. She lost the fight via a rear-naked choke submission in round two.

Kianzad did not receive a contract from UFC after her loss at TUF 28 Finale.

=== Post-UFC career ===
In her return to the European scene, Kianzad dropped back down to the bantamweight division and faced Bellator veteran Iony Razafiarison on May 11, 2019, at Super Challenge 19. She won the fight by unanimous decision.

=== Return to Ultimate Fighting Championship ===
Kianzad replaced Melissa Gatto in a short notice bout against Julia Avila on July 6, 2019, at UFC 239. She lost the fight by unanimous decision.

Kianzad faced Jessica-Rose Clark in a re-match on November 9, 2019, at UFC Fight Night 163. She won the fight via unanimous decision.

Kianzad was scheduled to face Bethe Correia on May 9, 2020, at UFC 249. However, on April 9, Dana White, the president of UFC announced that this event was postponed to a future date The bout eventually took place on July 26, 2020, at UFC on ESPN 14. Kianzad won the fight via unanimous decision. Kianzad entered the UFC rankings for the first time in her career after her win over #13 ranked Correia.

Kianzad faced Sijara Eubanks on December 19, 2020, at UFC Fight Night 183. She won the fight via unanimous decision.

Kianzad faced on Alexis Davis June 12, 2021, at UFC 263. She won the fight via unanimous decision.

Kianzad faced Raquel Pennington on September 18, 2021, at UFC Fight Night 192. She lost the fight via unanimous decision.

Kianzad faced Lina Länsberg on April 16, 2022, at UFC on ESPN 34. She won the fight via unanimous decision.

Kianzad faced Ketlen Vieira on July 22, 2023, at UFC on ESPN+ 82. She lost the fight via unanimous decision.

Kianzad faced Macy Chiasson in a rematch on March 16, 2024, at UFC Fight Night 239. She lost the bout by rear-naked choke submission in the first round.

In June 2024, Kianzad was added to EA Sports UFC 5.

Kianzad faced Karol Rosa on August 10, 2024 at UFC on ESPN 61. She lost the fight via unanimous decision.

On August 28, 2024, it was reported that Kianzad was removed from the UFC roster. She was ranked 12th in the UFC women's bantamweight rankings in August 2024 at the time of removal from the UFC roster. Kianzad's highest career UFC ranking was 6th in the women's bantamweight division, achieved on July 4, 2023, while her highest Fight Matrix ranking was 3rd, achieved on July 1, 2021.

=== Global Fight League ===
On December 11, 2024, it was announced that Kianzad had signed with Global Fight League. On January 24, 2025, Kianzad was drafted by Team London in the inaugural edition of Global Fight League. However, in April 2025, it was reported that all GFL events were cancelled indefinitely.

=== Fusion Fight League ===
Kianzad was scheduled to fight Maya Stewart on April 11, 2026 in the Fusion Fight League at Four Seasons Arena in Great Falls, Montana, but the fight was cancelled. Kianzad faced Hope Chase on August 7, 2026 in the Fusion Fight League in Billings, Montana.

== Championships and accomplishments ==
=== Mixed martial arts ===
- Ultimate Fighting Championship
  - First ever Persian female UFC fighter
  - The Ultimate Fighter 28 (Runner-Up)
- Invicta Fighting Championships
  - Performance of the Night (One time) vs. Bianca Daimoni
- Cage Warriors Fighting Championship
  - CWFC Women's Bantamweight Championship (One time)
  - Undefeated in the CWFC (2-0)
- Nordic MMA Awards - MMAViking.com
  - 2013 Female Fighter of the Year
  - 2018 Female Fighter of the Year
  - 2020 Female Fighter of the Year

=== Shootfighting ===
- Swedish Shootfighting League
  - 2010 National Women's Featherweight Shootfighting Championship (silver)
  - 2011 National Women's Featherweight Shootfighting Championship (gold)

== Mixed martial arts record ==
Professional record breakdown
26 matches	16 wins	10 losses
By knockout	3	1
By submission	0	4
By decision	13	5

Res.	Record	Opponent	Method	Event	Date	Round	Time	Location	Notes
Loss	16–10	Hope Chase	Submission (armbar)	Fusion Fight League: Fights Under the Lights	August 7, 2026	1	2:49	Billings, Montana, United States	
Loss	16–9	Karol Rosa	Decision (unanimous)	UFC on ESPN: Tybura vs. Spivac 2	August 10, 2024	3	5:00	Las Vegas, Nevada, United States	
Loss	16–8	Macy Chiasson	Submission (rear-naked choke)	UFC Fight Night: Tuivasa vs. Tybura	March 16, 2024	1	3:54	Las Vegas, Nevada, United States	
Loss	16–7	Ketlen Vieira	Decision (unanimous)	UFC Fight Night: Aspinall vs. Tybura	July 22, 2023	3	5:00	London, England	
Win	16–6	Lina Länsberg	Decision (unanimous)	UFC on ESPN: Luque vs. Muhammad 2	April 16, 2022	3	5:00	Las Vegas, Nevada, United States	
Loss	15–6	Raquel Pennington	Decision (unanimous)	UFC Fight Night: Smith vs. Spann	September 18, 2021	3	5:00	Las Vegas, Nevada, United States	
Win	15–5	Alexis Davis	Decision (unanimous)	UFC 263	June 12, 2021	3	5:00	Glendale, Arizona, United States	
Win	14–5	Sijara Eubanks	Decision (unanimous)	UFC Fight Night: Thompson vs. Neal	December 19, 2020	3	5:00	Las Vegas, Nevada, United States	
Win	13–5	Bethe Correia	Decision (unanimous)	UFC on ESPN: Whittaker vs. Till	July 26, 2020	3	5:00	Abu Dhabi, United Arab Emirates	
Win	12–5	Jessica-Rose Clark	Decision (unanimous)	UFC Fight Night: Magomedsharipov vs. Kattar	November 9, 2019	3	5:00	Moscow, Russia	
Loss	11–5	Julia Avila	Decision (unanimous)	UFC 239	July 6, 2019	3	5:00	Las Vegas, Nevada, United States	
Win	11–4	Iony Razafiarison	Decision (unanimous)	Superior Challenge 19	May 11, 2019	3	5:00	Stockholm, Sweden	Return to Bantamweight.
Loss	10–4	Macy Chiasson	Submission (rear-naked choke)	The Ultimate Fighter: Heavy Hitters Finale	November 30, 2018	2	2:11	Las Vegas, Nevada, United States	The Ultimate Fighter 28 Women's Featherweight Tournament Final.
Win	10–3	Kerry Hughes	Decision (unanimous)	Danish MMA Night: Vol. 1	June 9, 2018	3	5:00	Brøndby, Denmark	
Win	9–3	Bianca Daimoni	Decision (unanimous)	Invicta FC 29: Kaufman vs. Lehner	May 4, 2018	3	5:00	Kansas City, Missouri, United States	Catchweight (139.6 lb) bout; Daimoni missed weight. Performance of the Night.
Loss	8–3	Sarah Kaufman	Decision (unanimous)	Invicta FC 27: Kaufman vs. Kianzad	January 13, 2018	3	5:00	Kansas City, Missouri, United States	Catchweight (136.7 lb) bout; Kianzad missed weight.
Loss	8–2	Raquel Pa'aluhi	Submission (rear-naked choke)	Invicta FC 21: Anderson vs. Tweet	January 14, 2017	1	3:40	Kansas City, Missouri, United States	
Loss	8–1	Tonya Evinger	TKO (punches)	Invicta FC 14: Evinger vs. Kianzad	September 12, 2015	2	3:34	Kansas City, Kansas, United States	Non-title bout; Kianzad missed weight (136.7 lb).
Win	8–0	Jessica-Rose Clark	Decision (unanimous)	Invicta FC 13: Cyborg vs. Van Duin	July 9, 2015	3	5:00	Las Vegas, Nevada, United States	
Win	7–0	Eeva Siiskonen	Decision (unanimous)	Cage Warriors FC 74	November 15, 2014	5	5:00	London, England	Bantamweight debut. Won the vacant Cage Warriors Women's Bantamweight Championship.
Win	6–0	Megan van Houtum	TKO (punches)	Cage Warriors FC 71	August 22, 2014	3	2:17	Amman, Jordan	Catchweight (140 lb) bout.
Win	5–0	Annalisa Bucci	Decision (unanimous)	Superior Challenge 10	May 3, 2014	3	5:00	Helsingborg, Sweden	
Win	4–0	Milana Dudieva	Decision (unanimous)	ProFC 50	October 16, 2013	3	5:00	Rostov-on-Don, Russia	Catchweight (140 lb) bout.
Win	3–0	Lina Länsberg	TKO (punches)	Trophy MMA 1	December 29, 2012	3	4:44	Malmö, Sweden	
Win	2–0	Cheryl Flynn	TKO (punches)	Vision FC 5: Finale	December 1, 2012	1	2:50	Stockholm, Sweden	
Win	1–0	Helin Paara	Decision (unanimous)	MMA Raju 9	April 14, 2012	3	4:00	Tallinn, Estonia	Featherweight debut.

Exhibition record breakdown		
2 matches	2 wins	0 losses
By decision	2	0

Res.	Record	Opponent	Method	Event	Date	Round	Time	Location	Notes
Win	2–0	Julija Stoliarenko	Decision (unanimous)	The Ultimate Fighter: Heavy Hitters	November 14, 2018 (airdate)	3	5:00	Las Vegas, Nevada, United States	TUF 28 Semi-final.
Win	1–0	Katharina Lehner	Decision (unanimous)	The Ultimate Fighter: Heavy Hitters	September 5, 2018 (airdate)	2	5:00	Las Vegas, Nevada, United States	TUF 28 Quarter-final.

== See also ==
- List of current GFL fighters
- List of female mixed martial artists
