= Bea Malecki =

Swedish mixed martial arts fighter

- Born: August 23, 1991 (age 35); Stockholm, Sweden
- Nationality: Swedish
- Height: 5 ft 9 in (1.75 m)
- Weight: 135 lb (61 kg; 9 st 9 lb)
- Division: Bantamweight
- Reach: 74 in (188 cm)
- Style: Muay Thai
- Team: Allstars Training Center; SikJitsu; Fortis MMA
- Years active: 2017–present

Mixed martial arts record
- Total: 5
- Wins: 4
- By knockout: 1
- By submission: 2
- By decision: 1
- Losses: 1
- By knockout: 1

Other information
- Mixed martial arts record from Sherdog

Bea Malecki (born August 23, 1991) is a Swedish mixed martial artist who competes in the Bantamweight division. A professional since 2017, she is most notable for her time in the Ultimate Fighting Championship (UFC).

== Background ==
Malecki's parents came to Sweden when they were about 30 years old, with Malecki speaking Polish at home. Bea Malecki was 19 years old when she tested martial arts for the first time. As a Thai boxer, she won the Swedish Championships, the European Championships and the World Cup.

Outside of MMA, Malecki is a Mechanical Engineer, getting her degree from the Royal Institute of Technology in Stockholm, Sweden.

== Mixed martial arts career ==
=== Early career ===
Malecki made her amateur debut against Helin Paara at International Ring Fight Arena 12. She won the fight by a second-round technical knockout.

Malecki made her professional debut against Faith Davis, for the inaugural for the ExciteFight MMA Featherweight title, at ExciteFight Conquest of the Cage on November 4, 2017. Malecki won the fight by a first-round submission.

Malecki was scheduled to fight the debuting Tracy Smith at Conquest of the Cage on February 2, 2018. Malecki won the fight by a technical knockout, stopping her opponent after just 22 seconds.

On July 11, 2018, it was revealed that Malecki would be one of the fighters featured on The Ultimate Fighter: Heavy Hitters. She was the sixth pick for Team Gastelum. Malecki lost the quarterfinal bout against Leah Letson by unanimous decision.

=== Ultimate Fighting Championship ===
Malecki made her promotional debut against Duda Santana at UFC Fight Night: Gustafsson vs. Smith on June 1, 2019. She won the fight via second-round submission. Following this loss, Duda tested positive for ligandrol in an out-of-competition test.

She made her second appearance in the organization against Veronica Macedo at UFC Fight Night: Lee vs. Oliveira on March 14, 2020. She won the fight via unanimous decision.

Malecki was expected to face Tracy Cortez at UFC Fight Night 179 on October 11, 2020. However, Malecki withdrew from the bout and was replaced by Stephanie Egger.

Malecki was then scheduled to face Norma Dumont at UFC on ABC 2 on April 10, 2021. However, she withdrew from the bout due to a undisclosed reason and was replaced by Erin Blanchfield.

Malecki faced Josiane Nunes at UFC on ESPN: Cannonier vs. Gastelum on August 21, 2021. She lost the fight via knockout in round one.

On June 8, 2023, it was announced that Malecki was no longer on the UFC roster after she indicated she wanted to move up in weight but UFC conveyed they were no longer interested in having a Women's Featherweight division.

== Championships and accomplishments ==
=== Muay Thai ===
- 2016: Muay Thai Boxing World Cup - 1st place in the -67 kg category (Jönköping)

== Mixed martial arts record ==
Professional record breakdown
5 matches	4 wins	1 loss
By knockout	1	1
By submission	2	0
By decision	1	0

Res.	Record	Opponent	Method	Event	Date	Round	Time	Location	Notes
Loss	4–1	Josiane Nunes	KO (punch)	UFC on ESPN: Cannonier vs. Gastelum	August 21, 2021	1	4:54	Las Vegas, Nevada, United States	
Win	4–0	Veronica Macedo	Decision (unanimous)	UFC Fight Night: Lee vs. Oliveira	March 14, 2020	3	5:00	Brasília, Brazil	
Win	3–0	Duda Santana	Submission (rear-naked choke)	UFC Fight Night: Gustafsson vs. Smith	June 1, 2019	2	1:59	Stockholm, Sweden	Bantamweight debut.
Win	2–0	Tracy Smith	TKO (punches)	Conquest of the Cage	February 2, 2018	1	0:22	Airway Heights, Washington, United States	
Win	1–0	Faith Davis	Technical Submission (rear-naked choke)	ExciteFight Conquest of the Cage	November 4, 2017	1	2:59	Airway Heights, Washington, United States	Won the ExciteFight MMA Lightweight Championship.

=== Amateur mixed martial arts record ===
Amateur record breakdown		
1 match	1 win	0 losses
By knockout	1	0

Res.	Record	Opponent	Method	Event	Date	Round	Time	Location	Notes
Win	1–0	Helin Paara	TKO	International Ring Fight Arena 12	May 6, 2017	2	N/A	Stockholm, Sweden	

== See also ==
- List of female mixed martial artists
