= UFC Fight Night: Font vs. Garbrandt =

Mixed martial arts event in 2021

- The poster for UFC Fight Night: Font vs. Garbrandt
- Promotion: Ultimate Fighting Championship
- Date: May 22, 2021
- Venue: UFC Apex
- City: Enterprise, Nevada, United States
- Attendance: None (behind closed doors)

Event chronology
UFC 262: Oliveira vs. Chandler	UFC Fight Night: Font vs. Garbrandt	UFC Fight Night: Rozenstruik vs. Sakai

UFC Fight Night: Font vs. Garbrandt (also known as UFC Fight Night 188, UFC on ESPN+ 46 and UFC Vegas 27) was a mixed martial arts event produced by the Ultimate Fighting Championship that took place on May 22, 2021, at the UFC Apex facility in Enterprise, Nevada, part of the Las Vegas Metropolitan Area, United States.

== Background ==
A bantamweight bout between former UFC Bantamweight Champion Cody Garbrandt and Rob Font served as the main event.

Ricardo Ramos and Bill Algeo were originally scheduled to meet in a bantamweight bout five weeks earlier at UFC on ESPN: Whittaker vs. Gastelum, but Ramos was pulled from the fight during the week leading up to the event after he tested positive for COVID-19. The pairing was left intact and took place at this event.

Denys Bondar was expected to face Victor Rodriguez in a flyweight bout at the event. However, Bondar was forced to pull out in late April due to an injury and was replaced by Bruno Gustavo da Silva.

Promotional newcomer Danyelle Wolf was expected to face former Invicta FC Featherweight Champion and UFC Women's Featherweight Championship challenger Felicia Spencer in a women's featherweight bout at the event. However, Wolf pulled out of the fight in early May due to an undisclosed injury and was replaced by Norma Dumont.

A heavyweight bout between Rodrigo Nascimento and Alan Baudot was originally expected to take place at this event. However, they were rescheduled for UFC on ESPN: Makhachev vs. Moisés after Baudot got injured.

A middleweight bout between Jack Hermansson and Edmen Shahbazyan was originally expected to take place one week prior at UFC 262. However, the bout was postponed due to a COVID-19 case in Hermansson's camp and took place at this event instead.

Ben Rothwell and Philipe Lins were scheduled to meet in a heavyweight bout in March at UFC Fight Night: Edwards vs. Muhammad, but it was cancelled due to an injury to Rothwell. They were then rescheduled for UFC on ESPN: Rodriguez vs. Waterson, but the bout fell through once again as Lins got ill a day before their fight. They were then expected to compete at this event. However, yet again, Lins was pulled from the event for undisclosed reasons and briefly replaced by promotional newcomer Askar Mozharov. Just hours later, the Ukrainian subsequently announced that he would not be able to get a visa in time for the event. He was eventually replaced by fellow newcomer Chris Barnett.

A women's bantamweight bout between Stephanie Egger and Sarah Alpar was expected to serve as the card's first bout. However, Egger pulled out due to undisclosed reasons in the week leading up to the event and was replaced by Lupita Godinez. The bout was scrapped completely a day later as Godinez wasn't able to get her visa in time.

A flyweight bout between Raulian Paiva and David Dvořák was scheduled to take place at the event. However, Paiva pulled out of the fight on the day before the event due to ill effects related to his weight cut. He was replaced by promotional newcomer Juancamilo Ronderos. At the weigh-ins, Ronderos weighed in at 128.5 pounds, two and a half pounds over the division's non-title fight limit. The bout proceeded at catchweight and he was fined 20% of his purse, which went to Dvořák.

A lightweight bout between Yancy Medeiros and Damir Hadžović was scheduled for the event. However, it was pulled from the card just hours before taking place due to health issues with Hadžović.

UFC lightweight contender and color commentator Paul Felder, who was doing commentary for this event, announced his retirement from MMA during the live broadcast.

== Results ==
Main card (ESPN+)
Weight class				Method	Round	Time	Notes
Bantamweight	Rob Font	def.	Cody Garbrandt	Decision (unanimous) (48–47, 50–45, 50–45)	5	5:00
Women's Strawweight	Carla Esparza	def.	Yan Xiaonan	TKO (punches)	2	2:58
Heavyweight	Jared Vanderaa	def.	Justin Tafa	Decision (unanimous) (30–27, 30–27, 29–28)	3	5:00
Women's Featherweight	Norma Dumont	def.	Felicia Spencer	Decision (split) (30–27, 28–29, 29–28)	3	5:00
Featherweight	Ricardo Ramos	def.	Bill Algeo	Decision (unanimous) (30–27, 30–27, 29–28)	3	5:00
Middleweight	Jack Hermansson	def.	Edmen Shahbazyan	Decision (unanimous) (29–27, 29–27, 29–27)	3	5:00
Preliminary card (ESPN+)
Heavyweight	Ben Rothwell	def.	Chris Barnett	Submission (guillotine choke)	2	2:07
Welterweight	Court McGee	def.	Cláudio Silva	Decision (unanimous) (30–26, 30–26, 29–27)	3	5:00
Flyweight	Bruno Gustavo da Silva	def.	Victor Rodriguez	KO (punches)	1	1:00
Featherweight	Joshua Culibao	def.	Shayilan Nuerdanbieke	Decision (unanimous) (29–28, 29–28, 29–28)	3	5:00
Catchweight (128.5 lb)	David Dvořák	def.	Juancamilo Ronderos	Submission (rear-naked choke)	1	2:18
Lightweight	Damir Ismagulov	def.	Rafael Alves	Decision (unanimous) (29–28, 29–28, 29–28)	3	5:00

== Bonus awards ==
The following fighters received $50,000 bonuses.

- Fight of the Night: Jared Vanderaa vs. Justin Tafa
- Performance of the Night: Carla Esparza and Bruno Gustavo da Silva

== See also ==
- List of UFC events
- List of current UFC fighters
- 2021 in UFC
