= Norma Dumont =

Brazilian mixed martial artist (born 1990)

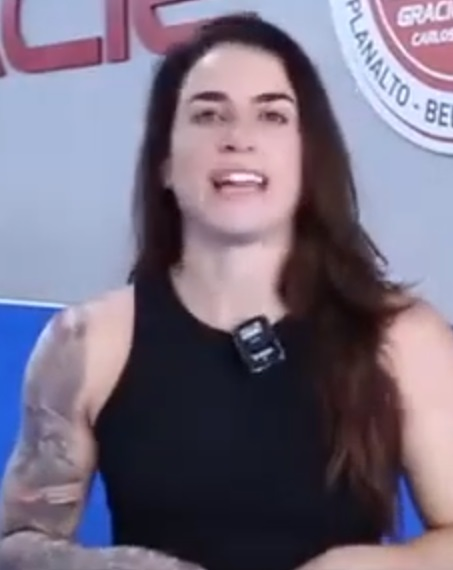
- Dumont in 2024
- Born: Norma Dumont Viana Ferreira; October 1, 1990 (age 36); Belo Horizonte, Minas Gerais, Brazil
- Other names: The Immortal
- Height: 5 ft 7 in (1.70 m)
- Weight: 145 lb (66 kg; 10.4 st)
- Division: Featherweight; Bantamweight
- Reach: 67 in (170 cm)
- Style: Sanda
- Fighting out of: Belo Horizonte, Brazil
- Team: Gordin Fight Team (until 2021); Syndicate MMA (2021–present)
- Rank: Brown belt in Brazilian Jiu-Jitsu; Black belt in Sanda
- Years active: 2016–present

Mixed martial arts record
- Total: 17
- Wins: 13
- By submission: 2
- By decision: 11
- Losses: 4
- By knockout: 1
- By decision: 3

Other information
- Mixed martial arts record from Sherdog

Norma Dumont Viana Ferreira (born October 1, 1990) is a Brazilian professional mixed martial artist. She competed in the women's Bantamweight division of the Ultimate Fighting Championship (UFC). As of October 31, 2026, she is #4 in the Meta UFC women's bantamweight rankings.

== Background ==
Dumont's father abandoned her mother and his three daughters when Dumont was four. At 13, Dumont started practicing Jiu Jitsu. She stopped training to begin work as a secretary. At 19 years old, she went back to training and continued with her MMA career. During this time, she became a six-time Sanda State champion and National champion of Sanda.

When Dumont returned to training at 19, she found a free Muay Thai class. She was suggested by a friend to try Sanda and upon seeing it for the first time signed up immediately.

== Mixed martial arts career ==
=== Early career ===
Starting her career in 2016, Dumont compiled a perfect 4–0 record on the regional Brazilian scene, winning two of those bouts via first round submission.

=== Ultimate Fighting Championship ===
Dumont made her promotional debut on February 29, 2020, at UFC Fight Night 169 against Megan Anderson. She lost the fight via knockout in round one.

She made her sophomore appearance in the organization against Ashlee Evans-Smith on November 28, 2020, at UFC on ESPN 18. At the weigh-ins, Norma Dumont weighed in at 139.5 pounds, three and a half pounds over the women's bantamweight non-title fight limit. Her bout proceeded at catchweight and she was fined 30% of her individual purse, which went to her opponent. She won the fight via unanimous decision.

Dumont was expected to face Bea Malecki at UFC on ABC 2 on April 10, 2021. However, Malecki pulled out a week before the contest due to undisclosed reasons and was replaced by promotional newcomer Erin Blanchfield. In turn, the bout was pulled from the card by after Dumont missed weight by 3.5lbs.

Dumont, as a replacement for Danyelle Wolf, faced Felicia Spencer on May 22, 2021, at UFC Fight Night 188. She won the bout via split decision.

Dumont was scheduled to face Holly Holm on October 16, 2021, at UFC Fight Night 195. However, on October 6, 2021, it was reported that Holm was forced to withdraw from the event, citing injury, and was replaced by Aspen Ladd. Dumont was not concerned with the short notice nature of the fight saying, "I've been training five rounds and doing 25 minutes straight. That's nothing new to me." Dumont won the fight via unanimous decision.

Dumont faced Macy Chiasson on May 7, 2022, at UFC 274. At the weigh-ins, Dumont weighed in at 146.5 pounds, half a pound over the women's featherweight non-title fight limit. The bout proceeded at catchweight, with Dumont forfeiting 30% of her purse to Chiasson. Dumont lost the fight via split decision.

Dumont faced promotional newcomer Danyelle Wolf on September 10, 2022, at UFC 279. She won the fight via unanimous decision.

Dumont faced Karol Rosa April 22, 2023, at UFC Fight Night 222. She won the fight via unanimous decision.

Dumont faced Chelsea Chandler on July 15, 2023, at UFC Fight Night 224. She won the fight by unanimous decision.

Dumont was scheduled Yana Santos on January 13, 2024, at UFC Fight Night 234. However, Santos pulled out due to a broken nose and the bout was cancelled.

Dumont faced Germaine de Randamie on April 6, 2024, at UFC Fight Night 240. She won the bout again by unanimous decision.

Dumont faced Irene Aldana on September 14, 2024, at UFC 306. She won the fight by unanimous decision.

Dumont was scheduled to face former UFC Women's Bantamweight Champion Raquel Pennington on September 13, 2025, at UFC Fight Night 259. However, Pennington had to withdraw due to an undisclosed injury, so the bout was removed from the card.

Shortly after the cancellation of her previous bout, it was announced that Dumont would face Ketlen Vieira on November 1, 2025 at UFC Fight Night 263. Dumont won the fight by split decision. 6 out of 7 media outlets scored the bout for Vieira.

Dumont was scheduled to face Yana Santos on April 25, 2026 at UFC Fight Night 274. However, for undisclosed reasons, Santos withdrew and was replaced by Joselyne Edwards. She lost the fight via unanimous decision.

Dumont faced Ailín Pérez on September 26, 2026 at UFC Fight Night 289. She lost the fight by unanimous decision, but not without security intervening when a confrontation between both fighters ensued right after the final round and once more after being taunted by Pérez after the official decision.

On November 10, 2026, Dumont announced that she was released by the UFC, despite having two fights left on her contract.

== Championships and accomplishments ==
=== Mixed Martial arts ===
- Ultimate Fighting Championship
  - Most wins in UFC Women's Featherweight division history (5)
  - Tied (Megan Anderson & Felicia Spencer) for most bouts in UFC Women's Featherweight division history (6)
  - Most unanimous decision wins in UFC Women's Featherweight division history (4)
  - Most decision bouts in UFC Women's Featherweight division history (5)
  - Most total fight time in UFC Women's Featherweight division history (1:31:26)
  - Most takedowns landed in UFC Women's Featherweight division history (9)
  - Longest winning streak in UFC Women's Featherweight division history (5)
  - UFC.com Awards
    - 2021: Ranked #10 Upset of the Year vs. Aspen Ladd

== Mixed martial arts record ==
Professional record breakdown
17 matches	13 wins	4 losses
By knockout	0	1
By submission	2	0
By decision	11	3

Res.	Record	Opponent	Method	Event	Date	Round	Time	Location	Notes
Loss	13–4	Ailín Pérez	Decision (unanimous)	UFC Fight Night: Rosas Jr. vs. Barcelos	26 September 2026	3	5:00	Las Vegas, Nevada, United States	
Loss	13–3	Joselyne Edwards	Decision (unanimous)	UFC Fight Night: Sterling vs. Zalal	25 April 2026	3	5:00	Las Vegas, Nevada, United States	
Win	13–2	Ketlen Vieira	Decision (split)	UFC Fight Night: Garcia vs. Onama	1 November 2025	3	5:00	Las Vegas, Nevada, United States	
Win	12–2	Irene Aldana	Decision (unanimous)	UFC 306	14 September 2024	3	5:00	Las Vegas, Nevada, United States	
Win	11–2	Germaine de Randamie	Decision (unanimous)	UFC Fight Night: Allen vs. Curtis 2	6 April 2024	3	5:00	Las Vegas, Nevada, United States	Return to Bantamweight.
Win	10–2	Chelsea Chandler	Decision (unanimous)	UFC on ESPN: Holm vs. Bueno Silva	15 July 2023	3	5:00	Las Vegas, Nevada, United States	
Win	9–2	Karol Rosa	Decision (unanimous)	UFC Fight Night: Pavlovich vs. Blaydes	22 April 2023	3	5:00	Las Vegas, Nevada, United States	
Win	8–2	Danyelle Wolf	Decision (unanimous)	UFC 279	10 September 2022	3	5:00	Las Vegas, Nevada, United States	
Loss	7–2	Macy Chiasson	Decision (split)	UFC 274	7 May 2022	3	5:00	Phoenix, Arizona, United States	Catchweight (146.5 lb) bout; Dumont missed weight.
Win	7–1	Aspen Ladd	Decision (unanimous)	UFC Fight Night: Ladd vs. Dumont	16 October 2021	5	5:00	Las Vegas, Nevada, United States	
Win	6–1	Felicia Spencer	Decision (split)	UFC Fight Night: Font vs. Garbrandt	22 May 2021	3	5:00	Las Vegas, Nevada, United States	
Win	5–1	Ashlee Evans-Smith	Decision (unanimous)	UFC on ESPN: Smith vs. Clark	28 November 2020	3	5:00	Las Vegas, Nevada, United States	Bantamweight bout; Dumont missed weight (139.5 lb).
Loss	4–1	Megan Anderson	KO (punch)	UFC Fight Night: Benavidez vs. Figueiredo	29 February 2020	1	3:31	Norfolk, Virginia, United States	Featherweight debut.
Win	4–0	Mariana Morais	Decision (majority)	Shooto Brazil 86	5 August 2018	3	5:00	Rio de Janeiro, Brazil	
Win	3–0	Erica Leidianny Ribeiro	Submission (rear-naked choke)	Federação Fight 5	16 September 2017	1	3:43	Belo Horizonte, Brazil	Catchweight (141 lb) bout.
Win	2–0	Patricia Borges Fernandes	Decision (unanimous)	Jungle Fight 91	15 July 2017	3	5:00	Contagem, Brazil	
Win	1–0	Tainara Lisboa	Submission (rear-naked choke)	Jungle Fight 90	3 September 2016	1	2:58	São Paulo, Brazil	Bantamweight debut.

== See also ==
- List of female mixed martial artists
