= UFC Fight Night: Benavidez vs. Figueiredo =

UFC mixed martial arts event in 2020

- The poster for UFC Fight Night: Benavidez vs. Figueiredo
- Promotion: Ultimate Fighting Championship
- Date: February 29, 2020
- Venue: Chartway Arena
- City: Norfolk, Virginia, United States
- Attendance: 7,098
- Total gate: $402,958

Event chronology
UFC Fight Night: Felder vs. Hooker	UFC Fight Night: Benavidez vs. Figueiredo	UFC 248: Adesanya vs. Romero

UFC Fight Night: Benavidez vs. Figueiredo (also known as UFC Fight Night 169 and UFC on ESPN+ 27) was a mixed martial arts event produced by the Ultimate Fighting Championship that took place on February 29, 2020 at Chartway Arena in Norfolk, Virginia, United States.

== Background ==
The event was the second that the promotion has hosted in Norfolk and first since UFC Fight Night: Poirier vs. Pettis in November 2017.

A UFC Flyweight Championship bout for the vacant title between former title challenger Joseph Benavidez and Deiveson Figueiredo served as the event headliner. Multi-divisional champion Henry Cejudo announced on December 19, 2019 that he would be relinquishing the flyweight title and concentrate on competing solely in the bantamweight division.

A welterweight bout between Alex Oliveira and Mickey Gall was scheduled for the event. However, the bout was pulled from the event on December 27 due to undisclosed reasons.

A featherweight bout between Chas Skelly and Grant Dawson was scheduled to take place at UFC 246, but Dawson was forced to withdraw from the bout. The pairing was then rescheduled for this event. In turn, it was reported on February 7 that Skelly was injured during one of his training sessions and therefore forced to withdraw from the fight. He was replaced by promotional newcomer Darrick Minner.

A featherweight bout between Steven Peterson and Aalon Cruz was scheduled to take place at the event. However, Peterson was pulled from the event for an unknown reason and replaced by promotional newcomer Spike Carlyle.

A featherweight bout between Mike Davis and Giga Chikadze expected to take place at this event was cancelled after Davis pulled out due to an undisclosed injury. In turn, promotion officials elected to remove Chikadze from the card due to being unable to find a replacement and scheduled him to face Jamall Emmers at UFC 248, replacing an injured Movsar Evloev.

A lightweight bout between Luis Peña and Alexander Muñoz was scheduled to take place at the event. However, it was announced on February 23 that Muñoz had pulled out due to injury. He was replaced by Steve Garcia.

At the weigh-ins, Figueiredo came in at 127.5 pounds, 2.5 pounds over the flyweight title fight limit of 125 pounds. As a result, he was ineligible to win the championship, while Benavidez remained eligible if he won. Figueiredo was fined 30% of his purse, which went to Benavidez and the bout proceeded as scheduled at a catchweight. Dawson also failed to make weight, coming in at 149.5 pounds, 3.5 pounds over the featherweight non-title fight limit of 146 pounds. He was also fined 30% of his fight purse, which went to Minner and the bout proceeded at a catchweight.

== Results ==
Main card (ESPN+)
Weight class				Method	Round	Time	Notes
Catchweight (127.5 lb)	Deiveson Figueiredo	def.	Joseph Benavidez	TKO (punches)	2	1:54	(Note: For the vacant UFC Flyweight Championship (only Benavidez was eligible).)
Women's Featherweight	Felicia Spencer	def.	Zarah Fairn	TKO (elbows and punches)	1	3:37
Light Heavyweight	Magomed Ankalaev	def.	Ion Cuțelaba	TKO (head kicks and punches)	1	0:38
Women's Featherweight	Megan Anderson	def.	Norma Dumont	KO (punch)	1	3:31
Catchweight (149.5 lb)	Grant Dawson	def.	Darrick Minner	Submission (rear-naked choke)	2	1:38
Preliminary card (ESPN+)
Bantamweight	Kyler Phillips	def.	Gabriel Silva	Decision (unanimous) (30–27, 30–27, 30–27)	3	5:00
Middleweight	Brendan Allen	def.	Tom Breese	TKO (elbows and punches)	1	4:47
Heavyweight	Marcin Tybura	def.	Serghei Spivac	Decision (unanimous) (30–27, 30–27, 29–28)	3	5:00
Lightweight	Luis Peña	def.	Steve Garcia	Decision (unanimous) (30–27, 30–27, 30–27)	3	5:00
Featherweight	Jordan Griffin	def.	T.J. Brown	Technical Submission (guillotine choke)	2	3:38
Featherweight	Spike Carlyle	def.	Aalon Cruz	TKO (punches)	1	1:25
Welterweight	Sean Brady	def.	Ismail Naurdiev	Decision (unanimous) (29–28, 29–28, 30–27)	3	5:00

== Bonus awards ==
The following fighters received $50,000 bonuses.

- Fight of the Night: Kyler Phillips vs. Gabriel Silva
- Performance of the Night: Megan Anderson and Jordan Griffin

== Reported payout ==
The following is the reported payout to the fighters as reported to the Virginia Department of Professional & Occupational Regulation (VDPOR). It does not include sponsor money or "locker room" bonuses often given by the UFC and also do not include the UFC's traditional "fight night" bonuses. The total disclosed payout for the event was $945,000.

- Deiveson Figueiredo: $105,000 ($50,000 win bonus) def. Joseph Benavidez: $195,000 ^
- Felicia Spencer: $34,000 ($17,000 win bonus) def. Zarah Fairn: $10,000
- Magomed Ankalaev: $66,000 ($33,000 win bonus) def. Ion Cuțelaba: $33,000
- Megan Anderson: $80,000 ($40,000 win bonus) def. Norma Dumont Viana: $10,000
- Grant Dawson: $23,800 ($14,000 win bonus) def. Darrick Minner: $14,200 >
- Kyler Phillips: $20,000 ($10,000 win bonus) def. Gabriel Silva: $10,000
- Brendan Allen: $24,000 ($12,000 win bonus) def. Tom Breese: $10,000
- Marcin Tybura: $136,000 ($68,000 win bonus) def. Sergey Spivak: $14,000
- Luis Peña: $48,000 ($24,000 win bonus) def. Steve Garcia: $10,000
- Jordan Griffin: $24,000 ($12,000 win bonus) def. T.J. Brown: $10,000
- Spike Carlyle: $20,000 ($10,000 win bonus) def. Aalon Cruz: $10,000
- Sean Brady: $24,000 ($12,000 win bonus) def. Ismail Naurdiev: $16,000

^ Deiveson Figueiredo ($45,000) was fined 30% of his respective purse for failing to make the required weight for his fight against Joseph Benavidez. That money was issued to Benavidez, a VDPOR official confirmed.

> Although not recognized on the official pay sheet, Grant Dawson ($4,200) was fined 30% of his purse for failing to make the required weight for his fight against Darrick Minner. That money was issued to Minner, a VDPOR official confirmed. The VDPOR's initial report did not include information on the penalty.

== See also ==
- List of UFC events
- List of current UFC fighters
- 2020 in UFC
