= Felicia Spencer =

Canadian mixed martial arts (MMA) fighter

- Born: November 29, 1990 (age 35); Montreal, Quebec, Canada
- Other names: Feenom
- Height: 5 ft 6 in (168 cm)
- Weight: 145 lb (66 kg; 10 st 5 lb)
- Division: Featherweight (145 lb); Lightweight (155 lb)
- Reach: 68 in (173 cm)
- Style: BJJ, Kickboxing, Taekwondo
- Fighting out of: Orlando, Florida, United States
- Team: Jungle MMA
- Trainer: Mike Lee - Head Coach
- Rank: Black belt in Taekwondo; Black belt in Brazilian Jiu-Jitsu
- Years active: 2012–2021

Mixed martial arts record
- Total: 12
- Wins: 9
- By knockout: 3
- By submission: 4
- By decision: 2
- Losses: 3
- By decision: 3

Other information
- Occupation: Mixed Martial Artist, High School math teacher at Florida Virtual School
- University: University of Central Florida
- Mixed martial arts record from Sherdog

Felicia Spencer (born November 29, 1990) is a Canadian former mixed martial artist. She is the former Invicta FC Featherweight champion and formerly competed in the Featherweight division of the Ultimate Fighting Championship.

== Background ==
Spencer was born in Montreal, Quebec, and she moved to Englewood, Florida, with her family as a child, where she later graduated from Lemon Bay High School. Joining her older brothers, Spencer started training in Taekwondo at the age of four. At twelve years old, she started training in Brazilian jiu-jitsu and added kickboxing to her training five years later. She transitioned to train in MMA when she joined Jungle MMA in 2009, when she moved to Orlando to attend the University of Central Florida.

== Mixed martial arts career ==
=== Early career ===
Spencer started her amateur career in 2012. After winning the first "Tuff-N-Uff Future Stars of MMA" tournament where she submitted Leanne Foster and knocked out Jessica Eve Richer at the second "Tuff-N-Uff Xtreme", amassing a record of 5–1, Invicta FC signed her in 2015.

=== Invicta Fighting Championships ===
Spencer made her promotional debut on September 12, 2015, at Invicta FC 14: Evinger vs. Kianzad against Rachel Wiley. She won the fight via a technical knock out in round one.

Her next fight came over eighteen months later on March 25, 2017, at Invicta FC 22: Evinger vs. Kunitskaya 2. She faced Madison McElhaney in a Featherweight bout and she won the fight via unanimous decision with the scoreboard of (30–27, 30–27, and 29–28).

On July 15, 2017, Spencer faced Amy Coleman at Invicta FC 24: Dudieva vs. Borella. She won the fight via a rear-naked choke in round one. The submission earned her the Performance of the Night bonus.

Spencer faced Akeel Al-Hameed on January 13, 2018, at Invicta FC 27: Kaufman vs. Kianzad. She won the fight via unanimous decision (30–27, 30–27, and 30–27). The bout earned both fighters the Fight of the Night bonus.

Spencer faced Helena Kolesnyk on July 21, 2018, at Invicta FC 30: Frey vs. Grusander. She won the fight via a rear-naked choke. The submission earned her the Performance of the Night bonus.

Spencer faced Pam Sorenson on November 16, 2018, at Invicta FC 32: Spencer vs. Sorenson for the vacant Invicta Featherweight title. She won the fight via a rear-naked choke in round four.

=== Ultimate Fighting Championship ===
Spencer signed with the UFC in March 2019 after compiling an undefeated record of 6–0 competing in Invicta FC.

Spencer made her promotional debut on May 18, 2019, at UFC Fight Night: dos Anjos vs. Lee against Megan Anderson. Spencer won the fight in the first round by rear naked choke.

Spencer faced Cris Cyborg in the co-main event on July 27, 2019, at UFC 240. She lost the fight via unanimous decision.

Spencer faced Zarah Fairn on February 29, 2020, at UFC Fight Night 169. She would go on to win the fight via TKO in the first round.

Spencer was expected to face current champion Amanda Nunes on May 9, 2020, at UFC 250. However, on April 9, Dana White, the president of UFC announced that this event was postponed and the bout eventually took place on June 6, 2020, at UFC 250. She lost the bout via unanimous decision.

Spencer was scheduled to face Danyelle Wolf on May 22, 2021, at UFC Fight Night 188. However, Wolf pulled out of the fight in early May due to an undisclosed injury and was replaced by Norma Dumont. Spencer lost the bout via split decision.

Spencer faced Leah Letson on November 13, 2021, at UFC Fight Night 197. She won the fight via technical knockout in round three.

On December 2, 2021, Spencer announced her retirement from professional MMA competition.

== Personal life ==
Spencer graduated at Lemon Bay High School before going on to earn a degree from University of Central Florida. She works as a sixth grade algebra teacher at Florida Virtual School.

== Championships and accomplishments ==
- Ultimate Fighting Championship
  - Tied (Megan Anderson & Norma Dumont) for most bouts in UFC Women's Featherweight division history (6)
  - Tied (Megan Anderson) for most finishes in UFC Women's Featherweight division history (3)
  - Tied (Cris Cyborg and Megan Anderson) for most knockouts in UFC Women's Featherweight division history (2)
  - Tied for most submission wins in UFC Women's Featherweight division history (1)
  - Second most total fight time in UFC Women's Featherweight division history (1:16:26)
- Invicta Fighting Championships
  - Invicta FC Featherweight Championship (one time; former)
  - Performance of the Night (two times) vs. Amy Coleman and Helena Kolesnyk
  - Fight of the Night (one time) vs. Akeela Al-Hameed

== Mixed martial arts record ==
Professional record breakdown
12 matches	9 wins	3 losses
By knockout	3	0
By submission	4	0
By decision	2	3

Res.	Record	Opponent	Method	Event	Date	Round	Time	Location	Notes
Win	9–3	Leah Letson	TKO (punches)	UFC Fight Night: Holloway vs. Rodríguez	November 13, 2021	3	4:25	Las Vegas, Nevada, United States	
Loss	8–3	Norma Dumont	Decision (split)	UFC Fight Night: Font vs. Garbrandt	May 22, 2021	3	5:00	Las Vegas, Nevada, United States	
Loss	8–2	Amanda Nunes	Decision (unanimous)	UFC 250	June 6, 2020	5	5:00	Las Vegas, Nevada, United States	For the UFC Women's Featherweight Championship.
Win	8–1	Zarah Fairn	TKO (punches and elbows)	UFC Fight Night: Benavidez vs. Figueiredo	February 29, 2020	1	3:37	Norfolk, Virginia, United States	
Loss	7–1	Cris Cyborg	Decision (unanimous)	UFC 240	July 27, 2019	3	5:00	Edmonton, Alberta, Canada	
Win	7–0	Megan Anderson	Submission (rear-naked choke)	UFC Fight Night: dos Anjos vs. Lee	May 18, 2019	1	3:24	Rochester, New York, United States	
Win	6–0	Pam Sorenson	Submission (rear-naked choke)	Invicta FC 32: Spencer vs. Sorenson	November 16, 2018	4	4:23	Shawnee, Oklahoma, United States	Won the vacant Invicta FC Featherweight Championship.
Win	5–0	Helena Kolesnyk	Submission (rear-naked choke)	Invicta FC 30: Frey vs. Grusander	July 21, 2018	2	1:47	Kansas City, Missouri, United States	Performance of the Night.
Win	4–0	Akeela Al-Hameed	Decision (unanimous)	Invicta FC 27: Kaufman vs. Kianzad	January 13, 2018	3	5:00	Kansas City, Missouri, United States	Fight of the Night.
Win	3–0	Amy Coleman	Submission (rear-naked choke)	Invicta FC 24: Dudieva vs. Borella	July 15, 2017	1	3:17	Kansas City, Missouri, United States	Performance of the Night.
Win	2–0	Madison McElhaney	Decision (unanimous)	Invicta FC 22: Evinger vs. Kunitskaya II	March 25, 2017	3	5:00	Kansas City, Missouri, United States	Featherweight debut.
Win	1–0	Rachel Wiley	TKO (elbows and punches)	Invicta FC 14: Evinger vs. Kianzad	September 12, 2015	1	3:32	Kansas City, Missouri, United States	Lightweight debut.

== Pay-per-view bouts ==
No.	Event	Fight	Date	Venue	City	PPV buys
1.	UFC 250	Nunes vs. Spencer	June 6, 2020	UFC Apex	Enterprise, Nevada, United States	85,000

== See also ==
- List of female mixed martial artists
- List of Canadian UFC fighters

Awards and achievements
Preceded by Megan Anderson	3rd Invicta FC Featherweight Champion; November 16, 2018 – March 26, 2019	Succeeded by Pam Sorenson
