= Macy Chiasson =

American mixed martial artist

- Born: July 27, 1991 (age 35); New Orleans, Louisiana, U.S.
- Height: 5 ft 11 in (180 cm)
- Weight: 140 lb (64 kg; 10 st 0 lb)
- Division: Bantamweight; Featherweight
- Reach: 72 in (183 cm)
- Fighting out of: Dallas, Texas, U.S.
- Team: Triumph Krav Maga; Fortis MMA; MidCity MMA
- Rank: Brown belt in Brazilian Jiu-Jitsu; Brown belt in Krav Maga
- Years active: 2017–present

Mixed martial arts record
- Total: 17
- Wins: 10
- By knockout: 3
- By submission: 3
- By decision: 4
- Losses: 7
- By knockout: 1
- By submission: 2
- By decision: 4

Other information
- Mixed martial arts record from Sherdog

Macy Chiasson (born July 27, 1991) is an American mixed martial artist. She was the Women's Featherweight winner of The Ultimate Fighter 28 and currently competes in the women's Bantamweight division of the Ultimate Fighting Championship (UFC). As of November 14, 2026, she is #15 in the Meta UFC women's bantamweight rankings.

== Background ==
Chiasson started mixed martial arts at the age of 19, after being bed-ridden for three and one-half weeks recovering from a car accident to get back the fitness level she once was when she was a softball player in high school. After attending some Krav Maga classes at the martial arts gym, she was attracted to the physical aggressiveness and the tough mental side of the combat sport and started teaching Krav Maga after one year of training. Chiasson transitioned to mixed martial arts, training under Mushin MMA and Mid City MMA, as Krav Maga is not a competition combat sport. She began competing in amateur MMA fights during college, amassing a record of 5-2. Chiasson graduated college with a degree in Biology, and began seriously considering competing professionally during her senior year.

== Mixed martial arts career ==
=== Early career ===
Chiasson began her professional MMA career in 2017 and amassed a record of 2–0, fighting under Invicta Fighting Championships (Invicta) and Caged Warrior Championship. In 2018 Chiasson competed for a UFC contract on The Ultimate Fighter 28 UFC TV mma competition series.

=== The Ultimate Fighter ===
In August 2017, it was announced that Chiasson was one of the fighters featured on The Ultimate Fighter 28 UFC TV series.

Chiasson was the second pick of the featherweight fighters by coach Kelvin Gastelum. In the quarter-finals, she faced Larissa Pacheco. She won the fight via a technical knockout in round one. In the semi-finals, Chiasson faced Leah Letson She once again finished the bout by way of knockout in round one. This win secured Chiasson a spot in the finals against Pannie Kianzad.

=== Ultimate Fighting Championship ===
Chiasson made her promotional debut on November 2, 2018, on The Ultimate Fighter 28 Finale. against Pannie Kianzad. She won the fight via a rear-naked choke submission in round two and winning the Ultimate Fighter women's featherweight tournament.

She made her Bantamweight debut on March 2, 2019, at UFC 235 against Gina Mazany. She won the fight via TKO in the first round.

On February 10, 2019, Chiasson replaced an injured Leah Letson and faced Sarah Moras on May 4, 2019, at UFC Fight Night 151. Chiasson won the fight via technical knockout in the second round. This win earned her the Performance of the Night award.

Chiasson faced Lina Länsberg on September 28, 2019, at UFC on ESPN+ 18. She lost the fight via unanimous decision.

Chiasson was scheduled to face Nicco Montaño on February 15, 2020, at UFC Fight Night 167 However, Montaño was forced to pull from the event due to injury and she was replaced by Shanna Young. Chiasson won the fight by unanimous decision.

Chiasson was scheduled to face Sijara Eubanks on September 5, 2020, at UFC Fight Night 176. However, Chiasson pulled out of the fight for undisclosed medical reasons and was replaced by Karol Rosa.

The bout between Chiasson and Marion Reneau was originally scheduled for UFC Fight Night 184. However, during the week leading up to the fight, Reneau was pulled from the card after testing positive for COVID-19. The bout was rescheduled for UFC Fight Night 186. However, yet again, the bout was cancelled due to Reneau tested positive for COVID-19 and the bout eventually took place on March 20, 2021, at UFC on ESPN 21. Chiasson won the fight via unanimous decision.

Chiasson was scheduled to face Aspen Ladd on July 24, 2021, at UFC on ESPN 27. However, the bout was scrapped due to Chiasson suffering an injury. The bout was rescheduled to UFC Fight Night 193 on October 2, 2021. At the weigh-ins, Ladd weighed in at 137 pounds, one pound over the bantamweight non-title limit; due to health concerns resulting from Ladd's weight cut, the bout was cancelled.

Chiasson replaced Julia Avila to face Raquel Pennington on December 18, 2021, at UFC Fight Night 199. At the weigh-ins, Chiasson weighed in at 148.5 pounds, 3.5 pounds over the women's featherweight non-title fight limit. The bout proceeded at a catchweight with Chiasson fined a percentage of her purse, which went to Pennington. She lost the fight via guillotine submission in the second round.

Chiasson faced Norma Dumont on May 7, 2022, at UFC 274. At the weigh-ins, Dumont weighed in at 146.5 pounds, half a pound over the women's featherweight non-title fight limit. The bout proceeded at catchweight, with Dumont forfeiting 30% of her purse to Chiasson. Chiasson won the fight via split decision.

Returning to bantamweight, Chiasson faced Irene Aldana on September 10, 2022, at UFC 279. She lost the fight via knockout via an upkick to the body in the third round.

Chiasson was scheduled to face Ketlen Vieira on January 13, 2024, at UFC Fight Night 234. However, Vieira was pulled due to an injury and the bout was scrapped.

Chiasson faced Pannie Kianzad in a rematch on March 16, 2024, at UFC Fight Night 239. She won by a rear-naked choke submission in the first round. This fight earned her another Performance of the Night award.

Chiasson faced Mayra Bueno Silva on June 29, 2024, at UFC 303. She won the fight by technical knockout via doctor stoppage after landing an elbow which opened a cut above Silva's eye. This fight earned her another Performance of the Night award.

Chiasson was re-scheduled to face Ketlen Vieira on February 22, 2025 at UFC Fight Night 252. However, due to an injury suffered by Chiasson, the bout was removed from the card. The bout between Viera and Chiasson was re-booked for May 31, 2025 at UFC on ESPN 68. The bout was originally scheduled to be a women's bantamweight bout but on the day of the weigh-ins, it was announced that the bout would be changed to a featherweight bout due to "weight management issues" from Vieira, who in turn forfeited 25% of her purse. Chiasson lost the fight by unanimous decision.

Chiasson faced Yana Santos on October 4, 2025, at UFC 320. At the weigh-ins, Chiasson weighed in at 137.5 pounds, one and a half pounds over the women's bantamweight non-title fight limit. The bout proceeded at catchweight and Chiasson was fined a percentage of her purse, which went to Santos. Chiasson lost the fight by unanimous decision.

Chiasson faced Ailín Pérez on February 28, 2026, at UFC Fight Night 268. She lost the fight by unanimous decision.

Chiasson faced Beatriz Mesquita on November 14, 2026 at UFC 334. She lost the fight via a rear-naked choke submission in the first round.

== Personal life ==
Chiasson is an open lesbian and is married to flute professor Dr. Hannah (Leffler) Chiasson.

In April 2010, Chiasson and a friend were victims of a random drive-by shooting in Houma, which left Chiasson shot in the stomach and her friend shot in the leg. While neither injury was particularly life-threatening, the incident left Chiasson bedridden as she recovered. She has credited the experience as a major reason she initially joined a self-defense gym.

In June 2019, Chiasson's Dallas home was severely damaged when a crane fell on her apartment complex, blown over by heavy storm winds. Chiasson was forced to quickly evacuate, with only enough time to escape with her pet dog. The accident left the complex partially destroyed and killed one woman while injuring multiple others. Shortly after, Chiasson sued the relevant crane company and apartment owner for gross negligence.

== Championships and accomplishments ==
=== Mixed martial arts ===
- Ultimate Fighting Championship
  - Performance of the Night (Three times) vs. Sarah Moras, Pannie Kianzad and Mayra Bueno Silva
  - The Ultimate Fighter: Heavy Hitters Women's Featherweight winner.
- MMA Fighting
  - 2024 First Team MMA All-Star

== Mixed martial arts record ==
Professional record breakdown
17 matches	10 wins	7 losses
By knockout	3	1
By submission	3	2
By decision	4	4

Res.	Record	Opponent	Method	Event	Date	Round	Time	Location	Notes
Loss	10–7	Beatriz Mesquita	Submission (rear-naked choke)	UFC 334	November 14, 2026	1	3:23	New York City, New York, United States	
Loss	10–6	Ailín Pérez	Decision (unanimous)	UFC Fight Night: Moreno vs. Kavanagh	February 28, 2026	3	5:00	Mexico City, Mexico	
Loss	10–5	Yana Santos	Decision (unanimous)	UFC 320	October 4, 2025	3	5:00	Las Vegas, Nevada, United States	Catchweight (137.5 lb) bout; Chiasson missed weight.
Loss	10–4	Ketlen Vieira	Decision (unanimous)	UFC on ESPN: Gamrot vs. Klein	May 31, 2025	3	5:00	Las Vegas, Nevada, United States	Featherweight bout.
Win	10–3	Mayra Bueno Silva	TKO (doctor stoppage)	UFC 303	June 29, 2024	2	1:58	Las Vegas, Nevada, United States	Performance of the Night.
Win	9–3	Pannie Kianzad	Submission (rear-naked choke)	UFC Fight Night: Tuivasa vs. Tybura	March 16, 2024	1	3:54	Las Vegas, Nevada, United States	Return to Bantamweight. Performance of the Night.
Loss	8–3	Irene Aldana	KO (upkick to the body)	UFC 279	September 10, 2022	3	2:21	Las Vegas, Nevada, United States	Catchweight (140 lb) bout.
Win	8–2	Norma Dumont	Decision (split)	UFC 274	May 7, 2022	3	5:00	Phoenix, Arizona, United States	Catchweight (146.5 lb) bout; Dumont missed weight.
Loss	7–2	Raquel Pennington	Submission (guillotine choke)	UFC Fight Night: Lewis vs. Daukaus	December 18, 2021	2	3:07	Las Vegas, Nevada, United States	Return to Featherweight; Chiasson missed weight (148.5 lb).
Win	7–1	Marion Reneau	Decision (unanimous)	UFC on ESPN: Brunson vs. Holland	March 20, 2021	3	5:00	Las Vegas, Nevada, United States	
Win	6–1	Shanna Young	Decision (unanimous)	UFC Fight Night: Anderson vs. Błachowicz 2	February 15, 2020	3	5:00	Rio Rancho, New Mexico, United States	
Loss	5–1	Lina Länsberg	Decision (unanimous)	UFC Fight Night: Hermansson vs. Cannonier	September 28, 2019	3	5:00	Copenhagen, Denmark	
Win	5–0	Sarah Moras	TKO (punches)	UFC Fight Night: Iaquinta vs. Cowboy	May 4, 2019	2	2:22	Ottawa, Ontario, Canada	Performance of the Night.
Win	4–0	Gina Mazany	TKO (punches)	UFC 235	March 2, 2019	1	1:49	Las Vegas, Nevada, United States	Bantamweight debut.
Win	3–0	Pannie Kianzad	Submission (rear-naked choke)	The Ultimate Fighter: Heavy Hitters Finale	November 30, 2018	2	2:11	Las Vegas, Nevada, United States	Won The Ultimate Fighter 28 Women`s Featherweight Tournament.
Win	2–0	Allison Schmidt	Decision (unanimous)	Invicta FC 29	May 4, 2018	3	5:00	Kansas City, Missouri, United States	
Win	1–0	Miranda Dearing	Submission (armbar)	Caged Warrior Championship 16	October 21, 2017	3	1:38	Houma, Louisiana, United States	Featherweight debut.

=== Mixed martial arts exhibition record ===
Exhibition record breakdown		
2 matches	2 wins	0 losses
By knockout	2	0

Res.	Record	Opponent	Method	Event	Date	Round	Time	Location	Notes
Win	2–0	Leah Letson	KO (knees to the body)	The Ultimate Fighter: Heavy Hitters	November 28, 2018 (airdate)	1	3:04	Las Vegas, Nevada, United States	The Ultimate Fighter 28 Women`s Featherweight semi-final round.
Win	1–0	Larissa Pacheco	TKO (punches)	The Ultimate Fighter: Heavy Hitters	October 24, 2018 (airdate)	1	3:48	Las Vegas, Nevada, United States	The Ultimate Fighter 28 Women`s Featherweight quarter-final round.

== See also ==
- List of current UFC fighters
- List of female mixed martial artists
