= The Ultimate Fighter: Heavy Hitters =

UFC mixed martial arts television series and event in 2018

- Genre: Reality, Sports
- Created by: Frank Fertitta III, Lorenzo Fertitta, Dana White
- Starring: Dana White; Robert Whittaker; Kelvin Gastelum
- Country of origin: United States

Production
- Running time: 60 minutes

Original release
- Network: Fox Sports 1
- Release: August 29 – November 30, 2018

The Ultimate Fighter: Heavy Hitters (also known as The Ultimate Fighter 28) is an installment of the Ultimate Fighting Championship (UFC)-produced reality television series The Ultimate Fighter. The season tournament finale took place on November 30, 2018, at Pearl Theatre at Palms Casino Resort on Fox Sports 1.

Tryouts were announced on April 25, 2018. This season featured fighters from the women's featherweight and men's heavyweight divisions. The coaches for this season were announced on July 7, pitting The Ultimate Fighter: The Smashes winner and UFC Middleweight Champion Robert Whittaker against The Ultimate Fighter 17 winner Kelvin Gastelum. A middleweight title fight was scheduled between Whittaker and Gastelum after the show on February 9, 2019, at UFC 234. However, Whittaker pulled out of the event a few hours beforehand after he was forced to undergo emergency dual surgery due to an abdominal hernia of the intestine and a twisted and collapsed bowel. The pairing eventually met 2 years later at UFC on ESPN: Whittaker vs. Gastelum. The cast was announced on July 11, 2018.

== Cast ==
=== Coaches ===
Team Whittaker:

- Robert Whittaker, Head Coach
- Fabricio Itte, Wrestling Coach
- Justin Fitzgerald, Boxing Coach
- Sergio Penha, Jiu Jitsu Coach

Team Gastelum:

- Kelvin Gastelum, Head Coach
- Terrell Hunsinger, Assistant Coach
- Tyler Minton, Assistant Coach

=== Fighters ===
- Team Whittaker
  - Heavyweights: Anderson da Silva, Juan Espino, Michel Batista, and Przemysław Mysiala.
  - Women's Featherweights: Julija Stoliarenko, Leah Letson, Larissa Pacheco, and Katharina Lehner.
- Team Gastelum
  - Heavyweights: Ben Sosoli, Maurice Greene, Josh Parisian, and Justin Frazier.
  - Women's Featherweights: Macy Chiasson, Pannie Kianzad, Bea Malecki, and Marciea Allen.

== Episodes ==
Episode 1: Biggest and Baddest (August 29, 2018)

- The fighters arrived in Las Vegas to begin the training and evaluations prior to the teams being picked.
- Gastelum wins the coin toss and chose to pick the first fight. That means Whittaker would have the first fighter pick and the fighters were picked in the following order:

| Coach | 1st Pick | 2nd Pick | 3rd Pick | 4th Pick | 5th Pick | 6th Pick | 7th Pick | 8th Pick |
|---|---|---|---|---|---|---|---|---|
| Whittaker | Anderson da Silva (HW) | Julija Stoliarenko (WFW) | Juan Francisco Espino Dieppa (HW) | Leah Letson (WFW) | Michel Batista (HW) | Larissa Pacheco (WFW) | Przemysław Mysiala (HW) | Katharina Lehner (WFW) |
| Gastelum | Ben Sosoli (HW) | Macy Chiasson (WFW) | Maurice Greene (HW) | Pannie Kianzad (WFW) | Josh Parisian (HW) | Bea Malecki (WFW) | Justin Frazier (HW) | Marciea Allen (WFW) |

- With control of fight selection for the first matchup, Gastelum chose his No. 3 pick Maurice Greene to take on Team Whittaker's No. 7 pick Przemyslaw Mysiala in a heavyweight matchup.
- Maurice Greene defeated Przemysław Mysiala via KO (punch) in Round 1
- Team Gastelum retained control of fight selection, and with a women's featherweight bout up next, he selected his No. 4 pick Pannie Kianzad to fight Team Whittaker's No. 8 pick Katharina Lehner.

Episode 2: Throw Leather (September 5, 2018)

- Gastelum and his assistant coaches worry about Justin Frazier whose cardio isn't up to par with the other fighters during training. He retreated to the bathroom to throw up after practice.
- Pannie Kianzad breaks her tooth while trying to get her stuck headgear off. She has to go to the dentist but has major anxiety during the visit and leaves. But she faces her fears on her second visit and undergoes surgery to replace the damaged front tooth with a dental false tooth over the root.
- Pannie Kianzad defeated Katharina Lehner via unanimous decision after two rounds.
- Whittaker announced the next men's heavyweight fight: Justin Frazier vs. Anderson da Silva

Episode 3: War Tanks (September 12, 2018)

- After two weeks training with Team Gastelum, Justin Frazier does a 180 and turns himself around. He gets a mental and physical boost; no more fatigue and cramping.
- While at the TUF house, the Team Gastelum fighters have trouble communicating with Team Whittaker fighters since the majority are from different countries. To help matters, Team Whittaker's Juan Francisco Espino Dieppa tries his best as his team's interpreter. But being the lone American on Team Whittaker, Leah Letson feels left out by the language barrier.
- Maurice Greene decides to create some tension between the teams and starts impersonating Michel Batista because he believes Batista is a "snake in the grass", pretending not to understand English to get the upper hand.
- Justin Frazier defeated Anderson da Silva via unanimous decision after two rounds.
- Whittaker announced the women's featherweight fight: Julija Stoliarenko vs. Marciea Allen.

Episode 4: A Win is a Win (September 19, 2018)

- Julija Stoliarenko, the kempo karate champion, discussed the honor of being the first female Lithuanian fighter to represent her country to appear on a UFC.
- Gastelum brought in Brian Beaumont, who was one of Gastelum's first MMA coaches, as a special coach to assist his team. During one of the demo sessions, Beaumont surprised Gastelum and awarded him his black belt in Brazilian jiu-jitsu.
- In order to change the setting from the TUF house, Whittaker takes his team to Lake Spring Mountain to workout and have a paddleboard race.
- Leah Letson continued to struggle with the culture of Team Whittker as she thought the training sessions were not challenging enough for her.
- Julija Stoliarenko defeated Marciea Allen in by submission (arm bar) in Round 1.
- Gastelum selected Josh Parisian and Whittaker picked Michel Batista for the third heavyweight quarterfinal.

Episode 5: Life is a Fight (September 26, 2018)

- Following fight between Juliija Stoliarenko and Marciea Allen, Allen lamented her loss while Stoliarenko celebrated her win with alcohol by the pool and ended up throwing up much of what she had consumed.
- Meanwhile, Michael Batista, who won bronze in wrestling at 2008 Summer Olympics, prepared his training for the bout against Josh Parisian who quit his job as a quality investigator for an IT company after he got selected as a contestant for this event.
- John Walker, an NFL veteran and Gastelum's strength and conditioning coach, was invited to TUF house as a motivation speaker for the fighters.
- Leah Letson, who felt communication disconnect with her non-English speaking teammates and Whittaker's hand off style, mentioned the idea to switch to Gastelum team.
- Michel Batista defeated Josh Parisian via TKO (punches) in Round 2.
- The third women's featherweight quarterfinal was set between Bea Malecki and Leah Letson.

Episode 6: Comfortable with the Uncomfortable (October 3, 2018)

- Leah Letson detailed how she had signed by UFC to fight against Yana Kunitskaya and landed the spot in TUF 28 after Kunitskaya pulled from the bout to meet Cris Cyborg at UFC 222, and expressed her satisfaction with her training with Team Whittaker after attention was given to her training intensity.
- Bea Malecki, a formal Air National Guard and Swedish and European Thai boxing champion, did not wanted to brand as the "pretty girl who can not fight" and planned to keep the fight against Letson on the feet to avoid her shortcoming on the ground game.
- Back at the TUF gym, Gastelum brought Uriah Hall as a special guest coach to assist with the fighters training session.
- Leah Letson defeated Bea Malecki via unanimous decision after two rounds.
- Whittaker picks Juan Francisco Espino Dieppa to meet Team Gastelum's Ben Sosoli in the fourth and final heavyweight quarterfinal.

Episode 7: I never have Fear (October 24, 2018)

- Leah Letson showed a pair of black eyes and swollen face from her hard-fought win over Bea Malechi and back on board with Team Whittaker after received help and guidance from the coaches.
- Back in the TUF house, tension rose after Maurice Greene accused Espino Dieppa being a "fake person". Issues were resolved after Greene admitted he was being emotional and he hashed out the problem with Espino Dieppa with civil communication.
- Juan Francisco Espino Dieppa defeated Ben Sosoli via unanimous decision in two rounds.
- Whittaker announced the next women's featherweight fight: Larissa Pacheco vs. Macy Chiasson.

Episode 8: Be First to be Last (October 31, 2018)

- Macy Chiasson who was preparing with her fight against Larissa Pacheco was growing uneasy with Maurice Greene's constant late night drinking, getting drunk and making noise when the others were sleeping.
- The drama continues with Maurice Greene when Anderson da Silva started talking about how Maurice would be "easy money" if they get to fight, causing Greene to lose his temper. Also, Anderson decides to smack talk to Justin Frazier saying during their fight, Frazier "hit him like a pussy".
- Whittaker believed Pacheco would win the fight as she was more experience and competed in UFC before, while Gastelum paid a high regards on Chiasson's skills even she had only a short MMA professional career.
- Macy Chiasson defeated Larissa Pacheco by TKO (punches) in Round 1.
- Dana White announced the semifinal match-ups:
  - Michel Batista vs. Justin Frazier
  - Juan Francisco Espino Dieppa vs. Maurice Greene
  - Julija Stoliarenko vs. Pannie Kianzad
  - Macy Chiasson vs. Leah Letson

Episode 9: Act Like a Professional (November 7, 2018)

- After the semi-final fight announcements, Maurice Greene has a verbal altercation with Anderson da Silva, continuing their last heated conversation the night before. Gastelum and his coaches sit down with Greene and talk to him about his drinking problem and informed him to behave himself and act professional.
- After the altercation, Coach Whittaker holds a team dinner at the gym just to get tensions down and his team's spirits back up.
- Being too overwhelmed by all the drama, Marciea Allen considers leaving the show and even books a flight home.
- Team Gastelum celebrates Macy Chiasson's birthday at the TUF house giving her a bottle of Don Julio 1942 and her teammates getting her balloons and a cake. Also team Gastelum each gets a TUF 28 tattoo to commemorate their participation in the event. However Marciea Allen choose not to participate, citing personal problems with Greene's behavior and just wanted to go home.
- A team meeting is called in the house. Marciea tells Maurice that his behavior makes her uncomfortable and she might want to leave the show because of him. Maurice apologizes to her and expresses he is disappointed and embarrassed on his own conduct in the house. after seeing all her teammates caring about her well-being, Marciea decides to stay.
- Justin Frazier defeated Michel Batista via technical knockout in Round One.

Episode 10: Made For This (November 14, 2018)

- Still not be able to deal with the pressures of the show, Maurice Greene smokes a cigarette outside the TUF house. He believes smoking would not affect his performance. However, Justin Frazier confronts Greene about his smoking, and he tears up, bringing up his family's history with alcoholism.
- Back at the TUF gym, Gastelum has been disappointed in Greene's actions, but offers his support. Assistant coach Terrell Hunsinger runs Greene through "regrouping drills" by running sprints and other exercises, having Greene spell out this favorite alcoholic beverages for his "childish behavior".
- Dana organizes a trip to have the coaches bring their teams to a local waterpark for a rest day. A competitive Whittaker wins a race on the water slide over Gastelum.
- Pannie Kianzad defeated Julija Stoliarenko via unanimous decision.

Episode 11: Be loose, be Free, be me (November 21, 2018)

- Some members of Whittaker's team expresses their dissatisfaction with the training intensity and starts some sparring during their grappling training session. Whittaker and his assistant coaches are angry and frustrated with the team's behavior and they give the fighters a speech; if they don't like their training, then get out of the way. Do that's exactly what they do by having their own training session during their free time at the gym.
- Back at the TUF house, the fighters watched UFC 227 on PPV. Tensions spark when Marciea fast forwards through promotional clips for UFC 229, which displeases some of the fighters including Juan Espino who wanted to see it. A sober Maurice Greene decides to take control of the situation, resulting in a tense confrontation between the two. And the assistant coaches catching Greene smoking outside, much to their dislike.
- On the annual Coaches Challenge, a 5 kilometer race between Whittaker and Gastelum under 106 degrees heat, at the University of Las Vegas track, was set with the winning coach received $10,000 and each winning team member received $1,500 prize. Whittaker won the race easily, and his team took the cash prize.
- Juan Francisco Espino Dieppa defeated Maurice Greene via submission (rear naked choke) in Round 1.

Episode 12: One Thousand Percent (November 28, 2018)

- Team Gastelum's Macy Chiasson prepares for her upcoming fight with Leah Letson. And Gastelum brings in UFC light heavyweight contender Ilir Latifi as a guest coach to work with Chiasson on grappling techniques, but Chiasson is overwhelmed with learning new moves only two days before her fight and has a mental breakdown.
- After Chiasson goes through an intense weight cut, Gastelum holds a final team dinner and invites a special guest, UFC flyweight champion Henry Cejudo for some inspirational advice.
- Macy Chiasson defeated Leah Letson via KO (knees to the body) in Round 1.

== Tournament bracket ==
=== Heavyweight bracket ===
Quarter-finals
Josh Parisian | 2
Michel Batista | TKO
Justin Frazier | UD
Anderson da Silva | 2
Maurice Greene | KO
Przemysław Mysiala | 1
Ben Sosoli | 2
Juan Espino | UD

Semi-finals
Michel Batista | 1
Justin Frazier | TKO
Maurice Greene | 1
Juan Espino | SUB

Final
Justin Frazier | 1
Juan Espino | SUB

=== Women's Featherweight bracket ===
Quarter-finals
Pannie Kianzad | UD
Katharina Lehner | 2
Marciea Allen | 1
Julija Stoliarenko | SUB
Bea Malecki | 2
Leah Letson | UD
Macy Chiasson | TKO
Larissa Pacheco | 1

Semi-finals
Pannie Kianzad | UD
Julija Stoliarenko | 3
Leah Letson | 1
Macy Chiasson | KO

Final
Pannie Kianzad | 2
Macy Chiasson | SUB

Legend
| | Team Whittaker |
| | Team Gastelum |
| UD | Unanimous Decision |
| MD | Majority Decision |
| SUB | Submission |
| (T)KO | (Technical) Knock Out |

== The Ultimate Fighter 28 Finale ==
The Ultimate Fighter: Heavy Hitters Finale
- The poster for The Ultimate Fighter: Heavy Hitters Finale
- Promotion: Ultimate Fighting Championship
- Date: November 30, 2018
- Venue: Pearl Theatre at Palms Casino Resort
- City: Las Vegas, Nevada, United States
- Attendance: 2,020
- Total gate: $204,600

Event chronology
| UFC Fight Night: Blaydes vs. Ngannou 2 | The Ultimate Fighter: Heavy Hitters Finale | UFC Fight Night: dos Santos vs. Tuivasa |

The Ultimate Fighter: Heavy Hitters Finale (also known as The Ultimate Fighter 28 Finale) was a mixed martial arts event produced by the Ultimate Fighting Championship held on November 30, 2018 at Pearl Theatre at Palms Casino Resort in Las Vegas, Nevada, United States.

=== Background ===
A welterweight bout between former UFC Lightweight Champion Rafael dos Anjos and The Ultimate Fighter: American Top Team vs. Blackzilians welterweight winner Kamaru Usman served as the event headliner.

The heavyweight and women's featherweight finals of The Ultimate Fighter: Heavy Hitters are expected to take place at the event.

Former Strikeforce and WEC Lightweight Champion (as well as former UFC Lightweight Championship challenger) Gilbert Melendez was scheduled to face Arnold Allen at the event. However, Melendez pulled out of the fight on November 5 citing an injury and was replaced by former WSOF Featherweight Champion Ricky Glenn. In turn, Allen pulled out of the fight on November 16 citing a cut he received while training. He was replaced by promotional newcomer Kevin Aguilar.

Ashlee Evans-Smith was expected to face promotional newcomer Antonina Shevchenko at the event. However, Evans-Smith pulled out on November 8 and was replaced by Ji Yeon Kim.

A bantamweight bout between Boston Salmon and Khalid Taha was initially scheduled for this event. However the pairing was removed from the card for undisclosed reasons.

At the weigh-ins, Glenn and Kim both missed the required weight for their respective fights. Glenn weighed in at 148.5 pounds, 2.5 pounds over the featherweight non-title fight limit of 146. Meanwhile, Kim weighed in at 130.5 pounds, 4.5 pounds over the flyweight non-title fight limit of 126. Both of them were fined 20 percent of their purse, which went to their opponents Aguilar and Shevchenko. The bouts proceeded at catchweight.

=== Results ===
Main card (Fox Sports 1)
| Weight class | | | | Method | Round | Time | Notes |
|---|---|---|---|---|---|---|---|
| Welterweight | Kamaru Usman | def. | Rafael dos Anjos | Decision (unanimous) (50–43, 49–45, 48–47) | 5 | 5:00 |
| Heavyweight | Juan Espino | def. | Justin Frazier | Submission (straight armlock) | 1 | 3:36 | (Note: The Ultimate Fighter 28 Heavyweight tournament final.) |
| Women's Featherweight | Macy Chiasson | def. | Pannie Kianzad | Submission (rear-naked choke) | 2 | 2:11 | (Note: The Ultimate Fighter 28 Women's Featherweight tournament final.) |
| Bantamweight | Pedro Munhoz | def. | Bryan Caraway | TKO (body kick and punches) | 1 | 2:39 |
| Middleweight | Edmen Shahbazyan | def. | Darren Stewart | Decision (split) (28–29, 29–28, 29–28) | 3 | 5:00 |
| Catchweight (130.5 lb) | Antonina Shevchenko | def. | Ji Yeon Kim | Decision (unanimous) (30–27, 30–27, 30–27) | 3 | 5:00 |
Preliminary card (Fox Sports 1)
| Catchweight (148.5 lb) | Kevin Aguilar | def. | Ricky Glenn | Decision (unanimous) (30–27, 30–27, 30–27) | 3 | 5:00 |
| Flyweight | Joseph Benavidez | def. | Alex Perez | TKO (punches) | 1 | 4:19 |
| Heavyweight | Maurice Greene | def. | Michel Batista | Submission (triangle choke) | 1 | 2:14 |
| Women's Featherweight | Leah Letson | def. | Julija Stoliarenko | Decision (split) (29–28, 28–29, 29–28) | 3 | 5:00 |
Early Preliminary card (UFC Fight Pass)
| Lightweight | Roosevelt Roberts | def. | Darrell Horcher | Submission (guillotine choke) | 1 | 4:50 |
| Welterweight | Tim Means | def. | Ricky Rainey | TKO (punches) | 1 | 1:18 |
| Bantamweight | Raoni Barcelos | def. | Chris Gutiérrez | Submission (rear-naked choke) | 2 | 4:12 |

=== Bonus awards ===
The following fighters received $50,000 bonuses:

- Fight of the Night: None awarded
- Performances of the Night: Kamaru Usman, Juan Espino Dieppa, Joseph Benavidez and Roosevelt Roberts

=== Reported payout ===
The following is the reported payout to the fighters as reported to the Nevada State Athletic Commission. It does not include sponsor money and also does not include the UFC's traditional "fight night" bonuses. The total disclosed payout for the event was $1,007,000.

- Kamaru Usman: $150,000 (includes $75,000 win bonus) def. Rafael dos Anjos: $110,000
- Juan Espino Dieppa: $30,000 (includes $15,000 win bonus) def. Justin Frazier: $15,000
- Macy Chiasson: $30,000 ($15,000 win bonus) def. Pannie Kianzad: $15,000
- Pedro Munhoz: $90,000 ($45,000 win bonus) def. Bryan Caraway: $21,000
- Edmen Shahbazyan: $20,000 ($10,000 win bonus) def. Darren Stewart: $22,000
- Antonina Shevchenko: $36,000 ($15,000 win bonus) def. Ji Yeon Kim: $14,000*
- Kevin Aguilar: $25,000 ($10,000 win bonus) def. Rick Glenn: $20,000**
- Joseph Benavidez: $146,000 ($73,000 win bonus) def. Alex Perez: $22,000
- Maurice Greene: $20,000 ($10,000 win bonus) def. Michel Batista: $10,000
- Leah Letson: $20,000 ($10,000 win bonus) def. Julija Stoliarenko: $10,000
- Roosevelt Roberts: $20,000 ($10,000 win bonus) def. Darrell Horcher: $15,000
- Tim Means: $98,000 ($49,000 win bonus) def. Ricky Rainey: $14,000
- Raoni Barcelos: $24,000 ($12,000 win bonus) def. Chris Gutiérrez: $10,000

* Ji Yeon Kim was fined $6,000, 30 percent of her purse for failing to make the required weight for her fight with Antonina Shevchenko. That money was issued to Shevchenko, an NSAC official confirmed
** Rick Glenn was fined $5,000, 20 percent of his purse for failing to make the required weight for his fight with Kevin Aguilar. That money was issued to Aguilar, an NSAC official confirmed

== See also ==
- The Ultimate Fighter
- List of UFC events
- 2018 in UFC
- List of current UFC fighters
