= Danyelle Wolf =

American boxer and mixed martial artist (born 1983)

- Born: September 8, 1983 (age 43); Wrightsville, Pennsylvania, U.S.
- Height: 5 ft 11 in (1.80 m)
- Weight: 154 lb (70 kg; 11.0 st)
- Division: Welterweight (Boxing); Featherweight (MMA)
- Reach: 70 in (180 cm)
- Style: Boxing
- Stance: Orthodox
- Team: Alliance MMA; Kings MMA

Mixed martial arts record
- Total: 2
- Wins: 1
- By decision: 1
- Losses: 1
- By decision: 1

Other information
- University: Millersville University of Pennsylvania
- Website: www.danyellewolf.com
- Boxing record from BoxRec
- Mixed martial arts record from Sherdog

Danyelle Wolf (born September 8, 1983) is an American boxer and mixed martial artist. She is a three-time USA Boxing National Champion in the women's welterweight division (152 lbs).

== Background ==
She is from York, Pennsylvania. After graduating from Eastern York High School in 2002, she graduated from Millersville University of Pennsylvania where she was a three-sport athlete in basketball, track (heptathlon), and field hockey.

== Amateur boxing career ==
Wolf started training boxing in 2008 and took her first amateur fights in 2010. In 2011, she first attended Olympic trials but her weight class was not added to Olympic boxing in 2012 Summer Olympics. She then went on to win US National Boxing Championships in three consecutive years (2013–2015). In 2015, Wolf again attended Olympic trials and as her weight class was not added to 2016 Summer Olympics either, she transitioned to mixed martial arts.

As the women's welterweight division was added to 2020 Summer Olympics, Wolf returned to the sport to try out for the Olympics. However, she was eliminated from the Olympic trials and returned to mixed martial arts.

== Mixed martial arts career ==
=== Dana White's Contender Series ===
Danyelle made her MMA debut at Dana White's Contender Series 33 on September 15 against Taneisha Tennant. She won the fight via unanimous decision.

=== Ultimate Fighting Championship ===
Wolf was scheduled to face Felicia Spencer on May 22, 2021 at UFC Fight Night 188. However, Wolf pulled out of the fight in early May due to an undisclosed injury and was replaced by Norma Dumont.

Wolf made her promotional debut against Norma Dumont on September 10, 2022, at UFC 279. She lost the fight by unanimous decision.

On October 8, 2024, after two years of inactivity, it was reported that Wolf was removed from the UFC roster.

== Mixed martial arts record ==
Professional record breakdown
2 matches	1 win	1 loss
By decision	1	1

Res.	Record	Opponent	Method	Event	Date	Round	Time	Location	Notes
Loss	1–1	Norma Dumont	Decision (unanimous)	UFC 279	September 10, 2022	3	5:00	Las Vegas, Nevada, United States	
Win	1–0	Taneisha Tennant	Decision (unanimous)	Dana White's Contender Series 33	September 15, 2020	3	5:00	Las Vegas, Nevada, United States	Featherweight debut.

== See also ==
- List of female mixed martial artists
