= Megan Anderson (fighter) =

Australian mixed martial artist

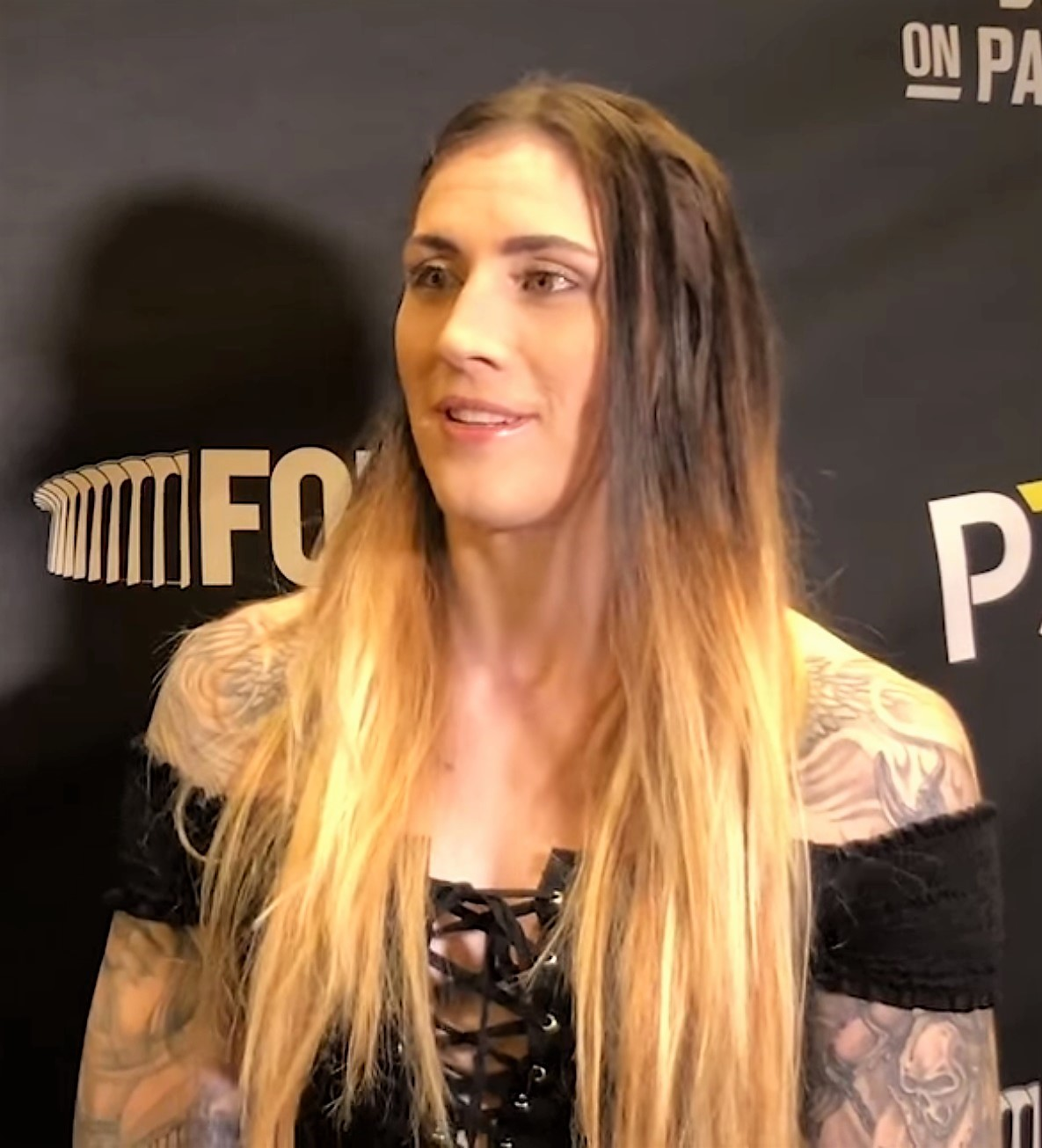
- Anderson interviewed at UFC 232
- Born: 11 February 1990 (age 36); Gold Coast, Queensland, Australia
- Height: 6 ft 0 in (1.83 m)
- Weight: 145 lb (66 kg; 10.4 st)
- Division: Featherweight
- Reach: 72 in (183 cm)
- Fighting out of: Lee's Summit, Missouri, US
- Team: Glory MMA (2015–2021)
- Rank: Purple belt in Brazilian Jiu-Jitsu
- Years active: 2013–2021

Mixed martial arts record
- Total: 16
- Wins: 11
- By knockout: 6
- By submission: 3
- By decision: 2
- Losses: 5
- By submission: 3
- By decision: 2

Other information
- Mixed martial arts record from Sherdog

Megan Anderson (born 11 February 1990) is an Australian former mixed martial artist who competed in the women's Featherweight division of the Ultimate Fighting Championship (UFC) and challenged for the Women's Featherweight's championship in March 2021. Anderson also competed for the all women's MMA league Invicta Fighting Championships, where she won the Invicta FC Featherweight Championship.

== Early life ==
Anderson was born and raised on the Gold Coast, Queensland. She attended All Saints Anglican School throughout her upbringing and moved to Canberra at the beginning of 2008 to join the Australian Army upon graduation from high school. After serving two and a half years in the military, she was discharged when it was discovered she had attempted to take her own life and was subsequently hospitalised. She then returned to the Gold Coast and worked as a receptionist while getting involved in the local boxing scene. Through her boxing connections, she was introduced to mixed martial arts and began training in 2013.

== Mixed martial arts career ==
=== Early career ===
In November 2013, Anderson made her professional MMA debut, losing to Zoie Shreiweis. Over the next two years, Anderson would build her record to four wins and one loss before signing to Invicta Fighting Championships.

=== Invicta FC ===
In her promotional debut in September 2015, Anderson faced Cindy Dandois at Invicta FC 14: Evinger vs. Kianzad. She lost the fight by submission (triangle choke). Anderson then proceeded to gain three wins in the promotion.

==== Invicta FC Featherweight Championship ====
On 14 January 2017, Anderson faced Charmaine Tweet for the Interim Invicta FC Featherweight Championship at Invicta FC 21. She won the fight by TKO in the second round. Anderson was later promoted from Interim to undisputed Featherweight Champion after Cris Cyborg vacated her belt.

After the UFC opted against signing Anderson, Anderson was scheduled to defend her undisputed title against Helena Kolesnyk at Invicta FC 24, on 15 July 2017, but the fight never took place as Anderson was later signed by the UFC.

=== Ultimate Fighting Championship ===
Anderson was scheduled to make her promotional debut against Cris Cyborg at UFC 214 on 29 July 2017. However, Anderson pulled out of the bout on 27 June, citing "personal issues" as the reason. She was replaced by Tonya Evinger.

Anderson faced Holly Holm on 9 June 2018 at UFC 225. She lost the fight via unanimous decision.

Anderson faced Cat Zingano on 29 December 2018 at UFC 232. She won the fight via technical knockout early in the first round after a kick to Zingano caused an eye injury that didn't allow her to continue.

Anderson faced promotional newcomer Felicia Spencer on 18 May 2019 at UFC Fight Night 152. She lost the fight via submission in the first round.

Anderson faced Zarah Fairn on 6 October 2019 at UFC 243. She won the fight via a submission in round one.

Anderson faced Norma Dumont Viana on 29 February 2020 at UFC Fight Night 169. She won the fight via knockout in round one. This win earned her the Performance of the Night award.

Anderson was scheduled to face Amanda Nunes on 12 December 2020 for the UFC Women's Featherweight Championship at UFC 256. However, it was announced on 9 November that Nunes pulled out due to an undisclosed injury and the bout was postponed to 2021. The pairing was rescheduled for 6 March 2021 at UFC 259. She lost the fight via a triangle armbar in round one.

The title fight was the last fight of her prevailing six-fight contract and the organization opted not to renew it, making her a free agent.

In February 2022, Anderson posted in her social media that she is no longer pursuing fights, and is not affiliated with any teams or organizations.

== Championships and accomplishments ==
=== Mixed martial arts ===
- Ultimate Fighting Championship
  - Performance of the Night (One time) vs. Norma Dumont
  - Tied (Felicia Spencer & Norma Dumont) for most bouts in UFC Women's Featherweight division history (6)
  - Tied (Felicia Spencer) for most finishes in UFC Women's Featherweight division history (3)
  - Tied (Cris Cyborg and Felicia Spencer) for most knockouts in UFC Women's Featherweight division history (2)
- Invicta Fighting Championships
  - Invicta FC Featherweight World Championship (one time; former)
  - Interim Invicta FC Featherweight World Championship (one time; former)
  - Performance of the Night (three times) vs. Amanda Bell, Peggy Morgan and Charmaine Tweet
  - Fight of the Night (one time) vs. Amber Leibrock

== Reality show ==
Television
Year	Title	Role	Notes	Ref
2018	Heroes & Superstars	Team Green	Heroes of Warland"	

== Mixed martial arts record ==
Professional record breakdown
16 matches	11 wins	5 losses
By knockout	6	0
By submission	3	3
By decision	2	2

Res.	Record	Opponent	Method	Event	Date	Round	Time	Location	Notes
Loss	11–5	Amanda Nunes	Submission (reverse triangle armbar)	UFC 259	6 March 2021	1	2:03	Las Vegas, Nevada, United States	For the UFC Women's Featherweight Championship.
Win	11–4	Norma Dumont	KO (punch)	UFC Fight Night: Benavidez vs. Figueiredo	29 February 2020	1	3:31	Norfolk, Virginia, United States	Performance of the Night.
Win	10–4	Zarah Fairn	Submission (triangle choke)	UFC 243	6 October 2019	1	3:57	Melbourne, Victoria, Australia	
Loss	9–4	Felicia Spencer	Submission (rear-naked choke)	UFC Fight Night: dos Anjos vs. Lee	18 May 2019	1	3:24	Rochester, New York, United States	
Win	9–3	Cat Zingano	TKO (eye injury)	UFC 232	29 December 2018	1	1:01	Inglewood, California, United States	
Loss	8–3	Holly Holm	Decision (unanimous)	UFC 225	9 June 2018	3	5:00	Chicago, Illinois, United States	
Win	8–2	Charmaine Tweet	TKO (punches and head kick)	Invicta FC 21: Anderson vs. Tweet	14 January 2017	2	2:05	Kansas City, Missouri, United States	Won the interim Invicta FC Featherweight Championship. Later promoted to undisputed champion. Performance of the Night.
Win	7–2	Peggy Morgan	TKO (punches)	Invicta FC 18: Grasso vs. Esquibel	29 July 2016	1	4:09	Kansas City, Missouri, United States	Performance of the Night.
Win	6–2	Amanda Bell	TKO (head kick and punches)	Invicta FC 17: Evinger vs. Schneider	7 May 2016	1	5:00	Costa Mesa, California, United States	Performance of the Night.
Win	5–2	Amber Leibrock	TKO (knees and punches)	Invicta FC 15: Cyborg vs. Ibragimova	16 January 2016	3	2:33	Costa Mesa, California, United States	Fight of the Night.
Loss	4–2	Cindy Dandois	Submission (triangle choke)	Invicta FC 14: Evinger vs. Kianzad	12 September 2015	2	2:41	Kansas City, Missouri, United States	
Win	4–1	Zoie Shreiweis	Submission (armbar)	Roshambo MMA 4	6 December 2014	1	1:32	Brisbane, Queensland, Australia	Won the vacant Roshambo MMA Featherweight Championship.
Win	3–1	Jodie Struzik	Submission (rear-naked choke)	Nitro MMA 12	11 October 2014	2	0:30	Logan City, Queensland, Australia	
Win	2–1	Kerry Barrett	Decision (majority)	Roshambo MMA 3	26 July 2014	3	3:00	Brisbane, Queensland, Australia	
Win	1–1	Janay Harding	Decision (unanimous)	FightWorld Cup 17	12 April 2014	3	3:00	Gold Coast, Queensland, Australia	
Loss	0–1	Zoie Shreiweis	Decision (majority)	FightWorld Cup 16	16 November 2013	3	3:00	Gold Coast, Queensland, Australia	

Awards and achievements
Preceded by Cristiane Justino	2nd Invicta FC Featherweight Champion; March 24, 2017 – June 20, 2017	Succeeded by Felicia Spencer
